= List of Finnish football transfers winter 2024–25 =

This is a list of Finnish football transfers for the 2024–25 winter transfer window. Transfers featuring top-tier Veikkausliiga and second-tier Ykkösliiga are listed.

== Veikkausliiga ==
Note: Flags indicate national team as has been defined under FIFA eligibility rules. Players may hold more than one non-FIFA nationality.

=== IF Gnistan ===
In:

No.	Pos.	Nation	Player
—	MF	GHA	Edmund Arko-Mensah (from (Georgia (country)) Dinamo Batumi)
—	FW	FIN	Artur Atarah (from (Finland) SJK Akatemia)
—	MF	RUS	Yevgeni Bashkirov (from (Finland) VPS)
—	DF	BRA	Marcelo Costa (from (Finland) Atlantis)
—	GK	BEL	Álex Craninx (free agent)
—	DF	FIN	Benjamin Dahlström (from (Finland) MP)
—	DF	BFA	Rachide Gnanou (from (Burkina Faso) Majestic)
—	MF	FIN	Oliver Günes (from (Turkey) Karabük İdman Yurdu)
—	FW	NOR	Didrik Hafstad (from (Norway) Tromsdalen)
—	MF	FIN	Elmeri Lappalainen (from (Finland) PK Keski-Uusimaa)
—	GK	FIN	Oskar Lyberopoulos (from (Finland) EPS)
—	DF	ENG	Oludare Olufunwa (from (Scotland) St Johnstone)
—	GK	FIN	Joel Tynkkynen (from (Finland) HJK Klubi 04)
—	MF	FIN	Elmer Vauhkonen (from (Finland) HJK Klubi 04)

Out:

No.	Pos.	Nation	Player
—	MF	GHA	David Agbo (to (Finland) Ekenäs IF)
—	MF	POR	Tomás Castro (to (Portugal) Caldas)
—	FW	NOR	Jonas Enkerud (to (Faroe Islands) HB Tórshavn)
—	GK	FIN	Kasper Hietanen (to (Finland) FC Honka)
—	DF	FIN	Linus Kahisalo (free agent)
—	MF	FIN	Pauli Katajamäki (free agent)
—	GK	FIN	Jiri Koski (to (Finland) KTP)
—	MF	FIN	Jere Kujanpää (free agent)
—	MF	FIN	Kasperi Liikonen (to (Finland) FC Honka)
—	DF	FIN	Jean-Claude Mabinda (to (Finland) JäPS, previously on loan at JäPS)
—	DF	FIN	Robbie Malolo (free agent)
—	GK	USA	AJ Marcucci (loan return to (United States) New York Red Bulls)
—	DF	FIN	Teemu Penninkangas (to (Finland) Gilla FC)
—	MF	FIN	Roope Pyyskänen (to (Finland) FC Honka)
—	DF	FIN	Toni Takamäki (free agent)
—	FW	BIH	Benjamin Tatar (to (Bosnia and Herzegovina) Sloga Meridian)
—	FW	FIN	Kristian Yli-Hietanen (free agent)
—	DF	FIN	Elias Äijälä (to (Finland) FC Honka)
—	DF	FIN	Henrik Ölander (to (Finland) JäPS)

=== FC Haka ===
In:

No.	Pos.	Nation	Player
—	FW	ENG	James Akintunde (from (Republic of Ireland) Bohemians F.C.)
—	DF	FIN	Mikael Almén (from (Finland) Inter Turku)
—	FW	FIN	Danila Bulgakov (loan from (Finland) Ilves)
—	FW	BRA	Lucas Cini (from (Croatia) HNK Šibenik)
—	FW	FRA	Jean-Pierre Da Sylva (from (Bulgaria) PFC Septemvri Sofia)
—	DF	SCO	Jordan Houston (from (Scotland) Clyde F.C.)
—	MF	FIN	Simon Lindholm (from (Finland) Ekenäs IF)
—	FW	FIN	Kalle Multanen (from (Finland) VPS)
—	FW	FIN	Eetu Mömmö (loan from (Italy) Lecce)
—	MF	GHA	Abraham Okyere (from (Finland) KPV)
—	FW	BER	Djair Parfitt (from (Northern Ireland) Glentoran)
—	DF	FIN	Valentin Purosalo (from (Finland) Inter Turku)
—	MF	VEN	Elías Romero (from (Venezuela) Deportivo La Guaira)
—	DF	FIN	Riku Selander (from (Finland) FC Lahti)
—	GK	FIN	Kasperi Silen (from (Finland) FC Haka U19)
—	FW	BEN	Steve Traoré (from (Bulgaria) Lokomotiv Sofia)

Out:

No.	Pos.	Nation	Player
—	FW	SRB	Marko Bačanin (to (Malta) Balzan F.C.)
—	DF	TOG	Haymenn Bah-Traoré (to (Lithuania) Kauno Žalgiris)
—	MF	SEN	Maissa Fall (to (Finland) VPS)
—	FW	FIN	Oiva Laaksonen (to (North Macedonia) FK Voska Sport)
—	FW	ENG	Imani Lanquedoc (loan return to (England) Fulham U21)
—	DF	FIN	Ryan Mahuta (to (Czech Republic) FK Pardubice)
—	MF	FIN	Elias Mastokangas (to (Finland) SJK Seinäjoki)
—	MF	POR	Guilherme Morais (to (Kazakhstan) FC Atyrau)
—	MF	FIN	Eemeli Mäkelä (to (Finland) SalPa)
—	DF	CMR	Hassan Ndam (to (Denmark) Vendsyssel FF)
—	DF	FIN	Jesse Nikki (to (Finland) JäPS)
—	FW	FIN	Anthony Olusanya (loan return to (Finland) HJK Helsinki)
—	MF	BEL	Evangelos Patoulidis (to (Norway) Sandefjord)
—	MF	NED	Benjamin Reemst (to (Netherlands) Excelsior Maassluis)
—	MF	FIN	Tuure Siira (to (North Macedonia) FK Voska Sport)
—	MF	FIN	Tuukka Törmä (to (Finland) Tampere United)
—	MF	NZL	Oliver Whyte (to (Qatar) Muaither SC)

=== HJK Helsinki ===
In:

No.	Pos.	Nation	Player
—	MF	FIN	Stanislav Baranov (loan return from (Estonia) Tallinna Kalev)
—	FW	FIN	David Ezeh (loan return from (Poland) Raków Częstochowa)
—	MF	FIN	Jere Kallinen (from (Finland) AC Oulu)
—	MF	FIN	Pyry Mentu (from (Finland) HJK Klubi 04)
—	FW	USA	Benji Michel (from (United States) Real Salt Lake)
—	FW	FIN	Anthony Olusanya (loan return from (Finland) FC Haka)
—	FW	FIN	Teemu Pukki (from (United States) Minnesota United FC)
—	GK	FIN	Alex Ramula (from (Finland) HJK Klubi 04)
—	MF	FIN	Alexander Ring (from (United States) Austin FC)
—	MF	FIN	Matias Ritari (from (Finland) HJK Klubi 04)
—	DF	SEN	Cheikh Sidibé (from (Tanzania) Azam FC)
—	DF	FIN	Kaius Simojoki (from (Finland) HJK Klubi 04)
—	DF	FIN	Aaro Soiniemi (loan return from (Finland) TPS)
—	DF	FIN	Ville Tikkanen (from (Finland) SJK Seinäjoki)
—	MF	FIN	Aaro Toivonen (loan return from (Estonia) Tallinna Kalev)
—	FW	FIN	Ville Vuorinen (from (Finland) HJK Klubi 04)

Out:

No.	Pos.	Nation	Player
—	MF	BEL	Alessandro Albanese (to (Belgium) RFC Liège)
—	FW	SCO	Lee Erwin (to (North Macedonia) KF Gostivari)
—	DF	FIN	Aapo Halme (free agent)
—	DF	FIN	Kevin Kouassivi-Benissan (loan to (Slovakia) FC Košice)
—	MF	FIN	Niilo Kujasalo (to (Finland) IFK Mariehamn)
—	FW	FIN	Kai Meriluoto (loan to (Slovenia) NK Maribor)
—	GK	FIN	Niki Mäenpää (to (Greece) Athens Kallithea)
—	FW	FIN	Anthony Olusanya (to (Sweden) Kalmar FF)
—	DF	FIN	Noah Pallas (to (Norway) Vålerenga)
—	MF	EST	Kevor Palumets (loan return to (Belgium) Zulte Waregem)
—	FW	ENG	Luke Plange (loan return to (England) Crystal Palace)
—	MF	GHA	Hans Nunoo Sarpei (free agent)
—	MF	JPN	Atomu Tanaka (to (Finland) KTP)
—	DF	FIN	Joona Toivio (to (Finland) KTP)
—	DF	FIN	Eemil Toivonen (loan to (Finland) IFK Mariehamn)

=== Ilves ===
In:

No.	Pos.	Nation	Player
—	FW	FIN	Teemu Hytönen (from (Finland) VPS)
—	MF	SWE	Jardell Kanga (loan from (Sweden) Hammarby)
—	GK	BIH	Faris Krkalić (from (Croatia) Dinamo Zagreb)
—	DF	FIN	Ville Kumpu (from (Finland) Ilves II)
—	DF	FIN	Jaakko Moisio (from (Finland) Ilves II)
—	DF	BRA	David Oliveira (from (Finland) KPV)
—	DF	FIN	Matias Rale (from (Lithuania) Kauno Žalgiris)
—	MF	FIN	Otto Tiitinen (from (Finland) Ilves II)
—	DF	FIN	Sauli Väisänen (free agent)
—	GK	FIN	Johannes Viitala (loan return from (Finland) IFK Mariehamn)
—	DF	FIN	Kalle Wallius (from (Norway) IK Start)

Out:

No.	Pos.	Nation	Player
—	DF	NGR	Joshua Akpudje (to (Tajikistan) FC Istiklol)
—	MF	FIN	Doni Arifi (to (Finland) KuPS)
—	MF	GHA	Isaac Atanga (loan return to (Norway) Aalesunds FK)
—	FW	FIN	Danila Bulgakov (loan to (Finland) FC Haka)
—	MF	FIN	Noel Hasa (loan to (Finland) FC Lahti)
—	DF	POR	Jorginho (to (Czech Republic) FK Dukla Prague)
—	MF	FRA	Abdoulaye Kanté (to (Finland) FC Lahti)
—	DF	FIN	Matias Kivikko Arraño (loan to (Finland) IFK Mariehamn)
—	DF	BRA	David Oliveira (loan to (Finland) FC Lahti)
—	DF	FIN	Juhani Pikkarainen (to (Sweden) Degerfors IF)
—	DF	FIN	Jere Riissanen (loan to (Finland) FC Jazz)
—	GK	FIN	Ville Seppä (to (Germany) Bremer SV)
—	MF	NED	Sander Sybrandy (loan return to (Netherlands) Twente U21)
—	MF	FIN	Arttu Tulehmo (loan to (Finland) KTP)
—	GK	FIN	Johannes Viitala (loan to (Finland) IFK Mariehamn)

=== FC Inter Turku ===
In:

No.	Pos.	Nation	Player
—	MF	FIN	Otto Eloluoto (from (Finland) Inter Turku U19)
—	FW	CMR	Antoin Essomba (from (Slovakia) MŠK Žilina)
—	FW	CIV	Alain Guei (loan from (Belgium) S.V. Zulte Waregem)
—	MF	FIN	Momodou Sarr (loan from (Denmark) Kolding IF)
—	DF	FIN	Sami Sipola (from (Finland) FF Jaro)
—	FW	FIN	Jasse Tuominen (from (Poland) Bruk-Bet Termalica Nieciecza)
—	DF	FIN	Väinö Vehkonen (from (Finland) Ekenäs IF)

Out:

No.	Pos.	Nation	Player
—	MF	FIN	Anton Aaltonen (free agent)
—	DF	FIN	Mikael Almén (to (Finland) FC Haka)
—	MF	NED	Kevin Jansen (to (Finland) Inter Turku II)
—	FW	CRO	Viktor Kanižaj (free agent)
—	FW	FIN	Otto Lehtisalo (to (Finland) SalPa)
—	DF	ESP	Derik Osede (free agent)
—	DF	FIN	Valentin Purosalo (to (Finland) FC Haka)
—	FW	FIN	Daniel Rökman (to (Finland) PK Keski-Uusimaa)
—	FW	RSA	Darren Smith (to (United States) Detroit City FC)
—	FW	FIN	Matias Tamminen (to (Sweden) Östers IF)

=== FF Jaro ===
In:

No.	Pos.	Nation	Player
—	MF	NGR	Emmanuel Ekpenyong (from (Nigeria) Doma United F.C.)
—	DF	SWE	Erik Gunnarsson (from (Faroe Islands) 07 Vestur)
—	FW	FIN	Elliott Holmang (from (Finland) FF Jaro U19)
—	FW	SWE	Samouil Izountouemoi (from (Sweden) Gefle IF)
—	GK	NGR	Saheed Jimoh (free agent)
—	DF	FIN	Oliver Kangaslahti (from (Finland) Inter Turku II)
—	DF	FIN	Felix Kass (from (Finland) FF Jaro U19)
—	MF	SWE	Manasse Kusu (loan from (Sweden) Mjällby AIF)
—	DF	GHA	Robin Polley (free agent)
—	GK	POR	Miguel Santos (from (Portugal) Anadia F.C.)
—	FW	GUI	Kerfala Cissoko (from (Sweden) Umeå F.C.)
—	FW	SLO	Filip Valenčič (from (Finland) FC Honka)
—	FW	FIN	Rudi Vikström (from (Finland) FF Jaro U19)

Out:

No.	Pos.	Nation	Player
—	DF	FIN	Roni Björkskog (to (Finland) Jakobstads BK)
—	FW	SWE	Edvin Crona (to (Sweden) IFK Berga)
—	MF	FIN	Antonio Hotta (to (Finland) FF Jaro II)
—	DF	FIN	Sebastian Hulden (to (Finland) GBK Kokkola)
—	MF	FIN	Markus Kronholm (to (Finland) Jakobstads BK)
—	GK	RUS	Sergey Lazarev (free agent)
—	DF	TTO	Kareem Moses (to (Finland) Jakobstads BK)
—	DF	FIN	Benjamin Sandnäs (free agent)
—	FW	FIN	Axel Sandstedt (free agent)
—	DF	FIN	Sami Sipola (to (Finland) Inter Turku)
—	GK	SWE	Pontus Zvar (free agent)

=== KTP ===
In:

No.	Pos.	Nation	Player
—	GK	MLI	Madou Diakité (on loan from (Italy) Triestina Calcio)
—	MF	CMR	Franck Ellé Essouma (from (Bulgaria) PFC Septemvri Sofia)
—	MF	FIN	Petteri Forsell (from (Turkey) Şanlıurfaspor)
—	FW	AUS	Mitchell Glasson (loan from (Australia) Sydney FC)
—	GK	FIN	Jiri Koski (from (Finland) IF Gnistan)
—	FW	NOR	Marius Larsen (from (Norway) Tromsdalen UIL)
—	DF	FIN	Juho Lehtiranta (from (Finland) AC Oulu)
—	MF	GHA	Kwame Otu (from (Finland) SJK Akatemia, previously on loan at KTP)
—	DF	FIN	Luka Puhakainen (from (Finland) LauTP)
—	DF	FIN	Aapo Ruohio (from (Finland) LauTP)
—	FW	SEN	Assan Seck (free agent)
—	MF	JPN	Atomu Tanaka (from (Finland) HJK Helsinki)
—	DF	FIN	Joona Toivio (from (Finland) HJK Helsinki)
—	MF	FIN	Arttu Tulehmo (loan from (Finland) Ilves)

Out:

No.	Pos.	Nation	Player
—	FW	COD	Serge Atakayi (to (Finland) KPV Kokkola)
—	FW	AUS	Alen Harbas (loan return to (Australia) Sydney FC)
—	MF	FIN	Anttoni Huttunen (to (Finland) IFK Mariehamn)
—	FW	FIN	Aapo Hyppönen (to (Finland) SJK Akatemia, previously on loan at MP)
—	GK	GAM	Sam Jammeh (to (Finland) HIFK)
—	DF	FIN	Leo Kyllönen (to (Finland) FC Jazz)
—	MF	FIN	Johannes Laaksonen (retired)
—	MF	FIN	Matias Lindfors (retired)
—	MF	GHA	Kwame Otu (contract terminated)
—	FW	FIN	Santeri Stenius (to (Finland) Ekenäs IF)
—	FW	FIN	Aleksi Tanninen (free agent)
—	MF	GEO	Omar Todua (loan return to (Georgia (country)) Dinamo Tbilisi II)
—	GK	FIN	Kristian Varis (to (Finland) Haminan Pallo-Kissat)
—	DF	FIN	Valtteri Vesiaho (to (Finland) Jippo)

=== KuPS ===
In:

No.	Pos.	Nation	Player
—	MF	GHA	Derrick Atta Agyei (from (Ghana) Dreams)
—	MF	FIN	Doni Arifi (from (Finland) Ilves)
—	DF	GHA	Bob Nii Armah (from (Finland) SJK Seinäjoki)
—	DF	GHA	Eric Danso Boateng (from (Ghana) Dreams)
—	DF	FIN	Niko Hämäläinen (free agent)
—	FW	KOS	Dion Krasniqi (on loan from (Sweden) IF Elfsborg)
—	DF	FIN	Arttu Lötjönen (from (Italy) Sampdoria)
—	MF	FIN	Samuel Pasanen (from (Finland) FC Lahti)
—	GK	FIN	Miilo Pitkänen (from (Finland) KuPS Akatemia)
—	FW	FIN	Agon Sadiku (on loan from (Netherlands) FC Emmen)
—	MF	FIN	Roope Salo (from (Finland) AC Oulu)
—	MF	FIN	Eemil Tanninen (from (Finland) Jippo)
—	DF	FIN	Rasmus Tikkanen (from (Finland) KuPS Akatemia)
—	FW	GUI	Mohamed Toure (from (Finland) TPS)

Out:

No.	Pos.	Nation	Player
—	DF	SWE	Kristopher Da Graca (loan return to (Sweden) IK Sirius)
—	FW	SWE	Ousmane Diawara (loan return to (Austria) SCR Altach)
—	DF	FIN	Taneli Hämäläinen (to (Netherlands) ADO Den Haag)
—	FW	FIN	Jonathan Muzinga (to (Finland) FC Lahti)
—	DF	FIN	Samu Koistinen (to (Finland) Jippo)
—	MF	NGR	Paul Ogunkoya (loan return to (Nigeria) Mahanaim)
—	FW	BRA	Lucas Rangel (free agent)
—	DF	FIN	Seth Saarinen (to (Netherlands) De Graafschap)
—	MF	FIN	Matias Siltanen (to (Sweden) Djurgårdens IF)
—	MF	FIN	Axel Vidjeskog (to (Sweden) Trelleborgs FF)

=== IFK Mariehamn ===
In:

No.	Pos.	Nation	Player
—	FW	NGR	Cody David (from (Scotland) Raith Rovers F.C.)
—	MF	NED	Jelle van der Heyden (from (Faroe Islands) B36 Tórshavn)
—	MF	FIN	Anttoni Huttunen (from (Finland) KTP)
—	MF	FIN	Milton Jansson (from (Finland) IFK Mariehamn U19)
—	DF	FIN	Matias Kivikko Arraño (loan from (Finland) Ilves)
—	MF	FIN	Niilo Kujasalo (from (Finland) HJK Helsinki)
—	DF	SWE	Pontus Lindgren (from (Sweden) GIF Sundsvall)
—	GK	SWE	Kevin Lund (from (Sweden) Viggbyholms IK)
—	DF	BEL	Ardy Mfundu (from (Belgium) Beerschot II)
—	FW	ZIM	Admiral Muskwe (from (England) Harrogate Town A.F.C.)
—	DF	FIN	Eemil Toivonen (loan from (Finland) HJK Helsinki)
—	GK	FIN	Johannes Viitala (loan from (Finland) Ilves, previously on loan at IFK Mariehamn)

Out:

No.	Pos.	Nation	Player
—	DF	FIN	Eero-Matti Auvinen (free agent)
—	FW	BRA	Dé (to (India) Namdhari FC)
—	FW	SWE	Adam Larsson (to (United States) Monterey Bay FC)
—	DF	POR	Pedro Machado (to (Canada) Pacific FC)
—	DF	BEL	Ardy Mfundu (loan to (Finland) KPV Kokkola)
—	GK	FIN	Marc Nordqvist (free agent)
—	MF	FIN	Matias Ojala (to (Finland) AC Oulu)
—	MF	NIG	Mamane Amadou Sabo (loan return to (Sweden) Hammarby)
—	MF	FIN	Robin Sid (to (Finland) Ekenäs IF)
—	MF	GHA	Usman Suleman (to (Finland) FC Jazz)
—	DF	FIN	Kalle Wallius (loan return to (Norway) IK Start)

=== AC Oulu ===
In:

No.	Pos.	Nation	Player
—	DF	GBS	Adramane Cassamá (from (Portugal) Porto B)
—	MF	SLE	Abu Dumbuya (from (Northern Cyprus) Gençlik Gücü)
—	GK	SWE	William Eskelinen (from (Iceland) Vestri)
—	DF	GAM	Musa Jatta (from (Slovakia) Podbrezová, previously on loan at AC Oulu)
—	MF	FIN	Tuomas Kaukua (from (Finland) SJK Seinäjoki)
—	DF	FIN	Otto Kemppainen (from (Finland) SJK Seinäjoki)
—	DF	FIN	Miika Koskela (loan from (Norway) Tromsø IL)
—	DF	FIN	Joel Lehtonen (from (Finland) Ekenäs IF)
—	MF	FIN	Eemil Merikanto (from (Finland) OLS)
—	FW	SWE	Marokhy Ndione (from (Romania) FC U Craiova)
—	MF	FIN	Matias Ojala (from (Finland) IFK Mariehamn)
—	DF	FIN	Mikko Pitkänen (from (Finland) VPS)
—	GK	FIN	Niklas Schulz (from (Italy) Gravina)
—	DF	FIN	Santeri Silander (from (Finland) OLS)
—	MF	FIN	Onni Tiihonen (from (Romania) Unirea Ungheni)

Out:

No.	Pos.	Nation	Player
—	DF	NOR	Liiban Abadid (loan return to (Sweden) IF Brommapojkarna)
—	FW	BRA	Marcos André (loan return to (Brazil) Retrô)
—	DF	SWE	Simon Bengtsson (loan return to (Sweden) Helsingborgs IF)
—	FW	ENG	Ashley Coffey (to (China) Shanghai Jiading Huilong)
—	DF	FIN	Yassin Daoussi (to (Finland) Ekenäs IF)
—	MF	NIR	Jake Dunwoody (free agent)
—	DF	GEQ	José Elo ( (Lithuania) FK Banga Gargždai)
—	DF	FIN	Alexander Forsström (to (Finland) Ekenäs IF)
—	MF	FIN	Daniel Heikkinen (to (Finland) FC Lahti)
—	FW	FIN	Jesse Huhtala (to (Finland) Tampere United)
—	GK	FIN	Nuutti Kaikkonen (to (Finland) Jippo)
—	MF	FIN	Jere Kallinen (to (Finland) HJK Helsinki)
—	DF	FIN	Juho Lehtiranta (to (Finland) KTP)
—	MF	GRE	Dimitrios Metaxas (to (Greece) Volos)
—	DF	FIN	Niklas Orjala (free agent)
—	MF	FIN	Asla Peltola (loan to (Finland) FC Lahti)
—	DF	POL	Jowin Radziński (to (Poland) Warta Gorzów Wielkopolski)
—	MF	FIN	Roope Salo (to (Finland) KuPS)
—	FW	FIN	Onni Suutari (free agent)
—	GK	ENG	Calum Ward (to (Scotland) Motherwell)

=== SJK Seinäjoki ===
In:

No.	Pos.	Nation	Player
—	FW	FIN	Artur Atarah (from (Finland) SJK Akatemia)
—	DF	FRO	Samuel Chukwudi (from (Faroe Islands) HB Tórshavn)
—	DF	FIN	Tuomas Koivisto (from (Finland) SJK Akatemia)
—	MF	FIN	Marius Könkkölä (from (Finland) FC Lahti)
—	DF	FIN	Arvi Liljaniemi (from (Finland) MP)
—	MF	FIN	Aniis Machaal (from (Finland) SJK Akatemia II)
—	FW	FIN	Elias Mastokangas (from (Finland) FC Haka)
—	DF	FIN	Gabriel Oksanen (from (Finland) SJK Akatemia)
—	MF	ZIM	Prosper Padera ( (England) Brooke House College)
—	DF	CPV	Kelvin Pires (from (Slovakia) AS Trenčín, previously on loan at (Finland) SJK Seinäjoki)
—	DF	NGR	Nathaniel Tahmbi (from (Finland) SJK Akatemia)
—	FW	BEN	Olatoundji Tessilimi (from (Finland) SJK Akatemia)
—	FW	HON	Alenis Vargas (from (United States) Sporting Kansas City)

Out:

No.	Pos.	Nation	Player
—	DF	CIV	Ibrahim Cissé (to (Lithuania) FC Džiugas Telšiai, previously on loan at FC Džiugas Telšiai)
—	MF	FIN	Denis Cukici (to (Finland) KäPa)
—	MF	FIN	Pyry Hannola (loan to (Poland) Stal Mielec)
—	MF	FIN	Tuomas Kaukua (to (Finland) AC Oulu)
—	DF	FIN	Otto Kemppainen (to (Finland) AC Oulu)
—	MF	MAS	Nooa Laine (to (Malaysia) Selangor F.C., previously on loan at Selangor F.C.)
—	MF	ARG	Gonzalo Miceli (to (Spain) CD Villarrobledo)
—	FW	NCA	Jaime Moreno (to (Indonesia) Barito Putera)
—	MF	FIN	Eetu Mömmö (loan return to (Italy) US Lecce)
—	DF	FIN	Dario Naamo (to (Austria) SKN St. Pölten, previously on loan at SKN St. Pölten)
—	DF	SCO	Lewis Strapp (to (Scotland) Airdrieonians F.C.)
—	DF	FIN	Ville Tikkanen (to (Finland) HJK Helsinki)

=== VPS ===
In:

No.	Pos.	Nation	Player
—	DF	NED	Tristan Dekker (free agent)
—	GK	FIN	Eino Ehrnrooth (from (Finland) VPS U19)
—	MF	FRA	Yassine El Ouatki (from (Faroe Islands) NSÍ Runavík)
—	MF	NGR	Mmenie-Abasi Etok (from (Finland) FC Jazz)
—	MF	SEN	Maissa Fall (from (Finland) FC Haka)
—	FW	CAN	Nicolas Fleuriau Chateau (loan from (Canada) Vancouver Whitecaps)
—	FW	FIN	Kalle Huhta (from (Finland) VPS U19)
—	FW	FIN	Olli Jakonen (from (Finland) Salon Palloilijat)
—	DF	FIN	Joonas Lakkamäki (from (Finland) TPS)
—	MF	FIN	Luka Nuorela (from (Finland) VPS U19)
—	DF	ENG	Tyler Reid (from (Moldova) FC Sheriff Tiraspol)
—	DF	SWE	Vilmer Rönnberg (from (Faroe Islands) NSÍ Runavík)

Out:

No.	Pos.	Nation	Player
—	MF	FIN	Samu Alanko (to (Norway) FK Jerv)
—	MF	RUS	Yevgeni Bashkirov (to (Finland) IF Gnistan)
—	MF	NGR	Peter Eletu (free agent)
—	DF	FIN	Felix Friberg (loan to (Finland) KPV Kokkola)
—	DF	FIN	Teemu Hytönen (to (Finland) VPS)
—	DF	FIN	Juho Hyvärinen (to (Finland) Rollon Pojat)
—	FW	FIN	Riku Jääskä (free agent)
—	FW	NGR	Franklin Matib (free agent)
—	FW	FIN	Kalle Multanen (to (Finland) FC Haka)
—	FW	NGR	Emmanuel Ogude ( (Denmark) Nykøbing)
—	DF	FIN	Mikko Pitkänen (to (Finland) AC Oulu)
—	GK	FIN	Lauri Vetri (loan to (Finland) SalPa)

== Ykkösliiga ==
=== Ekenäs IF ===
In:

No.	Pos.	Nation	Player
—	MF	GHA	David Agbo (from (Finland) IF Gnistan)
—	FW	GUI	Saïdou Bah (from (Finland) SJK Akatemia)
—	DF	FIN	Yassin Daoussi (from (Finland) AC Oulu)
—	DF	FIN	Alexander Forsström (from (Finland) AC Oulu)
—	DF	FIN	William Grönblom (from (Finland) HJK Klubi 04)
—	MF	FIN	Jesper Karlsson (from (Finland) TPS)
—	DF	FRA	Thadée Kaleba (from (Bulgaria) FC Sportist Svoge)
—	GK	FIN	Otso Linnas (from (Finland) Jippo)
—	FW	FIN	Salomo Ojala (from (Malta) Mosta FC)
—	DF	FIN	Roope Pakkanen (from (Finland) TPS)
—	GK	FIN	Onni Rintamäki (loan return from (Finland) Esbo Bollklubb)
—	MF	FIN	Robin Sid (from (Finland) IFK Mariehamn)
—	FW	FIN	Santeri Stenius (from (Finland) KTP)
—	MF	AUS	Daniel Stynes (from (Republic of Ireland) Galway United F.C.)

Out:

No.	Pos.	Nation	Player
—	FW	FIN	Samuel Anini Junior (to (Finland) Käpylän Pallo)
—	DF	GHA	Kingsley Gyamfi (loan return to (Sweden) Hammarby)
—	FW	CIV	Tiemoko Fofana (free agent)
—	FW	SWE	Elton Hedström (loan return to (Sweden) Hammarby Talang FF)
—	DF	SWE	Benjamin Hjertstrand (to (Sweden) Falu BS)
—	DF	FIN	Kalle Katz (free agent)
—	GK	FIN	Jere Koponen (to (Finland) Peimari United)
—	DF	FIN	Joel Lehtonen (to (Finland) AC Oulu)
—	MF	FIN	Simon Lindholm (to (Finland) FC Haka)
—	FW	FIN	Noah Lundström (free agent)
—	DF	SOM	Fahad Mohamed (to (Finland) Salon Palloilijat)
—	FW	FIN	Salomo Ojala (to (Malta) Mosta FC)
—	MF	FIN	Emil Pallas (to (Finland) PK-35)
—	MF	FIN	Eetu Puro (free agent)
—	DF	FIN	Väinö Vehkonen (to (Finland) FC Inter Turku)

=== Jippo ===
In:

No.	Pos.	Nation	Player
—	GK	FIN	Nuutti Kaikkonen (from (Finland) AC Oulu)
—	MF	FIN	Eeli Kinnunen (from (Finland) Jippo II)
—	DF	FIN	Samu Koistinen (from (Finland) KuPS)
—	DF	ESP	Karlos Mahugo (free agent)
—	MF	FIN	Benjamin Montonen (from (Finland) FC Vaajakoski)
—	FW	FIN	Janne Partanen (loan return from (Finland) FC Espoo)
—	FW	FIN	Veeti Piiparinen (from (Finland) Niemisen Urheilijat)
—	MF	FIN	Maximus Tainio (from (Finland) Salon Palloilijat)
—	FW	FIN	Miro Turunen (from (Finland) SJK Akatemia, previously on loan at Käpylän Pallo)
—	DF	FIN	Valtteri Vesiaho (from (Finland) KTP)

Out:

No.	Pos.	Nation	Player
—	DF	FIN	Erol Erguner (to (Finland) PEPO Lappeenranta)
—	GK	FIN	Otso Linnas (to (Finland) Ekenäs IF)
—	DF	FIN	Niko Niemeläinen (to (Finland) JPS, previously on loan at Niemisen Urheilijat)
—	DF	JPN	Yusei Ohashi (to (Japan) Arterivo Wakayama)
—	DF	BRA	Victor de Paula (to Penya Encarnada d'Andorra)
—	FW	FIN	Terrence Smith (free agent)
—	MF	FIN	Eemil Tanninen (to (Finland) KuPS)
—	FW	FIN	Aake Yletyinen (free agent)

=== JäPS ===
In:

No.	Pos.	Nation	Player
—	MF	AFG	Mosawer Ahadi (from (Afghanistan) Abu Muslim FC)
—	FW	FIN	Hugo Hahl (from (Finland) PK Keski-Uusimaa)
—	MF	FIN	Reza Heidari (from (Finland) PK-35)
—	FW	FIN	Daniel Hvidberg (from (Finland) JäPS II)
—	MF	FIN	Keaton Isaksson (free agent)
—	DF	FIN	Jean-Claude Mabinda (from (Finland) IF Gnistan)
—	GK	FIN	Besart Mustafa (from (Finland) Atlantis)
—	DF	FIN	Jesse Nikki (from (Finland) FC Haka)
—	DF	FIN	Aleksi Sainio (from (Finland) PK Keski-Uusimaa)
—	DF	FIN	Julius Salo (from (Finland) Atlantis)
—	DF	FIN	Jaakko Sivunen (from (Finland) JäPS II)
—	FW	FIN	Impton Söderlund (from (Finland) Atlantis II)
—	DF	FIN	Jermu Virtanen (from (Finland) PK Keski-Uusimaa)
—	DF	FIN	Henrik Ölander (from (Finland) IF Gnistan)

Out:

No.	Pos.	Nation	Player
—	MF	FIN	Altti Hellemaa (to (Sweden) Trelleborgs FF)
—	MF	FIN	Noah Kaijasilta (to (Finland) Salon Palloilijat)
—	FW	FIN	Sebastian Kamara (free agent)
—	MF	FIN	Veka Ketonen (free agent, previously on loan at (Finland) NJS)
—	DF	FIN	Urho Kumpulainen (to (Finland) EPS, previously on loan at EPS)
—	DF	FIN	Jean-Claude Mabinda (loan return to (Finland) IF Gnistan)
—	DF	JPN	Wataru Oguchi (free agent)
—	MF	FIN	Santeri Pohjolainen (to (Finland) TPS)
—	DF	FIN	Amos Ramström (to (Finland) FC Honka)
—	DF	FIN	Miska Rautiola (to (Finland) Salon Palloilijat)
—	MF	JPN	Yusuke Sasabe (free agent)
—	GK	FIN	Joona Tiainen (to (Finland) FC Lahti)
—	FW	FIN	Sakari Tukiainen (to (Spain) CD Manchego Ciudad Real)
—	DF	FIN	Gullit Zolameso (to (Finland) Riihimäen Palloseura)

=== Klubi 04 ===
In:

No.	Pos.	Nation	Player

Out:

No.	Pos.	Nation	Player
—	FW	FIN	Salem Bouajila (loan to (Austria) SV Ried II)

=== Käpylän Pallo ===
In:

No.	Pos.	Nation	Player
—	FW	FIN	Samuel Anini Junior (from (Finland) Ekenäs IF)
—	MF	FIN	Denis Cukici (from (Finland) SJK Seinäjoki)
—	MF	FIN	Niklas Leinonen (from (Finland) PK Keski-Uusimaa)
—	FW	GAM	Foday Manneh (from (Finland) PK-35)

Out:

No.	Pos.	Nation	Player
—	MF	FIN	Arttu Auranen (to (Finland) HIFK)
—	MF	FIN	Benjamin Heikkinen (to (Finland) FC Honka)
—	GK	FIN	Otto Hautamo (free agent)
—	MF	FIN	Mikko Kuningas (to (Italy) AC Crema 1908)
—	MF	FIN	Samuel Tammivuori (to (Sweden) GIF Sundsvall)
—	MF	FIN	Maximo Tolonen (to (Finland) PK-35)
—	FW	FIN	Miro Turunen (loan return to (Finland) SJK Akatemia)
—	MF	FIN	Aleksi Wahlman (to (Finland) HIFK)

=== FC Lahti ===
In:

No.	Pos.	Nation	Player
—	DF	BRA	Pedro Casagrande (from (Finland) Anadia)
—	DF	POR	Martim Ferreira (from (Malta) Zabbar St. Patrick)
—	MF	FIN	Noel Hasa (loan from (Finland) Ilves)
—	MF	FIN	Daniel Heikkinen (from (Finland) AC Oulu)
—	FW	FIN	Vilho Huovila (loan return from (Finland) MP)
—	MF	FRA	Abdoulaye Kanté (from (Finland) Ilves)
—	FW	FIN	Aaron Lindholm (from (Finland) PK Keski-Uusimaa)
—	FW	FIN	Jonathan Muzinga (from (Finland) KuPS)
—	DF	BRA	David Oliveira (loan from (Finland) Ilves)
—	MF	GHA	Eric Oteng (from (Finland) KPV Kokkola)
—	MF	GBS	Manuel Pami (from (Luxembourg) Differdange 03)
—	MF	FIN	Asla Peltola (loan from (Finland) AC Oulu)
—	DF	FRA	Romain Sans (free agent)
—	GK	FIN	Joona Tiainen (from (Finland) JäPS)

Out:

No.	Pos.	Nation	Player
—	DF	BRA	Pablo Andrade (to (Indonesia) Persija Jakarta)
—	FW	POR	Jordão Cardoso (to (Bahrain) A'Ali SC)
—	DF	AUS	Dylan Fox (to (Singapore) Tampines Rovers)
—	FW	AUS	Luke Ivanovic (to (United States) Monterey Bay FC)
—	MF	FIN	Tommi Jäntti (free agent)
—	DF	FIN	Daniel Koskipalo (free agent)
—	MF	FIN	Marius Könkkölä (to (Finland) SJK Seinäjoki)
—	FW	ARG	Michael López (to (Hungary) Kecskeméti TE)
—	MF	BRA	Luquinhas (to (Albania) KF Skënderbeu Korçë)
—	GK	SWE	David Mikhail (loan return to (Sweden) IFK Värnamo)
—	MF	BIH	Benjamin Mulahalilovic (to (Lithuania) FK Riteriai)
—	MF	FIN	Samuel Pasanen (to (Finland) KuPS)
—	DF	FIN	Riku Selander (to (Finland) FC Haka)
—	DF	AUT	Felix Strauß (to (Bulgaria) Spartak Varna)
—	DF	FIN	Julius Tauriainen (free agent)
—	DF	FIN	Mikko Viitikko (loan return to (Sweden) Trelleborgs FF)
—	MF	FIN	Eemeli Virta (free agent)

=== PK-35 ===
In:

No.	Pos.	Nation	Player
—	GK	GRE	Dimitrios Goumas (loan from (Greece) AEK Athens F.C.)
—	MF	FIN	Maximo Tolonen (from (Finland) Käpylän Pallo)
—	MF	NGR	Umar Bala Mohammed (from (Finland) TPS)
—	MF	FIN	Emil Pallas (from (Finland) Ekenäs IF)

Out:

No.	Pos.	Nation	Player
—	FW	LTU	Eridanas Bagužas (loan return to (Lithuania) FC Džiugas Telšiai)
—	MF	FIN	Reza Heidari (to (Finland) JäPS)
—	MF	JPN	Hiroki Nekado (to (Brunei) Kasuka FC)

=== Salon Palloilijat ===
In:

No.	Pos.	Nation	Player
—	FW	POR	Mário Gassamá (from (Spain) Vélez CF)
—	MF	FIN	Jan Heinonen (from (Finland) MP)
—	FW	FIN	Otto Lehtisalo (from (Finland) Inter Turku, previously on loan at SalPa)
—	DF	SOM	Fahad Mohamed (from (Finland) Ekenäs IF)
—	MF	FIN	Eemeli Mäkelä (from (Finland) FC Haka)
—	DF	FIN	Miska Rautiola (from (Finland) JäPS)
—	DF	FIN	Aaro Tiihonen (from (Finland) RoPS)
—	DF	FIN	Benjamin Urgenc (from (Finland) Mikkelin Palloilijat)
—	GK	FIN	Lauri Vetri (loan from (Finland) VPS)

Out:

No.	Pos.	Nation	Player
—	MF	SCO	Keir Foster (to (Scotland) Bo'ness United F.C.)
—	DF	USA	Ian Garrett (to (United States) FC Naples)
—	DF	FIN	Frans Grönlund (to (Finland) Åbo IFK)
—	FW	FIN	Olli Jakonen (to (Finland) VPS)
—	MF	FIN	Julius Järvinen (to (Sweden) FC Gute)
—	DF	ESP	Guillem Porta (to (Spain) CFJ Mollerussa)
—	MF	FIN	Maximus Tainio (to (Finland) Jippo)

=== SJK Akatemia ===
In:

No.	Pos.	Nation	Player
—	GK	NGR	Samuel James (from (Nigeria) Mavlon FC)
—	DF	FIN	Adam Zahedi (from (Finland) PK Keski-Uusimaa)

Out:

No.	Pos.	Nation	Player
—	FW	GHA	Emmanuel Akansase (loan to (Ghana) Vision FC)
—	DF	GHA	Bob Nii Armah (loan return to (Ghana) SC Accra)
—	FW	FIN	Artur Atarah (to (Finland) IF Gnistan)
—	FW	GUI	Saïdou Bah (to (Finland) Ekenäs IF)
—	FW	FIN	Eemeli Honkola (to (Republic of Ireland) Kerry)
—	DF	FIN	Tuomas Koivisto (to (Finland) SJK Seinäjoki)
—	DF	FIN	Joona Lahdenmäki (free agent)
—	DF	FIN	Gabriel Oksanen (to (Finland) SJK Seinäjoki)
—	MF	BRA	Vinícius Ribeiro (free agent)
—	MF	NGR	Nathaniel Tahmbi (to (Finland) SJK Seinäjoki)
—	FW	BEN	Olatoundji Tessilimi (to (Finland) SJK Seinäjoki)
—	FW	SLE	Moses Turay (to (Saudi Arabia) Al Raed FC)
—	FW	FIN	Miro Turunen (to (Finland) Jippo, previously on loan at Käpylän Pallo)

=== TPS ===
In:

No.	Pos.	Nation	Player
—	DF	FIN	Jesper Aitos (from (Finland) TPS U19)
—	FW	FIN	Oscar Dahlfors (from (Finland) EPS)
—	FW	FIN	Rasmus Harjanne (from (Finland) TPS U19)
—	GK	FIN	Niklas Harju (from (Finland) TPS U19)
—	FW	FIN	Onni Helén (loan return from (Finland) FC Jazz)
—	MF	JPN	Emu Kawakita (from (Spain) Casalarreina CF)
—	MF	FIN	Santeri Pohjolainen (from (Finland) JäPS)
—	FW	FIN	Nino Rajamäki (from (Finland) TPS U19)
—	DF	FIN	Akim Sairinen (from (Finland) MP)
—	MF	FIN	Tomi Väkiparta (from (Finland) FC Jazz)

Out:

No.	Pos.	Nation	Player
—	DF	AUT	Mehdi Hetemaj (to (Austria) SV Lafnitz)
—	MF	FIN	Jesper Karlsson (to (Finland) Ekenäs IF)
—	DF	FIN	Joonas Lakkamäki (to (Finland) VPS)
—	DF	GHA	Baba Mensah (free agent)
—	FW	NGR	Umar Bala Mohammed (to (Finland) PK-35)
—	GK	FIN	Matias Niemelä (free agent)
—	GK	FIN	Luka Nokelainen (free agent)
—	DF	FIN	Roope Pakkanen (to (Finland) Ekenäs IF)
—	MF	FIN	Eino-Iivari Pitkälä (to (Finland) PK-35)
—	MF	FIN	Riku Riski (free agent)
—	MF	FIN	Niilo Saarikivi (to (Finland) FC Honka)
—	FW	FIN	Riku Sjöroos (to (Finland) Peimari United)
—	DF	FIN	Aaro Soiniemi (loan return to (Finland) HJK Helsinki)
—	FW	GUI	Mohamed Toure (to (Finland) KuPS)
—	FW	FIN	Antti Ulmanen (to (Finland) HIFK)
—	DF	FIN	Eero Uusitalo (free agent, previously on loan at (Finland) FC Jazz)

== See also ==
- 2025 Veikkausliiga
- 2025 Ykkösliiga
