= Vetri =

Vetri may refer to:

- Lauri Vetri, Finnish footballer
- Vetri (film), a 1984 Indian film
- Victoria Vetri (born 1944), American model and actress
- Vetri (cinematographer), Indian cinematographer
- Vetri (actor), Indian actor
