= 2025 SJK season =

Seinäjoen Jalkapallokerho
2025 season
- Veikkausliiga: Pre-season
- Finnish Cup: Pre-season
- Finnish League Cup: Group stage
- UEFA Conference League: Pre-season

The 2025 season is the 18th overall and 11th consecutive in the Veikkausliiga for SJK Seinäjoki. The club will also take part in the Finnish Cup, Finnish League Cup, and UEFA Europa Conference League qualifiers.

== Squad ==
=== Transfers In ===
Pos.	Player	Transferred from	Fee	Date	Source
DF	(Cape Verde) Kelvin Pires	(Slovakia) AS Trenčín	Undisclosed	1 January 2025	

=== Transfers Out ===
Pos.	Player	Transferred to	Fee	Date	Source
DF	(Finland) Dario Naamo	(Austria) SKN St. Pölten	€200,000	1 January 2025	
MF	(Malaysia) Nooa Laine	(Malaysia) Selangor	€115,000	1 January 2025	
MF	(Finland) Pyry Hannola	(Poland) Stal Mielec	Loan	5 January 2025	
FW	(Sierra Leone) Moses Turay	(Saudi Arabia) Al Raed	€30.000	7 January 2025	
DF	(Ivory Coast) Ibrahim Cissé	(Lithuania) Džiugas Telšiai	Undisclosed	8 January 2025	
FW	(Nicaragua) Jaime Moreno	(Indonesia) PS Barito Putera	Free	11 January 2025	
MF	(Finland) Denis Cukici	(Finland) KäPa	Free	13 January 2025	

== Competitions ==
=== Overall record ===
Competition	Starting round	Record							
Competition	Starting round	Pld	W	D	L	GF	GA	GD	Win %
Veikkausliiga	Matchday 1	0	0	0	0	0	0	+0	—
Finnish Cup		0	0	0	0	0	0	+0	—
Finnish League Cup		0	0	0	0	0	0	+0	—
Total		0	0	0	0	0	0	+0	—

Source: Competitions

=== Finnish League Cup ===
==== Results by round ====
Round	1
Ground	
Result	
Position	

Updated to match(es) played on August 2024. Source:
A = Away; H = Home; W = Win; D = Draw; L = Loss

1	SJK	v
