= Madou Diakité =

Malian footballer (born 2004)

Personal information
- Full name: Madou Diakité Koumah
- Date of birth: 22 July 2004 (age 22)
- Place of birth: Mali
- Height: 1.88 m (6 ft 2 in)
- Position: Goalkeeper

Senior career*
Years	Team	Apps	(Gls)
2022–2023	Terracina	0	(0)
2023–2026	Triestina	0	(0)
2025	→ KTP (loan)	5	(0)
2025	→ Haminan Pallo-Kissat (loan)	1	(0)

International career^{‡}
2023	Mali U23	1	(0)
- * Club domestic league appearances and goals as of 10 March 2026 ‡ National team caps and goals as of 4 July 2023

Madou Diakité Koumah (born 22 July 2004) is a Malian professional footballer who plays as a goalkeeper.

== Club career ==
Diakité signed a two-year contract with Triestina on 6 October 2023.

Diakité was loaned to KTP on March 21, 2025. He debuted in Veikkausliiga on 2 May, after coming on for a sent-off Jiri Koski, in a home loss to AC Oulu.
