= Marius Könkkölä =

Finnish footballer (born 2003)

Personal information
- Full name: Marius Nooa Könkkölä
- Date of birth: 31 October 2003 (age 23)
- Place of birth: Espoo, Finland
- Height: 1.72 m (5 ft 8 in)
- Position: Midfielder

Team information
- Current team: TPS
- Number: 10

Youth career
- 2008–2009: KulPS
- 2009–2011: SAPA
- 2011–2014: KäPa
- 2014–2019: HJK
- 2020–2021: Genk

Senior career*
Years	Team	Apps	(Gls)
2022	AC Oulu	15	(0)
2022	→ OLS (loan)	4	(1)
2023–2024	Lahti	30	(0)
2025	SJK	1	(0)
2025	SJK II	13	(3)
2025–	TPS	34	(7)

International career^{‡}
	Finland U15	3	(0)
2019	Finland U16	5	(1)
2019	Finland U17	2	(0)
- * Club domestic league appearances and goals as of 13 November 2026 ‡ National team caps and goals as of 13 November 2023

Marius Nooa Könkkölä (born 31 October 2003) is a Finnish professional footballer who plays as a midfielder for Veikkausliiga club TPS.

== Early years ==
Born in Espoo, Könkkölä started playing football in KulPS in Kulosaari, Helsinki at the age of 5. One year later, his family moved to Katajanokka and he joined SAPA. Two years later, he moved to renowned Käpylän Pallo youth academy. In 2014, he started playing in HJK youth sector.

Könkkölä had trials with Aston Villa, Genk and PSV, before accepting an offer from Genk and moving to Belgium in the early 2020.

== Club career ==
=== AC Oulu ===
After two years in the Genk academy, Könkkölä returned to Finland and signed a two-year deal with Veikkausliiga side AC Oulu on 31 December 2021. His 2022 season was incomplete as he suffered an injury, and could not establish his place in the starting line-up, mainly playing rotational minutes off the bench. After the season, Könkkölä decided to leave the club after the head coach Ricardo Duarte had stated that Könkkölä was not in his plans for the next season.

=== FC Lahti ===
On 15 November 2022, Könkkölä transferred to fellow Veikkausliiga club FC Lahti on a two-year deal. Könkkölä suffered an injury again during the 2023 season, and he was mostly in and out of the line-up since May until September, when he was ruled out for the rest of the season.

=== SJK ===
On 14 November 2024, Könkkölä signed with SJK Seinäjoki on a two-year deal with a one-year option.

== International career ==
Könkkölä has represented Finland at under-15, under-16, and under-17 youth national team levels.

== Personal life ==
His father Justus Könkkölä, a former footballer, has also played for FC Lahti in 1998.

== Career statistics ==
As of 14 August 2025

Appearances and goals by club, season and competition
Club	Season	League			National cup (Note: Includes Suomen Cup)		League cup (Note: Includes Finnish League Cup)		Europe		Total	
Club	Season	Division	Apps	Goals	Apps	Goals	Apps	Goals	Apps	Goals	Apps	Goals
OLS	2022	Kakkonen	4	1	—		—		—		4	1
AC Oulu	2022	Veikkausliiga	15	0	4	2	3	0	—		22	2
Lahti	2023	Veikkausliiga	12	0	1	1	5	0	—		18	1
Lahti	2024	Veikkausliiga	18	0	3	1	4	0	—		25	1
Lahti	Total		30	0	4	2	9	0	0	0	43	2
SJK Seinäjoki	2025	Veikkausliiga	1	0	0	0	4	1	0	0	5	1
SJK Akatemia	2025	Ykkösliiga	13	3	0	0	0	0	–		13	3
TPS	2025	Ykkösliiga	0	0	–		–		–		0	0
Career total			63	4	8	4	16	1	0	0	87	9
