= Arttu Tulehmo =

Finnish footballer (born 2007)

Personal information
- Date of birth: 2 May 2007 (age 19)
- Place of birth: Tampere, Finland
- Height: 1.71 m (5 ft 7 in)
- Position: Attacking midfielder

Team information
- Current team: KTP
- Number: 20

Youth career
- 2011–2023: Ilves

Senior career*
Years	Team	Apps	(Gls)
2023–2025	Ilves II	24	(4)
2024–2025	Ilves	1	(0)
2025	→ KTP (loan)	4	(0)
2026–	KTP	12	(2)

International career^{‡}
2021–2022	Finland U15	4	(0)
2023	Finland U16	3	(3)
2023–	Finland U17	16	(4)
- * Club domestic league appearances and goals as of 1 November 2026 ‡ National team caps and goals as of 6 January 2025

Arttu Tulehmo (born 2 May 2007) is a Finnish professional footballer playing as an attacking midfielder for Ykkösliiga side KTP.

== Early career ==
Tulehmo is a product of the youth academy of his home town club Ilves. He started to play football in the club's youth team when he was four years old. In the summer 2022, Tulehmo was among the five youth players to sign a development contract with Ilves.

== Club career ==
Tulehmo made his senior debut in 2023 with the club's reserve team Ilves II, playing in the third-tier league Kakkonen Group B. He played in a total of eight matches and scored once in the 2023 Kakkonen season. He was also named in the Ilves first team line-up on 5 July 2023, in the 2023 Finnish Cup quarter final win against VJS, but remained an unused substitute.

On 4 January 2024, at the age of 16, Tulehmo signed his first professional contract with Ilves on a three-year deal. He debuted with the first team on 3 February 2024, in a Finnish League Cup match against Vaasan Palloseura (VPS). On 12 June 2024, Tulehmo debuted in Veikkausliiga, in a 2–0 away win against Inter Turku.

Tulehmo was loaned out to KTP for the 2025 season.

== International career ==
Tulehmo has represented Finland regularly at youth national teams at under-15, under-16 and under-17 levels. On 6 May 2023, Tulehmo scored a hat-trick for Finland U16, in a 3–1 friendly win against Wales U16.

== Career statistics ==
As of 26 July 2026

Appearances and goals by club, season and competition
Club	Season	League			Cup (Note: Includes Suomen Cup)		League cup (Note: Includes Finnish League Cup)		Europe		Total	
Club	Season	Division	Apps	Goals	Apps	Goals	Apps	Goals	Apps	Goals	Apps	Goals
Ilves II	2023	Kakkonen	8	1	–		–		–		8	1
Ilves II	2024	Kakkonen	16	3	–		–		–		16	3
Ilves II	Total		24	4	0	0	0	0	0	0	24	4
Ilves	2024	Veikkausliiga	1	0	0	0	1	0	0	0	2	0
KTP (loan)	2025	Veikkausliiga	4	0	2	0	5	0	–		11	0
KTP	2026	Ykkösliiga	7	2	0	0	0	0	–		7	2
Career total			36	6	2	0	6	0	0	0	44	6

== Honours ==
Ilves

- Veikkausliiga runner-up: 2024
