= Jesper Karlsson (footballer, born 2000) =

Finnish footballer (born 2000)

Personal information
- Date of birth: 7 February 2000 (age 26)
- Place of birth: Finland
- Height: 1.75 m (5 ft 9 in)
- Position: Central midfielder

Team information
- Current team: Haka
- Number: 8

Youth career
- –2018: TPS

Senior career*
Years	Team	Apps	(Gls)
2018–2019	TPS II	8	(0)
2018–2024	TPS	112	(2)
2018–2019	→ SalPa (loan)	16	(0)
2025	EIF	23	(0)
2026–	Haka	24	(3)

International career^{‡}
2018	Finland U18	5	(0)
- * Club domestic league appearances and goals as of 1 November 2026 ‡ National team caps and goals as of 19 February 2024

Jesper Karlsson (born 7 February 2000) is a Finnish professional footballer who plays as a central midfielder for Ykkösliiga club Haka.

== Club career ==
Karlsson advanced through the youth program of Turun Palloseura (TPS), and debuted with the first team in the 2019 season.

In January 2025, he left TPS and signed for EIF in second-tier Ykkösliiga.

== Career statistics ==
As of 26 July 2026.

Appearances and goals by club, season and competition
Club	Season	League			Cup (Note: Includes Suomen Cup)		League cup (Note: Includes Ykkönen Cup and Ykkösliigacup)		Europe		Total	
Club	Season	Division	Apps	Goals	Apps	Goals	Apps	Goals	Apps	Goals	Apps	Goals
TPS II	2018	Vitonen	1	0	–		–		–		1	0
TPS II	2019	Nelonen	2	0	–		–		–		2	0
TPS II	2020	Kolmonen	5	0	–		–		–		5	0
TPS II	Total		8	0	0	0	–	–	–	–	8	0
TPS	2018	Veikkausliiga	0	0	0	0	–		–		0	0
TPS	2019	Ykkönen	9	0	3	0	–		–		12	0
TPS	2020	Veikkausliiga	5	0	5	0	–		–		10	0
TPS	2021	Ykkönen	21	0	2	0	–		–		23	0
TPS	2022	Ykkönen	29	0	2	0	6	1	–		37	1
TPS	2023	Ykkönen	24	1	0	0	2	0	–		26	1
TPS	2024	Ykkösliiga	24	1	5	1	0	0	–		29	2
TPS	Total		112	2	17	1	8	1	–	–	137	4
SalPa (loan)	2018	Kakkonen	9	0	–		–		–		9	0
SalPa (loan)	2019	Kakkonen	7	0	–		–		–		7	0
SalPa (loan)	Total		16	0	0	0	–	–	–	–	16	0
EIF	2025	Ykkösliiga	23	0	2	0	4	1	–		29	1
Haka	2026	Ykkösliiga	14	2	3	1	4	0	–		21	3
Career total			173	4	22	2	16	2	0	0	211	8

== Honours ==
TPS

- Ykkönen runner-up: 2019, 2022
