= Miro Turunen =

Finnish footballer (born 2003)

Personal information
- Date of birth: 31 January 2003 (age 23)
- Place of birth: Finland
- Position: Forward

Team information
- Current team: Jippo
- Number: 9

Youth career
- –2016: SC Riverball
- 2016–2019: Jippo

Senior career*
Years	Team	Apps	(Gls)
2019	LehPa–77	10	(15)
2019–2022	Jippo	52	(16)
2023–2024	SJK	0	(0)
2023–2024	SJK II	22	(7)
2024	→ KäPa (loan)	24	(7)
2024	→ NJS (loan)	1	(1)
2025–	Jippo	51	(13)

International career^{‡}
- Finland U18
- * Club domestic league appearances and goals as of 1 November 2026 ‡ National team caps and goals as of 10 March 2024

Miro Turunen (born 31 January 2003) is a Finnish professional footballer who plays as a forward for Ykkösliiga club Jippo.

== Club career ==
In late December 2024, Turunen returned to his former club Jippo on a two-year deal.

== Career statistics ==
As of 26 July 2026.

Appearances and goals by club, season and competition
Club	Season	League			Cup (Note: Includes Suomen Cup)		League cup (Note: Includes Finnish League Cup, Ykköscup and Ykkösliigacup)		Other		Total	
Club	Season	Division	Apps	Goals	Apps	Goals	Apps	Goals	Apps	Goals	Apps	Goals
LehPa-77	2019	Kolmonen	10	15	–		–		3 (Note: Appearances in UEFA Regions' Cup)	2	13	17
Jippo	2019	Kakkonen	5	0	–		–		–		5	0
Jippo	2020	Kakkonen	2	1	0	0	–		–		2	1
Jippo	2021	Ykkönen	20	0	3	0	–		–		23	0
Jippo	2022	Kakkonen	25	15	3	2	–		–		28	17
Jippo	Total		52	16	6	2	0	0	0	0	58	18
SJK	2023	Veikkausliiga	0	0	1	1	0	0	–		1	1
SJK Akatemia	2023	Ykkönen	22	7	–		3	2	–		25	9
SJK Akatemia	2024	Ykkösliiga	0	0	0	0	3	0	–		3	0
SJK Akatemia	Total		22	7	0	0	6	2	0	0	28	9
Käpylän Pallo (loan)	2024	Ykkösliiga	24	7	1	1	1	1	–		26	9
NJS (loan)	2024	Kakkonen	1	1	–		–		–		1	1
Jippo	2025	Ykkösliiga	26	5	1	0	6	2	–		33	7
Jippo	2026	Ykkösliiga	14	5	0	0	5	3	–		19	8
Jippo	Total		40	10	1	0	11	5	0	0	52	15
Career total			149	56	9	4	18	8	3	2	179	70
