= Juho Lehtiranta =

Finnish footballer (born 2002)

Personal information
- Date of birth: 27 September 2002 (age 24)
- Place of birth: Sipoo, Finland
- Height: 1.74 m (5 ft 9 in)
- Position: Right back

Team information
- Current team: Jippo
- Number: 12

Youth career
- Kellokosken Alku
- TuPS
- –2020: HJK

Senior career*
Years	Team	Apps	(Gls)
2019–2021	Klubi 04	38	(0)
2022–2023	KTP	33	(2)
2022	→ PeKa (loan)	4	(0)
2023	→ PEPO (loan)	1	(0)
2024	AC Oulu	19	(0)
2025	KTP	18	(0)
2026–	Jippo	27	(1)

International career^{‡}
2018–2019	Finland U17	16	(0)
2019	Finland U18	2	(0)
2021	Finland U20	2	(0)
2024	Finland U21	2	(0)
Medal record
KTP
First place	Ykkönen	2022
- * Club domestic league appearances and goals as of 1 November 2026 ‡ National team caps and goals as of 26 March 2024

Juho Lehtiranta (born 27 September 2002) is a Finnish professional footballer who plays as a right back for Ykkösliiga club Jippo.

== Club career ==
Lehtiranta started football with Kellokosken Alku, before joining HJK Helsinki youth sector. He made his senior debut with Klubi 04, the reserve team of HJK, in 2019.

After playing with Klubi 04, Lehtiranta joined Kotkan Työväen Palloilijat (KTP) in Ykkönen on 26 December 2021. He made his Veikkausliiga debut with KTP in the 2023 season, and scored two goals in the league. He extended his deal with the club on 2 August 2023, but after KTP were relegated, his contract was terminated, and he signed with fellow Veikkausliiga club AC Oulu on 24 November 2023.

Lehtiranta spent one season in Oulu, before on 31 October 2024 it was announced he would return to KTP for the 2025 Veikkausliiga season.

== Career statistics ==
As of 26 July 2026

Appearances and goals by club, season and competition
Club	Season	League			Cup (Note: Includes Suomen Cup)		League cup (Note: Includes Kakkonen Cup, Ykkönen Cup and Finnish League Cup)		Europe		Total	
Club	Season	Division	Apps	Goals	Apps	Goals	Apps	Goals	Apps	Goals	Apps	Goals
Klubi 04	2019	Kakkonen	5	0	—		—		—		5	0
Klubi 04	2020	Kakkonen	13	0	—		3	0	—		16	0
Klubi 04	2021	Ykkönen	20	0	2	0	—		—		22	0
Klubi 04	Total		38	0	2	0	3	0	0	0	43	0
KTP	2022	Ykkönen	14	0	3	0	3	0	—		20	0
KTP	2023	Veikkausliiga	19	2	5	0	5	0	—		29	2
KTP	Total		33	2	8	0	8	0	0	0	49	2
Peli-Karhut (loan)	2022	Kakkonen	4	0	—		—		—		4	0
PEPO (loan)	2023	Kakkonen	1	0	—		—		—		1	0
AC Oulu	2024	Veikkausliiga	19	0	4	0	5	0	—		28	0
KTP	2025	Veikkausliiga	19	0	2	0	5	0	–		27	0
Jippo	2026	Ykkösliiga	16	0	0	0	5	0	–		21	0
Career total			129	2	16	0	26	0	0	0	171	2

== Honours ==
Klubi 04

- Kakkonen Group B: 2020

KTP

- Ykkönen: 2022
