= Derrick Atta Agyei =

Ghanaian footballer (born 2003)

Personal information
- Full name: Derrick Atta Agyei
- Date of birth: 21 July 2003 (age 23)
- Place of birth: Ghana
- Position: Left back

Team information
- Current team: KTP
- Number: 3

Senior career*
Years	Team	Apps	(Gls)
2021–2023	Liberty Professionals	50	(5)
2023–2025	Dreams	41	(2)
2025	KuPS	3	(0)
2025	Kups Akatemia	2	(1)
2026–	KTP	23	(1)
- * Club domestic league appearances and goals as of 1 November 2026

Derrick Atta Agyei (born 21 July 2003) is a Ghanaian professional footballer who plays as a left back for Ykkösliiga club KTP.

== Club career ==
Atta Agyei started his senior career with Liberty Professionals in Ghanaian second-tier in 2021. During two seasons, he made 50 appearances and scored five goals in the division.

In 2023, he joined Ghana Premier League club Dreams FC, and also represented the club in the CAF Confederation Cup. He totalled 51 appearances, scoring two goals for Dreams.

In February 2025, Atta Agyei moved to Finland and signed with reigning champions Kuopion Palloseura (KuPS) in top-tier Veikkausliiga. Shortly after, he debuted with his new club in Finnish League Cup.

== Career statistics ==
As of 7 November 2026

Appearances and goals by club, season and competition
Club	Season	Division	League		National cup (Note: Includes Ghana FA Cup and Suomen Cup)		League cup (Note: Includes Finnish League Cup)		Continental		Total	
Club	Season	Division	Apps	Goals	Apps	Goals	Apps	Goals	Apps	Goals	Apps	Goals
Liberty Professionals	2021–22	Ghana Division One	25	2	–		–		–		25	2
Liberty Professionals	2022–23	Ghana Division One	25	3	–		–		–		25	3
Liberty Professionals	Total		50	5	0	0	0	0	0	0	50	5
Dreams	2023–24	Ghana Premier League	27	2	2	0	–		8 (Note: Appearances in CAF Confederation Cup)	0	37	2
Dreams	2024–25	Ghana Premier League	14	0	0	0	–		–		14	0
Dreams	Total		41	2	2	0	0	0	8	0	51	2
KuPS	2025	Veikkausliiga	2	0	1	0	4	0	0	0	7	0
KTP	2026	Ykkösliiga	23	1	0	0	6	0	0	0	29	1
Career total			116	8	3	0	10	0	8	0	137	8
