= Nuutti Kaikkonen =

Finnish footballer (born 2003)

Personal information
- Date of birth: 10 April 2003 (age 23)
- Place of birth: Joensuu, Finland
- Height: 1.98 m (6 ft 6 in)
- Position: Goalkeeper

Team information
- Current team: Jippo

Youth career
- Jippo

Senior career*
| Years | Team | Apps | (Gls) |
| 2019–2021 | LehPa | 4 | (0) |
| 2019–2021 | Jippo | 3 | (0) |
| 2022–2024 | OLS | 50 | (0) |
| 2022–2024 | AC Oulu | 1 | (0) |
| 2025– | Jippo | 0 | (0) |
- * Club domestic league appearances and goals as of 19 October 2024

Nuutti Kaikkonen (born 10 April 2003) is a Finnish professional footballer who plays as a goalkeeper for Ykkösliiga side Jippo.

== Career ==
Kaikkonen was born in Joensuu and played for local clubs Jippo and Lehmon Pallo-77.

On 28 December 2021, Kaikkonen moved to Oulu and signed with AC Oulu on a two-year deal with an option for an additional year. Kaikkonen made his Veikkausliiga debut on 16 October 2022, in a home loss to Ilves.

During the 2022 and 2023 seasons, Kaikkonen played mostly in OLS, the reserve team of AC Oulu, in the third-tier league Kakkonen, helping the team earn a spot in Ykkönen for the 2024 season.

On 15 November 2023, AC Oulu exercised their option and extended his contract for the 2024 season.

Kaikkonen returned to Jippo for the 2025 season.
