= Nathaniel Tahmbi =

Nigerian footballer (born 2003)

Personal information
- Date of birth: 20 July 2003 (age 23)
- Place of birth: Nigeria
- Height: 1.93 m (6 ft 4 in)
- Positions: Centre back; defensive midfielder

Team information
- Current team: KTP
- Number: 13

Youth career
- Box2Box FC

Senior career*
Years	Team	Apps	(Gls)
2024	SJK Akatemia	11	(2)
2024	SJK Akatemia 2	9	(1)
2025	SJK	3	(0)
2025–	KTP	34	(2)
- * Club domestic league appearances and goals as of 1 November 2026

Nathaniel Tahmbi (born 20 July 2003) is a Nigerian football player who plays as a centre back or defensive midfielder for Ykkösliiga club KTP.

== Career ==
After starting football in his native Nigeria, Tahmbi moved to Finland in March 2024 after signing with SJK Seinäjoki organisation. He was first assigned to the club's academy teams playing in Finnish second tier and fourth tier. On 23 April 2025, he made his Veikkausliiga debut with SJK first team against AC Oulu.

On 4 July 2025, Tahmbi joined Veikkausliiga club KTP, in a swap transfer after SJK acquired Armaan Wilson from KTP.
