= Mmenie-Abasi Etok =

Nigerian footballer (born 2003)

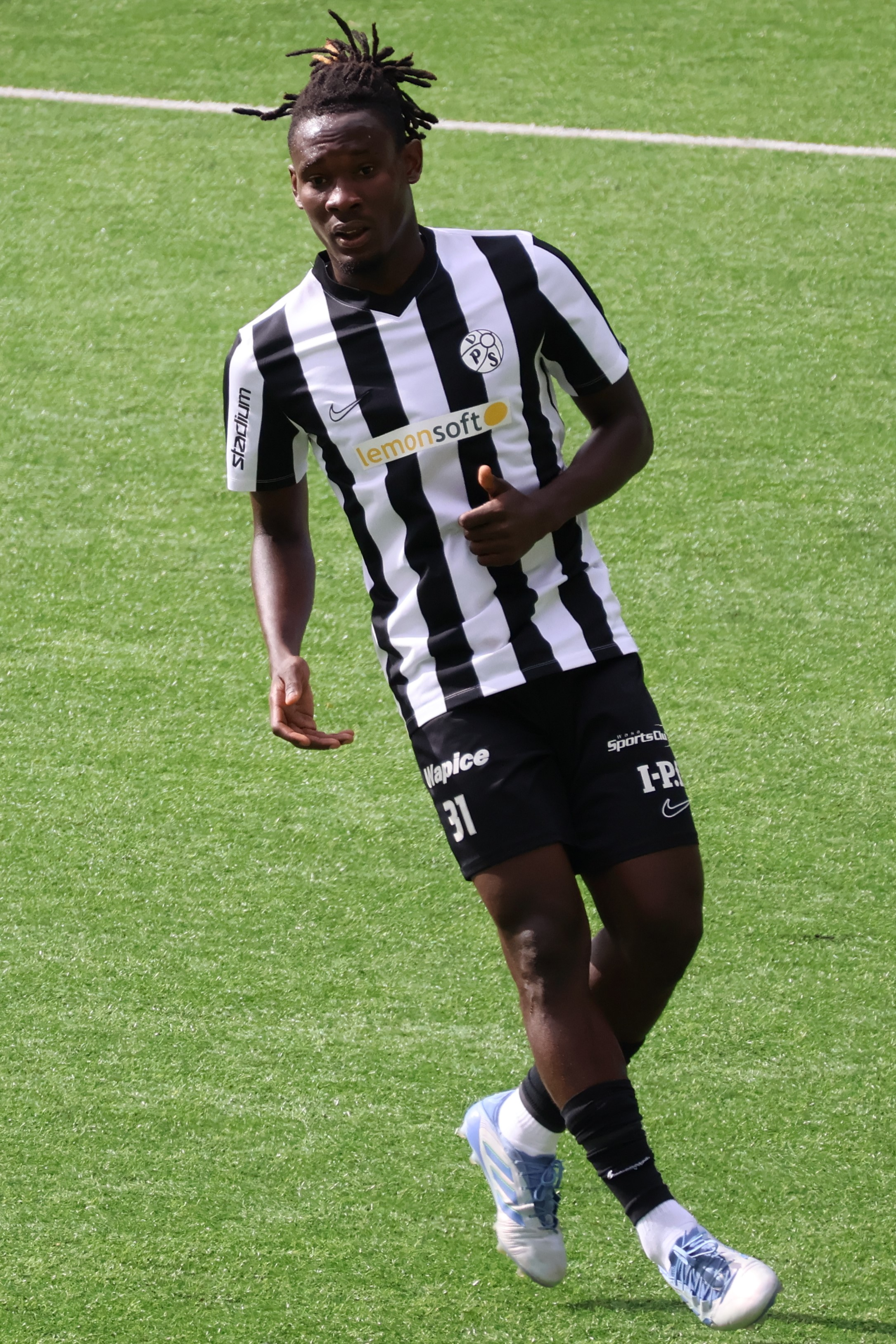
- Etok with VPS II in 2025

Personal information
- Full name: Mmenie-Abasi Ita Etok
- Date of birth: 2 December 2003 (age 22)
- Place of birth: Ibiono-Ibom, Nigeria
- Height: 1.80 m (5 ft 11 in)
- Position: Central midfielder

Team information
- Current team: VPS
- Number: 17

Youth career
- Young Stars FC
- Donaldini Academy
- Klassisch Academy

Senior career*
Years	Team	Apps	(Gls)
2023–2024	Jazz	37	(6)
2025–	VPS	7	(0)
2025	VPS II	9	(1)
- * Club domestic league appearances and goals as of 20 November 2025

Mmenie-Abasi Ita Etok (born 2 December 2003) is a Nigerian professional football player who plays as a central midfielder for Veikkausliiga club VPS.

== Club career ==
After starting football in his native Nigeria, Etok moved to Finland in 2023 and signed with FC Jazz in third-tier Kakkonen.

In November 2024, Etok joined Veikkausliiga club Vaasan Palloseura, with a deal starting in the 2025 season.

== Career statistics ==
As of 17 May 2025

Appearances and goals by club, season and competition
Club	Season	League			National cup (Note: Includes Suomen Cup)		League cup (Note: Includes Finnish League Cup)		Total	
Club	Season	Division	Apps	Goals	Apps	Goals	Apps	Goals	Apps	Goals
Jazz	2023	Kakkonen	21	3	2	0	–		23	3
Jazz	2024	Ykkönen	16	3	1	0	–		17	3
Jazz	Total		37	6	3	0	0	0	40	6
VPS	2025	Veikkausliiga	1	0	1	0	5	0	7	0
VPS Akatemia	2025	Kakkonen	1	0	–		–		1	0
Career total			39	6	4	0	5	0	48	6
