= Sami Sipola =

Finnish footballer (born 2001)

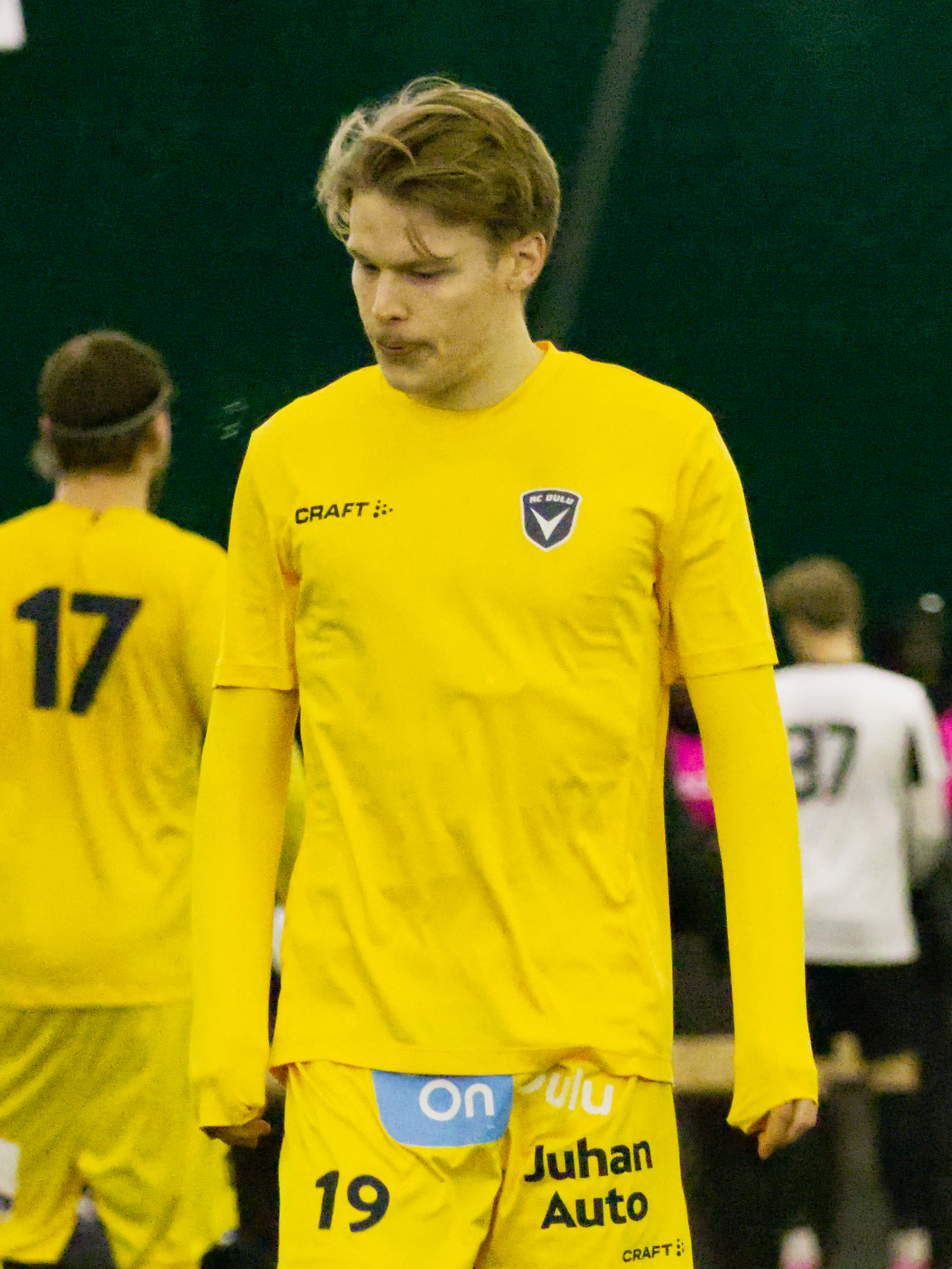
- Sipola with AC Oulu in 2026

Personal information
- Date of birth: 25 December 2001 (age 24)
- Place of birth: Finland
- Position: Right back

Team information
- Current team: AC Oulu
- Number: 2

Youth career
- OLS Oulu
- Tervarit
- HauPa

Senior career*
| Years | Team | Apps | (Gls) |
| 2019–2020 | SJK | 0 | (0) |
| 2019–2022 | SJK II | 79 | (4) |
| 2021 | → RoPS (loan) | 10 | (0) |
| 2023 | KPV | 22 | (0) |
| 2024 | Jaro | 27 | (4) |
| 2025 | Inter Turku | 8 | (0) |
| 2025 | Jaro | 7 | (0) |
| 2026– | AC Oulu | 13 | (0) |

International career
| 2017 | Finland U16 | 2 | (0) |
| 2018 | Finland U17 | 6 | (0) |
- * Club domestic league appearances and goals as of 12 November 2026

Sami Sipola (born 25 December 2001) is a Finnish professional footballer who plays as a right back for Veikkausliiga club AC Oulu.

== Club career ==
Sipola grew up in Oulu and played in the youth sectors of local clubs Haukiputaan Pallo, Oulun Luistinseura and Tervarit.

During 2019–2022, he played for SJK Seinäjoki organisation, including a loan spell with RoPS in the second-tier Ykkönen in 2021.

After a lone season with Kokkolan Palloveikot, in January 2024 Sipola signed with FF Jaro in the new second-tier Ykkösliiga. On 12 August, when playing for Jaro, Sipola scored a hat-trick against JäPS in a 5–0 win.

On 4 January 2025, Sipola signed with Veikkausliiga club Inter Turku for the 2025 season.

After a return to Jaro, Sipola signed with Veikkausliiga club AC Oulu for the 2026 season and returned to his hometown.

== Honours ==
Inter Turku

- Finnish League Cup: 2025

Jaro

- Ykkösliiga runner-up: 2024

RoPS

- Ykkönen runner-up: 2021
