= Joona Tiainen =

Finnish footballer (born 2000)

Personal information
- Date of birth: 7 May 2000 (age 26)
- Height: 1.85 m (6 ft 1 in)
- Position: Goalkeeper

Team information
- Current team: Oskarshamns AIK

Senior career*
Years	Team	Apps	(Gls)
2017–2022	Lahti	21	(0)
2017	→ Kuusysi	3	(0)
2018	→ Espoo (loan)	5	(0)
2019	→ Espoo (loan)	2	(0)
2020–2022	→ Reipas Lahti	16	(0)
2023	HIFK	25	(0)
2024	JäPS	17	(0)
2025–2026	Lahti	1	(0)
2026–	Oskarshamns AIK	0	(0)
- * Club domestic league appearances and goals as of 13 March 2026

Joona Tiainen (born 7 May 2000) is a Finnish professional footballer who plays for Ettan Fotboll club Oskarshamns AIK as a goalkeeper.

== Career ==
On 28 December 2022, Tiainen signed a one-year contract with HIFK.
