= Eric Danso Boateng =

Ghanaian footballer (born 2004)

Eric Boateng
Personal information
- Full name: Eric Danso Boateng
- Date of birth: 23 March 2004 (age 22)
- Place of birth: Ghana
- Position: Centre back

Team information
- Current team: SalPa (on loan from KuPS)
- Number: 19

Senior career*
Years	Team	Apps	(Gls)
2022–2025	Dreams	50	(4)
2025–	KuPS	1	(0)
2025–	KuPS II	4	(1)
2025–	→ SalPa (loan)	10	(0)
- * Club domestic league appearances and goals as of 24 November 2025

Eric Danso Boateng (born 23 March 2004) is a Ghanaian professional footballer who plays as a centre back for SalPa, on loan from KuPS.

== Club career ==
Boateng started his senior career playing for Dreams FC in his native Ghana, competing in top-tier Ghana Premier League. He represented the club in the CAF Confederation Cup.

In February 2025, Boateng moved to Finland and signed with reigning champions Kuopion Palloseura (KuPS) in Veikkausliiga. Shortly after, he debuted with his new club in Finnish League Cup.

== International career ==
Boateng has received a call-up to the Ghana national team's CHAN squad, which consists of domestic players.

== Career statistics ==
As of 26 June 2025

Appearances and goals by club, season and competition
Club	Season	Division	League		National cup (Note: Includes Ghana FA Cup and Suomen Cup)		League cup (Note: Includes Finnish League Cup)		Continental		Other		Total	
Club	Season	Division	Apps	Goals	Apps	Goals	Apps	Goals	Apps	Goals	Apps	Goals	Apps	Goals
Dreams	2022–23	Ghana Premier League	12	1	1	0	–		–		–		13	1
Dreams	2023–24	Ghana Premier League	22	3	2	0	–		8 (Note: Appearances in CAF Confederation Cup)	0	1 (Note: Appearance in Ghana Super Cup)	0	33	3
Dreams	2024–25	Ghana Premier League	16	0	0	0	–		–		–		16	0
Dreams	Total		50	4	3	0	0	0	8	0	1	0	62	4
KuPS	2025	Veikkausliiga	1	0	1	0	3	0	0	0	–		5	0
KuPS II	2025	Ykkönen	4	1	–		–		–		–		4	1
SalPa (loan)	2025	Ykkösliiga	6	0	–		–		–		–		0	0
Career total			61	5	4	0	3	0	8	0	1	0	71	5

== Honours ==
Dreams

- Ghana FA Cup: 2022–23
- Ghana Super Cup runner-up: 2023
