= Thadée Kaleba =

French footballer (born 1999)

Personal information
- Full name: Thadée Oded Kaleba
- Date of birth: 20 April 1999 (age 27)
- Place of birth: Lyon, France
- Height: 1.86 m (6 ft 1 in)
- Position: Centre back

Team information
- Current team: Ekenäs IF
- Number: 22

Youth career
- 2007–2016: Lyon
- 2016–2019: Chievo

Senior career*
Years	Team	Apps	(Gls)
2019–2020	Amiens B	14	(0)
2020–2021	Molfetta	4	(0)
2021–2022	Solières Sport	25	(2)
2022–2024	Tabor Sežana	47	(1)
2024	Sportist Svoge	21	(0)
2025–	Ekenäs IF	36	(2)
- * Club domestic league appearances and goals as of 26 July 2026

Thadée Oded Kaleba (born 20 April 1999) is a French professional footballer who plays as a centre back for Ekenäs IF in Ykkösliiga.

== Career ==
After starting in his native France, Kaleba played in Italy, Belgium, Slovenia and Bulgaria, before moving to Finland in 2025 and signing with Ykkösliiga club Ekenäs IF.

== Personal life ==
His older brother Quentin is also a footballer.

== Career statistics ==
As of 2 June 2025

Appearances and goals by club, season and competition
Club	Season	League			National cup (Note: Includes Slovenian Cup, Bulgarian Cup and Suomen Cup)		Total	
Club	Season	Division	Apps	Goals	Apps	Goals	Apps	Goals
Amiens B	2019–20	National 3	14	0	–		14	0
Molfetta Sportiva 1917	2020–21	Serie D	4	0	–		4	0
Solières Sport	2021–22	Belgian Division 2	25	2	0	0	25	2
Tabor Sežana	2022–23	Slovenian PrvaLiga	23	0	0	0	23	0
Tabor Sežana	2023–24	2. SNL	24	1	1	1	25	2
Tabor Sežana	Total		47	1	1	1	48	2
Sportist Svoge	2024–25	Bulgarian Second League	21	0	1	0	22	0
Ekenäs IF	2025	Ykkösliiga	8	1	1	0	9	1
Career total			119	4	3	1	122	5
