= Mikael Almén =

Finnish football player (born 2000)

Personal information
- Date of birth: 8 March 2000 (age 26)
- Place of birth: Naantali, Finland
- Height: 1.83 m (6 ft 0 in)
- Position: Defender

Team information
- Current team: Jerv
- Number: 15

Youth career
- –2018: Ilves

Senior career*
Years	Team	Apps	(Gls)
2018–2022	Ilves	68	(4)
2018	→ HJS (loan)	6	(0)
2019–2020	→ Ilves II	20	(1)
2023–2024	Inter Turku	35	(3)
2025	Haka	18	(0)
2026–	Jerv	21	(0)

International career^{‡}
2018	Finland U18	2	(0)
2018	Finland U19	4	(0)
2020–2021	Finland U21	4	(0)
- * Club domestic league appearances and goals as of 14 November 2026 ‡ National team caps and goals as of 8 June 2021

Mikael Almén (born 8 March 2000) is a Finnish footballer who plays as a defender for Norwegian Second Division side Jerv.

== Club career ==
On 1 December 2022, Almén signed a contract with Inter Turku for the 2023 and 2024 seasons.
