= Johannes Viitala =

Finnish footballer (born 2006)

Personal information
- Date of birth: 10 August 2006 (age 20)
- Place of birth: Finland
- Height: 1.96 m (6 ft 5 in)
- Position: Goalkeeper

Team information
- Current team: Ilves
- Number: 35

Youth career
- Ilves

Senior career*
Years	Team	Apps	(Gls)
2023–2026	Ilves II	18	(0)
2023–2025	Ilves	3	(0)
2024	→ IFK Mariehamn (loan)	0	(0)
2025	→ IFK Mariehamn (loan)	10	(0)
2026–	SJK	5	(0)
2026–	SJK Akatemia	2	(0)

International career^{‡}
2021–2022	Finland U16	3	(0)
2022–2023	Finland U17	12	(0)
2023–	Finland U18	2	(0)
- * Club domestic league appearances and goals as of 13 November 2026 ‡ National team caps and goals as of 21 February 2024

Johannes Viitala (born 10 August 2006) is a Finnish professional football player who plays as a goalkeeper for Veikkausliiga side SJK.

== Club career ==
Viitala spent his youth years with Ilves academy. He debuted in Veikkausliiga with Ilves first team in October 2023, aged 17.

On 16 July 2024, he was loaned out to IFK Mariehamn.

== Honours ==
Ilves

- Finnish Cup: 2023
