= Roope Salo =

Finnish footballer (born 2004)

Personal information
- Full name: Roope Eemeli Salo
- Date of birth: 1 September 2004 (age 22)
- Place of birth: Jyväskylä, Finland
- Height: 1.82 m (6 ft 0 in)
- Position: Midfielder

Team information
- Current team: KuPS
- Number: 26

Youth career
- Muuramen Yritys
- 2012–2021: JJK

Senior career*
Years	Team	Apps	(Gls)
2020–2023	JJK	57	(3)
2024	AC Oulu	10	(0)
2024	→ OLS (loan)	9	(0)
2025–	KuPS	2	(0)
2025–	KuPS II	18	(1)
- * Club domestic league appearances and goals as of 19 November 2025

Roope Eemeli Salo (born 9 August 2004) is a Finnish professional footballer who plays as a midfielder for Veikkausliiga club KuPS.

== Career ==
=== JJK Jyväskylä ===
Salo started to play football in Muuramen Yritys, and joined the youth sector of JJK in Jyväskylä when he was eight years old. He debuted with the JJK first team, also known as the Kettupaidat, in the third-tier Kakkonen on 7 November 2020 against GBK Kokkola, at the age of 16. In the 2022 season, despite his young age, he became an integral part of the team and also helped the club to earn a promotion to the second-tier Ykkönen. Next season in Ykkönen, he played the most minutes for his team, excluding the goalkeepers.

His contract with JJK was extended on 8 July 2022, on a deal until the end of 2024.

=== AC Oulu ===
On 19 November 2023, AC Oulu in Veikkausliiga announced the signing of Salo on a two-year deal with an option for an additional year, for an undisclosed fee. He debuted with his new club on 27 January 2024, in a Finnish League Cup draw against Haka. One week later, he scored his first goal for AC Oulu, in a 2–0 League Cup win against SJK. His contract was terminated on 18 March 2025.

== Career statistics ==
As of 27 July 2025

Appearances and goals by club, season and competition
Club	Season	League			National cup (Note: Includes Suomen Cup)		League cup (Note: Includes Ykkönen Cup, Finnish League Cup and Ykkösliigacup)		Europe		Total	
Club	Season	Division	Apps	Goals	Apps	Goals	Apps	Goals	Apps	Goals	Apps	Goals
JJK Jyväskylä	2020	Kakkonen	1	0	0	0	—		—		1	0
JJK Jyväskylä	2021	Kakkonen	6	0	0	0	—		—		6	0
JJK Jyväskylä	2022	Kakkonen	24	3	2	1	—		—		26	4
JJK Jyväskylä	2023	Ykkönen	26	0	2	0	3	2	—		31	2
JJK Jyväskylä	Total		57	3	4	1	3	2	0	0	64	6
AC Oulu	2024	Veikkausliiga	10	0	2	0	5	1	—		17	1
OLS	2024	Ykkönen	9	0	0	0	—		—		9	0
SalPa	2025	Ykkösliiga	0	0	0	0	1	0	–		1	0
KuPS	2025	Veikkausliiga	2	0	2	0	0	0	0	0	4	0
KuPS Akatemia	2025	Ykkönen	10	1	–		–		–		10	1
Career total			87	4	8	1	9	3	0	0	104	8

== Honours ==
JJK Jyväskylä

- Kakkonen Group C: 2022
