= Fahad Mohamed =

Footballer (born 2000)

Personal information
- Full name: Fahad Fussad Mohamed
- Date of birth: 21 March 2000 (age 26)
- Place of birth: Mogadishu, Somalia
- Height: 1.84 m (6 ft 0 in)
- Position: Midfielder

Team information
- Current team: EIF
- Number: 29

Youth career
- Atlantis FC

Senior career*
Years	Team	Apps	(Gls)
2019	Atlantis II	16	(1)
2020–2021	Atlantis FC	24	(0)
2022	AB Argir	2	(0)
2022–2023	Olympias Lympion		
2023–2024	EIF II	1	(0)
2023–2024	EIF	28	(0)
2025	SalPa	17	(0)
2026–	EIF	23	(0)

International career^{‡}
2021–	Somalia	4	(0)
- * Club domestic league appearances and goals as of 1 November 2026 ‡ National team caps and goals as of 22 March 2025

Fahad Fussad Mohamed (born 21 March 2000) is a Somali professional footballer who plays as a midfielder for Finnish club EIF and the Somalia national team.

== Career ==
Mohamed started his career with Finnish side Atlantis FC. Before the 2022 season, he signed for AB in the Faroe Islands.

== Personal life ==
Mohamed was born in Mogadishu, Somalia on 21 march 2000.
