= Väinö Vehkonen =

Finnish footballer (born 2001)

Personal information
- Date of birth: 23 July 2001 (age 25)
- Place of birth: Finland
- Height: 1.90 m (6 ft 3 in)
- Position: Centre back

Team information
- Current team: Lahti
- Number: 6

Youth career
- –2018: JJK
- 2018–2020: HJK

Senior career*
Years	Team	Apps	(Gls)
2018	JJK	15	(0)
2019–2021	Klubi 04	36	(0)
2022–2023	MP	51	(8)
2024	EIF	22	(2)
2025	Inter Turku	3	(0)
2026–	Lahti	18	(0)

International career^{‡}
2019	Finland U18	1	(0)
- * Club domestic league appearances and goals as of 13 November 2026 ‡ National team caps and goals as of 4 December 2023

Väinö Vehkonen (born 23 July 2001) is a Finnish professional football defender for Veikkausliiga club Lahti.

== Career ==
Vehkonen started to play football in a youth sector of JJK Jyväskylä. He started his senior career in 2018 when JJK played in the second-tier Ykkönen, additionally making five appearances with JJK reserve team in the fourth-tier Kolmonen, scoring once. In January 2019, he transferred to HJK Helsinki organisation, and spent three seasons with the club's reserve team Klubi 04 in Kakkonen and Ykkönen.

Vehkonen represented Mikkelin Palloilijat (MP) in second-tier Ykkönen for two seasons, in 2022–2023.

In December 2023, Vehkonen signed with newly promoted Veikkausliiga club Ekenäs IF (EIF) for the 2024 season. He scored his first goal for EIF on 11 February 2024, in a Finnish League Cup loss against Inter Turku. Vehkonen scored his first goal in Veikkausliiga on 2 June 2024, in a 2–1 home loss against Vaasan Palloseura (VPS).

On 3 December 2024, Vehkonen signed with Veikkausliiga club Inter Turku.

== Career statistics ==
As of 13 November 2026.

Appearances and goals by club, season and competition
Club	Season	League			Cup (Note: Includes Suomen Cup)		League cup (Note: Includes Finnish League Cup and Ykköscup)		Europe		Total	
Club	Season	Division	Apps	Goals	Apps	Goals	Apps	Goals	Apps	Goals	Apps	Goals
JJK	2018	Ykkönen	15	0	–		–		–		15	0
JJK II	2018	Kolmonen	5	1	–		–		–		5	1
Klubi 04	2019	Kakkonen	10	0	1	0	–		–		11	0
Klubi 04	2020	Kakkonen	16	0	3	0	–		–		19	0
Klubi 04	2021	Ykkönen	10	0	–		–		–		10	0
Klubi 04	Total		36	0	4	0	0	0	0	0	40	0
MP	2022	Ykkönen	25	2	4	0	3	0	–		32	2
MP	2023	Ykkönen	26	5	2	0	3	0	–		31	5
MP	Total		51	7	6	0	6	0	0	0	63	7
Ekenäs IF	2024	Veikkausliiga	22	2	5	1	5	2	–		32	5
Inter Turku	2025	Veikkausliiga	3	0	2	0	5	0	–		10	0
Lahti	2026	Veikkausliiga	18	0	4	0	5	1	–		27	1
Career total			150	10	21	1	21	3	0	0	192	14

== Honours ==
Inter Turku

- Finnish League Cup: 2025

Klubi 04

- Kakkonen, Group B: 2020

Individual

- Ykkönen Player of the Month: May 2023
