= Toni Takamäki =

Finnish footballer (born 1992)

Personal information
- Full name: Toni Johannes Takamäki
- Date of birth: 15 January 1992 (age 34)
- Place of birth: Espoo, Finland
- Height: 1.87 m (6 ft 2 in)
- Position: Centre-back

Team information
- Current team: Honka

Youth career
- Espoo

Senior career*
Years	Team	Apps	(Gls)
2011–2012	Espoo	29	(1)
2013	Gnistan	21	(1)
2014	Viikingit	0	(0)
2015	Gnistan	11	(1)
2016–2017	GrIFK	47	(1)
2018–2020	Jaro	49	(3)
2021	Vaajakoski	4	(0)
2021	TB Tvøroyri	8	(1)
2022	Lysekloster IL	22	(2)
2023–2024	Gnistan	18	(0)
2025–	Honka	0	(0)
- * Club domestic league appearances and goals as of 27 September 2024

Toni Johannes Takamäki (born 15 January 1992) is a Finnish professional football player plays as a centre back for Honka.

== Club career ==
Takamäki has played for FC Espoo, Gnistan, Grankulla IFK and FF Jaro.

After starting the 2021 season with FC Vaajakoski, Takamäki transferred to TB Tvøroyri in Faroe Islands Premier League in the summer.

For the 2022 season, he joined Lysekloster IL in Norway, and after rejecting a contract extension, he returned to IF Gnistan in January 2023. Takamäki and Gnistan won a promotion to Veikkausliiga for the 2024 season. He missed most of the 2024 season due to surgery-requiring injury, but made his Veikkausliiga debut on 27 September in a home win against AC Oulu, when aged 32.

== Personal life ==
Takamäki was born in Espoo and raised in Suna neighborhood. After his parents separated when he was 15, he lived with a foster family.

== Career statistics ==
As of 23 October 2024.

Appearances and goals by club, season and competition
Club	Season	League			National cup (Note: Includes Suomen Cup and Norwegian Football Cup)		Other		Total	
Club	Season	Division	Apps	Goals	Apps	Goals	Apps	Goals	Apps	Goals
Espoo	2011	Ykkönen	16	0	–		–		16	0
Espoo	2012	Kakkonen	13	1	–		–		13	1
Espoo	Total		29	1	0	0	0	0	29	1
Gnistan	2013	Kakkonen	21	1	2	0	–		23	1
Viikingit	2014	Ykkönen	0	0	–		–		0	0
Gnistan	2015	Kakkonen	11	1	–		–		11	1
GrIFK	2016	Ykkönen	24	0	–		–		24	0
GrIFK	2017	Ykkönen	23	1	5	0	–		28	1
GrIFK	Total		47	1	5	0	0	0	52	1
Jaro	2018	Ykkönen	13	1	4	0	–		17	1
Jaro	2019	Ykkönen	21	0	–		–		21	0
Jaro	2020	Ykkönen	15	2	–		–		15	2
Jaro	Total		49	3	4	0	0	0	53	3
Vaajakoski	2021	Kakkonen	4	0	–		–		4	0
TB Tvøroyri	2021	Faroe Islands Premier League	8	1	–		–		8	1
Lysekloster IL	2022	3. divisjon	22	2	2	1	–		24	3
Gnistan	2023	Ykkönen	17	0	1	0	6	0	24	0
Gnistan	2024	Veikkausliiga	1	0	0	0	0	0	1	0
Gnistan	Total		18	0	1	0	6	0	25	0
Gnistan/Ogeli	2024	Kolmonen	2	0	–		–		2	0
Honka	2025	Kakkonen	0	0	–		–		0	0
Career total			211	10	14	1	6	0	231	11

== Honours ==
Gnistan

- Ykkönen runner-up: 2023
