= Emil Pallas =

Finnish footballer (born 2001)

Personal information
- Date of birth: 9 February 2001 (age 25)
- Place of birth: Helsinki, Finland
- Height: 1.80 m (5 ft 11 in)
- Position: Midfielder

Team information
- Current team: JäPS
- Number: 11

Youth career
- KäPa

Senior career*
| Years | Team | Apps | (Gls) |
| 2019 | KäPa | 1 | (0) |
| 2019 | HPS | 13 | (1) |
| 2020 | Espoo | 10 | (2) |
| 2021 | KäPa | 5 | (0) |
| 2022 | PPJ | 19 | (3) |
| 2023 | HIFK | 19 | (2) |
| 2024 | Ekenäs IF | 20 | (1) |
| 2025 | PK-35 | 14 | (0) |
| 2025– | JäPS | 26 | (6) |
- * Club domestic league appearances and goals as of 26 July 2026

Emil Pallas (born 9 February 2001) is a Finnish professional footballer who plays as a midfielder for Ykkösliiga club JäPS.

== Career ==
Pallas advanced through the youth program of a Helsinki-based Käpylän Pallo (KäPa). He made his senior debut with KäPa first team in third-tier Kakkonen in 2019.

After playing in Kakkonen with KäPa, HPS and PPJ for four seasons in total, Pallas signed with HIFK in second-tier Ykkönen for the 2023 season.

He joined a newly promoted Veikkausliiga club Ekenäs IF (EIF) in late December 2023. Pallas debuted in the league on 12 May 2024, in a 2–0 home loss against Ilves. He scored his first league goal on 30 June, in a 2–1 away win against Gnistan.

== Personal life ==
His twin brother Noah Pallas is also a professional footballer for Vålerenga and the Finland national team.
