= Alexander Forsström =

Finnish footballer (born 2000)

Personal information
- Date of birth: 23 September 2000 (age 26)
- Place of birth: Finland
- Height: 1.85 m (6 ft 1 in)
- Position: Centre back

Team information
- Current team: PK-35
- Number: 3

Youth career
- –2014: KOPSE
- 2015–2016: Legirus Inter
- 2017: PK-35
- 2018: HJK

Senior career*
Years	Team	Apps	(Gls)
2019	KäPa	18	(2)
2020	Espoo	16	(0)
2021–2022	EIF	24	(2)
2023–2024	AC Oulu	15	(0)
2023–2024	→ OLS	1	(0)
2025	EIF	24	(4)
2026–	PK-35	25	(0)
- * Club domestic league appearances and goals as of 18 October 2026

Alexander Forsström (born 23 September 2000) is a Finnish professional football centre back who plays for Ykkösliiga side PK-35.

== Honours ==
AC Oulu

- Finnish League Cup runner-up: 2023
