= Jaakko Moisio =

Finnish footballer (born 2005)

Personal information
- Full name: Jaakko Onni Moisio
- Date of birth: 12 February 2005 (age 21)
- Place of birth: Finland
- Position: Right back

Team information
- Current team: Ilves
- Number: 26

Youth career
- –2022: Ilves

Senior career*
| Years | Team | Apps | (Gls) |
| 2022–2025 | Ilves II | 77 | (3) |
| 2023– | Ilves | 12 | (0) |
- * Club domestic league appearances and goals as of 13 November 2026

Jaakko Onni Moisio (born 12 January 2005) is a Finnish footballer who plays as a right back for Ilves.

== Career statistics ==
As of 22 February 2025

Appearances and goals by club, season and competition
| Club | Season | League | | | Cup (Note: Includes Suomen Cup) | | League cup (Note: Includes Finnish League Cup) | | Europe | | Total | |
| Club | Season | Division | Apps | Goals | Apps | Goals | Apps | Goals | Apps | Goals | Apps | Goals |
|---|---|---|---|---|---|---|---|---|---|---|---|---|
| Ilves | 2022 | Kakkonen | 21 | 1 | 2 | 0 | – | | – | | 23 | 1 |
| Ilves | 2023 | Kakkonen | 20 | 1 | 1 | 0 | – | | – | | 22 | 1 |
| Ilves | 2024 | Kakkonen | 22 | 0 | 2 | 0 | – | | – | | 24 | 0 |
| Ilves | Total | | 63 | 2 | 5 | 0 | 0 | 0 | 0 | 0 | 68 | 2 |
| Ilves | 2023 | Veikkausliiga | 1 | 0 | 0 | 0 | 1 | 0 | – | | 2 | 0 |
| Ilves | 2024 | Veikkausliiga | 0 | 0 | 0 | 0 | 1 | 0 | 0 | 0 | 1 | 0 |
| Ilves | 2025 | Veikkausliiga | 0 | 0 | 0 | 0 | 5 | 0 | 0 | 0 | 5 | 0 |
| Ilves | Total | | 1 | 0 | 0 | 0 | 7 | 0 | 0 | 0 | 8 | 0 |
| Career total | | | 64 | 2 | 5 | 0 | 7 | 0 | 0 | 0 | 73 | 2 |
