= Artur Atarah =

Finnish footballer (born 2005)

Personal information
- Date of birth: 6 February 2005 (age 21)
- Place of birth: Finland
- Position: Centre forward

Team information
- Current team: Gnistan
- Number: 7

Youth career
- –2016: Viikingit
- 2017–2018: Käpylän Pallo
- 2019–2022: Honka

Senior career*
Years	Team	Apps	(Gls)
2023	Ekenäs IF	15	(5)
2023–2024	SJK II	32	(6)
2024	SJK	0	(0)
2025–	Gnistan	47	(3)
- * Club domestic league appearances and goals as of 13 November 2026

Artur Atarah (born 6 February 2005) is a Finnish professional footballer who plays as a forward for Veikkausliiga club Gnistan.

== Club career ==
After starting his senior career with Ekenäs IF in second-tier Ykkönen, Atarah signed a professional contract with SJK organisation on 7 August 2023.

He left SJK in March 2025 and signed with Veikkausliiga club IF Gnistan.

== Personal life ==
Atarah was born in Finland to a Ghanaian father and a Finnish mother.
