= Otto Lehtisalo =

Finnish footballer (born 2004)

Personal information
- Date of birth: 30 July 2004 (age 22)
- Place of birth: Finland
- Height: 1.80 m (5 ft 11 in)
- Position: Forward

Team information
- Current team: SalPa
- Number: 9

Youth career
- –2021: Inter Turku

Senior career*
Years	Team	Apps	(Gls)
2021–2024	Inter Turku II	26	(22)
2022–2024	Inter Turku	12	(1)
2022–2024	→ SalPa (loan)	32	(3)
2025–	SalPa	27	(5)

International career^{‡}
2022	Finland U18	4	(1)
2022	Finland U19	6	(0)
- * Club domestic league appearances and goals as of 24 November 2025 ‡ National team caps and goals as of 18 February 2024

Otto Lehtisalo (born 30 July 2004) is a Finnish professional footballer who plays as a forward for Ykkösliiga club SalPa.

== Career statistics ==
As of 7 August 2025

Appearances and goals by club, season and competition
Club	Season	League			Cup (Note: Includes Suomen Cup)		League cup		Europe		Total	
Club	Season	Division	Apps	Goals	Apps	Goals	Apps	Goals	Apps	Goals	Apps	Goals
Inter Turku II	2021	Kolmonen	1	0	–		–		–		1	0
Inter Turku II	2022	Kolmonen	6	2	–		–		–		6	2
Inter Turku II	2023	Kolmonen	10	14	–		–		–		10	14
Inter Turku II	2024	Kakkonen	9	6	–		–		–		9	6
Inter Turku II	Total		26	22	0	0	0	0	0	0	26	22
Inter Turku	2022	Veikkausliiga	5	0	1	3	4	0	0	0	10	3
Inter Turku	2023	Veikkausliiga	6	1	2	1	6	0	–		14	2
Inter Turku	2024	Veikkausliiga	1	0	2	2	3	0	–		6	2
Inter Turku	Total		12	1	5	6	11	0	0	0	28	7
SalPa (loan)	2022	Kakkonen	10	2	–		–		–		10	2
SalPa (loan)	2023	Ykkönen	8	0	–		–		–		8	0
SalPa (loan)	2024	Ykkösliiga	14	1	–		–		–		14	1
SalPa (loan)	Total		32	3	0	0	0	0	0	0	32	3
SalPa	2025	Ykkösliiga	18	2	1	0	4	3	–		23	5
Career total			88	28	6	6	15	3	0	0	109	37
