= Usman Suleman =

Ghanaian footballer (born 2002)

Personal information
- Full name: Hussein Usman Suleman
- Date of birth: 11 June 2002 (age 24)
- Place of birth: Ghana
- Height: 1.73 m (5 ft 8 in)
- Position: Midfielder

Team information
- Current team: Jazz

Youth career
- Nkoranza Warriors SC

Senior career*
Years	Team	Apps	(Gls)
2023	Åland	5	(1)
2023–2024	IFK Mariehamn	10	(0)
2024	IFK Mariehamn II	11	(0)
2025–	Jazz	0	(0)
- * Club domestic league appearances and goals as of 10 January 2025

Hussein Usman Suleman (born 11 June 2002) is a Ghanaian professional footballer plays as a midfielder for Ykkönen club Jazz.
