= Miska Rautiola =

Finnish footballer (born 1998)

Personal information
- Date of birth: 20 June 1998 (age 28)
- Place of birth: Finland
- Height: 1.89 m (6 ft 2 in)
- Position: Centre back

Team information
- Current team: SalPa
- Number: 6

Youth career
- –2016: Ilves

Senior career*
Years	Team	Apps	(Gls)
2016–2020	Ilves II	62	(19)
2020–2021	Ilves	22	(0)
2022	Doxa Dramas		
2022	NSÍ Runavík	8	(1)
2023	KTP	4	(0)
2023	→ PEPO (loan)	5	(0)
2024	JäPS	10	(1)
2025–	SalPa	26	(1)
- * Club domestic league appearances and goals as of 24 November 2025

Miska Rautiola (born 20 June 1998) is a Finnish professional footballer who plays as a centre back for Ykkösliiga club SalPa.

== Career statistics ==
As of 23 October 2024.

Appearances and goals by club, season and competition
Club	Season	League			Cup (Note: Includes Suomen Cup)		League cup (Note: Includes Finnish League Cup and Ykkösliigacup)		Total	
Club	Season	Division	Apps	Goals	Apps	Goals	Apps	Goals	Apps	Goals
Ilves II	2016	Kolmonen	16	3	1	0	–		17	3
Ilves II	2017	Kolmonen	14	3	–		–		14	3
Ilves II	2018	Kolmonen	12	5	–		–		12	5
Ilves II	2019	Kakkonen	12	3	1	0	–		13	3
Ilves II	2020	Kakkonen	8	5	3	2	–		11	7
Ilves II	Total		62	19	5	2	0	0	67	21
Ilves	2020	Veikkausliiga	10	0	–		–		10	0
Ilves	2021	Veikkausliiga	12	0	2	0	–		14	0
Ilves	Total		22	0	2	0	0	0	24	0
Doxa Dramas	2021–22	Gamma Ethniki					–			
NSÍ Runavík	2022	Faroe Islands Premier League	8	1	–		–		8	1
KTP	2023	Veikkausliiga	4	0	5	0	0	0	9	0
PEPO (loan)	2023	Kakkonen	5	0	–		–		5	0
JäPS	2024	Ykkösliiga	10	1	0	0	1	0	11	1
SalPa	2025	Ykkösliiga	0	0	0	0	0	0	0	0
Career total			111	21	12	2	1	0	124	23
