= Vinícius Ribeiro =

Brazilian footballer (born 2001)

Personal information
- Full name: Vinícius dos Santos Ribeiro
- Date of birth: 24 July 2001 (age 25)
- Place of birth: Campinas, Brazil
- Height: 1.75 m (5 ft 9 in)
- Position: Winger

Youth career
- Bragantino

Senior career*
Years	Team	Apps	(Gls)
2019–2021	Grêmio Osasco	5	(0)
2020–2021	→ Caldense (loan)	6	(0)
2021–2022	Caldense	7	(0)
2021–2022	→ Coritiba (loan)	6	(0)
2023–2024	SJK II	14	(0)
2023	→ Džiugas (loan)	36	(5)
- * Club domestic league appearances and goals as of 8 October 2024

Vinícius dos Santos Ribeiro (born 24 July 2001) is a Brazilian professional footballer who most recently played as a winger for Ykkösliiga club SJK II.

== Youth career ==
Vinícius Ribeiro started football in the youth sector of Red Bull Bragantino.

== Club career ==
In his native Brazil, he played for Grêmio Osasco, Caldense and Coritiba. Besides the state leagues, he also made appearances in Brazilian Série B and Série D.

In March 2023, Vinícius Ribeiro signed with Finnish Seinäjoen Jalkapallokerho (SJK) organisation, and was immediately thereafter loaned out to Lithuanian A Lyga club Džiugas for the 2023 season.

After the 2023 season, he returned to Finland and joined the SJK's academy team SJK Akatemia, competing in the new second-tier Ykkösliiga.

== Career statistics ==
As of 8 October 2024.

Appearances and goals by club, season and competition
Club	Season	League			State league		Cup (Note: Includes Suomen Cup and Lithuanian Cup)		League cup		Continental		Total	
Club	Season	Division	Apps	Goals	Apps	Goals	Apps	Goals	Apps	Goals	Apps	Goals	Apps	Goals
Grêmio Osasco	2019	Campeonato Paulista A3	–		1 (Note: Includes Campeonato Paulista Série A3)	0	–		10 (Note: Includes Copa Paulista)	0	–		11	0
Grêmio Osasco	2020	Campeonato Paulista A3	–		4	0	–		–		–		4	0
Grêmio Osasco	Total		–	–	5	0	–	–	10	0	–	–	15	0
Caldense (loan)	2020	Série D	4	0	2 (Note: Includes Campeonato Mineiro)	0	–		–		–		6	0
Caldense	2021	Série D	0	0	5	0	–		–		–		5	0
Caldense	2022	Série D	2	0	–		–		–		–		2	0
Caldense	Total		2	0	5	0	–	–	–	–	–	–	7	0
Coritiba (loan)	2021	Série B	1	0	–		–		–		–		1	0
Coritiba (loan)	2022	Série A	0	0	5 (Note: Includes Campeonato Paranaense)	0	–		–		–		5	0
Coritiba (loan)	Total		1	0	5	0	–	–	–	–	–	–	6	0
SJK Akatemia	2023	Ykkönen	0	0	–		0	0	0	0	–		0	0
SJK Akatemia	2024	Ykkösliiga	14	0	–		3	0	6 (Note: Includes Ykkösliigacup)	3	–		23	3
SJK Akatemia	Total		14	0	–	–	3	0	6	3	–	–	23	3
Džiugas (loan)	2023	A Lyga	36	5	–		2	0	–		–		38	5
Career total			57	5	17	0	5	0	16	3	0	0	95	8
