= Santeri Pohjolainen =

Finnish footballer (born 2002)

Personal information
- Date of birth: 5 August 2002 (age 24)
- Place of birth: Finland
- Height: 1.74 m (5 ft 9 in)
- Position: Midfielder

Team information
- Current team: TPS

Youth career
- –2020: TPS

Senior career*
Years	Team	Apps	(Gls)
2020–2022	TPS II	21	(2)
2020–2023	TPS	26	(0)
2024	JäPS	0	(0)
2025–	TPS	0	(0)

International career
- Finland U18
- Finland U19
- * Club domestic league appearances and goals as of 11 March 2024

Santeri Pohjolainen (born 5 May 2002) is a Finnish professional footballer who plays as a midfielder for Ykkösliiga club TPS.

== Club career ==
Pohjolainen debuted in Veikkausliiga with Turun Palloseura (TPS) in the 2020 season.

He signed with Ykkösliiga club JäPS for the 2024 season.

== Honours ==
TPS

- Ykkönen runner-up: 2022
