= Valentin Purosalo =

Finnish footballer (born 2005)

Personal information
- Date of birth: 10 September 2005 (age 21)
- Place of birth: Turku, Finland
- Height: 1.83 m (6 ft 0 in)
- Position: Right-back

Team information
- Current team: Haka
- Number: 30

Youth career
- –2018: TuNL
- 2018–2022: Inter Turku

Senior career*
Years	Team	Apps	(Gls)
2021–2024	Inter Turku II	41	(4)
2022–2024	Inter Turku	18	(1)
2025–	Haka	49	(1)

International career^{‡}
2019	Finland U15	3	(0)
2022	Finland U17	2	(0)
2023	Finland U18	2	(0)
2023	Finland U19	3	(0)
- * Club domestic league appearances and goals as of 1 November 2026 ‡ National team caps and goals as of 17 October 2023

Valentin Purosalo (born 10 September 2005) is a Finnish professional footballer who plays as a right-back for Ykkösliiga club Haka.

== Career ==
Born in Turku, Purosalo grew up near Veritas Stadion, the home stadium of Inter Turku, and started playing football in Turun Nappulaliiga youth sector. He joined Inter Turku in 2018.

He made his Veikkausliiga debut with Inter Turku first team on 8 July 2023, in a 2–2 away draw against Haka, scoring his first league goal in the match.

On 19 November 2024, Purosalo joined Haka on a two-year deal with a one-year option.

== International career ==
In October 2023, Purosalo was part of the Finland U19 squad in the 2024 UEFA European Under-19 Championship qualification tournament, playing in three games against Romania, Czech Republic and San Marino.

== Career statistics ==
As of 20 May 2025

Appearances and goals by club, season and competition
Club	Season	League			National cup		League cup		Europe		Total	
Club	Season	Division	Apps	Goals	Apps	Goals	Apps	Goals	Apps	Goals	Apps	Goals
Inter Turku II	2021	Kolmonen	1	0	–		–		–		1	0
Inter Turku II	2022	Kolmonen	11	0	1	0	–		–		12	0
Inter Turku II	2023	Kolmonen	13	2	0	0	–		–		13	2
Inter Turku II	2024	Kakkonen	16	2	–		–		–		16	2
Inter Turku II	Total		41	4	1	0	0	0	0	0	42	4
Inter Turku	2022	Veikkausliiga	0	0	0	0	1	0	0	0	1	0
Inter Turku	2023	Veikkausliiga	9	1	2	0	4	0	–		15	1
Inter Turku	2024	Veikkausliiga	9	0	3	0	6	0	–		18	0
Inter Turku	Total		18	1	5	0	11	0	0	0	34	1
Haka	2025	Veikkausliiga	6	0	2	1	5	0	–		13	1
Career total			65	5	8	1	16	0	0	0	89	6

== Honours ==
Inter Turku

- Finnish League Cup: 2024
- Finnish League Cup runner-up: 2022
