= Jean-Claude Mabinda =

Finnish footballer (born 2000)

Jean Mabinda
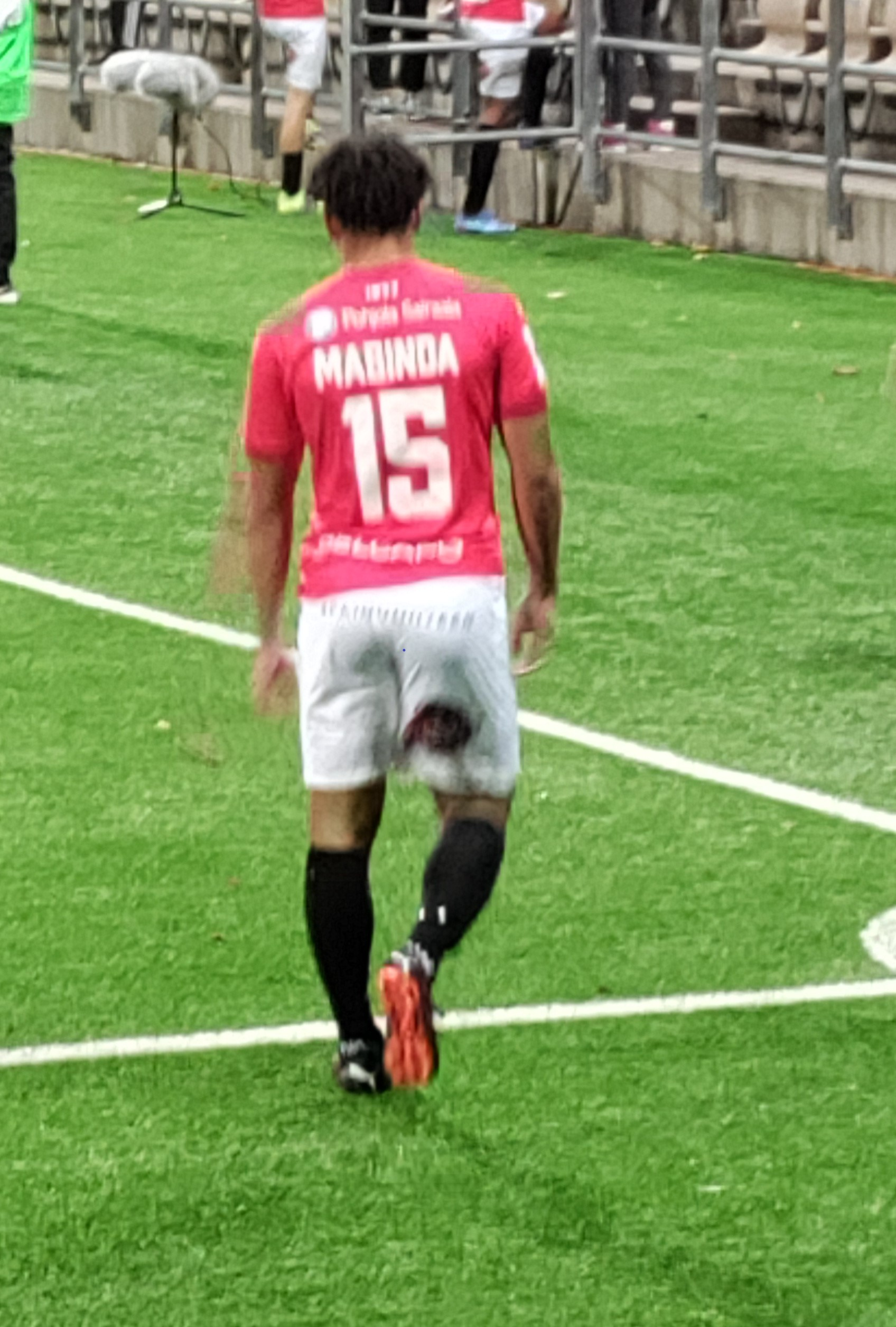
- Mabinda with HIFK in 2021

Personal information
- Full name: Jean-Claude Anicet Mabinda-Kinzumba
- Date of birth: 22 May 2000 (age 26)
- Place of birth: Helsinki, Finland
- Height: 1.69 m (5 ft 7 in)
- Position: Right-back

Team information
- Current team: JäPS
- Number: 30

Youth career
- HIFK
- 2016–2018: HJK

Senior career*
Years	Team	Apps	(Gls)
2018–2019	Klubi 04	33	(0)
2020	Jaro	21	(0)
2020	→ JBK	1	(0)
2021	HIFK	9	(0)
2022–2024	Gnistan	54	(1)
2024	→ PKKU (loan)	2	(0)
2024	→ JäPS (loan)	6	(0)
2025–	JäPS	3	(0)

International career
2018	Finland U18	4	(0)
- * Club domestic league appearances and goals as of 19 October 2024

Jean-Claude Mabinda (born 22 May 2000) is a Finnish professional football player who plays as a right-back for Ykkösliiga club JäPS. Born in Finland, Mabinda also has a Congolese citizenship.

== Early life ==
Mabinda was born in Helsinki, Finland, to a Finnish mother and a Congolese (DRC) father.

== Career ==
Mabinda started in the youth sector of HIFK, before joining HJK Helsinki in 2016. He made a senior debut in 2018 for the club's reserve team Klubi 04 in the second tier, Ykkönen. He spent the 2020 season with FF Jaro in Ykkönen, and made his Veikkausliiga debut with his former club HIFK in 2021.

Since 2022, Mabinda played for IF Gnistan in Ykkönen. They went on to win the promotion to Veikkausliiga in the 2023 season, after finishing the season's runners-up. In December 2023, Gnistan announced the extension of Mabinda's contract for the 2024 season. On 27 August 2024, he was loaned out to Ykkösliiga club Järvenpään Palloseura (JäPS) for the rest of the season. He was named the Ykkösliiga Player of the Month in September 2024. On 1 April 2025, he signed with JäPS on permanent basis.

== Career statistics ==
As of 1 April 2025

Appearances and goals by club, season and competition
Club	Season	League			National cup (Note: Includes Suomen Cup)		League cup (Note: Includes Ykköscup, Finnish League Cup and Ykkösliigacup)		Total	
Club	Season	Division	Apps	Goals	Apps	Goals	Apps	Goals	Apps	Goals
Klubi 04	2018	Ykkönen	11	0	3	0	–		14	0
Klubi 04	2019	Kakkonen	22	0	2	0	–		24	0
Klubi 04	Total		33	0	5	0	0	0	38	0
Jaro	2020	Ykkönen	21	0	5	0	–		26	0
Jakobstads BK	2020	Kakkonen	1	0	–		–		1	0
HIFK	2021	Veikkausliiga	9	0	1	0	–		10	0
Gnistan	2022	Ykkönen	23	1	2	0	3	0	28	1
Gnistan	2023	Ykkönen	29	0	3	0	6	0	38	0
Gnistan	2024	Veikkausliiga	2	0	2	0	1	0	5	0
Gnistan	Total		54	1	7	0	10	0	71	1
PK Keski-Uusimaa (loan)	2024	Ykkönen	2	0	–		–		2	0
JäPS (loan)	2024	Ykkösliiga	6	0	–		–		6	0
JäPS	2025	Ykkösliiga	0	0	0	0	0	0	0	0
Career total			126	1	18	0	10	0	154	1

== Honours ==
Gnistan

- Ykkönen runner-up: 2023

Individual

- Ykkösliiga Player of the Month: September 2024
