= Joonas Lakkamäki =

Finnish footballer (born 2002)

Personal information
- Date of birth: 25 January 2002 (age 24)
- Place of birth: Nakkila, Finland
- Height: 1.87 m (6 ft 2 in)
- Position: Defender

Team information
- Current team: Jazz
- Number: 5

Youth career
- –2017: Jazz
- 2018: MuSa

Senior career*
Years	Team	Apps	(Gls)
2018–2021	MuSa	66	(2)
2019	→ Pallo-Iirot (loan)	2	(0)
2022–2024	TPS	68	(6)
2025–2026	VPS	6	(0)
2025	→ Jazz (loan)	14	(0)
2026–	Jazz	25	(9)

International career^{‡}
2019	Finland U18	2	(0)
2021	Finland U20	1	(0)
- * Club domestic league appearances and goals as of 7 November 2026 ‡ National team caps and goals as of 4 March 2024

Joonas Lakkamäki (born 25 January 2002) is a Finnish professional footballer who plays as a defender for Jazz in the Finnish third-tier league Ykkönen.

== Club career ==
Lakkamäki started his career in Pori with FC Jazz and Musan Salama. He made his senior debut with MuSa's first team in 2018, aged 16, in the third tier Kakkonen.

During 2022–2024, he played for Turun Palloseura (TPS) in Finnish second tier.

In January 2025, Lakkamäki signed with Veikkausliiga club Vaasan Palloseura (VPS).

== Personal life ==
Lakkamäki's brother, Jaakko, is also a footballer and referee. He plays as a goalkeeper for MuSa.

== Career statistics ==
As of 1 July 2025

Appearances and goals by club, season and competition
Club	Season	League			National cup (Note: Includes Suomen Cup)		League cup (Note: Includes Ykköscup, Ykkösliigacup and Finnish League Cup)		Europe		Total	
Club	Season	Division	Apps	Goals	Apps	Goals	Apps	Goals	Apps	Goals	Apps	Goals
Musan Salama	2018	Kakkonen	8	0	–		–		–		8	0
Musan Salama	2019	Ykkönen	18	0	4	0	–		–		22	0
Musan Salama	2020	Ykkönen	13	0	5	0	–		–		18	0
Musan Salama	2021	Ykkönen	27	2	3	1	–		–		30	3
Musan Salama	Total		66	2	12	1	0	0	0	0	78	3
Pallo-Iirot (loan)	2019	Kakkonen	2	0	–		–		–		2	0
TPS	2022	Ykkönen	25	1	2	0	4	0	–		31	1
TPS	2023	Ykkönen	20	3	0	0	3	0	–		23	3
TPS	2024	Ykkösliiga	23	2	3	1	3	0	–		29	3
TPS	Total		68	6	5	1	10	0	0	0	83	7
TPS U23	2022	Kolmonen	1	0	–		–		–		1	0
VPS	2025	Veikkausliiga	6	0	4	1	2	0	–		12	1
Jazz (loan)	2025	Ykkönen	1	0	–		–		–		1	0
Career total			143	8	21	3	12	0	0	0	176	11
