= Ardy Mfundu =

Belgium footballer (born 2003)

Personal information
- Date of birth: 9 April 2003 (age 23)
- Place of birth: Almere, Netherlands
- Height: 1.85 m (6 ft 1 in)
- Position: Centre back

Team information
- Current team: KPV (on loan from IFK Mariehamn)

Youth career
- –2018: KV Mechelen
- 2018–2019: Club Brugge
- 2019–2022: Schalke 04

Senior career*
Years	Team	Apps	(Gls)
2022–2023	Schalke 04 II	12	(0)
2024	Beerschot U23	7	(1)
2025–	IFK Mariehamn	0	(0)
2025–	→ KPV (loan)	0	(0)

International career
2018	Belgium U16	11	(2)
2020	Belgium U17	1	(0)
- * Club domestic league appearances and goals as of 31 January 2025

Ardy Mfundu (born 9 April 2003) is a Belgian professional footballer who plays as a centre back for Finnish club KPV, on loan from IFK Mariehamn.

== Club career ==
Mfundu played in the youth academies of KV Mechelen, Club Brugge and Schalke 04.

In 2020, Mfundu was named in the Next Generation list of top 60 young talent in world football by The Guardian.

He made his senior debut with Schalke's reserve team in the 2022–23 season.

After a season with Beerschot, in January 2025 Mfundu joined with IFK Mariehamn in Finnish Veikkausliiga.

== Career statistics ==
As of 27 February 2025

Appearances and goals by club, season and competition
Club	Season	League			Cup (Note: Includes Suomen Cup)		League cup (Note: Includes Finnish League Cup)		Total	
Club	Season	Division	Apps	Goals	Apps	Goals	Apps	Goals	Apps	Goals
Schalke 04 II	2022–23	Regionalliga West	12	0	–		–		12	0
Beerschot U23	2023–24	Belgian Division 3	7	1	–		–		7	1
IFK Mariehamn	2025	Veikkausliiga	0	0	0	0	4	0	4	0
KPV (loan)	2025	Ykkönen	0	0	0	0	–		0	0
Career total			19	1	0	0	4	0	23	1
