= Noel Hasa =

Finnish footballer (born 2003)

Personal information
- Full name: Noel Hasa
- Date of birth: 6 February 2003 (age 23)
- Place of birth: Finland
- Height: 1.80 m (5 ft 11 in)
- Position: Midfielder

Team information
- Current team: Tampere United
- Number: 6

Youth career
- TPV
- –2021: Ilves

Senior career*
Years	Team	Apps	(Gls)
2020–2025	Ilves II	53	(8)
2021–2025	Ilves	28	(0)
2025	→ Lahti (loan)	26	(3)
2026–	Tampere United	23	(3)
Medal record
Ilves
First place	Finnish Cup	2023
- * Club domestic league appearances and goals as of 7 November 2026

Noel Hasa (born 6 February 2003) is a Finnish professional football player who plays as a midfielder for Ykkönen side Tampere United.

== Club career ==
Hasa is a product of the Ilves youth academy.

On 31 October 2023, Ilves announced that they had signed a new contract with Hasa on a deal until the end of 2025, with an option for an additional year.

On 2 April 2025, Hasa was loaned to Lahti in Ykkösliiga.

== Honours ==
Ilves

- Finnish Cup: 2023
