= Imani Lanquedoc =

English footballer (born 2003)

Personal information
- Full name: Imani Jamal Lanquedoc
- Date of birth: 15 November 2003 (age 22)
- Place of birth: England
- Height: 1.69 m (5 ft 7 in)
- Positions: Attacking midfielder; winger

Youth career
- 2015–2022: Fulham

Senior career*
Years	Team	Apps	(Gls)
2022–2025	Fulham	0	(0)
2022	→ Basingstoke Town (loan)	0	(0)
2024	→ Haka (loan)	25	(5)
2025	Eastbourne Borough	5	(0)
2026	Haka	15	(5)
- * Club domestic league appearances and goals as of 1 August 2026

Imani Jamal Lanquedoc (born 15 November 2003) is an English professional footballer who plays as a winger.

== Club career ==
=== Fulham ===
On 2 September 2022, Lanquedoc was loaned out to Basingstoke Town. He suffered a knee injury almost immediately after his arrival. This led him to be out of action for an entire year.

In March 2024, he was loaned out to Veikkausliiga club Haka in Finland.

In July 2025, it was announced that Lanquedoc had departed Fulham

=== Later career ===
On 21 August 2025, Lanquedoc signed for National League South club Eastbourne Borough.

In January 2026, Lanquedoc returned to Ykkösliiga club Haka on a one-year deal with the option for a further season. On 29 July 2026, the club announced that they had not exercised the extension option in his contract and he had subsequently departed the club.

== Career statistics ==
As of 26 July 2026.

Appearances and goals by club, season and competition
Club	Season	League			National cup (Note: Includes Suomen Cup)		League cup		Total	
Club	Season	Division	Apps	Goals	Apps	Goals	Apps	Goals	Apps	Goals
Basingstoke Town (loan)	2022–23	Isthmian League								
Haka (loan)	2024	Veikkausliiga	25	5	5	3	0	0	30	8
Eastbourne Borough	2025–26	National League South	5	0	1	0	0	0	6	0
Haka	2026	Ykkösliiga	15	5	2	0	0	0	17	5
Career total			45	10	8	3	0	0	53	13
