= Tuomas Koivisto =

Finnish footballer (born 2004)

Personal information
- Full name: Tuomas Aarne Armas Koivisto
- Date of birth: 7 January 2004 (age 22)
- Place of birth: Finland
- Position: Centre back

Team information
- Current team: IFK Mariehamn
- Number: 5

Youth career
- Säynätsalon Riento
- –2021: JJK

Senior career*
Years	Team	Apps	(Gls)
2021	JJK	13	(0)
2022–2025	SJK II	74	(1)
2024–2025	SJK	5	(0)
2026–	IFK Mariehamn	21	(0)

International career^{‡}
2021–2022	Finland U18	4	(0)
- * Club domestic league appearances and goals as of 13 November 2026 ‡ National team caps and goals as of 8 July 2024

Tuomas Aarne Armas Koivisto (born 7 January 2004) is a Finnish professional footballer who plays as a centre back for IFK Mariehamn.
