= Ibrahim Cissé (footballer, born 2003) =

Ivorian footballer (born 2003)

Personal information
- Date of birth: 6 December 2003 (age 22)
- Place of birth: Ivory Coast
- Position: Centre back

Team information
- Current team: Džiugas

Senior career*
Years	Team	Apps	(Gls)
2022–2023	Zoman		
2022	→ Lillestrøm (loan)	0	(0)
2022	→ Lillestrøm 2 (loan)	3	(0)
2023–2024	SJK	4	(0)
2023–2024	SJK II	18	(0)
2024	→ Džiugas (loan)	11	(1)
2025–	Džiugas	51	(7)

International career^{‡}
- Ivory Coast U20
- * Club domestic league appearances and goals as of 20 July 2026 ‡ National team caps and goals as of 18 February 2024

Ibrahim Cissé (born 6 December 2003) is an Ivorian professional footballer, playing as a defender for A Lyga club Džiugas.

== Club career ==
In 2022, he was loaned out Norwegian club Lillestrøm.

On 4 August 2023, Cissé signed with Finnish Veikkausliiga club SJK. He made four appearances in the league for the first team, but featured mostly for the reserve team SJK Akatemia in the second-tier Ykkösliiga.

On 23 July 2024, Cissé was loaned out to Džiugas in Lithuanian A Lyga for the rest of the season. After the season, he signed a permanent contract with the club.

== Career statistics ==
As of 11 November 2024

Appearances and goals by club, season and competition
Club	Season	League			Cup (Note: Includes Suomen Cup and Lithuanian Cup)		League cup (Note: Includes Finnish League Cup and Ykkösliigacup)		Europe		Total	
Club	Season	Division	Apps	Goals	Apps	Goals	Apps	Goals	Apps	Goals	Apps	Goals
Lillestrøm (loan)	2022	Eliteserien	0	0	0	0	–		0	0	0	0
Lillestrøm 2 (loan)	2022	3. divisjon	3	0	–		–		–		3	0
SJK	2023	Veikkausliiga	4	0	–		–		–		4	0
SJK	2024	Veikkausliiga	0	0	0	0	3	0	–		3	0
SJK	Total		4	0	0	0	3	0	0	0	7	0
SJK Akatemia	2023	Ykkönen	6	0	–		–		–		6	0
SJK Akatemia	2024	Ykkösliiga	12	0	3	0	5	0	–		20	0
SJK Akatemia	Total		18	0	3	0	5	0	0	0	26	0
Džiugas (loan)	2024	A Lyga	11	1	2	0	–		–		13	1
Džiugas	2025	A Lyga	0	0	0	0	–		–		0	0
Career total			36	1	13	0	8	0	0	0	57	1
