= Jiri Koski =

Finnish footballer (born 1995)

Personal information
- Date of birth: 20 May 1995 (age 31)
- Place of birth: Helsinki, Finland
- Height: 1.88 m (6 ft 2 in)
- Position: Goalkeeper

Team information
- Current team: KTP
- Number: 1

Youth career
- FC Vaajakoski
- JJK

Senior career*
Years	Team	Apps	(Gls)
2012	JJK	0	(0)
2012	Warkaus JK	2	(0)
2013	PK-35 Vantaa	0	(0)
2013	Klubi 04	0	(0)
2013–2014	Vejle	0	(0)
2014–2015	Atlantis	14	(0)
2016	Klubi 04	8	(0)
2016	HJK	1	(0)
2017–2019	KTP	74	(0)
2020	EIF	7	(0)
2021–2024	Gnistan	66	(0)
2025–	KTP	5	(0)

International career^{‡}
2011	Finland U17	2	(0)
- Finland U18
- * Club domestic league appearances and goals as of 28 July 2025 ‡ National team caps and goals as of 4 March 2024

Jiri Koski (born 20 May 1995) is a Finnish professional football player who plays as a goalkeeper for Veikkausliiga side KTP.

== Club career ==
Koski debuted in Veikkausliiga with HJK Helsinki on 17 October 2016, in a 3–1 win against Ilves.

Since 2021, Koski has played for IF Gnistan in second-tier Ykkönen, and was the team captain in the 2023 season. On 19 May 2024, he made his first Gnistan appearance in the highest level, and only his second-ever appearance in Veikkausliiga, keeping a clean sheet in a 0–0 draw against Kuopion Palloseura (KuPS).

Koski returned to KTP for the 2025 Veikkausliiga season.

== Career statistics ==
As of 8 May 2025

Appearances and goals by club, season and competition
Club	Season	League			National cup		League cup (Note: Includes Finnish League Cup and Ykköscup)		Total	
Club	Season	Division	Apps	Goals	Apps	Goals	Apps	Goals	Apps	Goals
JJK Jyväskylä	2012	Veikkausliiga	0	0	0	0	0	0	0	0
Warkaus JK (loan)	2012	Kakkonen	2	0	–		–		2	0
PK-35 Vantaa	2013	Ykkönen	0	0	1	0	–		1	0
Vejle	2013–14	Danish 1st Division	0	0	0	0	–		0	0
Atlantis	2014	Kakkonen	24	0	0	0	–		24	0
Atlantis	2015	Kakkonen	9	0	2	0	–		11	0
Atlantis	Total		33	0	2	0	0	0	35	0
Atlantis Akatemia	2015	Nelonen	3	0	–		–		3	0
HJK Helsinki	2016	Veikkausliiga	1	0	0	0	0	0	1	0
Klubi 04	2016	Kakkonen	8	0	2	0	–		10	0
KTP	2017	Kakkonen	24	0	5	0	–		29	0
KTP	2018	Ykkönen	25	0	2	0	–		27	0
KTP	2019	Ykkönen	27	0	4	0	–		31	0
KTP	Total		76	0	11	0	0	0	87	0
Ekenäs IF	2020	Ykkönen	7	0	0	0	–		7	0
Gnistan	2021	Ykkönen	8	0	5	0	–		13	0
Gnistan	2022	Ykkönen	24	0	1	0	0	0	25	0
Gnistan	2023	Ykkönen	26	0	0	0	5	0	31	0
Gnistan	2024	Veikkausliiga	8	0	2	0	4	0	14	0
Gnistan	Total		66	0	8	0	9	0	83	0
KTP	2025	Veikkausliiga	5	0	0	0	2	0	7	0
Career total			201	0	24	0	11	0	236	0

== Honours ==
Gnistan

- Ykkönen runner-up: 2023

HJK

- Veikkausliiga runner-up: 2016

Individual

- Ykkönen Player of the Month: April 2023
- Kakkonen, Group A: Goalkeeper of the Year 2017
