= Lauri Vetri =

Finnish footballer (born 2003)

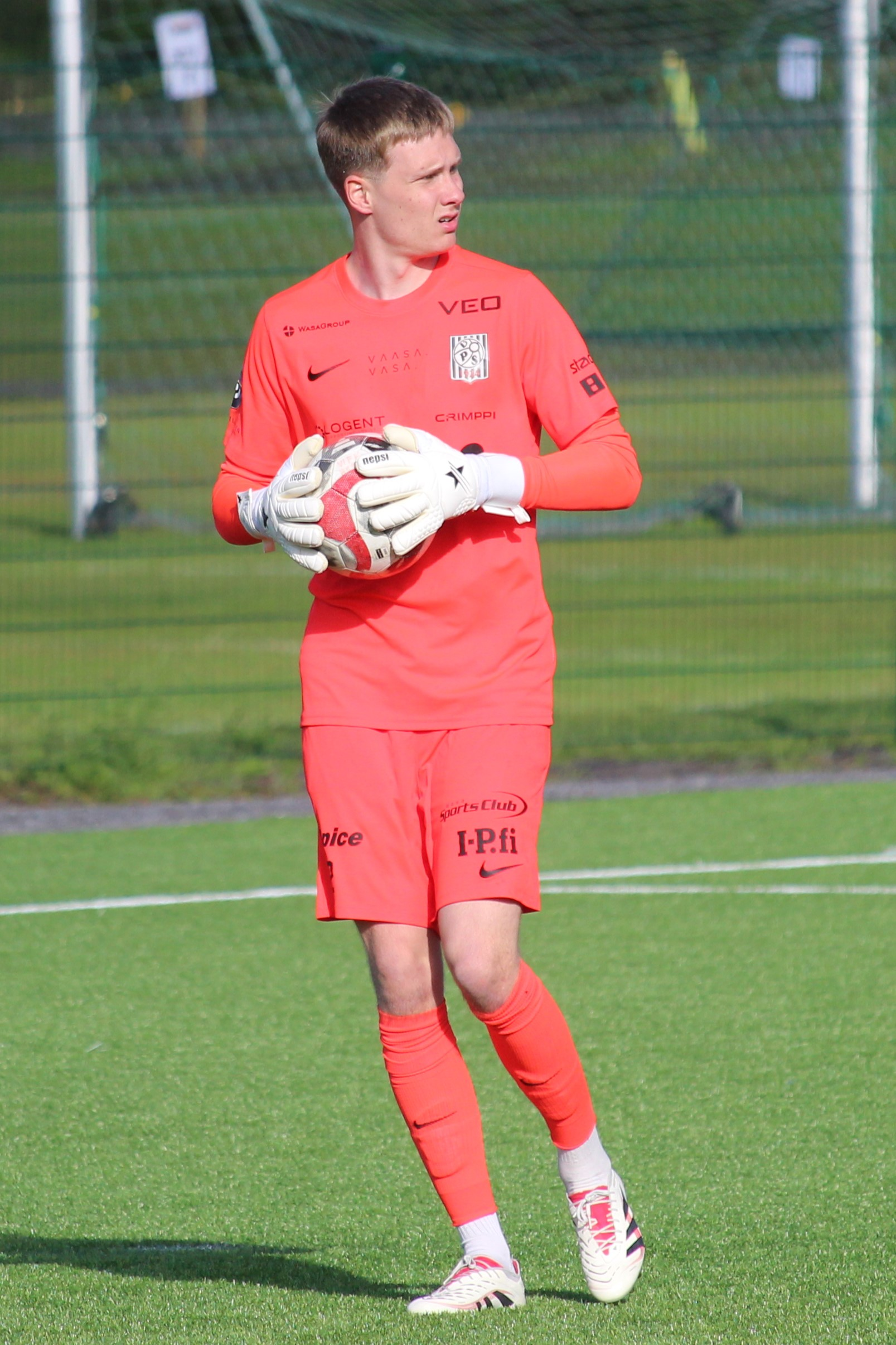
- Vetri in 2025

Personal information
- Full name: Lauri-Eemil Tapani Vetri
- Date of birth: 6 March 2003 (age 23)
- Place of birth: Finland
- Height: 1.89 m (6 ft 2 in)
- Position: Goalkeeper

Team information
- Current team: VPS
- Number: 12

Youth career
- –2017: RoPS
- 2017: TP-47
- 2017–2019: RoPS

Senior career*
Years	Team	Apps	(Gls)
2020–2021	RoPS II	20	(0)
2021–2022	RoPS	20	(0)
2023–	VPS II	23	(0)
2023–	VPS	4	(0)
2024	→ VIFK (loan)	9	(0)
2025	→ SalPa (loan)	8	(0)
- * Club domestic league appearances and goals as of 20 November 2025

Lauri-Eemil Tapani Vetri (born 6 March 2003) is a Finnish professional footballer who plays as a goalkeeper for Vaasan Palloseura.
