= Saïdou Bah =

Guinean footballer (born 2003)

Personal information
- Full name: Mamadou Saïdou Bah
- Date of birth: 10 August 2003 (age 23)
- Place of birth: Conakry, Guinea
- Height: 1.85 m (6 ft 1 in)
- Position: Striker

Team information
- Current team: EIF
- Number: 23

Youth career
- CE Òdena
- 2011–2022: Barcelona

Senior career*
Years	Team	Apps	(Gls)
2022–2024	Barcelona B	0	(0)
2022–2023	→ Olot (loan)	20	(1)
2023–2024	→ Badajoz (loan)	18	(0)
2024	SJK Akatemia	3	(0)
2024	SJK Akatemia II	5	(3)
2025–	EIF	31	(4)
- * Club domestic league appearances and goals as of 1 November 2026

Mamadou Saïdou Bah (born 10 August 2003) is a Guinean footballer who plays as a striker for Ykkösliiga club EIF.

== Early life ==
Bah was born in Conakry and moved to Spain at the age of three.

== Career ==
Bah has been described as "a great promise in football".

== Style of play ==
Bah mainly operates as a striker and has been described as "stands out for his speed and overflow in attack".

== Personal life ==
Bah has regarded Argentina international Lionel Messi as his football idol.
