= Denis Cukici =

Finnish footballer (born 2003)

Personal information
- Date of birth: 10 February 2003 (age 23)
- Place of birth: Helsinki, Finland
- Height: 1.81 m (5 ft 11 in)
- Position: Defensive midfielder

Team information
- Current team: KäPa
- Number: 36

Youth career
- –2013: Koivukylän Palloseura
- 2014–2020: HJK

Senior career*
Years	Team	Apps	(Gls)
2020–2021	Klubi 04	35	(0)
2022–2024	SJK II	65	(3)
2024	SJK	0	(0)
2025–	KäPa	34	(1)

International career^{‡}
2018–2019	Finland U16	5	(1)
- * Club domestic league appearances and goals as of 26 July 2026 ‡ National team caps and goals as of 19 February 2024

Denis Cukici (born 10 February 2003) is a Finnish professional footballer who plays as a defensive midfielder for Ykkösliiga side KäPa.

== Club career ==
Cukici started football in a youth team of Koivukylän Palloseura in Koivukylä, Vantaa. In 2014 he joined the youth sector of HJK Helsinki. He advanced through the academy and made his senior debut with the reserve team Klubi 04 in 2020.

In February 2022, Cukici signed with the organisation Veikkausliiga club SJK Seinäjoki. He was first assigned to the club's reserve team SJK Akatemia, competing in the second-tier Ykkönen.

In January 2025, he joined Käpylän Pallo in second-tier Ykkösliiga.

== Personal life ==
Born and raised in Helsinki, Finland, Cukici is of Kosovo Albanian descent.
