= 2026 Ykkösliiga =

Finnish football league season

Ykkösliiga
- Season: 2026
- Dates: 3 April 2026 – 17 October 2026
- Champions: KTP
- Promoted: KTP
- Relegated: KäPa; SJK Akatemia
- Matches: 85
- Goals: 213 (2.51 per match)
- Top goalscorer: Petteri Forsell; Irfan Sadik; Torfiq Ali-Abubakar (7)
- Biggest home win: Haka 5–0 JäPS (21 April 2026); JäPS 5–0 KTP (3 May 2026)
- Biggest away win: JäPS 0–5 PK-35 (12 June 2026)
- Highest scoring: MP 3–3 KTP (25 July 2026)
- All statistics correct as of 31 July 2026.

The 2026 Ykkösliiga was the third season of the Ykkösliiga, the second-highest level of the Finnish football league system. The season began in April 2026 and concluded in October 2026.

== Teams ==
The league consisted of ten teams; seven teams remaining from the previous season, one team promoted from the Ykkönen, and two teams relegated from the Veikkausliiga.

=== Team changes ===
The promoted team was the 2025 Ykkönen champions MP. They replaced the 2025 Ykkösliiga bottom-placed team SalPa.

The relegated teams were the 2025 Veikkausliiga play-off losers KTP and bottom-placed team Haka. They replaced the 2025 Ykkösliiga champions Lahti and Veikkausliiga play-off winners TPS.

=== Stadiums and locations ===
Location of teams in 2026 Ykkösliiga

Club	Location	Stadium	Capacity	Manager
EIF	Raseborg	Ekenäs Centrumplan	1,400	(Finland) Christian Sund
Haka	Valkeakoski	Tehtaan kenttä	3,516	(Finland) Andy Smith
JIPPO	Joensuu	Mehtimäki	1,000	(Finland) Mikko Hallikainen
JäPS	Järvenpää	Keskuskenttä	2,000	(Finland) Teemu Kankkunen
Klubi 04	Helsinki	Bolt Arena	10,770	(Finland) Aleksi Lalli
KTP	Kotka	Arto Tolsa Areena	4,780	(Finland) Joonas Rantanen
KäPa	Helsinki	Brahenkenttä	1,200	(Finland) Lari Lummepuro
MP	Mikkeli	Mikkelin Urheilupuisto	7,000	(Senegal) Issa Thiaw
PK-35	Helsinki	Mustapekka Areena	2,200	(Portugal) Tiago Santos
SJK Akatemia	Seinäjoki	OmaSP Stadion	5,817	(England) Arttu Aromaa

== Season ==
=== League table ===
Pos	Team	Pld	W	D	L	GF	GA	GD	Pts	Promotion, qualification or relegation
1	KTP (C, P)	27	18	5	4	48	26	+22	59	Promotion to the 2027 Veikkausliiga
2	PK-35	27	15	7	5	44	23	+21	52	Qualification for the Veikkausliiga play-off
3	Haka	27	14	5	8	51	31	+20	47	
4	JIPPO	27	13	8	6	38	22	+16	47	
5	JäPS	27	12	2	13	25	41	−16	38	
6	EIF	27	9	5	13	32	46	−14	32	
7	MP	27	8	6	13	29	38	−9	30	
8	Klubi 04	27	6	9	12	37	37	0	27	
9	KäPa (R)	27	6	7	14	33	49	−16	25	Qualification for the Ykkösliiga play-off
10	SJK Akatemia (R)	27	3	8	16	23	47	−24	17	Relegation to the 2027 Ykkönen

Source: Palloliitto
Rules for classification: 1) Points; 2) Goal difference; 3) Goals scored; 4) Head-to-head points; 5) Head-to-head goal difference.
(C) Champions; (P) Promoted; (R) Relegated

=== Results ===
Teams play each other three times in a triple round-robin format, for a total of 27 matches.

Home \ Away	EIF	HAK	JIP	JÄP	KLU	KTP	KÄP	MP	PK	SJK	EIF	HAK	JIP	JÄP	KLU	KTP	KÄP	MP	PK	SJK
EIF	—	2–2	1–2	0–1	2–1	5–2	1–0	1–0	0–3	3–0	—	—	0–2	—	2–0	0–1	3–2	—	—	1–1
Haka	4–3	—	2–1	5–0	1–1	0–2	2–2	0–2	3–0	2–0	3–1	—	3–0	1–2	2–0	—	3–1	—	—	—
JIPPO	1–1	2–1	—	0–0	1–1	0–0	3–0	3–1	0–1	1–0	—	—	—	1–0	3–1	0–2	—	—	0–0	0–1
JäPS	3–0	1–2	0–4	—	1–0	0–1	0–0	0–2	1–0	1–0	1–0	—	—	—	2–0	—	—	1–0	0–5	—
Klubi 04	7–0	2–2	0–2	2–1	—	0–1	1–2	0–1	0–1	1–1	—	—	—	—	—	0–1	2–2	4–3	—	2–0
KTP	5–1	0–2	3–3	4–1	0–0	—	2–1	1–0	0–1	1–0	—	2–1	—	3–0	—	—	2–1	1–1	—	2–1
KäPa	0–1	3–2	0–2	2–1	0–2	1–2	—	1–1	0–0	2–2	—	—	1–3	3–1	—	—	—	—	1–4	2–2
MP	1–0	1–0	1–3	1–2	2–2	3–3	0–1	—	0–3	1–1	0–2	2–1	1–0	—	—	—	2–1	—	—	—
PK-35	4–2	0–0	1–1	3–0	1–1	0–1	3–1	3–1	—	3–2	0–0	1–4	—	—	1–1	0–3	—	2–1	—	—
SJK Akatemia	0–0	0–1	0–0	0–2	2–6	4–3	2–3	1–0	0–1	—	—	0–2	—	2–3	—	—	—	1–1	0–3	—

Source: Palloliitto
Legend: Blue = home team win; Yellow = draw; Red = away team win.

== Ykkösliiga play-off ==
The ninth-placed team (KäPa) faced the second-placed team of the 2026 Ykkönen (RoPS) in a two-legged play-off for the final place in the 2027 Ykkösliiga.

=== First leg ===
22 October 2026	RoPS	1–1	KäPa	Rovaniemi
16:00	McLeod 82'		Toivonen 13'	Stadium: Rovaniemen keskuskenttä

=== Second leg ===
25 October 2026	KäPa	1–1 (a.e.t.) (2–2 agg.) (4–5 p)	RoPS	Helsinki
16:00	Lika 45+1' (pen.)		Varhi 43'	Stadium: Brahenkenttä
	Penalties
	Kuningas (penalty scored); Hietalahti (penalty scored); Ripatti (penalty scored); Lika (penalty scored); Huhtamäki (penalty missed)		(penalty scored) Roiha; (penalty scored) Suutari; (penalty scored) Savolainen; (penalty scored) Listo; (penalty scored) Cato

== Season statistics ==
=== Top scorers ===
As of 22 May 2026

Rank	Player	Club	Goals
1	(England) Imani Lanquedoc	Haka	4
2	(Guinea) Saïdou Bah	Ekenäs IF	3
2	(Japan) Yoshiaki Kikuchi	JIPPO	3
2	(Finland) Yllson Lika	KäPa	3

=== Top assist ===
Rank	Player	Club	Assist

== Awards ==
=== Annual awards ===
Award	Winner	Club
Player of the Year		
Goalkeeper of the Year		
Defender of the Year		
Midfielder of the Year		
Striker of the Year		

== See also ==
- 2026 Veikkausliiga
- 2026 Finnish Cup
- 2026 Ykkönen
- 2026 Kakkonen
