= 2024 Finnish Cup =

Tournament details
- Country: Finland
- Teams: 364

Final positions
- Champions: KuPS
- Runners-up: Inter Turku

The 2024 Finnish Cup was the 70th season of the Finnish Cup football competition. The winners qualified for the 2025–26 Conference League second qualifying round.

Ilves were the defending champions, but they were eliminated by HJK in Round 5.

KuPS won the cup on 21 September 2024 (their fifth Finnish Cup win), defeating Inter Turku 2–1 in the final, which was played in a new Tammelan Stadion, opened in 2023.

For the first time in adult football matches played in the Finnish leagues, a VAR system was used in the semi-finals and a final.

== Calendar ==
Round	Dates	Draw	Number of fixtures	Clubs
Round 0	9 February – 3 March 2024	31 January	70	140 → 70 +170
First round	9 February – 17 March 2024	31 January	120	240 → 120
Second round	12 March – 1 April 2024	5 March	60	120 →60 +48 from Veikkausliiga, Ykkösliiga, Ykkönen, Kakkonen
Third round	16–28 April 2024	3 April	54	108 → 54 +2 from Veikkausliiga(League Cup)
Fourth round	8–12 May 2024	30 April	28	56 → 28 +4 from Veikkausliiga(UEFA Competitions)
Fifth round	15–16 June 2024	16 May	16	32 → 16
Sixth round	25–26 June 2023	16 May	8	16 → 8
Quarter-finals	3 July 2024	27 June	4	8 → 4
Semi-finals	21–22 August 2024	27 June	2	4 → 2
Final	21 September 2024	27 June	1	2 → 1

== Format ==
The cup was played as a one legged knockout tournament. A total of 364 teams participated (the fourth largest in the history of the competition and the largest since 2006). Lower league teams received home advantage until the fourth round. Teams were divided into geographical groups for the draw until 5th round.

== Round 0 ==
The draw was made on 31 January 2024 on the Football Association's (Palloliito) YouTube channel. 140 teams participate in this round. They are divided into eight baskets from ten based on geography. Tie of this round is played in baskets 1-7 & 9.

Number of teams per tier still in competition
Veikkausliiga (1)	Ykkösliiga (2)	Ykkönen (3)	Kakkonen (4)	Kolmonen (5)	Nelonen (6)	Vitonen (7)	Kutonen (8)	Seiska (9)	M35/M40 (+35, +40)	Total
12 / 12	10 / 10	10 / 10	22 / 22	82 / 82	77 / 77	86 / 86	49 / 49	10 / 10	6 / 6	364 / 364

=== Group 1 ===
11 February 2024	FC Juvantus (8)	0–1	HePu (7)	Helsinki
20:00		Report	Von Bagh 84'	Stadium: Tali halli Attendance: 10; Referee: Mohamed Abdelgayed

16 February 2024	Pessoas Boas (8)	2–2 (1–4 p)	Kasiysi (7)	Helsinki
20:00	Puro 4' (yellow card) 71' (yellow-red card) 71'; Saarialho 6'	Report	Haglund (red card) 4'; Jussila 25'; Santasalo 90'	Stadium: Töölö PK 6 Attendance: 52; Referee: Valtteri Ollila

16 February 2024	PK-35/Äijät (9)	1–9	LePa/M40 (+40)	Helsinki
20:00	Kuronen 18'	Report	Talvassalo 5'; 42' (o.g.); Nybäck 53'; Hiltunen 57', 81'; Jåfs 69'; Blanco 74', 90+2'; Järvinen 86'	Stadium: Töölö PK 1 Attendance: 0 Referee: Joel Vanhanen

17 February 2024	Polin Pallo (7)	4–0	Afro Foot Club (7)	Espoo
16:00	Hieta 40', 55', 75'; Paasiviita 80'	Report		Stadium: Keski-Espoo 2

20 February 2024	StaPa De Royale (8)	6–0	Tavastia (7)	Helsinki
19:10	17' (o.g.); Vuoripelto 37'; Haapanen 45'; Purme 66', 78'; Tarkkala 84'	Report		Stadium: Töölö PK 1 Attendance: 40; Referee: Arsene Towa

24 February 2024	FC Samba (7)	1–3	Gilla FC (7)	Espoo
16:30	Kyllönen 64'	Report	Mettälä 17'; Galle 30'; Kiiskinen 59'	Stadium: Keski-Espoo 2 Attendance: 150; Referee: Abdirisag Ahmed

24 February 2024	HPS/Jägers (8)	3–6	FC Pehmeet ja Märät (7)	Helsinki
17:00	Siilin 20', 26'; Granath 44'	Report	Aikio 10', 57', 64', 87'; Anttila 12'; Holmborg 89'	Stadium: Töölö PK 6 Attendance: 0 Referee: Juuso Vuorinen

24 February 2024	EsPa/United (7)	0–3	Chicken Wings (7)	Espoo
19:30		Report	Truong 24'; Jurvanen 49', 65'	Stadium: Matinkylä 1 Attendance: 50; Referee: Mohamed Abdelgayed

25 February 2024	MLHF (8)	0–5	FC POHU/Gettopojat (8)	Myyrmäki
13:00		Report	Paul 17'; Härkönen 31'; Muhire 63'; E Huovinen 69'; Varis 85'	Stadium: Jalkapallostadion; Attendance: 0 Referee: Petri Ojalehto

25 February 2024	FC Kontu/TDJ (8)	0–2	Millbrook FC (7)	Helsinki
14:15		Report	Ahlstedt 52'; M Kastrati 82'	Stadium: Tali halli Attendance: 20; Referee: Niklas Heikkonen

27 February 2024	LPS/7 (9)	1–13	Gnistan/M35 (+35)	Helsinki
20:10	Suutarla 60'	Report	Makowski 9'; Murto 11', 14', 28'; Sihvola 42', 90+2'; Hölttä 54', 62', 82', 85'; Häyrynen 54'; Ah Rantanen 68'; Seilonen 80'	Stadium: Oulunkylä 1 Attendance: 10; Referee: Dennis Antamo

1 March 2024	FC City (8)	2–3	Olarin Kiksi (7)	Helsinki
20:10	Flink 25'; Pylvänen 38'	Report	Rauhala 48'; Lappalainen 67'; Tilli 90+4'	Stadium: Oulunkylä 2 Attendance: 39; Referee: Olli-Oskari Jaakkola

2 March 2024	KoiPS/Dynamo (7)	3–0	FC POHU/Simpsons (7)	Vantaa
19:00	Kokko 21'; Hajilashgari 28'; Airaksinen 31'	Report		Stadium: Tikkurila; Attendance: 15; Referee: Seidou Balla

2 March 2024	Ponnistus/Peruskallio (8)	0–5	SUMU (7)	Helsinki
19:00		Report	Autere 32', 85'; Tahvanainen 45+1'; Bui Minh 80'; N Manninen 89'	Stadium: Töölö PK 1 Attendance: 50; Referee: Mohamed Abdelgayed

2 March 2024	AC Rastaala (8)	0–3	Kilo IF (7)	Kauniainen
20:00		Report	Tinnis 12', 34'; An Jussila 72'	Stadium: GrIFK Arena; Attendance: 0 Referee: Benjamin Hadaya

3 March 2024	OT-77 (9)	0–5	Colo-Colo (7)	Espoo
10:00		Report	Karmi 15'; Laakso 32', 42', 75'; Suvanto 54'	Stadium: Espoonlahti 2 Attendance: 20; Referee: Arsene Towa

=== Group 2 ===
10 February 2024	FC Pakila (9)	0–8	PEP (7)	Helsinki
19:00		Report	Laukkanen 3', 78'; Hammar-Staf 27'; Uusnäkki 30'; Reijola 52'; Alakurtti 59'; Al-Jlewhi 63'; Varo 75'	Stadium: Töölö PK 6 Attendance: 0 Referee: Janne Juote

14 February 2024	Pöxyt/M35 (+35)	7–0	AC StaSi (8)	Espoo
20:00	Kovalenko 3', 14'; Lumivaara 21'; Björkell 43'; Toivanen 45'; Kosonen 53', 73'	Report		Stadium: Keski-Espoo 2 Attendance: 6 Referee: Niklas Heikkonen

16 February 2024	ToTe/Arabia (9)	0–15	Gnistan/3 (8)	Helsinki
20:00		Report	Laurell 16', 24', 68'; Vesala 25'; Tuominen 35'; Pellinen 37'; Lappalainen 50'; Sinkkilä 54'; Ahtiainen 57', 72'; Salomaa 61'; Keränen 76'; Leskinen 79'; Rimpelä 83'; Tun La 90'	Stadium: Oulunkylä 1 Attendance: 1,000; Referee: Dennis Antamo

17 February 2024	FC Mango (8)	3–0	Ponnistus/2 (7)	Helsinki
19:00	Madidilu 18'; Rajkovic 26', 35'	Report		Stadium: Töölö PK 6 Attendance: 0 Referee: Janne Juote

18 February 2024	MPS/AtleticoAkatemia (7)	1–1 (3–2 p)	SAPA/2 (7)	Helsinki
19:00	Lundberg 6'	Report	Keski-Pukkila 90'	Stadium: Töölö PK 6 Attendance: 1 Referee: Joel Vanhanen

23 February 2024	FC Lähiö (9)	1–3	FC Inter Vuosaari (7)	Helsinki
20:05	Quick 80'	Report	Lomidze 37', 82'; Y Omar 85'	Stadium: Oulunkylä 1 Attendance: 0 Referee: Vilho Jokinen

24 February 2024	TiPS/Legends (8)	3–2	KaPy (7)	Vantaa
12:00	Lappalainen 31', 55'; Nirkko 90+2'	Report	Ruotsalainen 38'; Veräväinen 53'	Stadium: Tikkurila; Attendance: 0 Referee: Reko Morikawa

24 February 2024	FC Korso/United (7)	0–2	FC POHU/JäPa (7)	Vantaa
16:00		Report	Kinnunen 48'; Rautakoski 54'	Stadium: Tikkurila; Attendance: 7 Referee: Larbi Boughdiri

24 February 2024	PiTa (8)	0–2	FC Spital (7)	Helsinki
16:00		Report	Keinänen 60', 90+1'	Stadium: Töölö PK 1 Attendance: 0 Referee: Ville Väänänen

24 February 2024	Vietfin FC (8)	3–1	KeiKa (8)	Helsinki
19:00	Nguyen Anh 10', 18'; Tran Truong 64'	Report	Vara	Stadium: Töölö PK 6 Attendance: 25; Referee: Arsene Towa

25 February 2024	HIFK/3 (7)	0–2	Nikinmäki United (7)	Helsinki
17:00		Report	P Lampinen 46'; Stirkkinen 90+1'	Stadium: Töölö PK 1 Attendance: 50; Referee: Mohamed Abdelgayed

25 February 2024	FC Dons/Akatemia (8)	0–7	FC POHU/KY United (7)	Helsinki
20:00		Report	Kivimäki 19', 29', 85'; E Lehtinen 28'; Torkki 40'; Määttä 61'; Paloneva 75'	Stadium: Tali halli Attendance: 0 Referee: Vilho Jokinen

28 February 2024	MK-United (7)	2–0	PK-35/2 (7)	Myyrmäki
20:00	Özkahveci 18'; 50' (o.g.)	Report		Stadium: Jalkapallostadion; Attendance: 0 Referee: Gezim Arifi

1 March 2024	Andalus FC (7)	3–3 (4–5 p)	FC Hieho (7)	Helsinki
20:00	A Mekhane 18'; Hajiahmed 88', 90'	Report	Vehviläinen 56', 70', 76'	Stadium: Töölö PK 6 Attendance: 15; Referee: Seidou Balla

2 March 2024	I-HK/Sensaatio (7)	0–1	ToTe/Keparoi (7)	Helsinki
20:00		Report	Melasniemi 22'	Stadium: Töölö PK Sahara; Attendance: 20; Referee: Jukka Aakko

3 March 2024	HJK/Töölön Ihme (8)	1–1 (5–4 p)	Kullervo/Mosaic (8)	Helsinki
17:00	Kivistö-Rahnasto 21'	Report	Kinnaslampi 87'	Stadium: Töölö PK 6 Attendance: 69; Referee: Otso Simola

=== Group 3 ===
16 February 2024	TuPV (8)	0–1	TuNL (7)	Turku
20:00		Report	Tirronen 85'	Stadium: Kupittaa 5 Attendance: 0 Referee: Niilo Heikkinen

22 February 2024	KuuLa/2 (8)	0–2	MaPS 2 (7)	Turku
21:15		Report	Sankari 36'; Lönnroth 76'	Stadium: Turku Energia Areena; Attendance: 0 Referee: Mohammed Abdou

25 February 2024	FC RP (7)	3–2	SC Wolves (7)	Paimio
13:00	Aalto 30', 45+2'; Rättö 34'	Report	Ahanen 43'; Kostiainen 67'	Stadium: Soikka; Attendance: 45; Referee: Aleksi Keronen

25 February 2024	FC Snåbit (7)	0–2	Torre Calcio (7)	Naantali
20:00		Report	Montola 29'; Penttinen 73'	Stadium: Karvetti; Attendance: 20; Referee: Luke Mcconnell

27 February 2024	Qppis (8)	1–9	TPS/M35 (+35)	Turku
20:15	Uotinen 27'	Report	Kuisma 8', 57'; Hyyrynen 11', 18', 45', 56'; Hakala 23'; Hämäläinen 30'; Tuomanen 33'	Stadium: Kupittaa 5 Attendance: 0 Referee: Vili Lehtovaara

29 February 2024	AFC Campus (7)	2–2 (5–3 p)	LiePa (7)	Turku
19:00	Bäckström 78', 84'	Report	Munoz Thiel 18'; Nieminen 49'	Stadium: Kupittaa 5 Attendance: 9 Referee: Mika Lamppu

1 March 2024	San Siro (8)	2–3	FC Inter 3 (8)	Turku
19:00	Ibrahim 13'; Farah Mohamed 20'	Report	I Najjar 48'; Slavgorodskij 49', 61'	Stadium: Turku Energia Areena; Attendance: 15; Referee: Ari-Petteri Finnberg

2 March 2024	LoPS (7)	0–6	FC Boda (7)	Paimio
16:15		Report	Ivars 11', 36', 77'; Diaz 30', 57'; Lindroos 66'	Stadium: Soikka; Attendance: 30; Referee: L Mati Sarmad

3 March 2024	ÅIFK/2 (7)	0–1	JyTy (7)	Turku
18:15		Report	Hovi 65'	Stadium: Turku Energia Areena; Attendance: 80; Referee: Lauri Kuvaja

3 March 2024	Torre Calcio 2 (8)	0–8	KuuLa (7)	Naantali
20:00		Report	Hulkkonen 28'; Brenner 45+1'; Koskinen 53'; Turtola 55', 70', 77', 81'; Viitaharju 86'	Stadium: Karvetti; Attendance: 35; Referee: Mohammed Abdou

=== Group 4 ===
24 February 2024	Velenpojat (9)	3–5	Karhu-Futis (7)	Valkeakoski
12:00	Kartela 2'; Surkka 36'; Antila 67'	Report	Ranta 39'; Pihlavisto 45'; Ruotsalainen 49'; Luotonen 60'; M Niinisalo 90+1'	Stadium: Palloiluhalli; Attendance: 30; Referee: Mikko Toivonen

24 February 2024	AC Darra (9)	2–4	Ilves/3 (7)	Tampere
13:00	O Seppälä 24', 41'	Report	T Jokinen 14'; Sonne 42'; Nikkilä 48'; Salminen 80'	Stadium: Tammelan stadion Attendance: 0 Referee: Henrik Sandmark

24 February 2024	FC Eurajoki/II (8)	1–1 (2–4 p)	LLuja (7)	Rauma
13:15	D Ciastek 5'	Report	Borda 13'	Stadium: Äijänsuo stadion Attendance: 30; Referee: Niko Parviainen

24 February 2024	FC Helmi Jätkä (9)	2–2 (4–2 p)	JanPa (7)	Tampere
14:00	Tuominen 53'; 90+1' (o.g.)	Report	S Nousimaa 45+1'; H Nummenpää 76'	Stadium: Kauppi 1 Attendance: 50; Referee: Juha Kivistö

24 February 2024	Tampere United/3 (8)	3–3 (5–3 p)	FC Vapsi (8)	Tampere
17:00	Kauppinen 9'; Kopf 37'; Peltonen 76'	Report	Liuha 46'; Katila 66'; Hakanen 90+3'	Stadium: Kauppi 1 Attendance: 20; Referee: Markus Tuovinen

24 February 2024	FC Kangasala (7)	10–0	LuVe (7)	Nokia
17:15	Tuomi 3', 27', 69'; O Niemi 24'; M Al-Tallab 45+1', 79'; Lehtola 46'; Palmu 53', 77', 88'	Report		Stadium: Menkala; Attendance: 78; Referee: Tommi Lehtimäki

25 February 2024	TaPa/2 (8)	4–2	HJS/sininen (8)	Tampere
20:20	N Aalto 39'; Heinonen 55', 58'; Seppälä 73'	Report	R Kumpulainen 54'; Marttila 90+2'	Stadium: Pirkkahalli C Attendance: 0 Referee: Roope Nutikka

26 February 2024	FC Haka-j/musta (8)	3–0	Ilves/4 (8)	Valkeakoski
20:15	Kautto 5', 65'; Karvinen 60'	Report		Stadium: Palloiluhalli; Attendance: 23; Referee: Kimmo Jääskeläinen

27 February 2024	Tyrwään Palloseura (8)	4–1	PoPa (7)	Tampere
18:30	J Koivuniemi 15'; Ak Lehtimäki 27'; Hakala 49'; Leikkanen 58'	Report	Karonen 82'	Stadium: Kauppi 2 Attendance: 0 Referee: Tommi Lehtimäki

1 March 2024	Universtas/M35 (+35)	2–4	Fish United (7)	Tampere
18:00	Elonen 24', 76'	Report	B Laouini 19'; Pietikäinen 26'; Formulahti 42'; Oksanen 70'	Stadium: Kauppi 2 Attendance: 30; Referee: Juha Franssila

2 March 2024	LaVe/KPR (7)	5–0	NePa (7)	Hämeenlinna
18:00	N Hesso 29', 38'; E Perälä 64'; A Aakkula 69', 89'	Report		Stadium: Säästöpankki Areena; Attendance: 30; Referee: Jukka Välikangas

3 March 2024	SOHO SS (9)	3–3 (4–3 p)	Ilves-Kissat juniorit (8)	Tampere
16:00	Nyström 48'; Kumara 50'; Tiainen 61'	Report	Sapkota 14'; Nikoskelainen 17'; Hasan (yellow card) 42' (yellow-red card) 61'; Jafari 80'	Stadium: Kauppi 1 Attendance: 0 Referee: Mikko Särkiniemi

8 March 2024	ViiPV (8)	0–3	Tuisku (7)	Valkeakoski
21:15		Report	Pirttinen 39'; Ee Koskinen 49'; Er Koskinen 58'	Stadium: Palloiluhalli; Attendance: 0 Referee: Teemu Virolainen

=== Group 5 ===
25 February 2024	HAlku/FC (8)	0–5	ToBK (7)	Järvenpää
20:20		Report	Augustsson 19', 26', 73'; Carlsson 50'; Eriksson 69'	Stadium: Monitoimihalli; Attendance: 50; Referee: Jarkko Rantanen

29 February 2024	JäPS/United (8)	1–9	FCFJ (7)	Järvenpää
20:30	Sam Kukkonen 39'	Report	T Vähäkuopus 27'; Doan 30', 33', 44'; Roos 35', 71'; Ranta 37'; Siljamo 68'; Demirtas 78'	Stadium: Monitoimihalli; Attendance: 100; Referee: Dennis Antamo

3 March 2024	TuPS/M35 (+35)	3–0	FC Kirkkonummi/2 (7)	Tuusula
11:45	Fihlman 55', 65'; J Tiira 62'	Report		Stadium: Hyrylä UK; Attendance: 0 Referee: Jarkko Rantanen

=== Group 6 ===
17 February 2024	Flamingo United (7)	7–1	HaPK Edustus/2 (7)	Lahti
15:00	Ahapov 8', 39', 45+1', 53'; Ishema 45'; Shuku 48'; Rajabi 88'	Report	Kolsi 66'	Stadium: Kisapuisto Stadion; Attendance: 0 Referee: Pessi Pursiainen

18 February 2024	FC Villisiat (8)	2–2 (5–4 p)	PaPe (8)	Kuusankoski
16:00	Pulkki 58', 64'	Report	Hasam Rostam 42'; Pakarinen 85'	Stadium: Sami Hyypiä Areena; Attendance: 0 Referee: Vesa-Pekka Volanen

18 February 2024	KarPo (8)	0–10	PoPo (8)	Kotka
17:00		Report	Salo 5'; Laitinen 30', 33'; Hänninen 47'; Rikberg 54', 89'; Lauretsalo 57'; S Huttunen 73', 83'; Huusari 76'	Stadium: Urheiluhalli; Attendance: 80; Referee: Atte Henriksson

18 February 2024	Nopsa (7)	3–1	KyPa (7)	Lahti
19:30	Rusanen 28'; Helenius 78'; Salminen (yellow card) 59' (yellow-red card) 82'; Niukkanen 90+4'	Report	Toivanen 59'; Peltoniemi (yellow card) 74' (yellow-red card) 85'; Kuusimäki (yellow card) 76' (yellow-red card) 87'	Stadium: Mukkula Halli; Attendance: 35; Referee: Antti Heikkinen

25 February 2024	Lahden United (8)	2–2 (5–6 p)	Jäntevä/Ukot (8)	Lahti
19:15	Brang 57'; Yusif (red card) 70'; Al Okam 81'	Report	Helenius 15'; Hono 90+3'	Stadium: Mukkula Halli; Attendance: 42; Referee: Tero Tammivuori

29 February 2024	HP-47 (7)	0–0 (4–3 p)	FC Kuusysi/2 (7)	Lahti
19:30		Report		Stadium: Mukkula Halli; Attendance: 47; Referee: Tero Juurinen

=== Group 7 ===
25 February 2024	Komeetat/Piuku (8)	3–0	Juniori STPS (7)	Jyväskylä
14:15	Piik 71'; Sääskilahti 76'; Piippanen 88'	Report		Stadium: Vehkahalli; Attendance: 50; Referee: Kalle Ruokamo

2 March 2024	Nousu (8)	2–2 (3–5 p)	MuurY (7)	Jyväskylä
20:00	Lampila 11', 58'	Report	Paananen 9'; Björn 20'	Stadium: Vehkahalli; Attendance: 75; Referee: Justus Willman

3 March 2024	Komeetat/3 (7)	0–0 (5–3 p)	JiiKoo (7)	Jyväskylä
14:00		Report		Stadium: Vehkahalli; Attendance: 100; Referee: Juuso Pusa

3 March 2024	LuoVu (7)	4–2	KonnU (7)	Jyväskylä
20:00	Koskinen 8', 30'; Toivonen 13'; Ruotanen 27'	Report	Tani 58', 68'	Stadium: Vehkahalli; Attendance: 35; Referee: Mikko Lehtola

=== Group 9 ===
23 February 2024	KoPo (7)	1–2	BK-48/2 (7)	Kokkola
21:00	Koivisto 16'; Hautamäki (yellow card) 89' (yellow-red card) 90+6'	Report	Hiekkanen 84', 90+2'	Stadium: Kipparihall; Attendance: 110; Referee: Tony Mäki

2 March 2024	APV (7)	3–3 (5–4 p)	FC KOMU (7)	Kuortane
21:00	Toivonen 41', 79'; N Maja 90+9'	Report	L Jääskä 3'; Ra Jääskä 27', 56'	Stadium: Ilkka-Areena; Attendance: 0 Referee: Marko Ranne

== Round 1 ==
The Round 1 draw was made on the same day as Round 0 on the Football Association's (Palloliito) YouTube channel. 240 teams (including 70 winners from Round 0), participated in this round. They were divided into ten sections based on geography. The winners proceeded to Round 2.

Number of teams per tier still in competition
Veikkausliiga (1)	Ykkösliiga (2)	Ykkönen (3)	Kakkonen (4)	Kolmonen (5)	Nelonen (6)	Vitonen (7)	Kutonen (8)	Seiska (9)	M35 (+35)	Total
12 / 12	10 / 10	10 / 10	22 / 22	82 / 82	77 / 77	55 / 86	19 / 49	2 / 10	5 / 6	294 / 364

=== Group 1 ===
17 February 2024	EsPa (5)	2–1	Toukolan Teräs (5)	Espoo
17:00	Virkkunen 5'; Blumberg 25'	Report	Haglund 53'	Stadium: Matinkylä 1 Attendance: 68; Referee: Mohamed Abdelgayed

24 February 2024	EPS/Reservi (5)	3–1	PPJ/Lauttasaari (5)	Espoo
14:00	Naarvala-De Freitas 86', 90+5'; Bister 90+2'	Report	Jung 72'; I Karjalainen (yellow card) 22' (yellow-red card) 77'	Stadium: Espoonlahti 2 Attendance: 20; Referee: Olli Jantunen

28 February 2024	FC Kirkkonummi (5)	3–0	SAPA (5)	Kirkkonummi
19:30	Silander 61'; Granlund 65'; Kuparinen 73'	Report		Stadium: Urheilupuisto; Attendance: 48; Referee: Dennis Antamo

8 March 2024	HIFK/2 (5)	3–3 (6–5 p)	Gnistan/Ogeli (5)	Helsinki
20:00	Halme 72'; Kiema 78'; Leskinen 88'	Report	Kinnunen 37'; Petäjä 64'; Hietavuo 77'	Stadium: Töölö PK 1 Attendance: 350; Referee: Arsene Towa

10 March 2024	FC Dons (6)	2–3	HPS (5)	Helsinki
14:15	Kilpinen 3', 58'	Report	Mäkinen 7'; Törnblom 47', 90+2'	Stadium: Tali halli Attendance: 30; Referee: Seidou Balla

10 March 2024	FC Kiffen/3 (6)	2–3	FC POHU/Hurjin (6)	Helsinki
19:00	Niskanen 18'; Reini 65' (pen.)	Report	Kilpeläinen 55'; Stergakis 56'; Taanila 89'	Stadium: Töölö PK 1 Attendance: 20; Referee: Gezim Arifi

10 March 2024	Pöxyt/TNT (6)	5–0	ToTe/Taiskin Tykit (6)	Espoo
19:30	Ollikka 12'; Virta 45', 53'; Koski 59'; Sundell 73'	Report		Stadium: Laaksolahti; Attendance: 32; Referee: Antti Hannuksela

15 March 2024	Olarin Kiksi (7)	1–8	Polin Pallo (7)	Kirkkonummi
19:00	Tilli 25'	Report	Paasiviita 19', 37', 48', 53', 61'; Halonen 41', 90+1'; Simpson 59'	Stadium: Urheilupuisto; Attendance: 50; Referee: Matias Marjander

16 March 2024	LePa/M40 (+40)	0–11	HJK/Kantsu (6)	Espoo
14:00		Report	Lillqvist 15', 44'; Astala 20', 22'; Kajander 53', 65'; Salin 58', 67'; Mehtäläinen 70', 80', 90+1'	Stadium: Metsämaa; Attendance: 10; Referee: Seidou Balla

16 March 2024	NuPS/2 (6)	4–1	LePa/Bangers (6)	Nummela
16:30	Timmerbacka 18'; Lehikoinen 80'; Jussila 86'; Kajeniemi 90+1'	Report	Onttonen 7'	Stadium: Certos Areena halli Attendance: 90; Referee: Janne Ylijääskö

16 March 2024	Kasiysi (7)	0–3	Kilo IF (7)	Espoo
16:30		Report	Asyrankulov 17'; Tinnis 28'; Saarinen 45'	Stadium: Keski-Espoo 2 Attendance: 10; Referee: Gezim Arifi

16 March 2024	Colo-Colo (7)	2–11	MPS/Atletico Malmi (5)	Helsinki
19:00	Sundman 13'; Komulainen 88'	Report	Hänninen 19', 30'; Lindström 22', 86'; Lankinen 26'; Jo Ketonen 31'; Nousiainen 45'; Lehtonen 55'; Ulander 66', 83'; Ruotsalainen 74'	Stadium: Töölö PK 6 Attendance: 15; Referee: Seidou Balla

16 March 2024	TiPS/2 (6)	1–9	KäPa/2 (6)	Vantaa
19:00	Launonen 10'; Parkkonen (red card) 50'	Report	Harja 2', 50'; Nieminen 57', 72'; Lindfors 70', 75'; Pulkkinen 79'; Svensk 81'; Karlsson 88'	Stadium: Tikkurila; Attendance: 20; Referee: Mohamed Abdelgayed

17 March 2024	Vesa (6)	4–0	Kurvin Vauhti (6)	Helsinki
19:00	M Hämäläinen 5'; Rissanen 39'; Jo Havunen 47'; Rask 87'	Report	Leinonen (yellow card) 80' (yellow-red card) 80'	Stadium: Töölö PK 6 Attendance: 30; Referee: Mohamed Abdelgayed

17 March 2024	Etu-Töölön Urhot (6)	1–1 (5–4 p)	Ponnistus (5)	Helsinki
19:00	Puolakka 28'	Report	Laakkonen 70'	Stadium: Töölö PK 1 Attendance: 30; Referee: Rurik Osola

17 March 2024	HePu (7)	0–3	Valtti/2 (6)	Helsinki
20:00		Report	56' (o.g.); Leo Miskala 72'; Ervasti 88'	Stadium: Tali halli Attendance: 10; Referee: Arsene Towa

22 March 2024	Chicken Wings (7)	1–1 (10–9 p)	Ponnistajat (5)	Helsinki
20:00	Lukjanov 3'	Report	Pujals 82'	Stadium: Töölö PK 6 Attendance: 20; Referee: Mohamed Abdelgayed

22 March 2024	FC POHU/Gettopojat (8)	1–4	KoiPS/Dynamo (7)	Helsinki
20:00	Varis 29'	Report	Kaihlavirta 28'; Kokko 33'; Hajilashgari 47'; El Pasanen 65'	Stadium: Oulunkylä 2 Attendance: 50; Referee: Erdal Karsandi

24 March 2024	FC Pehmeet ja Märät (7)	1–5	Millbrook FC (7)	Helsinki
14:00	Lehtinen 14'	Report	M Kastrati 12', 45', 90+2'; Jaba 56'; Ahmed-Kassen 72'	Stadium: Tali halli Attendance: 50; Referee: Mohamed Abdelgayed

24 March 2024	Töölön Taisto (5)	2–0	GrIFK/U23 (5)	Helsinki
19:00	Appelqvist 40'; Lassila 54'	Report		Stadium: Töölö PK 6 Attendance: 40; Referee: Gezim Arifi

24 March 2024	StaPa De Royale (8)	1–0	Gilla FC (7)	Helsinki
19:00	Leppälä 23' (pen.)	Report		Stadium: Töölö PK 1 Attendance: 500; Referee: Christian De Casseres

24 March 2024	SUMU (7)	1–7	Gnistan/M35 (+35)	Helsinki
20:00	Bui Minh 88'	Report	6' (o.g.); Halme 12', 83'; Hölttä 31'; Seilonen 68'; Makowski 89', 90+1'	Stadium: Oulunkylä 1 Attendance: 0 Referee: Valtteri Ollila

=== Group 2 ===
1 March 2024	Atlantis FC/PM (5)	6–0	HerTo (5)	Helsinki
20:00	Åkerlund 6'; Söderlund 20', 28'; Fazli 42'; Tarkiainen 46', 82'	Report		Stadium: Töölö PK 1 Attendance: 10; Referee: Mikko Lipsanen

2 March 2024	FC Inter Vuosaari (7)	1–9	LePa (6)	Helsinki
20:00	Muhudiin Ahmed 51'	Report	E Hirvonen 7', 37'; M Hirvonen 21'; 34' (o.g.); Sorsa 45+4'; Pelkonen 60', 89'; Anio 67'; Kontio 74'	Stadium: Kartano 2

8 March 2024	Valtti (5)	2–1	LJS (5)	Helsinki
20:00	Niemi 32'; Lehto 44'	Report	Hayni 74'; Aso (yellow card) 68' (yellow-red card) 77'	Stadium: Töölö PK 6 Attendance: 17; Referee: Roberto Miranda

10 March 2024	TiPS/Legends (8)	0–6	Tikka (6)	Vantaa
12:00	Nirkko (yellow card) 37' (yellow-red card) 69'	Report	Winogradow 9', 36'; Salgado Ismodes 44'; Eskola 60'; Malik 63', 68'	Stadium: Tikkurila; Attendance: 40; Referee: Matti Blom

10 March 2024	ToTe/Akatemia (6)	3–0	PETO (6)	Helsinki
19:00	Friman 31'; Lähdeniemi 73'; Salin 88'	Report		Stadium: Töölö PK 6 Attendance: 0 Referee: Mohamed Abdelgayed

11 March 2024	Gnistan/3 (8)	1–8	FC Germania (6)	Helsinki
20:00	Sinkkilä 40'	Report	Fliri 4', 16', 35'; Bichik 24', 72'; Voufack Noubouo 51' (pen.); Boukrim 83', 88'	Stadium: Oulunkylä 1 Attendance: 50; Referee: Lauri Kurki

13 March 2024	MK-United (7)	1–3	EsPa/Renat (6)	Myyrmäki
20:00	Abdulkadir Abdi 35'	Report	Tainio 69'; Karttunen 79'; Bodur 84'	Stadium: Jalkapallostadion; Attendance: 0 Referee: Gezim Arifi

15 March 2024	HJK/Töölön Ihme (8)	0–29	FC Kontu (5)	Helsinki
20:00		Report	Painilainen 3'; Kirpu 8', 9', 26', 49', 53', 59'; Oris 12'; J Tukiainen 13', 36', 42', 68', 79'; Törö 23', 25', 65'; Pimiä 33'; M Tukiainen 37', 55', 75', 88', 90+1'; Lindgren 39'; Kilic 70', 76', 81', 84'; Gautam 83'; Bhar 90'	Stadium: Töölö PK 6 Attendance: 69; Referee: Niklas Heikkonen

15 March 2024	Jokerit FC (6)	1–2	HPS/2 (6)	Helsinki
20:00	Ahonius 66'	Report	Tast 6'; Pähti 72'	Stadium: Töölö PK 1 Attendance: 20; Referee: Elmo Otronen

15 March 2024	ToTe/Keparoi (7)	0–2	SUMU/sob (6)	Helsinki
20:00	Amanatey (yellow card) 42' (yellow-red card) 85'	Report	Hiiesalu 50', 90+4'	Stadium: Oulunkylä 2 Attendance: 23; Referee: Gezim Arifi

16 March 2024	Pöxyt/M35 (+35)	4–0	FC POHU/JäPa (7)	Espoo
14:00	Kovalenko 43'; Lumivaara 63', 90'; Jääskelä 73' (pen.)	Report		Stadium: Keski-Espoo 2 Attendance: 15; Referee: Erdal Karsandi

16 March 2024	Nikinmäki United (7)	0–3	FC POHU/KY United (7)	Vantaa
16:30		Report	Torkki 50'; Myllö 68'; Höynälä 77'	Stadium: Tikkurila; Attendance: 15; Referee: Valtteri Ollila

16 March 2024	FC Mango (8)	0–13	PuiU (5)	Helsinki
19:00	Haxhiu (yellow card) 14' (yellow-red card) 20'	Report	Forssander 3'; Wille 9', 54'; Ruumensaari 15'; Te Honkaniemi 21' (pen.), 52', 76'; Lamppu 49', 68', 71'; Ivanenko 70'; Kolesnik 78', 82'	Stadium: Töölö PK 1 Attendance: 0 Referee: Heikki Venhola

16 March 2024	FC Espoo (5)	1–5	PPJ/Ruoholahti (5)	Espoo
19:00	Maxwell 69'	Report	Filppu 2'; Mi Vartiainen 34', 48', 49'; Laaksonen 36'	Stadium: Laaksolahti; Attendance: 19; Referee: Arsene Towa

17 March 2024	FC Fortuna (6)	2–4	HooGee (5)	Helsinki
14:15	Gorskov 6'; Solovyev 69'	Report	D Langhoff 31', 37'; S Langhoff 56'; Hannula 66'	Stadium: Tali halli Attendance: 50; Referee: Arsene Towa

17 March 2024	KoiPS (6)	3–1	MPS (5)	Myyrmäki
19:00	Miettinen 21', 42' (pen.); Hakola 90+3'	Report	Alajoki 43'	Stadium: Myyrmäki-halli; Attendance: 62; Referee: Otto Helin

22 March 2024	Vietfin FC (8)	0–11	TiPS (5)	Helsinki
20:00		Report	Jrad 13', 57', 72'; Heikari 19', 21'; Mubarik 46'; Pyhämäki 49'; Muttonen 71', 77'; Jmaali 81'; Jeskanen 90'	Stadium: Töölö PK 1 Attendance: 10; Referee: Seidou Balla

23 March 2024	PEP (7)	1–3	FC Finnkurd (5)	Espoo
14:00	Uusnäkki 72'	Report	Khasrawi 17'; Fechus 51'; Bernal 82'	Stadium: Metsämaa; Attendance: 57; Referee: Kim Junna

23 March 2024	FC Hieho (7)	0–6	PPS/Old Stars (6)	Helsinki
15:00		Report	Vainio 39', 48', 63'; Tan 56', 90'; Lindqvist 67'	Stadium: Tali halli Attendance: 0 Referee: Juuso Vuorinen

23 March 2024	FC Vuosaari (6)	0–9	LPS (5)	Helsinki
19:00	Kärki (yellow card) 49' (yellow-red card) 75'		Koivisto 5'; 20' (o.g.); Riikonen 29', 66', 85'; Ailio 50' (pen.), 52'; Virolainen 73'; Viinikari 86'	Stadium: Töölö PK 6 Attendance: 0 Referee: Erdal Karsandi

23 March 2024	FC Spital (7)	1–2	VJS/2 (5)	Helsinki
19:00	Merras 90+3'	Report	Laitila 17'; Niemelä 49'	Stadium: Töölö PK 1 Attendance: 15; Referee: Seidou Balla

24 March 2024	MPS/AtleticoAkatemia (7)	1–4	FC POHU (6)	Helsinki
20:00	Turu 86'	Report	Diallo 12', 36'; Hosaini 72'; Ayyar 79'	Stadium: Tali halli Attendance: 37; Referee: Dennis Antamo

=== Group 3 ===
8 March 2024	TuNL (7)	1–7	VG-62 (5)	Naantali
19:45	Khasrawi 55'	Report	Lehtinen 27'; Mikkonen 31', 65', 66'; Siltanen 34'; Soppi 70'; Nurmi 75'	Stadium: Karvetti; Attendance: 30; Referee: Malte Enlund

12 March 2024	AFC Campus (7)	0–10	PIF (5)	Turku
18:15		Report	Laine 13', 55', 60'; Arminen 32'; Nevä 34'; A Westerlund 41'; Andersson 75', 80', 89'; I Westerlund 83'	Stadium: Kupittaa 5 Attendance: 0 Referee: Aso Alanso

12 March 2024	FC Inter 3 (8)	2–4	EIF/Akademi (5)	Turku
19:00	Naakka 37'; I Najjar 40'; Slavgorodskij (yellow card) 30' (yellow-red card) 89'	Report	Lynch 14'; Lindroos 23'; Valadi-Sumesaraie 28'; T Ryhänen 90+4'	Stadium: Turku Energia Areena; Attendance: 400; Referee: Niilo Heikkinen

12 March 2024	TPS/M35 (+35)	2–0	SalPa 2 (5)	Turku
20:15	Hyyrynen 74'; Kuisma 90'	Report		Stadium: Kupittaa 5 Attendance: 39; Referee: Aleksi Keronen

14 March 2024	JyTy (7)	0–3	KuuLa (7)	Naantali
19:30		Report	Ja Liukkonen 29'; Viitaharju 51', 81'	Stadium: Karvetti; Attendance: 200; Referee: Juho Heikkilä

15 March 2024	FC Boda (7)	0–9	Masku (5)	Paimio
20:00		Report	Rajala 39'; Forss 43', 70', 73', 89'; Vanhanen 66', 81', 83'; Kankkunen 90'	Stadium: Soikka; Attendance: 38; Referee: Niilo Heikkinen

16 March 2024	ÅCF (6)	1–2	KaaPo (5)	Kaarina
15:25	E Snicker 43'; J Snicker (red card) 88'	Report	Barbata 36'; Nurmi 85' (pen.)	Stadium: Puuha-areena; Attendance: 20; Referee: Aleksi Keronen

16 March 2024	PiPS (6)	1–1 (4–3 p)	LTU (6)	Paimio
17:30	Hoda 69'	Report	D Hörkkö 54'	Stadium: Soikka; Attendance: 85; Referee: Petri Johansson

16 March 2024	FC Bosna (8)	0–1	FC RP (7)	Paimio
19:15		Report	Kakko 20'	Stadium: Soikka; Attendance: 115; Referee: Niilo Heikkinen

16 March 2024	MaPS 2 (7)	0–6	TuWe (6)	Naantali
19:30		Report	Korbelainen 9', 52'; Eloneva 35', 61', 84'; Käki 85'	Stadium: Karvetti; Attendance: 0 Referee: Mohammed Abdou

22 March 2024	Torre Calcio (7)	3–5	FC HIK (6)	Turku
20:00	Blomqvist 55'; Penttinen 66'; Kankare 89'	Report	Hamdi 41', 55'; Winberg 47', 52', 59'	Stadium: Turku Energia Areena; Attendance: 11; Referee: Gabriel Anton

=== Group 4 ===
17 February 2024	FC Eurajoki (6)	0–4	FC Haka j. (5)	Rauma
13:15		Report	Rautio 6', 42'; Nyman 67', 88'	Stadium: Äijänsuo stadion Attendance: 0 Referee: Niko Parviainen

25 February 2024	ACE (5)	1–4	NoPS (5)	Tampere
19:00	Rautiainen 82'	Report	Ala-Hakuni 20'; Valkama 64'; Peltola 67'; Siljander 86'	Stadium: Kauppi 3 Attendance: 25; Referee: Tuukka Virtanen

9 March 2024	Ilves/3 (7)	0–3	Tampere United/2 (5)	Tampere
16:00		Report	Häyhä (red card) 42'; Rantala 46'; Käsper 88', 90'	Stadium: Kauppi 2 Attendance: 0 Referee: Hannu Pajunen

11 March 2024	Tyrwään Palloseura (8)	0–6	VaKP (6)	Valkeakoski
21:15		Report	Salonen 19', 89'; Rantanen 38'; Collin 41'; Leppänen 54'; Rautanen 58'	Stadium: Palloiluhalli; Attendance: 50; Referee: Ville Männikkö

14 March 2024	TPV/2 (6)	0–2	MuSa (5)	Tampere
18:30	Sebti (red card) 50'	Report	Simeon 31'; Georgiev 45'	Stadium: Kauppi 3 Attendance: 57; Referee: Kalle Mäkinen

15 March 2024	Tuisku (7)	0–2	NoPS 2 (6)	Nokia
20:15		Report	Sarvala 30'; Kikalov 47'	Stadium: Menkala; Attendance: 0 Referee: Kalle Mäkinen

16 March 2024	FC Lasten (6)	1–2	Ylöjärvi United FC (5)	Tampere
16:00	Mäki 50'	Report	Somppi 6'; Ylihärsilä 66'	Stadium: Kauppi 3 Attendance: 100; Referee: Lauri Luomala

16 March 2024	SOHO SS (9)	1–10	PP-70 (5)	Tampere
16:00	Nyström 43'	Report	Ahonen 22'; Pero 28', 57'; Klint 46', 50'; Pukkila 48'; Tiilikainen 55', 67'; Chalhoub 61'; Kukkonen 76'	Stadium: Kauppi 2 Attendance: 10; Referee: Leo Oksanen

16 March 2024	FC Helmi Jätkä (9)	1–7	FC Kangasala (7)	Tampere
18:00	Lehtilä 87'	Report	Kaivola 30'; Tuomi 34', 63', 65', 83'; Migdal 52'; Luoma 82'	Stadium: Kauppi 3 Attendance: 0 Referee: Eero Tuominen

16 March 2024	Loiske (5)	5–4	EuPa (5)	Valkeakoski
18:00	Viitaharju 23'; J Nieminen 28'; Baliçi 58'; Lehtiö 75'; Molin 90+1'	Report	Leppänen 8'; Kerola 40'; Julin 67', 90+4' (pen.)	Stadium: Palloiluhalli; Attendance: 20; Referee: Petteri Pulkkinen

16 March 2024	Karhu-Futis (7)	1–3	ToVe (6)	Pori
18:30	Ranta 57'	Report	Leppijoki 16'; Koskinen 21'; Somero 45'	Stadium: UK-Tekonurmi; Attendance: 68; Referee: Henrik Grönblom

16 March 2024	LLuja (7)	0–4	Härmä (6)	Eura
20:30		Report	Oksman 21'; Nylund 28'; Roine 40'; Rinne 53'	Stadium: OP-Areena; Attendance: 32; Referee: Vesa Saarinen

17 March 2024	ACE/2 (7)	3–2	TP-49 (5)	Tampere
15:00	Knuuti 22', 80'; Mononen 45'	Report	Laakso 43'; Kinnari 57'	Stadium: Kauppi 2 Attendance: 10; Referee: Juha Kivistö

17 March 2024	Tampere United/3 (8)	3–1	TaPa/2 (8)	Tampere
19:00	Nordström 2'; Vuorinen 7'; Peltonen 90+4'	Report	Heinonen 51'	Stadium: Kauppi 2 Attendance: 10; Referee: Eero Tuominen

17 March 2024	Fish United (7)	5–1	LaVe/KPR (7)	Tampere
19:30	Nieminen 5'; B Laouini 9', 89'; Oksanen 50'; Nykänen 70'	Report	Holushkov 75'	Stadium: Kauppi 3 Attendance: 25; Referee: Mikko Särkiniemi

17 March 2024	LeKi-futis (6)	7–2	TaPa (6)	Valkeakoski
20:00	Vaittinen 8', 24', 30', 44'; Vesamäki 15', 56'; Sohlo 32'	Report	Hartikainen 83', 86'	Stadium: Palloiluhalli; Attendance: 19; Referee: Mikko Lähteenmäki

19 March 2024	FC Haka-j/musta (8)	0–3	Pato (5)	Valkeakoski
21:00		Report	Lehtonen 54'; D Nyman 68'; Vuorio 88'	Stadium: Palloiluhalli; Attendance: 25; Referee: Mikko Lähteenmäki

=== Group 5 ===
17 February 2024	NuPS (5)	2–2 (3–5 p)	TuPS (5)	Nummela
14:00	Helttunen 25'; Athanasiadis 34'; Sonko (yellow card) 7' (yellow-red card) 81'	Report	Halme 41'; Vesala 82'; Westergren (red card) 88'	Stadium: Certos Areena Halli; Attendance: 100; Referee: Antti Munukka

NJS/3 (6)	w/o	NJS/2 (6)
	Report

NouLa (6)	w/o	Akilles (6)
	Report

3 March 2024	Sibbo-Vargarna (6)	0–1	RiPS (5)	Sipoo
18:00		Report	Tiilola 40'	Stadium: Söderkulla; Attendance: 113; Referee: Elmin Salkicevic

15 March 2024	FCFJ (7)	2–3	LoPa (6)	Sipoo
19:00	Vis 52'; Doan 66'	Report	Hirvonen 2', 44'; Ee Reunala 85'	Stadium: Söderkulla; Attendance: 0 Referee: Jarkko Rantanen

16 March 2024	HAlku (6)	3–1	AskU (6)	Järvenpää
13:15	Laurinkoski (red card) 22'; Karjalainen 57'; B Takko 66'; Hynninen 89'	Report	Finne 59'	Stadium: Monitoimihalli; Attendance: 80; Referee: Matti Blom

16 March 2024	TuPS/M35 (+35)	2–2 (4–3 p)	HyPS (5)	Tuusula
14:00	Närhi 47'; J Tiira 62'	Report	66' (o.g.); Seppänen 78'	Stadium: Hyrylä UK; Attendance: 0 Referee: James Clay

16 March 2024	FC Wild (7)	1–2	JäPS/U23 (6)	Järvenpää
16:00	Vuorenmaa 36'	Report	Kihl 17', 68'	Stadium: Monitoimihalli; Attendance: 20; Referee: Mick Grönroos

17 March 2024	ToBK (7)	4–3	KelA (6)	Sipoo
19:00	K Johansson 15'; Augustsson 29'; Eriksson 34'; Carlsson 69'	Report	Gröhn 12', 55'; Halme 37' (pen.)	Stadium: Söderkulla; Attendance: 30; Referee: Jarkko Rantanen

=== Group 6 ===
25 February 2024	FC Kuusysi (5)	6–2	KJP (5)	Lahti
15:00	Utriainen 22'; Sundholm 38'; 41' (o.g.); Heikkonen 45'; S Nordenswan 65'; Eerola 70'	Report	Jegorov 5', 20'	Stadium: Mukkula Halli; Attendance: 70; Referee: Aki Tauriainen

2 March 2024	LAUTP/2 (6)	4–0	FC Loviisa (5)	Lappeenranta
17:45	Liukkonen 23'; Vatanen 25'; Ruokoniemi 90'; Meuronen 90+2'	Report		Stadium: Amis; Attendance: 100; Referee: Juha Vataa

8 March 2024	RPS Lions (6)	1–6	HaPK Edustus (5)	Imatra
19:30	Hirvonen 8'	Report	Pietiläinen 6', 78'; Koivikko 37', 65', 88'; Kolsi 70'	Stadium: Ukonniemi-areena; Attendance: 50; Referee: Miika Pahkala

9 March 2024	STPS Edustus (6)	2–5	Union Plaani (5)	Savonlinna
16:30	Marttinen 37'; Virta 59'	Report	Kuokkanen 1', 25'; Vahekoski 45', 46', 78'	Stadium: Tanhuvaara Halli; Attendance: 30; Referee: Vladislav Dirgin

9 March 2024	LAUTP (5)	1–0	KoPa (5)	Lappeenranta
18:30	J Röyti 16'	Report		Stadium: Amis; Attendance: 125; Referee: Juho Erävuori

9 March 2024	Flamingo United (7)	0–8	Kultsu FC (5)	Lahti
18:45		Report	Huunonen 4', 30', 53'; Pohjankoski 13', 86'; Partanen 21', 44'; Riikonen 59'	Stadium: Mukkula Halli; Attendance: 0 Referee: Pessi Pursiainen

10 March 2024	Nopsa (7)	2–4	Jäntevä (6)	Lahti
18:30	Helenius 7'; O Rainikka 83'	Report	Saikkonen 9', 40'; Laaksonen 12', 90+3'	Stadium: Kisapuisto Stadion; Attendance: 31; Referee: Tommi Kittelä

16 March 2024	Liry (6)	2–3	IPS Edustus (5)	Lappeenranta
12:00	Hammad 8'; Myyryläinen 90+2'	Report	Belimov 3', 56'; Husu 90'	Stadium: Amis; Attendance: 75; Referee: Juho Erävuori

17 March 2024	Jäntevä/Ukot (8)	0–1	SiU (6)	Kotka
14:00		Report	Vehkamaa 89'	Stadium: Arto Tolsa Areena; Attendance: 0 Referee: Turo Veini

17 March 2024	FC Villisiat (8)	1–2	HP-47 (7)	Kouvola
16:30	Pulkki 35'	Report	Moilanen 53'; Sobko 56'	Stadium: Lehtomäki; Attendance: 20; Referee: Tuomas Karhu

17 March 2024	PoPo (8)	6–0	Kumu (6)	Kotka
17:00	Nykänen 7', 17', 58'; Laitinen 45' (pen.), 63'; Huusari 90'	Report		Stadium: Urheiluhalli; Attendance: 0 Referee: Atte Henriksson

=== Group 7 ===
1 March 2024	Huima/Urho (5)	2–2 (8–7 p)	NiemU (5)	Äänekoski
19:00	Honkonen 52'; Hac 61'	Report	Helin 7'; Laukkanen 55'	Stadium: Ylipainehalli; Attendance: 80; Referee: Hassan Soltani

2 March 2024	PaRi (6)	4–2	OuPa (6)	Jyväskylä
18:00	Hämäläinen 29'; Hautanen 38', 85'; Pesonen 52'	Report	Klimov 6'; Hakala 51'; Forsman (red card) 78'	Stadium: Vehkahalli; Attendance: 77; Referee: Kalle Ruokamo

3 March 2024	ViPa/2 (6)	2–3	FC Marski (6)	Äänekoski
19:00	Saarinen 29'; Kaistinen 36'	Report	Niemi 2', 82'; Sundström 68'	Stadium: Ylipainehalli; Attendance: 15; Referee: Juha Rantanen

10 March 2024	SaPa (6)	0–7	LehPa (5)	Joensuu
18:15		Report	8', 90+2' (o.g.); Sottinen 11'; Juurinen 14'; Niemi 26'; Tahvanainen 76'; Anttilainen 82'	Stadium: Hope Areena; Attendance: 49; Referee: Jooa Itämäki

13 March 2024	Komeetat (5)	0–4	ViPa (5)	Jyväskylä
19:15		Report	Halttunen 25', 48'; Sumanen 55'; M Karjalainen 67'	Stadium: Vehkahalli; Attendance: 135; Referee: Vilho Jokinen

13 March 2024	Yllätys (5)	1–3	MP/2 (5)	Joensuu
20:40	R Karjalainen (red card) 64'; Vihavainen 85'	Report	O Torniainen 65'; V Nikulainen 78'; T Nikulainen 89'	Stadium: Hope Areena; Referee: Vladislav Dirgin

15 March 2024	Komeetat/3 (7)	0–5	KeuPa (5)	Jyväskylä
20:15		Report	Mahlamäki 20'; Karera 31'; Adebayo 62', 88'; Nadinic 86'	Stadium: Vehkahalli; Attendance: 20; Referee: Waltteri Lummi

16 March 2024	Komeetat/Piuku (8)	0–5	MiPK (5)	Jyväskylä
10:30		Report	Haikonen 11', 21'; Väisänen 26'; Korvenpää 75'; Dos Santos Oliveira 85'	Stadium: Vehkahalli; Attendance: 100; Referee: Riki Yari

16 March 2024	MuurY (7)	7–0	FC Soho (6)	Jyväskylä
13:00	Lehtinen 15'; Pietarinen 24'; Björn 25', 53', 75'; Mehto 66'; Norontaus 79'	Report	Spätgens (yellow card) 68' (yellow-red card) 70'	Stadium: Vehkahalli; Attendance: 50; Referee: Eetu Koski

17 March 2024	LuoVu (7)	0–8	Rangers (5)	Jyväskylä
14:00		Report	Roponen 8'; Kohonen 13' (pen.); T Korhonen 16', 24'; Laaksonen 28', 31'; Matilainen 84', 90+6'	Stadium: Vehkahalli; Attendance: 55; Referee: Mikko Lehtola

=== Group 8 ===
23 February 2024	KaPa (5)	2–0	KajHa (5)	Kajaani
19:00	Trindade De Moura 13', 47'	Report		Stadium: Pallohalli; Attendance: 178; Referee: Jorik Hoxha

10 March 2024	Raiku (7)	0–6	FC Tarzan (7)	Kuopio
16:00		Report	Raatikainen 18'; M Kyttä 25'; R Eskelinen 53'; Ekonsalo 61', 79'; Pekkarinen 82'	Stadium: Lippumäki Ylipainehalli; Attendance: 50; Referee: Niki Berg

15 March 2024	ToU (5)	3–5	PK-37 (5)	Kuopio
20:00	Kovalainen 35', 51'; Miilunpohja 56'	Report	Ronkainen 5'; K Kääriäinen 25'; Niskanen 45'; Joseph 62'; Montalto 86'	Stadium: Lippumäki Ylipainehalli; Attendance: 25; Referee: Panu Leppä

=== Group 9 ===
24 February 2024	Karhu (7)	3–2	IK (6)	Närpes
14:30	Ventelä 86'; Rantanen 90+3'; Lahola 90+5'	Report	Tu Ala-Ranta 46'; Aat Metsä-Ketelä 56'	Stadium: Bollhallen; Attendance: 0 Referee: Nicholas Westerholm

2 March 2024	SJK-j (6)	0–2	Sisu (6)	Seinäjoki
19:00	Koski (yellow card) 75' (yellow-red card) 90+4'	Report	Wachira 18'; Kulmala 28'	Stadium: WallSport-Areena; Attendance: 0 Referee: Konsta Jylhä

5 March 2024	SJK-j Apollo (8)	1–3	Virkiä (6)	Seinäjoki
21:00	Muurimäki 27'	Report	J Rajala 21'; Koski 61'; 62' (o.g.)	Stadium: WallSport-Areena; Attendance: 110; Referee: Juha Heinström

7 March 2024	Sääripotku (5)	1–1 (3–4 p)	FC Kiisto (5)	Kokkola
20:45	Takkunen 14'	Report	Assila 89'	Stadium: Kipparihall; Attendance: 75; Referee: Janne Vehniä

9 March 2024	Kaskö IK (6)	1–2	Sporting Kristina (5)	Närpes
17:00	Mujkic 3'	Report	82' (o.g.); Mäki 90'	Stadium: Bollhallen; Attendance: 125; Referee: Edin Halilcevic

9 March 2024	APV (7)	0–5	SIF (5)	Kuortane
17:30		Report	Snellman 16'; Kankaanpää 42', 52'; Al Mohammadi 53'; Birhane 90+3'	Stadium: Ilkka-Areena; Attendance: 40; Referee: Konsta Jylhä

10 March 2024	Laihia United FC (8)	0–9	KPS (6)	Kokkola
20:45		Report	Kangasvieri 6', 8', 11', 44'; Välisaari 36'; Hinkkanen 55'; Laitinen 66'; Bweasay 69'; Laxström 77'	Stadium: Kipparihall; Attendance: 0 Referee: Mikko Ojala

13 March 2024	BK-48/2 (7)	1–1 (2–3 p)	Norrvalla FF (6)	Vaasa
21:00	Hiekkanen 5'	Report	Bui 24'	Stadium: Veo Arena; Attendance: 129; Referee: Marcus Beijar

=== Group 10 ===
17 February 2024	KTU (6)	6–3	HauPa/2 (6)	Oulu
12:30	Pääkkölä 28'; Leskelä 38'; Mäkiharju 48'; Asikainen 48'; Yli-Hollo 54'; Lauri 87'	Report	Haapa-Aho 16'; Mansikkamäki 64'; Ukkola 90+3'	Stadium: Heinäpää PH; Attendance: 75; Referee: Aaro Laurila

18 February 2024	Roi Utd (5)	3–0	Villan Pojat (5)	Rovaniemi
13:00	Hakala 12'; Ronkainen 49'; Ojaniemi 83'	Report		Stadium: Ounashalli; Attendance: 30; Referee: Mikko Rantala

25 February 2024	Puleward City (7)	1–6	PonPa (5)	Oulu
16:00	Acosta 80'	Report	Lyttinen 6', 34'; Herva 8', 37'; Livingstone 58', 66'	Stadium: Heinäpää PH; Attendance: 50; Referee: Jere Holappa

25 February 2024	Ajax (6)	0–3	Tervarit-j (6)	Kempele
20:30		Report	Haapalainen 24'; Säkkinen 57'; Keinänen 79'	Stadium: Kempele Areena; Attendance: 58; Referee: Satu Miettunen

2 March 2024	Heinäpään Hanhet -24 (7)	2–2 (2–3 p)	RoPo (5)	Oulu
16:00	Raappana 30'; Laguerre 90+1'	Report	Pesonen 4'; Salmirinne 71'	Stadium: Heinäpää PH; Attendance: 20; Referee: Aleksi-Matias Kaarela

10 March 2024	OuJK (7)	2–2 (2–3 p)	HauPa (5)	Oulu
13:00	Ulander 22'; Rimpinen 45+2'	Report	Körkkö 85'; Kotila 90+1'	Stadium: Heinäpää PH; Attendance: 50; Referee: Timi Kärki

23 March 2024	FC SCJ (6)	2–3	KePS (5)	Rovaniemi
19:30	Aa Pähti 14'; Abuhamda 45'	Report	Paavilainen 11', 77'; Kreivi 31'	Stadium: Ounashalli; Attendance: 150; Referee: Ville Moilanen
Note: The match was replayed after protest by FC SCJ. The original match was ended on 15 March, in a 4–2 victory for KePS

== Round 2 ==
The draw was made on 5 March 2024 on the Football Association's (Palloliito) YouTube channel. 120 winners from Round 1 participate in this round. Winners advance to Round 3.

Number of teams per tier still in competition
Veikkausliiga (1)	Ykkösliiga (2)	Ykkönen (3)	Kakkonen (4)	Kolmonen (5)	Nelonen (6)	Vitonen (7)	Kutonen (8)	Seiska (9)	M35/M40 (+35, +40)	Total
12 / 12	10 / 10	10 / 10	22 / 22	55 / 82	42 / 77	16 / 86	3 / 49	0 / 10	4 / 6	174 / 364

=== Group 1 ===
26 March 2024	Tikka (6)	2–0	Kilo IF (7)	Espoo
20:00	Salgado Ismodes 72', 90+7'	Report		Stadium: Espoonlahti 2 Attendance: 30; Referee: Gezim Arifi

28 March 2024	Valtti/2 (6)	0–7	Atlantis FC/PM (5)	Puotila
20:10		Report	Brown 9'; Söderlund 31'; Masuko 38'; Sfishta 50' (pen.); Souza da Penha Filho 77'; Simon 82'; Ajunwoko 89'	Stadium: Puotila; Attendance: 0 Referee: Sami Kekäläinen

28 March 2024	PuiU (5)	2–1	Valtti (5)	Helsinki
20:30	Biga 40'; Kolesnik 80'	Report	Oris 45+6'; Goran (yellow card) 25' (yellow-red card) 73'; Lehto (red card) 90+7'	Stadium: Mosan Wembley; Attendance: 0 Referee: Gezim Arifi

2 April 2024	HPS (5)	0–2	MPS/Atletico Malmi (5)	Helsinki
19:00		Report	36' (o.g.); 48' (o.g.)	Stadium: Töölö PK 1 Attendance: 44; Referee: Lassi Matilainen

2 April 2024	EsPa (5)	4–1	Vesa (6)	Espoo
20:00	Roivainen 7'; Virkkunen 47'; L Lehtinen 55'; Boshnjaku 79'	Report	Nieminen 24'	Stadium: Matinkylä 1 Attendance: 12; Referee: Mats Helkamo

4 April 2024	NuPS/2 (6)	6–0	KoiPS (6)	Nummela
20:00	Timmerbacka 28'; Lehikoinen 45+12'; Olin 53'; Je Niemi 68', 71'; Tidenberg 85'	Report		Stadium: Certos Areena Halli; Attendance: 100; Referee: Gezim Arifi

5 April 2024	TiPS (5)	1–2	LPS (5)	Vantaa
19:30	Jrad 51'; Ceni (red card) 76'	Report	Rihtniemi 45'; Laitila 48'	Stadium: Tikkurila; Attendance: 0 Referee: James Clay

6 April 2024	FC Kontu (5)	4–0	HIFK/2 (5)	Helsinki
13:00	Lehtimäki 3', 17'; J Tukiainen 53'; Kaipio 73'	Report		Stadium: Tali halli Attendance: 500; Referee: Gezim Arifi

6 April 2024	Pöxyt/TNT (6)	2–0	PPJ/Ruoholahti (5)	Espoo
16:00	Virta 27', 44'	Report		Stadium: Laaksolahti; Attendance: 0 Referee: Daniel Saarela

6 April 2024	ToTe/Akatemia (6)	0–3	Töölön Taisto (5)	Helsinki
17:00		Report	Kyläheiko 45+1'; Viisainen 82'; Neuvonen 85'	Stadium: Tali halli Attendance: 100; Referee: Matias Marjander

6 April 2024	FC POHU/KY United (7)	5–1	Pöxyt/M35 (+35)	Helsinki
19:30	Lepistö 9'; Torkki 43', 86'; Lahikainen 89'; Kivimäki 90'	Report	84' (o.g.)	Stadium: Töölö PK 6 Attendance: 30; Referee: Otso Simola

6 April 2024	FC Finnkurd (5)	3–0	HJK/Kantsu (6)	Helsinki
19:30	Tolharenko 53'; Bernal 61', 87'	Report		Stadium: Töölö PK 1 Attendance: 30; Referee: Erdal Karsandi

7 April 2024	Etu-Töölön Urhot (6)	1–2	EsPa/Renat (6)	Helsinki
17:00	Kaijasilta 77'	Report	Niva 13'; Kivaniemi 25'	Stadium: Töölö PK 6 Attendance: 30; Referee: Mikko Lipsanen

7 April 2024	Millbrook FC (7)	2–2 (4–2 p)	Chicken Wings (7)	Helsinki
17:00	K Kastrati 39' (pen.), 63'; Ahmed-Kassen (red card) 69'	Report	Jurvanen 24', 32'; Tuomainen (red card) 49'; Komisarov (yellow card) 32' (yellow-red card) 58'	Stadium: Töölö PK 1 Attendance: 50; Referee: Erdal Karsandi

7 April 2024	LePa (6)	2–1	SUMU/sob (6)	Espoo
18:30	Pelkonen 38'; Hakola 71'	Report	Naeemi 90+6'	Stadium: Leppävaara 2 Attendance: 30; Referee: Otto Helin

7 April 2024	FC Germania (6)	2–3	PPS/Old Stars (6)	Helsinki
19:00	Guillaume 16'; Satilmis 45'	Report	Heikkinen 26'; Salmela 30'; Laukkarinen 67'	Stadium: Töölö PK 6 Attendance: 0 Referee: Elmo Otronen

7 April 2024	Polin Pallo (7)	4–0	KoiPS/Dynamo (7)	Espoo
19:00	Halonen 1', 18'; Simpson 52'; Huhtamäki 85'	Report		Stadium: Säterinniitty; Attendance: 20; Referee: Olli Jantunen

7 April 2024	FC POHU/Hurjin (6)	3–1	HPS/2 (6)	Helsinki
19:00	Stergakis 6'; Kilpeläinen 22'; Taanila 31'	Report	Haapaniemi 87'	Stadium: Töölö PK 1 Attendance: 25; Referee: Joel Chydenius

7 April 2024	Gnistan/M35 (+35)	7–2	KäPa/2 (6)	Helsinki
20:00	Sihvola 37', 39', 49', 70', 75'; Häyrynen 58'; Markkanen 76'	Report	Repo 18'; Laitinen 20'	Stadium: Oulunkylä 1 Attendance: 2353; Referee: Dennis Antamo

8 April 2024	StaPa De Royale (8)	1–2	EPS/Reservi (5)	Helsinki
19:15	T Purme 18'; Oinonen (red card) 90+5'	Report	Naarvala-De Freitas 41' (pen.); Paintola 90+2'	Stadium: Töölö PK 1 Attendance: 50; Referee: Gezim Arifi

8 April 2024	FC POHU (6)	0–5	FC Kirkkonummi (5)	Helsinki
19:30	Hosaini (yellow card) 34' (yellow-red card) 78'	Report	Kuparinen 18'; Nevala 43'; Nylund 52', 80'; Granlund 73'	Stadium: Tali halli Attendance: 45; Referee: Adrijan Demirovic

11 April 2024	HooGee (5)	4–8	VJS/2 (5)	Espoo
20:15	Johannson 7'; S Langhoff 22'; D Langhoff 40'; Wassell 45+5'	Report	Kainulainen 15', 50', 74'; Olvinen 45+1', 57'; Laitila 61'; Sormunen 71', 77'	Stadium: Matinkylä 2 Attendance: 114; Referee: Gezim Arifi

=== Group 2 ===
22 March 2024	VG-62 (5)	3–2	PIF (5)	Naantali
19:45	Nurmi 18'; Mikkonen 21'; Viitanen 70'	Report	Nevä 13'; Laine 61'	Stadium: Karvetti; Attendance: 100; Referee: Vili Lehtovaara

28 March 2024	TPS/M35 (+35)	2–1	KuuLa (7)	Turku
20:10	Hakala 33'; Hyyrynen 69'	Report	Iljin 90+4'	Stadium: Kupittaa 5 Attendance: 0 Referee: Niilo Heikkinen

29 March 2024	FC RP (7)	0–2	Masku (5)	Rusko
15:00		Report	Heimola 45', 71'	Stadium: Rusko; Attendance: 100; Referee: Vili Lehtovaara

1 April 2024	TuWe (6)	2–1	Härmä (6)	Turku
13:00	Pllana 66'; Korbelainen 88'	Report	Rinne 21'	Stadium: Kupittaa 5 Attendance: 0 Referee: Niilo Heikkinen

2 April 2024	FC HIK (6)	0–6	KaaPo (5)	Hanko
19:00		Report	Humalamäki 30', 44'; Salminen 43'; Talvitie 59'; Valli 85'; Kaarela 89'	Stadium: Rukki 1 Attendance: 60; Referee: Dennis Antamo

3 April 2024	PiPS (6)	0–2	EIF/Akademi (5)	Piikkiö
19:30		Report	T Ryhänen 61' (pen.); Lynch 84'	Stadium: POP-Areena; Attendance: 45; Referee: Petri Johansson

=== Group 3 ===
24 March 2024	FC Kangasala (7)	2–3	Tampere United/2 (5)	Tampere
20:00	O Niemi 8'; M Al-Tallab 47'	Report	Hätönen 35'; Väliaho 81'; Korpinen 84'	Stadium: Pirkkahalli C

27 March 2024	Fish United (7)	4–1	LeKi-futis (6)	Tampere
19:45	Palohuhta 51', 53', 70'; B Laouini 90+3'	Report	Vaittinen 38'; Haapasaari (red card) 82'	Stadium: Kauppi 3 Attendance: 36; Referee: Mikko Särkiniemi

27 March 2024	Tampere United/3 (8)	1–6	NoPS 2 (6)	Tampere
20:00	Nordström 20'	Report	Pellas 2', 10'; Eskelinen 45'; Sarvala 51'; 67' (o.g.); Alizadeh 86'	Stadium: Kauppi 2 Attendance: 20; Referee: Petteri Pulkkinen

27 March 2024	NoPS (5)	7–0	PP-70 (5)	Nokia
20:30	Valkama 14', 73'; Äijälä 24'; Ala-Hakuni 43'; Hakari 58', 89'; Paavola 68'		Pukkila (red card) 45'; Chalhoub (red card) 45'	Stadium: Menkala; Attendance: 35; Referee: Aapo Kyllönen

1 April 2024	MuSa (5)	8–0	Loiske (5)	Pori
19:30	Santos 23'; Akinpelu 32'; Georgiev 39', 44'; Simeon 41'; Hietava 51'; Männistö 73', 86'	Report		Stadium: UK-Tekonurmi; Attendance: 124; Referee: Henrik Grönblom

3 April 2024	ToVe (6)	5–1	Pato (5)	Pori
20:00	Malmivuori 12', 33'; Somero 19'; Koskinen 36'; Marttila 76'	Report	Vuorio 65'	Stadium: UK-Tekonurmi; Attendance: 37; Referee: Henrik Grönblom

4 April 2024	ACE/2 (7)	1–1 (4–5 p)	VaKP (6)	Tampere
20:00	Mononen 78'	Report	Stenman 32'	Stadium: Kauppi 3 Attendance: 5 Referee: Henrik Sandmark

5 April 2024	FC Haka j. (5)	4–2	Ylöjärvi United FC (5)	Valkeakoski
18:00	Kittilä 5'; Rautio 22', 57'; Salminen 81'	Report	Kiikkinen 25'; Kotti 73'	Stadium: Tehtaan kenttä Attendance: 73; Referee: Mikko Särkiniemi

=== Group 4 ===
23 March 2024	JäPS/U23 (6)	1–3	FC Kuusysi (5)	Järvenpää
15:00	Saastamoinen 89'	Report	Eerola 16' (pen.); Heikkonen 44', 62'	Stadium: Monitoimihalli; Attendance: 20; Referee: Paul Kirsch

1 April 2024	HAlku (6)	1–3	NJS/3 (6)	Järvenpää
13:15	J Takko 86'	Report	Aittasalmi 14', 35'; Vainikainen 52'	Stadium: Monitoimihalli; Attendance: 0 Referee: Joni Juntto

2 April 2024	Akilles (6)	0–2	RiPS (5)	Porvoo
20:15		Report	Dyster 14' (pen.), 81'	Stadium: Pallokenttä; Attendance: 0 Referee: Sami Kekäläinen

4 April 2024	TuPS/M35 (+35)	2–4	LoPa (6)	Tuusula
20:30	Fihlman 19'; Ristolainen 67'	Report	Mendy 30'; Hirvonen 45', 50'; Perny 74'	Stadium: Hyrylä UK; Attendance: 0 Referee: Dennis Antamo

7 April 2024	ToBK (7)	0–3	TuPS (5)	Sipoo
19:00		Report	Ma Nevalainen 40', 77'; Mi Nevalainen 51'	Stadium: Söderkulla; Attendance: 20; Referee: Miika Forsblom

=== Group 5 ===
22 March 2024	Kultsu FC (5)	4–2	Union Plaani (5)	Lappeenranta
19:00	Partanen 20', 37'; Lindgren 53'; Tielinen 77'	Report	Kuzniarek 2'; Vahekoski 81'; Olli Tynkkynen (red card) 90+2'	Stadium: Amis; Attendance: 30; Referee: Miika Pahkala

27 March 2024	PoPo (8)	7–1	HP-47 (7)	Kotka
19:00	Nykänen 14', 31', 48'; Laitinen 59' (pen.); Lauretsalo 65'; Rikberg 72'; S Huttunen 85'	Report	Lehtinen 40'; Kirillov (red card) 77'	Stadium: Urheiluhalli; Attendance: 0 Referee: Erik Pakkala

27 March 2024	HaPK Edustus (5)	1–2	IPS Edustus (5)	Kotka
19:00	Pietiläinen 27' (yellow card) 84' (red card) 90+7'; Atte Viersola (yellow card) 70' (red card) 90+7'	Report	Tiilikainen 14' (yellow card) 82' (yellow-red card) 90'; Pesonen 86'	Stadium: Arto Tolsa Areena; Attendance: 213; Referee: Saku Metsämuuronen

1 April 2024	SiU (6)	2–0	Jäntevä (6)	Simpele
16:00	El Terävä 7'; J Saukkonen 77'	Report		Stadium: Keskuskenttä; Attendance: 90; Referee: Miika Pahkala

3 April 2024	LAUTP/2 (6)	1–4	LAUTP (5)	Lappeenranta
19:15	Liukkonen 59'	Report	Lötjönen 14', 72'; Kiwan 63'; Räisänen 65'	Stadium: Amis; Attendance: 80; Referee: Remi Rantakaulio

=== Group 6 ===
23 March 2024	MuurY (7)	1–3	Rangers (5)	Jyväskylä
20:45	Norontaus 55'	Report	Eloranta 28'; Laaksonen 69'; Abahassine 83'	Stadium: Vehkahalli; Attendance: 50; Referee: Mikko Lehtola

24 March 2024	PaRi (6)	0–8	MiPK (5)	Jyväskylä
20:00		Report	Ar Hotokka 6', 55' (pen.), 58'; Brusilovskii 31'; K Korvenpää 33'; Dos Santos Oliveira 41', 52'; Tielinen 60'	Stadium: Vehkahalli; Attendance: 67; Referee: Vili Viinikainen

25 March 2024	FC Tarzan (7)	1–3	ViPa (5)	Kuopio
19:30	Vänskä 59'	Report	Paananen 33'; Halttunen 37'; Ylönen 64'	Stadium: Lippumäki Ylipainehalli; Attendance: 64; Referee: Eeli Törnroos

28 March 2024	LehPa (5)	1–3	MP/2 (5)	Joensuu
19:45	Niemi 79' (pen.)	Report	O Torniainen 45'; A Karttunen 52'; Häyhänen 85'	Stadium: Hope Areena; Attendance: 60; Referee: Vladislav Dirgin

28 March 2024	KeuPa (5)	3–0	Huima/Urho (5)	Äänekoski
20:00	39' (o.g.); Adebayo 84'; Nadinic 86'	Report		Stadium: Ylipainehalli; Attendance: 200; Referee: Hassan Soltani

6 April 2024	FC Marski (6)	1–7	PK-37 (5)	Mikkeli
19:50	Niemi 24'	Report	Rissanen 10', 39', 68'; Ronkainen 64'; Montalto 69', 86'; R Lappalainen 77'	Stadium: Mikkelin-jp-halli; Attendance: 35; Referee: Ilkka Mäkelä

=== Group 7 ===
18 March 2024	Virkiä (6)	3–1	Norrvalla FF (6)	Kuortane
20:00	Valkama 1'; Koski 27'; J Rajala 71'	Report	Mbaya 29'	Stadium: Ilkka-Areena; Attendance: 50; Referee: Arttu Rahko

24 March 2024	KPS (6)	1–7	Sporting Kristina (5)	Kokkola
17:20	Välisaari 16'	Report	Ryhol 9'; Kettle 15'; Miranda 19'; Sifet 22', 61'; Malonga 44'; Zlazikov 64'	Stadium: Kipparihall; Attendance: 100; Referee: Pasi Tuurinmaa

27 March 2024	Sisu (6)	0–3	FC Kiisto (5)	Seinäjoki
19:30		Report	Assila 18'; Vedenjuoksu 69', 86'	Stadium: OmaSP Stadion; Attendance: 154; Referee: Arttu Rahko

30 March 2024	SIF (5)	1–0	Karhu (7)	Kristinestad
12:30	Peth 55'; Marjamäki (yellow card) 83' (yellow-red card) 90'	Report		Stadium: Braheplan; Attendance: 60; Referee: Mikko Juusola

=== Group 8 ===
16 March 2024	KaPa (5)	3–0	PonPa (5)	Kajaani
14:00	Nurkkala 13'; J Puolakanaho 51'; Trindade De Moura 63'	Report		Stadium: Pallohalli; Attendance: 92; Referee: Pietu Niinimäki

24 March 2024	HauPa (5)	2–4	Roi Utd (5)	Oulu
13:30	L Syrjälä 23'; Ervasti 25'	Report	L Ahola 54'; Ronkainen 63'; Paukku 69'; Ojaniemi 87'	Stadium: Heinäpää PH; Attendance: 51; Referee: Timi Kärki

24 March 2024	KTU (6)	0–6	RoPo (5)	Oulu
16:00		Report	Luiro 37', 53', 72', 74'; Pesonen 67'; Kutila 88'	Stadium: Heinäpää PH; Attendance: 40; Referee: Satu Miettunen

27 March 2024	Tervarit-j (6)	0–1	KePS (5)	Oulu
19:00		Report	Paavilainen 4'	Stadium: Heinäpää PH; Attendance: 75; Referee: Tatu Korkalainen

== Round 3 ==
The draw was made on 3 April 2024 on the Football Association's (Palloliito) YouTube channel. 60 winners from Round 1 + 48 new entrants (6 Veikkausliiga teams; all 10 teams from newly-created tier 2 in 2024, Ykkösliiga; all registered teams from Ykkönen and Kakkonen, which dropped down one level in Finnish football league system) are participate in this round. Winners advance to Round 4.

Number of teams per tier still in competition
Veikkausliiga (1)	Ykkösliiga (2)	Ykkönen (3)	Kakkonen (4)	Kolmonen (5)	Nelonen (6)	Vitonen (7)	Kutonen (8)	Seiska (9)	M35/M40 (+35, +40)	Total
12 / 12	10 / 10	10 / 10	22 / 22	38 / 82	15 / 77	4 / 86	1 / 49	0 / 10	2 / 6	114 / 364

=== Group 1 ===
15 April 2024	Atlantis FC/PM (5)	0–3; Awarded	NJS (4)	Helsinki
20:00	Pinto 48', 74'	Report	Ryhänen 83'	Stadium: Kartano 1 Attendance: 120; Referee: Fazli Suka

15 April 2024	Tikka (6)	0–2	PuiU (5)	Espoo
20:10		Report	Ruumensaari 45+5'; Lamppu 62'	Stadium: Espoonlahti 2 Attendance: 70; Referee: Joni Taipale

16 April 2024	FC Kiffen (4)	0–1	PPJ (4)	Helsinki
18:00		Report	Sjölund 90'	Stadium: Töölö PK 1 Attendance: 89; Referee: Valentin Smirnov

16 April 2024	RiPS (5)	0–5	IFK Mariehamn (1)	Riihimäki
18:30		Report	Okereke 52'; Ojala 64' (pen.); Sallinen 68'; Nuñez 71'; dos Santos Cardoso 83'	Stadium: Keskuskenttä; Attendance: 877; Referee: Joona Manninen

16 April 2024	LAUTP (5)	1–2	JäPS (2)	Lappeenranta
18:30	M Röyti 6'	Report	Holopainen 9'; Arminen 30'	Stadium: Lauritsala UK; Attendance: 230; Referee: Remi Rantakaulio

16 April 2024	LePa (6)	1–3	EPS (3)	Espoo
19:30	E Hirvonen 64'	Report	Kiiski 9'; Kontio 75' (o.g.); Amehri 80' (pen.)	Stadium: Leppävaara 2 Attendance: 150; Referee: Dennis Antamo

16 April 2024	MPS/Atletico Malmi (5)	0–2	PK-35 (2)	Helsinki
20:00		Report	Lassoued 76'; Manneh 84'	Stadium: Mosan Wembley; Attendance: 140; Referee: Juuso Vuorinen

16 April 2024	FC POHU/KY United (7)	0–7	KäPa (2)	Helsinki
20:00		Report	Nurmi 14'; Auranen 18'; Lika 21'; Sivonen 69'; Heikurinen 71'; Haapiainen 74'; Tammivuori 77'	Stadium: Töölö PK 1 Attendance: 80; Referee: Oskari Tuomi

16 April 2024	EsPa (5)	0–1	FC Honka (4)	Espoo
20:00		Report	Simonov 46'	Stadium: Matinkylä 1 Attendance: 328; Referee: Ibrahim Aksoy

16 April 2024	SexyPöxyt (4)	0–2	VJS (4)	Espoo
20:00		Report	Nurmi 34', 47'	Stadium: Laaksolahti; Attendance: 113; Referee: Antti Kolehmainen

16 April 2024	EBK (4)	4–2	FC Futura (4)	Espoo
20:00	Ojala 20', 39'; Mehmeti 61', 75'	Report	Britschgi 37', 68'	Stadium: Keski-Espoo 1 Attendance: 210; Referee: Amir Hajizadeh

16 April 2024	Atlantis FC (3)	6–0	EsPa/Renat (6)	Helsinki
20:00	Severino 12'; Mansaray 29'; Souza De Almeida 55'; Mehmeti 70'; Abubakar 80'; Katashira 86'	Report		Stadium: Latokartano; Attendance: 40; Referee: Jesse Aalto

16 April 2024	FC Finnkurd (5)	1–4	TuPS (5)	Helsinki
20:00	Tolharenko 19'	Report	14' (o.g.); Mankin 45+2'; Puusaari 87'; Turnbull-Smith 90'; Puljujärvi (red card) 90+2'	Stadium: Kartano 2 Attendance: 0 Referee: Jasmine Kaur

16 April 2024	Gnistan/M35 (+35)	1–5	JäPS/47 (4)	Helsinki
20:10	Saari 84'	Report	Pohjantähti 29', 32' (pen.); N Manner 62'; Sivunen 63'; Dits 87'	Stadium: Oulunkylä 2 Attendance: 52; Referee: Gezim Arifi

16 April 2024	VJS/2 (5)	1–8	Gnistan (1)	Myyrmäki
20:15	Fors 59'	Report	B Tatar 32', 71'; Yli-Hietanen 50', 67'; Liikonen 52', 75' (pen.); Pyyskänen 69'; Heiskanen 87'	Stadium: Jalkapallostadion; Attendance: 0 Referee: Joona Kontinen

19 April 2024	PoPo (8)	0–4	Pöxyt/TNT (6)	Kotka
19:30		Report	Virta 23'; Beilinson 45', 64'; Jäppinen 86'	Stadium: Urheiluhalli; Attendance: 40; Referee: Alexander Makarov

21 April 2024	FC POHU/Hurjin (6)	0–6	LoPa (6)	Helsinki
19:00		Report	Perny 8', 55'; Lemberg 13', 89'; Gusev 67'; Mela 88'	Stadium: Pirkkola; Attendance: 35; Referee: Kim Junna

21 April 2024	Millbrook FC (7)	1–5	NJS/3 (6)	Helsinki
20:00	Jaba 41'	Report	Murto 20'; Sinkkonen 50'; Murtomaa 70'; Vainikainen 74'; Harjunpää 85'	Stadium: Pallomylly; Attendance: 0 Referee: Matias Marjander

23 April 2024	NuPS/2 (6)	0–3; Awarded	PPS/Old Stars (6)	Nummela
20:00	Kajeniemi 54', 57'	Report	Hyppölä 6'	Stadium: Certos Areena Halli; Attendance: 0 Referee: Joel Chydenius

24 April 2024	FC Kirkkonummi (5)	0–4	PKKU (3)	Masala
19:30		Report	Musa 38'; Nylund 62' (o.g.); Virtanen 82'; Lindholm 90+2'	Stadium: Urheilupuisto; Attendance: 120; Referee: Gezim Arifi

24 April 2024	LPS (5)	4–0	EPS/Reservi (5)	Helsinki
20:10	Riikonen 48', 83'; Martikainen 54' (pen.); Laitila 64'	Report		Stadium: Saari Areena; Attendance: 190; Referee: Jesse Aalto

28 April 2024	FC Kuusysi (5)	3–1	EIF/Akademi (5)	Lahti
17:30	Kämäräinen 3'; Utriainen 29' (pen.); Varjovirta 44'	Report	T Ryhänen 15'	Stadium: Kisapuisto Stadion; Attendance: 50; Referee: Anssi Juurinen

28 April 2024	Polin Pallo (7)	1–5	Töölön Taisto (5)	Espoo
19:00	Halonen 35'	Report	S Klinga 6'; Keränen 31', 39', 74'; Hyvönen 87'	Stadium: Säterinniitty; Attendance: 30; Referee: Dennis Antamo

29 April 2024	FC Kontu (5)	0–0 (3–4 p)	GrIFK (4)	Helsinki
20:00	Ruismäki (yellow card) 22' (yellow-red card) 38'	Report		Stadium: Kontula; Attendance: 150; Referee: Olli Jantunen

=== Group 2 ===
16 April 2024	Tampere United/2 (5)	0–11	EIF (1)	Tampere
18:00		Report	Vehkonen 10'; Leksell 29', 45'; Fagerström 38'; Lehtonen 40'; Björklund 52'; Pietsalo 69'; Lundström 71', 77', 80'; Efimov 83' (pen.)	Stadium: Pyynikin urheilukenttä Attendance: 223; Referee: Juho Nieminen

16 April 2024	Masku (5)	0–2	SalPa (2)	Masku
18:30		Report	Haruna 18', 51'	Stadium: Taponketo; Attendance: 140; Referee: Samuli Stenman

16 April 2024	TPS/M35 (+35)	2–3	Ilves/2 (4)	Turku
19:15	Hyyrynen 18'; Hämäläinen 79'	Report	Väisänen 4', 6', 14'	Stadium: Kupittaa 2 Attendance: 40; Referee: Aleksi Keronen

16 April 2024	KaaPo (5)	0–4	TPS (2)	Kaarina
19:30		Report	Helén 76', 84', 90+1' (pen.); Muhamed 80'	Stadium: Puuha-areena; Attendance: 473; Referee: Jesse Salo

17 April 2024	VG-62 (5)	1–3	FC Jazz (3)	Naantali
18:30	Maanpää 81'	Report	Ushiyama 7'; Campagna 70'; Tanaka 90+5'	Stadium: Karvetti; Attendance: 150; Referee: Vili Lehtovaara

17 April 2024	Tampere United (4)	0–0 (2–4 p)	FC Inter 2 (4)	Tampere
19:00		Report		Stadium: Tammelan stadion Attendance: 397; Referee: Kalle Mäkinen

18 April 2024	NoPS (5)	1–3	P-Iirot (4)	Nokia
20:15	Ala-Hakuni 21'	Report	Pohtio 27', 69'; Salonen 57'	Stadium: Menkala; Attendance: 102; Referee: Niklas Helenius

24 April 2024	ToVe (6)	2–3	FC Haka j. (5)	Pori
20:00	Tuovinen 28'; Huppunen 88'	Report	Savijoki 11'; Mattila 23'; Kittilä 27'	Stadium: UK-Tekonurmi; Attendance: 57; Referee: Petri Viljanen

25 April 2024	NoPS 2 (6)	1–3	VaKP (6)	Nokia
20:15	Sarvala 82'	Report	Rautanen 32'; Tenkanen 79'; Uusikartano 90+2'	Stadium: Menkala; Attendance: 3 Referee: Pekka Nuppola

26 April 2024	TuWe (6)	0–10	MuSa (5)	Turku
19:00		Report	Simeon 6', 32'; Hietava 14' (pen.); Adeleke 26', 41'; Akinpelu 59', 71', 79'; Marttila 73'; Laitinen 89'	Stadium: Raunistula; Attendance: 0 Referee: Onni-Kalle Ojanen

26 April 2024	Fish United (7)	1–3	TPV (4)	Tampere
19:45	Palohuhta 7'	Report	Kujala 5', 68' (pen.); Kostiainen 56'	Stadium: Kauppi 3 Attendance: 137; Referee: Lauri Luomala

=== Group 3 ===
16 April 2024	JIPPO (2)	0–2	FC Haka (1)	Joensuu
18:00		Report	Sejdiu 8'; Patoulidis 22'	Stadium: Mehtimäki; Attendance: 410; Referee: Miikka Haapakoski

16 April 2024	SiU (6)	0–21	KTP (2)	Simpele
18:30		Report	Tanninen 1', 41', 66', 90'; Harbas 4', 17', 37', 48', 56', 58', 82'; Toulgeroglou 14', 45', 69'; Paavola 20'; Hyppönen 24', 38', 54', 76'; Huttunen 61'; Edlund 89' (pen.)	Stadium: Keskuskenttä; Attendance: 150; Referee: Niko Rantalainen

16 April 2024	MyPa (4)	1–2	FC Vaajakoski (3)	Myllykoski
18:30	Innanen 9' (pen.)	Report	Kovaqi (yellow card) 9' (yellow-red card) 9'; Sarkkinen 41'; Mehtonen 61'	Stadium: KSOY Stadion; Attendance: 487; Referee: Abdirahman Sugulle

16 April 2024	Reipas (4)	1–0	JJK (3)	Lahti
19:00	Shala 90+1'	Report		Stadium: Kisapuisto Stadion; Attendance: 148; Referee: Miika Pesonen

16 April 2024	ViPa (5)	0–8	MP (2)	Laukaa
19:00		Report	Ylönen 25'; Urgenc 32'; Landry Koffi 44', 55'; Jäppinen 59', 82'; Forsell 88'; Liljaniemi 90'	Stadium: Vihtavuori LP; Attendance: 407; Referee: Minka Vekkeli

20 April 2024	IPS Edustus (5)	0–1	MiPK (5)	Imatra
20:00		Report	Teräsranta 73'	Stadium: Ukonniemi-areena; Attendance: 60; Referee: Petri Nummikari

23 April 2024	Rangers (5)	0–3	PEPO (4)	Jyväskylä
19:00		Report	Sinkkonen 20'; Värtö 33', 63'	Stadium: Viitaniemi; Attendance: 41; Referee: Hassan Soltani

23 April 2024	MP/2 (5)	2–1	KeuPa (5)	Mikkeli
19:30	V Nikulainen 28' (pen.); K Torniainen 34'	Report	Adebayo 90+1'	Stadium: Mikkelin jp-halli Attendance: 100; Referee: Jouni Kautonen

28 April 2024	PK-37 (5)	2–2 (5–6 p)	Kultsu FC (5)	Iisalmi
16:30	Ronkainen 13'; Rissanen 57'	Report	A Kinnunen 11'; Partanen 18'	Stadium: Kankaan LP; Attendance: 150; Referee: Jorik Hoxha

=== Group 4 ===
15 April 2024	RoPo (5)	0–8	SJK (1)	Rovaniemi
19:00	Silander (red card) 74'	Report	Hannola 28'; Fati 39'; Majander 51' (o.g.); Paananen 52', 54'; Kemppainen 71', 88'; Ndiaye 75' (pen.)	Stadium: Keskuskenttä; Attendance: 777; Referee: Satu Miettunen

16 April 2024	Virkiä (6)	1–7	AC Oulu (1)	Lapua
18:00	Koski 73'	Report	Saarela 34'; Hölttä 39'; Kähkönen 46'; Dunwoody 56'; Marquinhos 62', 66'; Salmensuu 70'	Stadium: Liuhtari; Attendance: 600; Referee: Robin Kuloaro

16 April 2024	Sporting Kristina (5)	1–5	VIFK (3)	Kristinestad
18:00	Onyejelem 64'	Report	Wulff 10', 41'; F Hiekkanen 33'; Westermark 42'; Irumwa 45+1'	Stadium: Braheplan; Attendance: 129; Referee: Oskari Kaarniranta

16 April 2024	JBK (4)	1–1 (4–3 p)	RoPS (3)	Jakobstad
18:30	Shellman 87' (pen.)	Report	Savolainen 35'	Stadium: Tellushallen; Attendance: 122; Referee: Mikko Juusola

16 April 2024	Roi Utd (5)	0–4	GBK (4)	Rovaniemi
19:00		Report	Moraes 31', 42' (pen.); Sundqvist 66'; Uwaegbulam 71'	Stadium: Keskuskenttä; Attendance: 68; Referee: Kalle Pitkänen

16 April 2024	OTP (4)	0–3	FF Jaro (2)	Oulu
19:00		Report	Eremenko 69' (pen.); Sipola 81'; Kähkönen 88'	Stadium: Heinäpää PH; Attendance: 120; Referee: Tatu Korkalainen

16 April 2024	FC Kiisto (5)	2–5	KPV (3)	Vaasa
19:00	Lehtimäki 55'; Oliveira 69' (o.g.)	Report	Cardoso 24', 33'; Koivisto 62'; Viidas 90', 90+4'	Stadium: Lemonsoft Stadion; Attendance: 98; Referee: Mika-Markku Karjala

16 April 2024	SIF (5)	0–6	SJK Akatemia (2)	Korsholm
19:00		Report	Machaal 5'; Hänninen 12' (pen.), 18'; Hautamäki 54'; Lehto 73'; Ainasoja 84'	Stadium: Botniahalli ulko Attendance: 104; Referee: Niko Jokinen

17 April 2024	Hercules (4)	0–4	OLS (3)	Oulu
19:00		Report	Karlsson 10'; Räisänen 23'; Parkkila 26'; Raittinen 67'	Stadium: Heinäpää PH; Attendance: 263; Referee: Eemil Hietakangas

20 April 2024	KaPa (5)	5–0	KePS (5)	Kajaani
14:30	Nurkkala 41'; Kiiski 60'; Trindade De Moura 62', 68' (pen.), 75'; Lukkari (red card) 85'	Report		Stadium: Pallohalli; Attendance: 128; Referee: Satu Miettunen

== Round 4 ==
The draw was made on 30 April 2024 on the Football Association's (Palloliito) YouTube channel. 54 winners from Round 3 + 2 Veikkausliiga teams, which was selected based on their League Cup success (FC Inter & FC Lahti), are participate in this round. Winners advance to Round 5.

Number of teams per tier still in competition
Veikkausliiga (1)	Ykkösliiga (2)	Ykkönen (3)	Kakkonen (4)	Kolmonen (5)	Nelonen (6)	Vitonen (7)	Kutonen (8)	Seiska (9)	M35/M40 (+35, +40)	Total
12 / 12	9 / 10	8 / 10	15 / 22	11 / 82	5 / 77	0 / 86	0 / 49	0 / 10	0 / 6	60 / 364

=== Group 1 ===
7 May 2024	PPJ (4)	2–0	JäPS/47 (4)	Jätkäsaari
20:05	Sjölund 41'; Essoh 90+4'	Report		Stadium: Jätkäsaari; Attendance: 110; Referee: Amir Hajizadeh

8 May 2024	Atlantis FC (3)	3–1	JäPS (2)	Järvenpää
18:00	Souza De Almeida 30'; Severino 58'; Rudenko 78'	Report	Holopainen 11'; Ates (manager) (yellow card) 60' (yellow-red card) 60'	Stadium: Koivusaari; Attendance: 117; Referee: Peiman Simani
Note: The match is played at the away team's home field.

8 May 2024	FC Honka (4)	1–2	PK-35 (2)	Espoo
18:30	Pinomaa 90+4'	Report	Rantanen 56'; Adam 60'	Stadium: Tapiola 1 Attendance: 360; Referee: Joona Manninen

8 May 2024	VJS (4)	3–0	Gnistan (1)	Myyrmäki
19:00	Ahonen 70', 86'; Nurmi 77'	Report		Stadium: Jalkapallostadion; Attendance: 520; Referee: Abdirahman Sugulle

8 May 2024	EBK (4)	2–0	PKKU (3)	Espoo
20:00	Koskela 13'; Karaca 73'	Report		Stadium: Keski-Espoo 1 Attendance: 332; Referee: Juuso Vuorinen

8 May 2024	Töölön Taisto (5)	1–1 (4–5 p)	KäPa (2)	Helsinki
20:10	Hyvönen 51'	Report	Sivonen 11'	Stadium: Töölö PK 1 Attendance: 90; Referee: Valentin Smirnov

8 May 2024	NJS (4)	0–3	EPS (3)	Nurmijärvi
20:30		Report	Kiiski 6', 12'; Azhar Al Aboodi 63' (pen.)	Stadium: Klaukkala; Attendance: 134; Referee: Antti Kolehmainen

9 May 2024	LPS (5)	0–5	IFK Mariehamn (1)	Helsinki
15:00		Report	Andersson 47', 58'; Sallinen 48'; Nissinen 63'; Olawale 70'	Stadium: Saari Areena; Attendance: 832; Referee: Osman Mohammadi

9 May 2024	PuiU (5)	1–3	GrIFK (4)	Helsinki
18:00	Biga 47'	Report	Pulkkinen 37'; Dubova 45'; Mohamed 77'	Stadium: Puistola; Attendance: 369; Referee: Jesse Aalto

11 May 2024	PPS/Old Stars (6)	0–6	TuPS (5)	Myyrmäki
19:15		Report	Ma Nevalainen 27', 43'; Halme 41'; Turnbull-Smith 60'; 62' (o.g.); Jung 78'	Stadium: Jalkapallostadion; Attendance: 41; Referee: Kim Junna

12 May 2024	LoPa (6)	0–1	Pöxyt/TNT (6)	Lohja
18:00		Report	19' (o.g.)	Stadium: Ojamo; Attendance: 215; Referee: Miika Kiuru

12 May 2024	NJS/3 (6)	2–2 (0–3 p)	FC Kuusysi (5)	Nurmijärvi
20:00	Murto 59'; Huusko 84' (o.g.)	Report	Utriainen 58' (pen.); Sundholm 90+4'	Stadium: Klaukkala; Attendance: 51; Referee: Reko Morikawa

=== Group 2 ===
8 May 2024	SalPa (2)	2–2 (2–4 p)	EIF (1)	Salo
18:30	Jännes 53'; Foster 64'	Report	Ojala 26', 40'	Stadium: Salon Urheilupuisto; Attendance: 311; Referee: Joni Hyytiä

8 May 2024	Ilves/2 (4)	0–3	FC Inter (1)	Tampere
19:00		Report	Botué 3'; Osede Prieto 21'; Ampofo 90+6'	Stadium: Tammelan Stadion; Attendance: 183; Referee: Henrik Sandmark

8 May 2024	MuSa (5)	2–0	TPV (4)	Pori
19:30	Adeleke 9'; Simeon 81'	Report		Stadium: UK-Tekonurmi; Attendance: 162; Referee: Miro Leppäkoski

9 May 2024	FC Jazz (3)	1–1 (6–7 p)	TPS (2)	Pori
15:00	Campagna 14'	Report	Ulmanen 64'	Stadium: Pori Stadium; Attendance: 409; Referee: Petri Viljanen

9 May 2024	VaKP (6)	2–4	P-Iirot (4)	Valkeakoski
17:15	Seeck 26'; Ylä-Peräinen 61'	Report	J Halminen 17'; Jalkanen 33', 62', 71' (pen.)	Stadium: Sahara; Attendance: 130; Referee: Kalle Mäkinen

9 May 2024	FC Haka j. (5)	0–4	FC Inter 2 (4)	Valkeakoski
20:00		Report	Enbuska 69'; Enberg 75', 83', 89'	Stadium: Tehtaan kenttä Attendance: 69; Referee: Henrik Sandmark

=== Group 3 ===
8 May 2024	MP/2 (5)	0–3	MP (2)	Mikkeli
18:30		Report	Liljaniemi 9'; Viramäki 33'; Ylönen 90+1'	Stadium: Mikkelin jp-halli Attendance: 152; Referee: Tommi Vitikainen

8 May 2024	Kultsu FC (5)	0–7	FC Lahti (1)	Joutseno
18:30		Report	Könkkölä 31'; Ivanovic 69', 82', 83'; Huovila 73', 74', 75'	Stadium: Ravirata; Attendance: 100; Referee: Remi Rantakaulio

8 May 2024	FC Vaajakoski (3)	0–5	KTP (2)	Jyväskylä
18:30		Report	Tarvonen 11', 45+1'; Hyppönen 40', 82'; Stenius 68'	Stadium: Viitaniemi; Attendance: 152; Referee: Lassi Siukkola

8 May 2024	Reipas (4)	1–5	FC Haka (1)	Lahti
19:00	Belabid 88'	Report	Whyte 2'; Lanquedoc 41', 47'; Laaksonen 69'; Bačanin 85'	Stadium: Kisapuisto Stadion; Attendance: 200; Referee: Kalle Mäkinen

8 May 2024	MiPK (5)	1–4	PEPO (4)	Mikkeli
20:45	Haikonen 18'	Report	Junnikkala 10', 16'; Enbuska 57'; Sinkkonen 62'	Stadium: Mikkelin jp-halli Attendance: 100; Referee: Vladislav Dirgin

=== Group 4 ===
8 May 2024	OLS (3)	1–2	SJK (1)	Oulu
18:00	V Ssarikoski 9'	Report	Paananen 63'; Koivisto 88'	Stadium: Heinäpää PH; Attendance: 212; Referee: Pietu Niinimäki

8 May 2024	KaPa (5)	0–0 (4–5 p)	JBK (4)	Kajaani
18:30	Trindade De Moura (yellow card) 74' (yellow-red card) 90'	Report	Häggblom (yellow card) 66' (yellow-red card) 73'	Stadium: Liikuntapuisto; Attendance: 190; Referee: Eemil Hietakangas

8 May 2024	VIFK (3)	1–2	SJK Akatemia (2)	Vaasa
18:30	Mylläri 84'	Report	Hänninen 82', 90+2'	Stadium: Lemonsoft Stadion; Attendance: 132; Referee: Niko Jokinen

8 May 2024	GBK (4)	0–3	AC Oulu (1)	Kokkola
18:30		Report	Huhtala 36'; Marquinhos 74'; Dunwoody 90+2'	Stadium: Keskuskenttä; Attendance: 363; Referee: Saku Peltonen

9 May 2024	KPV (3)	4–0	FF Jaro (2)	Kokkola
18:30	Oteng 2'; Välipakka 48', 67'; Cardoso 58'	Report		Stadium: Keskuskenttä; Attendance: 894; Referee: Mikko Juusola

== Round 5 ==
The draw for this round (and a Round 6) was made on 16 May 2024 on the Football Association's (Palloliito) YouTube channel. 28 winners from Round 4 + 4 remaining Veikkausliiga teams, that play in European games: HJK, Ilves, KuPS & VPS, are participate in the fifth round. From this round, all teams (32) are in one pot. Winners advance to Round 6.

Number of teams per tier still in competition
Veikkausliiga (1)	Ykkösliiga (2)	Ykkönen (3)	Kakkonen (4)	Kolmonen (5)	Nelonen (6)	Vitonen (7)	Kutonen (8)	Seiska (9)	M35 (+35)	Total
11 / 12	6 / 10	3 / 10	8 / 22	3 / 82	1 / 77	0 / 86	0 / 49	0 / 10	0 / 6	32 / 364

14 June 2024	PK-35 (2)	4–0	Pöxyt/TNT (6)	Pihlajamäki
19:00	Lassoued 65', 71', 73'; Vaitomaa 76' (o.g.)	Report		Stadium: Algeco Areena; Attendance: 189; Referee: Mats Helkamo

15 June 2024	TPS (2)	1–0	MP (2)	Turku
15:00	Mohammed 65'	Report		Stadium: Veritas Stadion; Attendance: 518; Referee: Juho Nieminen

15 June 2024	EBK (4)	1–5	FC Haka (1)	Espoo
17:00	Istrefi 81'	Report	Bačanin 49'; Sejdiu 67'; Whyte 76', 78', 84'	Stadium: Keski-Espoo 1 Attendance: 433; Referee: Antti Kolehmainen

15 June 2024	VJS (4)	1–1 (4–2 p)	Atlantis FC (3)	Myyrmäki
17:00	Nurmi 5'	Report	Souza De Almeida 70' (pen.)	Stadium: Jalkapallostadion; Attendance: 316; Referee: Osman Mohammadi

15 June 2024	AC Oulu (1)	5–1	KäPa (2)	Oulu
17:30	Huhtala 5'; Jokelainen 12', 30'; Rennicks 36'; Körkkö 57'; Radziński (yellow card) 61' (yellow-red card) 62'	Report	Turunen 66'	Stadium: Raatti Stadium; Attendance: 647; Referee: Pietu Niinimäki

15 June 2024	Ilves (1)	2–4	SJK (1)	Tampere
18:00	Haarala 33', 45+5'	Report	Hannola 13'; Moreno Ciorciari 22'; Karjalainen 50'; Arsalo 84'	Stadium: Tammelan Stadion; Attendance: 2,246; Referee: Antti Munukka

15 June 2024	FC Inter 2 (4)	1–5	VPS (1)	Turku
19:00	Voca 85'	Report	Ahiabu 1'; Multanen 36', 75'; Vlijter 89'; Jääskä 90+2'	Stadium: Veritas Stadion; Attendance: 0 Referee: Jesse Salo

16 June 2024	SJK Akatemia (2)	1–1 (5–4 p)	P-Iirot (4)	Seinäjoki
14:00	Honkola 55'; Yakubu (red card) 61'	Report	Jalkanen 64' (pen.)	Stadium: OmaSP Stadion; Attendance: 175; Referee: Mikko Juusola

16 June 2024	PEPO (4)	1–0	JBK (4)	Lappeenranta
16:00	Oikkonen 80' (pen.)	Report		Stadium: Kimpinen Sports Centre; Attendance: 346; Referee: Remi Rantakaulio

16 June 2024	EPS (3)	2–2 (7–8 p)	FC Lahti (1)	Espoo
16:00	Ahmed-Nur 4', 84' (pen.)	Report	Babiker 7'; Huovila 12'	Stadium: Espoonlahti 2 Attendance: 760; Referee: Aapo Kyllönen

16 June 2024	FC Kuusysi (5)	0–4	KPV (3)	Lahti
17:00		Report	Mettälä 17' (o.g.); Adarkwa 19'; Ihalainen 51'; Viidas 69'	Stadium: Lahti Stadium; Attendance: 210; Referee: Osman Mohammadi

16 June 2024	KTP (2)	1–5	FC Inter (1)	Kotka
17:00	Weckström 45+1'	Report	Botué 22' (pen.), 63'; Lahdensuo 29'; Kouame 84'; Smith 90+2'	Stadium: Arto Tolsa Areena; Attendance: 1,033; Referee: Kalle Mäkinen

16 June 2024	TuPS (5)	0–5	HJK (1)	Tuusula
18:00		Report	Ezeh 9', 90+3'; Möller 13'; Baranov 30', 89'	Stadium: Tuusulan urheilukeskus Attendance: 2,271; Referee: Abdirahman Sugulle

16 June 2024	PPJ (4)	1–2	EIF (1)	Jätkäsaari
18:00	Sperryn 12'	Report	Ojala 16'; Fofana 82'	Stadium: Jätkäsaari; Attendance: 355; Referee: Vili Lehtovaara

16 June 2024	GrIFK (4)	3–2	MuSa (5)	Kauniainen
18:30	Bergman 6'; Pulkkinen 34'; Toure 79'	Report	Hietava 19'; Auranen 88'	Stadium: Kauniaisten keskuskenttä Attendance: 273; Referee: Fahad Ali

16 June 2024	IFK Mariehamn (1)	1–3	KuPS (1)	Mariehamn
19:00	Olawale 87'	Report	Muzinga 20', 35'; Cardoso 64' (o.g.)	Stadium: Wiklöf Holding Arena; Attendance: 1,782; Referee: Petri Viljanen

== Round 6 ==
The 16 Round 5 winners entered Round 6.

Number of teams per tier still in competition
Veikkausliiga (1)	Ykkösliiga (2)	Ykkönen (3)	Kakkonen (4)	Kolmonen (5)	Nelonen (6)	Vitonen (7)	Kutonen (8)	Seiska (9)	M35 (+35)	Total
9 / 12	3 / 10	1 / 10	3 / 22	0 / 82	0 / 77	0 / 86	0 / 49	0 / 10	0 / 6	16 / 364

24 June 2024	SJK Akatemia (2)	0–3	TPS (2)	Seinäjoki
19:00	Löytökorpi (yellow card) 33'; Kyllönen (yellow card) 52'; Essel (yellow card) 54'	Report	Mohammed 14'; Häggström (yellow card) 37'; Pitkälä 43'; Ikonen 75'	Stadium: OmaSP Stadion; Attendance: 278; Referee: Kalle Mäkinen

25 June 2024	FC Haka (1)	0–0 (5–4 p)	PK-35 (2)	Valkeakoski
18:00	Dantas (yellow card) 56'	Report	Räsänen (yellow card) 56'; Karjalainen (yellow card) 62'; Kurvinen (yellow card) 89'	Stadium: Tehtaan kenttä Attendance: 947; Referee: Joona Manninen
	Penalties
	Whyte (penalty scored); Mastokangas (penalty scored); Dantas (penalty scored); Kilo (penalty scored); Patoulidis (penalty scored)		(penalty scored) Lassoued; (penalty missed) Tiquinho; (penalty scored) Karjalainen; (penalty scored) Kurvinen; (penalty scored) Manneh

25 June 2024	FC Inter (1)	6–1	GrIFK (4)	Turku
18:30	Smith 26', 46'; Lehtisalo 51', 88'; Kekarainen 57'; Kuittinen (yellow card) 70'; Kouame 78'	Report	Hellstén (yellow card) 37'; Mazouz (yellow card) 68'; Toure 75'	Stadium: Veritas Stadion; Attendance: 408; Referee: Jesse Salo

25 June 2024	PEPO (4)	1–5	KuPS (1)	Lappeenranta
18:30	Salminen 69'	Report	Miettinen 3'; Ruoppi 6'; Luyeye-Lutumba 32'; Lampinen 42'; Vidjeskog 85'	Stadium: Kimpinen Sports Centre; Attendance: 1,311; Referee: Ayhan Dag

25 June 2024	KPV (3)	2–1	FC Lahti (1)	Kokkola
18:30	Ring 19'; Ali-Abubakar 56'; Cardoso (yellow card) 61'; Pereira (manager) (yellow card) 83'; Okyere (yellow card) 90'	Report	Tauriainen 8'; Viitikko (yellow card) 90+3'	Stadium: Kokkolan keskuskenttä Attendance: 1,107; Referee: Mikko Juusola

25 June 2024	SJK (1)	5–1	VPS (1)	Seinäjoki
19:00	Pires 16', 43'; Moreno 51', 79'; Karjalainen 85'	Report	Haukioja 33' (pen.); Pitkänen (yellow card) 37'; Jääskä (yellow card) 70'; Nuorela (yellow card) 78' (yellow-red card) 85'	Stadium: OmaSP Stadion; Attendance: 2,385; Referee: Matti Roth

25 June 2024	VJS (4)	0–2	AC Oulu (1)	Myyrmäki
19:00	Koivunen (yellow card) 37'; Merinen (yellow card) 45+1'; Jurvanen (yellow card) 90+1'	Report	Elo (yellow card) 28'; Hölttä (yellow card) 86'; Coffey 89', 90+4'	Stadium: Myyrmäen jalkapallostadion Attendance: 812; Referee: Amir Hajizadeh

26 June 2024	EIF (1)	0–0 (4–2 p)	HJK (1)	Tammisaari
18:30	Kanté (yellow card) 44'; Katz (yellow card) 51'; Pallas (yellow card) 60'	Report	Ritari (yellow card) 39'; Tomas (yellow card) 53'; Kanellopoulos (yellow card) 59'; Yli-Kokko (yellow card) 70'; García Rodríguez (assistant coach) (yellow card) 72'; Plange (yellow card) 90+6'	Stadium: Ekenäs Sparbank Arena; Attendance: 1,435; Referee: Juuso Vuorinen
	Penalties
	Yefimov (penalty scored); Ojala (penalty scored); Fofana (penalty missed); Lindholm (penalty scored); Katz (penalty scored)		(penalty scored) Möller; (penalty missed) Tanaka; (penalty missed) Hostikka; (penalty scored) Tomas

== Quarter-finals ==
The draw for this round (and a draw for semi-finals and final) was made on 27 June 2024 on the Football Association's (Palloliito) YouTube channel. The 8 Round 6 winners entered the quarter-finals.

Number of teams per tier still in competition
Veikkausliiga (1)	Ykkösliiga (2)	Ykkönen (3)	Kakkonen (4)	Kolmonen (5)	Nelonen (6)	Vitonen (7)	Kutonen (8)	Seiska (9)	M35 (+35)	Total
6 / 12	1 / 10	1 / 10	0 / 22	0 / 82	0 / 77	0 / 86	0 / 49	0 / 10	0 / 6	8 / 364

3 July 2024	FC Inter (1)	3–2	TPS (2)	Turku
18:00	Stavitski 28', 37'; Hämäläinen (yellow card) 31'; Krebs (yellow card) 54'; Tamminen 86'; Muñoz (assistant manager) (yellow card) 86'	Report	Pippola (yellow card) 57'; Lakkamäki 82'; Karlsson (yellow card) 73' (goal) 90+3'	Stadium: Veritas Stadion; Attendance: 6,144; Referee: Mohammad Al-Emara

3 July 2024	EIF (1)	0–2	KuPS (1)	Tammisaari
18:30	Katz (yellow card) 45'; Lehtonen (yellow card) 69'; Kabashi (yellow card) 77'; Fofana (yellow card) 90+4'	Report	Pennanen 10'; Muzinga 42'; Honkavaara (manager) (yellow card) 45+2'; Oksanen (yellow card) 80'; Heinonen (yellow card) 85'	Stadium: Ekenäs Sparbank Arena; Attendance: 1,302; Referee: Oliver Reitala

3 July 2024	KPV (3)	1–2	FC Haka (1)	Kokkola
18:30	Välipakka 31'; Länsipää (yellow card) 88'; Viidas (yellow card) 90+2'; Pereira (manager) (yellow card) 90+3'; Pires (assistant manager) (yellow card) 90+3'	Report	Lanquedoc 2'; Fall (yellow card) 48'; Morais (yellow card) 68'; Smith (manager) (yellow card) 83'; Patoulidis (yellow card) 85'; Friberg 90+1'	Stadium: Kokkolan Keskuskenttä; Attendance: 1,618; Referee: Peiman Simani

3 July 2024	SJK (1)	2–0	AC Oulu (1)	Seinäjoki
19:00	Moreno 32'; Laine 65'	Report		Stadium: OmaSP Stadion; Attendance: 2,027; Referee: Joni Hyytiä

== Semi-finals ==
The 4 quarter-final winners entered the semi-finals.

Number of teams per tier still in competition
Veikkausliiga (1)	Ykkösliiga (2)	Ykkönen (3)	Kakkonen (4)	Kolmonen (5)	Nelonen (6)	Vitonen (7)	Kutonen (8)	Seiska (9)	M35 (+35)	Total
4 / 12	0 / 10	0 / 10	0 / 22	0 / 82	0 / 77	0 / 86	0 / 49	0 / 10	0 / 6	4 / 364

21 August 2024	FC Haka (1)	1–2	FC Inter (1)	Valkeakoski
18:00	Morais (yellow card) 55'; Whyte 60'	Report	Järvinen (yellow card) 39'; Nzoko 52'; Smith 57' (pen.)	Stadium: Tehtaan kenttä Attendance: 1,912; Referee: Joni Hyytiä

22 August 2024	SJK (1)	2–2 (7–8 p)	KuPS (1)	Seinäjoki
19:00	Moreno 27', 42'; Arsalo (yellow card) 66'; Naamo (yellow card) 76'; Pires (yellow card) 76'; Fati (yellow card) 89'; Streng (yellow card) 90+4'; Gasc (yellow card) 90+7'; Strapp (yellow card) 111'	Report	Diawara 61' (yellow card) 79' (yellow-red card) 81'; Antwi 90+7'; Oksanen (yellow card) 118'	Stadium: OmaSP Stadion; Attendance: 2,644; Referee: Oliver Reitala
	Penalties
	Hannola (penalty missed); Streng (penalty scored); Paananen (penalty scored); Tikkanen (penalty missed); Gasc (penalty scored); Pires (penalty scored); Arsalo (penalty scored); Ndiaye (penalty scored); Kemppainen (penalty scored); Paunio (penalty missed)		(penalty missed) Heinonen; (penalty scored) Cissé; (penalty scored) Antwi; (penalty scored) Oksanen; (penalty missed) Pennanen; (penalty scored) Saarinen; (penalty scored) Kreidl; (penalty scored) Siltanen; (penalty scored) Miettinen; (penalty scored) Ruoppi

== Final ==
The final was held between the two semi-final winners.

Number of teams per tier still in competition
Veikkausliiga (1)	Ykkösliiga (2)	Ykkönen (3)	Kakkonen (4)	Kolmonen (5)	Nelonen (6)	Vitonen (7)	Kutonen (8)	Seiska (9)	M35 (+35)	Total
2 / 12	0 / 10	0 / 10	0 / 22	0 / 82	0 / 77	0 / 86	0 / 49	0 / 10	0 / 6	2 / 364

21 September 2024	FC Inter (1)	1–2 (a.e.t.)	KuPS (1)	Tampere
18:00	Kuittinen (yellow card) 23'; Smith 51'; Huuhtanen (yellow card) 75'; Legbo (yellow card) 84'; Granlund (yellow card) 94'; Järvinen (yellow card) 108'	Report	Miettinen (yellow card) 19'; Hämäläinen (yellow card) 39'; Saarinen (yellow card) 54'; Pennanen 86', 92' (yellow card) 120+1'; Voutilainen (yellow card) 120+1'	Stadium: Tammelan Stadion; Attendance: 5,745; Referee: Oliver Reitala
