= Thomas Lahdensuo =

Finnish footballer (born 2005)

Personal information
- Full name: Thomas Fredrik Matias Lahdensuo
- Date of birth: 8 June 2005 (age 21)
- Place of birth: Porvoo, Finland
- Height: 1.80 m (5 ft 11 in)
- Position: Winger

Team information
- Current team: Haka
- Number: 7

Youth career
- –2019: Futura
- 2020–2022: Käpylän Pallo

Senior career*
| Years | Team | Apps | (Gls) |
| 2023 | Käpylän Pallo | 24 | (4) |
| 2024–2025 | Inter Turku | 25 | (3) |
| 2024–2025 | Inter Turku II | 11 | (9) |
| 2025 | KTP | 6 | (0) |
| 2026– | Haka | 18 | (0) |
- * Club domestic league appearances and goals as of 1 November 2026

Thomas Fredrik Matias Lahdensuo (born 8 June 2005) is a Finnish professional footballer, playing as a winger for Ykkösliiga club Haka.

== Club career ==
After playing in the youth sectors of Futura and Käpylän Pallo (KäPa), Lahdensuo was named in the KäPa first team squad for the 2023 Ykkönen season in Finland's second-tier.

He played one season with KäPa in Ykkönen, before on 28 November 2023, he signed a professional contract with Inter Turku in top-tier Veikkausliiga. On 24 September, his option for the 2025 season was exercised.

== Career statistics ==
As of 14 August 2025

Appearances and goals by club, season and competition
| Club | Season | League | | | National cup (Note: Includes Suomen Cup) | | League cup (Note: Includes Ykkönen Cup and Finnish League Cup) | | Europe | | Total | |
| Club | Season | Division | Apps | Goals | Apps | Goals | Apps | Goals | Apps | Goals | Apps | Goals |
|---|---|---|---|---|---|---|---|---|---|---|---|---|
| Käpylän Pallo | 2023 | Ykkönen | 24 | 4 | 1 | 0 | 1 | 0 | — | | 26 | 4 |
| Inter Turku | 2024 | Veikkausliiga | 21 | 2 | 6 | 1 | 4 | 0 | — | | 31 | 3 |
| Inter Turku | 2025 | Veikkausliiga | 4 | 1 | 2 | 0 | 6 | 0 | – | | 12 | 1 |
| Inter Turku | Total | | 25 | 3 | 8 | 1 | 10 | 0 | 0 | 0 | 43 | 4 |
| Inter Turku II | 2024 | Kakkonen | 9 | 8 | — | | — | | — | | 9 | 8 |
| Inter Turku II | 2025 | Ykkönen | 2 | 1 | — | | — | | — | | 2 | 1 |
| Inter Turku II | Total | | 11 | 9 | 0 | 0 | 0 | 0 | 0 | 0 | 11 | 9 |
| KTP | 2025 | Veikkausliiga | 0 | 0 | — | | — | | — | | 0 | 0 |
| Career total | | | 60 | 16 | 9 | 1 | 10 | 0 | 0 | 0 | 79 | 17 |

== Honours ==
Inter Turku

- Finnish Cup runner-up: 2024
- Finnish League Cup: 2024, 2025
