= Bismark Ampofo =

Ghanaian footballer (born 2002)

Personal information
- Date of birth: 4 August 2002 (age 24)
- Place of birth: Accra, Ghana
- Height: 1.70 m (5 ft 7 in)
- Position: Midfielder

Team information
- Current team: Inter Turku
- Number: 17

Youth career
- –2022: Rumark Football Academy

Senior career*
Years	Team	Apps	(Gls)
2023–	Inter Turku	68	(4)
- * Club domestic league appearances and goals as of 12 November 2026

Bismark Ampofo, nicknamed Opoku, (born 4 August 2002) is a Ghanaian professional footballer, playing as a central midfielder for Finnish Veikkausliiga club Inter Turku.

== Early life ==
Ampofo grew up in Ghana, in a small village near Kumasi. At the age of four, his parents divorced and he moved to live with his grandmother along with his brothers and cousins. He quitted school aged eight, and eventually joined a football academy in Ivory Coast. Three years later Ampofo moved to another football academy in Mali. He spent eight years in Mali before returning to his native Ghana and joining Rumark Academy.

== Club career ==
In the Autumn 2022, Ampofo was scouted by a Finnish player agent in a local football tournament in Ghana. Later he made a pre-contract with HJK Helsinki, but after spending three weeks on trial with the club's U19 team, reserve team and the first team, he was released.

=== Inter Turku ===
A few weeks prior to the start of the 2023 Veikkausliiga season, Ampofo signed a professional contract with Inter Turku, on a one-year deal with an option for extension. He made his Veikkausliiga debut on 5 May 2023, in away game against SJK.

After a promising start to the season, Ampofo became a regular in the starting line-up of the team, and in July 2023, his contract was extended until the end of 2025. Ampofo scored his first Veikkausliiga goal on 7 August 2023, in a 4–1 away victory against KTP. He also scored the winning goal on 26 August 2023, in a 2–1 home victory against Lahti. After his first professional season, Ampofo was named The Best Player of the Season by the supporters of Inter, and the Footballer of the Year of the Southwest Finland in a local sports gala.

Next season Ampofo managed to make 11 appearances in the league, before on 17 July 2024 it was reported that he would be sidelined for the rest of the season due to a surgery-requiring foot injury.

== Career statistics ==
As of 4 August 2025

Appearances and goals by club, season and competition
Club	Season	League			National cup (Note: Includes Suomen Cup)		League cup		Continental		Total	
Club	Season	Division	Apps	Goals	Apps	Goals	Apps	Goals	Apps	Goals	Apps	Goals
Inter Turku	2023	Veikkausliiga	22	2	2	0	0	0	—		24	2
Inter Turku	2024	Veikkausliiga	11	0	1	1	7	0	—		19	1
Inter Turku	2025	Veikkausliiga	15	2	1	0	0	0	–		16	2
Inter Turku	Total		48	4	4	1	7	0	0	0	59	5
Career total			48	4	4	1	7	0	0	0	59	5

== Honours ==
Inter Turku

- Finnish Cup runner-up: 2024
- Finnish League Cup: 2024
