= Oiva Laaksonen =

Finnish footballer (born 2003)

Personal information
- Full name: Oiva Olavi Laaksonen
- Date of birth: 19 September 2003 (age 23)
- Place of birth: Finland
- Height: 1.81 m (5 ft 11 in)
- Position: Winger

Team information
- Current team: Haka
- Number: 16

Youth career
- –2015: Haka

Senior career*
Years	Team	Apps	(Gls)
2021–2024	Haka	16	(1)
2022–2024	Haka II	15	(20)
2021	→ TPV (loan)	11	(2)
2022	→ HJS (loan)	4	(3)
2023	→ SexyPöxyt (loan)	7	(3)
2024	→ HJS (loan)	7	(1)
2024	→ AFC Eskilstuna (loan)	10	(2)
2025	Voska Sport	0	(0)
2025	AFC Eskilstuna	25	(3)
2026–	Haka	23	(5)
- * Club domestic league appearances and goals as of 1 November 2026

Oiva Olavi Laaksonen (born 19 September 2003) is a Finnish professional football player who plays as a winger for Haka.
