= Tino Purme =

Finnish footballer (born 1998)

Personal information
- Date of birth: 14 March 1998 (age 28)
- Place of birth: Hämeenlinna, Finland
- Height: 1.81 m (5 ft 11 in)
- Position: Midfielder

Youth career
- 2003–2012: NJS
- 2013–2017: HJK

Senior career*
Years	Team	Apps	(Gls)
2016–2017	Klubi 04	2	(0)
2016	→ NJS (loan)	18	(4)
2017–2018	NJS	33	(6)
2019–2023	Haka	122	(2)
2024	Ylöjärvi United	14	(9)
- * Club domestic league appearances and goals as of 2 November 2024

Tino Purme (born 14 March 1998) is a Finnish professional footballer who plays as a central midfielder.

== Club career ==
On 6 October 2023 when playing for Haka, Purme made his 100th appearance in Veikkausliiga in a match against Lahti.
