= Riku Jääskä =

Finnish footballer (born 1998)

Personal information
- Date of birth: 4 February 1998 (age 28)
- Place of birth: Finland
- Height: 1.82 m (6 ft 0 in)
- Position: Forward

Youth career
- VPS
- VIFK

Senior career*
Years	Team	Apps	(Gls)
2017	Kiisto	20	(18)
2018	VIFK	5	(0)
2019–2020	Kiisto	33	(43)
2021–2024	VPS	41	(4)
2022–2024	VPS II	16	(17)
- * Club domestic league appearances and goals as of 5 October 2024

Riku Jääskä (born 4 February 1998) is a Finnish professional footballer who most recently played as a forward for Veikkausliiga club Vaasan Palloseura (VPS).

== Honours ==
VPS

- Ykkönen: 2021
