= Samuli Hölttä =

Finnish footballer (born 1999)

Personal information
- Date of birth: 18 November 1999 (age 26)
- Place of birth: Oulu, Finland
- Height: 1.87 m (6 ft 2 in)
- Position: Centre back

Team information
- Current team: KTP
- Number: 5

Youth career
- HauPa

Senior career*
| Years | Team | Apps | (Gls) |
| 2015–2018 | HauPa | 41 | (5) |
| 2019–2020 | Hercules | 37 | (2) |
| 2021 | Jippo | 24 | (0) |
| 2022–2023 | MP | 42 | (4) |
| 2024 | AC Oulu | 16 | (1) |
| 2025 | OLS Oulu | 2 | (0) |
| 2026– | KTP | 12 | (0) |
- * Club domestic league appearances and goals as of 1 November 2026

Samuli Hölttä (born 18 November 1999) is a Finnish professional football defender who plays as a centre back for Ykkösliiga side KTP.

== Career ==
=== HauPa and Hercules ===
Hölttä started to play football in youth teams of HauPa in Haukipudas. He made his senior debut for the HauPa first team in 2016. He played in Kakkonen and Kolmonen with HauPa first team, and in Nelonen with HauPa II second team. He moved to JS Hercules to play in Kakkonen for the 2019 season.

=== Jippo ===
In the early 2021, Hölttä left Oulu and signed with Jippo in Joensuu for the 2021 Ykkönen season.

=== Mikkelin Palloilijat ===
After Jippo were relegated, Hölttä signed with fellow Ykkönen club Mikkelin Palloilijat (MP) for the 2022 season. His contract with MP was extended for 2023 season, and he was named the captain of his team.

=== AC Oulu ===
On 21 November 2023, Hölttä returned to Oulu and signed a two-year deal with Veikkausliiga club AC Oulu. Hölttä stated, that it feels good to return to Oulu after three years playing in the Eastern Finland. He debuted with his new club on 27 January 2024, in a Finnish League Cup draw against FC Haka. On 4 May, Hölttä debuted in Veikkausliiga, in a 3–2 away loss against Ilves. He scored his first goal in Veikkausliiga on 1 September, in a 2–1 away defeat against IFK Mariehamn.

== Personal life ==
In July 2022, Hölttä was diagnosed with testicle cancer, which was found from the doping test results. He got his last treatment of cytostatic drugs in January 2023, and survived the cancer.

== Career statistics ==
As of 26 February 2025

Appearances and goals by club, season and competition
| Club | Season | League | | | Cup (Note: Includes Suomen Cup) | | League cup (Note: Includes Kakkonen Cup, Ykkönen Cup and Finnish League Cup) | | Europe | | Total | |
| Club | Season | Division | Apps | Goals | Apps | Goals | Apps | Goals | Apps | Goals | Apps | Goals |
|---|---|---|---|---|---|---|---|---|---|---|---|---|
| HauPa | 2015 | Kakkonen | 3 | 0 | 0 | 0 | — | | — | | 3 | 0 |
| HauPa | 2016 | Kakkonen | 7 | 2 | 0 | 0 | — | | — | | 7 | 2 |
| HauPa | 2017 | Kolmonen | 17 | 3 | 1 | 0 | — | | — | | 18 | 3 |
| HauPa | 2018 | Kolmonen | 14 | 0 | 0 | 0 | — | | — | | 14 | 0 |
| HauPa | Total | | 41 | 5 | 1 | 0 | 0 | 0 | 0 | 0 | 42 | 5 |
| HauPa II | 2017 | Nelonen | 11 | 3 | — | | — | | — | | 11 | 3 |
| HauPa II | 2018 | Nelonen | 1 | 0 | — | | — | | — | | 1 | 0 |
| HauPa II | Total | | 12 | 3 | 0 | 0 | 0 | 0 | 0 | 0 | 12 | 3 |
| Hercules | 2019 | Kakkonen | 20 | 0 | 1 | 0 | 3 | 1 | — | | 24 | 1 |
| Hercules | 2020 | Kakkonen | 17 | 2 | 0 | 0 | 1 | 0 | — | | 18 | 2 |
| Hercules | Total | | 37 | 2 | 1 | 0 | 4 | 1 | 0 | 0 | 42 | 3 |
| Jippo | 2021 | Ykkönen | 24 | 0 | 3 | 0 | — | | — | | 27 | 0 |
| MP | 2022 | Ykkönen | 22 | 3 | 3 | 0 | 2 | 0 | — | | 27 | 3 |
| MP | 2023 | Ykkönen | 20 | 1 | 2 | 0 | 0 | 0 | — | | 22 | 1 |
| MP | Total | | 42 | 4 | 5 | 0 | 2 | 0 | 0 | 0 | 49 | 4 |
| AC Oulu | 2024 | Veikkausliiga | 16 | 1 | 5 | 1 | 5 | 0 | — | | 26 | 2 |
| AC Oulu | 2025 | Veikkausliiga | 0 | 0 | 0 | 0 | 4 | 0 | – | | 4 | 0 |
| AC Oulu | Total | | 16 | 1 | 5 | 1 | 9 | 0 | 0 | 0 | 30 | 2 |
| Career total | | | 172 | 15 | 15 | 1 | 15 | 1 | 0 | 0 | 202 | 17 |
