= Emmanuel Okereke =

Nigerian footballer (born 2003)

Personal information
- Full name: Chukwuemeka Emmanuel Okereke
- Date of birth: 30 July 2003 (age 23)
- Place of birth: Lagos, Nigeria
- Height: 1.90 m (6 ft 3 in)
- Position: Centre back

Team information
- Current team: Vaasan Palloseura
- Number: 6

Youth career
- Willbros FC

Senior career*
Years	Team	Apps	(Gls)
2024–2025	IFK Mariehamn	33	(4)
2024–2025	IFK Mariehamn II	5	(0)
2026–	Vaasan Palloseura	31	(0)
- * Club domestic league appearances and goals as of 13 November 2026

Chukwuemeka Emmanuel Okereke (born 30 July 2003) is a Nigerian football player who plays as a centre back for Veikkausliiga club IFK Mariehamn.

== Club career ==
On 17 January 2024, Okereke moved to Finland after signing a two-year deal with IFK Mariehamn in Veikkausliiga. He debuted with his new club on 26 January 2024, in a 1–0 loss in Finnish League Cup against HJK Helsinki.

== Career statistics ==
As of 19 April 2025

Appearances and goals by club, season and competition
Club	Season	League			Cup (Note: Includes Suomen Cup)		League cup (Note: Includes Finnish League Cup)		Europe		Total	
Club	Season	Division	Apps	Goals	Apps	Goals	Apps	Goals	Apps	Goals	Apps	Goals
IFK Mariehamn	2024	Veikkausliiga	11	0	3	1	4	0	–		18	1
IFK Mariehamn	2025	Veikkausliiga	2	1	1	0	3	0	–		6	1
IFK Mariehamn	Total		13	1	4	1	7	0	0	0	24	2
IFK Mariehamn II	2024	Kolmonen	5	0	–		–		–		5	0
Career total			18	1	4	1	7	0	0	0	29	2
