= Joel Lehtonen (footballer) =

Finnish footballer (born 1999)

Personal information
- Full name: Joel Andrei Sakarinpoika Lehtonen
- Date of birth: 29 November 1999 (age 26)
- Place of birth: Pori, Finland
- Height: 1.81 m (5 ft 11 in)
- Position: Defender

Team information
- Current team: FC Lahti
- Number: 2

Youth career
- Jazz

Senior career*
| Years | Team | Apps | (Gls) |
| 2017–2018 | Jazz | 25 | (1) |
| 2019 | Badalona | 0 | (0) |
| 2020–2022 | Jazz | 56 | (3) |
| 2023–2024 | EIF | 46 | (1) |
| 2025 | AC Oulu | 20 | (1) |
| 2026– | FC Lahti | 6 | (0) |
- * Club domestic league appearances and goals as of 13 November 2026

Joel Andrei Sakarinpoika Lehtonen (born 29 November 1999) is a Finnish professional footballer who plays as a right back for Veikkausliiga club FC Lahti.

== Club career ==
After advancing through the youth program of his hometown club FC Jazz, Lehtonen made his senior debut with the club's first team in third-tier Kakkonen in 2017. In 2019, he spent half of a season in Spain with CF Badalona, but returned to Jazz for the 2020 season. He left the club in early 2023.

In January 2023, Lehtonen signed with Ekenäs IF (EIF) in second-tier Ykkönen. The team won the 2023 Ykkönen title and were promoted to top-tier Veikkausliiga. On 1 September 2024, Lehtonen scored his first Veikkausliiga goal for EIF, in a 1–1 home draw against SJK Seinäjoki. EIF were relegated back to the second tier, and Lehtonen left the club after the 2024 season.

On 26 October, AC Oulu in Veikkausliiga announced the signing of Lehtonen on a one-year deal with a one-year option.

== Career statistics ==
As of 27 July 2026

Appearances and goals by club, season and competition
| Club | Season | League | | | Cup (Note: Includes Suomen Cup) | | League cup (Note: Includes Ykkönen Cup and Finnish League Cup) | | Europe | | Total | |
| Club | Season | Division | Apps | Goals | Apps | Goals | Apps | Goals | Apps | Goals | Apps | Goals |
|---|---|---|---|---|---|---|---|---|---|---|---|---|
| Jazz | 2017 | Kakkonen | 10 | 1 | 4 | 0 | – | | – | | 14 | 1 |
| Jazz | 2018 | Kakkonen | 15 | 0 | 0 | 0 | – | | – | | 15 | 0 |
| Jazz | Total | | 25 | 1 | 4 | 0 | 0 | 0 | 0 | 0 | 29 | 1 |
| Badalona | 2019–20 | Segunda División B | 0 | 0 | 0 | 0 | – | | – | | 0 | 0 |
| Jazz | 2020 | Kakkonen | 13 | 0 | 1 | 0 | – | | – | | 14 | 0 |
| Jazz | 2021 | Kakkonen | 20 | 1 | – | | – | | – | | 20 | 1 |
| Jazz | 2022 | Kakkonen | 23 | 2 | 1 | 0 | – | | – | | 24 | 2 |
| Jazz | Total | | 56 | 3 | 2 | 0 | 0 | 0 | 0 | 0 | 58 | 3 |
| EIF Akademi | 2023 | Kolmonen | 1 | 1 | – | | – | | – | | 1 | 1 |
| EIF | 2023 | Ykkönen | 23 | 0 | 4 | 0 | 4 | 0 | – | | 31 | 0 |
| EIF | 2024 | Veikkausliiga | 23 | 1 | 3 | 1 | 4 | 0 | – | | 30 | 2 |
| EIF | Total | | 46 | 1 | 7 | 1 | 8 | 0 | 0 | 0 | 61 | 2 |
| AC Oulu | 2025 | Veikkausliiga | 20 | 1 | 4 | 0 | 5 | 0 | – | | 29 | 1 |
| FC Lahti | 2026 | Veikkausliiga | 5 | 0 | 2 | 0 | 5 | 1 | – | | 12 | 1 |
| Career total | | | 153 | 7 | 19 | 1 | 18 | 1 | 0 | 0 | 190 | 9 |

== Honours ==
EIF

- Ykkönen: 2023
