= Otto Kemppainen =

Finnish footballer (born 2003)

Personal information
- Date of birth: 27 October 2003 (age 23)
- Place of birth: Rovaniemi, Finland
- Position: Defender

Team information
- Current team: AC Oulu
- Number: 16

Youth career
- –2020: RoPS
- 2022: Hellas Verona

Senior career*
Years	Team	Apps	(Gls)
2020–2021	RoPS II	10	(1)
2021	RoPS	26	(4)
2022–2024	SJK II	4	(0)
2023–2024	SJK	34	(2)
2025–	AC Oulu	30	(1)

International career^{‡}
2019	Finland U16	3	(0)
2019–2020	Finland U17	9	(0)
2021–2022	Finland U19	8	(0)
2023	Finland U21	3	(0)
Medal record
RoPS
Second place	Ykkönen	2021
- * Club domestic league appearances and goals as of 12 November 2026 ‡ National team caps and goals as of 3 October 2023

Otto Kemppainen (born 27 October 2003) is a Finnish professional footballer who plays as a defender for Veikkausliiga club AC Oulu and the Finland U21 national team.

== Club career ==
Born in Rovaniemi, Kemppainen started his playing career in Rovaniemen Palloseura (RoPS). After a short stint in Hellas Verona academy in 2022, Kemppainen signed a professional contract with Veikkausliiga club SJK Seinäjoki on 26 July 2022, on a deal until the end of 2024.

On 4 November 2024, Kemppainen signed with AC Oulu in Veikkausliiga on a two-year deal with a one-year option.

== Career statistics ==
As of 26 February 2025

Appearances and goals by club, season and competition
Club	Season	League			Cup (Note: Includes Suomen Cup)		League cup (Note: Includes Finnish League Cup)		Europe		Total	
Club	Season	Division	Apps	Goals	Apps	Goals	Apps	Goals	Apps	Goals	Apps	Goals
RoPS II	2020	Kakkonen	7	1	–		–		–		7	1
RoPS II	2021	Kakkonen	3	0	–		–		–		3	0
RoPS II	Total		10	1	0	0	0	0	0	0	10	1
RoPS	2021	Ykkönen	26	4	2	0	–		–		28	4
SJK Akatemia	2022	Ykkönen	2	0	–		–		–		2	0
SJK Akatemia	2023	Ykkönen	1	0	–		–		–		1	0
SJK Akatemia	2024	Ykkösliiga	1	0	–		–		–		1	0
SJK Akatemia	Total		4	0	0	0	0	0	0	0	4	0
SJK	2023	Veikkausliiga	23	1	2	0	3	0	–		28	1
SJK	2024	Veikkausliiga	11	1	2	2	4	0	–		17	3
SJK	Total		34	2	4	2	7	0	0	0	45	4
AC Oulu	2025	Veikkausliiga	0	0	0	0	2	0	–		2	0
Career total			74	7	6	2	9	0	0	0	89	9
