= Hugo Cardoso =

Cabo Verdean footballer (born 1999)

Personal information
- Full name: Hugo Alexandre Santos Cardoso
- Date of birth: 1 April 1999 (age 27)
- Place of birth: Almada, Portugal
- Height: 1.76 m (5 ft 9 in)
- Position: Right winger

Team information
- Current team: San Antonio Bulo Bulo
- Number: 16

Youth career
- Os Belenenses
- 2017–2019: QPR

Senior career*
Years	Team	Apps	(Gls)
2019–2020	Aljustrelense	21	(2)
2020–2022	Vitória Guimarães B	8	(0)
2022–2023	Santarém	22	(2)
2023–2024	1º Dezembro	16	(1)
2024–2026	IFK Mariehamn	39	(1)
2026–	San Antonio Bulo Bulo	0	(0)

International career^{‡}
2019	Cape Verde U20	1	(0)
- * Club domestic league appearances and goals as of 12 March 2026 ‡ National team caps and goals as of 1 April 2024

Hugo Alexandre Santos Cardoso (born 11 April 1999) is a professional footballer who plays as a right winger for Bolivian Primera División club San Antonio Bulo Bulo. Born in Portugal, he played for the Cape Verde national under-20 team.

== Club career ==
After spending two years in the academy of Queens Park Rangers, Cardoso started his senior career in Portugal in 2019, and represented Aljustrelense, Vitória Guimarães B, Santarém and 1º Dezembro in the country's third and fourth tiers.

On 1 March 2024, Cardoso moved to Finland and signed with IFK Mariehamn in the country's top-tier Veikkausliiga. In December, his deal was extended for the 2025 season.

== International career ==
Cardoso has represented Cape Verde at under-20 youth international level.

== Personal life ==
Born in Portugal, Cardoso is of Cape Verdean descent.

== Career statistics ==
As of 19 May 2025

Appearances and goals by club, season and competition
Club	Season	League			National cup (Note: Includes Taça de Portugal and Suomen Cup)		League cup		Total	
Club	Season	Division	Apps	Goals	Apps	Goals	Apps	Goals	Apps	Goals
Aljustrelense	2019–20	Campeonato de Portugal	21	2	–		–		21	2
Vitória Guimarães B	2020–21	Campeonato de Portugal	5	0	–		–		5	0
Vitória Guimarães B	2021–22	Liga 3	3	0	–		–		3	0
Vitória Guimarães B	Total		8	0	0	0	0	0	8	0
Santarém	2022–23	Campeonato de Portugal	22	1	2	1	–		24	2
1º Dezembro	2023–24	Liga 3	16	1	2	1	–		18	2
IFK Mariehamn	2024	Veikkausliiga	22	1	2	1	0	0	24	2
IFK Mariehamn	2025	Veikkausliiga	8	0	1	0	3	0	12	0
IFK Mariehamn	Total		30	1	3	1	3	0	36	2
Career total			97	5	7	3	3	0	107	8
