= Umar Bala Mohammed =

Nigerian footballer

Umar Muhammed
Personal information
- Full name: Umar Bala Muhammed
- Date of birth: 7 March 1998 (age 28)
- Place of birth: Kaduna, Nigeria
- Height: 1.77 m (5 ft 10 in)
- Positions: Defender; winger

Team information
- Current team: Ibri

Senior career*
Years	Team	Apps	(Gls)
2018–2019	Kada City	2	(1)
2019–2020	Slutsk	27	(5)
2021–2022	Falkenberg	30	(0)
2023–2024	TPS	47	(11)
2025	PK-35		
2025–2026	Najran	28	(11)
2026–	Ibri	0	(0)
- * Club domestic league appearances and goals as of 26 October 2024

Umar Bala Muhammed (born 7 March 1998) is a Nigerian footballer who plays for Omani club Ibri.

On 2 October 2025, Muhammed joined Saudi Second Division club Najran.

== Career statistics ==
As of 26 October 2024.

Appearances and goals by club, season and competition
Club	Season	League			National cup (Note: Includes Belarusian Cup, Svenska Cupen, Suomen Cup)		Continental		Other		Total	
Club	Season	Division	Apps	Goals	Apps	Goals	Apps	Goals	Apps	Goals	Apps	Goals
Kada City	2019	Nigerian Premier League	2	1	–		–		–		2	1
Slutsk	2020	Belarusian Premier League	27	5	2	0	–		–		29	5
Falkenberg	2021	Superettan	16	0	2	0	–		–		18	0
Falkenberg	2022	Ettan	12	0	–		–		–		12	0
Falkenberg	Total		28	0	2	0	0	0	0	0	30	0
TPS	2023	Ykkönen	21	3	1	0	–		1 (Note: Includes Ykköscup)	0	23	3
TPS	2024	Ykkösliiga	26	8	4	3	–		3 (Note: Includes Ykkösliigacup)	2	33	13
TPS	Total		47	11	5	3	0	0	4	2	56	20
PK-35	2025	Ykkösliiga	0	0	0	0	–		0	0	0	0
Career total			104	17	9	3	0	0	4	2	117	22
