= Jowin Radziński =

Polish footballer (born 2001)

Personal information
- Date of birth: 23 April 2001 (age 25)
- Place of birth: Brugge, Belgium
- Height: 1.77 m (5 ft 10 in)
- Position: Left-back

Team information
- Current team: Bałtyk Koszalin

Youth career
- –2013: AP Szczecinek
- 2013–2019: Pogoń Szczecin

Senior career*
Years	Team	Apps	(Gls)
2019–2020	Pogoń Szczecin II	5	(0)
2020	Polonia Warsaw	0	(0)
2020–2024	ŁKS Łódź	0	(0)
2020–2024	ŁKS Łódź II	91	(3)
2024	AC Oulu	4	(0)
2024	→ OLS (loan)	1	(0)
2025–2026	Warta Gorzów Wielkopolski	46	(8)
2026–	Bałtyk Koszalin	0	(0)

International career
2017	Poland U16	1	(0)
2017	Poland U17	4	(0)
- * Club domestic league appearances and goals as of 17:51, 5 June 2026 (UTC)

Jowin Radziński (born 23 April 2001) is a professional footballer who plays as a left-back for III liga club Bałtyk Koszalin. Born in Belgium, he represented Poland at youth international level.

== Club career ==
After playing in Poland, Radziński moved to Finland on 4 April 2024 and signed a professional contract with AC Oulu in Veikkausliiga. He missed most of the season due to injury, and left the club after the season.

On 5 February 2025, Radziński joined III liga club Warta Gorzów Wielkopolski on a deal for the remainder of the season.

On 22 July 2026, Radziński agreed to join another III liga side Bałtyk Koszalin.

== Honours ==
ŁKS Łódź II

- III liga, group I: 2022–23
- IV liga Łódź: 2020–21
