= Thiago Trindade =

Brazilian footballer (born 1989)

Personal information
- Full name: Thiago Trindade de Moura
- Date of birth: 18 February 1989 (age 37)
- Place of birth: Niterói, Rio de Janeiro, Brazil
- Height: 1.80 m (5 ft 11 in)
- Position: Forward

Team information
- Current team: Kajaani
- Number: 30

Senior career*
Years	Team	Apps	(Gls)
2011	Campinense	0	(0)
2012	São João da Barra		
2013	Quissamã	0	(0)
2013	CRAC	0	(0)
2013–2014	Goytacaz		
2014	Caldas Novas		
2015	Atlético Itapemirim	0	(0)
2016	São Gonçalo	0	(0)
2017	OPS	26	(7)
2018	Canto do Rio	0	(0)
2019–	Kajaani	5	(0)
- * Club domestic league appearances and goals as of 01:16, 29 May 2019 (UTC)

Thiago Trindade de Moura (born 18 February 1989), commonly known as Thiago Trindade, is a Brazilian footballer who currently plays as a forward for Kajaani.

== Career statistics ==
=== Club ===
As of 4 May 2019.

Club	Season	League			State League		National Cup		Other		Total	
Club	Season	Division	Apps	Goals	Apps	Goals	Apps	Goals	Apps	Goals	Apps	Goals
Campinense	2011	Série C	0	0	0	0	0	0	0	0	0	0
Quissamã	2013	–			6 (Note: Appearances in the Campeonato Carioca)	1	0	0	0	0	6	1
CRAC	2013	Série C	0	0	4 (Note: Appearances in the Campeonato Goiano)	1	0	0	0	0	4	1
Goytacaz	2014	–			6 (Note: Appearances in the Campeonato Carioca A2)	0	0	0	0	0	6	0
Atlético Itapemirim	2015	–			0	0	0	0	1 (Note: Appearances in the Copa Espírito Santo)	0	1	0
São Gonçalo	2016	–			10 (Note: Appearances in the Campeonato Carioca A3)	5	0	0	6 (Note: Appearances in the Copa Rio)	0	16	5
OPS	2017	Ykkönen	26	7	–		0	0	0	0	26	7
Canto do Rio	2018	–			10 (Note: Appearances in the Campeonato Carioca A4)	3	0	0	0	0	10	3
Kajaani	2019	Ykkönen	1	1	–		0	0	0	0	1	1
Career total			27	8	36	10	0	0	7	0	70	18
