= Markus Arsalo =

Finnish footballer (born 2002)

Personal information
- Full name: Markus Mikael Arsalo
- Date of birth: 21 October 2002 (age 24)
- Place of birth: Tampere, Finland
- Height: 1.83 m (6 ft 0 in)
- Position: Defensive midfielder

Team information
- Current team: AC Oulu
- Number: 25

Youth career
- TPV
- Ilves
- TPS
- 2020–2021: Inter Turku

Senior career*
Years	Team	Apps	(Gls)
2019	TPS II	2	(0)
2020–2022	Inter Turku II	13	(4)
2020–2022	Inter Turku	16	(0)
2021	→ Jazz (loan)	16	(1)
2023	SJK II	18	(1)
2023–2026	SJK	75	(3)
2026–	AC Oulu	14	(0)
- * Club domestic league appearances and goals as of 12 November 2026

Markus Mikael Arsalo (born 21 October 2002) is a Finnish professional footballer who plays as a defensive midfielder for Veikkausliiga club AC Oulu.

== Club career ==
Born in Tampere, Arsalo started his youth career with local clubs TPV and Ilves, before moving to Turku and first joining Turun Palloseura (TPS). He made his Veikkausliiga debut with Inter Turku in the 2022 season, before joining SJK Seinäjoki organisation in December.

During the 2023 season, he played for SJK Akatemia in the second-tier Ykkönen, before he was promoted to the first team for 2024. He scored his first goal for SJK in Veikkausliiga on 27 July, in a 5–5 home draw against Lahti. On 25 October, his deal with SJK was extended until the end of 2026.

== Career statistics ==
As of 23 April 2025

Appearances and goals by club, season and competition
Club	Season	League			Cup (Note: Includes Suomen Cup)		League cup (Note: Includes Finnish League Cup and Ykköscup)		Europe		Total	
Club	Season	Division	Apps	Goals	Apps	Goals	Apps	Goals	Apps	Goals	Apps	Goals
TPS II	2019	Nelonen	2	0	–		–		–		2	0
Inter Turku II	2020	Kolmonen	10	2	–		–		–		10	2
Inter Turku II	2021	Kolmonen	0	0	–		–		–		0	0
Inter Turku II	2022	Kolmonen	3	2	–		–		–		3	2
Inter Turku II	Total		13	4	0	0	0	0	0	0	13	4
Jazz (loan)	2021	Kakkonen	16	1	–		–		–		16	1
Inter Turku	2022	Veikkausliiga	16	0	3	3	3	0	2 (Note: Appearances in UEFA Conference League)	0	24	3
SJK Akatemia	2023	Ykkönen	20	1	0	0	1	0	–		21	1
SJK	2023	Veikkausliiga	0	0	0	0	2	0	–		2	0
SJK	2024	Veikkausliiga	28	1	5	1	5	0	–		38	2
SJK	2025	Veikkausliiga	4	1	0	0	5	0	0	0	9	1
SJK	Total		32	2	5	1	12	0	0	0	49	3
Career total			99	8	8	4	16	0	2	0	125	12

== Honours ==
Inter Turku

- Finnish Cup runner-up: 2022
- Finnish League Cup runner-up: 2022
