= Raymond Mendy =

Gambian footballer (born 1996)

Personal information
- Date of birth: 10 July 1996 (age 30)
- Place of birth: The Gambia
- Position: Midfielder

Team information
- Current team: Lohjan Pallo
- Number: 55

Senior career*
Years	Team	Apps	(Gls)
2015–2018	CS Sfaxien	6	(0)
2016–2017	→ Olympique Béja (loan)	10	(0)
2018	Skellefteå FF	0	(0)
2018	Gżira United	17	(5)
2019	Bodens BK	27	(7)
2020	Sandvikens IF	10	(1)
2021–	Bodens BK	0	(0)
- * Club domestic league appearances and goals as of 16 July 2023

Raymond Mendy (born 7 January 1996) is a Gambian professional footballer who plays as a midfielder for Lohjan Pallo.
