= 2026 Finnish Cup =

Tournament details
- Country: Finland
- Teams: 417

Final positions
- Champions: FC Inter
- Runners-up: HJK

Tournament statistics
- Matches played: 416
- Goals scored: 2,116 (5.09 per match)

The 2026 Finnish Cup is the 72nd season of the Finnish Cup football competition. The winners will qualify for the 2027–28 Conference League second qualifying round. HJK were the defending champions.

== Calendar ==
Round	Dates	Draw	Clubs involved	Winners from previous round	New entries this round	Leagues entering this round
Preliminary round	6 February – 8 March	29 January	242	-	242	Nelonen and lower levels (242 teams)
First round	6 February – 19 March	29 January	240	121	119	Kolmonen and lower levels (119 teams)
Second round	9 – 29 March	4 March	120	120	-	-
Third round	7 – 19 April	1 April	112	60	52	Veikkausliiga (8 non-UEFA teams); Ykkösliiga (9 teams); Ykkönen (10 teams); Kakkonen (25 teams)
Fourth round	28 April – 3 May	21 April	56	56	-	-
Fifth round	13 - 14 May	5 May	32	28	4	Veikkausliiga (4 UEFA Competitions-teams)
Sixth round	26 – 27 May	5 May	16	16	-	-
Quarter-finals	10 June	2 June	8	8	-	-
Semi-finals	30 June – 1 July	2 June	4	4	-	-
Final	5 September	2 June	2	2	-	-

== Format ==
The cup is played as a one legged knockout tournament. Registration for the tournament ran from November 24, 2025 to January 8, 2026.

417 teams (second highest amount in history) registered to participate in this year addition. Since Mandem CF and FC Finnkurd didn't participate in the cup, the number of teams was 415. Lower league teams received home advantage until the fourth round. Teams were divided into geographical groups for the draw until 5th round.

== Preliminary round ==
The draw for the preliminary round (Finnish: Juuson Kierros, in honor of Juuso Walden) of the 2026 Finnish Cup was made on 29 January 2026 at 11:00 am (Finnish Time) on the Football Association of Finland's (Palloliito) YouTube channel. 242 teams participate in this round. They are divided into ten groups based on geography.

Number of teams per tier still in competition
Veikkausliiga (1)	Ykkösliiga (2)	Ykkönen (3)	Kakkonen (4)	Kolmonen (5)	Nelonen (6)	Vitonen (7)	Kutonen (8)	Seiska (9)	M35 (+35)	Total
12 / 12	9 / 9	10 / 10	25 / 25	91 / 91	88 / 88	100 / 100	65 / 65	12 / 12	3 / 3	415 / 415

== Round 1 ==
The draw for the first round was made on 29 January 2026 at 11:00 AM (Finnish Time) on the Finnish Football Association's (Palloliito) YouTube channel. 240 teams participate in this round. They are divided into ten groups based on geography.

Number of teams per tier still in competition
Veikkausliiga (1)	Ykkösliiga (2)	Ykkönen (3)	Kakkonen (4)	Kolmonen (5)	Nelonen (6)	Vitonen (7)	Kutonen (8)	Seiska (9)	M35 (+35)	Total
12 / 12	9 / 9	10 / 10	25 / 25	91 / 91	74 / 88	53 / 100	20 / 65	0 / 12	1 / 3	295 / 415

=== Group 1 (Capital region) ===
15 February 2026	Vesa (6)	2-2 (7-6 p)	LPS (5)	Helsinki
14:15	Rask 37', 86'	Report	Lahikainen 74'; Laitila 88'	Stadium: Tali halli TN; Attendance: 50; Referee: Daniel Saarela
	Penalties
	Nieminen (penalty scored); Hollis (penalty scored); Rahko (penalty scored); Kainulainen (penalty scored); Rissanen (penalty scored); Häggman (penalty scored); Rask (penalty scored)		(penalty scored) Laitila; (penalty scored) Simonen; (penalty scored) Daniel Stierncreutz; (penalty scored) Yusefi; (penalty scored) Kristian Stierncreutz; (penalty scored) Lahikainen; (penalty missed) Ronimus

18 February 2026	EsPa (5)	0-1	FC Kontu (5)	Espoo
20:00		Report	Gröhn 5'	Stadium: Matinkylä 1 TN; Attendance: 25; Referee: Fereidoun Mohammadi

8 March 2026	Colo-Colo (6)	0-7	Valtti (5)	Helsinki
12:00		Report	Mung 45+2'; Okic 52'; Nlate 60'; Berg 71'; Millar 75'; Berisha 77', 88'	Stadium: Töölö PK 1 TN; Attendance: 0 Referee: Sami Kekäläinen

12 March 2026	PK-35/2 (7)	0-5	ST4Y (6)	Pihlajamäki
19:15		Report	Tran Ky 38'; Linjos 49'; Salehzadeh 51'; Aling 65', 72'	Stadium: Algeco Areena TN; Attendance: 35; Referee: Salim Ghandagha

13 March 2026	Kasiysi (6)	0-6	LePa (5)	Espoo
20:00		Report	Valtonen 17'; Petäjä 36', 67', 75', 78'; Kuuppo 40'	Stadium: Laaksolahti TN; Attendance: 0 Referee: Abdirisag Ahmed

13 March 2026	HPS/2 (5)	5-1	Atlantis/2 (5)	Helsinki
20:00	Kaivola 24', 82'; Papunen 32'; Tast 39'; Heikkilä 41'	Report	Tabetando 38'	Stadium: Töölö PK 1 TN; Attendance: 200; Referee: Unto Tuominen

14 March 2026	FC Germania/Akademie (8)	2-8	IF Gnistan/3 (6)	Helsinki
12:00	Perciun 38'; Parkkari 40'	Report	Ubani 2'; Hssaini 14', 24', 32'; Haseli 22'; Luukkonen 35', 65'; Hietavuo 71'	Stadium: Töölö PK 1 TN; Attendance: 25; Referee: Amir Sadiku

14 March 2026	FC FC (8)	2-2 (2-3 p)	AFG united (7)	Helsinki
17:00	Ulenius; Asunmaa	Report	Sadeghi A; Barbari	Stadium: Töölö PK 1 TN; Attendance: 31; Referee: Teemu Kaukonen
	Penalties
	Gripenberg (penalty scored); Skog (penalty scored); Ahtola (penalty missed)		Hajizadeh (penalty scored); Mohammadi (penalty scored); Ahmadi (penalty scored)

14 March 2026	FC POHU/United (6)	4-8	Ponnistus (5)	Helsinki
17:00	Oustimenko L 50', 66', 83'; Heino 73'	Report	Ahmala 30'; Smith 37', 58'; Luomanen 49'; Möttö 64', 77'; Pylkkänen 70'; Bena Wa Bena 85'	Stadium: Töölö PK 3 TN; Attendance: 0 Referee: Joel Pilli

14 March 2026	KoiPS (6)	0-4	Pöxyt/TNT (6)	Vantaa
17:15		Report	Koski 17'; Väätäinen 44'; Beilinson 53'; Nummi 85'	Stadium: Tikkurila TN; Attendance: 63; Referee: Kalle Pitkänen

15 March 2026	Gilla FC/26 (8)	0-3	HJK/Kantsu (6)	Helsinki
18:00		Report	Suihko 13', 16'; Mäkinen 90+3'	Stadium: Bolt Arena; Attendance: 0 Referee: Valtteri Ollila

15 March 2026	KeiKa (7)	0-1	Jokerit FC (6)	Myyrmäki
18:30		Report	Heinolainen T 80'	Stadium: Myyrmäki-halli TN; Attendance: 150; Referee: Tom Lindberg

16 March 2026	FC Korso/United (7)	2-0	MLHF (7)	Kerava
20:00	Takki 15'; Haapalehto M 29'	Report		Stadium: Kaleva UP TN; Attendance: 5 Referee: Ville Parviainen

18 March 2026	HePu (7)	2-6	TiPS/U21 (5)	Kauniainen
21:00	Ekmark M 29', 51'	Report	Pola 5', 18'; Tuomola 12', 39', 64'; Mallat 58'	Stadium: GrIFK Arena TN; Attendance: 7 Referee: Gezim Arifi

19 March 2026	PEP (6)	0-3	PPJ/Lauttasaari (5)	Espoo
19:00		Report	Kari 36'; Ogorodnikov 42'; Heiermann 69'	Stadium: Metsämaa TN; Attendance: 75; Referee: Salim Ghandagha

19 March 2026	FC Pehmeet ja Märät (7)	0-2	MPS (5)	Helsinki
19:45		Report	Korhonen 19'; Lindström 61'	Stadium: Mosan Wembley TN; Attendance: 0 Referee: Samuli Lyyra

20 March 2026	PiTa/II (8)	1-5	SUMU (6)	Helsinki
20:00	Holappa 73'	Report	Nenonen 25', 29', 50', 55'; Ali Hassan 70'	Stadium: Töölö PK 3 TN; Attendance: 30; Referee: Teemu Purojärvi

21 March 2026	FC Dons (7)	0-5	FC Kiffen/3 (6)	Helsinki
19:00		Report	Peltola 37'; Krell 37'; Hradecky 40'; Soininen 75', 84'	Stadium: Töölö PK 3 TN; Attendance: 0 Referee: Joel Pilli

22 March 2026	FC Eagles (6)	1-5	MK-United (5)	Helsinki
12:00	Peci A 4'	Report	Nguyen Ha 1', 56'; Azodo 30'; Jrad 49', 78'	Stadium: Töölö PK 1 TN; Attendance: 40; Referee: Fereidoun Mohammadi

22 March 2026	KasiNolla (8)	2-4	HooGee (5)	Helsinki
12:00	Puttonen Vi 45+1', 57'	Report	Langhoff S 12'; Renlund N 29', 68', 86'	Stadium: Töölö PK 3 TN; Attendance: 20; Referee: Seidou Balla

=== Group 2 (Capital region) ===
21 February 2026	Töölön Taisto (5)	1-0	GrIFK/Akatemia (5)	Helsinki
17:00	Varjovirta 45+2'	Report		Stadium: Töölö PK 1 TN; Attendance: 20; Referee: Sakari Ojanen

6 March 2026	Olarin Kiksi (6)	7-1	FC Samba (7)	Espoo
20:00	Ryhänen 11', 56'; (o.g.) 40', 65'; Lundsten 53'; Tilli 76'; Pulkkinen 78'	Report	Ahmed Af 6'	Stadium: Espoonlahti 2 TN; Attendance: 15; Referee: Miika Kiuru

8 March 2026	FC POHU (6)	1-3	SAPA (6)	Helsinki
10:00	Kriik 85'	Report	Rautio (1}), 46'; Pylkkänen 7'	Stadium: Töölö PK 1 TN; Attendance: 10; Referee: Seidou Balla

8 March 2026	MPS/Atletico Malmi (5)	0-0 (6-7 p)	Toukolan Teräs (5)	Helsinki
14:15		Report		Stadium: Tali halli TN; Attendance: 70; Referee: Ibrahim Aksoy
	Penalties
	Karaskuru (penalty scored); Mikkonen (penalty scored); Lehtonen (penalty scored); Nurmi (penalty missed); Jolkkonen (penalty missed); Kiema (penalty scored); Vikström (penalty scored); Pietikäinen (penalty scored); Johansson (penalty missed)		Enne (penalty scored); Jouini (penalty missed); Meriläinen (penalty scored); Lahikainen (penalty missed); Nurminen (penalty scored); Julie (penalty scored); Söderholm (penalty scored); Hussein (penalty scored); Määttä V (penalty scored)

8 March 2026	SexyPöxyt (5)	1-4	VJS/Akatemia (5)	Espoo
19:05	Salmi 18'	Report	Fors 45'; (o.g.) 53'; Ketonen 88'; Heinonen 90'	Stadium: Laaksolahti TN; Attendance: 15; Referee: Joel Chydenius

13 March 2026	KPPK (8)	3-10	FC POHU/CJ United (7)	Helsinki
20:00	Jääskeläinen L 21', 84'; Laatunen V 87'	Report	Souris 11', 15', 23', 42', 45+2', 55'; Mäyry O 26'; Laitila 59', 83'; Lahti 86'	Stadium: Töölö PK 3 TN; Attendance: 8 Referee: Matias Marjander

13 March 2026	FC Haxi (6)	4-3	Valtti/2 (6)	Puotila
21:00	Rouhiainen 49', 64'; Roble 86'; Åkerlund 90+3'	Report	Jaba 38'; Omar M 52', 73'	Stadium: Hartwall Sport Areena TN; Attendance: 50; Referee: Artjom Mondonen

14 March 2026	HIFK/2 (7)	0-2	SUMU/sob (6)	Helsinki
14:00		Report	Ingoli 51'; Abdi Ah 89'	Stadium: Töölö PK 1 TN; Attendance: 30; Referee: Niklas Heikkonen

14 March 2026	HJK/Töölön Ihme (8)	0-4	KOPSE/VI (7)	Helsinki
19:00		Report	Kaarnasaari 2'; Kääriä 39'; Juntunen 54'; Kohvakka 62'	Stadium: Töölö PK 3 TN; Attendance: 12; Referee: Mahamedamin Abdi

14 March 2026	HooGee/23 (7)	1-2	KY United (7)	Espoo
19:30	Launistola 61'	Report	Torkki 45'; Välimäki 48'	Stadium: Matinkylä 1 TN; Attendance: 20; Referee: Fereidoun Mohammadi

15 March 2026	Ponnistus/2 (6)	2-5	Atlantis FC/Akatemia (5)	Helsinki
14:30	Çekiç 27'; Miettinen 57'	Report	Emongo 35', 51'; Miguel Alcantara de Oliveira 59'; Abdirahman Ahmed 70'; Gökcil 90+3'	Stadium: Töölö PK 5 TN (Sahara); Attendance: 250; Referee: Seidou Balla

15 March 2026	FC POHU/Hurjin (6)	2-2 (5-3 p)	Kurvin Vauhti (6)	Helsinki
15:00	Reunanen 3'; Kilpeläinen 25'	Report	Ahonen 8'; Kemppainen 58'	Stadium: Töölö PK 1 TN; Attendance: 50; Referee: Miika Kiuru
	Penalties
	Hämäläinen (penalty scored); Ruka (penalty scored); Chellaf (penalty scored); Niskanen (penalty scored); Törnwall (penalty scored)		Niskajärvi (penalty missed); Kyytsönen (penalty scored); Kemppainen (penalty scored); Heinonen (penalty scored)

15 March 2026	FC OHO UNITED (8)	1-4	FC Germania (7)	Helsinki
17:00	Zavialets 19'	Report	Anye 75', 90', 90+1'; Suchodolski 82'	Stadium: Töölö PK 5 TN (Sahara); Attendance: 0 Referee: Arto Vanninen

15 March 2026	PETO (7)	3-0	ToTe/Keparoi (7)	Helsinki
21:00	Toiviainen 15', 17'; Haataja 25'	Report		Stadium: Oulunkylä 1 TN; Attendance: 10; Referee: Jussi Virkkunen

19 March 2026	Mando United (7)	3-0 w/o
		Report	Attendance: 0

19 March 2026	FC Honka/Leopardit (7)	1-7	Gilla FC (5)	Espoo
20:00	Tyrväinen 85'	Report	Malolo 21'; Väisänen Joo 49', 88'; Severino 63', 72'; Markkanen 66'; Penninkangas 79'	Stadium: Matinkylä 1 TN; Attendance: 250; Referee: Andrei Neuvonen

19 March 2026	IF Gnistan/M35 (+35)	2-0	PPS (5)	Helsinki
21:00	Halme 30'; Mäkiniemi 76'	Report		Stadium: Oulunkylä 1 TN; Attendance: 100; Referee: Valtteri Ollila

20 March 2026	Etu-Töölön Urhot (6)	0-3	StaPa De Royale (6)	Helsinki
20:00		Report	Karlsson 19'; Sankkinen 45+1', 74'	Stadium: Töölö PK 1 TN; Attendance: 1 Referee: Daniel Saarela

FC Finnkurd currently holds no league standing, a prerequisite for participating in the cup, due to match-fixing and betting fraud. Consequently, Mando United advanced to the next round without playing.

=== Group 3 (Turku, Åland, Raseborg, Salo) ===
22 February 2026	JyTy (5)	0-0 (3-4 p)	PIF (5)	Kaarina
12:00		Report		Stadium: Puuha-areena TN; Attendance: 50; Referee: Lassi Suominen
	Penalties
	Soppi (penalty scored); Henri Lehtonen (penalty scored); Kokkala (penalty missed); Ibrahim (penalty scored); Petri Lehtonen (penalty missed)		(penalty scored) Svanberg; (penalty scored) Vetere; (penalty scored) Bajrami; (penalty scored) Abdallah

28 February 2026	LTU (5)	0-1	Masku (5)	Kaarina
17:00		Report	Riikonen 90'	Stadium: Reunakivi-areena TN; Attendance: 104; Referee: Niilo Heikkinen

4 March 2026	TPS 2 (7)	1-1 (3-2 p)	FC Inter 3 (7)	Turku
20:15	Joshi 9'	Report	Opacic 51'	Stadium: Turku Energia Areena TN; Attendance: 30; Referee: Aleksi Keronen
	Penalties
	Rantanen (penalty scored); Liukkonen (penalty missed); Effati (penalty missed); Joshi (penalty scored); Seppänen (penalty scored)		(penalty scored) Peltonen; (penalty missed) Paularinne; (penalty scored) Huynh; (penalty missed) Ahmadi; (penalty missed) Duah

6 March 2026	Torre Calcio (7)	2-4	VG-62 (5)	Naantali
19:15	Montola 20'; Penttinen 82'	Report	Elomaa 8'; Mikkonen 17'; Saarinen 49'; Pentikäinen 52'	Stadium: Karvetti TN; Attendance: 30; Referee: L Mati Sarmad

11 March 2026	ÅIFK/2 (7)	0-5	KaaPo (5)	Turku
20:00		Report	Vaahtoranta 18', 49'; Kaarrela 69'; Kantola 75'; Pihlajamäki 89'	Stadium: Kupittaa 5 TN; Attendance: 40; Referee: Muamer Coloman

13 March 2026	Peimari Utd 2 (7)	9-2	BK-46 (6)	Paimio
19:00	Vieira Figueira 24', 34', 58', 75'; Lempiäinen 36', 54'; Duman K 50'; Soares Alhadas Rodrigues 67', 78'	Report	Kemboi 22'; Sundholm 86'	Stadium: Soikka TN; Attendance: 50; Referee: Elvedin Fiso

14 March 2026	JIK (7)	0-4	EIF/Akademi (5)	Jomala
17:00		Report	Gottberg 8'; Hamdi 60'; Estlander O 69', 78'	Stadium: Vikingavallen konstgräs Attendance: 0 Referee: Robert Lindqvist

15 March 2026	FC HIK (6)	1-2	ÅCF (5)	Hanko
14:00	Bushi 18'	Report	Snicker E 73'; Snicker J 77'	Stadium: Rukki 1 TN; Attendance: 150; Referee: Niilo Heikkinen

15 March 2026	MaPS 2 (7)	0-4	PiPS (5)	Naantali
19:00		Report	Rogers 71'; Pllana 74'; Nurmi 81', 84'	Stadium: Karvetti TN; Attendance: 50; Referee: Dzemal Dzebo

18 March 2026	TPK (7)	0-9	SalPa 2 (5)	Turku
20:00		Report	Lautiala 32'; Koski M 48', 52', 86', 90+9'; Väkeväinen 52', 77', 81'; Selnius 90+6'	Stadium: Kupittaa 5 TN; Attendance: 40; Referee: Gabriel Anton

19 March 2026	PoFu United (8)	0-4	TuWe (6)	Turku
20:00		Report	Ochoa Inga 9', 54'; Korbelainen 29', 34'	Stadium: Kupittaa 5 TN; Attendance: 30; Referee: L Mati Sarmad

19 March 2026	Velehot (8)	0-3	Jyske (7)	Naantali
20:15		Report	Salin M 39'; Lehtola 80'; Sorri 89'	Stadium: Karvetti TN; Attendance: 67; Referee: Gabriel Anton

=== Group 4 (Tampere, Häme, Pori, Rauma) ===
4 March 2026	Ilves/3 (6)	2-1	FC Haka j. (5)	Tampere
20:00	Lymarenko 34'; Leinonen 90'	Report	Al Feily 43'	Stadium: Tammelan stadion TN; Attendance: 0 Referee: Mikko Särkiniemi

7 March 2026	ViiPV (8)	0-6	Ylöjärvi United FC (5)	Valkeakoski
20:30		Report	Rintala 6'; Kallio 29', 30', 32'; Kotti 54'; Keskitalo 60'	Stadium: Palloiluhalli TN; Attendance: 50; Referee: Mikko Lähteenmäki

8 March 2026	FC Ulvila /2 (8)	0-5	VaKP (6)	Pori
19:30		Report	Rautanen 30', 53'; (o.g.) 52', 76'; Mattila 77'	Stadium: UK-Tekonurmi; Attendance: 30; Referee: Miro Leppäkoski

12 March 2026	Tampere United/3 (7)	0-5	NoPS (5)	Nokia
20:15		Report	Lehti 3'; Ojajärvi 24'; Kälvi E 30'; Rantaneva 45+1'; Paukkeri 81'	Stadium: Menkala TN; Attendance: 20; Referee: Niko Parviainen

14 March 2026	TOVE (6)	2-2 (5-6 p)	FC Eurajoki (6)	Pori
12:15	Malmivuori 69'; Storberg 80'	Report	Mäki-Iso 59'; Gustafsson 88'	Stadium: UK-Tekonurmi; Attendance: 20; Referee: Henrik Grönblom
	Penalties
	Kontio (penalty scored); Malmivuori (penalty scored); Sulonen (penalty scored); Laine (penalty missed); Mäkelä (penalty scored); Meronen Ol (penalty scored); Marttila (penalty missed)		Gustafsson (penalty missed); Pertola (penalty scored); Niiranen (penalty scored); Mäki-Iso (penalty scored); Vainio (penalty scored); Välimäki (penalty scored); Laihonen (penalty scored)

14 March 2026	TamFu (7)	1-1 (4-3 p)	FC Lasten 2 (6)	Tampere
17:00	Yliluoma 51'	Report	Farhad 69'	Stadium: Kauppi 3 TN talvikenttä Attendance: 15; Referee: Niklas Hölttä
	Penalties
	Niemi (penalty scored); Visuri (penalty scored); Heikkinen (penalty scored); Säkkinen (penalty missed); Yliluoma (penalty scored)		Soli (penalty missed); Hanhiniemi (penalty scored); Lempinen (penalty scored); Farhad (penalty scored); Haavisto (penalty missed)

15 March 2026	Ylöjärvi United FC/2 (7)	2-7	FC LeKi (5)	Tampere
14:00	Skyttä 33'; Hyyryläinen 50'	Report	Chidi 23'; Vaittinen 45+2', 78'; Malekyar 73'; Eidet 81', 83', 85'	Stadium: Kauppi 2 TN talvikenttä Attendance: 50; Referee: Leo Oksanen

15 March 2026	PiPo-79 (6)	1-3	FC Kangasala (6)	Tampere
18:30	Häkkinen 3'	Report	Järvi 52'; Juurikivi 66'; Uski 86'	Stadium: Kauppi 3 TN talvikenttä Attendance: 25; Referee: Mikko Särkiniemi

15 March 2026	KOOVEE (8)	1-3	Ilves/4 (7)	Tampere
19:00	Lähteenmäki L 15'	Report	Sallila 66'; Chouaib 82'; Palomäki 90'	Stadium: Kauppi 2 TN talvikenttä Attendance: 0 Referee: Niko Parviainen

15 March 2026	Gmestarit (7)	2-3	Fish United (5)	Tampere
19:30	Seppälä 30'; Baruffa 38'	Report	Akalazu 16'; Laouini I 59'; Koroma 68'	Stadium: Kauppi 1 TN talvikenttä Attendance: 50; Referee: Hannu Pajunen

15 March 2026	EuPa 2 (7)	0-2	ACE/2 (6)	Eura
19:45		Report	Carlson 20'; Huhtala 90+5'	Stadium: OP-Areena TN; Attendance: 50; Referee: Petri Viljanen

15 March 2026	Loiske Visa (7)	0-7	Tampere United/2 (5)	Tampere
20:00		Report	Kuula 4', 72'; Sarlin 41'; Trawally 75', 90+5'; Hätönen 81'; Lehtilä 90'	Stadium: Tammelan stadion TN; Attendance: 20; Referee: Juha Myllyoja

16 March 2026	Nasta (7)	0-8	Karhu-Futis (6)	Nakkila
19:00		Report	Ranta 5', 22', 30'; Salmi 18'; Varhelahti 21'; Lepistö 49'; Tähkä 66', 81'	Stadium: Liikuntakeskus TN; Attendance: 100; Referee: Samuil Georgiev

16 March 2026	MouMa (8)	0-17	TPV/2 (5)	Tampere
20:45		Report	Auvinen 12', 36', 48', 77', 82'; Kykyri 24', 33', 34', 41', 81'; Olander 38'; Rantala 43'; Lymarenko 57'; Manninen 68', 72', 88', 90+2'	Stadium: Pirkkahalli C TN; Attendance: 62; Referee: Pulkkinen Petteri

18 March 2026	TPV/3 (7)	0-9	ACE (5)	Tampere
19:30		Report	Halme 10', 65'; Tuomaranta 14', 28', 49'; Knuuttila 24'; Tast P 67'; Hannola 74'; Malmivaara 83'	Stadium: Kauppi 3 TN talvikenttä Attendance: 20; Referee: Aleksi Kuusenmäki

18 March 2026	HJS/sininen (8)	0-17	TP-T (5)	Hämeenlinna
20:00		Report	Virtanen E 10'; Juhola 16'; Yüksek 21', 70', 71', 83'; Nauska 26'; Paavola 33'; Nedjefi 43', 48'; Kuusela 53'; Virtanen A 62', 65', 79', 88'; Pukkila 76', 89'	Stadium: Pulleri TN 1 Attendance: 200; Referee: Pasi Uschanov

20 March 2026	Ylöjärven Ilves (7)	0-5	FC Lasten (5)	Ylöjärvi
18:30		Report	Chaudhry 10'; Muikku 24'; Järvinen A 45', 86'; Harala 64'	Stadium: Soppeenharju TN; Attendance: 93; Referee: Hannu Pajunen

21 March 2026	JanPa (6)	2-3	Loiske (5)	Turenki
14:00	Pruuki O 20', 90+3'	Report	Viitaharju 28'; Huvinen 36'; Laakso 55'	Stadium: Tekonurmi; Attendance: 150; Referee: Onni Kaukiainen

22 March 2026	PP-70 (8)	2-5	Messukylä United (7)	Tampere
19:30	Sola 50'; Granroth 86'	Report	Kuorilehto A 3', 28', 44', 56'; Luoma 83'	Stadium: Kauppi 1 TN talvikenttä Attendance: 0 Referee: Niko Parviainen

=== Group 5 (Uusimaa) ===
4 March 2026	RiPS (5)	0-4	JäPS/47 (5)	Tammela
19:00		Report	Vanhanen 20'; (o.g.) 24'; Ahmed 76'; Tom Mikkonen 80'	Stadium: Eerikkilä-halli TN; Attendance: 19; Referee: Sami Katko

4 March 2026	Akilles (6)	1-6	FC Futura (5)	Sipoo
19:45	Larjavaara A 18'	Report	Keihäri 25', 50'; Rouvila 51'; Hyypiä 53'; Pylkkänen 63'; Kouva 76'	Stadium: Söderkulla TN; Attendance: 100; Referee: Unto Tuominen

13 March 2026	JäPS/Akatemia (7)	0-5	LoPa (5)	Järvenpää
19:00		Report	Hirvonen 48', 51', 87'; Kaunisto 67'; Pajunen Jo 90'	Stadium: Keskusurheilukenttä TN; Attendance: 25; Referee: Matti Blom

13 March 2026	NuPS (5)	0-1	TuPS (5)	Nummela
19:00		Report	Pakkala 76'	Stadium: Auto-Huiput Areena TN; Attendance: 223; Referee: Mats Helkamo

15 March 2026	TuPS/Skavaböle (6)	0-1	KelA (6)	Tuusula
18:00		Report	Rosendahl 90'	Stadium: Hyrylä UK TN; Attendance: 0 Referee: Limon Kryeziu

17 March 2026	JäPS/U23 (6)	3-2	ToBK (6)	Järvenpää
18:30	Lehtinen 12', 42'; Guidugli 16'	Report	Carlson 41'; Eriksson 79'	Stadium: Keskusurheilukenttä TN; Attendance: 40; Referee: Joni Juntto

21 March 2026	FC Kulmakikka (8)	2-3	Sibbo-Vargarna (5)	Järvenpää
14:00	Ntare 40'; Iljanto 75'	Report	Camara 10', 19'; Viitanen M 51'	Stadium: Monitoimihalli TN; Attendance: 0 Referee: Limon Kryeziu

21 March 2026	RiPS/2 (7)	8-3	JäPS/United (7)	Tervakoski
17:00	Myllärinen 3'; Murtonen 15', 54', 75', 83'; Larkovuo 25'; Somerharju 70'; Martinkauppi 88'	Report	Ripatti R 59'; Eseigbe 60'; Sweidan 62'	Stadium: Tekonurmi; Attendance: 112; Referee: Aki Tauriainen

=== Group 6 (Lahti, Kymenlaakso, South Karelia) ===
21 February 2026	KJP (5)	4-5	HaPK Edustus (5)	Kuusankoski
14:00	Pellilä 45+1'; Kortelainen 51'; Rytilahti 52'; Uotila 90+5'	Report	Atemengue Awono 29', 69'; Saikkonen 38', 66'; Dufva 75'	Stadium: Sami Hyypiä Areena TN; Attendance: 100; Referee: Hiwa Haghi Shamsaddin

8 March 2026	PeKa (5)	2-1	FC Lahti/69 (5)	Kotka
14:00	Bajrovic 20'; Kaitainen 51'	Report	Kämäräinen 69'	Stadium: Arto Tolsa Areena; Attendance: 86; Referee: Saku Metsämuuronen

11 March 2026	FC Lahti/3 (7)	1-3	Kumu (5)	Lahti
21:00	Loman 16'	Report	Joutjärvi 28'; Sutela 35'; Sippula 75'	Stadium: Mukkula Halli TN; Attendance: 42; Referee: Anssi Juurinen

13 March 2026	Lappee JK (6)	0-2	KoPa (5)	Lappeenranta
20:00		Report	Sinkkonen 62'; Heschung T 90+3'	Stadium: Amis TN; Attendance: 80; Referee: Anton Korttinen

15 March 2026	FC Tajuboys (8)	1-1 (2-4 p)	KyPa (7)	Lahti
16:00	Helenius E 29'	Report	Turunen 48'	Stadium: Kisapuisto 1 TN; Attendance: 0 Referee: Ilkka Mäkelä
	Penalties
	Helenius E (penalty missed); Multanen (penalty missed); Saarinen (penalty scored); Helenius D (penalty scored)		Parpala (penalty scored); Vantola (penalty scored); Peltoniemi (penalty scored); Hytti (penalty scored)

15 March 2026	PoPo (8)	4-2	Kultsu FC (5)	Kotka
19:15	Abahassine 13', 37'; Lauretsalo 74'; Ramadingaye 90'	Report	Pakkanen 76'; Huunonen 89'	Stadium: Urheiluhalli TN; Attendance: 67; Referee: Turo Veini

17 March 2026	KarPo (7)	4-6	PaPe (7)	Kotka
20:00	Harju 9', 79', 90+4'; Lassila 77'	Report	Rämä 14', 17', 35', 51'; Eskelinen 67'; Forsström 90'	Stadium: Urheiluhalli TN; Attendance: 33; Referee: Atte Henriksson

17 March 2026	RPS Lions (6)	1-4	LauTP (5)	Imatra
20:15	Tossavainen 69'	Report	Hjerppe 51', 57'; Lattu A 74'; Hiltunen 89'	Stadium: Ukonniemi-areena TN; Attendance: 67; Referee: Anton Korttinen

18 March 2026	HaTP (8)	0-7	LauTP/2 (5)	Kuusankoski
19:30		Report	Vanhanen 9', 26', 59'; Matilainen 56'; Heinonen 73', 90+2'; Vilkki 89'	Stadium: Sami Hyypiä Areena TN; Attendance: 17; Referee: Eemeli Piirala

=== Group 7 (Central Finland, South Savo, North Karelia) ===
22 February 2026	Huima/Urho 2 (6)	0-6	NiemU (5)	Äänekoski
18:00		Report	Sottinen 17', 43'; Levy 34'; Kaasinen 55'; Laatikainen 69', 88'	Stadium: Ylipainehalli TN; Attendance: 49; Referee: Jere Lemettinen

28 February 2026	KeuPa (5)	0-5	JIPPO-j/PunaMusta (5)	Leppävesi
15:30		Report	Turunen 10', 64'; Purmonen 31'; Sallinen E 51', 60'	Stadium: Leppäveden LP Ylipainehalli; Attendance: 31; Referee: Vilho Jokinen

28 February 2026	JPS (5)	1-0	FC Metso (5)	Jyväskylä
16:15	Rintalo 30'	Report		Stadium: Huhtahalli TN; Attendance: 200; Referee: Ilja Timonen

7 March 2026	FC Marski (6)	0-4	Komeetat (5)	Mikkeli
14:30		Report	Seppä 17'; Huntus 20'; Jaroma 67'; Hamawand 77'	Stadium: Mikkelin jp-halli TN; Attendance: 22; Referee: Tommi Vitikainen

7 March 2026	OuPa (6)	2-0	Edustus STPS (5)	Joensuu
19:15	Klimov D 52', 57'	Report		Stadium: Hope Areena TN; Attendance: 11; Referee: Vladislav Dirgin

13 March 2026	Nousu (6)	0-1	FCV/Reds (6)	Jyväskylä
20:15		Report	Parkkinen 60'	Stadium: Vehkahalli TN; Attendance: 97; Referee: Vilho Jokienen

14 March 2026	FC Soho (6)	2-4	SaPa (5)	Jyväskylä
14:00	Ylinampa 52'; Kauhanen 60'	Report	Liimatainen 42', 44', 46'; Sipinen 90'	Stadium: Vehkahalli TN; Attendance: 35; Referee: Kimmo Purontakanen

14 March 2026	Komeetat/Piuku (6)	0-2	MiPK (5)	Leppävesi
20:00		Report	Kortman 40'; Dolia 62'	Stadium: Leppäveden LP Ylipainehalli; Attendance: 50; Referee: Aaro Laurila

15 March 2026	MuurY (7)	4-1	PoPS-78 (6)	Leppävesi
14:00	Nejlik 21'; Venäläinen 41'; Anhava 53'; Seppänen 85'	Report	Fayt 75'	Stadium: Leppäveden LP Ylipainehalli; Attendance: 20; Referee: Henri Kangasmetsä

=== Group 8 (North Savo, Kainuu) ===
21 February 2026	Kings SC (5)	1-2	KajHa (5)	Kuopio
17:30	Nikkanen 81'	Report	Bardiro 14', 45+2'	Stadium: Lippumäki Ylipainehalli TN; Attendance: 30; Referee: Niki Berg

6 March 2026	ToU (5)	0-1	PK-37 (5)	Kuopio
20:00		Report	Goman 54'	Stadium: Lippumäki Ylipainehalli TN; Attendance: 26; Referee: Joni Kortelainen

8 March 2026	SuPS (7)	1-6	Kuopion Elo (6)	Kuopio
14:00	Moilanen M 88'	Report	Lindström 17'; Pekonen 28'; Lipponen 52'; Haaranen 58'; (o.g.) 60'; Hartikainen E 73'	Stadium: Lippumäki Ylipainehalli TN; Attendance: 30; Referee: Kaapo Tapio

14 March 2026	KuKi (6)	1-8	KaPa (5)	Kuopio
19:30	Rasmus 58'	Report	Clinton 9', 28'; Evo 11', 48'; Torabihaghighi 34'; Izquierdo Garcia 43'; Kinnunen 85'; Toivainen 89'	Stadium: Lippumäki Ylipainehalli TN; Attendance: 0 Referee: Vili Taipalinen

18 March 2026	WJK (6)	0-1	Zulimanit (5)	Varkaus
18:30		Report	Kauhanen 19'	Stadium: Kisapuisto TN; Attendance: 100; Referee: Patrick Kuosmanen

=== Group 9 (Ostrobothnia, South Ostrobothnia, Central Ostrobothnia) ===
28 February 2026	LUJA (6)	4-2	Sporting Kristina (5)	Seinäjoki
21:00	Haapoja 14', 33'; Plukka 73'; Bengs Em 83'	Report	Barladym 21'; Vu 48'	Stadium: WallSport-Areena TN; Attendance: 50; Referee: Miki Kalliokoski

1 March 2026	K-Pallo (6)	1-10	SIF (5)	Bennäs
11:00	Nikupaavo J 64'	Report	Kloo 16'; Kronholm 24'; Louhema 30', 67'; Björkqvist 36'; Kankaanpää 39'; Ljungkvist F 44'; Hiekkanen B 61', 88'	Stadium: LKI Arena TN; Attendance: 1000; Referee: Luke Williams

6 March 2026	Norrvalla FF (6)	1-5	VIFK (5)	Vaasa
18:00	Savchenko 1'	Report	Birhane M 21'; Puhakainen 28'; Mylläri 39'; Osteråker 59', 90+6'	Stadium: Veo Arena; Attendance: 50; Referee: Marko Ranne

7 March 2026	Esse IK (6)	3-5	SJK-j (5)	Bennäs
15:30	Sundström 23', 89'; Löv 90+4'	Report	Husseini 27'; Iso-Tuisku 39'; Rantanen 48'; Lampinen Ar 52'; Välimäki 73'	Stadium: LKI Arena TN; Attendance: 50; Referee: Agron Salihu

7 March 2026	Kaskö IK (7)	3-2	KPS (6)	Närpes
17:30	Pjevo Ha 60'; (o.g.) 66'; Mujkic 86'	Report	Kangasvieri 3'; Laitinen 9'	Stadium: Sparbanken Arena TN; Attendance: 0 Referee: Jami Verronen

9 March 2026	FC Sääripotku (5)	0-5	FC Kiisto (5)	Kokkola
20:30		Report	Päivänurmi 60', 82'; Antila 71'; (o.g.) 76'; Nisula 86'	Stadium: Kipparihall TN; Attendance: 60; Referee: Mikko Ojala

14 March 2026	LappBK (7)	6-2	Pedesi Vikings (6)	Kristinestad
15:00	Mattila 16', 36', 69'; Hietikko Ja 20'; Mäki 25'; Teirfolk 31'	Report	Rautamo 22', 32'	Stadium: Braheplan TN; Attendance: 147; Referee: Valtteri Huhta

15 March 2026	VPV (5)	2-2 (7-6 p)	NIK (5)	Vaasa
17:00	Hautala I 55'; Keskinen 81'	Report	Tema 35'; Odongo 51'	Stadium: Kamratvallen TN; Attendance: 30; Referee: Vahidin Bajic

16 March 2026	IK (7)	3-4	FC Ylivieska (5)	Kuortane
20:30	Haaparanta 4'; Puska 42', 76'	Report	Pihlaja 32', 50', 56', 82'	Stadium: Ilkka-Areena TN; Attendance: 5 Referee: Miki Kalliokoski

17 March 2026	IK Myran (6)	3-7	Virkiä (5)	Kokkola
21:00	Wentin 18'; Pulkkinen 51'; Salonen 54'	Report	Niemelä Juh 23', 37', 39', 41', 56'; Takala A 34'; Szlapa 79'	Stadium: Kipparihall TN; Attendance: 115; Referee: Tony Mäki

18 March 2026	Sisu (6)	3-1	APV (6)	Seinäjoki
19:30	Aden 56'; Palomäki 81', 90+1'	Report	Meritaivas 73'	Stadium: OmaSp Stadion; Attendance: 55; Referee: Marko Ranne

19 March 2026	BK-48 (6)	4-4 (5-3 p)	KoPo (6)	Vaasa
19:30	Elenius R 3', 11'; Chidobe 48', 87'	Report	Korkatti 4', 35'; Paananen 55'; Lahti O 67'	Stadium: Kamratvallen TN; Attendance: 100; Referee: Tero Koskela
	Penalties
	Mamenywa (penalty scored); Toivio (penalty scored); Chidobe (penalty scored); Rinne (penalty scored); Forsgren T (penalty scored)		Möttönen (penalty scored); Korkatti (penalty scored); Hautamäki (penalty missed); Lahti O (penalty scored)

=== Group 10 (North Ostrobothnia, Lapland, Kemi) ===
21 February 2026	Heinäpään Hanhet (6)	5-1	HauPa/2 (6)	Oulu
14:15	Raappana 29', 39'; Koivujärvi 35'; Niemeläinen 45+1'; Korhonen 65'	Report	Rukajärvi 14'	Stadium: Heinäpää PH TN; Attendance: 80; Referee: Paavo Nikkari

7 March 2026	FC RIO GRANDE (7)	1-1 (4-2 p)	OTP (6)	Rovaniemi
14:30	Soppela E 10'	Report	Kumbusa 4'	Stadium: Ounashalli TN; Attendance: 50; Referee: Mikko Rantala
	Penalties
	Ronkainen (penalty scored); Hakala (penalty missed); Olabisi (penalty scored); Ojaniemi (penalty scored); Paukku (penalty scored)		Kokkonen (penalty scored); Heikkilä (penalty missed); Isokangas (penalty scored); Pelkonen (penalty missed)

7 March 2026	SoPa (6)	1-3	KTU (6)	Rovaniemi
16:45	Mäki O 29'	Report	Jussila 25', 50'; Hyvärinen Sak 90'	Stadium: Ounashalli TN; Attendance: 10; Referee: Suvi Tulonen

8 March 2026	RoPo (5)	6-2	PonPa (5)	Rovaniemi
14:10	Ruotsalainen 14'; Luiro 24', 39', 51'; Irvankoski E 35'; Memonen 74'	Report	Kokko K 16'; Matkaselkä Verneri 25'	Stadium: Ounashalli TN; Attendance: 63; Referee: Mikko Rantala

8 March 2026	Hercules-j (5)	1-1 (3-4 p)	FC Santa Claus (5)	Oulu
15:15	Väänänen 40'	Report	Pure 44'	Stadium: Heinäpää PH TN; Attendance: 30; Referee: Timi Kärki
	Penalties
	Hakola (penalty scored); Kainu J (penalty scored); Syla (penalty scored); Siivikko (penalty missed); Holappa (penalty missed)		Inkeroinen (penalty missed); Vaarala (penalty scored); Frst (penalty scored); Rendic (penalty scored); Salmela (penalty scored)

14 March 2026	OuTa (6)	1-5	HauPa (5)	Oulu
10:15	Haapala 8'	Report	Ervasti 29'; Viheriävaara V 31'; Seppälä 62', 76'; Oksanen 63'	Stadium: Heinäpää PH TN; Attendance: 30; Referee: Tom Prové

15 March 2026	KKP (7)	0-6	Villan Pojat (5)	Oulu
13:45		Report	Nyang 13', 72'; Blomster 16'; Luolavirta 58', 64'; Velásquez Mollehuara 90'	Stadium: Heinäpää PH TN; Attendance: 50; Referee: Lauri Roine

18 March 2026	OuJK (6)	2-5	KePS (5)	Oulu
21:15	Kaijansaari 47'; Heikkinen 81'	Report	Kupari 61'; Kuusisto 74', 76', 90+1'; Modepoola 87'	Stadium: Heinäpää PH TN; Attendance: 15; Referee: Paavo Nikkari

== Round 2 ==
The draw for the second round was made on 4 March 2026 at 12:00 PM (Finnish Time) on the Finnish Football Association's (Palloliito) YouTube channel. 120 teams participate in this round. They are divided into seven groups based on geography.

Number of teams per tier still in competition
Veikkausliiga (1)	Ykkösliiga (2)	Ykkönen (3)	Kakkonen (4)	Kolmonen (5)	Nelonen (6)	Vitonen (7)	Kutonen (8)	Seiska (9)	M35 (+35)	Total
12 / 12	9 / 9	10 / 10	25 / 25	66 / 91	31 / 88	21 / 100	1 / 65	0 / 12	1 / 3	176 / 415

=== Group 1 ===
21 March 2026	Toukolan Teräs (5)	4-1	FC Kontu (5)	Helsinki
17:00	Jouini 37'; Määttä V 63'; Söderholm 87'; Rinne 90+3'	Report	Gröhn 71'	Stadium: Tali halli TN; Attendance: 200; Referee: Emil Kohvakka

22 March 2026	Ponnistus (5)	2-7	VJS/Akatemia (5)	Helsinki
10:00	Smith 30'; Abdi 76'	Report	Ketonen 25'; Ojala 50'; Fors 53', 55', 56'; Salo N 56'; Korhonen 59'	Stadium: Töölö PK 1 TN; Attendance: 30; Referee: Salim Ghandagha

24 March 2026	IF Gnistan/3 (6)	1-11	Töölön Taisto (5)	Helsinki
21:00	Rantala 21'	Report	Appelqvist 3', 18', 83'; Varjovirta 45+1'; Laitinen 47'; Långbacka 64'; Kuusela 67', 70', 81'; Happonen 88'; Klinga M 90'	Stadium: Oulunkylä 1 TN; Attendance: 19; Referee: Mikko Mörö

25 March 2026	JäPS/U23 (6)	1-4	PPJ/Lauttasaari (5)	Järvenpää
18:30	Faye 81'	Report	Ogorodnikov 50'; Layne 68'; Kari 71'; Heiermann 89'	Stadium: Keskusurheilukenttä TN; Attendance: 30; Referee: Vilho Jokinen

25 March 2026	LePa (5)	3-1	Atlantis FC/Akatemia (5)	Espoo
20:00	Marady 1'; Petäjä 12'; Kuuppo 27'	Report	Boroduska 76'	Stadium: Leppävaara 2 TN; Attendance: 25; Referee: Antti Kolehmainen

26 March 2026	KelA (6)	1-1 (7-8 p)	Jokerit FC (6)	Järvenpää
19:00	Al-Helli 90+2'	Report	Tukiainen 85'	Stadium: Keskusurheilukenttä TN; Attendance: 50; Referee: Salim Ghandagha
	Penalties
	Heinonen (penalty missed); Rosendahl (penalty scored); Eronen (penalty missed); Peltoranta (penalty scored); Karhu (penalty scored); Vehmas (penalty scored); Raassina (penalty scored); Al-Helli (penalty scored); Puttonen (penalty scored); Laurila (penalty missed)		Heinolainen (penalty missed); Pelayo Sandoval (penalty scored); Tuovinen (penalty scored); Koskinen (penalty missed); Salmi (penalty scored); Pynnönen (penalty scored); Jaakkola (penalty scored); Ganesh (penalty scored); Viljanen (penalty scored); Luak (penalty scored)

26 March 2026	FC Korso/United (7)	1-3	StaPa De Royale (6)	Kaleva
19:00	Kauppala 88'	Report	Räsänen 39'; Sankkinen 69'; Kivelä 86'	Stadium: Kaleva UP TN; Attendance: 20; Referee: Tom Lindberg

26 March 2026	IF Gnistan/M35 (+35)	5-0	PeKa (5)	Helsinki
20:00	Korhonen 8'; Sihvola 41'; Mustonen 56'; Anttila 83', 90+1'	Report		Stadium: Oulunkylä 1 TN; Attendance: 40; Referee: Fereidoun Mohammadi

27 March 2026	JäPS/47 (5)	2-2 (4-1 p)	MK-United (5)	Järvenpää
19:00	Autio 28'; Wilkman 45+1'	Report	Jrad 31'; Nariman 79'	Stadium: Keskusurheilukenttä TN; Attendance: 107; Referee: Emil Kohvakka
	Penalties
	Lainpelto (penalty scored); Abdelali (penalty scored); Avo (penalty scored); Vornanen (penalty scored)		Nguyen He (penalty missed); Najat (penalty missed); Jrad (penalty scored)

27 March 2026	Vesa (6)	1-2	Valtti (5)	Helsinki
20:00	Mäkela 21'	Report	(o.g.) 27'; Berisha 90+2'	Stadium: Töölö PK 1 TN; Attendance: 50; Referee: Balla Seidou

27 March 2026	FC POHU/CJ United (7)	2-1	Pöxyt/TNT (6)	Helsinki
20:00	Souris 16'; Pirttiniemi 79'	Report	Kuusisto 83'	Stadium: Töölö PK 3 TN; Attendance: 50; Referee: Kalle Pitkänen

27 March 2026	LoPa (5)	1-0	Olarin Kiksi (6)	Lohja
20:00	Sonko 23'	Report		Stadium: Taimisto TN; Attendance: 150; Referee: Jukka Aakko

28 March 2026	SUMU (6)	0-4	SUMU/sob (6)	Helsinki
15:00		Report	Komisarov 28'; Ingoli 41', 64'; Abdi J 83'	Stadium: Talli halli TN; Attendance: 58; Referee: Joel Pilli

28 March 2026	SAPA (6)	2-6	FC POHU/Hurjin (6)	Helsinki
19:00	Mäkela 78'; Palosaari 88'	Report	Reunanen 52'; Stergakis 59'; Husu 70'; Niskanen 84'; Kurkinen 85'; Hämäläinen 90'	Stadium: Töölö PK 1 TN; Attendance: 25; Referee: Pasi Kangas

28 March 2026	FC Germania (7)	2-2 (5-4 p)	KOPSE/VI (7)	Helsinki
19:00	Oyewo 8'; Anye 10'	Report	Rantala 20'; Uusimäki 90+3'	Stadium: Töölö PK 3 TN; Attendance: 17; Referee: Balla Seidou
	Penalties
	Oyewo (penalty scored); Bisschop (penalty scored); Suchodolski (penalty scored); Kananen (penalty scored); Boukrim (penalty scored)		Rantala (penalty scored); Uusimäki (penalty missed); Peltonen (penalty scored); Kaarnasaari (penalty scored); Saarela (penalty scored)

28 March 2026	ST4Y (6)	0-5	HPS/2 (5)	Puotila
19:00		Report	Pihkala 18'; Tast 28', 60'; Kaivola 61', 71'	Stadium: Hartwall Sport Areena TN; Attendance: 1 Referee: Tom Lindberg

29 March 2026	FC Kiffen/3 (6)	1-0	HooGee (5)	Helsinki
10:00	Nyroos 90'	Report		Stadium: Töölö PK 3 TN; Attendance: 30; Referee: Joni Taipale

29 March 2026	AFG united (7)	2-3	Mando United (7)	Vantaa
15:00	Sadeghi 27', 29'	Report	Touray 7', 66'; Penttinen 14'	Stadium: Rajakylä TN; Attendance: 30; Referee: Benjamin Lamberg

29 March 2026	HJK/Kantsu (6)	1-4	TuPS (5)	Helsinki
16:15	Mäkinen 76'	Report	Leinonen 30'; Haapalainen 63'; Halme 74'; Ravi 90+2'	Stadium: Töölö PK 5 TN (Sahara); Attendance: 13; Referee: Otto Helin

29 March 2026	RiPS/2 (7)	1-1 (2-3 p)	Loiske (5)	Riihimäki
17:00	Murtonen 49'	Report	Viitaharju 90+1'	Stadium: Keskuskenttä TN; Attendance: 110; Referee: Aki Tauriainen
	Penalties
	Siivonen (penalty missed); Larkovuo (penalty scored); Tiilola (penalty missed); Somerharju (penalty scored); Myllärinen (penalty missed)		Helander (penalty scored); Ylä-Peräinen (penalty scored); Viitaharju (penalty missed); Kukkonen (penalty missed); Laakso (penalty scored)

29 March 2026	FC Haxi (6)	0-2	FC Futura (5)	Vantaa
17:00		Report	Hasan Farah 55'; Zvaalden 73'	Stadium: Tikkurila TN; Attendance: 79; Referee: Pasi Kangas

29 March 2026	Gilla FC (5)	5-1	KY United (7)	Vantaa
19:30	Mettälä 34', 82'; Sitala 40'; Tammilehto 52'; Markkanen 89'	Report	Lehmuskoski 17'	Stadium: Tikkurila TN; Attendance: 0 Referee: Artjom Mondonen

29 March 2026	PETO (7)	0-4	MPS (5)	Paloheinä
21:00		Report	Kayse Mohamed 28'; Alajoki 44', 60', 82'	Stadium: Briotech Arena; Attendance: 30; Referee: Strasdosky Otewa

31 March 2026	TiPS/U21 (5)	3-0	Sibbo-Vargarna (5)	Vantaa
19:00	Tuomola 25'; Pyhämäki 65'; Mallat 84'	Report		Stadium: Tikkurila TN; Attendance: 80; Referee: Joonas Kovapohja

=== Group 2 ===
21 March 2026	PIF (5)	6-0	PiPS (5)	Parainen
13:00	Löfman 5'; Svanberg 20'; Lehtinen S 40', 75'; Adolfsson 88'; Abrahamsson 90'	Report		Stadium: Aktia LKV Arena TN; Attendance: 112; Referee: Lina Lehtovaara

23 March 2026	Jyske (7)	0-5	VG-62 (5)	Naantali
20:00		Report	Leppänen O 7'; Pentikäinen 54'; Tommila 72', 87'; Ojala 83'	Stadium: Karvetti TN; Attendance: 0 Referee: L Mati Sarmad

26 March 2026	Peimari Utd 2 (7)	2-3	SalPa 2 (5)	Sauvo
19:00	Sjöroos 52'; Mensah 90'	Report	Väkeväinen 45'; Rovio 67'; Selnius 90+6'	Stadium: Hakkispaana TN; Attendance: 40; Referee: Aleksi Keronen

26 March 2026	TPS 2 (7)	1-1 (4-3 p)	TuWe (6)	Turku
20:15	Myllys 16'	Report	Vihilehti 58'	Stadium: Kupittaa 2 TN; Attendance: 35; Referee: Frans Sagulin
	Penalties
	Rantanen (penalty scored); Seppänen (penalty missed); Seppänen (penalty scored); Joshi (penalty scored); Koskinen (penalty scored)		Kuparinen (penalty scored); Vihilehti (penalty missed); Chacon (penalty scored); Laakso (penalty scored); Garagani (penalty missed)

27 March 2026	ÅCF (5)	0-4	Masku (5)	Naantali
20:15		Report	Kyläheiko 8', 62'; Kuusto 45+1'; Lehtonen J 71'	Stadium: Karvetti TN; Attendance: 70; Referee: Topi Laakso

28 March 2026	EIF/Akademi (5)	2-0	KaaPo (5)	Tammisaari
14:00	Hamdi 36'; Heinämaa 90+5'	Report		Stadium: Ekenäs Sparbank Arena TN; Attendance: 130; Referee: Youssef Raghib

=== Group 3 ===
22 March 2026	TamFu (7)	1-1 (1-3 p)	VaKP (6)	Tampere
17:00	Metso V 68'	Report	Rautanen 23'	Stadium: Messukylä TN; Attendance: 25; Referee: Juha Franssila
	Penalties
	Laaksonen (penalty scored); Visuri (penalty missed); Heikkinen (penalty missed); Minkkinen (penalty missed)		Salonen (penalty scored); Tuominen (penalty scored); Collin (penalty scored); Lintunen (penalty missed)

25 March 2026	TP-T (5)	0-2	Ylöjärvi United FC (5)	Tampere
19:00		Report	Kotti 15'; Kallio 51'	Stadium: Pyynikin urheilukenttä TN; Attendance: 44; Referee: Lauri Luomala

25 March 2026	FC Eurajoki (6)	1-1 (4-5 p)	FC LeKi (5)	Eurajoki
19:30	Ciastek D 90+1'	Report	Seaward 38'	Stadium: Tekonurmi; Attendance: 10; Referee: Vasile Marchis
	Penalties
	Vainio (penalty scored); Pertola (penalty scored); Niiranen (penalty missed); Koski (penalty missed); Musov (penalty scored); Valtanen (penalty scored); Tirronen (penalty missed)		Vaittinen (penalty missed); Ndjock (penalty scored); Hoffrén (penalty missed); Burnett (penalty scored); Obeng-Sarpong (penalty scored); Shaffer (penalty scored); Al-fatli (penalty scored)

25 March 2026	ACE/2 (6)	0-6	TPV/2 (5)	Tampere
20:00		Report	Lymarenko 31'; Dos Santos 53'; Hynönen 60'; Auvinen 64', 86'; Asikalainen 66'	Stadium: Messukylä TN; Attendance: 0 Referee: Hannu Pajunen

25 March 2026	Ilves/3 (6)	0-6	Fish United (5)	Tampere
20:00		Report	Akalazu 8'; Laouini B 25', 68'; Oksanen 37'; Laouini I 85'; Karhu 87'	Stadium: Tammelan stadion TN; Attendance: 0 Referee: Mikko Särkiniemi

26 March 2026	Ilves/4 (7)	2-6	Karhu-Futis (6)	Tampere
19:30	Nikkilä 21', 22'	Report	Pihlavisto 12'; Järvinen 52'; Mäkinen 54'; Tähkä 63', 73', 89'	Stadium: Rantaperkiö TN; Attendance: 0 Referee: Lauri Luomala

26 March 2026	FC Lasten (5)	3-1	NoPS (5)	Nokia
20:15	Dieter 44'; Järvinen A 71'; Abruquah 90+5'	Report	Javanmiri 41'	Stadium: Menkala TN; Attendance: 10; Referee: Niko Parviainen

29 March 2026	Messukylä United (7)	0-1	FC Kangasala (6)	Tampere
18:00		Report	Venetjoki 66'	Stadium: Messukylä TN; Attendance: 0 Referee: Niko Parviainen

29 March 2026	Tampere United/2 (5)	1-3	ACE (5)	Tampere
20:00	Trawally 90+3'	Report	Tuomaranta 44'; Eskola 64'; Knuuttila 79'	Stadium: Pirkkahalli C TN; Attendance: 39; Referee: Santtu Simonen

=== Group 4 ===
24 March 2026	KyPa (7)	2-2 (5-3 p)	LauTP (5)	Kotka
20:00	Kuusumäki 44', 65'	Report	Kuivalainen 24', 28'	Stadium: Urheiluhalli TN; Attendance: 15; Referee: Hiwa Haghi Shamsaddin
	Penalties
	Parpala (penalty scored); Vantola (penalty scored); Peltoniemi (penalty scored); Hytti (penalty scored); Turunen (penalty scored)		Riivari (penalty scored); Strengell (penalty scored); Lattu (penalty missed); Kupiainen (penalty scored)

25 March 2026	LauTP/2 (5)	0-3	HaPK Edustus (5)	Lappeenranta
19:00		Report	Kasurinen 22', 41'; Abdullah 73'	Stadium: Lauritsala UK TN; Attendance: 30; Referee: Aleksi Koskinen

26 March 2026	PaPe (7)	1-5	KoPa (5)	Myllykoski
19:30	Rämä 88'	Report	Heschung T 13', 29'; Jantunen 24'; Junnonen 45+2'; Joronen 69'	Stadium: KSOY Stadion TN; Attendance: 23; Referee: Eemeli Piirala

29 March 2026	PoPo (8)	4-0	Kumu (5)	Karhula
17:45	Ramadingaye 19', 76'; Nykänen 26'; Rikberg 50'	Report		Stadium: Keskuskenttä TN; Attendance: 150; Referee: Anssi Juurinen

=== Group 5 ===
26 March 2026	JPS (5)	2-1	MiPK (5)	Jyväskylä
20:15	Thusberg 58'; Rintalo 66'	Report	Korvenpää O 86'	Stadium: Huhtahalli TN; Attendance: 50; Referee: Kimmo Purontakanen

28 March 2026	OuPa (6)	0-4	NiemU (5)	Joensuu
16:00		Report	Sottinen 50', 80'; Korvenpää 52'; Laatikainen 78'	Stadium: Mehtimäki TN; Attendance: 60; Referee: Vladislav Dirgin

28 March 2026	Komeetat (5)	1-3	KajHa (5)	Jyväskylä
18:30	Leipola 84'	Report	Moilanen J 19'; Pedro Alexandre 52'; Bardiro 90+1'	Stadium: Huhtahalli TN; Attendance: 123; Referee: Vilho Jokinen

29 March 2026	KaPa (5)	1-0	Zulimanit (5)	Kajaani
14:00	Evo 21'	Report		Stadium: Liikuntapuisto TN; Attendance: 100; Referee: Konsta Repo

29 March 2026	FCV/Reds (6)	2-3	PK-37 (5)	Jyväskylä
16:15	Hokkanen 34'; Jalava 56'	Report	Hyvärinen 11'; Goman 50'; Kääriäinen A 83'	Stadium: Huhtahalli TN; Attendance: 150; Referee: Henri Pakkanen

29 March 2026	Kuopion Elo (6)	3-1	SaPa (5)	Kuopio
18:30	Pentikäinen 21'; Pekonen 52'; Hartikainen E 70'	Report	Sipinen 90+3'	Stadium: Lippumäki Ylipainehalli TN; Attendance: 60; Referee: Kaapo Tapio

3 April 2026	MuurY (7)	1-4	JIPPO-j/PunaMusta (5)	Muurame
18:00	Tiitta 6'	Report	Sallinen E 51'; Turunen 54'; Stigzelius 71'; Behm 82'	Stadium: Muurame TN; Attendance: 0 Referee: Jere Lemettinen

=== Group 6 ===
26 March 2026	SJK-j (5)	1-1 (3-5 p)	VPV (5)	Seinäjoki
19:00	Kukila To 14'	Report	Rintanen 71'	Stadium: OmaSp Stadion; Attendance: 100; Referee: Miki Kalliokoski
	Penalties
	Iso-Tuisku (penalty missed); Rantanen (penalty scored); Husseini (penalty scored); Kukila (penalty scored)		Ketonen (penalty scored); Särkiniemi (penalty scored); Tiiro (penalty scored); Lausanto (penalty scored); Westergren (penalty scored)

26 March 2026	BK-48 (6)	0-4	FC Ylivieska (5)	Vaasa
19:30		Report	Kemppainen 31'; Pihlaja 67', 81'; Ojala K 80'	Stadium: Kamratvallen TN; Attendance: 30; Referee: Marko Ranne

27 March 2026	VIFK (5)	3-2	SIF (5)	Vaasa
18:00	Nuutinen 13'; Doudi 47', 90+5'	Report	Hiekkanen B 17'; Kankaanpää 90+3'	Stadium: Kamratvallen TN; Attendance: 80; Referee: Vahidin Bajic

27 March 2026	LappBK (7)	2-1	Sisu (6)	Kristinestad
19:00	Enlund 8'; Mattila 36'	Report	Palomäki 49'	Stadium: Braheplan TN; Attendance: 161; Referee: Andre Martinez

28 March 2026	Kaskö IK (7)	0-7	FC Kiisto (5)	Kristinestad
13:00		Report	Päivänurmi 21', 40', 52'; Jabbi 28', 30'; Kainulainen 36'; Ketola 88'	Stadium: Braheplan TN; Attendance: 0 Referee: Petri Honkanen

28 March 2026	LUJA (6)	1-2	Virkiä (5)	Vaasa
17:20	Rinnasto S 68'	Report	Niemelä Juh 21'; Valkama 75'	Stadium: Veo Arena; Attendance: 70; Referee: Marko Ranne

=== Group 7 ===
22 March 2026	FC Santa Claus (5)	3-1	Villan Pojat (5)	Rovaniemi
15:30	Pure 10'; Rendic 34'; Tuisku E 86'	Report	Nyang 41'	Stadium: Ounashalli TN; Attendance: 120; Referee: Mikko Rantala

22 March 2026	FC RIO GRANDE (7)	2-2 (6-7 p)	HauPa (5)	Rovaniemi
19:00	(o.g.) 34'; Ojaniemi 89'	Report	Oksanen 11'; Obagbemiro 23'	Stadium: Ounashalli TN; Attendance: 44; Referee: Joel Chydenius
	Penalties
	Ronkainen (penalty scored); Soppela (penalty scored); Olabisi (penalty scored); Jankeri (penalty scored); Ojaniemi (penalty missed); Hakala (penalty scored); Rytkönen (penalty scored); Töyräs (penalty missed); Värinen (penalty missed)		Obagbemiro (penalty scored); Seppälä (penalty missed); Oksanen (penalty scored); Ervasti (penalty scored); Sarkkinen (penalty scored); Syrjälä A (penalty scored); Siipola (penalty scored); Rauhala (penalty missed); Mahdi (penalty scored)

26 March 2026	KePS (5)	3-3 (3-5 p)	RoPo (5)	Rovaniemi
21:00	Kreivi 24'; Ikäläinen R 45+1'; Åhman V 78'	Report	Irvankoski E 9'; Romakkaniemi 42'; Majander 50'	Stadium: Ounashalli TN; Attendance: 43; Referee: John Wikman
	Penalties
	Åhman V (penalty scored); Kuusisto (penalty scored); Verronen (penalty scored); Ikäläinen R (penalty missed)		Salmirinne (penalty scored); Irvankoski E (penalty scored); Degerman (penalty scored); Ruotsalainen (penalty scored); Majander (penalty scored)

29 March 2026	KTU (6)	2-2 (4-5 p)	Heinäpään Hanhet (6)	Oulu
12:00	Kortti 17'; Leskelä 45'	Report	Raappana 3', 33'	Stadium: Heinäpää PH TN; Attendance: 50; Referee: Tuomas Hartikainen
	Penalties
	Leskelä (penalty missed); Pääkkölä (penalty scored); Jussila (penalty scored); Lauri (penalty scored); Saari (penalty missed); Koukkari (penalty scored); Sali (penalty missed)		Hannunen (penalty scored); Värjyvirta (penalty missed); Koivujärvi (penalty scored); Kokko (penalty scored); Raappana (penalty missed); Korhonen (penalty scored); Haapa-Aho (penalty scored)

== Round 3 ==
The draw for the third round was made on 1 April 2026 at 13:00 (Finnish Time) on the Finnish Football Association's (Palloliito) YouTube channel. 112 teams participate in this round. They are divided into four groups based on geography.

Number of teams per tier still in competition
Veikkausliiga (1)	Ykkösliiga (2)	Ykkönen (3)	Kakkonen (4)	Kolmonen (5)	Nelonen (6)	Vitonen (7)	Kutonen (8)	Seiska (9)	M35 (+35)	Total
12 / 12	9 / 9	10 / 10	25 / 25	42 / 91	10 / 88	6 / 100	1 / 65	0 / 12	1 / 3	116 / 415

=== Group 1 ===
9 April 2026	FC POHU/Hurjin (6)	0-8	Atlantis FC (4)	Lassila
21:15		Report	Boulakhras 47', 67'; Haruna 60', 61', 78', 84'; Salau 80'; Bekhedda 87'	Stadium: POHU Areena TN; Attendance: 20; Referee: Arsene Towa

10 April 2026	FC Futura (5)	4-1	GrIFK (4)	Porvoo
19:00	Keihäri 16'; Venäläinen 50', 65'; Kalliokoski 87'	Report	Kouyate 31'	Stadium: Pallokenttä TN; Attendance: 201; Referee: Aksoy Ibrahim

10 April 2026	VJS/Akatemia (5)	4-1	LoPa (5)	Myyrmäki
19:30	Johansson 45+1'; Fors 63'; Myllö 88'; Ojala 90+4'	Report	Sonko 22'	Stadium: Jalkapallostadion TN; Attendance: 50; Referee: Jesse Aalto

11 April 2026	Mando United (7)	0-16	HIFK (4)	Helsinki
11:00		Report	Hyppönen 2', 16', 30', 41', 57', 67'; Haapiainen 8', 31', 45'; Kunjanpää 20'; Lassoued 26', 63', 70'; Auranen 61'; Khayat 76'; Hukka 85'	Stadium: Tapuli TN; Attendance: 300; Referee: Lassi Matilainen

11 April 2026	SUMU/sob (6)	2-2 (1-3 p)	EPS (4)	Helsinki
16:00	Hassan 49'; Njuschin 68'	Report	Gebala 84'; Paappanen 88'	Stadium: Pallomylly TN; Attendance: 45; Referee: Antti Kolehmainen
	Penalties
	Abdi J (penalty missed); Njuschin (penalty missed); Korkka (penalty scored); Hiiesalu (penalty missed)		Asikainen (penalty scored); Rajamäki (penalty missed); Paappanen (penalty scored); Rönni (penalty scored)

11 April 2026	MPS (5)	0-7	EBK (4)	Helsinki
17:00		Report	Makkonen V 6'; Karaca 26'; (o.g.) 31', 35'; Wennervirta 41'; Sipi 61'; Fofana 90'	Stadium: Mosan Wembley TN; Attendance: 199; Referee: Osman Mohammadi

11 April 2026	HPS (4)	3-0	NJS (4)	Paloheinä
20:00	Ryhänen 4', 90+5'; Apajalahti 76'	Report		Stadium: Briotech Arena; Attendance: 202; Referee: Fahad Ali

12 April 2026	StaPa De Royale (6)	2-1	Loiske (5)	Helsinki
18:30	Soiniemi 26'; Sankkinen 79'	Report	Laakso 49'	Stadium: Pallomylly TN; Attendance: 10; Referee: Mikko Mörö

12 April 2026	IF Gnistan/M35 (+35)	2-2 (5-4 p)	TiPS/U21 (5)	Helsinki
21:00	Bäckman 51'; Sihvola 88'	Report	Ceni 31'; Tuomola 61'	Stadium: Markku.fi Areena; Attendance: 2000; Referee: Otto Helin
	Penalties
	Sihvola (penalty scored); Korhonen (penalty scored); Kärkkäinen (penalty scored); Kinnunen (penalty scored); Mäkiniemi (penalty scored)		Pyhämäki (penalty scored); Ceni (penalty scored); Mowlid (penalty scored); Suomela (penalty scored); Ketonen (penalty missed)

13 April 2026	Gilla FC (5)	2-5	PPJ (4)	Myyrmäki
20:15	Markkanen 11'; (o.g.) 35'	Report	Hagman 50'; Kauppila 59', 84'; Ouazine 71', 90'	Stadium: Jalkapallostadion TN; Attendance: 0 Referee: Valentin Smirnov

14 April 2026	TuPS (5)	0-2	JäPS (2)	Tuusula
18:00		Report	Ristola 85'; Maliki 90+3'	Stadium: Hyrylä UK TN; Attendance: 307; Referee: Jan-Peter Aravirta

14 April 2026	JäPS/47 (5)	0-7	VJS (3)	Järvenpää
18:30		Report	Nyholm 28', 48', 66'; Rahja 43'; Kangasmaa 76', 89'; Ahla 86'	Stadium: Keskusurheilukenttä TN; Attendance: 99; Referee: Valentin Smirnov

14 April 2026	FC POHU/CJ United (7)	3-0 w/o	IF Gnistan (1)	Lassila
19:00		Report		Stadium: POHU Areena TN; Attendance: 200; Referee: Emil Kohvakka

14 April 2026	FC Kiffen/3 (6)	0-5	IFK Mariehamn (1)	Helsinki
20:00		Report	Andersson 15', 58'; Lundberg 40'; (o.g.) 45'; Ngulube 75'	Stadium: Töölö PK 1 TN; Attendance: 107; Referee: Niko Jokinen

15 April 2026	PKKU (3)	2-3	KäPa (2)	Tuusula
18:00	Lokake 53'; Niemi 78'	Report	Pitkänen 43'; Lika 71', 90'	Stadium: Hyrylä UK TN; Attendance: 150; Referee: Abdirahman Sugulle

15 April 2026	FC Kiffen (4)	1-1 (6-7 p)	PuiU (4)	Helsinki
20:00	Partanen 75'	Report	Hussein 81'	Stadium: Töölö PK 1 TN; Attendance: 115; Referee: Niko Jokinen
	Penalties
	Lehtojuuri (penalty scored); Niska (penalty scored); Puumala (penalty scored); Nevalainen (penalty missed); Lappalainen (penalty missed); Osman (penalty scored); Loukiainen (penalty scored); Saarikko (penalty scored); Peetumber (penalty missed)		Karvinen (penalty missed); Mehmeti (penalty scored); Hussein (penalty scored); Assehnoun (penalty missed); Desalegen Atewebrhan (penalty scored); Hayes (penalty scored); Oris (penalty scored); Nuorala (penalty scored); Kahisalo (penalty scored)

15 April 2026	LePa (5)	1-4	FC Honka (4)	Espoo
20:15	Karlsson 59'	Report	Tukia 5', 35'; Heikkinen 21'; Umeh 25'	Stadium: Leppävaara 1 TN; Attendance: 0 Referee: Sami Kekäläinen

15 April 2026	HPS/2 (5)	1-5	PK-35 (2)	Paloheinä
20:15	Tast 39'	Report	Sadik 14', 29'; Pikkuhookana 41'; Lehtonen 47'; Tolonen 77'	Stadium: Briotech Arena; Attendance: 91; Referee: Otto Helin

16 April 2026	Toukolan Teräs (5)	0-1	Valtti (5)	Helsinki
18:00		Report	Niemi 54'	Stadium: Töölö PK 1 TN; Attendance: 0 Referee: Joni Taipale

18 April 2026	FC Germania (7)	2-4	Jokerit FC (6)	Jätkäsaari
17:15	Bisschop 70'; Bichik 82'	Report	Heinolainen T 13', 37'; Pelayo Sandoval 18'; Tukiainen 64'	Stadium: Jätkäsaari TN; Attendance: 83; Referee: Mikko Mörö

19 April 2026	PPJ/Lauttasaari (5)	3-3 (2-4 p)	Töölön Taisto (5)	Jätkäsaari
13:30	Heiermann 20'; Grönholm 40'; Sperryn 87'	Report	Laitinen 21'; Långbacka 25'; Varjovirta 74'	Stadium: Jätkäsaari TN; Attendance: 67; Referee: Waltteri Lummi
	Penalties
	Heiermann (penalty missed); Höckert (penalty scored); Kivistö (penalty missed); Hakulinen (penalty scored)		Åhman (penalty scored); Appelqvist (penalty scored); Klinga (penalty missed); Kuusela (penalty scored); Happonen (penalty scored)

=== Group 2 ===
8 April 2026	TPS 2 (7)	1-4	Masku (5)	Maku
20:15	Uusitalo 37'	Report	Moberg 7'; Hagelberg Al 38'; Kyläheiko 43'; Forss 66'	Stadium: Taponketo TN; Attendance: 80; Referee: Muamer Coloman

11 April 2026	Ylöjärvi United FC (5)	0-7	HJS (4)	Ylöjärvi
12:15		Report	Nokkonen 12'; Mäyränen 20', 29'; Niskanen 22'; Kajanto E 41'; Riihelä 67', 69'	Stadium: Soppeenharju TN; Attendance: 60; Referee: Aleksi Keronen

11 April 2026	VaKP (6)	0-6	ÅIFK (4)	Valkeakoski
14:00		Report	Berg 6'; Kåla 18'; Siirtola 63', 77'; (o.g.) 83'; Barbata 85'	Stadium: Sahara TN; Attendance: 150; Referee: Tuukka Virtanen

11 April 2026	VG-62 (5)	1-3	Närpes Kraft (4)	Naantali
15:00	Ojala 15'	Report	Ibric 26'; Isanovic 64', 84'	Stadium: Karvetti TN; Attendance: 62; Referee: Vili Lehtovaara

12 April 2026	ACE (5)	0-4	PIF (5)	Tampere
12:00		Report	Terrnava 6'; Nevä 17'; Bajrami 28'; Hyvärilä 88'	Stadium: Kauppi 1 TN; Attendance: 15; Referee: Jere Holappa

12 April 2026	Karhu-Futis (6)	1-6	FC LeKi (5)	Pori
18:30	Ranta 64'	Report	Vaittinen 19'; Nwabueze 36', 67'; Hiljanen 43'; Obeng-Sarpong 50'; Nsingi Malongui 83'	Stadium: UK-Tekonurmi; Attendance: 224; Referee: Aaro Ollila

14 April 2026	SalPa 2 (5)	0-11	VPS (1)	Salo
19:15		Report	Vahtera 1'; Smyth 13', 28', 32'; Keturi 25', 40', 66'; Ogunniyi 72'; Muzinga 81', 87'; van Duivenbooden 86'	Stadium: Urheilupuisto TN; Attendance: 100; Referee: Pouria Notash

14 April 2026	TPV/2 (5)	0-1	P-Iirot (4)	Tampere
19:30		Report	Ayannubi 34'	Stadium: Messukylä TN; Attendance: 50; Referee: Jere Holappa

14 April 2026	FC Kangasala (6)	1-1 (2-3 p)	EIF/Akademi (5)	Kangasala
19:30	Järvi 59'	Report	Estlander O 90+2'	Stadium: Suorama TN; Attendance: 148; Referee: Ville Kokkinen
	Penalties
	Venetjoki (penalty scored); Uski (penalty missed); Juurikivi (penalty missed); Saraste (penalty scored); Åkerlind (penalty missed)		Gottberg (penalty scored); Snabb (penalty missed); Estlander O (penalty scored); Heinämaa (penalty scored)

14 April 2026	Fish United (5)	0-4	SalPa (3)	Tampere
19:45		Report	Ranta 10'; Rautiainen 22'; Lulli 59'; Jakonen Ol 89'	Stadium: Pyynikin urheilukenttä TN; Attendance: 113; Referee: Aapo Kyllönen

15 April 2026	EIF (2)	1-2	TPS (1)	Tammisaari
18:30	Helander 45+2'	Report	Tsirigotis 11'; Karkulowski 89'	Stadium: Ekenäs Sparbank Arena TN; Attendance: 341; Referee: Matti Roth

15 April 2026	TPV (3)	0-2	Tampere United (3)	Tampere
19:15		Report	Väisänen 26'; Heikkinen 62'	Stadium: Kauppi 3 TN; Attendance: 739; Referee: Lassi Siukkola

17 April 2026	FC Lasten (5)	0-3	FC Haka (2)	Tampere
19:45		Report	Pietsalo 21'; Silas 65'; Mahlamäki 90+2'	Stadium: Pyynikin urheilukenttä TN; Attendance: 200; Referee: Aapo Kyllönen

=== Group 3 ===
7 April 2026	KyPa (7)	0-4	Union Plaani (4)	Karhula
19:30		Report	Mulari 31', 53'; (o.g.) 80'; Ahlfors 84'	Stadium: Keskuskenttä TN; Attendance: 20; Referee: Erik Pakkala

10 April 2026	JIPPO-j/PunaMusta (5)	0-2	JPS (5)	Joensuu
19:15		Report	Thusberg 45'; Rintatalo 68'	Stadium: Mehtimäki TN; Attendance: 60; Referee: Vladislav Dirgin

11 April 2026	NiemU (5)	0-1	PEPO (4)	Joensuu
14:00		Report	Enbuska Juu 83'	Stadium: Mehtimäki TN; Attendance: 91; Referee: Jere Hyötyläinen

11 April 2026	KoPa (5)	0-5	MyPa (4)	Lappeenranta
17:00		Report	Rauos 44'; Hernesniemi 51', 73'; Ahola 70'; Niemi 80'	Stadium: Sammonlahti 2 TN; Attendance: 0 Referee: Remi Rantakaulio

13 April 2026	FC Vaajakoski (4)	0-1	JJK Jyväskylä (3)	Jyväskylä
18:30		Report	Imonioro 45+1'	Stadium: Viitaniemi TN; Attendance: 749; Referee: Juho Nieminen

13 April 2026	KTP (2)	1-3	FC Lahti (1)	Kotka
18:30	Sunday 90'	Report	Andersson 4'; Lindholm 17'; Ojanen 20'	Stadium: Arto Tolsa Areena; Attendance: 886; Referee: Amir Hajizadeh

14 April 2026	HaPK Edustus (5)	1-6	SJK (1)	Hamina
18:00	Atemengue Awono 45'	Report	Padera 19'; Streng 22', 40'; Paananen 25', 27'; Rangel 70'	Stadium: Urheilukenttä N Attendance: 500; Referee: Paul Kirsch

14 April 2026	JIPPO (2)	1-2	MP (2)	Joensuu
18:00	Smith 17'	Report	Ylönen 42', 59'	Stadium: Mehtimäki TN; Attendance: 423; Referee: Henrik Sandmark

14 April 2026	Reipas (4)	1-1 (3-5 p)	KuPS Akatemia I (3)	Lahti
18:30	Özel 6'	Report	Hautakangas 11'	Stadium: Kisapuisto Stadion TN; Attendance: 229; Referee: Fahad Ali
	Penalties
	Özel (penalty scored); Kuparinen (penalty scored); Köse (penalty scored); Väisänen (penalty missed)		Tahkola A (penalty scored); Tahkola R (penalty scored); Mattila (penalty scored); Huttunen (penalty scored); Kivijärvi (penalty scored)

16 April 2026	Kuopion Elo (6)	0-10	Huima/Urho (4)	Kuopio
19:30		Report	Rantamäki 23', 33'; Rutanen 29', 87'; Fadera 37', 83'; Verkko 39'; Lampila 46', 85'; Sippola 73'	Stadium: Väre Areena TN; Attendance: 123; Referee: Joni Kortelainen

19 April 2026	PoPo (8)	2-1	PK-37 (5)	Karhula
17:00	Nykänen 11'; Rikberg 33'	Report	(o.g.) 24'	Stadium: Keskuskenttä TN; Attendance: 211; Referee: Turo Veini

=== Group 4 ===
11 April 2026	HauPa (5)	2-3	GBK (4)	Haukipudas
15:00	Mahdi 79'; Ervasti 84'	Report	Maldonado 27', 65'; Moraes 41'	Stadium: Länsituuli TN; Attendance: 99; Referee: Satu Miettunen

11 April 2026	LappBK (7)	1-8	Virkiä (5)	Kristinestad
15:00	Ziazikov 60'	Report	Niemelá Juh 12', 20', 38', 85'; Koski 29'; Kara 34'; Kuusisto 44'; Takala J 49'	Stadium: Braheplan TN; Attendance: 187; Referee: Miro Leppäkoski

12 April 2026	Heinäpään Hanhet (6)	0-10	Hercules (4)	Oulu
14:00		Report	Jibrin 5'; Kärsämä 25', 36', 38'; Huitsi 41', 71'; Henttunen 60', 81'; Lehtosaari 79'; Aliyu 89'	Stadium: Castren TN; Attendance: 70; Referee: Joel Merikanto

14 April 2026	FC Kiisto (5)	1-2	RoPS (3)	Vaasa
19:00	Maki 3'	Report	Mekki 68'; Sukuvaara 87'	Stadium: Lemonsoft Stadion; Attendance: 101; Referee: Oskari Kaarniranta

14 April 2026	VPV (5)	0-3	SJK Akatemia (2)	Vaasa
19:00		Report	Garang 51'; Raiski 57'; Mbumba 86'	Stadium: Variska TN; Attendance: 0 Referee: Joona Haapa-aho

15 April 2026	AC Oulu (1)	1-2	FF Jaro (1)	Oulu
18:00	Mäkeläinen 52'	Report	Weckström 24', 45'	Stadium: Castren TN; Attendance: 482; Referee: Joona Kontinen

15 April 2026	VIFK (5)	4-4 (5-6 p)	KPV (3)	Vaasa
18:30	Doudi 58', 67', 79'; Birhane H 75'	Report	Santalo N 36'; Mikkola 38'; Wegye 59'; Arope 90'	Stadium: Kamratvallen TN; Attendance: 115; Referee: Mikko Juusola
	Penalties
	Nuutinen (penalty scored); Birhane H (penalty scored); Westermark (penalty missed); Puhakalainen (penalty scored); Doudi (penalty scored); Båge (penalty scored); Österåker (penalty missed)		Wegye (penalty scored); Välipakka (penalty scored); Arope (penalty scored); Moilanen (penalty missed); Mäenpää (penalty scored); Hirvinen (penalty scored); Vesala (penalty scored)

15 April 2026	KajHa (5)	0-4	VPS Akatemia (4)	Kajaani
19:00		Report	(o.g.) 41'; Karlsson 57'; Autio 77'; Tuovinen 83'	Stadium: Liikuntapuisto TN; Attendance: 426; Referee: Kasper Halonen

15 April 2026	FC Santa Claus (5)	1-9	OLS (3)	Rovaniemi
20:00	Frst S 41'	Report	Kone 5', 28'; Ylläsjärvi 20', 71'; Ridanpää 29', 54'; Korkala A 47'; Laru 65'; Taumberger 88'	Stadium: Keskuskenttä TN; Attendance: 250; Referee: Joakim Väärälä

16 April 2026	FC Ylivieska (5)	1-1 (4-3 p)	JBK (4)	Ylivieska
18:00	Bulatkulov 82'	Report	Björkskog R 43'	Stadium: Safari TN; Attendance: 470; Referee: Tomi Gronoff
	Penalties
	Bulatkulov (penalty scored); Ojala J (penalty scored); Huuha (penalty missed); Ojala K (penalty scored); Vähäaho (penalty scored)		Björkskog R (penalty missed); Strang (penalty scored); Järvenlahti (penalty scored); Östman (penalty scored); Öst (penalty missed)

18 April 2026	RoPo (5)	2-2 (5-4 p)	KaPa (5)	Rovaniemi
18:30	Majander 70'; Luiro 83'	Report	Clinton 17'; Evo 87'	Stadium: Keskuskenttä TN; Attendance: 300; Referee: Joel Chydenius
	Penalties
	Salmirinne (penalty scored); Irvankoski (penalty scored); Degerman (penalty scored); Ruotsalainen (penalty scored); Majander (penalty scored)		Evo (penalty scored); Samnda (penalty scored); Kähkönen (penalty missed); Abakar (penalty scored); Bruneel (penalty scored)

== Round 4 ==
The draw for the fourth round was made on 21 April 2026 at 11:00 (Finnish Time) on the Finnish Football Association's (Palloliito) YouTube channel. 56 teams participate in this round. They are divided into four groups based on geography.

Number of teams per tier still in competition
Veikkausliiga (1)	Ykkösliiga (2)	Ykkönen (3)	Kakkonen (4)	Kolmonen (5)	Nelonen (6)	Vitonen (7)	Kutonen (8)	Seiska (9)	M35 (+35)	Total
10 / 12	6 / 9	8 / 10	19 / 25	12 / 91	2 / 88	1 / 100	1 / 65	0 / 12	1 / 3	60 / 415

=== Group 1 ===
27 April 2026	StaPa De Royale (6)	1-8	PK-35 (2)	Helsinki
18:20	Leppälä 62'	Report	Tolonen 19'; Cascalhais Diniz 36'; Goshnaw 40'; Sibito 43'; Ndaziramiye 45'; Räsänen 58'; Sadik 78', 90'	Stadium: Töölö PK 1 TN; Attendance: 120; Referee: Mikka Salminen

28 April 2026	Töölön Taisto (5)	1-9	JäPS (2)	Helsinki
18:00	Viisainen 6'	Report	Söderlund 8', 71'; Valto 11', 56'; Dahlfors 23', 37'; Maliki 46'; Taskos 67'; Ölander 87'	Stadium: Kallio TN; Attendance: 112; Referee: Jan-Peter Aravirta

28 April 2026	HPS (4)	1-2	IFK Mariehamn (1)	Helsinki
18:30	Sheikhani 15'	Report	Huttunen 57'; Larsson 68'	Stadium: Briotech Arena; Attendance: 348; Referee: Abdirahman Sugulle

28 April 2026	VJS/Akatemia (5)	1-3	KäPa (2)	Vantaa
20:00	Ketonen 76'	Report	Pastinen 43'; Pitkänen 53', 73'	Stadium: Jalkapallostadion TN; Attendance: 120; Referee: Unto Tuominen

28 April 2026	Atlantis FC (4)	3-3 (2-4 p)	FC Honka (4)	Helsinki
20:00	Haruna 9', 61', 76'	Report	Liikonen 12'; Hämälainen 54'; Woivalin 68'	Stadium: Kallio TN; Attendance: 103; Referee: Osman Mohammadi
	Penalties
	Nyemb (penalty missed); Hoxhaj (penalty missed); Shevchenko (penalty scored); Boulakhras (penalty scored)		Jännes (penalty scored); Woivalin (penalty scored); Äijälä (penalty scored); Tukia (penalty scored)

28 April 2026	Jokerit FC (6)	0-5	HIFK (4)	Helsinki
21:00		Report	Erikson 34'; (o.g.) 41'; Lassoued 57'; Haapiainen 67', 88'; Ndaziramiye 45'; Räsänen 58'; Sadik 78', 90'	Stadium: Markku.fi Areena; Attendance: 2458; Referee: Sami Kekäläinen

29 April 2026	FC Futura (5)	2-2 (2-4 p)	VJS (3)	Porvoo
18:30	Stenstrand 56'; Keihäri 80'	Report	Nyholm 16'; Kangasmaa 19'	Stadium: Pallokenttä TN; Attendance: 303; Referee: Waltteri Lummi
	Penalties
	Stenstrand (penalty missed); Kouva (penalty missed); Keihäri (penalty scored); Venäläinen (penalty scored)		Marin (penalty scored); Babiker (penalty scored); Rahja (penalty scored); Koivunen (penalty scored)

29 April 2026	PPJ (4)	0-1	HJS (4)	Helsinki
19:00		Report	Kajanto E 79'	Stadium: Jätkäsaari TN; Attendance: 211; Referee: Antti Kolehmainen

29 April 2026	IF Gnistan/M35 (+35)	1-1 (2-4 p)	PuiU (4)	Helsinki
21:00	Kinnunen 90+6'	Report	Mohamed 21'	Stadium: Markku.fi Areena; Attendance: 250; Referee: Emil Kohvakka
	Penalties
	Sihvola (penalty missed); Korhonen (penalty scored); Kärkkäinen (penalty missed); Kinnunen (penalty scored)		Oris (penalty scored); Mehmeti (penalty scored); Hussein (penalty scored); Lindström (penalty scored)

29 April 2026	Valtti (5)	0-2	EPS (4)	Helsinki
21:05		Report	Harjanne 17'; Reiju 85'	Stadium: Hartwall Sport Areena TN; Attendance: 62; Referee: Kaur Jasmine

5 May 2026	FC POHU/CJ United (7)	4-4 (4-5 p)	EBK (4)	Helsinki
18:00	Pirttiniemi 11'; Souris 35', 70'; Rakhola R 76'	Report	Karaca 1'; (o.g.) 79'; Rashica 90+1'; Fofana 90+4'	Stadium: POHU Areena TN; Attendance: 100; Referee: Fereidoun Mohammadi
	Penalties
	Kaateri (penalty scored); Blomqvist (penalty scored); Khan (penalty scored); Lahti (penalty scored); Puumala (penalty missed)		Hietanen (penalty scored); Karaca (penalty scored); Rashica (penalty scored); Halimi (penalty scored); Pllana (penalty scored)

=== Group 2 ===
28 April 2026	SalPa (3)	1-1 (6-7 p)	TPS (1)	Salo
18:00	Rrustemi Er 67'	Report	Sihvonen 47'	Stadium: Urheilupuisto TN; Attendance: 365; Referee: Joona Kontinen
	Penalties
	Voca (penalty scored); Lulli (penalty scored); Meura (penalty scored); Seidu (penalty scored); Miyazaki (penalty missed); Kostian Ja (penalty scored); Kadowaki (penalty scored); Ndakala (penalty missed)		Muzaci (penalty scored); Tsirigotis (penalty missed); Ikonen (penalty scored); Könkkölä (penalty scored); Anini (penalty scored); Kauppila (penalty scored); Häggström (penalty scored); Turkki (penalty scored)

29 April 2026	PIF (5)	0-2	P-Iirot (4)	Pargas
18:15		Report	Rouna 37'; Kokir 90+3'	Stadium: Aktia LKV Arena TN; Attendance: 167; Referee: Einari Sario

29 April 2026	EIF/Akademi (5)	0-7	FC Haka (2)	Tammisaari
19:00		Report	Mahlamäki 6'; Lehtinen 26'; Nurmi 36'; Whyte 55', 61', 76'; Rautio 84'	Stadium: Ekenäs Sparbank Arena TN; Attendance: 325; Referee: Sakari Ojanen

29 April 2026	Närpes Kraft (4)	0-6	Tampere United (3)	Närpes
19:15		Report	Bradbury 14', 34'; Väisänen 35'; Georg 58'; Torniainen 63'; Lehtonen 78'	Stadium: Sparbanken Arena TN; Attendance: 181; Referee: Joona Haapa-aho

29 April 2026	FC LeKi (5)	1-9	VPS (1)	Akaa
19:30	Morray 15'	Report	Keturi 20', 22', 49'; Vahtera 24'; Abdihakim Ali 35'; Lindholm 63'; Ogunniyi 65'; Smyth 82', 88'	Stadium: Pallokenttä TN; Attendance: 100; Referee: Kalle Mäkinen

29 April 2026	Masku (5)	0-1	ÅIFK (4)	Masku
19:45		Report	Barbata 90+3'	Stadium: Taponketo TN; Attendance: 0 Referee: Muamer Coloman

=== Group 3 ===
28 April 2026	Huima/Urho (4)	0-4	KuPS Akatemia I (3)	Äänekoski
18:30		Report	Tahkola R 17'; Kivijärvi 27', 38'; Leivonen 71'	Stadium: Keskuskenttä TN; Attendance: 112; Referee: Lassi Siukkola

28 April 2026	PEPO (4)	2-1	JJK Jyväskylä (3)	Lappeenranta
18:30	Suoraniemi 27'; Enbuska Juu 81'	Report	Liimatainen 54'	Stadium: Amis TN; Attendance: 285; Referee: Remi Rantakaulio

28 April 2026	Union Plaani (4)	2-4	FC Lahti (1)	Heinola
18:30	Harjula 6'; Hassan 58'	Report	Koskinen 19'; Muller 51'; Sarr 83'; Benavenuto Barbosa 90+3'	Stadium: Urheilupuisto N Attendance: 662; Referee: Matti Roth

28 April 2026	JPS (5)	3-5	MP (2)	Jyväskylä
19:00	Madetoja 45', 88'; Rintalo 59'	Report	Stenius 45+2'; Kastrati 53'; Alsheikh 90+1', 90+8'; Ylönen 90+10'	Stadium: Viitaniemi TN; Attendance: 300; Referee: Vilho Jokinen

29 April 2026	PoPo (8)	1-4	MyPa (4)	Karhula
18:00	Nykänen 43'	Report	Kähkönen 9'; Haimi 26'; Saarelainen 37'; Heimonen 63'	Stadium: Keskuskenttä TN; Attendance: 313; Referee: Kari Vantola

=== Group 4 ===
28 April 2026	VPS Akatemia (4)	1-6	SJK (1)	Vaasa
18:00	Autio 29'	Report	Yakubu 12', 15', 83'; (o.g.) 39'; Wilson 39'; Rangel 53'	Stadium: Lemonsoft Stadion; Attendance: 218; Referee: Henrik Sandmark

28 April 2026	OLS (3)	1-2	SJK Akatemia (2)	Oulu
18:00	Ridanpaä 45+1'	Report	Töllinen 73'; Nikkilä 90+3'	Stadium: Castren TN; Attendance: 101; Referee: Joakim Väärälä

28 April 2026	GBK (4)	0-2	FF Jaro (1)	Kokkola
18:30		Report	Vikström 15', 83'	Stadium: Keskuskenttä TN; Attendance: 755; Referee: Tatu Korkalainen

29 April 2026	RoPo (5)	0-4	KPV (3)	Rovaniemi
17:30		Report	Moilanen J 13'; Arope 16', 73'; Åberg 66'	Stadium: Keskuskenttä TN; Attendance: 190; Referee: Satu Miettunen

29 April 2026	FC Ylivieska (5)	0-1	RoPS (3)	Ylivieska
18:00		Report	Kontiokoski 18'	Stadium: Safari TN; Attendance: 570; Referee: Tomi Gronoff

29 April 2026	Virkiä (5)	1-4	Hercules (4)	Lapua
18:00	Takala J 33'	Report	Lehtosaari 3'; Salmela 53'; Kärsämä 58'; Keskitalo 84'	Stadium: Liuhtari TN; Attendance: 150; Referee: Simon Sjöstrand

== Round 5 ==
The draw for the fifth round was made on 5 May 2026 at 11:00 (Finnish Time) on the Finnish Football Association's (Palloliito) YouTube channel. 32 teams participate in this round.

Number of teams per tier still in competition
Veikkausliiga (1)	Ykkösliiga (2)	Ykkönen (3)	Kakkonen (4)	Kolmonen (5)	Nelonen (6)	Vitonen (7)	Kutonen (8)	Seiska (9)	M35 (+35)	Total
10 / 12	6 / 9	5 / 10	11 / 25	0 / 91	0 / 88	0 / 100	0 / 65	0 / 12	0 / 3	32 / 415

12 May 2026	FC Inter (1)	8-0	Hercules (4)	Turku
17:00	Botué 9'; Tauriainen 10', 32', 77'; Huovila 54'; Ulundu 57'; Kangasniemi 63'; Jephta 83'	Report		Stadium: Veritas Stadion; Attendance: 266; Referee: Pouria Notash

12 May 2026	SJK (1)	3-0	PEPO (4)	Seinäjoki
18:00	Djaló 11', 37'; Paananen 73'	Report		Stadium: OmaSP Stadion; Attendance: 1795; Referee: Joona Haapa-aho

12 May 2026	PK-35 (2)	0-2	KuPS (1)	Helsinki
19:00		Report	Engvall 61'; Kabuye 67'	Stadium: Markku.fi Areena; Attendance: 756; Referee: Matti Roth

13 May 2026	VPS (1)	7-0	ÅIFK (4)	Vaasa
18:00	Kuek 2'; Ogunniyi 9', 22'; Vahtera 12'; Keturi 31'; Abdihakim Ali 32'; Daoussi 86'	Report		Stadium: Lemonsoft Stadion; Attendance: 288; Referee: Petri Viljanen

13 May 2026	P-Iirot (4)	0-4	Ilves (1)	Rauma
18:00		Report	Hytönen 16'; Multala 58'; Kanga 71'; Wallius 73'	Stadium: Äijänsuo stadion TN; Attendance: 921; Referee: Vili Lehtovara

13 May 2026	EPS (4)	0-4	FC Haka (2)	Espoo
18:00		Report	Laaksonen 12'; Whyte 65'; Ali-Abubakar 66'; Karlsson 77'	Stadium: Espoonlahti 2 TN; Attendance: 567; Referee: Juuso Vuorinen

13 May 2026	TPS (1)	3-0	HJS (4)	Turku
18:00	Könkkölä 28'; Anini 51', 78'	Report		Stadium: Veritas Stadion; Attendance: 415; Referee: Joni Hyytiä

13 May 2026	KäPa (2)	1-1 (4-5 p)	MyPa (4)	Helsinki
18:00	Sillah 78'	Report	Kaiga 44'	Stadium: KäPa Campus 1 TN; Attendance: 98; Referee: Valentin Smirnov
	Penalties
	Almen (penalty missed); Pastinen (penalty scored); Ripatti (penalty scored); Sillah (penalty scored); Lika (penalty scored)		Hernesniemi (penalty scored); Kuismala (penalty scored); Saarelainen (penalty scored); Kaiga (penalty scored); Piira (penalty scored)

13 May 2026	HIFK (4)	1-3	JäPS (2)	Helsinki
18:00	Kurvinen 19'	Report	Heidari 27'; Söderlund 73'; Taskos 87'	Stadium: Töölö PK 1 TN; Attendance: 395; Referee: Amir Hajizadeh

13 May 2026	SJK Akatemia (2)	2-0	KPV (3)	Seinäjoki
18:00	Asare 59'; Okoth 83'	Report		Stadium: OmaSP Stadion; Attendance: 405; Referee: Lotta Vuorio

13 May 2026	FC Lahti (1)	3-1	MP (2)	Lahti
18:00	Heikkinen 10'; Belabid 49'; Benavenuto Barbosa 72'	Report	Atakayi 27'	Stadium: Lahden Stadion; Attendance: 576; Referee: Antti Munukka

13 May 2026	VJS (3)	5-3	FF Jaro (1)	Vantaa
18:30	Rahja 31', 75'; Koivunen 42'; Babiker 67'; Saksinen 90+4'	Report	Vikström 78'; Skau 84'; Mendy 90+1'	Stadium: Jalkapallostadion TN; Attendance: 777; Referee: Miika Pesonen

13 May 2026	RoPS (3)	0-4	HJK (1)	Rovaniemi
18:30		Report	Leveälahti 15'; Lappalainen 28'; Ameen 87'; Cicale 88'	Stadium: Keskuskenttä TN; Attendance: 1725; Referee: Tatu Korkalainen

13 May 2026	IFK Mariehamn (1)	3-0	PuiU (4)	Mariehamn
18:30	Soiniemi 8'; Fyrqvist 50'; Melander 83'	Report		Stadium: Wiklöf Holding Arena; Attendance: 279; Referee: Joel Vanhanen

13 May 2026	EBK (4)	2-2 (4-3 p)	Tampere United (3)	Espoo
19:00	Koskela 16'; Vettenranta 32'	Report	Väisänen 36'; Bradbury 71'	Stadium: Keski-Espoo 1 TN; Attendance: 172; Referee: Osman Mohammadi
	Penalties
	Hietanen (penalty scored); Karaca (penalty scored); Rashica (penalty missed); Halimi (penalty scored); Pllana (penalty scored)		Rantala (penalty scored); Bradbury (penalty scored); Kyllönen (penalty scored); Hasa (penalty missed); Laitinen (penalty missed)

13 May 2026	KuPS Akatemia I (3)	0-1	FC Honka (4)	Kuopio
19:30		Report	Katajamäki 70'	Stadium: Väre Areena; Attendance: 200; Referee: Miikka Haapakoski

== Round 6 ==
The draw for the sixth round was made on 5 May 2026 at 11:00 (Finnish Time) on the Finnish Football Association's (Palloliito) YouTube channel. 16 teams participate in this round.

Number of teams per tier still in competition
Veikkausliiga (1)	Ykkösliiga (2)	Ykkönen (3)	Kakkonen (4)	Kolmonen (5)	Nelonen (6)	Vitonen (7)	Kutonen (8)	Seiska (9)	M35 (+35)	Total
9 / 12	3 / 9	1 / 10	3 / 25	0 / 91	0 / 88	0 / 100	0 / 65	0 / 12	0 / 3	16 / 415

26 May 2026	IFK Mariehamn (1)	0-1	FC Lahti (1)	Mariehamn
18:00		Report	Heikkinen 52'	Stadium: Wiklöf Holding Arena; Attendance: 350; Referee: Amir Hajizadeh

26 May 2026	SJK Akatemia (2)	0-5	SJK (1)	Seinäjoki
18:00		Report	Onuoha 9', 53'; Chukwudi 13'; Kekarainen 43'; Paananen 80'	Stadium: OmaSP Stadion; Attendance: 550; Referee: Akseli Ropponen

26 May 2026	VPS (1)	4-0	FC Haka (2)	Vaasa
18:00	Muzinga 20'; Daoussi 80'; Kuek 85'; Lindholm 87'	Report		Stadium: Kamratvallen TN; Attendance: 300; Referee: Miikka Haapakoski

26 May 2026	FC Inter (1)	2-1	EBK (4)	Turku
18:30	Laine J 22'; Tuominen 82'	Report	Vettenranta 36'	Stadium: Veritas Stadion; Attendance: 350; Referee: Joona Kontinen

26 May 2026	JäPS (2)	0-1	KuPS (1)	Järvenpää
18:30		Report	Ruoppi 72'	Stadium: Keskusurheilukenttä TN; Attendance: 1451; Referee: Juuso Vuorinen

26 May 2026	FC Honka (4)	5-1	VJS (3)	Espoo
19:00	Pyyskänen 39'; Umeh 41', 90+4'; Ramström 53'; Ahokas 56'	Report	Salo 78'	Stadium: Leppävaara Stadion N Attendance: 377; Referee: Abdirahman Sugulle

26 May 2026	HJK (1)	11-1	MyPa (4)	Helsinki
19:00	Mero 9', 85'; (o.g.) 16'; Kirilov 20', 23'; Borchers 26', 32'; Ezeh 67', 78'; Möller 72', 84'	Report	Haimi 69'	Stadium: Bolt Arena; Attendance: 2568; Referee: Lotta Vuorio

27 May 2026	Ilves (1)	1-0	TPS (1)	Tampere
18:30	Kilo 45'	Report		Stadium: Tammelan Stadion; Attendance: 1018; Referee: Antti Munukka

== Quarter-finals ==
The draw for the quarter-finals was made on 2 June 2026 on the Finnish Football Association's (Palloliito) YouTube channel. 8 teams participate in this round.

Number of teams per tier still in competition
Veikkausliiga (1)	Ykkösliiga (2)	Ykkönen (3)	Kakkonen (4)	Kolmonen (5)	Nelonen (6)	Vitonen (7)	Kutonen (8)	Seiska (9)	M35 (+35)	Total
7 / 12	0 / 9	0 / 10	1 / 25	0 / 91	0 / 88	0 / 100	0 / 65	0 / 12	0 / 3	8 / 415

9 June 2026	FC Honka (4)	1-7	HJK (1)	Espoo
18:30	Umeh 5'	Report	Ring 8'; Mero 17', 32'; Pukki 22'; Montano 61'; Hudd 81'; Kirilov 89'	Stadium: Leppävaara Stadion N Attendance: 2400; Referee: Amir Hajizadeh

10 June 2026	KuPS (1)	0-0 (4-5 p)	VPS (1)	Kuopio
17:00		Report		Stadium: Väre Areena; Attendance: 1214; Referee: Antti Munukka
	Penalties
	Moreno Ciorciari (penalty scored); Heiskanen (penalty scored); Antwi (penalty scored); Pennanen (penalty missed); Heinonen (penalty scored); Gasc (penalty missed)		Haukioja (penalty scored); Lindholm (penalty scored); Smyth (penalty scored); Daoussi (penalty scored); Okereke (penalty missed); Kouassivi-Benissan (penalty scored)

10 June 2026	SJK (1)	1-2	FC Inter (1)	Seinäjoki
18:00	Mastokangas 21'	Report	Botué 13'; Laine J 47'	Stadium: Keskuskenttä N Attendance: 1600; Referee: Joona Kontinen

10 June 2026	Ilves (1)	5-2	FC Lahti (1)	Tampere
18:00	Stjopin 3', 4', 34'; Wallius 8'; Kanga 52'	Report	Andersson 15', 24'	Stadium: Tammelan Stadion; Attendance: 1314; Referee: Matti Roth

== Semi-finals ==
The draw for the semi-finals was made on 2 June 2026 on the Finnish Football Association's (Palloliito) YouTube channel. 4 teams participate in this round.

Number of teams per tier still in competition
Veikkausliiga (1)	Ykkösliiga (2)	Ykkönen (3)	Kakkonen (4)	Kolmonen (5)	Nelonen (6)	Vitonen (7)	Kutonen (8)	Seiska (9)	M35 (+35)	Total
4 / 12	0 / 9	0 / 10	0 / 25	0 / 91	0 / 88	0 / 100	0 / 65	0 / 12	0 / 3	4 / 415

30 June 2026	VPS (1)	2-3	FC Inter (1)	Vaasa
18:00	Haukioja 45', 90+4'	Report	Tuominen 48'; Salomaa 63'; Conteh 75'	Stadium: Lemonsoft Stadion; Attendance: 2354; Referee: Oliver Reitala

1 July 2026	HJK (1)	2-1	Ilves (1)	Helsinki
19:00	Möller 3'; Cicale 79'	Report	Hytönen 73'	Stadium: Bolt Arena; Attendance: 3112; Referee: Peiman Simani

== Final ==
The final was held between the two semi-final winners.

Number of teams per tier still in competition
Veikkausliiga (1)	Ykkösliiga (2)	Ykkönen (3)	Kakkonen (4)	Kolmonen (5)	Nelonen (6)	Vitonen (7)	Kutonen (8)	Seiska (9)	M35 (+35)	Total
2 / 12	0 / 9	0 / 10	0 / 25	0 / 91	0 / 88	0 / 100	0 / 65	0 / 12	0 / 3	2 / 415

5 September 2026	FC Inter (1)	1-0	HJK (1)	Tampere
18:10	Conteh 45+11'	Report		Stadium: Tammelan Stadion; Attendance: 4791; Referee: Mohammad Al-Emara
