= Simon Lindholm =

Finnish footballer (born 2001)

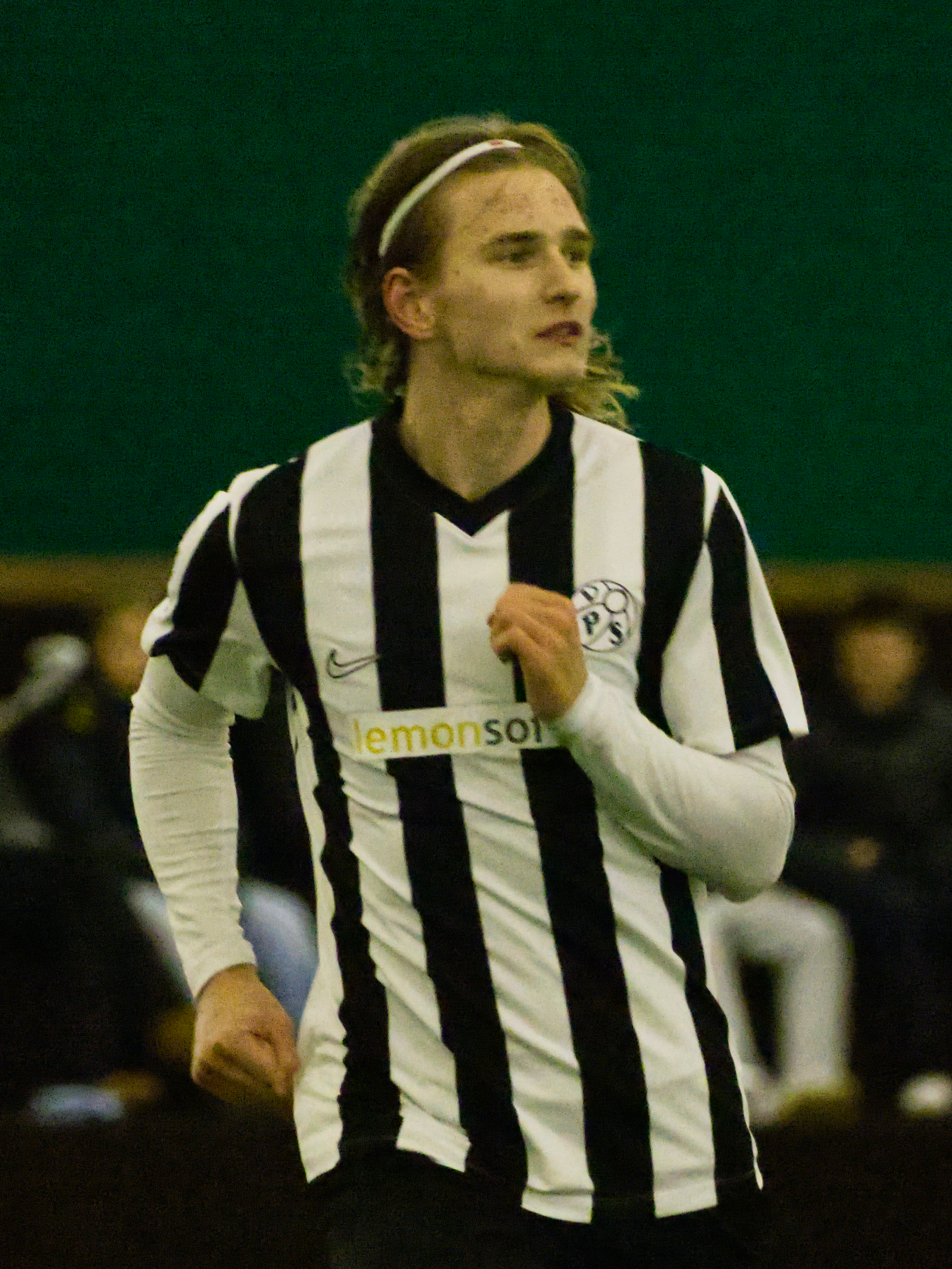
- Lindholm in 2025

Personal information
- Full name: Simon Lindholm
- Date of birth: 1 December 2001 (age 24)
- Place of birth: Inkoo, Finland
- Height: 1.93 m (6 ft 4 in)
- Position: Central midfielder

Team information
- Current team: VPS
- Number: 14

Youth career
- EIF
- –2015: BK-46
- 2015–2017: EIF

Senior career*
Years	Team	Apps	(Gls)
2017–2021	EIF Akademi	66	(11)
2017–2024	EIF	115	(4)
2025	Haka	25	(4)
2026–	VPS	29	(7)
- * Club domestic league appearances and goals as of 13 November 2026

Simon Lindholm (born 1 December 2001) is a Finnish professional footballer who plays as a midfielder for the Veikkausliiga club VPS.

== Early life ==
Lindholm was born in Inkoo, but moved to a nearby town Ekenäs when aged six. Subsequently, he joined a youth team of a local football club Ekenäs IF. He featured also in the youth teams of another local Karjaa-based club BK-46, but he grew up as an EIF supporter. In his youth, his main sport was track and field and running for many years, until he signed his first professional contract with EIF and chose football.

== Club career ==
On 22 April 2017, Lindholm made his first senior appearance with the club's reserve team EIF Akademi in the fourth tier Kolmonen, in the season opening match against Malmin Ponnistajat. Six months later, aged 16, he debuted with EIF's first team in the Finnish second tier, in away match against AC Oulu. He started to play regularly with the first team in the 2019 Ykkönen season, when the team was coached by Gabriel Garcia Xatart. During the next few years, he featured for both the first team and the reserve team, and suffered also a knee injury. In the 2023 season, Lindholm contributed in 23 league appearances and a scored one goal, helping EIF to win the Ykkönen title and promotion to Veikkausliiga. The promotion was the second time in the club's entire history, after 90 years of playing in the lower tiers.

On 6 April 2024, Lindholm debuted in Veikkausliiga with his hometown club, in the opening game of the 2024 season against IFK Mariehamn. He scored his first goal in the league on 26 May, in a 4–1 away defeat against Kuopion Palloseura.

After EIF was relegated, Lindholm joined fellow Veikkausliiga club Haka on 31 October 2024, on a one-year deal with a one-year option. Prior to his departure from EIF, Lindholm had represented the club for over 15 years. On 5 April, Lindholm scored his first goal for Haka in the season opening match, helping his side to win IF Gnistan 3–2 home at Tehtaan kenttä stadium.

== Personal life ==
Lindholm grew up as an EIF supporter and has attended the matches frequently since he was a child, when the first team was playing in Kolmonen and Kakkonen.

Lindholm fulfilled his mandatory conscription service in 2020.

== Career statistics ==
As of 16 May 2025

Appearances and goals by club, season and competition
Club	Season	League			Cup (Note: Includes Suomen Cup)		League cup (Note: Includes Ykköscup and Finnish League Cup)		Total	
Club	Season	Division	Apps	Goals	Apps	Goals	Apps	Goals	Apps	Goals
EIF Akademi	2017	Kolmonen	19	3	–		–		19	3
EIF Akademi	2018	Kolmonen	21	4	–		–		21	4
EIF Akademi	2019	Kolmonen	7	0	–		–		7	0
EIF Akademi	2020	Kolmonen	7	1	–		–		7	1
EIF Akademi	2021	Kolmonen	12	3	–		–		12	3
EIF Akademi	Total		66	11	0	0	0	0	66	11
EIF II	2021	Nelonen	1	1	–		–		1	1
Ekenäs IF	2017	Ykkönen	1	0	–		–		1	0
Ekenäs IF	2018	Ykkönen	1	0	2	0	–		3	0
Ekenäs IF	2019	Ykkönen	19	0	3	0	–		22	0
Ekenäs IF	2020	Ykkönen	7	0	5	1	–		12	1
Ekenäs IF	2021	Ykkönen	10	0	2	0	–		12	0
Ekenäs IF	2022	Ykkönen	27	1	3	1	5	1	35	3
Ekenäs IF	2023	Ykkönen	23	1	4	0	4	0	31	1
Ekenäs IF	2024	Veikkausliiga	27	2	3	0	5	2	35	4
Ekenäs IF	Total		115	4	22	2	14	3	151	9
Haka	2025	Veikkausliiga	7	2	1	0	5	0	13	2
Career total			189	18	23	2	19	3	231	23

== Honours ==
EIF

- Ykkönen: 2023
