= Baba Haruna =

Ghanaian footballer (born 2002)

Personal information
- Full name: Baba Haruna
- Date of birth: 8 October 2002 (age 24)
- Place of birth: Ghana
- Position: Centre-forward

Team information
- Current team: Honka
- Number: 46

Youth career
- Real Scandy FC

Senior career*
Years	Team	Apps	(Gls)
2022–2023	Honka II	38	(23)
2023	Honka	1	(0)
2024	SalPa	6	(0)
2024	→ Tampere United (loan)	11	(8)
2025	Jazz	18	(7)
2026	Atlantis	16	(18)
2026–	Honka	7	(2)
- * Club domestic league appearances and goals as of 8 November 2026

Baba Haruna (born 8 October 2002) is a Ghanaian professional footballer who plays as a centre-forward for Finnish club Honka.

== Club career ==
After a trial with IK Start, Haruna signed with FC Honka organisation in Finland, starting in 2022 season. He made his Veikkausliiga debut with Honka first team in 2023, but played mainly for the reserve team Honka II in third-tier Kakkonen.

On 10 December 2023, Haruna signed with second-tier Ykkösliiga club Salon Palloilijat (SalPa) on a one-year deal with an option for one more.

On 8 July 2024, Haruna was loaned out to Tampere United in Kakkonen for the rest of the season.

He signed for FC Jazz in third-tier Ykkönen for the 2025 season.

== Career statistics ==
As of 18 May 2025

Appearances and goals by club, season and competition
Club	Season	League			Cup (Note: Includes Suomen Cup)		League cup (Note: Includes Finnish League Cup and Ykkösliigacup)		Europe		Total	
Club	Season	Division	Apps	Goals	Apps	Goals	Apps	Goals	Apps	Goals	Apps	Goals
Honka Akatemia	2022	Kakkonen	21	19	–		–		–		21	19
Honka Akatemia	2023	Kakkonen	17	4	3	1	–		–		20	5
Honka Akatemia	Total		38	23	3	1	0	0	0	0	41	24
Honka	2023	Veikkausliiga	1	0	0	0	0	0	0	0	1	0
SalPa	2024	Ykkösliiga	6	0	2	2	4	0	–		12	2
Tampere United (loan)	2024	Kakkonen	11	8	–		–		–		11	8
Jazz	2025	Ykkönen	6	1	2	1	–		–		8	2
Career total			62	32	7	4	4	0	0	0	73	36
