= Benjamin Heikkinen =

Finnish footballer (born 2002)

Personal information
- Date of birth: 16 December 2002 (age 23)
- Place of birth: Finland
- Height: 1.76 m (5 ft 9 in)
- Position: Midfielder

Team information
- Current team: Honka
- Number: 11

Youth career
- –2014: HJK
- 2015–2016: PK Keski-Uusimaa
- 2017–2020: KäPa

Senior career*
Years	Team	Apps	(Gls)
2020	KäPa	17	(3)
2021	Honka	3	(0)
2021–2022	Honka II	34	(4)
2022	→ Pargas IF (loan)	15	(4)
2023	KPV	0	(0)
2024	KäPa	23	(3)
2024	→ NJS (loan)	1	(1)
2025–	Honka	52	(9)
- * Club domestic league appearances and goals as of 8 November 2026

Benjamin Heikkinen (born 16 December 2002) is a Finnish professional football midfielder playing for Kakkonen club Honka.

== Personal life ==
His twin brother Daniel is also a footballer.
