= Hannes Woivalin =

Finnish footballer (born 2002)

Personal information
- Date of birth: 18 May 2002 (age 24)
- Place of birth: Finland
- Position: Central midfielder

Team information
- Current team: Honka

Youth career
- –2019: Honka

Senior career*
Years	Team	Apps	(Gls)
2019–2022	Honka II	58	(4)
2021–2022	Honka	1	(0)
2023–2026	Gnistan	42	(1)
2026–	Honka	0	(0)
- * Club domestic league appearances and goals as of 9 March 2026

Hannes Woivalin (born 18 May 2002) is a Finnish professional football player who plays as a central midfielder for Kakkonen side Honka.

== Club career ==
Woivalin made his Veikkausliiga debut for Honka first team in 2021.

On 30 December 2022, he signed with IF Gnistan in second-tier Ykkönen. On 12 January 2024, his deal with Gnistan was extended until the end of 2025, after the club had won a promotion to Veikkausliiga for the 2024 season.

== Career statistics ==
As of 26 February 2025

Appearances and goals by club, season and competition
Club	Season	League			Cup (Note: Includes Suomen Cup)		League cup (Note: Includes Ykköscup and Finnish League Cup)		Total	
Club	Season	Division	Apps	Goals	Apps	Goals	Apps	Goals	Apps	Goals
Honka Akatemia	2019	Kakkonen	1	0	1	0	–		2	0
Honka Akatemia	2020	Kakkonen	14	1	2	0	–		16	1
Honka Akatemia	2021	Kakkonen	17	2	–		–		17	2
Honka Akatemia	2022	Kakkonen	26	1	–		–		26	1
Honka Akatemia	Total		58	4	3	0	0	0	71	4
Honka	2021	Veikkausliiga	1	0	–		–		1	0
Gnistan	2023	Ykkönen	28	1	3	1	6	1	37	3
Gnistan	2024	Veikkausliiga	12	0	2	0	5	0	19	0
Gnistan	2025	Veikkausliiga	0	0	0	0	4	1	4	1
Gnistan	Total		40	1	5	1	15	2	60	4
Career total			99	5	8	1	15	2	122	8

== Honours ==
Gnistan

- Ykkönen runner-up: 2023
