= Yassin Daoussi =

Finnish footballer (born 2000)

Personal information
- Date of birth: 2 June 2000 (age 26)
- Place of birth: Vantaa, Finland
- Height: 1.78 m (5 ft 10 in)
- Position: Right-back

Team information
- Current team: VPS
- Number: 24

Youth career
- Hakunilan Riento
- KOPSE
- –2017: PK Keski-Uusimaa

Senior career*
Years	Team	Apps	(Gls)
2015	Legirus Inter	1	(0)
2017–2018	Käpylän Pallo	27	(2)
2019	NJS	22	(1)
2020–2021	MP	46	(3)
2022	Ekenäs IF	27	(0)
2023–2024	AC Oulu	42	(4)
2025	Ekenäs IF	11	(3)
2025–	VPS	38	(2)

International career^{‡}
	Finland U16	1	(0)
2016	Finland U17	1	(0)
Medal record
AC Oulu
Second place	Finnish League Cup	2023
- * Club domestic league appearances and goals as of 13 November 2026 ‡ National team caps and goals as of 7 July 2023

Yassin Daoussi (born 2 June 2000) is a Finnish professional footballer who plays as a right-back for VPS in Veikkausliiga.

== Club career ==
Daoussi started playing football with Hakunilan Riento in Vantaa. He also played in the youth sectors of Korson Palloseura (KOPSE) and Pallokerho Keski-Uusimaa (PKKU). In the beginning of his senior career, Daoussi played three seasons in third-tier Kakkonen with Käpylän Pallo (KäPa) and Nurmijärven Jalkapalloseura (NJS), and three seasons in second-tier Ykkönen with Mikkelin Palloilijat (MP) and Ekenäs IF, respectively.

On 3 November 2022, Daoussi signed with AC Oulu ahead of the 2023 Veikkausliiga season, on a one-year deal with an option for an additional year. He made his debut in Veikkausliiga on 5 April 2023, in the opening game against KTP, playing full 90 minutes in 2–0 away victory. He scored his first goal in the league on 22 July 2023, in a 3–1 home win against KTP.

On 14 November 2023, AC Oulu announced that they had exercised their option and Daoussi's contract was extended for the 2024 season.

In February 2025 he returned to EIF.

In July 2025, Daoussi signed with Vaasan Palloseura in Veikkausliiga.

== International career ==
Daoussi has represented Finland at under-16 and under-17 youth national team level.

== Personal life ==
Born and raised in Finland, Daoussi is also of Moroccan descent.

== Career statistics ==
As of 13 November 2026

Appearances and goals by club, season and competition
Club	Season	League			Cup (Note: Includes Suomen Cup)		League cup (Note: Includes Ykkönen Cup and Finnish League Cup)		Europe		Total	
Club	Season	Division	Apps	Goals	Apps	Goals	Apps	Goals	Apps	Goals	Apps	Goals
Legirus Inter	2015	Nelonen	1	0	–		–		–		1	0
KäPa	2017	Kakkonen	8	2	0	0	—		—		8	2
KäPa	2018	Kakkonen	19	0	0	0	—		—		19	0
KäPa	Total		27	2	0	0	0	0	0	0	27	2
NJS	2019	Kakkonen	22	1	0	0	—		—		22	1
MP	2020	Ykkönen	20	1	6	0	—		—		26	1
MP	2021	Ykkönen	26	2	3	0	—		—		29	2
MP	Total		46	3	9	0	0	0	0	0	55	3
Ekenäs IF	2022	Ykkönen	27	0	3	0	4	0	—		34	0
AC Oulu	2023	Veikkausliiga	22	1	5	0	6	1	—		33	2
AC Oulu	2024	Veikkausliiga	20	3	2	0	5	0	—		27	3
AC Oulu	Total		42	4	7	0	11	1	0	0	60	5
Ekenäs IF	2025	Ykkösliiga	11	3	4	1	2	1	–		17	5
VPS	2025	Veikkausliiga	13	1	–		–		–		13	1
VPS	2026	Veikkausliiga	25	1	5	2	5	0	–		35	3
VPS	Total		38	2	5	2	5	0	0	0	48	4
Career total			214	15	28	3	22	2	0	0	264	20

== Honours ==
=== AC Oulu ===
- Finnish League Cup runner-up: 2023
