= UK-Tekonurmi =

Artificial turf pitch in Port, Finland

Coordinates: 61.4766°N 21.7712°E

- Address: Metsämiehenkatu 19; Pori; Finland
- Owner: City of Pori
- Surface: Artificial turf, heated
- Field size: 110 × 68 m

Construction
- Opened: 2009

Tenant
- FC Jazz (Ykkönen) 2025-present Musan Salama (Kakkonen) 2025-present Pori Bears (II-divisioona)

UK-Tekonurmi (sponsored as Panda Turva Areena) is an artificial turf pitch located at the Pori Sports Centre, Finland. It serves as the home ground for the football club FC Jazz. The pitch also features markings for American football.

Rubber granulate was originally used as the infill material for the artificial turf but was replaced in 2023 with coated BioFlex sand in compliance with EU regulations. Temporary rented stands currently with 500 seats are scheduled to be replaced by a stand with 1,500 seats for the 2027 football season. Plans for the 2030s include stands with a capacity of over 3,000 spectators, meeting the requirements for Veikkausliiga matches and boys' and girls' international games for which UEFA funding could be sought. The same plan incorporates new media facilities, an announcer's booth, VIP areas, six changing rooms, four concession stands, and a new electronic scoreboard.
