= Jokerit FC (2012) =

Jokerit F.C.
- Full name: Jokerit F.C. Helsinki 2012
- Nickname: The Jokers
- Short name: JFC, Jokerit
- Founded: 2012
- Stadium: Brahenkenttä
- Capacity: 1,200
- Manager: Tomi Jaskara
- League: Nelonen
- Website: https://www.jokeritfc.fi/

Jokerit FC is a football club based in Helsinki, Finland which competes in the Finnish Fourth Division, Nelonen. The club is the "phoenix club" of FC Jokerit, who were founded in 1999 and were sold to rivals HJK Helsinki in 2004, and re-branded as Klubi 04. The club plays on Brahenkenttä in Helsinki.

== Current Squad ==
As of 21 April 2026 Note: Flags indicate national team as defined under FIFA eligibility rules; some limited exceptions apply. Players may hold more than one non-FIFA nationality.

No.	Pos.	Nation	Player
1	GK	FIN	Jesse Viljanen
2	DF		Poch Luak
4	DF	FIN	Niklas Pynnönen
5	MF	FIN	Gene Salmi
6	DF	FIN	Jere Tuovinen
7	FW	FIN	Jesse Heinänen
8	MF	FIN	Jere Koskinen
10	MF	FIN	Aleksi Köninki
11	FW	FIN	Markus Tukiainen
12	DF	FIN	Santeri Jaakkola (C)
13	FW	MEX	Edgar Pelayo
14	FW	FIN	Niilo Viheriäranta
16	FW	FIN	Eelis Lehtinen
18	DF	FIN	Toomas Heinolainen

No.	Pos.	Nation	Player
19	MF	FIN	Lari Kylliäinen
20	DF	FIN	Rami Tinttunen
22	FW	FIN	Joel Pitkänen
23	GK	FIN	Tomi Jaskara
25	FW	ARG	Leandro Roco
27	FW	FIN	Patrick Bäcklund
31	GK	FIN	Jesse Viljanen
32	GK	FIN	Joona Karhunen
34	DF	FIN	Jerry Karhunen
35	DF	FIN	Markus Jussila
44	MF	FIN	Toni Monola
99	FW		Ashirwadh Ganesh
—	MF	FIN	Niko Nevalainen

== Achievements ==
Jokerit FC first competed in the Finnish Cup in the 2014/2015 season, reaching the 3rd round. They have reached the third round of the Finnish Cup twice, losing to FC Viikingit II 1-5 the first time, and to Töölön Wesa 0-2 the second time. In 2026, they reached the fourth round in which they played against HIFK, a notable rival of Jokerit in ice hockey. The match attracted a record attendance of 2457 viewers. HIFK won the match 0-5.

== Coaching staff ==
Name	Role	Nationality
Tomi Jaskara	Head coach	Finland
Toomas Heinolainen	Club Manager	Finland
Mikko Westerholm	Club Manager	Finland

== Reserve team ==
Jokerit FC/2
- Full name: Jokerit FC/2
- Nickname: The Jokers
- Short name: JFC
- Founded: 2012
- Manager: Toomas Heinolainen
- League: Kutonen
- Website: https://www.jokeritfc.fi/

Jokerit FC/2 is the reserve team of Jokerit FC.

=== Jokerit FC/2 squad ===
Below is the list of Jokerit FC/2's players.

As of 21 April 2026

Name	Number	Nationality
Poch Luak	#2	
Eemeli Juntunen	#5	Finland
Jere Tuovinen	#6	Finland
Ariel Vuorio	#7	Finland
Juhani Ojanen	#9	Finland
Mikko Westerholm	#17	Finland
Toomas Heinolainen	#18	Finland
Rami Tinttunen	#20	Finland
Tomi Jaskara	#23	Finland
Sami Ahonen	#24	Finland
Mikko Piippa	#33	Finland
Markus Jussila	#35	Finland
Timo Nousiainen	#37	Finland
Tommi Päivinen	#41	Finland
Aleksi Korhonen	#44	Finland
Joni Koistinen	#52	Finland
Antonio Rodriguez	#94	

== Under-8's Teams ==
FC Jokerit have run coaching sessions and an under-8's section for children since the foundation of the club in 2012. The sessions are run by the club's manager, Unto Virkkala, and the club's Academy manager, Jussi Marttila. The Under-8's section play fixtures during the week. Most of the club's players have come up through these sections.
