= Kalle Wallius =

Finnish footballer (born 2003)

Personal information
- Full name: Kalle Erik Juhani Wallius
- Date of birth: 2 January 2003 (age 23)
- Place of birth: Helsinki, Finland
- Height: 1.70 m (5 ft 7 in)
- Position: Right-back

Team information
- Current team: Ilves
- Number: 13

Youth career
- –2012: HPS
- 2013–2020: HJK
- 2022–2023: Bologna

Senior career*
Years	Team	Apps	(Gls)
2019–2021	Klubi 04	42	(4)
2023–2024	Start	12	(0)
2023–2024	Start 2	9	(3)
2024	→ IFK Mariehamn (loan)	7	(0)
2025–	Ilves	42	(1)

International career^{‡}
2019	Finland U16	5	(3)
2019–2020	Finland U17	12	(0)
2021–2022	Finland U19	7	(0)
2021	Finland U20	1	(0)
2023–2025	Finland U21	20	(0)
- * Club domestic league appearances and goals as of 13 November 2026 ‡ National team caps and goals as of 18 June 2025

Kalle Erik Juhani Wallius (born 2 January 2003) is a Finnish professional footballer who plays as a right-back for Veikkausliiga club Ilves. Wallius began his career with HPS, and made his senior debut aged 16 in 2019 with Klubi 04. He has represented some of the youth nationalteams for Finland.

== Club career ==
=== HJK ===
Wallius started football in Helsingin Palloseura, before joining the youth sector of HJK Helsinki in 2013. He advanced through the ranks of the club's youth academy and made his senior debut with the reserve team Klubi 04 in 2019. He played for Klubi 04 until the end of the 2021 season, before joining Italian club Bologna in January 2022 for an undisclosed fee.

=== Start ===
After a one-and-a-half-year stint with the Bologna academy team in Primavera youth league, Wallius signed with Norwegian club Start on 8 August 2023, on a deal until the end of 2026. In August 2024, he was loaned out to Veikkausliiga club IFK Mariehamn for the remainder of the season.

=== Ilves ===
On 29 January 2025, Wallius moved to Ilves on a two-year deal. He made his debut for Ilves on 1 February 2025 in a Finnish League Cup match against AC Oulu.

== International career ==
Wallius has represented Finland at various youth international levels.

Since 2023, he has played for the Finland U21 national team. Wallius made 10 appearances in the 2025 UEFA Euro U21 Championship qualification campaign, helping Finland to qualify for the final tournament for the second time in the nation's history, by defeating Norway in the play-offs.

== Career statistics ==
As of 6 June 2025

Appearances and goals by club, season and competition
Club	Season	League			National cup (Note: Includes Suomen Cup)		League cup (Note: Includes Finnish League Cup)		Europe		Total	
Club	Season	Division	Apps	Goals	Apps	Goals	Apps	Goals	Apps	Goals	Apps	Goals
Klubi 04	2019	Kakkonen	0	0	1	0	–		–		1	0
Klubi 04	2020	Kakkonen	17	1	1	0	–		–		18	1
Klubi 04	2021	Ykkönen	25	3	1	0	–		–		26	3
Klubi 04	Total		42	4	3	0	0	0	0	0	45	4
Start	2023	1. divisjon	8	0	0	0	–		–		8	0
Start	2024	1. divisjon	4	0	0	0	–		–		4	0
Start	Total		12	0	0	0	0	0	0	0	12	0
Start 2	2023	3. divisjon	5	2	–		–		–		5	2
Start 2	2024	3. divisjon	4	1	–		–		–		4	1
Start 2	Total		9	3	0	0	0	0	0	0	9	3
IFK Mariehamn (loan)	2024	Veikkausliiga	7	0	–		–		–		7	0
Ilves	2025	Veikkausliiga	6	0	1	0	4	0	0	0	11	0
Career total			76	7	4	0	4	0	0	0	84	7
