= Elias Äijälä =

Finnish footballer (born 2003)

Personal information
- Full name: Elias Mikko Ilmari Äijälä
- Date of birth: 24 March 2003 (age 23)
- Place of birth: Espoo, Finland
- Height: 1.79 m (5 ft 10 in)
- Position: Defender

Team information
- Current team: Honka
- Number: 3

Youth career
- 2011–2023: Honka

Senior career*
Years	Team	Apps	(Gls)
2020–2023	Honka II	27	(0)
2022–2023	Honka	29	(0)
2024	Gnistan	20	(1)
2024	→ PKKU (loan)	1	(0)
2025–	Honka	51	(4)

International career^{‡}
2024	Finland U21	2	(0)
Medal record
Honka
First place	Finnish League Cup	2022
Second place	Finnish Cup	2023
- * Club domestic league appearances and goals as of 8 November 2026 ‡ National team caps and goals as of 9 June 2024

Elias Mikko Ilmari Äijälä (born 24 March 2003) is a Finnish professional football player who plays as a full back for Kakkonen side Honka.

== Career ==
Äijälä started in a youth sector of Honka, when he was eight years old. He made his Veikkausliiga debut with Honka first team in 2022. After the 2023 season, Honka was suddenly declared for bankruptcy, and Äijälä was released.

On 16 January 2024, Äijälä signed a one-year deal with newly promoted Veikkausliiga side IF Gnistan. He scored his first goal in Veikkausliiga on 30 June, in a 2–1 home defeat against Ekenäs IF.

In January 2025, he returned to Honka.

== International career ==
Äijälä was called up to the Finland under-21 national team for a friendly tournament Baltic Cup in early June 2024. He played in two games against Estonia and Lithuania.

== Career statistics ==
As of 4 November 2024.

Appearances and goals by club, season and competition
Club	Season	League			Cup (Note: Includes Suomen Cup)		League cup (Note: Includes Finnish League Cup)		Europe		Total	
Club	Season	Division	Apps	Goals	Apps	Goals	Apps	Goals	Apps	Goals	Apps	Goals
Honka Akatemia	2020	Kakkonen	1	0	–		–		–		1	0
Honka Akatemia	2021	Kakkonen	14	0	–		–		–		14	0
Honka Akatemia	2022	Kakkonen	6	0	–		–		–		6	0
Honka Akatemia	2023	Kakkonen	6	0	–		–		–		6	0
Honka Akatemia	Total		27	0	0	0	0	0	0	0	27	0
Honka	2022	Veikkausliiga	18	0	1	0	2	0	–		21	0
Honka	2023	Veikkausliiga	11	0	3	0	5	0	2 (Note: Appearances in UEFA Conference League)	0	21	0
Honka	Total		29	0	4	0	7	0	2	0	43	0
Gnistan	2024	Veikkausliiga	20	1	1	0	5	0	–		26	1
PK Keski-Uusimaa (loan)	2024	Ykkönen	1	0	–		–		–		1	0
Honka	2025	Kakkonen	0	0	0	0	–		–		0	0
Career total			77	1	5	0	12	0	2	0	96	1

== Honours ==
Honka

- Finnish League Cup: 2022
- Finnish Cup runner-up: 2023
