= Tobias Karkulowski =

Finnish footballer (born 2004)

Personal information
- Date of birth: 9 October 2004 (age 22)
- Place of birth: Finland
- Position: Defender

Team information
- Current team: TPS
- Number: 77

Youth career
- Kuusysi
- Reipas Lahti
- 2020–2021: Lahti
- 2022: KuPS

Senior career*
Years	Team	Apps	(Gls)
2022	KuPS II	15	(0)
2023	JäPS	25	(0)
2024	SJK	0	(0)
2024	SJK II	17	(0)
2024–2025	Lahti	26	(2)
2024	Reipas Lahti	2	(0)
2026–	TPS	15	(0)
- * Club domestic league appearances and goals as of 27 July 2026

Tobias Karkulowski (born 9 October 2004) is a Finnish professional footballer who plays as a defender for Veikkausliiga club TPS.

== Club career ==
Karkulowski signed with second-tier Ykkönen club Järvenpään Palloseura (JäPS) for the 2023 season.

On 21 November 2023, he switched teams after signing with SJK Akatemia, competing in the new second tier Ykkösliiga.

On 22 August 2024, Karkulowski returned to his hometown Lahti and signed with Veikkausliiga club FC Lahti. He debuted in Veikkausliiga on 1 September 2024, in a 1–1 away draw against Haka.

== Career statistics ==
As of 27 July 2026

Appearances and goals by club, season and competition
Club	Season	League			Cup (Note: Includes Suomen Cup)		League cup (Note: Includes Ykköscup, Finnish League Cup and Ykkösliigacup)		Europe		Total	
Club	Season	Division	Apps	Goals	Apps	Goals	Apps	Goals	Apps	Goals	Apps	Goals
KuPS Akatemia	2022	Kakkonen	15	0	–		–		–		15	0
JäPS	2023	Ykkönen	25	0	2	0	6	0	–		33	0
SJK	2024	Veikkausliiga	0	0	2	0	2	0	–		4	0
SJK Akatemia	2024	Ykkösliiga	17	0	0	0	6	0	–		23	0
Reipas Lahti	2024	Kakkonen	2	0	–		–		–		2	0
Lahti	2024	Veikkausliiga	1	0	–		–		–		1	0
Lahti	2025	Ykkösliiga	26	2	1	0	5	1	–		15	2
Lahti	Total		27	2	1	0	5	1	0	0	33	3
TPS	2026	Veikkausliiga	15	0	4	1	4	0	–		23	1
Career total			106	2	9	1	23	1	0	0	138	4
