= Samba Sillah =

Finnish footballer (born 1999)

Personal information
- Date of birth: 10 January 1999 (age 27)
- Place of birth: Vaasa, Finland
- Height: 1.80 m (5 ft 11 in)
- Position: Left back

Team information
- Current team: KäPa
- Number: 11

Youth career
- VPS
- –2016: VIFK
- 2016–2017: VPS

Senior career*
Years	Team	Apps	(Gls)
2017–2018	VIFK	17	(2)
2018	Jaro	16	(0)
2019–2020	VPS II	4	(0)
2019–2022	VPS	63	(6)
2023	Jaro	17	(0)
2024–2025	PK-35	35	(6)
2026–	KäPa	21	(1)
- * Club domestic league appearances and goals as of 20 October 2026

Samba Sillah (born 10 January 1999) is a Finnish professional footballer who plays as a left back for Ykkösliiga club KäPa.

== Club career ==
Sillah has played 31 matches in Veikkausliiga with Vaasan Palloseura (VPS), scoring two goals in the league. He signed with second-tier Ykkösliiga club PK-35 for the 2024 season.

== Personal life ==
Born and raised in Finland, Sillah is of Gambian descent.

== Career statistics ==
As of 26 October 2024.

Appearances and goals by club, season and competition
Club	Season	League			Cup		League cup (Note: Includes Finnish League Cup and Ykkösliigacup)		Europe		Total	
Club	Season	Division	Apps	Goals	Apps	Goals	Apps	Goals	Apps	Goals	Apps	Goals
Vasa IFK	2017	Kakkonen	17	2	–		–		–		17	2
Vasa IFK	2018	Kakkonen	0	0	2	1	–		–		2	1
Vasa IFK	Total		17	2	2	1	0	0	0	0	19	3
Jaro	2018	Ykkönen	16	0	4	2	–		–		20	2
VPS Akatemia	2019	Kakkonen	3	0	–		–		–		3	0
VPS Akatemia	2020	Kolmonen	1	0	–		–		–		1	0
VPS Akatemia	Total		4	0	0	0	0	0	0	0	4	0
VPS	2019	Veikkausliiga	17	1	6	0	–		–		23	1
VPS	2020	Ykkönen	12	1	5	0	–		–		17	1
VPS	2021	Ykkönen	20	3	4	0	–		–		24	3
VPS	2022	Veikkausliiga	14	1	3	2	2	0	–		19	3
VPS	Total		63	6	18	2	2	0	0	0	83	8
Jaro	2023	Ykkönen	17	0	1	0	0	0	–		18	0
PK-35	2024	Ykkösliiga	21	5	3	0	5	0	–		29	5
Career total			128	13	28	5	7	0	0	0	163	18
