= Akon Kuek =

Finnish footballer (born 2004)

Personal information
- Date of birth: 10 May 2004 (age 22)
- Place of birth: Finland
- Height: 1.78 m (5 ft 10 in)
- Position: Central midfielder

Team information
- Current team: VPS
- Number: 33

Youth career
- –2016: Kiisto
- 2016–2023: VPS

Senior career*
Years	Team	Apps	(Gls)
2021–	VPS II	70	(38)
2022–	VPS	9	(1)
2025	→ MP (loan)	22	(3)
- * Club domestic league appearances and goals as of 24 July 2026

Akon Kuek (born 10 May 2004) is a Finnish professional football player, playing as a midfielder for VPS.

== Club career ==
Kuek debuted in Veikkausliiga with his hometown club Vaasan Palloseura (VPS) in the 2023 season. On 15 October 2022, Kuek extended his contract with the club on a two-year deal. On 2 January 2025, he extended his deal again until the end of 2026.

== Career statistics ==
As of 17 February 2025

Appearances and goals by club, season and competition
Club	Season	League			Cup (Note: Includes Suomen Cup)		League cup (Note: Includes Finnish League Cup)		Europe		Total	
Club	Season	Division	Apps	Goals	Apps	Goals	Apps	Goals	Apps	Goals	Apps	Goals
VPS Akatemia	2021	Kolmonen	2	1	–		–		–		2	1
VPS Akatemia	2022	Kolmonen	22	7	–		–		–		22	7
VPS Akatemia	2023	Kolmonen	18	5	–		–		–		18	5
VPS Akatemia	2024	Kolmonen	17	12	–		–		–		17	12
VPS Akatemia	2025	Kakkonen	3	4	–		–		–		3	4
VPS Akatemia	Total		62	29	0	0	0	0	0	0	62	29
VPS	2022	Veikkausliiga	0	0	0	0	2	0	–		2	0
VPS	2023	Veikkausliiga	4	0	2	2	5	0	–		11	2
VPS	2024	Veikkausliiga	2	0	1	0	5	0	0	0	8	0
VPS	2025	Veikkausliiga	0	0	2	0	2	1	–		4	1
VPS	Total		6	0	5	2	14	1	0	0	25	3
MP (loan)	2025	Ykkönen	1	0	0	0	–		–		1	0
Career total			69	29	5	2	14	1	0	0	88	32
