= Amir Belabid =

Finnish footballer (born 2005)

Personal information
- Date of birth: 27 August 2005 (age 21)
- Place of birth: Lahti, Finland
- Height: 1.82 m (6 ft 0 in)
- Position: Centre-forward

Team information
- Current team: Lahti
- Number: 17

Youth career
- –2024: Reipas Lahti

Senior career*
| Years | Team | Apps | (Gls) |
| 2024– | Reipas Lahti | 40 | (14) |
| 2025– | Lahti | 22 | (4) |
- * Club domestic league appearances and goals as of 13 November 2026

Amir Belabid (Arabic: أمير بلعبيد; born 25 August 2005) is a Finnish professional footballer who plays as a centre-forward for Veikkausliiga club Lahti.
