= Daniel Heikkinen =

Finnish footballer (born 2002)

Personal information
- Date of birth: 16 December 2002 (age 23)
- Place of birth: Finland
- Height: 1.76 m (5 ft 9 in)
- Position: Midfielder

Team information
- Current team: Lahti
- Number: 7

Youth career
- –2014: HJK
- 2015–2016: PK Keski-Uusimaa
- 2017–2020: KäPa

Senior career*
Years	Team	Apps	(Gls)
2020	KäPa	17	(8)
2021–2022	Honka II	30	(10)
2021–2022	Honka	2	(0)
2022	→ PEPO (loan)	13	(1)
2023–2024	AC Oulu	8	(0)
2023–2024	→ OLS	20	(7)
2023	→ KäPa (loan)	9	(0)
2025–	Lahti	42	(3)
- * Club domestic league appearances and goals as of 13 November 2026

Daniel Heikkinen (born 16 December 2002) is a Finnish professional football midfielder playing for Veikkausliiga club Lahti.

== Personal life ==
His twin brother Benjamin is also a footballer.
