= Vilho Huovila =

Finnish footballer (born 2006)

Personal information
- Date of birth: 10 July 2006 (age 20)
- Place of birth: Kouvola, Finland
- Height: 1.84 m (6 ft 0 in)
- Position: Winger

Team information
- Current team: Inter Turku
- Number: 26

Youth career
- Sudet
- Valkealan Kajo
- 2021: Kuusysi
- 2021–2022: Lahti

Senior career*
Years	Team	Apps	(Gls)
2022–	Reipas Lahti	20	(7)
2022–2025	Lahti	31	(8)
2024	→ MP (loan)	13	(1)
2025–	Inter Turku	6	(0)
2026–	Inter Turku II	15	(2)

International career^{‡}
2021–2022	Finland U16	5	(2)
2022–2023	Finland U17	15	(1)
2023–	Finland U18	7	(3)
2024–	Finland U19	6	(0)
- * Club domestic league appearances and goals as of 12 November 2026 ‡ National team caps and goals as of 25 March 2025

Vilho Huovila (born 10 July 2006) is a Finnish professional footballer who plays as a winger for Veikkausliiga club Inter Turku.

== Early years ==
Huovila was born in Kouvola, and started playing football in his hometown clubs Sudet and Valkealan Kajo. He moved to Lahti in 2021 to join the FC Lahti organisation.

== Club career ==
=== FC Lahti ===
Since 2022, Huovila has played for FC Lahti's reserve team Reipas Lahti in the third tier Kakkonen.

On 18 October 2022, Huovila signed his first professional contract with the club at the age of 16, on a deal until the end of 2025. On 21 October 2023, Huovila scored a goal in his Veikkausliiga debut for FC Lahti first team, in a home loss against Ilves.

On 9 July 2024, Huovila was sent on loan to Mikkelin Palloilijat (MP) in second-tier Ykkösliiga for the rest of the season.

On 17 October 2025, Huovila joined Inter Turku on a two-year contract with an option to extend it with one more.

== International career ==
Huovila is a regular Finnish youth international and has represented Finland at various youth national team levels.

In September 2022, Huovila was named in the Finland U17 squad for the 2023 UEFA European Under-17 Championship qualification tournament against Greece, Italy and Kosovo, scoring one goal in three games. Finland finished 2nd in the group and qualified to the Elite round in March 2023.

== Career statistics ==
As of 28 April 2025

Appearances and goals by club, season and competition
Club	Season	League			Cup (Note: Includes Finnish Cup)		League cup (Note: Includes Finnish League Cup and Ykkösliigacup)		Europe		Total	
Club	Season	Division	Apps	Goals	Apps	Goals	Apps	Goals	Apps	Goals	Apps	Goals
Reipas Lahti	2022	Kakkonen	1	0	—		—		—		1	0
Reipas Lahti	2023	Kakkonen	14	6	—		—		—		14	6
Reipas Lahti	2024	Kakkonen	5	1	—		—		—		5	1
Reipas Lahti	Total		20	7	0	0	0	0	0	0	20	7
Lahti	2023	Veikkausliiga	1	1	2	0	1	0	—		4	1
Lahti	2024	Veikkausliiga	4	0	2	4	3	0	—		9	4
Lahti	2025	Ykkösliiga	2	2	1	0	5	2	–		8	3
Lahti	Total		7	3	5	4	9	2	0	0	21	9
MP (loan)	2024	Ykkösliiga	13	1	—		—		—		13	1
Career total			40	11	5	4	9	2	0	0	54	17
