= Pauli Katajamäki =

Finnish footballer (born 2002)

Personal information
- Date of birth: 4 January 2002 (age 24)
- Place of birth: Finland
- Height: 1.76 m (5 ft 9 in)
- Position: Midfielder

Team information
- Current team: Honka

Youth career
- Honka

Senior career*
Years	Team	Apps	(Gls)
2019–2023	Honka II	39	(5)
2021–2023	Honka	6	(0)
2023	→ SalPa (loan)	10	(0)
2024	Gnistan	7	(1)
2025–	Honka	0	(0)

International career
2019	Finland U17	6	(0)
2019	Finland U18	2	(0)
2021	Finland U20	1	(0)
- * Club domestic league appearances and goals as of 22 June 2024

Pauli Katajamäki (born 4 January 2002) is a Finnish professional football player who plays as a midfielder for Kakkonen side Honka.

== Club career ==
On 21 April 2023, Katajamäki was loaned out to Salon Palloilijat (SalPa) in the second-tier Ykkönen from Honka.

On 5 January 2024, he signed with newly promoted Veikkausliiga club Gnistan. On 13 April, Katajamäki scored his first Veikkausliiga goal, in a match against Ilves, helping his side to get a 6–4 away win.
