= 2025 Finnish Cup =

Tournament details
- Country: Finland
- Teams: 420

Final positions
- Champions: HJK
- Runners-up: KuPS

The 2025 Finnish Cup was the 71st season of the Finnish Cup football competition. The winners qualified for the 2026–27 Conference League second qualifying round. KuPS were the defending champions.

HJK won the cup (their fifteenth Finnish Cup win) on 20 September 2025, defeating KuPS 1–0 in the final.

== Calendar ==
Round	Dates	Draw	Clubs involved	Winners from previous round	New entries this round	Leagues entering this round
Round 0	7 February – 9 March 2025	30 January	248	-	248	Nelonen and lower levels (248 teams)
First round	7 February – 20 March 2025	30 January	240	124	116	Kolmonen and lower levels (116 teams)
Second round	10 – 30 March 2025	4 March	120	120	-	-
Third round	9 – 27 April 2025	2 April	112	60	52	Veikkausliiga (8 non-UEFA teams); Ykkösliiga (10 teams); Ykkönen (11 teams); Kakkonen (23 teams)
Fourth round	7 – 11 May 2025	29 April	56	56	-	-
Fifth round	28 May 2025	14 May	32	28	4	Veikkausliiga (4 UEFA Competitions-teams)
Sixth round	11 – 12 June 2025	14 May	16	16	-	-
Quarter-finals	24 – 25 June 2025	17 June	8	8	-	-
Semi-finals	20 – 21 August 2025	17 June	4	4	-	-
Final	20 September 2025	17 June	2	2	-	-

== Format ==
The cup is played as a one legged knockout tournament. Registration for the tournament ran from November 28, 2024 to January 8, 2025.

As of January 8, at least 420 teams (all-time record; the previous, 392, was set in 2005) have registered to participate in this anniversary year addition. Lower league teams received home advantage until the fourth round. Teams were divided into geographical groups for the draw until 5th round.

== Preliminary round ==
The draw for the preliminary round (Juuson Kierros in Finnish, in honor to Juuso Walden on this anniversary year) was made on 30 January 2025 at 4:00 PM (Finnish Time) on the Finnish Football Association's (Palloliito) YouTube channel. 248 teams participate in this round. They are divided into ten baskets based on geography.

Number of teams per tier still in competition
Veikkausliiga (1)	Ykkösliiga (2)	Ykkönen (3)	Kakkonen (4)	Kolmonen (5)	Nelonen (6)	Vitonen (7)	Kutonen (8)	Seiska (9)	M35 (+35)	Total
12 / 12	10 / 10	11 / 11	23 / 23	87 / 87	91 / 91	110 / 110	61 / 61	12 / 12	3 / 3	420 / 420

=== Group 1 ===
Match	Date	Time	Home team	Score	Away team	Report
Match 5	13 February 2025	18:30	LPS/reservi (7)	7–1	Valtti/3 (7)	Report
Match 21	15 February 2025	11:30	I-HK/Sensaatio (7)	1–7	KY United (7)	Report
Match 16	15 February 2025	17:00	AC StaSi (8)	0–6	Polin Pallo (6)	Report
Match 9	16 February 2025		HJK/Kantsu 94 (8)	3-0 w/o	FC OHO United (8)	Report
Match 23	16 February 2025	10:00	PPV/Seos (8)	0–6	EsPa/United (7)	Report
Match 24	16 February 2025	12:00	HPS/2 (6)	3–1	LPS/2 (6)	Report
Match 18	16 February 2025	20:00	Vesa (6)	2–2 (3–4 p)	SUMU (6)	Report
Match 10	22 February 2025	14:00	FC Samba (7)	0–1	MLHF (8)	Report
Match 14	22 February 2025	16:00	ToTe/Keparoi (7)	1–6	Olarin Kiksi (7)	Report
Match 15	22 February 2025	17:00	FC Dons/Akatemia (8)	3–7	JäPS/U23 (6)	Report
Match 7	22 February 2025	19:00	FC POHU (7)	3–3 (4–2 p)	Ponnistus/2 (7)	Report
Match 17	22 February 2025	20:30	PK-35/Äijät (9)	2–2 (3–4 p)	Ponnistus/Peruskallio (8)	Report
Match 13	28 February 2025	20:00	MPS/AtleticoAkatemia (7)	0–4	PETO (7)	Report
Match 2	1 March 2025	15:00	Valtti/TDJ (9)	0–18	FC Honka/3 (6)	Report
Match 3	1 March 2025	17:00	Kilo IF (7)	3–1	Chicken Wings (6)	Report
Match 1	1 March 2025	19:00	FC Kontu/KoVa (7)	0–5	Etu-Töölön Urhot (6)	Report
Match 4	1 March 2025	19:00	FC Puimur/Mando Utd (8)	0–4	StaPa De Royale (7)	Report
Match 8	2 March 2025	09:30	OT-77 (9)	1–10	FC Kontu/U23 (8)	Report
Match 22	3 March 2025	21:00	Gnistan/M35 (+35)	1–0	Kurvin Vauhti (6)	Report
Match 19	7 March 2025	20:00	HePu (7)	1–3	LePa/Cityboys (7)	Report
Match 11	7 March 2025	20:00	FC POHU/Kova Kamppi (9)	0–5	KoiPS/Dynamo (7)	Report
Match 12	8 March 2025	14:00	FC Germania/Akademie (8)	0–5	LePa (6)	Report
Match 20	8 March 2025	16:00	JäPS/City (8)	6–2	DFSV (8)	Report
Match 6	8 March 2025	16:00	PiTa/II (8)	0–3	TöTa/FC Mauskis (8)	Report
Match 25	9 March 2025	14:00	SAPA/2 (7)	0–1	FC POHU/Simpsons (7)	Report

=== Group 2 ===
Match	Date	Time	Home team	Score	Away team	Report
Match 16	9 February 2025	12:00	FC POHU/CJ United (8)	6–1	PPJ/Faijat Jätkäsaari (8)	Report
Match 19	12 February 2025	20:00	Pöxyt/M35 (+35)	17–0	FC Pakila (9)	Report
Match 9	14 February 2025	20:00	Andalus FC (7)	1–5	Kasiysi/2 (7)	Report
Match 14	15 February 2025	17:00	Pessoas Boas (8)	1–2	FC Nile (6)	Report
Match 7	15 February 2025	19:00	ToTe/Arabia (9)	1–2	Colo-Colo (6)	Report
Match 2	21 February 2025	20:00	FC Haxi (7)	0–0 (3–2 p)	Jokerit FC (6)	Report
Match 24	22 February 2025	17:00	FC Juvantus (8)	3–2	HH Palloveikot (8)	Report
Match 25	22 February 2025	19:00	Lännen Torpedo (8)	0–11	FC Kiffen/3 (6)	Report
Match 12	23 February 2025	10:00	HJK/Töölön Ihme (8)	1–6	Afro Foot Club (7)	Report
Match 1	23 February 2025	12:00	ToTe/U23 (7)	0–7	Gilla FC (6)	Report
Match 22	25 February 2025	18:30	JäPS/Akatemia (8)	4–0	FC Germania (7)	Report
Match 17	25 February 2025	20:00	TuPS/Skavaböle (7)	3–1	HPS/Jägers (8)	Report
Match 10	25 February 2025	21:00	Gnistan/3 (7)	4–0	KoiPS (6)	Report
Match 4	28 February 2025	20:00	FC Honka/Leopardit (7)	3–2	FC ST4Y (7)	Report
Match 8	1 March 2025	19:00	HooGee/23 (7)	2–0	AFG United (8)	Report
Match 3	2 March 2025	10:00	PiTa (7)	12–0	LePa/Via Alberga (7)	Report
Match 13	2 March 2025	10:00	Tavastia (7)	2–2 (4–5 p)	SUMU/sob (6)	Report
Match 18	2 March 2025	12:00	Helsinki Stars (8)	1–1 (3–5 p)	PEF (7)	Report
Match 11	8 March 2025	12:00	KPPK (7)	0–2	FC POHU/United (7)	Report
Match 21	8 March 2025	17:00	Valtti/4 (9)	0–15	PK-35/2 (7)	Report
Match 15	8 March 2025	18:00	FC POHU/Sober (9)	0–9	FC Spital (6)	Report
Match 5	8 March 2025	18:00	Kasiysi/3 (9)	0–3	Nikinmäki United (7)	Report
Match 20	9 March 2025	12:00	PPV (7)	0–4	FC Dons (6)	Report
Match 23	9 March 2025	16:00	FC Kontu/ST (8)	2–0	Strikers/Bertil (8)	Report
Match 6	9 March 2025	18:00	Ruila (8)	0–14	PPS/Old Stars (6)	Report

=== Group 3 ===
Match	Date	Time	Home team	Score	Away team	Report
Match 9	23 February 2025	13:00	KuuLa/2 (8)	0–2	Turun Into (7)	Report
Match 1	23 February 2025	19:00	KuuLa (6)	2–0	BK-46 (6)	Report
Match 6	24 February 2025	20:00	TuPV (8)	1–7	FC Bosna (7)	Report
Match 10	26 February 2025	20:10	TuNL (7)	1–1 (3–4 p)	Torre Calcio (7)	Report
Match 4	5 March 2025	20:00	Åbo reUnited (8)	0–1	AFC Campus (7)	Report
Match 2	5 March 2025	20:15	LTU 2 (8)	0–4	FC Inter 3 (7)	Report
Match 8	5 March 2025	21:00	ÅIFK/2 (7)	0–4	JyTy (6)	Report
Match 11	6 March 2025	21:00	FC Snåbit (7)	5–1	RaiFu 3 (7)	Report
Match 5	7 March 2025	19:00	FC RP (7)	2–3	SoVo (7)	Report
Match 3	8 March 2025	16:30	FC Boda (7)	2–3	TuWe (6)	Report
Match 7	8 March 2025	17:30	MaPS 2 (8)	1–1 (1–4 p)	FC HIK (7)	Report

=== Group 4 ===
Match	Date	Time	Home team	Score	Away team	Report
Match 4	9 February 2025	10:00	Ylöjärvi United FC/Marjastajat (8)	5–4	ACE/2 (7)	Report
Match 13	15 February 2025	18:00	Peräkylän Pallo (8)	4–0	FC Varapelaajat (8)	Report
Match 6	22 February 2025	14:00	NoPS 3 (8)	1–5	Gmestarit (7)	Report
Match 12	22 February 2025	16:10	LaVe/KPR (7)	1–0	PJK (6)	Report
Match 17	22 February 2025	19:00	TaPa/2 (7)	0–4	Fish United (6)	Report
Match 5	23 February 2025	14:45	Lavilan Kisa (7)	2–1	NePa (7)	Report
Match 2	23 February 2025	16:00	Karhu-Futis (7)	0–0 (4–3 p)	VaKP (6)	Report
Match 18	23 February 2025	18:30	TamFu (7)	2–1	FC Eurajoki (6)	Report
Match 7	25 February 2025	19:15	AC Darra (9)	2–2 (3–1 p)	FisU/2 (8)	Report
Match 19	26 February 2025	18:30	KOOVEE (8)	2–4	TamU/3 (8)	Report
Match 15	26 February 2025	19:15	FC Eurajoki/II (8)	0–7	PiPo-79 (6)	Report
Match 10	1 March 2025	13:00	Messukylä United (8)	4–1	ToVe Diesel (7)	Report
Match 11	1 March 2025	14:00	Velenpojat (9)	2–9	JanPa (7)	Report
Match 20	1 March 2025	18:15	FC Kangasala/2 (8)	2–2 (3–4 p)	Loiske Visa (7)	Report
Match 9	2 March 2025	14:00	HFN (8)	1–3	Ilves/4 (7)	Report
Match 3	2 March 2025	16:30	FC Lasten 2 (7)	4–0	LuVe (7)	Report
Match 1	8 March 2025	18:00	FC Helmi Jätkä (9)	0–15	FC LeKi (6)	Report
Match 14	8 March 2025	19:00	Ilves-Kissat Juniorit/2 (8)	2–10	Härmä (6)	Report
Match 16	8 March 2025	19:50	Tuisku (7)	2–0	FC Haka-j/Musta (7)	Report
Match 8	9 March 2025	09:00	FC Vapsi (8)	0–0 (9–8 p)	EuPa 2 (7)	Report

=== Group 5 ===
Match	Date	Time	Home team	Score	Away team	Report
Match 8	28 February 2025	18:30	LoPa (6)	6–0	FCFJ (6)	Report
Match 4	1 March 2025	14:05	KeiKa (8)	0–2	JäPS/United (7)	Report
Match 3	2 March 2025	15:00	LoPa/2 (7)	1–2	AskU (7)	Report
Match 1	3 March 2025	20:35	KelA/Akatemia (7)	4–1	HAlku (6)	Report
Match 7	7 March 2025	18:00	TuPS/M35 (+35)	4–2	RiPS/2 (7)	Report
Match 2	8 March 2025	15:00	FC Korso/United (7)	1–1 (3–1 p)	FC Wild (6)	Report
Match 5	8 March 2025	16:00	KOPSE/VI (8)	1–6	HyPS (6)	Report
Match 6	8 March 2025	18:15	HAlku/FC (8)	1–1 (11–12 p)	Akilles (6)	Report

=== Group 6 ===
Match	Date	Time	Home team	Score	Away team	Report
Match 1	21 February 2025	19:00	Flamingo United/2 (8)	1–14	LAUTP/2 (6)	Report
Match 8	23 February 2025	16:00	LuPo (6)	1–4	Jäntevä (6)	Report
Match 4	2 March 2025	15:00	MyPa/FC (8)	2–2 (2–3 p)	Lahden United (7)	Report
Match 7	2 March 2025	17:00	PaPe (7)	1–4	RPS Lions (6)	Report
Match 5	2 March 2025	18:30	HP-47 (7)	3–0	KyPa (7)	Report
Match 3	3 March 2025	20:00	HaPK 2 (7)	0–9	Nopsa (6)	Report
Match 6	9 March 2025	11:40	KarPo (8)	1–2	FC Lahti/3 (7)	Report
Match 2	9 March 2025	17:10	PoPo (8)	10–0	SiU (6)	Report
Match 9	9 March 2025	17:30	Korian Klubi (7)	2–1	Flamingo United (7)	Report

=== Group 7 ===
Match	Date	Time	Home team	Score	Away team	Report
Match 3	22 February 2025	16:00	KonnU (7)	2–4	FC Marski (6)	Report
Match 4	23 February 2025	16:00	MuurY (7)	3–1	FCV/Reds (6)	Report
Match 1	2 March 2025	13:40	Harjun Potku (8)	3–1	MiPK/2 (7)	Report
Match 5	2 March 2025	16:30	Huima/Urho 2 (6)	1–3	OuPa (6)	Report
Match 6	2 March 2025	18:00	FCV/Reds II (8)	2–1	Komeetat/3 (7)	Report
Match 2	8 March 2025	14:00	PaRi (6)	1–0	SaPa (6)	Report

=== Group 8 ===
Match	Date	Time	Home team	Score	Away team	Report
Match 3	20 February 2025	19:30	AC Kylän Poijjaat (7)	0–4	FC Tarzan (7)	Report
Match 2	27 February 2025	19:30	KuKi (6)	0–1	PAVE (6)	Report
Match 1	1 March 2025	14:30	Raiku (7)	1–0	SuPS (7)	Report

=== Group 9 ===
Match	Date	Time	Home team	Score	Away team	Report
Match 1	17 February 2025	19:45	IK (7)	3–2	Karhu (6)	Report
Match 7	23 February 2025	17:00	Tarmo (8)	2–3	Norrvalla FF (6)	Report
Match 5	28 February 2025	20:45	APV (6)	2–3	KPS (6)	Report
Match 4	1 March 2025	13:45	KJV/Kanu (8)	3–1	LappBK (8)	Report
Match 8	1 March 2025	19:15	LUJA (7)	3–2	Lapuan Ponnistus (7)	Report
Match 6	5 March 2025	21:00	BK-48/3 (8)	1–6	BK-48/2 (7)	Report
Match 9	7 March 2025	20:30	KoPo (6)	1–14	Esse IK (6)	Report
Match 3	8 March 2025	17:15	FC Kuffen (8)	1–4	FC KoMu (7)	Report
Match 2	9 March 2025	20:30	Sisu/2 (8)	0–9	Virkiä (6)	Report

=== Group 10 ===
Match	Date	Time	Home team	Score	Away team	Report
Match 5	9 February 2025	12:15	JPJ (7)	0–0 (4–5 p)	KTU (6)	Report
Match 1	16 February 2025	12:15	KKP (7)	0–0 (4–3 p)	HC Laatupallo (7)	Report
Match 6	23 February 2025	16:15	Ruusut FC (7)	5–0	PonPa/2 (6)	Report
Match 2	23 February 2025	17:00	Kolarin Kontio (7)	1–6	FC Santa Claus/2 (7)	Report
Match 3	1 March 2025	10:15	Heinäpään Hanhet (7)	0–1	OuTa (6)	Report
Match 8	1 March 2025	15:15	OuJK (7)	3–0	SoPa (7)	Report
Match 7	2 March 2025	14:15	Puleward City (7)	9–0	Kairan Kärki FC (7)	Report
Match 4	2 March 2025	16:15	OTP/Akatemia (7)	1–2	FC RIO GRANDE (7)	Report

== Round 1 ==
The Round 1 draw was made on the same day as Round 0 on the Finnish Football Association's (Palloliito) YouTube channel. 240 teams (including 124 winners from preliminary round), participated in this round. They were divided into ten sections based on geography. The winners proceeded to Round 2.

Number of teams per tier still in competition
Veikkausliiga (1)	Ykkösliiga (2)	Ykkönen (3)	Kakkonen (4)	Kolmonen (5)	Nelonen (6)	Vitonen (7)	Kutonen (8)	Seiska (9)	M35 (+35)	Total
12 / 12	10 / 10	11 / 11	23 / 23	87 / 87	68 / 91	62 / 110	19 / 61	1 / 12	3 / 3	296 / 420

=== Group 1 ===
Match	Date	Time	Home team	Score	Away team	Report
Match 10	28 February 2025	20:00	FC Hieho (6)	4–2	FC Kirkkonummi (6)	Report
Match 15	8 March 2025	19:00	LPS/reservi (7)	0–1	FC Kontu (5)	Report
Match 20	9 March 2025	12:00	FC POHU/Hurjin (6)	2–1	MPS (5)	Report
Match 7	9 March 2025	20:00	SUMU (6)	3–4	HooGee (5)	Report
Match 21	10 March 2025	20:05	Kasiysi (6)	0–1	Polin Pallo (6)	Report
Match 18	14 March 2025	20:00	Ponnistus/Peruskallio (8)	0–7	Ponnistajat (5)	Report
Match 16	14 Match 2025	20:00	Kilo IF (7)	0–7	Etu-Töölön Urhot (6)	Report
Match 2	15 March 2025	12:00	KY United (7)	1–0	KoiPS/Dynamo (7)	Report
Match 9	15 March 2025	16:00	FC POHU (7)	0–6	Toukolan Teräs (5)	Report
Match 4	15 March 2025	17:30	EsPa/United (7)	0–13	PPJ/Lauttasaari (5)	Report
Match 13	15 March 2025	18:00	MLHF (8)	0–5	HPS/2 (6)	Report
Match 17	15 March 2025	20:10	HJK/Kantsu 94 (8)	0–9	FC Honka/3 (6)	Report
Match 12	16 March 2025	19:00	Olarin Kiksi (7)	1–3	HIFK (5)	Report
Match 3	16 March 2025	20:00	TöTa/FC Mauskis (8)	1–6	Tikka (5)	Report
Match 11	18 March 2025	18:30	JäPS/City (8)	2–7	JäPS/U23 (6)	Report
Match 1	18 March 2025	20:00	LePa (6)	1–5	EPS/Reservi (5)	Report
Match 6	18 March 2025	21:00	Gnistan/M35 (+35)	2–2 (3–2 p)	Pöxyt/TNT (6)	Report
Match 8	22 March 2025	18:00	FC Kontu/U23 (8)	0–6	Valtti (5)	Report
Match 14	23 March 2025	12:00	StaPa De Royale (7)	0–5	Atlantis FC/PM (5)	Report
Match 19	23 March 2025	14:00	LePa/Cityboys (7)	0–0 (4–1 p)	PETO (7)	Report
Match 5	23 March 2025	20:00	FC POHU/Simpsons (7)	0–4	EsPa/Renat (5)	Report

=== Group 2 ===
Match	Date	Time	Home team	Score	Away team	Report
Match 17	2 March 2025	11:00	MK-United (6)	2–3	FC Espoo (5)	Report
Match 8	9 March 2025	17:00	FC Honka/Leopardit (7)	0–6	LPS (5)	Report
Match 13	9 March 2025	20:00	Töölön Taisto (5)	1–1 (3–2 p)	MPS/Atletico Malmi (5)	Report
Match 6	10 March 2025	20:00	LePa/Bangers (6)	2–2 (2–3 p)	VJS/2 (5)	Report
Match 9	11 March 2025	18:30	JäPS/Akatemia (8)	2–0	PEP (6)	Report
Match 19	11 March 2025	20:00	PEF (7)	0–2	SUMU/sob (6)	Report
Match 16	11 March 2025	21:00	Gnistan/3 (7)	5–0	TuPS/Skavaböle (7)	Report
Match 7	13 March 2025	21:00	GrIFK/Akatemia (5)	3–0	FC Haxi (7)	Report
Match 3	14 Match 2025	20:00	PiTa (7)	2–5	Gilla FC (6)	Report
Match 20	15 March 2025	14:00	FC POHU/CJ United (8)	5–0	Colo-Colo (6)	Report
Match 14	15 March 2025	19:00	Valtti/2 (6)	4–2	FC Kiffen/3 (6)	Report
Match 5	15 March 2025	19:00	Afro Foot Club (7)	2–7	Ponnistus (5)	Report
Match 12	15 March 2025	19:30	HooGee/23 (7)	11–0	Nikinmäki United (7)	Report
Match 11	16 March 2025	18:00	FC POHU/United (7)	3–1	SAPA (6)	Report
Match 2	17 March 2025	20:00	Pöxyt/M35 (+35)	3–0	FC Spital (6)	Report
Match 21	17 March 2025	20:00	Kasiysi/2 (7)	0–7	FC Nile (6)	Report
Match 4	18 March 2025	20:00	EBK (5)	15–0	FC Juvantus (8)	Report
Match 15	19 March 2025	18:00	PK-35/2 (7)	3–7	PPS/Old Stars (6)	Report
Match 1	21 March 2025	20:00	FC Dons (6)	0–4	EsPa (5)	Report
Match 10	23 March 2025	17:00	TiPS (5)	1–0	HJK/Kantsu (5)	Report
Match 18	24 March 2025	19:45	SexyPöxyt (5)	10–0	FC Kontu/ST (8)	Report

=== Group 3 ===
Match	Date	Time	Home team	Score	Away team	Report
Match 3	27 February 2025	18:10	ÅIFK (5)	3–1	KaaPo (5)	Report
Match 4	28 February 2025	19:30	LTU (5)	5–0	PiPS (5)	Report
Match 10	1 March 2025	18:00	ÅCF (6)	2–0	EIF/Akademi (5)	Report
Match 8	7 March 2025	19:45	VG-62 (5)	2–2 (5–6 p)	SalPa 2 (5)	Report
Match 9	8 March 2025	18:15	Torre Calcio (7)	2–4	KuuLa (6)	Report
Match 5	15 March 2025	16:00	SoVo (7)	0–0 (1–4 p)	Masku (5)	Report
Match 11	16 March 2025	16:10	AFC Campus (7)	2–5	EuPa (5)	Report
Match 1	18 March 2025	20:15	FC Inter 3 (7)	0–2	PIF (5)	Report
Match 7	19 March 2025	19:00	Turun Into (7)	5–1	FC HIK (7)	Report
Match 6	19 March 2025	20:00	FC Bosna (7)	1–1 (4–3 p)	TuWe (6)	Report
Match 2	19 March 2025	21:00	JyTy (6)	7–0	FC Snåbit (7)	Report

=== Group 4 ===
Match	Date	Time	Home team	Score	Away team	Report
Match 11	27 February 2025	19:00	TPV/2 (5)	1–1 (3–5 p)	Ylöjärvi United FC (5)	Report
Match 3	6 March 2025	19:00	Karhu-Futis (7)	3–5	FC Kangasala (6)	Report
Match 1	8 March 2025	18:00	Ilves/3 (6)	0–12	TamU/2 (5)	Report
Match 8	8 March 2025	20:00	Ylöjärvi United FC/Marjastajat (8)	2–3	FC Lasten 2 (7)	Report
Match 5	9 March 2025	16:00	Lavilan Kisa (7)	2–8	FC Lasten (5)	Report
Match 16	9 March 2025	20:00	TP-T (5)	2–1	FC Haka j. (5)	Report
Match 10	14 Match 2025	19:15	AC Darra (9)	0–11	Loiske (5)	Report
Match 13	15 March 2025	12:00	Gmestarit (7)	1–0	TamFu (7)	Report
Match 14	15 March 2025	17:45	Fish United (6)	0–3	NoPS (5)	Report
Match 6	16 March 2025	11:00	Messukylä United (8)	0–4	ACE (5)	Report
Match 12	16 March 2025	13:00	Peräkylän Pallo (8)	1–3	Tuisku (7)	Report
Match 2	16 March 2025	15:00	FC LeKi (6)	5–2	ToVe (5)	Result
Match 7	16 March 2025	15:00	FC Vapsi (8)	1–2	JanPa (7)	Report
Match 15	16 March 2025	20:00	TamU/3 (8)	3–2	PiPo-79 (6)	Report
Match 9	21 March 2025	20:10	LaVe/KPR (7)	0–6	Härmä (6)	Report
Match 4	23 March 2025	18:30	Ilves/4 (7)	4–2	Loiske Visa (7)	Report

=== Group 5 ===
Match	Date	Time	Home team	Score	Away team	Report
Match 8	1 March 2025	15:00	KelA (6)	0–4	Sibbo-Vargarna (5)	Report
Match 4	6 March 2025	20:00	TuPS (5)	2–1	PKKU/2 (5)	Report
Match 9	8 March 2025	12:00	JäPS/United (7)	0–4	RiPS (5)	Report
Match 7	8 March 2025	18:00	ToBK (6)	3–2	NuPS/2 (6)	Report
Match 6	12 Match 2025	18:30	LoPa (6)	1–2	JäPS/47 (5)	Report
Match 2	17 March 2025	19:30	HyPS (6)	6–2	FC Korso/United (7)	Report
Match 5	17 March 2025	20:35	KelA/Akatemia (7)	1–0	Akilles (6)	Report
Match 1	19 March 2025	20:00	TuPS/M35 (+35)	2–8	NuPS (5)	Report
Match 3	22 March 2025	13:00	AskU (7)	0–2	FC Futura (5)	Report

=== Group 6 ===
Match	Date	Time	Home team	Score	Away team	Report
Match 8	2 March 2025	14:30	LAUTP/2 (6)	1–5	Union Plaani (5)	Report
Match 10	8 March 2025	15:00	FC LaPa (5)	1–5	FC Lahti/69 (5)	Report
Match 4	9 March 2025	16:00	KoPa (5)	0–7	KJP (5)	Report
Match 5	14 March 2025	19:30	FC Lahti/3 (7)	3–1	Kumu (6)	Report
Match 2	15 March 2025	15:00	Jäntevä (6)	2–0	Lappee JK (6)	Report
Match 6	15 March 2025	18:30	HP-47 (7)	4–1	Nopsa (6)	Report
Match 3	16 March 2025	20:00	RPS Lions (6)	0–5	IPS (5)	Report
Match 1	17 March 2025	19:10	PoPo (8)	6–0	FC Loviisa (6)	Report
Match 7	18 March 2025	20:00	Korian Klubi (7)	0–7	Kultsu FC (5)	Report
Match 9	22 March 2025	13:00	Lahden United (7)	0–3	LAUTP (5)	Report

=== Group 7 ===
Match	Date	Time	Home team	Score	Away team	Report
Match 9	15 February 2025	16:00	Huima/Urho (5)	5–1	STPS (5)	Report
Match 10	18 February 2025	19:00	MP/2 (5)	3–3 (3–2 p)	MiPK (5)	Report
Match 7	1 March 2025	14:15	Komeetat/Piuku (6)	0–1	NiemU (5)	Report
Match 4	1 March 2025	17:00	ViPa (5)	5–2	Ylämyllyn Yllätys (5)	Report
Match 5	9 March 2025	16:00	AFC Keltik (6)	0–2	Rangers (5)	Report
Match 2	15 March 2025	12:00	PaRi (6)	3–5	Komeetat (5)	Report
Match 6	16 March 2025	12:00	OuPa (6)	1–5	LehPa (5)	Report
Match 1	16 March 2025	14:00	Harjun Potku (8)	1–7	FC Soho (6)	Report
Match 8	16 March 2025	18:00	MuurY (7)	5–3	FC Marski (6)	Report
Match 3	23 March 2025	15:15	FCV/Reds II (8)	1–1 (6–5 p)	SC Riverball (6)	Report

=== Group 8 ===
Match	Date	Time	Home team	Score	Away team	Report
Match 1	2 March 2025	12:00	KuPS Akatemia II (6)	0–1	KajHa (5)	Report
Match 4	14 March 2025	19:30	FC Tarzan (7)	0–2	PK-37 (5)	Report
Match 2	16 March 2025	13:00	PAVE (6)	0–2	ToU (5)	Report
Match 3	16 March 2025	14:00	Raiku (7)	0–6	Zulimanit (5)	Report

=== Group 9 ===
Match	Date	Time	Home team	Score	Away team	Report
Match 4	8 March 2025	20:30	Sisu (5)	0–2	KeuPa (5)	Report
Match 2	9 March 2025	14:00	Kaskö IK (6)	2–6	VPV (5)	Report
Match 7	15 March 2025	20:15	LUJA (7)	0–2	Esse IK (6)	Report
Match 8	16 March 2025	11:45	KJV/Kanu (8)	1–8	FC Ylivieska (5)	Report
Match 10	16 March 2025	19:45	KPS (6)	0–1	SJK-j (5)	Report
Match 3	19 March 2025	18:30	IK (7)	0–15	FC Kiisto (5)	Report
Match 9	19 March 2025	19:00	BK-48/2 (7)	1–3	SIF (5)	Report
Match 5	19 March 2025	19:00	Norrvalla FF (6)	2–2 (2–3 p)	Sääripotku (5)	Report
Match 6	21 March 2025	21:00	Virkiä (6)	5–0	Kungliga Wasa C.F. (6)	Report
Match 1	22 March 2025	16:15	FC KoMu (7)	2–4	NIK (6)	Report

=== Group 10 ===
Match	Date	Time	Home team	Score	Away team	Report
Match 6	22 February 2025	10:15	HauPa/2 (6)	0–7	HauPa (5)	Report
Match 7	22 February 2025	21:00	PonPa (5)	2–0	KePS (5)	Report
Match 1	23 February 2025	14:00	FC Santa Claus (6)	4–1	Ajax (5)	Report
Match 2	8 March 2025	17:00	FC RIO GRANDE (7)	3–3 (4–5 p)	KTU (6)	Report
Match 3	16 March 2025	12:15	OuJK (7)	0–2	Puleward City (7)	Report
Match 5	16 March 2025	14:15	OuTa (6)	4–2	RoPo (5)	Report
Match 4	16 March 2025	16:15	KKP (7)	0–6	OTP (5)	Report
Match 8	16 March 2025	18:00	FC Santa Claus/2 (7)	2–5	Ruusut FC (7)	Report

== Round 2 ==
The draw was made on 4 March 2025 at 12:00 AM (Finnish Time) on the Finnish Football Association's (Palloliito) YouTube channel. 120 winners from Round 1 participate in this round. Winners advance to Round 3.

Number of teams per tier still in competition
Veikkausliiga (1)	Ykkösliiga (2)	Ykkönen (3)	Kakkonen (4)	Kolmonen (5)	Nelonen (6)	Vitonen (7)	Kutonen (8)	Seiska (9)	M35 (+35)	Total
12 / 12	10 / 10	11 / 11	23 / 23	67 / 87	28 / 91	18 / 110	5 / 61	0 / 12	2 / 3	176 / 420

=== Group 1 ===
Match	Date	Time	Home team	Score	Away team	Report
Match 2	22 March 2025	15:00	Sibbo-Vargarna (5)	2–3	RiPS (5)	Report
Match 11	23 March 2025	18:30	LPS (5)	4–3	FC Espoo (5)	Report
Match 25	24 March 2025	21:00	Gnistan/M35 (+35)	5–0	SUMU/sob (6)	Report
Match 4	25 March 2025	21:00	Gnistan/3 (7)	1–2	VJS/2 (5)	Report
Match 14	26 March 2025	19:00	FC Futura (5)	4–0	HooGee (5)	Report
Match 6	27 March 2025	19:00	FC Kontu (5)	5–0	Ponnistus (5)	Report
Match 21	28 March 2025	19:00	EPS/Reservi (5)	3–2	GrIFK/Akatemia (5)	Report
Match 12	28 March 2025	20:00	KY United (7)	1–8	HIFK (5)	Report
Match 23	28 March 2025	20:00	FC Hieho (6)	1–5	Atlantis FC/PM (5)	Report
Match 20	29 March 2025	13:00	ToBK (6)	2–1	Tikka (5)	Report
Match 15	29 March 2025	14:00	TuPS (5)	0–0 (5–6 p)	Toukolan Teräs (5)	Report
Match 22	29 March 2025	17:00	FC POHU/United (7)	0–2	Ponnistajat (5)	Report
Match 13	29 March 2025	17:00	Etu-Töölön Urhot (6)	1–4	EsPa (5)	Report
Match 7	29 March 2025	17:30	HyPS (6)	0–6	FC Honka/3 (6)	Report
Match 1	29 March 2025	19:00	KelA/Akatemia (7)	2–1	FC Nile (6)	Report
Match 9	29 March 2025	19:00	FC POHU/CJ United (8)	2–4	Valtti (5)	Report
Match 5	29 March 2025	20:00	HPS/2 (6)	1–5	EBK (5)	Report
Match 3	30 March 2025	13:00	JäPS/Akatemia (8)	2–2 (5–4 p)	HooGee/23 (7)	Report
Match 10	30 March 2025	14:15	FC POHU/Hurjin (6)	1–2	Töölön Taisto (5)	Report
Match 24	30 March 2025	14:30	Gilla FC (6)	6–0	Valtti/2 (6)	Report
Match 19	30 March 2025	16:00	JäPS/U23 (6)	0–3	JäPS/47 (5)	Report
Match 17	30 March 2025	19:00	LePa/Cityboys (7)	0–1	Polin Pallo (6)	Report
Match 16	31 March 2025	20:00	Pöxyt/M35 (+35)	1–6	SexyPöxyt (5)	Report
Match 18	31 March 2025	20:05	PPS/Old Stars (6)	3–6	EsPa/Renat (5)	Report
Match 8	31 March 2025	20:30	TiPS (5)	3–1	PPJ/Lauttasaari (5)	Report

=== Group 2 ===
Match	Date	Time	Home team	Score	Away team	Report
Match 3	25 March 2025	18:30	JyTy (6)	6–1	EuPa (5)	Report
Match 1	26 March 2025	20:00	ÅCF (6)	1–1 (3–5 p)	NuPS (5)	Report
Match 2	27 March 2025	19:00	Turun Into (7)	0–4	LTU (5)	Report
Match 5	27 March 2025	20:00	KuuLa (6)	1–7	SalPa 2 (5)	Report
Match 4	29 March 2025	14:00	Masku (5)	1–1 (5–4 p)	PIF (5)	Report
Match 6	1 April 2025	19:00	FC Bosna (7)	0–7	ÅIFK (5)	Report

=== Group 3 ===
The match result between Tuisku and Loiske changed to 3-0, due to ineligible player in Loiske squad (KM 25.1.).

Match	Date	Time	Home team	Score	Away team	Report
Match 6	23 March 2025	17:00	FC Kangasala (6)	2–0	Ylöjärvi United FC (5)	Report
Match 2	25 March 2025	20:00	FC Lasten (5)	6–2	ACE (5)	Report
Match 1	29 March 2025	14:00	JanPa (7)	0–2	TamU/2 (5)	Report
Match 5	29 March 2025	19:00	FC Lasten 2 (7)	0–1	TP-T (5)	Report
Match 8	30 March 2025	14:45	TamU/3 (8)	2–2 (6–5 p)	Gmestarit (7)	Report
Match 7	30 March 2025	17:00	Tuisku (7)	3–0	Loiske (5)	Report
Match 4	30 March 2025	17:00	FC LeKi (6)	1–1 (1–3 p)	NoPS (5)	Report
Match 3	1 April 2025	20:00	Ilves/4 (7)	3–3 (2–4 p)	Härmä (6)	Report

=== Group 4 ===
Match	Date	Time	Home team	Score	Away team	Report
Match 1	28 March 2025	19:10	PoPo (8)	13–2	FC Lahti/3 (7)	Report
Match 5	29 March 2025	18:30	Union Plaani (5)	1–0	Kultsu FC (5)	Report
Match 3	30 March 2025	15:00	Jäntevä (6)	0–5	FC Lahti/69 (5)	Report
Match 4	30 March 2025	17:30	HP-47 (7)	1–5	LAUTP (5)	Report
Match 2	30 March 2025	20:00	IPS (5)	3–3 (3–2 p)	KJP (5)	Report

=== Group 5 ===
Match	Date	Time	Home team	Score	Away team	Report
Match 3	22 March 2025	16:00	Komeetat (5)	0–3	Rangers (5)	Report
Match 1	29 March 2025	14:10	NiemU (5)	4–0	MP/2 (5)	Report
Match 2	29 March 2025	16:00	Huima/Urho (5)	5–1	ViPa (5)	Report
Match 5	29 March 2025	20:00	FC Soho (6)	2–1	LehPa (5)	Report
Match 4	30 March 2025	20:15	FCV/Reds II (8)	4–6	MuurY (7)	Report

=== Group 6 ===
Match	Date	Time	Home team	Score	Away team	Report
Match 2	30 March 2025	14:00	KajHa (5)	4–3	PK-37 (5)	Report
Match 1	30 March 2025	18:30	Zulimanit (5)	2–3	ToU (5)	Report

=== Group 7 ===
Match	Date	Time	Home team	Score	Away team	Report
Match 4	29 March 2025	13:00	NIK (6)	0–5	VPV (5)	Report
Match 2	29 March 2025	16:00	Esse IK (6)	1–3	FC Kiisto (5)	Report
Match 3	29 March 2025	17:00	SJK-j (5)	3–0	FC Ylivieska (5)	Report
Match 1	30 March 2025	14:00	Virkiä (6)	5–1	SIF (5)	Report
Match 5	5 April 2025	18:00	Sääripotku (5)	3–7	KeuPa (5)	Report

=== Group 8 ===
Match	Date	Time	Home team	Score	Away team	Report
Match 3	22 March 2025	17:30	FC Santa Claus (6)	7–1	KTU (6)	Report
Match 1	26 March 2025	19:30	Ruusut FC (7)	0–6	PonPa (5)	Report
Match 4	30 March 2025	11:15	OuTa (6)	1–2	HauPa (5)	Report
Match 2	30 March 2025	13:15	Puleward City (7)	0–0 (4–5 p)	OTP (5)	Report

== Round 3 ==
The draw was made on 2 April 2025 on the Football Association's (Palloliito) YouTube channel. 60 winners from Round 1 + 52 new entrants (8 Veikkausliiga teams, in previous seasons was 6 teams; all 10 teams from Ykkösliiga, all registered teams from Ykkönen and Kakkonen) are participate in this round. Winners advance to Round 4.

Number of teams per tier still in competition
Veikkausliiga (1)	Ykkösliiga (2)	Ykkönen (3)	Kakkonen (4)	Kolmonen (5)	Nelonen (6)	Vitonen (7)	Kutonen (8)	Seiska (9)	M35 (+35)	Total
12 / 12	10 / 10	11 / 11	23 / 23	43 / 87	10 / 91	3 / 110	3 / 61	0 / 12	1 / 3	116 / 420

=== Group 1 ===
9 April 2025	Toukolan Teräs (5)	2–2 (3–4 p)	NJS (4)	Helsinki
18:00	Lindqvist 47'; Julie 62'	Report	Uzun 7'; Mukuna 13'	Stadium: Lauttasaari TN; Attendance: 50; Referee: Roberto Miranda

9 April 2025	Töölön Taisto (5)	1–1 (2–4 p)	JäPS/47 (5)	Helsinki
18:15	Kettunen 30'	Report	Taskos 13'	Stadium: Töölö PK 3 TN; Attendance: 40; Referee: Reko Morikawa

9 April 2025	Polin Pallo (6)	2–5	RiPS (5)	Espoo
20:00	Lehtimaki 11'; Simpson 82'	Report	Zolameso 19', 90+3'; Mäyränen 26', 59', 90'	Stadium: Perkkaanniitty TN; Attendance: 20; Referee: Joonatan Palviainen

9 April 2025	EsPa/Renat (5)	0–6	EsPa (5)	Espoo
20:15		Report	Makitaro 33'; Ansa 63'; Sakeus 73'; Pinomaa 76'; Saito 84'; Roivainen 88'	Stadium: Matinkylä 2 TN; Attendance: 50; Referee: Veikka Marttila

12 April 2025	HIFK (5)	3–2	Atlantis FC/PM (5)	Helsinki
17:00	Tiquinho 36', 61'; Ulmanen 49'	Report	Lomidze (manager) (red card) 33'; Siradze 34'; Luht (yellow card) 54' (yellow-red card) 60'; Karttunen 73'	Stadium: Väinämöinen TN; Attendance: 199; Referee: Miika Pesonen

13 April 2025	TiPS (5)	0–6	PK-35 (2)	Vantaa
13:30		Report	Beyai 6'; Pitkälä 33' (pen.); Ayuub 41'; Own goal 50' (o.g.); Sillah 65'; Mehmeti 78'	Stadium: Tikkurila TN; Referee: Matti Roth

15 April 2025	EPS/Reservi (5)	1–4	Atlantis FC (3)	Espoo
17:30	Zaknoun 33'	Report	Ejeh 31', 90+3'; Katashira 51'; Bekhedda 61'	Stadium: Espoonlahden urheilupuisto 2 Attendance: 70; Referee: Ifeoma Kulmala

15 April 2025	GrIFK (4)	1–2	IFK Mariehamn (1)	Kauniainen
18:30	Kallio 15'; Hellstén (red card) 90+4'	Report	Andersson 70'; Lundberg 81'	Stadium: Kauniaisten Keskuskenttä; Attendance: 503; Referee: Juuso Vuorinen

15 April 2025	VJS (4)	2–0	EPS (3)	Myyrmäki
19:00	Kouakou (red card) 44'; Saksinen 58'; Horii 66'	Report		Stadium: Jalkapallostadion TN; Attendance: 720; Referee: Peiman Simani

15 April 2025	FC Futura (5)	0–7	JäPS (2)	Porvoo
19:00		Report	Ahadi 35', 43'; Kuosa 40'; Söderlund 59', 65', 86'; Sivunen 66'	Stadium: Pallokenttä TN; Attendance: 223; Referee: Niko Jokinen

15 April 2025	LPS (5)	1–1 (4–3 p)	PKKU (3)	Laajasalo
19:30	Simonen 2'	Report	Romppanen 20'	Stadium: Saari Areena; Referee: Otto Helin

15 April 2025	HPS (4)	0–4	KäPa (2)	Helsinki
19:30			Huhtamaki 21'; Kallio 29', 66'; Haapiainen 65'	Stadium: JYA AREENA

16 April 2025	JäPS/Akatemia (8)	0–5	FC Kiffen (4)
18:30			Maliki 12', 17', 64'; Karjalainen 78', 90'

16 April 2025	FC Kontu (5)	0–9	FC Honka (4)	Helsinki
19:00			Pyyskänen 11', 38'; Hämäläinen 40'; Haikala 45'; Saarikivi 49'; Onuoha 55'; Liikonen 65', 90'; Own goal 86'	Stadium: Kontulan liikuntapuisto

16 April 2025	Ponnistajat (5)	1–4	PPJ (4)
20:00	Sillanpaa 43'		Kahelin 21'; Puttonen 38'; Own goal 49'; Ouazine 85'

16 April 2025	Gnistan/M35 (+35)	0–5	Gnistan (1)
20:15			Atarah 12'; Hafstad 53'; Latonen 67', 83'; Lappalainen 69'

22 April 2025	FC Honka/3 (6)	1–2	EBK (5)
20:10	Saarinen 86'		Vettenranta 5', 25'

20 April 2025	Gilla FC (6)	1–1 (10–9 p)	Valtti (5)	Myyrmäki
19:30	Rantanen 82'; Markkula (red card) 20'	Report	Own goal 76'	Stadium: Myyrmäen jalkapallostadion Referee: Joonas Kovapohja

27 April 2025	ToBK (6)	1–2	SexyPöxyt (5)	Sipoo
14:00	Eriksson 12'	Report	Osogo 88'; Kuusisto 90+4'; Varik (red card) 67'	Stadium: Söderkullan urheilukenttä Referee: Ibrahim Aksoy

16 April 2025	VJS/2 (5)	1–3	PuiU (4)	Myyrmäki, Vantaa
19:45 CEST (UTC+02:00)	Varis 90'	Report	Sinkkilä 9', 11'; Abdirashid Haji 25'	Stadium: Myyrmäen Jalkapallostadion; Referee: Anssi Juurinen

17 April 2025	KelA/Akatemia (7)	0–10	Klubi 04 (2)	Järvenpää
19:30		Report	Toivonen 15', 52'; Hardén 17'; Noori 39'; Baranov 47', 63'; Ingman 61'; Sabwele Loy 64'; Rippon 69', 79'	Stadium: Keskusurheilukenttä; Attendance: 250; Referee: Oskari Tuomi

=== Group 2 ===
15 April 2025	Tuisku (7)	0–6	EIF (2)	Orivesi
18:00		Report	Pimentel 1'; Stenius 13', 70'; Stynes 30', 32'; Ojala 80'	Stadium: Rovastinkangas TN; Attendance: 192; Referee: Jere Holappa

15 April 2025	NuPS (5)	0–2	HJS (4)	Nummela
19:00		Report	Nagy 62'; Thusberg 64'	Stadium: Ojamart areena TN; Attendance: 170; Referee: Miika Pesonen

15 April 2025	LTU (5)	0–3	FC Jazz (3)	Littoinen
19:00		Report	Rantanen 38'; Majaluoma 48' (pen.); Bradbury 74'	Stadium: Littoinen TN; Attendance: 328; Referee: Einari Sario

15 April 2025	Tampere United (3)	0–3	TPS (2)	Tampere
19:00		Report	Muzaci 22'; Kawakita 24'; Ikonen 85'	Stadium: Tammelan Stadion; Attendance: 719; Referee: Lassi Siukkola

15 April 2025	FC Lasten (5)	0–4	FC Inter (1)
20:00			Sarr 4'; Botué 36', 38'; Guei 89'

16 April 2025	JyTy (6)	1–2	SalPa (2)
18:00	Siltanen 63'		Gassamá 36'; Rautiola 70'

16 April 2025	FC Kangasala (6)	0–2	SalPa 2 (5)
19:00			Serdarević 8', 15'

16 April 2025	MuSa (4)	3–5	Ilves/2 (4)	Musa
19:00	Simeon 11'; Laine 20'; Männistö 89'		Tamminen 41'; Koivuniemi 77', 81'; Väisänen 82'; Own goal 88'	Stadium: Musan kenttä

16 April 2025	Masku (5)	1–1 (2–3 p)	P-Iirot (4)	Masku
19:00	Oksanen 14'		Koivu 74'	Stadium: Taponkedon kenttä

16 April 2025	Härmä (6)	1–3	TamU/2 (5)	Hämeenlinna
20:45	Lindroos 44'		Trawally 9'; Käsper 60'; Suominen 70'	Stadium: Kaurialan kenttä

22 April 2025	TamU/3 (8)	0–7	TPV (4)	Tampere
20:00		Report	Puustinen 14'; Riikonen 44'; Anttila 44', 61'; Dieter 52'; Toijala 75', 84'	Stadium: Kauppi 1 TN; Attendance: 70; Referee: Jere Holappa

20 April 2025	TP-T (5)	0–5	VPS (1)	Tampere
19:00		Report	Rönnberg 12'; Lakkamäki 43'; Jakonen 70'; Fleuriau Chateau 75'; Smyth 87'	Stadium: Pyynikin Urheilukenttä; Referee: Lotta Vuorio

17 April 2025	ÅIFK (5)	2–0	NoPS (5)	Turku
18:30	Kaari 57'; Honkasalo 83'	Report		Stadium: Yläkenttä; Referee: Aleksi Keronen

=== Group 3 ===
12 April 2025	NiemU (5)	1–0	MyPa (4)	Joensuu
14:10	Laatikainen 26'	Report		Stadium: Hope Areena TN; Attendance: 111; Referee: Vladislav Dirgin

12 April 2025	Reipas (4)	2–1	FC Lahti (2)	Lahti
16:00	Haziri 39'; Paalanen 60'	Report	Babiker 90+1'	Stadium: Kisapuisto 1 TN; Attendance: 660; Referee: Turo Veini

12 April 2025	FC Vaajakoski (4)	4–2	PEPO (4)	Jyväskylä
18:45	Yahagi 20', 87'; Liimatainen 48', 90+2'	Report	Jammeh 53'; Jäppinen 60'	Stadium: Huhtahalli TN; Attendance: 201; Referee: Minka Vekkeli

13 April 2025	MuurY (7)	0–6	JIPPO (2)	Muurame
18:00		Report	Partanen 36'; Huhtala 54'; Smith 57'; Viitaniemi 72'; Kiuru 87'; Pihlaja 89'	Stadium: Muurame TN; Attendance: 389; Referee: Vilho Jokinen

15 April 2025	Huima/Urho (5)	4–0	LAUTP (5)	Äänekoski
19:00	Voikar 3'; Duka 45'; Rutanen 66'; Suutari 90'	Report		Stadium: Keskuskenttä TN; Attendance: 318; Referee: Juuso Korppi

16 April 2025	ToU (5)	0–8	FC Haka (1)
17:00			Lucas Cini 4', 13', 74'; Multanen 53', 80', 88', 89'; Purosalo 62'

16 April 2025	KuPS Akatemia (3)	3–3 (5–4 p)	JJK (3)
18:30	Ylönen 1', 32'; Mattila 20'		Akdogan 43'; A. Ciriaco 77'; Rintamäki 90+6'

16 April 2025	Rangers (5)	0–2	HaPK (4)
18:30			Lassila 45+2'; Hjelm 88'

16 April 2025	FC Lahti/69 (5)	1–5	KTP (1)	Lahti
19:00	Ahlfors 10'		Banza 11'; Glasson 20', 24'; Huhtamäki 52'; Seck 60'	Stadium: Lahden kisapuisto

FC Soho (6)	–	MP (3)

PoPo (8)	–	IPS (5)

KeuPa (5)	–	Union Plaani (5)

=== Group 4 ===
11 April 2025	OTP (5)	1–8	VPS Akatemia (4)	Oulu
18:00	Ibiyomi 59'	Report	Mäntymäki 13'; Keturi 16', 49', 72'; Visuri 66', 73'; Forsbacka 76'; Monola 85'	Stadium: Heinäpää PH TN; Attendance: 110; Referee: Tatu Korkalainen

13 April 2025	Virkiä (6)	2–5	GBK (4)	Lapua
14:00	A. Takala 21'; Niemelä 50'	Report	Uwaegbulam 14', 39'; Huldén 44'; Kytölaakso 90'; Åkerblom 90+7'	Stadium: Lapuan keskuskenttä Attendance: 121; Referee: Mikko Juusola

14 April 2025	FC Santa Claus (6)	1–4	Hercules (4)	Rovaniemi
18:00	Salmela 25'	Report	Sipola 16'; Korkala 57'; Riihiaho 73'; Karppelin 89'	Stadium: Saarenkylän Stadion; Attendance: 427; Referee: Mikko Rantala

15 April 2025	JBK (4)	0–0 (5–6 p)	RoPS (3)	Jakobstad
18:30		Report		Stadium: Tellushallen TN; Attendance: 140; Referee: Robin Kuloaro

15 April 2025	VIFK (4)	2–2 (3–4 p)	FF Jaro (1)	Vaasa
19:00	Morrissey 12' (pen.), 22'	Report	Vikström 34'; Sotelo 70'	Stadium: Kamratvallen TN; Referee: Mikko Juusola

15 April 2025	FC Kiisto (5)	0–2	OLS (3)	Vaasa
19:00		Report	Raittinen 36'; Räisänen 45'	Stadium: Lemonsoft Stadium; Attendance: 60; Referee: Valtteri Huhta

16 April 2025	PonPa (5)	1–3	AC Oulu (1)
18:00	Anttila 10'		Pitkänen 25'; J. Paananen 61', 78'

HauPa (5)	–	KajHa (5)

SJK-j (5)	–	SJK Akatemia (2)

VPV (5)	–	KPV (3)

== Round 6 ==
The 16 Round 5 winners entered Round 6.

Number of teams per tier still in competition
Veikkausliiga (1)	Ykkösliiga (2)	Ykkönen (3)	Kakkonen (4)	Kolmonen (5)	Nelonen (6)	Vitonen (7)	Kutonen (8)	Seiska (9)	M35 (+35)	Total
9 / 12	3 / 10	4 / 10	0 / 22	0 / 82	0 / 77	0 / 86	0 / 49	0 / 10	0 / 6	16 / 364

10 June 2025	Oulu (1)	1–1 (7–6 p)	PK-35 (2)	Oulu
16:00				Stadium: Raatti Stadium

11 June 2025	Klubi 04 (2)	4–3	IFK Mariehamn (1)	Helsinki
13:00				Stadium: Töölö Football Stadium

11 June 2025	Haka (1)	3–2	Gnistan (1)	Valkeakoski
16:00				Stadium: Tehtaan kenttä

11 June 2025	OLS Oulu (3)	0–1	EIF (2)	Oulu
16:00				Stadium: Raatti Stadium

11 June 2025	Jaro (1)	2–2 (5–4 p)	VPS (1)	Jakobstad
16:30				Stadium: Project Liv Arena

11 June 2025	SJK (1)	7–0	KPV (3)	Seinäjoki
16:30				Stadium: OmaSP Stadion

11 June 2025	MP (3)	0–1	HJK (1)	Mikkeli
17:00				Stadium: Mikkelin Urheilupuisto

11 June 2025	Jazz Pori (3)	2–6	KuPS (1)	Pori
17:00

== Quarter-finals ==
The 8 quarter-final winners entered the semi-finals.

Number of teams per tier still in competition
Veikkausliiga (1)	Ykkösliiga (2)	Ykkönen (3)	Kakkonen (4)	Kolmonen (5)	Nelonen (6)	Vitonen (7)	Kutonen (8)	Seiska (9)	M35 (+35)	Total
6 / 12	2 / 10	0 / 10	0 / 22	0 / 82	0 / 77	0 / 86	0 / 49	0 / 10	0 / 6	8 / 364

24 June 2025	Klubi 04 (2)	0–4	HJK (1)	Helsinki
10:00				Stadium: Töölö Football Stadium

24 June 2025	Haka (1)	1–1 (0–3 p)	KuPS (1)	Valkeakoski
16:00				Stadium: Tehtaan kenttä

24 June 2025	Oulu (1)	2–0	SJK (1)	Oulu
16:00				Stadium: Raatti Stadium

24 June 2025	EIF (2)	2–4	Jaro (1)	Ekenäs
16:30				Stadium: Ekenäs Sparbank Arena

== Semi-finals ==
The 4 quarter-final winners entered the semi-finals.

Number of teams per tier still in competition
Veikkausliiga (1)	Ykkösliiga (2)	Ykkönen (3)	Kakkonen (4)	Kolmonen (5)	Nelonen (6)	Vitonen (7)	Kutonen (8)	Seiska (9)	M35 (+35)	Total
4 / 12	0 / 10	0 / 10	0 / 22	0 / 82	0 / 77	0 / 86	0 / 49	0 / 10	0 / 6	4 / 364

21 August 2025	HJK (1)	1–0	Oulu (1)	Helsinki
17:00				Stadium: Töölö Football Stadium

10 September 2025	KuPS (1)	2–0	Jaro (1)	Kuopio
18:00				Stadium: Kuopio Football Stadium

== Final ==
The final was held between the two semi-final winners.

Number of teams per tier still in competition
Veikkausliiga (1)	Ykkösliiga (2)	Ykkönen (3)	Kakkonen (4)	Kolmonen (5)	Nelonen (6)	Vitonen (7)	Kutonen (8)	Seiska (9)	M35 (+35)	Total
2 / 12	0 / 10	0 / 10	0 / 22	0 / 82	0 / 77	0 / 86	0 / 49	0 / 10	0 / 6	2 / 364

20 September 2025	HJK (1)	1–0	KuPS (1)	Tampere
16:00	Pukki 57'	Report		Stadium: Tammelan Stadion; Attendance: 5,355; Referee: Peiman Simani
