= Roope Huhtala =

Finnish footballer (born 2000)

Personal information
- Date of birth: 21 June 2000 (age 26)
- Place of birth: Tampere, Finland
- Height: 1.83 m (6 ft 0 in)
- Position: Centre back

Team information
- Current team: Jippo
- Number: 5

Youth career
- –2016: PJK
- Ilves

Senior career*
Years	Team	Apps	(Gls)
2016	PJK	1	(0)
2017–2019	Ilves II	17	(2)
2017–2019	Ilves	4	(0)
2018	→ HJS (loan)	12	(0)
2019	→ TPV (loan)	9	(0)
2020	HJS	12	(0)
2021–2022	PEPO	49	(9)
2023	KäPa	26	(7)
2024–	Jippo	46	(2)
- * Club domestic league appearances and goals as of 23 November 2025

Roope Huhtala (born 21 June 2000) is a Finnish professional footballer who plays as a centre back for Ykkösliiga club Jippo.

== Club career ==
Huhtala debuted in Veikkausliiga with Ilves first team in 2017. In July 2019, he was loaned out to Tampereen Palloveikot (TPV) in second-tier Ykkönen.

On 28 January 2021, Huhtala moved to Lappeenranta after signing with PEPO.

On 3 February 2023, he signed with Käpylän Pallo (KäPa) in second-tier Ykkönen.

On 5 March 2024, Huhtala joined Ykkösliiga club Jippo.

== Personal life ==
His twin brother Jesse is also a professional footballer.

== Honours ==
Ilves

- Finnish Cup: 2019
