= Jesse Huhtala (footballer) =

Finnish footballer (born 2000)

Personal information
- Date of birth: 21 June 2000 (age 26)
- Place of birth: Tampere, Finland
- Height: 1.83 m (6 ft 0 in)
- Position: Forward

Team information
- Current team: Tampere United
- Number: 9

Youth career
- PJK
- Ilves

Senior career*
Years	Team	Apps	(Gls)
2018–2019	Ilves	2	(0)
2019	→ Ilves II	11	(7)
2019	→ PEPO (loan)	9	(5)
2020	HJS	15	(14)
2021–2022	Haka	2	(0)
2021	→ HJS (loan)	7	(3)
2022	PEPO	25	(3)
2023	SalPa	26	(10)
2024	AC Oulu	9	(0)
2024	OLS	5	(1)
2025–	Tampere United	46	(30)
Medal record
Ilves
First place	Finnish Cup	2019
- * Club domestic league appearances and goals as of 7 November 2026

Jesse Huhtala (born 21 June 2000) is a Finnish professional footballer who plays as a forward for Ykkönen club Tampere United.

His twin brother Roope Huhtala is also a professional football player for Ykkösliiga club JIPPO.

== Honours ==
Ilves

- Finnish Cup: 2019

Individual

- Ykkönen Player of the Month: April 2025
