= Felix Lehtinen =

Finnish footballer (born 2003)

Personal information
- Full name: Felix Alvar Olavi Lehtinen
- Date of birth: 19 July 2003 (age 23)
- Place of birth: Finland
- Height: 1.86 m (6 ft 1 in)
- Position: Goalkeeper

Team information
- Current team: Gudja United
- Number: 1

Youth career
- –2016: PJK
- 2016–2019: TPV
- 2020–2021: Ilves

Senior career*
Years	Team	Apps	(Gls)
2021	Ilves II	0	(0)
2022–2023	Haka II	14	(0)
2022–2023	Haka	0	(0)
2024–	Gudja United	3	(0)
- * Club domestic league appearances and goals as of 13 May 2024

Felix Alvar Olavi Lehtinen (born 19 July 2003) is a Finnish professional football player who plays as a goalkeeper for Maltese Premier League side Gudja United.

== Club career ==
Lehtinen played in the youth sectors of PJK, TPV and Ilves. He made his senior debut in 2022 with the reserve team of FC Haka, playing in fourth tier Kolmonen.

In January 2024, Lehtinen signed with Gudja United in Maltese Premier League for the rest of the season.

== Career statistics ==
As of 13 May 2024.

Appearances and goals by club, season and competition
Club	Season	League			National cup (Note: Includes Suomen Cup and Maltese FA Trophy)		Other		Total	
Club	Season	Division	Apps	Goals	Apps	Goals	Apps	Goals	Apps	Goals
Haka II	2022	Kolmonen	7	0	2	0	–		9	0
Haka II	2023	Kolmonen	7	0	0	0	–		7	0
Haka II	Total		14	0	2	0	0	0	16	0
Gudja United	2023–24	Maltese Premier League	3	0	1	0	0	0	4	0
Career total			17	0	3	0	0	0	20	0
