= Niklas Leinonen =

Finnish footballer (born 2003)

Personal information
- Date of birth: 14 February 2003 (age 23)
- Place of birth: Finland
- Height: 1.77 m (5 ft 10 in)
- Position: Central midfielder

Team information
- Current team: KäPa
- Number: 7

Youth career
- –2019: KTP

Senior career*
Years	Team	Apps	(Gls)
2019–2023	KTP	50	(1)
2019–2022	→ Peli-Karhut (loan)	18	(0)
2019	→ Sudet (loan)	13	(0)
2023	→ MP (loan)	10	(0)
2024	PK Keski-Uusimaa	26	(4)
2025–	Käpylän Pallo	42	(2)

International career
2019	Finland U16	2	(0)
2019	Finland U17	6	(0)
- * Club domestic league appearances and goals as of 20 October 2026

Niklas Leinonen (born 14 February 2003) is a Finnish professional footballer who plays as a central midfielder for Ykkösliiga club KäPa.
