= Kimpinen Sports Centre =

Athletics stadium in Lappeenranta, Finland

- Interactive map of Kimpinen Sports Centre
- Location: Kimpinen, Lappeenranta, Finland
- Coordinates: 61°03′46″N 28°11′55″E
- Owner: Lappeenranta
- Capacity: 4,900
- Field size: 100 m × 60 m (330 ft × 200 ft)

Construction
- Built: 1939
- Renovated: 2006-2007

Tenants
- PEPO, Rajaritarit

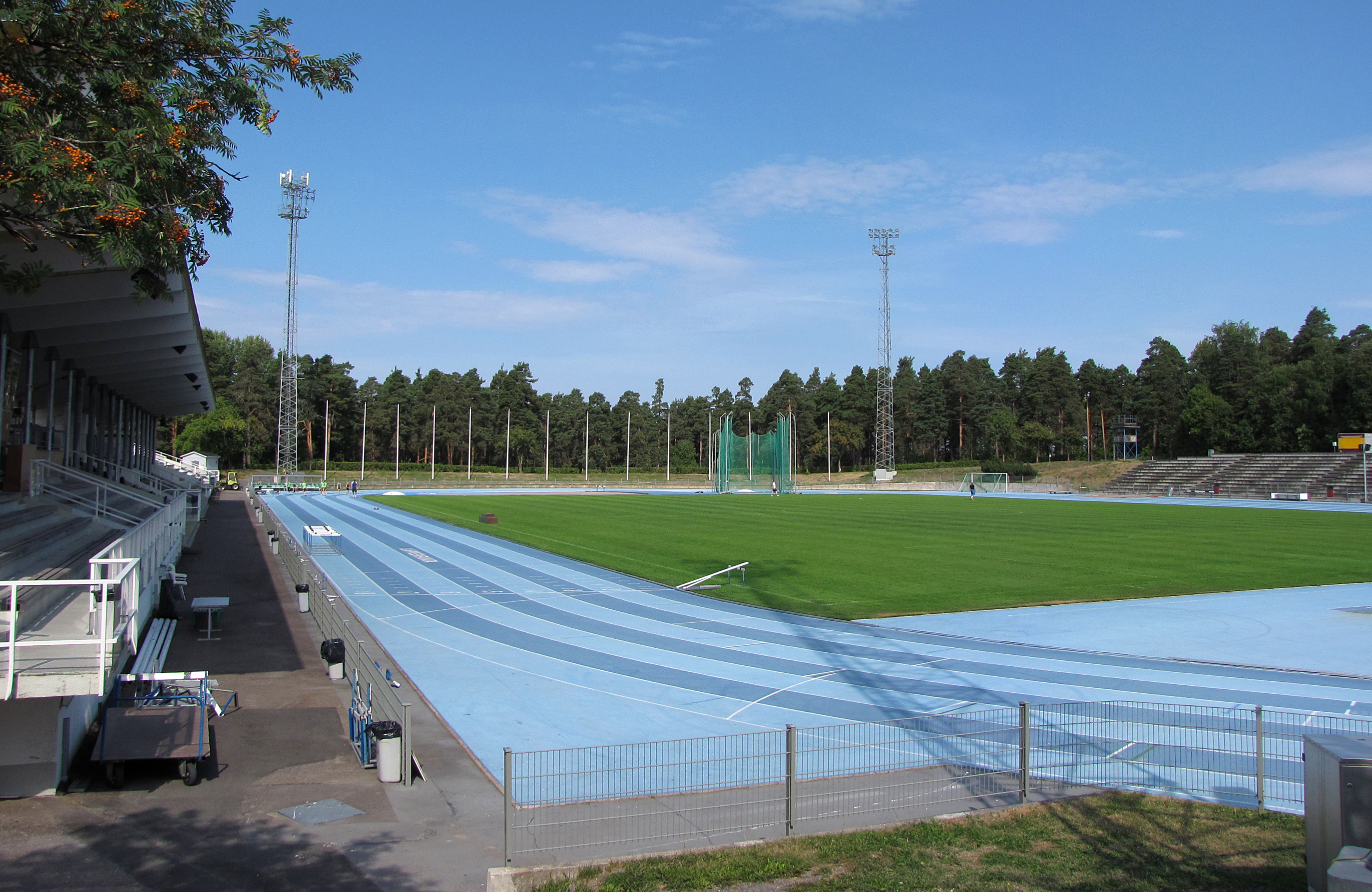
Kimpinen Sports Centre

Kimpinen Sports Centre (Finnish: Kimpisen urheilukeskus) is an athletics stadium in Lappeenranta, Finland. The stadium is used by, for example, PEPO football team, Rajaritarit American football team and Lappeenrannan Urheilu-Miehet athletics team.
