= Musa (Pori) =

Coordinates: 61°28′51″N 21°44′46″E

Musa Mossa
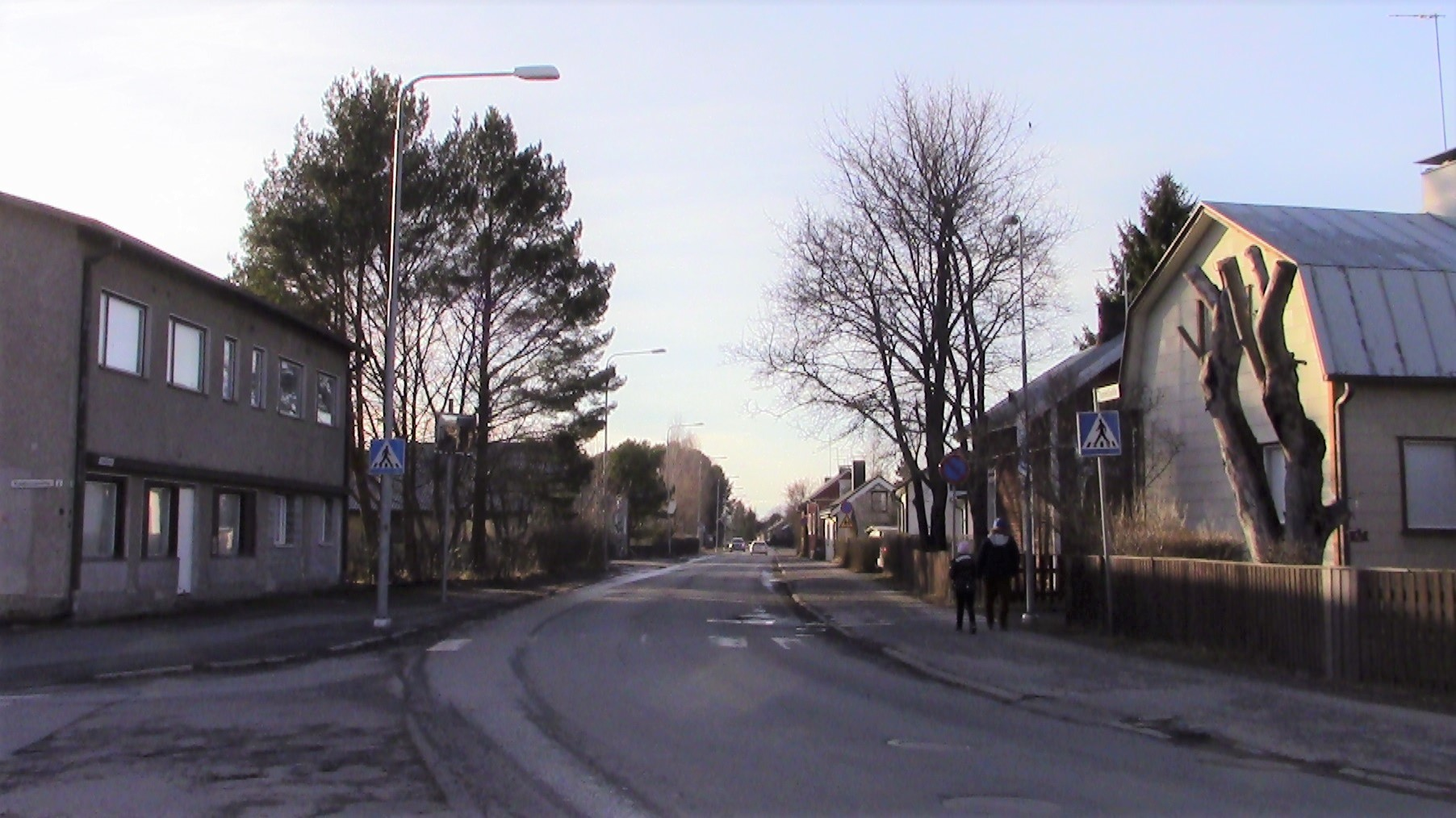
- Tommilantie street in Musa
- Interactive map of Musa

Population (2013)
  - Total: 1 014

Musa (Mossa in Swedish) is a city district of Pori, Finland. It is located in Western Pori and it borders the districts of Käppärä, Vähärauma, Liinaharja and Isomäki.

The district has a football ground known as the Musa Wembley that hosts the football club Musan Salama.

During World War II, German soldiers were stationed in Musa.
