= Maskun Palloseura =

Finnish football club

Masku
- Full name: Maskun Palloseura
- Founded: 1988; 38 years ago
- Ground: Taponkedon kenttä, Masku, Finland
- Capacity: 1000
- Chairman: Janne Lehtonen
- Manager: Pasi Läpinen / Jari Oksanen
- League: Kolmonen
- 2025: Kolmonen Länsi A, 4th of 12
Home colours

Maskun Palloseura (abbreviated Masku) is an association football club from Masku, Finland. The club was formed in 1988 and their home ground is Taponkedon kenttä. The men's first team currently plays in the Kolmonen (fifth tier in Finland).
