= Lasse Ikonen =

Finnish footballer (born 2003)

Personal information
- Date of birth: 19 January 2003 (age 23)
- Place of birth: Dallas, Texas
- Height: 1.75 m (5 ft 9 in)
- Position: Midfielder

Team information
- Current team: TPS
- Number: 26

Youth career
- –2019: OLS

Senior career*
Years	Team	Apps	(Gls)
2019–2023	OLS	49	(2)
2019–2023	AC Oulu	16	(0)
2022	→ Gnistan (loan)	21	(1)
2024–	TPS	67	(2)

International career^{‡}
2018–2019	Finland U16	9	(0)
2019	Finland U17	8	(0)
2021-2022	Finland U19	5	(0)
- * Club domestic league appearances and goals as of 13 November 2026 ‡ National team caps and goals as of 8 February 2024

Lasse Ikonen (born 19 January 2003) is a Finnish professional footballer who plays as a midfielder for Veikkausliiga club TPS.

== Early life ==
Ikonen was born in Dallas, Texas, to Finnish parents, and spent most of his childhood in Oulu, Finland. He has a dual citizenship of Finland and the United States.

== Club career ==
Ikonen played in the youth sector of Oulun Luistinseura (OLS). On 9 October 2019, Ikonen signed his first professional contract with his hometown club AC Oulu on a three-year deal. He made his Veikkausliiga debut with the club in the 2021 season. On 25 January 2022, his contract was extended, and he was loaned out to second-tier Ykkönen club Gnistan.

On 5 January 2024, after his contract expired with AC Oulu, Ikonen signed a multi-year deal with Turun Palloseura (TPS) in Ykkösliiga.

== International career ==
Ikonen has represented Finland at under-16, under-17 and under-19 youth international levels.

== Career statistics ==
As of 13 November 2026

Appearances and goals by club, season and competition
Club	Season	League			National cup (Note: Includes Suomen Cup)		League cup (Note: Includes Kakkonen Cup, Ykkönen Cup, Finnish League Cup and Ykkösliigacup)		Continental		Total	
Club	Season	Division	Apps	Goals	Apps	Goals	Apps	Goals	Apps	Goals	Apps	Goals
OLS	2019	Kakkonen	4	0	–		–		–		4	0
OLS	2020	Kakkonen	11	0	–		–		–		11	0
OLS	2021	Kakkonen	20	2	0	0	2	0	–		22	2
OLS	2022	Kakkonen	0	0	0	0	–		–		0	0
OLS	2023	Kakkonen	13	0	–		–		–		13	0
OLS	Total		48	2	0	0	2	0	0	0	50	2
AC Oulu	2019	Ykkönen	4	0	0	0	–		–		4	0
AC Oulu	2020	Ykkönen	3	0	1	0	–		–		4	0
AC Oulu	2021	Veikkausliiga	5	0	0	0	–		–		5	0
AC Oulu	2022	Veikkausliiga	0	0	0	0	0	0	–		0	0
AC Oulu	2023	Veikkausliiga	4	0	1	0	4	0	–		9	0
AC Oulu	Total		16	0	2	0	4	0	0	0	22	0
Gnistan (loan)	2022	Ykkönen	21	1	2	0	3	0	–		26	2
TPS	2024	Ykkösliiga	19	0	4	1	4	0	–		27	1
TPS	2025	Ykkösliiga	24	1	2	1	5	0	–		31	2
TPS	2026	Veikkausliiga	24	1	4	0	5	0	–		33	1
TPS	Total		67	2	10	2	14	0	0	0	91	4
Career total			152	5	14	2	23	0	0	0	189	7

== Honours ==
AC Oulu

- Finnish League Cup runner-up: 2023

OLS

- Kakkonen, Group C: 2023
