= Union Plaani =

Football club in Heinola, Finland

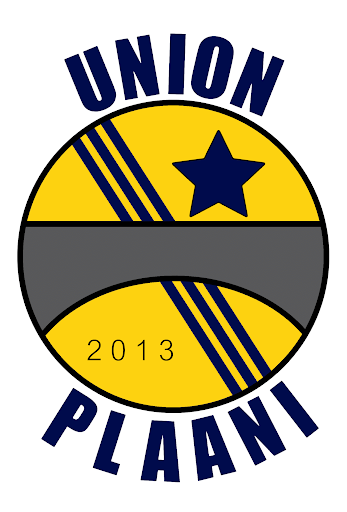
- Full name: Union Plaani
- Founded: 2013
- Ground: Heinolan Urheilupuisto, Heinola
- Chairman: Antti Heikkinen
- Manager: Olli Tynkkynen
- League: Kakkonen
- 2026: Kakkonen Group A, 8th of 10
- Website: https://unionplaani.com/

Union Plaani is a football club located in Heinola, Finland. It currently plays in the Finnish Second Division Kakkonen.

== History ==
Union Plaani was founded in 2013.

== Colours ==
Union Plaani's colours are yellow and navy blue.

== Stadium ==
Union Plaani plays their home matches on Heinolan Urheilupuisto located in Plaani, Heinola.

== Season to season ==
Season	Level	Division	Section	Administration	Position	Movements
2014	Tier 7	Kutonen (Sixth Division)	South-East Finland Group	Southeast Finland (SPL Kaakkois-Suomi)	1st	Promoted
2015	Tier 6	Vitonen (Fifth Division)	South-East Finland Western Group	Southeast Finland (SPL Kaakkois-Suomi)	1st	Promoted
2016	Tier 5	Nelonen (Fourth Division)	South-East Finland Group	Southeast Finland (SPL Kaakkois-Suomi)	5th	
2017	Tier 5	Nelonen (Fourth Division)	South-East Finland Group	Southeast Finland (SPL Kaakkois-Suomi)	1st	Promoted
2018	Tier 4	Kolmonen (Third Division)	South-East Finland Group	Southeast Finland (SPL Kaakkois-Suomi)	11th	
2019	Tier 4	Kolmonen (Third Division)	South-East Finland Group	Southeast Finland (SPL Kaakkois-Suomi)	10th	
2020	Tier 4	Kolmonen (Third Division)	Eastern Finland Group B	Finnish FA (Suomen Palloliitto)	7th	
2021	Tier 4	Kolmonen (Third Division)	Eastern Finland Group B	Finnish FA (Suomen Palloliitto)	6th	
2022	Tier 4	Kolmonen (Third Division)	Eastern Finland Group B	Finnish FA (Suomen Palloliitto)	8th	
2023	Tier 4	Kolmonen (Third Division)	Eastern Finland Group B	Finnish FA (Suomen Palloliitto)	4th	
2024	Tier 5*	Kolmonen (Second Division)	Eastern Finland Group B	Finnish FA (Suomen Palloliitto)	2nd	
2025	Tier 5	Kolmonen (Second Division)	Eastern Finland Group B	Finnish FA (Suomen Palloliitto)	1st	Promoted
2026	Tier 4	Kakkonen (Second Division)	Group A	Finnish FA (Suomen Palloliitto)		

*Kolmonen switched from tier 4 to tier 5 after the adaptation of Ykkösliiga as the new tier 2 division.

- 7 seasons in fourth tier \ Kakkonen, Kolmonen
- 4 seasons in fifth tier \ Kolmonen, Nelonen
- 1 season in sixth tier \ Vitonen
- 1 season1 in seventh tier \ Kutonen

== Current squad ==
As of 21 April 2026

Note: Flags indicate national team as defined under FIFA eligibility rules; some limited exceptions apply. Players may hold more than one non-FIFA nationality.

No.	Pos.	Nation	Player
1	GK	FIN	Riku Tirronen
2	FW	FIN	Lauri Ala-Kauhaluoma
3	MF	FIN	Antti Solonen
4	DF	FIN	Johannes Karjalainen
5	MF	FIN	Julius Utriainen
6	DF	FIN	Rene Bister
7	FW	FIN	Lirinis Haziri
8	MF	FIN	Johannes Korhonen
9	MF	FIN	Niklas Kivistö
10	MF	FIN	Santeri Harjula
11	FW	FIN	Nicola Kuokkanen
12	GK	MAR	Youssef Belabid
14	DF	FIN	Ville Kurki
17	DF	FIN	Teemu Kettunen
18	MF	FIN	Simo Paakkanen
19	FW	FIN	Tymoteusz Kuzniarek

No.	Pos.	Nation	Player
20	FW	FIN	Noa Ahlfors
21	FW	FIN	Marko Kaukonen
22	MF	FIN	Aleksi Huttunen
23	FW	FIN	Mascuud Hassan
24	DF	FIN	Pyry Virtanen
25	MF	FIN	Loorents Hertsi
26	FW	BIH	Amar Serdarević
27	MF	FIN	Eetu Vahekoski
28	FW	FIN	Aapo Nykänen
33	MF	FIN	Janne Hahl
34	MF	FIN	Besjan Hasani
44	DF	CMR	Victor Emmanuel Afila Bodo
71	MF	FIN	Jari Mulari
84	DF	FIN	Roope Lahti
88	DF	BRA	David Silva Nunes
—	MF	FIN	Kyösti Heikkinen
