= Etelä-Espoon Pallo =

Finnish football club

- Full name: Etelä-Espoon Pallo
- Nickname(s): EsPa
- Founded: 1988; 37 years ago
- Ground: Matinkylän tekonurmi 1 Espoo; Finland
- Capacity: 200
- Chairman: Jussi Mononen
- Manager: Tuukka Uimonen
- League: Kolmonen
- 2021: Kolmonen – Helsinki & Uusimaa, Section A
Home colours	Away colours

Etelä-Espoon Pallo, or EsPa as the name is commonly abbreviated, is a Finnish amateur football club from the city of Espoo. The club was founded in 1988 and currently competes in the Kolmonen, the fourth tier of the Finnish football league system. EsPa's second adult team compete in the Vitonen. EsPa play their home matches at Matinkylä.

EsPa has two adult teams and twelve junior teams and in total has around 750 registered players. The club was founded to replace Matinkylän Mahti's football section.

Etelä-Espoon Pallo operates in Matinkylä and Olari parts of Espoo. The club organises the annual EsPa Iso Omena (Big Apple) Tournament.

== History ==
In 2009 EsPa finished in 4th position in Section 2 of the Kolmonen and the next season finished in second place in Section 1 (Lohko 1) of the Kolmonen administered by the Uusimaa SPL, the fourth highest tier in the Finnish football system.

The 2011 season proved to be the best in EsPa's history. The first team secured promoted to the Kakkonen after finishing in second place of the Kolmonen. After finishing second, EsPa were included in the promotion play-offs as the best second placed team of all seven sections of Finland. EsPa were paired with Pallokerho Keski-Uusimaa. The first leg took place in Matinkylä with EsPa winning 3–1. The second leg proved to be a dramatic affair with EsPa controversially being reduced to ten men after five minutes. The match eventually ended 2–1 in PKKU's favour, however EsPa progressed, winning 4–3 on aggregate.

In the same season, EsPa's second team, in their first season, were crowned champions of the 6th Division section 2 and played in the 5th Division during 2012.

In 2012, EsPa started its first-ever season in Kakkonen (Finnish 3rd Tier) with general opinion being that they were unlikely to survive in what was thought to be the toughest Kakkonen section, Eteläinen (Southern) without signing a significant number of new players. However, after the first ten games Yellow-Greens had 16 points. In these matches EsPa were able to regularly field their best team, but then in mid season the club's best forward pairing, Masar Ömer and Joonas Vilkki, were injured. Ömer was out rest of the season, though Vilkki was able to return for last couple of games. Season 2012 culminated in the last two home games.

First a 2–0 win from local competitor FC Espoo, in a game where EsPa's goalkeeper Törnqvist produced a large number of saves, including a penalty kick. This made the crucial three-point difference in EsPa's benefit between these two teams fighting head to head against relegation. If these teams would end in same points, the goal difference would determine relegating team.

The last game of the season against section winner ÅIFK would set the series level for next season. With win or draw EsPa was going to continue on Kakkonen. If they lost the game, FC Espoo's last game against GrIFK would determine which team, EsPa or FC Espoo, would remain in the division. In spite of the pressure EsPa won 2–0, with Törnqvist again saving a penalty kick. With this win EsPa ensured that they keep on playing in Kakkonen also in season 2013.

== Season to season ==
Season	Level	Division	Section	Administration	Position	Movements
2000	Tier 4	Kolmonen (Third Division)	Section 1	Helsinki & Uusimaa (SPL Helsinki)	11th	Relegated
2001	Tier 5	Nelonen (Fourth Division)	Section 1	Uusimaa District (SPL Uusimaa)	2nd	Promoted
2002	Tier 4	Kolmonen (Third Division)	Section 1	Helsinki & Uusimaa (SPL Uusimaa)	10th	
2003	Tier 4	Kolmonen (Third Division)	Section 1	Helsinki & Uusimaa (SPL Uusimaa)	11th	Relegated
2004	Tier 5	Nelonen (Fourth Division)	Section 1	Uusimaa District (SPL Uusimaa)	7th	
2005	Tier 5	Nelonen (Fourth Division)	Section 1	Uusimaa District (SPL Uusimaa)	9th	
2006	Tier 5	Nelonen (Fourth Division)	Section 1	Uusimaa District (SPL Uusimaa)	3rd	Promoted
2007	Tier 4	Kolmonen (Third Division)	Section 1	Helsinki & Uusimaa (SPL Uusimaa)	6th	
2008	Tier 4	Kolmonen (Third Division)	Section 1	Helsinki & Uusimaa (SPL Uusimaa)	7th	
2009	Tier 4	Kolmonen (Third Division)	Section 2	Helsinki & Uusimaa (SPL Helsinki)	4th	
2010	Tier 4	Kolmonen (Third Division)	Section 1	Helsinki & Uusimaa (SPL Uusimaa)	2nd	
2011	Tier 4	Kolmonen (Third Division)	Section 1	Helsinki & Uusimaa (SPL Uusimaa)	2nd	Promoted
2012	Tier 3	Kakkonen (Second Division)	Eteläinen (Southern)	Finnish FA (Suomen Pallolitto)	8th	
2013	Tier 3	Kakkonen (Second Division)	Eteläinen (Southern)	Finnish FA (Suomen Pallolitto)	9th	Relegated
2014	Tier 4	Kolmonen (Third Division)	Section 1	Helsinki & Uusimaa (SPL Uusimaa)	3rd	
2015	Tier 4	Kolmonen (Third Division)	Section 2	Helsinki & Uusimaa (SPL Uusimaa)	1st	Promoted
2016	Tier 3	Kakkonen (Second Division)	Section B	Finnish FA (Suomen Pallolitto)		
2017	Tier 3	Kakkonen (Second Division)	Section B	Finnish FA (Suomen Pallolitto)		

- 4 seasons in Kakkonen
- 10 seasons in Kolmonen
- 4 seasons in Nelonen

== References and sources ==
- Official Website
- Finnish Wikipedia
- Suomen Cup
