= Vilmer Rönnberg =

Swedish association football player

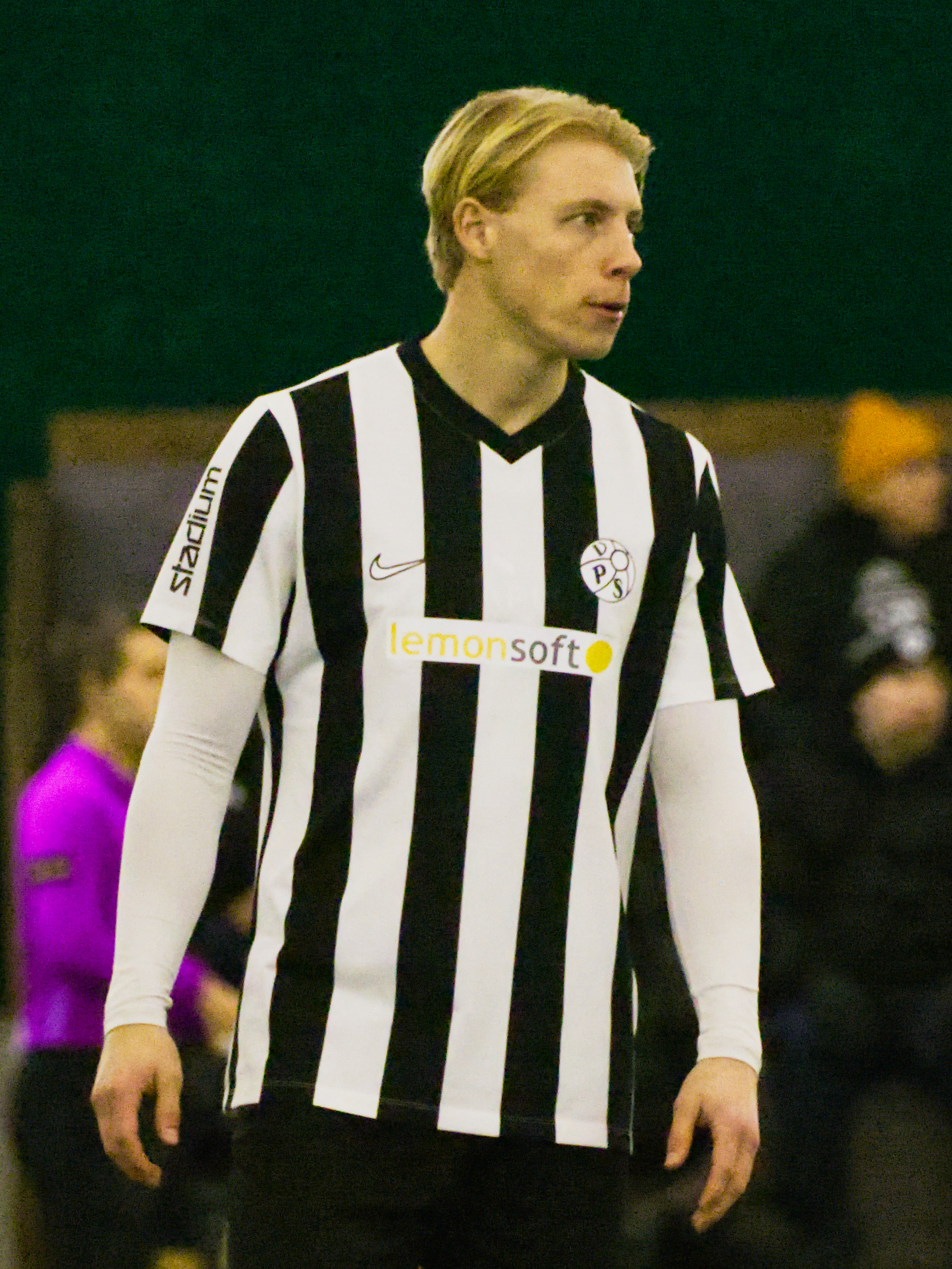
- Rönnberg with VPS in 2026

Personal information
- Full name: Vilmer Johannes Rönnberg
- Date of birth: 28 March 2002 (age 24)
- Place of birth: Sweden
- Height: 1.93 m (6 ft 4 in)
- Position: Central defender

Team information
- Current team: VPS
- Number: 5

Youth career
- 2008–2019: Enskede IK
- 2019–2021: Hammarby

Senior career*
Years	Team	Apps	(Gls)
2018–2019	Enskede IK	9	(0)
2022	Hammarby TFF	16	(0)
2023	Varberg	16	(0)
2024	B36 Tórshavn	21	(2)
2025–	VPS	21	(1)
- * Club domestic league appearances and goals as of 24 July 2026

Vilmer Rönnberg (born 28 March 2002) is a Swedish professional footballer who plays in the Veikkausliiga for VPS as a central defender. He has previously played for Varberg in the Swedish top tier, Allsvenskan, and for Hammarby TFF in Ettan, the Swedish third tier.

== Career ==
Rönnberg spent his youth career in Enskede IK, where he had his debut on the first team as 16 years old, playing in Division 2 which is the fourth tier of Swedish football. He gained a contract with the youth academy of Hammarby, where he played on the U17 and U19 teams until the end of 2021. He then moved to Hammarby's talent team, where he played for one season. He was not able to gain a professional contract with Hammarby, but instead Varberg offered him a contract. He played a full season for them in Allsvenskan, which is the top tier of Swedish football. After Varberg was relegated, they had a new manager who made a lot of changes in the squad. Rönnberg decided to push his luck, and try something different. Thus he joined the Faroese top club B36 Tórshavn, who is a regular participant in European club competitions.

On 6 November 2024, Rönnberg signed with Finnish Veikkausliiga club Vaasan Palloseura (VPS) on a two-year deal with a one-year option.

== Career statistics ==
As of 22 May 2025

Appearances and goals by club, season and competition
Club	Season	League			National cup (Note: Includes Svenska Cupen, Faroe Islands Cup and Suomen Cup)		League cup (Note: Includes Finnish League Cup)		Europe		Total	
Club	Season	Division	Apps	Goals	Apps	Goals	Apps	Goals	Apps	Goals	Apps	Goals
Enskede IK	2018	Swedish Division 2	1	0	–		–		–		1	0
Enskede IK	2019	Swedish Division 2	8	0	–		–		–		8	0
Enskede IK	Total		9	0	0	0	0	0	0	0	9	0
Hammarby TFF	2022	Ettan	16	0	–		–		–		16	0
Varbergs BoIS	2023	Allsvenskan	13	0	3	0	–		–		16	0
B36 Tórshavn	2024	Faroe Islands Premier League	21	2	2	0	–		2 (Note: Appearances in UEFA Conference League)	0	25	2
VPS	2025	Veikkausliiga	4	0	2	1	1	0	–		7	1
Career total			63	2	7	1	1	0	2	0	73	3
