= Musan kenttä =

Football ground in Pori, Finland

- Musa Wembley
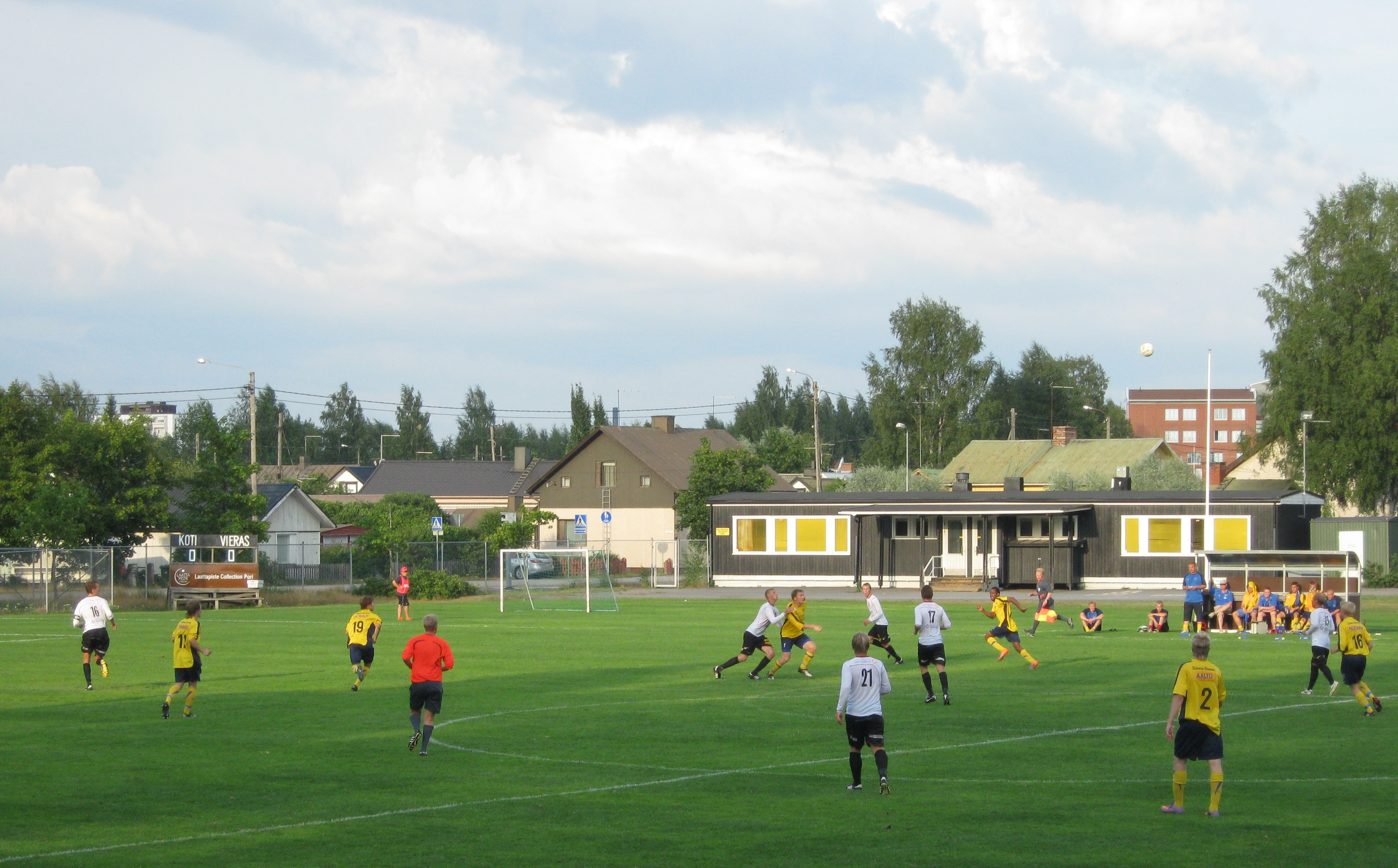
- Address: Tommilantie 18-20; Pori; Finland
- Capacity: 700
- Record attendance: 2 136 (MuSa vs GBK), 2018 Ykkönen promotion play-offs

Construction
- Opened: 1960
- Renovated: 1977

Tenants
- Musan Salama (1960–2019, 2022–present)

Musan kenttä (Musa Ground in English, also known as the Musa Wembley) is an association football ground located in the Musa district of Pori, Finland. The ground is used by football club Musan Salama. The ground has a capacity of 700 of which 500 are seats.

== History ==
The Musan kenttä was built in 1960. It used to be frozen during the winter when the ice hockey section of the Musan Salama was active.

The record attendance was made on 13 October 2018 in a match between Musan Salama and GBK when 2 136 spectators were watching MuSa get promoted to the 2nd tier. The previous record was made on 8 June 2018 with 2 049 spectators in a Pori Derby match between MuSa and FC Jazz.

In 2019, the Finnish Football Association deemed the Musan kenttä too dangerous for players and fans and forced MuSa to play in the bigger Pori Stadium. As of June 2023, the city of Pori is planning on expanding and improving the football ground.
