= Musan Salama =

Finnish football club

- Nickname: Valkoiset Tiikerit (The White Tigers)
- Founded: April 10, 1960; 66 years ago
- Ground: Musan kenttä
- Capacity: 700
- Sporting director: Kari Löytökorpi
- Head coach: Aki Pietikäinen
- League: Kakkonen
- 2026: Kakkonen Group B, 8th of 10
- Website: https://musansalama.fi/
Home colours	Away colours

Musan Salama (lit. 'The Lightning Bolt of Musa'), commonly abbreviated MuSa, is a football club based in Pori, Finland, playing in the Finnish fifth tier Kolmonen as of the 2024 season. It was founded in 1960 in the Musa suburb of Pori as a football and ice hockey club. The ice hockey section was continued by the Porin Kiekko-Salamat after 1972.

MuSa is a member of the Finnish Workers' Sports Federation. The club is nicknamed Valkoiset Tiikerit (White Tigers in English).

== History ==
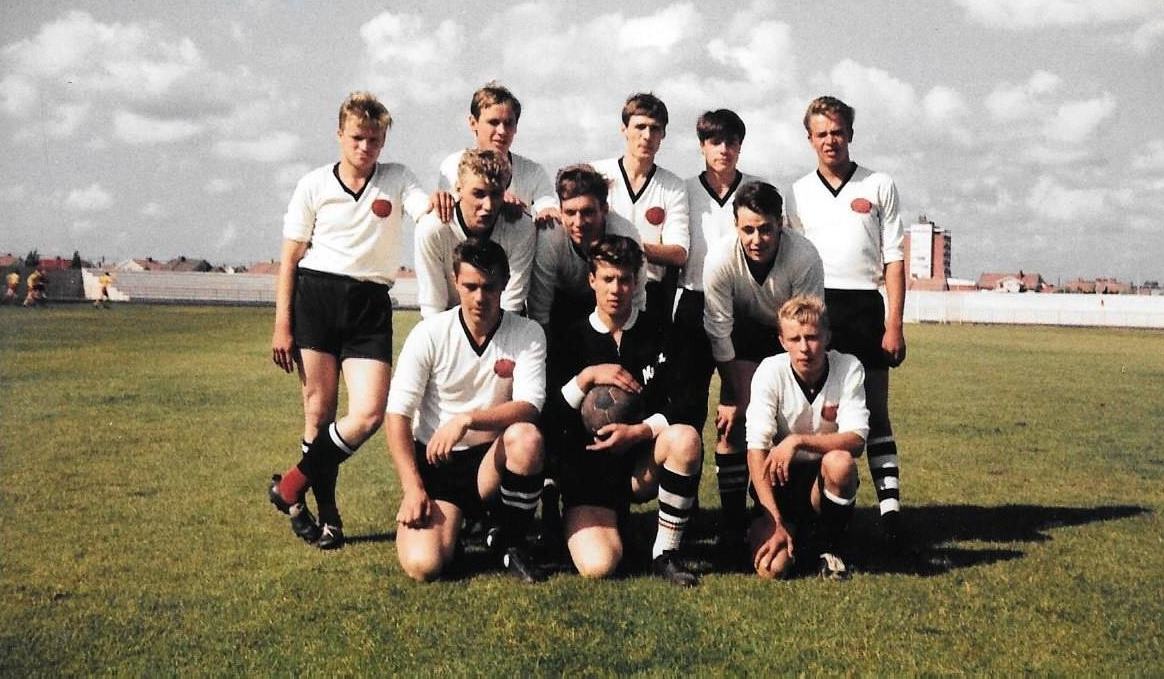
Musan Salama squad in 1969

MuSa women's football team played in the premier division SM-sarja from 1981 to 1985. The women's futsal team are two time Finnish Champions.

Musan Salama has mostly played in the Finnish third or fourth levels. In 1999–2001 MuSa made a three-year spell to the second tier Ykkönen, but was relegated after the 2001 season. In 2016 MuSa made it to the promotion play-offs losing to the Helsinki side Gnistan on penalties. Finally, in 2018 MuSa achieved promotion back to the second tier Ykkönen by defeating Kokkola based side GBK in the finals of the promotion playoffs on penalties.

== Season to season Men's team ==
Season to Season

Season	Level	Division	Section	Administration	Position	Movements
1964	Tier 4	Aluesarja (Fourth Division)	Group 6 Satakunta	Finnish FA (Suomen Pallolitto)	1st	Promoted
1965	Tier 3	Maakuntasarja (Third Division)	Group 4 Tampere & Satakunta	Finnish FA (Suomen Pallolitto)	4th	
1966	Tier 3	Maakuntasarja (Third Division)	Group 5 Tampere & Satakunta	Finnish FA (Suomen Pallolitto)	5th	
1967	Tier 3	Maakuntasarja (Third Division)	Group 4 Tampere & Satakunta	Finnish FA (Suomen Pallolitto)	7th	Relegated
1968	Tier 4	Aluesarja (Fourth Division)	Group 6 Satakunta	Finnish FA (Suomen Pallolitto)	3rd	
1969	Tier 4	Aluesarja (Fourth Division)	Group 6 Satakunta	Finnish FA (Suomen Pallolitto)	3rd	
1970	Tier 4	4. divisioona (Fourth Division)	Group 6 Satakunta	Finnish FA (Suomen Pallolitto)	1st	Promoted
1971	Tier 3	3. divisioona (Third Division)	Group 3 Satakunta & Tampere	Finnish FA (Suomen Pallolitto)	1st	Promoted
1972	Tier 2	2. divisioona (Second Division)	West Group	Finnish FA (Suomen Pallolitto)	7th	
1973	Tier 3	2. divisioona (Second Division)	West Group	Finnish FA (Suomen Pallolitto)	9th	
1974	Tier 3	2. divisioona (Second Division)	West Group	Finnish FA (Suomen Pallolitto)	3rd	
1975	Tier 3	2. divisioona (Second Division)	West Group	Finnish FA (Suomen Pallolitto)	1st	Promoted
1976	Tier 2	1. divisioona (First Division)		Finnish FA (Suomen Pallolitto)	10th	Relegated
1977	Tier 3	2. divisioona (Second Division)	West Group	Finnish FA (Suomen Pallolitto)	2nd	
1978	Tier 3	2. divisioona (Second Division)	West Group	Finnish FA (Suomen Pallolitto)	10th	Relegated
1979	Tier 4	3. divisioona (Third Division)	Group 4	Finnish FA (Suomen Pallolitto)	7th	
1980	Tier 4	3. divisioona (Third Division)	Group 4	Finnish FA (Suomen Pallolitto)	3rd	
1981	Tier 4	3. divisioona (Third Division)	Group 4	Finnish FA (Suomen Pallolitto)	4th	
1982	Tier 4	3. divisioona (Third Division)	Group 4	Finnish FA (Suomen Pallolitto)	2nd	Promotion Playoff
1983	Tier 4	3. divisioona (Third Division)	Group 4	Finnish FA (Suomen Pallolitto)	1st	Promotion Playoff - Promoted
1984	Tier 3	2. divisioona (Second Division)	West Group	Finnish FA (Suomen Pallolitto)	11th	Relegated
1985	Tier 4	3. divisioona (Third Division)	Group 4	Finnish FA (Suomen Pallolitto)	4th	
1986	Tier 4	3. divisioona (Third Division)	Group 4	Finnish FA (Suomen Pallolitto)	1st	Promoted
1987	Tier 3	2. divisioona (Second Division)	West Group	Finnish FA (Suomen Pallolitto)	6th	
1988	Tier 3	2. divisioona (Second Division)	West Group	Finnish FA (Suomen Pallolitto)	8th	
1989	Tier 3	2. divisioona (Second Division)	West Group	Finnish FA (Suomen Pallolitto)	12th	Relegated
1990	Tier 4	3. divisioona (Third Division)	Group 4	Finnish FA (Suomen Pallolitto)	3rd	
1991	Tier 4	3. divisioona (Third Division)	Group 4	Finnish FA (Suomen Pallolitto)	3rd	
1992	Tier 4	3. divisioona (Third Division)	Group 4	Finnish FA (Suomen Pallolitto)	2nd	
1993	Tier 4	Kolmonen (Third Division)	Group 4	Finnish FA (Suomen Pallolitto)	3rd	Promotion Playoff
1994	Tier 4	Kolmonen (Third Division)	Group 4	Finnish FA (Suomen Pallolitto)	2nd	Promotion Playoff - Promoted
1995	Tier 3	Kakkonen (Second Division)	West Group	Finnish FA (Suomen Pallolitto)	10th	Relegated
1996	Tier 4	Kolmonen (Third Division)	Group 4	Finnish FA (Suomen Pallolitto)	1st	Promoted
1997	Tier 3	Kakkonen (Second Division)	West Group	Finnish FA (Suomen Pallolitto)	3rd	
1998	Tier 3	Kakkonen (Second Division)	West Group	Finnish FA (Suomen Pallolitto)	1st	Promoted
1999	Tier 2	Ykkönen (First Division)		Finnish FA (Suomen Pallolitto)	8th	
2000	Tier 2	Ykkönen (First Division)		Finnish FA (Suomen Pallolitto)	9th	
2001	Tier 2	Ykkönen (First Division)	North Group	Finnish FA (Suomen Pallolitto)	10th	Relegated
2002	Tier 3	Kakkonen (Second Division)	West Group	Finnish FA (Suomen Pallolitto)	7th	
2003	Tier 3	Kakkonen (Second Division)	West Group	Finnish FA (Suomen Pallolitto)	7th	
2004	Tier 3	Kakkonen (Second Division)	Western Group	Finnish FA (Suomen Pallolitto)	7th	
2005	Tier 3	Kakkonen (Second Division)	Western Group	Finnish FA (Suomen Pallolitto)	12th	Relegated
2006	Tier 4	Kolmonen (Third Division)	Satakunta	Finnish FA (Suomen Pallolitto)	1st	Promotion Group 2nd - Promoted
2007	Tier 3	Kakkonen (Second Division)	Group B	Finnish FA (Suomen Pallolitto)	13th	Relegated
2008	Tier 4	Kolmonen (Third Division)	Satakunta	Finnish FA (Suomen Pallolitto)	2nd	
2009	Tier 4	Kolmonen (Third Division)	Satakunta	Finnish FA (Suomen Pallolitto)	1st	Promoted
2010	Tier 3	Kakkonen (Second Division)	Group B	Finnish FA (Suomen Pallolitto)	9th	
2011	Tier 3	Kakkonen (Second Division)	Group B	Finnish FA (Suomen Pallolitto)	13th	Relegated
2012	Tier 4	Kolmonen (Third Division)	Tampere & Satakunta	Finnish FA (Suomen Pallolitto)	1st	Promoted
2013	Tier 3	Kakkonen (Second Division)	Western Group	Finnish FA (Suomen Pallolitto)	9th	Relegated
2014	Tier 4	Kolmonen (Third Division)	Tampere & Satakunta	Finnish FA (Suomen Pallolitto)	1st	Promoted
2015	Tier 3	Kakkonen (Second Division)	Western Group	Finnish FA (Suomen Pallolitto)	2nd	
2016	Tier 3	Kakkonen (Second Division)	Group C	Finnish FA (Suomen Pallolitto)	2nd	Promotion Playoff
2017	Tier 3	Kakkonen (Second Division)	Group B	Finnish FA (Suomen Pallolitto)	2nd	
2018	Tier 3	Kakkonen (Second Division)	Group B	Finnish FA (Suomen Pallolitto)	1st	Promotion Playoff - Promoted
2019	Tier 2	Ykkönen (First Division)		Finnish FA (Suomen Pallolitto)	5th	
2020	Tier 2	Ykkönen (First Division)		Finnish FA (Suomen Pallolitto)	5th	
2021	Tier 2	Ykkönen (First Division)		Finnish FA (Suomen Pallolitto)	11th	Relegated
2022	Tier 3	Kakkonen (Second Division)	Group B	Finnish FA (Suomen Pallolitto)	11th	Relegated
2023	Tier 4	Kolmonen (Third Division)	Western Group A	Finnish FA (Suomen Pallolitto)	3rd	
2024	Tier 5	Kolmonen (Third Division)	Western Group A	Finnish FA (Suomen Pallolitto)	1st	Promoted

- 8 seasons in 2nd Tier
- 29 seasons in 3rd Tier
- 23 seasons in 4th Tier
- 1 season in 5th Tier

- 2000 Ykkönen – 9th
- 2001 Ykkönen – 10th (relegated)
- 2002 Kakkonen – 7th
- 2003 Kakkonen – 7th
- 2004 Kakkonen – 7th
- 2005 Kakkonen – 12th (relegated)
- 2006 Kolmonen – 1st (promoted)
- 2007 Kakkonen – 13th (relegated)
- 2008 Kolmonen – 2nd
- 2009 Kolmonen – 1st (promoted)
- 2010 Kakkonen – 9th
- 2011 Kakkonen – 13th (relegated)
- 2012 Kolmonen – 1st (promoted)
- 2013 Kakkonen – 9th (relegated)
- 2014 Kolmonen – 1st (promoted)
- 2015 Kakkonen – 2nd
- 2016 Kakkonen – 2nd (promotion play-offs)
- 2017 Kakkonen – 2nd
- 2018 Kakkonen - 1st (promoted via Playoffs)
- 2019 Ykkönen – 5th
- 2020 Ykkönen – 5th
- 2021 Ykkönen – 11th (relegated)
- 2022 Kakkonen – 11th (relegated)
- 2023 Kolmonen – 3rd

== Rivalries ==
Musan Salama's main rival is considered to be the FC Jazz Pori. The games between MuSa and Jazz are known as the Pori Derby.

== Current squad ==
As of 14 June 2024. Note: Flags indicate national team as defined under FIFA eligibility rules; some limited exceptions apply. Players may hold more than one non-FIFA nationality.

No.	Pos.	Nation	Player
1	GK	FIN	Jaakko Lakkamäki
3	DF	FIN	Iivari Kaipiainen
4	FW	FIN	Konsta-Kalevi Puustinen
6	DF	FIN	Jussi Välilä (captain)
8	MF	NGR	Ejiro Elijah Simeon
9	FW	FIN	Samuel Laitinen
10	MF	NGR	Abdulqoyum Idowu Akinpelu
11	MF	FIN	Eemil Hietava
15	DF	NGR	Oluwafemi Abiodun Adeleke
16	DF	FIN	Juuso Marttila
18	FW	FIN	Valtteri Männistö
19	MF	FIN	Elias Isoviita

No.	Pos.	Nation	Player
20	MF	NGR	Abass Aderemi Adewoyin
21	MF	FIN	Mico Mpho Heinilä
23	DF	FIN	Toni Storberg
25	MF	FIN	Elmeri Luoma
26	DF	FIN	Olli Auranen
30	DF	FIN	Miiro Tähkänen
31	FW	FIN	Samuil Georgiev
35	FW	FIN	Niilo Mäkelä
40	MF	FIN	Alex Santos
47	FW	FIN	Oliver Meronen
55	FW	NGR	John Agunsoye

== Academy and juniors ==
Musan Salama and Toejoen Veikot have formed two youth academy teams for ages U20 and U17 called the Pori Akatemia.

Former EFL Championship, Veikkausliiga and Finnish national team player Sampsa Timoska played for MuSa as a junior.

NHL ice hockey players Jesse Joensuu and Joel Armia have both played for MuSa's junior teams.

== See also ==
- Porin Kiekko-Salamat
- Musan kenttä
