= Vähärauma =

District of the city of Pori, Finland

Coordinates: 61°29′13″N 21°44′07″E

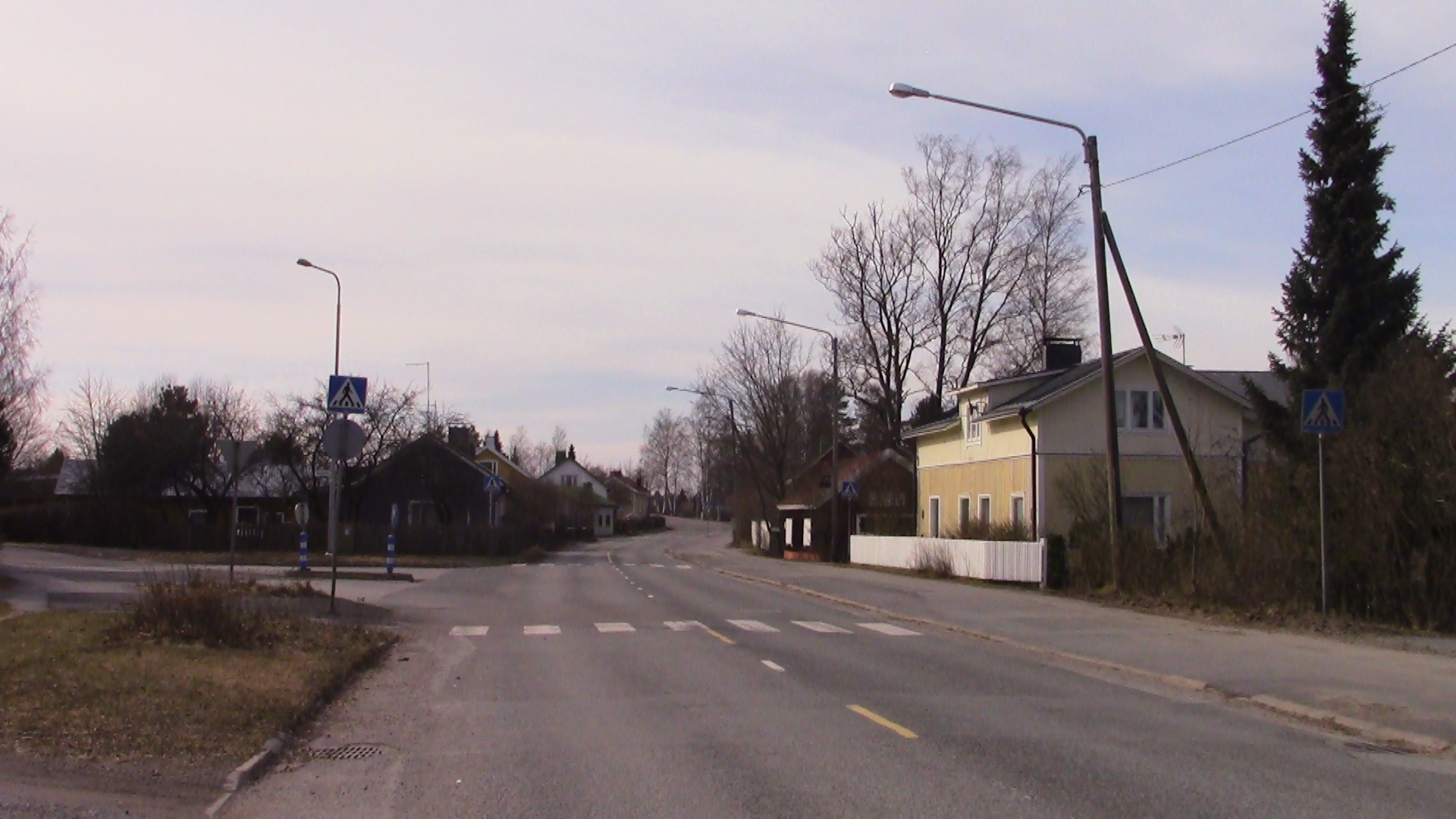
Vähäraumantie seen from Noukantie crossing in Vähärauma.

Vähärauma (Swedish: Lillraumo) is the 25th district of Pori (Swedish: Björneborg), the 10th largest city of Finland. It is in the west of the city, south of the river.

Vähärauma district is one of the largest districts in Pori. Its population was 2,717 in 2013. The area's name means "rising sea bay", and it was once an area from which water gradually escaped.

The area holds two schools and a public library, a secondary vocational institution, WinNova, and third level academic buildings.
