= Urho Huhtamäki =

Finnish footballer (born 2004)

Personal information
- Full name: Urho Oskari Huhtamäki
- Date of birth: 18 April 2004 (age 22)
- Place of birth: Finland
- Position: Defender

Team information
- Current team: Käpylän Pallo
- Number: 2

Youth career
- –2021: Käpylän Pallo

Senior career*
Years	Team	Apps	(Gls)
2021	Käpylän Pallo	10	(0)
2022–2023	Honka II	36	(0)
2024–2025	KTP	15	(0)
2025	→ Peli-Karhut (loan)	3	(0)
2025–	Käpylän Pallo	33	(0)

International career
2019	Finland U16	2	(0)
2021	Finland U18	4	(0)
2022	Finland U19	2	(0)
- * Club domestic league appearances and goals as of 20 October 2026

Urho Oskari Huhtamäki (born 18 April 2004) is a Finnish professional footballer who plays as a defender for Käpylän Pallo.

== Honours ==
KTP

- Ykkösliiga: 2024
