= Käpylän Pallo =

Finnish football club

KäPa
- Full name: Käpylän Pallo
- Founded: 1956; 70 years ago
- Ground: Brahenkenttä; Helsinki, Finland
- Capacity: 1,000
- Chairman: Petri Vanhala
- Head coach: Lari Lummepuro
- League: Ykkönen
- 2026: Ykkösliiga, 9th of 10 (relegated via play-offs)
| Home colours | Away colours |

Käpylän Pallo, commonly referred to as KäPa for short, is a football (soccer) club from the Käpylä district of Helsinki. The club currently plays in the Ykkösliiga, the new second tier of the Finnish league system. Their home arena is Max Westerberg Areena in Käpylän liikuntapuisto, Käpylä, Helsinki. KäPa first team currently play their home matches at the Brahenkenttä, Helsinki due to the requirements in the second-tier.

== Background ==
The club played 21 seasons in the Kakkonen (Second Division), the third tier of Finnish football, in 1979, 1983–1989, 1997–2007 and 2009–2012. KäPa played one season in the Ykkönen (First Division), the second tier of Finnish football, in 2008 and one season in the Kolmonen, the fourth tier of Finnish football, in 2012.

KäPa was the first club in Finland to organise football leagues for youth players. The teams in these leagues were named after English League clubs and some teams even received their shirts as gifts from the English clubs they were named for. It has youth teams in a wide range of age groups, and it is the organiser of Finland's biggest youth football tournament, Helsinki Cup, together with FC Honka.

== Current squad ==
As of 3 September 2026

Note: Flags indicate national team as defined under FIFA eligibility rules; some limited exceptions apply. Players may hold more than one non-FIFA nationality.

| No. | Pos. | Nation | Player |
|---|---|---|---|
| 1 | GK | FIN | Tuomas Collin |
| 2 | DF | FIN | Urho Huhtamäki |
| 3 | DF | FIN | Samuel Puputti |
| 4 | DF | FIN | Pekka Hietalahti |
| 5 | DF | FIN | Pontus Lindberg |
| 6 | DF | FIN | Niko Nurmi |
| 7 | MF | FIN | Niklas Leinonen |
| 8 | MF | FIN | Reko Huhtamäki |
| 10 | FW | FIN | Yllson Lika |
| 11 | FW | FIN | Samba Sillah |
| 12 | FW | FIN | Samu Herronen |
| 15 | DF | FIN | Antti Pastinen |
| 16 | FW | FIN | Samu Herronen |
| 17 | MF | FIN | Viljami Jokiranta |
| 18 | DF | FIN | Elias Jantunen |

| No. | Pos. | Nation | Player |
|---|---|---|---|
| 19 | FW | FIN | Toivo Koivuranta |
| 20 | MF | FIN | Chris Malinen |
| 21 | FW | FIN | Daniel Rökman |
| 22 | MF | FIN | Daniel Ripatti |
| 25 | MF | FIN | Mikko Kuningas |
| 26 | FW | FIN | Hugo Toivonen |
| 28 | FW | FIN | Elmeri Lappalainen |
| 29 | DF | FIN | Joonas Salmi |
| 30 | GK | FIN | Luka Nokelainen |
| 31 | MF | FIN | Keaton Isaksson |
| 35 | GK | FIN | Otto Brusiin |
| 37 | DF | FIN | Otto Heinonen |
| 39 | DF | FIN | Sebastian Savini |
| 53 | FW | FIN | Aito Pitkänen |

=== Out on loan ===
Note: Flags indicate national team as defined under FIFA eligibility rules; some limited exceptions apply. Players may hold more than one non-FIFA nationality.

| No. | Pos. | Nation | Player |

== Season to season ==
Season to season of KäPa
- 4 season in Ykkönen/Ykkösliiga (Tier 2)
- 32 seasons in Ykkönen/Kakkonen/II Divisioona/Maakuntasarja (Tier 3)
- 24 season in Kolmonen (Tier 4)
- 1 season in Nelonen (Tier 5)

| Season | Level | Division | Section | Administration | Position | Movements |
|---|---|---|---|---|---|---|
| 1959 | Tier 4 | Aluesarja (Fourth Division) | Group 2 | Helsinki & Uusimaa (SPL Helsinki) | 4th | |
| 1960 | Tier 4 | Aluesarja (Fourth Division) | Group 2 | Helsinki & Uusimaa (SPL Helsinki) | 1st | Promotion Playoff - Promoted |
| 1961 | Tier 3 | Maakuntasarja (Third Division) | Group 1 | Finnish FA (Suomen Palloliitto) | 8th | Relegated |
| 1962 | Tier 4 | Aluesarja (Fourth Division) | Group 1 | Helsinki & Uusimaa (SPL Helsinki) | | Withdrew |
| 1963 | | | | | | |
| 1964 | | | | | | |
| 1965 | | | | | | |
| 1966 | | | | | | |
| 1967 | | | | | | |
| 1968 | | | | | | |
| 1969 | Tier 4 | Aluesarja (Fourth Division) | Group 1 | Helsinki & Uusimaa (SPL Helsinki) | 5th | |
| 1970 | Tier 4 | IV Divisioona (Fourth Division) | Group 1 | Helsinki & Uusimaa (SPL Helsinki) | 2nd | |
| 1971 | Tier 4 | IV Divisioona (Fourth Division) | Group 1 | Helsinki & Uusimaa (SPL Helsinki) | 4th | |
| 1972 | Tier 4 | IV Divisioona (Fourth Division) | Group 2 | Helsinki & Uusimaa (SPL Helsinki) | 1st | Promoted |
| 1973 | Tier 4 | III Divisioona (Third Division) | Group 1 | Helsinki & Uusimaa (SPL Helsinki) | 7th | |
| 1974 | Tier 4 | III Divisioona (Third Division) | Group 1 | Helsinki & Uusimaa (SPL Helsinki) | 8th | |
| 1975 | Tier 4 | III Divisioona (Third Division) | Group 2 | Helsinki & Uusimaa (SPL Helsinki) | 5th | |
| 1976 | Tier 4 | III Divisioona (Third Division) | Group 2 | Helsinki & Uusimaa (SPL Helsinki) | 7th | |
| 1977 | Tier 4 | III Divisioona (Third Division) | Group 1 | Helsinki & Uusimaa (SPL Helsinki) | 3rd | |
| 1978 | Tier 4 | III Divisioona (Third Division) | Group 2 | Helsinki & Uusimaa (SPL Helsinki) | 1st | Promotion Playoff - Promoted |
| 1979 | Tier 3 | II Divisioona (Second Division) | East Group | Finnish FA (Suomen Palloliitto) | 10th | Relegated |
| 1980 | Tier 4 | III Divisioona (Third Division) | Group 1 | Helsinki & Uusimaa (SPL Helsinki) | 5th | |
| 1981 | Tier 4 | III Divisioona (Third Division) | Group 2 | Helsinki & Uusimaa (SPL Helsinki) | 2nd | Promotion Playoff |
| 1982 | Tier 4 | III Divisioona (Third Division) | Group 1 | Helsinki & Uusimaa (SPL Helsinki) | 1st | Promotion Playoff - Promoted |
| 1983 | Tier 3 | II Divisioona (Second Division) | East Group | Finnish FA (Suomen Palloliitto) | 8th | |
| 1984 | Tier 3 | II Divisioona (Second Division) | East Group | Finnish FA (Suomen Palloliitto) | 8th | |
| 1985 | Tier 3 | II Divisioona (Second Division) | West Group | Finnish FA (Suomen Palloliitto) | 7th | |
| 1986 | Tier 3 | II Divisioona (Second Division) | East Group | Finnish FA (Suomen Palloliitto) | 5th | |
| 1987 | Tier 3 | II Divisioona (Second Division) | East Group | Finnish FA (Suomen Palloliitto) | 4th | |
| 1988 | Tier 3 | II Divisioona (Second Division) | West Group | Finnish FA (Suomen Palloliitto) | 6th | |
| 1989 | Tier 3 | II Divisioona (Second Division) | East Group | Finnish FA (Suomen Palloliitto) | 10th | Relegated |
| 1990 | Tier 4 | III Divisioona (Third Division) | Group 1 | Helsinki & Uusimaa (SPL Helsinki) | 8th | |
| 1991 | Tier 4 | III Divisioona (Third Division) | Group 2 | Helsinki & Uusimaa (SPL Helsinki) | 4th | |
| 1992 | Tier 4 | III Divisioona (Third Division) | Group 2 | Helsinki & Uusimaa (SPL Helsinki) | 8th | |
| 1993 | Tier 4 | Kolmonen (Third Division) | Group 2 | Helsinki & Uusimaa (SPL Helsinki) | 6th | |
| 1994 | Tier 4 | Kolmonen (Third Division) | Group 2 | Helsinki & Uusimaa (SPL Helsinki) | 10th | Relegated |
| 1995 | Tier 5 | Nelonen (Fourth Division) | Group 2 | Helsinki District (SPL Helsinki) | 1st | Promoted |
| 1996 | Tier 4 | Kolmonen (Third Division) | Group 1 | Helsinki & Uusimaa (SPL Helsinki) | 2nd | Promotion Playoff - Promoted |
| 1997 | Tier 3 | Kakkonen (Second Division) | East Group | Finnish FA (Suomen Palloliitto) | 6th | |
| 1998 | Tier 3 | Kakkonen (Second Division) | East Group | Finnish FA (Suomen Palloliitto) | 9th | |
| 1999 | Tier 3 | Kakkonen (Second Division) | West Group | Finnish FA (Suomen Palloliitto) | 6th | |
| 2000 | Tier 3 | Kakkonen (Second Division) | South Group | Finnish FA (Suomen Palloliitto) | 4th | |
| 2001 | Tier 3 | Kakkonen (Second Division) | South Group | Finnish FA (Suomen Palloliitto) | 5th | |
| 2002 | Tier 3 | Kakkonen (Second Division) | South Group | Finnish FA (Suomen Palloliitto) | 4th | |
| 2003 | Tier 3 | Kakkonen (Second Division) | South Group | Finnish FA (Suomen Palloliitto) | 6th | |
| 2004 | Tier 3 | Kakkonen (Second Division) | South Group | Finnish FA (Suomen Palloliitto) | 11th | |
| 2005 | Tier 3 | Kakkonen (Second Division) | South Group | Finnish FA (Suomen Palloliitto) | 5th | |
| 2006 | Tier 3 | Kakkonen (Second Division) | Group A | Finnish FA (Suomen Palloliitto) | 5th | |
| 2007 | Tier 3 | Kakkonen (Second Division) | Group A | Finnish FA (Suomen Palloliitto) | 1st | Promoted |
| 2008 | Tier 2 | Ykkönen (First Division) | | Finnish FA (Suomen Palloliitto) | 14th | Relegated |
| 2009 | Tier 3 | Kakkonen (Second Division) | Group A | Finnish FA (Suomen Palloliitto) | 3rd | |
| 2010 | Tier 3 | Kakkonen (Second Division) | Group A | Finnish FA (Suomen Palloliitto) | 10th | |
| 2011 | Tier 3 | Kakkonen (Second Division) | Group A | Finnish FA (Suomen Palloliitto) | 14th | Relegated |
| 2012 | Tier 4 | Kolmonen (Second Division) | Section 1 | Helsinki & Uusimaa (SPL Uusimaa) | 1st | Promoted |
| 2013 | Tier 3 | Kakkonen (Second Division) | South Group | Finnish FA (Suomen Palloliitto) | 7th | |
| 2014 | Tier 3 | Kakkonen (Second Division) | South Group | Finnish FA (Suomen Palloliitto) | 4th | |
| 2015 | Tier 3 | Kakkonen (Second Division) | South Group | Finnish FA (Suomen Palloliitto) | 3rd | |
| 2016 | Tier 3 | Kakkonen (Second Division) | Group A | Finnish FA (Suomen Palloliitto) | 8th | |
| 2017 | Tier 3 | Kakkonen (Second Division) | Group B | Finnish FA (Suomen Palloliitto) | 7th | |
| 2018 | Tier 3 | Kakkonen (Second Division) | Group B | Finnish FA (Suomen Palloliitto) | 8th | |
| 2019 | Tier 3 | Kakkonen (Second Division) | Group B | Finnish FA (Suomen Palloliitto) | 11th | Relegated |
| 2020 | Tier 4 | Kolmonen (Second Division) | Group A | Finnish FA (Suomen Palloliitto) | 1st | Promotion Playoff - Promoted |
| 2021 | Tier 3 | Kakkonen (Second Division) | Group A | Finnish FA (Suomen Palloliitto) | 7th | |
| 2022 | Tier 3 | Kakkonen (Second Division) | Group A | Finnish FA (Suomen Palloliitto) | 1st | Promoted |
| 2023 | Tier 2 | Ykkönen (First Division) | | Finnish FA (Suomen Palloliitto) | 10th | Remained in second level due to Bankcrupties of FC Honka and HIFK |
| 2024 | Tier 2 | Ykkösliiga (League One) | | Finnish FA (Suomen Palloliitto) | 9th | Won Relegation Playoff |
| 2025 | Tier 2 | Ykkösliiga (League One) | | Finnish FA (Suomen Palloliitto) | | |

== Club structure ==
KäPa currently has 2 men's teams, 1 veterans' team, 1 ladies' team, 24 boys' teams and 7 girls' teams. The club operates a large junior section and is able to take full advantage of the extensive training facilities at the indoor Käpylän Juniorihalli (Käpylä Junior Hall). The club provides a number of additional initiatives, including sports camps and events.

== References and sources ==
- Official Website
- Finnish Wikipedia
- Suomen Cup
- Käpylän Pallo Facebook
