= PEPO Lappeenranta =

Finnish football club

PEPO
- Full name: PEPO Lappeenranta
- Nickname: PEPO
- Founded: 1958; 68 years ago
- Ground: Kimpinen; Lappeenranta, Finland
- Chairman: Kari Suninen
- Head coach: Tero Nieminen
- League: Kakkonen
- 2026: Kakkonen Group A, 2nd of 10
Home colours

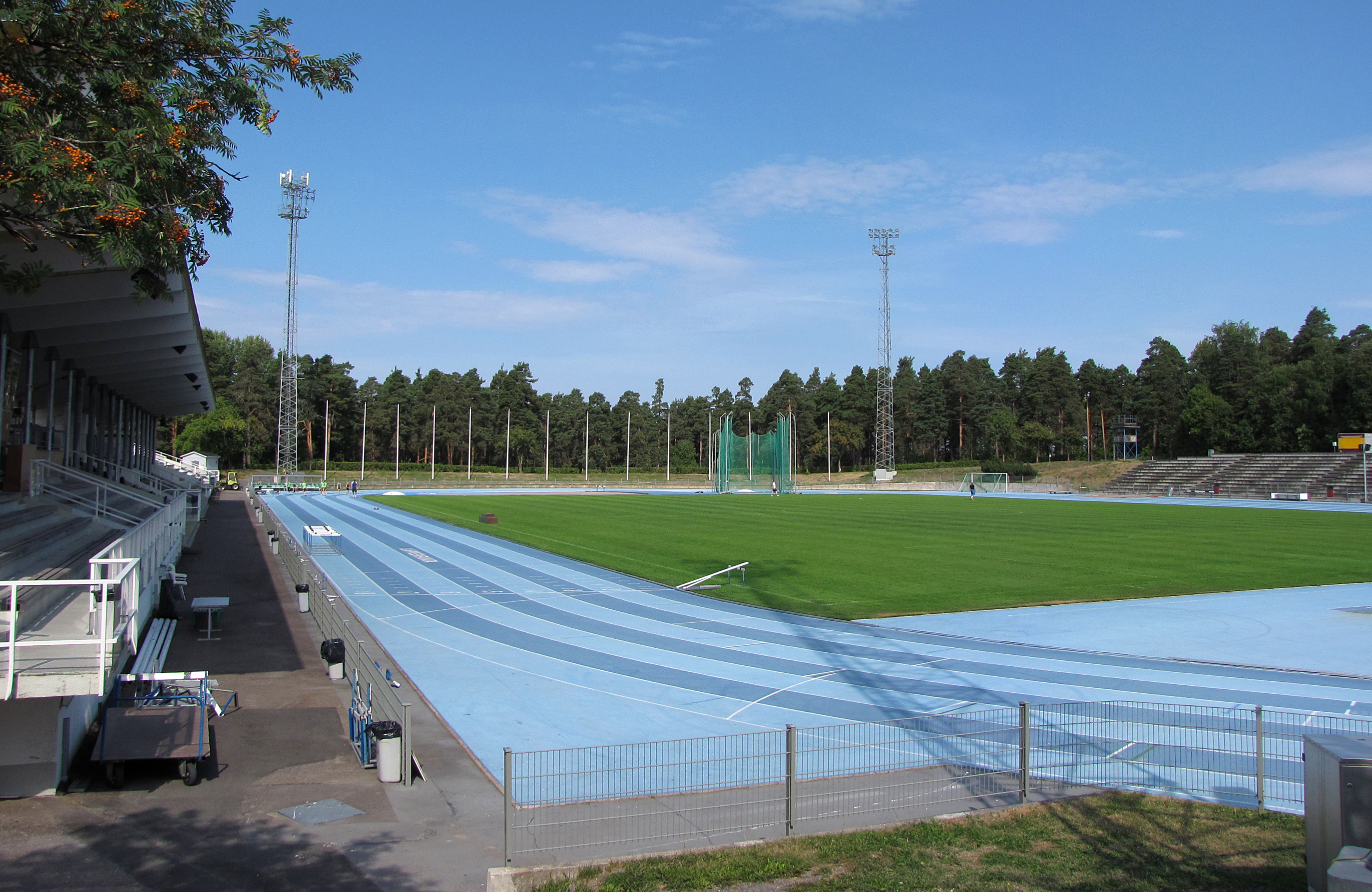
Kimpisen urheilukeskus

PEPO Lappeenranta (abbreviated PEPO, earlier Uus-Lavolan Peli-Pojat) is a Finnish football club from Uus-Lavola, Lappeenranta. The club was formed in 1958 and their home ground is at the Kimpinen Sports Centre. The men's first team currently plays in the Kakkonen. The chairman of PEPO is Kari Suninen and the men's first team is managed by Tero Nieminen.

== History ==
PEPO's inaugural meeting was held at the Lavola School in Lappee municipality on 12 November 1958. The name of the club was chosen as Uus-Lavolan Peli-Pojat at the first annual general meeting of the club held on 30 November 1958. The first official match played by the club was at the Vanha kenttä against Lauritsalan Pallokerho on 10 May 1959.

During the 1970s and 1980s PEPO played in the lower divisions of the Finnish football system in the Nelonen (Fourth Division) and Vitonen (Fifth Division). Between 1973 and 1975 the club also ran a women's team. In 1987 the men's team were promoted to the Kolmonen (Third Division) but their visit lasted only one year. In the mid-1990s PEPO changed league several times playing in the Nelonen in 1994, Kolmonen in 1995, Kakkonen (Second Division) in 1996 before returning to the Kolmonen again in 1997.

The 1996 season proved a big disappointment in the Kakkonen when despite a good start with three wins and a draw there followed a downturn, which not even the former national team coach Jukka Vakkila, who came to coach Markku Timonen's aid, could stop.

PEPO played their second season in the Kakkonen in 2001 in the Eastern Group and finished in the tenth position which was the final relegation position. In 2002 the club reached the sixth round of the Finnish Cup which was the highest attained by a club playing in Kolmonen or below. PEPO lost 5–0 at home to Premier Division side Haka but the reward for their achievement was to be Finland's representative in the UEFA Regions' Cup, an amateur tournament, in which they faced the teams from Belgium (the host country), Andorra and Spain. PEPO lost their three tournament games with a goal difference of 3–12.

In January 2009 PEPO merged with the Rakuunat youth organisation Rakuunat Juniorit. As a result of the merger also the Rakuunat Juniorit women's team playing in the Kakkonen (Second Division) moved under the auspices of PEPO. In 2009 the men's team again tasted success by winning their Kolmonen group and gaining promotion back to the Kakkonen.

== Season to season ==
Season to season of PEPO

Season	Level	Division	Section	Administration	Position	Movements
1963	Tier 4	Aluesarja (Area Series)	Group 11	Finnish FA (Suomen Pallolitto)	7th	Relegated
1964						Unknown
1965	Tier 4	Aluesarja (Area Series)	Group 11	Finnish FA (Suomen Pallolitto)	4th	
1966	Tier 4	Aluesarja (Area Series)	Group 11	Finnish FA (Suomen Pallolitto)	2nd	
1967	Tier 4	Aluesarja (Area Series)	Group 11	Finnish FA (Suomen Pallolitto)	6th	Relegated
1968						Unknown
1969	Tier 4	Aluesarja (Area Series)	Group 10	Finnish FA (Suomen Pallolitto)	5th	
1970	Tier 4	4. Divisioona (Fourth Division)	Group 11	Finnish FA (Suomen Pallolitto)	2nd	
1971	Tier 4	4. Divisioona (Fourth Division)	Group 8	Finnish FA (Suomen Pallolitto)	2nd	
1972	Tier 4	4. Divisioona (Fourth Division)	Group 11	Finnish FA (Suomen Pallolitto)	6th	
1973	Tier 5	4. Divisioona (Fourth Division)	Group 11 Saimaa	Finnish FA (Suomen Pallolitto)	9th	Relegated
1974						Unknown
1975	Tier 5	4. Divisioona (Fourth Division)	Group 12 Saimaa	Finnish FA (Suomen Pallolitto)	10th	Relegated
1976						Unknown
1977						Unknown
1978	Tier 5	4. Divisioona (Fourth Division)	Group 12 Saimaa	Finnish FA (Suomen Pallolitto)	11th	Relegated
1979						Unknown
1980						Unknown
1981						Unknown
1982						Unknown
1983						Unknown
1984						Unknown
1985						Unknown
1986	Tier 5	4. Divisioona (Fourth Division)	Group 11 Saimaa	Finnish FA (Suomen Pallolitto)	9th	
1987						Unknown
1988						Unknown
1989						Unknown
1990	Tier 4	3. Divisioona (Third Division)	Group 6	Finnish FA (Suomen Pallolitto)	12th	Relegated
1991						Unknown
1992	Tier 4	3. Divisioona (Third Division)	Group 6	Finnish FA (Suomen Pallolitto)	10th	Relegated
1993						Unknown
1994						Unknown
1995	Tier 4	Kolmonen (Third Division)	Group 5	South-East Finland (SPL Kaakkois-Suomi)	1st	Promoted
1996	Tier 3	Kakkonen (Second Division)	East Group	Finnish FA (Suomen Pallolitto)	10th	Relegated
1997	Tier 4	Kolmonen (Third Division)	Group 5	South-East Finland (SPL Kaakkois-Suomi)	5th	
1998	Tier 4	Kolmonen (Third Division)	Group 5	South-East Finland (SPL Kaakkois-Suomi)	6th	
1999	Tier 4	Kolmonen (Third Division)	South-East Finland	South-East Finland (SPL Kaakkois-Suomi)	7th	
2000	Tier 4	Kolmonen (Third Division)	South-East Finland	South-East Finland (SPL Kaakkois-Suomi)	2nd	Promotion Playoff - Promoted
2001	Tier 3	Kakkonen (Second Division)	East Group	Finnish FA (Suomen Pallolitto)	10th	Relegated
2002	Tier 4	Kolmonen (Third Division)		South-East Finland (SPL Kaakkois-Suomi)	5th	
2003	Tier 4	Kolmonen (Third Division)		South-East Finland (SPL Kaakkois-Suomi)	3rd	
2004	Tier 4	Kolmonen (Third Division)		South-East Finland (SPL Kaakkois-Suomi)	4th	
2005	Tier 4	Kolmonen (Third Division)		South-East Finland (SPL Kaakkois-Suomi)	6th	
2006	Tier 4	Kolmonen (Third Division)		South-East Finland (SPL Kaakkois-Suomi)	5th	
2007	Tier 4	Kolmonen (Third Division)		South-East Finland (SPL Kaakkois-Suomi)	5th	
2008	Tier 4	Kolmonen (Third Division)		South-East Finland (SPL Kaakkois-Suomi)	2nd	
2009	Tier 4	Kolmonen (Third Division)		South-East Finland (SPL Kaakkois-Suomi)	1st	Promoted
2010	Tier 3	Kakkonen (Second Division)	Group A	Finnish FA (Suomen Pallolitto)	12	Relegated
2011	Tier 4	Kolmonen (Third Division)		South-East Finland (SPL Kaakkois-Suomi)	1st	Promotion Playoff
2012	Tier 4	Kolmonen (Third Division)		South-East Finland (SPL Kaakkois-Suomi)	6th	
2013	Tier 4	Kolmonen (Third Division)		South-East Finland (SPL Kaakkois-Suomi)	3rd	
2014	Tier 4	Kolmonen (Third Division)		South-East Finland (SPL Kaakkois-Suomi)	5th	
2015	Tier 4	Kolmonen (Third Division)		South-East Finland (SPL Kaakkois-Suomi)	1st	Promoted
2016	Tier 3	Kakkonen (Second Division)	Group A	Finnish FA (Suomen Pallolitto)	6th	
2017	Tier 3	Kakkonen (Second Division)	Group A	Finnish FA (Suomen Pallolitto)	3rd	
2018	Tier 3	Kakkonen (Second Division)	Group A	Finnish FA (Suomen Pallolitto)	5th	
2019	Tier 3	Kakkonen (Second Division)	Group A	Finnish FA (Suomen Pallolitto)	7th	
2020	Tier 3	Kakkonen (Second Division)	Group A	Finnish FA (Suomen Pallolitto)	2nd	
2021	Tier 3	Kakkonen (Second Division)	Group A	Finnish FA (Suomen Pallolitto)	2nd	
2022	Tier 2	Ykkönen (First Division)		Finnish FA (Suomen Pallolitto)	11th	
2023	Tier 3	Kakkonen (Second Division)	Group A	Finnish FA (Suomen Pallolitto)	7th	
2024	Tier 4	Kakkonen (Second Division)	Group A	Finnish FA (Suomen Pallolitto)	6th	
2025	Tier 4	Kakkonen (Second Division)	Group A	Finnish FA (Suomen Pallolitto)		

- 2 seasons in Kakkonen
- 9 seasons in Kolmonen

== Other sports ==
PEPO selected football as the main sporting activity soon after the establishment of the club. However, the club played ice hockey for 39 years until 1999 when the ice hockey section was relocated to PEPO Hockey.

== Facilities ==
The club's training centre is located in Sammonlahti, a western district of Lappeenranta. The training centre provides grass and artificial turf pitches. Since 2009 the men's team has played their home games at the Kimpinen Sports Centre in the Kimpinen district. A heated artificial turf pitch next to the South Karelia Vocational School in the Lepola district and the Sammonlahti Sports Hall are used during winter.

Until the 2000s PEPO's home ground was in Tapavainola.

== Youth activities ==
PEPO has a strong youth section. This position was further strengthened by the merger with Rakuunat Juniorit at the beginning of 2009, which has created one of the biggest soccer teams in the area administered by the South-East regional office of the Football Association of Finland. In addition to the men's and women's teams PEPO currently has 8 boys' teams and 3 girls' teams. Another important constituent is the close association with Lappee JK, a sister club that fields PEPO's reserve team in the Nelonen (Fourth Division) and an under-17 team.

PEPO has received numerous recognitions including the Seal of the Young Finland Association for the quality of their youth work. The club has employed a full-time youth head coach since 2002 and a youth director since 2009.

The club has extended its international links with cooperation ties with FC Utrecht, Fortuna Sittard and SO Soest.

== Competition ==
PEPO's men's team are competing in Group C of the Kakkonen (Third Division) administered by the Football Association of Finland. This is the third highest tier in the Finnish football league system. In 2009 PEPO finished in first position in the South-East group of the Kolmonen (Fourth Division).

PEPO's women's team are competing in Group A of the Kakkonen (Second Division) administered by the Football Association of Finland.

== Current squad ==
Note: Flags indicate national team as defined under FIFA eligibility rules; some limited exceptions apply. Players may hold more than one non-FIFA nationality.

No.	Pos.	Nation	Player
3	DF	FIN	Markus Kyläheiko
4	DF	FIN	Niko Pyyhtiä
5	DF	FIN	Arttu Kotanen
6	DF	FIN	Iivo Jaako
8	DF	FIN	Jens Harju
9	MF	FIN	Eetu Suoraniemi
10	MF	FIN	Jerry Särkkä
11	FW	COL	Edwin Salazar
12	GK	USA	Craig Hill
13	FW	FIN	Antti Voutilainen
14	FW	FIN	Petteri Rönkkö
15	DF	FIN	Joel Laitinen

No.	Pos.	Nation	Player
16	MF	FIN	Tomi Karttunen
17	DF	GAM	Alieu Ceesay
18	MF	FIN	Elmo Aavela
19	DF	FIN	Markus Koistinen
20	MF	NGR	Jonathan Dunyin
21	FW	SSD	Akeg Deng
23	MF	PUR	Alex Oikkonen
26	FW	FIN	Joona Viskari
27	DF	FIN	Nikke Veikkanen
30	GK	FIN	Simo Partinen
32	GK	FIN	Miikka Autiomäki

== References and sources ==
- Official Website
- Suomen Cup
