= Pirkkalan Jalkapalloklubi =

Finnish football club

- Full name: Pirkkalan Jalkapalloklubi
- Nickname(s): PJK
- Founded: 1993
- Ground: Pirkkalan keskuskenttä, Pirkkala, Finland
- Chairman: Esa Ojala
- Coach: Petri Nieminen
- League: Kolmonen
Home colours

Pirkkalan Jalkapalloklubi (abbreviated PJK) is a football club from Pirkkala, Finland. The club was formed in 1993 and their home ground is at the Pirkkalan keskuskenttä. The men's first team currently plays in the Kolmonen (Third Division).

== Background ==
PJK was established in 1993 and has played in the lower levels of Finnish football (mainly in Divisions 3 and 4). The one exception was in 2009 when the club spent a season in the third tier, the Kakkonen (Second Division).

In 2008 and 2009 the club's ladies team played in the Ladies Kakkonen (Second Division) – Group B. The Men's futsal team reached the Finnish Cup semi-finals in the 2007–2008 season.

PJK's most notable former player is Miki Sipiläinen who played for the club in the 2008 season.

== Season to season ==
Season	Level	Division	Section	Administration	Position	Movements
2001	Tier 5	Nelonen (Fourth Division)	South Section	Tampere District (SPL Tampere)	2nd	
2002	Tier 5	Nelonen (Fourth Division)	South Section	Tampere District (SPL Tampere)	2nd	
2003	Tier 5	Nelonen (Fourth Division)	South Section	Tampere District (SPL Tampere)	3rd	
2004	Tier 5	Nelonen (Fourth Division)	South Section	Tampere District (SPL Tampere)	1st	Promoted
2005	Tier 4	Kolmonen (Third Division)		Tampere District (SPL Tampere)	9th	
2006	Tier 4	Kolmonen (Third Division)		Tampere District (SPL Tampere)	5th	
2007	Tier 4	Kolmonen (Third Division)		Tampere District (SPL Tampere)	2nd	
2008	Tier 4	Kolmonen (Third Division)		Tampere District (SPL Tampere)	1st	Promoted
2009	Tier 3	Kakkonen (Second Division)	Group B	Finnish FA (Suomen Pallolitto)	14th	Relegated
2010	Tier 4	Kolmonen (Third Division)		Tampere District (SPL Tampere)		

- 1 season in Kakkonen
- 5 seasons in Kolmonen
- 4 season in Nelonen

== Club structure ==
Pirkkalan Jalkapalloklubi run a number of teams including 3 men's teams, 1 ladies team, 1 men's veterans team, 11 boys teams and 1 girls team. In total the club has a total of more than 300 registered players.

== 2010 season ==
PJK Men's Team are competing in the Kolmonen (Third Division) section administered by the Tampere SPL. This is the fourth highest tier in the Finnish football system. In 2009 PJK finished in last place in Group B of the Kakkonen (Second Division) and were relegated.

PJK /2 are participating in the Nelonen (Fourth Division) administered by the Tampere SPL.

PJK /3 are participating in Section 1 (Lohko 1) of the Kutonen (Sixth Division) administered by the Tampere SPL.

== References and sources ==
- Official Website
- Finnish Wikipedia
- Suomen Cup
- PJK Facebook
