= 2022 Finnish Cup =

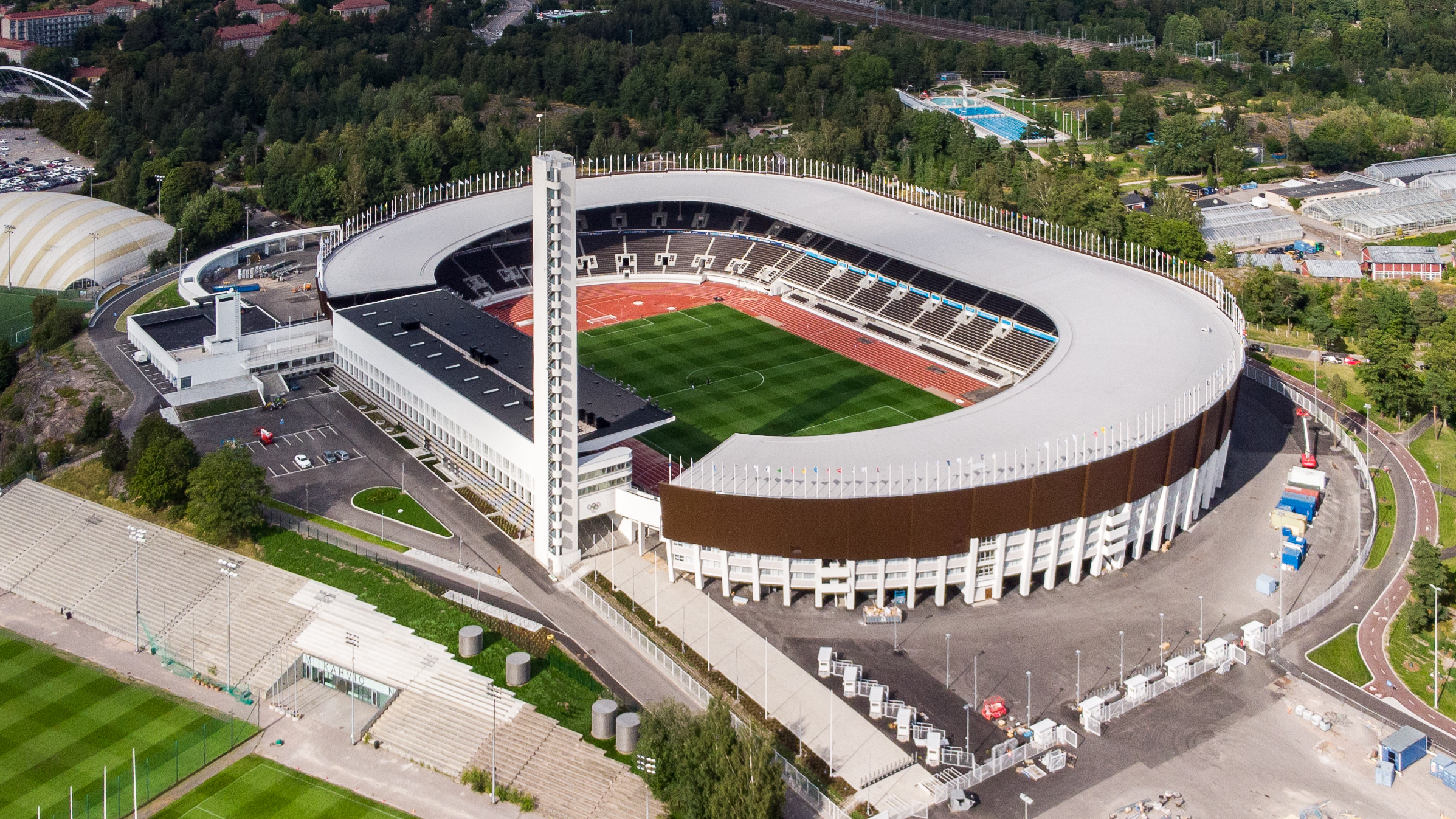
- Helsinki Olympic Stadium

Tournament details
- Country: Finland
- Teams: 314

Final positions
- Champions: KuPS
- Runners-up: FC Inter Turku

Tournament statistics
- Matches played: 288

The 2022 Finnish Cup was the 68th season of the Finnish Cup football competition.

For the first time since 2016, the 2022 tournament will be played as a traditional knockout tournament without group stages. A total of 314 teams participate the competition, a record number since 2009.

KuPS won its second consecutive Cup and the fourth in club history and have qualified for the 2023-24 UEFA Europa Conference League

== Calendar ==
| Round | Dates | Draw | Number of fixtures | Clubs |
|---|---|---|---|---|
| Round 0 | 11-27 February 2022 | 20 January | 26 | 52 → 26 +206 |
| First round | 11 February -13 March 2022 | 20 January | 116 | 232 → 116 |
| Second round | 19 March - 3 April | 27 January | 58 | 116 → 58 +50 from Veikkausliiga, Ykkönen, Kakkonen |
| Third round | 6-22 April 2022 | 24 March | 54 | 108 → 54 +2 from Veikkausliiga(League Cup) |
| Fourth round | 30 April -8 May 2022 | 21 April | 28 | 56 → 28 +4 from Veikkausliiga(UEFA Competitions) |
| Fifth round | 24–26 May 2022 | 12 May | 16 | 32 → 16 |
| Sixth round | 15 June 2022 | 31 May | 8 | 16 → 8 |
| Quarter-finals | 29 June 2022 | 31 May | 4 | 8 → 4 |
| Semi-finals | 31 August 2022 | | 2 | 4 → 2 |
| Final | 17 September 2022 | | 1 | 2 → 1 |

== Round 0 ==
52 teams participate in this round

Number of teams per tier still in competition
| Veikkausliiga (1) | Ykkönen (2) | Kakkonen (3) | Kolmonen (4) | Nelonen (5) | Vitonen (6) | Kutonen (7) | Seiska (8) | M35 (+35) | Total |
|---|---|---|---|---|---|---|---|---|---|
| 12 / 12 | 12 / 12 | 32 / 32 | 67 / 67 | 58 / 58 | 69 / 69 | 47 / 47 | 9 / 9 | 8 / 8 | 314 / 314 |

| 24 February 2022 | FC Ruskon Pallo (6) | 6-2 | KuuLa (6) | Naantali |
| 20:15 | Jylhä 32', 81'; J Lehtinen 57'; S Salmi 64'; Hintukainen 66' (72) | Report | Shwaish 43', 46' | Stadium: Karvetti; Referee: Vili Lehtovaara |

| 26 February 2022 | Lieto (5) | 0-3 | ÅCF (5) | Naantali |
| 15:00 | | Report | J Snicker 53'; Makkonen 78'; Lastula 83' | Stadium: Karvetti; Referee: Santeri Ojala |

| 24 February 2022 | Paimion Haka (4) | 0-5 | ÅIFK (4) | Paimio |
| 19:00 | | Report | Djibalene 12', 65', 85'; Mäki-Arvela 50'; Terrnava 60' | Stadium: Soikka; Attendance: 58; Referee: Samuli Stenman |

| 26 February 2022 | PEP (6) | 1-2 | SAPA/2 (6) | Laaksolahti |
| 19:00 | Dauber 90' | Report | Muhire 62'; Ju Ojala 66' | Stadium: Laaksolahti Halli; Attendance: 12; Referee: Otto Helin |

| 11 February 2022 | PPS/Diablos Rojos (7) | 2-10 | KäPa/NoLe (5) | Vantaa |
| 20:00 | Aldrete 4'; Kivelä 27' | Report | Lindfors 6'; Toikka 12', 14', 62', 67', 90'; Rolig 29', 59', 63'; Palen 75' | Stadium: Kalmuuri Halli; Attendance: 12; Referee: Gezim Arifi |

| 19 February 2022 | SexyPöxyt M35 (+35) | 0-7 | HPS (4) | Kauniainen |
| 19:00 | | Report | Laaksonen 5', 7', 39'; Ignatius 38', 65'; Kaivola 64'; Mäkinen 87' | Stadium: FA Solutions tekonurmi Referee: Mikko Mörö |

| 11 February 2022 | FC Kontu/TDJ (8) | 1-11 | FC Kirkkonummi (4) | Helsinki |
| 20:00 | Kuronen 18' | Report | Lehtinen 10', 36'; Nieminen 26'; Siekkinen 31'; Nylund 33'; Arifi 38'; Al-Khazaali 44'; Ruohomäki 48'; Turunen 68'; Leilas 83'; Saarikivi T 87' | Stadium: Kartano 2 Attendance: 20; Referee: Jesse Aalto |

| 12 February 2022 | Olarin Kiksi (6) | 0-8 | FC Espoo (4) | Espoo |
| 17:00 | | Report | Isoniemi 16'; Yeboah 19'; Lie 33', 61'; Kauhanen 36'; Msambya 48'; Musawi 57'; Stening 68' | Stadium: Espoonlahti 2 Attendance: 70; Referee: Rasmus Rissanen |

| 19 February 2022 | Helsingin Ponnistus (5) | 2-3 | PuiU (4) | Helsinki |
| 17:00 | Paananen 14'; Mohamed Abdih 37' | Report | Tiainen 0'; Kuula 52'; Samir Talat 84' | Stadium: Töölö 6 Referee: Matias Marjander |

| 20 February 2022 | Nikinmäki United (7) | 0-3 | EBK/Reservi (5) | Tikkurila |
| 20:00 | | Report | Hautapakka 20'; Mehinovic 53'; McMullen 76' | Stadium: Tikkurila; Referee: Jani Karttunen |

| 18 February 2022 | FC Hieho (6) | 0-5 | VJS/2 (5) | Helsinki |
| 20:00 | | Report | Varis 20'; Koso 65'; Pasanen 82', 90'; Laitila 89' | Stadium: Töölön Pallokenttä 6 Attendance: 20; Referee: Jouni Tuominen |

| 26 February 2022 | Käpylä Maanantai (6) | w/o (0-3) | PK-35/2 (5) | Helsinki |
| 19:00 | | Report | | Stadium: Töölön Pallokenttä 6 |

| 13 February 2022 | FC Wild/2 (6) | 1-7 | TiPS (4) | Nummela |
| 20:00 | Vuorenmaa 31' | Report | Ceni 13', 28', 61', 79'; Ailio 76', 89'; Tiainen 87' | Stadium: Certos Areena; Attendance: 50; Referee: Niklas Heikkonen |

| 25 February 2022 | Chicken Wings (5) | 0-4 | HIFK/2 (4) | Helsinki |
| 20:00 | | Report | Gökcil 21'; Heiskanen 26'; Kiema 82'; Macdonald-Thomé 84' | Stadium: Kartano 2 Referee: Miika Pesonen |

| 19 February 2022 | HooGee (5) | 0-5 | MPS/2020 (4) | Matinkylä, Espoo |
| 18:00 | | Report | Talka 23'; Lindqvist 34'; Vuoripelto 41', 90+1'; Stockus 42' | Stadium: Matinkylä 1 Referee: Osman Mohammadi |

| 23 February 2022 | FC Honka/Leopardit (7) | 1-0 | Colo-Colo (6) | Helsinki |
| 19:00 | Winogradow 67' | Report | | Stadium: Töölön Pallokenttä Sahara; Attendance: 15; Referee: Theo Tyrväinen |

| 27 February 2022 | PoPo (7) | 1-5 | NouLa (4) | Kotka |
| 19:00 | Lahti 43' | Report | Mohamed Abdih 2', 32', 83'; Honkavirta 41'; Kitti 53' | Stadium: Urheiluhalli; Referee: Turo Veini |

| 19 February 2022 | Pakkalan Palloseura (6) | 4-4 (4-3 p) | Halkian Alku (5) | Vantaa |
| 19:10 | Zaidane 10', 22'; Vik Niemi 54', 90' | Report | Nyrhivaara 13', 45'; Te 72', 77' | Stadium: Kalmuuri Halli; Attendance: 35; Referee: Antti Kaitasuo |

| 25 February 2022 | Kellokosken Alku (6) | 4-0 | KJP/2 (5) | Tuusula |
| 19:10 | Kivimäki 22', 25'; Hirvimäki 32'; T Ronimus 65' | Report | | Stadium: Tuusulan Urheilukeskus; Attendance: 20; Referee: Niklas Heikkonen |

| 19 February 2022 | Askolan Urheilijat (7) | 1-1 (5-3 p) | FC LaPa/2 (5) | Järvenpää |
| 12:00 | Kyyhkynen Je 70' | Report | Haikulainen 43' | Stadium: Monitoimihallin tekonurmi Referee: Ibrahim Aksoy |

| 23 February 2022 | Pelikaani (7) | 0-1 | LAUTP (6) | Hyvinkää |
| 19:45 | | Report | M Ruokoniemi 46' | Stadium: Kankuri; Attendance: 5 Referee: Aki Tauriainen |

| 27 February 2022 | Janakkalan Pallo (7) | w/o (0-3) | Sääksjärven Loiske (4) |
| | | Report |

| 26 February 2022 | FC Kangasala (6) | 2-2 (3-2 p) | Nekalan Pallo (6) | Tampere |
| 15:45 | Juurikivi 16'; A Mäkelä 39' | Report | Al-Tallab 20'; J Tuominen 45+1' | Stadium: Kauppi 2 Attendance: 4 Referee: Ville Erkkilä |

| 13 February 2022 | Urjalan Palloseura (6) | 0-14 | P-Iirot (4) | Rauma |
| 15:00 | | Report | Arvela 5'; Ahde 8', 22'; Honkaniemi 18'; A Virtanen 32', 36', 82'; Jalkanen 40', 57'; Leppänen 49'; Salonen 53'; Ketola 84', 88'; Babb 87' | Stadium: Äijänsuo Stadion; Referee: Niko Parviainen |

| 20 February 2022 | LeKi-futis (5) | 0-4 | Tampere United/2 (4) | Tampere |
| 20:00 | | Report | Vähänen 32'; Jussila 45+2'; Silvennoinen 58'; Häkkinen 71' | Stadium: Pirkkahalli C Attendance: 100; Referee: Aleksi Keronen |

| 27 February 2022 | Mäntän Valo (7) | 1-4 | FC Harjavallan Pallo (6) | Tampere |
| 12:00 | Paavola 32' | Report | Ojanperä 45'; Virtanen 51', 76'; Hakala 89' | Stadium: Kauppi 1 Attendance: 4 Referee: Aleksi Keronen |

== First round ==
232 Teams, including 26 winners from Round 0 participate in this round. Winners proceed to second round. Before the draw teams were divided to 9 regional groups.

Number of teams per tier still in competition
| Veikkausliiga (1) | Ykkönen (2) | Kakkonen (3) | Kolmonen (4) | Nelonen (5) | Vitonen (6) | Kutonen (7) | Seiska (8) | M35 (+35) | Total |
|---|---|---|---|---|---|---|---|---|---|
| 12 / 12 | 12 / 12 | 32 / 32 | 66 / 67 | 50 / 58 | 60 / 69 | 41 / 47 | 8 / 9 | 7 / 8 | 288 / 314 |

=== Group 1 ===
| 6 March 2022 | Turun Toverit (7) | 0-7 | Jyrkkälän Tykit (5) | Turku |
| 16:00 | | Report | Kuusisto 3', 39', 65', 80'; Lehtonen 17', 40', 68' | Stadium: Kupittaa 5 Attendance: 20; Referee: Gabriel Anton |

| 8 March 2022 | TPS M35 (+35) | 2-0 | ÅCF (5) | Turku |
| 19:00 | Hyyrynen 40'; Ääritalo 45' | Report | | Stadium: Kupittaa 5 Referee: Einari Sario |

| 4 March 2022 | Nummelan Palloseura (5) | 2-0 | BK-46 (4) | Nummela |
| 19:00 | Athanasiadis 17'; Tuominen 47' | Report | | Stadium: Certos Areena Halli; Attendance: 80; Referee: Jan-Peter Aravirta |

| 13 March 2022 | TuNL (7) | 0-4 | SC Wolves (5) | Turku |
| 17:00 | | Report | Lindqvist 23'; Allen 35'; Filatoff 75'; Ahanen 85' | Stadium: Kupittaa 5 Referee: Aso Alanso |

| 13 March 2022 | FC Inter M35 (+35) | w/o (1-0) | Kaarinan Palloseura (6) |
| | | Report |

| 6 March 2022 | FC Global (6) | 0-1 | FC Ruskon Pallo (6) | Turku |
| 18:00 | | Report | Tuominen 88' | Stadium: Kupittaa 5 Referee: Einari Sario |

| 26 February 2022 | TuRaKe (6) | 0-1 | Turun Pallokerho (4) | Turku |
| 14:00 | | Report | Silvennoinen 90' | Stadium: Kupittaa 5 Attendance: 30; Referee: Gabriel Anton |

| 5 March 2022 | FC KyPS (7) | 3-2 | Peimari Utd 2 (6) | Paimio |
| 15:00 | Jim. Enberg 30'; Jir. Enberg 67'; Niinimäki 90+1' | Report | Pirhonen 10'; Antunes Justino 89' | Stadium: Soikka; Attendance: 50; Referee: Elvedin Fiso |

| 2 March 2022 | Turun Palloveikot (6) | 0-2 | Lohjan Pallo (5) | Turku |
| 18:00 | | Report | Pajunen 8'; Salminen 68' | Stadium: Kupittaa 5 Attendance: 20; Referee: Gabriel Anton |

| 18 February 2022 | FC Inter 2 (4) | 1-0 | VG-62 (4) | Turku |
| 19:15 | Yrjas 39' | Report | | Stadium: Energia Areena; Attendance: 40; Referee: Tommi Jokela |

| 5 March 2022 | TuKV 2 (6) | 0-4 | Turun Weikot (5) | Turku |
| 18:00 | | Report | Own goal 23'; Korbelainen 35', 70'; Hallgren 40' | Stadium: Kupittaa 5 Referee: Niilo Heikkinen |

| 12 February 2022 | FC HIK (5) | 0-3 | FC Åland (4) | Mariehamn |
| 16:00 | | Report | Sundman 27'; Amani 28'; Hagström 37' | Stadium: Wiklöf Holding Arena; Referee: Adrian Stoia |

| 16 February 2022 | Torre Calcio (7) | 0-4 | AFC Campus (6) | Turku |
| 19:00 | | Report | Eklund 15', 45', 59'; H Härmävaara 40' | Stadium: Kupittaa 5 Attendance: 10; Referee: Niilo Heikkinen |

| 6 March 2022 | Maskun Palloseura (4) | 0-1 | Åbo IFK | Naantali |
| 13:00 | | Report | Palani 78' | Stadium: Karvetti; Attendance: 50; Referee: Joni Hyytiä |

| 13 March 2022 | Qppis (7) | 0-3 | Piikkiön Palloseura (6) | Turku |
| 19:00 | | Report | Kilpeläinen 25'; Rastas 61'; Uusitorppa 81' | Stadium: Kupittaa 5 Referee: Sajjad Zavari |

=== Group 2 ===
| 5 March 2022 | FC Kontu/KoVa (6) | 1-2 | KäPa/NoLe (5) | Helsinki |
| 9:10 | Vikström 73' | Report | Toikka 7'; Rolig 41' | Stadium: Talin jalkapallohalli Attendance: 5 Referee: Elmo Otronen |

| 5 March 2022 | LPS/2 (6) | 0-0 (2-4 p) | Malminkartanon PETO (5) | Vuosaari, Helsinki |
| 19:00 | | Report | | Stadium: Kartano 2 Referee: Antti Kaitasuo |

| 13 March 2022 | FC Honka 3 (5) | w/o (0-3) | FC Espoo (4) |
| | | Report |

| 5 March 2022 | EsPa/Renat (6) | 1-4 | FC Kirkkonummi (4) | Matinkylä, Espoo |
| 19:30 | Ropo 81' | Report | Siekkinen 31'; Turunen 36'; Own goal 44'; Åberg 80' | Stadium: Matinkylän tekonurmi Attendance: 22; Referee: Erdal Muhamedi |

| 6 March 2022 | FC WILD (5) | 0-4 | SexyPöxyt (4) | Nummela |
| 20:00 | | Report | Gardemeister 16'; Kuusisto 62', 83'; Lindfors 67' | Stadium: Certos Areena; Attendance: 58; Referee: Antti Kolehmainen |

| 25 February 2022 | Jokerit FC (6) | 2-6 | AC Rastaala (5) | Helsinki |
| 20:00 | Piippa 70'; Own Goal 75' | Report | Valtonen 6', 47', 55'; Laitinen 40'; Own Goal 50'; Asikainen 80' | Stadium: Töölön Pallokenttä 1 Referee: Joonatan Palviainen |

| 13 March 2022 | SAPA/2 | 0-2 | PPJ/Ruoholahti | Helsinki |
| 19:00 | | Report | Pousi 30'; Ilvessalo 46' | Stadium: Töölön Pallokenttä 6 Referee: Miikka Salminen |

| 25 February 2022 | Pajamäen Pallo-Veikot (6) | 1-8 | Puotinkylän Valtti (4) | Helsinki |
| 20:00 | Ingberg 14' | Report | Okic 15', 36', 43', 57'; Besic 24'; Bio 46', 84'; Vuohtoniemi 54' | Stadium: Töölön Pallokenttä 6 Attendance: 25; Referee: Rasmus Rissanen |

| 13 March 2022 | FC Germania (6) | 0-2 | Puistolan Urheilijat (4) | Helsinki |
| 19:00 | | Report | Lamppu 66', 85' | Stadium: Töölön Pallokenttä 1 Attendance: 50; Referee: Elmo Otronen |

| 11 March 2022 | FC Korso/United (5) | 0-2 | SUMU/sob (5) | Vantaa |
| 20:05 | | Report | Nieminen 27'; Luoma 45' | Stadium: Tikkurilan tekonurmi Referee: Elias Juvonen |

| 11 March 2022 | Helsingin Palloseura (4) | 5-0 | Leppävaaran Pallo (4) | Helsinki |
| 20:00 | Maunula 14'; Puro 27'; Kinnunen 57'; Pirkola 62', 82' | Report | | Stadium: Töölön Pallokenttä 6 Attendance: 58; Referee: Mikko Särkiniemi |

| 18 February 2022 | AC StaSi (7) | 0-15 | EPS/Reservi (4) | Helsinki |
| 20:00 | | Report | Leisma 5', 14', 20', 29', 36', 60'; Viitanen 11'; Seferi Valdrin 16'; Jylhä 31'; Kullaa 40'; Paunio 53', 62', 72', 81'; Koskela 80' | Stadium: Kartano 2 Attendance: 10; Referee: Ville Sirviö |

| 6 March 2022 | AS RaPe (8) | 1-14 | Atlantis FC/Akatemia (4) | Helsinki |
| 19:00 | Pirinen 41' | Report | Pllana 4', 88'; Grujic 9'; Omar 10'; Aryal 30', 45', 77', 82'; Nevala 39'; Etie 44'; Ahmed 47', 74'; Obi-Metzger 57'; Ajunwoko 80' | Stadium: Töölön Pallokenttä 1 Referee: Mohamed Abdelgayed |

| 4 March 2022 | MPS/Atletico Malmi (4) | 2-0 | GrIFK/U23 (4) | Oulunkylä, Helsinki |
| 20:45 | Prami 48'; Myllys 90+2' | Report | | Stadium: Oulunkylä 2 Referee: Gezim Arifi |

| 12 March 2022 | Töölön Vesa (5) | 1-2 | EBK/Reservi (5) | Helsinki |
| 19:00 | Niemelä 33' | Report | Lundsten 12'; Keskitalo 57' | Stadium: Töölön pallokenttä 6 Attendance: 30; Referee: Lucinilton Ferreira |

| 19 February 2022 | Länsiväylän Dynamo (7) | 1-3 | MLHF (6) | Espoo |
| 17:00 | Nikkinen 26' | Report | Kause 21'; Martikainen 36'; Anderson 45+1' | Stadium: Espoonlahti 2 Attendance: 20; Referee: Jonne Kuusniemi |

| 26 February 2022 | KILO IF/1 (7) | 5-3 | Ruila (7) | Espoo |
| 17:30 | Karilahti 11', 33'; Jussila 15', 87'; Väre 41' | Report | Tallqvist 28'; Vierikko 45'; Pitkänen 55' | Stadium: Espoonlahti 2 Referee: Heikki Venhola |

| 4 March 2022 | Kurvin Vauhti (5) | 1-3 | Toukolan Teräs (4) | Helsinki |
| 20:00 | Alamäki 32' | Report | Rämö 30', 55', 87' | Stadium: Töölön Pallokenttä 6 Referee: Lucinilton Ferreira |

| 10 March 2022 | FC POHU/Simpsons (6) | 1-2 | Gnistan M35 (+35) | Helsinki |
| 20:10 | Salminen 24' | Report | Markkanen 6', 63' | Stadium: Oulunkylä 1 Attendance: 30; Referee: Kari Mantere |

=== Group 3 ===
| 8 March 2022 | Helsingin Ponnistus/Peruskallio (7) | 0-9 | PK35/2 (5) | Helsinki |
| 20:15 | | Report | Karjalainen 10'; Ja. Inkinen 31', 37', 47', 82'; Own goal 51'; Forsström 65', 72'; Jy. Inkinen 80' | Stadium: HofS Areena; Attendance: 7 Referee: Olli-Oskari Jaakkola |

| 27 February 2022 | HIFK/3 (7) | 2-5 | TiPS (4) | Helsinki |
| 19:00 | Kandemir 13'; Mikkonen 76' | Report | Haapalehto 8'; Mowlid 17'; Saalfeld 26'; Pyysalo 74'; Ceni 80' | Stadium: Töölön Pallokenttä 1 Referee: Lotta Vuorio |

| 20 February 2022 | GNU M35 (+35) | 0-6 | Helsingin Ponnistus/2 (6) | Oulunkylä, Helsinki |
| 20:15 | | Report | Leppänen 12'; Palovesi 19', 68'; Saari 24'; Päkkilä 27'; Kiisseli 61' | Stadium: Oulunkylän tekonurmi 1 Referee: Lucinilton Ferreira |

| 6 March 2022 | FC Kirkkonummi/3 (7) | 0-2 | PPS/Old Stars (5) | Kirkkonummi |
| 19:00 | | Report | Laukkarinen 41'; Tan 73' | Stadium: Urheilupuisto; Attendance: 5 Referee: Janne Haikari |

| 28 February 2022 | Riipilän Raketti (6) | 0-2 | Malmin Ponnistajat (4) | Myyrmäki, Vantaa |
| 20:15 | | Report | Koskinen 22'; Pujals 78' | Stadium: Myyrmäen jalkapallostadion Referee: Gezim Arifi |

| 11 March 2022 | MPS/Atletico Akatemia (6) | 0-4 | HIFK/2 (4) | Helsinki |
| 20:00 | | Report | Belhouchet 17'; Pekkola 18'; Al-Al-Rubeiyi 69'; Kiema 89' | Stadium: Kartano 2 Referee: Lucinilton Ferreira |

| 13 March 2022 | MLHF/2 (8) | w/o (0-3) | MPS/2020 (4) |
| | | Report |

| 12 March 2022 | LePa/2 (6) | 0-3 | LJS (5) | Espoonlahti, Espoo |
| 17:15 | | Report | Heinonen 13'; Tamper 63'; Tuominen 86' | Stadium: Espoonlahti 2 Attendance: 22; Referee: Niklas Heikkonen |

| 2 March 2022 | FC Kiffen/3 (5) | 0-6 | EsPa (4) | Matinkylä, Espoo |
| 20:00 | | Report | Masar Ömer 7', 48'; Harakka 22'; Appelqvist 40'; Pykälä-Aho 52'; Roivainen 56' | Stadium: Matinkylä 1 Referee: Joonas Kovapohja |

| 8 March 2022 | Gnistan/Ogeli (5) | 2-5 | EBK (4) | Helsinki |
| 20:15 | Vähäkoitti 72'; Forsen 86' | | Istrefi 13', 23'; Syla 30', 44'; Koivulahti 90' | Stadium: Oulunkylä 1 Attendance: 50; Referee: Lucinilton Ferreira |

| 5 March 2022 | Mooseksen Potku (8) | 0-12 | VJS/2 (5) | Helsinki |
| 19:00 | | Report | Laitila 7', 35'; Kainulainen 9'; Parhiala 11'; Kankaro 22'; Koso 28'; Mäensivu 32'; Rautio 50'; Varis 52', 72'; Khan 61', 62' | Stadium: Töölön Pallokenttä 1 Referee: Ibrahim Aksoy |

| 4 March 2022 | FC POHU/JäPa (5) | 1-10 | SAPA (4) | Helsinki |
| 20:00 | Niskanen 69' | Report | Ibrahim 11'; Lillqvist 45', 72'; Unkuri 56'; Lappi 62'; Osongo 64', 74'; Roitto 82', 83', 85' | Stadium: Töölön Pallokenttä 6 Referee: Veli-Matti Leppänen |

| 5 March 2022 | ToTe/Legends (5) | 1-2 | Töölön Taisto (4) | Helsinki |
| 19:00 | Friman 56' | Report | Aardemäe 6'; Ala-Porkkunen 33' | Stadium: Töölön Pallokenttä 6 Referee: Gezim Arifi |

| 11 March 2022 | FC Honka/Leopardit (7) | 1-3 | Kasiysi (6) | Laaksolahti, Espoo |
| 19:00 | Winogradow 79' | Report | Harjunen 22', 77'; Jussila 24' | Stadium: Laaksolahden tekonurmi Attendance: 15; Referee: Ville Sirviö |

| 11 March 2022 | Kurvin Vauhti/Partiz (7) | 1-4 | EPS/I (5) | Helsinki |
| 20:00 | Rekola 80' | Report | Kiiski 29'; Apo 32'; Klingberg 67'; Mahanen 90+3' | Stadium: Töölön Pallokenttä 1 Referee: Gezim Arifi |

| 11 February 2022 | FC Pakila (8) | 1-6 | LePa M35 (+35) | Helsinki |
| 20:00 | Hämäläinen 72' | Report | Hiltunen 24', 33', 54', 80'; Hirvonen 47'; Hori 74' | Stadium: Töölön Pallokenttä 6 Attendance: 16; Referee: Ville Sirviö |

| 19 February 2022 | ToTe/Keparoi (7) | 0-6 | HPS/2 (5) | Helsinki |
| 18:00 | | Report | Piilonen 16'; Olin 33'; Sorvari 50'; Own Goal 68'; Ghribi 81'; Hemiä 82' | Stadium: Sahara; Attendance: 18; Referee: Ville Sirviö |

| 4 March 2022 | FC Kontu (4) | 5-1 | FC FINNKURD (4) | Vuosaari, Helsinki |
| 20:00 | Chu Duc Huy 22', 80'; Zymberi 28'; Nariman 84'; Sallinen 89' | Report | Safdari 20' | Stadium: Kartano; Attendance: 47; Referee: Mikko Särkiniemi |

| 12 March 2022 | LPS/Kuninkaat (6) | 2-4 | Koivukylän Palloseura (4) | Helsinki |
| 10:15 | Strömsten 20', 87' | Report | Chaw 16'; Hakola 82'; Majiid 88'; Nguyen 90+3' | Stadium: Talin Halli; Referee: Riku Tapio |

=== Group 4 ===
| 27 February 2022 | Naseva (7) | 1-11 | JaPS M35 (+35) | Lahti |
| 16:00 | Joentausta 55' | Report | Kinnunen 3', 20', 53'; Mandelin 11', 67'; Iikkanen 26', 27', 48'; Riikonen 31'; Skinnari 73'; Hirvonen 84' | Stadium: Mukkula Halli; Referee: Paul Kirsch |

| 5 March 2022 | FC Villisiat (7) | 1-2 | Ares-86 (6) | Kuusankoski |
| 19:45 | Pulkki 28' | Report | Kolehmainen 41'; Olkkonen 70' | Stadium: Sami Hyypiä Areena; Attendance: 12; Referee: Samu Sievälä |

| 5 March 2022 | Kotajärven Pallo (4) | 0-7 | Riihimäen Palloseura (4) | Lappeenranta |
| 18:00 | | Report | Palomäki 26', 57', 88'; Dyster 34', 90'; Leiponen 83'; Tiilola 90+2' | Stadium: Amis; Attendance: 30; Referee: Jouni Kautonen |

| 5 March 2022 | Askolan Urheilijat (7) | 3-2 | Purha (5) | Kouvola |
| 13:00 | Opoja 83'; Kyyhkynen 83'; Lindberg 83' | Report | Haapaniemi 83'; Korhonen 83' | Stadium: Lehtomäki; Referee: Ari Lyytikkä |

| 26 February 2022 | Jäppärä (6) | 1-10 | KumuJT/Edustus (5) | Lahti |
| 18:30 | Virolainen 90+3' | Report | Jääsmaa 29', 59', 75'; Kukkola 31', 39', 54'; Own Goal 33'; Arima 62', 90+5'; Lindberg 66' | Stadium: Mukkula; Attendance: 26; Referee: Esa Ukkola |

| 27 February 2022 | Karhulan Pojat (7) | 0-11 | JäPS/47 (4) | Kotka |
| 17:00 | | Report | Lainpelto 16'; Kyander 42'; Koivu 44'; Own goal 51', 70'; Uusitalo 57', 88'; Pylkkänen 58'; Järvinen 63'; Mikkonen 68'; Kihl 80' | Stadium: Urheiluhalli; Attendance: 50; Referee: Roope Pynnönen |

| 28 February 2022 | Nopsa (6) | 2-2 (5-3 p) | JäPS/U23 (6) | Nastola |
| 19:00 | Rainikka 5'; Lehtinen 35' | Report | Kahva 4', 90+4' | Stadium: Pajulahti halli Attendance: 15; Referee: Jussi Kinnunen |

| 6 March 2022 | Kellokosken Alku (6) | 1-4 | Kouvolan Jalkapallo (4) | Hyrylä, Tuusula |
| 20:10 | Arponeva 33' | Report | Sippula 46', 84'; Nakari 81', 87' | Stadium: Tuusulan Urheilukeskus; Attendance: 15; Referee: Jarkko Rantanen |

| 6 March 2022 | HAlku/FC (7) | 0-3 | Pakkalan Palloseura (6) | Sipoo |
| 15:15 | | Report | Requena 40'; Lahti 59', 79' | Stadium: Söderkullan tekonurmi Attendance: 30; Referee: Ville Sirviö |

| 26 February 2022 | FC Loviisa (5) | 0-4 | Haminan Pallo-Kissat (4) | Kotka |
| 16:30 | | Report | Lassila 7'; Pietiläinen 27'; Mula 73'; Labbas 82' | Stadium: Arto Tolsa Areena; Attendance: 100; Referee: Turo Veini |

| 26 February 2022 | I-HK (6) | 2-5 | HyPS (5) | Vantaa |
| 13:00 | Kärkkäinen 8', 33' | | Järvimaa 37'; Elmgren 60', 65', 81'; Kumpulainen 70' | Stadium: Myyrmäki Halli; Attendance: 13; Referee: Petteri Järvinen |

| 12 March 2022 | Tuusulan Palloseura (4) | 1-0 | MYPA (4) | Tuusula |
| 15:00 | Halme 84' | Report | | Stadium: Tuusulan urheilukeskus Attendance: 100; Referee: Mikko Lipsanen |

| 12 March 2022 | Virkkalan Tarmo (6) | 1-3 | Jäntevä (5) | Nummela |
| 15:00 | Kärkkäinen 25' | Report | Turkia 8'; Kansa 55'; Marin 61' | Stadium: Certos Areena; Attendance: 30; Referee: Janne Roivas |

| 10 March 2022 | Union Plaani/17 (6) | 0-7 | NouLa (4) | Lahti |
| 20:45 | | Report | Mohamed 3'; Korpela 71', 72', 90'; Kivikoski 76'; Laakso 79'; Halonen 89' | Stadium: Mukkula Halli; Attendance: 6 Referee: Anssi Juurinen |

| 11 March 2022 | LAUTP (6) | 2-2 (7-6 p) | Union Plaani (4) | Lappeenranta |
| 19:30 | Rantalainen 10'; Turppo 90+2' | Report | Rantanen 50'; Kaukonen 86' | Stadium: Amis; Attendance: 40; Referee: Remi Rantakaulio |

| 19 February 2022 | Pallo-Peikot (7) | 1-17 | Imatran Palloseura (4) | Kuusankoski |
| 20:00 | Martinez 86' | Report | J Reponen 2', 6', 23', 33', 71'; Kurkisuo 4', 79', 90'; Metsi 10'; Könönen 15', 42'; K Reponen 16'; Finer 31'; Prior 54', 81', 84'; Belimov 60' | Stadium: Sami Hyypiä Areena; Attendance: 8 Referee: Roope Pynnönen |

| 20 February 2022 | KoiPS/Dynamo (6) | 1-6 | Kultsu FC (4) | Tikkurila |
| 12:00 | Koivisto 82' | Report | Lötjönen 12', 41', 62', 69'; Vauhkonen 23'; Abubakar 67' | Stadium: Tikkurila; Attendance: 20; Referee: Ville Sirviö |

=== Group 5 ===
| 12 March 2022 | Fish United (7) | w/o (3-0) | Tervakosken Pato (5) |
| | | Report |

| 13 March 2022 | Viialan Peli-Veikot (6) | 0-15 | Tampereen Pallo-Veikot (4) | Tampere |
| 12:45 | | Report | Lehti 5', 19', 29', 32', 34'; Mbachu 26'; Kinnunen 33'; Koroma 39'; Tuomi 47', 74'; Merikoski 63'; Keronen 67', 68', 79'; Solano 84' | Stadium: Pirkkahalli; Attendance: 52; Referee: Ilpo Lehtimäki |

| 19 February 2022 | Ylöjärvi United FC (6) | 0-12 | Pallo-Iirot (4) | Tampere |
| 17:00 | | Report | Elias Ahde 4', 26', 63'; Jalkanen 29', 30', 34'; Halminen 37'; Schultz 42'; Ketola 75'; Honkaniemi 84'; Repo 85', 89' | Stadium: Kauppi 1 Referee: Kasper Halonen |

| 12 March 2022 | Harjavallan Pallo (6) | 1-3 | PP-70 (4) | Pori |
| 19:15 | Miettinen 45' | Report | Sipiläinen 63'; Iso-Mustajärvi 79', 90' | Stadium: Urheilukeskus; Referee: Ville Männistö |

| 13 March 2022 | FC Haka-j/Musta (7) | 2-5 | Oriveden Tuisku (7) | Valkeakoski |
| 18:00 | Jäärvinen 1', 48' | Report | Koskinen 30'; Pitkäkoski 32', 70'; Saramäki 37', 90+3' | Stadium: Palloiluhalli; Referee: Ahti Vuorinen |

| 6 March 2022 | FC Kangasala (6) | 2-1 | Tampereen Palloilijat (5) | Tampere |
| 16:00 | Lehtola 49', 66' | Report | Paukamainen 60' | Stadium: Kauppi 1 Attendance: 150; Referee: Janne Laukkala |

| 6 March 2022 | Tampere United/2 (4) | 2-2 (6-5 p) | ACE (4) | Tampere |
| 20:00 | Väliaho 31'; Vähänen 39' | Report | Sipola 60'; Kallio 73' | Stadium: Pirkkahalli; Attendance: 45; Referee: Ville Kokkinen |

| 13 March 2022 | FC Vapsi (7) | 1-6 | Toijalan Pallo-49 (5) | Tampere |
| 19:15 | Kuukka 47' | Report | V. Sormunen 17'; Järvi 31'; A.Sormunen 62', 67'; Laajoki 69'; Tromstedt 81' | Stadium: Kauppi 1 Referee: Aleksi Keronen |

| 5 March 2022 | Pispalan Ponnistus-79 (6) | 0-3 | Toejoen Veikot (4) | Tampere |
| 13:00 | | Report | Riihimäki 18'; Own goal 40'; Koivisto 42' | Stadium: Kauppi 1 Referee: Niklas Helenius |

| 12 March 2022 | Tyrwään Palloseuran (8) | 1-2 | Porin Palloilijat (6) | Tampere |
| 13:00 | Ellonen 16' | Report | Leppänen 44'; Haapala 78' | Stadium: Kauppi 1 Attendance: 5 Referee: Henrik Sandmark |

| 6 March 2022 | Ilves/4 (6) | 1-4 | FC Haka-j (4) | Tampere |
| 18:00 | Jusu Karvonen 31' | Report | Al Feily 8', 38'; Molin 80'; Orrenmaa 88' | Stadium: Kauppi 1 Referee: Aleksi Keronen |

| 13 March 2022 | P-Iirot/2 (5) | 1-1 (4-5 p) | Sääksjärven Loiske (4) | Rauma |
| 16:00 | Mäntyharju 52' | Report | Huvinen 45' | Stadium: Äijänsuon stadion Referee: Vesa Saarinen |

| 5 March 2022 | SOHO SS (8) | 0-5 | Ilves/3 (8) | Tampere |
| 17:00 | | Report | Suoninen 6', 90'; Feliz Reyes 18', 33', 47' | Stadium: Kauppi 1 Referee: Juha Franssila |

| 6 March 2022 | Vesilahden Visa (5) | 0-2 | FC Eurajoki (5) | Tampere |
| 14:00 | | Report | Viitasalo 5'; Ojala 61' | Stadium: Kauppi 1 Referee: Aleksi Keronen |

| 13 March 2022 | Lauttakylän Luja (7) | 0-10 | LaVe/KPR (7) | Tampere |
| 16:00 | | Report | A. Aakkula 10', 15', 45', 52', 80'; Milosevic 21'; Dampha 63'; Perälä 72'; R. Aakkula 75', 87' | Stadium: Kauppi 1 Attendance: 10; Referee: Niko Parviainen |

| 5 March 2022 | FC Helmi Jätkä (8) | 3-3 (5-3 p) | FC Eurajoki/2 (7) | Tampere |
| 15:00 | Ollgren 10'; Kivekäs 66'; Tuominen 85' | Report | Henriksson 12', 52'; Lehikoinen 27' | Stadium: Kauppi 1 Referee: Kasper Halonen |

| 10 March 2022 | FC Melody (4) | 0-6 | NoPS (4) | Tampere |
| 20:00 | | Report | Kausiala 40'; Varhi 50', 54'; Äijälä 51'; Alanen 58'; Maunuksela 86' | Stadium: Kauppi 3 Attendance: 30; Referee: Tuukka Virtanen |

=== Group 6 ===
| 4 March 2022 | RyPK-84 (6) | 1-5 | Sundom IF (4) | Kokkola |
| 20:00 | Kovalainen 45' | Report | Kadic 39', 89'; Kankaanpää 46', 65'; Geisor 78' | Stadium: Kipparihalli; Attendance: 30; Referee: Tony Mäki |

| 11 March 2022 | Alavuden Peli-Veikot (7) | 0-4 | FC KOMU (6) | Kuortane |
| 20:15 | | Report | Guya 15', 50', 84', 87' | Stadium: Urheiluopiston palloiluhalli Attendance: 10; Referee: Aapo Saarijärvi |

| 5 March 2022 | Lapuan Virkiä (5) | 0-3 | SJK-j (4) | Kuortane |
| 14:00 | | Report | Kuivalainen 41'; Nyrhinen 71', 90' | Stadium: Urheiluopiston Palloiluhalli; Attendance: 50; Referee: Joona Haapa-Aho |

| 18 February 2022 | FC Ylivieska/2 (7) | 0-6 | SJK-j Apollo (7) | Kokkola |
| 20:30 | | Report | Järvinen 4'; Muurimäki 12', 62'; Seppälä 43'; Siikala 78'; Sund 78' | Stadium: Kipparihalli; Attendance: 3 Referee: Pasi Tuurinmaa |

| 5 March 2022 | Seinäjoen Sisu (6) | 1-1 (4-5 p) | Akademisk Ball Club (5) | Seinäjoki |
| 20:15 | Ruokamo 78' | Report | Snåre 78' | Stadium: Wallsport-Areena; Attendance: 52; Referee: Topi Luoma |

| 12 March 2022 | Hyllykallion Myrsky (7) | 1-11 | Kokkolan Palloseura (6) | Seinäjoki |
| 20:00 | Puntala 53' | Report | Hinkkanen 4'; Jo. Hakasalo 22'; Bweasay 34', 75'; Lindberg 48', 59'; Karppi 68'; Ju. Hakasalo 70', 89'; Sokolov 82'; Kangasvieri 90' | Stadium: WallSport-Areena; Attendance: 5 Referee: Topi Luoma |

| 7 March 2022 | Lapuan Ponnistus -90 (6) | w/o (0-3) | Sääripotku (5) |
| | | Report |

| 5 March 2022 | KJV/Kanu (7) | 1-9 | Black Eagles (6) | Lapua |
| 18:00 | Liias 66' | Report | Syla 4', 20', 88'; Pipa 18'; Egzon 37'; Häggblom 46'; Ruka 62'; Kera 73'; Miftari 75' | Stadium: Patruuna Areena; Referee: Jalo Oja |

| 26 February 2022 | Ilmajoen Kisailijat (5) | 0-6 | FC Kiisto (4) | Seinäjoki |
| 20:30 | | Report | Maki 13', 29'; Vedenjuoksu 16'; Antila 28'; Muurimäki 63'; Jääskä 74' | Stadium: Wallsport Arena; Attendance: 50; Referee: Joona Haapa-Aho |

=== Group 7 ===
| 26 February 2022 | FC Saarijärvi (7) | 4-1 | Konneveden Urheilijat (7) | Äänekoski |
| 19:00 | Ee Hautanen 10'; Väliketo 20'; Lehtonen 35', 85' | Report | Norontaus 40' | Stadium: Ylipainehalli; Attendance: 40; Referee: Jukka Petteri Heimonen |

| 5 March 2022 | FCV/Reds (7) | 1-6 | AFC Keltik (5) | Jyväskylä |
| 15:10 | Peltola 42' | Report | Nas 12', 19', 40', 86', 90+1'; Ryynänen 23' | Stadium: Vehkahalli; Referee: Rurik Osola |

| 12 February 2022 | Keuruun Pallo (4) | 0-2 | JPS (4) | Äänekoski |
| 17:45 | | Report | Rintatalo 32', 83' | Stadium: Ylipainehalli; Attendance: 20; Referee: Jani Laaksonen |

| 27 February 2022 | KeuPa/2 (7) | 0-5 | SC Riverball (4) | Äänekoski |
| 19:00 | | Report | Naakka 6'; Own goal 8'; Ilodigwe 23'; Hirvonen 52'; Ilvonen 84' | Stadium: Ylipainehalli; Attendance: 5 Referee: Henri Tiensuu |

| 5 March 2022 | KaDy/2 (6) | 1-3 | Blue Eyes Team (5) | Jyväskylä |
| 17:15 | Sakhizada 81' | Report | Valtanen 15'; Azimi 39'; Nousiainen 70' | Stadium: Vehkahalli; Attendance: 11; Referee: Aki Oinonen |

| 6 March 2022 | Inter Jyväskylä (7) | 0-6 | Niemisen Urheilijat (5) | Jyväskylä |
| 13:00 | | Report | Simanainen 30'; Ruotsalainen 33'; Heikkinen 45+1'; Jakobsson 57'; Levy 62'; Naakka 71' | Stadium: Vehkalampi; Attendance: 10; Referee: Aki Bågman |

| 19 February 2022 | Ylämyllyn Yllätys (6) | 7-2 | Petäjäveden Petäjäiset (6) | Joensuu |
| 19:00 | Pietarinen 12', 56'; Alsio 37', 49'; Tuomela 74'; Piitulainen 84'; Sippola 85' | Report | S Paltamaa 21', 32' | Stadium: Rantakylän Liikuntahalli; Attendance: 25; Referee: Jooa Itämäki |

| 26 February 2022 | KAJO (5) | 1-1 (4-5 p) | Huima/Urho (5) | Kouvola |
| 15:00 | Metsä-Ketelä 69' | Report | Terho 44' | Stadium: Lehtomäki; Attendance: 20; Referee: Paul Kirsch |

| 20 February 2022 | Harjun Potku (6) | 3-1 | FC Soho (6) | Jyväskylä |
| 13:00 | Rousu 68'; J Salminen 77'; Komppa 78' | Report | Peltonen 45' | Stadium: Vehkalampi; Attendance: 20; Referee: Mikko Lehtola |

=== Group 8 ===
| 19 February 2022 | STPS (6) | 0-8 | Kuopion Elo (4) | Kuopio |
| 18:30 | | Report | O Eskelinen 11', 45+1'; Lipponen 20'; Berg 36'; Haaranen 42'; Heiskanen 50', 75'; A Eskelinen 77' | Stadium: Lippumäki; Attendance: 27; Referee: Joni Kortelainen |

| 26 February 2022 | FC Tarzan (6) | 0-7 | PK-37 (4) | Kuopio |
| 17:30 | | Report | Tenhunen 10'; Norring 25', 63'; Lyyra 32'; Riihola 66', 90+3'; R Lappalainen 85' | Stadium: Lippumäki; Attendance: 49; Referee: Sasu Rissanen |

| 26 February 2022 | Kajaanin Palloilijat (6) | 3-0 | Kuopion Jalkapallokerho (5) | Kajaani |
| 19:30 | Fawal 14'; Milunovic 48'; Sabbagh 73' | Report | | Stadium: Pallohalli; Attendance: 50; Referee: Heikki Ikonen |

| 5 March 2022 | Savon Pallo (4) | 0-2 | RPS Lions (4) | Imatra |
| 15:30 | | Report | Ahola 5'; Own goal 32' | Stadium: Ukonniemi Areena; Attendance: 46; Referee: Niko Rantalainen |

| 12 February 2022 | Puijon Pallo M35 (+35) | w/o (3-0) | Warkaus JK (4) |
| 18:30 | | Report |

| 27 February 2022 | SiPS (6) | 0-8 | AC BARCA (4) | Kuopio |
| 20:00 | | Report | Rinta-Halkola 15'; Venäläinen 22', 29'; J Korhonen 39'; Ville Saxman 42'; Virta 62'; Samba 75'; Own goal 78' | Stadium: Lippumäki; Attendance: 22; Referee: Miika Pahkala |

=== Group 9 ===
| 25 February 2022 | KemPa (6) | 0-2 | Puleward City (5) | Oulu |
| 20:45 | | Report | S Koskela 57', 65' | Stadium: Garam Masala Areena; Attendance: 20; Referee: Veikka Marttila |

| 26 February 2022 | FC Santa Claus (6) | 2-6 | Tervarit (4) | Rovaniemi |
| 17:00 | Leskelä 35'; Halili 87' | Report | Komu 14'; Korkala 50', 60', 69'; Ervasti 67'; Patrikka 74' | Stadium: Ounashalli; Attendance: 120; Referee: Samu Korkalainen |

| 20 February 2022 | Kolarin Kontio (6) | 1-15 | TP-47 (4) | Rovaniemi |
| 14:15 | Ravelin 90' | Report | Eskelinen 4', 19', 21', 72'; Isomäki 16', 28', 54'; Ville Moilanen 27', 31'; Kerkelä 33'; Alamäki 45'; Erkinmikko 46'; Liimatta 78'; Wiena 83'; AlaVahtola 85' | Stadium: Ounashalli; Attendance: 20; Referee: Tuomas Pyhäjärvi |

| 20 February 2022 | Villan Pojat (5) | 0-5 | Roi Utd (4) | Oulu |
| 16:00 | | Report | J Hakala 45', 68', 70', 84'; Paukku 90' | Stadium: Heinäpää; Attendance: 40; Referee: Eemil Hietakangas |

| 27 February 2022 | OuJK (6) | 1-0 | Kemin Palloseura (4) | Oulu |
| 13:00 | Puurunen 67' | Report | | Stadium: Heinäpää; Attendance: 20; Referee: Timi Kärki |

== Second round ==
116 winners from first round participate in this round. Winners advance to third round.

Number of teams per tier still in competition
| Veikkausliiga (1) | Ykkönen (2) | Kakkonen (3) | Kolmonen (4) | Nelonen (5) | Vitonen (6) | Kutonen (7) | Seiska (8) | M35 (+35) | Total |
|---|---|---|---|---|---|---|---|---|---|
| 12 / 12 | 12 / 12 | 32 / 32 | 51 / 67 | 28 / 58 | 19 / 69 | 11 / 47 | 2 / 9 | 6 / 8 | 172 / 314 |

=== Group 1 ===
| 30 March 2022 | Piikkiön Palloseura (6) | 0-0 (4-2 p) | AFC Campus (6) | Piikkiö |
| 19:30 | | Report | | Stadium: POP-Areena; Referee: Marios Steliou |

| 3 April 2022 | FC Kyrön Palloseura (7) | 2-2 (3-5 p) | FC Inter M35 (+35) | Turku |
| 18:00 | Ville Hiekkamäki 8'; Niklas Maanpää 43' | Report | Mika Hemmilä 53', 72' | Stadium: Turku Energia Areena; Attendance: 52; Referee: Einari Sario |

| 20 March 2022 | Turun Weikot (5) | 1-5 | FC Åland (4) | Turku |
| 17:00 | Sami Eloneva 46' | Report | Joel Karlström 6'; Jimmy Sundman 13', 59'; Daniel Boman 44', 90' | Stadium: Kupittaan liikuntakeskus 5 Referee: Aso Alanso |

| 30 March 2022 | Turun Palloseura M35 (+35) | 5-1 | Sporting Club Wolves (5) | Turku |
| 19:15 | Antti Hakala 8', 26', 50', 55'; Mika Ääritalo 22' | Report | Milliam Ahanen 89' | Stadium: Kupittaan liikuntapuisto 5 Attendance: 35; Referee: Ari-Petteri Finnberg |

| 26 March 2022 | Nummelan Palloseura (5) | 0-2 | Turun Pallokerho (4) | Nummela, Vihti |
| 18:15 | | Report | Jaakko Teräsranta 24'; Andre Zaya 33' | Stadium: Certos Areena; Attendance: 608; Referee: Gezim Arifi |

| 1 April 2022 | FC Ruskon Pallo (6) | 1-10 | Åbo IFK (4) | Rusko |
| 18:30 | Jonatan Javanainen 71' | Report | Rasmus Rantanen 5'; Alex Ålgars 18', 23', 58', 65'; Jeremias Kaari 55', 69', 87'; Elias Untamala 75'; Shroosh Ahmad Alimi 80' | Stadium: Ruskon tekonurmi Attendance: 25; Referee: Onni-Kalle Ojanen |

| 2 April 2022 | LaVe/KPR (7) | 0-7 | FC Inter 2 (4) | Hämeenlinna |
| 16:00 | | Report | Jarkko Kokkala 42', 49', 66'; Elmeri Oksanen 56'; Mohammed Bakkar 76'; Jasper Yrjas 83'; Matias Suotunen 87' | Stadium: Säästöpankki-areena; Attendance: 10; Referee: Jukka Järvinen |

| 31 March 2022 | Lohjan Pallo (5) | 1-3 | Jyrkkälän Tykit (5) | Ingå |
| 19:00 | Veeti Lemberg 64' | Report | Hannu Kuusisto 70', 88'; Salim Goucham 87' | Stadium: Ingå arena Referee: Mikko Särkiniemi |

=== Group 2 ===
| 3 April 2022 | PPS/Old Stars (5) | 2-6 | Helsingin Palloseura (4) | Myyrmäki, Vantaa |
| 14:00 | Amir Raci 66'; Mikko Hyppölä 71' | Report | Eero Puro 11', 22', 51'; Aaro Törnblom 68', 87', 90+3' | Stadium: Myyrmäen jalkapallostadion Referee: Juuso Vuorinen |

| 3 April 2022 | Etelä-Espoon Pallo (4) | 4-1 | SAPA (4) | Matinkylä, Espoo |
| 12:00 | Masar Ömer 35'; Daniel Harakka 51'; Ville Teräsranta 71'; Yasine Aloui 81' | Report | Ahmedjasin Ibrahim 74' | Stadium: Matinkylän urheilupuisto 1 Attendance: 110; Referee: Mikko Särkiniemi |

| 2 April 2022 | EPS/Reservi (4) | 4-0 | FC Kontu (4) | Espoonlahti, Espoo |
| 17:00 | Ilmari Jylhä 8'; Aarne Leisma 14'; Aleksi Wahlman 57'; Rasmus Viitanen 80' | Report | | Stadium: Espoonlahden urheilupuisto 2 Referee: Emil Kohvakka |

| 25 March 2022 | Helsingin Ponnistus/2 (6) | 0-7 | Koivukylän Palloseura (4) | Helsinki |
| 19:15 | | Report | Matias Kaihlavirta 4'; Aleksi Tarkiainen 8', 67'; Luukas Hakola 16', 47'; Osku Mikkonen 21'; Own goal 35' | Stadium: Töölön Pallokenttä 1 Attendance: 20; Referee: Elmo Otronen |

| 27 March 2022 | Atlantis FC/Akatemia (4) | 4-1 | MPS/2020 (4) | Pitäjänmäki, Helsinki |
| 14:30 | Amit Aryal 21', 27'; Mohammed Bekhedda 81'; Joao Pedro Costa Do Espirito Santo 85' | Report | Markus Tukiainen 68' | Stadium: Talin halli Referee: Mikko Mörö |

| 1 April 2022 | Töölön Taisto (4) | 0-0 (2-4 p) | SexyPöxyt (4) | Helsinki |
| 20:00 | | Report | | Stadium: Töölön Pallokenttä 1 Attendance: 50; Referee: Henrik Seikku |

| 25 March 2022 | FC Kirkkonummi (4) | 0-3 | Malmin Ponnistajat (4) | Kirkkonummi |
| 19:30 | | Report | Joel Tuovinen 7'; Markus Silvennoinen 34'; Leevi Lehkosuo 65' | Stadium: Kirkkonummen keskusurheilupuiston tekonurmi Attendance: 48; Referee: Kim Junna |

| 28 March 2022 | Esbo Bollklubb (4) | 4-4 (3-4 p) | Tikkurilan Palloseura (4) | Espoon Keskus, Espoo |
| 19:00 | Rinor Karaca 14'; Fatos Syla 33'; Arber Istrefi 34'; Joona Salmi 55' | Report | Miika Hyvärinen 23'; Ismail Hassan 58', 75'; Joni Murtomaa 90' | Stadium: Keski-Espoon urheilupuisto 2 Referee: Veli-Matti Leppänen |

| 23 March 2022 | Laaksolahden Jalkapalloseura (5) | 1-0 | Malminkartanon PETO (5) | Laaksolahti, Espoo |
| 20:30 | Aleksi Aso 68' | Report | | Stadium: Laaksolahden tekonurmi Attendance: 6 Referee: Niklas Heikkonen |

| 1 April 2022 | Puistolan Urheilijat (4) | 2-3 | HIFK/2 (4) | Helsinki |
| 20:00 | Teemu Lamppu 24'; Ilmari Tiainen 28' | Report | Mehmet Gökcil 40'; Niilo Pekkola 80'; Mikael Tujulin 88' | Stadium: Töölön Pallokenttä 1 Attendance: 20; Referee: Henri Ojaelehto |

| 31 March 2022 | VJS/2 (5) | 1-0 | HPS/2 (5) | Vantaa |
| 20:30 | Kaarle Kainulainen 61' | Report | | Stadium: Aktia Areena; Referee: Mikko Mörö |

| 29 March 2022 | Kilo IF (7) | 0-2 | MPS/Atletico Malmi (4) | Oulunkylä, Helsinki |
| 21:05 | | Report | Oliver Sahlberg ??'; Juuso Ollila 80' | Stadium: Oulunkylän liikuntapuisto 2 Referee: Miika Salminen |

| 25 March 2022 | AC Rastaala (5) | 1-5 | Puotinkylän Valtti (4) | Laaksolahti, Espoo |
| 20:00 | | Report | | Stadium: Laaksolahden tekonurmi |

| 2 April 2022 | EPS/I (5) | 5-2 | PPJ/Ruoholahti (5) | Espoonlahti, Espoo |
| 19:15 | | Report | | Stadium: Espoonlahden urheilupuisto 2 |

| 1 April 2022 | MLHF (6) | 2-3 | SUMU/sob (5) | Vuosaari, Helsinki |
| 20:00 | Nooa Sjöstedt 74'; Felix Anderson 87' | Report | Daniel Velikainen 36'; Emil Njuschin 42'; Vertti Nieminen 78' | Stadium: Kartanon tekonurmi 2 Attendance: 40; Referee: Markus Junkkari |

| 27 March 2022 | EBK/Reservi (5) | 1-7 | Toukolan Teräs (4) | Espoon keskus, Espoo |
| 19:00 | Mikael Lundsten 13' | Report | Moses Kumah 5'; Joona Rämö 24', 29', 31', 59', 61'; Ilmari Olin 55' | Stadium: Keski-Espoon urheilupuisto 2 Referee: Henri Ojalehto |

| 3 April 2022 | KäPa/NoLe (5) | 0-11 | FC Espoo (4) | Vallila, Helsinki |
| 20:00 | | Report | Aku Haajanen 3', 25', 33'; Samir Shkreli 19'; Samuel Yeboah 32'; Max Lie 41', 56'; Albert Msambya 44'; Tuomas Loukojärvi 74'; Veerti Nieminen 87'; Esron Rwamycyo 89' | Stadium: Kumpulan Campus; Attendance: 30; Referee: Gezim Arifi |

| 2 April 2022 | LePa/M35 (+35) | 0-1 | PK-35/2 (5) | Espoon Keskus, Espoo |
| 16:05 | | Report | Jami-Petteri Inkinen 90+1' | Stadium: Keski-Espoon urheilupuisto 2 Referee: Jesse Aalto |

| 30 March 2022 | Gnistan/M35 (+35) | 6-0 | Kasiysi (6) | Oulunkylä, Helsinki |
| 20:10 | Samuli Markkanen 7', 44', 48'; Pekka Sihvola 37', 57', 86' | Report | | Stadium: Oulunkylän liikuntapuisto 1 Attendance: 30; Referee: Mikko Särkiniemi |

=== Group 3 ===
| 19 March 2022 | Askolan Urheilijat (7) | 1-7 | Imatran Palloseura (4) | Imatra |
| 16:00 | Matti Hautala 45' | Report | Simo Kurkisuo 17'; Eetu Könönen 26'; Jere Ahtiainen 48'; Kalle Reponen 62', 66', 69'; Boris Belimov 88' | Stadium: Ukonniemi-Areena; Attendance: 62; Referee: Niko Rantalainen |

| 25 March 2022 | Hyvinkään Palloseura (5) | 4-0 | Riihimäen Palloseura (4) | Hyvinkää |
| 18:30 | Otso Järvimaa 43', 54'; Esa Palomäki 70'; Nicholas Mphande 88' | Report | | Stadium: Kankurin tekonurmi Attendance: 253; Referee: Joonas Kovapohja |

| 26 March 2022 | Huima/Urho (5) | 1-3 | Tuusulan Palloseura (4) | Äänekoski |
| 16:00 | Riku Rautiainen 49' | Report | Taneli Pitkänen 27'; Eelis Simpson 42'; Joona Tiira 77' | Stadium: Keskuskenttä; Attendance: 120; Referee: Kalle Nummela |

| 20 March 2022 | Nastolan Nopsa (6) | 0-6 | Kouvolan Jalkapallo (4) | Lahti |
| 12:00 | | Report | Niko Nakari 8'; Otto Haimi 16'; Jere Sjögren 26'; Aaro Harju 72', 77'; Oskari Nurminen 88' | Stadium: Kisapuisto 1 Attendance: 50; Referee: Markku Isoherranen |

| 26 March 2022 | Ares -86 (6) | 0-7 | Kotkan Jäntevä (5) | Hyvinkää |
| 17:30 | | Report | Niklas Kansa 2'; Petja Marin 22'; Oliver Kansa 23', 63'; Onni Heijari 41', 79'; Julius Sorsa 49' | Stadium: Kankurin liikuntapuisto Attendance: 9 Referee: Aki Tauriainen |

| 26 March 2022 | Nouseva Laaka (4) | 4-1 | Kultsu FC (4) | Hyrylä, Tuusula |
| 18:00 | Jere Korpela 41'; Olli Honkavirta 44'; Tommi Koivisto 55'; Jani Kaunisto 82' | Report | Eetu Karvinen 8' | Stadium: Tuusulan Urheilukeskus; Attendance: 20; Referee: Mikko Leino |

| 27 March 2022 | Jalkarannan Palloseura/M35 (+35) | 9-2 | Kumu Junior Team (5) | Lahti |
| 16:00 | Olli Riikonen 19'; Drilon Shala 30', 39', 56'; Tero Kinnunen 34'; Konsta Hietanen 45+2', 63'; Esa Riikonen 88'; Harri Kauppinen 90+1' | Report | Pyry Jääsmaa 49'; Iisak Inkilä 86' | Stadium: Mukkulan Halli; Attendance: 94; Referee: Anssi Juurinen |

| 27 March 2022 | LAUTP (6) | 6-0 | Pakkalan Palloseura (6) | Lappeenranta |
| 14:45 | Samu Rantalainen 12'; Elias Lattu 29', 68'; Topias Vitikainen 64'; Joona Väisänen 70'; Misa Puhakainen 79' | Report | | Stadium: Amiksen tekonurmi Attendance: 100; Referee: Remi Rantakaulio |

| 27 March 2022 | Haminan Pallo-Kissat (4) | 4-2 | JäPS/47 (4) | Kotka |
| 17:00 | Kimi Kolsi 10'; Nico Pietiläinen 45'; Lennart Voikar 74'; Jean-William Kuva 90+6' | Report | Ken Kuusisto 5'; Kalle Kurittu 14' | Stadium: Arto Tolsa Areena; Attendance: 100; Referee: Turo Veini |

=== Group 4 ===
| 3 April 2022 | Fish United (7) | 0-7 | FC Haka juniorit (4) | Tampere |
| 19:00 | | Report | Valto Välimäki 22'; Dani Molin 28', 35', 47'; Konsta Mervelä 40'; Alex Santos 41'; Thomas Saarinen 73' | Stadium: Kaupin urheilupuisto 2 Referee: Aleksi Keronen |

| 27 March 2022 | Ilves/3 (8) | 6-2 | FC Kangasala (6) | Tampere |
| 19:30 | Juan Manuel Feliz Reyes 31', 65', 78'; Väinö Juntunen 39'; Tommi Pöntys 66'; Teo Tommola 89' | Report | Akseli Palmu 15'; Jussi Juurikivi 90' | Stadium: Kaupin urheilupuisto 1 Referee: Juha Kivistö |

| 26 March 2022 | Porin Palloilijat (6) | 0-1 | Toejoen Veikot (4) | Pori |
| 12:15 | | Report | Kalle Marttila 78' | Stadium: Urheilukeskus; Attendance: 1 Referee: Henrik Grönblom |

| 2 April 2022 | FC Helmi Jätkä (8) | 0-8 | Pallo-Iirot (4) | Tampere |
| 09:00 | | Report | Sulo Ketola 21', 87'; Aleksi Toivonen 28'; Aleksi Leppänen 30', 44'; Topias Silvennoinen 43'; Elias Ahde 78'; Own goal 89' | Stadium: Kaupin urheilupuisto 3 Attendance: 15; Referee: Aleksi Keronen |

| 28 March 2022 | Oriveden Tuisku (7) | 1-5 | Tampere United/2 (4) | Tampere |
| 20:30 | Joni Rosenblad 29' | Report | Iikka Häkkinen 43'; Panu Väliaho 47', 72'; Olli Kulmala 63'; Alizada Farhad 78' | Stadium: Kaupin urheilupuisto 3 Referee: Aleksi Keronen |

| 30 March 2022 | Tampereen Peli-Pojat-70 (4) | 0-3 | Nokian Palloseura (4) | Tampere |
| 20:00 | | Report | Pekka Äijälä 28'; Rike Kausiala 38'; Samu Jokela 51' | Stadium: Kaupin urheilukeskus 3 Referee: Aleksi Keronen |

| 3 April 2022 | Toijalan Pallo-49 (5) | 2-3 | FC Eurajoki (5) | Tampere |
| 09:45 | Jesse Järvi 47'; Akseli Sormunen 56' | Report | Kristian Gustafsson 15'; Juuso Huurunen 39', 79' | Stadium: Kaupin urheilupuisto 2 Attendance: 8 Referee: Ville Männikkö |

| 27 March 2022 | Sääksjärven Loiske (4) | 0-14 | Tampereen Pallo-Veikot (4) | Valkeakoski |
| 17:15 | | Report | Mohamed Koroma 11'; Juho Mattila 14'; Tino Keväänranta 27', 37'; Tuomas Lehti 48', 53', 59'; Emenike Uchenna Mbachu 52'; Lauri Merikoski 64'; Otto Keronen 68', 84'; Roope Tuomi 70', 88'; Nils Strömsholm 85' | Stadium: Valkeakosken Palloiluhalli; Attendance: 35; Referee: Ville Erkkilä |

=== Group 5 ===
| 20 March 2022 | SJK-j Apollo (7) | 5-1 | Sääripotku (5) | Seinäjoki |
| 20:00 | Jyri Hietaharju 2'; Tommi Haanpää 10', 79', 87'; Mikael Muurimäki 59' | Report | Lawrence Smith 61' | Stadium: Wallsport-Areena; Attendance: 750; Referee: Olli-Jussi Sariola |

| 30 March 2022 | Akademisk Boll Club (5) | 3-4 | Sundom Idrottsförening (4) | Vaasa |
| 19:00 | Niko Sved 9', 57'; Frans Villanen 90' | Report | Alexander Kronholm 7'; Richard Dorman 18'; Bekir Kadic 49'; Own goal 87' | Stadium: Elisa Stadion; Referee: Niko Jokinen |

| 1 April 2022 | Kokkolan Palloseura (6) | 1-1 (8-7 p) | Seinäjoen Jalkapallokerho-juniorit (4) | Kokkola |
| 20:00 | Aleksi Kangasvieri 89' | Report | Joona Lautamaja 51' | Stadium: Kipparihalli; Attendance: 50; Referee: Janne Vehniä |

| 1 April 2022 | FC KOMU (6) | 0-4 | FC Kiisto (4) | Vaasa |
| 20:00 | | Report | Ossi Katajamäki 35'; Akseli Lehtimäki 62', 90'; Mustafa Maki 75' | Stadium: Nya Ehnvallen; Attendance: 40; Referee: Johan Mäntymäki |

=== Group 6 ===
| 3 April 2022 | Niemisen Urheilijat (5) | 1-0 | AFC Keltik (5) | Ylämylly, Liperi |
| 15:00 | Roni Laukkanen 26' | Report | | Stadium: Paloaukean tekonurmi Attendance: 65; Referee: Ilpo Simonen |

| 25 March 2022 | Harjun Potku (6) | 2-3 | SC Riverball (4) | Jyväskylä |
| 19:50 | Pekka Rousu 45'; Toni Kauppinen 54' | Report | Eetu Toikka 65'; Vladislav Dirgin 68'; Eemi Porento 89' | Stadium: Vehkalammen tekonurmi Attendance: 10; Referee: Kalle Nummela |

| 2 April 2022 | Ylämyllyn Yllätys (6) | 1-3 | Blue Eyes Team (5) | Ylämylly, Liperi |
| 15:00 | Reima Alsio 63' | Report | Simo Korpela 30'; Topi Kanerva 43'; Timo Nousiainen 86' | Stadium: Paloaukean tekonurmi Attendance: 60; Referee: Ilpo Simonen |

| 25 March 2022 | FC Saarijärvi (7) | 0-1 | Jyväskylän Seudun Palloseura (4) | Äänekoski |
| 20:15 | | Report | Samuel Arponen 48' | Stadium: Ylipainehalli; Referee: Juha Rantanen |

=== Group 7 ===
| 26 March 2022 | Kajaanin Palloilijat (6) | 4-0 | Ruokolahden Palloseura Lions (4) | Kajaani |
| 15:15 | Own goal 38'; Mustafa Fawal 51'; Aatu Kemppainen 77'; Eetu Kemppainen 90+1' | Report | | Stadium: Pallohalli; Attendance: 50; Referee: Sakke Lyyra |

| 27 March 2022 | AC BARCA (4) | 0-4 | Kuopion Elo (4) | Kuopio |
| 19:15 | | Report | Niki Berg 26'; Taneli Heiskanen 33', 87'; Jesse Haaranen 39' | Stadium: Väre Areena; Referee: Sakke Lyyra |

| 26 March 2022 | Puijon Pallo M35 (+35) | 0-19 | Pallo-Kerho 37 (4) | Kuopio |
| 18:30 | | Report | Tomi Niskanen 7'; Miika Riihola 10', 25', 48', 67', 78'; Samuli Lyyra 20'; Joni Norring 32', 41', 53', 62'; Eetu Tenhunen 37', 75', 88'; Konsta Kääriäinen 43'; Rikhard Lappalainen 55', 77'; Timi Pääkkönen 59'; Veikka Kumpulainen 73' | Stadium: Lippumäen ylipainehalli Attendance: 41; Referee: Akseli Ropponen |

=== Group 8 ===
| 26 March 2022 | Black Eagles (6) | 2-4 | Tervarit-j (4) | Jakobstad |
| 16:30 | Sead Haxhija 32'; Behrami Egzon 76' | Report | Vertti Korkala 28', 37', 57'; Kasperi Matinlauri 47' | Stadium: Tellushallen; Referee: Raimo Takala |

| 27 March 2022 | Oulun Jalkapalloklubi (6) | 0-5 | Rovaniemi United (4) | Oulu |
| 13:00 | | Report | Valtteri Ronkainen 15', 28'; Allan Brazil De Souza e Silva 39'; Aapo Pähti 45'; Janne Ojaniemi 74' | Stadium: Heinäpään palloiluhalli Attendance: 25; Referee: Pietu Niinimäki |

| 27 March 2022 | Puleward City (5) | 0-4 | Tornion Pallo-47 (4) | Oulu |
| 15:30 | | Report | Jani Alaperä 45+8'; Ville Moilanen 45+8', 63'; Miika Eskelinen 80' | Stadium: Heinäpään palloiluhalli Attendance: 105; Referee: Elias Lindroos |

== Third round ==
58 winners from second round participate in this round along with the 50 national level clubs from top three tiers that enter the competition at this round. Teams are divided into 4 regional groups and lower-level clubs have home advantage. Winners advance to fourth round.

Number of teams per tier still in competition
| Veikkausliiga (1) | Ykkönen (2) | Kakkonen (3) | Kolmonen (4) | Nelonen (5) | Vitonen (6) | Kutonen (7) | Seiska (8) | M35 (+35) | Total |
|---|---|---|---|---|---|---|---|---|---|
| 12 / 12 | 12 / 12 | 32 / 32 | 37 / 67 | 11 / 58 | 4 / 69 | 1 / 47 | 1 / 9 | 4 / 8 | 114 / 314 |

=== Group 1 ===
| 9 April 2022 | Toejoen Veikot (4) | 0-4 | FC Åland (4) | Rauma |
| 16:00 | | Report | Samuel Nordberg 14'; Daniel Boman 60', 64', 84' | Stadium: Äijänsuon Stadion; Attendance: 1 Referee: Marko Nieminen |

| 14 April 2022 | FC Haka juniorit (4) | 0-4 | Turun Palloseura (2) | Valkeakoski |
| 19:00 | | Report | Albijon Muzaci 21'; Simo Roiha 79', 84'; Rasmus Holma 90+1' | Stadium: Tehtaan kenttä Attendance: 95; Referee: Jari Järvinen |

| 13 April 2022 | Turun Palloseura/M35 (+35) | 0-6 | Tampereen Ilves (1) | Turku |
| 19:00 | | Report | Jorn Vancamp 12'; Momodou Sarr 47'; Tabi Manga 69'; Eric Oteng 77'; Ariel Ngueukam 84'; Mikael Almén 89' | Stadium: Kupittaan liikuntakeskus 5 Attendance: 100; Referee: Samuli Stenman |

| 18 April 2022 | Tampereen Ilves/3 (8) | 1-11 | FC Inter 2 (4) | Tampere |
| 16:00 | Ersin Demir 31' | Report | Jarkko Kokkala 11', 15', 48', 76'; Aleksi Tuominen 35', 62'; Mohammed Bakkar 45+1', 68'; Elmeri Oksanen 55'; Kristian Palanen 57'; Own goal 85' | Stadium: Kaupin urheilupuisto 3 Attendance: 40; Referee: Aleksi Keronen |

| 11 April 2022 | Jyrkkälän Tykit (5) | 0-3 | Turun Pallokerho (4) | Pansio, Turku |
| 18:00 | | Report | Roope Virtanen 48'; Jyri Sundin 86'; Aleksi Jokela 89' | Stadium: Pansion kisapuisto Attendance: 30; Referee: Samuli Stenman |

| 7 April 2022 | FC Eurajoki (5) | 1-7 | Pallo-Iirot (4) | Eurajoki |
| 18:30 | Juuso Hurunen 41' | Report | Elias Ahde 6', 30', 72'; Jami Halminen 19', 34'; Sulo Ketola 66'; Markus Babb 87' | Stadium: Eurajoen tekonurmi Attendance: 120; Referee: Henrik Grönblom |

| 7 April 2022 | Åbo IFK (4) | 1-2 | Salon Palloilijat (3) | Turku |
| 20:15 | Arttu Mäki-Arvela 78' | Report | Elmo Heinonen 58'; Joonas Meura 66' | Stadium: Kupittaan liikuntakeskus 2 Attendance: 30; Referee: Einari Sario |

| 16 April 2022 | Sundom Idrottsförening (4) | 0-2 | Kaarinan Pojat (3) | Vaasa |
| 17:00 | | Report | Niklas Kuusio 16'; Kasper Kylen 90+4' | Stadium: Fennia arena Referee: Robin Kuloaro |

| 14 April 2022 | Nokian Palloseura (4) | 1-4 | Tampereen Ilves/2 (3) | Nokia |
| 20:00 | Max Siljander 13' | Report | Oiva Jukkola 73', 82'; Lauri Rasinen 78'; Miska Peltola 90' | Stadium: Menkala; Attendance: 50; Referee: Aleksi Keronen |

| 6 April 2022 | Tampereen Pallo-Veikot (4) | 0-6 | Ekenäs IF (2) | Tampere |
| 19:00 | | Report | Karl Madianga 31'; Simon Lindholm 41'; Valdrin Rashica 70', 82'; Bruno Miguel 72'; Jakob Gottberg 80' | Stadium: Kaupin urheilupuisto 3 Attendance: 71; Referee: Kalle Mäkinen |

| 9 April 2022 | Tampere United/2 (4) | 2-3 | Tampereen-Viipurin Ilves-Kissat (3) | Tampere |
| 17:00 | Ville Vähänen 21'; Simo Mäensivu 71' | Report | Toni Paukkeri 9', 61'; Antti Kujala 26' | Stadium: Kaupin urheilupuisto 3 Attendance: 103; Referee: Kalle Nummela |

| 12 April 2022 | FC Inter M35 (+35) | 0-5 | Piikkiön Palloseura (6) | Turku |
| 20:15 | | Report | Sasu Rastas 19'; Juuso Elmeranta 53', 76'; Nopanon Kingkaew 86'; Sami Villanen 90+1' | Stadium: Turku Energia Areena; Attendance: 50; Referee: Tomi Heikkilä |

| 9 April 2022 | FC Jazz (3) | 2-2 (3-4 p) | Musan Salama (3) | Pori |
| 14:00 | Rasmus Laaksonen 25'; Layon 43' | Report | Egzon Avdi 10', 27' | Stadium: Porin Urheilukeskuksen tekonurmi Attendance: 268; Referee: Jesse Salo |

| 13 April 2022 | Pargas Idrottsförening (2) | 0-3 | IFK Mariehamn (1) | Pargas |
| 17:15 | | Report | Dé 30', 57'; Felipe 82' | Stadium: Aktia LKV Arena; Attendance: 255; Referee: Joni Hyytiä |

| 14 April 2022 | Tampere United (3) | 1-3 | Hämeenlinnan Jalkapalloseura (3) | Tampere |
| 18:00 | Toni Toijala 36' | Report | Miika Paussu 40'; Eemeli Raittinen 41'; Toivo-Elmeri Supperi 56' | Stadium: Kaupin urheilukeskus 3 Attendance: 148; Referee: Juho Nieminen |

=== Group 2 ===
| 10 April 2022 | Grankulla IFK (3) | 0-1 | IF Gnistan (2) | Kauniainen |
| 18:00 | | Report | Maximo Tolonen 13' | Stadium: FA Solutions Arena; Attendance: 103; Referee: Mikko Leino |

| 13 April 2022 | Käpylän Pallo (3) | 1-1 (2-4 p) | FC Kiffen (3) | Vallila, Helsinki |
| 19:00 | Iiro Kärsämä 49' | Report | Daniel Åkerlund 8' | Stadium: Vallilanlaaksonkenttä; Attendance: 60; Referee: Antti Kolehmainen |

| 18 April 2022 | Gnistan/M35 (+35) | 0-2 | FC Espoo (4) | Oulunkylä, Helsinki |
| 19:00 | | Report | Samir Shkreli 26'; Bright Asante 49' | Stadium: Oulunkylän liikuntapuisto 1 Attendance: 98; Referee: Oskari Tuomi |

| 12 April 2022 | Laaksolahden Jalkapalloseura (5) | 0-3 | EPS/Reservi (4) | Tapiola, Espoo |
| 19:05 | | Report | Aarne Leisma 15'; Kalle Koskela 31'; Aleksi Wahlman 72' | Stadium: Esport Arena; Referee: Sami Katko |

| 8 April 2022 | Koivukylän Palloseura (4) | 2-4 | Espoon Palloseura (3) | Havukoski, Vantaa |
| 19:30 | | Report | | Stadium: Havukosken urheilupuisto |

| 11 April 2022 | PK-35/2 (5) | 1-3 | SexyPöxyt (4) | Vuosaari, Helsinki |
| 19:00 | Jami-Petteri Inkinen 76' | Report | Veeti Virta 29'; Casper Sundell 56'; Sebastian Nuorala 73' | Stadium: Kartanon tekonurmi 2 Referee: Janne Haikari |

| 12 April 2022 | HIFK/2 (4) | 0-2 | Malmin Ponnistajat (4) | Helsinki |
| 20:00 | | Report | Rob Thijssen 11'; Leevi Lehkosuo 53' | Stadium: Töölön Pallokenttä; Attendance: 50; Referee: Kim Junna |

| 12 April 2022 | Pallo-Pojat (3) | 0-0 (2-4 p) | Vantaan Jalkapalloseura (3) | Jätkäsaari, Helsinki |
| 20:15 | | Report | | Stadium: PPJ-halli; Attendance: 60; Referee: Peiman Simani |

| 13 April 2022 | Etelä-Espoon Pallo (4) | 0-4 | Pallokerho-35 (2) | Matinkylä, Espoo |
| 19:00 | | Report | Willem Haapiainen 41'; Arttu Auranen 45'; Niko Salminen 53'; Mustafa Beyai 79' | Stadium: Matinkylän Urheilupuisto 1 Attendance: 163; Referee: Mikko Leino |

| 12 April 2022 | Helsingin Palloseura (4) | 2-2 (3-5 p) | Atlantis FC (3) | Paloheinä, Helsinki |
| 20:00 | Elmer Laaksonen 12'; Eetu Ignatius 23' | Report | Mauro Severino 9'; Sergio 73' | Stadium: HofS Areena; Attendance: 127; Referee: Oskari Hämäläinen |

| 12 April 2022 | Toukolan Teräs (4) | 5-4 | Tikkurilan Palloseura (4) | Helsinki |
| 18:00 | Ilmari Olin 9'; Joona Rämö 45'; Arttu Rantala 65'; Antti Hyttinen 79'; Oskari Kokkila 84' | Report | Mohammed Mubarik 4'; Iidle Elmi 29', 74'; Arsen Ceni 81' | Stadium: Töölön Pallokenttä; Referee: Henrik Seikku |

| 12 April 2022 | EPS/I (5) | 1-8 | Klubi 04 (3) | Espoonlahti, Espoo |
| 20:15 | Jani Mahanen 45+1' | Report | Kaius Hardén 12', 34'; Luigi Moraes 36', 65'; Erikson Carlos 38'; Anton Aaltonen 49', 82'; Dylan Hayes 86' | Stadium: Espoonlahden urheilupuisto 2 Referee: Oliver Reitala |

| 13 April 2022 | SUMU/sob (5) | 0-10 | IFK Helsingfors (1) | Helsinki |
| 20:00 | | Report | Jukka Halme 28'; Keaton Isaksson 34', 44'; Eero Markkanen 51', 57', 85'; Maximus Tainio 61'; Didis Lutumba-Pitah 63'; Aatu Kujanpää 70', 73' | Stadium: Töölön Pallokenttä; Attendance: 200; Referee: Jonathan Mainz |

| 13 April 2022 | Puotinkylän Valtti (4) | 0-3 | Atlantis FC/Akatemia (4) | Puotila, Helsinki |
| 20:15 | | Report | Atte Karppinen 71'; Obi Metzger 87'; Costa Do Espirito Santo 90+1' | Stadium: Puotinlan tekonurmi Attendance: 200; Referee: Valentin Smirnov |

| 14 April 2022 | Vantaan Jalkapalloseura/2 (5) | 0-2 | MPS/Atletico Malmi (4) | Myyrmäki, Vantaa |
| 20:30 | | Report | Alexander Lindström 25'; Roni Peiponen 90' | Stadium: Myyrmäen jalkapallostadion Referee: Mikko Mörö |

=== Group 3 ===
| 9 April 2022 | SJK-j Apollo (7) | 2-10 | Kokkolan Palloveikot (2) | Seinäjoki |
| 19:00 | Mika Ojala 45+1'; Tommi Haanpää 60' | Report | Shun Maeta 12', 22', 49'; Roni Pietsalo 30', 53'; Miika Kauppila 35', 43'; Joonas Paananen 80', 90'; Wegye Wegye 85' | Stadium: Wallsport-Areena; Attendance: 75; Referee: Toni Pohjoismäki |

| 10 April 2022 | Oulun Luistinseura (3) | 1-2 | SJK Akatemia (2) | Oulu |
| 14:00 | Kuutti Matila 61' | Report | Oskar Pihlaja 66'; Borry Sabally 89' | Stadium: Heinäpään palloilihalli Attendance: 156; Referee: Tatu Korkalainen |

| 13 April 2022 | Gamlakarleby Bollklubb (3) | 0-5 | AC Oulu (1) | Kokkola |
| 17:30 | | Report | Otso Liimatta 9'; Marius Könkkölä 32', 90+1'; Onni Suutari 48'; Michael López 72' | Stadium: Kokkolan Keskuskenttä; Attendance: 201; Referee: Toni Pohjoismäki |

| 22 April 2022 | Kokkolan Palloseura (6) | 1-15 | Tornion Pallo-47 (4) | Kokkola |
| 19:30 | Joni Sorvoja 8' | Report | Ville Moilanen 2', 43', 72', 88'; Miika Eskelinen 15'; Eemil Saloniemi 37'; Joona Konttajärvi 45'; Aleksi Isomäki 51'; Henri Korkeamäki 56'; Topias Wiena 65', 75'; Luka Liimatta 67', 76', 83', 87' | Stadium: Kipparihalli; Attendance: 99; Referee: Tony Mäki |

| 12 April 2022 | FC Kiisto (4) | 0-5 | FF Jaro (2) | Vaasa |
| 19:00 | | Report | Guillermo Sotelo 48'; Markus Kronholm 63'; Severi Kähkönen 77', 78', 80' | Stadium: Elisa stadion Referee: Mikko Juusola |

| 13 April 2022 | Tervarit-j (6) | 0-8 | Vaasan Palloseura (1) | Oulu |
| 18:00 | | Report | Kalle Multanen 9'; Own goal 13'; Juhani Pikkarainen 16'; Josep Nuorela 25'; Kareem Moses 43'; Aleksi Pahkasalo 65', 70', 74' | Stadium: Heinäpään palloiluhalli Attendance: 214; Referee: Pietu Niinimäki |

| 9 April 2022 | Rovaniemi United (4) | 1-3 | Rovaniemen Palloseura (3) | Rovaniemi |
| 18:30 | Antti Keränen 45+1' | Report | Eelis Taskila 31'; Oumar Balde 34'; Tatu Lakela 87' | Stadium: Ounashalli; Attendance: 136; Referee: John Wikman |

| 10 April 2022 | Vasa IFK (3) | 2-0 | JS Hercules (3) | Vaasa |
| 17:30 | Giuseppe Lo Giudice 5'; Kasperi Polvilampi 26' | Report | | Stadium: Elisa stadion Attendance: 87; Referee: Antti Palomäki |

=== Group 4 ===
| 9 April 2022 | FC Futura (3) | 0-6 | Kotkan Työväen Palloilijat (2) | Porvoo |
| 16:00 | | Report | Joni Mäkelä 4'; Lassi Nurmos 32', 50'; Mika 44', 48'; Santeri Stenius 82' | Stadium: Porvoon Pallokenttä; Attendance: 291; Referee: Juuso Vuorinen |

| 9 April 2022 | Nurmijärven Jalkapalloseura (3) | 1-4 | Järvenpään Palloseura (2) | Klaukkala, Nurmijärvi |
| 16:30 | Mohamed Lassoued 49' | Report | Aleksi Ristola 14', 36', 52'; Reza Heidari 44' | Stadium: Klaukkalan urheilualue TN; Attendance: 145; Referee: Joona Manninen |

| 9 April 2022 | FC Vaajakoski (3) | 0-3 | Lahden Reipas (3) | Jyväskylä |
| 18:00 | | Report | Gullit Zolameso 33'; Tim Martinen 43', 63' | Stadium: Vehkahalli; Referee: Ayhan Dag |

| 9 April 2022 | LAUTP (6) | 1-3 | SC Riverball (4) | Lappeenranta |
| 18:30 | Miro Ruokoniemi 81' | Report | Vladislav Dirgin 45+1'; Eero Naakka 64'; Ville Kuusela 67' | Stadium: Amis; Attendance: 115; Referee: Tommi Rautiainen |

| 10 April 2022 | Haminan Pallo-Kissat (4) | 3-1 | FC LaPa (3) | Kotka |
| 12:15 | Lennart Voikar 15'; Nico Pietiläinen 30'; Joona Pasi 40' | Report | Erkka Partanen 90+2' | Stadium: Arto Tolsa Areena; Attendance: 131; Referee: Turo Veini |

| 15 April 2022 | Imatran Palloseura (4) | 0-6 | Komeetat (3) | Imatra |
| 12:15 | | Report | Own goal 6'; Sampo Mehto 55'; Morad Chadid 75', 87'; Miikka Muurikainen 90+2'; Matias Niemelä 90+3' | Stadium: Ukonniemi Areena; Attendance: 109; Referee: Remi Rantakaulio |

| 10 April 2022 | Kajaanin Palloilijat (6) | 0-1 | Kouvolan Jalkapallo (4) | Kajaani |
| 19:30 | | Report | Niko Nakari 34' | Stadium: Pallohalli; Attendance: 50; Referee: Heikki Ikonen |

| 9 April 2022 | Nouseva Laaka (4) | 2-1 | Tuusulan Palloseura (4) | Jokela, Tuusula |
| 18:00 | Jere Korpela 4'; Jani Kaunisto 78' | Report | Youssef Zaher 90+1' | Stadium: Jokelan tekonurmi Referee: Jesse Aalto |

| 13 April 2022 | Kuopion Elo (4) | 0-6 | FC Lahti (1) | Kuopio |
| 19:00 | | Report | Geoffrey Chinedu 22'; Macoumba Kandji 44', 50'; Arlind Sejdiu 60'; Pyry Lampinen 67'; Matti Klinga 73' | Stadium: Väre Areena; Attendance: 392; Referee: Ayhan Dag |

| 13 April 2022 | Blue Eyes Team (5) | 1-15 | PEPO Lappeenranta (2) | Jyväskylä |
| 19:30 | Simo Korpela 43' | Report | Miro Marin 8'; Nikke Veikkanen 12', 41', 53', 72'; Irfan Sadik 19', 20'; Jeannot Esua 24'; Joel Laitinen 50'; Joonatan Sinkkonen 52'; Jami Visto 57'; Tommi Roponen 58'; Juho Heikkinen 59'; Zachary Sukunda 70', 76' | Stadium: Vehkahalli; Attendance: 40; Referee: Miikka Haapakoski |

| 17 April 2022 | Jyväskylän Seudun Palloseura (4) | 0-4 | Pallokerho Keski-Uusimaa (3) | Jyväskylä |
| 15:00 | | Report | Roni Mäkilä 4'; Oscar Dahlfors 46', 55'; Hugo Toivonen 50' | Stadium: Viitaniemi; Referee: Kalle Nummela |

| 9 April 2022 | Hyvinkään Palloseura (5) | 2-0 | Pallo-Kerho 37 (4) | Hyvinkää |
| 17:30 | Arttu Huovila 30'; Konsta Laakoli 77' | Report | | Stadium: Kankurin tekonurmi Attendance: 102; Referee: Oskari Tuomi |

| 9 April 2022 | Kotkan Jäntevä (5) | 0-9 | Mikkelin Palloilijat (2) | Kotka |
| 17:00 | | Report | Joona Hiltunen 2', 35', 56'; Juuso Tarvainen 34'; Topi Keskinen 42', 43'; Kevin Beugré 76'; Eero Ylönen 89', 90+1' | Stadium: Arto Tolsa Areena; Attendance: 151; Referee: Lassi Matilainen |

| 8 April 2022 | Jalkarannan Palloseura M/35 (+35) | 1-6 | Jyväskylän Jalkapalloklubi (3) | Lahti |
| 18:30 | Drilon Shala 52' | Report | Aleksis Lehtonen 10'; Lauri Paananen 41'; Ville Kirvesoja 55'; Robin Saastamoinen 78'; Maxime Nzeza 87', 90+2' | Stadium: Mukkulan Halli; Attendance: 238; Referee: Abdirahman Sugulle |

| 19 April 2022 | Niemisen Urheilijat (5) | 0-4 | JIPPO (3) | Ylämylly, Liperi |
| 19:30 | | Report | Santeri Saarenkunnas 38'; Niko Niemeläinen 50'; Niklas Sottinen 62'; Toni Tahvanainen 71' | Stadium: Paloaukean kenttä Attendance: 178; Referee: Miika Pesonen |

| 10 April 2022 | Peli-Karhut (3) | 4-3 | Kajaanin Haka (3) | Kotka |
| 15:00 | Aapo Hyppönen 4'; Jani Lauretsalo 36'; Joakim Joutjärvi 54', 71' | Report | Own goal 63'; Kenedy Santos 82', 86' | Stadium: Arto Tolsa Areena; Attendance: 100; Referee: Remi Rantakaulio |

== Fourth round ==
54 winners from third round participate in this round along with the 2 Veikkausliiga clubs with best performance in league cup. Teams from same club still in competition or clubs with reserve partnership are set against each other from this round onward. Teams are divided into 4 regional groups and lower-level clubs have home advantage. Winners advance to fifth round.

Number of teams per tier still in competition
| Veikkausliiga (1) | Ykkönen (2) | Kakkonen (3) | Kolmonen (4) | Nelonen (5) | Vitonen (6) | Kutonen (7) | Seiska (8) | M35 (+35) | Total |
|---|---|---|---|---|---|---|---|---|---|
| 12 / 12 | 11 / 12 | 19 / 32 | 16 / 67 | 1 / 58 | 1 / 69 | 0 / 47 | 0 / 9 | 0 / 8 | 60 / 314 |

=== Group 1 ===
| 3 May 2022 | FC Åland (4) | 0–6 | IFK Mariehamn (1) | Mariehamn |
| 18:30 | Eriksson (yellow card) 27'; Nordenholm (yellow card) 44'; Göstas (yellow card) 45+2' | Report | Owoeri 12'; Raitanen (yellow card) 27'; Felipe 41', 57'; Hambo 83'; Dé 88' (90+2) | Stadium: Wiklöf Holding Arena; Attendance: 200; Referee: Hajizadeh Amir |

| 11 May 2022 | Ilves/2 (3) | 2-1 | Ilves (1) | Tampere |
| 18:00 | Minkkinen 35'; Own goal 90+5' | Report | Ngueukam 59' | Stadium: Ratinan Stadion; Attendance: 215; Referee: Lassi Siukkola |

| 2 May 2022 | FC Inter 2 (4) | 3–2 | Pallo-Iirot (4) | Turku |
| 19:45 | Kokkala 23' (pen); Own goal 44'; Inkeroinen (yellow card) 62'; Bajrami 69'; Oksanen (yellow card) 71'; Heinonen (yellow card) 85' | Report | Lainio (yellow card) 22'; Whiting 59'; Pertola (yellow card) 65'; Babb (yellow card) 80'; Ahde 89' | Stadium: Turku Energia Areena; Referee: Makkonen Aleksi |

| 3 May 2022 | Turun Pallokerho (4) | 0–4 | Tampereen-Viipurin Ilves-Kissat (3) | Turku |
| 19:00 | Zaya (yellow card) 30'; Lehtonen (yellow card) 67'; Wikstedt (yellow card) 75'; Teräsranta (yellow card) 76' | Report | Own goal 15'; Nikkilä (yellow card) 39'; Chidi 51'; Paukkeri (yellow card) 62'; Al-Fatli (yellow card) 71' (goal) 77' (pen); Lindholm (yellow card) 90+1' | Stadium: Kupittaan liikuntakeskus 5 Attendance: 30; Referee: Stenman Samuli |

| 4 May 2022 | Turun Palloseura (2) | 1-1 (2-3 p) | FC Haka (1) | Turku |
| 18:30 | Hämäläinen 60' | Report | Rogerson 47' | Stadium: Kupittaan liikuntakeskus 2 Attendance: 313; Referee: Peiman Simani |

| 4 May 2022 | Musan Salama (3) | 0-0 (4-5 p) | Salon Palloilijat (3) | Pori |
| 18:30 | | Report | | Stadium: Urheilukeskuksen tekonurmi Attendance: 247; Referee: Lina Lehtovaara |

| 3 May 2022 | Piikkiön Palloseura (6) | 1-1 (3-5 p) | Hämeenlinnan Jalkapalloseura (3) | Piikkiö, Kaarina |
| 18:30 | Elmeranta 63' | Report | Kolsi 47' | Stadium: POP-Areena; Referee: Einari Sario |

| 3 May 2022 | Kaarinan Pojat (3) | 2-2 (2-4 p) | Ekenäs IF (2) | Kaarina |
| 19:00 | Salminen 24', 69' | Report | Larsson 20'; Madianga 86' | Stadium: Puuha-Areena; Attendance: 104; Referee: Jesse Salo |

=== Group 2 ===
| 3 May 2022 | FC Honka (1) | 1-1 (3-4 p) | Helsingfors IFK (1) | Myyrmäki, Vantaa |
| 18:00 | Heiskanen 30' | Report | Lutumba-Pitah 12' | Stadium: Myyrmäen jalkapallostadion Attendance: 368; Referee: Oliver Reitala |

| 10 May 2022 | Malmin Ponnistajat (4) | 1-1 (3-4 p) | SexyPöxyt (4) | Tapulikaupunki, Helsinki |
| 20:00 | Koskinen 90' | Report | Koski 59' | Stadium: Tapulin tekonurmi Attendance: 71; Referee: Oskari Tuomi |

| 4 May 2022 | HJK Klubi 04 (3) | 3-1 | IF Gnistan (2) | Helsinki |
| 18:30 | Toivonen 9'; Aaltonen 21'; Rökman 52' | Report | Tolonen 12' | Stadium: Bolt Arena; Attendance: 97; Referee: Joona Manninen |

| 3 May 2022 | Toukolan Teräs (4) | 0-4 | Pallokerho-35 (2) | Pihlajamäki, Helsinki |
| 18:00 | | Report | Markhiyev 3', 30'; Kaijasilta 17'; Haapiainen 90+2 52' | Stadium: MagneCit Areena; Referee: Juuso Vuorinen |

| 7 May 2022 | FC Espoo (4) | 0-4 | FC Kiffen (3) | Leppävaara, Espoo |
| 15:00 | | Report | Hopsu 19', 63'; Korhonen 31'; Savolainen 82' | Stadium: Säterinniityn liikuntapuisto Attendance: 50; Referee: Henrik Seikku |

| 13 May 2022 | MPS/Atletico Malmi (4) | 1-7 | Vantaan Jalkapalloseura (3) | Tapanila, Helsinki |
| 20:15 | Ollila 31' | Report | Alaeddine 11'; Lankinen 14'; Zaknoun 49', 68'; Jmaali 52'; Burton 53'; Nyholm 88' | Stadium: Mosan Wembley; Attendance: 70; Referee: Osman Mohammadi |

| 12 May 2022 | Atlantis FC/Akatemia (4) | 0-6 | Atlantis FC (3) | Tali, Helsinki |
| 18:00 | | Report | Rudenko 16'; Katashira 21', 67'; Costa De Lima 48'; Lehtonen 79', 86' | Stadium: Talin Halli; Attendance: 103; Referee: Abdirahman Sugulle |

| 8 May 2022 | EPS/Reservi (4) | 0-3 | Espoon Palloseura (3) | Espoonlahti, Espoo |
| 17:00 | | Report | Nakada 18', 54'; Massinen 77' | Stadium: Espoonlahden urheilupuisto 2 Attendance: 130; Referee: Osman Mohammadi |

=== Group 3 ===
| 27 April 2022 | Vasa IFK (3) | 1–4 | SJK Akatemia (2) | Vaasa |
| 19:30 | Silvennoinen 43' | Report | Pihlaja 6'; Ebuka 35' (pen) 55'; Valentin Gasc 38' | Stadium: Fennia Arena; Attendance: 76; Referee: Toni Pohjoismäki |

| 3 May 2022 | Rovaniemen Palloseura (3) | 0–4 | FF Jaro (2) | Rovaniemi |
| 18:30 | | Report | Myrevik 37'; Björkskog 59'; Ramsay 60'; Bjonbäck 84' | Stadium: Rovaniemen keskuskenttä Attendance: 275; Referee: Niinimäki Pietu |

| 3 May 2022 | Tornion Pallo-47 (4) | 1–4 | AC Oulu (1) | Tornio |
| 18:30 | Iso-Koivisto (yellow card) 19' | Report | Nogha (yellow card) 21' (goal) 45+4'; Breitenmoser (yellow card) 36'; Suutari 74', 82'; Floro 90+3' (pen) | Stadium: Puuluodon urheilukeskus Attendance: 304; Referee: Korkalainen Tatu |

| 3 May 2022 | Kokkolan Palloveikot (2) | 1–5 | Vaasan Palloseura (1) | Kokkola |
| 18:00 | Curinga (yellow card) 5'; Wegye 70' | Report | Morrissey 2'; Strandvall 8' (pen); Moses (yellow card) 45'; Engström (yellow card) 58'; Yengi 82'; Sillah 90+3', 90+5' | Stadium: Kokkolan Keskuskenttä; Attendance: 427; Referee: Nieminen Juho |

=== Group 4 ===
| 3 May 2022 | Lahden Reipas (3) | 0-5 | FC Lahti (1) | Lahti |
| 19:00 | | Report | Kandji 53'; Sejdiu 68'; Geoffrey 71', 90'; Penninkangas 90+1' | Stadium: Lahden kisapuisto Attendance: 2101; Referee: Matti Roth |

| 3 May 2022 | Peli-Karhut (3) | 1-3 | Kotkan Työväen Palloilijat (2) | Karhula, Kotka |
| 18:30 | Hyppönen 41' | Report | Own goal 45+2'; Stenius 48'; MIKA 90+1' | Stadium: Karhulan keskuskenttä Attendance: 250; Referee: Ayhan Dag |

| 3 May 2022 | Hyvinkään Palloseura (5) | 1-2 | Järvenpään Palloseura (2) | Hyvinkää |
| 18:30 | Huovila 72' | Report | Khayat 2'; Palmasto 37' | Stadium: Kankurin liikuntapuisto Attendance: 300; Referee: Jonathan Mainz |

| 3 May 2022 | Komeetat (3) | 1-0 | PEPO (2) | Keltinmäki, Jyväskylä |
| 18:00 | Nousiainen 56' | Report | | Stadium: Comets Park; Attendance: 141; Referee: Jani Laaksonen |

| 4 May 2022 | SC Riverball (4) | 0-8 | Mikkelin Palloilijat (2) | Ylämylly, Liperi |
| 17:15 | | Report | Beugré 10', 51', 53'; Nihorimbere 32'; Goljahanpoor 71'; Ylönen 83'; Kilpeläinen 85'; Leinonen 90+1' | Stadium: Paloaukean tekonurmi Attendance: 47; Referee: Miikka Haapakoski |

| 3 May 2022 | JIPPO (3) | 1-1 (3-2 p) | Jyväskylän Jalkapalloklubi (3) | Rantakylä, Joensuu |
| 18:30 | Turunen 55' | Report | Salo 38' | Stadium: Rantakylän Liikuntahalli; Attendance: 248; Referee: Jooa Itämäki |

| 8 May 2022 | Haminan Pallo-Kissat (4) | 1-1 (4-3 p) | Pallokerho Keski-Uusimaa (3) | Karhula, Kotka |
| 13:30 | Pasi 3' | Report | Kamara 84' | Stadium: Karhulan keskuskenttä Attendance: 88; Referee: Remi Rantakaulio |

| 15 May 2022 | Nouseva Laaka (4) | 0-2 | Kouvolan Jalkapallo (4) | Järvenpää |
| 16:00 | | Report | Venäläinen 70'; Nurminen 84' | Stadium: Koivusaari; Attendance: 52; Referee: Antti Malaska |

== Fifth round ==
4 remaining Veikkausliiga clubs who participate to European competitions in 2022–23 season, enter this round with 28 winners from fourth round. From this round on draw is nationwide without regional baskets or home advantage for teams in lower divisions. Teams from same club and teams with reserve agreements are placed against each other. Winners advance to round of 16.

Number of teams per tier still in competition
| Veikkausliiga (1) | Ykkönen (2) | Kakkonen (3) | Kolmonen (4) | Nelonen (5) | Vitonen (6) | Kutonen (7) | Seiska (8) | M35 (+35) | Total |
|---|---|---|---|---|---|---|---|---|---|
| 10 / 12 | 7 / 12 | 11 / 32 | 4 / 67 | 0 / 58 | 0 / 69 | 0 / 47 | 0 / 9 | 0 / 8 | 32 / 314 |

| 24 May 2022 | FC Inter (1) | 10–0 | FC Inter/2 (4) | Turku |
| 18:30 | Arsalo 20', 49', 55'; Lepistö 25', 68'; Lehtisalo 30', 33', 43'; Tamminen 47'; Källman 90+3' | Report | | Stadium: Turku Energia Areena; Attendance: 211; Referee: Pouria Notash |

| 25 May 2022 | Espoon Palloseura (3) | 0–3 | IFK Mariehamn (1) | Espoonlahti, Espoo |
| 18:30 | | Report | Felipe 45+1', 50'; Tamminen 78' | Stadium: Espoonlahden urheilupuisto 2 Attendance: 951; Referee: Mikko Leino |

| 25 May 2022 | AC Oulu (1) | 4–0 | Ilves/2 (3) | Oulu |
| 18:00 | Nogha 20'; Suutari 33'; Anini Junior. 56', 58' | Report | | Stadium: Raatti Stadium; Attendance: 552; Referee: Pietu Niinimäki |

| 26 May 2022 | SexyPöxyt (4) | 0–7 | Helsingfors IFK (1) | Helsinki |
| 13:00 | | Report | Ali 3', 62'; Lutumba-Pitah 20', 40'; Isaksson 54'; Pipe Sáez 65'; Eremenko 89' | Stadium: Bolt Arena; Attendance: 607; Referee: Joona Manninen |

| 26 May 2022 | Kuopion Palloseura (1) | 5–1 | Ekenäs IF (2) | Kuopio |
| 15:00 | Bispo 36'; Popovitch 62'; Järvinen 76'; Savolainen 80'; Väyrynen 85' | Report | Efimov 66' | Stadium: Väre Areena; Attendance: 471; Referee: Ville Nevalainen |

| 26 May 2022 | Kouvolan Jalkapallo (4) | 3–6 | Salon Palloilijat (3) | Kouvola |
| 16:00 | Nakari 8', 12'; Nurminen 26' | Report | Siirtola 45+1', 69'; Rautiainen 64', 66'; Ahmadi 68', 90+4' | Stadium: Sarkolan urheilupuisto Attendance: 150; Referee: Antti Kolehmainen |

| 25 May 2022 | Haminan Pallo-Kissat (4) | 2–6 | FC Lahti (1) | Hamina |
| 17:30 | Pasi 43', 67' | Report | Kandji 19', 40'; Köse 35'; Alan Henrique 44'; Geoffrey 49'; Memolla 87' | Stadium: Urheilukenttä; Attendance: 0 Referee: Juuso Vuorinen |

| 25 May 2022 | Ilves-Kissat (3) | 2–7 | Pallokerho-35 (2) | Tampere |
| 19:00 | Ben 44'; Ibisevic 80' | Report | Beyai 7', 27', 39'; Isotalo 18'; Haapiainen 23', 70'; Kaijasilta 37' | Stadium: Kaupin Urheilupuisto 3 Attendance: 100; Referee: Ayhan Dag |

| 25 May 2022 | Järvenpään Palloseura (2) | 3–1 | Komeetat (3) | Järvenpää |
| 19:00 | Palmasto 18'; Ulmanen 50'; Kuosa 55' | Report | Kovaqi 35' | Stadium: Järvenpään keskusurheilukenttä Attendance: 192; Referee: Matti Roth |

| 25 May 2022 | JIPPO (3) | 1–3 | Atlantis FC (3) | Joensuu |
| 18:30 | Turunen 88' | Report | Coker 45+1', 72', 73' | Stadium: Joensuun Keskuskenttä; Attendance: 311; Referee: Miikka Haapakoski |

| 25 May 2022 | Vaasan Palloseura (1) | 2–0 | Vantaan Jalkapalloseura (3) | Vaasa |
| 18:30 | Multanen 16'; Reid 89' | Report | | Stadium: Elisa Stadion; Attendance: 304; Referee: Toni Pohjoismäki |

| 24 May 2022 | Klubi 04 (3) | 0–4 | Helsingin Jalkapalloklubi (1) | Helsinki |
| 18:00 | | Report | Yli-Kokko 28', 47'; Riski 32'; Terho 57' | Stadium: Bolt Arena; Attendance: 431; Referee: Dennis Antamo |

| 25 May 2022 | SJK Akatemia (2) | 2–3 | Seinäjoen Jalkapallokerho (1) | Seinäjoki |
| 18:00 | Muzinga 90+1'; Pahkala 90+2' | Report | Kaukua 32'; Hannola 42'; Oliinyk 85' | Stadium: OmaSP Stadion; Attendance: 564; Referee: Mikko Juusola |

| 25 May 2022 | Hämeenlinnan Jalkapalloseura (3) | 2–0 | Kiffen (3) | Hämeenlinna |
| 18:30 | Paussu 3'; Mokuma 43' | Report | | Stadium: Pullerin tekonurmi Attendance: 244; Referee: Amir Hajizadeh |

| 25 May 2022 | Kotkan Työväen Palloilijat (2) | 2–4 | FC Haka (1) | Kotka |
| 18:30 | Ramadingaye 10'; Mika 22' | Report | Donaldo Açka 40'; Zarokostas 51', 90+5'; Whyte 64' | Stadium: Arto Tolsa Areena; Attendance: 550; Referee: Oliver Reitala |

| 25 May 2022 | Mikkelin Palloilijat (2) | 0–0 (4–3 p) | FF Jaro (2) | Mikkeli |
| 19:00 | | Report | | Stadium: Mikkelin Urheilupuisto; Attendance: 395; Referee: Juho Nieminen |

== Sixth round ==
Draw for sixth round will be held on 31 May.

Number of teams per tier still in competition
| Veikkausliiga (1) | Ykkönen (2) | Kakkonen (3) | Kolmonen (4) | Nelonen (5) | Vitonen (6) | Kutonen (7) | Seiska (8) | M35 (+35) | Total |
|---|---|---|---|---|---|---|---|---|---|
| 10 / 12 | 3 / 12 | 3 / 32 | 0 / 67 | 0 / 58 | 0 / 69 | 0 / 47 | 0 / 9 | 0 / 8 | 16 / 314 |

| 13 June 2022 | SJK (1) | 1–1 (3–5 p) | FC Inter (1) | Seinäjoki |
| 18:00 | Markkula (yellow card) 15'; Tikkanen (yellow card) 56'; Oliynyk 63' | Report | Niska 53'; Nurmi (yellow card) 81' | Stadium: OmaSP Stadion; Attendance: 1,153; Referee: Dennis Antamo |
| | Penalties |
| | Jervis (penalty missed); Kaukua (penalty scored); Oliynyk (penalty scored); Laine (penalty scored) | | (penalty scored) Forsell; (penalty scored) Lepistö; (penalty scored) Ojala; (penalty scored) Haro; (penalty scored) Bonet |

| 13 June 2022 | VPS (1) | 0–0 (1–2 p) | Helsingin Jalkapalloklubi (1) | Vaasa |
| 18:00 | Pikkarainen (yellow card) 46'; Yengi (yellow card) 71' | Report | Boujellab (yellow card) 38' | Stadium: Kaarlen kenttä Attendance: 780; Referee: Petri Viljanen |
| | Penalties |
| | Morrissey (penalty missed); Pahkasalo (penalty missed); Pikkarainen (penalty missed); Lindeman (penalty scored); Yengi (penalty missed) | | (penalty scored) Radulović; (penalty missed) Toivio; (penalty missed) Hostikka; (penalty missed) Boujellab; (penalty scored) Martic |

| 13 June 2022 | MP (2) | 0–1 | KuPS (1) | Mikkeli |
| 19:00 | | Report | Popovitch (yellow card) 27'; Bispo 74' | Stadium: Mikkelin Urheilupuisto; Attendance: 1,203; Referee: Antti Munukka |

| 13 June 2022 | IFK Mariehamn (1) | 1–1 (a.e.t.) (2–4 p) | HIFK (1) | Mariehamn |
| 19:30 | Tamminen (yellow card) 47'; Owoeri 56' (yellow card) 60' | Report | Bäckman 3'; Paatelainen (yellow card) 79'; Eremenko (yellow card) 90+5' | Stadium: Wiklöf Holding Arena; Attendance: 1,315; Referee: Peiman Simani |
| | Penalties |
| | Basilo (penalty scored); Felipe (penalty missed); Sid (penalty scored); Hambo (penalty missed) | | (penalty scored) Saez; (penalty scored) Kujanpää; (penalty scored) Eremenko; (penalty scored) Tainio |

| 14 June 2022 | HJS (3) | 0–1 | FC Haka (1) | Hämeenlinna |
| 18:00 | | Report | Herbert (yellow card) 26'; Zarokostas (yellow card) 34'; Laine 86' | Stadium: Kaurialana kenttä Attendance: 1,402; Referee: Jesse Salo |

| 14 June 2022 | JäPS (2) | 2–1 | AC Oulu (1) | Järvenpää |
| 18:30 | Meriläinen (yellow card) 34'; Kassim (yellow card) 45+2'; Ärilä (yellow card) 51'; Kepot (yellow card) 76'; Sesay 82'; Own goal 87' | Report | Rafinha (yellow card) 45+2'; Banza 47'; Könkkölä (yellow card) 81' | Stadium: Järvenpään keskusurheilukenttä Attendance: 607; Referee: Oliver Reitala |

| 14 June 2022 | FC Lahti (1) | 4–2 | Atlantis FC (2) | Lahti |
| 18:30 | Chinedu 49', 83'; Kandji 60'; Ademi 66' | Report | Ibekwe 23', 58' | Stadium: Lahden Stadion; Attendance: 860; Referee: Kalle Mäkinen |

| 15 June 2022 | PK-35 (2) | 1–0 | SalPa (3) | Pihlajamäki, Helsinki |
| 19:00 | Terävä (yellow card) 44'; Beyai 57'; Raimi (yellow card) 81' | Report | Yacoob (yellow card) 43' | Stadium: MagneCit Areena; Attendance: 256; Referee: Lina Lehtovaara |

== Quarterfinals ==
Number of teams per tier still in competition
| Veikkausliiga (1) | Ykkönen (2) | Kakkonen (3) | Kolmonen (4) | Nelonen (5) | Vitonen (6) | Kutonen (7) | Seiska (8) | M35 (+35) | Total |
|---|---|---|---|---|---|---|---|---|---|
| 6 / 12 | 2 / 12 | 0 / 32 | 0 / 67 | 0 / 58 | 0 / 69 | 0 / 47 | 0 / 9 | 0 / 8 | 8 / 314 |

| 28 June 2022 | FC Lahti (1) | 2–1 | JäPS (2) | Lahti |
| 18:30 | Chinedu 13'; Reguero (red card) 27'; Ademi (yellow card) 32'; Kouassivi-Benissan (yellow card) 45+2'; Emsis (yellow card) 45+4'; Virta (yellow card) 45+5'; Kandji (yellow card) 65'; Henrique 90+1'; Memolla (yellow card) 90+4' | Report | Palmasto 30' (pen); Heidari (yellow card) 50' | Stadium: Lahden Stadion; Attendance: 1,115; Referee: Matti Roth |

| 28 June 2022 | Inter Turku (1) | 0–0 (5–4 p) | HJK (1) | Turku |
| 18:00 | Tamminen (yellow card) 44'; Ketting (yellow card) 54' | Report | Boujellab (yellow card) 30'; Murilo (yellow card) 55' | Stadium: Veritas Stadion; Attendance: 1,462; Referee: Oskari Hämäläinen |
| | Penalties |
| | Forsell (penalty scored); Källman (penalty scored); Ojala (penalty scored); Haro (penalty scored); Ruxi (penalty scored) | | (penalty scored) Browne; (penalty scored) Olusanya; (penalty scored) Soiri; (penalty scored) Hoskonen; (penalty missed) Tånnander |

| 28 June 2022 | FC Haka (1) | 2–2 (2–4 p) | KuPS (1) | Valkeakoski |
| 18:30 | Rogerson 31'; Erwin 72'; Açka (yellow card) 84' | Report | Väyrynen 13' (pen); Carrillo (yellow card) 28'; Ikaunieks (yellow card) 43'; Bispo 46'; Tomas (yellow card) 79' | Stadium: Tehtaan kenttä Attendance: 750; Referee: Petri Viljanen |
| | Penalties |
| | Erwin (penalty missed); Açka (penalty scored); Rogerson (penalty scored); Ojala (penalty missed) | | (penalty scored) Väyrynen; (penalty scored) Dahlström; (penalty scored) Popovitch; (penalty scored) Tomas |

| 28 June 2022 | PK-35 (2) | 2–2 (4–5 p) | HIFK (1) | Pihlajamäki, Helsinki |
| 19:00 | Beyai 73'; Tainio 83'; Kuusijärvi (yellow card) 90+2' | Report | Sáez 21'; Kujanpää (yellow card) 39' (goal) 43' | Stadium: MagneCit Areena; Attendance: 814; Referee: Joni Hyytiä |
| | Penalties |
| | Kuusijärvi (penalty missed); Beyai (penalty scored); Mohamed (penalty scored); Tainio (penalty scored); Terävä (penalty scored) | | (penalty scored) Sáez; (penalty scored) Markkanen; (penalty scored) Tainio; (penalty scored) Eremenko; (penalty scored) Bäckman |

== Semifinals ==
Number of teams per tier still in competition
| Veikkausliiga (1) | Ykkönen (2) | Kakkonen (3) | Kolmonen (4) | Nelonen (5) | Vitonen (6) | Kutonen (7) | Seiska (8) | M35 (+35) | Total |
|---|---|---|---|---|---|---|---|---|---|
| 4 / 12 | 0 / 12 | 0 / 32 | 0 / 67 | 0 / 58 | 0 / 69 | 0 / 47 | 0 / 9 | 0 / 8 | 4 / 314 |

| 30 August 2022 | FC Lahti (1) | 0–1 | KuPS (1) | Lahti |
| 18:30 | Memolla (yellow card) 15'; Emsis (yellow card) 45+1'; Kabashi (yellow card) 52'; Salanović (yellow card) 63' | Report | Ikaunieks 14' (yellow card) 55'; Virtanen (red card) 15' | Stadium: Lahten Stadium; Attendance: 1,105; Referee: Antti Munukka |

| 30 August 2022 | HIFK (1) | 2–3 | FC Inter Turku (1) | Helsinki |
| 18:00 | Ani 32' (yellow card) 41' (yellow-red card) 90+4'; Mattila (yellow card) 35'; Eremenko (yellow card) 63'; Sæthre (yellow card) 78'; Klinkenberg 83' | Report | Rodríguez (yellow card) 24'; Paananen 43'; Accam 58' (Forsell) 80'; Tamminen (yellow card) 90+2'; Kuittinen (yellow card) 90+3' | Stadium: Bolt Arena; Attendance: 1,897; Referee: Petri Viljanen |

== Final ==
Number of teams per tier still in competition
| Veikkausliiga (1) | Ykkönen (2) | Kakkonen (3) | Kolmonen (4) | Nelonen (5) | Vitonen (6) | Kutonen (7) | Seiska (8) | M35 (+35) | Total |
|---|---|---|---|---|---|---|---|---|---|
| 2 / 12 | 0 / 12 | 0 / 32 | 0 / 67 | 0 / 58 | 0 / 69 | 0 / 47 | 0 / 9 | 0 / 8 | 2 / 314 |

| 17 September 2022 | KuPS (1) | 1–0 | FC Inter Turku (1) | Helsinki |
| 16:00 | Oksanen (yellow card) 24'; Bispo 88' (Toivomäki) | Report | Ruxi (yellow card) 60'; Paananen (yellow card) 75'; Muñoz (yellow card) 90+4'; Viitala (yellow card) 90+5'; Nazarit (yellow card) 90+6' | Stadium: Helsinki Olympic Stadium; Attendance: 3,372; Referee: Mohammad Al-Emara |
