= Moilanen =

Moilanen is a Finnish surname. Notable people with the surname include:

- Kaapro Moilanen (1878–1957), Finnish schoolteacher, journalist and politician
- Louis Moilanen (1886–1913), Finnish-born giant
- Tepi Moilanen (born 1973), Finnish professional footballer
- Janne Moilanen (born 1978), Finnish footballer
- Ville Moilanen (born 1999), Finnish professional footballer
