= Gabriel Bispo =

Brazilian footballer (born 1997)

Personal information
- Full name: Gabriel Bispo dos Santos
- Date of birth: 5 March 1997 (age 29)
- Place of birth: Trancoso, Brazil
- Height: 1.81 m (5 ft 11 in)
- Positions: Central midfielder; forward

Youth career
- Bahia de Feira

Senior career*
Years	Team	Apps	(Gls)
2019	Bahia de Feira	11	(2)
2019	→ Vitória (loan)	8	(0)
2020–2021	Vitória	29	(1)
2020	→ Juventude (loan)	27	(0)
2022–2023	KuPS	46	(8)
2024	Paysandu	12	(0)
2024	Guarani	20	(2)
2025	Botafogo-SP	38	(1)
2026	Foshan Nanshi	12	(4)
- * Club domestic league appearances and goals as of 30 May 2026

Gabriel Bispo dos Santos (born 5 March 1997) is a Brazilian professional footballer who plays as a midfielder.

== Club career ==
On 16 November 2021, Bispo moved to Finland after signing a deal with Kuopion Palloseura (KuPS) in top-tier Veikkausliiga. While playing with KuPS under the manager Simo Valakari in 2022, he was mainly used in an attacking role or as a forward. In September 2022, in the 2022 Finnish Cup final, Bispo scored the winning goal as KuPS defeated Inter Turku 1–0, and were crowned the Finnish Cup champions.

== Career statistics ==
As of match played 30 May 2026

Appearances and goals by club, season and competition
Club	Season	League			State league		National cup (Note: Includes Copa do Brasil and Suomen Cup)		League cup		Continental		Total	
Club	Season	Division	Apps	Goals	Apps	Goals	Apps	Goals	Apps	Goals	Apps	Goals	Apps	Goals
Bahia de Feira	2019	Série D	0	0	11 (Note: Includes Campeonato Baiano)	2	—		—		—		11	2
Vitória (loan)	2019	Série B	8	0	—		—		0 (Note: Includes Copa do Nordeste)	0	—		8	0
Vitória	2020	Série B	0	0	6	1	—		—		—		6	1
Vitória	2021	Série B	18	0	5	0	6	1	8	0	—		37	1
Vitória	Total		18	0	11	1	6	1	8	0	—		43	2
Juventude (loan)	2020	Série B	25	0	2 (Note: Includes Campeonato Gaúcho Série A2)	0	5	0	—		—		32	0
KuPS	2022	Veikkausliiga	23	6	—		5	4	4 (Note: Includes Finnish League Cup)	1	6 (Note: Includes UEFA Europa Conference League)	1	38	12
KuPS	2023	Veikkausliiga	23	2	—		3	1	6	0	2	0	44	3
KuPS	Total		46	8	—		8	5	10	1	8	1	72	15
Paysandu	2024	Série B	1	0	11 (Note: Includes Campeonato Paraense)	0	2	0	2 (Note: Includes Copa Verde)	0	—		16	0
Guarani	2024	Série B	20	2	—		—		—		—		20	2
Botafogo-SP	2025	Série B	27	1	11 (Note: Includes Campeonato Paulista)	0	0	0	—		—		38	1
Foshan Nanshi	2026	China League One	10	4	—		0	0	—		—		10	4
Career total			156	15	46	3	21	6	20	1	8	1	250	26

== Honours ==
Bahia de Feira

- Campeonato Baiano runner-up: 2019

KuPS

- Veikkausliiga runner-up: 2022, 2023
- Finnish Cup: 2022

Paysandu

- Campeonato Paraense: 2024

Individual

- Campeonato Brasileiro Série B: The Defensive Midfielder of the Season: 2021
