= Tim Martinen =

Finnish footballer (born 1999)

Personal information
- Date of birth: 28 November 1999 (age 26)
- Place of birth: Finland
- Position: Midfielder

Team information
- Current team: Atlantis
- Number: 20

Youth career
- –2016: FC Kuusysi
- 2017–2018: FC Lahti

Senior career*
Years	Team	Apps	(Gls)
2018–2020	FC Lahti	5	(0)
2019	→ FC Reipas (loan)	2	(2)
2019	→ AC Kajaani (loan)	10	(2)
2021–	Atlantis	6	(0)
- * Club domestic league appearances and goals as of 23 October 2021

Tim Martinen (born 28 November 1999) is a Finnish professional footballer who plays for Atlantis as a midfielder.
