= Roni Pietsalo =

Finnish footballer (born 2002)

Personal information
- Date of birth: 9 March 2002 (age 24)
- Place of birth: Finland
- Height: 1.83 m (6 ft 0 in)
- Position: Midfielder

Team information
- Current team: Haka
- Number: 17

Youth career
- –2018: TP-47
- 2019: RoPS

Senior career*
| Years | Team | Apps | (Gls) |
| 2018 | TP-47 | 1 | (0) |
| 2019–2021 | RoPS II | 53 | (9) |
| 2021 | RoPS | 1 | (0) |
| 2022 | KPV | 20 | (0) |
| 2023–2025 | EIF | 51 | (5) |
| 2026– | Haka | 14 | (4) |
- * Club domestic league appearances and goals as of 1 November 2026

Roni Pietsalo (born 9 March 2002) is a Finnish professional footballer who plays as a midfielder for Ykkösliiga club Haka.

== Honours ==
EIF

- Ykkönen: 2023
