= Jimmy Sundman =

Finnish footballer (born 1989)

Personal information
- Date of birth: 7 March 1989 (age 37)
- Height: 1.72 m (5 ft 7 1/2 in)
- Position: Forward

Team information
- Current team: SIFFK
- Number: 14

Youth career
- Sunds IF

Senior career*
Years	Team	Apps	(Gls)
2007–2009	SIFFK		
2009–2010	IFK Mariehamn	3	(0)
2010–	SIFFK		

International career^{‡}
2007–	Åland Islands	9	(1)
- * Club domestic league appearances and goals as of 23 May 2012 ‡ National team caps and goals as of 23 May 2012

Jimmy Sundman (born 7 March 1989) is a Finnish footballer who has played for Finnish Veikkausliiga club IFK Mariehamn.
