= Pipe Sáez =

Spanish footballer

Personal information
- Full name: Felipe Sáez Carrillo
- Date of birth: 19 August 1995 (age 31)
- Place of birth: Madrid, Spain
- Height: 1.73 m (5 ft 8 in)
- Position: Left back

Youth career
- 2003–2011: Rayo Vallecano
- 2011–2014: Real Madrid

Senior career*
Years	Team	Apps	(Gls)
2013–2014	Real Madrid C	1	(0)
2014–2017	SS Reyes	74	(3)
2017–2019	Rayo Vallecano B	65	(5)
2019–2020	SS Reyes	21	(0)
2020	Las Rozas	3	(0)
2021–2022	HIFK	33	(3)
- * Club domestic league appearances and goals

Felipe "Pipe" Sáez Carrillo (born 19 August 1995) is a Spanish former footballer who played as a left-back.

== Career ==
At the age of 16, Sáez joined the youth academy of Real Madrid, from Rayo Vallecano. In 2014, he signed for UD San Sebastián de los Reyes in the Spanish fourth division, helping them earn promotion to the Spanish third division.

Jn 2017, he signed for the reserves of Spanish La Liga side Rayo Vallecano. In 2019, Sáez returned to Sanse in the Spanish third division.

Before the 2021 season, he signed for Finnish team HIFK. On 6 February 2021, Sáez made his debut for HIFK in a 1-0 win over KTP, and scored his first goal for the club during the same match. On 17 July 2022 HIFK announced that Sáez decided to retire as a football player and become a teacher.
