= Samson Ebuka Obioha =

Nigerian footballer (born 1999)

Personal information
- Date of birth: 29 November 1999 (age 26)
- Place of birth: Nigeria
- Height: 1.70 m (5 ft 7 in)
- Position: Centre forward

Team information
- Current team: Ethnikos Neo Keramidi

Senior career*
Years	Team	Apps	(Gls)
2020	Kemi City	16	(10)
2021	MP	26	(10)
2022–2023	SJK	34	(3)
2022–2023	SJK II	12	(3)
2024	Drita	17	(1)
2024	Kavala	10	(1)
2025–	Ethnikos Neo Keramidi	13	(2)
- * Club domestic league appearances and goals as of 5 May 2025

Samson Ebuka Obioha (born 29 November 1999) is a Nigerian professional football player who plays for Super League Greece 2 club Ethnikos Neo Keramidi as a centre forward.

== Career ==
Ebuka started his career in Finland in 2020, playing for Kemi City in the third-tier Kakkonen. Next season, he moved on to second-tier Ykkönen club Mikkelin Palloilijat (MP).

During 2022–2023, Ebuka played for SJK Seinäjoki organisation, for the first team in top-tier Veikkausliiga, and for the academy team in second-tier Ykkönen.

In February 2024, he moved to Kosovo and joined Drita.

For the 2024–25 season, Ebuka signed with Greek club Kavala in Super League Greece 2.

In January 2025, he joined fellow Super League Greece 2 side Ethnikos Neo Keramidi.

== Career statistics ==
As of 5 May 2025

Appearances and goals by club, season and competition
Club	Season	League			National cup (Note: Includes Suomen Cup, Kosovar Cup and Greek Cup)		Continental		Other		Total	
Club	Season	Division	Apps	Goals	Apps	Goals	Apps	Goals	Apps	Goals	Apps	Goals
Kemi City	2020	Kakkonen	16	10	–		–		–		16	10
MP	2021	Ykkönen	26	10	3	1	–		–		29	11
SJK	2022	Veikkausliiga	15	1	0	0	2 (Note: Includes UEFA Europa Conference League)	0	0	0	17	1
SJK	2023	Veikkausliiga	19	2	2	0	–		5 (Note: Includes Finnish League Cup)	1	26	3
SJK	Total		34	3	2	0	2	0	5	1	43	4
SJK Akatemia	2022	Ykkönen	11	2	2	2	–		4 (Note: Includes Ykköscup)	3	17	7
SJK Akatemia	2023	Ykkönen	1	1	–		–		–		1	1
SJK Akatemia	Total		12	3	2	2	0	0	4	3	18	8
Drita	2023–24	Kosovo Superleague	17	1	3	0	–		–		20	1
Kavala	2024–25	Super League Greece 2	10	1	1	0	–		–		11	1
Ethnikos Neo Keramidi	2024–25	Super League Greece 2	13	2	0	0	–		–		13	2
Career total			142	31	10	3	2	0	9	4	164	37
