= Yanga Baliso =

South African soccer player

Personal information
- Date of birth: 27 March 1997 (age 29)
- Place of birth: Cape Town, South Africa
- Height: 1.75 m (5 ft 9 in)
- Position: Midfielder

Team information
- Current team: AC Oulu
- Number: 16

Youth career
- –2016: Cape Town Spurs
- 2016–2019: Orlando Pirates

Senior career*
Years	Team	Apps	(Gls)
2018–2019	→ Cape Umoya United (loan)	11	(1)
2019	Pargas IF	0	(0)
2020–2022	IFK Mariehamn	45	(2)
2023	AC Oulu	8	(0)
- * Club domestic league appearances and goals as of 27 May 2023

Yanga Baliso (born 27 March 1997) is a South African professional soccer player.

== Career ==
In 2016, Baliso joined the youth academy of Orlando Pirates, one of South Africa's most successful clubs.

In 2018, he was sent on loan to Cape Umoya United in the South African second division, here he made 11 league appearances and scored 1 goal.

In 2019, Baliso signed for Finnish fourth division side Pargas IF.

Before the 2020 season, he signed for IFK Mariehamn in the Finnish top flight after trying to join a Swedish team.

He terminated his contract with AC Oulu on 2 June 2023 for personal reasons, and returned to South Africa.
