= Kaapro Moilanen =

Finnish politician

Kaapro Moilanen (7 October 1878, in Pieksämäki – 13 May 1957) was a Finnish schoolteacher, journalist and politician. He served as a Member of the Parliament of Finland from 1927 to 1945, representing the National Coalition Party.
