= Oskar Pihlaja =

Finnish footballer (born 2004)

Personal information
- Date of birth: 29 December 2000 (age 25)
- Place of birth: Finland
- Height: 1.78 m (5 ft 10 in)
- Position: Winger

Team information
- Current team: SJK II
- Number: 4

Youth career
- –2013: Kauhajoen Karhu
- 2013–2018: SJK

Senior career*
Years	Team	Apps	(Gls)
2018–2022	SJK II	77	(16)
2019–2022	SJK	0	(0)
2023	JJK Jyväskylä	25	(8)
2024–2025	Jippo	46	(11)
2026–	SJK II	19	(1)
- * Club domestic league appearances and goals as of 1 November 2026

Oskar Pihlaja (born 29 December 2000) is a Finnish professional footballer who plays as a winger for Ykkösliiga club SJK II.

== Club career ==
Pihlaja joined the SJK youth sector in 2013. He played with SJK Akatemia, and debuted with SJK first team in 2019 Finnish Cup.

On 26 January 2023, he signed with JJK Jyväskylä in the second-tier Ykkönen.

After a season in Jyväskylä, Pihlaja joined Joensuu-based club Jippo in Ykkösliiga for the 2024 season.
