= Eelis Taskila =

Finnish footballer (born 2004)

Personal information
- Date of birth: 2 October 2004 (age 22)
- Place of birth: Tornio, Finland
- Height: 1.90 m (6 ft 3 in)
- Position: Centre-back

Youth career
- 2008–2019: TP-47
- 2019–2021: RoPS

Senior career*
| Years | Team | Apps | (Gls) |
| 2021–2022 | RoPS II | 12 | (1) |
| 2022 | RoPS | 18 | (0) |
| 2023–2024 | OLS | 12 | (0) |
| 2023–2024 | AC Oulu | 11 | (0) |
| 2025 | RoPS | 4 | (0) |

International career^{‡}
| 2022 | Finland U18 | 3 | (0) |
Medal record
AC Oulu
| Second place | Finnish League Cup | 2023 |
- * Club domestic league appearances and goals as of 12 June 2024 ‡ National team caps and goals as of 11 October 2023

Eelis Taskila (born 2 October 2004) is a Finnish professional footballer who plays as a centre-back.

== Club career ==
Taskila signed with Veikkausliiga club AC Oulu on 4 November 2022, on a two-year deal with an option for a further year. His contract was terminated by mutual agreement on 31 July 2024, on player's initiative.

== Honours ==
=== AC Oulu ===
- Finnish League Cup: 2023 Runners-up

=== OLS ===
- Kakkonen, Group C: 2023
