= Ntonalnto Atska =

Greek-born Albanian footballer (born 1997)

Personal information
- Full name: Ntonalnto Atska
- Date of birth: 17 September 1997 (age 29)
- Place of birth: Filippiada, Greece
- Height: 1.78 m (5 ft 10 in)
- Position: Defensive midfielder

Team information
- Current team: Apollon Kalamarias
- Number: 24

Senior career*
Years	Team	Apps	(Gls)
2015	AO Simantron	0	(0)
2016–2017	Ethnikos Filippiada	0	(0)
2017–2018	Karaiskakis	2	(0)
2018–2020	Luftëtari FC	41	(1)
2020	Politehnica Iași	8	(0)
2021	Universitatea Cluj	10	(0)
2021–2022	Haka	33	(3)
2023–2024	Gjilani	31	(1)
2024–2026	Lokomotiv Sofia	26	(0)
2026–	Apollon Kalamarias	0	(0)
- * Club domestic league appearances and goals as of 11 June 2026

Ntonalnto Atska (Greek: Ντόναλντο Άτσκα; Albanian: Donaldo Açka; born 17 September 1997) is a Greek-Albanian professional footballer who plays as a defensive midfielder for Super League Greece 2 club Apollon Kalamarias. In his career, Atska also played for clubs such as Luftëtari FC, FC Haka and Politehnica Iași, among others.

== Career statistics ==
As of 26 February 2025

Appearances and goals by club, season and competition
Club	Season	League			Cup (Note: Includes Suomen Cup)		League cup (Note: Includes Finnish League Cup)		Europe		Total	
Club	Season	Division	Apps	Goals	Apps	Goals	Apps	Goals	Apps	Goals	Apps	Goals
Karaiskakis	2017–18	Football League Greece	2	0	–		–		–		2	0
Luftëtari FC	2018–19	Kategoria Superiore	17	0	5	0	–		1 (Note: Appearance(s) in UEFA Europa League)	0	23	0
Luftëtari FC	2019–20	Kategoria Superiore	24	1	4	0	–		–		28	1
Luftëtari FC	Total		41	1	9	0	0	0	1	0	51	1
Politehnica Iași	2020–21	Liga I	8	0	0	0	–		–		8	0
U Cluj	2020–21	Liga II	10	0	2	0	–		–		12	0
Haka	2021	Veikkausliiga	10	2	–		–		–		10	2
Haka	2022	Veikkausliiga	23	1	4	1	4	0	–		31	2
Haka	Total		33	3	4	1	4	0	0	0	41	4
Gjilani	2023–24	Kosovo Superleague	31	1	1	0	–		–		32	1
Lokomotiv Sofia	2024–25	Bulgarian First League	17	0	1	0	–		–		18	0
Career total			142	5	17	1	4	0	1	0	164	6
