= Tino Palmasto =

Finnish footballer (born 1998)

Personal information
- Date of birth: 9 October 1998 (age 28)
- Place of birth: Finland
- Height: 1.93 m (6 ft 4 in)
- Position: Centre back

Team information
- Current team: JäPS
- Number: 2

Youth career
- –2014: PK Keski-Uusimaa
- 2015–2017: Honka

Senior career*
Years	Team	Apps	(Gls)
2017–2018	Honka II	6	(0)
2019–2022	HIFK	14	(2)
2019	→ MyPa (loan)	14	(0)
2020	→ GrIFK (loan)	5	(3)
2022	→ JäPS (loan)	18	(1)
2023–	JäPS	44	(1)
- * Club domestic league appearances and goals as of 24 November 2025

Tino Palmasto (born 9 October 1998) is a Finnish professional footballer who plays as a centre back for Ykkösliiga club Järvenpään Palloseura (JäPS).

== Club career ==
On 28 January 2019, Palmasto signed with HIFK in Veikkausliiga. He was loaned out to MYPA on 13 July 2019. On 31 March 2022, he was sent on loan to JäPS in second-tier Ykkönen. After the season, his deal with JäPS was made permanent.
