= Roan Nogha =

Cameroonian footballer (born 2004)

Personal information
- Full name: Raymond Roan Nogha Nogha
- Date of birth: 12 March 2004 (age 22)
- Place of birth: Yaoundé, Cameroon
- Height: 1.85 m (6 ft 1 in)
- Position: Defensive midfielder

Team information
- Current team: Baník Ostrava

Senior career*
Years	Team	Apps	(Gls)
2022–2026	Nkufo Academy		
2022	→ AC Oulu (loan)	13	(0)
2022	→ OLS (loan)	8	(2)
2023–2024	→ Vlašim (loan)	36	(1)
2024–2026	→ Baník Ostrava (loan)	0	(0)
2024–2026	→ Baník Ostrava B (loan)	46	(5)
2026–	Baník Ostrava	0	(0)
- * Club domestic league appearances and goals as of 2 July 2026

Raymond Roan Nogha Nogha (born 12 March 2004) is a Cameroonian professional football player who plays for Czech First League club Baník Ostrava.

== Club career ==
Born in Yaoundé, Cameroon, Nogha has played for the local football academy Nkufo.

On 1 April 2022, Nogha was loaned out to Finnish Veikkausliiga club AC Oulu. He made his senior debut on 17 April 2022 for AC Oulu in the league, in a 2–2 draw against Ilves. During the season, he also played for the club's reserve team Oulun Luistinseura (OLS) in third-tier Kakkonen.

In early 2023, he moved to Czech Republic and signed a loan contract with Sellier & Bellot Vlašim in the country's second-tier. Later his loan deal was extended for the 2023–24 season.

On 19 July 2024, it was announced that Nogha was sent on loan to Baník Ostrava for the 2024–25 Czech First League season.

On 2 July 2026, Nogha signed a three-year contract with Baník Ostrava.

== Career statistics ==
As of 25 May 2025

Appearances and goals by club, season and competition
Club	Season	Division	League		Cup (Note: Includes Suomen Cup and Czech Cup)		League cup		Europe		Total	
Club	Season	Division	Apps	Goals	Apps	Goals	Apps	Goals	Apps	Goals	Apps	Goals
AC Oulu (loan)	2022	Veikkausliiga	13	0	4	2	0	0	–		17	2
OLS (loan)	2022	Kakkonen	8	2	–		–		–		8	2
Vlašim (loan)	2022–23	FNL	11	0	–		–		–		11	0
Vlašim (loan)	2023–24	FNL	25	1	2	0	–		–		27	1
Vlašim (loan)	Total		36	1	2	0	0	0	0	0	38	1
Baník Ostrava (loan)	2024–25	Czech First League	0	0	0	0	–		–		0	0
Baník Ostrava B (loan)	2024–25	FNL	18	3	–		–		–		18	3
Career total			75	6	6	2	0	0	0	0	81	8
