= Jakob Gottberg =

Finnish footballer (born 2002)

Personal information
- Full name: Jakob Carl Anton Gottberg
- Date of birth: 20 July 2002 (age 24)
- Place of birth: Finland
- Position: Winger

Team information
- Current team: EIF
- Number: 25

Youth career
- –2017: EIF

Senior career*
| Years | Team | Apps | (Gls) |
| 2017–2021 | EIF Akademi | 53 | (7) |
| 2019–2021 | EIF | 24 | (3) |
| 2021 | Ytterhogdals IK | | |
| 2022 | EIF | 7 | (0) |
| 2022 | EIF Akademi | 9 | (5) |
| 2023 | AB Argir | 8 | (0) |
| 2023 | AB Argir II | 5 | (6) |
| 2023– | EIF | 22 | (0) |
| 2023– | EIF Akademi | 7 | (0) |
- * Club domestic league appearances and goals as of 31 July 2025

Jakob Carl Anton Gottberg (born 20 July 2002) is a Finnish professional footballer who plays as a winger for Ykkösliiga club Ekenäs IF (EIF).

== Club career ==
Gottberg is a product of Ekenäs IF youth sector.

In February 2023, Gottberg signed with AB Argir in Faroe Islands Premier League. He returned to Finland in July and signed with EIF. At the end of the season, the club won the Ykkönen title and a promotion to Veikkausliiga, and on 14 November 2023, his contract with EIF was extended.

== Honours ==
EIF

- Ykkönen: 2023
