= Laaksolahti =

Laaksolahti Dalsvik
- District of Espoo
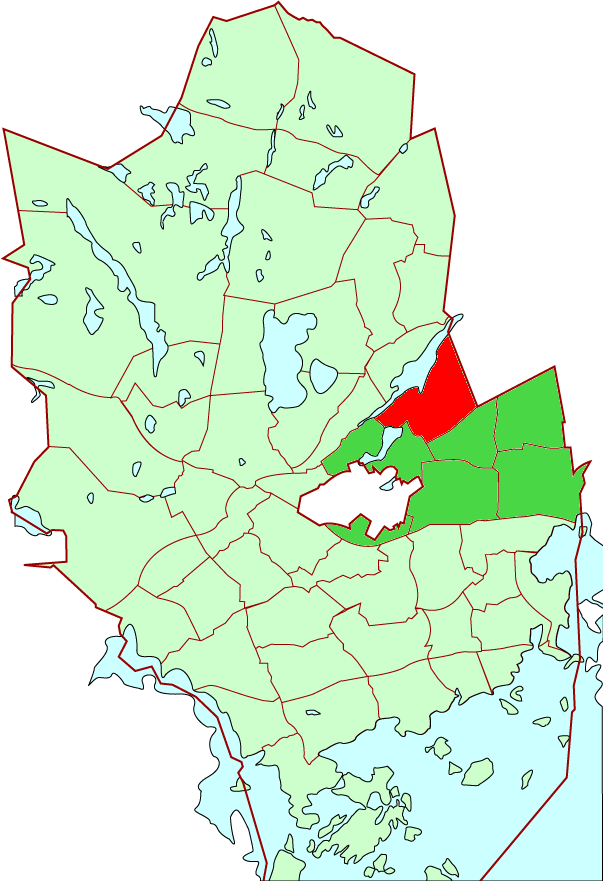
- Location of Laaksolahti within Espoo
- Coordinates: 60°15′N 24°46′E
- Country: Finland
- Municipality: Espoo
- Region: Uusimaa
- Sub-region: Greater Helsinki
- Main District: Suur-Leppävaara
- Inner District(s): Veini, Lähderanta, Jupperi

Population (2006)
  - Total: 9,313

Languages
  - Finnish: 90.0 %
  - Swedish: 7.9 %
  - Other: 2.1 %
- Jobs: 1,102

Laaksolahti (Finnish) or Dalsvik (Swedish) is a district of Espoo, a city in Finland.

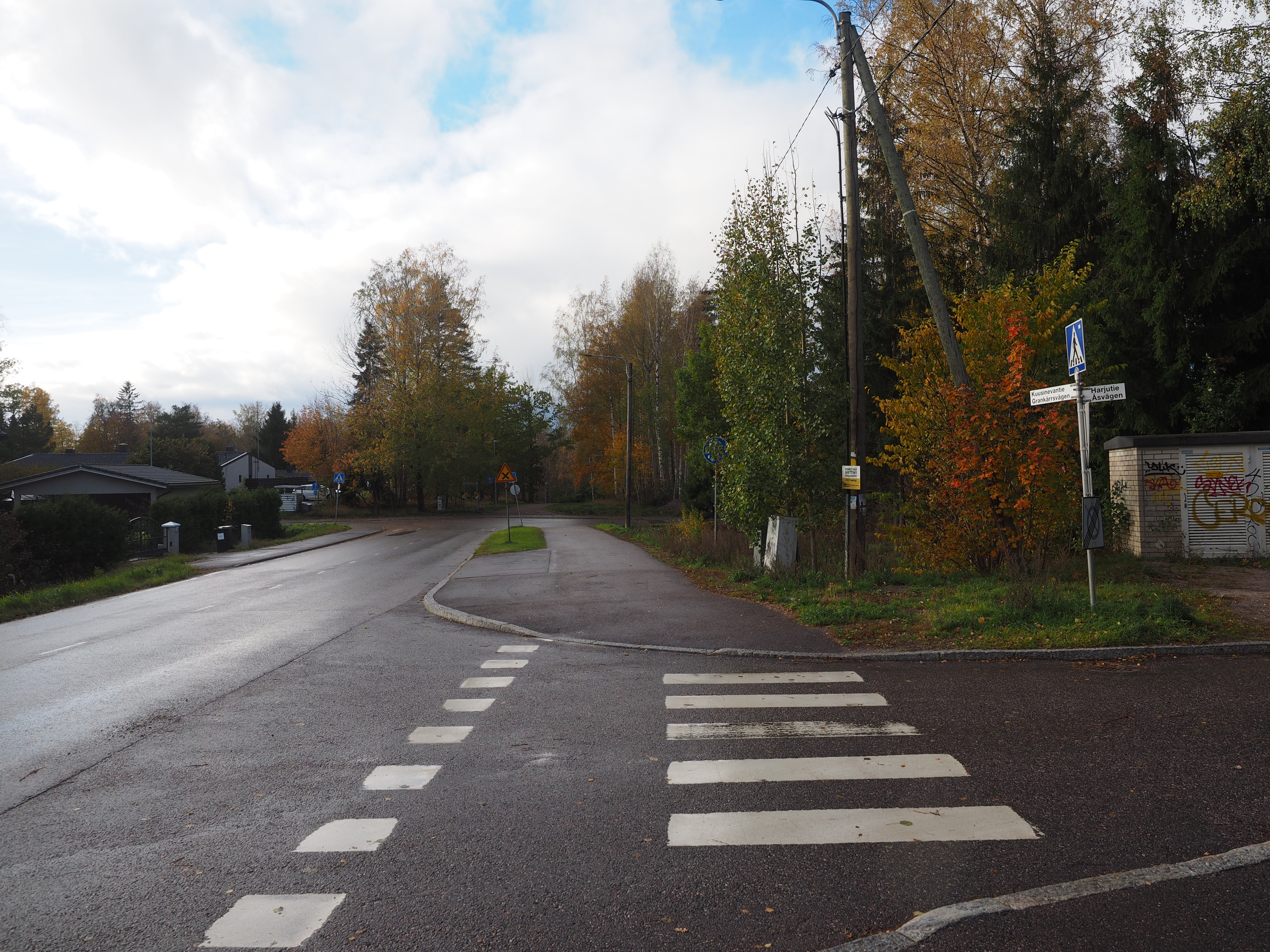
Laaksolahti on an October afternoon.

== See also ==
- Districts of Espoo
