= Albin Björkskog =

Finnish footballer (born 2004)

Personal information
- Date of birth: 16 November 2004 (age 21)
- Place of birth: Finland
- Height: 1.82 m (6 ft 0 in)
- Position: Right winger

Team information
- Current team: SJK
- Number: 11

Youth career
- Larsmo Bollklubb
- Jaro

Senior career*
Years	Team	Apps	(Gls)
2020–2023	JBK	33	(6)
2021–2025	Jaro	95	(13)
2026–	SJK	0	(0)

International career
2022	Finland U18	3	(0)
- * Club domestic league appearances and goals as of 26 July 2026

Albin Björkskog (born 16 November 2004) is a Finnish professional footballer who plays for Veikkausliiga club SJK as a right winger.

== Career ==
Björkskog scored his first goal in Veikkausliiga for Jaro on 26 April 2025, in a 3–2 home loss against KTP.

== Career statistics ==
As of 26 July 2026

Appearances and goals by club, season and competition
Club	Season	League			Cup (Note: Includes Suomen Cup)		League cup (Note: Includes Ykköscup, Ykkösliigacup and Finnish League Cup)		Total	
Club	Season	Division	Apps	Goals	Apps	Goals	Apps	Goals	Apps	Goals
Jaro Akademi	2020	Nelonen	2	0	–		–		2	0
Jaro Akademi	2021	Nelonen	2	1	–		–		2	1
Jaro Akademi	2023	Kolmonen	1	1	–		–		1	1
Jaro Akademi	2024	Kolmonen	1	0	–		–		1	0
Jaro Akademi	Total		6	2	0	0	0	0	6	2
Jakobstads BK	2020	Kakkonen	7	0	–		–		7	0
Jakobstads BK	2021	Kakkonen	14	3	–		–		14	3
Jakobstads BK	2022	Kakkonen	7	0	–		–		7	0
Jakobstads BK	2023	Kakkonen	5	3	–		–		5	3
Jakobstads BK	Total		33	6	0	0	0	0	33	6
Jaro	2021	Ykkönen	21	1	2	1	–		23	2
Jaro	2022	Ykkönen	16	4	2	0	4	1	22	5
Jaro	2023	Ykkönen	8	0	0	0	0	0	8	0
Jaro	2024	Ykkösliiga	26	4	1	0	6	2	33	6
Jaro	2025	Veikkausliiga	26	4	4	2	5	0	35	6
Jaro	Total		97	13	9	3	15	3	121	19
SJK	2026	Veikkausliiga	0	0	0	0	2	0	2	0
Career total			136	21	9	3	17	3	162	26

== Honours ==
Jaro

- Ykkösliiga runner-up: 2024
