= Ville Moilanen =

Finnish footballer (born 1999)

Personal information
- Date of birth: 27 April 1999 (age 27)
- Place of birth: Finland
- Position: Midfielder

Team information
- Current team: Kemi City
- Number: 11

Senior career*
Years	Team	Apps	(Gls)
2014–2015	PS Kemi	19	(1)
2015	→ Gnistan (loan)	3	(0)
2015–2017	Bradford City	0	(0)
2017	TP-47	10	(1)
2018	PS Kemi	29	(1)
2019–2020	TP-47	20	(3)
2021–	Kemi City	22	(10)
- * Club domestic league appearances and goals as of 10:27, 3 November 2021 (UTC)

Ville Moilanen (born 27 April 1999) is a Finnish professional footballer who plays as a midfielder for Kemi City.

== Career ==
In September 2015, Moilanen joined Bradford City on a two-year deal.

In April 2021, Moilanen rejoined Kemi City, now playing in the Kakkonen.
