= 2023 Finnish Cup =

Tournament details
- Country: Finland
- Teams: 333

Final positions
- Champions: Ilves
- Runners-up: Honka

Tournament statistics
- Matches played: 329
- Goals scored: 1,602 (4.87 per match)

The 2023 Finnish Cup was the 69th season of the Finnish Cup football competition. The winners qualified for the 2024–25 Conference League second qualifying round.

Ilves won the cup on 30 September 2023 with a 2–1 win over Honka, their fourth Finnish Cup win.

== Calendar ==
Round	Dates	Draw	Number of fixtures	Clubs
Round 0	17 February – 12 March 2023	20 January	33	66 → 33 +215
First round	17 February – 25 March 2023	20 January	124	248 → 124
Second round	19 March – 10 April 2023	14 March	62	124 →62 +46 from Veikkausliiga, Ykkönen, Kakkonen
Third round	26 April – 8 May 2023	14 April	54	108 → 54 +2 from Veikkausliiga(League Cup)
Fourth round	17–21 May 2023	4 May	28	56 → 28 +4 from Veikkausliiga(UEFA Competitions)
Fifth round	31 May – 1 June 2023	23 May	16	32 → 16
Sixth round	19–21 June 2023	6 June	8	16 → 8
Quarter-finals	5 July 2023	6 June	4	8 → 4
Semi-finals	23 August 2023	11 July	2	4 → 2
Final	30 September 2023		1	2 → 1

== Format ==
The cup was played as a one legged knockout tournament. A total of 333 teams participated. Lower league teams received home advantage until the fourth round. Teams were divided into geographical groups for the draw until 5th round.

== Round 0 ==
66 teams participate in this round.

Number of teams per tier still in competition
Veikkausliiga (1)	Ykkönen (2)	Kakkonen (3)	Kolmonen (4)	Nelonen (5)	Vitonen (6)	Kutonen (7)	Seiska (8)	M35 (+35)	Total
12 / 12	12 / 12	28 / 28	73 / 73	73 / 73	82 / 82	39 / 39	7 / 7	7 / 7	333 / 333

=== Group 1 ===
25 February 2023	FC Spital (6)	4–0	Millbrook FC (6)	Helsinki
	Merras 5', 15'; Ei Furuholm 11'; Kannas 83'	Report		Stadium: Töölön Pallokenttä; Referee: Lucinilton Ferreira

25 February 2023	AC StaSi (7)	2–4	HeMan (7)	Helsinki
	Taimouri 16'; A Manninen 43'	Report	Launiala 6', 60'; Lindfors 13'; Kleemola 72'	Stadium: Töölön Pallokenttä; Referee: Lucinilton Ferreira

4 March 2023	SAPA/2 (6)	4–0	FC Korso/United (6)	Helsinki
	Kivikataja 40'; Own Goal 44'; Laurinkari 50'; Hatara 72'	Report		Stadium: Töölön Pallokenttä; Referee: Otso Simola

4 March 2023	Kauklahden Pyrintö (6)	1–0	MPS/Atletico Akatemia (6)	Espoonlahti, Espoo
	Väisänen 37'	Report		Stadium: Espoonlahti; Referee: Arto Vanninen

10 March 2023	I-HK/Sensaatio (6)	1–1 (3–4 p)	FC Pehmeet ja Märät (6)	Vantaa
	Huhtinen 41'	Report	Holmborg 78'	Stadium: Kalmuurihalli; Attendance: 20; Referee: Jasmine Kaur

11 March 2023	Pöxyt/TN (6)	3–6	LePa/2 (6)	Espoo
	Fagerroos 27'; Aalto 69'; Malik 90'	Report	Erälinna 1'; Keinänen 20'; Own Goal 33'; E Hirvonen 50', 79', 87'	Stadium: Keski-Espoo; Attendance: 20; Referee: Niklas Heikkonen

12 March 2023	Nikinmäki United (6)	1–0	FC Inter Vuosaari (6)	Vantaa
	Lehtoranta 90+1'	Report		Stadium: Tikkurila; Attendance: 20; Referee: Sami Juselius

=== Group 2 ===
19 February 2023	Colo-Colo (6)	7–1	KoiPS/Dynamo (6)	Helsinki
	J Latva 2', 7'; Laakso 47'; Granholm 60', 66'; Sulonen 69', 75'	Report	Hirvi 24'	Stadium: Töölön Pallokenttä; Referee: Mohamed Abdelgayed

26 February 2023	Helsingin Ponnistus/Peruskallio(7)	0–9	HJK/Kantsu (6)	Helsinki
	Nelimarkka (red card) 87'	Report	Astala 2'; Ellonen 17'; Halonen 30'; Kontio 38'; Ali-Hokka 64', 79', 80', 89'; Salomäki 88'	Stadium: Töölön Pallokenttä; Referee: Lucinilton Ferreira

26 February 2023	MLHF(7)	2–1	AC Rastaala (6)	Espoo
	Gutierrez Garcia 60'; Sjöstedt 82'	Report	Muhonen 18'; Soiluva (red card) 80'	Stadium: Laaksolahti; Attendance: 15; Referee: Niklas Heikkonen

4 March 2023	TiPS/Legends (7)	1–1 (2–4 p)	FC Samba (7)	Vantaa
	Nirkko 76'	Report	Koivisto 21'	Stadium: Tikkurila; Referee: Elias Juvonen

4 March 2023	Afro Foot Club (6)	2–3	Helsingin Ponnistus/2 (6)	Helsinki
	Ceesay 81', 90+5'	Report	Palovesi 20'; Knape 48', 76'	Stadium: Töölön Pallokenttä; Referee: Larbi Boughdiri

5 March 2023	Strikers/Bertil (7)	0–4	SAPA/Savanna (6)	Helsinki
		Report	Anttila 22'; Määttänen 70'; Säilä 82'; Miguel 89'	Stadium: Töölön Pallokenttä; Attendance: 30; Referee: Mohamed Abdelgayed

6 March 2023	HIFK/3 (6)	1–6	Gnistan/M35(+35)	Helsinki
	Huovinen 75'	Report	Hölttä 18'; Murto 21', 47', 50'; Sihvola 36'; Markkanen 51'	Stadium: Oulunkylä; Attendance: 20; Referee: Erdal Karsandi

12 March 2023	FC Pakila (8)	0–3	Pakkalan Palloseura (5)	Vantaa
		Report	Lehtonen 42'; Niemi 44'; Chauhan 45'	Stadium: Myyrmäen Jalkapallostadion; Attendance: 15; Referee: Seidou Balla

=== Group 3 ===
23 February 2023	Torre Calcio 2 (7)	0–2	Turun Pallo-Veikot (7)	Turku
	Rantasalmi (red card) 90+3'	Report	Ahtikoski 31'; Seker 65'	Stadium: Kupittaa Tekonurmi; Attendance: 100; Referee: Sarmad Lmati

26 February 2023	Littoisten Työväen Urheilijat (6)	6–0	FC Boda (6)	Kaarina
	Uusitalo 3', 32'; Tuomi 20'; Rivinoja 24'; Salonen 38'; Bardhi 74'	Report		Stadium: Puuha-areena; Attendance: 35; Referee: Alexandrer Hägestrand

4 March 2023	Turun Nappulaliiga (7)	7–1	FC Inter/M35 (+35)	Turku
	Emadi 9'; Molayemi 20'; Kanniainen 28', 65'; Laitinen 44'; Eskola 62', 75'	Report	Hemmilä 51'	Stadium: Kupittaa Tekonurmi; Referee: Niilo Heikkinen

4 March 2023	AFC Campus (6)	2–3	FC Ruskon Pallo (6)	Turku
	Bäckström 8'; Haahkola 35'	Report	Lehtinen 37'; Oksa 54'; Kakko 71'	Stadium: Turku Energia Areena; Referee: Sarmad Lmati

8 March 2023	TPS/M35 (+35)	8–1	Kuuvuoren Laaki (6)	Turku
	Heinikangas 9'; Ääritalo 24'; Kuisma 27', 55'; Hyyrynen 48'; Saksa 65', 90'; Hakala 70'	Report	Own goal 90'	Stadium: Kupittaa Tekonurmi; Attendance: 10; Referee: Santeri Ojala

9 March 2023	Liedon Pallo (6)	2–3	Torre Calcio (6)	Naantali
	Aaltonen 53'; Kinnunen 67'	Report	Hedman 37'; Saari 56'; Raaska 65'	Stadium: Karvetti; Attendance: 20; Referee: Ari-Petteri Finnberg

=== Group 4 ===
2 March 2023	Viinikan Pallo (8)	1–10	FC Kangasala (6)	Tampere
	Anh Tuan 36'	Report	Luoma 4'; Niemi 7', 84'; Lehtola 18'; Manninen 30'; Palmu 39'; Venetjoki 66', 88'; Halme 68'; Lehto 69'	Stadium: Kauppi 1 Attendance: 13; Referee: Juha Kivistö

3 March 2023	Ilves/3 (7)	1–5	Fish United (6)	Tampere
	Juntunen 36'	Report	Palohuhta 4', 47', 80'; Myllymäki 22', 62'	Stadium: Kauppi 1 Referee: Hannu Pajunen

4 March 2023	Porin Palloilijat (6)	3–3 (4–5 p)	FC Harjavallan Pallo (6)	Pori
	Haapala 17'; Karonen 31'; Llajo 34'	Report	Kestinmäki (?); Lähdeviita 45', 56'	Stadium: Urheilukeskus; Attendance: 25; Referee: Aaro Ollila

4 March 2023	LaVe/KPR (7)	0–4	Oriveden Tuisku (6)	Hämeenlinna
		Report	Koskinen 48', 72'; Saramäki 55'; Maunu 77'	Stadium: Säästöpankki Areena; Attendance: 25; Referee: Pasi Uschanov

10 March 2023	FC Haka-j/Musta (7)	0–13	Ilves/4 (6)	Valkeakoski
		Report	J Palo 5', 22'; Harala 28', 65'; Jokinen 29'; M Palo 34', 36'; Uimonen 38', 87'; Juntunen 60'; Sandt 82'; Åhlgren 83', 84'	Stadium: Palloiluhalli; Attendance: 10; Referee: Mikko Lähteenmäki

11 March 2023	FC Helmi Jätkä (8)	1–2	FC Ulvila (6)	Tampere
	Ollgren 57'	Report	Koskenniemi 4'; Munkki 76'; Nikkanen (red card) 45+1'	Stadium: Kauppi 1 Attendance: 50; Referee: Hannu Pajunen

Messukylä United (7)	w/o	Janakkalan Pallo (7)
	Report

=== Group 5 ===
Hausjärven Pallojuniorit (7)	w/o	JäPS/United (7)
	Report

=== Group 6 ===
19 February 2023	Flamingo United (7)	1–9	JaPS/M35 (+35)	Lahti
	Chaouki 18'	Report	Artoma 4'; Hietanen 9', 44', 45+2'; Shala 13'; Hukka 41'; Iikkanen 55'; Sassila 86'; Kinnunen 88'	Stadium: Mukkulan Halli; Attendance: 47; Referee: Tero Juurinen

28 February 2023	Nastolan Naseva (7)	2–2 (1–4 p)	Jäntevä/Akatemia (6)	Nastola
	Ihalainen 27', 43'	Report	Own goal 41'; Kolehmainen 76'	Stadium: Pajulahti Halli; Attendance: 50; Referee: Antti Heikkinen

=== Group 7 ===
5 March 2023	Juniori STPS (6)	5–3	Luonetjärven Varuskunnan Urheilijat (6)	Savonlinna
	Keller 30', 57'; Di 50'; Sairanen 82', 90+3'	Report	Rajaniemi 13'; Toivonen 17'; Koskinen 67'	Stadium: Tanhuvaara Halli; Attendance: 10; Referee: Wali Avent

5 March 2023	Konneveden Urheilijat (7)	2–1	FC Marski (6)	Äänekoski
	Kääriäinen 54'; Tani 80'	Report	Niemi 66'	Stadium: Ylipainehalli; Referee: Aki Oinonen

== Round 1 ==
Number of teams per tier still in competition
Veikkausliiga (1)	Ykkönen (2)	Kakkonen (3)	Kolmonen (4)	Nelonen (5)	Vitonen (6)	Kutonen (7)	Seiska (8)	M35 (+35)	Total
12 / 12	12 / 12	28 / 28	73 / 73	73 / 73	66 / 82	27 / 39	4 / 7	6 / 7	300 / 333

=== Group 1 ===
24 February 2023	FC Kontu/TDJ (7)	0–22	Etelä-Espoon Pallo (4)	Helsinki
		Report	Roivainen 8', 38', 39', 47', 78'; Nieminen 12', 48', 61'; Lehtinen 28'; Aalto 37', 42', 46'; Nissinen 40', 53'; Yeboah 45'; Jonas 66', 89'; Baslakov 73', 88'; Olili 75', 80'; Nshimiyimana 77'	Stadium: Kartano; Attendance: 21; Referee: Mikko Särkiniemi

25 February 2023	LPS/2 (6)	2–10	HooGee (5)	Helsinki
	Auvinen 54'; Kiljunen 87'	Report	Johansson 18', 40'; Hollfast 30'; Langhoff 31', 66', 85'; Lindroos 37'; Own goal 37'; Hauvala 56'; Von Weissenberg 82'	Stadium: Kartano; Attendance: 20; Referee: Niklas Heikkonen

25 February 2023	ToTe/Taiskin Tykit (6)	2–2 (4–2 p)	Toukolan Teräs/2022 (4)	Helsinki
	Wirén 25'; Andersson 90+4'	Report	O'Sillah 65', 78'	Stadium: Töölön Pallokenttä; Attendance: 15; Referee: Mohamed Abdelgayed

1 March 2023	PETO (5)	1–2	Gnistan/Ogeli (4)	Helsinki
	Parkkari 19'	Report	Own goal 27'; Petäjä 67'	Stadium: Oulunkylä; Referee: Kalle Pitkänen

3 March 2023	SAPA (4)	0–5	Malmin Palloseura (4)	Helsinki
		Report	Own goal 3'; Tukiainen 22'; Lindqvist 37'; Pimiä 43'; Talka 67'	Stadium: Töölön Pallokenttä; Referee: Mikko Mörö

4 March 2023	Kilo IF/1 (7)	1–2	FC POHU (5)	Espoo
	Ivonen 9'	Report	Segerstråle 67'; Huovinen 90+7'	Stadium: Espoonlahti; Attendance: 26; Referee: Abdirisag Ahmed

4 March 2023	FC Viikingit (6)	0–4	VJS/2 (5)	Vantaa
		Report	Souris 45+3', 52', 68'; Mustonen 87'	Stadium: Aktia Areena; Attendance: 50; Referee: Lauri Kurki

18 March 2023	PEP (6)	0–3	SAPA/2 (6)	Espoo
		Report	Muhire 5'; Kivikataja 39'; Hatara 75'	Stadium: Laaksolahti halli Referee: Larbi Boughdiri

18 March 2023	Tavastia (6)	0–0 (7–6 p)	LePa/2 (6)	Helsinki
		Report		Stadium: Talin halli Referee: Erdal Karsandi

18 March 2023	Puotinkylän Valtti (4)	0–2	Koivukylän Palloseura (4)	Vantaa
		Report	Nariman 74'; Karppinen 86'	Stadium: Myyrmäki-halli; Attendance: 35; Referee: Mohamed Abdelgayed

18 March 2023	PK-35/Äijät (8)	0–3	ToTe/Keparoi (7)	Helsinki
	Kjäll (red card) 37'; Kouva (red card) 90+1'	Report	Miranda 34'; Luu 45+5'; Nirhamo 90+3'	Stadium: Kartano; Attendance: 35; Referee: Juha Isosomppi

Club Latino Espanol (5)	w/o	Helsingin Palloseura (4)
	Report

19 March 2023	FC POHU/Hurjin (5)	0–2	PPS/Old Stars (5)	Helsinki
		Report	Own goal 49'; Raci 65'	Stadium: Töölön Pallokenttä; Attendance: 3 Referee: Jasmine Stubbe

20 March 2023	LePa/M35 (+35)	1–4	Helsingin Ponnistus (5)	Espoo
	Lindqvist 82'; Rosenholm (red card) 56'	Report	Nousiainen 68'; Memonen 70'; Smith 73'; Mohamed 87'	Stadium: Keski-Espoo; Referee: Erdal Karsandi

23 March 2023	Esbo Bollklubb (4)	2–1	HIFK/2 (4)	Espoo
	Hietanen 14'; Koskela 89'	Report	Mijoc 12'	Stadium: Keski-Espoo; Referee: Emil Kohvakka

24 March 2023	Nikinmäki United (6)	1–4	FC Hieho (5)	Helsinki
	Lehtoranta 75'	Report	Rahkonen 20', 26'; Holmberg 54', 68'	Stadium: Töölön Pallokenttä; Attendance: 19; Referee: Markus Lehtola

25 March 2023	FC Pehmeet ja Märät (6)	1–5	PPJ/Lauttasaari (5)	Helsinki
	Holmborg 7'	Report	Jung 1', 59'; Heikkala 31', 64'; Karjalainen 40'	Stadium: Talin halli Referee: James Clay

25 March 2023	FC Spital (6)	1–2	Töölön Vesa (5)	Helsinki
	Furuholm 90'	Report	Honkala 32'; Torkki 90+2'	Stadium: Kartano; Attendance: 8 Referee: Niklas Heikkonen

25 March 2023	Hesperian Mankeli (7)	0–7	Malmin Ponnistajat (4)	Helsinki
		Report	Peltola 3'; Tuovinen 10', 73', 85'; Itkonen 23'; Koskinen 39'; Lehtonen 56'	Stadium: Töölön Pallokenttä; Referee: Lucinilton Ferreira

26 March 2023	LPS/7 (8)	1–1 (2–4 p)	Kauklahden Pyrintö (6)	Helsinki
	Conlin 77'	Report	Kotilainen 42'	Stadium: Töölön Pallokenttä; Attendance: 15; Referee: Lucinilton Ferreira

=== Group 2 ===
10 March 2023	HPS/2 (5)	2–3	GrIFK/U23 (4)	Helsinki
	Pähti 57', 74'	Report	Sormunen 14', 39'; Palmgren 51'	Stadium: Töölön Pallokenttä; Attendance: 53; Referee: Mikko Lipsanen

11 March 2023	ToTe/Tapio (6)	1–10	Puistolan Urheilijat (4)	Helsinki
	Ollila 59'; Girmay (red card) 86'	Report	Ruumensaari 5'; Rinta-Kahila 29', 46', 68'; Lamppu 45', 66', 73', 79', 83'; Talat 45+2'	Stadium: Töölön Pallokenttä; Attendance: 20; Referee: Otto Helin

12 March 2023	Toukolan Teräs (4)	1–0	FC Kontu (4)	Helsinki
	Rantala 22'	Report		Stadium: Töölön Pallokenttä; Attendance: 67; Referee: Elias Juvonen

17 March 2023	Chicken Wings (5)	1–0	Valtti/2 (5)	Helsinki
	Jussila 40'	Report		Stadium: Kartano; Referee: James Clay

17 March 2023	Arkki (6)	2–5	Töölön Taisto (4)	Helsinki
	Vartiainen 20'; Kammonen 70'	Report	Tolvanen 31'; Appelqvist 39', 60'; Own goal 40'; Stude 80'	Stadium: Töölön Pallokenttä; Attendance: 40; Referee: Erdal Karsandi

17 March 2023	FC POHU/Simpsons (5)	0–10	Laajasalon Palloseura (4)	Helsinki
		Report	Vihtola 6'; Rihtniemi 12', 35'; Laitila 40'; Ronimus 51', 64'; Wood 69'; Karjalainen 80'; Kainulainen 86'; Koivisto 88'	Stadium: Töölön Pallokenttä; Attendance: 10; Referee: Elmo Otronen

18 March 2023	Polin Pallo (7)	4–2	HJK/Kantsu (6)	Espoo
	Huhtamäki 67'; Paukku 76', 90+3'; Haapanen 89'	Report	Halonen 22'; Virolainen 47'	Stadium: Keski-Espoon tekonurmi Attendance: 20; Referee: Joni Taipale

18 March 2023	Vietfin FC (7)	0–1	Itä-Hakkilan Kilpa (5)	Vantaa
		Report	Viljus 15'	Stadium: Tikkurila; Referee: Lucinilton Ferreira

18 March 2023	FC Lähiö (8)	0–8	Leppävaaran Pallo (5)	Helsinki
		Report	Lindström 3'; Julin 28'; Sine 36'; Kuuppo 51', 63'; Laitinen 70'; Kuusela 83'; Paavilainen 85'	Stadium: Oulunkylä; Attendance: 37; Referee: Pertti Hokkanen

18 March 2023	Colo-Colo (6)	0–2	MPS/Atletico Malmi (4)	Helsinki
		Report	Lindström 28'; Hasan 80'	Stadium: Töölön Pallokenttä; Referee: Aleksi Merras

18 March 2023	SAPA/Savanna (6)	6–0	MLHF (7)	Helsinki
	Mbengeh 17', 35', 40'; Abdi 72'; Määttänen 86'; Ibrahim 87'	Report	Azmi Helenius (red card) 66'	Stadium: Töölön Pallokenttä; Attendance: 30; Referee: Otto Helin

21 March 2023	Kasiysi (6)	1–1 (3–4 p)	Pakkalan Palloseura (5)	Espoo
	Hintsanen 55'	Report	Hiihtola 42'	Stadium: Laaksolahti; Attendance: 55; Referee: Erdal Karsandi

21 March 2023	Sexypöxyt/M35 (+35)	7–0	FC Finnkurd (4)	Espoo
	Lumivaara 5', 29', 78'; Björkell 20'; Puolakka 64'; Uusimäki 81'; Warner 87'	Report		Stadium: Laaksolahti; Attendance: 30; Referee: Gezim Arifi

21 March 2023	EsPa/Renat (5)	1–2	PPJ/Ruoholahti (4)	Helsinki
	Karttunen 4'	Report	Fagerström 12'; Uotila 83'	Stadium: Intersport Areena; Referee: Mikko Särkiniemi

22 March 2023	Espoon Tikka (5)	0–0 (5–4 p)	Kurvin Vauhti (4)	Espoo
		Report		Stadium: Espoonlahti; Referee: Gezim Arifi

24 March 2023	PK-35/2 (6)	1–3	Laaksolahden Jalkapalloseura (4)	Helsinki
	Pennanen 6'	Report	Pasquale 30'; Karimi 49'; Aso 69'	Stadium: Kartano; Attendance: 45; Referee: Janne Juote

24 March 2023	FC Germania (5)	0–2	SUMU/sob (5)	Helsinki
		Report	Nkiwabonga 32'; Bekaj 58'	Stadium: Töölön pallokenttä Referee: Lucinilton Ferreira

25 March 2023	FC Samba (7)	0–3	FC Dons (6)	Espoo
		Report	Biskop 4', 53'; Thorhallsson 43'	Stadium: Espoonlahti; Referee: Juho Erävuori

26 March 2023	Helsingin Ponnistus/2 (6)	3–0	FC Parseh (6)	Helsinki
	Knape 90+2'	Report	el Kahouayji 3'; Baghjery 23'	Stadium: Töölön Pallokenttä; Attendance: 25; Referee: Mohamed Abdelgayed

27 March 2023	Gnistan/M35 (+35)	0–5	Vantaan Jalkapalloseura (4)	Helsinki
		Report	Hyvärinen 12'; Jmaali 40', 68'; Merinen 42'; Heinonen 54'	Stadium: Oulunkylä; Attendance: 50; Referee: Gezim Arifi

=== Group 3 ===
25 February 2023	FC Åland (4)	0–0 (4–3 p)	Turun Pallokerho (4)	Mariehamn
		Report		Stadium: Wiklöf Holding Arena; Referee: Gustav Mattsson

4 March 2023	Turun Raittius Kerho (5)	3–1	Salpa 2 (5)	Turku
	Ojanperä 43'; Koskinen 47'; Kuusisto 78'	Report	Koskinen 83'	Stadium: Kupittaa; Referee: Petri Johansson

4 March 2023	FC KyPS (6)	0–12	Åbo Club de Futbol (5)	Paimio
		Report	Makkonen 12', 29', 46', 56'; Snicker 23', 33', 63', 85'; Opacic 57', 69', 86'; Lastula 76'	Stadium: Soikka; Attendance: 30; Referee: Teemu Kujanpää

4 March 2023	KuuLa/2 (7)	0–3	Åbo IFK (4)	Turku
		Report	Laine 61'; Honkasalo 63'; Louramo 68'	Stadium: Kupittaa; Referee: Lauri Kuvaja

11 March 2023	Sporting Club Raisio (7)	1–2	Bollklubben-46 (5)	Naantali
	Junttila 3'	Report	Aldali 5', 10'	Stadium: Karvetti; Attendance: 20; Referee: Juha Ruonti

12 March 2023	Littoisten Työväen Urheilijat (6)	3–2	Jyrkkälän Tykit (5)	Kaarina
	Uusitalo 18'; Mäenpää 42'; Heinonen 71'	Report	Paavilainen 1', 65'	Stadium: Puuha-areena; Attendance: 49; Referee: Elvedin Fiso

16 March 2023	Qppis (7)	0–4	Piikkiön Palloseura (5)	Turku
		Report	Elonen 14'; Myllylä 29'; Rastas 61'; Lahtinen 90+1'	Stadium: Kupittaa; Referee: Vili Lehtovaara

17 March 2023	EIF/2 (5)	1–0	Paimion Haka (4)	Ekenäs
	Bushi 85'	Report		Stadium: Keskuskenttä; Referee: Oskari Tuomi

18 March 2023	Turun Kisa-Veikot (6)	0–6	Kaarinan Pojat (4)	Turku
		Report	Abdou 22'; Salminen 36'; Zeqiri 38'; Jussila 53'; Wikström 79'; Valli 86'	Stadium: Kupittaa; Attendance: 30; Referee: Mika Lamppu

18 March 2023	TPK 2 (6)	5–1	FC Ruskon Pallo (6)	Turku
	Djibalene 7', 15', 23', 60'; Minkkinen 85'	Report	Suikki 70'	Stadium: Kupittaa; Referee: Tommi Salmivirta

18 March 2023	FC Hangö Idrottsklubb (5)	0–14	FC Inter 2 (4)	Turku
		Report	Voca 20', 38', 45'; Enbuska 32', 60', 72', 83'; Yasin 54', 74', 87'; Oksanen 62', 63'; Suominen 85'; Bajrami 89'	Stadium: Turku Energia areena Referee: Marios Steliou

19 March 2023	Turun Pallo-Veikot (7)	0–3	MaPS 2 (6)	Turku
		Report	Pakarinen 26', 37', 43'	Stadium: Kupittaa; Attendance: 20; Referee: Vesa-Matti Appelgren

22 March 2023	TPS/M35 (+35)	16–0	Kaarinan Palloseura (6)	Turku
	Hakala 2', 33', 36', 90'; Ääritalo 11', 28', 46', 53', 65', 73', 74'; Hyyrynen 41', 45+1', 51', 55', 82'	Report		Stadium: Kupittaa; Referee: Juho Heikkilä

23 March 2023	Turun Nappulaliiga (7)	1–0	Torre Calcio (6)	Turku
	Kanniainen 2'	Report		Stadium: Kupittaa; Referee: Elvedin Fiso

25 March 2023	Loimaan Palloseura (6)	0–6	VG-62 (4)	Naantali
		Report	Mikkonen 5', 83'; Ojala 42'; Soppi 49', 51', 54'	Stadium: Karvetti; Attendance: 40; Referee: Sarmad Lmati

25 March 2023	Turun Weikot (4)	1–1 (3–4 p)	Maskun Palloseura (4)	Turku
	Korbelainen 41'	Report	Forss 35'	Stadium: Kupittaa; Attendance: 20; Referee: Ari-Petteri Finnberg

=== Group 4 ===
19 February 2023	TPV/2 (6)	2–3	FC Haka j. (4)	Tampere
	Katiska 42'; Kälvi 88'	Report	Molin 30'; Listo 40'; Lindgren 69'	Stadium: Pirkkahalli; Attendance: 101; Referee: Kalle Mäkinen

5 March 2023	ACE/2 (7)	4–1	Janakkalan Pallo (7)	Tampere
	Aalto 45'; Hentilä 55', 88'; Tuovinen 75'	Report	Nousimaa 59'	Stadium: Kauppi; Attendance: 30; Referee: Olli Tamminen

10 March 2023	AC Darra (8)	0–8	Euran Pallo (5)	Tampere
		Report	Julin 12', 50'; Chungani 19'; Ruohola 28', 77'; Parviainen 45+1'; Härmälä 71'; Kumlander 79'	Stadium: Kauppi; Attendance: 20; Referee: Henrik Sandmark

11 March 2023	Nekalan Pallo (6)	0–8	Toejoen Veikot (5)	Tampere
		Report	Malmivuori 10', 89'; Joensuu 34', 35'; Mäkelä 41', 90'; Seppälä 79'; Kuusela 84'	Stadium: Kauppi; Attendance: 10; Referee: Juha Franssila

12 March 2023	Tampere United/3 (7)	2–2 (3–5 p)	NoPS 2 (5)	Tampere
	Koikkalainen 67'; Kytöviita 73'	Report	Sointu 19'; Sarvala 25'	Stadium: Pirkkahalli; Attendance: 39; Referee: Leo Oksanen

15 March 2023	P-Iirot 2 (5)	4–5	Musan Salama (4)	Rauma
	Tähkä 60'; Babb 69'; Mäntyharju 79'; Nurmi 90+2'; Tähtinen (red card) 90+4'	Report	Laitinen 18', 40', 74'; Simeon 38', 82'	Stadium: Äijänsuo stadion Referee: Niko Parviainen

18 March 2023	Ylöjärvi United FC (5)	1–0	Nokian Pyry (5)	Nokia
	Somppi 57'	Report		Stadium: Menkala; Referee: Juha Kivistö

18 March 2023	FC Ulvila (6)	2–1	Valkeakosken Koskenpojat (5)	Nakkila
	Pelkonen 16'; Virtanen 61'	Report	Rautanen 14'	Stadium: Liikuntakeskus; Referee: Ville Männistö

18 March 2023	FC Kangasala (6)	1–9	Tampereen Pallo-Veikot (4)	Tampere
	Thomassen 50'	Report	Lehti 1', 38', 73', 79'; Sebti 36', 40'; Merikoski 50'; Yli-Rajala 73'; Mbachu 73'	Stadium: Kauppi; Attendance: 40; Referee: Hannu Pajunen

18 March 2023	Karhu-Futis 2 (6)	1–4	Tampere United/2 (4)	Pori
	Kiekkinen 63'	Report	Unkuri 11'; Hietaniemi 14', 87'; Väliaho 90+2'	Stadium: Urheilukeskus; Attendance: 28; Referee: Jaakko Lakkamäki

19 March 2023	Oriveden Tuisku (6)	5–3	Lammin Veto (5)	Tampere
	Pitkäkoski 15'; Saramäki 57', 84'; Koskinen 64'; Tapiolinna 90+2'	Report	Tuominen 6'; Ojala 19', 60'	Stadium: Kauppi; Attendance: 12; Referee: Hannu Pajunen

19 March 2023	Viialan Peli-Veikot (7)	0–8	Pispalan Ponnistus-79 (5)	Tampere
		Report	Torppa 12'; Newman 27', 37'; Ivlev 29', 49', 72'; Sirkka 68'; Jäppinen 84'	Stadium: Kauppi; Attendance: 18; Referee: Hannu Pajunen

19 March 2023	FC Lasten (6)	6–2	Toijalan Pallo-49 (4)	Tampere
	Hanhiniemi 2'; Rahimi 9', 63'; Sehic 66'; Laouini 71'; Malwal 83'	Report	Laakso 12'; Lapinleimu 40'	Stadium: Kauppi; Attendance: 30; Referee: Eero Tuominen

19 March 2023	Lauttakylän Luja (6)	0–12	ACE (4)	Tampere
		Report	Knuuttila 3', 37', 43', 61'; Virtanen 7', 20', 83'; Jortikka 44', 81'; Kallio 49', 69'; Own goal 76'	Stadium: Kauppi; Referee: Ksenia Koulik

19 March 2023	Tampereen Palloilijat (5)	1–4	Sääksjärven Loiske (4)	Tampere
	Haataja 55'	Report	Baliçi 3', 62'; Soininen 21'; Tavares 90+1'	Stadium: Pirkkahalli; Referee: Henrik Sandmark

25 March 2023	FC Eurajoki (5)	2–5	Tampereen Peli-Pojat-70 (4)	Eurajoki
	Kähärä 56'; Patola 89'	Report	Belbachir 18', 20'; Klint 19'; Kuosmanen 23'; Baruffa 63'	Stadium: Tekonurmi; Attendance: 15; Referee: Miikka Lähdesmäki

25 March 2023	FC Harjavallan Pallo (6)	1–10	Nokian Palloseura (4)	Nakkila
	Lähdeviita 18'	Report	Valkama 20', 63'; Äijälä 24'; Peltola 27', 77'; Ala-Hakuni 31', 39', 45'; Nieminen 75', 83'	Stadium: Liikuntakeskus; Attendance: 31; Referee: Vasil Georgiev

25 March 2023	FC Eurajoki/II (7)	0–3	Lempäälän Kisa (5)
		Report

25 March 2023	Fish United (6)	10–0	Apassit (6)	Tampere
	Palohuhta 6', 74', 88'; Hakanpää 9'; Myllymäki 37'; Laouini 40', 53'; Anttonen 70'; Ljungman 80', 84'	Report		Stadium: Kauppi; Referee: Hannu Pajunen

25 March 2023	Ilves/4 (6)	4–1	Tervakosken Pato (4)	Tampere
	Jokinen 43', 65'; Vihinen 51'; Sarviharju 62'	Report	Tuominen 90+1'	Stadium: Kauppi; Referee: Juha Kivistö

=== Group 5 ===
4 March 2023	NJS/3 (6)	0–2	Tuusulan Palloseura (4)	Nurmijärvi
		Report	J Tiira 77'; M Tiira 90'	Stadium: Klaukkalan tekonurmi Attendance: 9 Referee: Roberto Miranda

4 March 2023	TuPS/M35 (+35)	0–3	Tolkis Bollklubb (6)	Tuusula
		Report	Augustsson 37', 45'; Vikström 54'	Stadium: Hyrylä Urheilukeskus; Referee: Jori Roimu

5 March 2023	HAlku/FC (7)	0–7	NuPS/2 (5)	Järvenpää
		Report	Vinkelberg 14', 34'; Lehikoinen 18'; Heinilä 29'; Akkanen 57'; Niinimäki 87'; Tuomisto 90'	Stadium: Monitoimihalli; Attendance: 48; Referee: Roberto Miranda

8 March 2023	Riihimäen Palloseura (4)	1–3	JäPS/47 (4)	Tammela
	Palomäki 83'	Report	Mikkola 18', 26'; Kyander 81'	Stadium: Eerikkilä-halli; Attendance: 100; Referee: Sami Katko

11 March 2023	Ares-86 (6)	1–6	Hyvinkään Palloseura (4)	Hyvinkää
	Mertanen 17'	Report	Saikkonen 2', 65'; Palomäki 38'; Helaste 56'; Leinonen 64'; Laakoli 88'	Stadium: Kankuri; Attendance: 80; Referee: Petri Mattila

11 March 2023	Kellokosken Alku (5)	0–6	Nummelan Palloseura (4)	Järvenpää
		Report	Own goal 19'; Långström 33'; Hakala 48', 87'; Helttunen 72', 90'	Stadium: Monitoimihalli; Attendance: 35; Referee: Adrijan Demirovic

12 March 2023	FC Kirkkonummi/3 (6)	3–8	Akilles (5)	Kirkkonummi
	Tortorelli 55', 75'; Tangan 69'	Report	Eriksson 13', 35', 38'; Own goal 41'; Britschgi 44', 51'; Tuominen 49'; Back 86'	Stadium: Urheilupuisto; Referee: Unto Virkkala

18 March 2023	IF Sibbo-Vargarna (6)	7–0	Halkian Alku (5)	Sipoo
	Peteri 3', 41'; Lepistö 12', 87'; Malinen 35', 44', 51'	Report		Stadium: Söderkulla tekonurmi Referee: Lucinilton Ferreira

18 March 2023	JäPS/U23 (5)	1–4	FC Kirkkonummi (4)	Järvenpää
	Kontio 51'	Report	Yermoshenko 13'; Lehtinen 28'; Silander 53'; Åberg 75'	Stadium: Monitoimihalli; Referee: Matti Blom

25 March 2023	JäPS/United (7)	0–3	Askolan Urheilijat (6)	Järvenpää
		Report	Venäläinen 20'; Kyyhkynen 64'; Hammar 90+1'	Stadium: Monitoimihalli; Attendance: 25; Referee: Erdal Karsandi

=== Group 6 ===
26 February 2023	FC LaPa (4)	0–6	Union Plaani (4)	Imatra
		Report	Kivistö 10', 66'; Kuokkanen 26', 49'; Jokinen 64'; Kouhia 90+1'	Stadium: Ukonniemi-areena; Attendance: 38; Referee: Remi Rantakaulio

5 March 2023	Karhulan Pojat (7)	0–2	LAUTP (5)	Kotka
		Report	Kareinen 27', 36'	Stadium: Arto Tolsa Areena; Attendance: 113; Referee: Erik Pakkala

5 March 2023	FC Villisiat (7)	0–7	FC Kuusysi (5)	Lahti
		Report	Shala 9', 70'; Kemppi 11'; Sukhotin 23'; Qasim Kathin 49', 81', 89'; Loodus (red card) 5'	Stadium: Mukkula Halli; Attendance: 69; Referee: Paul Kirsch

10 March 2023	Lappeenrannan Itäinen Raittiusyhdistys (5)	1–0	RPS Lions (5)	Lappeenranta
	Koshelev 48'; Kiwan (red card) 90+1'	Report		Stadium: Amis; Attendance: 28; Referee: Miika Pahkala

11 March 2023	FC LaPa/2 (5)	0–7	Peli-Karhut (4)	Lappeenranta
		Report	Pelmola 6'; Labbas 23'; Häkälä 37', 40'; Borg 70'; Takala 76'; Abdullah 90'	Stadium: Amis; Attendance: 10; Referee: Topias Kylliäinen

11 March 2023	Kotajärven Pallo (4)	1–3	Imatran Palloseura (4)	Imatra
	Karvinen 85'	Report	Reponen 10', 89'; Prior 90+4'	Stadium: Ukonniemi-areena; Attendance: 102; Referee: Matti Paakkinen

12 March 2023	Myllykosken Pallo-47 (4)	3–2	Haminan Pallo-Kissat (4)	Kotka
	Laiho 24'; Rämä 38'; Roponen 60'	Report	Kolsi 45+1'; Anttila 80'	Stadium: Arto Tolsa Areena; Attendance: 160; Referee: Turo Veini

12 March 2023	Kumu (5)	2–5	Kouvolan Jalkapallo (4)	Kotka
	Sormunen 50'; Puttonen 75'	Report	Saari 5'; Nakari 29', 56', 68'; Orijako 42'	Stadium: Arto Tolsa Areena; Attendance: 35; Referee: Samu Sievälä

12 March 2023	Jäntevä/Akatemia (6)	1–12	Kotkan Jäntevä (4)	Kotka
	Parkkinen 37'	Report	N Kansa 9', 16', 24', 39'; O Kansa 48', 74'; Tuominen 48'; Suikki 51'; Pasanen 82', 85', 85', 89'	Stadium: Urheiluhalli; Attendance: 224; Referee: Hiwa Haghi

15 March 2023	FC Loviisa (4)	1–2	Kultsu FC (4)	Kotka
	Lindholm 13'	Report	Puhakainen 40'; Kohonen 80'	Stadium: Arto Tolsa Areena; Referee: Kari Vantola

19 March 2023	Popiniemen Ponnistus (7)	11–0	Nastolan Nopsa (6)	Kotka
	Laitinen 5'; Nykänen 7', 47', 86', 88'; Lauretsalo 17'; Rikberg 25', 37'; Hänninen 29'; Boman 38'; Kelkka 72'	Report		Stadium: Urheiluhalli; Referee: Hiwa Haghi

19 March 2023	Union Plaani/17 (6)	0–10	JaPS/M35 (+35)	Lahti
		Report	Iikkanen 2', 20'; Hirvonen 3', 18'; Shala 5'; Riikonen 32'; Hietanen 44'; Sassila 45'; Kinnunen 84'; Wright 87'	Stadium: Mukkula Halli; Referee: Petri Mattila

=== Group 7 ===
25 February 2023	Huima/Urho (5)	2–2 (2–4 p)	Niemisen Urheilijat (4)	Äänekoski
	Ranta-Nilkku 43'; Terho 45+6'	Report	Levy 58'; Makkonen 63'	Stadium: Ylipainehalli; Attendance: 100; Referee: Kalle Nummela

25 February 2023	FC Soho (6)	1–6	Rangers (5)	Äänekoski
	Own goal 79'	Report	Kiiveri 24'; Kauppinen 30', 60'; Abahassine 32'; Abdul Salim 64'; Laaksonen 88'	Stadium: Ylipainehalli; Attendance: 20; Referee: Rurik Osola

12 March 2023	Konneveden Urheilijat (7)	4–3	Outokummun Pallo-84 (6)	Äänekoski
	Kääriäinen 8', 54', 75'; Viitala 81'	Report	Hakala 7'; Räsänen 27'; Forsman 56'	Stadium: Ylipainehalli; Attendance: 40; Referee: Panu Laivonen

16 March 2023	Juniori STPS (6)	1–7	Savonlinnan Seudun Palloseura (4)	Savonlinna
	Huttunen 90+2'	Report	Smirnov 6'; Marttinen 8', 51'; Kuusikko 35'; Korhonen 39'; Roivainen 71'; Virta 89'	Stadium: Tanhuvaara Halli; Attendance: 20; Referee: Atte Korhonen

18 March 2023	Komeetat (4)	0–2	MP/SavU (4)	Jyväskylä
		Report	Nykänen 23'; Karjalainen 55'	Stadium: Vehkalampi; Attendance: 30; Referee: Henri Tiensuu

25 March 2023	AFC Keltik (4)	2–2 (0–3 p)	Keuruun Pallo (4)	Joensuu
	Seppälä 1'; Abdul-Rahman 5'	Report	Ilmarinen 26'; Vuoriniemi 84'	Stadium: Hope Areena; Attendance: 53; Referee: Jooa Itämäki

25 March 2023	Petäjäveden Petäjäiset (5)	0–5	Lehmon Pallo-77 (4)	Äänekoski
		Report	Kuusela 26'; Nevalainen 59', 74', 76'; Ogude 85'	Stadium: Ylipainehalli; Attendance: 30; Referee: Hassan Soltani

26 March 2023	Ylämyllyn Yllätys (5)	1–2	Mikkelin Pallo-Kissat (4)	Joensuu
	Martikainen 18'	Report	Suutari 21'; Korvenpää 66'	Stadium: Hope Areena; Attendance: 60; Referee: Vladislav Dirgin

=== Group 8 ===
12 March 2023	FC Tarzan (6)	3–1	Savon Pallo (5)	Kuopio
	Raatikainen 12'; Ryynänen 53'; Flink 68'	Report	Manninen 79'	Stadium: Lippumäki Ylipainehalli; Attendance: 79; Referee: Kalle Hirvonen

18 March 2023	Kuopion Jalkapallokerho (5)	0–5	Pallo-Kerho 37 (4)	Kuopio
		Report	Rissanen 25', 47', 57'; Lyyra 65', 80'	Stadium: Väre areena Attendance: 20; Referee: Ville Nevalainen

25 March 2023	Toivalan Urheilijat (5)	1–2	Kajaanin Palloilijat (5)	Siilinjärvi
	Tauriainen 50'	Report	Trindade De Moura 38', 78'	Stadium: Tanhula; Referee: Jorik Hoxha

=== Group 9 ===
24 February 2023	Kokkolan Palloseura (6)	1–4	Alavuden Peli-Veikot (6)	Kokkola
	Kangasvieri 17'; Wikman (red card) 87'	Report	Own goal 8'; Yli-Kesäniemi 22'; Toivonen 41', 43'; Mäkynen (red card) 84'	Stadium: Kipparihalli; Attendance: 38; Referee: Mika Heikkilä

26 February 2023	Jalas (7)	2–4	FC KoMu (6)	Kuortane
	Ventelä 33'; Kukila 87'	Report	Jääskä 6', 49', 66'; Syrjämäki 58'	Stadium: Kuortaneen Palloiluhalli; Referee: Arttu Rahko

4 March 2023	Hyllykallion Myrsky (7)	0–13	FC Kiisto (4)	Seinäjoki
	Tolkki (red card) 75'; Ahomäki (red card) 82'	Report	Ekman 13', 56'; Nisula 18', 38', 39', 76', 83', 89'; Katajamäki 21'; Wingren 41'; Kainulainen 50', 84', 90+1'	Stadium: WallSport-areena; Attendance: 20; Referee: Topi Luoma

12 March 2023	Lohtajan Veikot (5)	1–3	Sporting Kristina (4)	Kokkola
	Kyösti 90+1'	Report	Grannas 78'; Mujkic 86'; Hietikko 90+2'	Stadium: Kipparihalli; Attendance: 56; Referee: Toni Martelin

14 March 2023	SJK-j Apollo (7)	3–0	Sääripotku (5)	Seinäjoki
	Lautamaja 11'; Nikupeteri 18'; Virtanen 90+2'	Report		Stadium: Wallsport areena Attendance: 127; Referee: Antti Viita

18 March 2023	Seinäjoen Sisu (6)	6–1	Ilmajoen Kisailijat (5)	Seinäjoki
	Takamo 13'; Ruokamo 28', 45+1'; Wachira 50'; Vuorela 56'; Uutela 64'	Report	Metsä-Ketelä 69'	Stadium: WallSport-Areena; Referee: Mustafa Kaya

20 March 2023	Lapuan Ponnistus-90 (6)	1–2	Akademisk Boll Club (5)	Lapua
	Tietäväinen 58'	Report	Virtanen 15'; Söderman 70'	Stadium: Patruuna-Areena; Attendance: 52; Referee: Arttu Rahko

21 March 2023	Bollklubben-48 (6)	1–4	SJK-j (5)	Vaasa
	Grines 88'	Report	Nyrhinen 13'; Husseini 41', 80'; Kangaskokko 44'	Stadium: Fennia-Areena; Attendance: 58; Referee: Vahidin Bajic

=== Group 10 ===
26 February 2023	FC Santa Claus-juniorit (5)	2–4	Haukiputaan Pallo (4)	Rovaniemi
	Salmela 50', 53'; Tuononen (red card) 88'	Report	Karvonen 19'; Pernu 26'; Kuisma 43'; Luolavirta 59'	Stadium: Ounashalli; Attendance: 120; Referee: Jarno Kiistala

11 March 2023	Puleward City (5)	1–3	Kellon Työväen Urheilijat (5)	Oulu
	Koskela 47'; Kesti (red card) 44'	Report	Lauri 17'; Leskelä 44'; Varjus 88'	Stadium: Heinäpää; Referee: Eemil Hietakangas

17 March 2023	Ajax (5)	0–5	Ponkilan Pantterit (4)	Kempele
	Kuusela (red card) 74'	Report	Kuivila 22', 28', 38'; Oravisjärvi 46'; Lyttinen 66'	Stadium: Ojan Rauta Areena; Attendance: 62; Referee: Satu Miettunen

19 March 2023	Tervarit-j (4)	7–0	ROI UTD (4)	Oulu
	Haanpää 2', 49', 54', 66'; Rauma 5'; Myllys 45'; Sainila 70'	Report		Stadium: Heinäpää; Attendance: 94; Referee: Joakim Väärälä

19 March 2023	Oulun Jalkapalloklubi (6)	1–3	Villan Pojat (5)	Oulu
	Ruottinen 25'	Report	Mattila 54'; Bouhia 63'; Heliste 70'	Stadium: Heinäpää; Attendance: 42; Referee: Timi Kärki

25 March 2023	Keminmaan Pallo (6)	12–0	FC Ylivieska/2 (6)	Oulu
	Lehto 2', 36', 41'; Tammenvirta 10', 44', 56', 59'; Starck 22', 62'; Harju 25', 86'; Pussinen 51'	Report		Stadium: Garam Masala Areena; Attendance: 50; Referee: Eemil Hietakangas

Kolarin Kontio (6)	w/o	Kemin Palloseura (4)
	Report

== Round 2 ==
Number of teams per tier still in competition
Veikkausliiga (1)	Ykkönen (2)	Kakkonen (3)	Kolmonen (4)	Nelonen (5)	Vitonen (6)	Kutonen (7)	Seiska (8)	M35 (+35)	Total
12 / 12	12 / 12	28 / 28	55 / 73	36 / 73	23 / 82	7 / 39	0 / 7	3 / 7	176 / 333

=== Group 1 ===
24 March 2023	ToTe/Keparoi (7)	0–1	Koivukylän Palloseura (4)	Helsinki
20:00 EEST	Ruuskanen (red card) 90'	Report	Nariman 24'	Stadium: Sahara; Attendance: 380; Referee: Larbi Boughdiri

30 March 2023	Polin Pallo (7)	3–1	SAPA/2 (6)	Espoo
20:00 EEST	Paukku 72', 81'; Lahikainen 84'	Report	Own goal 87'	Stadium: Keski-Espoo; Attendance: 12; Referee: Gezim Arifi

31 March 2023	Laaksolahden Jalkapalloseura (4)	0–7	Helsingin Palloseura (4)	Espoo
		Report	Koskelainen 4'; Laaksonen 57'; Kaivola 62', 72'; Granath 66'; Kenvin 83', 89'	Stadium: Laaksolahti; Attendance: 30; Referee: Gezim Arifi

31 March 2023	Esbo Bollklubb (4)	1–2	Töölön Taisto (4)	Espoo
	Hietanen 84'	Report	Stude 17'; Lassila 31'	Stadium: Keski-Espoo; Referee: Miika Pesonen

31 March 2023	Puistolan Urheilijat (4)	2–0	Malmin Palloseura (4)	Helsinki
	Honkaniemi 45'; Biga 60'	Report		Stadium: Töölön Pallokenttä; Attendance: 50; Referee: Juhani Karstila

31 March 2023	SAPA/Savanna (6)	2–7	HooGee (5)	Helsinki
	Abdi 34'; Luomaniemi 46'	Report	Hollfast 18', 55'; Waris 28'; Tihinen 38', 64'; Björkskog 41', 49'	Stadium: Töölön Pallokenttä; Attendance: 30; Referee: Lucinilton Ferreira

1 April 2023	Chicken Wings (5)	0–5	Toukolan Teräs (4)	Helsinki
		Report	Rantala 35', 45'; Nurminen 53', 75'; Mohammed 80'	Stadium: Töölön Pallokenttä; Attendance: 50; Referee: Mohamed Abdelgayed

2 April 2023	Tavastia (6)	1–5	Etelä-Espoon Pallo (4)	Helsinki
	Schelling 80'; Malolo (red card) 90+2'	Report	Baslakov 8', 13'; Aalto 29'; Roivainen 37'; Batalha 52'	Stadium: Tapanila; Attendance: 25; Referee: Larbi Boughdiri

2 April 2023	Pakkalan Palloseura (5)	1–1 (4–5 p)	Itä-Hakkilan Kilpa (5)	Vantaa
	Chauhan 80'	Report	Sirviö 83'	Stadium: Myyrmäen Jalkapallostadion; Attendance: 25; Referee: Niklas Heikkonen

2 April 2023	Töölön Vesa (5)	1–0	GrIFK/23 (4)	Kauniainen
	Ahonen 81'	Report	Sormunen (red card) 31'	Stadium: FA Solutions; Referee: Janne Juote

2 April 2023	PPJ/Lauttasaari (5)	0–1	Gnistan/Ogeli (4)	Helsinki
		Report	Wartiovaara 80'	Stadium: Töölön Pallokenttä; Referee: Esa Kallio

2 April 2023	FC POHU (5)	0–5	Vantaan Jalkapalloseura (4)	Helsinki
		Report	Nyholm 16'; Jmaali 21'; Merinen 26'; Auramo 50'; Hyvärinen 53'	Stadium: Talin Halli; Attendance: 100; Referee: Adrijan Demirovic

2 April 2023	Helsingin Ponnistus (5)	1–8	VJS/2 (5)	Vantaa
	Memonen 49'	Report	Souris 10', 23', 48', 66'; Mustonen 21'; Khan 33'; Varis 75'; Mertala 85'	Stadium: Aktia-Areena; Referee: Pekka Kemppinen

4 April 2023	Leppävaaran Pallo (5)	1–2	Malmin Ponnistajat (4)	Espoo
	Ihalainen 88'	Report	Pujals 6'; Itkonen 61'; Tikka (red card) 86'	Stadium: Leppävaaran tekonurmi Referee: Mohamed Abdelgayed

4 April 2023	Sexypöxyt/M35 (+35)	1–3	PPS/Old Stars (5)	Espoo
	Lagerblom 57'	Report	Tan 36'; Virtanen 85'; Vainio 90+3'	Stadium: Laaksolahti halli Attendance: 30; Referee: Joonas Kovapohja

5 April 2023	ToTe/Taiskin Tykit (6)	2–2 (3–1 p)	Espoon Tikka (5)	Espoo
	Own goal 90+1'; Wiren 90+5'	Report	Salgado Ismodes 43', 68'	Stadium: Espoonlahti; Referee: Joonatan Palviainen

9 April 2023	FC Dons (6)	3–2	Helsingin Ponnistus/2 (6)	Helsinki
	Wester 21'; Biskop 55'; Reuter 68'	Report	Osman 2', 90+1'	Stadium: Puotila; Referee: Oskari Tuomi

11 April 2023	SUMU/sob (5)	1–5	MPS/Atletico Malmi (4)	Helsinki
	Vural 30' (red card) 70'	Report	Hänninen 6', 18'; Nurmi 65', 80'; Maaranen 75'	Stadium: Kartano; Attendance: 30; Referee: Erdal Karsandi

11 April 2023	FC Hieho (5)	2–8	Laajasalon Palloseura (4)	Helsinki
	Viherä 27'; Holmberg 31'	Report	Rihtniemi 1', 57', 87'; Hänninen 20'; Simonen 22'; Räisänen 40'; Chit 45'; Soini 77'	Stadium: Töölön Pallokenttä; Attendance: 20; Referee: Larbi Boughdiri

11 April 2023	Kauklahden Pyrintö (6)	1–3	PPJ/Ruoholahti (4)	Espoo
	Own goal 21'	Report	Vartiainen 57'; Fagerström 58'; Vuonio 66'	Stadium: Hansavalkama; Referee: Gezim Arifi

=== Group 2 ===
30 March 2023	TuRaKe (5)	2–0	Piikkiön Palloseura (5)	Turku
18:00 EEST	Harjuhahto 49'; E. Tammi 73'	Report	Leppänen (red card) 50'; J. Karihtala (red card) 73'	Stadium: Kupittaa; Attendance: 30; Referee: Vili Lehtovaara

30 March 2023	MaPS 2 (6)	0–11	FC Inter 2 (4)	Naantali
20:15 EEST		Report	Vainionpää 11'; Voca 20', 25', 45', 75', 88'; Enbuska 68', 78'; Viitanen 70', 85'; Serdarevic 80'	Stadium: Karvetti; Attendance: 0 Referee: Muamer Coloman

1 April 2023	VG-62 (4)	3–2	FC Åland (4)	Naantali
	Mikkonen 36'; Soppi 39', 54'	Report	Sundman 13', 62'	Stadium: Karvetti; Referee: Samuli Stenman

4 April 2023	TPS/M35 (+35)	1–1 (9–8 p)	Maskun Palloseura (4)	Turku
	Hakala 62'	Report	Hujala 45'	Stadium: Kupittaa; Attendance: 100; Referee: Ari-Petteri Finnberg

5 April 2023	Bollklubben-46 (5)	1–4	EIF/2 (5)	Karis
	Josefsson 7'	Report	Artzen 4'; Ahamdi 66'; Lindholm 69', 89'	Stadium: Karjaan tekonurmi Attendance: 30; Referee: Janne Ylijääskö

5 April 2023	TPK 2 (6)	0–9	Kaarinan Pojat (4)	Turku
		Report	Kannisto 6'; Humalamäki 28'; Petterson 52', 54', 65'; Salminen 55', 61'; Lammassaari 67'; Ruuskanen 83'	Stadium: Kupittaa; Referee: Elvedin Fiso

6 April 2023	Littoisten Työväen Urheilijat (6)	1–3	Åbo IFK (4)	Littoinen
	Tuomi 82'	Report	Siirtola 39'; Honkasalo 71'; Laine 74'	Stadium: Littoisten tekonurmi Attendance: 150; Referee: Tomi Keipi

6 April 2023	Turun Nappulaliiga (7)	1–3	Åbo Club de Futbol (5)	Turku
		Report		Stadium: Kupittaa; Referee: Vili Lehtovaara

=== Group 3 ===
26 March 2023	ACE/2 (7)	2–3	FC Lasten (6)	Tampere
20:00 EEST	Knuuti 3'; Aalto 87'	Report	Al-Khafaji 17'; Abruquah 75'; Laouini 82'	Stadium: Kauppi; Attendance: 0 Referee: Eero Tuominen

1 April 2023	Fish United (6)	2–1	FC Ulvila (6)	Tampere
	Heinola 56'; Malinen 60'; Tamargo Martin (red card) 90+5'	Report	Bello 20'; Lastumo (red card) 90+5'	Stadium: Kauppi; Referee: Janne Laukkala

1 April 2023	Oriveden Tuisku (6)	2–9	Euran Pallo (5)	Tampere
	Koskinen 21', 25'	Report	Ruohola 23'; Julin 36', 38', 62', 65', 72'; Nuija 65'; Valli 78'; Chungani 81'	Stadium: Kauppi; Attendance: 18; Referee: Juha Kivistö

6 April 2023	Ilves/4 (6)	0–3	Toejoen Veikot (5)	Tampere
		Report	Joensuu 73', 89', 90+2'	Stadium: Kauppi; Attendance: 20; Referee: Ville Männikkö

6 April 2023	Sääksjärven Loiske (4)	1–3	Tampereen Peli-Pojat-70 (4)	Tampere
	Baliçi 67'	Report	Klint 27', 50'; Kajander 73'	Stadium: Kauppi; Attendance: 10; Referee: Hannu Pajunen

6 April 2023	Pispalan Ponnistus-79 (5)	0–10	FC Haka j. (4)	Tampere
		Report	Ryttyläinen 15'; Molin 34'; Varje 47'; Kittilä 51'; Törmä 60', 75', 82', 88'; Paasi 79'; Listo 86'	Stadium: Kauppi; Referee: Ville Erkkilä

8 April 2023	Lempäälän Kisa (5)	0–12	Musan Salama (4)	Tampere
		Report	Välilä 12', 59', 78'; Rantala 24', 42', 89'; Mohammadi 26', 86'; Adewoyin 30'; Simeon 45'; Nieminen 81'; Niinisalo 90+1'	Stadium: Vuores; Referee: Henrik Sandmark

10 April 2023	Ylöjärvi United FC (5)	3–2	Tampere United/2 (4)	Nokia
	Ylihärsilä 10', 80'; Neronen 13'	Report	Hietaniemi 34'; Korpinen 64'	Stadium: Menkala; Referee: Ville Kokkinen

10 April 2023	Nokian Palloseura (4)	2–1	Tampereen Pallo-Veikot (4)	Nokia
	Korvanen 22'; Peltola 31'	Report	Lehti 76'	Stadium: Menkala; Attendance: 186; Referee: Aleksi Keronen

10 April 2023	NoPS 2 (5)	0–9	ACE (4)	Nokia
		Report	Virtanen 11'; Laitinen 18'; Peltonen 31'; Kallio 41', 76', 88'; Hämäläinen 49'; Tast 60'; Jortikka 85'	Stadium: Menkala; Referee: Hannu Pajunen

=== Group 4 ===
22 March 2023	HyPS (4)	3–4	Tuusulan Palloseura (4)	Hyvinkää
19:30 EEST	Helaste 17'; Own goal 42'; Palomäki 69'	Report	Own goal 45+1'; Pitkänen 53'; Tiira 75', 88'	Stadium: Kankuri; Attendance: 103; Referee: Roberto Miranda

29 March 2023	NuPS/2 (5)	1–1 (3–4 p)	FC Kirkkonummi (4)	Nummela
20:00 EEST		Report		Stadium: Certos Areena

3 April 2023	Askolan Urheilijat (6)	1–2	Tolkis Bollklubb (6)	Sipoo
	Tester 19'; Koskela (red card) 31'	Report	Vikström 3'; Roos 87'	Stadium: Söderkulla; Referee: Mick Grönroos

4 April 2023	Akilles (5)	0–0 (3–4 p)	JäPS/47 (4)	Porvoo
		Report		Stadium: Pallokenttä; Attendance: 40; Referee: Miika Forsblom

4 April 2023	IF Sibbo-Vargarna (6)	2–7	Nummelan Palloseura (4)	Sipoo
	Peteri 36'; Grönholm (red card) 37'	Report	Vuorela 7', 38', 65'; Hakala 25'; Sonko 70'; Helttunen 72'; Koski 77'	Stadium: Söderkulla; Referee: Timo Kettunen

=== Group 5 ===
25 March 2023	MyPa (4)	11–0	Kotkan Jäntevä (4)	Kotka
17:30 EEST	Own goal 26'; Rämä 37', 45+1'; Roponen 43', 66', 69', 71'> Hietala 46', 74', 77'; Kaiga 90+3'	Report		Stadium: Arto Tolsa Areena; Attendance: 144; Referee: Saku Metsämuuronen

26 March 2023	Imatran Palloseura (4)	5–0	Peli-Karhut (4)	Imatra
19:45 EEST	Heimonen 3'; Kurkisuo 13'; Reponen 17', 60'; Ikonen 90'	Report		Stadium: Ukonniemi-areena; Attendance: 99; Referee: Remi Rantakaulio

29 March 2023	Lappeenrannan Itäinen Raittiusyhdistys (5)	0–6	Kultsu FC (4)	Lappeenranta
18:30 EEST	Hytti (red card) 70'	Report	Puhakainen 15', 23', 41'; Abubakar 17'; Kohonen 72'; Ruokoniemi 87'	Stadium: Amis; Attendance: 50; Referee: Topias Kylliäinen

2 April 2023	JaPS/M35 (+35)	2–0	Union Plaani (4)	Lahti
	Hirvonen 25'; Skinnari 68'	Report	Jokinen (red card) 20'	Stadium: Mukkula-halli; Attendance: 132; Referee: Tero Juurinen

4 April 2023	LAUTP (5)	0–2	Kouvolan Jalkapallo (4)	Lappeenranta
		Report	Nurminen 82'; Partanen 87'	Stadium: Amis; Attendance: 30; Referee: Remi Rantakaulio

4 April 2023	Popinniemen Ponnistus (7)	2–4	FC Kuusysi (5)	Kotka
	Nykänen 24' (red card) 89'; Lahti 82'	Report	Sadik 33', 45+1'; Shala 78'; Eerola 85'	Stadium: Arto Tolsa Areena; Referee: Atte Henrikkson

=== Group 6 ===
26 March 2023	FC Tarzan (6)	0–9	Rangers (5)	Kuopio
17:30 EEST		Report	Kauppinen 15', 37', 70'; Kiiveri 36', 58'; Kolu 67'; Laaksonen 82', 89'; Koskinen 84'	Stadium: Väre-areena; Attendance: 55; Referee: Hannu Törnroos

1 April 2023	MP/SavU (4)	1–4	Savonlinnan Seudun Palloseura (4)	Mikkeli
	Kurvinen 11'	Report	Marttinen 47'; Virta 63'; Huittinen 65'; Smirnov 67'	Stadium: Mikkelin-jp-halli; Attendance: 20; Referee: Kimmo Aholainen

6 April 2023	Lehmon Pallo-77 (4)	2–0	Keuruun Pallo (4)	Joensuu
	Ogude 26', 32'	Report		Stadium: Hope Areena; Attendance: 40; Referee: Vladislav Dirgin

7 April 2023	Pallo-Kerho 37 (4)	3–2	Mikkelin Pallo-Kissat (4)	Siilinjärvi
	Lukkarinen 20'; Rissanen 64'; Own goal 88'	Report	Hyvönen 44', 57'; Dos Santos Oliveira (red card) 90+1'	Stadium: Tanhula; Attendance: 80; Referee: Kasper Halonen

10 April 2023	Konneveden Urheilijat (7)	0–10	Niemisen Urheilijat (4)	Äänekoski
		Report	Levy 10', 16', 42'; Helin 49', 67'; Naakka 65'; Sjöblom 78', 90', 90+1'; Laukkanen 81'	Stadium: Ylipainehalli; Attendance: 25; Referee: Juha Rantanen

=== Group 7 ===
31 March 2023	Alavuden Peli-Veikot (6)	1–2	Sporting Kristina (4)	Kuortane
	Toivonen 76'	Report	Ramic 17'; Constant 70'	Stadium: Ilkka-Areena; Attendance: 32; Referee: Arttu Rahko

2 April 2023	Seinäjoen Sisu (6)	5–1	FC KoMu (6)	Seinäjoki
	Vuorela 7'; Uutela 16'; Ruokamo 65'; Khuphe 87'; Kuivalainen 90'	Report	Jääskä 22'	Stadium: OmaSP Stadion; Attendance: 74; Referee: Joona Haapa-Aho

4 April 2023	SJK-j Apollo (7)	4–2	Akademisk Boll Club (5)	Seinäjoki
	Pajula 44'; Muurimäki 45'; Haanpää 47', 51'	Report	Söderman 65'; Björk 72'	Stadium: WallSport Areena; Attendance: 107; Referee: Joona Haapa-Aho

6 April 2023	SJK-j (5)	2–2 (4–3 p)	FC Kiisto (4)	Seinäjoki
	Nyrhinen 18'; Husseini 52'	Report	Ekman 26'; Vedenjuoksu 60'	Stadium: OmaSP Stadion; Attendance: 150; Referee: Antti Viita

=== Group 8 ===
3 April 2023	Kellon Työväen Urheilijat (5)	1–1 (4–5 p)	Ponkilan Pantterit (4)	Oulu
	Al-Khalifdy 25'	Report	Lammela 21'	Stadium: Heinäpää; Attendance: 50; Referee: Tatu Korkalainen

7 April 2023	Villan Pojat (5)	3–4	Haukiputaan Pallo (4)	Oulu
	Sormunen 12'; Mattila 61', 66'	Report	Ervasti 18'; Luolavirta 25'; Tuominen 49'; Vandell 77'	Stadium: Heinäpään halli Attendance: 102; Referee: Satu Miettunen

10 April 2023	Kajaanin Palloilijat (5)	0–2	Tervarit-j (4)	Kajaani
		Report	Immonen 41'; Kurvinen 84'	Stadium: Pallohalli; Attendance: 142; Referee: Akseli Ropponen

10 April 2023	Keminmaan Pallo (6)	0–3	Kemin Palloseura (4)	Kemi
		Report	Kreivi 21'; Juntura 70'; Paavilainen 75'	Stadium: Junko; Attendance: 110; Referee: Joakim Väärälä

== Round 3 ==
Number of teams per tier still in competition
Veikkausliiga (1)	Ykkönen (2)	Kakkonen (3)	Kolmonen (4)	Nelonen (5)	Vitonen (6)	Kutonen (7)	Seiska (8)	M35 (+35)	Total
12 / 12	12 / 12	28 / 28	38 / 73	14 / 73	6 / 82	2 / 39	0 / 7	2 / 7	114 / 333

=== Group 1 ===
25 April 2023	Koivukylän Palloseura (4)	1–4	IFK Mariehamn (1)	Havukoski, Vantaa
18:00	Nariman 77'	Report	Sallinen 37', 79'; Ngueukam 89'; Anini Junior 90+1'	Stadium: Havukosken tekonurmi Referee: Jonathan Mainz

25 April 2023	PPJ/Ruoholahti (4)	2–2 (4–2 p)	Toukolan Teräs (4)	Helsinki
20:00	Ravattinen 43'; Vartiainen 90+1'	Report	Paavola 24'; Rämö 75'	Stadium: Töölö Pallokenttä; Attendance: 50; Referee: Fazli Suka

25 April 2023	MPS/Atletico Malmi (4)	2–1	FC Kirkkonummi (4)	Tapanila, Helsinki
	Hasan (red card) 66' Nurmi 84'; Saltykov 90+4'	Report	Leino 16'	Stadium: Mosan Wembley; Attendance: 55; Referee: Valentin Smirnov

26 April 2023	Polin Pallo (7)	0–12	Atlantis FC (3)	Espoon keskus, Espoo
		Report	Severino 2', 30', 47'; Kakule 15', 39'; Bekhedda 37'; Ibekwe 44'; Souza De Almeida 50'; Shevchenko 71'; Lassoued 75'; Rudenko 81'; Achenchab 87'	Stadium: Keski-Espoo; Attendance: 25; Referee: Gezim Arifi

26 April 2023	JäPS/47 (4)	1–4	Käpylän Pallo (2)	Järvenpää
	Mikkonen 28'	Report	Kärsämä 24', 35'; Lokake 88'; Begliardi 90+1'	Stadium: Lukion tekonurmi Attendance: 147; Referee: Mikko Leino

26 April 2023	Laajasalon Palloseura (4)	1–3	Järvenpään Palloseura (2)	Laajasalo, Helsinki
	Rihtniemi 71'	Report	Heidari 33'; Khayat 43'; Kuosa 90+5'	Stadium: Saari Areena; Attendance: 240; Referee: Abdirahman Sugulle

26 April 2023	Pallokerho-35 (3)	2–2 (3–5 p)	Helsingfors IFK (2)	Pihlajamäki, Helsinki
	Vuohtoniemi 61'; Ingoli 85'	Report	Hyppönen 45+1'; Ulmanen 57'	Stadium: Algeco Areena; Attendance: 494; Referee: Juuso Vuorinen

26 April 2023	VJS/2 (5)	1–5	Gnistan (2)	Myyrmäki, Vantaa
	Souris 35' (red card) 90+2'	Report	Järvinen 2'; Liikonen 67'; Andberg 69'; Markkanen 74'; Weckström 77'	Stadium: Myyrmäen jalkapallostadion Attendance: 100; Referee: Mikko Särkiniemi

27 April 2023	Itä-Hakkilan Kilpa (5)	0–13	Pallo-Pojat Juniorit (3)	Itä-Hakkila, Vantaa
		Report	Haajanen 18', 24', 30'; Mustonen 25', 68'; Anyamele 32'; Kari 39'; Boudali 49', 70', 82'; Kahelin 62'; Määttä 79'; Kallio 90+1'	Stadium: Itä-Hakkilan tekonurmi Attendance: 80; Referee: Mikko Särkiniemi

27 April 2023	Töölön Taisto (4)	1–7	Espoon Palloseura (3)	Helsinki
	Tolvanen 45+1'	Report	Sjöstedt 38'; Kiiski 61', 85'; Ahmed-Nur 74', 83'; Ruusu 79', 87'	Stadium: Töölön Pallokenttä; Referee: Joona Manninen

28 April 2023	ToTe/Taiskin Tykit (6)	0–6	Helsingin Palloseura (4)	Helsinki
		Report	Kaivola 17', 53'; Koskelainen 19'; Ekroth 38', 50'; Laaksonen 87'	Stadium: Töölön Pallokenttä; Referee: Joni Taipale

28 April 2023	SexyPöxyt (3)	0–3	Grankulla IFK (3)	Laaksolahti, Espoo
		Report	Mazouz 56'; Langhoff 79'; Tiilikainen 85'	Stadium: Laaksolahti tekonurmi Referee: Emil Kohvakka

28 April 2023	FC Futura (3)	3–2	Nurmijärven Jalkapalloseura (3)	Porvoo
	Faal 31'; Sundström (red card) 55'; Stenstrand 58'; Maloku 89'	Report	Hussein 39'; Lehtojuuri 56'	Stadium: Borgå Bollplan; Attendance: 165; Referee: Fazli Suka

29 April 2023	Töölön Vesa (5)	0–5	Puistolan Urheilijat (4)	Latokartano, Helsinki
		Report	Lamppu 14'; Honkaniemi 49', 82'; Ruumensaari 57', 90+1'	Stadium: Latokartanon tekonurmi Attendance: 70; Referee: Adrijan Demirovic

30 April 2023	Gnistan/Ogeli (4)	2–4	FC Honka/Akatemia (3)	Oulunkylä, Helsinki
12:30	Petäjä 56'; Wartiovaara 58'	Report	Aittokoski 12'; Hyvönen 29'; Opoku 34'; Könönen 90+1'	Stadium: Oulunkylän tekonurmi Attendance: 70; Referee: Valentin Smirnov

3 May 2023	Vantaan Jalkapalloseura (4)	1–1 (4–3 p)	FC Kiffen (3)	Myyrmäki, Vantaa
	Koponen 36'	Report	Korhonen 90+3'	Stadium: Myyrmäen jalkapallostadion Attendance: 238; Referee: Osman Mohammadi

6 May 2023	FC Dons (6)	1–2	Tuusulan Palloseura (4)	Pitäjänmäki, Helsinki
	Thorhallsson 36'	Report	Kantelinen 14'; Tiira 65'	Stadium: Tali; Attendance: 50; Referee: Adrijan Demirovic

7 May 2023	Tolkis Bollklubb (6)	1–1 (2–4 p)	Malmin Ponnistajat (4)	Porvoo
15:00	Ervast 49'	Report	Koskinen 44'	Stadium: Borgå Bollplan; Referee: Mikko Mörö

7 May 2023	HooGee (5)	7–4	PPS/Old Stars (5)	Matinkylä, Espoo
	Langhoff 7', 20', 45+1'; Björkskog 14'; Johansson 27'; Tuomola 64'; Hollfast 80'	Report	Raci 3'; Leppihalme 46'; Laukkarinen 67'; Kaqamak 75'	Stadium: Matinkylä tekonurmi Attendance: 60; Referee: Gezim Arifi

7 May 2023	Nummelan Palloseura (4)	2–1	Etelä-Espoon Pallo (4)	Nummela, Vihti
	Own goal 70'; Vuorela 84'	Report	Aalto 88'	Stadium: Ojamart areena Attendance: 250; Referee: Adrijan Demirovic

=== Group 2 ===
25 April 2023	Åbo IFK (4)	0–4	Ekenäs Idrottsförening (2)	Turku
18:30		Report	Björklund 48'; Ojala 64', 70', 74'	Stadium: Yläkenttä; Attendance: 140; Referee: Jesse Salo

25 April 2023	Musan Salama (4)	1–1 (0–3 p)	Salon Palloilijat (2)	Pori
	Laitinen 50'	Report	Muzaci 87'	Stadium: Urheilukeskus; Attendance: 184; Referee: Lassi Siukkola

25 April 2023	ACE (4)	0–4	Hämeenlinnan Jalkapalloseura (3)	Tampere
	Lahtinen (red card) 49'	Report	Paussu 8'; Supperi (red card) 41'; Lindberg 46'; Balde 59'; Luoma 81'	Stadium: Kauppi; Attendance: 100; Referee: Kalle Mäkinen

26 April 2023	Turun Palloseura (2)	0–2	Ilves (1)	Turku
		Report	Haarala 22'; Ngor 52'	Stadium: Yläkenttä; Attendance: 295; Referee: Samuli Stenman

26 April 2023	TPS/M35 (+35)	0–5	Tampere United (3)	Turku
		Report	Stenroos 44'; Raittinen 49'; Heikkinen 69'; Bullock 83'; Kostiainen 88'	Stadium: Kupittaa; Referee: Vili Lehtovaara

27 April 2023	Toejoen Veikot (5)	1–2	Pallo-Iirot (3)	Pori
	Siren 21'	Report	Schultz (red card) 36'; Ahde 38'; Ketola 83'	Stadium: Urheilukeskus; Attendance: 117; Referee: Aleksi Mäkinen

27 April 2023	Euran Pallo (5)	1–2	Turun Raittius Kerho (5)	Säkylä
	Nurmi 52'	Report	Järvistö 61', 80'	Stadium: Porin Prikaatin kenttä Attendance: 81; Referee: Niko Parviainen

29 April 2023	Ylöjärvi United FC (5)	0–4	Kaarinan Pojat (4)	Ylöjärvi
14:00	Tuominen (red card) 68'	Report	Florea 22'; Petterson 59'; Wikström 64'; Miftari 84'	Stadium: Soppeenharju; Referee: Henrik Sandmark

29 April 2023	FC Jazz (3)	4–2	Ilves-Kissat (3)	Pori
	Firmino 19', 61', 80'; Pitkälä 75'	Report	Paukkeri 50'; Zanidpour 63'; Nganbe (red card) 83'	Stadium: Herralahti; Attendance: 218; Referee: Vili Lehtovaara

2 May 2023	FC Inter 2 (4)	3–0	Ilves/2 (3)	Turku
	Vyyryläinen 5'; Yasin 6'; Voca 25'	Report		Stadium: Turku Energia Areena; Attendance: 100; Referee: Vili Lehtovaara

3 May 2023	FC Lasten (6)	1–3	Pargas Idrottsförening (3)	Hervanta, Tampere
	Rahimi 26'; Severino (red card) 90+1'; Hanhiniemi (red card) 90+5'	Report	Muse 41'; Nevä 70'; Rrustemi 83'	Stadium: Ahvenisjärvi; Referee: Lauri Luomala

6 May 2023	Åbo Club de Futbol (5)	1–5	Nokian Palloseura (4)	Turku
	Matomäki 69'	Report	Äijälä 57'; Peltola 59'; Ala-Hakuni 63', 70'; Siljander 87'	Stadium: Kupittaa; Attendance: 20; Referee: Mikko Kiviluoma

7 May 2023	Fish United (6)	0–5	Sporting Kristina (4)	Tampere
	Myllymäki (red card) 74'	Report	Own goal 72'; Constant 75'; Crane 78'; Järvinen 85'; Ramic 90+2'	Stadium: Kauppi; Attendance: 35; Referee: Henrik Sandmark

7 May 2023	EIF/2 (5)	3–2	Tampereen Peli-Pojat-70 (4)	Ekenäs, Raseborg
	Estlander 17', 60', 90+3'	Report	Tiilikainen 31'; Ahonen 89'	Stadium: Keskuskenttä; Referee: Jan-Peter Aravirta

8 May 2023	VG-62 (4)	3–2	FC Haka j. (4)	Naantali
	Girs 75'; Immonen 86', 87'	Report	Laaksonen 9'; Kittilä 14'	Stadium: Karvetti; Referee: Vili Lehtovaara

=== Group 3 ===
25 April 2023	Lehmon Pallo-77 (4)	0–2	Kotkan Työväen Palloilijat (1)	Joensuu
		Report	Huttunen 53'; Ishii 74'	Stadium: Mehtimäki; Attendance: 215; Referee: Miikka Haapakoski

26 April 2023	JIPPO (3)	1–2	FC Lahti (1)	Joensuu
	Partanen 47'	Report	Könkkölä 18'; Andrade 83'	Stadium: Mehtimäki; Attendance: 727; Referee: Miika Pesonen

26 April 2023	Kultsu FC (4)	1–5	Mikkelin Palloilijat (2)	Joutseno
	Seppälä 53'	Report	Adeleke 13'; Leinonen 47'; Kerminen 63'; Sahimaa 77'; Karttunen 90+4'	Stadium: Ravirata; Referee: Miika Pahkala

26 April 2023	Imatran Palloseura (4)	0–2	Jyväskylän Jalkapalloklubi (2)	Imatra
		Report	Leivonen 23'; Osso 48'	Stadium: Ukonniemi-areena; Attendance: 82; Referee: Ayhan Dag

26 April 2023	Savonlinnan Seudun Palloseura (4)	0–6	PEPO (3)	Savonlinna
		Report	Francisco Torres 43', 48'; Mélé Temguia 62'; Seilonen 75'; Flowers 85'; Pesonen 90'	Stadium: Noblessa Areena; Attendance: 125; Referee: Vladislav Dirgin

27 April 2023	Kuopion Elo (3)	3–1	FC Vaajakoski (3)	Kuopio
	Heiskanen 16'; Lipponen 39'; Eskelinen 60'	Report	Suutari 24'	Stadium: Väre-areena; Attendance: 150; Referee: Ville Nevalainen

29 April 2023	Rangers (5)	3–1	Niemisen Urheilijat (4)	Jyväskylä
	Kauppinen 8', 45'; Laaksonen 28'	Report	Levy 84'	Stadium: Jyskä; Attendance: 30; Referee: Minka Vekkeli

1 May 2023	Pallo-Kerho 37 (4)	1–3	Reipas (3)	Iisalmi
	Kosonen 25'	Report	Haziri 21', 90+2'; Babiker 82'	Stadium: Kankaan liikuntapuisto Attendance: 146; Referee: Miikka Haapakoski

2 May 2023	FC Kuusysi (5)	0–1	Myllykosken Pallo -47 (4)	Lahti
		Report	Kähkönen 62'	Stadium: Kisapuisto; Attendance: 82; Referee: Anssi Juurinen

7 May 2023	JaPS/M35 (+35)	0–0 (5–4 p)	Kouvolan Jalkapallo (4)	Lahti
		Report		Stadium: Kisapuisto; Attendance: 118; Referee: Ilkka Mäkelä

=== Group 4 ===
26 April 2023	Tervarit (4)	0–2	Vaasan Palloseura (1)	Oulu
		Report	Pitkänen 14'; Morrissey 63'	Stadium: Heinäpään Palloiluhalli; Attendance: 143; Referee: Pietu Niinimäki

26 April 2023	SJK Akatemia (2)	1–5	Seinäjoen Jalkapallokerho (1)	Seinäjoki
	Mekki 57'	Report	Streng 20', 32'; Vainionpää 30'; Dunwoody 49' (red card) 88'; Turunen 88'	Stadium: OmaSP Stadion; Attendance: 952; Referee: Kalle Mäkinen

26 April 2023	FF Jaro (2)	1–2	Kokkolan Palloveikot (2)	Jakobstad
	Sandstedt 90+4'	Report	Haapiainen 21'; Vitor Gomes 60'	Stadium: Tellushallen; Attendance: 534; Referee: Mikko Juusola

26 April 2023	Haukiputaan Pallo (4)	0–2	Rovaniemen Palloseura (3)	Haukipudas
		Report	Niska 12'; Ruotsalainen 49'; Lemarie (red card) 90+2'	Stadium: Länsituuli; Attendance: 220; Referee: Satu Miettunen

28 April 2023	Oulun Luistinseura (3)	3–0	Hercules (3)	Oulu
	Tiainen 17'; Raittinen 26'; Merikanto 78'	Report		Stadium: Heinäpää tekonurmi Attendance: 178; Referee: Akseli Ropponen

29 April 2023	Oulun Työväen Palloilijat (3)	3–3 (5–4 p)	Gamlakarleby Bollklubb (3)	Oulu
	Own goal 1'; Simsek 58'; Meglinski 70'	Report	Felix Ferreira 21'; Jokihaara 37'; Lämsä 80'	Stadium: Heinäpää tekonurmi Attendance: 35; Referee: Tatu Korkalainen

29 April 2023	Seinäjoen Sisu (6)	0–2	Vasa IFK (3)	Seinäjoki
		Report	Hammar 28'; Kiuru 30'	Stadium: Jouppilanvuori; Referee: Joona Haapa-Aho

6 May 2023	SJK-j (5)	1–3	Kemin Palloseura (4)	Seinäjoki
	Kangaskokko 67'; Hietala (red card) 90'	Report	Abdulahi 44'; Peurasaari 66'; Paavilainen 90'	Stadium: OmaSP Stadion; Attendance: 322; Referee: Mustafa Kaya

7 May 2023	SJK-j Apollo (7)	7–1	Ponkilan Pantterit (4)	Seinäjoki
	Ojala 25', 50', 70'; Haanpää 33'; Muurimäki 61', 77'; Järvinen 84'	Report	Kuivila 31'; Cevirel (red card) 49'	Stadium: WallSport-Areena; Attendance: 169; Referee: Olli-Jussi Sariola

== Round 4 ==
Number of teams per tier still in competition
Veikkausliiga (1)	Ykkönen (2)	Kakkonen (3)	Kolmonen (4)	Nelonen (5)	Vitonen (6)	Kutonen (7)	Seiska (8)	M35 (+35)	Total
12 / 12	9 / 12	18 / 28	15 / 73	4 / 73	0 / 82	1 / 39	0 / 7	1 / 7	60 / 333

=== Group 1 ===
16 May 2023	Helsingin Palloseura (4)	0–6	Atlantis FC (3)	Paloheinä, Helsinki
		Report		Stadium: JYA Housing Areena

17 May 2023	Espoon Palloseura (3)	1–4	Helsingfors IFK (2)	Espoonlahti, Espoo
	Ahopelto 30'	Report	Saira 4'; Hyppönen 42', 77', 90+1'	Stadium: Espoonlahti 2 Attendance: 1,200; Referee: Joona Manninen

17 May 2023	Grankulla IFK (3)	2–2 (3–4 p)	IF Gnistan (2)	Kauniainen
	Pulkkinen 1'; Koyate 47'	Report	Woivalin 89'; Tolonen 90+2'	Stadium: Keskuskenttä; Attendance: 187; Referee: Juuso Vuorinen

17 May 2023	Pallo-Pojat Juniorit (3)	0–3	IFK Mariehamn (1)	Jätkäsaari, Helsinki
		Report	Sallinen 3'; Andersson 38'; Asiri 54'	Stadium: Jätkäsaari TN; Attendance: 411; Referee: Amir Hajizadeh

17 May 2023	Nummelan Palloseura (4)	1–1 (1–3 p)	Järvenpään Palloseura (2)	Nummela, Vihti
	Vuorela 60'	Report	Mokuma 28'	Stadium: Ojamart Areena; Attendance: 250; Referee: Jonathan Mainz

17 May 2023	HooGee (5)	2–0	Malmin Ponnistajat (4)	Matinkylä, Espoo
	Wassell 74'; Hollfast 89'	Report		Stadium: Matinkylä TN; Referee: Fazli Suka

17 May 2023	Tuusulan Palloseura (4)	0–7	Käpylän Pallo (2)	Hyrylä, Tuusula
		Report	Kekarainen 11', 39'; Simojoki 18'; Rekola 49', 68', 75'; Yokochi 82'	Stadium: Hyrylän Urheilukeskus; Attendance: 150; Referee: Antti Kolehmainen

19 May 2023	PPJ/Ruoholahti (4)	0–3	Vantaan Jalkapalloseura (4)	Jätkäsaari, Helsinki
	Vartiainen (red card) 83'	Report	Ahola 2'; Nyholm 25'; Jmaali 84'	Stadium: Jätkäsaari TN; Referee: Valentin Smirnov

20 May 2023	Puistolan Urheilijat (4)	0–1	FC Futura (3)	Tapulikaupunki, Helsinki
		Report	Desalegen Atewebrhan 60'	Stadium: Tapulin tekonurmi Attendance: 250; Referee: Jesse Aalto

21 May 2023	MPS/Atletico Malmi (4)	2–4	FC Honka/Akatemia (3)	Tapanila, Helsinki
	Ruotsalainen 16'; Saltykov 77'; Quilodran (red card) 90+2'	Report	Hyvönen 20'; Ulundu 32'; Könönen 69'; Tanninen 90+4'	Stadium: Mosan Wembley; Attendance: 160; Referee: Osman Mohammadi

=== Group 2 ===
16 May 2023	EIF/2 (5)	0–2	Salon Palloilijat (2)	Ekenäs, Raseborg
	Ekström (red card) 90+3'	Report	Pyyskänen 45'; Sorvali 66'	Stadium: Centrumplan; Referee: Emil Kohvakka

17 May 2023	Nokian Palloseura (4)	1–5	Ilves (1)	Nokia
	Ala-Hakuni 19'	Report	Pennanen 4', 63'; Bushara 13'; Larsson 81'; Jukkola 87'	Stadium: Keskuskenttä; Attendance: 432; Referee: Henrik Sandmark

17 May 2023	Tampere United (3)	0–3	FC Inter (1)	Tampere
		Report	Järvinen 31'; Mastokangas 66'; Kuittinen 84'	Stadium: Kauppi; Attendance: 497; Referee: Aapo Kyllönen

17 May 2023	Kaarinan Pojat (3)	1–4	Ekenäs Idrottsförening (2)	Kaarina
	Nurmi 45+1'	Report	Pietsalo 1', 20', 80'; Tabi Manga 48'	Stadium: R.V.Group Areena; Attendance: 126; Referee: Samuli Stenman

17 May 2023	FC Jazz (3)	4–1	Hämeenlinnan Jalkapalloseura (3)	Pori
	Firmino 38', 90+2'; Riihimäki 43'; Visavuori 46'	Report	Paakkanen 72'; Kajanto (red card) 90'	Stadium: Pori Stadium; Attendance: 231; Referee: Einari Sario

18 May 2023	FC Inter 2 (4)	1–0	Pargas Idrottsförening (3)	Turku
	Voca 54'	Report		Stadium: Turku Energia Areena; Attendance: 150; Referee: Einari Sario

19 May 2023	Sporting Kristina (4)	1–2	Pallo-Iirot (3)	Kristinestad
	Crane 25'; Sifet (red card) 90+1'; Ramic (red card) 90+5'	Report	Silvennoinen 9'; Whiting 33'	Stadium: Kristina Plan; Attendance: 209; Referee: Joona Haapa-Aho

21 May 2023	Turun Raittius Kerho (5)	1–0	VG-62 (4)	Turku
		Report		Stadium: Kupittaa

=== Group 3 ===
17 May 2023	Myllykosken Pallo −47 (4)	0–14	Kotkan Työväen Palloilijat (1)	Myllykoski, Kouvola
		Report	Huttunen 8', 62'; Ramagingaye 19'; Paavola 22'; Roiha 25', 40', 43'; Laaksonen 34'; Pecile 37', 83'; Own goal 49'; Pozo-Venta 54'; De Vries 59', 85'	Stadium: KSOY Stadion; Attendance: 1064; Referee: Turo Veini

17 May 2023	Mikkelin Palloilijat (2)	1–1 (2–4 p)	Jyväskylän Jalkapalloklubi (2)	Mikkeli
	Avdi 8'	Report	Rutanen 85'	Stadium: Mikkelin Urheilupuisto; Attendance: 511; Referee: Juho Nieminen

17 May 2023	Rangers (5)	0–1	FC Lahti (1)	Viitaniemi, Jyväskylä
		Report	Zeqiri 90'	Stadium: Viitaniemi; Attendance: 302; Referee: Ayhan Dag

18 May 2023	Kuopion Elo (3)	1–5	PEPO (3)	Kuopio
	Lipponen 71'	Report	Francisco Torres 9', 90+2'; Own goal 18'; Stupiski 21', 41'	Stadium: Väre-Areena; Attendance: 90; Referee: Matti Roth

21 May 2023	JaPS/M35 (+35)	0–5	Reipas (3)	Lahti
		Report	Babiker 26'; Haziri 76'; Jokela 79'; Ala-Kauhaluoma 90+3', 90+4'	Stadium: Lahden Kisapuisto; Attendance: 1,077; Referee: Paul Kirsch

=== Group 4 ===
16 May 2023	SJK-j Apollo (7)	0–11	Vaasan Palloseura (1)	Seinäjoki
		Report	Pikkarainen 19'; Kuek 25', 31'; Hytönen 27'; Nuorela 39'; Morrissey 43', 67'; Strandvall 47', 78'; Friberg 55'; Michael 79'	Stadium: Wallsport-Areena; Attendance: 199; Referee: Joona Haapa-Aho

17 May 2023	Seinäjoen Jalkapallokerho (1)	1–4	AC Oulu (1)	Seinäjoki
	Kaukua 65'	Report	Coffey 14'; Karjalainen 19'; Liimatta 53', 74'	Stadium: OmaSP Stadion; Attendance: 1370; Referee: Kalle Mäkinen

17 May 2023	Kemin Palloseura (4)	1–2	Kokkolan Palloveikot (2)	Kemi
	Own goal 66'	Report	Ylimäki (red card) 15'; Ihalainen 29'; Paananen 35'	Stadium: Junko; Referee: Joakim Väärälä

17 May 2023	Vasa IFK (3)	4–2	Rovaniemen Palloseura (3)	Vaasa
	Irumwa 4'; Eerola 7'; Kiuru 13'; Mäntymäki 49'	Report	Savolainen 35'; Varhi 87'	Stadium: Lemonsoft Stadion; Attendance: 105; Referee: Robin Kuloalo

17 May 2023	Oulun Luistinseura (3)	2–2 (4–5 p)	Oulun Työväen Palloilijat (3)	Oulu
	Tiainen 70'; Torniainen 90'	Report	Säily 57'; Ukkola 62'	Stadium: Heinäpää; Attendance: 53; Referee: Pietu Niinimäki

== Round 5 ==
Number of teams per tier still in competition
Veikkausliiga (1)	Ykkönen (2)	Kakkonen (3)	Kolmonen (4)	Nelonen (5)	Vitonen (6)	Kutonen (7)	Seiska (8)	M35 (+35)	Total
11 / 12	8 / 12	9 / 28	2 / 73	2 / 73	0 / 82	0 / 39	0 / 7	0 / 7	32 / 333

30 May 2023	FC Inter (1)	8–0	FC Inter 2 (4)	Turku
	Jakonen 10'; Mastokangas 37'; Sejdiu 48'; Stavitski 57'; Aaltonen 69', 82'; Rökman 70'; Lehtisalo 89'	Report	Vainionpää (red card) 59'	Stadium: Veritas Stadion; Attendance: 265; Referee: Jesse Salo

30 May 2023	Vaasan Palloseura (1)	3–1	Oulun Työväen Palloilijat (3)	Vaasa
	Morrissey 3'; Michael 72'; Hytönen 77'	Report	Säily 56'	Stadium: Lemonsoft Stadion; Attendance: 403; Referee: Mikko Juusola

30 May 2023	Helsingin Jalkapalloklubi (1)	1–1 (2–4 p)	FC Honka (1)	Helsinki
	Meriluoto 23'	Report	Kaufmann 60'	Stadium: Bolt Arena; Attendance: 3093; Referee: Ville Nevalainen

30 May 2023	FC Lahti (1)	0–1	Helsingfors IFK (2)	Lahti
		Report	Ulmanen 53'	Stadium: Lahti Stadium; Attendance: 1030; Referee: Kalle Mäkinen

31 May 2023	Turun Raittius Kerho (5)	0–7	IFK Mariehamn (1)	Turku
		Report	Alan Henrique 21'; Enqvist 26', 35'; Dé 49', 85'; Lundberg 75'; Sid 87'	Stadium: Yläkenttä; Attendance: 424; Referee: Vili Lehtovaara

31 May 2023	AC Oulu (1)	1–1 (5–3 p)	FC Haka (1)	Oulu
	Ricardo Duarte (red card); Suutari 85'	Report	Ndiaye 28'	Stadium: Raatti Stadium; Attendance: 866; Referee: Juuso Vuorinen

31 May 2023	Ilves (1)	3–1	Käpylän Pallo (2)	Tampere
	Larsson 76', 86'; Haarala 90+7'	Report	Tammivuori 59'	Stadium: Ratina Stadium; Attendance: 513; Referee: Samuli Stenman

31 May 2023	Jyväskylän Jalkapalloklubi (2)	0–2	Kuopion Palloseura (1)	Jyväskylä
		Report	Dahlström 48'; Tuominen 56'	Stadium: Harjun stadion Attendance: 1553; Referee: Lassi Siukkola

31 May 2023	Kotkan Työväen Palloilijat (1)	1–1 (4–1 p)	IF Gnistan (2)	Kotka
	Lindfors 70'	Report	Sarr 29'	Stadium: Arto Tolsa Areena; Attendance: 1117; Referee: Joona Manninen

31 May 2023	FC Jazz (3)	0–2	Vasa IFK (3)	Pori
		Report	Etoka 61'; Silvennoinen 89'	Stadium: Pori Stadium; Attendance: 375; Referee: Pouria Notash

31 May 2023	Järvenpään Palloseura (2)	0–0 (2–4 p)	Ekenäs Idrottsförening (2)	Järvenpää
		Report	Xatart (red card)	Stadium: Keskuskenttä; Attendance: 251; Referee: Joona Kontinen

31 May 2023	HooGee (5)	0–6	Salon Palloilijat (2)	Matinkylä, Espoo
		Report	Muzaci 6'; Sorvali 9', 37', 66'; Heinonen 23'; Koski 90'	Stadium: Matinkylä tekonurmi Attendance: 200; Referee: Valentin Smirnov

31 May 2023	Pallo-Iirot (3)	5–1	FC Futura (3)	Rauma
	Ahde 18', 58'; Jalkanen 48'; Ohvo 64'; Ketola 87'	Report	Eerola 64'; Formisano (red card) 88'	Stadium: Äijänsuon Stadion; Referee: Robin Kuloaro

31 May 2023	Lahden Reipas (3)	2–2 (4–5 p)	FC Honka/Akatemia (3)	Lahti
	Haziri 9', 19'	Report	Haruna 21'; Tanninen 87'	Stadium: Kisapuisto; Attendance: 55; Referee: Amir Hajizadeh

31 May 2023	Atlantis FC (3)	0–1	Kokkolan Palloveikot (2)	Pihlajamäki, Helsinki
		Report	Venancio Gomes 13'	Stadium: Algeco Areena; Attendance: 113; Referee: Matti Roth

1 June 2023	Vantaan Jalkapalloseura (4)	3–2	PEPO (3)	Myyrmäki, Vantaa
	Merinen 29'; Jmaali 60'; Lankinen 84'	Report	Enbuska 16'; Flowers 56'	Stadium: Myyrmäen jalkapallostadion Attendance: 317; Referee: Miika Pesonen

== Round 6 ==
Number of teams per tier still in competition
Veikkausliiga (1)	Ykkönen (2)	Kakkonen (3)	Kolmonen (4)	Nelonen (5)	Vitonen (6)	Kutonen (7)	Seiska (8)	M35 (+35)	Total
8 / 12	4 / 12	3 / 28	1 / 73	0 / 73	0 / 82	0 / 39	0 / 7	0 / 6	16 / 333

21 June 2023	FC Honka (1)	5–1	FC Honka/Akatemia (3)	Espoo
18:00	Baak 25'; Hernández 28'; Kaufmann 54'; Gonshaw 81'; Naamo 86'	Report	Koukkumäki 43'	Stadium: Tapiolan Urheilupuisto; Attendance: 531; Referee: Miika Pesonen

21 June 2023	SalPa (2)	0–0 (4–2 p)	FC Inter (1)	Salo
18:30	Grönlund (yellow card) 76'	Report	Jyry (yellow card) 27'	Stadium: Salon Urheilupuisto; Attendance: 686; Referee: Oliver Reitala
	Penalties
	Huhtala (penalty scored); Meura (penalty scored); Olsbo (penalty missed); Ahmadi (penalty scored); Heinonen (penalty scored)		(penalty missed) Almén; (penalty scored) Järvinen; (penalty scored) Sejdiu; (penalty scored) Jakonen; (penalty missed) Kuittinen

21 June 2023	KTP (1)	3–0	EIF (2)	Kotka
18:30	Roiha 30' 77' 83' (pen.); Rautiola (yellow card) 47'; Huttunen (yellow card) 78'; Pecile (yellow card) 86'; Lehtiranta (yellow card) 90'	Report	Esua (yellow card) 29' (yellow-red card) 81'; Leksell (yellow card) 81'; Kofi Adu (yellow card) 81'	Stadium: Arto Tolsa Areena; Attendance: 1,748; Referee: Mohammad Al-Emara

22 June 2023	KuPS (1)	1–0	HIFK (2)	Kuopio
17:00	Popovitch (yellow card) 38'; Bispo 80'	Report	Arajuuri (yellow card) 39'; Ahadi (yellow card) 45+4'; Tiquinho (yellow card) 78'; Puro (yellow card) 89'	Stadium: Väre Areena; Attendance: 1,274; Referee: Petri Viljanen

22 June 2023	AC Oulu (1)	0–0 (3–2 p)	VPS (1)	Oulu
18:00		Report	Mensah; Bashkirov (yellow card) 90+4'	Stadium: Raatti Stadium; Attendance: 1,364; Referee: Peiman Simani
	Penalties
	Breitenmoser (penalty scored); Breitenmoser (penalty scored); Coffey (penalty missed); Suutari (penalty scored); Daoussi (penalty missed)		(penalty missed) Strandvall; (penalty scored) Hudd; (penalty missed) Reid; (penalty scored) Pitkänen; (penalty missed) Morrissey

22 June 2023	Ilves (1)	4–1	KPV (2)	Tampere
18:00	Ala-Myllymäki 15'; Moussa (yellow card) 20'; Mäenpää 24' (yellow card) 41'; Haarala 72'; Parfitt-Williams 78' (pen.)	Report	Umar 31' (o.g.); Liukkonen (yellow card) 71'; Ahokangas (yellow card) 77'	Stadium: Ratina Stadium; Attendance: 611; Referee: Dennis Antamo

22 June 2023	VIFK (3)	0–1	Mariehamn (1)	Vassa
18:00	Kiuri (yellow card) 60'; M. Birhane (yellow card) 90+2'	Report	Andersson (yellow card) 32'; Dé (yellow card) 38'; Ngueukam 45'; Sumusalo (yellow card) 53'; Nissinen (yellow card) 62'	Stadium: Lemonsoft Stadium; Attendance: 588; Referee: Mikko Juusola

22 June 2023	VJS (4)	2–1	P-Iirot (3)	Vantaa
18:00	Nyholm 40'; Lankinen 66'; Merinen (yellow card) 86'	Report	Silvennoinen (yellow card) 56'; Whiting (yellow card) 63'; Vesala (yellow card) 71'; Salonen 78' (pen.)	Stadium: Myyrmäen jalkapallostadion Attendance: 1,578; Referee: Joona Kontinen

== Quarterfinals ==
Number of teams per tier still in competition
Veikkausliiga (1)	Ykkönen (2)	Kakkonen (3)	Kolmonen (4)	Nelonen (5)	Vitonen (6)	Kutonen (7)	Seiska (8)	M35 (+35)	Total
6 / 12	1 / 12	0 / 28	1 / 73	0 / 73	0 / 82	0 / 39	0 / 7	0 / 6	8 / 333

5 July 2023	Mariehamn (1)	1–1 (5–4 p)	KuPS (1)	Mariehamn
18:00	Hopcutt (yellow card) 37'; Ndom (yellow card) 53'; Dé 88'	Report	Bispo (yellow card) 22'; Oksanen 28'	Stadium: Wiklöf Holding Arena; Attendance: 1,069; Referee: Peiman Simani
	Penalties
	Dé (penalty scored); Ngueukam (penalty scored); Sid (penalty scored); Henriksson (penalty scored); Ngamba (penalty scored)		(penalty scored) Vidjeskog; (penalty scored) Heinonen; (penalty scored) Cissé; (penalty missed) Dahlström; (penalty scored) Antwi

5 July 2023	KTP (1)	1–2	Oulu (1)	Kotka
18:30	Manthatis 6'; Mäkelä (yellow card) 20'; Ramadingaye (yellow card) 48'	Report	Selander (yellow card) 26'; Jokelainen (yellow card) 28'; Pallas (yellow card) 69'; Coffey 75' (yellow card) 80'; Breitenmoser (yellow card) 77'; Miettinen (yellow card) 80'; Liimatta 83'	Stadium: Arto Tolsa Areena; Attendance: 2,241; Referee: Joni Hyytiä

5 July 2023	SalPa (2)	1–3	FC Honka (1)	Salo
18:30	Huhtala 45'; Meura (yellow card) 61'	Report	Österlund 27' (o.g.); Alegría 31', 90'	Stadium: Salon Urheilupuisto; Attendance: 1,132; Referee: Antti Munukka

5 July 2023	VJS (4)	0–4	Ilves (1)	Vantaa
19:00	Jurvanen (yellow card) 31'; Merinen (yellow card) 81'	Report	Miettunen 17'; Arifi (yellow card) 39'; N'Diaye (yellow card) 43'; Pennanen 46' (pen.); Parfitt-Williams (yellow card) 83'; James 86'; Larsson 89'	Stadium: Myyrmäen jalkapallostadion Attendance: 2,883; Referee: Kalle Mäkinen

== Semifinals ==
The draw for the two semifinal matches was held on 11 July 2023.

Number of teams per tier still in competition
Veikkausliiga (1)	Ykkönen (2)	Kakkonen (3)	Kolmonen (4)	Nelonen (5)	Vitonen (6)	Kutonen (7)	Seiska (8)	M35 (+35)	Total
4 / 12	0 / 12	0 / 28	0 / 73	0 / 73	0 / 82	0 / 39	0 / 7	0 / 6	4 / 333

23 August 2023	Honka (1)	1–0	Mariehamn (1)	Espoo
16:00	Eremenko 76' (pen.)			Stadium: Tapiolan Urheilupuisto

23 August 2023	Ilves (1)	1–0	Oulu (1)	Tampere
17:00	Miettunen 76'			Stadium: Ratina Stadium

== Final ==
The final was held on 30 September 2023.

Number of teams per tier still in competition
Veikkausliiga (1)	Ykkönen (2)	Kakkonen (3)	Kolmonen (4)	Nelonen (5)	Vitonen (6)	Kutonen (7)	Seiska (8)	M35 (+35)	Total
2 / 12	0 / 12	0 / 28	0 / 73	0 / 73	0 / 82	0 / 39	0 / 7	0 / 6	2 / 333

30 September 2023	Honka (1)	1–2	Ilves (1)	Helsinki
14:00	Laine 8'	Report	Miettunen 15'; Parfitt-Williams 27'	Stadium: Helsinki Olympic Stadium; Attendance: 4,431; Referee: Joni Hyytiä
