= Sallinen =

Sallinen is a Finnish surname. Notable people with the surname include:

- Tyko Sallinen (1879–1955), Finnish expressionist painter
- Aulis Sallinen (born 1935), Finnish contemporary classical music composer
- Raili Sallinen (born 1938), Finnish ski orienteering competitor
- Kari Sallinen (born 1959), Finnish orienteering competitor
- Tomi Sallinen (born 1989), Finnish professional ice hockey center
- Jere Sallinen (born 1990), Finnish professional ice hockey winger
- Oskari Sallinen (born 2001), Finnish professional football midfielder
- Hanna-Riikka Sallinen (born 1973), Finnish multi–sport high performance female athlete, played women's ice hockey, bandy, and rinkball
