= Lauri Laine =

Finnish footballer (born 2005)

Personal information
- Date of birth: 30 May 2005 (age 21)
- Height: 1.80 m (5 ft 11 in)
- Position: Winger

Team information
- Current team: Inter Turku (on loan from Baník Ostrava)
- Number: 28

Youth career
- 2010–2021: Honka

Senior career*
Years	Team	Apps	(Gls)
2021–2023	Honka II	26	(2)
2022–2023	Honka	30	(0)
2024–2025	SJK	38	(1)
2024–2025	SJK II	7	(2)
2026–	Baník Ostrava	0	(0)
2026	Baník Ostrava B	10	(0)
2026–	→ Inter Turku (loan)	10	(1)

International career^{‡}
2019	Finland U15	2	(0)
2021–2022	Finland U17	9	(1)
2022–2023	Finland U18	6	(2)
2023	Finland U19	5	(0)
Medal record
Honka
First place	Finnish League Cup	2022
Second place	Finnish Cup	2023
- * Club domestic league appearances and goals as of 12 November 2026 ‡ National team caps and goals as of 17 October 2023

Lauri Laine (born 30 May 2005) is a Finnish professional footballer who plays as a winger for Inter Turku on loan from Czech First League club Baník Ostrava.

== Club career ==
=== Honka ===
Laine started playing football in the youth sector of Honka in Espoo, when he was five years old. He made his debut with the Honka first team on 14 March 2022, in a pre-season Finnish League Cup match against SJK. He made his Veikkausliiga debut on 29 April 2022 at the age of 16, in a 0–2 away victory against Lahti, coming in from the bench on the 77th minute, as a substitute for Edmund Arko-Mensah.

On 6 September 2023, Laine extended his contract with Honka, signing "a new long-term deal", according to the club. Laine scored his first goal for Honka on 30 September 2023, in the 2023 Finnish Cup final against Ilves. Despite his goal, Honka fell short and lost the final 1–2.

At the end of the 2023 season, Honka was suddenly declared bankrupt, and Laine was released after playing a total of 13 years for the club.

=== SJK Seinäjoki ===
On 28 November 2023, it was announced that fellow Veikkausliiga side SJK had signed with Laine on a two-year deal.

=== FC Baník Ostrava ===
On 3 January 2026, Laine signed a three-and-a-half-year contract with FC Baník Ostrava.

== International career ==
Laine is a regular youth international and has represented Finland at various youth national team levels.

In 2023, he was part of the Finland U19 squad in the 2024 UEFA European Under-19 Championship qualification tournament, in three games against Romania, Czech Republic and San Marino.

== Career statistics ==
As of 3 January 2026

Appearances and goals by club, season and competition
Club	Season	League			National cup (Note: Includes Suomen Cup)		League cup (Note: Appearance(s) in Finnish League Cup)		Continental		Total	
Club	Season	Division	Apps	Goals	Apps	Goals	Apps	Goals	Apps	Goals	Apps	Goals
Honka Akatemia	2021	Kakkonen	7	0	0	0	—		—		7	0
Honka Akatemia	2022	Kakkonen	18	2	0	0	—		—		18	2
Honka Akatemia	2023	Kakkonen	1	0	0	0	—		—		1	0
Honka Akatemia	Total		26	2	0	0	0	0	0	0	26	2
Honka	2022	Veikkausliiga	1	0	0	0	1	0	—		2	0
Honka	2023	Veikkausliiga	29	0	4	1	5	0	1 (Note: Appearance(s) in UEFA Europa Conference League)	0	39	1
Honka	Total		30	0	4	1	6	0	1	0	41	1
SJK	2024	Veikkausliiga	13	0	4	1	0	0	—		17	1
SJK	2025	Veikkausliiga	25	1	1	0	5	0	1	0	32	1
SJK	Total		38	1	5	1	5	0	1	0	49	2
SJK Akatemia	2024	Ykkösliiga	4	0	—		—		—		4	0
SJK Akatemia	2025	Ykkösliiga	3	2	—		—		—		4	0
SJK Akatemia	Total		7	2	0	0	0	0	0	0	7	2
Baník Ostrava	2025–26	Czech First League	0	0	0	0	—		—		0	0
Career total			101	5	9	2	11	0	2	0	123	7

== Honours ==
FC Honka

- Finnish League Cup: 2022
- Finnish Cup runner-up: 2023
