= Pekka Lagerblom =

Finnish footballer (born 1982)

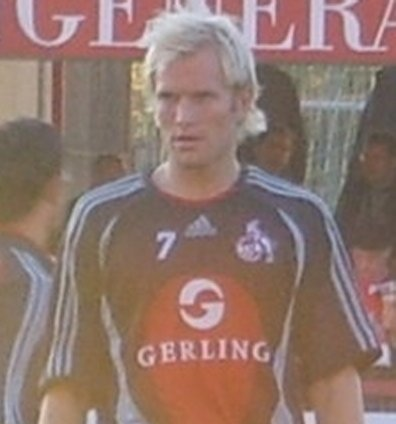
- Lagerblom with 1. FC Köln in 2006

Personal information
- Full name: Pekka Sakari Lagerblom
- Date of birth: 19 October 1982 (age 44)
- Place of birth: Lahti, Finland
- Height: 1.80 m (5 ft 11 in)
- Position: Midfielder

Senior career*
Years	Team	Apps	(Gls)
2003–2004	Lahti	55	(13)
2004–2006	Werder Bremen	14	(0)
2004–2006	Werder Bremen II	7	(0)
2005	→ 1. FC Nürnberg (loan)	11	(0)
2006–2007	1. FC Köln	27	(1)
2007–2009	Alemannia Aachen	40	(0)
2007	Alemannia Aachen II	1	(0)
2009–2010	FSV Frankfurt	13	(0)
2010–2011	VfB Stuttgart II	30	(0)
2011–2012	RB Leipzig	7	(1)
2013	IFK Mariehamn	21	(1)
2014	Hamarkameratene	8	(1)
2014	Ånge	1	(0)
2015	Lahti	20	(1)
2016	Jacksonville Armada	11	(0)
2017	Åtvidaberg	25	(2)
2018–2019	Haka	11	(0)
2019	Lahti	10	(0)
Total		312	(20)

International career
2003–2006	Finland	12	(0)
Medal record
Werder Bremen
Winner	Bundesliga	2004
Winner	DFB-Pokal	2004
Runner-up	Bundesliga	2006
- * Club domestic league appearances and goals

Pekka Sakari Lagerblom (born 19 October 1982) is a Finnish former professional footballer who played as a midfielder. Notably, he won the German double of Bundesliga and DFB-Pokal with Werder Bremen in 2004.

== Club career ==
=== FC Lahti ===
Born in Lahti, Lagerblom started his career at home-town club FC Lahti in Finland's Veikkausliiga. During seasons 2003 and 2004 he represented the team in 55 matches and scored 13 goals.

=== Germany ===
In January 2004, Lagerblom moved to Werder Bremen, and won the Bundesliga and German Cup double with the club the same spring. However, he made only 14 appearances in Bremen's first team and was not able to find a regular spot. He spent the spring of 2005 on loan at 1. FC Nürnberg.

In the summer of 2006, he decided to move to 1. FC Köln in search of more first team football. He gained 27 appearances in the team and scored one goal.

In summer 2007, he went to Alemannia Aachen. Between years 2007 and 2009 he represented the team in 40 matches.

In June 2009, Lagerblom left Aachen and signed a one-year contract with FSV Frankfurt. He played in 13 matches during the season.

In July 2010, Lagerblom moved to VfB Stuttgart II where he made 30 appearances in season 2010–11.

One year later he signed for RB Leipzig. He left the team after making only seven caps for the team.

=== Later years ===
On 20 February 2013, it was announced that Lagerblom would be joining Veikkausliiga team IFK Mariehamn.

On 21 December 2013, it was announced that Lagerblom would be joining Norwegian side Hamarkameratene signing a three-year contract. In July 2014, it was announced that he would leave the team.

In July 2014, it was announced that Lagerblom joined Swedish side division 4 club Ånge IF. He was injured in his debut versus Hudiksvalls FF.

In January 2015, FC Lahti announced the signing of Lagerblom for the 2015 Veikkausliiga season.

In July 2018, he joined Ykkönen side FC Haka.

In early 2019, he joined hometown club FC Lahti for the third time in his career.

In September 2019, Lagerblom announced his retirement as a player.

== International career ==
Lagerblom made his debut for the Finland national team on 16 November 2003 against Honduras. Lagerblom is not a regular member, he is often a substitute member of the Finland squad.

== Later career ==
After ending his professional playing career, Lagerblom has worked as a youth talent coach for FC Espoo and in the Southern District of Finnish FA. He is also studying sport journalism at the Haaga-Helia University of Applied Sciences in Helsinki, and works as a Veikkausliiga football studio expert in Ruutu+ broadcasts for Nelonen Media.

== Personal life ==
Lagerblom married Anna-Maria (née Lewe), the younger sister of German pop singer Sarah Connor, in January 2005. The couple separated in 2009, while she began a new relationship with footballer Mesut Özil.

His older brother Lasse is also a former footballer.

Lagerblom is currently married to personal trainer and rugby player Oona Tolppanen, with whom he has two children.

== Career statistics ==
=== Club ===
As of 19 June 2024

Appearances and goals by club, season and competition
Club	Season	League			National cup (Note: Includes Suomen Cup, DFB-Pokal, Norwegian Cup, Svenska Cupen)		Continental		Other		Total	
Club	Season	Division	Apps	Goals	Apps	Goals	Apps	Goals	Apps	Goals	Apps	Goals
Lahti	2001	Veikkausliiga	7	0	–		–		–		7	0
Lahti	2002	Veikkausliiga	24	6	1	0	–		–		25	6
Lahti	2003	Veikkausliiga	22	7	0	0	–		–		22	7
Lahti	Total		53	13	1	0	0	0	0	0	54	13
Werder Bremen	2003–04	Bundesliga	7	0	1	0	–		–		8	0
Werder Bremen	2004–05	Bundesliga	4	0	1	0	1 (Note: Includes UEFA Champions League)	0	2 (Note: Includes DFL-Ligapokal)	0	8	0
Werder Bremen	2005–06	Bundesliga	3	0	2	0	0	0	–		5	0
Werder Bremen	Total		14	0	4	0	1	0	2	0	21	0
Werder Bremen II	2004–05	Regionalliga Nord	1	0	–		–		–		1	0
Werder Bremen II	2005–06	Regionalliga Nord	6	0	–		–		–		6	0
Werder Bremen II	Total		7	0	0	0	0	0	0	0	7	0
1. FC Nürnberg (loan)	2004–05	Bundesliga	11	0	–		–		–		11	0
1. FC Köln	2006–07	2. Bundesliga	27	1	3	0	–		–		30	1
Alemannia Aachen	2007–08	2. Bundesliga	19	0	2	1	–		–		21	1
Alemannia Aachen	2008–09	2. Bundesliga	21	0	2	0	–		–		23	0
Alemannia Aachen	Total		40	0	4	1	0	0	0	0	44	1
Alemannia Aachen II	2007–08	Oberliga Nordrhein	1	0	–		–		–		1	0
FSV Frankfurt	2009–10	2. Bundesliga	13	0	0	0	–		–		13	0
FSV Frankfurt II	2009–10	Hessenliga	3	0	–		–		–		3	0
VfB Stuttgart II	2010–11	3. Liga	30	0	–		–		–		30	0
RB Leipzig	2011–12	Regionalliga Nord	7	1	1	0	–		–		8	1
RB Leipzig II	2011–12	Sachsenliga	1	0	–		–		–		1	0
IFK Mariehamn	2013	Veikkausliiga	21	1	3	0	2 (Note: Includes UEFA Europa League)	0	1 (Note: Includes Finnish League Cup)	0	27	1
HamKam	2014	1. divisjon	8	1	2	0	–		–		10	1
Ånge	2014	Division 2	1	0	–		–		–		1	0
Lahti	2015	Veikkausliiga	20	1	1	0	1	1	1	0	23	2
Jacksonville Armada	2016	NASL	11	0	–		–		–		11	0
Åtvidaberg	2017	Superettan	25	2	1	1	–		–		26	3
Haka	2018	Ykkönen	11	0	–		–		–		11	0
SexyPöxyt	2018	Kolmonen	4	0	–		–		–		4	0
Lahti	2019	Veikkausliiga	13	0	5	0	–		–		18	0
Career total			321	20	25	2	4	1	4	0	354	23

=== International ===
Appearances and goals by national team and year
National team	Year	Apps	Goals
Finland	2003	2	0
Finland	2004	2	0
Finland	2005	4	0
Finland	2006	4	0
Total		12	0

== Honours ==
Werder Bremen

- Bundesliga: 2003–04
- DFB-Pokal: 2003–04
- Bundesliga runner-up: 2005–06
