= Joona Järvistö =

Finnish footballer (born 1996)

Personal information
- Date of birth: 29 December 1996 (age 29)
- Place of birth: Lieto, Finland
- Height: 1.83 m (6 ft 0 in)
- Position: Forward

Team information
- Current team: Inter Turku

Youth career
- KaaPo

Senior career*
Years	Team	Apps	(Gls)
2015–2017	KaaPo		
2018–	Inter Turku	22	(2)
2019	→ KaaPo (loan)	10	(3)
- * Club domestic league appearances and goals as of 19:32, 22 December 2019 (UTC)

Joona Järvistö (born 29 December 1996) is a Finnish professional footballer who plays for FC Inter Turku, as a striker.

== Career ==
=== Inter Turku ===
Järvistö joined Inter Turku from his childhood club, KaaPo on a one-year contract on 18 January 2018. Järvistö had had a good 2017 season with KaaPo, scoring 17 goals in 20 games, and had already been on a few trials at Inter Turku before signing for the club.

On 1 August 2019 the club announced that Järvistö would be loaned out to his former club, KaaPo, for the rest of the year.
