= Tatu Miettunen =

Finnish footballer (born 1995)

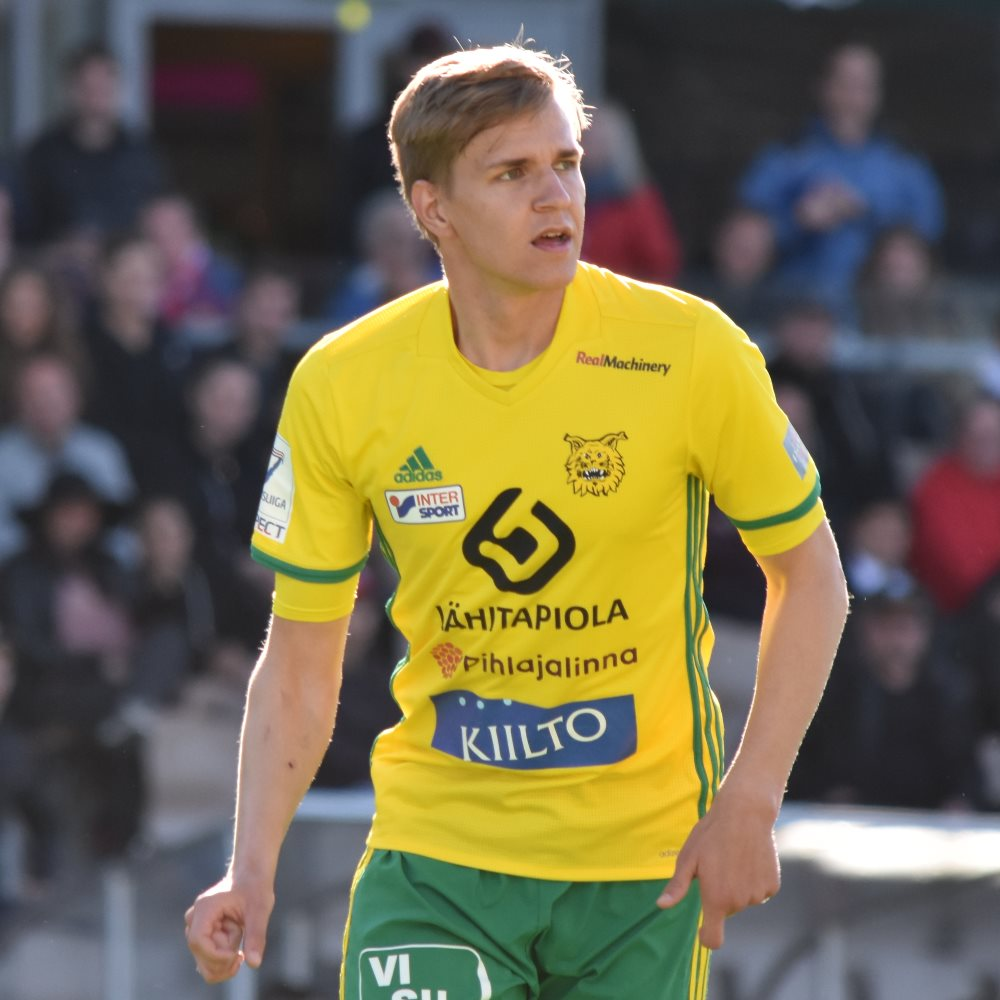
- Miettunen with Ilves in 2017

Personal information
- Date of birth: 24 April 1995 (age 31)
- Place of birth: Mänttä, Finland
- Height: 1.85 m (6 ft 1 in)
- Position: Defender

Team information
- Current team: Ilves
- Number: 16

Youth career
- 1999–2000: Valo
- 2001–2014: Ilves

Senior career*
Years	Team	Apps	(Gls)
2014–	Ilves	312	(16)
2014	→ Ilves-Kissat (loan)	2	(0)

International career
2016	Finland U21	1	(0)
- * Club domestic league appearances and goals as of 13 November 2026

Tatu Miettunen (born 24 April 1995) is a Finnish professional footballer who plays as a central defender for Finnish Premier Division club Ilves.

== Early career ==
Born in Mänttä, Miettunen moved to Pirkkala when he was five years old. He played in the youth sectors of Valo and Ilves.

== Club career ==
Miettunen debuted with Ilves first team in the second-tier Ykkönen in the 2014 season. After the promotion to top-tier Veikkausliiga for the 2015 season, Miettunen stayed with the club. With Ilves, Miettunen has won the Finnish Cup twice, in 2019 and 2023.

He is the captain of his team. On 17 October 2024, his deal was extended for the 2025 with an option for the 2026.

== Career statistics ==
As of 27 July 2026

Appearances and goals by club, season and competition
Club	Season	League			Cup		League cup		Europe		Total	
Club	Season	Division	Apps	Goals	Apps	Goals	Apps	Goals	Apps	Goals	Apps	Goals
Ilves	2014	Ykkönen	16	1	–		–		–		16	1
Ilves	2015	Veikkausliiga	21	0	0	0	4	0	–		25	0
Ilves	2016	Veikkausliiga	32	1	2	0	4	0	–		38	1
Ilves	2017	Veikkausliiga	29	2	7	0	–		–		36	2
Ilves	2018	Veikkausliiga	27	2	5	0	–		2 (Note: Includes UEFA Europa League)	0	34	2
Ilves	2019	Veikkausliiga	26	2	8	2	–		–		34	4
Ilves	2020	Veikkausliiga	18	0	5	1	–		1	0	24	1
Ilves	2021	Veikkausliiga	24	2	0	0	–		–		24	2
Ilves	2022	Veikkausliiga	21	1	2	0	4	0	–		27	1
Ilves	2023	Veikkausliiga	24	2	6	3	5	0	–		35	5
Ilves	2024	Veikkausliiga	26	1	1	0	6	0	4 (Note: Appearances in UEFA Conference League)	0	37	1
Ilves	2025	Veikkausliiga	25	2	1	0	6	0	3 (Note: One appearance in UEFA Europa League and two appearances in UEFA Conference League)	0	35	2
Ilves	2026	Veikkausliiga	14	0	4	0	4	1	3	0	25	1
Ilves	Total		303	16	41	6	33	1	13	0	390	23
Ilves-Kissat (loan)	2014	Kakkonen	2	0	–		–		–		2	0
Career total			305	16	41	6	33	1	13	0	392	23

== Honours ==
Ilves

- Finnish Cup: 2019, 2023
- Veikkausliiga runner-up: 2024
