= Vincent Ulundu =

Finnish footballer (born 2005)

Personal information
- Date of birth: 25 March 2005 (age 21)
- Place of birth: Helsinki, Finland
- Height: 1.80 m (5 ft 11 in)
- Position: Winger

Team information
- Current team: Inter Turku
- Number: 27

Youth career
- 2008–2010: HJK
- 2010–2018: Käpylän Pallo
- 2018–2023: Honka

Senior career*
Years	Team	Apps	(Gls)
2022–2023	Honka II	18	(2)
2023	Honka	8	(0)
2024–2025	Ilves	21	(3)
2026–	Inter Turku	17	(1)

International career^{‡}
2022–2023	Finland U18	8	(3)
2023	Finland U19	5	(0)
2025–	Finland U21	3	(0)
Medal record
Finland U18
First place	Baltic Cup	2023
Honka
Second place	Finnish Cup	2023
- * Club domestic league appearances and goals as of 12 November 2026 ‡ National team caps and goals as of 31 March 2026

Vincent Ulundu (born 25 March 2005) is a Finnish professional football player, who plays as a winger for Veikkausliiga club Inter Turku.

== Career ==
Ulundu started to play football in the youth sectors of HJK Helsinki and Käpylän Pallo.

=== Honka ===
He joined the Honka organisation in 2018, and was registered to their youth team.

Ulundu made his senior debut with Honka II reserve team in the third-tier Kakkonen in 2022. He debuted with the Honka first team on 21 January 2023, in a Finnish League Cup draw against IFK Mariehamn. Ulundu debuted in the Veikkausliiga on 22 September 2023, in a 3–0 home loss against VPS.

=== Ilves ===
On 26 November 2023, after Honka was declared for bankruptcy, a fellow Veikkausliiga club Ilves announced the signing of Ulundu on a two-year deal, with an option for a third year. He debuted with his new club on 27 January 2024, in a Finnish League Cup match against KuPS, scoring a goal in a 2–0 away win. On 17 May 2024, Ulundu scored his first goal in Veikkausliiga, an opening goal in a 5–0 home win against rival club FC Haka.

== International career ==
Ulundu has represented Finland at under-18 and under-19 youth national team levels.

He was part of the Finland U18 squad winning the friendly tournament Baltic Cup in June 2023, scoring two goals in three games.

In October 2023, he was part of the Finland U19 squad in the 2024 UEFA European Under-19 Championship qualification tournament, in three games against Romania, Czech Republic and San Marino.

== Personal life ==
Born and raised in Finland, Ulundu is of Congolese (DRC) descent. He lived briefly in England with his family, when aged between seven and eight. Growing up, he also played ice hockey until aged nine, when he chose football over it.

== Career statistics ==
As of 1 April 2026

Appearances and goals by club, season and competition
Club	Season	Division	League		National cup (Note: Includes Finnish Cup)		League cup (Note: Includes Finnish League Cup)		Europe		Total	
Club	Season	Division	Apps	Goals	Apps	Goals	Apps	Goals	Apps	Goals	Apps	Goals
Honka Akatemia	2022	Kakkonen	4	0	—		—		—		4	0
Honka Akatemia	2023	Kakkonen	14	2	2	1	—		—		16	3
Honka Akatemia	Total		18	2	2	1	0	0	0	0	20	3
Honka	2023	Veikkausliiga	8	0	0	0	1	0	0	0	9	0
Ilves	2024	Veikkausliiga	9	2	1	0	6	2	1 (Note: Includes UEFA Conference League)	0	17	4
Ilves	2025	Veikkausliiga	12	1	1	0	5	0	4 (Note: Appearances in UEFA Europa League and UEFA Conference League)	0	22	1
Ilves	Total		21	3	2	0	11	2	5	0	39	5
Inter Turku	2026	Veikkausliiga	0	0	0	0	7	0	0	0	7	0
Career total			47	5	4	1	18	2	5	0	74	8

== Honours ==
Honka

- Finnish Cup runner-up: 2023

Ilves

- Veikkausliiga runner-up: 2024

Finland U18

- Baltic Cup: 2023
