= Antti Ulmanen =

Finnish footballer (born 1999)

Personal information
- Date of birth: 17 May 1999 (age 27)
- Height: 1.85 m (6 ft 1 in)
- Position: Forward

Team information
- Current team: HIFK

Youth career
- HJK

Senior career*
Years	Team	Apps	(Gls)
2015–2017	Klubi 04	10	(0)
2017–2018	HIFK	13	(2)
2017	→ Gnistan (loan)	2	(0)
2019–2020	EIF	36	(3)
2021	MP	25	(4)
2022	JäPS	22	(8)
2023	HIFK	25	(13)
2024	Tilikratis Lefkada	5	(0)
2024	TPS	22	(0)
2025–	HIFK	0	(0)

International career
2015–2016	Finland U17	5	(0)
- * Club domestic league appearances and goals as of 26 October 2024

Antti Ulmanen (born 17 May 1999) is a Finnish football player. He plays as a forward for Kolmonen side HIFK.

== Early career ==
Ulmanen played in the youth sector of HJK Helsinki. He also represented HJK youth team in the UEFA Youth League in 2015–16 and 2016–17.

== Club career ==
He made his Veikkausliiga debut for HIFK on 21 June 2017 in a game against JJK.

Ulmanen signed with Mikkelin Palloilijat (MP) for the 2021 season.

On 10 January 2022, he signed with JäPS.

On 14 December 2022, Ulmanen signed a contract with HIFK, returning to the club for the 2023 season. Ulmanen was named the Ykkönen Player of the Month for July 2023, after having scored seven goals in a 30-day span.

On 4 January 2024, Ulmanen moved to Greece and joined Greek Super League 2 club Tilikratis Lefkada.

In April 2024, Ulmanen returned to Finland and signed with Turun Palloseura (TPS) in the second-tier Ykkösliiga.

On 24 December 2024, Ulmanen signed with HIFK and returned to his former club. Since his last stint, HIFK was demoted to the fifth-tier Kolmonen due to bankruptcy.

== Career statistics ==
As of 26 October 2024.

Appearances and goals by club, season and competition
Club	Season	League			Cup (Note: Includes Suomen Cup)		League cup		Europe		Total	
Club	Season	Division	Apps	Goals	Apps	Goals	Apps	Goals	Apps	Goals	Apps	Goals
Klubi 04	2015	Kakkonen	1	0	–		–		–		1	0
Klubi 04	2016	Kakkonen	9	0	–		–		–		9	0
Klubi 04	2017	Kakkonen	0	0	3	4	–		–		3	4
Klubi 04	Total		10	0	3	4	0	0	0	0	13	4
HIFK	2017	Veikkausliiga	1	0	3	1	–		–		4	1
HIFK	2018	Ykkönen	12	2	5	3	–		–		17	5
HIFK	Total		13	2	8	4	0	0	0	0	21	6
HIFK II	2017	Kolmonen	12	13	–		–		–		12	13
HIFK II	2018	Kakkonen	6	1	–		–		–		6	1
HIFK II	Total		18	14	0	0	0	0	0	0	18	14
Gnistan (loan)	2017	Ykkönen	2	0	–		–		–		2	0
Ekenäs IF	2019	Ykkönen	23	2	4	2	–		–		27	4
Ekenäs IF	2020	Ykkönen	13	1	4	0	–		–		17	1
Ekenäs IF	Total		36	3	8	2	0	0	0	0	44	5
EIF Akademi	2019	Kolmonen	2	2	–		–		–		2	2
EIF Akademi	2020	Kolmonen	6	3	–		–		–		6	3
EIF Akademi	Total		8	5	0	0	0	0	0	0	8	5
MP	2021	Ykkönen	25	4	3	2	–		–		28	6
JäPS	2022	Ykkönen	22	8	4	1	4	1	–		30	10
HIFK	2023	Ykkönen	25	13	4	2	4	3	–		33	18
Tilikratis Lefkada	2023–24	Super League Greece 2	5	0	0	0	–		–		5	0
TPS	2024	Ykkösliiga	22	0	5	1	0	0	–		27	1
HIFK	2025	Kolmonen	0	0	0	0	–		–		0	0
Career total			186	50	35	16	8	4	0	0	231	70

== Honours ==
HIFK

- Ykkönen Player of the Month: July 2023
