= Magnus Breitenmoser =

Swiss footballer (born 1998)

Personal information
- Date of birth: 6 August 1998 (age 28)
- Place of birth: Wil, Switzerland
- Height: 1.83 m (6 ft 0 in)
- Position: Midfielder

Youth career
- 2007–2009: Wil
- 2009–2013: St. Gallen
- 2013–2015: Tobel-Affeltrangen
- 2015–2016: Wil

Senior career*
| Years | Team | Apps | (Gls) |
| 2016–2019 | Wil | 61 | (3) |
| 2019–2020 | Schaffhausen | 9 | (0) |
| 2020–2022 | Thun | 15 | (0) |
| 2021–2022 | → AC Oulu (loan) | 42 | (3) |
| 2023 | AC Oulu | 12 | (2) |

International career
| 2017 | Switzerland U19 | 1 | (0) |
| 2018–2019 | Switzerland U20 | 7 | (0) |
- * Club domestic league appearances and goals as of 6 October 2023

Magnus Breitenmoser (born 6 August 1998) is a Swiss professional footballer, who most recently played as a midfielder for Finnish Veikkausliiga club AC Oulu.

== Professional career ==
On 13 March 2020, Breitenmoser signed a professional contract with FC Thun. Breitenmoser made his professional debut with Thun in a 5-1 Swiss Super League win over Servette FC on 22 July 2020.

== International career ==
Breitenmoser was born in Switzerland to a Swiss father and Kenyan mother. He is a youth international for Switzerland.
