= Adam Larsson (footballer) =

Swedish footballer

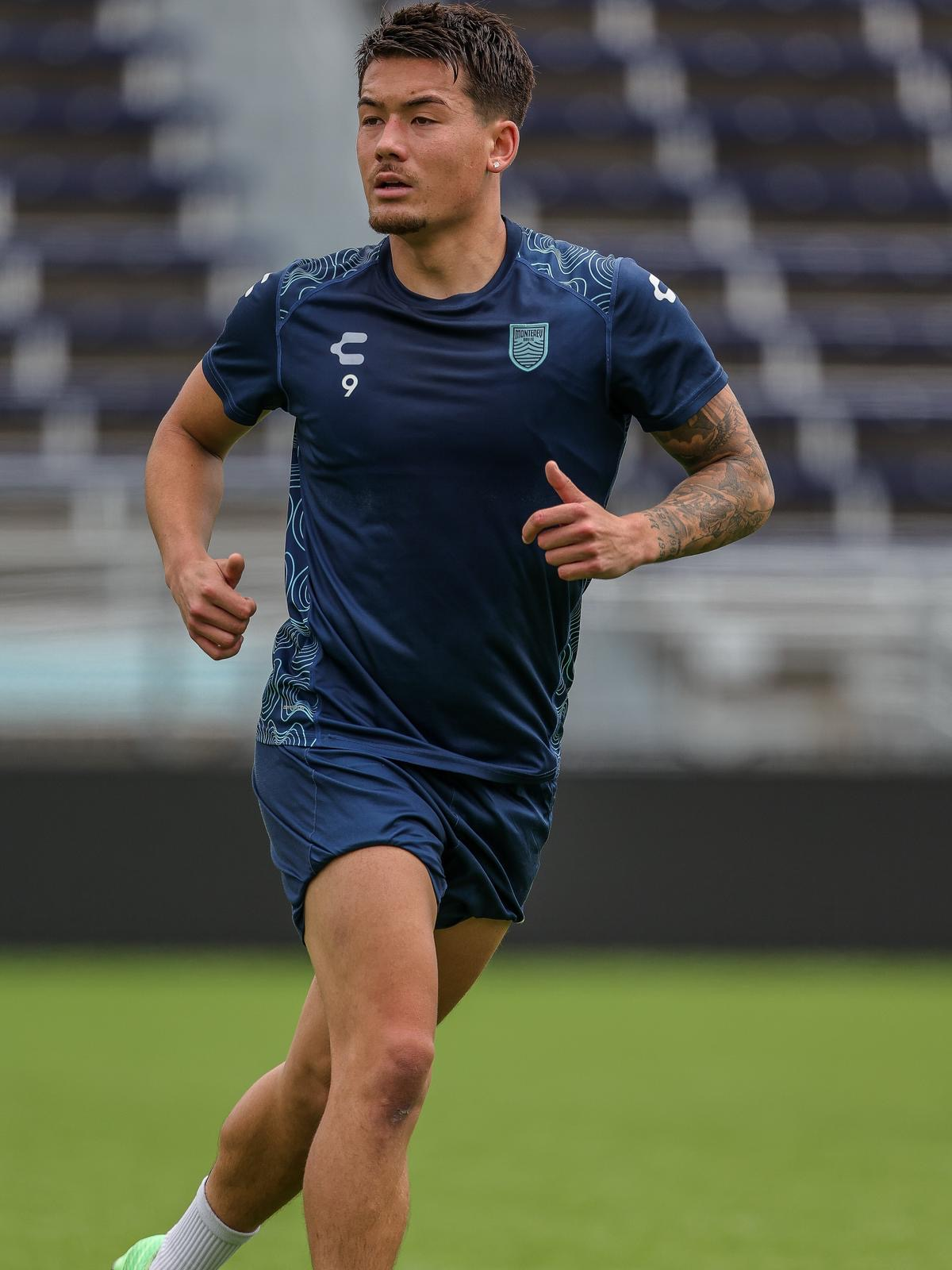
- Adam Larsson training with Monterey Bay in 2025.

Personal information
- Full name: Adam Mikael Larsson
- Date of birth: 5 September 1999 (age 27)
- Place of birth: Motala, Sweden
- Height: 1.75 m (5 ft 9 in)
- Position: Forward

Team information
- Current team: IFK Mariehamn
- Number: 7

Senior career*
| Years | Team | Apps | (Gls) |
| 2019–2020 | Linköping City | 36 | (9) |
| 2020–2021 | AFC Eskilstuna | 21 | (2) |
| 2021 | → Åtvidabergs FF (loan) | 7 | (2) |
| 2021 | → Linköping City (loan) | 7 | (2) |
| 2022 | → Ekenäs IF (loan) | 13 | (12) |
| 2022–2023 | Ilves | 33 | (5) |
| 2023 | AFC Eskilstuna | 8 | (2) |
| 2024 | IFK Mariehamn | 25 | (11) |
| 2025 | Monterey Bay | 12 | (1) |
| 2025 | Hvidovre | 0 | (0) |
| 2026– | IFK Mariehamn | 21 | (4) |
- * Club domestic league appearances and goals as of 13 November 2026

Adam Mikael Larsson (born 5 September 1999) is a Swedish professional footballer who plays as a forward for IFK Mariehamn in the Veikkausliiga.

== Career ==
Larsson signed his first professional contract with Swedish club FC Linköping City in 2019 and spent a season with the club before returning for his second stint in 2021.

From there, the forward joined AFC Eskilstuna in 2020, where he enjoyed loan stints with Åtvidabergs FF, FC Linköping City, and Finnish club Ekenäs IF. In 2023, Larsson returned to AFC near the end of the campaign.

While on loan with Ekenäs IF for his debut season in Finland in 2022, Larsson recorded an incredible 17 goals and one assist in just 21 matches across all competitions before signing with Ilves (football), where he tallied an additional nine goals and seven assists (all comps) over the next season and half.

Larsson returned to Finland on 22 January 2024, signing a one-year deal with Veikkausliiga side IFK Mariehamn. He scored 14 goals for the Finnish top-flight club.

On 24 January 2025, Larsson made his first official move stateside, signing a one-year deal with Monterey Bay FC in USL Championship.

On 18 September 2025 it was confirmed, that Larsson had joined Hvidovre IF in the Danish 1st Division. Larsson left Hvidovre after just 2.5 months without making his debut for the club. Shortly afterwards, it was announced that he would rejoin his former club, IFK Mariehamn, starting in 2026.

== Honours ==
Individual

- Ykkönen Player of the Month: May 2022
