= Yoonis Muse =

Finnish footballer (born 2000)

Personal information
- Date of birth: 11 May 2000 (age 26)
- Position: Midfielder

Team information
- Current team: Pargas IF

Senior career*
Years	Team	Apps	(Gls)
2017–2018	FC Inter Turku	1	(0)
2021–	Pargas IF	69	(6)
- * Club domestic league appearances and goals as of 20:55, 8 April 2024 (UTC)

Yoonis Muse (born 11 May 2000) is a Finnish professional footballer who plays for Pargas IF, as a midfielder.
