= Zakaria Abahassine =

Finnish footballer (born 1988)

Personal information
- Date of birth: 23 July 1988 (age 38)
- Place of birth: Finland
- Height: 1.80 m (5 ft 11 in)
- Position: Forward

Team information
- Current team: JIPPO

Youth career
- 1998–2008: JJK

Senior career*
Years	Team	Apps	(Gls)
2008–2010	JJK	47	(1)
2011–2012	RoPS	29	(2)
2012–2017	STPS		
2017–	JIPPO		
- * Club domestic league appearances and goals

Zakaria Abahassine (born 23 July 1988) is a Finnish football player currently playing for Jippo. His father is Moroccan and his mother is Finnish.
