= Lasse Lagerblom =

Finnish footballer (born 1980)

Personal information
- Date of birth: 27 February 1980 (age 46)
- Place of birth: Lahti, Finland
- Position: Defender

Youth career
- Reipas Lahti

Senior career*
Years	Team	Apps	(Gls)
1998–2001	Pallo-Lahti	46	(1)
2000–2005	Lahti	54	(4)
2005	→ Someron Voima (loan)	2	(1)
2006–2007	Honka	17	(1)
2007	→ Hämeenlinna (loan)	1	(0)
2008	PK Keski-Uusimaa	11	(0)
- * Club domestic league appearances and goals

Lasse Lagerblom (born 27 February 1980) is a Finnish former professional footballer who played as a defender.

After his playing career, Lagerblom worked as a physiotherapist for Lahti, HJK Helsinki during 2012–2013, NJS and the Finland national team.

== Personal life ==
His younger brother Pekka is also a former professional footballer.
