= Asaad Babiker =

Finnish footballer (born 2003)

Personal information
- Date of birth: 31 August 2003 (age 23)
- Place of birth: Cairo, Egypt
- Height: 1.82 m (6 ft 0 in)
- Position: Winger

Team information
- Current team: Lahti
- Number: 24

Youth career
- 2015–2021: Reipas Lahti

Senior career*
Years	Team	Apps	(Gls)
2021–	Reipas Lahti	65	(22)
2021–	Lahti	29	(1)

International career
- Finland U16
- * Club domestic league appearances and goals as of 23 November 2025

Asaad Babiker (Arabic: اسعد بابكر; born 31 August 2003) is a Finnish professional footballer who plays as a winger for Ykkösliiga club FC Lahti.

== Club career ==
Born in Cairo, Egypt, Babiker is of Sudanese descent. He immigrated to Finland as a child, and following pressure from a school classmate, joined the academy of Reipas Lahti at the age of eleven. In 2021, he signed his first contract with the club's parent side, Lahti, allowing him to represent both teams in official competitions. In February of the same year, he made his professional debut, coming on as a late second-half substitute for Lassi Forss in a 1–1 Finnish Cup draw with HJK Helsinki on 6 February.

In his first season, he featured predominantly for Reipas in the third-tier Kakkonen, scoring four goals, including a brace against KuFu-98 in August. The following year he failed to feature for Lahti, despite scoring eight goals in twenty-two Kakkonen appearances for Reipas.

He returned to Lahti's first team again on 28 January 2023, coming on as a second-half substitute for Daniel Koskipalo in a Finnish League Cup game, as Lahti lost 2–0 to Honka. His prolific goal-scoring form for Reipas continued, as he scored another brace in a 3–1 win against Tikkurilan Palloseura (TiPS) on 26 August.

On 25 January 2024, Babiker signed a new professional contract with FC Lahti first team for the 2024 season. He debuted in Veikkausliiga on 6 April 2024 in the opening game of the 2024 season against Ilves, as a substitute to Luke Ivanovic.

== International career ==
Babiker was called up to a Finnish under-16 regional camp in November 2018.

== Career statistics ==
As of 21 May 2025

Appearances and goals by club, season and competition
Club	Season	League			National Cup (Note: Includes Finnish Cup)		League cup (Note: Includes Finnish League Cup and Ykkösliigacup)		Continental		Total	
Club	Season	Division	Apps	Goals	Apps	Goals	Apps	Goals	Apps	Goals	Apps	Goals
Reipas Lahti	2021	Kakkonen	17	4	0	0	—		—		17	4
Reipas Lahti	2022	Kakkonen	22	8	0	0	—		—		22	8
Reipas Lahti	2023	Kakkonen	23	6	2	2	—		—		25	8
Reipas Lahti	2024	Kakkonen	3	4	—		—		—		3	4
Reipas Lahti	Total		65	22	2	2	0	0	0	0	67	24
Lahti	2021	Veikkausliiga	0	0	2	0	—		—		2	0
Lahti	2022	Veikkausliiga	0	0	0	0	0	0	—		0	0
Lahti	2023	Veikkausliiga	0	0	0	0	1	0	—		1	0
Lahti	2024	Veikkausliiga	18	0	3	1	6	1	—		27	2
Lahti	2025	Ykkösliiga	6	1	1	1	5	0	–		12	2
Lahti	Total		24	1	6	2	12	1	—		42	4
Career total			89	23	8	4	12	1	–	–	109	28
