= Kaarinan Pojat =

Finnish football club

- Full name: Kaarinan Pojat
- Nickname: KaaPo
- Founded: 1932
- Ground: Kaarinan urheilukenttä, Kaarina; Finland
- Chairman: Olli Tuominen
- Head Coach: Akusti Salonen
- Coach: Kim Ekroos (GK)
- League: Kakkonen
- 2009: 4th – Kakkonen (Group B)
Home colours	Away colours

Kaarinan Pojat (abbreviated KaaPo) is a football club from Kaarina in Finland. The club was formed in 1932 and their home ground is at the Kaarinan urheilukenttä. The men's football first team currently plays in the Kakkonen (Third Division ). The Chairman of KaaPo is Olli Tuominen.

== Background ==
Kaarinan Pojat was established on 1 October 1958 having been initiated by a young teacher from Loimaa, Olavi Kuikka. The founding meeting was held at Ylikylä school and Pauli Hollmén was elected as chairman and Olavi Kuikka as secretary. The executive committee consisted of Heikki Hallikainen, Veikko Polari, Raimo Åkerblom, Arvi Kukkonen and Pertti Kottonen.

The club progressed from its early roots and in 1976 Keijo Lindroos brought greater professionalism to the team's training which was born out by promotion of the men's first team to Division 3 in 1979. In 1991 the club gained promotion to the Kakkonen (Second Division) for the first time.

KaaPo have had two periods covering 18 seasons in the Kakkonen (Second Division), the third tier of Finnish football. The first spell was short-lived lasting just two seasons in 1992–93 but the second period has covered 16 consecutive seasons to date since 1995.

An important part of the club has been the development of the junior section since the 1960s which has brought many successes.

== Season to season ==
Season	Level	Division	Section	Administration	Position	Movements
2000	Tier 3	Kakkonen (Second Division)	West Group	Finnish FA (Suomen Pallolitto)	2nd	
2001	Tier 3	Kakkonen (Second Division)	West Group	Finnish FA (Suomen Pallolitto)	5th	
2002	Tier 3	Kakkonen (Second Division)	West Group	Finnish FA (Suomen Pallolitto)	6th	
2003	Tier 3	Kakkonen (Second Division)	West Group	Finnish FA (Suomen Pallolitto)	8th	
2004	Tier 3	Kakkonen (Second Division)	West Group	Finnish FA (Suomen Pallolitto)	9th	
2005	Tier 3	Kakkonen (Second Division)	West Group	Finnish FA (Suomen Pallolitto)	5th	
2006	Tier 3	Kakkonen (Second Division)	Group B	Finnish FA (Suomen Pallolitto)	4th	
2007	Tier 3	Kakkonen (Second Division)	Group B	Finnish FA (Suomen Pallolitto)	3rd	
2008	Tier 3	Kakkonen (Second Division)	Group B	Finnish FA (Suomen Pallolitto)	3rd	
2009	Tier 3	Kakkonen (Second Division)	Group B	Finnish FA (Suomen Pallolitto)	4th	
2010	Tier 3	Kakkonen (Second Division)	Group B	Finnish FA (Suomen Pallolitto)		

- 11 seasons in Kakkonen

== Club structure ==
KaaPo currently has 1 men's teams, 2 ladies teams, 6 boys teams and 5 girls team. The club organises various activities for its young players including group training and soccer schools.

== References and sources ==
- Official Website
- Finnish Wikipedia
- Suomen Cup
- Kaarinan Pojat Facebook
