= Oskari Sallinen =

Finnish footballer (born 2001)

Personal information
- Date of birth: 22 June 2001 (age 25)
- Place of birth: Finland
- Position: Midfielder

Team information
- Current team: Ekenäs
- Number: 13

Youth career
- 2012–2017: JJK
- 2017–2018: → Groningen (loan)
- 2018–2020: Groningen

Senior career*
| Years | Team | Apps | (Gls) |
| 2017–2018 | JJK | 1 | (0) |
| 2020–2021 | KuPS | 0 | (0) |
| 2021 | → EIF (loan) | 26 | (0) |
| 2022 | EIF | 26 | (10) |
| 2023–2024 | IFK Mariehamn | 34 | (3) |
| 2024–2026 | Haka | 27 | (0) |
| 2026– | EIF | 14 | (2) |

International career^{‡}
| 2016–2017 | Finland U16 | 6 | (0) |
| 2017–2018 | Finland U17 | 9 | (0) |
| 2018–2019 | Finland U18 | 3 | (0) |
| 2019 | Finland U19 | 4 | (0) |
- * Club domestic league appearances and goals as of 1 November 2026 ‡ National team caps and goals as of 16 November 2019

Oskari Sallinen (born 22 June 2001) is a professional Finnish football midfielder who plays for Ekenäs in Ykkösliiga.

== Career ==
=== JJK ===
He made his debut for JJK on 15 June 2017 in their Veikkausliiga 4–0 loss to HJK Helsinki.

==== Loan to FC Groningen ====
In the summer of 2017, Sallinen was loaned out to Groningen. Sallinen played for the club's U17 and U19 squads. The contract was a 1-year loan deal with the option to buy. The option was exercised and he spent two additional years in Groningen's youth teams.
