= 2012 Kakkonen =

Kakkonen
- Season: 2012
- Champions: ÅIFK; AC Kajaani; Ilves; JäPS
- Promoted: AC Kajaani; Ilves

The 2012 Kakkonen season began on 18 April and ended on 6 October 2012.

== Teams ==
A total of 40 teams contested the league divided into four groups, Eteläinen (Southern), Pohjoinen (Northern), Läntinen (Western) and Itäinen (Eastern). 30 returned from the 2011 season, three relegated from Ykkönen and seven promoted from Kolmonen. The champion of each group qualified to promotion matches to decide which two teams get promoted to the Ykkönen. The bottom two teams in each group and the worst eight-placed qualified directly for relegation to Kolmonen. Each team played a total of 27 matches, playing three times against each team of its group.

=== Stadia and Locations ===
Location of the 2012 Kakkonen teams. Eteläinen (Southern) are red dots, Pohjoinen (Northern) are green dots, Läntinen (Western) are blue dots while Itäinen (Eastern) are pink dots.
^{1}Klubi 04 plays in Eteläinen (Southern).

Team	Location	Stadium	Stadium capacity
ÅIFK	Turku	Urheilupuiston yläkenttä	1,500
AC Kajaani	Kajaani	Kajaanin Liikuntapuisto	800
Atlantis FC	Helsinki	Töölön Pallokentta	4,000
BK-46	Raseborg	Karjaan urheilukenttä	1,000
EIF	Raseborg	Ekenäs Centrumplan	2,500
EsPa	Espoo	Matinkylän tekonurmi	N/A
FC Santa Claus	Rovaniemi	Saarenkylän tekonurmi	2,000
FC Espoo	Espoo	Leppävaaran stadion	5,000
FC Futura	Porvoo	Porvoon keskuskenttä	500
FC Jazz	Pori	Porin Stadion	12,000
FC Kiffen	Helsinki	Töölön Pallokenttä	N/A
FC Kiisto	Vaasa	Kaarlen kenttä	5,500
FC Kuusysi	Lahti	Kisapuisto	4,400
FC YPA	Ylivieska	Safari	600
GBK	Kokkola	Kokkolan keskuskenttä	3,000
Gnistan	Helsinki	Fair Pay Arena	2,000
GrIFK	Kauniainen	Kauniaisten Keskuskenttä	700
Härmä	Hämeenlinna	Kauriala	4,000
HauPa	Haukipudas	Haukiputaan keskuskenttä	2,000
Ilves	Tampere	Tammela Stadion	5,040
JäPS	Järvenpää	Järvenpään keskuskenttä	500
JIlves	Jämsä	Jämsänkosken Pallokenttä	2,500
Klubi-04	Helsinki	Sonera Stadium	10,770
KPV	Kokkola	Kokkolan Keskuskenttä	2,000
KTP	Kotka	Arto Tolsa Areena	4,780
LoPa	Lohja	Harjun urheilukenttä	3,000
LPS	Helsinki	Laajasalon urheilupuisto	N/A
MP	Mikkeli	Mikkelin Urheilupuisto	7,000
Närpes Kraft	Närpes	Mosedal	2,000
P-Iirot	Rauma	Äijänsuon stadion	2,000
Pallohonka	Espoo	Otaniemen urheilukeskus	500
PK-35/VJS	Vantaa	ISS Stadion	4,700
PK-37	Iisalmi	Sankariniemi	5,000
PS Kemi	Kemi	Sauvosaari	1,500
SalPa	Salo	Salon Urheilupuisto	2,500
Sporting	Kristinestad	Kristinaplan	2,000
TP-47	Tornio	Pohjan Stadion	4,000
TPV	Tampere	Tammela Stadion	5,040
VIFK	Vaasa	Hietalahti Stadium	4,600
Warkaus JK	Varkaus	Varkauden Keskuskenttä	2,000

== League tables ==
=== Eteläinen (Southern) ===
Pos	Team	Pld	W	D	L	GF	GA	GD	Pts	Qualification or relegation
1	ÅIFK	27	17	5	5	50	25	+25	56	Qualification to Promotion playoffs
2	BK-46	27	16	3	8	55	35	+20	51	
3	SalPa	27	15	5	7	50	34	+16	50	
4	EIF	27	14	6	7	75	34	+41	48	
5	Klubi 04	27	13	6	8	64	36	+28	45	
6	GrIFK	27	12	6	9	64	35	+29	42	
7	Pallohonka	27	13	3	11	56	38	+18	42	
8	EsPa	27	9	1	17	46	59	−13	28	
9	FC Espoo (R)	27	7	2	18	48	61	−13	23	Relegation to Kolmonen
10	LoPa (R)	27	0	1	26	14	165	−151	1	Relegation to Kolmonen

Source: palloverkko.palloliitto.fi
Rules for classification: 1) points; 2) goal difference; 3) number of goals scored.
(R) Relegated

=== Pohjoinen (Northern) ===
Pos	Team	Pld	W	D	L	GF	GA	GD	Pts	Promotion or relegation
1	AC Kajaani (P)	24	15	4	5	53	33	+20	49	Qualification to Promotion playoffs
2	GBK	24	12	8	4	53	29	+24	44	
3	PS Kemi	24	12	3	9	52	37	+15	39	
4	PK-37	24	11	6	7	37	33	+4	39	
5	TP-47	24	8	5	11	39	42	−3	29	
6	FC YPA	24	9	2	13	41	45	−4	29	
7	KPV	24	7	7	10	30	39	−9	28	
8	FC Santa Claus AC (Note: FC Santa Claus AC was relegated from the Kakkonen due to bankruptcy.) (R)	24	6	6	12	29	54	−25	24	Relegation to Kolmonen
9	HauPa (R)	24	6	3	15	27	47	−20	21	Relegation to Kolmonen
10	Warkaus JK (Note: Warkaus JK was excluded from the Kakkonen due to breaking the rules of the association.) (R)	0	0	0	0	0	0	0	0	Relegation to Kolmonen

Source: palloverkko.palloliitto.fi
Rules for classification: 1) points; 2) goal difference; 3) number of goals scored.
(P) Promoted; (R) Relegated
Notes:

Note: The match PS Kemi – TP-47 originally finished 1–0, but the result was changed to 0–3, as PS Kemi fielded an ineligible player.

=== Läntinen (Western) ===
Pos	Team	Pld	W	D	L	GF	GA	GD	Pts	Qualification or relegation
1	Ilves (P)	27	22	4	1	84	21	+63	70	Qualification to Promotion playoffs
2	FC Jazz	27	17	6	4	58	23	+35	57	
3	P-Iirot	27	18	1	8	67	40	+27	55	
4	VIFK	27	14	10	3	46	25	+21	52	
5	Närpes Kraft	27	12	5	10	56	57	−1	41	
6	TPV	27	10	8	9	43	37	+6	38	
7	Härmä	27	7	5	15	38	59	−21	26	
8	Sporting (R)	27	6	3	18	33	58	−25	21	Relegation to Kolmonen
9	FC Kiisto (R)	27	3	4	20	20	68	−48	13	Relegation to Kolmonen
10	JIlves (R)	27	2	2	23	21	81	−60	8	Relegation to Kolmonen

Source: palloverkko.palloliitto.fi
Rules for classification: 1) points; 2) goal difference; 3) number of goals scored.
(P) Promoted; (R) Relegated

2. The match TPV – JIlves originally finished 1–1, but the result was changed to 3–0, as JIlves fielded an ineligible player.
3. The match JIlves – Ilves originally finished 3–5, but the result was changed to 0–3, as JIlves fielded an ineligible player.

=== Itäinen (Eastern) ===
Pos	Team	Pld	W	D	L	GF	GA	GD	Pts	Qualification or relegation
1	JäPS	27	16	5	6	59	33	+26	53	Qualification to Promotion playoffs
2	Gnistan	27	15	7	5	46	26	+20	52	
3	MP	27	15	4	8	68	37	+31	49	
4	FC Kuusysi	27	12	4	11	45	39	+6	40	
5	Atlantis FC	27	11	6	10	54	43	+11	39	
6	KTP	27	10	7	10	43	54	−11	37	
7	FC Futura	27	9	6	12	48	58	−10	33	
8	LPS	27	9	5	13	37	50	−13	32	
9	FC Kiffen (R)	27	6	6	15	25	53	−28	24	Relegation to Kolmonen
10	PK-35/VJS (R)	27	5	4	18	23	55	−32	19	Relegation to Kolmonen

Source: palloverkko.palloliitto.fi
Rules for classification: 1) points; 2) goal difference; 3) number of goals scored.
(R) Relegated

4. The match Gnistan – Atlantis FC originally finished 0–1, but the result was changed to 3–0, as Atlantis FC fielded an ineligible player.

=== Promotion play-offs ===
Group winners will play two-legged ties. Team pairs will be drawn and the two winning teams will be promoted to the Ykkönen for season 2013.

Group winners
Eteläinen (Southern): ÅIFK
Pohjoinen (Northern): AC Kajaani
Läntinen (Western): Ilves
Itäinen (Eastern): JäPS

==== First leg ====
13 October 2012

JäPS	0–0	AC Kajaani

Attendance: 753

13 October 2012

ÅIFK	0–1	Ilves
		Multanen 11'

Attendance: 902

==== Second leg ====
20 October 2012

AC Kajaani	1–0	JäPS
Nikkanen 61'

Attendance: 980

AC Kajaani won 1–0 on aggregate.

20 October 2012

Ilves	4–1	ÅIFK
Vakkala 3'; Scheweleff 11', 26'; Juuti 51'		Okorie 88'

Attendance: 3,841

Ilves won 5–1 on aggregate.

=== Eight-placed teams ===
At the end of the season, a comparison is made between the eight-placed teams. The worst eight-placed team will be directly relegated to the Kolmonen.

Pos	Grp	Team	Pld	W	D	L	GF	GA	GD	Pts	Relegation
1	East	LPS	27	9	5	13	37	50	−13	32	
2	South	EsPa	27	9	1	17	46	59	−13	28	
3	North	FC Santa Claus AC	24	6	6	12	29	54	−25	24	
4	West	Sporting (R)	27	6	3	18	33	58	−25	21	Relegation to Kolmonen

Rules for classification: 1) points; 2) goal difference; 3) number of goals scored.
(R) Relegated

== See also ==
- 2012 Veikkausliiga
- 2012 Finnish League Cup
- 2012 Suomen Cup
- 2012 Ykkönen
