= Jukka Halme =

Finnish footballer (born 1985)

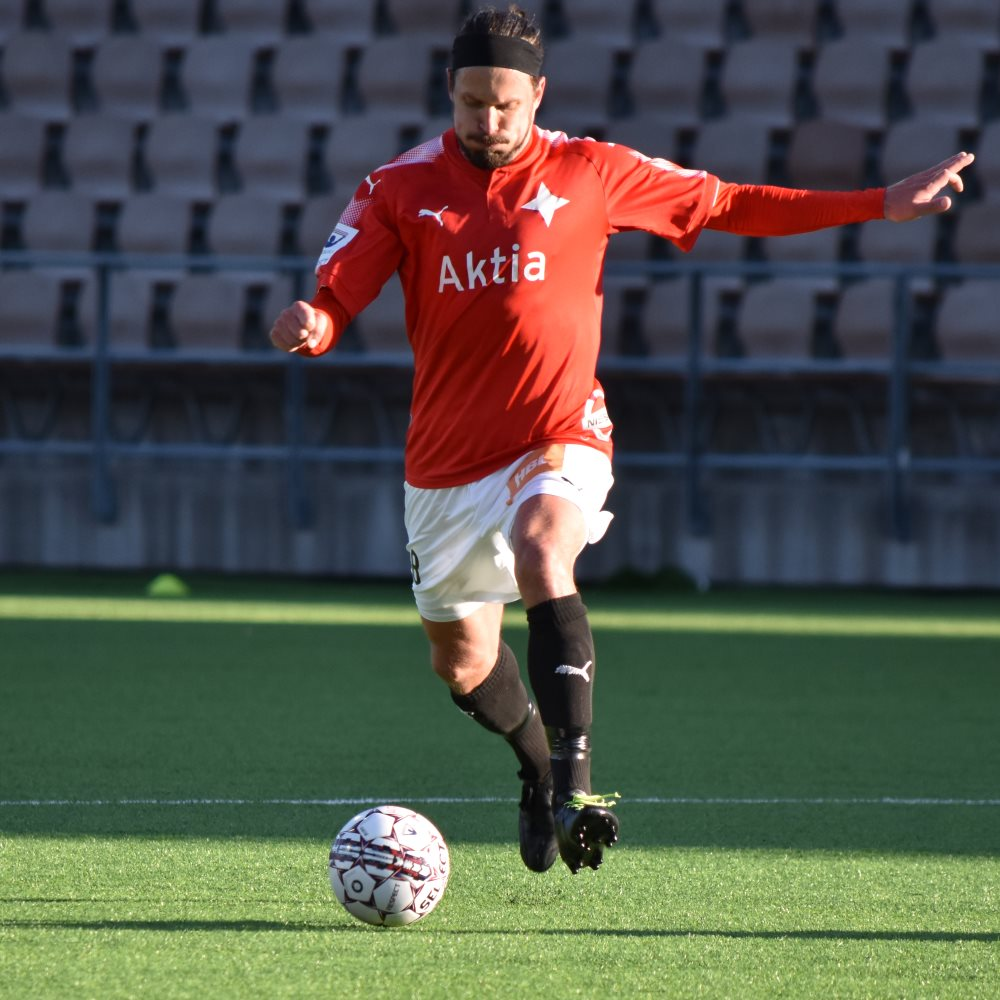

Personal information
- Date of birth: 29 May 1985 (age 41)
- Place of birth: Helsinki, Finland
- Height: 1.80 m (5 ft 11 in)
- Position: Midfielder

Youth career
- KäPa
- 1996–2000: HIFK
- 2001–2004: PK-35

Senior career*
Years	Team	Apps	(Gls)
2004–2006	PK-35	33	(1)
2007–2008	HIFK	20	(6)
2007	→ PK-35 (loan)	10	(0)
2009–2010	PK-35	27	(1)
2011–2022	HIFK	224	(24)
- * Club domestic league appearances and goals

Jukka Halme (born 29 May 1985) is a Finnish former footballer who played as a midfielder.

== Club career ==
Halme has played for HIFK in three highest tiers of Finnish football; Veikkausliiga, Ykkönen and Kakkonen. He made his Veikkausliiga debut in 2015 season opener against IFK Mariehamn. Halme has also played for PK-35. He was also the vice-captain of HIFK, commonly captaining the team in absence of Esa Terävä.
