= Juuti =

Juuti is a Finnish surname. Notable people with the surname include:

- Jaakko Juuti (born 1987), Finnish footballer
- Sakari Juuti (born 1931), Finnish diplomat and lawyer
- Olivia Yli-Juuti (born 2001), Finnish gymnast
