= Hussein Mohamed =

Somali footballer (born 1997)

Personal information
- Full name: Hussein Abdikarim Mohamed
- Date of birth: 20 March 1997 (age 29)
- Place of birth: Mogadishu, Somalia
- Height: 1.81 m (5 ft 11 in)
- Position: Winger

Team information
- Current team: PK-35
- Number: 77

Youth career
- 2006–2014: Viikingit

Senior career*
| Years | Team | Apps | (Gls) |
| 2014 | Viikingit | 1 | (0) |
| 2016 | Klubi 04 | 4 | (1) |
| 2017 | Viikingit | 20 | (7) |
| 2018–2019 | HIFK | 23 | (1) |
| 2018 | HIFK 2 | 1 | (0) |
| 2020 | AC Kajaani | 21 | (5) |
| 2021 | Haka | 10 | (0) |
| 2022 | PK-35 | 24 | (6) |
| 2023 | JäPS | 16 | (5) |
| 2024 | Atlantis | 21 | (5) |
| 2025– | PK-35 | 12 | (1) |

International career^{‡}
| 2019– | Somalia | 8 | (0) |
- * Club domestic league appearances and goals as of 24 November 2025 ‡ National team caps and goals as of 17:20, 3 April 2022 (UTC)

Hussein Abdikarim Mohamed (Somali: Xusen Cabdikariim Maxamed; born 20 March 1997) is a Somali footballer who plays as a winger for Finnish Ykkösliiga club PK-35 and the Somalia national team.

== International career ==
Mohamed represented the Somalia national team in a 3–2 2022 FIFA World Cup qualification loss to Zimbabwe on 10 September 2019.

== Personal life ==
He holds Finnish citizenship.
