= Lassi Viholainen =

Finnish footballer (born 1999)

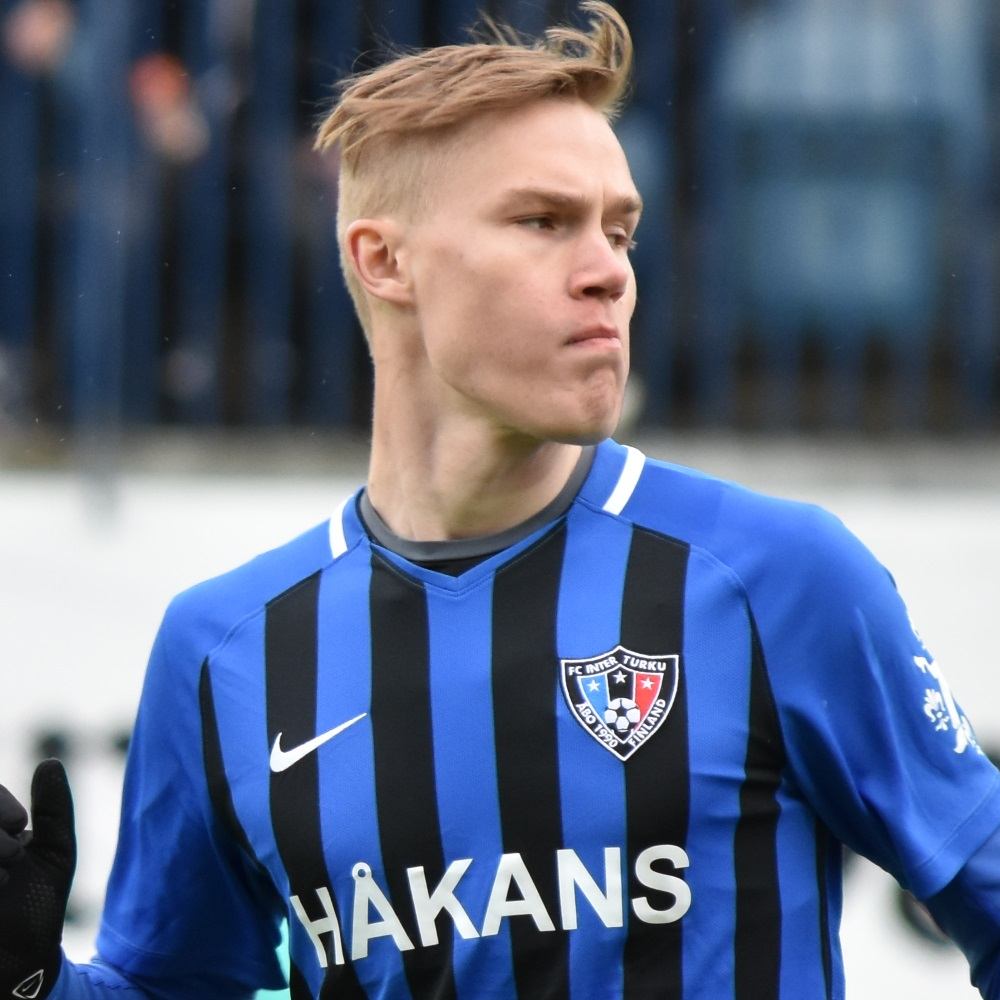

Personal information
- Date of birth: 16 June 1999 (age 27)
- Place of birth: Finland
- Height: 1.82 m (6 ft 0 in)
- Position: Winger

Youth career
- TPS
- 2016–2017: Inter Turku

Senior career*
Years	Team	Apps	(Gls)
2017–2019	Inter Turku	23	(1)
2019	→ AC Kajaani (loan)	4	(0)
- * Club domestic league appearances and goals as of 21:24, 18 November 2019 (UTC)

Lassi Viholainen (born 16 June 1999) is a Finnish professional footballer who plays as a winger.

== Career ==
Viholainen is a product of TPS. He joined FC Inter Turku in 2016.

In July 2019, Viholainen was loaned out to AC Kajaani for the rest of the year. However, he was recalled already on 8 August 2019.
