= Gullit Zolameso =

Finnish footballer (born 1995)

Personal information
- Date of birth: 2 June 1995 (age 31)
- Place of birth: Cabinda, Angola
- Height: 1.63 m (5 ft 4 in)
- Position: Right back

Team information
- Current team: RiPS

Youth career
- Ylöjärven Ilves
- –2011: Ilves

Senior career*
Years	Team	Apps	(Gls)
2011–2015	Ilves	66	(5)
2014	→ Ilves-Kissat (loan)	2	(1)
2015	→ AC Kajaani (loan)	13	(3)
2016	MPS	16	(5)
2017–2019	Gnistan	49	(4)
2020	AC Kajaani	17	(0)
2021–2022	Reipas Lahti	30	(8)
2023–2024	JäPS	25	(2)
2025–	RiPS	0	(0)

International career
- Finland U15
2013	Finland U18	1	(0)
2014	Finland U19	1	(0)
- * Club domestic league appearances and goals as of 26 October 2024

Gullit Zolameso (born 2 June 1995) is a Finnish footballer who plays as a right back for RiPS.

== Early life ==
Zolameso was born in Cabinda, Angola, and moved to Ylöjärvi, Finland, in 2005 when aged 10. He received a Finnish citizenship in 2013.

== Club career ==
Zolameso made his Veikkausliiga debut with Ilves in the 2015 season.

On 20 February 2016, Zolameso moved to Helsinki and signed with Malmin Palloseura (MPS) in third-tier Kakkonen.

On 21 January 2017, he joined another Helsinki-based club IF Gnistan. After three seasons with Gnistan, he played for AC Kajaani in second-tier Ykkönen in the 2020 season.

During 2021–2022, he played for Reipas Lahti.

Since the start of the 2023 season, Zolameso has played for Järvenpään Palloseura (JäPS).

== Honours ==
JäPS

- Ykköscup: 2023
