= Ayuub Abdi =

Somali footballer (born 1996)

Personal information
- Date of birth: 8 October 1996 (age 30)
- Place of birth: Finland
- Height: 1.82 m (6 ft 0 in)
- Position: Midfielder

Team information
- Current team: PK-35
- Number: 4

Senior career*
Years	Team	Apps	(Gls)
2014–2020	Viikingit	60	(4)
2020–2022	JäPS	35	(0)
2023–	PK-35	45	(0)

International career^{‡}
2022–	Somalia	1	(0)
- * Club domestic league appearances and goals as of 18 October 2026 ‡ National team caps and goals as of 06:23, 26 March 2022 (UTC)

Ayuub Abdi (born 8 October 1996) is a Somali professional footballer who plays as a midfielder for Finnish Ykkösliiga club PK-35 and the Somalia national team.

== Club career ==
Abdi began his senior career with Viikingit in the Finnish Ykkönen, and moved to JäPS for the start of the 2021 season.

On 30 March 2023, Abdi signed with PK-35 for the 2023 season.

== International career ==
Abdi debuted with the Somalia national team in a 3–0 2023 Africa Cup of Nations qualification loss to Eswatini on 23 March 2022.
