= Erik Holmgren =

Finnish footballer (born 1964)

Personal information
- Full name: Erik Holmgren
- Date of birth: 17 December 1964 (age 61)
- Place of birth: Porvoo, Finland
- Position: Defender

Senior career*
Years	Team	Apps	(Gls)
1984–1988	HJK Helsinki	101	(8)
1988–1993	GAIS	89	(3)
1994–1995	FinnPa	49	(2)
1996–1998	PK-35	64	(6)
1999	Jokerit	14	(0)
1999	→ FinnPa (loan)	2	(0)

International career
1986–1995	Finland	60	(2)
- * Club domestic league appearances and goals

Erik Holmgren (born 17 December 1964) is a retired football defender.

During his club career, Holmgren played for HJK Helsinki, GAIS, FinnPa, PK-35 and Jokerit. He made 60 appearances for the Finland national team, scoring 2 goals.

== Career statistics ==
Appearances and goals by club, season and competition
Club	Season	League			Europe		Total	
Club	Season	Division	Apps	Goals	Apps	Goals	Apps	Goals
HJK Helsinki	1984	Mestaruussarja	6	1	1 (Note: Appearance(s) in UEFA Cup)	0	7	1
HJK Helsinki	1985	Mestaruussarja	25	0	4 (Note: Appearances in UEFA Cup Winners' Cup)	0	29	0
HJK Helsinki	1986	Mestaruussarja	21	1	2 (Note: Appearances in European Cup)	0	23	1
HJK Helsinki	1987	Mestaruussarja	22	1	–		22	1
HJK Helsinki	1988	Mestaruussarja	27	5	2	0	29	5
HJK Helsinki	Total		101	8	9	0	110	8
GAIS	1989	Allsvenskan	22	1	–		22	1
GAIS	1990	Allsvenskan	21	1	4 (Note: Appearances in UEFA Intertoto Cup and UEFA Cup)	0	25	1
GAIS	1991	Allsvenskan	17	0	–		17	0
GAIS	1992	Allsvenskan	16	1	–		16	1
GAIS	1993	Swedish Division 1	13	0	–		13	0
GAIS	Total		89	3	4	0	93	3
FinnPa	1994	Veikkausliiga	23	1	–		23	1
FinnPa	1995	Veikkausliiga	26	1	–		26	1
FinnPa	Total		49	2	0	0	49	2
PK-35	1996	Kakkonen	13	1	–		13	1
PK-35	1997	Ykkönen	26	1	–		26	1
PK-35	1998	Veikkausliiga	25	4	–		25	4
PK-35	Total		64	6	0	0	64	6
Jokerit	1999	Veikkausliiga	14	0	5 (Note: Appearances in UEFA Intertoto Cup)	0	19	0
FinnPa (loan)	1999	Ykkönen	2	0	–		2	0
Career total			319	19	18	0	337	19
