= Reza Heidari =

Finnish–Iranian footballer (born 1996)

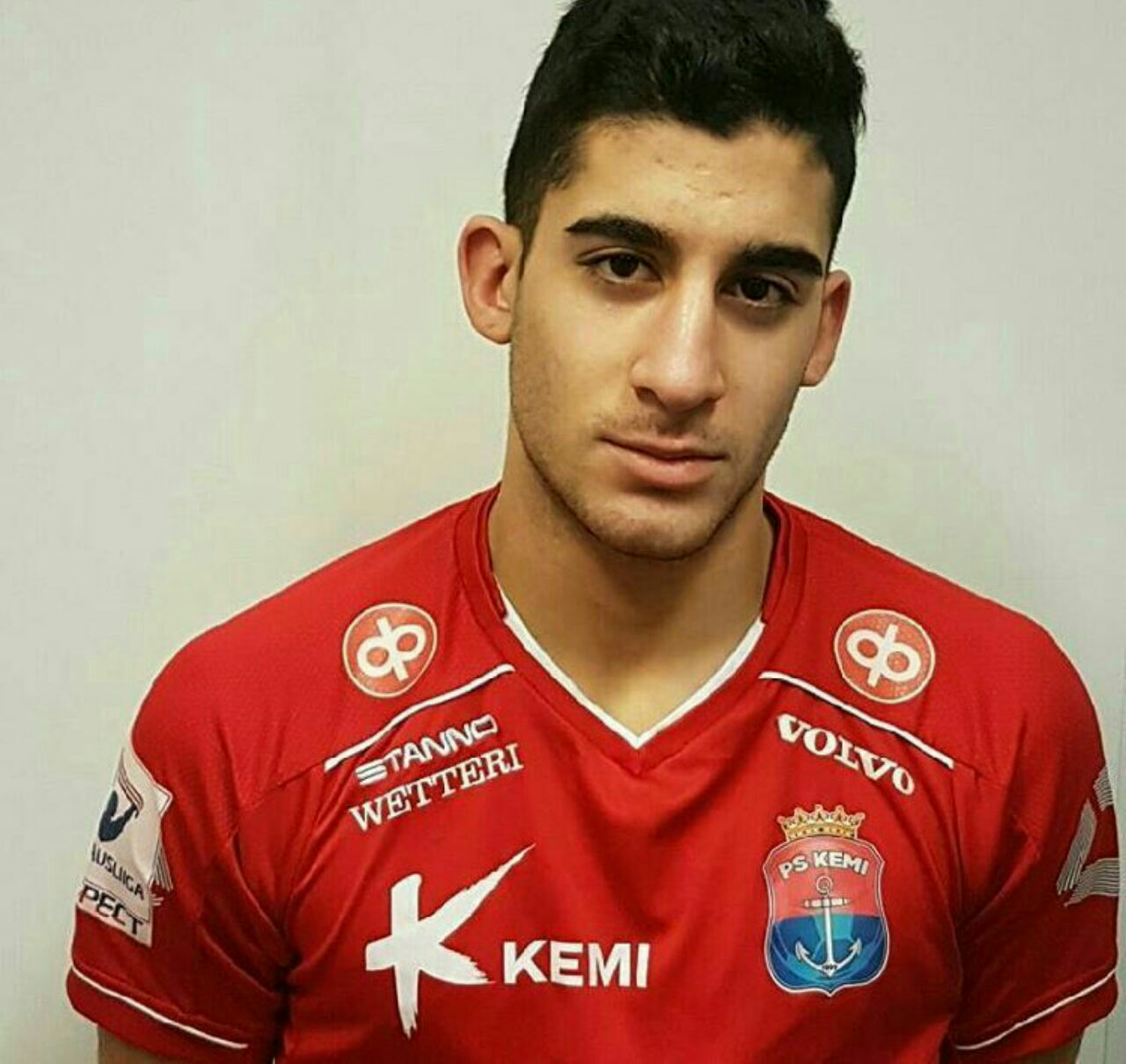
- Heidari with PS-Kemi in 2018

Personal information
- Date of birth: 18 April 1996 (age 30)
- Place of birth: Tampere, Finland
- Height: 1.74 m (5 ft 9 in)
- Position: Midfielder

Team information
- Current team: JäPS
- Number: 8

Youth career
- 2007–2011: VPS
- 2012–2014: Honka

Senior career*
| Years | Team | Apps | (Gls) |
| 2014 | Pallohonka | 20 | (0) |
| 2014 | Honka | 1 | (0) |
| 2015–2016 | PK-35 Vantaa | 19 | (0) |
| 2015 | → NJS (loan) | 3 | (0) |
| 2017 | PS Kemi | 3 | (0) |
| 2017 | Gnistan | 1 | (0) |
| 2018 | HIFK | 3 | (0) |
| 2018 | HIFK II | 3 | (0) |
| 2020 | AC Kajaani | 17 | (0) |
| 2021 | EIF | 6 | (0) |
| 2021–2023 | JäPS | 54 | (3) |
| 2024 | KäPa | 0 | (0) |
| 2024 | PK-35 | 2 | (0) |
| 2025– | JäPS | 24 | (1) |
- * Club domestic league appearances and goals as of 1 November 2026

Reza Heidari (Persian: رضا حیدری; born 18 April 1996) is a Finnish-Iranian professional footballer who plays as a midfielder for Ykkösliiga club JäPS.

== Club career ==
On 30 August 2024, Heidari signed with Ykkösliiga club PK-35 for the remainder of the season.

== Career statistics ==
As of 26 October 2024

| Club | Season | Division | League | | Cup | | Other | | Total | |
| Club | Season | Division | Apps | Goals | Apps | Goals | Apps | Goals | Apps | Goals |
|---|---|---|---|---|---|---|---|---|---|---|
| Pallohonka | 2014 | Kakkonen | 20 | 0 | 1 | 0 | — | | 21 | 0 |
| Honka | 2014 | Veikkausliiga | 1 | 0 | 0 | 0 | — | | 1 | 0 |
| PK-35 Vantaa | 2015 | Ykkönen | 1 | 0 | 2 | 0 | 0 | 0 | 3 | 0 |
| PK-35 Vantaa | 2016 | Veikkausliiga | 18 | 0 | 0 | 0 | 2 | 0 | 20 | 0 |
| PK-35 Vantaa | Total | | 19 | 0 | 2 | 0 | 2 | 0 | 23 | 0 |
| NJS (loan) | 2015 | Kakkonen | 3 | 0 | 0 | 0 | — | | 3 | 0 |
| PS Kemi | 2017 | Veikkausliiga | 3 | 0 | 4 | 0 | — | | 7 | 0 |
| FC Kemi | 2017 | Kolmonen | 3 | 0 | — | | — | | 3 | 0 |
| Gnistan | 2017 | Ykkönen | 1 | 0 | 0 | 0 | — | | 1 | 0 |
| HIFK | 2018 | Ykkönen | 3 | 0 | 4 | 0 | — | | 7 | 0 |
| HIFK II | 2018 | Kakkonen | 3 | 0 | 0 | 0 | — | | 3 | 0 |
| AC Kajaani | 2020 | Ykkönen | 17 | 0 | 4 | 0 | – | | 21 | 0 |
| EIF | 2021 | Ykkönen | 6 | 0 | 1 | 0 | – | | 7 | 0 |
| EIF Akademi | 2021 | Kolmonen | 2 | 0 | – | | – | | 2 | 0 |
| JäPS | 2021 | Kakkonen | 8 | 2 | – | | – | | 8 | 2 |
| JäPS | 2022 | Ykkönen | 23 | 1 | 4 | 1 | 3 | 0 | 30 | 2 |
| JäPS | 2023 | Ykkönen | 23 | 0 | 3 | 1 | 6 | 0 | 32 | 1 |
| JäPS | Total | | 54 | 3 | 7 | 2 | 9 | 0 | 70 | 5 |
| KäPa | 2024 | Ykkösliiga | 0 | 0 | 0 | 0 | 1 | 0 | 1 | 0 |
| PK-35 | 2024 | Ykkösliiga | 2 | 0 | – | | – | | 2 | 0 |
| JäPS | 2025 | Ykkösliiga | 0 | 0 | 0 | 0 | 0 | 0 | 0 | 0 |
| Career total | | | 137 | 5 | 23 | 2 | 13 | 0 | 173 | 7 |
