= Samuel Tammivuori =

Finnish footballer (born 2000)

Personal information
- Date of birth: 19 August 2000 (age 26)
- Place of birth: Finland
- Positions: Winger; defender

Team information
- Current team: GIF Sundsvall
- Number: 11

Youth career
- HJK

Senior career*
Years	Team	Apps	(Gls)
2018–2019	Klubi 04	27	(2)
2020–2021	NJS	29	(2)
2022	Honka II	26	(9)
2023–2024	Käpylän Pallo	50	(4)
2023	→ Futura (loan)	2	(1)
2025–	GIF Sundsvall	30	(0)
- * Club domestic league appearances and goals as of 12 November 2026

Samuel Tammivuori (born 19 August 2000) is a Finnish professional footballer who plays as a winger or defender for Swedish club GIF Sundsvall.

== Career ==
After playing in HJK Helsinki youth sector, Tammivuori made his senior debut with the club's reserve team Klubi 04 in 2018. He has also played for Nurmijärven Jalkapalloseura, Honka Akatemia and Käpylän Pallo.

In late March 2025, Tammivuori spent time on a trial with Swedish Superettan club GIF Sundsvall, invited by the head coach Erol Ates. On 8 April, Tammivuori officially signed with GIF Sundsvall for the 2025 season.
