= AC Kajaani =

Football club from Kajaani, Finland

- Full name: AC Kajaani
- Founded: 2006
- Dissolved: 2020
- Ground: Kajaanin liikuntapuisto, Kajaani, Finland
- Chairman: Arvo Toivainen
- Manager: Mika Lumijärvi
- League: Ykkönen
| Home colours | Away colours |

AC Kajaani was a football club from Kajaani, Finland. The club was formed in 2006 after the merger of FC Tarmo and Kajaanin Palloilijat (KaPa). Their home ground was Kajaanin Liikuntapuisto. The men's football first team last played in the Ykkönen (the second highest level of football in Finland). The club dissolved in December 2020 following their relegation from the Ykkönen.

== History ==
AC Kajaani was founded in 2006 by a merger of Kajaanin Palloilijat (KaPa -- "Kajaani Ballers") and FC Tarmo. The newly merged club took over FC Tarmo's place in the Kolmonen—the fourth tier of the Finnish soccer league system—in the Northern Finland group. Arvo Toivainen was the chairman of the club. Only KaPa's adult men's team joined the new club; KaPa continued to operate their own youth clubs, with an affiliation with the new club. However, KaPa would eventually cease its youth football operations, which would not restart until 2014.

In the club's first four seasons, the club managed to finish in second place on all four occasions, missing out on promotion by small margins each time, including on goal difference in 2009 to city rival Kajaanin Haka.

In 2011, AC Kajaani finally won its long-awaited league title, earning promotion to the Kakkonen, in the Pohjoinen (Northern) group. The season was special for AC Kajaani as they completed an undefeated season, finishing with a league record of 17 wins and one draw, while winning once and drawing once against JPS in a 5–2 aggregate victory in the playoffs. Kajaani won the league title in its first year in the Kakkonen and defeated JäPS in the playoffs to earn a second straight promotion, to the Ykkönen, the second tier of the Finnish soccer league system.

In 2013, AC Kajaani endured a poor year in the Ykkönen, winning only three matches all season long, while earning a relegation back down to the Kakkonen. Back in the Kakkonen, AC Kajaani finished third in three consecutive seasons. A highlight from the 2016 season was AC Kajaani's deep run in the Suomen Cup, where they made it to the sixth round and hosted HJK, Finland's top football club, and took them to extra time, ultimately losing 5–1 in front of a club record 1,172 spectators. In 2017, Kajaani won the league title for Group C and winning the promotion playoffs against KTP.

In 2018, AC Kajaani experienced its most successful season, finishing in 8th place with 25 points while winning six matches and remaining in the Ykkönen for the following season, a feat Kajaani would repeat in 2019 with another 8th-place finish and 24 points.

In 2020, AC Kajaani renewed its partnership with KaPa Kajaani, who agreed to become the official youth team of AC Kajaani. In exchange for the new partnership, AC Kajaani agreed to change its colours from white and black to KaPa's traditional colours of blue and white.

In 2020, Kajaani planned for a large push to make it to the Veikkausliiga and spent €274,819 on player wages, second in the league. However, AC Kajaani's luck would run out when they were relegated on the final day of the season by Gnistan, despite winning their final match against KTP by a score of 4–1. Erfan Zeneli scored the club's final goal.

Following the 2020 season, chairman Arvo Toivainen announced that while the club was debt-free, he no longer had the ability to fund the club, having spent €1.7 million on the club thus far, including €250,000 in 2020 alone. He required a further investment of €350,000 from AC Kajaani's business partners in order to get the club back up to the Ykkönen, and upon receiving commitments for only €100,000, the decision was made to fold the club and cease operations. Following the fall of the club, criticism was made of the club's attempts to buy a quick path to success by importing foreign players, as opposed to investing in building up local talent; only Tatu Hoffrén was from Kajaani.

== Honours ==
- Kolmonen
  - Group Winners: 2011
- Kakkonen
  - Group Winners: 2012, 2017

== Season-to-season ==
Season to Season

| Season | Level | Division | Section | Administration | Position | Movements |
|---|---|---|---|---|---|---|
| 2007 | Tier 4 | Kolmonen (Third Division) | Northern Finland (Pohjois-Suomi) | | 2nd | |
| 2008 | Tier 4 | Kolmonen (Third Division) | Northern Finland (Pohjois-Suomi) | | 2nd | |
| 2009 | Tier 4 | Kolmonen (Third Division) | Northern Finland (Pohjois-Suomi) | | 2nd | |
| 2010 | Tier 4 | Kolmonen (Third Division) | Northern Finland (Pohjois-Suomi) | | 2nd | |
| 2011 | Tier 4 | Kolmonen (Third Division) | Northern Finland (Pohjois-Suomi) | | 1st | Promotion Playoff - Promoted |
| 2012 | Tier 3 | Kakkonen (Second Division) | Northern Group (Pohjoinen Iokho) | Finnish FA (Suomen Palloliitto) | 1st | Promotion Playoff - Promoted |
| 2013 | Tier 2 | Ykkönen (First Division) | | Finnish FA (Suomen Palloliitto) | 10th | Relegated |
| 2014 | Tier 3 | Kakkonen (Second Division) | Northern Group (Pohjoinen Iokho) | Finnish FA (Suomen Palloliitto) | 3rd | |
| 2015 | Tier 3 | Kakkonen (Second Division) | Northern Group (Pohjoinen Iokho) | Finnish FA (Suomen Palloliitto) | 3rd | |
| 2016 | Tier 3 | Kakkonen (Second Division) | Group C | Finnish FA (Suomen Palloliitto) | 3rd | |
| 2017 | Tier 3 | Kakkonen (Second Division) | Group C | Finnish FA (Suomen Palloliitto) | 1st | Promotion Playoff - Promoted |
| 2018 | Tier 2 | Ykkönen (First Division) | | Finnish FA (Suomen Palloliitto) | 8th | |
| 2019 | Tier 2 | Ykkönen (First Division) | | Finnish FA (Suomen Palloliitto) | 8th | |
| 2020 | Tier 2 | Ykkönen (First Division) | | Finnish FA (Suomen Palloliitto) | 10th | Relegated |

- 5 seasons in Kolmonen
- 5 season in Kakkonen
- 4 season in Ykkönen

== Final squad ==
As of 31 October 2020

Note: Flags indicate national team as defined under FIFA eligibility rules; some limited exceptions apply. Players may hold more than one non-FIFA nationality.

| No. | Pos. | Nation | Player |
|---|---|---|---|
| 1 | GK | FIN | Severi Ikäheimo |
| 2 | DF | FIN | Juuso Kemppainen |
| 3 | FW | SEN | Babacar Diop (on loan from TPS) |
| 3 | DF | CIV | Bauraux Amiri |
| 4 | DF | FIN | Tatu Hoffrén |
| 5 | DF | FIN | Mikko Pitkänen |
| 7 | MF | SOM | Hussein Mohamed |
| 8 | MF | FIN | Reza Heidari |
| 9 | FW | ROU | David Popa |
| 10 | FW | FIN | Tomi Kult |
| 11 | MF | FIN | Mauro Severino |

| No. | Pos. | Nation | Player |
|---|---|---|---|
| 12 | GK | CRO | Deni Kaksa |
| 14 | DF | JPN | Chiharu Kato |
| 15 | MF | FIN | Joakim Ärilä |
| 16 | DF | CMR | Jules Samnda |
| 17 | DF | FIN | Sharp Räsänen |
| 18 | MF | FIN | Gullit Zolameso |
| 20 | DF | FIN | Johannes Kytilä |
| 23 | FW | FRA | Christopher Bibaku |
| 24 | MF | FIN | Hannes Seikkala |
| 80 | MF | FIN | Erfan Zeneli |
| — | DF | FIN | Oliver Kangaslahti |

== Management and boardroom ==
=== Management ===
As of 30 November 2020

| Name | Role |
|---|---|
| (Finland) Mika Lumijärvi | Director of Sport |
| (Serbia) Marko Milunović | Head Coach |
| (Finland) Katja Schroderus | Team Manager |
| (Finland) Mika Schroderus | Kit Manager |
| (Finland) Petteri Haikola | Physiotherapist |

=== Boardroom ===
As of 4 November 2020

| Name | Role |
|---|---|
| (Finland) Arvo Toivainen | Chairman |
| (Finland) Tommi Huttunen | Vice Chairman |
| (Finland) Nina Karinalainen | Treasurer |
| (Finland) Harri Partanen | Secretary |

== Records and statistics ==
Michael Nzekwe holds the record for most league appearances for AC Kajaani with 142 appearances between 2010 and 2015. During this time, Nzekwe also became the club's record goalscorer, with 100 goals. The club's record attendance was 1,172, which occurred on 21 April 2016 in a cup match against HJK.

The club's highest finish in the Finnish football pyramid was 8th in the Ykkönen, which occurred twice, in 2018 and 2019. The most goals AC Kajaani has scored in a season is 98, which occurred across 18 games in 2011 in the Kolmonen. The 2011 season also set records for most wins (17), fewest defeats (0), highest goal differential (+87), and highest points per game (2.89). The fewest goals allowed in one season is 10, in 2010. The 2013 season was the club's worst season, when they set records for most losses (19), fewest wins (3), fewest points (14), fewest goals scored (27), most goals allowed (66), worst goal differential (-39), and tied the club record for lowest table position (10th, also occurred in 2020). The most draws in one season was 11, which occurred in 2014.

The furthest the club ever got in the Suomen Cup was the sixth round, in 2016. The club's overall league record was 162 wins, 59 draws, and 99 losses, for a total of 545 points. They scored 774 league goals, and allowed 412 goals, for an overall goal differential of +362.
