= Petri Helin =

Finnish footballer (born 1969)

Personal information
- Date of birth: 13 December 1969 (age 56)
- Place of birth: Helsinki, Finland
- Height: 1.81 m (5 ft 11 1/2 in)
- Positions: Right midfielder; right-back

Senior career*
Years	Team	Apps	(Gls)
1988–1992	HJK	102	(10)
1988	→ PPT (loan)	12	(2)
1993–1996	Ikast	48	(3)
1996	HJK	12	(1)
1996–1997	Viborg	5	(0)
1997	HJK	10	(1)
1998	PK-35	27	(2)
1999–2000	Jokerit	59	(3)
2000–2001	Luton Town	23	(1)
2001–2002	Stockport County	13	(0)
2002	→ Denizlispor (loan)	4	(1)
2002–2003	Jokerit	27	(2)

International career
1988–1991	Finland U21	14	(4)
1992–2002	Finland	27	(2)
- * Club domestic league appearances and goals

Petri Helin (born 13 December 1969) is a Finnish former footballer. Helin played for several clubs in Finland, Denmark, England, and Turkey. He was capped 27 times for the Finland national team.

== Career statistics ==
As of 28 May 2024

Appearances and goals by club, season and competition
Club	Season	League			National cup (Note: Includes Suomen Cup, Danish Cup, FA Cup and Turkish Cup)		Other		Continental		Total	
Club	Season	Division	Apps	Goals	Apps	Goals	Apps	Goals	Apps	Goals	Apps	Goals
HJK	1988	Mestaruussarja										
HJK	1989	Mestaruussarja	18	0					1 (Note: Includes European Cup)	0	19	0
HJK	1990	Veikkausliiga	24	4	0	0	–		–		24	4
HJK	1991	Veikkausliiga	30	5	0	0	–		2	0	32	5
HJK	1992	Veikkausliiga	30	1	0	0	–		–		30	1
HJK	Total		102	10	0	0	0	0	3	0	105	10
PPT (loan)	1988	Mestaruussarja	12	2	–		–		–		12	2
Ikast	1993–94	Danish Superliga	28	3	–		–		–		28	3
Ikast	1994–95	Danish Superliga	18	0	–		–		1 (Note: Includes UEFA Intertoto Cup)	0	19	0
Ikast	1995–96	Danish Superliga	2	0	–		–		–		2	0
Ikast	Total		48	3	0	0	0	0	1	0	49	3
HJK	1996	Veikkausliiga	12	1	0	0	–		2 (Note: Includes UEFA Cup)	0	14	1
Viborg	1996–97	Danish Superliga	5	0	1	0	–		–		6	0
HJK	1997	Veikkausliiga	10	1	0	0	–		2 (Note: Includes UEFA Cup Winners' Cup)	1	12	2
PK-35	1998	Veikkausliiga	27	2	0	0	–		–		27	2
Jokerit	1999	Veikkausliiga	27	1	1	0	–		3	0	31	1
Jokerit	2000	Veikkausliiga	32	2	0	0	–		1	0	33	2
Jokerit	Total		59	3	1	0	0	0	4	0	64	3
Luton Town	2000–01	Second Division	23	1	1	0	0	0	–		24	1
Stockport County	2001–02	First Division	13	0	1	0	1 (Note: Includes EFL League Cup)	0	–		15	0
Denizlispor (loan)	2001–02	Süper Lig	4	1	1	0	–		–		5	1
Jokerit	2002	Ykkönen	8	0	–		–		–		8	0
Jokerit	2003	Veikkausliiga	12	1	–		–		–		12	1
Jokerit	Total		20	1	0	0	0	0	0	0	20	1
Career total			335	25	5	0	1	0	12	1	353	27

== Honours ==
- Finnish Championship: 1990, 1992, 1997

== Sources ==
- Veikkausliiga player statistics
