= Justus Kauppinen =

Finnish football player (born 1997)

Personal information
- Date of birth: 28 April 1997 (age 29)
- Place of birth: Mäntsälä, Finland
- Height: 5 ft 9 in (1.75 m)
- Position: Forward

Team information
- Current team: JäPS; Xavier Musketeers
- Number: 10

College career
Years	Team	Apps	(Gls)
2017–2019	Virginia Tech Hokies	33	(2)
2020–2022	Xavier Musketeers	23	(4)

Senior career*
Years	Team	Apps	(Gls)
2014–2016	Kuusysi	41	(4)
2015–2016	Lahti	2	(0)
2017	Kiffen	6	(1)
2018–2021	JäPS	30	(9)

International career
2012	Finland U15	3	(0)
2015	Finland U18	3	(0)
2015	Finland U19	3	(0)
- * Club domestic league appearances and goals as of 20:48, 27 March 2022 (UTC)

Justus Kauppinen (born 28 April 1997) is a Finnish footballer last played as a forward for the Xavier Musketeers as well as Ykkönen club JäPS.

== International career ==
Kauppinen has represented Finland at under-15, under-18 and under-19 level.
