= Berat Sadik =

Finnish footballer (born 1986)

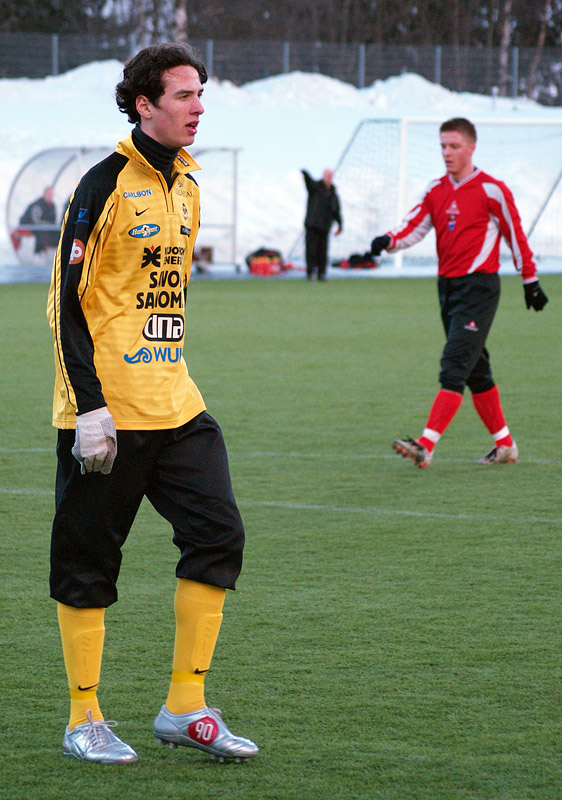
- Sadik training for KuPS in 2005

Personal information
- Date of birth: 14 September 1986 (age 40)
- Place of birth: Skopje, SFR Yugoslavia
- Height: 1.92 m (6 ft 4 in)
- Position: Striker

Team information
- Current team: Tikvesh
- Number: 9

Youth career
- 1992–2003: KiuPa

Senior career*
Years	Team	Apps	(Gls)
2004–2007	KuPS	26	(3)
2007–2008	Lahti	33	(13)
2008–2010	Arminia Bielefeld	13	(0)
2009–2010	→ Zulte Waregem (loan)	14	(1)
2010	Lahti	5	(2)
2011–2012	HJK	39	(20)
2013–2015	Thun	81	(21)
2015–2017	Krylia Sovetov	17	(0)
2017–2019	Doxa Katokopias	42	(30)
2019	Gimnàstic	11	(1)
2019–2020	Anorthosis	9	(0)
2020	Enosis Neon Paralimni	6	(2)
2020–2024	Doxa Katokopias	133	(42)
2025–	Tikvesh	35	(11)

International career^{‡}
2006–2009	Finland U21	8	(1)
2008–2018	Finland	13	(1)
- * Club domestic league appearances and goals as of 1 June 2026 ‡ National team caps and goals as of 20:07, 21 October 2015 (UTC)

Berat Sadik (Albanian: Berat Sadiku; born 14 September 1986) is a Finnish professional footballer who plays as a striker for Macedonian First League club Tikvesh.

== Early life ==
Sadik was born in Skopje, SR Macedonia, then still part of former Yugoslavia, on 14 September 1986 to Albanian parents and moved to Finland with his family at the age of three.

== Career ==
On 16 June 2008, it was published that Arminia Bielefeld was keen to sign him. Also Ascoli, Torino, AEL, Örebro and Rosenborg were interested to sign Sadik. After visiting Ascoli and Bielefeld he chose to sign a three-year contract with Arminia Bielefeld for a transfer fee of €400,000. In December 2007, he was on trial to Vicenza Calcio. After just one year, he left Arminia Bielefeld, where he played only thirteen games, and joined SV Zulte Waregem on loan for 10 months. He was released by Bielefeld in August 2010 and he rejoined the Veikkausliiga strugglers FC Lahti on 24 August 2010. He celebrated his comeback by scoring in his first appearance in a 1–1 draw against JJK.

On 31 January 2011, Sadik signed a two-year contract with HJK. He finished the season with 15 goals, being the club's second-best goalscorer, one goal behind Akseli Pelvas.

On 22 January 2019, Sadik signed an 18-month deal with Segunda División side Gimnàstic de Tarragona. On 5 August, after suffering relegation, he terminated his contract.

== International career ==
Sadik debuted for Finland national football team against Turkey on 29 May 2008.

== Personal life ==
His brothers Irfan and Burhan are also footballers.

== Career statistics ==
=== Club ===
As of 11 May 2024

Club	Season	League			Cup		Continental^{[A]}		Others^{[B]}		Total	
Club	Season	Division	Apps	Goals	Apps	Goals	Apps	Goals	Apps	Goals	Apps	Goals
KuPS	2005	Veikkausliiga	5	0	0	0	–	–	–	–	5	0
KuPS	2006	Veikkausliiga	21	3	0	0	–	–	–	–	21	3
KuPS	Total		26	3	0	0	0	0	0	0	26	3
Lahti	2007	Veikkausliiga	23	9	0	0	–	–	–	–	23	9
Lahti	2008	Veikkausliiga	10	4	0	0	–	–	–	–	10	4
Lahti	Total		33	13	0	0	0	0	0	0	33	13
Arminia Bielefeld	2008–09	Bundesliga	13	0	2	1	–	–	–	–	15	1
Arminia Bielefeld II	2008–09	NRW-Liga	3	1	–		–		–		3	1
Zulte Waregem (loan)	2009–10	Belgian First Division A	14	1	2	0	–	–	–	–	16	1
Lahti	2010	Veikkausliiga	5	2	0	0	–	–	–	–	5	2
HJK	2011	Veikkausliiga	27	15	3	1	6	3	0	0	30	16
HJK	2012	Veikkausliiga	12	5	0	0	4	1	5	3	23	11
HJK	Total		39	20	3	1	10	4	5	3	57	28
Thun	2012–13	Swiss Super League	18	2	1	0	–	–	–	–	19	2
Thun	2013–14	Swiss Super League	28	7	4	1	11	1	–	–	43	9
Thun	2014–15	Swiss Super League	35	12	3	0	–	–	–	–	38	12
Thun	Total		81	21	8	1	11	1	0	0	100	23
Krylia Sovetov	2015–16	Russian Premier League	11	0	1	0	–	–	–	–	12	0
Krylia Sovetov	2016–17	Russian Premier League	6	0	0	0	–	–	–	–	6	0
Krylia Sovetov	Total		17	0	1	0	0	0	0	0	18	0
Doxa Katokopias	2017–18	Cypriot First Division	30	18	2	2	–	–	–	–	32	20
Doxa Katokopias	2018–19	Cypriot First Division	12	12	0	0	–	–	–	–	12	12
Doxa Katokopias	Total		42	30	2	2	0	0	0	0	44	32
Gimnàstic	2018–19	Segunda División	11	1	–		–		–		11	1
Anorthosis Famagusta	2019–20	Cypriot First Division	9	0	1	0	–		–		10	0
Enosis Neon Paralimni	2019–20	Cypriot First Division	6	2	–		–		–		6	2
Doxa Katokopias	2020–21	Cypriot First Division	37	18	0	0	–		–		37	18
Doxa Katokopias	2021–22	Cypriot First Division	28	13	1	0	–		–		29	13
Doxa Katokopias	2022–23	Cypriot First Division	38	8	3	0	–		–		41	8
Doxa Katokopias	2023–24	Cypriot First Division	30	3	0	0	–		–		30	3
Doxa Katokopias	Total		133	42	4	0	0	0	0	0	137	42
Tikvesh	2024–25	Macedonian First League	0	0	0	0	–		–		0	0
Career total			431	133	22	5	21	5	5	3	479	146

=== International ===
As of 11 May 2024

Finland
Year	Apps	Goals
2008	2	0
2009	2	0
2010	0	0
2011	2	0
2012	1	0
2013	0	0
2014	1	0
2015	3	1
2016	0	0
2017	0	0
2018	2	0
Total	13	1

=== International goals ===
No.	Date	Venue	Opponent	Score	Result	Competition	Ref.
1.	29 March 2015	Windsor Park, Belfast, Northern Ireland	Northern Ireland	2–1	2–1	UEFA Euro 2016 qualifying	
