= Tuukka Andberg =

Finnish footballer (born 1998)

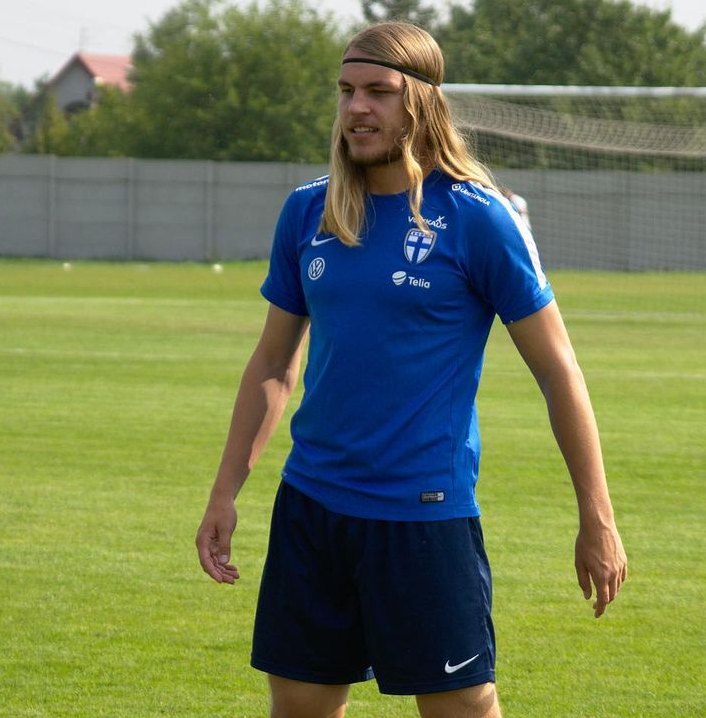
- Andberg with Finland U21 in 2020

Personal information
- Date of birth: 1 May 1998 (age 28)
- Place of birth: Finland
- Height: 1.82 m (6 ft 0 in)
- Position: Centre back

Team information
- Current team: PK-35
- Number: 34

Youth career
- –2016: PK-35

Senior career*
Years	Team	Apps	(Gls)
2015–2016	PK-35	7	(1)
2017–2020	HIFK	43	(1)
2017	→ HIFK II	8	(1)
2017	→ Gnistan (loan)	1	(0)
2021	Ekenäs IF	21	(1)
2022–2023	Gnistan	13	(0)
2023	→ NJS (loan)	1	(0)
2024–	PK-35	54	(1)

International career
- Finland U21
- * Club domestic league appearances and goals as of 18 October 2026

Tuukka Andberg (born 1 May 1998) is a Finnish professional footballer who plays as a centre back for Ykkösliiga club PK-35.
