= Kim Raimi =

Finnish football manager and a former player (born 1985)

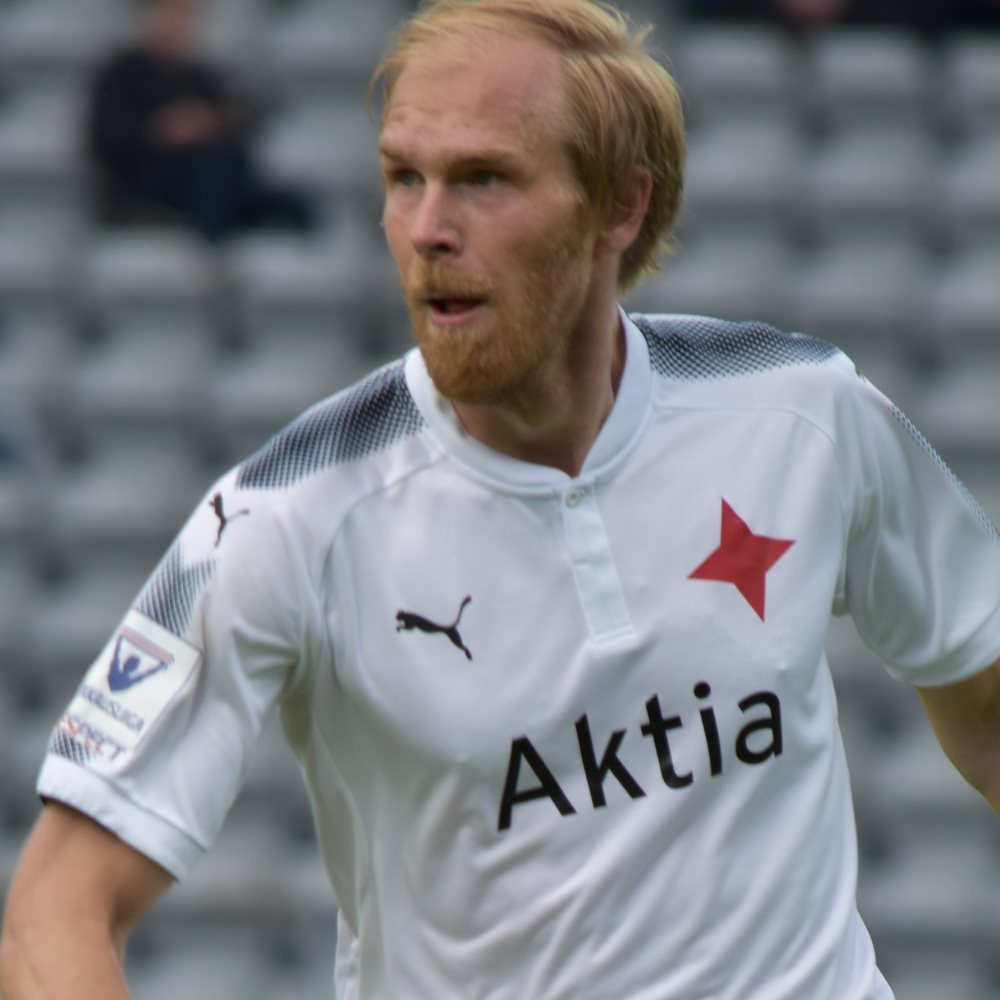
- Kim Raimi playing for HIFK in 2017

Personal information
- Date of birth: 25 February 1985 (age 41)
- Place of birth: Helsinki, Finland
- Height: 1.92 m (6 ft 4 in)
- Position: Centre back

Youth career
- 1990–1999: KäPa
- 2000: HIFK
- 2001–2002: PK-35

Senior career*
Years	Team	Apps	(Gls)
2003–2006	PK-35	70	(4)
2007–2008	Viikingit	10	(0)
2009–2016	PK-35 Vantaa	124	(10)
2017	HIFK	15	(0)
2018	PK-35	6	(2)

International career
2003	Finland U18	2	(0)

Managerial career
- 2017–2020: PK-35 (assistant)
- 2021–2024: PK-35
- * Club domestic league appearances and goals as of 28 February 2024

Kim Raimi (born 25 February 1985) is a Finnish football manager and a former player. He was most recently the manager of PK-35 in Ykkösliiga, having previously worked for the team as an assistant coach. During his playing career, he played mainly as a centre back for Helsinki-based clubs, and captained PK-35 Vantaa until the club's bankruptcy at the end of 2016.

== Early career ==
Born in Helsinki, Raimi played in the youth sectors of local clubs Käpylän Pallo (KäPa) during 1990–1999, HIFK in 2000 and PK-35 during 2001–02.

== Club career ==
=== PK-35 ===
He started his senior career with his former youth team PK-35 in 2003, when the club competed in the third-tier Kakkonen. For the 2005 season, PK were promoted to the second-tier Ykkönen and Raimi stayed with the team.

=== Viikingit ===
On 20 December 2006, he signed with newly promoted FC Viikingit in the first-tier Veikkausliiga, but due to injury he made only seven appearances in the league during the 2007 season. After the relegation, he stayed with Viikingit in Ykkönen.

=== PK-35 Vantaa ===
In 2009, Raimi joined new Ykkönen club PK-35 Vantaa, the new first team of his former club PK-35, which detached and relocated to Myyrmäki, Vantaa. Raimi established himself in the division becoming an integral part of the team's defense, but despite rumours he did not join any Veikkausliiga club. He was also named the team captain. Eventually PK-35 Vantaa won a promotion to Veikkausliiga for the 2016 season, with the head coach Shefki Kuqi. At the end of the season after financial problems, the club were relegated and ultimately declared for bankruptcy. Raimi had terminated his contract with the club in September 2016. Prior to his departure, Raimi had made 128 total appearances for PK-35 Vantaa, scoring 10 goals.

=== HIFK ===
For the 2017 season, Raimi signed with Veikkausliiga club HIFK under the head coach Antti Muurinen.

=== Return to PK-35 ===
Raimi ended his playing career in 2018 in the fourth-tier Kolmonen with his former team PK-35. The club had continued operations in Pihlajamäki, Helsinki, after the dissolvement of the breakaway team in Vantaa, and gained the division spot of their former reserve team. He worked simultaneously as the team's assistant coach.

== Coaching career ==
=== PK-35 ===
Before retiring as a player, Raimi had already started to work as an assistant coach of PK-35. Since the start of the 2021 Ykkönen season, he is the manager of the club's first team. Raimi led PK-35 to win a promotion to the new second-tier Ykkösliiga for the inaugural 2024 season, after winning the promotion play-offs in the late 2023. On 2 June 2024, PK-35 announced the termination of Raimi's contract due to poor results in the ongoing season. Raimi continues working as a youth coach in the club.

== Career statistics ==
As of 14 May 2024

Appearances and goals by club, season and competition
Club	Season	League			Cup (Note: Includes Suomen Cup)		League Cup (Note: Includes Finnish League Cup)		Total	
Club	Season	Division	Apps	Goals	Apps	Goals	Apps	Goals	Apps	Goals
PK-35	2003	Kakkonen								
PK-35	2004	Kakkonen								
PK-35	2005	Ykkönen								
PK-35	2006	Ykkönen								
PK-35	Total		70	4	0	0	0	0	70	4
Viikingit	2007	Veikkausliiga	7	0	–		–		7	0
Viikingit	2008	Ykkönen	3	0	–		–		3	0
Viikingit	Total		10	0	0	0	0	0	10	0
PK-35 Vantaa	2009	Ykkönen	9	0	–		–		9	0
PK-35 Vantaa	2010	Ykkönen	12	1	–		–		12	1
PK-35 Vantaa	2011	Ykkönen	21	1	–		–		21	1
PK-35 Vantaa	2012	Ykkönen	13	5	–		–		13	5
PK-35 Vantaa	2013	Ykkönen	21	1	1	0	–		22	1
PK-35 Vantaa	2014	Ykkönen	21	1	–		–		21	1
PK-35 Vantaa	2015	Ykkönen	19	0	–		–		19	0
PK-35 Vantaa	2016	Veikkausliiga	10	1	1	0	2	0	13	1
PK-35 Vantaa	Total		124	10	2	0	2	0	128	10
HIFK	2017	Veikkausliiga	15	0	1	0	–		16	0
PK-35	2018	Kolmonen	6	2	–		–		6	2
Career total			225	16	3	0	2	0	230	16

== Managerial statistics ==
As of 2 June 2024

Team	Nat	From	To	Record							
Team	Nat	From	To	P	W	D	L	GF	GA	GD	W%
PK-35	(Finland)	1 January 2021	2 June 2024	110	50	25	35	190	165	+25	45.45
Total				110	50	25	35	190	165	+25	45.45
