= Henrik Åhnstrand =

Swedish football manager

Personal information
- Date of birth: 29 July 1979 (age 47)
- Place of birth: Nyköping, Sweden

Team information
- Current team: IK Sirius (assistant)

Youth career
- 1988–1995: Söderhamns FF

Senior career*
Years	Team	Apps	(Gls)
1995–2000	GIF Sundsvall		
2000–2002	Söderhamns FF	6	(0)

Managerial career
- 2010–2012: Söderhamns FF
- 2013–2017: Hudiksvalls FF
- 2018–2019: GIF Sundsvall (assistant)
- 2020–2022: GIF Sundsvall
- 2023–: IK Sirius (assistant)
- * Club domestic league appearances and goals

Henrik Åhnstrand (born 29 July 1979) is a Swedish professional football manager who is assistant manager for Allsvenskan club IK Sirius.

== Playing career ==
As a player, Åhnstrand was a member of GIF Sundsvall and Söderhamns FF. He made six appearances in two years for Söderhamns FF. Later he suffered an injury that forced him to retire.

== Managerial career ==
After retiring as a player for Söderhamns FF, Åhnstrand took up coaching and became head coach of the club in 2010. He would afterwards manage Hudiksvalls FF for several years. While coaching the club, in November 2015, he was admitted to the UEFA Pro Licence programme.

Åhnstrand was appointed assistant coach at his former club GIF Sundsvall in November 2017, a position he shared with Ferran Sibila. After long-time manager Joel Cedergren was dismissed in August 2019 due to disappointing results, and his successor Tony Gustavsson failed to turn the tide, Åhnstrand was promoted to the position as manager in December 2019. Director of football at the club, Urban Hagblom stated to the club website upon the hiring of Åhnstrand that "we work with the development of talent in Norrland, but not just players. Henrik Åhnstrand is a clear proof of our talent development even with coaches in the region".

Åhnstrand was sacked on 28 July 2022, as GIF Sundsvall were second to bottom in the league with 10 points in 15 games.

On 19 December 2022, Åhnstrand joined IK Sirius to become assistant coach to newly appointed head coach Christer Mattiasson.

== Personal life ==
Åhnstrand lives in Söderhamn with his wife and two children.

== Managerial statistics ==
As of 27 September 2022

Managerial record by team and tenure
Team	From	To	Record				
Team	From	To	P	W	D	L	Win %
GIF Sundsvall	12 December 2019	28 July 2022	83	30	18	35	36.1
Total			83	30	18	35	36.1
