= Tomi Kult =

Finnish footballer (born 2000)

Personal information
- Date of birth: 4 July 2000 (age 26)
- Place of birth: Lieto, Finland
- Height: 1.80 m (5 ft 11 in)
- Position: Striker

Youth career
- FC Kuusysi

Senior career*
| Years | Team | Apps | (Gls) |
| 2017 | FC Kuusysi | 8 | (1) |
| 2018–2019 | FC Lahti | 11 | (1) |
| 2018 | → PKKU (loan) | 1 | (0) |
| 2019 | → Reipas (loan) | 8 | (7) |
| 2020–2021 | Kajaani | 9 | (0) |
| 2021–2022 | Reipas | 25 | (8) |
- * Club domestic league appearances and goals as of 15:47, 1 June 2024 (UTC)

Tomi Kult (born 4 July 2000) is a Finnish professional footballer who plays as a striker.
