= Irfan Sadik =

Finnish footballer (born 1999)

Personal information
- Date of birth: 12 January 1999 (age 27)
- Place of birth: Kiuruvesi, Finland
- Height: 1.90 m (6 ft 3 in)
- Position: Striker

Team information
- Current team: PK-35
- Number: 9

Youth career
- KuPS
- Kuusysi

Senior career*
Years	Team	Apps	(Gls)
2016–2017	Kuusysi	30	(8)
2017–2019	Lahti	12	(0)
2018	→ PK Keski-Uusimaa (loan)	5	(1)
2019	→ Reipas Lahti	8	(9)
2020	MP	7	(1)
2021	Onisilos Sotira		
2022	PEPO	24	(10)
2023	Lahti	22	(0)
2024	JäPS	15	(8)
2024–2026	Belasitsa Petrich	43	(8)
2026–	PK-35	24	(8)
- * Club domestic league appearances and goals as of 18 October 2026

Irfan Sadik (born 12 January 1999) is a Finnish professional footballer who plays for Ykkösliiga club PK-35 as a striker.

== Club career ==
On 13 January 2020, Sadik moved to Ykkönen club Mikkelin Palloilijat on a deal until the end of 2020.

On 31 January 2023, Sadik returned to Lahti on a one-year deal.

On 21 July 2024, Sadik moved to Bulgaria and joined Belasitsa Petrich in the Bulgarian Second League.

== Personal life ==
Sadik's two older brothers, Berat and Burhan, are also footballers; the family are of Macedonian Albanian descent. He is a Muslim and fasts during Ramadan.

== Career statistics ==
As of 8 June 2025

Appearances and goals by club, season and competition
Club	Season	Division	League		Cup (Note: Includes Suomen Cup and Bulgarian Cup)		League cup (Note: Includes Finnish League Cup, Ykkönen Cup and Ykkösliigacup)		Other		Total	
Club	Season	Division	Apps	Goals	Apps	Goals	Apps	Goals	Apps	Goals	Apps	Goals
Kuusysi	2016	Kakkonen	9	1	–		–		–		9	1
Kuusysi	2017	Kakkonen	21	7	–		–		–		21	7
Kuusysi	Total		30	8	0	0	0	0	0	0	30	8
Lahti	2017	Veikkausliiga	1	0	4	0	–		–		5	0
Lahti	2018	Veikkausliiga	10	0	2	0	–		–		12	0
Lahti	2019	Veikkausliiga	1	0	5	1	–		–		6	1
Lahti	Total		12	0	11	1	0	0	0	0	23	1
PKKU (loan)	2018	Kakkonen	3	0	–		–		–		3	0
Reipas Lahti	2019	Kakkonen	8	9	–		–		–		8	9
MP	2020	Ykkönen	7	1	5	4	–		–		12	5
Onisilos Sotira	2020–21	Cypriot Second Division					–		–			
PEPO	2022	Ykkönen	24	10	2	2	2	0	–		28	12
Lahti	2023	Veikkausliiga	22	0	3	0	5	3	–		30	3
Reipas Lahti	2023	Kakkonen	1	0	–		–		–		1	0
JäPS	2024	Ykkösliiga	15	8	2	0	5	2	–		22	10
Belasitsa Petrich	2024–25	Bulgarian Second League	34	8	1	0	–		–		35	8
Career total			156	43	24	7	12	5	0	0	192	56
