= Ayuub Ahmed-Nur =

Somalian footballer (born 2002)

Personal information
- Date of birth: 2 June 2002 (age 24)
- Place of birth: Helsinki, Finland
- Position: Right winger

Team information
- Current team: PK-35
- Number: 27

Youth career
- –2018: HJK
- 2019–2020: PK–35

Senior career*
Years	Team	Apps	(Gls)
2021–2022	VJS	33	(1)
2023–2024	EPS	36	(13)
2024	→ PK-35 (loan)	8	(1)
2025	PK-35	24	(8)
2026	Sevlievo	13	(0)
2026–	PK-35	13	(2)

International career
2025–	Somalia	2	(0)
- * Club domestic league appearances and goals as of 18 October 2026

Ayuub Ahmed-Nur (born 2 June 2002) is a professional footballer who plays as a right winger for PK-35. Born in Finland, Ahmed-Nur represents the Somalia national team.

== Club career ==
Ahmed-Nur played in the youth sectors of HJK Helsinki and PK-35.

At senior level, he has played for Vantaan Jalkapalloseura, Espoon Palloseura and PK-35.

In early 2026, he moved to Bulgaria and signed with Sevlievo.

== International career ==
Ahmed-Nur made his full international debut for the Somalia national team on 5 September 2025, in a 2026 FIFA World Cup qualification match against Guinea.

== Personal life ==
Born in Helsinki, Finland, Ahmed-Nur is of Somali descent.
