= Otto Salmensuu =

Finnish footballer (born 2004)

Personal information
- Full name: Otto Veikko Viljami Salmensuu
- Date of birth: 9 February 2004 (age 22)
- Place of birth: Helsinki, Finland
- Height: 1.73 m (5 ft 8 in)
- Position: Winger

Team information
- Current team: PK-35
- Number: 10

Youth career
- PK-35
- Reipas Lahti
- Lahti

Senior career*
Years	Team	Apps	(Gls)
2022–2023	SalPa	11	(0)
2023	→ Pallo-Iirot (loan)	13	(5)
2024–2025	AC Oulu	19	(0)
2024–2025	→ OLS	12	(3)
2026–	PK-35	11	(1)
- * Club domestic league appearances and goals as of 18 October 2026

Otto Veikko Viljami Salmensuu (born 9 February 2004) is a Finnish professional footballer who plays as a right winger for Ykkösliiga side PK-35.

== Early career ==
Born in Helsinki and raised in Viikki, Salmensuu started football in a youth team of PK-35, before moving to Lahti when aged six, and joining Reipas Lahti youth sector.

== Club career ==
After playing in the youth sectors of Reipas Lahti and FC Lahti in his hometown Lahti, Finland, Salmensuu signed with Salon Palloilijat (SalPa) in second tier Ykkönen in August 2022. He was loaned out to third-tier Kakkonen club Pallo-Iirot in July 2023 for the rest of the season.

On 22 November 2023, Salmensuu signed with Veikkausliiga club AC Oulu on a two-year deal with an option for one more. He made his league debut with AC Oulu on 6 April 2024, in the opening match of the 2024 season against SJK.

== Career statistics ==
As of 26 February 2025

Appearances and goals by club, season and competition
Club	Season	League			Cup (Note: Includes Suomen Cup)		League cup (Note: Includes Ykköscup and Finnish League Cup)		Europe		Total	
Club	Season	Division	Apps	Goals	Apps	Goals	Apps	Goals	Apps	Goals	Apps	Goals
SalPa	2022	Kakkonen	8	0	–		–		–		8	0
SalPa	2023	Ykkönen	3	0	2	0	1	0	–		6	0
SalPa	Total		11	0	2	0	1	0	0	0	14	0
SalPa II	2023	Nelonen	1	0	–		–		–		1	0
Pallo-Iirot (loan)	2023	Kakkonen	13	5	–		–		–		13	5
AC Oulu	2024	Veikkausliiga	11	0	5	1	4	0	–		20	1
AC Oulu	2025	Veikkausliiga	0	0	0	0	5	0	–		5	0
AC Oulu	Total		11	0	5	1	9	0	0	0	25	1
OLS	2024	Ykkönen	11	3	–		–		–		11	3
Career total			47	8	7	1	10	0	0	0	64	9
