= Linus Rönnberg =

Finnish footballer (born 2003)

Personal information
- Date of birth: 13 January 2003 (age 23)
- Place of birth: Finland
- Height: 1.77 m (5 ft 10 in)
- Position: Winger

Team information
- Current team: Aarhus Fremad
- Number: 14

Youth career
- Inter Turku

Senior career*
| Years | Team | Apps | (Gls) |
| 2020 | Inter Turku II | 6 | (1) |
| 2021 | Ilves II | 11 | (6) |
| 2021–2022 | Ilves | 4 | (0) |
| 2022–2023 | TPS | 42 | (7) |
| 2024 | JäPS | 12 | (1) |
| 2024–2025 | Podbeskidzie | 33 | (6) |
| 2025–2026 | Zagłębie Sosnowiec | 24 | (2) |
| 2026– | Aarhus Fremad | 4 | (0) |

International career
| 2018–2019 | Finland U16 | 4 | (0) |
| 2020 | Finland U17 | 2 | (0) |
- * Club domestic league appearances and goals as of 3 September 2026

Linus Rönnberg (born 13 January 2003) is a Finnish professional footballer who plays as a winger for Danish 1st Division side Aarhus Fremad.

== Club career ==
Rönnberg played in his native Finland for Inter Turku, Ilves, Turun Palloseura (TPS) and Järvenpään Palloseura (JäPS). He played mostly in the second-tiers Ykkönen and Ykkösliiga, third-tier Kakkonen and fourth-tier Kolmonen, and made four appearances for Ilves in Veikkausliiga in 2021.

On 10 July 2024, Rönnberg moved to Poland and signed with II liga club Podbeskidzie Bielsko-Biała, starting from the 2024–25 season. He debuted with his new team in the league on 21 July 2024, in a 0–0 draw against Olimpia Elbląg, being named the Player of the Game per voting by the supporters. Rönnberg left Podbeskidzie at the end of the 2024–25 season after deciding not to extend his contract.

On 15 July 2025, Rönnberg signed with Zagłębie Sosnowiec on a two-year deal. On 18 June 2026, after Zagłębie's relegation to the III liga, Rönnberg's contract was terminated.

On 29 July 2026, Rönnberg signed with Danish 1st Division club Aarhus Fremad.

== International career ==
Rönnberg has represented Finland at under-16 and under-17 youth international levels.

== Career statistics ==
As of 3 September 2026

Appearances and goals by club, season and competition
| Club | Season | League | | | National cup (Note: Includes Suomen Cup, Polish Cup, Danish Cup) | | League cup (Note: Includes Finnish League Cup and Ykköscup) | | Total | |
| Club | Season | Division | Apps | Goals | Apps | Goals | Apps | Goals | Apps | Goals |
|---|---|---|---|---|---|---|---|---|---|---|
| Inter Turku II | 2020 | Kolmonen | 6 | 1 | — | | — | | 6 | 1 |
| Ilves II | 2021 | Kakkonen | 11 | 6 | — | | — | | 11 | 6 |
| Ilves | 2021 | Veikkausliiga | 4 | 0 | 1 | 0 | — | | 5 | 0 |
| Ilves | 2022 | Veikkausliiga | 0 | 0 | 0 | 0 | 1 | 0 | 1 | 0 |
| Ilves | Total | | 4 | 0 | 1 | 0 | 1 | 0 | 6 | 0 |
| TPS | 2022 | Ykkönen | 22 | 5 | 2 | 0 | — | | 24 | 5 |
| TPS | 2023 | Ykkönen | 20 | 2 | 1 | 0 | 1 | 0 | 22 | 2 |
| TPS | Total | | 42 | 7 | 3 | 0 | 1 | 0 | 46 | 7 |
| TPS U23 | 2023 | Kolmonen | 3 | 0 | — | | — | | 3 | 0 |
| JäPS | 2024 | Ykkösliiga | 12 | 1 | 2 | 0 | 0 | 0 | 14 | 1 |
| Podbeskidzie Bielsko-Biała | 2024–25 | II liga | 33 | 6 | 2 | 0 | — | | 35 | 6 |
| Zagłębie Sosnowiec | 2025–26 | II liga | 24 | 2 | 1 | 0 | — | | 25 | 2 |
| Aarhus Fremad | 2026–27 | Danish 1st Division | 4 | 0 | 2 | 0 | — | | 6 | 0 |
| Career total | | | 139 | 23 | 11 | 0 | 2 | 0 | 152 | 23 |

== Honours ==
TPS

- Ykkönen runner-up: 2022
