= Esa Terävä =

Finnish footballer (born 1987)

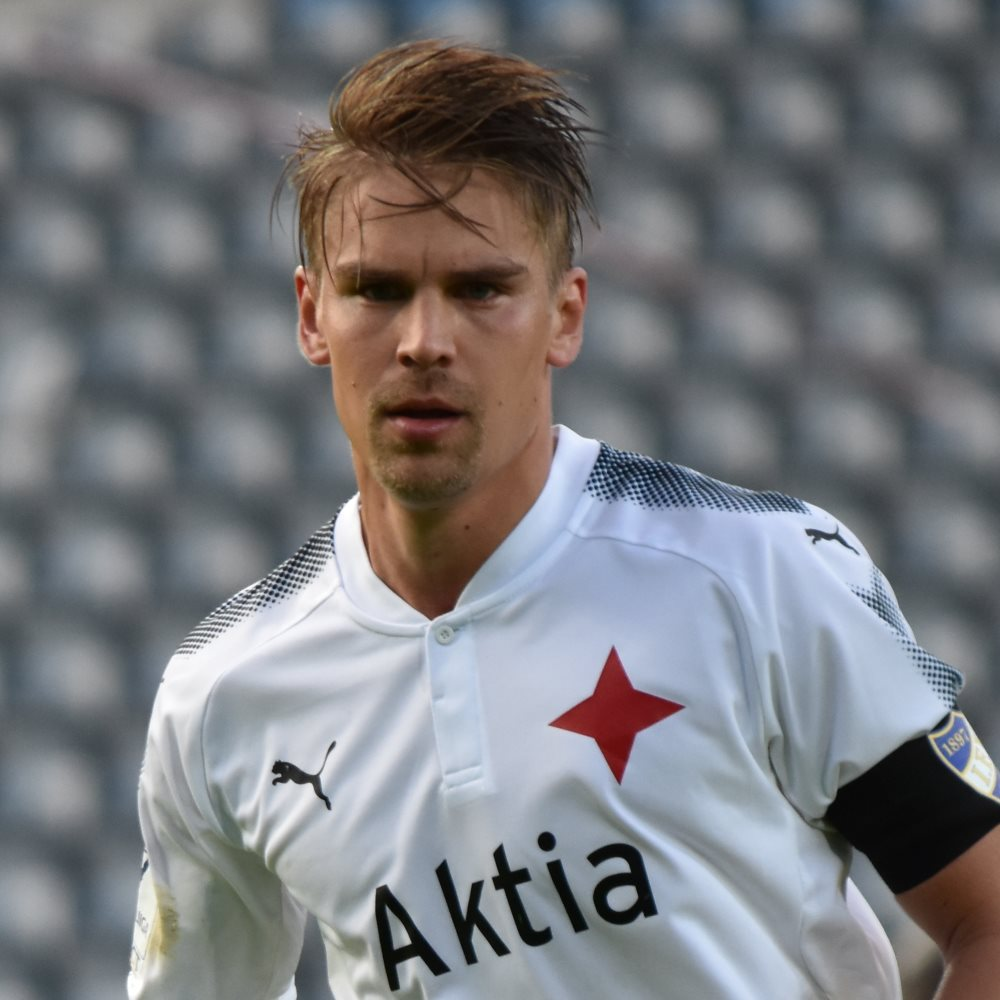
- Terävä with HIFK in 2017

Personal information
- Date of birth: 8 November 1987 (age 39)
- Place of birth: Helsinki, Finland
- Height: 1.82 m (6 ft 0 in)
- Position: Attacking midfielder

Youth career
- 1998–2006: PK-35

Senior career*
Years	Team	Apps	(Gls)
2004–2007	PK-35	5	(0)
2008	HIFK	26	(9)
2009	Atlantis	8	(0)
2009–2012	PK-35 Vantaa	75	(15)
2013–2018	HIFK	141	(27)
2015	→ Gnistan (loan)	2	(0)
2019–2022	PK-35	85	(9)
Total		342	(60)
- * Club domestic league appearances and goals as of 18 August 2024

Esa Terävä (born 8 November 1987) is a Finnish former professional footballer, who last captained PK-35.

He is a former youth player of PK-35 of Vantaa. He made his debut in the first team of PK-35, in the season of 2004. During that season and the two following seasons, he had only a few appearances. In 2008, he represented HIFK in Kakkonen, the third level of Finnish football. In January 2009 he moved to Atlantis FC, who played in Ykkönen for the time being. Terävä had eight appearances in Atlantis before transferring back to PK-35 in July, who played in the same division. Terävä played four seasons for PK-35.

After his spell in PK-35, he moved back to HIFK in January 2013 who played in Kakkonen. On his first season in HIFK were promoted back to Ykkönen. During the season of 2014 in Ykkönen, Terävä was in key role when HIFK won the promotion fight in their last match and got promoted to Veikkausliiga. In late 2014 he made a year long contract with HIFK. He made his debut in Veikkausliiga in April 2015 against IFK Mariehamn. He also scored his first goal in Veikkausliiga in that particular match.

== Personal life ==
In addition to playing football, Terävä studiet teaching in University of Helsinki.

In May 2025 Terävä became a vice principal in Merilahti Comprehensive School. (Formerly known as Kallahti Comprehensive school and Meri-Rastila Comprehensive school. The schools combined and made ”merilahti” in 1.8.2017.)
