= Sharp Räsänen =

Finnish footballer

Personal information
- Date of birth: 2 January 1999 (age 27)
- Place of birth: London, England
- Position: Defender

Team information
- Current team: KuPS

Senior career*
Years	Team	Apps	(Gls)
2015–	KuPS	2	(0)
2017	→ KuFu-98 (loan)	5	(0)
2017	→ AC Oulu (loan)	9	(0)
2018	→ KuFu-98 (loan)	5	(2)
- * Club domestic league appearances and goals as of 13:32, 6 June 2018 (UTC)

Sharp Räsänen (born 17 February 1999) is a Finnish professional footballer who plays for KuPS, as a defender.

Räsänen was born in London, England, to a Nigerian mother and a Finnish father, and he was raised in Sweden and Finland. He is a dual citizen of the United Kingdom and Finland.

In 2026, Räsänen appeared on the sixth season of Love Island Suomi, the Finnish version of the dating reality show Love Island.
