= Erol Ates =

Finnish-Turkish football manager (born 1993)

Personal information
- Date of birth: 19 June 1993 (age 33)
- Place of birth: Konya, Turkey
- Position: Midfielder

Youth career
- –2011: Inter Turku
- 2011–2012: TuTo
- 2012–2013: TPS

Senior career*
Years	Team	Apps	(Gls)
- VG-62
- PIF
- ÅIFK
- Raisio Futis

Managerial career
- 2019–2020: Inter Turku II
- 2021–2022: Inter Turku (assistant)
- 2024: JäPS
- 2024–2026: GIF Sundsvall
- * Club domestic league appearances and goals as of 12 July 2024

Erol Ates (born 19 June 1993) is a Finnish-Turkish football manager and a former player. Ates has completed the UEFA Pro coaching license in 2022.

== Early life ==
Ates was born in Konya, Turkey. He was raised in Turkey until 2007, when his family relocated to Finland when he was 13 years old. They settled in Turku, where Ates started playing football in the youth sector of FC Inter Turku.

== Playing career ==
Ates played in youth teams of Inter Turku, Turun Toverit and Turun Palloseura. He played also for VG-62, Pargas IF, Piikkiön Palloseura and Åbo IFK before switching to coaching.

== Coaching career ==
Ates has worked as a youth coach for TPS, Vaasan Palloseura and ÅIFK.

=== Inter Turku ===
He returned to his former club Inter Turku as a youth coach in 2018. Since the beginning of 2019, he worked as a head coach of Inter Turku II academy team in the fourth-tier Kolmonen. During 2021–2022, Ates was an assistant coach of Inter Turku first team in Veikkausliiga. He left the club after the 2022 season.

=== JäPS ===
On 13 June 2023, after Jyrki Ahola had stepped down due to personal health reasons, it was announced that Ates was named the head coach of Järvenpään Palloseura on a two-year deal, starting in the 2024 season in new second-tier Ykkösliiga. It was also announced that first Ates will work for JäPS as a technical advisor for the remainder of the 2023 season.

Since 2023, Ates has also worked for Naantali-based VG-62 for the coaching development in the club.

=== GIF Sundsvall ===
On 12 July 2024, Ates was named the head coach of GIF Sundsvall in Swedish Superettan, signing a two-and-a-half-year contract with the club. The team were sitting close to relegation zone in the league standings. Ates managed to improve the team's performance and get some positive results, and led them to finish 13th in Superettan. In late November, Sundsvall successfully defended its league spot in the relegation play-offs, defeating Stockholm Internazionale 4–2 on aggregate.

== Managerial statistics ==
As of 16 May 2026

Team	Nat	From	To	Record							
Team	Nat	From	To	P	W	D	L	GF	GA	GD	W%
Inter Turku II	(Finland)	1 January 2019	31 December 2020	38	25	6	7	98	39	+59	65.79
JäPS	(Finland)	1 January 2024	11 July 2024	22	6	7	9	36	43	−7	27.27
GIF Sundsvall	(Sweden)	12 July 2024	16 May 2026	60	22	12	26	67	79	−12	36.67
Total				120	53	25	42	201	160	+41	44.17
