= GIF Sundsvall =

Swedish football club

- Full name: Gymnastik- och Idrottsföreningen Sundsvall
- Nicknames: Giffarna; Norrlandslaget (Northland Team)
- Short name: GIF
- Founded: 25 August 1903; 123 years ago
- Ground: NP3 Arena, Sundsvall
- Capacity: 8,000
- Head coach: Per Joar Hansen
- League: Superettan
- 2025: Superettan, 11th of 16
- Website: www.gifsundsvall.se
Home colours	Away colours

Gymnastik- och Idrottsföreningen Sundsvall, more commonly known as GIF Sundsvall (Swedish pronunciation: [ˈɡɪfː ˈsɵ̂nː(d)sval]), Giffarna or simply Sundsvall, is a Swedish professional football club based in Sundsvall. The club is affiliated with Medelpads Fotbollförbund and plays its home games at NP3 Arena with a capacity of roughly 8,000 spectators. Formed on 25 August 1903, the club has played 19 seasons in Sweden's highest football league Allsvenskan, the club's first season in the league was in 1965.

GIF Sundsvall is placed twenty-second in the overall Allsvenskan table maratontabellen. The club colours, reflected in their crest and kit, are blue, yellow and white. Nevertheless, white is not articulately present in today's kit it has a strong history within the club.

== History ==
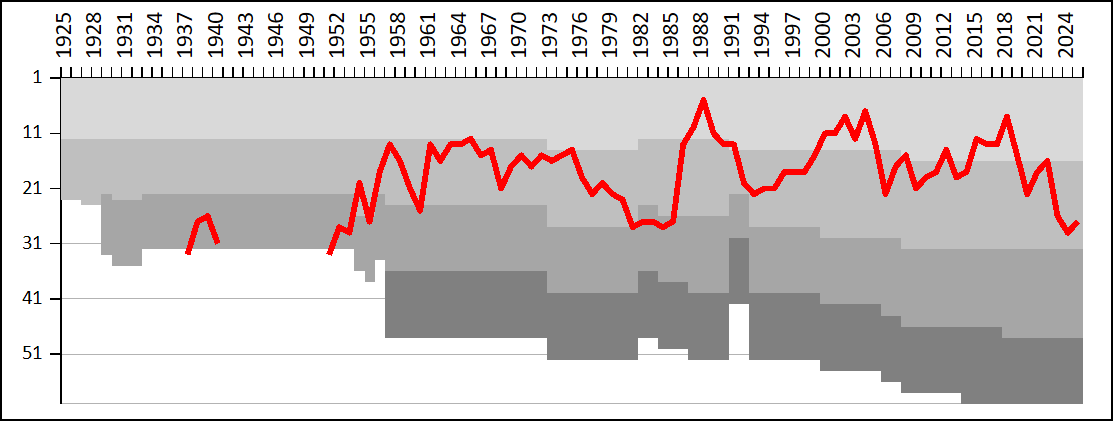
A chart showing the progress of GIF Sundsvall through the swedish football league system. The different shades of gray represent league divisions.

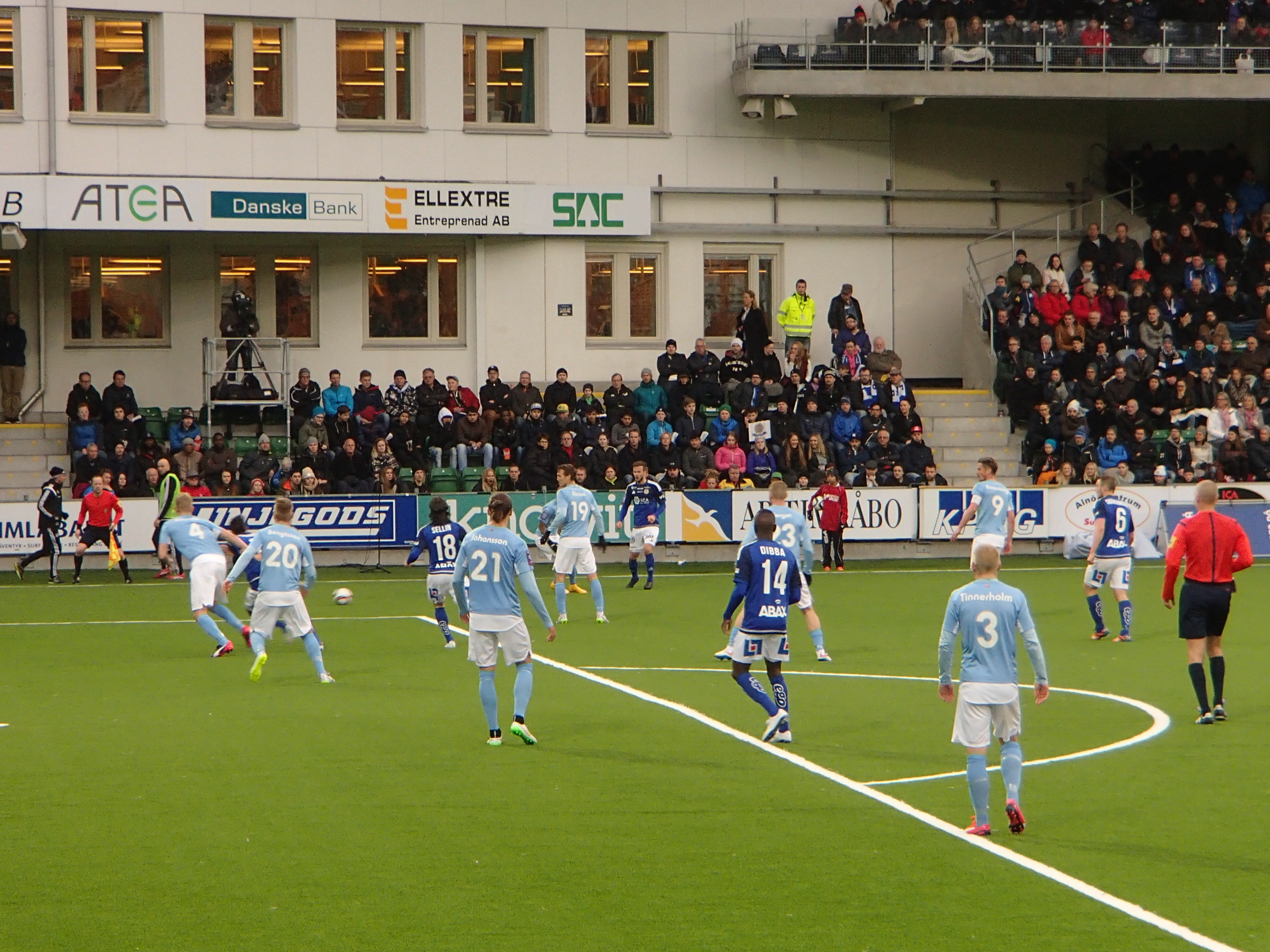
GIF Sundsvall in their traditional blue and white kits during an Allsvenskan game against Malmö FF.

The club was formed on August 25, 1903, at Matilda Anderssons Café. At that time, GIF Sundsvall stood for "Godtemplarnas Idrotts Förening Sundsvall" which mainly was for Teetotallers up until the alcohol demands was lightened in 1920. The initials then came to stand for, to this day still, "Gymnastik och Idrottsföreningen Sundsvall" (Gymnastics and sports club Sundsvall).

The club reached the first tier of the domestic football in 1965. The club has since been a "yo-yo team" mainly playing in the second division but with Allsvenskan stints in 1975, 1987–89, 1991, 2000–06, 2008, 2012 and 2015–19.

GIF Sundsvall earlier had women's football, bandy and ice hockey on the program. The bandy team became district champions for Västernorrland in 1921. The hockey team folded in the late 1960s. In 1985 the women's team was transferred to Sundsvalls DFF. This mainly because the women's team was disappointed with the lack of support from the men's team.

== Stadium ==
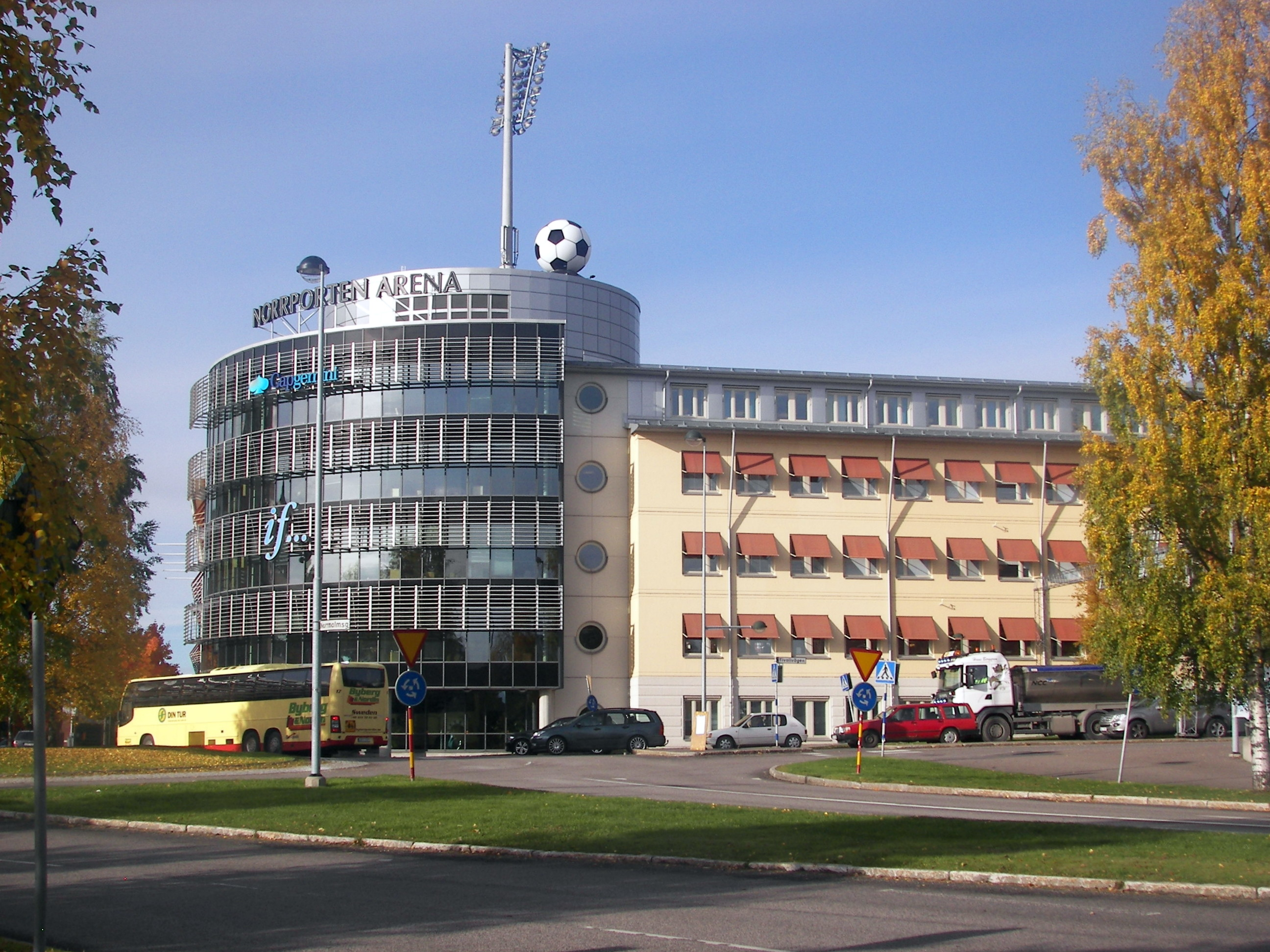
Exterior of Idrottsparken, earlier known as Norrporten Arena.

GIF Sundsvall's home stadium is NP3 Arena, formerly known as Idrottsparken and Norrporten Arena. It is located in the heart of Sundsvall and was inaugurated on August 6, 1903. It was renovated in 2001–2002 and it can now hold a capacity of 8,000, with 5,000 under roof.

Between 2006 – 2016 the name was changed to Norrporten Arena and during 2017 the club expect to present a new sponsor and name of the stadium. The stadium's grass is artificial turf since 2004.

The record attendance was 16,507 against Högadals IS on October 15, 1961.

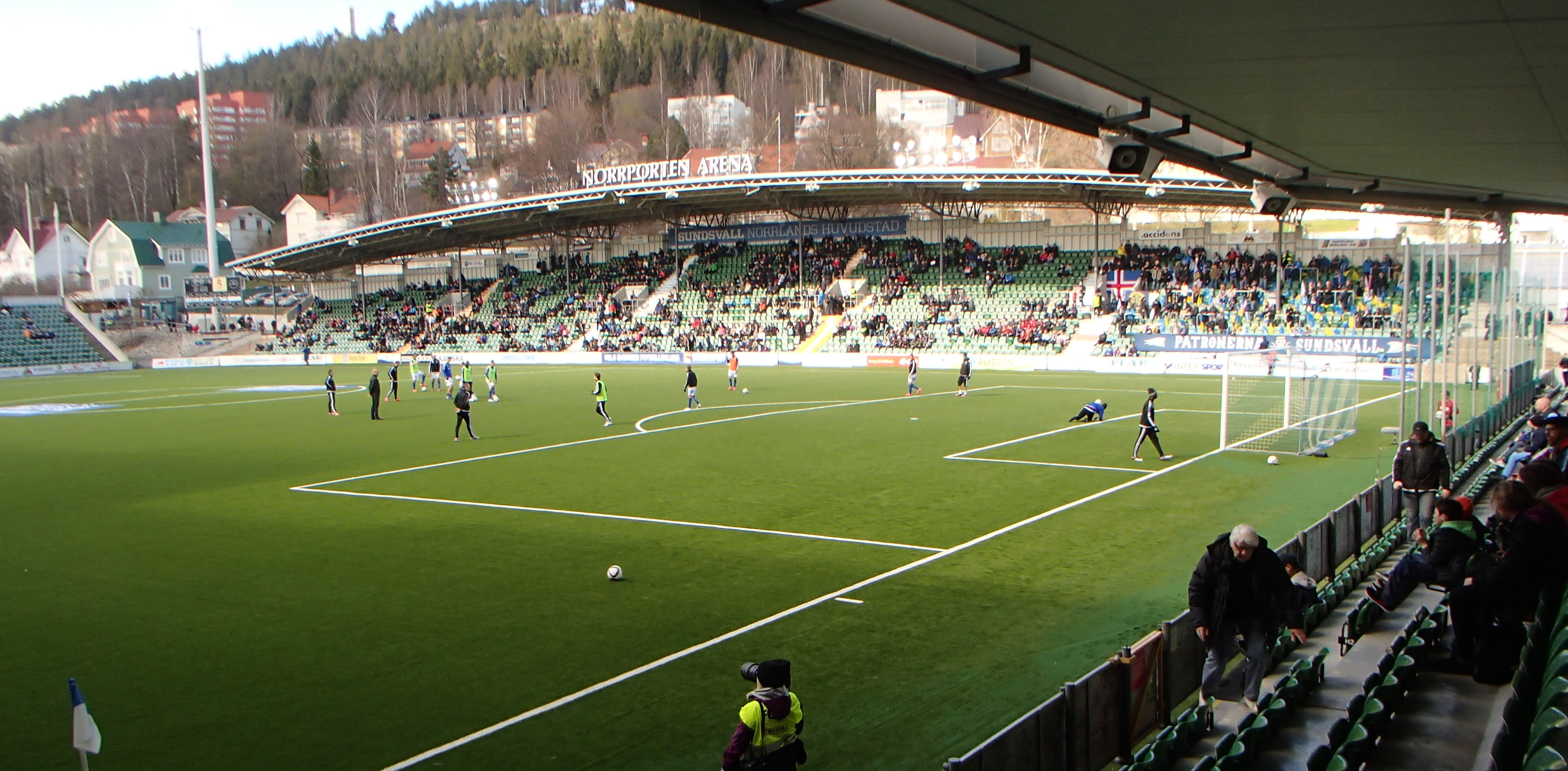
A panorama of NP3 Arena in Sundsvall.

== Supporters ==
The official supporter's club of GIF Sundsvall is called Patronerna. Formed in 1999, mostly as a joke by some friends supporting their friend, the club has in a short period of time amassed a strong reputation. The name is mainly a historical reference to the sawmill owners who were very powerful in Sundsvall during the post-industrial-revolution era. In 2005, FP-tifo, the group who designs the club's terrace choreography, won the Swedish tifo awards arranged by Canal+.

== Achievements ==
- Superettan
  - Runners-up (3): 2011, 2014, 2021
- Division 1 Norra
  - Winners (2): 1990, 1999
- Norrländska Mästerskapet
  - Winners (1): 1942
  - Runners-up (2): 1928, 1951

== Players ==
=== First-team squad ===
As of 25 August 2026

Note: Flags indicate national team as defined under FIFA eligibility rules; some limited exceptions apply. Players may hold more than one non-FIFA nationality.

No.	Pos.	Nation	Player
1	GK	SWE	Jonas Olsson
3	DF	SWE	Malte Hallin
4	DF	SWE	Jakob Hedenquist
5	DF	SWE	Alieu Atlee Manneh
6	MF	ESP	Marc Manchón
7	MF	TPE	Miguel Sandberg
8	FW	SWE	Carl Björk
9	FW	JPN	Taiki Kagayama
11	DF	FIN	Samuel Tammivuori
14	MF	SWE	Alper Demirol
15	FW	SWE	Shalom Ekong (on loan from GAIS)
16	MF	SWE	Elvis Hansson
17	DF	SWE	Nils Eriksson

No.	Pos.	Nation	Player
18	DF	SWE	Lucas Forsberg
19	FW	NOR	Eron Gojani (on loan from HamKam)
20	MF	SWE	Jeremiah Björnler
21	MF	SWE	Ludvig Nåvik
22	FW	SWE	Mille Eriksson
23	MF	SWE	Hugo Aviander
24	MF	SWE	Isak Halling
25	DF	GHA	Charles Baah
26	DF	SWE	Edvard Carrick
27	MF	SWE	Amaro Bahtijar
29	FW	SWE	Abdulahi Shino
35	GK	SWE	Jakob Jäger Röding

=== Out on loan ===
Note: Flags indicate national team as defined under FIFA eligibility rules; some limited exceptions apply. Players may hold more than one non-FIFA nationality.

No.	Pos.	Nation	Player
13	GK	SWE	Daniel Henareh (at IF Karlstad until 30 November 2026)
21	MF	SWE	Kawa Sulaiman (at Piteå IF until 30 November 2026)

No.	Pos.	Nation	Player
24	FW	SWE	Henrik Bäckström (at Kubikenborgs IF until 30 November 2026)
29	DF	SWE	Joshua Mambu (at Piteå IF until 30 November 2026)

=== Retired numbers ===
10 – Leif Forsberg, forward (1980–1988, 1990–2001)

== Managers ==
Name	Year(s)
(Sweden) Stig Sundqvist	1955–58
(England) Jimmy Meadows	1976
(Sweden) Anders Grönhagen	1986–89
(Sweden) Jan Mattsson	1990–92
(Sweden) Anders Grönhagen	1999–01
(Norway) Per Joar Hansen	2002–03
(Republic of Ireland) Patrick Walker	2003
(Sweden) Rikard Norling	2004
(Norway) Jan Halvor Halvorsen	2005
(Sweden) Anders Högman	2005
(England) David Wilson	2005–06
(Finland) Mika Sankala	2006–07
(Norway) Per Joar Hansen	2008
(Sweden) Sören Åkeby	October 2008 – November 12
(Sweden) Roger Franzén	November 2012 – September 16
(Sweden) Joel Cedergren	November 2012 – August 19
(Sweden) Tony Gustavsson	August 2019 – December 2019
(Sweden) Henrik Åhnstrand	2019 – July 2022
(United States) Brian Clarhaut	July 2022 – December 2022
(Sweden) Douglas Jakobsen	January 2023 – June 2024
(Spain) Ion Doros	June 2024 – 12 July 2024
(Finland) Erol Ates	12 July 2024 – 16 May 2026
(Spain) Ion Doros	16 May 2026 – 7 July 2026
(Norway) Per Joar Hansen	7 July 2026 –
