= 1998 Finnish Cup =

1998 Suomen Cup
Tournament details
- Country: Finland

Final positions
- Champions: HJK

The 1998 Finnish Cup (Finnish: Suomen Cup) was the 44th season of the main annual association football cup competition in Finland. It was organised as a single-elimination knock–out tournament and participation in the competition was voluntary. The final was held at the Olympic Stadium, Helsinki on 31 October 1998 with HJK defeating PK-35 by 3-2 before an attendance of 5,023 spectators.

== Early rounds ==
Not currently available.

== Round 7 ==
| Tie no | Home team | Score | Away team | Information |
|---|---|---|---|---|
| 1 | JJK Jyväskylä | 2-1 | Jaro Pietarsaari | |
| 2 | Pyry Nokia | 2-1 | Inter Turku | |
| 3 | KajHa Kajaani | 1-2 | FinnPa Helsinki | |
| 4 | KTP Kotka | 0-2 | PK-35 Helsinki | |

| Tie no | Home team | Score | Away team | Information |
|---|---|---|---|---|
| 5 | MP Mikkeli | 0-3 | Jazz Pori | |
| 6 | KPT-85 Kemi | 0-1 | MyPa Anjalankoski | |
| 7 | FC Lahti | 0-3 | Haka Valkeakoski | |
| 8 | TPS Turku | 0-5 | HJK Helsinki | |

== Quarter-finals ==
| Tie no | Home team | Score | Away team | Information |
|---|---|---|---|---|
| 1 | PK-35 Helsinki | 3-2 (aet) | Jazz Pori | |
| 2 | JJK Jyväskylä | 0-2 | Pyry Nokia | |

| Tie no | Home team | Score | Away team | Information |
|---|---|---|---|---|
| 3 | FinnPa Helsinki | 1-1 (aet); 5-4 (p.) | Haka Valkeakoski | |
| 4 | HJK Helsinki | 3-2 | MyPa Anjalankoski | |

== Semi-finals ==
| Tie no | Home team | Score | Away team | Information |
|---|---|---|---|---|
| 1 | FinnPa Helsinki | 0-3 | PK-35 Helsinki | |

| Tie no | Home team | Score | Away team | Information |
|---|---|---|---|---|
| 2 | HJK Helsinki | 1-0 | Pyry Nokia | |

== Final ==
| Tie no | Team 1 | Score | Team 2 | Information |
|---|---|---|---|---|
| 1 | HJK Helsinki | 3-2 | PK-35 Helsinki | Att. 5,023 |
