= Sakari Juuti =

Finnish lawyer and diplomat (born 1931)

Leo Taisto Sakari Juuti (born 14 January 1931) is a Finnish diplomat and lawyer.

Juuti was born in Terijoki, and obtained a master's degree in law in 1956.

He was an Ambassador in Havana between 1980 and 1983, and since 1983 he has been the Chief of the Legal Department of the Ministry for Foreign Affairs. Previously, he had been Finnish Chargé d'Affaires to Addis Ababa from 1977 to 1979.
