= 1998 Veikkausliiga =

Veikkausliiga
- Season: 1998

Statistics of Veikkausliiga in the 1998 season.

== Overview ==
It was contested by 10 teams, and newly promoted Haka Valkeakoski won the championship.

== League standings ==
Pos	Team	Pld	W	D	L	GF	GA	GD	Pts	Qualification or relegation
1	Haka (C)	27	13	9	5	46	31	+15	48	Qualification to Champions League first qualifying round
2	VPS	27	12	9	6	42	27	+15	45	Qualification to UEFA Cup qualifying round
3	PK-35	27	11	11	5	36	24	+12	44	
4	HJK	27	9	11	7	33	31	+2	38	Qualification to UEFA Cup qualifying round (Note: HJK Helsinki as winners of the 1998 Finnish Cup qualified for the qualifying round of the 1999–2000 UEFA Cup.)
5	Jazz	27	9	8	10	37	36	+1	35	
6	TPS	27	8	10	9	25	31	−6	34	
7	MyPa	27	8	8	11	35	39	−4	32	
8	RoPS	27	6	14	7	27	31	−4	32	
9	FinnPa (R)	27	5	11	11	37	43	−6	26	Qualification to relegation play-offs
10	FF Jaro (R)	27	4	9	14	25	50	−25	21	Relegation to Ykkönen

Source: rsssf.com
(C) Champions; (R) Relegated

== Results ==
=== Matches 1–18 ===
Home \ Away	FPA	HAK	HJK	JAR	JAZ	MYP	P35	RPS	TPS	VPS
FinnPa		1–3	1–2	6–2	4–2	2–2	0–0	1–2	1–1	2–2
FC Haka	1–1		2–2	1–1	2–3	2–1	0–0	4–2	1–0	2–1
HJK Helsinki	2–4	1–1		1–1	1–0	1–1	0–0	2–0	1–2	1–1
Jaro	0–0	0–4	0–1		1–0	4–3	0–3	1–1	5–0	0–1
Jazz	5–1	0–4	2–1	0–0		1–2	1–1	2–1	0–0	0–1
MyPa	3–0	0–0	1–1	2–0	1–0		0–2	2–2	0–1	0–3
PK-35	1–0	5–1	0–1	1–0	2–2	2–0		1–1	3–1	1–1
RoPS	1–1	1–1	0–1	0–1	1–1	0–2	1–1		2–0	2–1
TPS	1–0	1–2	1–1	3–0	1–1	2–2	1–1	0–0		1–2
VPS	3–1	3–0	1–1	3–0	4–0	3–2	2–1	0–2	0–2	

Legend: Blue = home team win; Yellow = draw; Red = away team win.

=== Matches 19–27 ===
Home \ Away	FPA	HAK	HJK	JAR	JAZ	MYP	P35	RPS	TPS	VPS
FinnPa		2–2	4–2						2–0	0–0
FC Haka					3–2	4–0	3–1	0–0	0–1	
HJK Helsinki		0–1		4–2		0–0		0–2		3–1
Jaro	2–2	1–2						0–0		1–1
Jazz	1–0		2–1	5–1			4–1			
MyPa	2–1			3–0	1–3			1–1		
PK-35	1–0		1–1	2–1		1–0				1–1
RoPS	0–0				0–0		2–1		3–3	
TPS			0–1	1–1	1–0	1–0	0–2			
VPS		1–0			0–0	2–4		4–0	0–0	

Legend: Blue = home team win; Yellow = draw; Red = away team win.

== Attendances ==
No.	Club	Average
1	HJK	3,460
2	VPS	3,055
3	Jokerit	2,567
4	TPS	2,248
5	Haka	1,969
6	Jazz	1,825
7	FinnPa	1,804
8	MyPa	1,450
9	Jaro	1,355
10	RoPS	1,153

== See also ==
- Suomen Cup 1998
