= Ville Nikkanen =

Finnish politician (1885–1960)

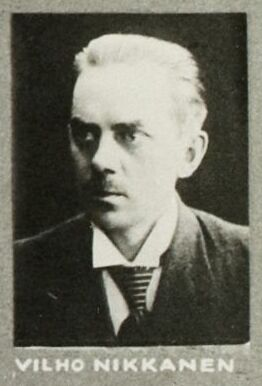
- Ville Nikkanen, c.1930
- Born: 4 July 1885
- Died: 5 August 1960 (aged 75)
- Occupations: Farmer and Politician

Vilhelm (Ville) Nikkanen (4 July 1885, Uusikirkko Vpl - 5 August 1960) was a Finnish farmer and politician. He was a member of the Parliament of Finland from 1919 to 1933, representing the National Coalition Party.
