= PK-35 (men) =

Finnish football team

- Full name: Pallokerho-35
- Founded: as Viipurin Pallokerho, 1935 as Pallokerho-35, 1948 (as PK-35 Vantaa, 2008) as PK-35, 2015
- Ground: Mustapekka Areena; Helsinki
- Capacity: 2,700
- Manager: Tiago Santos
- League: Ykkösliiga
- 2026: Ykkösliiga, 2nd of 10
- Website: www.pk-35.fi
Home colours	Away colours

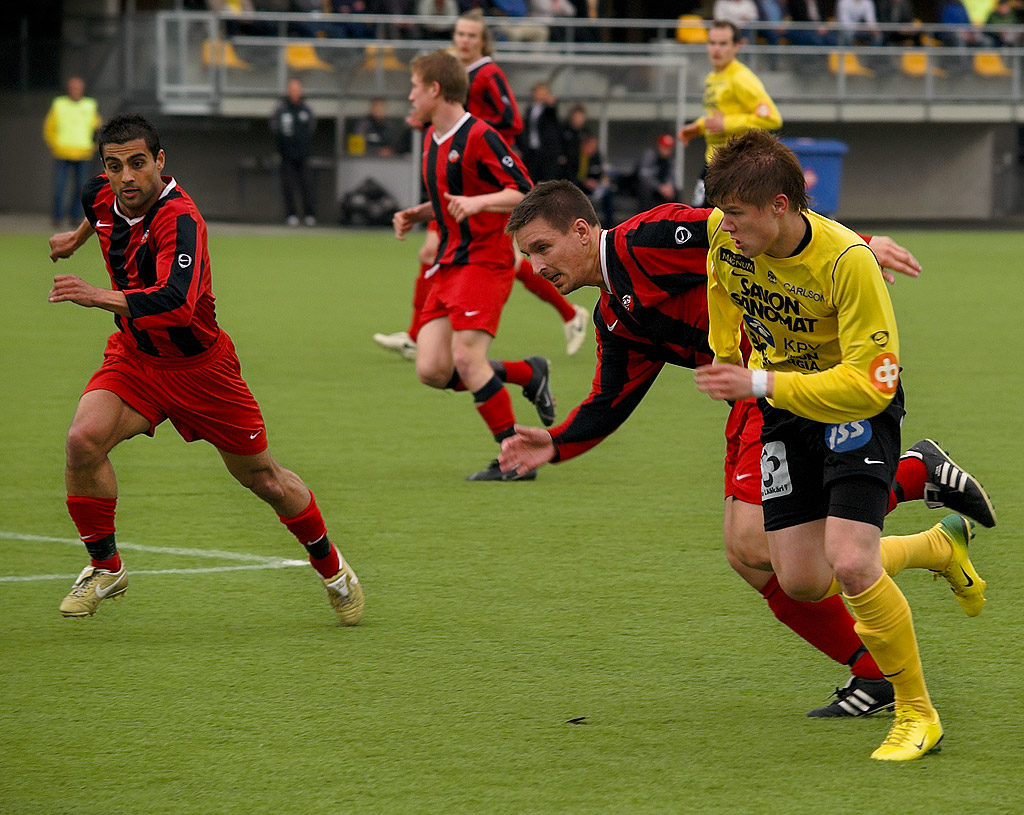
PK-35 playing against KuPS in a Ykkönen match in 2007.

PK-35 (originally Pallokerho-35) is a Finnish men's professional football club, based in Helsinki. It currently competes in the Ykkösliiga, the second-tier of men's football league in Finland. The club is based at the Algeco Areena in the Pihlajamäki district of Helsinki, and its colours are red, black and white. The club has played mostly in the lower divisions during its history, except for the lone season in top-tier Veikkausliiga in 1998.

== History ==
PK-35 was founded in Vyborg as Viipurin Pallokerho in 1935. After the Finnish Winter War and Second World War, the club was refounded as Pallokerho-35 by the Karelian refugees in Helsinki in 1948. The name Viipuri (Vyborg) was dropped off from the name due to Soviet pressure because it was not tolerated to use the names of places of the occupied Karelian territory. In the 1950s, the club operated mostly in the Kallio neighbourhood of Helsinki, from which it expanded to Pakila and other newly built areas in Northern Helsinki. In 1966, PK-35 settled in the Pihlajamäki area. The club played mostly in the lower divisions in the Finnish football league system until 1990s.

The mid-1990s were successful years for PK-35, when the club was coached by Pasi Rautiainen. They won promotions from fourth-tier Kolmonen in 1994 all the way to the Finland's top division, Veikkausliiga for the 1998 Veikkausliiga season. The club also acquired former Finnish national team players such as Petri Helin and Kimmo Tarkkio. PK finished 3rd in the league, and made it to the 1998 Finnish Cup final, but at the end of the season after some economic troubles, the club's top representative team was acquired by Hjallis Harkimo and it was renamed FC Jokerit. The PK-35 club, however, continued with the other teams in lower divisions using its original name. PK-35 was promoted to Kakkonen in 2001 and to Ykkönen in 2005.

=== PK-35 Vantaa: 2008–2016 ===
In 2008, the club's men's and women's first teams detached from the organisation and relocated to Myyrmäki, Vantaa and gained the club's league license and continued playing in the second-tier Ykkönen under the name PK-35 Vantaa.

=== Helsinki ===
PK-35 stayed in Helsinki with their youth sector and reserve team playing in fourth-tier Kolmonen. The reserve and academy team merged with Vantaan Jalkapalloseura (VJS) and were promoted to the third-tier Kakkonen for the 2012 season.

For the 2015 Kolmonen season, PK-35 and VJS separated and PK continued playing in Pihlajamäki, Helsinki. After the PK-35 Vantaa were declared for bankruptcy at the end of 2016, Helsinki-based PK-35 continued as the club's only representative team, competing in Kolmonen, the fourth tier at the time.

In the 2018 season, the team was coached by Jarkko Siikava, Tuomo Berg and Kim Raimi. For the 2019 season, the club acquired Esa Terävä and he was named the team captain. At the end of the season, PK-35 won a promotion to third-tier Kakkonen for the 2020 season. Next season, the club went on to finish 1st in Kakkonen Group A, and were promoted to then second tier Ykkönen. Former player and current assistant coach Kim Raimi was named the club's new manager, starting in 2021. After two seasons in Ykkönen, PK-35 were relegated back to Kakkonen at the end of the 2022 season.

In the 2023 Kakkonen season, PK-35 finished in the 2nd place of Group A. After the dissolution of FC Honka and HIFK, and the creation of the new second-tier Ykkösliiga, the club were granted a spot to 2024 Ykkösliiga, via promotion-playoffs. However, in the early June 2024, head coach Kim Raimi was dismissed after ten league matches due to relatively poor results. Prior to his departure, PK had a record of two wins, four draws and four losses. A former EPS and Atlantis head coach Tiago Santos was appointed as his replacement.

In late November 2024, it was announced that PK would move to Mustapekka Areena in Oulunkylä neighbourhood for the 2025 season, as their home stadium Algeco Areena does not meet the requirements for the league license anymore. Two points will be also deducted from the club as they failed to improve the stadium conditions in time.

== Honours ==
- Veikkausliiga
  - Third place (1): 1998
- Finnish Cup
  - Runners-up (1): 1998
- Kakkonen (third tier)
  - Champions (1): 2020
  - Runners-up (1): 2023
- Kolmonen (fourth tier)
  - Champions (1): 2019
  - Runners-up (1): 2018

== Season to season ==
Season to season of PK-35
- 1 season in Veikkausliiga
- 10 seasons in Second Tier
- 11 seasons in Third Tier
- 29 seasons in Fourth Tier
- 10 seasons in Fifth Tier

Season	Level	Division	Section	Administration	Position	Finnish Cup	Movements
1938	Tier 3	Maakuntasarja (Regional League)		Finnish FA			Promotion Playoff - Promoted
1939	Tier 2	Itä-Länsi-sarja (East-West League)	East League, Southern Group	Finnish FA	7th		Operations discontinued due to WWII
1961	Tier 4	Aluesarja (Area League)	Group 1	Finnish FA	2nd		Promotion Playoff
1962	Tier 4	Aluesarja (Area League)	Group 2	Finnish FA	3rd		
1963	Tier 4	Aluesarja (Area League)	Group 2	Finnish FA	2nd		Promotion Playoff - Promoted
1964	Tier 3	Maakuntasarja (Regional League)	Group 1	Finnish FA	8th		Relegated
1965	Tier 4	Aluesarja (Area League)	Group 1	Finnish FA	2nd		
1966	Tier 4	Aluesarja (Area League)	Group 1	Finnish FA	4th		
1967	Tier 4	Aluesarja (Area League)	Group 2	Finnish FA	3rd		
1968	Tier 4	Aluesarja (Area League)	Group 2	Finnish FA	6th		Relegated
1969							Unknown
1970							Unknown
1971							Unknown
1972	Tier 4	IV. Divisioona (Fourth Division)	Group 2	Finnish FA	5th		
1973	Tier 5	IV. divisioona (Fourth Division)	Group 3	Helsinki & Uusimaa (SPL Helsinki)	5th		
1974	Tier 5	IV. divisioona (Fourth Division)	Group 2	Helsinki & Uusimaa (SPL Helsinki)	1st		Promoted
1975	Tier 4	III. Divisioona (Third Division)	Group 1	Helsinki & Uusimaa (SPL Helsinki)	9th		Relegated
1976	Tier 5	IV. divisioona (Fourth Division)	Group 2	Helsinki & Uusimaa (SPL Helsinki)	4th		
1977	Tier 5	IV. divisioona (Fourth Division)	Group 1	Helsinki & Uusimaa (SPL Helsinki)	4th		
1978	Tier 5	IV. divisioona (Fourth Division)	Group 1	Helsinki & Uusimaa (SPL Helsinki)	1st		Promoted
1979	Tier 4	III. Divisioona (Third Division)	Group 2	Helsinki & Uusimaa (SPL Helsinki)	10th		
1980	Tier 4	III. Divisioona (Third Division)	Group 1	Helsinki & Uusimaa (SPL Helsinki)	10th		Relegation Playoff - Relegated
1981	Tier 5	IV. divisioona (Fourth Division)	Group 2	Helsinki & Uusimaa (SPL Helsinki)	5th		
1982	Tier 5	IV. divisioona (Fourth Division)	Group 3	Helsinki & Uusimaa (SPL Helsinki)	1st		Promotion Playoff - Promoted
1983	Tier 4	III. Divisioona (Third Division)	Group 2	Helsinki & Uusimaa (SPL Helsinki)	11th		
1984	Tier 4	III. Divisioona (Third Division)	Group 2	Helsinki & Uusimaa (SPL Helsinki)	11th		Relegated
1985	Tier 5	IV. divisioona (Fourth Division)	Group 2	Helsinki & Uusimaa (SPL Helsinki)	4th		
1986	Tier 5	IV. divisioona (Fourth Division)	Group 2	Helsinki & Uusimaa (SPL Helsinki)	10th		
1987	Tier 5	IV. divisioona (Fourth Division)	Group 1	Helsinki & Uusimaa (SPL Helsinki)	12th		Relegated
1988							Unknown
1989							Unknown
1990							Unknown
1991	Tier 4	III. Divisioona (Third Division)	Group 2	Helsinki & Uusimaa (SPL Helsinki)	5th		
1992	Tier 4	III. Divisioona (Third Division)	Group 2	Helsinki & Uusimaa (SPL Helsinki)	5th		
1993	Tier 4	Kolmonen (Third Division)	Helsinki & Uusimaa II	Helsinki & Uusimaa (SPL Helsinki)			
1994	Tier 4	Kolmonen (Third Division)	Helsinki & Uusimaa II	Helsinki & Uusimaa (SPL Helsinki)			Promoted
1995	Tier 3	Kakkonen		Finnish FA			
1996	Tier 3	Kakkonen		Finnish FA			Promoted
1997	Tier 2	Ykkönen		Finnish FA			Promoted
1998	Tier 1	Veikkausliiga (Premier League)		Finnish FA	3rd	Runner-up	The first team was sold and renamed FC Jokerit for the 1999.
1999	Tier 4	Kolmonen (Third Division)	Helsinki & Uusimaa II	Helsinki & Uusimaa (SPL Helsinki)			
2000	Tier 4	Kolmonen (Third Division)	Helsinki & Uusimaa II	Helsinki & Uusimaa (SPL Helsinki)			Promoted
2001	Tier 3	Kakkonen		Finnish FA			
2002	Tier 3	Kakkonen		Finnish FA			
2003	Tier 3	Kakkonen		Finnish FA			
2004	Tier 3	Kakkonen		Finnish FA			Promoted
2005	Tier 2	Ykkönen		Finnish FA			
2006	Tier 2	Ykkönen		Finnish FA			
2007	Tier 2	Ykkönen		Finnish FA			
2008	Tier 2	Ykkönen		Finnish FA			PK-35 Vantaa gained the league license for 2009 Ykkönen.
2009	Tier 4	Kolmonen (Third Division)	Helsinki & Uusimaa II	Helsinki & Uusimaa (SPL Helsinki)			
2010	Tier 4	Kolmonen (Third Division)	Helsinki & Uusimaa II	Helsinki & Uusimaa (SPL Helsinki)			
2011	Tier 4	Kolmonen (Third Division)	Helsinki & Uusimaa II	Helsinki & Uusimaa (SPL Helsinki)			
2012	Tier 3	Kakkonen		Finnish FA			
2013	Tier 4	Kolmonen (Third Division)	Helsinki & Uusimaa II	Helsinki & Uusimaa (SPL Helsinki)			
2014	Tier 4	Kolmonen (Third Division)	Helsinki & Uusimaa II	Helsinki & Uusimaa (SPL Helsinki)			
2015	Tier 4	Kolmonen (Third Division)	Helsinki & Uusimaa II	Helsinki & Uusimaa (SPL Helsinki)			
2016	Tier 4	Kolmonen (Third Division)	Helsinki & Uusimaa II	Helsinki & Uusimaa (SPL Helsinki)	8th		
2017	Tier 4	Kolmonen (Third Division)	Helsinki & Uusimaa II	Helsinki & Uusimaa (SPL Helsinki)	3rd		
2018	Tier 4	Kolmonen (Third Division)	Helsinki & Uusimaa I	Helsinki & Uusimaa (SPL Helsinki)	2nd		
2019	Tier 4	Kolmonen (Third Division)	Helsinki & Uusimaa II	Helsinki & Uusimaa (SPL Helsinki)	1st		Promoted
2020	Tier 3	Kakkonen	Group A	Finnish FA	1st		Promoted
2021	Tier 2	Ykkönen		Finnish FA	8th	Quarter-finals	
2022	Tier 2	Ykkönen		Finnish FA	10th	Quarter-finals	Relegated
2023	Tier 3	Kakkonen	Group A	Finnish FA	2nd	Third round	Promotion play-offs – Promoted
2024	Tier 2	Ykkösliiga		Finnish FA	6th	Sixth round	
2025	Tier 2	Ykkösliiga		Finnish FA			

== Players and personnel ==
Updated 3 September 2026

=== Current squad ===
Note: Flags indicate national team as defined under FIFA eligibility rules; some limited exceptions apply. Players may hold more than one non-FIFA nationality.

No.	Pos.	Nation	Player
1	GK	FIN	Alex Ramula
2	DF	FIN	Rasmus Sipi
3	DF	FIN	Alexander Forsström
4	MF	SOM	Ayuub Abdi
6	DF	JPN	Juta Nakanishi
7	FW	POR	Pedro Diniz
8	MF	BRA	João Costa
9	FW	FIN	Irfan Sadik (captain)
10	FW	FIN	Otto Salmensuu
12	GK	FIN	Diar Azabani
14	MF	JPN	Emu Kawakita
15	MF	FIN	Joona Tapani

No.	Pos.	Nation	Player
17	FW	IRQ	Arez Goshnaw
18	MF	FIN	Eino-Iivari Pitkälä
19	MF	FIN	Maximo Tolonen
21	DF	FIN	Karo Räsänen
22	DF	FIN	Liam Lokake
23	DF	JPN	Shunta Uchiyama
24	MF	FIN	Ngabo Ndaziramiye
25	GK	FIN	Atte Kivelä
27	FW	SOM	Ayuub Ahmed-Nur
34	DF	FIN	Tuukka Andberg
88	MF	FIN	Jasper Pikkuhookana

=== Players on loan ===
Note: Flags indicate national team as defined under FIFA eligibility rules; some limited exceptions apply. Players may hold more than one non-FIFA nationality.

No.	Pos.	Nation	Player
16	DF	FIN	Niklas Jokiniemi (at SalPa until 31 December 2026)

=== Coaches and staff ===
Name	Role
(Portugal) Tiago Santos	Head coach
(Portugal) Diogo Pinto	Assistant coach
(Italy) Luca Fleres	Fitness coach
(Finland) Jussi Jääskeläinen	Goalkeeping coach
(Finland) Felix Hauernherm	Physiotherapist
(Finland) Jarkko Siikava	Director of football

== Notable former players ==
- (Finland) Jasin-Amin Assehnoun
- (Finland) Petri Helin
- (Finland) Erik Holmgren
- (Finland) Robert Ivanov
- (Finland) Joel Pohjanpalo
- (Finland) Juho Rantala
- (Finland) Rami Rantanen
- (Finland) Pasi Rautiainen
- (Finland) Pekka Sihvola
- (Finland) Kimmo Tarkkio
- (Finland) Sauli Väisänen
- (Finland) Moshtagh Yaghoubi
- (Philippines) Oskari Kekkonen
