= Jaakko Juuti =

Finnish footballer (born 1987)

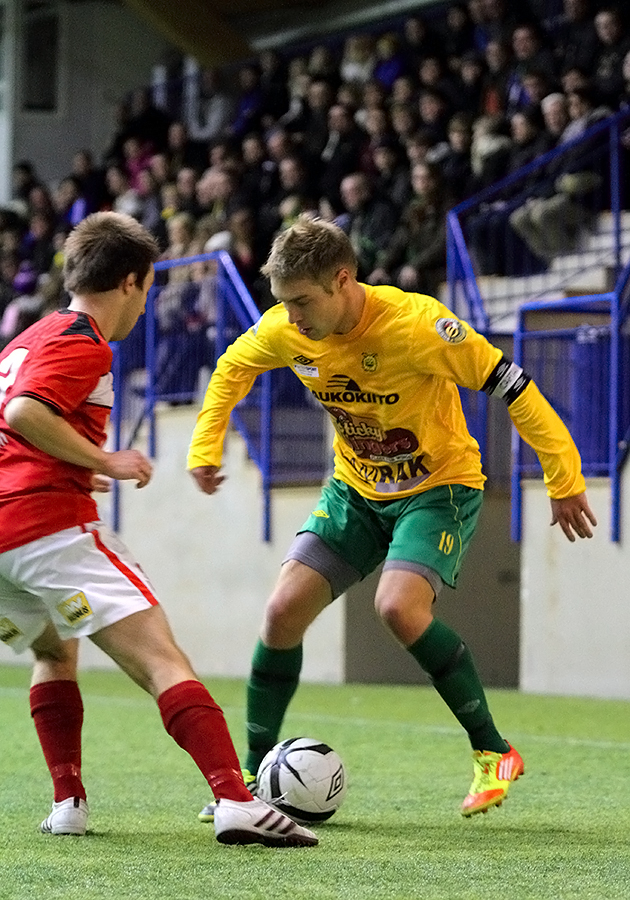

Personal information
- Date of birth: 13 August 1987 (age 39)
- Place of birth: Kajaani, Finland
- Height: 1.78 m (5 ft 10 in)
- Position: Midfielder

Team information
- Current team: Ilves
- Number: 19

Senior career*
Years	Team	Apps	(Gls)
2005–2006	Haka	1	(0)
2006	PS-44	18	(1)
2007	PP-70	25	(1)
2008–2009	FC Hämeenlinna	51	(6)
2010–2011	Haka	48	(2)
2012–	Ilves	68	(11)
- * Club domestic league appearances and goals

Jaakko Juuti (born 13 August 1987) is a Finnish professional footballer, who plays as a midfielder for Finnish premier division club Ilves.
