= Järvenpään Palloseura =

Association football club in Finland

- Full name: Järvenpään Palloseura
- Nickname: JäPS
- Founded: 1947; 79 years ago
- Ground: Järvenpään keskuskenttä, Järvenpää, Finland
- Chairman: Kai Luolavuo
- Manager: Teemu Kankkunen
- League: Ykkösliiga
- 2026: Ykkösliiga, 5th of 10
Home colours	Away colours

Järvenpään Palloseura (abbreviated JäPS) is a football club from Järvenpää, Finland. It was formed in 1947 and is based at the Järvenpää keskuskenttä. The club currently competes in Ykkösliiga, the new second-tier level of Finnish football.

== Background ==
In six decades JäPS evolved from a small local team into one of Finland's largest football clubs, serving Järvenpää and the surrounding area. JäPS has around 1,400 members, 1000 of whom are juniors who participate in the girls and boys teams.

In 1978 and 2001 JäPS progressed through to the Kakkonen (Second Division), the third tier of the Finnish football system, but at the end of each season they were relegated back to the Kolmonen (Third Division).

In 2003 JäPS men's team reached the Pikkufinaali (Small Final) of the Suomen Cup (Finnish Cup), being the best Kolmonen team in the Suomen Cup. The team were rewarded by progressing through to the UEFA Regions' Cup in Bulgaria.

JäPS was active in the summer transfer window 2024 as Linus Rönnberg joined Polish club Podbeskidzie Bielsko-Biała, manager Erol Ates left for GIF Sundsvall, and Irfan Sadik moved to Bulgarian side OFC Belasitsa Petrich. JäPS was entitled to a compensation for all of these transfers. After the 2024 season, Altti Hellemaa moved to Trelleborgs FF in Sweden.

== Current squad ==
As of 3 September 2026

Note: Flags indicate national team as defined under FIFA eligibility rules; some limited exceptions apply. Players may hold more than one non-FIFA nationality.

No.	Pos.	Nation	Player
1	GK	FIN	Niklas Voutilainen
2	DF	FIN	Niko Manner
3	DF	FIN	Peetu Haikonen
4	DF	FIN	Jesse Nikki
5	DF	FIN	Taavi Arminen
6	MF	SOM	Omar Jama
8	MF	FIN	Reza Heidari
9	FW	FIN	Aleksi Ristola
10	DF	FIN	Ville Ahola
12	FW	FIN	Miko Koskelainen
13	DF	FIN	Aleksi Sainio
14	MF	FIN	Riku Selander

No.	Pos.	Nation	Player
15	FW	FIN	Oskar Dahlfors
17	MF	FIN	Veka Ketonen
18	FW	FIN	Jermu Virtanen
19	MF	FIN	Herkko Kuosa
20	DF	FIN	Henrik Ölander
21	FW	FIN	Charles Katashira
22	MF	FIN	Gabriel Taskos
23	FW	FIN	Hugo Hahl
27	FW	FIN	Impton Söderlund
36	GK	FIN	Topi Valtonen
41	DF	FIN	Julius Salo
77	GK	FIN	Besart Mustafa

=== Out on loan ===
Note: Flags indicate national team as defined under FIFA eligibility rules; some limited exceptions apply. Players may hold more than one non-FIFA nationality.

No.	Pos.	Nation	Player
25	DF	FIN	Olli Valto (at HIFK until 31 December 2026)

== Season to season ==
Season to season of JäPS

Season	Level	Division	Section	Administration	Position	Movements
1950	Tier 4	Piirinsarja (District League)	South Group	Finnish FA (Suomen Pallolitto)		Promotion Playoff second round
1951	Tier 4	Piirinsarja (District League)	South Group	Finnish FA (Suomen Pallolitto)		Promotion Playoff second round
1952						Unknown
1953						Unknown
1954						Unknown
1955						Unknown
1956	Tier 4	Aluesarja (Area Series)	Group 3	Finnish FA (Suomen Pallolitto)	2nd	
1957	Tier 4	Aluesarja (Area Series)	Group 3	Finnish FA (Suomen Pallolitto)	5th	
1958	Tier 4	Aluesarja (Area Series)	Group 3	Finnish FA (Suomen Pallolitto)	3rd	
1959	Tier 4	Aluesarja (Area Series)	Group 3	Finnish FA (Suomen Pallolitto)	4th	
1960	Tier 4	Aluesarja (Area Series)	Group 4	Finnish FA (Suomen Pallolitto)	3rd	
1961	Tier 4	Aluesarja (Area Series)	Group 6	Finnish FA (Suomen Pallolitto)	3rd	
1962	Tier 4	Aluesarja (Area Series)	Group 6	Finnish FA (Suomen Pallolitto)	4th	
1963	Tier 4	Aluesarja (Area Series)	Group 6	Finnish FA (Suomen Pallolitto)	3rd	
1964	Tier 4	Aluesarja (Area Series)	Group 1	Finnish FA (Suomen Pallolitto)	6th	Relegated
1965						Unknown
1966						Unknown
1967	Tier 4	Aluesarja (Area Series)	Group 1	Finnish FA (Suomen Pallolitto)	6th	Relegated
1968						Unknown
1969						Unknown
1970						Unknown
1971						Unknown
1972	Tier 4	4. divisioona (Fourth Division)	Group 1	Finnish FA (Suomen Pallolitto)	4th	
1973	Tier 5	4. divisioona (Fourth Division)	Group 2	Helsinki & Uusimaa (SPL Uusimaa)	3rd	
1974	Tier 5	4. divisioona (Fourth Division)	Group 1	Helsinki & Uusimaa (SPL Uusimaa)	1st	Promotion Playoff
1975	Tier 5	4. divisioona (Fourth Division)	Group 2	Helsinki & Uusimaa (SPL Uusimaa)	1st	Promoted
1976	Tier 4	3. divisioona (Third Division)	Group 1	Helsinki & Uusimaa (SPL Uusimaa)	4th	
1977	Tier 4	3. divisioona (Third Division)	Group 2	Helsinki & Uusimaa (SPL Uusimaa)	1st	Promoted
1978	Tier 3	2. divisioona (Second Division)	East Group	Finnish FA (Suomen Pallolitto)	12th	Relegated
1979	Tier 4	3. divisioona (Third Division)	Group 1	Helsinki & Uusimaa (SPL Uusimaa)	8th	
1980	Tier 4	3. divisioona (Third Division)	Group 1	Helsinki & Uusimaa (SPL Uusimaa)	2nd	Promotion Playoff
1981	Tier 4	3. divisioona (Third Division)	Group 1	Helsinki & Uusimaa (SPL Uusimaa)	4th	
1982	Tier 4	3. divisioona (Third Division)	Group 1	Helsinki & Uusimaa (SPL Uusimaa)	7th	
1983	Tier 4	3. divisioona (Third Division)	Group 1	Helsinki & Uusimaa (SPL Uusimaa)	2nd	Promotion Playoff
1984	Tier 4	3. divisioona (Third Division)	Group 1	Helsinki & Uusimaa (SPL Uusimaa)	8th	
1985	Tier 4	3. divisioona (Third Division)	Group 2	Helsinki & Uusimaa (SPL Uusimaa)	12th	Relegated
1986	Tier 5	4. divisioona (Fourth Division)	Group 2	Helsinki & Uusimaa (SPL Uusimaa)	4th	
1987						Unknown
1988						Unknown
1989	Tier 4	3. divisioona (Third Division)	Group 1	Helsinki & Uusimaa (SPL Uusimaa)	2nd	
1990	Tier 4	3. divisioona (Third Division)	Group 1	Helsinki & Uusimaa (SPL Uusimaa)	6th	
1991	Tier 4	3. divisioona (Third Division)	Group 1	Helsinki & Uusimaa (SPL Uusimaa)	9th	
1992	Tier 4	3. divisioona (Third Division)	Group 1	Helsinki & Uusimaa (SPL Uusimaa)	6th	
1993	Tier 4	Kolmonen (Third Division)	Group 1	Helsinki & Uusimaa (SPL Uusimaa)	9th	
1994	Tier 4	Kolmonen (Third Division)	Group 2	Helsinki & Uusimaa (SPL Uusimaa)	12th	Relegated
1995						Unknown
1996						Unknown
1997	Tier 4	Kolmonen (Third Division)	Section 1	Helsinki & Uusimaa (SPL Uusimaa)	4th	
1998	Tier 4	Kolmonen (Third Division)	Section 1	Helsinki & Uusimaa (SPL Uusimaa)	4th	
1999	Tier 4	Kolmonen (Third Division)	Section 2	Helsinki & Uusimaa (SPL Uusimaa)	4th	
2000	Tier 4	Kolmonen (Third Division)	Section 2	Helsinki & Uusimaa (SPL Uusimaa)	1st	Promoted
2001	Tier 3	Kakkonen (Second Division)	South Group	Finnish FA (Suomen Pallolitto)	12th	Relegated
2002	Tier 4	Kolmonen (Third Division)	Section 2	Helsinki & Uusimaa (SPL Uusimaa)	2nd	
2003	Tier 4	Kolmonen (Third Division)	Section 2	Helsinki & Uusimaa (SPL Uusimaa)	2nd	
2004	Tier 4	Kolmonen (Third Division)	Section 2	Helsinki & Uusimaa (SPL Uusimaa)	4th	
2005	Tier 4	Kolmonen (Third Division)	Section 2	Helsinki & Uusimaa (SPL Uusimaa)	4th	
2006	Tier 4	Kolmonen (Third Division)	Section 3	Helsinki & Uusimaa (SPL Helsinki)	4th	
2007	Tier 4	Kolmonen (Third Division)	Section 2	Helsinki & Uusimaa (SPL Helsinki)	3rd	
2008	Tier 4	Kolmonen (Third Division)	Section 3	Helsinki & Uusimaa (SPL Helsinki)	3rd	
2009	Tier 4	Kolmonen (Third Division)	Section 3	Helsinki & Uusimaa (SPL Uusimaa)	3rd	
2010	Tier 4	Kolmonen (Third Division)	Section 3	Helsinki & Uusimaa (SPL Uusimaa)	1st	Promoted
2011	Tier 3	Kakkonen (Second Division)	Group B	Finnish FA (Suomen Pallolitto)	6th	
2012	Tier 3	Kakkonen (Second Division)	East Group	Finnish FA (Suomen Pallolitto)	1st	Promotion play-off
2013	Tier 3	Kakkonen (Second Division)	East Group	Finnish FA (Suomen Pallolitto)	8th	
2014	Tier 3	Kakkonen (Second Division)	East Group	Finnish FA (Suomen Pallolitto)	3rd	
2015	Tier 3	Kakkonen (Second Division)	Southern Group	Finnish FA (Suomen Pallolitto)	5th	
2016	Tier 3	Kakkonen (Second Division)	Group A	Finnish FA (Suomen Pallolitto)	4th	
2017	Tier 3	Kakkonen (Second Division)	Group A	Finnish FA (Suomen Pallolitto)	5th	
2018	Tier 3	Kakkonen (Second Division)	Group A	Finnish FA (Suomen Pallolitto)	2nd	
2019	Tier 3	Kakkonen (Second Division)	Group A	Finnish FA (Suomen Pallolitto)	2nd	
2020	Tier 3	Kakkonen (Second Division)	Group A	Finnish FA (Suomen Pallolitto)	4th	
2021	Tier 3	Kakkonen (Second Division)	Group A	Finnish FA (Suomen Pallolitto)	1st	Promoted
2022	Tier 2	Ykkönen (First Division)		Finnish FA (Suomen Pallolitto)	6th	
2023	Tier 2	Ykkönen (First Division)		Finnish FA (Suomen Pallolitto)	9th	
2024	Tier 2	Ykkösliiga (League One)		Finnish FA (Suomen Pallolitto)	5th	
2025	Tier 2	Ykkösliiga (League One)		Finnish FA (Suomen Pallolitto)		

- 4 seasons in 2nd Tier
- 13 seasons in 3rd Tier
- 41 seasons in 4th Tier
- 4 season in 5th Tier

== Structure ==
Järvenpään Palloseura runs three men's teams, a men's veterans team, two ladies teams, eleven boys teams and seven girls teams. It organises diverse activities for its young players, including training camps, games and tournaments. It owns 80% of the Fortum Hall, which it uses for football training.
