= FC Santa Claus =

Finnish association football club

- Full name: FC Santa Claus
- Nickname: Santa
- Founded: 1992 (as FC Santa Claus Rovaniemi); 2012 (re-founded as FC Santa Claus Arctic Circle); 2021 (third edition as FC Santa Claus)
- Ground: Saarenkylän Stadion, Rovaniemi, Finland
- Chairman: Juha Eteläinen
- Coach: Santtu Pätäri
- League: Kolmonen
- Website: http://www.fcsantaclaus.fi/
Home colours	Away colours

FC Santa Claus is a football club from Rovaniemi, Finland that currently plays in the Kolmonen, the fifth tier of the Finnish football league system. The club has played as high as the third tier, Kakkonen, where they have played a total of 14 seasons. They were nearly promoted to the second-tier, Ykkönen, but lost their promotion playoff match to HIFK in 2010.

The club plays at the Saarenkylän Stadion. Previously, they played at the Keskuskenttä Stadium, which seats 4,000 spectators, of which 2,800 are covered — which they shared that stadium with Rovaniemen Palloseura (RoPS), who played in the top tier Veikkausliiga, until their relegation at the end of the 2020 season.

The club was formed as FC Santa Claus Rovaniemi in 1992, through the merger of Rovaniemen Reipas and Rovaniemen Lappi. Following a bankruptcy filing in 2012, the club was re-formed as a new entity under the name FC Santa Claus Arctic Circle. In 2021, the youth club re-founded a senior men's side, as simply FC Santa Claus, following the club's disbanding following the 2019 season.

== Origin of name ==
The origin of the name stems from the legend that Rovaniemi, Finland, is the home town of Santa Claus. They chose to use the English name of Santa Claus, as opposed to the Finnish translation Joulupukki, since English is the most commonly spoken language in the world, allowing for increased awareness of the club. The club receives regular coverage from media outlets around the world, especially during the Christmas season.

Despite playing in the lower divisions, the club has fans around the world due to the unique circumstances of their name. FC Santa Claus developed a legend about how the club was formed that claimed that the club was founded by Santa's elves kicking a leather football in the snow, when they were not wrapping Christmas presents. The club states that they had to ask permission from Santa to use his name, which was granted after Terho Iljin, the club's founder, made the request. In addition, Santa Claus serves as their honorary coach and he attends the team's first match of every season to launch their campaign and often shows up at games during the season as well.

The club's colours are red and white, the colours of Santa Claus, with their alternate kits being white and green, another Christmas themed colour. Their motto is "Don't Stop Believing", referring to the belief of children in the legendary figure. The club is heavily involved with multiple charities, including UNICEF, donating proceeds from their jersey sales to the charity.

The players of the club are mostly made up of local students or workers, who are often involved with the local Christmas market and helping out at the local post office, which receives all of the Finnish letters to Santa, although they have had professional and foreign players in the past. 2021 manager and head of the youth division, German-native Ralf Wunderlich, described FC Santa Claus as the second team of the city of Rovaniemi, with Rovaniemen Palloseura (RoPS) being the more successful and competitive club, but supporting "the spirit of Christmas".

== History ==
=== Formation (1992–2012) ===
Original club crest

The club was formed in 1992, under the name FC Santa Claus Rovaniemi, following the merger of the Rovaniemen Reipas (RoRe) and Rovaniemen Lappi (RoLa) football clubs. RoRe was the more successful of the two founder clubs, playing 12 seasons in the Kakkonen, the third tier of the Finnish football system in the periods of 1978–81, 1984–89, and 1991–92, while RoLa played three seasons at this level in 1987–88 and 1992. The merger consolidated FC Santa Claus as a Kakkonen club, since both founding clubs were in that division.

Early club crest

The club's first crest had a picture of Santa waving while controlling a football, but it was later changed to one of him sitting at a writing desk checking his naughty and nice lists.

Crest of club under original formation

They played their first official match in 1993. In their first season, the club finished in 3rd place in the third tier. The following season, in 1994, they won the Midnattsolscupen (Midnight Sun Cup), an invitational tournament held in Sweden. In 1997, they faced English Premier League club Crystal Palace in a friendly, losing 5–0, with 5000 spectators showing up to the match. They have also played against Nottingham Forest and West Ham United.

After eight seasons in the third tier, they were relegated to the fourth tier Kolmonen, at the end of the 2000 season. They won their Kolmonen division in their first season, but failed to win promotion back to the third tier. They gained promotion back to the Kakkonen after winning their Kolmonen division, and qualifying through the promotion playoffs group, in 2008.

In 2010, they nearly won promotion to the second-tier Ykkönen, after winning their division, however, they lost the promotion playoff match to HIFK.

=== Bankruptcy and re-formation (2013–2019) ===
Revived club logo as FC Santa Claus AC

In 2012, the club experienced significant financial difficulties, resulting in them filing for bankruptcy with debts of €20,000. They re-formed the club under a new association using the name FC Santa Claus Arctic Circle, but the Finnish Football Association denied their request to transfer their position in the third tier Kakkonen to the new group, ruling that they had not taken over the debts of the previous group. The club appealed on the basis that they were willing to take on debts incurred by the sports department, not the bingo activities that had caused the bankruptcy, but their appeal was rejected.

Consequently, FC Santa Claus returned to the fourth tier for 2013, after being unable to re-join the third tier. They finished in third place in 2013, but the following season they won the division, being promoted back to the third tier for the 2015 season. Also in 2013, they reached an agreement with fellow Rovaniemi side RoPS in the top tier, to form a partnership and act as their affiliate club.

They again faced financial difficulties in 2015, but they were saved through signing one-year partnerships with EA Sports and Puma, with Puma manufacturing the jerseys with EA as the kit sponsor. Prior to this they has worn Adidas kits. Nike became their manufacturer the following season. For 2016, they partnered with Chinese company Bewin Sports and their CEO Marc Gao, who entered into a five-year shirt sponsorship with the club as well as Gao becoming the club's vice-president.

The 2016 season was a difficult one for the club, who, following the departure of several experienced players, were relegated back to the fourth tier after the season, after earning only eight points from two wins and two draws in 22 matches, conceding 102 goals, including a 16–0 loss to AC Kajaani in which they were only able to field 11 players in total, including three goalkeepers, two of whom were forced to play striker, due to a rash of injuries. Later that year, they travelled to Beijing, China, arranged by their new Chinese sponsors, to play a friendly match on Christmas Eve against a group of Chinese celebrities called the China Doubi all-stars, and won the match by a single goal. The following year, they returned to China for another exhibition, where they played with former Italian national team player Alessandro Del Piero and former English national team player Michael Owen.

FC Santa Claus finished in last place in the Kolmonen in 2018, being relegated to the fifth tier Nelonen for 2019. In 2019, they again finished last, being relegated to the sixth tier for 2020. However, instead this edition of the club disbanded after the 2019 season, leaving the league system as the club went bankrupt. A couple of the players decided to register a team in an 8v8 recreational league organized by the referee's association of Rovaniemi, continuing the club unofficially.

=== Third edition of the club (2021–present) ===
It was announced FC Santa Claus would be re-launched in the Finnish national system, for the 2021 season. The new re-launch would be headed by the youth club, FC Santa Claus Juniorit, which had continued to operate, and would revert to the Rovaniemi logo. They re-entered in the sixth tier Vitonen. In their debut match in the sixth tier, after their re-formation, they defeated Kolarin Kontio 4–2. They finished bottom of the table in their return season in 2021. After two seasons in the sixth tier, they were promoted to the fifth tier of Finnish football, Nelonen (which later became the sixth tier, following the introduction of a new professional second-tier). At the end of the 2025 season, the club finished second in the Nelonen, initially not earning promotion, however, first place finishers Kainuun Ärjy declined the promotion, allowing FC Santa Claus to be promoted to the Kolmonen.

== Seasons ==
The following includes the historical season results for FC Santa Claus:

As FC Santa Claus Rovaniemi:

Year	Level	Division	Section	Position	Record	Movements	Finnish Cup
1993	Tier 3	Kakkonen	Northern Group	3rd (12)	10–6–6		Fifth Round
1994	Tier 3	Kakkonen	Northern Group	7th (12)	8–4–10		Quarter-Finals
1995	Tier 3	Kakkonen	Northern Group	6th (12)	9–3–10		Sixth Round
1996	Tier 3	Kakkonen	Northern Group	9th (12)	6–5–11		Fifth Round
1997	Tier 3	Kakkonen	Northern Group	7th(12)	8–4–10		Fifth Round
1998	Tier 3	Kakkonen	Northern Group	7th (12)	9–4–9		Fifth Round
1999	Tier 3	Kakkonen	Northern Group	10th (12)	7–2–13	Relegation Play-offs	Did not enter
2000	Tier 3	Kakkonen	Northern Group	8th (12)	7–5–10	Relegated	Did not enter
2001	Tier 4	Kolmonen	Northern Finland – Lapland	1st (8)	11–0–3	Play-offs	Did not enter
2002	Tier 4	Kolmonen	Northern Finland – Lapland – Group 2	2nd (6)	7–0–3		Did not enter
2003	Tier 4	Kolmonen	Group C	4th (7)	7–1–4		Did not enter
2004	Tier 4	Kolmonen	Lapland	2nd (8)	9–3–2		Did not enter
2005	Tier 4	Kolmonen	Northern Finland	5th (10)	9–3–6		Did not enter
2006	Tier 4	Kolmonen	Northern Finland	5th (12)	11–1–10		Did not enter
2007	Tier 4	Kolmonen	Northern Finland	3rd (11)	11–5–4		Did not enter
2008	Tier 4	Kolmonen	Northern Finland	1st (11)	15–3–2	Play-offs – Promoted	Fourth round
2009	Tier 3	Kakkonen	Group C	10th (14)	9–2–15		Fifth round
2010	Tier 3	Kakkonen	Group C	1st (14)	16–3–7	Play-offs, runner-up	Third round
2011	Tier 3	Kakkonen	Group C	11th (14)	8–8–10		Fifth round
2012	Tier 3	Kakkonen	Northern Group	8th (9)	6–6–12	Relegated (due to bankruptcy)	Fifth round

As FC Santa Claus AC:

Year	Level	Division	Section	Position	Record	Movements	Finnish Cup
2013	Tier 4	Kolmonen	Northern Finland	3rd (12)	15–2–5		Third round
2014	Tier 4	Kolmonen	Northern Finland	1st (11)	16–2–2	Promoted	Did not enter
2015	Tier 3	Kakkonen	Northern Group	7th (10)	12–2–13		Did not enter
2016	Tier 3	Kakkonen	Northern Group	11th (12)	2–2–18	Relegated	Did not enter
2017	Tier 4	Kolmonen	Northern Finland	2nd (11)	15–3–2		Third round
2018	Tier 4	Kolmonen	Northern Finland	11th (11)	2–2–16	Relegated	Not eligible
2019	Tier 5	Nelonen	Northern Finland	11th (11)	3–3–14	Relegated	Not eligible
2020	Club did not enter a competitive division this season						

As FC Santa Claus:

Year	Level	Division	Section	Position	Record	Movements	Finnish Cup
2021	Tier 6	Vitonen	Northern Finland - Northern Block	5th (5)	3–1–8		Not eligible
2022	Tier 6	Vitonen	Northern Finland	2nd (9)	11–1–4		First round
2023	Tier 5	Nelonen	Northern Finland	5th (12); 5th (6)	6–1–4 (First stage); 1–0–4 (Promotion stage)		First round
2024	Tier 6 (Note: In 2024, a new second tier was established, pushing all the other divisions down one level)	Nelonen	Northern Finland	4th (11); 3rd (6)	6–1–3 (First stage); 2–0–3 (Promotion stage)		First round
2025	Tier 6	Nelonen	Northern Finland	2nd (10)	12–1–5	Promoted (Note: FC Santa Claus was promoted as a result of first place finishers Kainuun Ärjy declining promotion)	Third Round
2026	Tier 5	Kolmonen	Northern Finland	9th (10)	2–6–10		Third Round

== Notable former players ==
- (Canada) Tomer Chencinski
- (Nigeria) Raphael Edereho
- (Brazil) Ricardo Friedrich
- (Finland) Jyri Hietaharju
- (Finland) Janne Hietanen
- (Finland) Matti Hiukka
- (Finland) Tomas Hradecký
- (Finland) Akseli Kalermo
- (Finland) Juhani Kangas
- (Finland) Jarkko Lahdenmäki
- (Finland) Jarkko Luiro
- (Finland) Mika-Matti Maisonvaara
- (Finland) Joni Mäkelä
- (Finland) Jussi Niska
- (Ghana) Ransford Osei
- (Croatia) Vilim Posinković
- (Finland) Simo Roiha
- (Finland) Kari-Pekka Syväjärvi
- (Finland) Ville Syväjärvi
- (Finland) Tero Taipale
- (Nigeria) Emenike Uchenna Mbachu
- (Finland) Iiro Vanha
- (Finland) Miska Ylitolva
- (Finland) Jukka Yrjänheikki

== Reserve Team ==
In 2014, the club established a reserve team under the name FC Santa, which began play in the fifth tier Nelonen. In 2015, the club won the fifth tier, being promoted to the fourth tier Kolmonen for 2016. They were immediately relegated back to the fifth tier for 2017, where they once again won the division and promotion. However, they ended the operation of the second team after 2017, as the reserves reached the same level as the senior team.

The following includes the historical season results for FC Santa:

Year	Level	Division	Section	Position	Record	Movements	Finnish Cup
2014	Tier 5	Nelonen	Northern Finland - Lapland	5th (8)	5–5–4		Not eligible
2015	Tier 5	Nelonen	Northern Finland - Lapland	1st (8)	11–2–1	Promoted	Did not enter
2016	Tier 4	Kolmonen	Northern Finland	11th (12)	6–0–12	Auto-Relegation (Note: The first team was relegated to the fourth tier, therefore forcing the automatic relegation of the second team to the fifth tier)	Did not enter
2017	Tier 5	Nelonen	Northern Finland - North Group	1st (5)	9–2–1	Unable to Promote (Note: The reserves earned promotion, but were unable to promote due to the first team being in the fourth tier, they ceased operations after the season)	Did not enter
2018-2023	Reserves stopped operating						
2024	Tier 7	Vitonen	Northern Finland - North Group	3rd (9)	9–1–6		Not eligible
2025	Tier 7	Vitonen	Northern Finland - North Group - Group B	1st (8)	12–0–2	Lost promotion playoffs (Note: Following the withdrawal of Oulun Palloseura, it opened up an extra spot allowing FC Santa Claus B to be promoted)	First round
2026	Tier 7	Vitonen	Northern Finland - North Group - Group B	3rd (8)	7–2–5		Preliminary round

== Honours ==
First Team

- Kakkonen (III) Division Title - 2010
- Kolmonen (IV) Division Title - 2001, 2008, 2014
- Midnattsolscupen Cup - 1994

Reserve Team

- Nelonen (V) Division Title - 2015, 2017

== Women ==
FC Santa Claus AC formed a women's team in 2016. They began play in the Naisten Kolmonen, the women's fourth tier. They finished in 7th place in their division in 2016 and 5th place in 2017. They did not play in 2018. The reformed club announced they will be re-introducing a women's club.

as FC Santa Claus AC

Year	Level	Division	Section	Position	Record	Movements
2016	Tier 4	Naisten Kolmonen	Northern Finland	7th (10)	4–4–10	
2017	Tier 4	Naisten Kolmonen	Northern Finland	5th (8)	5–2–7	
2018	Women stopped operating					

as FC Santa Claus

Year	Level	Division	Section	Position	Record	Movements
2023	Tier 4	Naisten Kolmonen	Northern Finland	10th (11); 4th (5)	1–2–7 (First stage); 1-2-1 (Second stage)	
2024	Tier 4	Naisten Kolmonen	Northern Finland	6th (7)	3–0–9	
2025	Women dropped to an 8v8 league					

== Juniors ==

FC Santa Claus Juniorit was formed in 1994 under the name FC Lynx. In 2013, they became known as FC Santa Claus Juniorit after partnering with the two Rovaniemi clubs, RoPS and FC Santa Claus AC. They operate youth teams at every age group.

Beginning in 2017, the Junior club established a partnership with Football Development Schools and English Premier League club West Bromwich Albion.

Every summer, they host the Santa Claus Cup which attracts teams from several countries, for both boys and girls teams.
