= Akseli Kalermo =

Finnish footballer (born 1997)

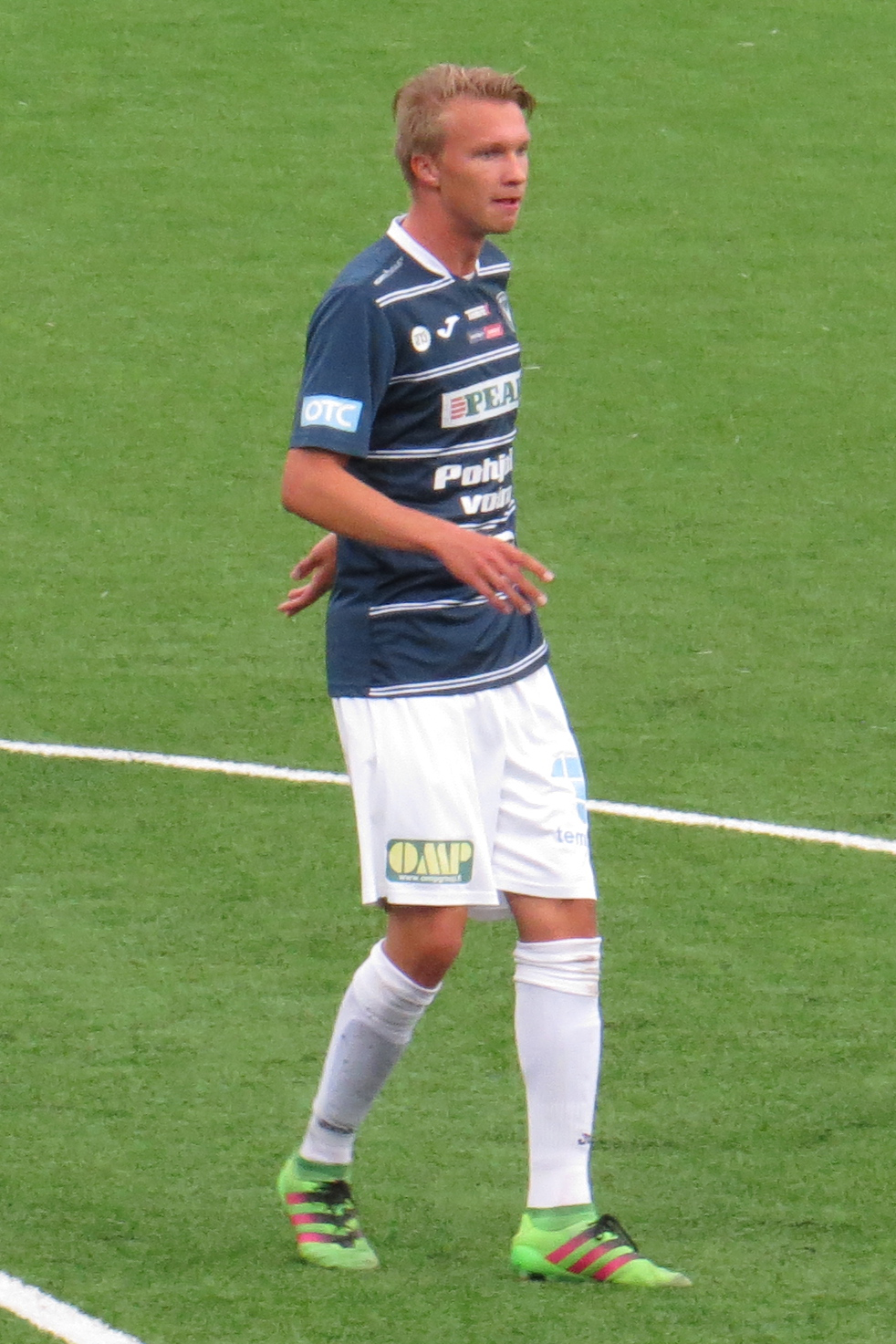
- Kalermo with AC Oulu in 2016

Personal information
- Full name: Akseli Matias Kalermo
- Date of birth: 17 March 1997 (age 29)
- Place of birth: Kannus, Finland
- Height: 1.90 m (6 ft 3 in)
- Position: Centre back

Youth career
- OLS
- Tervarit
- 2013–2014: IF Brommapojkarna
- 2014–2015: Atalanta

Senior career*
Years	Team	Apps	(Gls)
2015–2016	RoPS	6	(0)
2015	→ FC Santa Claus (loan)	7	(0)
2016	→ FC Santa Claus (loan)	3	(0)
2016–2017	AC Oulu	31	(0)
2018	VPS	1	(0)
2018	→ AC Kajaani (loan)	2	(0)
2019	Brattvåg IL	11	(1)
2020–2022	FK Riteriai	66	(0)
2023	Þór Akureyri	19	(0)

International career
2013	Finland U17	4	(0)
2015	Finland U19	2	(0)
- * Club domestic league appearances and goals as of 6 March 2024

Akseli Matias Kalermo (born 17 March 1997) is a Finnish former professional footballer who played as a defender.

== Career ==
As a youth player, Kalermo joined the youth academy of Atalanta.

Kalermo signed with Brattvåg IL for the 2019 season.

In June 2020 he moved to Lithuanian club FK Riteriai.

== Career statistics ==
Appearances and goals by club, season and competition
Club	Season	League			Cup (Note: Includes Suomen Cup, Norwegian Football Cup, Lithuanian Cup and Icelandic Men's Football Cup)		League cup (Note: Includes Finnish League Cup and Icelandic Men's Football League Cup)		Europe		Total	
Club	Season	Division	Apps	Goals	Apps	Goals	Apps	Goals	Apps	Goals	Apps	Goals
AC Oulu	2012	Ykkönen	0	0	0	0	–		–		0	0
RoPS	2015	Veikkausliiga	0	0	0	0	0	0	–		0	0
RoPS	2016	Veikkausliiga	6	0	1	0	4	0	0	0	11	0
RoPS	Total		6	0	1	0	4	0	0	0	11	0
FC Santa Claus (loan)	2015	Kakkonen	7	0	–		–		–		7	0
FC Santa Claus (loan)	2016	Kakkonen	3	0	–		–		–		3	0
FC Santa Claus (loan)	Total		10	0	0	0	0	0	0	0	10	0
AC Oulu	2016	Ykkönen	7	0	–		–		–		7	0
AC Oulu	2017	Ykkönen	24	0	3	0	–		–		27	0
AC Oulu	Total		31	0	3	0	0	0	0	0	34	0
VPS	2018	Veikkausliiga	1	0	1	0	–		–		2	0
VPS Akatemia	2018	Kolmonen	4	0	–		–		–		4	0
AC Kajaani (loan)	2018	Ykkönen	2	0	–		–		–		2	0
Brattvåg	2019	2. divisjon	11	1	1	0	–		–		12	1
Brattvåg 2	2019	4. divisjon	4	1	–		–		–		4	1
Riteriai	2020	A Lyga	8	0	0	0	–		1 (Note: Appearance(s) in UEFA Europa League)	0	9	0
Riteriai	2021	A Lyga	29	0	1	0	–		–		30	0
Riteriai	2022	A Lyga	29	0	3	0	–		–		32	0
Riteriai	Total		66	0	4	0	0	0	0	0	70	0
Þór Akureyri	2023	1. deild karla	19	0	3	0	3	0	–		25	0
Career total			154	2	13	0	7	0	1	0	175	2

== Honours ==
- Football Association of Finland: Boy Player of the Year 2013
