= Kari-Pekka Syväjärvi =

Finnish footballer (born 1987)

Personal information
- Date of birth: 26 November 1987 (age 38)
- Place of birth: Finland
- Height: 1.83 m (6 ft 0 in)
- Position: Goalkeeper

Senior career*
Years	Team	Apps	(Gls)
2008–2009	RoPS	10	(0)
2010–2012	FC Santa Claus	49	(0)
2015	FC Santa Claus	6	(0)
- * Club domestic league appearances and goals as of 14 October 2009

Kari-Pekka Syväjärvi (born 26 November 1987) is a Finnish former footballer.
