= Mika-Matti Maisonvaara =

Finnish footballer (born 1991)

Personal information
- Date of birth: 11 March 1991 (age 35)
- Place of birth: Finland
- Height: 1.80 m (5 ft 11 in)
- Positions: Left back; left midfielder

Team information
- Current team: RoPS
- Number: 15

Youth career
- RoPS

Senior career*
Years	Team	Apps	(Gls)
2007–2010	RoPS	34	(1)
2007	→ FC Lynx Napapiiri (loan)	?	(?)
2008	→ RoPS Farmi	12	(3)
2011	FC Santa Claus	22	(2)
2011	→ RoPS (loan)	3	(0)
2012–	RoPS	26	(0)
- * Club domestic league appearances and goals as of 29 September 2010

Mika-Matti Maisonvaara (born 11 March 1991) is a Finnish football player currently playing for HIFK Fotboll. Playing mainly as a left midfielder, Maisonvaara can also play as full-back. He is technical player and can be utilized as a dead-ball specialist. He scored his first league goal from penalty spot against JJK on 1 July 2009.
