= 2008 Kolmonen – Finnish League Division 3 =

Finnish League Division 3
- Season: 2008
- Champions: Honka 2; Futura; Kiffen; Kultsu FC; FCV; FC Santa Claus; Virkiä; FC Jazz-J; PJK; TuTo (not promoted)
- Promoted: 9 teams above

League tables for teams participating in Kolmonen, the fourth tier of the Finnish soccer league system, in 2008.

== League Tables 2008 ==
=== Helsinki and Uusimaa ===
==== Section 1 ====
Pos	Team	Pld	W	D	L	GF	GA	GD	Pts	Qualification
1	Honka 2	22	18	2	2	91	11	+80	56	Play-offs
2	BK-46	22	16	4	2	63	25	+38	52	
3	EBK	22	12	5	5	59	36	+23	41	
4	FC HIK	22	12	3	7	73	37	+36	39	
5	NuPS	22	11	2	9	52	45	+7	35	
6	PPV	22	10	3	9	46	37	+9	33	
7	EsPa	22	9	1	12	47	45	+2	28	
8	Zyklon/Populus	22	8	4	10	45	69	−24	28	
9	KyIF FCK1	22	7	4	11	44	66	−22	25	
10	FC Espoo 2	22	6	3	13	46	64	−18	21	
11	PuiU 3	22	5	2	15	37	73	−36	17	
12	Gnistan Ogeli	22	0	3	19	26	121	−95	3	

==== Section 2 ====
Pos	Team	Pld	W	D	L	GF	GA	GD	Pts	Qualification
1	Futura	22	18	1	3	71	28	+43	55	Play-offs
2	Spartak	22	13	4	5	71	31	+40	43	
3	Ponnistus	22	12	4	6	61	36	+25	40	
4	MPS	22	11	2	9	47	40	+7	35	
5	FC Viikingit/2	22	10	4	8	37	34	+3	34	
6	MaKu	22	8	3	11	37	52	−15	27	
7	VJS	22	8	3	11	45	69	−24	27	
8	Kasiysi PMP	22	7	5	10	32	40	−8	26	
9	Pöxyt	22	7	3	12	21	38	−17	24	
10	Allianssi Vantaa	22	6	5	11	36	47	−11	23	
11	FC POHU	22	5	6	11	36	49	−13	21	
12	Akilles	22	5	4	13	28	58	−30	19	

==== Section 3 ====
Pos	Team	Pld	W	D	L	GF	GA	GD	Pts	Qualification
1	Kiffen	22	18	2	2	61	15	+46	56	Play-offs
2	AC Vantaa	22	18	1	3	79	22	+57	55	
3	JäPS	22	15	2	5	64	25	+39	47	
4	SalReipas	22	11	7	4	54	27	+27	40	
5	PK-35/2	22	11	2	9	44	35	+9	35	
6	FC Degis	22	8	5	9	36	50	−14	29	
7	SAPA	22	6	8	8	37	39	−2	26	
8	OPedot	22	7	3	12	43	55	−12	24	
9	Stars	22	6	1	15	27	64	−37	19	
10	PuiU	22	4	5	13	24	48	−24	17	
11	MPS/2	22	3	5	14	31	67	−36	14	
12	RIlves	22	3	3	16	22	75	−53	12	

==== Play-offs ====
Pos	Team	Pld	W	D	L	GF	GA	GD	Pts	Promotion
1	Futura	2	1	1	0	4	2	+2	4	Promoted
2	FC Honka/2	2	1	1	0	2	1	+1	4	Promoted
3	Kiffen	2	0	1	1	1	2	−1	1	Promoted
4	TuTo	2	0	1	1	2	4	−2	1	

=== South-East Finland (Kaakkois-Suomi) ===
Pos	Team	Pld	W	D	L	GF	GA	GD	Pts	Promotion or relegation
1	Kultsu FC	22	15	4	3	56	24	+32	49	Promoted
2	PEPO	22	14	5	3	48	18	+30	47	
3	Purha	22	15	2	5	54	31	+23	47	
4	Sudet	22	13	5	4	57	22	+35	44	
5	MiKi	22	13	2	7	44	25	+19	41	
6	STPS	22	8	4	10	39	46	−7	28	
7	SavU	22	7	4	11	38	48	−10	25	
8	HaPK	22	7	3	12	27	46	−19	24	
9	VoPpK	22	5	2	15	27	54	−27	17	
10	SiU	22	4	2	16	35	64	−29	14	
11	FC Villisiat	22	2	3	17	20	64	−44	9	Relegated

=== Central (Keski-Suomi) ===
Pos	Team	Pld	W	D	L	GF	GA	GD	Pts	Qualification or relegation
1	FC Vaajakoski	18	14	2	2	65	16	+49	44	Playoffs
2	FC Keitelejazz, Äänekoski	18	13	1	4	64	27	+37	40	
3	BET, Jyväskylä	18	10	3	5	64	43	+21	33	
4	LPK, Jyväskylä	18	10	3	5	40	29	+11	33	Resigned to 4th Div.
5	JIlves, Jämsänkoski	18	8	5	5	47	29	+18	29	
6	JPS, Jyväskylä	18	7	3	8	47	31	+16	24	
7	KeuPa, Keuruu	18	7	2	9	44	53	−9	23	Relegation
8	PaRi, Jyväskylä	18	5	2	11	34	53	−19	17	Relegation, Resigned to 5th Div.
9	Huki, Jyväskylä	18	4	2	12	39	68	−29	14	Relegation
10	HPP, Haapamäki	18	0	1	17	16	111	−95	1	Relegation

=== Eastern Finland (Itä-Suomi) ===
Pos	Team	Pld	W	D	L	GF	GA	GD	Pts	Qualification or relegation
1	SC Riverball, Joensuu	21	16	3	2	82	13	+69	51	Playoffs
2	SC Zulimanit, Kuopio	21	13	4	4	58	19	+39	43	
3	PAVE, Iisalmi	21	13	2	6	39	32	+7	41	Resigned to 4th Div.
4	SC KuFu-98, Kuopio	21	7	4	10	33	37	−4	25	
5	JoPS, Joensuu	21	8	1	12	36	36	0	25	
6	JIPPO /2, Joensuu	21	7	3	11	24	41	−17	24	
7	LehPa-77, Kontiolahti	21	6	2	13	22	67	−45	20	Relegation
8	Warkaus JK /2	21	4	1	16	19	58	−39	13	Relegation

=== Northern Finland (Pohjois-Suomi) ===
Pos	Team	Pld	W	D	L	GF	GA	GD	Pts	Promotion or relegation
1	FC Santa Claus, Rovaniemi	20	15	3	2	54	14	+40	48	Promoted
2	AC Kajaani, Kajaani	20	14	0	6	64	18	+46	42	
3	KajHa, Kajaani	20	13	2	5	61	22	+39	41	
4	FC Muurola, Rovaniemi	20	10	3	7	42	31	+11	33	
5	OuTa, Oulu	20	9	5	6	35	30	+5	32	
6	Tervarit, Oulu	20	10	2	8	34	37	−3	32	
7	HauPa, Haukipudas	20	7	2	11	34	45	−11	23	
8	FC Lynx, Rovaniemi	20	6	5	9	26	37	−11	23	
9	TP-47/2, Tornio	20	6	2	12	33	47	−14	20	
10	OLS/A, Oulu	20	2	7	11	20	50	−30	13	
11	RoPS Farmi, Rovaniemi	20	1	3	16	13	85	−72	6	Relegated

=== Central Ostrobothnia and Vaasa (Keski-Pohjanmaa and Vaasa) ===
==== Keski-Pohjanmaa - Spring ====
Pos	Team	Pld	W	D	L	GF	GA	GD	Pts	Qualification
1	Öja-73	10	9	1	0	31	5	+26	28	Upper Section - Autumn
2	NIK	10	7	1	2	25	13	+12	22	Upper Section - Autumn
3	KP-V	10	5	3	2	31	19	+12	18	Upper Section - Autumn
4	IK Myran	10	5	1	4	18	18	0	16	Upper Section - Autumn
5	Reima	10	4	3	3	22	18	+4	15	Upper Section - Autumn
6	Esse IK	10	4	2	4	21	16	+5	14	Upper Section - Autumn
7	FC YPA II	10	4	2	4	20	26	−6	14	
8	No Stars	10	4	1	5	17	28	−11	13	
9	GBK II	10	3	1	6	17	23	−6	10	
10	LoVe	10	2	0	8	16	31	−15	6	
11	FF Jaro II	10	0	1	9	5	26	−21	1	

==== Vaasa - Spring ====
Pos	Team	Pld	W	D	L	GF	GA	GD	Pts	Qualification
1	Sporting	11	8	1	2	31	11	+20	25	Upper Section - Autumn
2	FC Korsholm	11	6	2	3	25	22	+3	20	Upper Section - Autumn
3	Virkiä	11	6	1	4	34	19	+15	19	Upper Section - Autumn
4	FC Kuffen	11	5	4	2	18	13	+5	19	Upper Section - Autumn
5	IK	11	5	3	3	20	21	−1	18	Upper Section - Autumn
6	FC KOMU	11	5	2	4	21	20	+1	17	Upper Section - Autumn
7	VIFK Young Boys	11	5	1	5	27	19	+8	16	
8	VäVi	11	4	2	5	15	19	−4	14	
9	TePa	11	4	1	6	21	29	−8	13	
10	FC Kiisto a-team	11	3	2	6	26	33	−7	11	
11	Karhu	11	3	1	7	14	22	−8	10	
12	NuPa	11	2	0	9	14	38	−24	6	

==== Upper Section - Autumn ====
Pos	Team	Pld	W	D	L	GF	GA	GD	Pts	Promotion
1	Virkiä	11	8	1	2	41	13	+28	25	Promoted
2	Öja-73	11	8	1	2	23	17	+6	25	
3	FC Korsholm	11	7	2	2	28	15	+13	23	
4	Reima	11	6	2	3	28	16	+12	20	
5	Sporting	11	6	1	4	30	21	+9	19	
6	NIK	11	4	3	4	14	14	0	15	
7	FC KOMU	11	4	2	5	22	27	−5	14	
8	KP-V	11	3	4	4	18	24	−6	13	
9	FC Kuffen	11	3	1	7	18	23	−5	10	
10	IK	11	3	1	7	8	27	−19	10	
11	IK Myran	11	3	0	8	10	27	−17	9	
12	Esse IK	11	1	2	8	11	27	−16	5	

=== Satakunta ===
Pos	Team	Pld	W	D	L	GF	GA	GD	Pts	Promotion or relegation
1	FC Jazz-J	18	15	1	2	65	20	+45	46	Promoted
2	MuSa1	18	14	3	1	45	13	+32	45	
3	EuPa	18	12	4	2	39	15	+24	40	
4	FC Rauma	18	9	3	6	35	26	+9	30	
5	P-Iirot Reservi	18	7	3	8	38	37	+1	24	
6	RuosV	18	7	1	10	25	34	−9	22	
7	TOVE	18	6	2	10	40	48	−8	20	
8	PoPa Futsal	18	4	2	12	19	45	−26	14	
9	FC Ulvila	18	3	2	13	29	58	−29	11	
10	MuSa2	18	2	1	15	23	62	−39	7	Relegated

=== Tampere ===
Pos	Team	Pld	W	D	L	GF	GA	GD	Pts	Promotion or relegation
1	PJK	22	18	3	1	84	12	+72	57	Promoted
2	NoPS	22	18	2	2	66	16	+50	56	
3	Härmä	22	13	2	7	55	36	+19	41	
4	FC Tigers	22	10	5	7	42	31	+11	35	
5	Loiske	22	9	4	9	37	46	−9	31	
6	TP-49	22	9	3	10	44	50	−6	30	
7	Pato	22	8	4	10	34	35	−1	28	
8	PS-44	22	8	3	11	43	53	−10	27	
9	VaKP	22	8	2	12	37	52	−15	26	
10	NoPy	22	6	5	11	33	57	−24	23	Relegation Playoffs - Relegated
11	Sopu	22	5	1	16	30	64	−34	16	Relegated
12	FC Vapsi	22	2	2	18	16	69	−53	8	Relegated

=== Turku and Åland (Turku and Ahvenanmaa) ===
Pos	Team	Pld	W	D	L	GF	GA	GD	Pts	Qualification or relegation
1	TuTo	22	18	2	2	72	14	+58	56	Play-offs
2	TPK	22	13	4	5	48	24	+24	43	
3	Masku	22	13	4	5	46	33	+13	43	
4	LTU	22	11	5	6	64	45	+19	38	
5	FC Boda	22	11	2	9	33	25	+8	35	
6	SoVo	22	10	2	10	45	40	+5	32	
7	Wilpas	22	9	4	9	25	28	−3	31	
8	JyTy	22	7	5	10	36	48	−12	26	
9	PIF	22	8	2	12	32	48	−16	26	
10	KaaPo 2	22	5	6	11	27	53	−26	21	
11	VG-62	22	4	4	14	27	57	−30	16	Relegated
12	SCR	22	1	4	17	28	68	−40	0 (Note: Points expunged)	Relegated

== References and sources ==
- Finnish FA
- ResultCode
- Kolmonen (jalkapallo) (in Finnish)
