= Ville Syväjärvi =

Finnish footballer (born 1983)

Personal information
- Date of birth: 23 June 1983 (age 43)
- Place of birth: Rovaniemi, Finland
- Height: 1.74 m (5 ft 8 1/2 in)
- Position: Defender

Team information
- Current team: RoPS
- Number: 17

Youth career
- 1995–2003: RoPS

Senior career*
Years	Team	Apps	(Gls)
2003–2006	RoPS	48	(0)
2004	→ YPA (loan)	2	(0)
2007	SoVo	20	(0)
2008	Santa Claus	18	(0)
2009	RoPS	16	(0)
2010	Santa Claus	23	(1)
2011	RoPS	13	(0)
2011	→ Santa Claus (loan)	2	(0)
2012	Santa Claus	16	(0)
2013	RoPo	12	(1)
2014	Övertorneå SK	16	(0)
2015–	RoPo	17	(0)
- * Club domestic league appearances and goals as of 14 October 2009

Ville Syväjärvi (born 23 June 1983) is a Finnish footballer playing for Rovaniemen Palloseura (RoPS) in Rovaniemi.
