= Jukka Yrjänheikki =

Finnish footballer (born 1988)

Personal information
- Full name: Jukka Samuli Yrjänheikki
- Date of birth: 23 September 1988 (age 38)
- Place of birth: Rovaniemi, Finland
- Height: 1.82 m (5 ft 11 1/2 in)
- Position: Defensive midfielder

Youth career
- RoPS

Senior career*
Years	Team	Apps	(Gls)
2006–2009	RoPS	11	(0)
2006–2007	→ FC Lynx (loan)	14	(1)
2008	RoPS Farmi	10	(0)
2009	RoPS	8	(0)
2010–2011	PS Kemi	26	(1)
2012	RoPS	12	(0)
2013	PS Kemi	24	(0)
2014–2015	FC Santa Claus	32	(6)
2017	RoPo	42	(6)
- * Club domestic league appearances and goals

Jukka Samuli Yrjänheikki (born 23 September 1988) is a Finnish football player currently playing for Rovaniemen Palloseura.

== Career ==
Jukka made his first professional contract for Rovaniemen Palloseura in 2006. In 2006 and 2007 he also played for FC Lynx in the Finnish second division. He played in 2009 for Rovaniemen Palloseura in eight games in the Veikkausliiga, before signing for PS Kemi Kings.

In 2010 and 2011 he played for PS Kemi Kings in the Finnish first division. He signed a one-year contract for RoPS in March 2012 and won Champion of Finnish first division. In 2014 Yrjänheikki was captain of FC Santa Claus and they promoted to Finnish second division, Kakkonen.
