= 2005 Kolmonen – Finnish League Division 3 =

Finnish League Division 3
- Season: 2005
- Champions: LoPa; City Stars; MPS; KTP; JJK Jyväskylä II; Zulimanit; FC Lynx; Norrvalla FF; FC Rauma; PS-44; TuTo
- Promoted: MPS; JJK Jyväskylä II; FC Lynx; PS-44

League tables for teams participating in Kolmonen, the fourth tier of the Finnish soccer league system, in 2005.

== League tables ==
=== Helsinki and Uusimaa ===
==== Section 1 ====
| Pos | Team | Pld | W | D | L | GF | GA | GD | Pts | Qualification or relegation |
|---|---|---|---|---|---|---|---|---|---|---|
| 1 | LoPa, Lohja | 22 | 16 | 3 | 3 | 63 | 22 | +41 | 51 | Promotion Playoff Group A |
| 2 | FC HIK, Hanko | 22 | 16 | 2 | 4 | 73 | 20 | +53 | 50 | |
| 3 | Kiffen, Helsinki | 22 | 13 | 6 | 3 | 62 | 26 | +36 | 45 | |
| 4 | EBK, Espoo | 22 | 12 | 2 | 8 | 64 | 37 | +27 | 38 | |
| 5 | FC Espoo 2 | 22 | 10 | 3 | 9 | 43 | 43 | 0 | 33 | |
| 6 | Gnistan Ogeli, Helsinki | 22 | 9 | 4 | 9 | 45 | 42 | +3 | 31 | |
| 7 | MaKu, Helsinki | 22 | 8 | 6 | 8 | 43 | 34 | +9 | 30 | |
| 8 | Pöxyt, Espoo | 22 | 6 | 5 | 11 | 29 | 50 | −21 | 23 | |
| 9 | Kelohonka, Espoo | 22 | 6 | 4 | 12 | 32 | 49 | −17 | 22 | |
| 10 | PMP, Espoo | 22 | 5 | 6 | 11 | 36 | 48 | −12 | 21 | |
| 11 | FCK Salamat 2, Kirkkonummi | 22 | 5 | 3 | 14 | 36 | 82 | −46 | 18 | Relegated |
| 12 | EIF 2, Tammisaari | 22 | 3 | 2 | 17 | 26 | 99 | −73 | 11 | Relegated |

==== Section 2 ====
| Pos | Team | Pld | W | D | L | GF | GA | GD | Pts | Qualification or relegation |
|---|---|---|---|---|---|---|---|---|---|---|
| 1 | City Stars, Lahti | 22 | 20 | 1 | 1 | 101 | 23 | +78 | 61 | Promotion Playoff Group A |
| 2 | FC Futura, Porvoo | 22 | 19 | 1 | 2 | 133 | 26 | +107 | 58 | |
| 3 | RIlves, Riihimäki | 22 | 13 | 2 | 7 | 59 | 37 | +22 | 41 | |
| 4 | JäPS, Järvenpää | 22 | 12 | 0 | 10 | 65 | 43 | +22 | 36 | |
| 5 | TuPS, Tuusula | 22 | 12 | 0 | 10 | 62 | 50 | +12 | 36 | |
| 6 | Pato, Tervakoski | 22 | 10 | 3 | 9 | 54 | 48 | +6 | 33 | |
| 7 | NJS, Nurmijärvi | 22 | 10 | 2 | 10 | 59 | 66 | −7 | 32 | |
| 8 | JJ Vepo, Helsinki | 22 | 9 | 1 | 12 | 46 | 55 | −9 | 28 | |
| 9 | KP-75, Kerava | 22 | 7 | 3 | 12 | 39 | 61 | −22 | 24 | |
| 10 | Kiffen 2, Helsinki | 22 | 5 | 3 | 14 | 28 | 82 | −54 | 18 | |
| 11 | SUMU, Helsinki | 22 | 3 | 3 | 16 | 30 | 84 | −54 | 12 | Relegated |
| 12 | Zyklon, Helsinki | 22 | 2 | 1 | 19 | 28 | 129 | −101 | 7 | Relegated |

==== Section 3 ====
| Pos | Team | Pld | W | D | L | GF | GA | GD | Pts | Qualification or relegation |
|---|---|---|---|---|---|---|---|---|---|---|
| 1 | MPS, Helsinki | 22 | 18 | 3 | 1 | 113 | 23 | +90 | 57 | Promotion Playoff Group A |
| 2 | TiPS, Vantaa | 22 | 14 | 3 | 5 | 87 | 39 | +48 | 45 | |
| 3 | PuiU, Helsinki | 22 | 14 | 2 | 6 | 55 | 38 | +17 | 44 | |
| 4 | SAPA, Helsinki | 22 | 12 | 2 | 8 | 49 | 47 | +2 | 38 | |
| 5 | PPV, Helsinki | 22 | 12 | 1 | 9 | 75 | 44 | +31 | 37 | |
| 6 | AC Vantaa | 22 | 11 | 1 | 10 | 55 | 50 | +5 | 34 | |
| 7 | FC POHU, Helsinki | 22 | 10 | 3 | 9 | 54 | 40 | +14 | 33 | |
| 8 | VALO, Vantaa | 22 | 9 | 3 | 10 | 50 | 74 | −24 | 30 | |
| 9 | RoU, Helsinki | 22 | 6 | 3 | 13 | 34 | 67 | −33 | 21 | |
| 10 | VJS, Vantaa | 22 | 6 | 2 | 14 | 35 | 85 | −50 | 20 | |
| 11 | KOPSE, Vantaa | 22 | 5 | 3 | 14 | 35 | 71 | −36 | 18 | Relegated |
| 12 | RiRa, Vantaa | 22 | 1 | 2 | 19 | 21 | 85 | −64 | 5 | Relegated |

=== South-East Finland, Kaakkois-Suomi ===
| Pos | Team | Pld | W | D | L | GF | GA | GD | Pts | Qualification or relegation |
|---|---|---|---|---|---|---|---|---|---|---|
| 1 | KTP, Kotka | 22 | 19 | 1 | 2 | 69 | 17 | +52 | 58 | Promotion Playoff Group C |
| 2 | FC Pantterit, Joutseno | 22 | 17 | 1 | 4 | 80 | 20 | +60 | 52 | |
| 3 | SavU, Mikkeli | 22 | 11 | 5 | 6 | 49 | 32 | +17 | 38 | |
| 4 | STPS, Savonlinna | 22 | 10 | 4 | 8 | 58 | 31 | +27 | 34 | |
| 5 | FC KooTeePee 2, Kotka | 22 | 8 | 7 | 7 | 54 | 38 | +16 | 31 | |
| 6 | PEPO, Lappeenranta | 22 | 8 | 6 | 8 | 32 | 38 | −6 | 30 | |
| 7 | HaPK, Hamina | 22 | 8 | 5 | 9 | 25 | 47 | −22 | 29 | |
| 8 | VoPpK, Voikkaa | 22 | 7 | 7 | 8 | 28 | 40 | −12 | 28 | |
| 9 | SiU, Simpele | 22 | 7 | 1 | 14 | 33 | 63 | −30 | 22 | |
| 10 | HP-47, Heinola | 22 | 6 | 4 | 12 | 23 | 56 | −33 | 22 | |
| 11 | HiHa, Hiirola | 22 | 6 | 1 | 15 | 27 | 55 | −28 | 19 | Relegation Playoff |
| 12 | Fc PaSa, Imatra | 22 | 2 | 4 | 16 | 16 | 57 | −41 | 10 | Relegated |

==== Relegation playoff ====
First Leg

Purha 0-0 HiHa

Second Leg

HiHa 2-7 Purha

Purha promoted, HiHa relegated.

=== Central Finland, Keski-Suomi ===
| Pos | Team | Pld | W | D | L | GF | GA | GD | Pts | Qualification or relegation |
|---|---|---|---|---|---|---|---|---|---|---|
| 1 | JJK Jyväskylä II | 18 | 14 | 4 | 0 | 59 | 16 | +43 | 46 | Promotion Playoff Group C |
| 2 | JIlves, Jämsänkoski | 18 | 11 | 2 | 5 | 59 | 29 | +30 | 35 | |
| 3 | HuKi, Jyväskylä | 18 | 10 | 3 | 5 | 56 | 36 | +20 | 33 | |
| 4 | PaRi, Palokka | 18 | 9 | 3 | 6 | 44 | 39 | +5 | 30 | |
| 5 | Huima II, Äänekoski | 18 | 7 | 5 | 6 | 47 | 45 | +2 | 26 | |
| 6 | BET, Jyväskylä | 18 | 8 | 2 | 8 | 46 | 46 | 0 | 26 | |
| 7 | Pamaus, Laukaa | 18 | 7 | 3 | 8 | 53 | 57 | −4 | 24 | |
| 8 | LPK, Jyväskylä | 18 | 6 | 4 | 8 | 23 | 35 | −12 | 22 | |
| 9 | JPS, Jyväskylä | 18 | 1 | 4 | 13 | 18 | 43 | −25 | 7 | Relegation Playoff |
| 10 | KeuPa, Keuruu | 18 | 1 | 2 | 15 | 26 | 85 | −59 | 5 | Relegated |

==== Relegation playoff ====
First Leg

FCV/Reds 2-2 JPS

Second Leg

JPS 3-0 FCV/Reds

JPS remain at fourth level.

=== Eastern Finland, Itä-Suomi ===
| Pos | Team | Pld | W | D | L | GF | GA | GD | Pts | Qualification or relegation |
|---|---|---|---|---|---|---|---|---|---|---|
| 1 | Zulimanit, Kuopio | 22 | 14 | 5 | 3 | 64 | 31 | +33 | 47 | Withdrew from Playoff |
| 2 | SiPS, Siilinjärvi | 22 | 14 | 4 | 4 | 49 | 34 | +15 | 46 | Promotion Playoff Group C |
| 3 | JoPS, Joensuu | 22 | 10 | 5 | 7 | 48 | 34 | +14 | 35 | |
| 4 | SaPa, Pieksämäki | 22 | 10 | 4 | 8 | 40 | 33 | +7 | 34 | |
| 5 | SC KuFu-98, Kuopio | 22 | 9 | 5 | 8 | 38 | 33 | +5 | 32 | |
| 6 | PK-37, Iisalmi | 22 | 9 | 5 | 8 | 35 | 35 | 0 | 32 | |
| 7 | PAVE, Iisalmi | 22 | 9 | 2 | 11 | 34 | 42 | −8 | 29 | |
| 8 | LehPa, Kontiolahti | 22 | 8 | 4 | 10 | 36 | 34 | +2 | 28 | |
| 9 | Warkaus JK 2 | 22 | 8 | 4 | 10 | 32 | 40 | −8 | 28 | |
| 10 | KiuPa, Kiuruvesi | 22 | 7 | 3 | 12 | 38 | 45 | −7 | 24 | Relegated |
| 11 | PK-37 2, Iisalmi | 22 | 7 | 2 | 13 | 36 | 58 | −22 | 23 | Relegated |
| 12 | SuPa, Suonenjoki | 22 | 5 | 1 | 16 | 25 | 56 | −31 | 16 | Relegated |

NB: Zulimanit withdrew from Promotion Playoff and SiPS took their place.

=== Northern Finland, Pohjois-Suomi ===
| Pos | Team | Pld | W | D | L | GF | GA | GD | Pts | Qualification or relegation |
|---|---|---|---|---|---|---|---|---|---|---|
| 1 | FC Lynx, Rovaniemi | 18 | 14 | 4 | 0 | 58 | 11 | +47 | 46 | Promotion Playoff Group D |
| 2 | FC Rio Grande, Rovaniemi | 18 | 12 | 3 | 3 | 52 | 24 | +28 | 39 | |
| 3 | FC Raahe | 18 | 8 | 7 | 3 | 50 | 24 | +26 | 31 | |
| 4 | FC Tarmo, Kajaani | 18 | 9 | 3 | 6 | 50 | 36 | +14 | 30 | |
| 5 | FC Santa Claus, Rovaniemi | 18 | 9 | 3 | 6 | 42 | 36 | +6 | 30 | |
| 6 | HauPa, Haukipudas | 18 | 8 | 1 | 9 | 30 | 30 | 0 | 25 | |
| 7 | FC Kurenpojat, Pudasjärvi | 18 | 5 | 4 | 9 | 38 | 49 | −11 | 19 | |
| 8 | Kontio, Kolari | 18 | 4 | 3 | 11 | 19 | 56 | −37 | 15 | |
| 9 | FC-88, Kemi | 18 | 2 | 4 | 12 | 23 | 65 | −42 | 10 | Relegated |
| 10 | ToTa, Tornio | 18 | 1 | 4 | 13 | 20 | 51 | −31 | 7 | Relegated |

=== Central Ostrobothnia, Keski-Pohjanmaa ===
==== Preliminary stage ====
| Pos | Team | Pld | W | D | L | GF | GA | GD | Pts | Qualification |
|---|---|---|---|---|---|---|---|---|---|---|
| 1 | Öja-73 | 10 | 5 | 4 | 1 | 27 | 10 | +17 | 19 | Promotion Playoff |
| 2 | PsInto, Pietarsaari | 10 | 6 | 1 | 3 | 19 | 14 | +5 | 19 | Promotion Playoff |
| 3 | GBK II, Kokkola | 10 | 5 | 2 | 3 | 21 | 19 | +2 | 17 | Promotion Playoff |
| 4 | NIK, Uusikaarlepyy | 10 | 5 | 2 | 3 | 15 | 14 | +1 | 17 | Promotion Playoff |
| 5 | Esse IK | 10 | 5 | 2 | 3 | 16 | 18 | −2 | 17 | Promotion Playoff |
| 6 | Jaro II, Pietarsaari | 10 | 5 | 1 | 4 | 35 | 18 | +17 | 16 | Promotion Playoff |
| 7 | IK Myran, Alaveteli | 10 | 4 | 2 | 4 | 18 | 18 | 0 | 14 | Relegation Playoff |
| 8 | KPS, Kokkola | 10 | 4 | 1 | 5 | 23 | 18 | +5 | 13 | Relegation Playoff |
| 9 | OuHu, Oulainen | 10 | 4 | 1 | 5 | 15 | 40 | −25 | 13 | Relegation Playoff |
| 10 | Reima, Kokkola | 10 | 1 | 2 | 7 | 14 | 23 | −9 | 5 | Relegation Playoff |
| 11 | PeFF, Pedersöre | 10 | 1 | 2 | 7 | 10 | 21 | −11 | 5 | Relegation Playoff |

NB: LoVe withdrew before the start of the season.

==== Relegation playoff Group ====
| Pos | Team | Pld | W | D | L | GF | GA | GD | Pts | Qualification |
|---|---|---|---|---|---|---|---|---|---|---|
| 7 | KPS, Kokkola | 18 | 8 | 3 | 7 | 47 | 32 | +15 | 27 | |
| 8 | OuHu, Oulainen | 18 | 7 | 1 | 10 | 25 | 64 | −39 | 22 | |
| 9 | IK Myran, Alaveteli | 18 | 5 | 6 | 7 | 31 | 38 | −7 | 21 | |
| 10 | PeFF, Pedersöre | 18 | 5 | 4 | 9 | 37 | 36 | +1 | 19 | |
| 11 | Reima, Kokkola | 18 | 3 | 6 | 9 | 26 | 36 | −10 | 15 | Relegation Playoff |

(preliminary stage points included)

==== Relegation playoff ====
First Leg

HBK 0-4 Reima

Second Leg

Reima 5-2 HBK

Reima remain at fourth level.

=== Vaasa ===
==== Preliminary stage ====
| Pos | Team | Pld | W | D | L | GF | GA | GD | Pts | Qualification |
|---|---|---|---|---|---|---|---|---|---|---|
| 1 | FC KOMU, Mustasaari | 10 | 7 | 1 | 2 | 24 | 11 | +13 | 22 | Promotion Playoff |
| 2 | Norrvalla FF, Vöyri | 10 | 6 | 2 | 2 | 32 | 12 | +20 | 20 | Promotion Playoff |
| 3 | VPS Juniorit, Vaasa | 10 | 5 | 3 | 2 | 15 | 10 | +5 | 18 | Promotion Playoff |
| 4 | TePa, Teuva | 10 | 4 | 3 | 3 | 21 | 21 | 0 | 15 | Promotion Playoff |
| 5 | Sporting, Kristiinankaupunki | 10 | 4 | 2 | 4 | 15 | 11 | +4 | 14 | Promotion Playoff |
| 6 | VPV, Vaasa | 10 | 4 | 2 | 4 | 13 | 15 | −2 | 14 | Promotion Playoff |
| 7 | NuPa, Nurmo | 10 | 4 | 2 | 4 | 14 | 17 | −3 | 14 | Relegation Playoff |
| 8 | IK, Ilmajoki | 10 | 3 | 4 | 3 | 15 | 17 | −2 | 13 | Relegation Playoff |
| 9 | Ponnistus, Lapua | 10 | 3 | 1 | 6 | 18 | 26 | −8 | 10 | Relegation Playoff |
| 10 | Karhu, Kauhajoki | 10 | 1 | 5 | 4 | 13 | 18 | −5 | 8 | Relegation Playoff |
| 11 | APV, Alavus | 10 | 1 | 1 | 8 | 8 | 30 | −22 | 4 | Relegation Playoff |

NB: PeIK withdrew before the start of the season.

==== Relegation playoff Group ====
| Pos | Team | Pld | W | D | L | GF | GA | GD | Pts | Relegation |
|---|---|---|---|---|---|---|---|---|---|---|
| 7 | Karhu, Kauhajoki | 8 | 5 | 2 | 1 | 28 | 11 | +17 | 25 | |
| 8 | NuPa, Nurmo | 8 | 3 | 1 | 4 | 19 | 27 | −8 | 24 | |
| 9 | IK, Ilmajoki | 8 | 2 | 2 | 4 | 16 | 21 | −5 | 21 | |
| 10 | Ponnistus, Lapua | 8 | 2 | 2 | 4 | 15 | 19 | −4 | 18 | |
| 11 | APV, Alavus | 8 | 4 | 1 | 3 | 23 | 23 | 0 | 17 | Relegated |

(preliminary stage points included)

=== Vaasa/Central Ostrobothnia Promotion Playoff Group ===
| Pos | Team | Pld | W | D | L | GF | GA | GD | Pts | Qualification |
|---|---|---|---|---|---|---|---|---|---|---|
| 1 | Norrvalla FF, Vöyri | 11 | 8 | 1 | 2 | 37 | 20 | +17 | 25 | Promotion Playoff Group D |
| 2 | Öja-73 | 11 | 8 | 1 | 2 | 34 | 20 | +14 | 25 | Withdrew from Playoff |
| 3 | NIK, Uusikaarlepyy | 11 | 7 | 2 | 2 | 18 | 8 | +10 | 23 | Promotion Playoff Group D |
| 4 | FC KOMU, Mustasaari | 11 | 7 | 1 | 3 | 37 | 24 | +13 | 22 | |
| 5 | GBK II, Kokkola | 11 | 5 | 2 | 4 | 27 | 20 | +7 | 17 | |
| 6 | Esse IK | 11 | 4 | 2 | 5 | 18 | 18 | 0 | 14 | |
| 7 | Sporting, Kristiinankaupunki | 11 | 4 | 2 | 5 | 14 | 23 | −9 | 14 | |
| 8 | Jaro II, Pietarsaari | 11 | 4 | 1 | 6 | 16 | 29 | −13 | 13 | |
| 9 | PsInto, Pietarsaari | 11 | 3 | 1 | 7 | 17 | 28 | −11 | 10 | |
| 10 | VPV, Vaasa | 11 | 3 | 1 | 7 | 14 | 27 | −13 | 10 | |
| 11 | TePa, Teuva | 11 | 2 | 3 | 6 | 23 | 29 | −6 | 9 | |
| 12 | VPS Juniorit, Vaasa | 11 | 1 | 3 | 7 | 17 | 26 | −9 | 6 | |

NB: Öja-73 withdrew from Promotion Playoff and NIK took their place.

=== Satakunta ===
| Pos | Team | Pld | W | D | L | GF | GA | GD | Pts | Qualification or relegation |
|---|---|---|---|---|---|---|---|---|---|---|
| 1 | FC Rauma | 20 | 17 | 3 | 0 | 92 | 18 | +74 | 54 | Promotion Playoff Group B |
| 2 | EuPa, Eura | 20 | 14 | 2 | 4 | 72 | 22 | +50 | 44 | |
| 3 | TOVE, Pori | 20 | 12 | 3 | 5 | 72 | 33 | +39 | 39 | |
| 4 | RuosV, Pori | 20 | 11 | 3 | 6 | 67 | 32 | +35 | 36 | |
| 5 | FC Rauma 2 | 20 | 9 | 2 | 9 | 62 | 69 | −7 | 29 | |
| 6 | Nasta, Nakkila | 20 | 8 | 4 | 8 | 52 | 55 | −3 | 28 | |
| 7 | VAlku, Ulvila | 20 | 8 | 4 | 8 | 44 | 50 | −6 | 28 | |
| 8 | MuSa 2, Pori | 20 | 8 | 3 | 9 | 51 | 46 | +5 | 27 | |
| 9 | RKV, Rauma | 20 | 3 | 5 | 12 | 34 | 60 | −26 | 14 | |
| 10 | MäKi, Pori | 20 | 1 | 4 | 15 | 31 | 97 | −66 | 7 | |
| 11 | KaPa, Kankaanpää | 20 | 2 | 1 | 17 | 27 | 122 | −95 | 7 | Relegated |

=== Tampere ===
| Pos | Team | Pld | W | D | L | GF | GA | GD | Pts | Qualification or relegation |
|---|---|---|---|---|---|---|---|---|---|---|
| 1 | PS-44, Valkeakoski | 22 | 19 | 2 | 1 | 82 | 21 | +61 | 59 | Promotion Playoff Group B |
| 2 | TP-49, Toijala | 22 | 16 | 2 | 4 | 77 | 27 | +50 | 50 | |
| 3 | Loiske, Lempäälä | 22 | 12 | 2 | 8 | 46 | 33 | +13 | 38 | |
| 4 | VaKP, Valkeakoski | 22 | 11 | 3 | 8 | 58 | 36 | +22 | 36 | |
| 5 | KaVo, Kangasala | 22 | 10 | 4 | 8 | 50 | 35 | +15 | 34 | |
| 6 | SIlves, Tampere | 22 | 9 | 5 | 8 | 41 | 44 | −3 | 32 | |
| 7 | PP-70 2, Tampere | 22 | 8 | 4 | 10 | 41 | 45 | −4 | 28 | |
| 8 | FC Tigers, Tampere | 22 | 7 | 5 | 10 | 50 | 52 | −2 | 26 | |
| 9 | PJK, Pirkkala | 22 | 7 | 3 | 12 | 35 | 66 | −31 | 24 | |
| 10 | YlöR, Ylöjärvi | 22 | 5 | 7 | 10 | 40 | 48 | −8 | 22 | |
| 11 | NoPy, Nokia | 22 | 5 | 4 | 13 | 27 | 40 | −13 | 19 | Relegated |
| 12 | ErHu, Valkeakoski | 22 | 1 | 3 | 18 | 21 | 121 | −100 | 6 | Relegated |

==== Relegation playoff ====
Härmä 5-0 FC Vapsi

Härmä promoted, FC Vapsi relegated.

=== Turku and Åland, Turku and Ahvenanmaa ===
| Pos | Team | Pld | W | D | L | GF | GA | GD | Pts | Qualification or relegation |
|---|---|---|---|---|---|---|---|---|---|---|
| 1 | TuTo, Turku | 22 | 14 | 4 | 4 | 64 | 36 | +28 | 46 | Promotion Playoff Group B |
| 2 | FC Boda, Dragsfjärd | 22 | 13 | 6 | 3 | 58 | 21 | +37 | 45 | |
| 3 | JyTy, Turku | 22 | 13 | 3 | 6 | 47 | 31 | +16 | 42 | |
| 4 | ÅIFK, Turku | 22 | 13 | 2 | 7 | 92 | 39 | +53 | 41 | |
| 5 | Vilpas, Salo | 22 | 12 | 3 | 7 | 42 | 37 | +5 | 39 | |
| 6 | HammIK, Hammarland | 22 | 12 | 2 | 8 | 47 | 38 | +9 | 38 | |
| 7 | IFFK, Finström | 22 | 10 | 4 | 8 | 50 | 37 | +13 | 34 | |
| 8 | TPK, Turku | 22 | 9 | 5 | 8 | 46 | 43 | +3 | 32 | |
| 9 | SCR, Raisio | 22 | 6 | 3 | 13 | 39 | 69 | −30 | 21 | |
| 10 | KaaRe, Kaarina | 22 | 6 | 2 | 14 | 32 | 54 | −22 | 20 | |
| 11 | PiPS, Piikkiö | 22 | 3 | 1 | 18 | 26 | 56 | −30 | 10 | Relegated |
| 12 | UPK, Uusikaupunki | 22 | 3 | 1 | 18 | 24 | 106 | −82 | 10 | Relegated |

=== Promotion Playoff ===
==== Promotion Playoff Group A ====
- City Stars 6-0 LoPa
- MPS bye

Round 2

- MPS 2-1 City Stars
- LoPa bye

Round 3

- LoPa 0-3 MPS
- City Stars bye

Final Table:

| Pos | Team | Pld | W | D | L | GF | GA | GD | Pts | Promotion |
|---|---|---|---|---|---|---|---|---|---|---|
| 1 | MPS, Helsinki | 2 | 2 | 0 | 0 | 5 | 1 | +4 | 6 | Promoted |
| 2 | City Stars, Lahti | 2 | 1 | 0 | 1 | 7 | 2 | +5 | 3 | |
| 3 | LoPa, Lohja | 2 | 0 | 0 | 2 | 0 | 9 | −9 | 0 | |

==== Promotion Playoff Group B ====
Round 1

- PS-44 1-0 FC Rauma
- TuTo bye

Round 2

- TuTo 0-4 PS-44
- FC Rauma bye

Round 3

- FC Rauma 4-3 TuTo
- PS-44 bye

Final Table:

| Pos | Team | Pld | W | D | L | GF | GA | GD | Pts | Promotion |
|---|---|---|---|---|---|---|---|---|---|---|
| 1 | PS-44, Valkeakoski | 2 | 2 | 0 | 0 | 5 | 0 | +5 | 6 | Promoted |
| 2 | FC Rauma | 2 | 1 | 0 | 1 | 4 | 4 | 0 | 3 | |
| 3 | TuTo, Turku | 2 | 0 | 0 | 2 | 3 | 8 | −5 | 0 | |

==== Promotion Playoff Group C ====
Round 1

- SiPS 1-3 JJK II
- KTP bye

Round 2

- KTP 5-0 SiPS
- JJK II bye

Round 3

- JJK II 2-1 KTP
- SiPS bye

Final Table:

| Pos | Team | Pld | W | D | L | GF | GA | GD | Pts | Promotion |
|---|---|---|---|---|---|---|---|---|---|---|
| 1 | JJK Jyväskylä II | 2 | 2 | 0 | 0 | 5 | 2 | +3 | 6 | Promoted |
| 2 | KTP, Kotka | 2 | 1 | 0 | 1 | 6 | 2 | +4 | 3 | |
| 3 | SiPS, Siilinjärvi | 2 | 0 | 0 | 2 | 1 | 8 | −7 | 0 | |

==== Promotion Playoff Group D ====
Round 1

- Lynx 4-0 NIK
- Norrvalla FF bye

Round 2

- NIK 2-1 Norrvalla FF
- Lynx bye

Round 3

- Norrvalla FF 0-7 Lynx
- NIK bye

Final Table:

| Pos | Team | Pld | W | D | L | GF | GA | GD | Pts | Promotion |
|---|---|---|---|---|---|---|---|---|---|---|
| 1 | FC Lynx, Rovaniemi | 2 | 2 | 0 | 0 | 11 | 0 | +11 | 6 | Promoted |
| 2 | NIK, Uusikaarlepyy | 2 | 1 | 0 | 1 | 2 | 5 | −3 | 3 | |
| 3 | Norrvalla FF, Vöyri | 2 | 0 | 0 | 2 | 1 | 9 | −8 | 0 | |

== References and sources ==
- Finnish FA
- ResultCode
