= 2003 Kolmonen – Finnish League Division 3 =

Finnish League Division 3
- Season: 2003
- Champions: PMP; TiPS; LPS; MiKi; Huima; LehPa; FC Tarmo; FC-88 Kemi; FC Rio Grande; Virkiä; EuPa; TKT; ÅIFK
- Promoted: TiPS; LPS; TKT; EuPa; MiKi; LehPa; FC Rio Grande; Huima

League tables for teams participating in Kolmonen, the fourth tier of the Finnish soccer league system, in 2003.

== League tables 2003 ==
=== Helsinki and Uusimaa ===
==== Section 1 ====
Pos	Team	Pld	W	D	L	GF	GA	GD	Pts	Qualification or relegation
1	PMP, Espoo	22	17	3	2	62	17	+45	54	Promotion Playoff Group A
2	FC HIK, Hanko	22	18	0	4	65	24	+41	54	
3	GrIFK, Kauniainen	22	14	2	6	78	21	+57	44	
4	EBK, Espoo	22	11	3	8	50	36	+14	36	
5	NuPS, Nummela	22	10	4	8	57	35	+22	34	
6	Kelohonka, Espoo	22	7	9	6	39	37	+2	30	
7	FC Espoo II	22	7	5	10	48	54	−6	26	
8	Pöxyt, Espoo	22	7	4	11	33	51	−18	25	
9	LoPa, Lohja	22	6	6	10	36	42	−6	24	
10	BK-46, Karjaa	22	5	7	10	28	37	−9	22	
11	EsPa, Espoo	22	5	2	15	35	98	−63	17	Relegated
12	LePa, Espoo	22	1	3	18	21	90	−69	6	Relegated

==== Section 2 ====
Pos	Team	Pld	W	D	L	GF	GA	GD	Pts	Qualification or relegation
1	TiPS, Vantaa	22	16	2	4	67	26	+41	50	Promotion Playoff Group A
2	JäPS, Järvenpää	22	15	3	4	52	37	+15	48	
3	City Stars, Lahti	22	12	4	6	53	40	+13	40	
4	PuiU, Helsinki	22	11	3	8	59	42	+17	36	
5	SAPA, Helsinki	22	9	5	8	38	27	+11	32	
6	SUMU, Helsinki	22	8	5	9	47	46	+1	29	
7	Kiffen II, Helsinki	22	8	4	10	34	30	+4	28	
8	TuPS, Tuusula	22	8	3	11	40	53	−13	27	
9	VJS, Vantaa	22	7	4	11	44	61	−17	25	
10	KP-75, Kerava	22	7	3	12	34	51	−17	24	
11	KOPSE, Vantaa	22	5	3	14	36	57	−21	18	Relegated
12	Naseva, Nastola	22	5	3	14	37	71	−34	18	Relegated

==== Section 3 ====
Pos	Team	Pld	W	D	L	GF	GA	GD	Pts	Qualification or relegation
1	LPS, Helsinki	22	19	1	2	101	25	+76	58	Promotion Playoff Group A
2	PPV, Helsinki	22	14	4	4	70	36	+34	46	
3	Ponnistus, Helsinki	22	13	2	7	60	32	+28	41	
4	RIlves, Riihimäki	22	12	3	7	40	33	+7	39	
5	MPS, Helsinki	22	12	2	8	69	34	+35	38	
6	Pato, Tervakoski	22	12	1	9	56	40	+16	37	
7	FC POHU, Helsinki	22	10	5	7	38	37	+1	35	
8	Team KäPa, Helsinki	22	7	6	9	34	50	−16	27	
9	FC Futura II, Porvoo	22	6	1	15	33	79	−46	19	
10	FC Ogeli, Helsinki	22	4	4	14	27	64	−37	16	
11	Nateva, Nurmijärvi	22	3	3	16	24	81	−57	12	Relegated
12	HaNa, Hausjärvi	22	3	2	17	25	66	−41	11	Relegated

=== South-East Finland, Kaakkois-Suomi ===
Pos	Team	Pld	W	D	L	GF	GA	GD	Pts	Qualification or relegation
1	MiKi, Mikkeli	24	21	1	2	96	27	+69	64	Promotion Playoff Group C
2	Kajo, Valkeala	24	17	5	2	101	39	+62	56	
3	PEPO, Lappeenranta	24	16	5	3	75	25	+50	53	
4	Rakuunat II, Lappeenranta	24	10	5	9	47	34	+13	35	
5	Edustus STPS, Savonlinna	24	10	4	10	53	47	+6	34	
6	KTP, Kotka	24	10	4	10	54	49	+5	34	
7	FC PaSa, Imatra	24	10	4	10	37	43	−6	34	
8	SavU, Mikkeli	24	9	4	11	38	46	−8	31	
9	HaPK, Hamina	24	8	3	13	39	60	−21	27	
10	PeKa, Kotka	24	7	3	14	23	51	−28	24	
11	SiU, Simpele	24	6	4	14	23	67	−44	22	
12	FC Kuusankoski II	24	5	6	13	30	50	−20	21	Relegated
13	O Viesti, Mikkeli	24	2	2	20	21	97	−76	8	Relegated

=== Central Finland, Keski-Suomi ===
Pos	Team	Pld	W	D	L	GF	GA	GD	Pts	Qualification or relegation
1	Huima, Äänekoski	22	19	2	1	83	14	+69	59	Promotion Playoff Group C
2	JIlves, Jämsänkoski	22	14	2	6	61	29	+32	44	
3	PaRi, Palokka	22	13	2	7	51	32	+19	41	
4	KeuPa, Keuruu	22	12	2	8	57	51	+6	38	
5	KaPa-51, Kangasniemi	22	11	1	10	46	51	−5	34	
6	BET, Jyväskylä	22	9	5	8	53	63	−10	32	
7	JPS, Jyväskylä	22	7	8	7	54	39	+15	29	
8	LPK, Jyväskylä	22	8	5	9	27	35	−8	29	
9	JJK Jyväskylä II	22	8	3	11	50	57	−7	27	
10	HuKi, Jyväskylä	22	6	5	11	49	63	−14	23	
11	VJK, Viitasaari	22	3	5	14	32	56	−24	14	Relegated
12	PPK, Pihtipudas	22	1	2	19	23	96	−73	5	Relegated

=== Eastern Finland, Itä-Suomi ===
Pos	Team	Pld	W	D	L	GF	GA	GD	Pts	Qualification or relegation
1	LehPa, Kontiolahti	20	14	4	2	66	29	+37	46	Promotion Playoff Group C
2	SiPS, Siilinjärvi	20	12	6	2	77	41	+36	42	
3	Zulimanit, Kuopio	20	13	2	5	70	33	+37	41	
4	SuPa, Suonenjoki	20	10	4	6	44	32	+12	34	
5	JoPS, Joensuu	20	7	4	9	46	37	+9	25	
6	SaPa, Pieksämäki	20	7	2	11	44	48	−4	23	
7	JuPS, Juuka	20	6	4	10	39	59	−20	22	
8	PAVE, Iisalmi	20	6	3	11	30	46	−16	21	
9	KiuPa, Kiuruvesi	20	5	5	10	41	63	−22	20	
10	MPR, Kuopio	20	5	4	11	42	87	−45	19	Relegated
11	Warkaus JK II	20	4	4	12	30	54	−24	16	Relegated

=== Northern Finland, Pohjois-Suomi ===
==== Group A ====
Pos	Team	Pld	W	D	L	GF	GA	GD	Pts	Qualification or relegation
1	FC Tarmo, Kajaani	16	13	1	2	44	22	+22	40	Promotion Playoff Group D
2	HauPa, Haukipudas	16	10	1	5	53	28	+25	31	
3	FC Kurenpojat, Pudasjärvi	16	10	0	6	42	31	+11	30	
4	Dreeverit, Oulu	16	9	2	5	50	31	+19	29	
5	OuTa, Oulu	16	7	1	8	38	45	−7	22	
6	KaPePo, Kajaani	16	6	2	8	21	34	−13	20	
7	FC Raahe	16	6	1	9	33	31	+2	19	
8	JS Hercules, Oulu	16	5	3	8	22	40	−18	18	Relegated
9	Tarmokkaat, Oulu	16	0	1	15	18	68	−50	1	Relegated

==== Group B ====
Pos	Team	Pld	W	D	L	GF	GA	GD	Pts	Qualification or relegation
1	FC-88 Kemi	12	10	1	1	53	7	+46	31	Promotion Playoff Group D
2	Kontio, Kolari	12	7	4	1	30	14	+16	25	
3	Roi United, Rovaniemi	12	7	3	2	38	17	+21	24	
4	FC Muurola	12	6	2	4	27	30	−3	20	
5	TePS, Tervola	12	5	0	7	16	32	−16	15	Relegated
6	PaPa, Pasmajärvi	12	2	0	10	13	48	−35	6	Relegated
7	ToTa, Tornio	12	0	0	12	12	29	−17	0	Relegated

==== Group C ====
Pos	Team	Pld	W	D	L	GF	GA	GD	Pts	Qualification or relegation
1	FC Rio Grande, Rovaniemi	12	9	1	2	41	17	+24	28	Promotion Playoff Group D
2	KauPa, Kittilä	12	8	4	0	35	11	+24	28	
3	FC Lynx, Saarenkylä	12	7	1	4	28	9	+19	22	
4	FC Santa Claus, Rovaniemi	12	7	1	4	45	27	+18	22	
5	KP-55, Kemijärvi	12	4	1	7	20	49	−29	13	Relegated
6	SoPa, Sodankylä	12	2	1	9	14	42	−28	7	Relegated
7	KiPs, Kittilä	12	0	1	11	6	41	−35	1	Relegated

=== Central Ostrobothnia, Keski-Pohjanmaa ===
==== Preliminary stage ====
Pos	Team	Pld	W	D	L	GF	GA	GD	Pts	Qualification
1	KPS, Kokkola	10	7	2	1	33	16	+17	23	Promotion Playoff
2	Esse IK	10	7	1	2	35	17	+18	22	Promotion Playoff
3	NIK, Uusikaarlepyy	10	6	2	2	35	5	+30	20	Promotion Playoff
4	PeFF, Pedersöre	10	6	2	2	24	11	+13	20	Promotion Playoff
5	LoVe, Lohtaja	10	5	2	3	24	22	+2	17	Relegation Playoff
6	GBK II, Kokkola	10	4	1	5	18	27	−9	13	Relegation Playoff
7	HBK, Kruunupyy	10	3	3	4	14	21	−7	12	Relegation Playoff
8	IK Myran, Alaveteli	10	3	3	4	12	20	−8	12	Relegation Playoff
9	Reima, Kokkola	10	2	1	7	10	33	−23	7	Relegation Playoff
10	OuHu, Oulainen	10	2	0	8	11	30	−19	6	Relegation Playoff
11	LBK, Larsmo	10	1	1	8	10	24	−14	4	Relegation Playoff

==== Relegation playoff Group ====
Pos	Team	Pld	W	D	L	GF	GA	GD	Pts	Qualification or relegation
5	IK Myran, Alaveteli	22	11	3	8	43	39	+4	36	
6	OuHu, Ouluainen	22	10	2	10	41	39	+2	32	
7	LoVe, Lohtaja	22	9	4	9	52	46	+6	31	
8	HBK, Kruunupyy	22	8	3	11	36	50	−14	27	
9	Reima, Kokkola	22	8	3	11	31	54	−23	27	
10	GBK II, Kokkola	22	6	3	13	33	60	−27	21	Relegation Playoff
11	LBK, Larsmo	22	5	3	14	28	54	−26	18	Relegated

(preliminary stage points included)

==== Relegation playoff ====
First Leg

Into 2-2 GBK II

Second Leg

GBK II 3-1 Into

GBK II remain at fourth level.

=== Vaasa ===
==== Preliminary stage ====
Pos	Team	Pld	W	D	L	GF	GA	GD	Pts	Qualification
1	Virkiä, Lapua	12	9	1	2	41	14	+27	28	Promotion Playoff
2	FC KOMU, Mustasaari	12	9	1	2	27	10	+17	28	Promotion Playoff
3	Norrvalla FF	12	8	1	3	31	11	+20	25	Promotion Playoff
4	Sporting, Kristiinankaupunki	12	7	1	4	33	21	+12	22	Promotion Playoff
5	NuPa, Nurmo	12	7	1	4	28	16	+12	22	Relegation Playoff
6	Karhu, Kauhajoki	12	4	3	5	14	21	−7	15	Relegation Playoff
7	IK, Ilmajoki	12	4	3	5	12	22	−10	15	Relegation Playoff
8	Sundom IF	12	4	2	6	27	31	−4	14	Relegation Playoff
9	VPV, Vaasa	12	3	4	5	16	23	−7	13	Relegation Playoff
10	TP-Seinäjoki II	12	4	1	7	16	39	−23	13	Relegation Playoff
11	Sepsi-78, Seinäjoki	12	3	3	6	16	21	−5	12	Relegation Playoff
12	APV, Alavus	12	3	1	8	14	31	−17	10	Relegation Playoff
13	Närpes Kraft II, Närpiö	12	2	0	10	14	29	−15	6	Relegation Playoff

==== Relegation playoff Group ====
Pos	Team	Pld	W	D	L	GF	GA	GD	Pts	Relegation
5	NuPa, Nurmo	20	13	1	6	48	27	+21	40	
6	Sundom IF	20	8	5	7	49	42	+7	29	
7	Karhu, Kauhajoki	20	7	4	9	33	40	−7	25	
8	VPV, Vaasa	20	6	6	8	33	36	−3	24	
9	TP-Seinäjoki II	20	7	3	10	29	60	−31	24	
10	Sepsi-78, Seinäjoki	20	6	5	9	31	33	−2	23	
11	IK, Ilmajoki	20	6	5	9	26	41	−15	23	
12	APV, Alavus	20	7	2	11	29	48	−19	23	Relegated
13	Närpes Kraft II, Närpiö	20	3	1	16	25	52	−27	10	Relegated

(preliminary stage points included)

=== Vaasa/Central Ostrobothnia Promotion Playoff Group ===
Pos	Team	Pld	W	D	L	GF	GA	GD	Pts	Promotion or qualification
1	Virkiä, Lapua	14	11	3	0	45	9	+36	36	Promoted
2	Esse IK	14	7	4	3	28	20	+8	25	Withdraw
3	Norrvalla FF, Vöyri	14	7	3	4	40	28	+12	24	Promotion Playoff Group D
4	FC KOMU, Mustasaari	14	6	4	4	24	27	−3	22	
5	NIK, Uusikaarlepyy	14	5	2	7	15	26	−11	17	
6	KPS, Kokkola	14	3	4	7	25	32	−7	13	
7	Sporting, Kristiinankaupunki	14	2	4	8	23	35	−12	10	
8	PeFF, Pedersöre	14	2	2	10	12	35	−23	8	

NB: Esse IK withdrew from Promotion Playoff and were replaced by Norrvalla FF.

=== Satakunta ===
Pos	Team	Pld	W	D	L	GF	GA	GD	Pts	Qualification or relegation
1	EuPa, Eura	18	15	1	2	71	15	+56	46	Promotion Playoff Group B
2	TOVE, Pori	18	12	4	2	62	25	+37	40	
3	MuSa II, Pori	18	9	6	3	41	20	+21	33	
4	KaPa, Kankaanpää	18	8	4	6	42	33	+9	28	
5	RuosV, Pori	18	9	1	8	46	43	+3	28	
6	Nasta, Nakkila	18	6	5	7	45	42	+3	23	
7	RKV, Rauma	18	5	1	12	31	55	−24	16	
8	KKV, Kokemäki	18	4	3	11	36	61	−25	15	
9	MerI, Merikarvia	18	4	2	12	33	74	−41	14	
10	HNS, Huittinen	18	4	0	14	27	66	−39	12	Relegated

=== Tampere ===
Pos	Team	Pld	W	D	L	GF	GA	GD	Pts	Qualification or relegation
1	TKT, Tampere	22	18	2	2	78	20	+58	56	Promotion Playoff Group B
2	Ilves, Tampere	22	15	1	6	66	35	+31	46	
3	PP-70 II, Tampere	22	12	2	8	40	41	−1	38	
4	VaKP, Valkeakoski	22	10	4	8	53	50	+3	34	
5	FC Tigers, Tampere	22	10	3	9	54	49	+5	33	
6	TP-49, Toijala	22	9	4	9	32	36	−4	31	
7	ErHu, Valkeakoski	22	8	6	8	50	57	−7	30	
8	Loiske, Lempäälä	22	8	4	10	33	41	−8	28	
9	NoPS, Nokia	22	7	3	12	33	44	−11	24	
10	ViiPV, Viiala	22	7	2	13	40	62	−22	23	
11	FC Hämeenlinna II	22	5	3	14	32	53	−21	18	Relegated
12	Härmä, Hämeenlinna	22	4	4	14	39	62	−23	16	Relegated

=== Turku and Åland, Turku and Ahvenanmaa ===
Pos	Team	Pld	W	D	L	GF	GA	GD	Pts	Qualification or relegation
1	ÅIFK, Turku	22	18	1	3	85	21	+64	55	Promotion Playoff Group B
2	FC Boda, Dragsfjärd	22	13	5	4	47	23	+24	44	
3	JyTy, Turku	22	13	2	7	59	39	+20	41	
4	TPK, Turku	22	12	4	6	67	43	+24	40	
5	KaaRe, Kaarina	22	10	3	9	44	48	−4	33	
6	IFFK, Finström	22	8	5	9	39	38	+1	29	
7	UPK, Uusikaupunki	22	8	5	9	41	49	−8	29	
8	Lieto	22	7	5	10	57	65	−8	26	
9	Vilpas, Salo	22	6	8	8	29	45	−16	26	
10	TuTo, Turku	22	6	5	11	45	44	+1	23	
11	TuWe, Turku	22	5	4	13	34	63	−29	19	Relegated
12	HammIK, Hammarland	22	1	3	18	22	91	−69	6	Relegated

=== Promotion Playoff ===
==== Promotion Playoff Group A ====
Round 1

PMP 1-2 TiPS
LPS bye

Round 2

TiPS 4-1 LPS
PMP bye

Round 3

LPS 3-1 PMP
TiPS bye

Final Table:

Pos	Team	Pld	W	D	L	GF	GA	GD	Pts	Promotion or qualification
1	TiPS, Vantaa	2	2	0	0	6	2	+4	6	Promoted
2	LPS, Helsinki	2	1	0	1	4	5	−1	3	Promoted
3	PMP, Espoo	2	0	0	2	2	5	−3	0	Promotion Playoff

==== Promotion Playoff Group B ====
Round 1

TKT 5-1 EuPa
ÅIFK bye

Round 2

EuPa 3-1 ÅIFK
TKT bye

Round 3

ÅIFK 0-5 TKT
EuPa bye

Table:

Pos	Team	Pld	W	D	L	GF	GA	GD	Pts	Promotion or qualification
1	TKT, Tampere	2	2	0	0	10	1	+9	6	Promoted
2	EuPa, Eura	2	1	0	1	4	6	−2	3	Promoted
3	ÅIFK, Turku	2	0	0	2	1	8	−7	0	Promotion Playoff

==== Promotion Playoff Group C ====
Round 1

LehPa 2-1 Huima
MiKi bye

Round 2

Huima 0-2 MiKi
LehPa bye

Round 3

MiKi 3-1 LehPa
Huima bye

Final Table:

Pos	Team	Pld	W	D	L	GF	GA	GD	Pts	Promotion or qualification
1	MiKi, Mikkeli	2	2	0	0	5	1	+4	6	Promoted
2	LehPa, Kontiolahti	2	1	0	1	3	4	−1	3	Promoted
3	Huima, Äänekoski	2	0	0	2	1	4	−3	0	Promotion Playoff

==== Promotion Playoff Group D ====
Round 1

First Leg - FC Rio Grande 2-1 FC-88

Second Leg - FC-88 1-1 FC Rio Grande

Round 2

First Leg - FC Tarmo 1-2 FC Rio Grande

Second Leg - FC Rio Grande 1-1 FC Tarmo

Round 3

First Leg - Norrvalla FF 3-1 FC Rio Grande

Second Leg - FC Rio Grande 2-0 Norrvalla FF

FC Rio Grande promoted, Norrvalla FF play promotion playoffs.

=== Division Two/Division Three Playoffs ===
First Legs

PMP 0-3 Kiffen
Huima 4-2 FCV
Norrvalla FF awd KaIK [awarded 0-3 due to Norrvalla FF withdrawing]
ÅIFK 2-1 MaPS

Second Legs

Kiffen 5-1 PMP
MaPS 2-0 ÅIFK
FCV 0-1 Huima
KaIK n/p Norrvalla FF

Huima promoted, FCV relegated.
Kiffen, MaPS and KaIK remain at third level.

== References and sources ==
- Finnish FA
- ResultCode
