= 2006 Kolmonen – Finnish League Division 3 =

Finnish League Division 3
- Season: 2006
- Champions: LoPa (not promoted); City Stars; PuiU; MiKi; FCJ Blackbird; Zulimanit (not promoted); KajHa; Öja-73(not promoted); MuSa; KOO-VEE; IFFK
- Promoted: 8 teams above; Norrvalla& FF; KPV II

League tables for teams participating in Kolmonen, the fourth tier of the Finnish soccer league system, in 2006.

== League Tables 2006 ==
=== Helsinki and Uusimaa ===
==== Section 1 ====
Pos	Team	Pld	W	D	L	GF	GA	GD	Pts	Qualification or relegation
1	LoPa, Lohja	22	17	3	2	61	22	+39	54	Promotion Playoff Group A
2	Pöxyt, Espoo	22	12	4	6	41	31	+10	40	
3	FC HIK, Hanko	22	12	2	8	54	28	+26	38	
4	EBK, Espoo	22	11	3	8	54	40	+14	36	
5	NuPS, Nummela	22	11	3	8	52	39	+13	36	
6	BK-46, Karjaa	22	10	4	8	52	41	+11	34	
7	FC Espoo 2	22	10	3	9	44	41	+3	33	
8	PMP, Espoo	22	9	2	11	46	45	+1	29	
9	PPV, Helsinki	22	9	2	11	42	46	−4	29	
10	Kelohonka, Espoo	22	5	3	14	24	62	−38	18	
11	Kiffen 2, Helsinki	22	4	5	13	30	59	−29	17	Relegated
12	FCK Salamat, Espoo	22	4	2	16	28	74	−46	14	Relegated

==== Section 2 ====
Pos	Team	Pld	W	D	L	GF	GA	GD	Pts	Qualification or relegation
1	City Stars, Lahti	22	18	1	3	73	12	+61	55	Promotion Playoff Group A
2	PK Keski-Uusimaa, Kerava	22	14	5	3	53	19	+34	47	
3	RIlves, Riihimäki	22	13	5	4	52	24	+28	44	
4	Pato, Tervakoski	22	11	3	8	41	40	+1	36	
5	PK-35 2, Helsinki	22	9	3	10	43	45	−2	30	
6	TiPS, Vantaa	22	8	6	8	39	44	−5	30	
7	AC Vantaa	22	8	5	9	40	36	+4	29	
8	SAPA, Helsinki	22	7	5	10	34	32	+2	26	
9	MPS 2, Helsinki	22	7	5	10	49	59	−10	26	
10	Gnistan Ogeli, Helsinki	22	5	4	13	26	44	−18	19	
11	RoU, Helsinki	22	3	6	13	25	69	−44	15	Relegated
12	PK-50, Vantaa	22	4	2	16	28	79	−51	14	Relegated

==== Section 3 ====
Pos	Team	Pld	W	D	L	GF	GA	GD	Pts	Qualification or relegation
1	PuiU, Helsinki	22	15	4	3	66	32	+34	49	Promotion Playoff Group A
2	HIFK, Helsinki	22	14	3	5	50	29	+21	45	
3	Futura, Porvoo	22	14	2	6	59	29	+30	44	
4	JäPS, Järvenpää	22	10	5	7	56	31	+25	35	
5	Kiffen, Helsinki	22	10	5	7	44	31	+13	35	
6	MaKu, Helsinki	22	9	4	9	46	49	−3	31	
7	TuPS, Tuusula	22	9	3	10	46	45	+1	30	
8	FC POHU, Helsinki	22	8	5	9	43	33	+10	29	
9	VALO, Vantaa	22	8	3	11	43	51	−8	27	
10	NJS, Nurmijärvi	22	7	6	9	44	60	−16	27	
11	VJS, Vantaa	22	5	4	13	33	75	−42	19	Relegated
12	SibboV, Sipoo	22	0	2	20	20	85	−65	2	Relegated

=== South-East Finland (Kaakkois-Suomi) ===
Pos	Team	Pld	W	D	L	GF	GA	GD	Pts	Qualification or relegation
1	MiKi, Mikkeli	26	20	4	2	69	18	+51	64	Promotion Playoff Group C
2	Kultsu FC, Joutseno	26	19	5	2	78	24	+54	62	
3	KTP, Kotka	26	15	4	7	55	32	+23	49	
4	VoPpK, Voikkaa	26	15	3	8	61	34	+27	48	
5	PEPO, Lappeenranta	26	14	3	9	48	35	+13	45	
6	SavU, Mikkeli	26	12	4	10	54	49	+5	40	
7	STPS, Savonlinna	26	11	4	11	66	55	+11	37	
8	VKajo, Valkeala	26	9	8	9	70	50	+20	35	
9	Purha, Inkeroinen	26	9	2	15	54	60	−6	29	
10	HP-47, Heinola	26	8	5	13	40	62	−22	29	
11	SiU, Simpele	26	7	2	17	31	73	−42	23	
12	HaPK, Hamina	26	6	3	17	34	74	−40	21	
13	PeKa, Kotka	26	6	2	18	40	59	−19	20	Relegated
14	FC Loviisa	26	5	3	18	27	102	−75	18	Relegated

=== Central Finland (Keski-Suomi) ===
Pos	Team	Pld	W	D	L	GF	GA	GD	Pts	Qualification or relegation
1	FCJ Blackbird, Jyväskylä	18	11	5	2	56	24	+32	38	Promotion Playoff Group C
2	LPK, Jyväskylä	18	9	4	5	44	29	+15	31	
3	JIlves, Jämsänkoski	18	9	4	5	46	35	+11	31	
4	BET, Jyväskylä	18	9	3	6	39	33	+6	30	
5	Pamaus, Laukaa	18	8	3	7	41	31	+10	27	
6	PaRi, Palokka	18	6	4	8	44	48	−4	22	
7	SäyRi, Säynätsalo	18	5	6	7	38	41	−3	21	
8	JPS, Jyävskylä	18	6	2	10	29	40	−11	20	
9	Huima II, Äänekoski	18	5	2	11	31	56	−25	17	Relegation Playoff
10	FCV/Reds, Vaajakoski	18	4	3	11	32	63	−31	15	Relegated

==== Relegation playoff ====
Huima II withdrew, HPP promoted.

=== Eastern Finland (Itä-Suomi) ===
Pos	Team	Pld	W	D	L	GF	GA	GD	Pts	Qualification or relegation
1	Zulimanit, Kuopio	22	18	3	1	85	17	+68	57	Withdrew from Playoff
2	SiPS, Siilinjärvi	22	15	2	5	52	31	+21	47	Withdrew from Playoff
3	Riverball, Joensuu	22	13	6	3	53	21	+32	45	Promotion Playoff Group C
4	LehPa, Kontiolahti	22	12	4	6	58	29	+29	40	
5	PK-37, Iisalmi	22	11	7	4	39	19	+20	40	
6	SaPa, Pieksämäki	22	9	6	7	42	33	+9	33	
7	JoPS, Joensuu	22	10	1	11	58	57	+1	31	
8	PAVE, Iisalmi	22	8	4	10	30	41	−11	28	
9	Warkaus JK 2	22	7	3	12	33	51	−18	24	
10	SC KuFu-98, Kuopio	22	5	6	11	43	53	−10	21	Relegated
11	PK-37 2, Iisalmi	22	2	1	19	18	92	−74	7	Relegated
12	ToPS-90, Tohmajärvi	22	0	1	21	21	88	−67	1	Relegated

NB: Zulimanit and SiPS withdrew from Promotion Playoff and Riverball took their place.

=== Northern Finland (Pohjois-Suomi) ===
Pos	Team	Pld	W	D	L	GF	GA	GD	Pts	Qualification or relegation
1	KajHa, Kajaani	22	17	1	4	67	21	+46	52	Promotion Playoff Group C
2	Tervarit, Oulu	22	16	3	3	81	25	+56	51	
3	HauPa, Haukipudas	22	14	3	5	62	25	+37	45	
4	FC Raahe	22	14	2	6	72	50	+22	44	
5	FC Santa Claus, Rovaniemi	22	11	1	10	55	49	+6	34	
6	FC Rio Grande, Rovaniemi	22	9	7	6	51	48	+3	34	
7	FC Kurenpojat, Pudasjärvi	22	9	5	8	63	64	−1	32	
8	FC Tarmo, Kajaani	22	8	3	11	43	41	+2	27	
9	OuTa, Oulu	22	7	1	14	45	73	−28	22	
10	ToTa, Tornio	22	6	3	13	41	61	−20	21	
11	Kontio, Kolari	22	3	1	18	24	111	−87	10	Relegated
12	FC Muurola	22	1	4	17	29	65	−36	7	Relegated

=== Central Ostrobothnia (Keski-Pohjanmaa) ===
==== Preliminary stage ====
Pos	Team	Pld	W	D	L	GF	GA	GD	Pts	Qualification
1	KPV II, Kokkola	10	8	2	0	24	6	+18	26	Promotion Playoff
2	NIK, Uusikaarlepyy	10	7	2	1	27	5	+22	23	Promotion Playoff
3	Öja-73	10	5	1	4	22	16	+6	16	Promotion Playoff
4	Jaro II, Pietarsaari	10	4	4	2	16	17	−1	16	Promotion Playoff
5	Esse IK	10	4	2	4	15	15	0	14	Promotion Playoff
6	IK Myran, Alaveteli	10	4	2	4	15	17	−2	14	Promotion Playoff
7	GBK II, Kokkola	10	4	1	5	19	18	+1	13	Relegation Playoff
8	Reima, Kokkola	10	3	2	5	13	25	−12	11	Relegation Playoff
9	PeFF, Pedersöre	10	2	2	6	14	20	−6	8	Relegation Playoff
10	KP-V, Kaustinen	10	1	4	5	13	20	−7	7	Relegation Playoff
11	OuHu, Oulainen	10	1	2	7	15	34	−19	5	Relegation Playoff

==== Relegation playoff Group ====
Pos	Team	Pld	W	D	L	GF	GA	GD	Pts	Qualification
7	GBK II, Kokkola	18	8	2	8	42	35	+7	26	
8	Reima, Kokkola	18	7	3	8	29	39	−10	24	
9	OuHu, Oulainen	18	5	3	10	31	51	−20	18	
10	KP-V, Kaustinen	18	3	8	7	30	39	−9	17	
11	PeFF, Pedersöre	18	4	3	11	24	35	−11	15	Relegation Playoff

(preliminary stage points included)

==== Relegation playoff ====
First Leg

- FC YPA II 3-0 PeFF

Second Leg

- PeFF 3-2 FC YPA II

FC YPA II promoted, PeFF relegated.

=== Vaasa ===
==== Preliminary stage ====
Pos	Team	Pld	W	D	L	GF	GA	GD	Pts	Qualification
1	VIFK/Young Boys, Vaasa	11	7	3	1	27	12	+15	24	Promotion Playoff
2	VPS Juniorit, Vaasa	11	7	2	2	32	15	+17	23	Promotion Playoff
3	Norrvalla FF, Vöyri	11	7	1	3	28	12	+16	22	Promotion Playoff
4	VPV, Vaasa	11	6	1	4	32	16	+16	19	Promotion Playoff
5	TePa, Teuva	11	5	4	2	24	14	+10	19	Promotion Playoff
6	FC KOMU, Mustasaari	11	6	1	4	24	16	+8	19	Promotion Playoff
7	NuPa, Nurmo	11	5	1	5	30	24	+6	16	Relegation Playoff
8	Karhu, Kauhajoki	11	4	1	6	20	31	−11	13	Relegation Playoff
9	IK, Ilmajoki	11	3	3	5	15	22	−7	12	Relegation Playoff
10	Sporting, Kristiinankaupunki	11	3	2	6	16	24	−8	11	Relegation Playoff
11	Ponnistus, Lapua	11	1	2	8	8	47	−39	5	Relegation Playoff
12	APV, Alavus	11	1	1	9	16	39	−23	4	Relegation Playoff

==== Relegation playoff Group ====
Pos	Team	Pld	W	D	L	GF	GA	GD	Pts	Relegation
7	Karhu, Kauhajoki	10	6	2	2	32	21	+11	33	
8	NuPa, Nurmo	10	5	2	3	37	27	+10	33	
9	Sporting, Kristiinankaupunki	10	5	2	3	36	19	+17	28	
10	IK, Ilmajoki	10	4	3	3	16	18	−2	27	
11	APV, Alavus	10	2	2	6	24	38	−14	12	Relegated
12	Ponnistus, Lapua	10	2	1	7	13	35	−22	12	Relegated

(preliminary stage points included)

=== Vaasa/Central Ostrobothnia Promotion Playoff Group ===
Pos	Team	Pld	W	D	L	GF	GA	GD	Pts	Qualification
1	Öja-73	11	8	2	1	30	13	+17	26	Withdrew from Playoff
2	KPV II, Kokkola	11	8	0	3	30	8	+22	24	Promotion Playoff Group B
3	Norrvalla FF, Vöyri	11	8	0	3	33	12	+21	24	Promotion Playoff Group B
4	NIK, Uusikaarlepyy	11	6	2	3	19	16	+3	20	
5	TePa, Teuva	11	5	3	3	24	22	+2	18	
6	VIFK/Young Boys, Vaasa	11	4	3	4	21	15	+6	15	
7	FC KOMU, Mustasaari	11	4	1	6	18	25	−7	13	
8	VPS Juniorit, Vaasa	11	3	3	5	20	36	−16	12	
9	Esse IK	11	3	2	6	19	23	−4	11	
10	VPV, Vaasa	11	3	2	6	26	34	−8	11	
11	Jaro II, Pietarsaari	11	1	3	7	9	25	−16	6	
12	IK Myran, Alaveteli	11	1	3	7	16	36	−20	6	

NB: Öja-73 withdrew from Promotion Playoff and Norrvalla FF took their place.

=== Satakunta ===
Pos	Team	Pld	W	D	L	GF	GA	GD	Pts	Qualification or relegation
1	MuSa, Pori	18	16	0	2	67	10	+57	48	Promotion Playoff Group B
2	EuPa, Eura	18	14	2	2	74	12	+62	44	
3	FC Rauma	18	14	0	4	66	13	+53	42	
4	RuosV, Pori	18	9	2	7	40	48	−8	29	
5	Nasta, Nakkila	18	7	3	8	37	61	−24	24	
6	TOVE, Pori	18	6	1	11	33	48	−15	19	
7	MuSa 2, Pori	18	5	1	12	26	39	−13	16	
8	VAlku, Ulvila	18	5	1	12	29	53	−24	16	
9	RKV, Rauma	18	5	1	12	29	75	−46	16	
10	MInto, Merikarvia	18	3	1	14	18	60	−42	10	Relegated

=== Tampere ===
Pos	Team	Pld	W	D	L	GF	GA	GD	Pts	Qualification or relegation
1	KOO-VEE, Tampere	20	13	3	4	42	21	+21	42	Promotion Playoff Group B
2	FC Tigers, Tampere	20	11	5	4	41	21	+20	38	
3	Loiske, Lempäälä	20	11	4	5	51	27	+24	37	
4	TP-49, Toijala	20	10	6	4	53	36	+17	36	
5	PJK, Pirkkala	20	10	3	7	55	28	+27	33	
6	VaKP, Valkeakoski	20	9	2	9	38	43	−5	29	
7	KaVo, Kangasala	20	7	6	7	44	34	+10	27	
8	LaVe, Lammi	20	6	2	12	28	45	−17	20	
9	YlöR, Ylöjärvi	20	6	1	13	26	65	−39	19	
10	FC Vapsi, Vammala	20	6	0	14	29	61	−32	18	Relegation Playoff
11	PP-70 2, Tampere	20	4	2	14	29	55	−26	14	Relegated

==== Relegation playoff ====
Härmä	5-0	FC Vapsi

Härmä promoted, FC Vapsi relegated.

=== Turku and Åland (Turku and Ahvenanmaa) ===
Pos	Team	Pld	W	D	L	GF	GA	GD	Pts	Qualification or relegation
1	IFFK, Finström	22	19	1	2	82	11	+71	58	Promotion Playoff Group A
2	ÅIFK, Turku	22	17	0	5	79	29	+50	51	
3	FC Boda, Dragsfjärd	22	14	2	6	45	24	+21	44	
4	TuTo, Turku	22	11	5	6	51	34	+17	38	
5	JyTy, Turku	22	11	2	9	47	53	−6	35	
6	LTU, Littoinen	22	10	3	9	38	44	−6	33	
7	TPK, Turku	22	7	4	11	42	53	−11	25	
8	Vilpas, Salo	22	7	4	11	26	37	−11	25	
9	SCR, Raisio	22	7	3	12	28	47	−19	24	
10	TPK 2, Turku	22	5	5	12	33	47	−14	20	
11	HammIK, Hammarland	22	4	2	16	29	72	−43	14	Relegated
12	KaaRe, Kaarina	22	4	1	17	18	67	−49	13	Relegated

=== Promotion Playoff ===
==== Promotion Playoff Group A, South ====
Round 1

- PuiU 1-1 LoPa
- IFFK 2-1 City Stars

Round 2

- LoPa 1-4 IFFK
- City Stars 2-0 PuiU

Round 3

- PuiU 5-1 IFFK
- City Stars 2-0 LoPa

Final Table:

Pos	Team	Pld	W	D	L	GF	GA	GD	Pts	Promotion
1	City Stars, Lahti	3	2	0	1	5	2	+3	6	Promoted
2	IFFK, Finström	3	2	0	1	7	7	0	6	Promoted
3	PuiU, Helsinki	3	1	1	1	6	4	+2	4	Promoted
4	LoPa, Lohja	3	0	1	2	2	7	−5	1	

==== Promotion Playoff Group B, West ====
Round 1

- KOO-VEE 2-2 Norrvalla FF
- MuSa 0-0 KPV II

Round 2

- Norrvalla FF 2-1 MuSa
- KPV II 0-0 KOO-VEE

Round 3

- KOO-VEE 0-3 MuSa
- KPV II 0-0 Norrvalla FF

Final Table:

Pos	Team	Pld	W	D	L	GF	GA	GD	Pts	Promotion
1	Norrvalla FF, Vöyri	3	1	2	0	4	3	+1	5	Promoted
2	MuSa, Pori	3	1	1	1	4	2	+2	4	Promoted
3	KPV II, Kokkola	3	0	3	0	0	0	0	3	Promoted
4	KOO-VEE, Tampere	3	0	2	1	2	5	−3	2	

==== Promotion Playoff Group C, East ====
Round 1

- FCJ Blackbird 1-2 MiKi
- Riverball 0-2 KajHa

Round 2

- MiKi 3-1 Riverball
- KajHa 2-2 FCJ Blackbird

Round 3

- MiKi 0-2 KajHa
- FCJ Blackbird 2-0 Riverball

Final Table:

Pos	Team	Pld	W	D	L	GF	GA	GD	Pts	Promotion
1	KajHa, Kajaani	3	2	1	0	6	2	+4	7	Promoted
2	MiKi, Mikkeli	3	2	0	1	5	4	+1	6	Promoted
3	FCJ Blackbird, Jyväskylä	3	1	1	1	5	4	+1	4	Promoted
4	Riverball, Joensuu	3	0	0	3	1	7	−6	0	

==== Fourth-placed teams ====
Pos	Team	Pld	W	D	L	GF	GA	GD	Pts	Promotion
1	KOO-VEE, Tampere	3	0	2	1	2	5	−3	2	Promoted
2	LoPa, Lohja	3	0	1	2	2	7	−5	1	
3	Riverball, Joensuu	3	0	0	3	1	7	−6	0	

NB: KOO-VEE promoted as the best fourth-placed team.

== References and sources ==
- Finnish FA
- ResultCode
- Kolmonen (jalkapallo) (in Finnish)
