= Kolmonen =

Finnish football league

Kolmonen (in Finnish) Trean (in Swedish)
- Founded: 1973
- Country: Finland
- Number of clubs: 110
- Level on pyramid: 4 (1973–2023); 5 (2024–)
- Promotion to: Kakkonen
- Relegation to: Nelonen
- Domestic cup: Finnish Cup
- Current champions: ÅIFK; FC Haka j. Jippo-j/PunaMusta; FC Blackbird; Union Plaani; EBK; Valtti; HIFK; KaPa
- Current: 2026 Kolmonen

Kolmonen or III divisioona is the fifth level in the league system of Finnish football and comprises 110 Finnish football teams. The III divisioona was introduced in 1973 and in the mid-1990s became known as the Kolmonen (Number Three in English and Trean in Swedish). Starting from 2024, Kolmonen has served as the fifth tier of the Finnish football league system.

== The competition ==
There are 110 clubs in the Kolmonen, divided in 10 groups of 8 to 12 teams each representing a geographical area. During the course of a season (starting in April and ending in October) each club plays the others twice, once on their home ground and once on that of their opponents. The top team in each Kolmonen group are either promoted to Kakkonen or go to promotion play-offs with six teams in total getting promoted, and the two lowest placed teams are normally relegated to the Nelonen.

== Administration ==
=== Football Association of Finland (SPL) ===
The Football Association of Finland (Finnish: Suomen Palloliitto, SPL; Swedish: Finlands Bollförbund, FBF) administered the Kolmonen from 1973 until 1995. There were 9 sections which were divided on a regional basis with between 8 and 12 teams in each.

=== District Football Associations ===
Since 1996 until 2020 the administration of the Kolmonen was delegated to the 12 district authorities of the SPL. Responsibilities for the 10 sections were divided as follows:

- SPL Helsinki and SPL Uusimaa - 3 sections
- SPL Kaakkois-Suomi - 1 section
- SPL Itä-Suomi and SPL Keski-Suomi SPL - 1 section
- SPL Pohjois-Suomi - 1 section
- SPL Keski-Suomi and SPL Vaasa - 1 section
- SPL Satakunta - 1 section
- SPL Tampere - 1 section
- SPL Turku and Åland FF - 1 section

Since 2020 the competition administration has returned to the SPL after the fusion of the administrative districts and the SPL.

Teams within the Kolmonen are eligible to compete in the Finnish Cup and the Finnish Regions' Cup. The clubs are normally listed in an abbreviated form and their full names can be viewed by referring to the List of clubs.

== Current clubs - 2026 season ==
=== South - Group A ===
- EIF/Akademi, Ekenäs
- EPS/U23, Espoo
- EsPa, Espoo
- Gilla FC, Helsinki
- GrIFK/Akatemia, Kauniainen
- LePa, Espoo
- LoPa, Lohja
- MPS, Helsinki
- NuPS, Vihti
- PPJ/Ruoholahti, Helsinki
- HooGee, Espoo
- SexyPöxyt, Espoo

=== South - Group B ===
- Atlantis FC/2, Helsinki
- HPS/2, Helsinki
- FC Kontu, Helsinki
- LPS, Helsinki
- MPS/Atletico Malmi, Helsinki
- PPJ/Lauttasaari, Helsinki
- PPS, Vantaa
- TiPS, Tikkurila
- ToTe, Helsinki
- Töölön Taisto, Helsinki
- Valtti, Helsinki
- VJS/Akatemia, Vantaa

=== South - Group C ===
- Atlantis FC/Akatemia, Helsinki
- FC Futura, Porvoo
- IF Gnistan/Ogeli, Helsinki
- JäPS/47, Järvenpää
- FC Kuusysi, Lahti
- MK United, Helsinki
- Ponnistus, Helsinki
- RiPS, Riihimäki
- Sibbo-Vargarna, Sipoo
- TiPS/U21, Tikkurila
- ToTe/Tapio, Helsinki
- TuPS, Tuusula

=== East - Group AC1 ===
- FC Blackbird, Jyväskylä
- JJK/2, Jyväskylä
- JPS, Jyväskylä
- KeuPa, Keuruu
- Komeetat, Jyväskylä
- FC Metso, Jyväskylä
- SaPa, Pieksämäki
- FC Vaajakoski/2, Jyväskylä

=== East - Group AC2 ===
- Kings SC, Kuopio
- NiemU, Rääkkylä
- Jippo-j/PunaMusta, Joensuu
- KuPS Akatemia II, Kuopio
- PK-37, Iisalmi
- SC Zulimanit, Kuopio
- ToU, Siilinjärvi
- Yllätys, Liperi

=== East - Group B ===
- HaPK, Hamina
- Edustus IPS, Imatra
- KJP, Kouvola
- KoPa, Lemi
- Kumu, Kouvola
- Kultsu FC, Lappeenranta
- LAUTP, Lappeenranta
- LAUTP/2, Lappeenranta
- MiPK, Mikkeli
- MP/2, Mikkeli
- PeKa, Kotka
- Edustus STPS, Savonlinna

=== West - Group A ===
- EuPa, Eura
- IFK Mariehamn Akademi, Mariehamn
- JyTy, Turku
- KaaPo, Kaarina
- LTU, Kaarina
- Masku, Masku
- PIF, Pargas
- Peimari United, Sauvo
- PiPS, Kaarina
- Salpa 2, Salo
- VG-62, Naantali
- ÅCF, Turku

=== West - Group B ===
- ACE, Tampere
- Fish United, Tampere
- FC Haka j., Valkeakoski
- FC Lasten, Tampere
- FC LeKi, Lempäälä
- NoPS, Nokia
- Loiske, Lempäälä
- TP-T, Tampere
- TPV/2, Tampere
- Tampere United/2, Tampere
- TP-49, Akaa
- Ylöjärvi United FC, Ylöjärvi

=== West - Group C ===
- FC Kiisto, Vaasa
- KPV/Akatemia, Kokkola
- Sporting Kristina, Kristinestad
- LBK, Larsmo
- NIK, Nykarleby
- SIF, Vaasa
- SJK-j, Seinäjoki
- Sääripotku, Kokkola
- VIFK, Vaasa
- Virkiä, Lapua
- VPV, Vaasa
- FC Ylivieska, Ylivieska

=== North ===
- Ajax, Kempele
- HauPa, Oulu
- Hercules-j, Oulu
- KajHa, Kajaani
- KaPa, Kajaani
- KePS, Kemi
- PonPa, Muhos
- RoPo, Rovaniemi
- FC Santa Claus, Rovaniemi
- Villan Pojat, Oulu

== Seasons - League Tables ==
1970s:				1973	1974	1975	1976	1977	1978	1979
1980s:	1980	1981	1982	1983	1984	1985	1986	1987	1988	1989
1990s:	1990	1991	1992	1993	1994	1995	1996	1997	1998	1999
2000s:	2000	2001	2002	2003	2004	2005	2006	2007	2008	2009
2010s:	2010	2011	2012	2013	2014	2015	2016	2017	2018	2019
2020s:	2020	2021	2022	2023	2024	2025				
