= 2002 Kolmonen – Finnish League Division 3 =

Finnish League Division 3
- Season: 2002
- Champions: FCK; EBK; FC Kontu; FC Pantterit; JJK/2; Zulimanit; FC-88; KauPa; Tervarit 2; EuPa; Ilves; MaPS
- Promoted: FCK; FC Kontu; FC Pantterit; MaPS; SC KuFu-98; FC YPA

League tables for teams participating in Kolmonen, the fourth tier of the Finnish soccer league system, in 2002.

== League tables 2002 ==
=== Helsinki and Uusimaa ===
==== Section 1 ====
Pos	Team	Pld	W	D	L	GF	GA	GD	Pts	Promotion or relegation
1	FCK	22	19	1	2	87	23	+64	58	Promotion Playoffs - Promoted
2	FC HIK	22	13	6	3	69	33	+36	45	
3	GrIFK	22	14	2	6	57	23	+34	44	
4	Kelohonka	22	12	2	8	56	32	+24	38	
5	Nateva	22	11	1	10	48	56	−8	34	
6	NuPS	22	10	3	9	49	44	+5	33	
7	LoPa	22	11	0	11	32	28	+4	33	
8	TiPS	22	8	3	11	38	47	−9	27	
9	BK-46	22	8	1	13	45	54	−9	25	
10	EsPa	22	6	1	15	40	65	−25	19	
11	Zyklon	22	6	1	15	31	88	−57	19	Relegated
12	MPS/2	22	3	1	18	21	80	−59	10	Relegated

==== Section 2 ====
Pos	Team	Pld	W	D	L	GF	GA	GD	Pts	Qualification or relegation
1	EBK	22	15	2	5	67	27	+40	47	Promotion Playoffs
2	JäPS	22	13	4	5	56	30	+26	43	
3	TuPS	22	13	3	6	77	41	+36	42	
4	SAPA	22	12	4	6	36	23	+13	40	
5	Team KäPa	22	11	3	8	50	40	+10	36	
6	KP-75	22	9	7	6	46	35	+11	34	
7	FC Espoo/2	22	9	5	8	54	43	+11	32	
8	Pöxyt	22	8	5	9	42	49	−7	29	
9	VJS	22	8	4	10	38	46	−8	28	
10	PuiU	22	6	2	14	32	62	−30	20	
11	SibboV	22	4	1	17	25	64	−39	13	Relegated
12	Apollo	22	3	2	17	20	83	−63	11	Relegated

==== Section 3 ====
Pos	Team	Pld	W	D	L	GF	GA	GD	Pts	Promotion or relegation
1	FC Kontu	22	15	3	4	81	24	+57	48	Promotion Playoffs - Promoted
2	LPS	22	15	2	5	67	30	+37	47	
3	City Stars	22	15	2	5	55	32	+23	47	
4	Pato	22	10	5	7	56	49	+7	35	
5	FC Ogeli	22	10	4	8	41	40	+1	34	
6	Naseva	22	9	4	9	51	51	0	31	
7	KOPSE	22	9	4	9	54	59	−5	31	
8	MPS	22	8	4	10	62	49	+13	28	
9	PPV	22	6	6	10	42	44	−2	24	
10	Futura 2	22	7	2	13	51	69	−18	23	
11	PuPo FC	22	4	7	11	26	57	−31	19	Relegated
12	HerTo	22	2	1	19	25	107	−82	7	Relegated

=== South-East Finland, Kaakkois-Suomi ===
Pos	Team	Pld	W	D	L	GF	GA	GD	Pts	Promotion or qualification
1	FC Pantterit	20	14	3	3	55	17	+38	45	Promotion Playoffs - Promoted
2	Slinna	20	12	1	7	45	30	+15	37	
3	KTP	20	11	3	6	33	34	−1	36	
4	VKajo	20	10	2	8	43	41	+2	32	
5	PEPO	20	9	3	8	52	34	+18	30	
6	FC Kkoski/2	20	8	5	7	35	37	−2	29	
7	FC PaSa	20	9	1	10	55	42	+13	28	
8	HaPK	20	8	4	8	34	46	−12	28	
9	Rakuunat / 2	20	7	5	8	34	36	−2	26	
10	PeKa	20	3	7	10	27	38	−11	16	
11	SiU	20	1	2	17	14	72	−58	5	Relegation Playoffs

=== Central Finland, Keski-Suomi ===
Pos	Team	Pld	W	D	L	GF	GA	GD	Pts	Qualification or relegation
1	JJK/2	18	12	4	2	54	31	+23	40	Promotion Playoffs
2	FCV	18	11	3	4	54	26	+28	36	
3	Huima	18	11	3	4	55	37	+18	36	
4	PaRi	18	9	3	6	47	31	+16	30	
5	JIlves	18	9	2	7	49	40	+9	29	
6	HuKi	18	9	2	7	51	45	+6	29	
7	JPS	18	7	4	7	48	38	+10	25	
8	LPK	18	4	3	11	36	46	−10	15	
9	KeuPa	18	3	1	14	30	54	−24	10	Relegated
10	HPP	18	2	1	15	17	93	−76	7	Relegated

=== Eastern Finland, Itä-Suomi ===
Pos	Team	Pld	W	D	L	GF	GA	GD	Pts	Promotion or relegation
1	Zulimanit	22	17	1	4	76	20	+56	52	
2	SC KuFu-98	22	15	2	5	69	28	+41	47	Promotion Playoffs - Promoted
3	SiPS	22	13	3	6	68	43	+25	42	
4	JoPS	22	12	4	6	55	38	+17	40	
5	SaPa	22	11	3	8	39	38	+1	36	
6	LehPa	22	11	1	10	43	42	+1	34	
7	PAVE	22	9	5	8	42	32	+10	32	
8	SuPa	22	9	4	9	68	43	+25	31	
9	KiuPa	22	6	4	12	55	55	0	22	
10	Warkaus JK/2	22	6	3	13	31	49	−18	21	Relegation Playoffs
11	NP-H	22	2	7	13	20	83	−63	13	Relegated
12	ToPS-90	22	1	3	18	14	109	−95	6	Relegated

=== Northern Finland, Pohjois-Suomi ===
==== Lappi 1 ====
Pos	Team	Pld	W	D	L	GF	GA	GD	Pts
1	FC-88	14	12	1	1	60	4	+56	37
2	FC Rio Grande	14	11	0	3	63	23	+40	33
3	ArPS	14	9	1	4	57	25	+32	28
4	Rovaniemi Utd	14	7	1	6	39	30	+9	22
5	Kontio	14	7	1	6	39	42	−3	22
6	PaPa	14	3	1	10	22	47	−25	10
7	TePS	14	2	0	12	10	64	−54	6
8	FC Muurola	14	1	3	10	10	65	−55	6

==== Lappi 2 ====
Pos	Team	Pld	W	D	L	GF	GA	GD	Pts
1	KauPa	10	10	0	0	46	8	+38	30
2	FC Santa Claus	10	7	0	3	33	28	+5	21
3	KP-55	10	5	1	4	22	19	+3	16
4	FC Lynx	10	4	1	5	23	20	+3	13
5	SoPa	10	1	2	7	11	29	−18	5
6	KiPS	10	1	0	9	14	45	−31	3

==== Oulu ====
Pos	Team	Pld	W	D	L	GF	GA	GD	Pts	Qualification
1	Tervarit 2	18	15	0	3	86	33	+53	45	Promotion Playoffs
2	HauPa	18	12	2	4	57	30	+27	38	
3	FC Dreeverit	18	11	2	5	40	24	+16	35	
4	OuTa	18	9	1	8	61	37	+24	28	
5	FC Kurenpojat	18	9	1	8	60	41	+19	28	
6	FC Tarmo	18	8	3	7	42	37	+5	27	
7	JS Hercules	18	8	2	8	31	44	−13	26	
8	FC Raahe	18	6	3	9	31	40	−9	21	
9	OuJK	18	2	3	13	22	76	−54	9	
10	KulPa	18	1	1	16	25	93	−68	4	

=== Central Ostrobothnia, Keski-Pohjanmaa ===
Pos	Team	Pld	W	D	L	GF	GA	GD	Pts	Promotion
1	GBK II	16	12	3	1	41	16	+25	39	
2	NIK	16	9	4	3	44	24	+20	31	
3	FC YPA	16	9	2	5	53	24	+29	29	Promotion Playoffs - Promoted
4	KPS	16	8	5	3	41	25	+16	29	
5	EIK	16	8	3	5	48	32	+16	27	
6	PeFF	16	6	4	6	30	31	−1	22	
7	OuHu	16	2	4	10	20	42	−22	10	
8	LBK	16	2	2	12	16	53	−37	8	
9	HBK	16	2	1	13	26	72	−46	7	

=== Vaasa ===
Not available

=== Satakunta ===
Pos	Team	Pld	W	D	L	GF	GA	GD	Pts	Qualification or relegation
1	EuPa	18	15	3	0	70	18	+52	48	Promotion Playoffs
2	KKV	18	10	5	3	64	37	+27	35	
3	MuSa2	18	8	8	2	32	23	+9	32	
4	HOP	18	7	4	7	42	35	+7	25	
5	HNS	18	8	1	9	35	33	+2	25	
6	RuosV	18	6	3	9	29	41	−12	21	
7	TOVE	18	5	4	9	31	42	−11	19	
8	RKV	18	5	3	10	34	53	−19	18	
9	MerI	18	4	4	10	26	53	−27	16	
10	VAlku	18	4	1	13	29	57	−28	13	Relegated

=== Tampere ===
Pos	Team	Pld	W	D	L	GF	GA	GD	Pts	Qualification or relegation
1	Ilves	22	19	1	2	63	21	+42	58	Promotion Playoffs
2	TKT	22	16	3	3	72	18	+54	51	
3	VaKP	22	11	5	6	50	42	+8	38	
4	FC Hämeenlinna	22	10	5	7	59	40	+19	35	
5	ToiP-49	22	9	5	8	46	41	+5	32	
6	NoPS	22	9	5	8	41	39	+2	32	
7	FC Tigers	22	8	7	7	38	33	+5	31	
8	ViiPV	22	6	5	11	55	49	+6	23	
9	Loiske	22	6	5	11	30	51	−21	23	
10	Härmä	22	7	2	13	36	61	−25	23	
11	YlöR	22	6	4	12	34	49	−15	22	Relegated
12	FC Gepardi	22	1	1	20	26	106	−80	4	Relegated

=== Turku and Åland, Turku and Ahvenanmaa ===
Pos	Team	Pld	W	D	L	GF	GA	GD	Pts	Promotion or relegation
1	MaPS	22	18	3	1	71	18	+53	57	Promotion Playoffs - Promoted
2	JyTy	22	9	5	8	45	38	+7	32	
3	IFFK	22	9	5	8	38	31	+7	32	
4	KaaPo 2	22	10	2	10	55	50	+5	32	
5	ÅIFK	22	9	5	8	48	51	−3	32	
6	UPK	22	8	6	8	42	41	+1	30	
7	Vilpas	22	8	5	9	46	42	+4	29	
8	KaaRe	22	8	5	9	37	45	−8	29	
9	TuWe	22	9	1	12	32	50	−18	28	
10	HammIK	22	8	2	12	32	57	−25	26	
11	SCR	22	7	4	11	38	50	−12	25	Relegated
12	PiPS	22	6	3	13	41	52	−11	21	Relegated

=== Promotion Playoffs ===
==== Promotion Playoff Group A ====
- EBK - FCK 1-2
- FCK - FC Kontu 5-2
- FC Kontu - EBK 3-0

Pos	Team	Pld	W	D	L	GF	GA	GD	Pts	Promotion
1	FCK	2	2	0	0	7	3	+4	6	Promoted
2	FC Kontu	2	1	0	1	5	5	0	3	Promotion Playoff - Promoted
3	EBK	2	0	0	2	1	5	−4	0	

==== Promotion Playoff Group B ====
- EuPa - Ilves 2 – 1
- Ilves - MaPS 1 – 2
- MaPS - EuPa 6 – 1

Pos	Team	Pld	W	D	L	GF	GA	GD	Pts	Promotion or qualification
1	MaPS	2	2	0	0	8	2	+6	6	Promoted
2	EuPa	2	1	0	1	3	7	−4	3	Promotion Playoff
3	Ilves	2	0	0	2	2	4	−2	0	

==== Promotion Playoff Group C ====
- SC KuFu-98 – FC Pantterit 2-2
- JJK/2 – SC KuFu-98 0-5
- FC Pantterit – JJK/2 6-1

Pos	Team	Pld	W	D	L	GF	GA	GD	Pts	Promotion
1	FC Pantterit	2	1	1	0	8	3	+5	4	Promoted
2	SC KuFu-98	2	1	1	0	7	2	+5	4	Promotion Playoff - Promoted
3	JJK/2	2	0	0	2	1	11	−10	0	

==== Promotion Playoff Group D ====
- FC YPA - SIF 6 - 0
- Tervarit II - FC YPA 1 - 3
- SIF - Tervarit II 1 - 4

Pos	Team	Pld	W	D	L	GF	GA	GD	Pts	Promotion or qualification
1	FC YPA	2	2	0	0	9	1	+8	6	Promoted
2	Tervarit II	2	1	0	1	5	4	+1	3	Promotion Playoff
3	SIF	2	0	0	2	1	10	−9	0	

==== Additional Playoff Matches ====
- EuPa - FC Kontu 3-2
- FC Kontu - EuPa 4-0

FC Kontu won 6-3 on aggregate and gained promotion

Tervarit II - SC KuFu-98 6-1 (0-1, 1-1)

== References and sources ==
- Finnish FA
- ResultCode
