= 2004 Kolmonen – Finnish League Division 3 =

Finnish League Division 3
- Season: 2004
- Champions: GrIFK; Ponnistus; FC Futura; Kajo; FC Vaajakoski; KuPS 2; Dreeverit; FC-88; Öja-73; PoPa; PS-44; SoVo
- Promoted: GrIFK; Ponnistus; Kajo; KuPS 2; PoPa; SoVo

League tables for teams participating in Kolmonen, the fourth tier of the Finnish soccer league system, in 2004.

== League Tables 2004 ==
=== Helsinki and Uusimaa ===
==== Section 1 ====
Pos	Team	Pld	W	D	L	GF	GA	GD	Pts	Qualification or relegation
1	GrIFK, Kauniainen	22	16	2	4	59	25	+34	50	Promotion Playoff Group A
2	LoPa, Lohja	22	12	3	7	43	28	+15	39	
3	VALO, Vantaa	22	10	3	9	49	65	−16	33	
4	EBK, Espoo	22	10	1	11	40	45	−5	31	
5	FC HIK, Hanko	22	9	3	10	45	36	+9	30	
6	PMP, Espoo	22	9	3	10	44	49	−5	30	
7	FC Espoo 2	22	8	5	9	46	45	+1	29	
8	Pöxyt, Espoo	22	7	7	8	37	38	−1	28	
9	Kelohonka, Espoo	22	7	7	8	43	51	−8	28	
10	EIF 2, Tammisaari	22	8	2	12	48	50	−2	26	
11	BK-46, Karjaa	22	6	7	9	33	49	−16	25	Relegated
12	NuPS, Nummela	22	7	3	12	33	39	−6	24	Relegated

==== Section 2 ====
Pos	Team	Pld	W	D	L	GF	GA	GD	Pts	Qualification or relegation
1	Ponnistus, Helsinki	20	13	3	4	48	23	+25	42	Promotion Playoff Group A
2	City Stars, Lahti	20	12	4	4	74	25	+49	40	
3	TuPS, Tuusula	20	10	5	5	47	33	+14	35	
4	JäPS, Järvenpää	20	9	7	4	58	33	+25	34	
5	PuiU, Helsinki	20	9	4	7	38	40	−2	31	
6	SAPA, Helsinki	20	5	12	3	42	30	+12	27	
7	KP-75, Kerava	20	7	4	9	27	37	−10	25	
8	VJS, Vantaa	20	4	7	9	21	41	−20	19	
9	RoU, Helsinki	20	4	5	11	36	64	−28	17	
10	SUMU, Helsinki	20	4	5	11	22	54	−32	17	Relegated
11	PP FC, Helsinki	20	2	6	12	27	60	−33	12	Relegated

==== Section 3 ====
Pos	Team	Pld	W	D	L	GF	GA	GD	Pts	Qualification or relegation
1	FC Futura, Porvoo	22	15	5	2	63	20	+43	50	Promotion Playoff Group A
2	Pato, Tervakoski	22	14	4	4	55	36	+19	46	
3	MPS, Helsinki	22	14	3	5	71	24	+47	45	
4	Gnistan/Ogeli, Helsinki	22	10	4	8	46	37	+9	34	
5	PPV, Helsinki	22	9	3	10	52	49	+3	30	
6	FC POHU, Helsinki	22	8	5	9	40	44	−4	29	
7	Kifen 2, Helsinki	22	8	3	11	32	37	−5	27	
8	AC Vantaa	22	6	8	8	52	50	+2	26	
9	Zyklon, Helsinki	22	6	8	8	40	40	0	26	
10	RIlves, Riihimäki	22	5	7	10	39	50	−11	22	
11	PK-50, Vantaa	22	6	4	12	41	71	−30	22	Relegated
12	Team KäPa, Helsinki	22	3	2	17	23	96	−73	11	Relegated

=== South-East Finland, Kaakkois-Suomi ===
Pos	Team	Pld	W	D	L	GF	GA	GD	Pts	Qualification or relegation
1	Kajo, Valkeala	20	15	2	3	72	20	+52	47	Promotion Playoff Group C
2	STPS, Savonlinna	20	14	2	4	58	29	+29	44	
3	KTP, Kotka	20	13	1	6	69	24	+45	40	
4	PEPO, Lappeenranta	20	11	4	5	65	36	+29	37	
5	SavU, Mikkeli	20	11	3	6	40	25	+15	36	
6	HP-47, Heinola	20	8	2	10	48	48	0	26	
7	FC PaSa, Imatra	20	7	3	10	28	41	−13	24	
8	PeKa, Kotka	20	7	1	12	27	53	−26	22	
9	SiU, Simpele	20	4	5	11	30	62	−32	17	
10	HaPK, Hamina	20	5	2	13	22	60	−38	17	Relegated
11	HiHa, Hiirola	20	1	3	16	20	81	−61	6	Relegated

=== Central Finland, Keski-Suomi ===
Pos	Team	Pld	W	D	L	GF	GA	GD	Pts	Qualification or relegation
1	FC Vaajakoski	22	20	1	1	135	20	+115	61	Promotion Playoff Group C
2	PaRi, Palokka	22	17	4	1	62	18	+44	55	
3	JIlves, Jämsänkoski	22	12	2	8	51	39	+12	38	
4	JJK Jyväskylä II	22	10	5	7	64	54	+10	35	
5	HuKi Jyväskylä	22	10	2	10	57	72	−15	32	
6	Pamaus, Laukaa	22	8	6	8	53	49	+4	30	
7	LPK, Jyväskylä	22	8	4	10	45	64	−19	28	
8	JPS, Jyväskylä	22	7	4	11	47	63	−16	25	
9	KeuPa, Keuruu	22	6	6	10	40	66	−26	24	
10	BET, Jyväskylä	22	6	5	11	48	69	−21	23	
11	KaDy, Jyväskylä	22	5	1	16	46	72	−26	16	Relegated
12	KaPa-51, Kangasniemi	22	1	4	17	25	87	−62	7	Relegated

==== Relegation playoff ====
First Leg

FCV/Reds 2-2 JPS

Second Leg

JPS 3-0 FCV/Reds

JPS remain at fourth level.

=== Eastern Finland, Itä-Suomi ===
Pos	Team	Pld	W	D	L	GF	GA	GD	Pts	Qualification or relegation
1	KuPS 2, Kuopio	22	21	0	1	116	15	+101	63	Promotion Playoff Group C
2	SaPa, Pieksämäki	22	16	3	3	67	21	+46	51	
3	Zulimanit, Kuopio	22	15	3	4	82	35	+47	48	
4	SC KuFu-98	22	14	2	6	64	32	+32	44	
5	SuPa, Suonenjoki	22	9	3	10	64	32	+32	30	
6	KiuPa, Kiuruvesi	22	9	2	11	55	63	−8	29	
7	SiPS, Siilinäjrvi	22	9	0	13	47	53	−6	27	
8	PAVE, Iisalmi	22	8	2	12	42	56	−14	26	
9	JoPS, Joensuu	22	7	1	14	39	80	−41	22	
10	KuKi, Kurkimäki	22	6	2	14	36	59	−23	20	Relegated
11	JuPS, Juuka	22	4	1	17	37	114	−77	13	Relegated
12	NP-H, Nilsiä	22	3	3	16	25	83	−58	12	Relegated

=== Northern Finland, Pohjois-Suomi ===
==== Oulu/Kainuu ====
Pos	Team	Pld	W	D	L	GF	GA	GD	Pts	Qualification or relegation
1	Dreeverit, Oulu	16	13	3	0	65	10	+55	42	Playoff
2	FC Raahe	16	10	2	4	41	20	+21	32	
3	FC Kurenpojat, Pudasjärvi	16	8	3	5	46	25	+21	27	
4	HauPa, Haukipudas	16	8	3	5	52	38	+14	27	
5	OuJK, Oulu	16	8	2	6	43	29	+14	26	Relegation Playoff
6	FC Tarmo, Kajaani	16	6	3	7	45	27	+18	21	Relegation Playoff
7	KaPePo, Kajaani	16	5	2	9	24	38	−14	17	Relegated
8	FC Kanuunat, Kajaani	16	2	2	12	19	85	−66	8	Relegated
9	KeP-77, Kempele	16	2	0	14	14	77	−63	6	Relegated

==== Lapland, Lappi ====
Pos	Team	Pld	W	D	L	GF	GA	GD	Pts	Qualification or relegation
1	FC-88, Kemi	14	10	2	2	57	12	+45	32	Playoff
2	FC Santa Claus, Rovaniemi	14	9	3	2	50	29	+21	30	
3	Kontio, Kolari	14	9	0	5	46	26	+20	27	
4	FC Lynx, Rovaniemi	14	8	2	4	30	19	+11	26	
5	Roi United, Rovaniemi	14	6	1	7	34	35	−1	19	Relegation Playoff
6	KauPa, Kittilä	14	5	0	9	18	27	−9	15	Relegation Playoff
7	FC Muurola	14	3	2	9	18	54	−36	11	Relegated
8	TePs, Tervola	14	1	0	13	24	75	−51	3	Relegated

==== Pohjois-Suomi Playoff ====
First Leg

FC-88 1-3 Dreeverit

Second Leg

Dreeverit 2-0 FC-88

Dreeverit to Promotion Playoff Group D.

=== Central Ostrobothnia, Keski-Pohjanmaa ===
==== Preliminary stage ====
Pos	Team	Pld	W	D	L	GF	GA	GD	Pts	Qualification
1	Öja-73	11	9	1	1	37	14	+23	28	Promotion Playoff
2	NIK, Uusikaarlepyy	11	7	2	2	31	11	+20	23	Promotion Playoff
3	GBK II, Kokkola	11	7	1	3	27	20	+7	22	Promotion Playoff
4	Jaro II, Pietarsaari	11	6	2	3	26	11	+15	20	Promotion Playoff
5	Esse IK	11	6	1	4	18	20	−2	19	Promotion Playoff
6	OuHu, Oulainen	11	5	1	5	23	24	−1	16	Promotion Playoff
7	PeFF, Pedersöre	11	4	1	6	19	20	−1	13	Relegation Playoff
8	KPS, Kokkola	11	4	1	6	18	22	−4	13	Relegation Playoff
9	Reima, Kokkola	11	3	3	5	11	21	−10	12	Relegation Playoff
10	LoVe, Lohtaja	11	2	3	6	13	26	−13	9	Relegation Playoff
11	IK Myran, Alaveteli	11	2	1	8	12	29	−17	7	Relegation Playoff
12	HBK, Kruunupyy	11	0	5	6	17	34	−17	5	Relegation Playoff

==== Relegation playoff Group ====
Pos	Team	Pld	W	D	L	GF	GA	GD	Pts	Qualification or relegation
7	Reima, Kokkola	21	11	4	6	47	33	+14	37	
8	PeFF, Pedersöre	21	10	2	9	48	35	+13	32	
9	LoVe, Lohtaja	21	6	5	10	30	38	−8	23	
10	IK Myran, Alaveteli	21	6	4	11	35	50	−15	22	
11	KPS, Kokkola	21	6	1	14	30	59	−29	19	Relegation Playoff
12	HBK, Kruunupyy	21	2	6	13	33	65	−32	12	Relegated

(preliminary stage points included)

==== Relegation playoff ====
First Leg

VetU 3-2 KPS

Second Leg

KPS 6-2 VetU

KPS remain at fourth level.

=== Vaasa ===
==== Preliminary stage ====
Pos	Team	Pld	W	D	L	GF	GA	GD	Pts	Qualification
1	Norrvalla FF, Vöyri	11	8	1	2	32	15	+17	25	Promotion Playoff
2	VPV, Vaasa	11	7	0	4	26	25	+1	21	Promotion Playoff
3	FC KOMU, Mustasaari	11	6	1	4	24	18	+6	19	Promotion Playoff
4	Sepsi-78, Seinäjoki	11	5	3	3	22	13	+9	18	Promotion Playoff
5	Sundom IF	11	5	2	4	18	18	0	17	Promotion Playoff
6	IK, Ilmajoki	11	5	1	5	14	19	−5	16	Promotion Playoff
7	NuPa, Nurmo	11	3	5	3	21	23	−2	14	Relegation Playoff
8	Sporting, Kristiinankaupunki	11	4	2	5	17	21	−4	14	Relegation Playoff
9	Karhu, Kauhajoki	11	4	1	6	28	30	−2	13	Relegation Playoff
10	FC Kuffen, Mustasaari	11	4	0	7	33	37	−4	12	Relegation Playoff
11	PeIK, Maalahti	11	3	2	6	16	22	−6	11	Relegation Playoff
12	VäVi, Vähäkyrö	11	2	2	7	16	26	−10	8	Relegation Playoff

==== Relegation playoff Group ====
Pos	Team	Pld	W	D	L	GF	GA	GD	Pts	Relegation
7	Sporting, Kristiinankaupunki	10	6	1	3	30	13	+17	33	
8	PeIK, Maalahti	10	6	1	3	37	18	+19	30	
9	NuPa, Nurmo	10	4	3	3	19	17	+2	29	
10	Karhu, Kauhajoki	10	4	2	4	20	24	−4	27	
11	FC Kuffen, Mustasaari	10	4	1	5	26	27	−1	25	Relegated
12	VäVi, Vähäkyrö	10	2	0	8	7	40	−33	14	Relegated

(preliminary stage points included)

=== Vaasa/Central Ostrobothnia Promotion Playoff Group ===
Pos	Team	Pld	W	D	L	GF	GA	GD	Pts	Qualification
1	Öja-73	11	9	1	1	45	12	+33	28	Withdraw
2	NIK, Uusikaarlepyy	11	7	2	2	23	13	+10	23	Withdraw
3	Sepsi-78, Seinäjoki	11	6	2	3	35	19	+16	20	Promotion Playoff Group D
4	Sundom IF	11	5	4	2	21	15	+6	19	Withdraw
5	Jaro II, Pietarsaari	11	5	3	3	21	21	0	18	Promotion Playoff Group D
6	GBK II, Kokkola	11	4	4	3	24	22	+2	16	
7	Norrvalla FF, Vöyri	11	5	1	5	25	30	−5	16	
8	FC KOMU, Mustasaari	11	3	4	4	23	24	−1	13	
9	VPV, Vaasa	11	3	4	4	23	26	−3	13	
10	Esse IK	11	2	2	7	15	28	−13	8	
11	IK, Ilmajoki	11	1	3	7	16	32	−16	6	
12	OuHu, Oulainen	11	0	2	9	19	48	−29	2	

NB: Öja-73, NIK and Sundom IF withdrew from Promotion Playoff and then Sepsi-78 and Jaro II took their places.

=== Satakunta ===
Pos	Team	Pld	W	D	L	GF	GA	GD	Pts	Qualification or relegation
1	PoPa, Pori	18	14	2	2	65	16	+49	44	Promotion Playoff Group B
2	FC Rauma 2	18	12	1	5	51	24	+27	37	
3	TOVE, Pori	18	9	4	5	46	26	+20	31	
4	Nasta, Nakkila	18	9	1	8	49	41	+8	28	
5	VAlku, Ulvila	18	8	1	9	37	47	−10	25	
6	KaPa, Kankaanpää	18	5	5	8	36	51	−15	20	
7	RKV, Rauma	18	6	2	10	31	47	−16	20	
8	RuosV, Pori	18	4	6	8	24	37	−13	18	
9	Musa 2, Pori	18	5	3	10	18	38	−20	18	
10	MInto, Merikarvia	18	4	3	11	27	57	−30	15	Relegated

=== Tampere ===
Pos	Team	Pld	W	D	L	GF	GA	GD	Pts	Qualification or relegation
1	PS-44, Valkeakoski	22	15	4	3	76	23	+53	49	Promotion Playoff Group B
2	FC Tigers, Tampere	22	13	5	4	75	34	+41	44	
3	VaKP, Valkeakoski	22	13	4	5	51	26	+25	43	
4	Ilves, Tampere	22	12	5	5	48	33	+15	41	
5	TP-49, Toijala	22	8	5	9	51	43	+8	29	
6	NoPy, Nokia	22	8	5	9	34	42	−8	29	
7	Loiske, Lempäälä	22	8	4	10	41	52	−11	28	
8	KaVo, Kangasala	22	8	2	12	35	46	−11	26	
9	PP-70 2, Tampere	22	8	1	13	35	60	−25	25	
10	ErHu, Valkeakoski	22	7	1	14	37	53	−16	22	
11	NoPS, Nokia	22	5	5	12	25	57	−32	20	Relegated
12	ViiPV, Viiala	22	4	5	13	23	61	−38	17	Relegated

==== Relegation playoff ====
Härmä 5-0 FC Vapsi

Härmä promoted, FC Vapsi relegated.

=== Turku and Åland, Turku and Ahvenanmaa ===
Pos	Team	Pld	W	D	L	GF	GA	GD	Pts	Qualification or relegation
1	SoVo, Somero	22	18	1	3	85	30	+55	55	Promotion Playoff Group B
2	ÅIFK, Turku	22	12	5	5	65	33	+32	41	
3	FC Boda, Dragsfjärd	22	11	4	7	52	38	+14	37	
4	TuTo, Turku	22	11	4	7	58	51	+7	37	
5	IFFK, Finström	22	10	5	7	40	36	+4	35	
6	JyTy, Turku	22	10	3	9	50	45	+5	33	
7	Vilpas, Salo	22	10	3	9	38	41	−3	33	
8	KaaRe, Kaarina	22	10	2	10	51	50	+1	32	
9	TPK, Turku	22	7	3	12	53	58	−5	24	
10	UPK, Uusikaupunki	22	6	3	13	50	78	−28	21	
11	Lieto	22	5	2	15	40	81	−41	17	Relegated
12	LTU, Littoinen	22	3	3	16	19	60	−41	12	Relegated

=== Promotion Playoff ===
==== Promotion Playoff Group A ====
Round 1

GrIFK 0-0 Futura
Ponnistus bye

Round 2

Futura 2-0 Ponnistus
GrIFK bye

Round 3

Ponnistus 0-3 GrIFK
Futura bye

Final Table:

Pos	Team	Pld	W	D	L	GF	GA	GD	Pts	Promotion or qualification
1	GrIFK, Kauniainen	2	1	1	0	3	0	+3	4	Promoted
2	FC Futura, Porvoo	2	1	1	0	2	0	+2	4	Promotion Playoff
3	Ponnistus, Helsinki	2	0	0	2	0	5	−5	0	Promotion Playoff

==== Promotion Playoff Group B ====
Round 1

PoPa 1-1 PS-44
SoVo bye

Round 2

SoVo 3-2 PoPa
PS-44 bye

Round 3

PS-44 1-3 SoVo
PoPa bye

Final Table:

Pos	Team	Pld	W	D	L	GF	GA	GD	Pts	Promotion or qualification
1	SoVo, Somero	2	2	0	0	6	3	+3	6	Promoted
2	PoPa, Pori	2	0	1	1	3	4	−1	1	Promoted
3	PS-44, Valkeakoski	2	0	1	1	2	4	−2	1	Promotion Playoff

==== Promotion Playoff Group C ====
Round 1

FCV 2-1 KuPS II
Kajo bye

Round 2

KuPS II 3-1 Kajo
FCV bye

Round 3

Kajo 2-0 FCV
KuPS II bye

Final Table:

Pos	Team	Pld	W	D	L	GF	GA	GD	Pts	Promotion or qualification
1	KuPS II, Kuopio	2	1	0	1	4	3	+1	3	Promoted
2	Kajo, Valkeala	2	1	0	1	3	3	0	3	Promoted
3	FC Vaajakoski	2	1	0	1	2	3	−1	3	Promotion Playoff

==== Promotion Playoff Group D ====
Round 1

Dreeverit 5-0 Jaro II
Sepsi-78 bye

Round 2

Jaro II 1-2 Sepsi-78
Dreeverit bye

Round 3

Sepsi-78 0-1 Dreeverit
Jaro II bye

Final Table:

Pos	Team	Pld	W	D	L	GF	GA	GD	Pts	Promotion or qualification
1	Dreeverit, Oulu	2	2	0	0	6	0	+6	6	Promoted
2	Sepsi-78, Seinäjoki	2	1	0	1	2	2	0	3	Promoted
3	Jaro II, Pietarsaari	2	0	0	2	1	7	−6	0	Promotion Playoff

=== Division Two/Division Three Playoffs ===
First Legs

PS-44 3-2 TKT
Jaro II 2-2 Tervarit
Futura 1-5 KäPa
Ponnistus 2-0 Pantterit
FCV 1-3 KajHa

Second Legs

TKT 4-1 PS-44
Pantterit 3-1 Ponnistus
Tervarit 5-2 Jaro II
KäPa 3-1 Futura
KajHa 6-1 FCV

Ponnistus promoted, Pantterit relegated.
TKT, Tervarit, KäPa and KajHa remain at third level.

== References and sources ==
- Finnish FA
- ResultCode
