= 2026 Kuopion Palloseura season =

Kuopion Palloseura
2026 season
- Chairman: Vesa Kauppila
- Manager: (Finland) Miika Nuutinen
- Stadium: Kuopio Football Stadium
- Finnish Cup: Quarter-finals
- UEFA Champions League: Second qualifying round
- UEFA Europa League: Third qualifying round
Home colours	Away colours	Third colours

The 2026 season is the 103rd season in the history of Kuopion Palloseura. During this season the club will be participating in the following competitions: Veikkausliiga, Finnish Cup, UEFA Champions League, UEFA Europa League, UEFA Conference League.

== Current squad ==
As of 28 August 2026

Note: Flags indicate national team as defined under FIFA eligibility rules; some limited exceptions apply. Players may hold more than one non-FIFA nationality.

No.	Pos.	Nation	Player
1	GK	AUT	Johannes Kreidl
3	DF	FIN	Saku Heiskanen
4	DF	GHA	Kasim Nuhu
6	DF	FIN	Saku Savolainen
7	MF	FIN	Jerry Voutilainen
8	MF	FIN	Petteri Pennanen
9	FW	SWE	Gustav Engvall
10	MF	ARG	Valentín Gasc
11	FW	NCA	Jaime Moreno
12	GK	FIN	Hemmo Riihimäki
13	MF	FIN	Niilo Kujasalo
14	MF	FIN	Samuel Pasanen
15	MF	FRA	Ayman Aiki
16	MF	FIN	Tommi Jyry
17	MF	FIN	Arttu Heinonen
18	MF	FIN	Eemil Tanninen

No.	Pos.	Nation	Player
19	FW	UGA	Calvin Kabuye
20	FW	POL	Piotr Parzyszek
21	FW	FIN	Joslyn Luyeye-Lutumba
22	MF	GAM	Saikou Touray
23	DF	FIN	Arttu Lötjönen
24	DF	GHA	Bob Nii Armah
25	DF	GHA	Clinton Antwi
26	MF	FIN	Aaro Toivonen
28	DF	FRA	Brahima Magassa
29	DF	FIN	Akseli Puukko
30	DF	POR	Jorginho
32	DF	FIN	Rasmus Tikkanen
33	DF	FIN	Taneli Hämäläinen
34	MF	DEN	Julius Eskesen
37	GK	FIN	Kasperi Silen

=== Out on loan ===
Note: Flags indicate national team as defined under FIFA eligibility rules; some limited exceptions apply. Players may hold more than one non-FIFA nationality.

No.	Pos.	Nation	Player
2	DF	SWE	Karl Ward (at IFK Mariehamn until 31 December 2026)

== Friendlies ==
31 January 2026 Friendly	KuPS (Finland)	3–1	(Finland) VPS	Kuopio
15:00	Touré 39' 79'; Gasc (yellow card) 45+1'; Pennanen 65'		van Duivenbooden 62'; Lindholm (yellow card) 77'	Stadium: Väre Areena; Attendance: 102; Referee: (Finland) Kalle Nummela

7 February 2026 Friendly	SJK (Finland)	3–0	(Finland) KuPS	Seinäjoki
15:00	Streng 5' 43' 56'; Pires (yellow card) 90+1'		Tatu Hukkanen (yellow card) 67'; Niilo Mattila (yellow card) 88'	Stadium: OmaSP Stadion; Attendance: 246; Referee: (Finland) Amir Hajizadeh

14 February 2026 Friendly	KuPS (Finland)	0–1	(Finland) Ilves	Kuopio
	Ruoppi (yellow card) 48'; Joni Kivijärvi (yellow card) 49'		Hytönen 2'; Kumpu (yellow card) 20'	Stadium: Väre Areena; Attendance: 315; Referee: (Finland) Miikka Haapakoski

22 February 2026 Friendly	KuPS (Finland)	3–4	(Finland) FF Jaro	Kuopio
	Tatu Hukkanen (yellow card) 40'; Roopert Tahkola 59' (yellow card) 87'; Daniel Huttunen 61'; Joni Kivijärvi 64'		Herman Sjögrell 36'; Vikström 52' 81' 90+3'	Stadium: Väre Areena

== Competitions ==
=== Overall record ===
Competition	First match	Last match	Starting round	Final position	Record							
Competition	First match	Last match	Starting round	Final position	Pld	W	D	L	GF	GA	GD	Win %
Veikkausliiga	4 April 2026	8 November 2026	Matchday 1		30	14	11	5	46	29	+17	46.67
Finnish Cup	12 May 2026	10 June 2026	Fifth round	Quarter Finals	3	2	0	1	7	5	+2	66.67
UEFA Champions League	7 July 2026	28 July 2026	First qualifying round	Second qualifying round	4	1	0	3	4	6	−2	25.00
UEFA Europa League	6 August 2026	13 August 2026	Third qualifying round	Third qualifying round	2	0	1	1	2	3	−1	0.00
UEFA Conference League	20 August 2026		Play off Round		4	1	1	2	4	7	−3	25.00
Total					43	18	13	12	63	50	+13	41.86

Last updated: 30 October 2026
Source: Soccerway

=== Veikkausliiga ===
==== League table ====
Pos	Team	Pld	W	D	L	GF	GA	GD	Pts	Qualification
1	KuPS	22	12	7	3	38	23	+15	43	Qualification for the Championship Round
2	Inter Turku	22	11	9	2	29	16	+13	42	Qualification for the Championship Round
3	HJK	22	11	4	7	36	27	+9	37	Qualification for the Championship Round
4	IF Gnistan	22	10	6	6	36	29	+7	36	Qualification for the Championship Round
5	AC Oulu	22	10	4	8	25	25	0	34	Qualification for the Championship Round

Source: Flashscore
Rules for classification: 1) Points; 2) Goal difference; 3) Goals scored; 4) Head-to-head points; 5) Head-to-head goal difference; 6) Head-to-head away goals scored; 7) Play-off
(Note: Play-off is only played if need to decide champion, teams for relegation or UEFA competition and will be played on a neutral ground).

Pos	Team	Pld	W	D	L	GF	GA	GD	Pts	Qualification
1	Inter Turku (C)	32	17	10	5	43	27	+16	61	Qualification for the Champions League first qualifying round
2	HJK	32	17	8	7	66	39	+27	59	Qualification for the Conference League second qualifying round (Note: Inter Turku qualified for the Conference League second qualifying round as the 2026 Finnish Cup winners. Since they won the championship, the spot passed to the second-placed team.)
3	KuPS	32	14	11	7	46	33	+13	53	Qualification for the Conference League first qualifying round
4	AC Oulu	32	14	6	12	41	40	+1	48	Qualification for the Conference League first qualifying round
5	IF Gnistan	32	12	10	10	52	47	+5	46	

Source: Flashscore
Rules for classification: 1) Points; 2) Goal difference; 3) Goals scored; 4) Head-to-head points; 5) Head-to-head goal difference; 6) Head-to-head away goals scored; 7) Play-off
(Note: Play-off is only played if need to decide champion, teams for relegation or UEFA competition and will be played on a neutral ground).
(C) Champions
Notes:

Pos	Team	Pld	W	D	L	GF	GA	GD	Pts	Qualification or relegation
1	FC Lahti	27	11	6	10	35	26	+9	39	
2	Ilves	27	11	5	11	45	39	+6	38	
3	TPS	27	8	8	11	29	33	−4	32	
4	SJK	27	6	9	12	29	37	−8	27	
5	FF Jaro (O)	27	4	9	14	22	49	−27	21	Qualification for the Veikkausliiga play-off
6	IFK Mariehamn (R)	27	4	7	16	22	49	−27	19	Relegation to the 2027 Ykkösliiga

Source: Flashscore
Rules for classification: 1) Points; 2) Goal difference; 3) Goals scored; 4) Head-to-head points; 5) Head-to-head goal difference; 6) Head-to-head away goals scored; 7) Play-off
(Note: Play-off is only played if need to decide champion, teams for relegation or UEFA competition and will be played on a neutral ground).
(O) Play-off winners; (R) Relegated

==== Results summary ====
Overall								Home						Away					
Pld	W	D	L	GF	GA	GD	Pts	W	D	L	GF	GA	GD	W	D	L	GF	GA	GD
0	0	0	0	0	0	0	0	0	0	0	0	0	0	0	0	0	0	0	0

==== Results by round ====
Round	1
Ground	
Result	
Position	

A = Away; H = Home; W = Win; D = Draw; L = Loss

==== Matches ====
4 April 2026 1	Ilves	1–3	KuPS	Tampere
16:00	Kanga (yellow card) 45+1'; Hytönen 90+2'	Report	Pennanen 12'; Moreno 43'; Armah 57'	Stadium: Tammelan Stadion; Attendance: 4,774; Referee: (Finland) Oliver Reitala

11 April 2026 2	KuPS	1–0	Gnistan	Kuopio
13:00	Moreno 81'	Report		Stadium: Väre Areena; Attendance: 3,108; Referee: (Finland) Matti Roth

18 April 2026 3	Jaro	1–1	KuPS	Jakobstad
16:00	Vikström 40' (pen.)	Report	Gasc (yellow card) 77'; Moreno 90'	Stadium: Project Liv Arena; Attendance: 1,786; Referee: (Finland) Antti Munukka

22 April 2026 14	KuPS	3–2	Oulu	Kuopio
18:00	Armah 5'; Moreno 47'; Otto Ruoppi 77'	Report	Karjalainen 44' (pen.) 64'	Stadium: Väre Areena; Attendance: 2,610; Referee: (Finland) Mohammad Al-Emara

26 April 2026 4	KuPS	1–1	HJK	Kuopio
16:00	Otto Ruoppi 2'; Armah (yellow card) 68'	Report	Bogićević (yellow card) 35'; Marković (yellow card) 43'; Borchers 47'	Stadium: Väre Areena; Attendance: 2,881; Referee: (Finland) Joni Hyytiä

2 May 2026 5	Oulu	2–0	KuPS	Oulu
19:00	Karjalainen 4'; Pirinen (yellow card) 20'; Ghezali 71'	Report	Antwi (yellow card) 52'; Armah (yellow card) 61' (red card) 88'; Magassa (yellow card) 68'	Stadium: Raatti Stadium; Attendance: 2,869; Referee: (Finland) Oliver Reitala

8 May 2026 6	KuPS	0–0	SJK	Kuopio
19:00	Lötjönen (yellow card) 84'	Report	Yussif (yellow card) 42'; Pires (yellow card) 52'; Rangel (yellow card) 56'; Tessilimi (yellow card) 65'; Paunio (red card) 88'	Stadium: Väre Areena; Attendance: 2,908; Referee: (Finland) Antti Munukka

8 May 2026 7	IFK Mariehamn	1–1	KuPS	Mariehamn
19:00	Dahlström (yellow card) 19'; Huttunen 42'	Report	Luyeye-Lutumba 35'; Gasc (yellow card) 54'	Stadium: Wiklöf Holding Arena; Attendance: 961; Referee: (Finland) Joona Kontinen

20 May 2026 15	KuPS	3–0	FF Jaro	Kuopio
18:00	Armah 34' 50'; Gasc 86'	Report	Myrevik (yellow card) 71'	Stadium: Väre Areena; Attendance: 3,040; Referee: (Finland) Joni Hyytiä

23 May 2026 8	KuPS	2–1	FC Lahti	Kuopio
16:00	Ruoppi 36' (pen.); Magassa 45'	Report	Koskinen 1' (yellow card) 25'; Vehkonen (yellow card) 34'; Sans (yellow card) 34'; Heikkinen (yellow card) 63'	Stadium: Väre Areena; Attendance: 2,882; Referee: (Finland) Oliver Reitala

30 May 2026 9	KuPS	1-1	Inter Turku	Kuopio
16:00	Moreno 61'; Armah (yellow card) 66'; Gasc (yellow card) 68'	Report	Conteh 54'; Essomba (yellow card) 56'; Jephta (yellow card) 76'; Saarinen (yellow card) 90+2'	Stadium: Väre Areena; Attendance: 2,884; Referee: (Finland) Dennis Antamo

13 June 2026 10	VPS	1-1	KuPS	Vaasa
16:00	Smyth 14' (yellow card) 43'; Daoussi (yellow card) 62'; Turfkruier (yellow card) 75'	Report	Kasim Nuhu (yellow card) 25'; Moreno (yellow card) 35' (goal) 72' (pen.); Lötjönen (yellow card) 40'; Magassa (red card) 82'; Gasc (yellow card) 87'	Stadium: Lemonsoft Stadion; Attendance: 2,397; Referee: (Finland) Peiman Simani

17 June 2026 11	TPS	1-2	KuPS	Turku
17:00	Pau Juvanteny (yellow card) 49'; Ivanovic 78'; Anini Junior (yellow card) 90+1'; Ivan Piñol (yellow card) 90+3'	Report	Hämäläinen (yellow card) 19'; Ruoppi 29'; Moreno 72'	Stadium: Veritas Stadion; Attendance: 2,857; Referee: (Finland) Mohammad Al-Emara

=== Finnish Cup ===
12 May 2026 Fifth round	PK-35	0–2	KuPS	Helsinki
18:00	João Costa (yellow card) 21'; Jasper Pikkuhookana (yellow card) 86'	Report	Engvall 61'; Kabuye 67'; Hämäläinen (yellow card) 75'	Stadium: Markku.fi Areena; Attendance: 756; Referee: (Finland) Matti Roth

26 May 2026 Sixth round	JäPS	0–1	KuPS	Järvenpää
17:30	Heidari (yellow card) 42'; Peetu Haikonen (yellow card) 84'	Report	Ruoppi 72'; Heiskanen (yellow card) 90+2'	Stadium: Keskusurheilukenttä TN; Attendance: 1,451; Referee: (Finland) Juuso Vuorinen

10 June 2026 Quarter-finals	KuPS	0–0 (4-5 p)	VPS	Kuopio
16:00		Report	Daoussi (yellow card) 61'; Lima (yellow card) 72'; Niemi (yellow card) 90+3'	Stadium: Väre Areena; Attendance: 1,214; Referee: (Finland) Antti Munukka

=== First qualifying round ===
First leg	–

Second leg	–

=== Second qualifying round ===
First leg	–

Second leg	–

=== Third qualifying round ===
First leg	–

Second leg	–

== Play-off round ==
First leg	–

Second leg	–

== League phase ==
=== Table ===
The top eight ranked teams receive a bye to the round of 16. Teams ranked from 9th to 24th contested the knockout phase play-offs, with the teams ranked from 9th to 16th seeded for the draw, while those ranked 17th to 24th were not. Teams ranked from 25th to 36th are eliminated from European competition.

Pos	Team	Pld	W	D	L	GF	GA	GD	Pts	Qualification
1	(Switzerland) Lugano	3	3	0	0	11	4	+7	9	Advance to round of 16 (seeded)
2	(Greece) Panathinaikos	3	3	0	0	9	3	+6	9	Advance to round of 16 (seeded)
3	(Netherlands) Twente	3	3	0	0	8	2	+6	9	Advance to round of 16 (seeded)
4	(France) Monaco	3	3	0	0	7	1	+6	9	Advance to round of 16 (seeded)
5	(England) Brighton & Hove Albion	3	2	1	0	5	0	+5	7	Advance to round of 16 (seeded)
6	(Norway) Brann	3	2	1	0	7	3	+4	7	Advance to round of 16 (seeded)
7	(Denmark) Copenhagen	3	2	1	0	7	3	+4	7	Advance to round of 16 (seeded)
8	(Romania) Universitatea Craiova	3	2	1	0	6	2	+4	7	Advance to round of 16 (seeded)
9	(Sweden) Mjällby AIF	3	2	1	0	5	1	+4	7	Advance to knockout phase play-offs (seeded)
10	(Belgium) Sint-Truiden	3	2	1	0	4	1	+3	7	Advance to knockout phase play-offs (seeded)
11	(Netherlands) Ajax	3	2	0	1	9	3	+6	6	Advance to knockout phase play-offs (seeded)
12	(Turkey) Trabzonspor	3	2	0	1	6	3	+3	6	Advance to knockout phase play-offs (seeded)
13	(Croatia) Hajduk Split	3	2	0	1	3	2	+1	6	Advance to knockout phase play-offs (seeded)
14	(Germany) SC Freiburg	3	2	0	1	4	5	−1	6	Advance to knockout phase play-offs (seeded)
15	(Serbia) Red Star Belgrade	3	1	1	1	6	6	0	4	Advance to knockout phase play-offs (seeded)
16	(Italy) Atalanta	3	1	1	1	4	4	0	4	Advance to knockout phase play-offs (seeded)
17	(Portugal) Braga	3	1	1	1	2	3	−1	4	Advance to knockout phase play-offs (unseeded)
18	(Belgium) Gent	3	1	1	1	1	2	−1	4	Advance to knockout phase play-offs (unseeded)
19	(Latvia) Riga	3	0	3	0	3	3	0	3	Advance to knockout phase play-offs (unseeded)
20	(Switzerland) Thun	3	1	0	2	3	3	0	3	Advance to knockout phase play-offs (unseeded)
21	(Bosnia and Herzegovina) Borac Banja Luka	3	1	0	2	3	4	−1	3	Advance to knockout phase play-offs (unseeded)
22	(Gibraltar) Lincoln Red Imps	3	1	0	2	3	6	−3	3	Advance to knockout phase play-offs (unseeded)
23	(Czech Republic) Jablonec	3	0	2	1	3	4	−1	2	Advance to knockout phase play-offs (unseeded)
24	(Denmark) AGF	3	0	2	1	1	2	−1	2	Advance to knockout phase play-offs (unseeded)
25	(Denmark) Nordsjælland	3	0	2	1	3	5	−2	2	
26	(Albania) Egnatia	3	0	2	1	2	4	−2	2	
27	(Kazakhstan) Kairat	3	0	2	1	3	7	−4	2	
28	(Bulgaria) CSKA Sofia	3	0	1	2	4	6	−2	1	
29	(Georgia (country)) Iberia 1999	3	0	1	2	2	5	−3	1	
30	(Cyprus) Pafos	3	0	1	2	3	7	−4	1	
31	(Spain) Getafe	3	0	1	2	3	7	−4	1	
32	(Scotland) Heart of Midlothian	3	0	1	2	2	6	−4	1	
33	(Finland) KuPS	3	0	1	2	2	6	−4	1	
34	(Denmark) Midtjylland	3	0	1	2	2	8	−6	1	
35	(Andorra) Inter Club d'Escaldes	3	0	0	3	2	7	−5	0	
36	(Lithuania) Kauno Žalgiris	3	0	0	3	1	11	−10	0	

Updated to match(es) played on 5 November 2026. Source: UEFA
Rules for classification: League phase tiebreakers
