= 2026–27 UEFA Champions League qualifying =

Football tournament qualification stage

The 2026–27 UEFA Champions League qualifying phase and play-off round began on 7 July and ended on 26 August 2026.

A total of 52 teams competed in the qualifying system of the 2026–27 UEFA Champions League, which included the qualifying phase and the play-off round. Of these, 42 teams competed in the Champions Path and 10 in the League Path. The seven winners of the play-off round—five from the Champions Path and two from the League Path—advanced to the league phase, where they joined the 29 teams that had already entered the league phase.

Times are CEST (UTC+2), as listed by UEFA (local times, if different, are in parentheses).

== Format ==
The qualifying phase and play-off round were split into two paths – the Champions Path and the League Path. The Champions Path contained teams which qualified as the winners of their domestic league, and the League Path contained teams which qualified as runners-up, third-placed or fourth-placed teams from their domestic league.

Each tie was played over two legs, with each team playing one leg at home. The team that scored more goals on aggregate over the two legs advanced to the next round. If the aggregate score was level at the end of normal time of the second leg, extra time was played, and if the same number of goals was scored by both teams during extra time, the tie was determined by a penalty shoot-out.

In the draws for each round, teams were seeded based on their UEFA club coefficients at the beginning of the season, with the teams divided into seeded and unseeded pots containing the same number of teams. A seeded team was drawn against an unseeded team, with the order of legs in each tie decided by draw. As the identity of the winners of the previous round may not have been known at the time of the draws, the seeding was carried out under the assumption that the team with the higher coefficient of an undecided tie advanced to the subsequent round, which meant if the team with the lower coefficient advanced, it simply took the seeding of its opponent. Prior to the draws, UEFA could form "groups" in accordance with the principles set by the Club Competitions Committee purely for the convenience of the draw and not to resemble any real groupings in the sense of the competition. Teams from associations with political conflicts as decided by UEFA could not be drawn into the same tie. After the draws, the order of legs of a tie could be reversed by UEFA due to scheduling or venue conflicts.

== Schedule ==
The schedule of the competition was as follows.

Schedule for 2026–27 UEFA Champions League qualifying phase and play-off round
Round	Draw date	First leg	Second leg
First qualifying round	16 June 2026	7–8 July 2026	14–15 July 2026
Second qualifying round	17 June 2026	21–22 July 2026	28–29 July 2026
Third qualifying round	20 July 2026	4–5 August 2026	11 August 2026
Play-off round	3 August 2026	18–19 August 2026	25–26 August 2026

== Teams ==
The information below reflects Russia's ongoing suspension from UEFA.

=== Champions Path ===
The Champions Path included all league champions which did not qualify directly for the league phase and consisted of the following rounds:

- First qualifying round (28 teams): 28 teams which entered in this round.
- Second qualifying round (24 teams): 10 teams which entered in this round, and 14 winners of the first qualifying round.
- Third qualifying round (12 teams): 12 winners of the second qualifying round.
- Play-off round (10 teams): 4 teams which entered in this round, and 6 winners of the third qualifying round.

The default access list could be altered based on the qualifying teams' 2026 UEFA club coefficients should the winners of the 2025–26 UEFA Champions League also have qualified for the 2026–27 edition via their domestic league.

All teams eliminated from the Champions Path entered either the Europa League or the Conference League:

- The losers of the first qualifying round entered the Conference League Champions Path second qualifying round unless drawn to receive a bye to the Conference League Champions Path third qualifying round.
- The 12 losers of the second qualifying round entered the Europa League Champions Path third qualifying round
- The 6 losers of the third qualifying round entered the Europa League play-off round.
- The 5 losers of the play-off round entered the Europa League league phase.

Below were the participating teams of the Champions Path (with their 2026 UEFA club coefficients), grouped by their starting rounds.

Key to colours
Winners of play-off round advanced to league phase
Losers of play-off round entered Europa League league phase
Losers of third qualifying round entered Europa League play-off round
Losers of second qualifying round entered Europa League third qualifying round
Losers of the first qualifying round that received a bye entered Conference League third qualifying round
Losers of the first qualifying round entered Conference League second qualifying round

Play-off round
Team	Coeff.
(Scotland) Celtic	44.000
(Greece) AEK Athens	24.000
(Austria) LASK	21.000
(Norway) Viking	8.247

Second qualifying round
Team	Coeff.
(Serbia) Red Star Belgrade	46.500
(Croatia) Dinamo Zagreb	46.500
(Slovakia) Slovan Bratislava	36.000
(Poland) Lech Poznań	27.250
(Slovenia) Celje	23.000
(Cyprus) Omonia	21.250
(Israel) Hapoel Be'er Sheva	14.000
(Denmark) AGF	8.421
(Switzerland) Thun	6.940
(Sweden) Mjällby AIF	5.925

First qualifying round
Team	Coeff.
(Republic of Ireland) Shamrock Rovers	19.375
(Finland) KuPS	14.000
(Kosovo) Drita	13.625
(Gibraltar) Lincoln Red Imps	13.500
(Bosnia and Herzegovina) Borac Banja Luka	13.125
(Iceland) Víkingur Reykjavík	11.750
(Kazakhstan) Kairat	11.000
(Romania) Universitatea Craiova	10.500
(Latvia) Riga	10.500
(Faroe Islands) KÍ	10.500
(Estonia) Flora	10.000
(Northern Ireland) Larne	9.000
(Moldova) Petrocub Hîncești	9.000
(Wales) The New Saints	9.000
(Andorra) Inter Club d'Escaldes	7.500
(Bulgaria) Levski Sofia	7.000
Ararat-Armenia	7.000
(Azerbaijan) Sabah	6.000
(Lithuania) Kauno Žalgiris	6.000
(Montenegro) Sutjeska	6.000
(Hungary) ETO Győr	5.437
(Georgia (country)) Iberia 1999	5.000
(Albania) Egnatia	4.500
(Malta) Floriana	4.000
(San Marino) Tre Fiori	2.500
(North Macedonia) Vardar	1.551
(Belarus) ML Vitebsk	1.325
(Luxembourg) Atert Bissen	1.325

=== League Path ===
The League Path included all league non-champions which did not qualify directly for the league phase, and consisted of the following rounds:

- Second qualifying round (4 teams): 4 teams which entered in this round.
- Third qualifying round (8 teams): 6 teams which entered in this round, and 2 winners of the second qualifying round.
- Play-off round (4 teams): 4 winners of the third qualifying round.

The default access list could be altered based on the qualifying teams' 2026 UEFA club coefficients should the winners of the 2025–26 UEFA Europa League also have qualified for the 2025–26 edition via their domestic league.

All teams eliminated from the League Path entered the Europa League:

- The 2 losers of the second qualifying round entered the Main Path third qualifying round.
- The 4 losers of the third qualifying round entered the league phase.
- The 2 losers of the play-off round entered the league phase.

Below were the participating teams of the League Path (with their 2026 UEFA club coefficients), grouped by their starting rounds.

Key to colours
Winners of play-off round advanced to league phase
Losers of play-off round entered Europa League league phase
Losers of third qualifying round entered Europa League league phase
Losers of second qualifying round entered Europa League third qualifying round

Third qualifying round
Team	Coeff.
(France) Lyon	65.750
(Norway) Bodø/Glimt	64.000
(Greece) Olympiacos	62.250
(Belgium) Union Saint-Gilloise	48.000
(Czech Republic) Sparta Prague	38.250
(Netherlands) NEC	13.585

Second qualifying round
Team	Coeff.
(Turkey) Fenerbahçe	57.750
(Austria) Sturm Graz	28.000
(Scotland) Heart of Midlothian	11.500
(Poland) Górnik Zabrze	9.350

== First qualifying round ==
The draw for the first qualifying round was held on 16 June 2026.

=== Seeding ===
A total of 28 teams played in the first qualifying round. Seeding of the teams was based on their 2026 UEFA club coefficients. Before the draw, UEFA divided the teams into two groups of seven seeded and seven unseeded teams per the principles set by the Club Competitions Committee. The first team drawn in each tie was designated as the home team for the first leg.

Champions Path
Group 1		Group 2	
Seeded	Unseeded	Seeded	Unseeded
(Republic of Ireland) Shamrock Rovers; (Finland) KuPS; (Gibraltar) Lincoln Red Imps; (Latvia) Riga; (Estonia) Flora; (Northern Ireland) Larne; (Wales) The New Saints	(Andorra) Inter Club d'Escaldes; Ararat-Armenia; (Azerbaijan) Sabah; (Georgia (country)) Iberia 1999; (Malta) Floriana; (San Marino) Tre Fiori; (North Macedonia) Vardar	(Kosovo) Drita; (Bosnia and Herzegovina) Borac Banja Luka; (Iceland) Víkingur Reykjavík; (Kazakhstan) Kairat; (Romania) Universitatea Craiova; (Faroe Islands) KÍ; (Moldova) Petrocub Hîncești	(Bulgaria) Levski Sofia; (Lithuania) Kauno Žalgiris; (Montenegro) Sutjeska; (Hungary) ETO Győr; (Albania) Egnatia; (Belarus) ML Vitebsk; (Luxembourg) Atert Bissen

=== Summary ===
The first legs were played on 7 and 8 July, and the second legs were played on 14 and 15 July 2026.

The winners of the ties advanced to the Champions Path second qualifying round. Twelve of the losing teams were transferred to the Conference League Champions Path second qualifying round, while the losers of matches 4 and 5, selected following an additional draw for rebalancing purposes, were transferred to the Conference League Champions Path third qualifying round.

First qualifying round
Team 1	Agg.	Team 2	1st leg	2nd leg
Sabah (Azerbaijan)	4–1	(Wales) The New Saints	2–0	2–1
Floriana (Malta)	3–5	(Republic of Ireland) Shamrock Rovers	2–0	1–5
Flora (Estonia)	4–5	(Georgia (country)) Iberia 1999	2–3	2–2
Lincoln Red Imps (Gibraltar)	4–2	(Andorra) Inter Club d'Escaldes	3–1	1–1
Tre Fiori (San Marino)	1–3	(Northern Ireland) Larne	0–1	1–2
Ararat-Armenia	4–3	(Latvia) Riga	2–0	2–3
Vardar (North Macedonia)	3–4	(Finland) KuPS	0–2	3–2 (a.e.t.)
Kauno Žalgiris (Lithuania)	4–3	(Kosovo) Drita	1–1	3–2
ML Vitebsk (Belarus)	1–5	(Romania) Universitatea Craiova	1–4	0–1
Petrocub Hîncești (Moldova)	2–7	(Albania) Egnatia	1–1	1–6
Borac Banja Luka (Bosnia and Herzegovina)	1–5	(Bulgaria) Levski Sofia	1–1	0–4
Víkingur Reykjavík (Iceland)	3–2	(Hungary) ETO Győr	1–0	2–2
Kairat (Kazakhstan)	4–1	(Montenegro) Sutjeska	2–1	2–0
KÍ (Faroe Islands)	4–2	(Luxembourg) Atert Bissen	2–1	2–1

=== Matches ===
7 July 2026
18:00 (20:00 UTC+4)

Sabah (Azerbaijan)	2–0	(Wales) The New Saints
Simić 66'; Parris 84'	Report

Bank Respublika Arena, Masazir
Attendance: 7,000
Referee: Patryk Gryckiewicz (Poland)
14 July 2026
19:30 (18:30 UTC+1)

The New Saints (Wales)	1–2	(Azerbaijan) Sabah
Lock 89'	Report	Mickels 28'; Dashdamirov 42'

Park Hall, Oswestry
Attendance: 1,179
Referee: Mateo Busquets Ferrer (Spain)

Sabah won 4–1 on aggregate.

7 July 2026
19:30

Floriana (Malta)	2–0	(Republic of Ireland) Shamrock Rovers
Murić 45+1'; Jah 79'	Report

Centenary Stadium, Ta' Qali
Attendance: 1,215
Referee: Benjamin Brand (Germany)
14 July 2026
21:00 (20:00 UTC+1)

Shamrock Rovers (Republic of Ireland)	5–1	(Malta) Floriana
Grace 7'; McGovern 29', 48'; Burke 61'; Byrne 74'	Report	Gudelj 13'

Tallaght Stadium, Dublin
Attendance: 5,466
Referee: Joakim Östling (Sweden)

Shamrock Rovers won 5–3 on aggregate.

8 July 2026
18:00 (19:00 UTC+3)

Flora (Estonia)	2–3	(Georgia (country)) Iberia 1999
Kreida 28'; Alamaa 73'	Report	Natchkhebia 18'; Jinjolava 21' (pen.); Kardava 75'

Lilleküla Stadium, Tallinn
Attendance: 2,017
Referee: Sandi Putros (Denmark)
14 July 2026
18:00 (20:00 UTC+4)

Iberia 1999 (Georgia (country))	2–2	(Estonia) Flora
Sikharulashvili 13', 36'	Report	Varjund 69'; Sappinen 84' (pen.)

Mikheil Meskhi Stadium, Tbilisi
Attendance: 4,506
Referee: Florian Lata (Albania)

Iberia 1999 won 5–4 on aggregate.

7 July 2026
18:00

Lincoln Red Imps (Gibraltar)	3–1	(Andorra) Inter Club d'Escaldes
Nano 16' (pen.); Toledano 26'; Álvarez 67'	Report	Rutjens 45+2' (o.g.)

Europa Point Stadium, Gibraltar
Attendance: 721
Referee: João Gonçalves (Portugal)
14 July 2026
18:00

Inter Club d'Escaldes (Andorra)	1–1	(Gibraltar) Lincoln Red Imps
Dacu 80'	Report	Mula 62'

Estadi Nacional, Andorra la Vella
Attendance: 350
Referee: Sven Wolfensberger (Switzerland)

Lincoln Red Imps won 4–2 on aggregate.

7 July 2026
20:30

Tre Fiori (San Marino)	0–1	(Northern Ireland) Larne
	Report	Lusty 45'

San Marino Stadium, Serravalle
Attendance: 672
Referee: Artem Gasparyan (Armenia)
14 July 2026
21:00 (20:00 UTC+1)

Larne (Northern Ireland)	2–1	(San Marino) Tre Fiori
Ridley 25'; Bent 69' (pen.)	Report	Mengucci 12'

Inver Park, Larne
Attendance: 1,632
Referee: Sigurd Kringstad (Norway)

Larne won 3–1 on aggregate.

7 July 2026
18:00 (20:00 UTC+4)

Ararat-Armenia	2–0	(Latvia) Riga
Oliveira 63'; França 86'	Report

Abovyan City Stadium, Abovyan (Note: Ararat-Armenia played their first qualifying round home match at Abovyan City Stadium in Abovyan instead of at their regular home ground, Yerevan Football Academy Stadium.)
Attendance: 2,300
Referee: Klym Zabroda (Ukraine)
14 July 2026
19:00 (20:00 UTC+3)

Riga (Latvia)	3–2	Ararat-Armenia
Siqueira 14'; Ankrah 23'; Ramires 90+4' (pen.)	Report	Shaghoyan 46'; Lima 63'

Skonto Stadium, Riga
Attendance: 4,801
Referee: Bence Csonka (Hungary)

Ararat-Armenia won 4–3 on aggregate.

7 July 2026
19:00

Vardar (North Macedonia)	0–2	(Finland) KuPS
	Report	Magassa 45'; Armah 49'

Toše Proeski Arena, Skopje
Attendance: 3,512
Referee: Kadir Sağlam (Turkey)
14 July 2026
17:00 (18:00 UTC+3)

KuPS (Finland)	2–3 (a.e.t.)	(North Macedonia) Vardar
Armah 100'; Parzyszek 105+1' (pen.)	Report	Omeragikj 59'; Zakarić 90+1' (pen.); Puleio 102'

Kuopio Football Stadium, Kuopio
Attendance: 2,887
Referee: Matthew MacDermid (Scotland)

KuPS won 4–3 on aggregate.

7 July 2026
18:00 (19:00 UTC+3)

Kauno Žalgiris (Lithuania)	1–1	(Kosovo) Drita
Benchaib 24'	Report	Bl. Krasniqi 82'

Darius and Girėnas Stadium, Kaunas
Attendance: 4,484
Referee: Ívar Orri Kristjánsson (Iceland)
14 July 2026
20:00

Drita (Kosovo)	2–3	(Lithuania) Kauno Žalgiris
Jashari 20'; Manaj 53'	Report	Slivka 9', 82'; Benchaib 90+4' (pen.)

Fadil Vokrri Stadium, Pristina (Note: Drita played their home leg at Fadil Vokrri Stadium because their regular home ground, Gjilan City Stadium, did not meet UEFA requirements.)
Attendance: 2,130
Referee: Oğuzhan Çakır (Turkey)

Kauno Žalgiris won 4–3 on aggregate.

8 July 2026
19:00

ML Vitebsk (Belarus)	1–4	(Romania) Universitatea Craiova
Gromyko 20'	Report	Baiaram 4'; Al Hamlawi 24' (pen.), 43' (pen.); Nsimba 90+4'

Mezőkövesdi Városi Stadion, Mezőkövesd, Hungary (Note: Due to the country's involvement in the Russian invasion of Ukraine, Belarusian teams were required to play their home matches at neutral venues and behind closed doors until further notice.)
Attendance: 20
Referee: Luka Bilbija (Bosnia and Herzegovina)
15 July 2026
19:30 (20:30 UTC+3)

Universitatea Craiova (Romania)	1–0	(Belarus) ML Vitebsk
Bancu 90+1'	Report

Ion Oblemenco Stadium, Craiova
Attendance: 14,008
Referee: Márton Rúsz (Hungary)

Universitatea Craiova won 5–1 on aggregate.

8 July 2026
19:00 (20:00 UTC+3)

Petrocub Hîncești (Moldova)	1–1	(Albania) Egnatia
Popescu 1'	Report	Kryeziu 35'

Zimbru Stadium, Chișinău (Note: Petrocub Hîncești played their home leg at Zimbru Stadium because their regular home ground, Hîncești Municipal Stadium, did not meet UEFA requirements.)
Attendance: 8,798
Referee: Sayat Karabayev (Kazakhstan)
15 July 2026
21:00

Egnatia (Albania)	6–1	(Moldova) Petrocub Hîncești
Bitri 2'; Albanese 31'; M. Plătică 44' (o.g.); Yago 59'; Bakayoko 84'; Gruda 90'	Report	Rotaru 64'

Egnatia Arena, Rrogozhinë
Attendance: 3,250
Referee: Philip Farrugia (Malta)

Egnatia won 7–2 on aggregate.

7 July 2026
20:30

Borac Banja Luka (Bosnia and Herzegovina)	1–1	(Bulgaria) Levski Sofia
Juričić 9' (pen.)	Report	Oko-Flex 55'

Banja Luka City Stadium, Banja Luka
Attendance: 10,102
Referee: Mehmet Türkmen (Turkey)
14 July 2026
19:30 (20:30 UTC+3)

Levski Sofia (Bulgaria)	4–0	(Bosnia and Herzegovina) Borac Banja Luka
Oko-Flex 48'; Reinaldo 59', 65'; Perea 85'	Report

Stadion Georgi Asparuhov, Sofia
Attendance: 17,325
Referee: Andrew Madley (England)

Levski Sofia won 5–1 on aggregate.

7 July 2026
21:00 (19:00 UTC)

Víkingur Reykjavík (Iceland)	1–0	(Hungary) ETO Győr
Hansen 90+2'	Report

Víkingsvöllur, Reykjavík
Attendance: 1,108
Referee: Romain Lissorgue (France)
14 July 2026
19:00

ETO Győr (Hungary)	2–2	(Iceland) Víkingur Reykjavík
Vitális 38' (pen.); S. Þorkelsson 45+1' (o.g.)	Report	Hafsteinsson 34'; Sigurðsson 55'

ETO Park, Győr
Attendance: 6,138
Referee: Mateo Erceg (Croatia)

Víkingur Reykjavík won 3–2 on aggregate.

8 July 2026
17:00 (20:00 UTC+5)

Kairat (Kazakhstan)	2–1	(Montenegro) Sutjeska
Lucas Áfrico 76'; Gual 90+3'	Report	Mrvaljević 90'

Central Stadium, Almaty
Attendance: 14,356
Referee: Dmytro Panchyshyn (Ukraine)
15 July 2026
21:00

Sutjeska (Montenegro)	0–2	(Kazakhstan) Kairat
	Report	Bekbolat 68'; Jorginho 82' (pen.)

Stadion kraj Bistrice, Nikšić
Attendance: 2,246
Referee: Wojciech Myć (Poland)

Kairat won 4–1 on aggregate.

7 July 2026
20:45 (19:45 UTC+1)

KÍ (Faroe Islands)	2–1	(Luxembourg) Atert Bissen
Ali 13'; Klettskarð 50'	Report	Rodrigues da Costa 57'

Við Djúpumýrar, Klaksvík
Attendance: 1,095
Referee: Dominik Starý (Czech Republic)
15 July 2026
20:15

Atert Bissen (Luxembourg)	1–2	(Faroe Islands) KÍ
Ferber 25'	Report	Frederiksberg 9'; Klettskarð 59'

Stade de Luxembourg, Luxembourg City (Note: Atert Bissen played their home leg at Stade de Luxembourg because their regular home ground, Terrain ZAC Klengbousbierg, did not meet UEFA requirements.)
Attendance: 2,072
Referee: Igor Stojčevski (North Macedonia)

KÍ won 4–2 on aggregate.

== Second qualifying round ==
The draw for the second qualifying round was held on 17 June 2026.

=== Seeding ===
A total of 28 teams played in the second qualifying round. Seeding of the teams was based on their 2026 UEFA club coefficients. For the winners of the first qualifying round, whose identity was not known at the time of the draw, the club coefficient of the highest-ranked remaining team in each tie was used. Before the draw, UEFA divided the teams and/or pairings into groups in accordance with the principles set by the Club Competitions Committee. In the Champions Path, the 24 teams and/or pairings were divided into two groups of twelve, each containing six seeded and six unseeded entries. In the League Path, the four teams were divided into one group containing two seeded and two unseeded teams. The team or pairing represented by the ball drawn first was designated as the home team for the first leg.

Champions Path
Group 1		Group 2	
Seeded	Unseeded	Seeded	Unseeded
(Serbia) Red Star Belgrade; (Poland) Lech Poznań; (Republic of Ireland) Shamrock Rovers; (Finland) KuPS; (Lithuania) Kauno Žalgiris; (Gibraltar) Lincoln Red Imps	Ararat-Armenia; (Faroe Islands) KÍ; (Northern Ireland) Larne; (Azerbaijan) Sabah; (Denmark) AGF; (Sweden) Mjällby AIF	(Croatia) Dinamo Zagreb; (Slovakia) Slovan Bratislava; (Slovenia) Celje; (Cyprus) Omonia; (Israel) Hapoel Be'er Sheva; (Bulgaria) Levski Sofia	(Iceland) Víkingur Reykjavík; (Kazakhstan) Kairat; (Romania) Universitatea Craiova; (Georgia (country)) Iberia 1999; (Albania) Egnatia; (Switzerland) Thun

League Path
Seeded	Unseeded
(Turkey) Fenerbahçe; (Austria) Sturm Graz	(Scotland) Heart of Midlothian; (Poland) Górnik Zabrze

Notes

1. ^{†} Winners of the first qualifying round, whose identity was not known at the time of draw. Teams in italics defeated a team with a higher coefficient, thus effectively taking the coefficient of their opponent in the draw.

=== Summary ===
The first legs were played on 21 and 22 July, and the second legs were played on 28 and 29 July 2026.

The winners of the ties advanced to the third qualifying round. The losers were transferred to the Europa League third qualifying round.

Second qualifying round
Team 1	Agg.	Team 2	1st leg	2nd leg
Champions Path
Mjällby AIF (Sweden)	3–0	(Gibraltar) Lincoln Red Imps	3–0	0–0
Larne (Northern Ireland)	0–9	(Serbia) Red Star Belgrade	0–4	0–5
Sabah (Azerbaijan)	3–0	(Finland) KuPS	1–0	2–0
KÍ (Faroe Islands)	0–1	(Lithuania) Kauno Žalgiris	0–0	0–1
AGF (Denmark)	5–5 (4–3 p)	(Poland) Lech Poznań	1–4	4–1 (a.e.t.)
Ararat-Armenia	3–2	(Republic of Ireland) Shamrock Rovers	2–0	1–2
Levski Sofia (Bulgaria)	3–2	(Romania) Universitatea Craiova	1–0	2–2
Omonia (Cyprus)	1–1 (5–6 p)	(Kazakhstan) Kairat	1–0	0–1 (a.e.t.)
Thun (Switzerland)	3–4	(Croatia) Dinamo Zagreb	1–1	2–3 (a.e.t.)
Víkingur Reykjavík (Iceland)	2–3	(Israel) Hapoel Be'er Sheva	2–1	0–2
Iberia 1999 (Georgia (country))	1–3	(Slovakia) Slovan Bratislava	0–2	1–1
Egnatia (Albania)	5–5 (1–4 p)	(Slovenia) Celje	3–3	2–2 (a.e.t.)
League Path
Fenerbahçe (Turkey)	2–1	(Poland) Górnik Zabrze	1–0	1–1
Sturm Graz (Austria)	6–0	(Scotland) Heart of Midlothian	4–0	2–0

=== Champions Path matches ===
21 July 2026
18:00

Mjällby AIF (Sweden)	3–0	(Gibraltar) Lincoln Red Imps
Samuelsen 18', 24'; Bergström 32'	Report

Strandvallen, Hällevik
Attendance: 3,523
Referee: Matthew De Gabriele (Malta)
28 July 2026
18:00

Lincoln Red Imps (Gibraltar)	0–0	(Sweden) Mjällby AIF
	Report

Europa Point Stadium, Gibraltar
Attendance: 774
Referee: Alexandros Tsakalidis (Greece)

Mjällby AIF won 3–0 on aggregate.

21 July 2026
21:00 (20:00 UTC+1)

Larne (Northern Ireland)	0–4	(Serbia) Red Star Belgrade
	Report	Bruno Duarte 26' (pen.), 67'; Kostov 55'; Cham 85'

Inver Park, Larne
Attendance: 2,462
Referee: Rareș Vidican (Romania)
29 July 2026
20:00

Red Star Belgrade (Serbia)	5–0	(Northern Ireland) Larne
Katai 3'; Arnautović 45+4', 60'; Loizou 49'; Bukari 79'	Report

Red Star Stadium, Belgrade
Attendance: 26,114
Referee: Elchin Masiyev (Azerbaijan)

Red Star Belgrade won 9–0 on aggregate.

21 July 2026
18:00 (20:00 UTC+4)

Sabah (Azerbaijan)	1–0	(Finland) KuPS
Simić 45+1'	Report

Bank Respublika Arena, Masazir
Attendance: 7,100
Referee: Łukasz Kuźma (Poland)
28 July 2026
17:00 (18:00 UTC+3)

KuPS (Finland)	0–2	(Azerbaijan) Sabah
	Report	Simić 52'; Mickels 70'

Kuopio Football Stadium, Kuopio
Attendance: 2,980
Referee: Gal Leibovitz (Israel)

Sabah won 3–0 on aggregate.

21 July 2026
20:45 (19:45 UTC+1)

KÍ (Faroe Islands)	0–0	(Lithuania) Kauno Žalgiris
	Report

Við Djúpumýrar, Klaksvík
Attendance: 1,091
Referee: Bastien Dechepy (France)
29 July 2026
18:00 (19:00 UTC+3)

Kauno Žalgiris (Lithuania)	1–0	(Faroe Islands) KÍ
Kreković 85'	Report

Central Stadium, Jonava (Note: The match was moved from Kauno Žalgiris' home ground, Darius and Girėnas Stadium, Kaunas to Jonava Stadium, Jonava due to scheduling conflict with a concert by American rapper Pitbull.)
Attendance: 2,275
Referee: David Šmajc (Slovenia)

Kauno Žalgiris won 1–0 on aggregate.

21 July 2026
19:00

AGF (Denmark)	1–4	(Poland) Lech Poznań
Arnstad 55'	Report	Ishak 29'; Wålemark 42', 65'; Yegbe 61'

Randers Stadium, Randers (Note: AGF played their home legs at the Cepheus Park in Randers, instead of their regular home ground, Ceres Park in Aarhus, which was undergoing major renovation.)
Attendance: 8,943
Referee: Oliver Reitala (Finland)
29 July 2026
19:00

Lech Poznań (Poland)	1–4 (a.e.t.)	(Denmark) AGF
Jagiełło 95'	Report	Bech 32'; Arnstad 55' (pen.); Tingager 75'; Kristjánsson 100'
Penalties
Jagiełło (penalty scored); Sayyadmanesh (penalty missed); Kozubal (penalty missed); Agnero (penalty scored); Pereira (penalty scored)	3–4	(penalty missed) Arnstad; (penalty scored) Tingager; (penalty scored) Kristjánsson; (penalty scored) Serra; (penalty scored) Bech

Poznań Stadium, Poznań
Attendance: 36,215
Referee: Juxhin Xhaja (Albania)

5–5 on aggregate; AGF won 4–3 on penalties.

21 July 2026
18:00 (20:00 UTC+4)

Ararat-Armenia	2–0	(Republic of Ireland) Shamrock Rovers
Lima 51'; Banjaqui 80'	Report

Vazgen Sargsyan Republican Stadium, Yerevan (Note: For the second and third qualifying rounds, Ararat-Armenia played their home legs at the Vazgen Sargsyan Republican Stadium in Yerevan, instead of their regular home ground, Yerevan Football Academy Stadium in Yerevan.)
Attendance: 3,900
Referee: David Dickinson (Scotland)
28 July 2026
21:00 (20:00 UTC+1)

Shamrock Rovers (Republic of Ireland)	2–1	Ararat-Armenia
Healy 11'; Greene 36'	Report	Lima 73'

Tallaght Stadium, Dublin
Attendance: 6,731
Referee: Sam Barrott (England)

Ararat-Armenia won 3–2 on aggregate.

22 July 2026
19:30 (20:30 UTC+3)

Levski Sofia (Bulgaria)	1–0	(Romania) Universitatea Craiova
Dimitrov 8'	Report

Stadion Georgi Asparuhov, Sofia
Attendance: 16,118
Referee: Adam Ladebäck (Sweden)
29 July 2026
19:30 (20:30 UTC+3)

Universitatea Craiova (Romania)	2–2	(Bulgaria) Levski Sofia
Bancu 45+2'; Rus 48'	Report	Everton 13'; Aldair 16'

Ion Oblemenco Stadium, Craiova
Attendance: 27,037
Referee: Matteo Marcenaro (Italy)

Levski Sofia won 3–2 on aggregate.

22 July 2026
19:00 (20:00 UTC+3)

Omonia (Cyprus)	1–0	(Kazakhstan) Kairat
Andreou 13'	Report

GSP Stadium, Nicosia
Attendance: 14,106
Referee: Gustavo Correia (Portugal)
29 July 2026
17:00 (20:00 UTC+5)

Kairat (Kazakhstan)	1–0 (a.e.t.)	(Cyprus) Omonia
Edmilson 37'	Report
Penalties
Edmilson (penalty scored); Oksanen (penalty scored); Martynovich (penalty scored); Baybek (penalty missed); Gual (penalty scored); Tuyakbayev (penalty scored); Birkurmanov (penalty scored)	6–5	(penalty scored) Chatzigiovanis; (penalty missed) Balkovec; (penalty scored) Andreou; (penalty scored) Neofytou; (penalty scored) Kousoulos; (penalty scored) Christou; (penalty missed) Panagiotou

Central Stadium, Almaty
Attendance: 19,135
Referee: Rohit Saggi (Norway)

1–1 on aggregate; Kairat won 6–5 on penalties.

21 July 2026
20:00

Thun (Switzerland)	1–1	(Croatia) Dinamo Zagreb
Labeau 20'	Report	Zajc 86'

Stockhorn Arena, Thun
Attendance: 9,000
Referee: Bulat Sariyev (Kazakhstan)
28 July 2026
20:00

Dinamo Zagreb (Croatia)	3–2 (a.e.t.)	(Switzerland) Thun
Beljo 74'; Kačavenda 78'; Valinčić 112'	Report	Labeau 4'; Bürki 22'

Stadion Maksimir, Zagreb
Attendance: 17,092
Referee: Radoslav Gidzhenov (Bulgaria)

Dinamo Zagreb won 4–3 on aggregate.

21 July 2026
21:00 (19:00 UTC)

Víkingur Reykjavík (Iceland)	2–1	(Israel) Hapoel Be'er Sheva
Hansen 48', 86'	Report	Kangwa 51'

Víkingsvöllur, Reykjavík
Attendance: 1,108
Referee: Filip Glova (Slovakia)
29 July 2026
19:30

Hapoel Be'er Sheva (Israel)	2–0	(Iceland) Víkingur Reykjavík
Ahmed 65'; Ganah 80'	Report

Haladás Sportkomplexum, Szombathely, Hungary (Note: Due to the Gaza war, Israeli teams were required to play their home matches at neutral venues until further notice.)
Attendance: 397
Referee: Antoni Bandić (Bosnia and Herzegovina)

Hapoel Be'er Sheva won 3–2 on aggregate.

21 July 2026
18:00 (20:00 UTC+4)

Iberia 1999 (Georgia (country))	0–2	(Slovakia) Slovan Bratislava
	Report	Šporar 25'; Yirajang 31'

Mikheil Meskhi Stadium, Tbilisi
Attendance: 7,119
Referee: Lukas Fähndrich (Switzerland)
29 July 2026
20:15

Slovan Bratislava (Slovakia)	1–1	(Georgia (country)) Iberia 1999
Kukharevych 44'	Report	Sikharulashvili 51'

Tehelné pole, Bratislava
Attendance: 17,867
Referee: Christian-Petru Ciochirca (Austria)

Slovan Bratislava won 3–1 on aggregate.

22 July 2026
21:00

Egnatia (Albania)	3–3	(Slovenia) Celje
Daniel 7' (o.g.); Medeiros 58'; Diabaté 78'	Report	Kvesić 45', 66'; Kučys 54'

Egnatia Arena, Rrogozhinë
Attendance: 4,000
Referee: Atilla Karaoğlan (Turkey)
28 July 2026
20:15

Celje (Slovenia)	2–2 (a.e.t.)	(Albania) Egnatia
Kvesić 34', 97' (pen.)	Report	Hrka 21' (o.g.); Smajli 114'
Penalties
Sešlar (penalty scored); Tutyškinas (penalty scored); Dukuly (penalty scored); Ćalušić (penalty scored)	4–1	(penalty missed) Bitri; (penalty scored) Xhemajli; (penalty missed) Ndreca

Stadion Z'dežele, Celje
Attendance: 3,470
Referee: Joey Kooij (Netherlands)

5–5 on aggregate; Celje won 4–1 on penalties.

=== League Path matches ===
21 July 2026
20:00 (21:00 UTC+3)

Fenerbahçe (Turkey)	1–0	(Poland) Górnik Zabrze
Talisca 37'	Report

Şükrü Saracoğlu Stadium, Istanbul
Attendance: 38,604
Referee: Manfredas Lukjančukas (Lithuania)
29 July 2026
20:00

Górnik Zabrze (Poland)	1–1	(Turkey) Fenerbahçe
Sáček 45+10'	Report	Talisca 12' (pen.)

Arena Zabrze, Zabrze
Attendance: 28,499
Referee: Lothar D'hondt (Belgium)

Fenerbahçe won 2–1 on aggregate.

21 July 2026
20:30

Sturm Graz (Austria)	4–0	(Scotland) Heart of Midlothian
Gorenc Stanković 4'; Mitchell 50'; Weinhandl 53'; Heil 59'	Report

Liebenauer Stadium, Graz
Attendance: 15,822
Referee: Gergő Bogár (Hungary)
28 July 2026
20:45 (19:45 UTC+1)

Heart of Midlothian (Scotland)	0–2	(Austria) Sturm Graz
	Report	Siedl 64'; Soglo 68'

Tynecastle Park, Edinburgh
Attendance: 17,861
Referee: Andris Treimanis (Latvia)

Sturm Graz won 6–0 on aggregate.

== Third qualifying round ==
The draw for the third qualifying round was held on 20 July 2026.

=== Seeding ===
A total of 20 teams played in the third qualifying round. Seeding of the teams was based on their 2026 UEFA club coefficients. The teams were divided into seeded and unseeded pots. The first team drawn in each tie was designated as the home team for the first leg.

Champions Path
Seeded	Unseeded
(Serbia) Red Star Belgrade; (Croatia) Dinamo Zagreb; (Slovakia) Slovan Bratislava; (Denmark) AGF; (Slovenia) Celje; (Kazakhstan) Kairat	Ararat-Armenia; (Azerbaijan) Sabah; (Israel) Hapoel Be'er Sheva; (Sweden) Mjällby AIF; (Bulgaria) Levski Sofia; (Lithuania) Kauno Žalgiris

League Path
Seeded	Unseeded
(France) Lyon; (Norway) Bodø/Glimt; (Greece) Olympiacos; (Turkey) Fenerbahçe	(Belgium) Union Saint-Gilloise; (Czech Republic) Sparta Prague; (Austria) Sturm Graz; (Netherlands) NEC

Notes

1. ^{†} Winners of the second qualifying round, whose identity was not known at the time of draw. Teams in italics defeated a team with a higher coefficient, thus effectively taking the coefficient of their opponent in the draw.

=== Summary ===
The first legs were played on 4 and 5 August, and the second legs were played on 11 August 2026.

The winners of the ties advanced to the play-off round. The losers of the Champions Path were transferred to the Europa League play-off round, and the losers of the League Path were transferred to the Europa League league phase.

Third qualifying round
Team 1	Agg.	Team 2	1st leg	2nd leg
Champions Path
Dinamo Zagreb (Croatia)	7–1	(Lithuania) Kauno Žalgiris	5–0	2–1
Mjällby AIF (Sweden)	1–4	(Slovakia) Slovan Bratislava	1–2	0–2
Levski Sofia (Bulgaria)	2–0	(Kazakhstan) Kairat	1–0	1–0
AGF (Denmark)	2–5	(Azerbaijan) Sabah	2–1	0–4
Ararat-Armenia	2–3	(Slovenia) Celje	2–1	0–2
Hapoel Be'er Sheva (Israel)	3–0	(Serbia) Red Star Belgrade	1–0	2–0
League Path
Olympiacos (Greece)	1–2	(Netherlands) NEC	0–0	1–2 (a.e.t.)
Union Saint-Gilloise (Belgium)	5–6	(Norway) Bodø/Glimt	3–3	2–3 (a.e.t.)
Fenerbahçe (Turkey)	3–0	(Austria) Sturm Graz	2–0	1–0
Sparta Prague (Czech Republic)	2–4	(France) Lyon	2–1	0–3

=== Champions Path matches ===
4 August 2026
20:00

Dinamo Zagreb (Croatia)	5–0	(Lithuania) Kauno Žalgiris
Zajc 31'; McKenna 33'; Lisica 51'; Stojković 76'; Kačavenda 90+4'	Report

Stadion Maksimir, Zagreb
Attendance: 12,147
Referee: Erik Lambrechts (Belgium)
11 August 2026
19:00 (20:00 UTC+3)

Kauno Žalgiris (Lithuania)	1–2	(Croatia) Dinamo Zagreb
Debeljuh 56'	Report	Kačavenda 19'; Mišić 30'

Darius and Girėnas Stadium, Kaunas
Attendance: 6,051
Referee: Davide Massa (Italy)

Dinamo Zagreb won 7–1 on aggregate.

4 August 2026
18:00

Mjällby AIF (Sweden)	1–2	(Slovakia) Slovan Bratislava
Stroud 61' (pen.)	Report	Camara 78'; Kianga 90+4'

Strandvallen, Hällevik
Attendance: 3,327
Referee: Nick Walsh (Scotland)
11 August 2026
20:15

Slovan Bratislava (Slovakia)	2–0	(Sweden) Mjällby AIF
Camara 47'; Yirajang 78'	Report

Tehelné pole, Bratislava
Attendance: 21,350
Referee: Michael Oliver (England)

Slovan Bratislava won 4–1 on aggregate.

4 August 2026
19:30 (20:30 UTC+3)

Levski Sofia (Bulgaria)	1–0	(Kazakhstan) Kairat
Serginho 90+2'	Report

Stadion Georgi Asparuhov, Sofia
Attendance: 16,916
Referee: Donatas Rumšas (Lithuania)
11 August 2026
17:00 (20:00 UTC+5)

Kairat (Kazakhstan)	0–1	(Bulgaria) Levski Sofia
	Report	Reinaldo 13'

Turkistan Arena, Turkistan (Note: Kairat played their third qualifying round home leg at the Turkistan Arena in Turkistan, instead of their regular home ground, Central Stadium in Almaty due to a scheduling conflict with a concert by American rapper Kanye West.)
Attendance: 7,000
Referee: Daniel Siebert (Germany)

Levski Sofia won 2–0 on aggregate.

5 August 2026
18:30

AGF (Denmark)	2–1	(Azerbaijan) Sabah
Bogere 32', 63'	Report	Simić 67'

Randers Stadium, Randers
Attendance: 8,970
Referee: Rade Obrenovič (Slovenia)
11 August 2026
18:00 (20:00 UTC+4)

Sabah (Azerbaijan)	4–0	(Denmark) AGF
Simić 59'; Solvet 67'; Mickels 78'; Severina 89'	Report

Bank Respublika Arena, Masazir
Attendance: 8,900
Referee: Willy Delajod (France)

Sabah won 5–2 on aggregate.

4 August 2026
18:00 (20:00 UTC+4)

Ararat-Armenia	2–1	(Slovenia) Celje
Serobyan 38'; França 70'	Report	Sešlar 22' (pen.)

Vazgen Sargsyan Republican Stadium, Yerevan
Attendance: 8,110
Referee: Ivan Kružliak (Slovakia)
11 August 2026
20:15

Celje (Slovenia)	2–0	Ararat-Armenia
Dukuly 83'; Verbič 85'	Report

Stadion Z'dežele, Celje
Attendance: 5,060
Referee: Marco Guida (Italy)

Celje won 3–2 on aggregate.

4 August 2026
19:30

Hapoel Be'er Sheva (Israel)	1–0	(Serbia) Red Star Belgrade
Ahmed 38'	Report

Haladás Sportkomplexum, Szombathely, Hungary
Attendance: 882
Referee: Jesús Gil Manzano (Spain)
11 August 2026
20:00

Red Star Belgrade (Serbia)	0–2	(Israel) Hapoel Be'er Sheva
	Report	Zlatanović 61'; East 79'

Red Star Stadium, Belgrade
Attendance: 40,833
Referee: Glenn Nyberg (Sweden)

Hapoel Be'er Sheva won 3–0 on aggregate.

=== League Path matches ===
4 August 2026
20:00 (21:00 UTC+3)

Olympiacos (Greece)	0–0	(Netherlands) NEC
	Report

Karaiskakis Stadium, Piraeus
Attendance: 31,134
Referee: José María Sánchez Martínez (Spain)
11 August 2026
19:30

NEC (Netherlands)	2–1 (a.e.t.)	(Greece) Olympiacos
Linssen 70'; Mor 95'	Report	El Kaabi 46'

Goffertstadion, Nijmegen
Attendance: 11,700
Referee: Maurizio Mariani (Italy)

NEC won 2–1 on aggregate.

4 August 2026
20:00

Union Saint-Gilloise (Belgium)	3–3	(Norway) Bodø/Glimt
Florucz 25', 45+4'; David 88'	Report	Berg 20'; Blomberg 29' (pen.); Bjørtuft 90+1'

Batimont Solar Park, Ostend (Note: Union Saint-Gilloise played their home match at Batimont Solar Park, Ostend, instead of their regular stadium, Joseph Marien Stadium, Brussels, which did not meet UEFA requirements.)
Attendance: 4,827
Referee: Irfan Peljto (Bosnia and Herzegovina)
11 August 2026
18:00

Bodø/Glimt (Norway)	3–2 (a.e.t.)	(Belgium) Union Saint-Gilloise
Blomberg 51'; Hauge 76'; Helmersen 117'	Report	Guilherme Smith 62'; Fuseini 88'

Aspmyra Stadion, Bodø
Attendance: 7,777
Referee: István Kovács (Romania)

Bodø/Glimt won 6–5 on aggregate.

5 August 2026
20:00 (21:00 UTC+3)

Fenerbahçe (Turkey)	2–0	(Austria) Sturm Graz
Talisca 9'; Greenwood 45'	Report

Şükrü Saracoğlu Stadium, Istanbul
Attendance: 39,800
Referee: Chris Kavanagh (England)
11 August 2026
20:30

Sturm Graz (Austria)	0–1	(Turkey) Fenerbahçe
	Report	Talisca 66' (pen.)

Liebenauer Stadium, Graz
Attendance: 15,599
Referee: Alejandro Hernández Hernández (Spain)

Fenerbahçe won 3–0 on aggregate.

4 August 2026
20:00

Sparta Prague (Czech Republic)	2–1	(France) Lyon
Ryneš 63'; Mercado 69'	Report	Suchomel 45' (o.g.)

Stadion Letná, Prague
Attendance: 17,515
Referee: Serdar Gözübüyük (Netherlands)
11 August 2026
21:00

Lyon (France)	3–0	(Czech Republic) Sparta Prague
Nuamah 20'; Maitland-Niles 66'; Morton 72'	Report

Parc Olympique Lyonnais, Décines-Charpieu
Attendance: 51,494
Referee: Szymon Marciniak (Poland)

Lyon won 4–2 on aggregate.

== Play-off round ==
The draw for the play-off round was held on 3 August 2026.

=== Seeding ===
A total of 14 teams played in the play-off round. Seeding of the teams was based on their 2026 UEFA club coefficients. The teams were divided into seeded and unseeded pots. The first team drawn in each tie was designated as the home team for the first leg of the tie.

Champions Path
Seeded	Unseeded
(Israel) Hapoel Be'er Sheva; (Croatia) Dinamo Zagreb; (Scotland) Celtic; (Slovakia) Slovan Bratislava; (Greece) AEK Athens	(Slovenia) Celje; (Austria) LASK; (Bulgaria) Levski Sofia; (Azerbaijan) Sabah; (Norway) Viking

League Path
Seeded	Unseeded
(France) Lyon; (Norway) Bodø/Glimt	(Netherlands) NEC; (Turkey) Fenerbahçe

Notes

1. ^{†} Winners of the third qualifying round, whose identity was not known at the time of draw. Teams in italics defeated a team with a higher coefficient, thus effectively taking the coefficient of their opponent in the draw.

=== Summary ===
The first legs were played on 18 and 19 August, and the second legs were played on 25 and 26 August 2026.

The winners of the ties advanced to the league phase. The losers were transferred to the Europa League league phase.

Play-off round
Team 1	Agg.	Team 2	1st leg	2nd leg
Champions Path
Levski Sofia (Bulgaria)	0–4	(Greece) AEK Athens	0–0	0–4
Celtic (Scotland)	4–5	(Austria) LASK	3–0	1–5 (a.e.t.)
Dinamo Zagreb (Croatia)	3–5	(Norway) Viking	2–2	1–3
Slovan Bratislava (Slovakia)	3–2	(Slovenia) Celje	1–1	2–1 (a.e.t.)
Hapoel Be'er Sheva (Israel)	4–6	(Azerbaijan) Sabah	2–1	2–5 (a.e.t.)
League Path
Fenerbahçe (Turkey)	3–2	(France) Lyon	1–1	2–1
NEC (Netherlands)	1–6	(Norway) Bodø/Glimt	1–3	0–3

=== Champions Path matches ===
18 August 2026
21:00 (22:00 UTC+3)

Levski Sofia (Bulgaria)	0–0	(Greece) AEK Athens
	Report

Vasil Levski National Stadium, Sofia (Note: Levski Sofia played their play-off round home leg at the Vasil Levski National Stadium in Sofia, instead of their regular home ground, Stadion Georgi Asparuhov in Sofia, which did not meet UEFA requirements for this stage.)
Attendance: 38,976
Referee: Glenn Nyberg (Sweden)
26 August 2026
21:00 (22:00 UTC+3)

AEK Athens (Greece)	4–0	(Bulgaria) Levski Sofia
Jović 7'; Varga 12', 29'; Marin 55' (pen.)	Report

Agia Sophia Stadium, Athens
Attendance: 30,500
Referee: Clément Turpin (France)

AEK Athens won 4–0 on aggregate.

19 August 2026
21:00 (20:00 UTC+1)

Celtic (Scotland)	3–0	(Austria) LASK
Nygren 26'; Durán 38', 67'	Report

Celtic Park, Glasgow
Attendance: 55,882
Referee: Sandro Schärer (Switzerland)
25 August 2026
21:00

LASK (Austria)	5–1 (a.e.t.)	(Scotland) Celtic
Usor 32'; Ljubičić 48'; Adeniran 58', 109'; Flecker 90'	Report	McGregor 21'

Raiffeisen Arena, Linz
Attendance: 16,252
Referee: Szymon Marciniak (Poland)

LASK won 5–4 on aggregate.

18 August 2026
21:00

Dinamo Zagreb (Croatia)	2–2	(Norway) Viking
Beljo 6'; Lisica 10'	Report	Christiansen 26'; Tripić 39'

Stadion Maksimir, Zagreb
Attendance: 17,342
Referee: Serdar Gözübüyük (Netherlands)
26 August 2026
21:00

Viking (Norway)	3–1	(Croatia) Dinamo Zagreb
Tripić 18' (pen.); Austbø 48'; Moi 50'	Report	Hoxha 10'

Viking Stadion, Stavanger
Attendance: 15,152
Referee: José María Sánchez Martínez (Spain)

Viking won 5–3 on aggregate.

19 August 2026
21:00

Slovan Bratislava (Slovakia)	1–1	(Slovenia) Celje
Čerepkai 15'	Report	Avdyli 41'

Tehelné pole, Bratislava
Attendance: 21,640
Referee: Felix Zwayer (Germany)
26 August 2026
21:00

Celje (Slovenia)	1–2 (a.e.t.)	(Slovakia) Slovan Bratislava
Sešlar 34' (pen.)	Report	Šporar 18'; Martínez 100'

Stadion Z'dežele, Celje
Attendance: 11,500
Referee: Alejandro Hernández Hernández (Spain)

Slovan Bratislava won 3–2 on aggregate.

19 August 2026
21:00 (22:00 UTC+3)

Hapoel Be'er Sheva (Israel)	2–1	(Azerbaijan) Sabah
East 43'; Zlatanović 79'	Report	Simić 6'

Rapid-Giulești Stadium, Bucharest, Romania
Attendance: 1,048
Referee: Davide Massa (Italy)
25 August 2026
18:45 (20:45 UTC+4)

Sabah (Azerbaijan)	5–2 (a.e.t.)	(Israel) Hapoel Be'er Sheva
Nwachukwu 38'; Rakhmonaliev 74'; Mutallimov 90+4'; Mbina 101'; Mickels 115'	Report	Zlatanović 10'; Mizrahi 61'

Tofiq Bahramov Republican Stadium, Baku (Note: Sabah played their play-off round home leg at the Tofiq Bahramov Republican Stadium in Baku, instead of their regular home ground, Bank Respublika Arena in Masazir, which did not meet UEFA requirements for this stage.)
Attendance: 27,890
Referee: István Kovács (Romania)

Sabah won 6–4 on aggregate.

=== League Path matches ===
18 August 2026
21:00 (22:00 UTC+3)

Fenerbahçe (Turkey)	1–1	(France) Lyon
Greenwood 47'	Report	Openda 40'

Şükrü Saracoğlu Stadium, Istanbul
Attendance: 41,655
Referee: Sven Jablonski (Germany)
26 August 2026
21:00

Lyon (France)	1–2	(Turkey) Fenerbahçe
Fofana 61'	Report	Muriqi 24'; Brown 28'

Parc Olympique Lyonnais, Décines-Charpieu
Attendance: 55,443
Referee: Maurizio Mariani (Italy)

Fenerbahçe won 3–2 on aggregate.

19 August 2026
21:00

NEC (Netherlands)	1–3	(Norway) Bodø/Glimt
Bischoff 85'	Report	Brunstad Fet 25'; Helmersen 44' (pen.); Aleesami 50'

Goffertstadion, Nijmegen
Attendance: 11,700
Referee: François Letexier (France)
25 August 2026
21:00

Bodø/Glimt (Norway)	3–0	(Netherlands) NEC
Bjørkan 45+2'; Auklend 45+6'; Fonville 73' (o.g.)	Report

Aspmyra Stadion, Bodø
Attendance: 8,009
Referee: Michael Oliver (England)

Bodø/Glimt won 6–1 on aggregate.
