= Olavi Rissanen =

Finnish footballer (born 1947)

Personal information
- Date of birth: 26 March 1947 (age 79)
- Place of birth: Kuopio, Finland
- Height: 1.77 m (5 ft 10 in)
- Position: Forward

Senior career*
Years	Team	Apps	(Gls)
- Elo Kuopio
1970–1981	KuPS		
1982–1987	Koparit Kuopio		

International career
1969–1979	Finland	39	(5)
- * Club domestic league appearances and goals

Olavi Rissanen (born 26 March 1947) is a Finnish former footballer who played as a forward. He made 39 appearances for the Finland national team from 1969 to 1979.
