= Miikka Turunen =

Finnish football player (born 1979)

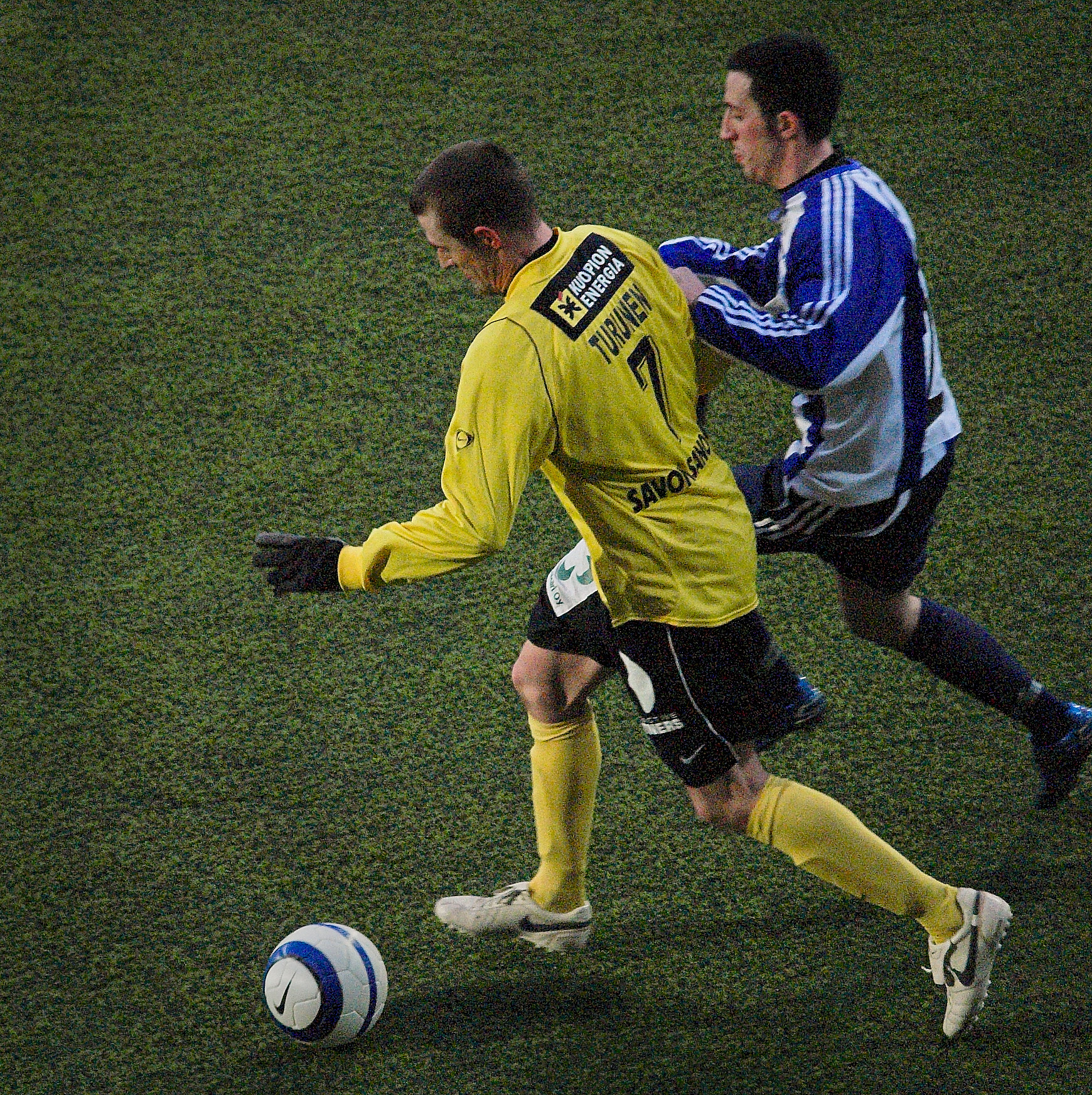

Personal information
- Date of birth: 18 August 1979 (age 47)
- Place of birth: Varkaus, Finland
- Height: 1.82 m (5 ft 11 1/2 in)
- Position: Midfielder

Senior career*
Years	Team	Apps	(Gls)
1997–2000	KuPS		
- TP-Seinäjoki
- Warkaus JK
- MP
2005–	KuPS	77	(7)
- * Club domestic league appearances and goals as of 21 July 2010

Miikka Turunen (born 18 August 1979) is a Finnish football player currently playing for KuPS.
