= Miika Nuutinen =

Finnish football manager (born 1991)

Personal information
- Full name: Miika Nuutinen
- Date of birth: 10 September 1991 (age 35)
- Place of birth: Tuusula, Finland

Team information
- Current team: KuPS (head coach)

Youth career
- –2009: TuPS

Senior career*
Years	Team	Apps	(Gls)
2008–2009	TuPS		

Managerial career
- 2022–2023: Klubi 04
- 2024: TPS
- 2025: HJK (assistant/interim)
- 2026–: KuPS
- * Club domestic league appearances and goals as of 20 January 2026

Miika Nuutinen (born 10 September 1991) is a Finnish football manager and former player, who is currently the head coach of Veikkausliiga club KuPS.

== Playing career ==
Nuutinen began his football journey in the youth system of Tuusulan Palloseura (TuPS). As a teenager, he appeared for the club's senior team in the fourth-tier Kolmonen, but his playing career remained brief as he pivoted toward coaching at the unusually young age of 17. His early transition to the sidelines was driven by a strong interest in game analysis and leadership, leading him to prioritize coaching education over a professional playing career.His early transition was motivated by a self-described interest in tactical analysis and leadership over professional playing ambitions.

== Coaching career ==
Nuutinen has a UEFA Pro -coaching license. He has also graduated in a bachelor's degree programme of Sports Coaching and Management in the Haaga-Helia University of Applied Sciences. Since June 2022, Nuutinen works also as a football pundit for Yle Sport.

Nuutinen started football coaching in his former youth club Tuusulan Palloseura as a youth coach, additionally working with another local club PK Keski-Uusimaa youth sector. In 2017, Nuutinen started as a youth talent coach in Vantaan Jalkapalloseura, and in late 2019 he joined Käpylän Pallo U17-team.

=== Klubi 04 ===
On 30 November 2021, it was announced that Nuutinen was named the head coach of Klubi 04, the reserve team of HJK Helsinki. At the end of the 2023 season, he led the team to gain a spot in new Ykkönen.

Nuutinen also coached HJK U19 youth squad in 2023–24 UEFA Youth League, where the team advanced by defeating Malmö FF, before eventually losing to Nantes on penalties, after drawing them 1–1 on aggregate.

=== TPS ===
In September 2023, Nuutinen was named the manager of Turun Palloseura in the new Finnish second-tier Ykkösliiga, on a three-year deal starting in 2024 season. Nuutinen left TPS after one season due to club's financial problems.

=== HJK Helsinki ===
On 8 January 2025, Nuutinen was named an assistant coach of HJK Helsinki. Following the departure of the head coach Toni Korkeakunnas in May 2025, he took over as interim manager. He successfully led HJK to win the 2025 Finnish Cup, defeating KuPS 1–0 in the final.

=== KuPS ===
On 19 December 2025, it was announced that Nuutinen would leave HJK to become the head coach of the defending champions, KuPS, for the 2026 season. He signed a two-year contract with an option for an additional year, replacing Jarkko Wiss.

== Managerial statistics ==
As of 26 February 2026

Team	Nat	From	To	Record							
Team	Nat	From	To	P	W	D	L	GF	GA	GD	W%
Klubi 04	(Finland)	1 January 2022	31 December 2023	54	27	12	15	120	76	+44	50.00
TPS	(Finland)	1 January 2024	31 December 2024	36	17	9	10	62	45	+17	47.22
HJK Helsinki (interim)	(Finland)	5 May 2025	31 December 2025	36	19	7	10	87	56	+31	52.78
KuPS	(Finland)	1 January 2026	Present	36	17	9	10	56	42	+14	47.22
Total				132	64	28	40	275	189	+86	48.48

== Honours ==
HJK

- Finnish Cup: 2025
