= Taneli Hämäläinen =

Finnish footballer (born 2001)

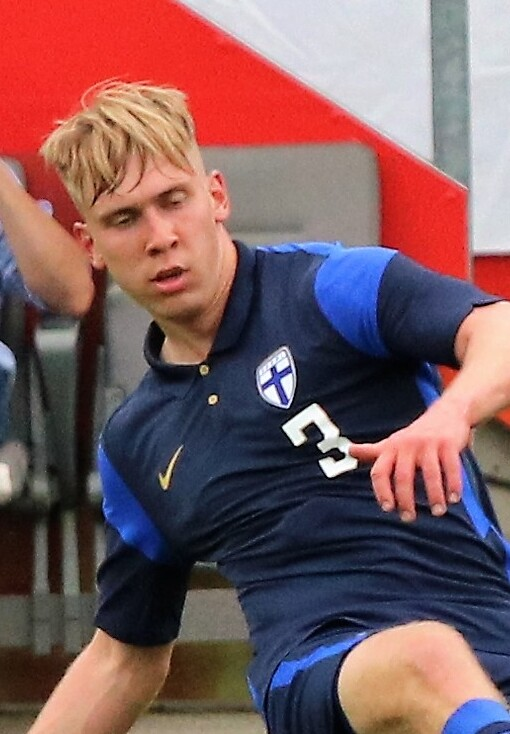
- Hämäläinen with Finland U21 in 2022

Personal information
- Full name: Taneli Armas Hämäläinen
- Date of birth: 16 April 2001 (age 25)
- Place of birth: Kuopio, Finland
- Height: 1.84 m (6 ft 0 in)
- Position: Defender

Team information
- Current team: KuPS
- Number: 33

Senior career*
Years	Team	Apps	(Gls)
2018–2020	KuFu-98	28	(1)
2020–2024	KuPS	76	(4)
2022–2023	→ KuPS II	2	(0)
2025–2026	ADO Den Haag	11	(0)
2025–2026	→ KuPS (loan)	26	(0)
2026–	KuPS	15	(0)

International career^{‡}
2018	Finland U17	3	(0)
2021–2022	Finland U21	12	(0)
- * Club domestic league appearances and goals as of 12 November 2026 ‡ National team caps and goals as of 10 June 2022

Taneli Armas Hämäläinen (born 16 April 2001) is a Finnish professional football player who plays as a defender for KuPS.

== Career ==
Hämäläinen is a product of Kuopion Palloseura (KuPS) youth academy, and made his debut with the first team in Veikkausliiga in the 2020 season. With KuPS, Hämäläinen has won one Finnish championship title in 2024, three Finnish Cups, and finished as the league's runner-up on three occasions.

On 14 December 2024, it was announced that Hämäläinen would join Eerste Divisie club ADO Den Haag in January 2025.

== Career statistics ==
As of 27 June 2026

Appearances and goals by club, season and competition
Club	Season	League			Cup (Note: Includes Suomen Cup)		League cup		Europe		Total	
Club	Season	Division	Apps	Goals	Apps	Goals	Apps	Goals	Apps	Goals	Apps	Goals
KuFu-98	2018	Kakkonen	2	0	–		–		–		2	0
KuFu-98	2019	Kakkonen	16	1	–		–		–		16	1
KuFu-98	2020	Kakkonen	10	0	–		–		–		10	0
KuFu-98	Total		28	1	0	0	0	0	0	0	28	1
KuPS	2020	Veikkausliiga	0	0	2	0	–		0	0	2	0
KuPS	2021	Veikkausliiga	23	2	6	0	–		7 (Note: Appearances in UEFA Conference League)	0	36	2
KuPS	2022	Veikkausliiga	16	0	4	0	3	0	5	0	28	0
KuPS	2023	Veikkausliiga	13	0	2	0	4	0	1	0	19	0
KuPS	2024	Veikkausliiga	24	2	5	0	3	0	3	0	35	2
KuPS	Total		76	4	19	0	10	0	16	0	121	4
KuPS Akatemia	2022	Kakkonen	1	0	–		–		–		1	0
KuPS Akatemia	2023	Kakkonen	1	0	–		–		–		1	0
KuPS Akatemia	Total		2	0	0	0	0	0	0	0	2	0
ADO Den Haag	2024–25	Eerste Divisie	11	0	0	0	–		–		11	0
KuPS (loan)	2025	Veikkausliiga	11	0	2	0	0	0	6 (Note: Two appearances in UEFA Europa League, four appearances in UEFA Conference League)	0	19	0
KuPS (loan)	2026	Veikkausliiga	15	0	3	0	2	0	2 (Note: Two appearances in UEFA Conference League)	0	22	0
KuPS (loan)	Total		26	0	5	0	2	0	8	0	41	0
Career total			143	5	24	0	12	0	24	0	203	5

== Honours ==
KuPS

- Veikkausliiga: 2024
- Veikkausliiga runner-up: 2021, 2022, 2023
- Finnish Cup: 2021, 2022, 2024
- Finnish League Cup runner-up: 2024
