= Mohamed Touré (footballer, born 2005) =

Guinean footballer (born 2005)

Personal information
- Date of birth: 3 November 2005 (age 21)
- Place of birth: Kindia, Guinea
- Height: 1.85 m (6 ft 1 in)
- Position: Forward

Team information
- Current team: Viktoria Plzeň
- Number: 10

Youth career
- ASM Sangarédi

Senior career*
Years	Team	Apps	(Gls)
2024	TPS	5	(0)
2025	KuPS	28	(13)
2026–	Viktoria Plzeň	11	(2)

International career^{‡}
2025–	Guinea	1	(0)
- * Club domestic league appearances and goals as of 27 May 2026 ‡ National team caps and goals as of 18 November 2025

Mohamed Touré (born 3 November 2005) is a Guinean professional footballer who plays as a forward for Czech First League club Viktoria Plzeň and the Guinea national team.

== Club career ==
In August 2024, Touré signed with Turun Palloseura in Finnish second-tier Ykkösliiga.

In January 2025, he joined Veikkausliiga club Kuopion Palloseura. On 22 July, Toureé scored the winning goal for KuPS in the first leg of the second round of the UEFA Champions League qualification against Kairat Almaty, helping his side to win the match 2–0. On 29 August, his contract was extended until the end of 2027. Touré represented KuPS in the 2025–26 UEFA Conference League league phase.

On 12 February 2026, Touré signed with Czech First League club Viktoria Plzeň on a three-and-a-half-year deal, for a €1.5 million transfer fee. He scored his first goal in Czech league on 15 March, in a 2–0 home win over Bohemians 1905.

== International career ==
Touré was included in the initial Guinea U-23 squad for the 2024 Summer Olympic football tournament but he was not included in the final squad.

He was called up to the senior Guinea squad for a pair of friendlies against Togo and Niger in November 2025. He made his Guinea debut during the 1–1 draw against Niger on 18 November 2025.

== Career statistics ==
=== Club ===
As of 19 May 2026

Appearances and goals by club, season and competition
Club	Season	Division	League		National cup (Note: Includes Finnish Cup and Czech Cup)		League cup		Europe		Total	
Club	Season	Division	Apps	Goals	Apps	Goals	Apps	Goals	Apps	Goals	Apps	Goals
TPS	2024	Ykkösliiga	5	0	—		—		—		5	0
KuPS	2025	Veikkausliiga	28	13	5	1	6	0	12 (Note: Four appearances and one goal in UEFA Champions League, three appearances and one goal in UEFA Europa League and five appearances in UEFA Conference League)	2	51	16
KuPS	2026	Veikkausliiga	0	0	0	0	1	2	0	0	1	2
KuPS	Total		28	13	5	1	7	2	12	2	52	18
Viktoria Plzeň	2025–26	Czech First League	10	2	1	0	—		0	0	11	2
Career total			43	15	6	1	7	2	12	2	68	20

=== International ===
As of match played 19 November 2025

Appearances and goals by national team and year
National team	Year	Apps	Goals
Guinea	2025	1	0
Total		1	0

== Honours ==
KuPS

- Veikkausliiga: 2025
- Finnish Cup runner-up: 2025
