= Samuel Pasanen =

Finnish footballer (born 2006)

Personal information
- Date of birth: 2 January 2006 (age 20)
- Place of birth: Bremen, Germany
- Height: 1.80 m (5 ft 11 in)
- Position: Midfielder

Team information
- Current team: KuPS
- Number: 14

Youth career
- Werder Bremen
- Kuusysi
- –2022: Lahti

Senior career*
Years	Team	Apps	(Gls)
2022–2024	Reipas Lahti	9	(1)
2022–2024	Lahti	43	(5)
2025–	KuPS	24	(1)

International career^{‡}
2021–2022	Finland U16	5	(1)
2022–2023	Finland U17	13	(3)
2023–	Finland U18	5	(1)
2024–	Finland U19	4	(0)
Medal record
Finland U18
First place	Baltic Cup	2023
- * Club domestic league appearances and goals as of 12 November 2026 ‡ National team caps and goals as of 16 October 2024

Samuel Pasanen (born 2 January 2006) is a Finnish professional footballer who plays as a midfielder for Veikkausliiga club KuPS.

== Club career ==
=== FC Lahti ===
Pasanen started football in the youth sectors of Werder Bremen and Kuusysi before joining FC Lahti organisation. Pasanen signed his first professional contract with FC Lahti on 27 January 2022, on a three-year deal ahead of the 2022 Veikkausliiga season. Pasanen made his Veikkausliiga debut on 24 July 2022, at the age of 16, in a 3–1 home defeat against SJK. He scored his first Veikkausliiga goals on 16 October 2022, a brace against HIFK in a 6–1 home victory.

After the 2024 season, Pasanen was named the Promising Young Player of the Year, by the Football Association of Finland. As his father was awarded the same prize in 1998, they became the first father and a son to win the award.

=== KuPS ===
On 6 November 2024, Pasanen signed with reigning Finnish champions Kuopion Palloseura (KuPS) on a multi-year deal. In January 2025, in the last minutes in the pre-season friendly match against MP, Pasanen suffered an ACL injury, and was ruled out for several months. KuPS won the match 9–0.

After recovering from the injury, Pasanen made his KuPS debut on 29 July 2025, in a UEFA Champions League qualification match against Kairat Almaty. On 17 August, he scored his first goal for KuPS, the winning goal in a 2–1 home win over the league leaders Inter Turku.

== International career ==
A regular Finnish youth international, Pasanen has represented Finland at under-16, under-17 and under-18 youth national team levels.

In September 2022, Pasanen was named the captain of Finland U17 squad for the 2023 UEFA European Under-17 Championship qualification tournament against Greece, Italy and Kosovo. Finland finished 2nd in the group and qualified to the elite round in March 2023.

Pasanen was part of the Finland U18 squad winning the friendly tournament Baltic Cup in June 2023.

== Personal life ==
Pasanen is the son of former Finland national team defender Petri Pasanen. He was born in Bremen, Germany, when his father was playing for Werder Bremen. He has also lived in Austria and Denmark as a child.

== Career statistics ==
As of 17 August 2025

Appearances and goals by club, season and competition
Club	Season	League			National cup (Note: Includes Finnish Cup)		League cup (Note: Includes Finnish League Cup)		Europe		Total	
Club	Season	Division	Apps	Goals	Apps	Goals	Apps	Goals	Apps	Goals	Apps	Goals
Reipas Lahti	2022	Kakkonen	4	1	—		—		—		4	1
Reipas Lahti	2023	Kakkonen	4	0	—		—		—		4	0
Reipas Lahti	2024	Kakkonen	1	0	—		—		—		1	0
Reipas Lahti	Total		9	1	0	0	0	0	0	0	9	1
Lahti	2022	Veikkausliiga	3	2	3	0	3	0	—		9	2
Lahti	2023	Veikkausliiga	16	0	3	0	5	0	—		24	0
Lahti	2024	Veikkausliiga	24	3	3	0	6	1	–		33	4
Lahti	Total		43	5	9	0	14	1	0	0	66	6
KuPS	2025	Veikkausliiga	3	1	0	0	0	0	2 (Note: Appearances in UEFA Champions League and UEFA Europa League)	0	5	1
Career total			55	7	9	0	14	1	2	0	80	8

== Honours ==
Finland U18

- Baltic Cup: 2023

Individual

- Football Association of Finland: Promising Young Player of the Year 2024
- Football Association of Finland: Boy Player of the Year 2022
