= Arttu Lötjönen =

Finnish footballer (born 2004)

Personal information
- Full name: Arttu Mikael Olavi Lötjönen
- Date of birth: 28 January 2004 (age 22)
- Place of birth: Pori, Finland
- Height: 1.84 m (6 ft 0 in)
- Position: Centre-back

Team information
- Current team: KuPS
- Number: 23

Youth career
- –2019: TOVE
- 2019–2022: Jazz
- 2023–2024: Sampdoria

Senior career*
Years	Team	Apps	(Gls)
2020–2022	Jazz	50	(1)
2023–2024	Sampdoria	0	(0)
2025–	KuPS	34	(0)

International career^{‡}
2021–2022	Finland U18	5	(0)
2022	Finland U19	5	(2)
2023–	Finland U21	7	(1)
- * Club domestic league appearances and goals as of 12 November 2026 ‡ National team caps and goals as of 31 March 2026

Arttu Mikael Olavi Lötjönen (born 28 January 2004) is a Finnish professional footballer who plays as a centre-back for Veikkausliiga club KuPS and the Finland national under-21 football team.

== Club career ==
=== FC Jazz ===
Born in Pori, Lötjönen started to play football in a youth team of local club Toejoen Veikot, before joining a rival club FC Jazz. He made his senior debut on 13 June 2020, at the age of 16, in third-tier Kakkonen for Jazz, in a match against KaaPo.

=== Sampdoria ===
In January 2023, Lötjönen joined the Italian club Sampdoria, and was first assigned to their U19 academy team playing in a youth league Primavera 1.

On 3 January 2024, after Lötjönen had spent one year in Italy, it was announced that Sampdoria and Lötjonen had signed "the first professional contract relating to the rights to the sporting performances of Lötjönen", valid until 30 June 2024.

=== KuPS ===
On 4 December 2024, Lötjönen returned to Finland and signed a two-year contract with reigning double champions Kuopion Palloseura (KuPS), with a deal including a one-year option. He made his debut for KuPS on 18 January 2025 in a Finnish League Cup match against Ilves.

== International career ==
Lötjönen has represented Finland at under-18 and under-19 youth international levels. He debuted with the Finland U21 national team in Baltic Cup in 2024.

== Career statistics ==
As of 22 July 2025

Appearances and goals by club, season and competition
Club	Season	League			Cup (Note: Includes Suomen Cup)		League cup (Note: Includes Finnish League Cup)		Europe		Other		Total	
Club	Season	Division	Apps	Goals	Apps	Goals	Apps	Goals	Apps	Goals	Apps	Goals	Apps	Goals
Toejoen Veikot	2019	Kolmonen	6	0	–		–		–		2 (Note: Includes UEFA Regions' Cup)	0	8	0
Jazz	2020	Kakkonen	12	0	1	0	–		–		–		13	0
Jazz	2021	Kakkonen	17	0	1	0	–		–		–		18	0
Jazz	2022	Kakkonen	21	1	1	0	–		–		–		22	1
Jazz	Total		50	1	3	0	0	0	0	0	0	0	53	1
Sampdoria	2022–23	Serie A	0	0	0	0	–		–		–		0	0
Sampdoria	2023–24	Serie B	0	0	0	0	–		–		–		0	0
Sampdoria	Total		0	0	0	0	0	0	0	0	0	0	0	0
KuPS	2025	Veikkausliiga	8	0	1	0	6	0	0	0	–		15	0
Career total			64	1	4	0	6	0	0	0	2	0	75	1
