= Ville Kumpu =

Finnish footballer (born 2008)

Personal information
- Date of birth: 18 February 2008 (age 18)
- Place of birth: Finland
- Height: 1.93 m (6 ft 4 in)
- Position: Centre back

Team information
- Current team: Ilves
- Number: 24

Youth career
- –2024: Ilves

Senior career*
Years	Team	Apps	(Gls)
2024–	Ilves II	21	(0)
2025–	Ilves	26	(0)

International career^{‡}
2022	Finland U15	7	(1)
2023–2024	Finland U16	7	(0)
2024–2025	Finland U17	12	(0)
2025–	Finland U19	6	(0)
- * Club domestic league appearances and goals as of 19 October 2026 ‡ National team caps and goals as of 19 October 2026

Ville Kumpu (born 18 February 2008) is a Finnish professional football player who plays as a centre back for Veikkausliiga side Ilves.
