= Kuopion Palloseura =

Finnish association football club

KuPS
- Full name: Kuopion Palloseura
- Nickname: Keltamusta (The Yellow-Black)
- Founded: 1923; 103 years ago
- Ground: Väre Areena; Kuopio
- Capacity: 5,000 (2,700 seated)
- Chairman: Vesa Kauppila
- Manager: Miika Nuutinen
- League: Veikkausliiga
- 2026: Veikkausliiga, 3rd of 12
- Website: www.kups.fi
Home colours	Away colours	Third colours

Kuopion Palloseura, commonly referred to as KuPS, is a Finnish professional football club based in Kuopio. KuPS competes in Veikkausliiga, the top flight of Finnish football. The team plays its home matches at Kuopio Football Stadium.

KuPS has won eight Finnish championship titles, the Finnish Cup five times and the Finnish League Cup once. The club is placed fourth in the all-time Finnish Premier League honour table.

== History ==
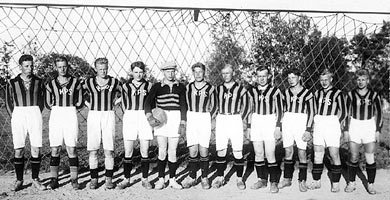
First team in 1923

The club was officially founded on 16 March 1923, at Kuopion Seurahuone. The club was named Kuopion Palloseura ("Kuopio Ball Club") with an abbreviation of KPS, which was later changed to KuPS.

The club spent the majority of the 1920s playing friendly games against other local clubs. In the 1930s and early 1940s, the club played in the second highest tier of Finnish football. KuPS was first promoted to Mestaruussarja in 1947, but were relegated at the end of their first season. The club was promoted again in 1949 and this time remained in the top tier for 44 consecutive seasons.

During the club’s early years, KuPS played in black and green shirts with vertical stripes, white shorts and black socks. In 1935, the colors were changed to a yellow shirt, black shorts and yellow and black socks. At the same time, the club's abbreviation changed from KPS to KuPS.

KuPS golden era took place between the 1950s and 1970s, when the club won five league titles, finished runner up on eight occasions, and third once. The club also won the Finnish Cup for the first time in 1968.

KuPS played in the top flight without significant success in the 1980s. However, the 1980s ended with the club's second Finnish Cup triumph in 1989.

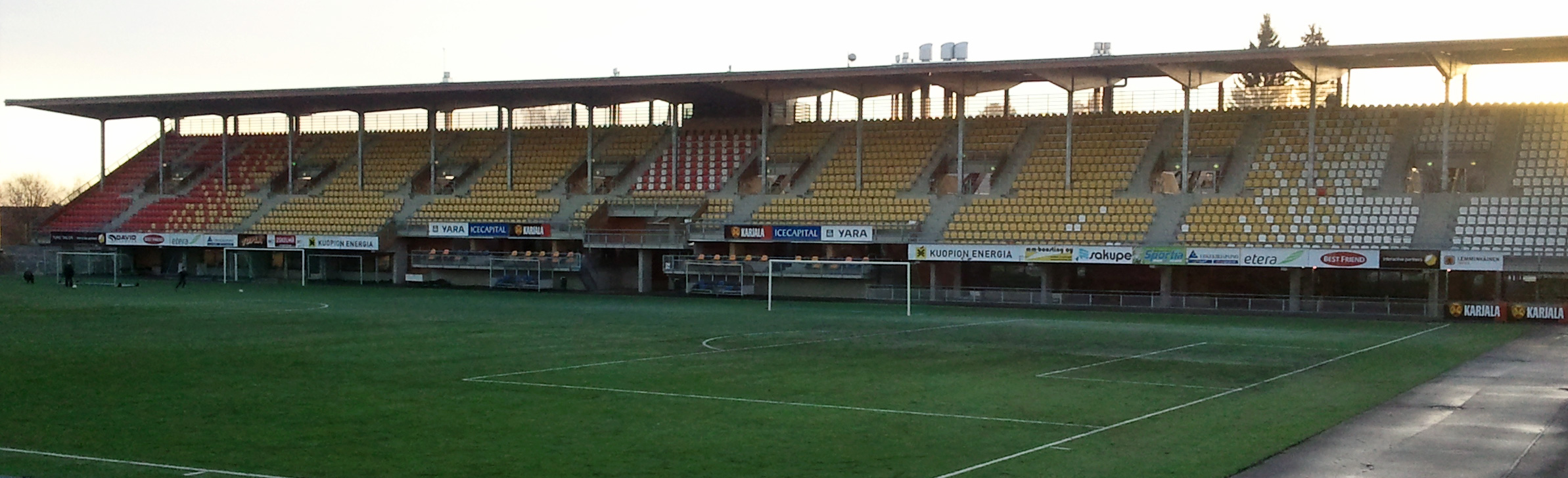
Kuopio Football Stadium in 2010.

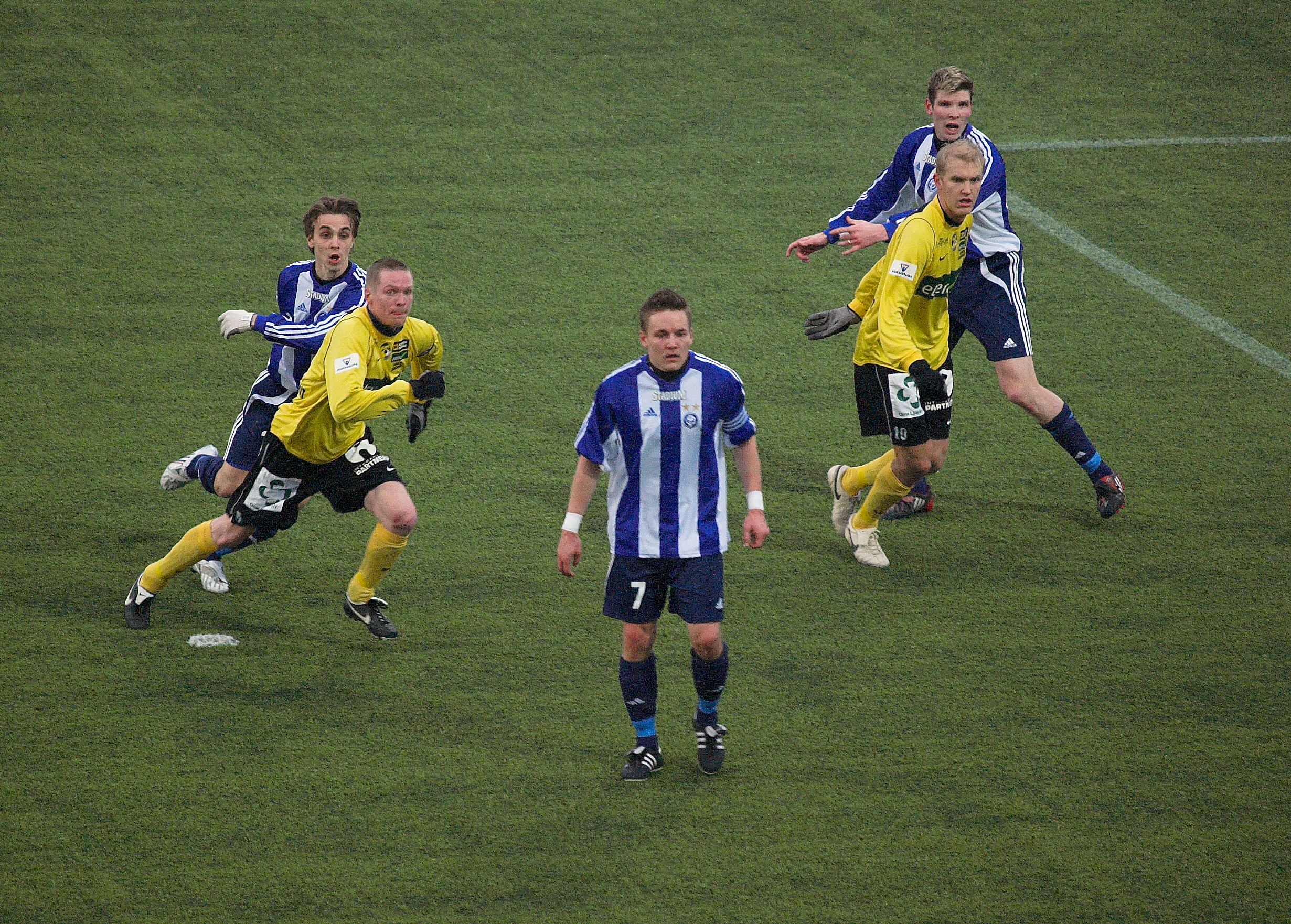
KuPS vs HJK at Magnum Areena, Kuopio. Finnish League Cup, 11 March 2008.

In the 1990s, KuPS had financial problems and even dropped to the third tier for the first time. In the early 2000s, KuPS spent seasons in both the First Division and in Veikkausliiga. The club have been in the top-flight since 2008.

The club hasn’t finished lower than 3rd in the league table since 2017. In the 2019 season KuPS won its sixth league title, coached by Jani Honkavaara. In 2021 and 2022 the club won the Finnish Cup for the third and fourth times. In the 2024 season, KuPS won its first-ever league and cup double, after winning the Finnish Championship and the Finnish Cup titles, led again by coach Honkavaara and captain Petteri Pennanen.

In the 2025 league season the club won its eight championship in the Finnish league and became runner-ups in the Finnish Cup. KuPS also reached the 2025–26 UEFA Conference League league phase, their first-ever spot in the European competition league phase. One win and four draws secured the club a place in the knockout phase play-offs. The club became the first Finnish club to advance from the league phase to play-off rounds.

== Season to season ==
Season to Season

Season	Level	Division	Section	Administration	Position	Movements
1930	Tier 2	B-sarja (First Division)		Finnish FA (Suomen Palloliitto)	Cup-format	Semi-finals
1931	Tier 2	B-sarja (First Division)		Finnish FA (Suomen Palloliitto)		Fell before group stage
1932	Tier 2	B-sarja (First Division)		Finnish FA (Suomen Palloliitto)	6th	
1933	Tier 2	B-sarja (First Division)		Finnish FA (Suomen Palloliitto)	6th	
1934	Tier 2	B-sarja (First Division)	East Group	Finnish FA (Suomen Palloliitto)	3rd	
1935	Tier 2	B-sarja (First Division)	East Group	Finnish FA (Suomen Palloliitto)	2nd	Promotion Group 4th
1936	Tier 2	Itä-Länsi-sarja (First Division)	East Group	Finnish FA (Suomen Palloliitto)	4th	
1937	Tier 2	Itä-Länsi-sarja (First Division)	East Group	Finnish FA (Suomen Palloliitto)	3rd	
1938	Tier 2	Itä-Länsi-sarja (First Division)	East Series, North Group	Finnish FA (Suomen Palloliitto)	3rd	
1939	Tier 2	Itä-Länsi-sarja (First Division)	East Series, North Group	Finnish FA (Suomen Palloliitto)	1st	
1940–41	Tier 2	B-sarja (First Division)		Finnish FA (Suomen Palloliitto)	3rd	
1943–44						Did not participate
1945	Tier 2	Suomensarja (First Division)	Group 2	Finnish FA (Suomen Palloliitto)	1st	
1945–46	Tier 2	Suomensarja (First Division)		Finnish FA (Suomen Palloliitto)	7th	
1946–47	Tier 2	Suomensarja (First Division)	North Group	Finnish FA (Suomen Palloliitto)	1st	Promotion Group 2nd, promoted
1947–48	Tier 1	Mestaruussarja (Premier League)		Finnish FA (Suomen Palloliitto)	7th	Relegated
1948	Tier 2	Suomensarja (First Division)	North Group	Finnish FA (Suomen Palloliitto)	1st	Promoted
1949	Tier 1	Mestaruussarja (Premier League)		Finnish FA (Suomen Palloliitto)	8th	
1950	Tier 1	Mestaruussarja (Premier League)		Finnish FA (Suomen Palloliitto)	2nd	
1951	Tier 1	Mestaruussarja (Premier League)		Finnish FA (Suomen Palloliitto)	5th	
1952	Tier 1	Mestaruussarja (Premier League)		Finnish FA (Suomen Palloliitto)	5th	
1953	Tier 1	Mestaruussarja (Premier League)		Finnish FA (Suomen Palloliitto)	3rd	
1954	Tier 1	Mestaruussarja (Premier League)		Finnish FA (Suomen Palloliitto)	2nd	
1955	Tier 1	Mestaruussarja (Premier League)		Finnish FA (Suomen Palloliitto)	4th	
1956	Tier 1	Mestaruussarja (Premier League)		Finnish FA (Suomen Palloliitto)	1st	Champions
1957	Tier 1	Mestaruussarja (Premier League)		Finnish FA (Suomen Palloliitto)	4th	
1958	Tier 1	Mestaruussarja (Premier League)		Finnish FA (Suomen Palloliitto)	1st	Champions
1959	Tier 1	Mestaruussarja (Premier League)		Finnish FA (Suomen Palloliitto)	4th	
1960	Tier 1	Mestaruussarja (Premier League)		Finnish FA (Suomen Palloliitto)	6th	
1961	Tier 1	Mestaruussarja (Premier League)		Finnish FA (Suomen Palloliitto)	9th	
1962	Tier 1	Mestaruussarja (Premier League)		Finnish FA (Suomen Palloliitto)	5th	
1963	Tier 1	Mestaruussarja (Premier League)		Finnish FA (Suomen Palloliitto)	6th	
1964	Tier 1	Mestaruussarja (Premier League)		Finnish FA (Suomen Palloliitto)	2nd	
1965	Tier 1	Mestaruussarja (Premier League)		Finnish FA (Suomen Palloliitto)	6th	
1966	Tier 1	Mestaruussarja (Premier League)		Finnish FA (Suomen Palloliitto)	1st	Champions
1967	Tier 1	Mestaruussarja (Premier League)		Finnish FA (Suomen Palloliitto)	2nd	
1968	Tier 1	Mestaruussarja (Premier League)		Finnish FA (Suomen Palloliitto)	4th	
1969	Tier 1	Mestaruussarja (Premier League)		Finnish FA (Suomen Palloliitto)	2nd	
1970	Tier 1	Mestaruussarja (Premier League)		Finnish FA (Suomen Palloliitto)	4th	
1971	Tier 1	Mestaruussarja (Premier League)		Finnish FA (Suomen Palloliitto)	7th	
1972	Tier 1	Mestaruussarja (Premier League)		Finnish FA (Suomen Palloliitto)	4th	
1973	Tier 1	Mestaruussarja (Premier League)		Finnish FA (Suomen Palloliitto)	4th	
1974	Tier 1	Mestaruussarja (Premier League)		Finnish FA (Suomen Palloliitto)	1st	Champions
1975	Tier 1	Mestaruussarja (Premier League)		Finnish FA (Suomen Palloliitto)	2nd	
1976	Tier 1	Mestaruussarja (Premier League)		Finnish FA (Suomen Palloliitto)	1st	Champions
1977	Tier 1	Mestaruussarja (Premier League)		Finnish FA (Suomen Palloliitto)	2nd	
1978	Tier 1	Mestaruussarja (Premier League)		Finnish FA (Suomen Palloliitto)	7th	
1979	Tier 1	Mestaruussarja (Premier League)		Finnish FA (Suomen Palloliitto)	2nd	
1980	Tier 1	Mestaruussarja (Premier League)		Finnish FA (Suomen Palloliitto)	8th	
1981	Tier 1	Mestaruussarja (Premier League)		Finnish FA (Suomen Palloliitto)	7th	
1982	Tier 1	Mestaruussarja (Premier League)		Finnish FA (Suomen Palloliitto)	8th	
1983	Tier 1	Mestaruussarja (Premier League)		Finnish FA (Suomen Palloliitto)	9th	Relegation Group 1st
1984	Tier 1	Mestaruussarja (Premier League)		Finnish FA (Suomen Palloliitto)	8th	
1985	Tier 1	Mestaruussarja (Premier League)		Finnish FA (Suomen Palloliitto)	6th	
1986	Tier 1	Mestaruussarja (Premier League)		Finnish FA (Suomen Palloliitto)	10th	
1987	Tier 1	Mestaruussarja (Premier League)		Finnish FA (Suomen Palloliitto)	8th	
1988	Tier 1	Mestaruussarja (Premier League)		Finnish FA (Suomen Palloliitto)	11th	Relegation Play-off
1989	Tier 1	Mestaruussarja (Premier League)		Finnish FA (Suomen Palloliitto)	7th	
1990	Tier 1	Futisliiga (Premier League)		Finnish FA (Suomen Palloliitto)	4th	Play-offs, final position 6th
1991	Tier 1	Futisliiga (Premier League)		Finnish FA (Suomen Palloliitto)	10th	
1992	Tier 1	Veikkausliiga (Premier League)		Finnish FA (Suomen Palloliitto)	12th	Relegated
1993	Tier 2	I divisioona (First Division)		Finnish FA (Suomen Palloliitto)	1st	Promotion Group 3rd, promoted
1994	Tier 1	Veikkausliiga (Premier League)		Finnish FA (Suomen Palloliitto)	14th	Relegated
1995	Tier 2	Ykkönen (First Division)		Finnish FA (Suomen Palloliitto)	12th	
1996	Tier 2	Ykkönen (First Division)	North Group	Finnish FA (Suomen Palloliitto)	7th	
1997	Tier 2	Ykkönen (First Division)	North Group	Finnish FA (Suomen Palloliitto)	7th	Lower Group North – 3rd – Playoffs – Relegated
1998	Tier 3	Kakkonen (Second Division)	North Group	Finnish FA (Suomen Palloliitto)	1st	Promoted
1999	Tier 2	Ykkönen (First Division)	South Group	Finnish FA (Suomen Palloliitto)	4th	Upper Group – 7th
2000	Tier 2	Ykkönen (First Division)	North Group	Finnish FA (Suomen Palloliitto)	1st	Upper Group – 1st – Promoted
2001	Tier 1	Veikkausliiga (Premier League)		Finnish FA (Suomen Palloliitto)	8th	
2002	Tier 1	Veikkausliiga (Premier League)		Finnish FA (Suomen Palloliitto)	9th	Promotion / Relegation Group – 1st
2003	Tier 1	Veikkausliiga (Premier League)		Finnish FA (Suomen Palloliitto)	14th	Relegated
2004	Tier 2	Ykkönen (First Division)		Finnish FA (Suomen Palloliitto)	1st	Promoted
2005	Tier 1	Veikkausliiga (Premier League)		Finnish FA (Suomen Palloliitto)	10th	
2006	Tier 1	Veikkausliiga (Premier League)		Finnish FA (Suomen Palloliitto)	13th	Relegated
2007	Tier 2	Ykkönen (First Division)		Finnish FA (Suomen Palloliitto)	1st	Promoted
2008	Tier 1	Veikkausliiga (Premier League)		Finnish FA (Suomen Palloliitto)	13th	Relegation Playoffs
2009	Tier 1	Veikkausliiga (Premier League)		Finnish FA (Suomen Palloliitto)	12th	
2010	Tier 1	Veikkausliiga (Premier League)		Finnish FA (Suomen Palloliitto)	2nd	
2011	Tier 1	Veikkausliiga (Premier League)		Finnish FA (Suomen Palloliitto)	6th	
2012	Tier 1	Veikkausliiga (Premier League)		Finnish FA (Suomen Palloliitto)	10th	
2013	Tier 1	Veikkausliiga (Premier League)		Finnish FA (Suomen Palloliitto)	7th	
2014	Tier 1	Veikkausliiga (Premier League)		Finnish FA (Suomen Palloliitto)	7th	
2015	Tier 1	Veikkausliiga (Premier League)		Finnish FA (Suomen Palloliitto)	9th	
2016	Tier 1	Veikkausliiga (Premier League)		Finnish FA (Suomen Palloliitto)	7th	
2017	Tier 1	Veikkausliiga (Premier League)		Finnish FA (Suomen Palloliitto)	2nd	
2018	Tier 1	Veikkausliiga (Premier League)		Finnish FA (Suomen Palloliitto)	3rd	
2019	Tier 1	Veikkausliiga (Premier League)		Finnish FA (Suomen Palloliitto)	1st	Champions
2020	Tier 1	Veikkausliiga (Premier League)		Finnish FA (Suomen Palloliitto)	3rd	
2021	Tier 1	Veikkausliiga (Premier League)		Finnish FA (Suomen Palloliitto)	2nd	
2022	Tier 1	Veikkausliiga (Premier League)		Finnish FA (Suomen Palloliitto)	2nd	
2023	Tier 1	Veikkausliiga (Premier League)		Finnish FA (Suomen Palloliitto)	2nd	
2024	Tier 1	Veikkausliiga (Premier League)		Finnish FA (Suomen Palloliitto)	1st	Champions
2025	Tier 1	Veikkausliiga (Premier League)		Finnish FA (Suomen Palloliitto)	1st	Champions

- 63 seasons in Veikkausliiga
- 23 seasons in Ykkönen
- 1 season in Kakkonen

== European campaigns ==
=== UEFA club competition record ===
As of 21 July 2026

Competition	Pld	W	D	L	GF	GA
UEFA Champions League	14	3	2	9	11	33
UEFA Cup Winners' Cup	4	0	2	2	2	7
UEFA Cup / UEFA Europa League	33	10	6	17	30	66
UEFA Conference League	30	8	13	9	47	38
Total	81	21	23	37	90	144

=== Competitions ===
Season	Competition	Round	Country	Club	Home	Away	Agg.	Y/N
1959–60	European Cup	PR	(West Germany)	Eintracht Frankfurt	KuPS withdrew			
1967–68	European Cup	1R	(France)	Saint-Étienne	0–2	0–3	0–5	
1969–70	UEFA Cup Winners' Cup	1R	(Portugal)	Académica de Coimbra	0–0	0–1	0–1	
1975–76	European Cup	1R	(Poland)	Ruch Chorzów	2–2	0–5	2–7	
1976–77	UEFA Cup	1R	(Sweden)	Östers	3–2	0–2	3–4	
1977–78	European Cup	1R	(Belgium)	Club Brugge	2–5	0–4	2–9	
1978–79	UEFA Cup	1R	(Denmark)	Boldklubben 1903	2–1	4–4	6–5	
1978–79	UEFA Cup	2R	(Denmark)	Esbjerg fB	0–2	1–4	1–6	
1980–81	UEFA Cup	1R	(France)	Saint-Étienne	0–7	0–7	0–14	
1990–91	UEFA Cup Winners' Cup	1R	(Soviet Union)	Dynamo Kyiv	2–2	0–4	2–6	
2011–12	UEFA Europa League	2QR	(Romania)	Gaz Metan Mediaș	1–0	0–2	1–2	
2012–13	UEFA Europa League	1QR	(Wales)	Llanelli	2–1	1–1	3–2	
2012–13	UEFA Europa League	2QR	(Israel)	Maccabi Netanya	0–1	2–1	2–2 (a)	
2012–13	UEFA Europa League	3QR	(Turkey)	Bursaspor	1–0	0–6	1–6	
2018–19	UEFA Europa League	1QR	(Denmark)	FC Copenhagen	0–1	1–1	1–2	
2019–20	UEFA Europa League	1QR	(Belarus)	Vitebsk	2–0	1–1	3–1	
2019–20	UEFA Europa League	2QR	(Poland)	Legia Warsaw	0–0	0–1	0–1	
2020–21	UEFA Champions League	1QR	(Norway)	Molde	—N/a	0–5	—N/a	
2020–21	UEFA Europa League	2QR	(Slovakia)	Slovan Bratislava	1–1 (4–3 p)	—N/a	—N/a	
2020–21	UEFA Europa League	3QR	(Lithuania)	Sūduva	2–0	—N/a	—N/a	
2020–21	UEFA Europa League	PO	(Romania)	CFR Cluj	—N/a	1–3	—N/a	
2021–22	UEFA Europa Conference League	1QR	(Armenia)	Noah	5–0	0–1	5–1	
2021–22	UEFA Europa Conference League	2QR	(Ukraine)	Vorskla Poltava	2–2	3–2 (a.e.t)	5–4	
2021–22	UEFA Europa Conference League	3QR	(Kazakhstan)	Astana	1–1	4–3	5–4	
2021–22	UEFA Europa Conference League	PO	(Germany)	Union Berlin	0–4	0–0	0–4	
2022–23	UEFA Europa Conference League	1QR	(Georgia (country))	Dila Gori	2–0	0–0	2–0	
2022–23	UEFA Europa Conference League	2QR	(Moldova)	Milsami Orhei	2–2	4–1	6–3	
2022–23	UEFA Europa Conference League	3QR	(Switzerland)	Young Boys	0–2	0–3	0–5	
2023–24	UEFA Europa Conference League	2QR	(Republic of Ireland)	Derry City	3–3	1–2	4–5	
2024–25	UEFA Conference League	1QR	(Luxembourg)	UNA Strassen	5–0	0–0	5–0	
2024–25	UEFA Conference League	2QR	(Norway)	Tromsø	0–1	0–1	0–2	
2025–26	UEFA Champions League	1QR	(Moldova)	Milsami Orhei	1–0	0−0	1–0	
2025–26	UEFA Champions League	2QR	(Kazakhstan)	Kairat	2–0	0–3	2–3	
2025–26	UEFA Europa League	3QR	(Latvia)	RFS	1–0	2–1	3–1	
2025–26	UEFA Europa League	PO	(Denmark)	Midtjylland	0–2	0–4	0–6	
2025–26	UEFA Conference League	League	(Kosovo)	Drita	1–1	—N/a	21st	
2025–26	UEFA Conference League	League	(Iceland)	Breiðablik	—N/a	0–0	21st	
2025–26	UEFA Conference League	League	(Slovakia)	Slovan Bratislava	3–1	—N/a	21st	
2025–26	UEFA Conference League	League	(Poland)	Jagiellonia Białystok	—N/a	0–1	21st	
2025–26	UEFA Conference League	League	(Switzerland)	Lausanne-Sport	0–0	—N/a	21st	
2025–26	UEFA Conference League	League	(England)	Crystal Palace	—N/a	2–2	21st	
2025–26	UEFA Conference League	KPPO	(Poland)	Lech Poznań	0–2	0–1	0–3	
2026–27	UEFA Champions League	1QR	(North Macedonia)	Vardar	2–3 (a.e.t)	2–0	4–3	
2026–27	UEFA Champions League	2QR	(Azerbaijan)	Sabah	0–2	0–1	0–3	
2026–27	UEFA Europa League	3QR	(Romania)	Universitatea Craiova	1–1	1–2	2–3	
2026–27	UEFA Conference League	PO	(Republic of Ireland)	Shamrock Rovers	1–0	1–1	2–1	
2026–27	UEFA Conference League	League	(Portugal)	Braga	—N/a			
2026–27	UEFA Conference League	League	(Belgium)	Gent		—N/a		
2026–27	UEFA Conference League	League	(Bosnia and Herzegovina)	Borac Banja Luka	—N/a			
2026–27	UEFA Conference League	League	(Turkey)	Trabzonspor		—N/a		
2026–27	UEFA Conference League	League	(Denmark)	Nordsjælland	—N/a			
2026–27	UEFA Conference League	League	(Bulgaria)	CSKA Sofia		—N/a		

==== UEFA coefficient ====
As of 19 December 2025

The following list ranks the current position of KuPS in UEFA club ranking:

Rank	Team	Points
108	(France) Strasbourg	15.000
109	(Cyprus) APOEL	14.750
110	(Finland) KuPS	14.000
111	(Finland) HJK	14.000
112	(Israel) Hapoel Be'er Sheva	14.000

== Transfers ==
In the last few decades, KuPS have produced numerous local players for Veikkausliiga and a few who have transferred abroad. Five among their seven biggest incoming transfer fees came from local mostly homegrown players. The club’s previous incoming transfer fee record was for then 17-year old Matias Siltanen, who departed for Djurgården following a great debut season for KuPS in 2024. It was surpassed one year later by the transfer of Otto Ruoppi to Mainz 05 for €1.3 million, and further surpassed by Mohamed Toure's transfer to FC Viktoria Plzeň for €1.5 million in February 2026.

=== Record transfers ===
Rank	Player	To	Fee	Year
1.	(Guinea) Mohamed Toure	(Czech Republic) Viktoria Plzeň	€1.5 million	2026
2.	(Finland) Otto Ruoppi	(Germany) Mainz 05	€1.3 million	2026
3.	(Finland) Matias Siltanen	(Sweden) Djurgården	€1.2 million	2025
4.	(Finland) Ilmari Niskanen	(Germany) FC Ingolsdtadt	€370,000	2020
5.	(Finland) Urho Nissilä	(Belgium) Zulte Waregem	€275,000	2018
6.	(Finland) Tony Miettinen	(Norway) Odd	€180,000	2024
7.	(Ghana) Nana Boateng	(Romania) CFR Cluj	€125,000	2021

== Current squad ==
As of 28 August 2026

Note: Flags indicate national team as defined under FIFA eligibility rules; some limited exceptions apply. Players may hold more than one non-FIFA nationality.

No.	Pos.	Nation	Player
1	GK	AUT	Johannes Kreidl
3	DF	FIN	Saku Heiskanen
4	DF	GHA	Kasim Nuhu
6	DF	FIN	Saku Savolainen
7	MF	FIN	Jerry Voutilainen
8	MF	FIN	Petteri Pennanen
9	FW	SWE	Gustav Engvall
10	MF	ARG	Valentín Gasc
11	FW	NCA	Jaime Moreno
12	GK	FIN	Hemmo Riihimäki
13	MF	FIN	Niilo Kujasalo
14	MF	FIN	Samuel Pasanen
15	MF	FRA	Ayman Aiki
16	MF	FIN	Tommi Jyry
17	MF	FIN	Arttu Heinonen
18	MF	FIN	Eemil Tanninen

No.	Pos.	Nation	Player
19	FW	UGA	Calvin Kabuye
20	FW	POL	Piotr Parzyszek
21	FW	FIN	Joslyn Luyeye-Lutumba
22	MF	GAM	Saikou Touray
23	DF	FIN	Arttu Lötjönen
24	DF	GHA	Bob Nii Armah
25	DF	GHA	Clinton Antwi
26	MF	FIN	Aaro Toivonen
28	DF	FRA	Brahima Magassa
29	DF	FIN	Akseli Puukko
30	DF	POR	Jorginho
32	DF	FIN	Rasmus Tikkanen
33	DF	FIN	Taneli Hämäläinen
34	MF	DEN	Julius Eskesen
37	GK	FIN	Kasperi Silen

=== Out on loan ===
Note: Flags indicate national team as defined under FIFA eligibility rules; some limited exceptions apply. Players may hold more than one non-FIFA nationality.

No.	Pos.	Nation	Player
2	DF	SWE	Karl Ward (at IFK Mariehamn until 31 December 2026)

== Management ==
As of 1 January 2026

Name	Role
(Finland) Miika Nuutinen	Head coach
(Finland) Jonas Nyholm	Assistant coach
(Finland) Mika Lähderinne	Conditioning coach
(Finland) Joonas Pöntinen	Goalkeeping coach
(Finland) Antti Nyman	Analyst
(Finland) Joonas Ojantie	Physiotherapist
(Finland) Sami Miettinen	Team manager

=== Boardroom ===
As of 1 January 2026

Name	Role
(Finland) Tomi Erola	CEO
(Finland) Vesa Kauppila	Chairman
(Finland) Sixten Boström	Sporting director

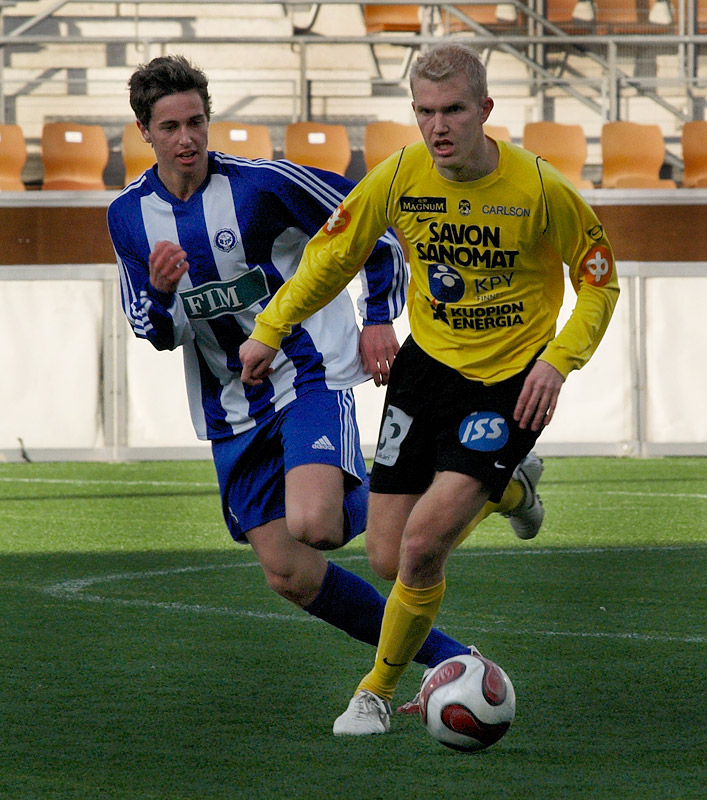
Ilja Venäläinen trailed by Klubi-04's Sakari Mattila (2007)

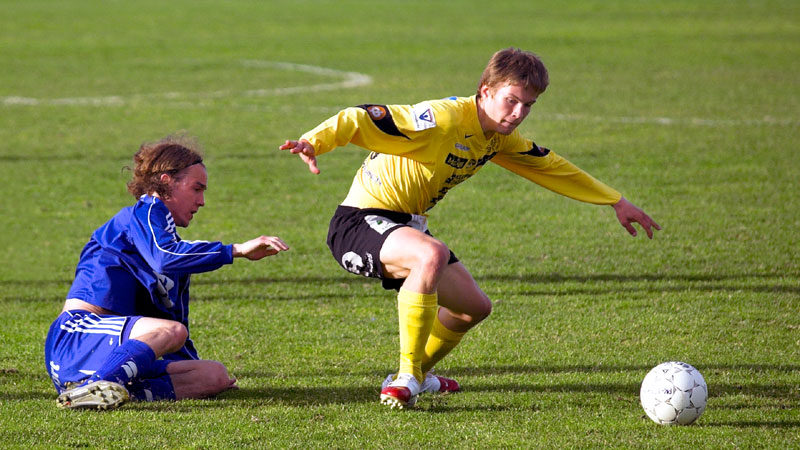
Jonni Heikkinen escapes from a PK-37 player in Finnish Cup 5th Round, 2006

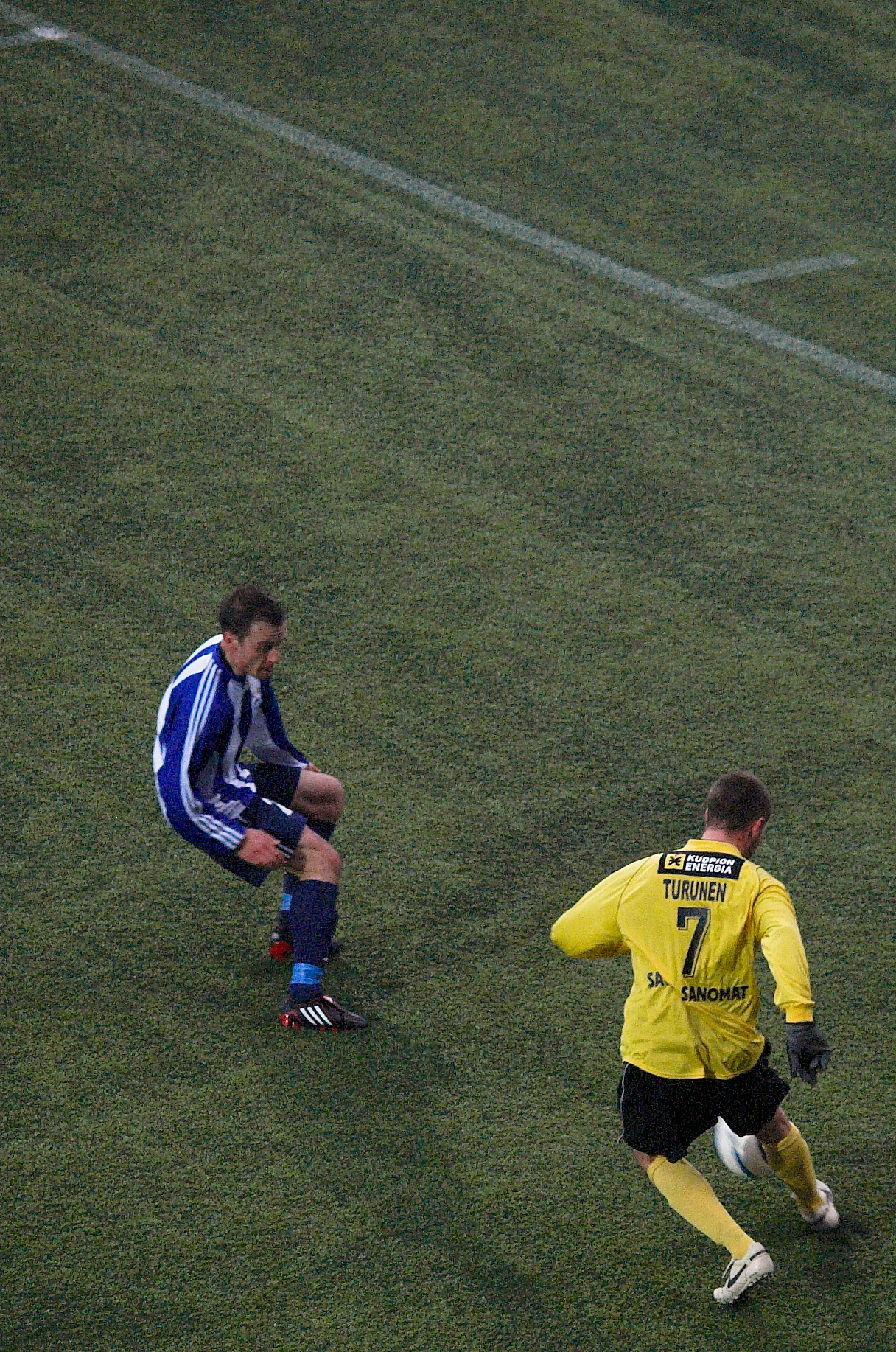
Miikka Turunen near the corner flag in Finnish League Cup, 2008

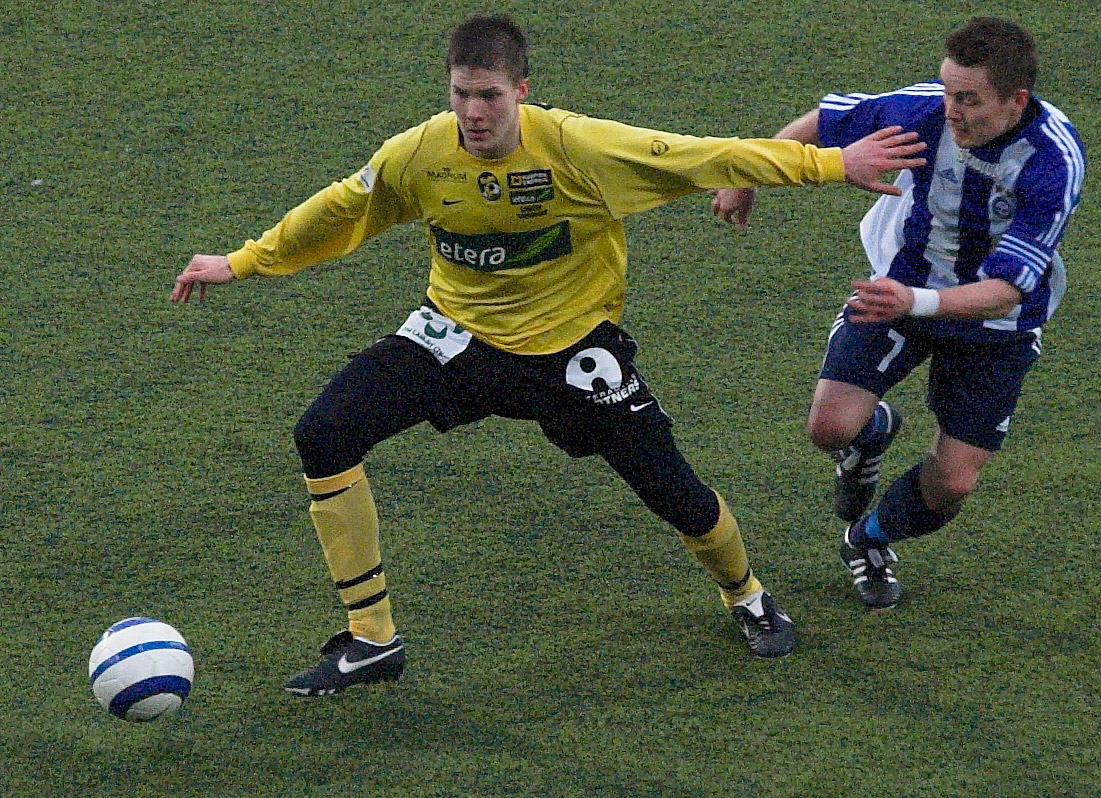
Arto Lindberg trying to keep Tuomas Haapala away

== Honours ==
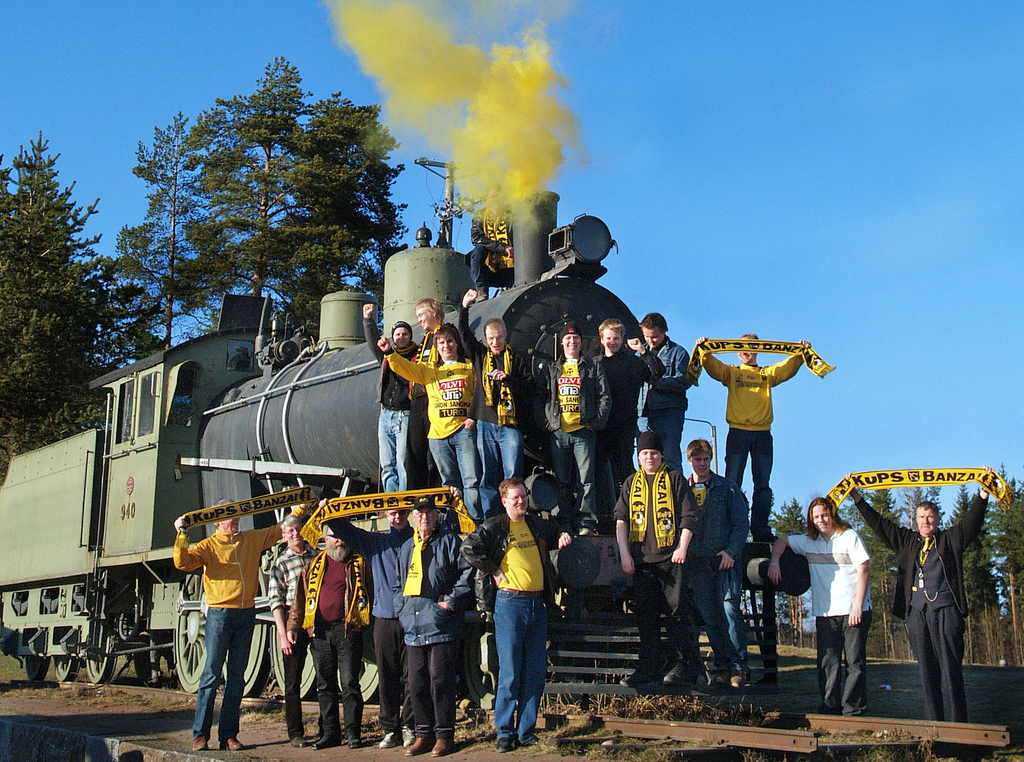
Supporters of KuPS in 2005

- Mestaruussarja/Veikkausliiga
  - Champions (8): 1956, 1958, 1966, 1974, 1976, 2019, 2024, 2025
  - Runners-up (13): 1950, 1954, 1964, 1967, 1969, 1975, 1977, 1979, 2010, 2017, 2021, 2022, 2023
  - Third place (3): 1953, 2018, 2020
- Finnish Cup
  - Champions (5): 1968, 1989, 2021, 2022, 2024
  - Runners-up (4): 2011, 2012, 2013, 2025
- Finnish League Cup
  - Champions (1): 2006
  - Runners-up (1): 2024
- Ykkönen (second tier)
  - Champions (3): 2000, 2004, 2007
- Kakkonen (third tier)
  - Champions (1): 1998

== Managers ==
- (Finland) Aaro Heikkinen (1945–57)
- (Hungary) Imre Nagy (1947)
- (Finland) Martti Kosma (1958)
- (Finland) Reino Miettinen (1959)
- (Finland) Veijo Pehkonen (1960)
- (Finland) Asser Väisänen (1960)
- (Finland) Aaro Heikkinen (1961–65)
- (Finland) Gunnar Boman (1966–68)
- (Finland) Veikko Jokinen (1969–71)
- (Finland) Unto Nevalainen (1969–71)
- (Finland) Martti Räsänen (1972–79)
- (Finland) Matti Terästö (initial term) (1980)
- (Finland) Jarmo Flink (final season) (1980)
- (Finland) Ari Savolainen (1981)
- (Finland) Matti Väänänen (1982)
- (Poland) Bogusław Hajdas (1983–85)
- (Finland) Jouko Pasanen (1986)
- (Finland) Jouko Pasanen (1987)
- (Finland) Aarre Miettinen (July 1987)
- (Finland) Heikki Turunen (1988)
- (Finland) Aarre Miettinen (1988)
- (Finland) Heikki Turunen (1989)
- (Finland) Markku Hyvärinen (May 1989)
- (Finland) Olavi Rissanen (May 1989)
- (Finland) Martti Räsänen (1990–91)
- (Finland) Olavi Rissanen (1990–91)
- (Finland) Martti Räsänen (1992)
- (Finland) Jouni Jäntti (Sept 1992)
- (Finland) Markku Hyvärinen (Sept 1992)
- (Finland) Keijo Voutilainen (1993–1994)
- (Finland) Hannu Turunen (1995–96)
- (Finland) Atik Ismail (1995–96)
- (Finland) Jouni Jäntti (1997–98)
- (Finland) Ensio Pellikka (1998)
- (Finland) Heikki Turunen (1999)
- (Finland) Esa Pekonen (2000–2001)
- (Finland) Jari Pyykölä (1 January 2002 – 6 June 2003)
- (Finland) Ismo Lius (June 2003)
- (Finland) Juha Malinen (2005–2006)
- (Finland) Kai Nyyssönen (1 January 2007 – 13 June 2009)
- (Finland) Esa Pekonen (14 June 2009 – 24 April 2014)
- (Finland) Marko Rajamäki (2 May 2014 – 2016)
- (Finland) Jani Honkavaara (2017–2019)
- (Norway) Arne Erlandsen (2020)
- (Finland) Simo Valakari (2021– 19 January 2023)
- (Finland) Pasi Tuutti (19 January 2023 – 20 April 2023)
- (Finland) Jani Honkavaara (21 April 2023– 31 December 2024)
- (Finland) Jarkko Wiss (1 January 2025 – 31 December 2025)
- (Finland) Miika Nuutinen (1 January 2026 – present)
