= Eemil Tanninen =

Finnish footballer (born 2007)

Personal information
- Date of birth: 4 April 2007 (age 19)
- Place of birth: Finland
- Position: Midfielder

Team information
- Current team: KuPS
- Number: 16

Youth career
- –2022: Jippo

Senior career*
Years	Team	Apps	(Gls)
2022–2024	Jippo	36	(5)
2025–	KuPS	2	(0)
2025–	KuPS Akatemia	25	(2)

International career^{‡}
2022	Finland U15	3	(1)
2022–2023	Finland U16	9	(0)
2023	Finland U17	2	(0)
2024–	Finland U18	1	(0)
- * Club domestic league appearances and goals as of 12 November 2026 ‡ National team caps and goals as of 26 November 2024

Eemil Tanninen (born 4 April 2007) is a Finnish professional football player who plays as a midfielder for Veikkausliiga side KuPS.

== Club career ==
Tanninen started football in his hometown club Jippo in Joensuu. He debuted with the first team in 2022 at the age of 15, playing in third-tier Kakkonen. At the end of the 2023, Jippo won promotion to the new second-tier Ykkösliiga via promotion play-offs. During the next 2024 season, Tanninen made 23 appearances and scored two goals, and helped Jippo to surprisingly finish 3rd in Ykkösliiga.

On 7 November 2024, Tanninen signed with Veikkausliiga club Kuopion Palloseura (KuPS) on a multi-year deal.

== Career statistics ==
As of 19 April 2025

Appearances and goals by club, season and competition
Club	Season	League			Cup (Note: Includes Suomen Cup)		League cup (Note: Includes Ykkösliigacup and Finnish League Cup)		Europe		Total	
Club	Season	Division	Apps	Goals	Apps	Goals	Apps	Goals	Apps	Goals	Apps	Goals
Jippo	2022	Kakkonen	2	0	0	0	–		–		2	0
Jippo	2023	Kakkonen	11	3	1	0	–		–		12	3
Jippo	2024	Ykkösliiga	23	2	1	0	4	0	–		28	2
Jippo	Total		36	5	2	0	4	0	0	0	42	5
KuPS	2025	Veikkausliiga	1	0	0	0	4	0	0	0	5	0
KuPS Akatemia	2025	Ykkönen	1	0	–		–		–		1	0
Career total			38	5	2	0	8	0	0	0	48	5
