= Valentin Gasc =

Argentine footballer

Personal information
- Full name: Valentin Román Gasc
- Date of birth: 9 October 2000 (age 26)
- Place of birth: Temperley, Argentina
- Height: 1.74 m (5 ft 9 in)
- Position: Midfielder

Team information
- Current team: KuPS
- Number: 10

Youth career
- Lanús

Senior career*
| Years | Team | Apps | (Gls) |
| 2021–2022 | SJK II | 39 | (10) |
| 2022–2025 | SJK | 89 | (7) |
| 2026– | KuPS | 29 | (2) |

International career^{‡}
| 2017 | Argentina U17 | 2 | (0) |
- * Club domestic league appearances and goals as of 12 November 2026 ‡ National team caps and goals as of 28 December 2022

Valentin Román Gasc (born 9 October 2000) is an Argentine professional footballer currently playing as a midfielder for Finnish club KuPS.

== Club career ==
Born in Temperley, Argentina, Gasc joined the reserve team of SJK in March 2021, from Lanús. Following good performances with the reserve team, and making his debut for SJK's first team, he was promoted full-time to the first team ahead of the 2023 season. On 6 April 2023, his contract was extended for the 2024 with an option for the 2025.

== International career ==
Gasc has represented Argentina at under-17 level.

== Career statistics ==
=== Club ===
As of 12 November 2026

Appearances and goals by club, season and competition
| Club | Season | League | | | Cup | | Europe | | Other | | Total | |
| Club | Season | Division | Apps | Goals | Apps | Goals | Apps | Goals | Apps | Goals | Apps | Goals |
|---|---|---|---|---|---|---|---|---|---|---|---|---|
| SJK Akatemia | 2021 | Kakkonen | 22 | 4 | – | | – | | 1 (Note: Appearances in the Kakkonen Cup) | 0 | 23 | 4 |
| SJK Akatemia | 2022 | Ykkönen | 17 | 6 | 2 (Note: Appearances in the Finnish Cup) | 1 | – | | 3 (Note: Includes Ykkönen cup) | 0 | 22 | 7 |
| SJK Akatemia | Total | | 39 | 10 | 2 | 1 | – | – | 4 | 0 | 45 | 11 |
| SJK | 2022 | Veikkausliiga | 6 | 0 | 0 | 0 | 0 | 0 | 0 | 0 | 6 | 0 |
| SJK | 2023 | Veikkausliiga | 27 | 3 | 1 | 0 | – | | 5 (Note: Appearances in Finnish League Cup) | 0 | 33 | 3 |
| SJK | 2024 | Veikkausliiga | 25 | 2 | 4 | 0 | – | | 5 | 1 | 34 | 3 |
| SJK | 2025 | Veikkausliiga | 31 | 2 | 2 | 2 | 2 (Note: Appearances in UEFA Conference League) | 0 | 5 | 0 | 37 | 4 |
| SJK | Total | | 89 | 7 | 7 | 2 | 2 | 0 | 15 | 1 | 113 | 10 |
| KuPS | 2026 | Veikkausliiga | 29 | 2 | 3 | 0 | 9 (Note: three Appearances in UEFA Conference League, two Appearances in UEFA Europa League, four Appearances in UEFA Champions League) | 1 | 2 | 0 | 43 | 3 |
| Career total | | | 157 | 17 | 12 | 3 | 11 | 1 | 21 | 1 | 201 | 24 |
