= Rasmus Tikkanen =

Finnish footballer (born 2007)

Personal information
- Date of birth: 10 May 2007 (age 19)
- Place of birth: Finland
- Height: 1.67 m (5 ft 6 in)
- Position: Left back

Team information
- Current team: KuPS
- Number: 32

Youth career
- PK-37
- KuPS

Senior career*
Years	Team	Apps	(Gls)
2023	PK-37	14	(0)
2024–	KuPS II	44	(2)
2025–	KuPS	5	(1)

International career^{‡}
2025	Finland U18	2	(0)
2025–	Finland U19	1	(0)
- * Club domestic league appearances and goals as of 12 November 2026 ‡ National team caps and goals as of 6 September 2025

Rasmus Tikkanen (born 10 May 2007) is a Finnish professional football player who plays as a left back for Veikkausliiga side KuPS.

== Career ==
Tikkanen has played for youth sectors of Pallo-Kerho 37 and Kuopion Palloseura. He made his senior debut with PK-37 in 2023 in fourth-tier Kolmonen. Next season he played for KuPS reserve team in third-tier Ykkönen.

On 6 February 2025, Tikkanen signed a professional contract with KuPS. Tikkanen made five appearances for KuPS first team in Finnish League Cup in 2025, providing three assists in total, and debuted in Veikkausliiga on 12 April, as a starting left-back in a 1–0 home win against AC Oulu. One week later, Tikkanen scored the winning goal in a 1–0 home win over FF Jaro, with his first Veikkausliiga goal.

== Career statistics ==
As of 6 September 2025

Appearances and goals by club, season and competition
Club	Season	League			National cup		League cup		Europe		Total	
Club	Season	Division	Apps	Goals	Apps	Goals	Apps	Goals	Apps	Goals	Apps	Goals
PK-37	2023	Kolmonen	14	0	3	0	–		–		17	0
KuPS Akatemia	2024	Ykkönen	14	2	–		–		–		14	2
KuPS Akatemia	2025	Ykkönen	9	0	–		–		–		9	0
KuPS Akatemia	Total		23	2	0	0	0	0	0	0	23	2
KuPS	2025	Veikkausliiga	5	1	1	0	5	0	0	0	11	1
Career total			42	3	4	0	5	0	0	0	51	3
