= Brahima Magassa =

French footballer (born 1997)

Personal information
- Date of birth: 17 April 1997 (age 29)
- Place of birth: Noisy-le-Sec, France
- Height: 1.92 m (6 ft 4 in)
- Position: Defender

Team information
- Current team: Kuopion Palloseura
- Number: 28

Youth career
- Paris FC

Senior career*
Years	Team	Apps	(Gls)
–2020	CO Vincennes		
2020–2022	Football Club Challans	26	(1)
2022–2023	Olympique Saumur FC	44	(4)
2024–2025	Les Herbiers VF	25	(1)
2025–2026	LB Châteauroux	22	(0)
2026–	KuPS	21	(1)
- * Club domestic league appearances and goals as of 12 November 2026

Brahima Magassa (born 17 April 1997) is a French professional footballer who plays as a defender for Kuopion Palloseura.

== Early life ==
Magassa was born on 17 April 1997 in France and is a native of Montreuil, France. Growing up, he was friends with France international Nordi Mukiele.

== Career ==
As a youth player, Magassa joined the youth academy of French side Paris FC. Following his stint there, he signed for French side CO Vincennes. During the summer of 2020, he signed for French side Football Club Challans, where he made twenty-six league appearances and scored one goal. Two years later, he signed for French side Olympique Saumur FC, where he made forty-four league appearances and scored four goals.

Subsequently, he signed for French side Les Herbiers VF in 2024, where he made twenty-five league appearances and scored one goal. One year later, he signed for French side LB Châteauroux, where he made twenty-two league appearances and scored zero goals. Ahead of the 2026 season, he signed for Finnish side Kuopion Palloseura.

== Style of play ==
Magassa plays as a defender. French newspaper Ouest-France wrote in 2023 that he is a "lanky... central defender (1.92 m), who can also play in midfield".
