= Bob Nii Armah =

Ghanaian footballer (born 2004)

Personal information
- Date of birth: 20 January 2004 (age 22)
- Place of birth: Accra, Ghana
- Height: 1.78 m (5 ft 10 in)
- Positions: Right-back; winger

Team information
- Current team: KuPS
- Number: 24

Senior career*
Years	Team	Apps	(Gls)
2021–2024	SC Accra		
2023–2024	→ SJK II (loan)	31	(5)
2024	→ SJK (loan)	0	(0)
2025–	KuPS	38	(6)
- * Club domestic league appearances and goals as of 12 November 2026

Bob Nii Armah (born 20 January 2004) is a Ghanaian professional footballer who plays as a defender or winger for Veikkausliiga club KuPS.

== Club career ==
Armah was first loaned to Finnish Veikkausliiga club SJK Seinäjoki organisation in August 2023. He was registered to their reserve team SJK Akatemia in Finnish second tier. His loan deal ended after the 2024 season.

In January 2025, Armah joined Veikkausliiga club Kuopion Palloseura. He made his Veikkausliiga debut on 25 May 2025.

== Career statistics ==
As of 5 August 2026

Appearances and goals by club, season and competition
Club	Season	League			National cup (Note: Includes Finnish Cup)		League cup (Note: Includes Ykkösliigacup and Finnish League Cup)		Europe		Total	
Club	Season	Division	Apps	Goals	Apps	Goals	Apps	Goals	Apps	Goals	Apps	Goals
SJK Akatemia (loan)	2023	Ykkönen	10	1	–		–		–		10	1
SJK Akatemia (loan)	2024	Ykkösliiga	21	4	0	0	6	0	–		27	4
SJK Akatemia (loan)	Total		31	5	0	0	6	0	0	0	37	5
SJK (loan)	2024	Veikkausliiga	0	0	2	0	3	0	–		5	0
KuPS	2025	Veikkausliiga	17	0	5	0	6	0	13 (Note: Three appearances in UEFA Champions League, four appearances in UEFA Europa League and six appearances in UEFA Conference League)	0	41	0
KuPS	2026	Veikkausliiga	14	5	3	0	2	0	4 (Note: Appearances in UEFA Champions League)	2	7	2
KuPS	Total		31	5	8	0	8	0	17	2	64	7
Career total			62	10	10	0	17	0	17	2	106	12

== Honours ==
KuPS

- Veikkausliiga: 2025
