= 2024 HJK season =

115th season in existence of HJK Helsinki

HJK
2024 season
- Chairman: Olli-Pekka Lyytikäinen
- Manager: Toni Korkeakunnas
- Stadium: Bolt Arena
- Veikkausliiga: 3rd
- Finnish Cup: Sixth round vs EIF
- League Cup: Group stage
- UEFA Champions League: First qualifying round vs Panevėžys
- UEFA Conference League: League phase
- Top goalscorer: League: Topi Keskinen; Luke Plange (6 each); All: Lee Erwin (11 goals)
- Highest home attendance: 8,835 vs Ilves (28 September 2024)
- Lowest home attendance: 400 vs IFK Mariehamn (26 January 2024)
- Average home league attendance: 6,361 (6 October 2024)
Home colours	Away colours	Third colours

The 2024 season is Helsingin Jalkapalloklubi's 116th competitive season. HJK entered the Veikkausliiga season as four-time defending champions.

== Season events ==
On 3 November 2023, HJK announced the appointment of Ferran Sibila as their new manager on a two-year deal. On 15 January, HJK announced that due to Sibila's lack of the required UEFA Pro -coaching license, Sibila is not eligible to work as a manager in Veikkausliiga, and was named the associate coach of HJK with interim manager Ossi Virta, until he is able to attend the required coaching training class.

On 18 December 2023, HJK announced the signing of Noah Pallas from AC Oulu to a three-year contract.

On 4 January, HJK announced the permanent signing of Lucas Lingman from Helsingborgs IF to a three-year contract. The following day, on 5 January, the reigning top goalscorer Bojan Radulović was sold to EFL Championship club Huddersfield Town for an undisclosed fee.

On 24 January, HJK announced the signing of Andreas Vaher from Freiburg II to on a contract until June, with the option to extended the contract until the end of the 2026 season, and the signing of Carlos Moros to a one-year contract after he'd left Djurgården at the end of the previous season.

On 29 January, The 2023 Defender of the Year Tuomas Ollila was sold to Ligue 2 club Paris FC for an undisclosed fee.

On 2 February, Hadi Noori joined AFC Eskilstuna on loan for the season.

On 6 February, HJK announced the signing of free-agent Hans Nunoo Sarpei to a two-year contract, with the option of a third year. The following day, 7 February, HJK extended their contract with Alex Ramula until the end of the season.

On 8 February, Aaro Soiniemi joined TPS on loan for the season.

On 14 February, HJK announced the signing of Brooklyn Lyons-Foster from Tottenham Hotspur to a two-year contract, with the option of a third year.

On 20 February, HJK signed with Diogo Tomas from Odd on a deal for the 2024 season.

On 15 March, HJK announced the season-long loan signing of Luke Plange from Crystal Palace.

On 4 April, Altti Hellemaa joined JäPS on loan until the end of July.

On 20 May, associate head coach Ferran Sibila and sporting director Vesa Mäki were both sacked, and last season's head coach Toni Korkeakunnas was appointed the manager until the end of 2025.

On 1 July, HJK announced the extension of Michael Boamah's contract until the end of the 2026 season with the option of an additional year, the return of Daniel O'Shaughnessy to the club from Karlsruher SC on a contract until the end of the 2025 season, and the departure of Andreas Vaher to Flora. The following day, 2 July, HJK announced the signing of Lee Erwin from Al Ahed on a contract for the rest of the season.

On 3 July, HJK announced the loan signing of Kevor Palumets from Zulte Waregem for the rest of the season with an option to make the move permanent. The following day, 4 July, HJK announced the permanent signing of Alessandro Albanese from Oostende on a contract for the remainder of the season with the option of an additional year.

On 9 July, Oliver Pettersson left HJK to sign for IF Gnistan.

On 11 July, HJK announced that they had signed a new contract with Pyry Mentu, until the end of the 2027 season. On the same day, Elmo Henriksson extended his contract with HJK until the end of the 2025 season, and joined Sporting Gijón on loan for a year with an option to make the move permanent.

On 15 July, HJK extended their contract with Stanislav Baranov until the end of the 2026 season.

On 17 July, Carlos Moros was released by HJK after his contract was terminated by mutual agreement. On the same day, HJK announced the signing of Thijmen Nijhuis from Utrecht on a contract until the end of the 2025 season.

On 18 July, HJK announced the signing of Georgios Antzoulas from Újpest on a contract until the end of the 2025 season, whilst Johannes Yli-Kokko left the club to sign for Inter Turku on a free transfer.

On 22 July, David Ezeh extended his contract with HJK until the end of 2026 and also joined Raków Częstochowa on loan until 21 March 2025, when Raków Częstochowa have an option to make the move permanent.

On 31 July, HJK announced the signing of Ozan Kökçü from FC Eindhoven on a contract until the end of the 2026 season.

On 6 August, HJK announced that Altti Hellemaa had left the club.

On 7 August, Aaro Toivonen and Stanislav Baranov both left HJK to join Tallinna Kalev on loan until the end of the season.

On 9 August, Jesse Öst signed a contract extension with HJK until the end of 2026.

On 12 August, Topi Keskinen was sold to Aberdeen for a "substantial fee", rumoured to be around €1 million, whilst Anthony Olusanya was loaned out to fellow Veikkausliiga club Haka for the rest of the season.

On 23 August, HJK announced that Samuel Anini Junior had left the club to join Ekenäs IF.

On 27 August, HJK announced the signing of Roni Hudd from VPS on a contract until 2026 with the option of an additional year.

On 29 August, Miska Ylitolva extended his contract with HJK until the end of the 2026 season, whilst Matias Ritari also extended his contract with HJK the following day, until the end of 2026 season with an option for the 2027 season.

On 2 September, Diogo Tomas left HJK to join ADO Den Haag.

== Squad ==
As of match played 7 November 2024

No.	Name	Nationality	Position	Date of birth (age)	Signed from	Signed in	Contract ends
Goalkeepers
1	Jesse Öst	(Finland)	GK	20 October 1990 (aged 34)	SJK	2023	2026
25	Thijmen Nijhuis	(Netherlands)	GK	25 July 1998 (aged 26)	Utrecht	2024	2025
78	Alex Ramula	(Finland)	GK	17 January 2005 (aged 19)	Klubi 04	2023	
85	Niki Mäenpää	(Finland)	GK	January 23, 1985 (aged 39)	Unattached	2023	
Defenders
2	Brooklyn Lyons-Foster	(England)	DF	1 December 2000 (aged 23)	Tottenham Hotspur	2024	2025 (+1)
3	Georgios Antzoulas	(Greece)	GK	4 February 2000 (aged 24)	Újpest	2024	2025
4	Joona Toivio	(Finland)	DF	10 March 1988 (aged 36)	BK Häcken	2022	2024
5	Daniel O'Shaughnessy	(Finland)	DF	14 September 1994 (aged 30)	Karlsruher SC	2024	2025
6	Aapo Halme	(Finland)	DF	22 May 1998 (aged 26)	Barnsley	2022	2024
24	Michael Boamah	(Finland)	DF	16 April 2003 (aged 21)	Klubi 04	2023	2026
27	Kevin Kouassivi-Benissan	(Finland)	DF	25 January 1999 (aged 25)	Klubi 04	2018	2025
28	Miska Ylitolva	(Finland)	DF	23 May 2004 (aged 20)	RoPS	2022	2026
Midfielders
8	Georgios Kanellopoulos	(Greece)	MF	29 January 2000 (aged 24)	Asteras Tripolis	2023	2024(+1)
10	Lucas Lingman	(Finland)	MF	25 January 1998 (aged 26)	Helsingborg	2024	2026
21	Niilo Kujasalo	(Finland)	MF	17 March 2004 (aged 20)	Klubi 04	2023	
22	Liam Möller	(Finland)	MF	21 December 2004 (aged 19)	Klubi 04	2023	2024
23	Ozan Kökçü	(Azerbaijan)	MF	18 August 1998 (aged 26)	FC Eindhoven	2025	2026
30	Noah Pallas	(Finland)	MF	9 February 2004 (aged 20)	AC Oulu	2024	2026
37	Atomu Tanaka	(Japan)	MF	4 October 1987 (aged 37)	Cerezo Osaka	2020	2024
80	Kevor Palumets	(Estonia)	MF	21 November 2002 (aged 21)	on loan from Zulte Waregem	2024	2024
Forwards
7	Santeri Hostikka	(Finland)	FW	30 September 1997 (aged 27)	Pogoń Szczecin	2021	2024
9	Luke Plange	(England)	FW	4 November 2002 (aged 22)	on loan from Crystal Palace	2024	2024
17	Hassane Bandé	(Burkina Faso)	FW	30 October 1998 (aged 26)	Amiens	2023	2025
20	Roni Hudd	(Finland)	FW	20 January 2005 (aged 19)	VPS	2024	2026(+1)
42	Kai Meriluoto	(Finland)	FW	2 January 2003 (aged 21)	Klubi 04	2020	2025
94	Lee Erwin	(Scotland)	FW	19 March 1994 (aged 30)	Al Ahed	2024	2024
99	Alessandro Albanese	(Belgium)	FW	12 January 2000 (aged 24)	KV Oostende	2024	2024 (+1)
Klubi 04
45	Lukas Kuusisto	(Finland)	DF	25 February 2005 (aged 19)	Klubi 04	2023	
47	Emil Leveälahti	(Finland)	DF	22 August 2006 (aged 18)	Klubi 04	2024	
48	Francis Etu	(Nigeria)	FW	10 April 2004 (aged 20)	Klubi 04	2023	2025
49	Otto Hannula	(Finland)	MF	29 September 2005 (aged 19)	Klubi 04	2023	
51	Kaius Hardén	(Finland)	FW	10 June 2004 (aged 20)	Klubi 04	2022	
53	Jere Kari	(Finland)	DF	24 February 2007 (aged 17)	Klubi 04	2024	
54	Pyry Mentu	(Finland)	MF	1 November 2006 (aged 18)	Klubi 04	2022	2027
57	Lukas Kuusisto	(Finland)	DF	25 February 2005 (aged 19)	Klubi 04	2023	
61	Kaius Simojoki	(Finland)	DF	21 March 2006 (aged 18)	KäPa	2024	
62	Nils Svensson	(Sweden)	DF	9 May 2002 (aged 22)	Vänersborgs IF	2023	2024(+1)
63	Eemil Toivonen	(Finland)	MF	12 December 2006 (aged 17)	Klubi 04	2023	
64	Matias Ritari	(Finland)	MF	15 July 2005 (aged 19)	Klubi 04	2023	2026(+1)
67	Emil Ingman	(Finland)	FW	1 July 2006 (aged 18)	Klubi 04	2024	
72	Art Berisha	(Kosovo)	MF	24 April 2006 (aged 18)	Klubi 04	2023	
74	Marlo Hyvönen	(Finland)	MF	2 May 2005 (aged 19)	Honka	2024	
79	Joel Tynkkynen	(Finland)	GK	25 January 2006 (aged 18)	Klubi 04	2024	
87	Elmer Vauhkonen	(Finland)	FW	3 January 2006 (aged 18)	Klubi 04	2024	
89	Diar Azabani	(Finland)	GK	16 February 2006 (aged 18)	PKKU	2024	
91	Ville Vuorinen	(Finland)	FW	21 February 2005 (aged 19)	Klubi 04	2023	
92	Mustafa Abdulrasoul	(Finland)	DF	8 June 2006 (aged 18)	Klubi 04	2024	
94	Toivo Mero	(Finland)	FW	7 October 2007 (aged 17)	Klubi 04	2024	
96	William Grönblom	(Finland)	DF	13 January 2005 (aged 19)	Klubi 04	2023	
98	Alex Lietsa	(Finland)	DF	15 February 2005 (aged 19)	Klubi 04	2023	
Away on loan
11	Anthony Olusanya	(Finland)	FW	1 February 2000 (aged 24)	FF Jaro	2021	2025
18	Aaro Toivonen	(Finland)	MF	19 April 2005 (aged 19)	Klubi 04	2022	2025
19	David Ezeh	(Finland)	FW	13 February 2006 (aged 18)	Klubi 04	2023	2026
81	Elmo Henriksson	(Finland)	GK	10 March 2003 (aged 21)	Klubi 04	2021	2025
95	Stanislav Baranov	(Finland)	FW	15 April 2005 (aged 19)	Klubi 04	2023	2026
	Aaro Soiniemi	(Finland)	DF	8 August 2005 (aged 19)	KäPa	2024	
Left during the season
5	Carlos Moros	(Spain)	DF	15 April 1993 (aged 31)	Unattached	2024	2024
14	Hans Nunoo Sarpei	(Ghana)	MF	22 August 1998 (aged 26)	Unattached	2024	2025 (+1)
15	Andreas Vaher	(Estonia)	DF	15 April 2004 (aged 20)	Freiburg II	2024	2024 (+2.5)
18	Topi Keskinen	(Finland)	FW	7 March 2003 (aged 21)	Mikkelin Palloilijat	2023	2025
20	Johannes Yli-Kokko	(Finland)	MF	24 August 2001 (aged 23)	Klubi 04	2022	2024
41	Samuel Anini Junior	(Finland)	FW	7 September 2002 (aged 22)	PK Keski-Uusimaa	2019	2024
43	Santeri Silander	(Finland)	DF	20 April 2004 (aged 20)	Klubi 04	2023	
45	Diogo Tomas	(Finland)	DF	31 July 1997 (aged 27)	Odd	2024	2024
46	Oliver Pettersson	(Finland)	DF	13 May 2003 (aged 21)	EIF	2022	2024
75	Altti Hellemaa	(Finland)	MF	25 July 2004 (aged 20)	KäPa	2022	

== Transfers ==
=== In ===
Date	Position	Nationality	Name	From	Fee	Ref.
18 December 2023†	MF	(Finland)	Noah Pallas	AC Oulu	Undisclosed	
4 January 2024	MF	(Finland)	Lucas Lingman	Helsingborgs IF	Undisclosed	
24 January 2024	DF	(Spain)	Carlos Moros	Unattached	Free	
24 January 2024	DF	(Estonia)	Andreas Vaher	Freiburg II	Undisclosed	
6 February 2024	MF	(Ghana)	Hans Nunoo Sarpei	Unattached	Free	
14 February 2024	DF	(England)	Brooklyn Lyons-Foster	Tottenham Hotspur	Undisclosed	
20 February 2024	DF	(Finland)	Diogo Tomas	Odd	Undisclosed	
1 July 2024	DF	(Finland)	Daniel O'Shaughnessy	Karlsruher SC	Free	
2 July 2024	FW	(Scotland)	Lee Erwin	Al Ahed	Undisclosed	
4 July 2024	MF	(Belgium)	Alessandro Albanese	KV Oostende	Undisclosed	
17 July 2024	GK	(Netherlands)	Thijmen Nijhuis	Utrecht	Undisclosed	
18 July 2024	DF	(Greece)	Georgios Antzoulas	Újpest	Undisclosed	
31 July 2024	MF	(Azerbaijan)	Ozan Kökçü	FC Eindhoven	Undisclosed	
27 August 2024	FW	(Finland)	Roni Hudd	VPS	Undisclosed	

† Transfers announced on the above date, being finalised on 1 January 2024.

=== Loans in ===
Start date	Position	Nationality	Name	From	End date	Ref.
15 March 2024	FW	(England)	Luke Plange	Crystal Palace	31 December 2024	
3 July 2024	MF	(Estonia)	Kevor Palumets	Zulte Waregem	31 December 2024	

=== Out ===
Date	Position	Nationality	Name	To	Fee	Ref.
5 January 2024	FW	(Serbia)	Bojan Radulović	Huddersfield Town	£1 million	
29 January 2024	DF	(Finland)	Tuomas Ollila	Paris FC	Undisclosed	
1 July 2024	DF	(Estonia)	Andreas Vaher	Flora	Undisclosed	
9 July 2024	DF	(Finland)	Oliver Pettersson	IF Gnistan	Undisclosed	
18 July 2024	MF	(Finland)	Johannes Yli-Kokko	Inter Turku	Free	
12 August 2024	FW	(Finland)	Topi Keskinen	Aberdeen	£850,000	
26 August 2024	DF	(Finland)	Santeri Silander	OLS	Undisclosed	
23 August 2024	FW	(Finland)	Samuel Anini Junior	Ekenäs IF	Undisclosed	
2 September 2024	DF	(Finland)	Diogo Tomas	ADO Den Haag	Undisclosed	

=== Loans out ===
Start date	Position	Nationality	Name	To	End date	Ref.
2 February 2024	MF	(Sweden)	Hadi Noori	AFC Eskilstuna	31 December 2024	
8 February 2024	DF	(Finland)	Aaro Soiniemi	TPS	31 December 2024	
4 April 2024	MF	(Finland)	Altti Hellemaa	JäPS	31 July 2024	
11 July 2024	GK	(Finland)	Elmo Henriksson	Sporting Gijón	30 June 2025	
22 July 2024	FW	(Finland)	David Ezeh	Raków Częstochowa	21 March 2025	
7 August 2024	MF	(Finland)	Aaro Toivonen	Tallinna Kalev	31 December 2024	
7 August 2024	FW	(Finland)	Stanislav Baranov	Tallinna Kalev	31 December 2024	
12 August 2024	FW	(Finland)	Anthony Olusanya	Haka	31 December 2024	

=== Released ===
Date	Position	Nationality	Name	Joined	Date	Ref.
27 January 2024	DF	(Finland)	Patrik Raitanen	IFK Mariehamn	27 January 2024	
17 July 2024	DF	(Spain)	Carlos Moros	Degerfors	7 August 2024	
6 August 2024	MF	(Finland)	Altti Hellemaa	JäPS		
1 November 2024	MF	(Ghana)	Hans Nunoo Sarpei			
31 December 2024	FW	(Scotland)	Lee Erwin	Gostivari	3 February 2025	

== Friendlies ==
11 February 2024	Hammarby	1–2	HJK	Stockholm, Sweden
EET (UTC+2)	Fenger 63'	Report	Keskinen 71'; Olusanya 81'	Stadium: Tele2 Arena

27 February 2024	HJK	2–1	Ahal FK	Belek, Turkey
EET (UTC+2)	Toivonen; Olusanya	Report	Goal

4 March 2024	HJK	3–1	Istiklol Dushanbe	Belek, Turkey
EET (UTC+2)	Olusanya; Kanellopoulos; Anini	Report	(o.g.)

28 March 2024	HJK	5–1	TPS	Helsinki
EET (UTC+2)	Plange 14', 35'; 20' (o.g.); Keskinen 77'; Kanellopoulos 81'	Report	Saarikivi 88'	Stadium: Bolt Arena

29 March 2024	HJK	1–1	PK-35	Helsinki
EET (UTC+2)	Yli-Kokko 39'	Report	Markkanen 59'	Stadium: Bolt Arena; Attendance: 645

21 November 2024	Shamrock Rovers	0–2	HJK	Dublin
EET (UTC+2)		Report	Meriluoto; Olusanya	Stadium: Tallaght Stadium

22 November 2024	Shamrock Rovers	0–4	HJK	Dublin
EET (UTC+2)		Report	Hudd; Erwin; Erwin; Tanaka	Stadium: Tallaght Stadium

5 December 2024	Djurgården	v	HJK	Stockholm
17:00 EET (UTC+2)				Stadium: Tele2 Arena; Attendance: 0

== Competitions ==
=== Overall record ===
Competition	First match	Last match	Starting round	Final position	Record							
Competition	First match	Last match	Starting round	Final position	Pld	W	D	L	GF	GA	GD	Win %
Veikkausliiga	6 April 2024	19 October 2024	Matchday 1	3rd	27	13	6	8	44	27	+17	48.15
Finnish Cup	16 June 2024	26 June 2024	Fifth round	Sixth round	2	1	1	0	5	0	+5	50.00
League Cup	26 January 2024	2 March 2024	Group stage	Group stage	5	3	0	2	0	0	+0	60.00
UEFA Champions League	9 July 2024	16 July 2024	First qualifying round	First qualifying round	2	0	1	1	1	4	−3	0.00
UEFA Conference League	8 August 2024	19 December 2024	Third qualifying round	League phase	10	3	2	5	9	14	−5	30.00
Total					46	20	10	16	59	45	+14	43.48

Last updated: 19 December 2024
Source: Competitions

=== Veikkausliiga ===
==== Regular season ====
===== Table =====
Pos	Team	Pld	W	D	L	GF	GA	GD	Pts	Qualification
1	KuPS	22	13	5	4	39	22	+17	44	Qualification for the Championship Round
2	HJK	22	13	4	5	41	21	+20	43	Qualification for the Championship Round
3	Ilves	22	11	6	5	45	25	+20	39	Qualification for the Championship Round
4	SJK	22	10	6	6	40	33	+7	36	Qualification for the Championship Round
5	Haka	22	10	5	7	35	32	+3	35	Qualification for the Championship Round

Source: Flashscore
Rules for classification: 1) Points; 2) Goal difference; 3) Goals scored; 4) Head-to-head points; 5) Head-to-head goal difference; 6) Head-to-head away goals scored; 7) Play-off
(Note: Play-off is only played if need to decide champion, teams for relegation or UEFA competition and will be played on a neutral ground).

===== Results summary =====
Overall								Home						Away					
Pld	W	D	L	GF	GA	GD	Pts	W	D	L	GF	GA	GD	W	D	L	GF	GA	GD
22	13	4	5	41	21	+20	43	8	2	1	22	6	+16	5	2	4	19	15	+4

Last updated: 1 September 2024.
Source: See Matches

===== Matches =====
6 April 2024 1	KuPS	3–1	HJK	Kuopio
19:00 EEST (UTC+3)	Olusanya 25' (o.g.); Miettinen (yellow card) 38'; Pennanen (yellow card) 47' (goal) 77'; Savolainen 66'	Report	Kanellopoulos (yellow card) 50'; Ezeh 90+7'	Stadium: Kuopio Football Stadium; Attendance: 3,084; Referee: Oliver Reitala

11 April 2024 2	HJK	4–0	Lahti	Helsinki
18:00 EEST (UTC+3)	Keskinen 20', 44'; Sarpei (yellow card) 43'; Lingman 57' (pen.); Kanellopoulos (yellow card) 61'; Bandé 69'	Report	Viitikko (yellow card) 34'	Stadium: Bolt Arena; Attendance: 5,039; Referee: Joona Manninen

20 April 2024 3	HJK	2–1	IFK Mariehamn	Helsinki
15:00 EEST (UTC+3)	Toivio 11'; Olusanya (yellow card) 17'; Lingman (yellow card) 61'; Keskinen 66'; Kouassivi-Benissan (yellow card) 81'	Report	Patut (yellow card) 49'; Larsson 89'	Stadium: Bolt Arena; Attendance: 6,100; Referee: Matti Roth

24 April 2024 15	SJK	3–3	HJK	Seinäjoki
19:00 EEST (UTC+3)	Moreno 7'; Karjalainen 53'; Gasc (yellow card) 70'; Paananen 88'; Lehtinen (yellow card) 90+2'; Pires (yellow card) 90+3'	Report	Bande (yellow card) 18'; Halme (yellow card) 35'; Lyons-Foster 45+3'; Olusanya 57'; Keskinen 62'	Stadium: OmaSP Stadion; Attendance: 2,113; Referee: Peiman Simani

27 April 2024 4	Haka	1–1	HJK	Valkeakoski
15:00 EEST (UTC+3)	Friberg 13'; Kilo (yellow card) 60'; Morais (yellow card) 90+4'	Report	Plange 54'; Lyons-Foster (yellow card) 57'; Kanellopoulos (yellow card) 70'	Stadium: Tehtaan kenttä Attendance: 2,024; Referee: Dennis Antamo

4 May 2024 5	HJK	0–0	EIF	Helsinki
17:00 EEST (UTC+3)	Keskinen (yellow card) 76'	Report	Lehtonen (yellow card) 60'; Almeida (yellow card) 90+7'	Stadium: Bolt Arena; Attendance: 5,012; Referee: Peiman Simani

11 May 2024 6	Inter Turku	0–1	HJK	Turku
19:00 EEST (UTC+3)	Almén (yellow card) 81'; Botué (yellow card) 89' (yellow-red card) 90+3'	Report	Tomas (yellow card) 32'; Olusanya 39'	Stadium: Veritas Stadion; Attendance: 4,023; Referee: Antti Munukka

17 May 2024 7	HJK	1–2	VPS	Helsinki
18:00 EEST (UTC+3)	Lingman (yellow card) 73'; Tomas 90+1'	Report	Borchers 29' (pen.); Räisänen 66'; Nuorela (yellow card) 90'; Niemi (yellow card) 90+4'	Stadium: Bolt Arena; Attendance: 7,445; Referee: Joni Hyytiä

22 May 2024 19	HJK	1–0	Gnistan	Helsinki
18:00 EEST (UTC+3)	Lingman 13'	Report	Sarr (yellow card) 27'; Latonen (yellow card) 29'; Raitala (yellow card) 60'; Penninkangas (yellow card) 65'; Agbo (yellow card) 68' (yellow-red card) 76'	Stadium: Bolt Arena; Attendance: 8,064; Referee: Oliver Reitala

25 May 2024 8	HJK	1–1	Ilves	Helsinki
17:00 EEST (UTC+3)	Keskinen (yellow card) 21'; Plange 66'; Hostikka (yellow card) 76'; Sarpei (yellow card) 90+1'	Report	Haarala 24' (pen.) (yellow card) 65'; Arifi (yellow card) 45'; Pikkarainen (yellow card) 51'; Popovitch (yellow card) 90+3'	Stadium: Bolt Arena; Attendance: 7,304; Referee: Oskari Hämäläinen

31 May 2024 9	AC Oulu	1–0	HJK	Oulu
20:00 EEST (UTC+3)	Rennicks 35'; Metaxas (yellow card) 55'; Taskila (yellow card) 75'; Jokelainen (yellow card) 90+1'	Report	Olusanya (yellow card) 38'; Tomas (red card) 80'; Pallas (yellow card) 89'	Stadium: Raatti Stadium; Attendance: 2,929; Referee: Ville Nevalainen

7 June 2024 10	HJK	4–1	SJK	Helsinki
20:00 EEST (UTC+3)	Lingman 33' (pen.); Olusanya (yellow card) 69'; Plange 78', 83', 90+4'; Halme (yellow card) 79'; Lingman (yellow card) 90+1'	Report	Ndiaye 5', (yellow card) 90+2'; Yussif (yellow card) 45'	Stadium: Bolt Arena; Attendance: 5,216; Referee: Oliver Reitala

12 June 2024 11	Gnistan	0–4	HJK	Helsinki
19.00 EEST (UTC+3)	Raitala (yellow card) 56'	Report	Sarr 3' (o.g.); Keskinen 36'; Halme (yellow card) 42'; Hostikka 82'; Baranov 90+2'	Stadium: Mustapekka Areena; Attendance: 3,024; Referee: Peiman Simani

19 June 2024 12	HJK	3–1	KuPS	Helsinki
21:00 EEST (UTC+3)	Tomas (yellow card) 71'; Lingman (yellow card) 73'; Möller 81'; Pallas 82'; Plange 90+3'	Report	Pennanen 38'; Siltanen (yellow card) 89'; Honkavaara (yellow card) 90+3'	Stadium: Bolt Arena; Attendance: 6,291; Referee: Antti Munukka

30 June 2024 13	IFK Mariehamn	1–2	HJK	Mariehamn
16:00 EEST (UTC+3)	Machado (yellow card) 18'; Larsson 28'; Olawale (yellow card) 43'	Report	Fonsell 6' (o.g.); Kanellopoulos (yellow card) 46'; Halme 64'	Stadium: Wiklöf Holding Arena; Attendance: 1,464; Referee: Petri Viljanen

6 July 2024 14	Ilves	3–0	HJK	Tampere
15:00 EEST (UTC+3)	Veteli 4' (yellow card) 59'; Haarala 13'; Riski (yellow card) 53' (goal) 77'; Mäenpää (yellow card) 89'	Report	Tomas (yellow card) 53'; Keskinen (yellow card) 85'	Stadium: Tammelan Stadion; Attendance: 7,952; Referee: Mohammad Al-Emara

20 July 2024 16	HJK	2–0	Haka	Helsinki
17:00 EEST (UTC+3)	Keskinen 23'; Erwin 53'	Report	Bah-Traoré (yellow card) 34'; Whyte (yellow card) 61'; Morais (yellow card) 61'; Talo (yellow card) 88'	Stadium: Bolt Arena; Attendance: 6,329; Referee: Ville Nevalainen

27 July 2024 17	HJK	3–0	Oulu	Helsinki
17:00 EEST (UTC+3)	Tomas 45+4'; Hostikka 66'; Erwin 72'	Report	A.Paananen (yellow card) 31'	Stadium: Bolt Arena; Attendance: 6,136; Referee: Petri Viljanen

3 August 2024 18	Lahti	2–1	HJK	Lahti
19:00 EEST (UTC+3)	López 34', 56' (yellow card) 63'; Mulahalilovic (yellow card) 56'; Jordão (yellow card) 80'; Babiker (yellow card) 90+3'; Koskinen (yellow card) 90+3'; Maukonen (yellow card) 90+5'	Report	Pallas (yellow card) 6'; Erwin 26'; Lyons-Foster (yellow card) 53'; Halme (yellow card) 59'	Stadium: Lahti Stadium; Attendance: 3,471; Referee: Antti Munukka

18 August 2024 20	EIF	0–3	HJK	Ekenäs
16:00 EEST (UTC+3)	Fofana (yellow card) 35'; Katz (yellow card) 55'; Mohammed (yellow card) 66'	Report	Bandé 56', 72'; Möller 79'; Plange (yellow card) 90'	Stadium: Ekenäs Sparbank Arena; Attendance: 1,640; Referee: Dennis Antamo

25 August 2024 21	HJK	1–0	Inter Turku	Helsinki
16:00 EEST (UTC+3)	Möller (yellow card) 29'; Halme (yellow card) 55' (goal) 71'	Report		Stadium: Bolt Arena; Attendance: 5,802; Referee: Peiman Simani

1 September 2024 22	VPS	1–3	HJK	Vaasa
16:00 EEST (UTC+3)	Engström 5'; Bashkirov (yellow card) 61'	Report	Meriluoto 10', 50'; Bandé (yellow card) 12'; Kanellopoulos (yellow card) 54'; Erwin 84' (pen.)	Stadium: Hietalahti Stadium; Attendance: 3,097; Referee: Mohammad Al-Emara

==== Championship Round ====
===== Table =====
Pos	Team	Pld	W	D	L	GF	GA	GD	Pts	Qualification
1	KuPS (C)	27	17	5	5	46	24	+22	56	Qualification for the Champions League first qualifying round
2	Ilves	27	16	6	5	56	27	+29	54	Qualification for the Europa League first qualifying round (Note: The 2024 Finnish Cup winners qualified for the Conference League second qualifying round. Since the cup winners (KuPS) qualified based on league position, the Conference League second round spot was passed to the second-placed team. However due to the 2024-25 UEFA Conference League titleholders qualifying directly for the Champions League via their own domestic league, the spot reserved in the Europa League for the Conference League titleholders was vacated, and after rebalancing, the spot in the Conference League second qualifying round was transferred to the Europa League first qualifying round.)
3	HJK	27	13	6	8	44	27	+17	45	Qualification for the Conference League first qualifying round (Note: Since the Conference League second qualifying round spot was passed to the second-placed team, the Conference League first round spot was passed to the third-placed team, the Conference League play-off final spot was passed to the fourth-placed team, and the fourth Conference League play-off quarter-final spot was passed to the eighth-placed team.)
4	SJK (O)	27	11	7	9	46	44	+2	40	Qualification for the Conference League first qualifying round play-off final
5	VPS	27	11	6	10	43	45	−2	39	Qualification for the Conference League first qualifying round play-off quarter-finals

Source: Flashscore
Rules for classification: 1) Points; 2) Goal difference; 3) Goals scored; 4) Head-to-head points; 5) Head-to-head goal difference; 6) Head-to-head away goals scored; 7) Play-off
(Note: Play-off is only played if need to decide champion, teams for relegation or UEFA competition and will be played on a neutral ground).
(C) Champions; (O) Play-off winners

===== Results summary =====
Overall								Home						Away					
Pld	W	D	L	GF	GA	GD	Pts	W	D	L	GF	GA	GD	W	D	L	GF	GA	GD
5	0	2	3	3	6	−3	2	0	1	2	2	4	−2	0	1	1	1	2	−1

Last updated: 19 October 2024.
Source: See Matches

===== Results =====
14 September 2024 23	HJK	2–2	SJK	Helsinki
15:00 EEST (UTC+3)	Lingman 45+1'; Palumets 68'; Kanellopoulos (yellow card) 71'; Pallas (yellow card) 82'	Report	Gasc (yellow card) 24'; Ndiaye 42'; Fati (yellow card) 54'; Moreno 90+2' (pen.)	Stadium: Bolt Arena; Attendance: 5,591; Referee: Joona Manninen

20 September 2024 24	VPS	1–1	HJK	Vaasa
20:00 EEST (UTC+3)	Ahiabu (yellow card) 44'; Lindeman 72'; Ogude (yellow card) 77'; Pitkänen (yellow card) 90+2'	Report	Erwin 33'; Pallas (yellow card) 75'; Kanellopoulos (yellow card) 79'; Lingman (yellow card) 86'; Antzoulas (yellow card) 90'; Nijhuis (yellow card) 90+2'	Stadium: Hietalahti Stadium; Attendance: 2,614; Referee: Antti Munukka

28 September 2024 25	HJK	0–1	Ilves	Helsinki
19:30 EEST (UTC+3)	Erwin (yellow card) 15'; Palumets (yellow card) 52'; Möller (yellow card) 78'; Tanaka (yellow card) 79'; Lyons-Foster (yellow card) 90+2'	Report	Arifi (yellow card) 52'; Riski 82'	Stadium: Bolt Arena; Attendance: 8,835; Referee: Oliver Reitala

6 October 2024 26	HJK	0–1	Haka	Helsinki
18:30 EEST (UTC+3)		Report	Patoulidis 36' (yellow card) 41'; Lanquedoc (yellow card) 50'; Ndam (yellow card) 63'; Lepola (yellow card) 88'; Mastokangas (yellow card) 89'	Stadium: Bolt Arena; Attendance: 5,896; Referee: Antti Munukka

19 October 2024 27	KuPS	1–0	HJK	Kuopio
18:00 EEST (UTC+3)	Pennanen 17' (yellow card) 90+6'	Report	Kanellopoulos (yellow card) 45+1'; Lyons-Foster (yellow card) 89'; Kökçü (yellow card) 90+6'	Stadium: Kuopio Football Stadium; Attendance: 8,543; Referee: Peiman Simani

=== Finnish Cup ===
16 June 2024 Fifth round	TuPS	0–5	HJK	Hyrylä
18:00 EEST (UTC+3)	Backström (yellow card) 5'; Honkanen (yellow card) 24'; Purhonen (yellow card) 80'	Report	Ezeh 9', 90+3'; Möller 13'; Tomas (yellow card) 24'; Baranov 30', 89'	Stadium: Hyrylä TN; Attendance: 2,271; Referee: Abdirahman Sugulle

26 June 2024 Sixth round	EIF	0–0 (4–2 p)	HJK	Ekenäs
18:30 EEST (UTC+3)	Kanté (yellow card) 44'; Katz (yellow card) 51'; Pallas (yellow card) 60'	Report	Ritari (yellow card) 39'; Tomas (yellow card) 53'; Kanellopoulos (yellow card) 59'; Yli-Kokko (yellow card) 70'; Plange (yellow card) 90+6'	Stadium: Ekenäs Sparbank Arena; Attendance: 1,435; Referee: Juuso Vuorinen
	Penalties
	Yefimov (penalty scored); Ojala (penalty scored); Fofana (penalty missed); Lindholm (penalty scored); Katz1 (penalty scored)		(penalty scored) Möller; (penalty missed) Tanaka; (penalty missed) Hostikka; (penalty scored) Tomas

=== League Cup ===
==== Group Stage ====
26 January 2024 1	HJK	1–0	IFK Mariehamn	Helsinki
14:00 EEST (UTC+3)	Sarpei (yellow card) 75'; Moros (red card) 78'; Olusanya 82'	Report		Stadium: Tali Halli TN; Attendance: 400; Referee: Oliver Reitala

3 February 2024 2	IF Gnistan	1–2	HJK	Helsinki
14:00 EEST (UTC+3)	Sarr 45+1' (yellow card) 78'	Report	Vaher (yellow card) 34'; Olusanya 38'; Keskinen 82'	Stadium: Tali Halli TN; Attendance: 450; Referee: Dennis Antamo

17 February 2024 3	HJK	1–2	Inter Turku	Helsinki
14:00 EEST (UTC+3)	Moros (yellow card) 16'; Olusanya 25' (yellow card) 88'; Hostikka (yellow card) 33'; Pallas (yellow card) 75'	Report	Kouame 16' (pen.); Granlund 33'; Kuittinen (yellow card) 66'; Hämäläinen (yellow card) 83'; Smith (red card) 90+2'; Purosalo (yellow card) 90+4'	Stadium: Tali Halli TN; Attendance: 500; Referee: Mohammad Al-Emara

27 February 2024 4	Lahti	3–0	HJK	Helsinki
14:00 EEST (UTC+3)	Odutayo 10' (yellow card) 42'; Jäntti (yellow card) 14'; Ritari 36' (o.g.); López (yellow card) 62' (goal) 90+4'; Virta (yellow card) 76'; Koskinen (yellow card) 83'	Report	Ramula (yellow card) 62'	Stadium: Tali Halli TN; Attendance: 1 Referee: Joona Manninen

2 March 2024 5	HJK	4–1	EIF	Helsinki
14:00 EEST (UTC+3)	Vuorinen 39'; Hannula 43'; Vauhkonen 45'; Ritari 50' (pen.); Etu (yellow card) 70'; Simojoki (yellow card) 80'	Report	Lindholm (yellow card) 17'; Vehkonen 54'	Stadium: Tali Halli TN; Attendance: 500; Referee: Dennis Antamo

=== UEFA Champions League ===
==== Qualifying rounds ====
9 July 2024 First qualifying round 1st leg	Panevėžys (Lithuania)	3–0	(Finland) HJK	Panevėžys, Lithuania
18:30 EEST (UTC+3)	Veliulis 17'; Rasimavičius (yellow card) 57'; Dieng (yellow card) 58' (yellow-red card) 71'; Gorobsov 64' (pen.) (yellow card) 90'; Mbo 67' (yellow card) 67'	Report	Kanellopoulos (yellow card) 55'; Lyons-Foster (yellow card) 88'	Stadium: Aukštaitija Stadium; Attendance: 1,100; Referee: Luca Cibelli (Switzerland)

16 July 2024 First qualifying round 2nd leg	HJK (Finland)	1–1 (1–4 agg.)	(Lithuania) Panevėžys	Helsinki, Finland
19:00 EEST (UTC+3)	Hostikka (yellow card) 9'; Halme (yellow card) 15'; Erwin 17'; Keskinen (yellow card) 76'	Report	Veliulis 45'; Rasimavičius (yellow card) 64'	Stadium: Bolt Arena; Attendance: 5,292; Referee: Andrew Madley (England)

=== UEFA Conference League ===
==== Qualifying rounds ====
8 August 2024 Third qualifying round 1st leg	HJK (Finland)	1–0	(Montenegro) Dečić	Helsinki, Finland
20:30 EEST (UTC+3)	Erwin 49'; Lingman (yellow card) 79'; Kanellopoulos (yellow card) 81'; Tanaka (yellow card) 84'	Report	Kajević (yellow card) 31'; Chagas (yellow card) 65'; Stijepović (yellow card) 66'; Tomašević (yellow card) 67'; Božović (yellow card) 87'	Stadium: Bolt Arena; Attendance: 4,238; Referee: Sandi Putros (Denmark)

15 August 2024 Third qualifying round 2nd leg	Dečić (Montenegro)	2–1 (a.e.t.) (2–2 agg.) (3–4 p)	(Finland) HJK	Podgorica, Montenegro
22:00 EEST (UTC+3)	Puleio 26'; S.Milić (yellow card) 40'; Sekulovic (yellow card) 54'; Chagas (yellow card) 81'; Camaj (yellow card) 88'; Mašović 90+4' (yellow card) 90+6'; Stijepović (yellow card) 114'	Report	Plange 43'; Palumets (yellow card) 90'; Lyons-Foster (yellow card) 105'; Erwin (yellow card) 112'; Meriluoto (yellow card) 120'	Stadium: Podgorica City Stadium; Attendance: 1,017; Referee: Adam Ladebäck (Sweden)
	Penalties
	Božović (penalty scored); Chagas (penalty scored); Stijepović (penalty missed); Mašović (penalty scored); Camaj (penalty missed); Drešaj (penalty missed)		(penalty missed) Lingman; (penalty scored) Erwin; (penalty missed) Meriluoto; (penalty scored) Tomas; (penalty scored) Möller; (penalty scored) Palumets
Note: Dečić played their home matches at the Camp FSCG and the Podgorica City Stadium in Podgorica, instead of their regular stadium, the Stadion Tuško Polje, in Tuzi, which did not meet UEFA requirements.

22 August 2024 Playoff round 1st leg	KÍ (Faroe Islands)	2–2	(Finland) HJK	Tórshavn, Faroe Islands
21:45 EEST (UTC+3)	Joensen (yellow card) 22' (yellow-red card) 39'; Klettskarð (yellow card) 45'; Frederiksberg 55' (pen.); Hansson (yellow card) 59'; Ødemarksbakken (yellow card) 61'; Hansson 63'	Report	Erwin 15', 90+3'; Ylitolva (yellow card) 45'; Lyons-Foster (yellow card) 67'; Möller (yellow card) 75'	Stadium: Tórsvøllur; Attendance: 1,073; Referee: Lawrence Visser (Belgium)
Note: KÍ played their home matches at the Tórshavn in Tórshavn, instead of their regular stadium, the Við Djúpumýrar, in Klaksvík, which did not meet UEFA requirements.

29 August 2024 Playoff round 2nd leg	HJK (Finland)	2–1 (4–3 agg.)	(Faroe Islands) KÍ	Helsinki, Finland
19:00 EEST (UTC+3)	Palumets (yellow card) 65'; Tomas 90'; Erwin 90+3'	Report	Frederiksberg 57'; Yambéré (red card) 59'; Mikkelsen (yellow card) 90+2' da Silva (yellow card) 90+7'	Stadium: Bolt Arena; Attendance: 6,665; Referee: David Fuxman (Israel)

==== League phase ====
Pos	Team	Pld	W	D	L	GF	GA	GD	Pts
28	(Kazakhstan Football Federation) Astana	6	1	2	3	4	8	−4	5
29	(Swiss Football Association) St. Gallen	6	1	2	3	10	18	−8	5
30	(Football Association of Finland) HJK	6	1	1	4	3	9	−6	4
31	(Football Federation of Armenia) Noah	6	1	1	4	6	16	−10	4
32	(Football Association of Wales) The New Saints	6	1	0	5	5	10	−5	3

Source: UEFA
Rules for classification: League phase tiebreakers

Round	1	2	3	4	5	6
Ground	A	H	H	A	H	A
Result	L	W	L	L	D	
Position	33	23	26	31	29	

Updated to match(es) played on 12 December 2024. Source: Results
A = Away; H = Home; W = Win; D = Draw; L = Loss

3 October 2024 1	Lugano (Switzerland)	3–0	(Finland) HJK	Thun, Switzerland
22:00 EEST (UTC+3)	Hajdari (yellow card) 8'; Papadopoulos 34'; Marques 56'; Dos Santos 90+1'	Report		Stadium: Stockhorn Arena; Attendance: 932; Referee: David Dickinson (Scotland)
Note: Lugano will play their home matches at Stockhorn Arena, Thun, instead of their regular stadium, Cornaredo Stadium, Lugano, due to renovation work.

24 October 2024 2	HJK (Finland)	1–0	(Belarus) Dinamo Minsk	Helsinki, Finland
22:00 EEST (UTC+3)	Möller 46' (yellow card) 71'; Antzoulas (yellow card) 62'; Plange (penalty missed) 82'	Report	Alfred (yellow card) 25'; Polyakov (yellow card) 40'; Melnichenko (red card) 81'; Kalinin (yellow card) 90+10'	Stadium: Bolt Arena; Attendance: 4,211; Referee: Henrik Nalbandyan (Armenia)

7 November 2024 3	HJK (Finland)	0–2	(Slovenia) Olimpija Ljubljana	Helsinki, Finland
19:45 EEST (UTC+3)	Ylitolva (yellow card) 51'; Bandé (yellow card) 79'; Lyons-Foster (yellow card) 85'; Toivio (yellow card) 89'	Report	Brest (yellow card) 31' (goal) 57'; Lasickas (yellow card) 63'; Agba 68'	Stadium: Bolt Arena; Attendance: 6,394; Referee: Robert Jones (England)

28 November 2024 4	Panathinaikos (Greece)	1–0	(Finland) HJK	Athens, Greece
19:45 EET (UTC+2)	Toivio 33' (o.g.); Ioannidis (yellow card) 89'	Report	Erwin (yellow card) 85'	Stadium: Olympic Stadium; Attendance: 18,822; Referee: Donatas Rumšas (Lithuania)

12 December 2024 5	HJK (Finland)	2–2	(Norway) Molde	Helsinki, Finland
19:45 EET (UTC+2)	Erwin 32'; Lyons-Foster (yellow card) 54'; Lingman (yellow card) 63'; Meriluoto 90+2'; Antzoulas (yellow card) 90+5'	Report	Enggård (yellow card) 4'; Ihler 14', 27'	Stadium: Bolt Arena; Attendance: 4,454; Referee: Atilla Karaoğlan (Turkey)

19 December 2024 6	Real Betis (Spain)	1–0	(Finland) HJK	Seville, Spain
22:00 EET (UTC+2)	Cardoso 27'; Ruibal (yellow card) 38'	Report	Hostikka (yellow card) 55'; Kanellopoulos (yellow card) 84'; Bandé (yellow card) 90+2'	Stadium: Benito Villamarín; Attendance: 35,779; Referee: Patrik Kolarić (Croatia)

== Squad statistics ==
As of match played 19 December 2024

=== Appearances and goals ===
No.	Pos	Nat	Player	Total		Veikkausliiga		Finnish Cup		League Cup		UEFA Champions League		UEFA Conference League	
No.	Pos	Nat	Player	Apps	Goals	Apps	Goals	Apps	Goals	Apps	Goals	Apps	Goals	Apps	Goals
1	GK	(Finland) FIN	Jesse Öst	20	0	18	0	0	0	1	0	1	0	0	0
2	DF	(England) ENG	Brooklyn Lyons-Foster	31	1	15+3	1	0	0	0+1	0	1+1	0	3+7	0
3	DF	(Greece) GRE	Georgios Antzoulas	15	0	6+1	0	0	0	0	0	0	0	7+1	0
4	DF	(Finland) FIN	Joona Toivio	28	1	15+3	1	1	0	3	0	1+1	0	3+1	0
5	DF	(Finland) FIN	Daniel O'Shaughnessy	17	0	8+1	0	0	0	0	0	0	0	8	0
6	DF	(Finland) FIN	Aapo Halme	22	2	16+1	2	0	0	0	0	1	0	4	0
7	FW	(Finland) FIN	Santeri Hostikka	28	2	10+4	2	0+1	0	3	0	2	0	8	0
8	MF	(Greece) GRE	Georgios Kanellopoulos	34	0	18+2	0	1	0	1	0	2	0	10	0
9	FW	(England) ENG	Luke Plange	36	7	12+14	6	0+1	0	0	0	1+1	0	3+4	1
10	MF	(Finland) FIN	Lucas Lingman	35	4	19+3	4	0	0	3	0	2	0	6+2	0
17	FW	(Burkina Faso) BFA	Hassane Bandé	31	3	17+4	3	1	0	0	0	1	0	3+5	0
20	FW	(Finland) FIN	Roni Hudd	2	0	1	0	0	0	0	0	0	0	0+1	0
22	MF	(Finland) FIN	Liam Möller	28	4	6+6	2	2	1	3	0	0+1	0	5+5	1
23	MF	(Azerbaijan) AZE	Ozan Kökçü	18	0	5+3	0	0	0	0	0	0	0	9+1	0
24	DF	(Finland) FIN	Michael Boamah	17	0	6+6	0	1+1	0	1	0	2	0	0	0
25	GK	(Netherlands) NED	Thijmen Nijhuis	15	0	5	0	0	0	0	0	0	0	10	0
27	DF	(Finland) FIN	Kevin Kouassivi-Benissan	23	0	13+4	0	0	0	3	0	0+1	0	0+2	0
28	DF	(Finland) FIN	Miska Ylitolva	18	0	2+4	0	0	0	0+2	0	0+1	0	8+1	0
30	DF	(Finland) FIN	Noah Pallas	39	1	21+2	1	1	0	3	0	2	0	9+1	0
37	MF	(Japan) JPN	Atomu Tanaka	17	0	0+8	0	1+1	0	1+1	0	0	0	0+5	0
42	FW	(Finland) FIN	Kai Meriluoto	14	3	4+3	2	0	0	0	0	1	0	0+6	1
54	MF	(Finland) FIN	Pyry Mentu	5	0	0	0	0+1	0	2	0	0	0	0+2	0
64	MF	(Finland) FIN	Matias Ritari	5	1	0	0	1+1	0	2	1	0	0	0+1	0
80	MF	(Estonia) EST	Kevor Palumets	18	1	8+3	1	0	0	0	0	0+2	0	1+4	0
85	GK	(Finland) FIN	Niki Mäenpää	4	0	1+1	0	1	0	0	0	1	0	0	0
94	FW	(Scotland) SCO	Lee Erwin	23	11	9+2	5	0	0	0	0	1+1	1	10	5
99	FW	(Belgium) BEL	Alessandro Albanese	10	0	4+4	0	0	0	0	0	0+1	0	0+1	0
Players from Klubi-04 who appeared:
47	DF	(Finland) FIN	Emil Leveälahti	1	0	0	0	0	0	1	0	0	0	0	0
48	FW	(Nigeria) NGR	Francis Etu	2	0	0	0	0	0	0+2	0	0	0	0	0
49	MF	(Finland) FIN	Otto Hannula	2	1	0	0	0	0	2	1	0	0	0	0
51	FW	(Finland) FIN	Kaius Hardén	2	0	0	0	0	0	1+1	0	0	0	0	0
61	DF	(Finland) FIN	Kaius Simojoki	2	0	0	0	0	0	1+1	0	0	0	0	0
62	DF	(Sweden) SWE	Nils Svensson	4	0	0+1	0	1	0	2	0	0	0	0	0
63	DF	(Finland) FIN	Eemil Toivonen	2	0	0	0	0	0	1+1	0	0	0	0	0
67	FW	(Finland) FIN	Emil Ingman	2	0	0	0	0	0	1+1	0	0	0	0	0
74	MF	(Finland) FIN	Marlo Hyvönen	1	0	0	0	0	0	0+1	0	0	0	0	0
78	GK	(Finland) FIN	Alex Ramula	2	0	0	0	0	0	2	0	0	0	0	0
87	FW	(Finland) FIN	Elmer Vauhkonen	2	1	0	0	0	0	1+1	1	0	0	0	0
91	DF	(Finland) FIN	Ville Vuorinen	3	1	0	0	0+1	0	2	1	0	0	0	0
96	DF	(Finland) FIN	William Grönblom	2	0	0	0	0	0	1+1	0	0	0	0	0
Players away from the club on loan:
11	FW	(Finland) FIN	Anthony Olusanya	20	5	11+5	2	1	0	3	3	0	0	0	0
16	MF	(Finland) FIN	Aaro Toivonen	7	0	1+4	0	1	0	1	0	0	0	0	0
19	FW	(Finland) FIN	David Ezeh	13	3	2+8	1	1	2	0+2	0	0	0	0	0
81	GK	(Finland) FIN	Elmo Henriksson	7	0	3+1	0	1	0	2	0	0	0	0	0
95	FW	(Finland) FIN	Stanislav Baranov	4	3	0+1	1	1	2	1+1	0	0	0	0	0
Players who left HJK during the season:
5	DF	(Spain) ESP	Carlos Moros	7	0	2+3	0	0	0	2	0	0	0	0	0
14	MF	(Ghana) GHA	Hans Nunoo Sarpei	17	0	10+4	0	0	0	1+2	0	0	0	0	0
15	DF	(Estonia) EST	Andreas Vaher	2	0	0	0	0	0	1+1	0	0	0	0	0
18	FW	(Finland) FIN	Topi Keskinen	23	7	16+1	6	0+1	0	3	1	2	0	0	0
20	MF	(Finland) FIN	Johannes Yli-Kokko	6	0	0+4	0	2	0	0	0	0	0	0	0
41	FW	(Finland) FIN	Samuel Anini Junior	3	0	0+1	0	1	0	0+1	0	0	0	0	0
43	DF	(Finland) FIN	Santeri Silander	2	0	0	0	0	0	1+1	0	0	0	0	0
45	DF	(Finland) FIN	Diogo Tomas	24	3	14+3	2	2	0	0	0	1	0	3+1	1
46	DF	(Finland) FIN	Oliver Pettersson	1	0	0	0	1	0	0	0	0	0	0	0
75	MF	(Finland) FIN	Altti Hellemaa	2	0	0	0	0	0	0+2	0	0	0	0	0

=== Goal scorers ===
Place	Position	Nation	Number	Name	Veikkausliiga	Finnish Cup	League Cup	UEFA Champions League	UEFA Conference League	Total
1	FW	(Scotland)	94	Lee Erwin	5	0	0	1	5	11
2	FW	(Finland)	18	Topi Keskinen	6	0	1	0	0	7
2	FW	(England)	9	Luke Plange	6	0	0	0	1	7
4	FW	(Finland)	11	Anthony Olusanya	2	0	3	0	0	5
5	MF	(Finland)	10	Lucas Lingman	4	0	0	0	0	4
5	MF	(Finland)	22	Liam Möller	2	1	0	0	1	4
7	FW	(Burkina Faso)	17	Hassane Bandé	3	0	0	0	0	3
7	DF	(Finland)	45	Diogo Tomas	2	0	0	0	1	3
7	FW	(Finland)	42	Kai Meriluoto	2	0	0	0	1	3
7	FW	(Finland)	19	David Ezeh	1	2	0	0	0	3
7	FW	(Finland)	95	Stanislav Baranov	1	2	0	0	0	3
7				Own goal	2	0	1	0	0	3
13	MF	(Finland)	7	Santeri Hostikka	2	0	0	0	0	2
13	DF	(Finland)	6	Aapo Halme	2	0	0	0	0	2
15	DF	(Finland)	4	Joona Toivio	1	0	0	0	0	1
15	DF	(England)	2	Brooklyn Lyons-Foster	1	0	0	0	0	1
15	DF	(Finland)	30	Noah Pallas	1	0	0	0	0	1
15	MF	(Estonia)	80	Kevor Palumets	1	0	0	0	0	1
15	FW	(Finland)	91	Ville Vuorinen	0	0	1	0	0	1
15	MF	(Finland)	49	Otto Hannula	0	0	1	0	0	1
15	FW	(Finland)	87	Elmer Vauhkonen	0	0	1	0	0	1
15	MF	(Finland)	64	Matias Ritari	0	0	1	0	0	1
TOTALS					44	5	8	1	7	65

=== Clean sheets ===
Place	Position	Nation	Number	Name	Veikkausliiga	Finnish Cup	League Cup	UEFA Champions League	UEFA Conference League	Total
1	GK	(Finland)	1	Jesse Öst	8	0	1	0	0	9
2	GK	(Finland)	85	Niki Mäenpää	1	1	0	0	0	2
2	GK	(Netherlands)	25	Thijmen Nijhuis	0	0	0	0	2	2
4	GK	(Finland)	81	Elmo Henriksson	1	0	0	0	0	1
TOTALS					8	1	1	1	2	12

Jesse Öst & Niki Mäenpää both played in HJK's 1-0 victory over Inter Turku on 25 August 2024

=== Disciplinary record ===
Number	Nation	Position	Name	Veikkausliiga		Finnish Cup		League Cup		UEFA Champions League		UEFA Conference League		Total	
Number	Nation	Position	Name	Booked	Sent off (straight red)	Booked	Sent off (straight red)	Booked	Sent off (straight red)	Booked	Sent off (straight red)	Booked	Sent off (straight red)	Booked	Sent off (straight red)
2	(England)	DF	Brooklyn Lyons-Foster	4	0	0	0	0	0	1	0	4	0	9	0
3	(Greece)	DF	Georgios Antzoulas	1	0	0	0	0	0	0	0	2	0	3	0
4	(Finland)	DF	Joona Toivio	0	0	0	0	0	0	0	0	1	0	1	0
6	(Finland)	DF	Aapo Halme	5	0	0	0	0	0	1	0	0	0	6	0
7	(Finland)	FW	Santeri Hostikka	1	0	0	0	1	0	1	0	1	0	4	0
8	(Greece)	MF	Georgios Kanellopoulos	8	0	1	0	0	0	1	0	2	0	12	0
9	(England)	FW	Luke Plange	1	0	1	0	0	0	0	0	0	0	2	0
10	(Finland)	MF	Lucas Lingman	5	0	0	0	0	0	0	0	2	0	7	0
17	(Burkina Faso)	FW	Hassane Bande	2	0	0	0	0	0	0	0	2	0	4	0
22	(Finland)	MF	Liam Möller	2	0	0	0	0	0	0	0	2	0	4	0
23	(Azerbaijan)	MF	Ozan Kökçü	1	0	0	0	0	0	0	0	0	0	1	0
25	(Netherlands)	GK	Thijmen Nijhuis	1	0	0	0	0	0	0	0	0	0	1	0
27	(Finland)	DF	Kevin Kouassivi-Benissan	1	0	0	0	0	0	0	0	0	0	1	0
28	(Finland)	DF	Miska Ylitolva	0	0	0	0	0	0	0	0	2	0	2	0
30	(Finland)	MF	Noah Pallas	4	0	0	0	1	0	0	0	0	0	5	0
37	(Japan)	MF	Atomu Tanaka	1	0	0	0	0	0	0	0	1	0	2	0
42	(Finland)	FW	Kai Meriluoto	0	0	0	0	0	0	0	0	1	0	1	0
48	(Nigeria)	FW	Francis Etu	0	0	0	0	1	0	0	0	0	0	1	0
61	(Finland)	DF	Kaius Simojoki	0	0	0	0	1	0	0	0	0	0	1	0
64	(Finland)	MF	Matias Ritari	0	0	1	0	0	0	0	0	0	0	1	0
79	(Finland)	GK	Alex Ramula	0	0	0	0	1	0	0	0	0	0	1	0
80	(Estonia)	MF	Kevor Palumets	1	0	0	0	0	0	0	0	2	0	3	0
94	(Scotland)	FW	Lee Erwin	1	0	0	0	0	0	0	0	2	0	3	0
Players from Klubi-04:
Players away on loan:
11	(Finland)	FW	Anthony Olusanya	3	0	0	0	1	0	0	0	0	0	4	0
Players who left HJK during the season:
5	(Spain)	DF	Carlos Moros	0	0	0	0	1	1	0	0	0	0	1	1
14	(Ghana)	MF	Hans Nunoo Sarpei	2	0	1	0	0	0	0	0	0	0	3	0
15	(Estonia)	DF	Andreas Vaher	0	0	0	0	1	0	0	0	0	0	1	0
18	(Finland)	MF	Topi Keskinen	3	0	0	0	0	0	1	0	0	0	4	0
20	(Finland)	MF	Johannes Yli-Kokko	0	0	1	0	0	0	0	0	0	0	1	0
45	(Finland)	DF	Diogo Tomas	3	1	2	0	0	0	0	0	0	0	5	1
TOTALS				48	1	0	0	9	1	3	0	24	0	84	2
