= List of Estonian football transfers summer 2024 =

This is a list of Estonian football transfers in the 2024 summer transfer window by club.

This transfer window was open during the 2024 Meistriliiga season.

== Meistriliiga ==
=== Flora ===
In:

No.	Pos.	Nation	Player
3	DF	EST	Andreas Vaher (from (Finland) HJK)
11	FW	EST	Rauno Sappinen (from (Israel) Hapoel Jerusalem)

Out:

No.	Pos.	Nation	Player
2	DF	EST	Stevin Kerge
3	DF	EST	Marko Lipp
21	FW	EST	Tristan Pajo (loan to Pärnu Vaprus)
43	DF	EST	Markkus Seppik (loan to Pärnu Vaprus)

=== FCI Levadia ===
In:

No.	Pos.	Nation	Player
8	DF	GUI	Mousta Bah (from (Spain) Girona U19)

Out:

No.	Pos.	Nation	Player
9	FW	BRA	Felipe Felicio (loan return to (Brazil) Atlético Mineiro)
29	MF	EST	Nikita Vassiljev (loan to (Slovakia) ŠTK 1914 Šamorín)

=== Tallinna Kalev ===
In:

No.	Pos.	Nation	Player
5	MF	FIN	Stanislav Baranov (loan from (Finland) HJK Helsinki)
2	FW	EST	Romet Nigula (from Vaprus)
23	DF	EST	Taijo Teniste (from Welco)
9	MF	FIN	Aaro Toivonen (loan from (Finland) HJK Helsinki)
55	MF	EST	Jevgeni Tšernjakov (loan from Levadia U21)

Out:

No.	Pos.	Nation	Player
9	FW	FIN	Onni Suutari (loan return to (Finland) AC Oulu)

=== Paide Linnameeskond ===
In:

No.	Pos.	Nation	Player
—	FW	GAM	Abdoulie Ceesay (from (The Gambia) Real de Banjul)
—	DF	SRB	Milan Delević (from (Serbia) IMT)
—	FW	SEN	Mechini Gomis (loan return from (Qatar) Lusail)
—	MF	SEN	Mouhamed Guèye (from (Senegal) Diambars)
—	DF	EST	Michael Lilander (from (Republic of Ireland) Bohemians)
—	FW	GAM	Muhammed Suso (from (The Gambia) Real de Banjul)

Out:

No.	Pos.	Nation	Player
11	FW	CMR	Ngu Abega Enyang (to (North Macedonia) Rabotnički)
42	MF	EST	Silver Alex Kelder (loan to Pärnu Vaprus)
33	MF	EST	Karl Mööl (end of career)
24	DF	NED	Dehninio Muringen (end of contract)
12	DF	GHA	Abdul Yusif (to (Serbia) Železničar)

=== Nõmme Kalju ===
In:

No.	Pos.	Nation	Player
47	DF	FRA	Marlone Foubert (from (Spain) Ciudad Real)
—	FW	EST	Peeter Klein (from Tabasalu)
29	MF	LAT	Ivans Patrikejevs (loan from (Latvia) Liepāja)
9	FW	BRA	Lucas Serravalle (loan from (Brazil) Grêmio Esportivo Juventus)
87	FW	BRA	Guilherme Smith (from (Ukraine) Zorya Luhansk)

Out:

No.	Pos.	Nation	Player
9	FW	CAN	Promise David (to (Belgium) Union SG)
5	DF	FRA	Yohan Mannone (to (Luxembourg) Wiltz)
46	DF	CRO	Roko Vukušić (loan return to (Italy) Modena)

=== Vaprus ===
In:

No.	Pos.	Nation	Player
8	MF	EST	Silver Alex Kelder (loan from Paide Linnameeskond)
28	FW	EST	Tristan Pajo (loan from Flora)
—	DF	EST	Markkus Seppik (loan from Flora)

Out:

No.	Pos.	Nation	Player
42	MF	EST	Matthias Limberg (end of career)

=== Kuressaare ===
In:

No.	Pos.	Nation	Player
—	DF	EST	Marko Lipp (from Flora)

Out:

No.	Pos.	Nation	Player

=== Narva Trans ===
In:

No.	Pos.	Nation	Player
—	DF	BRA	Eriks Santos (from (Malta) Għajnsielem)

Out:

No.	Pos.	Nation	Player

=== Tammeka ===
In:

No.	Pos.	Nation	Player

Out:

No.	Pos.	Nation	Player
30	DF	ITA	Eugenio Bracelli (to (Romania) Ceahlăul)
7	MF	EST	Dominic Laaneots (loan to Elva)
18	FW	EST	Devid Lehter (to Elva)

=== Nõmme United ===
In:

No.	Pos.	Nation	Player
24	MF	SVK	Martin Adamec (from (Slovakia) Komárno)
43	FW	GAM	Ousman Ceesay (from (The Gambia) Falcons FC)
14	DF	FRA	Sacha Martinez (from (France) US Ivry)
16	FW	ITA	Facundo Stefanazzi (from (Italy) San Cataldo)

Out:

No.	Pos.	Nation	Player
15	MF	EST	Trevor Hint (to (Germany) Wolfsburg U17)
