= Oliver Pettersson =

Finnish footballer (born 2003)

Personal information
- Date of birth: 13 May 2003 (age 23)
- Place of birth: Espoo, Finland
- Height: 1.89 m (6 ft 2 in)
- Position: Centre back

Team information
- Current team: Ilves
- Number: 4

Youth career
- –2018: Honka
- 2019–2020: EPS

Senior career*
Years	Team	Apps	(Gls)
2020	EPS	11	(1)
2021–2022	Ekenäs IF	36	(1)
2022–2023	Klubi 04	12	(0)
2023–2024	HJK	3	(0)
2024–2025	Gnistan	33	(3)
2026–	Ilves	22	(2)

International career^{‡}
2021–2022	Finland U19	6	(0)
2021	Finland U20	1	(0)
2023	Finland U21	3	(0)
Medal record
HJK
First place	Veikkausliiga	2023
First place	Finnish League Cup	2023
- * Club domestic league appearances and goals as of 13 November 2026 ‡ National team caps and goals as of 16 November 2023

Oliver Pettersson (born 13 May 2003) is a Finnish professional footballer who plays as a centre back for Veikkausliiga club Ilves.

== Early years ==
Born in Espoo, Pettersson played in youth sectors of local clubs Honka and Espoon Palloseura (EPS). He made his senior debut with EPS first team in 2020, playing in third-tier level Kakkonen.

== Career ==
During 2021 and 2022, Pettersson played for Ekenäs IF (EIF) in second-tier Ykkönen.

On 12 August 2022, Pettersson signed with HJK Helsinki on a deal until the end of 2023, with an option for extension, for an undisclosed fee, and was first assigned to their reserve team Klubi 04. On 27 January 2023, Pettersson made his HJK debut in Finnish League Cup match against IFK Mariehamn. He played in three Veikkausliiga matches in 2023 season, before he suffered an injury and was ruled out for the rest of the season. On 28 September 2023, HJK exercised their option to extend Pettersson's contract until the end of 2024. However, he suffered from an injury again and missed the start of the 2024 season.

On 9 July 2024, his deal with HJK was terminated on mutual consent and Pettersson signed with fellow Veikkausliiga club Gnistan until the end of 2025.

On 1 January 2026, Pettersson signed with Veikkausliiga club Ilves on two-year deal with a one-year option.

== International career ==
Pettersson has represented Finland at youth international levels.

== Career statistics ==
As of 24 March 2026

Club	Season	League			National cup (Note: Includes Finnish Cup)		League cup (Note: Includes Ykkönen Cup and Finnish League Cup)		Europe		Total	
Club	Season	Division	Apps	Goals	Apps	Goals	Apps	Goals	Apps	Goals	Apps	Goals
EPS	2020	Kakkonen	11	1	0	0	–		–		11	1
Ekenäs IF	2021	Ykkönen	20	1	4	0	–		–		25	1
Ekenäs IF	2022	Ykkönen	16	0	3	0	5	0	–		24	0
Ekenäs IF	Total		36	1	7	0	5	0	–	–	48	1
Klubi 04	2022	Kakkonen	11	0	0	0	–		–		11	0
Klubi 04	2023	Kakkonen	1	0	0	0	–		–		1	0
Klubi 04	Total		12	0	0	0	–	–	–	–	12	0
HJK	2023	Veikkausliiga	3	0	0	0	5	0	0	0	8	0
HJK	2024	Veikkausliiga	0	0	1	0	0	0	0	0	1	0
HJK	Total		3	0	1	0	5	0	–	–	9	0
Gnistan	2024	Veikkausliiga	9	0	–		–		–		9	0
Gnistan	2025	Veikkausliiga	24	3	0	0	0	0	–		24	3
Gnistan	Total		33	3	0	0	0	0	0	0	33	3
Ilves	2026	Veikkausliiga	0	0	0	0	5	1	0	0	5	1
Career total			95	5	8	0	15	1	0	0	118	6

== Honours ==
HJK

- Veikkausliiga: 2023
- Finnish League Cup: 2023
