= Miska Ylitolva =

Finnish footballer (born 2004)

Personal information
- Date of birth: 23 May 2004 (age 22)
- Place of birth: Espoo, Finland
- Height: 1.78 m (5 ft 10 in)
- Position: Right-back

Team information
- Current team: Kalmar (on loan from HJK)

Youth career
- FC Santa Claus
- RoPS

Senior career*
Years	Team	Apps	(Gls)
2020–2021	RoPS II	23	(2)
2021	RoPS	17	(0)
2022–2023	Klubi 04	9	(0)
2022–	HJK	58	(1)
2023	→ KTP (loan)	11	(0)
2026–	→ Kalmar (loan)	0	(0)

International career^{‡}
2019	Finland U16	6	(0)
2021	Finland U18	1	(0)
2022	Finland U19	1	(0)
2023–	Finland U21	25	(2)
2022–	Finland	2	(0)
- * Club domestic league appearances and goals as of 24 July 2026 ‡ National team caps and goals as of 31 March 2026

Miska Ylitolva (born 23 May 2004) is a Finnish professional footballer who plays as a right-back for Allsvenskan club Kalmar, on loan from Veikkausliiga club HJK.

== Club career ==
=== RoPS ===
Ylitolva was born in Espoo, but soon after his family moved to Rovaniemi, Lapland. He began playing football at age 10 for Rovaniemi side FC Santa Claus. Later he joined another local club Rovaniemen Palloseura (RoPS) where he made his senior debut in 2020 at the age of 16, playing for their reserve team in third tier Kakkonen. In 2021 he was promoted to the RoPS first team playing in second tier Ykkönen.

=== HJK ===
In January 2022 Ylitolva signed a two-year contract with Veikkausliiga side HJK. He made his Veikkausliiga debut on 2 April 2022 against Honka. Ylitolva suffered an injury in that match and was ruled out almost for the whole season.

On 9 May 2022, Ylitolva signed an updated contract until the end of 2024 season.

On 17 July 2023, Ylitolva was sent on loan to a fellow Veikkausliiga club Kotkan Työväen Palloilijat (KTP) for the rest of the season. After his loan deal expired, he returned to HJK.

On 29 August 2024, he signed a two-year contract extension with HJK. On 8 January 2025, Ylitolva scored his first goals for HJK, by a brace in a 3–1 win against Haka in Finnish League Cup, providing also the assist to the third goal.

On 31 August 2026, he extended his contract with HJK and was loaned to Kalmar.

== International career ==
Ylitolva made his international debut on senior level for Finland on 26 March 2022 in a friendly match against Iceland. He has also played for Finland at various youth national team levels.

== Career statistics ==
=== Club ===
As of 6 June 2025

Appearances and goals by club, season and competition
Club	Season	League			Cup		League cup		Europe		Total	
Club	Season	Division	Apps	Goals	Apps	Goals	Apps	Goals	Apps	Goals	Apps	Goals
RoPS II	2020	Kakkonen	9	0	0	0	—		—		9	0
RoPS II	2021	Kakkonen	14	2	0	0	—		—		14	2
RoPS II	Total		23	2	0	0	0	0	0	0	23	2
RoPS	2021	Ykkönen	17	0	3	0	—		—		20	0
Klubi 04	2022	Kakkonen	6	0	—		—		—		6	0
Klubi 04	2023	Kakkonen	3	0	—		—		—		3	0
Klubi 04	Total		9	0	0	0	0	0	0	0	9	0
HJK	2022	Veikkausliiga	4	0	0	0	3	0	0	0	7	0
HJK	2023	Veikkausliiga	4	0	1	0	0	0	0	0	5	0
HJK	2024	Veikkausliiga	6	0	0	0	2	0	10 (Note: Appearance(s) in UEFA Champions League and UEFA Conference League)	0	18	0
HJK	2025	Veikkausliiga	27	0	2	0	5	2	4 (Note: Appearances in UEFA Conference League)	0	14	2
HJK	2026	Veikkausliiga	17	1	3	0	6	0	2	0	28	1
HJK	Total		58	1	6	0	16	2	16	0	96	3
KTP (loan)	2023	Veikkausliiga	11	0	—		—		—		11	0
Kalmar FF (loan)	2026	Allsvenskan	0	0	0	0	—		—		0	0
Career total			118	3	9	0	16	2	16	0	159	5

=== International ===
As of 16 July 2024

Finland
Year	Apps	Goals
2022	2	0
Total	2	0

== Honours ==
HJK

- Veikkausliiga: 2023
- Finnish Cup: 2025
