= Roni Hudd =

Finnish footballer (born 2005)

Personal information
- Date of birth: 20 January 2005 (age 21)
- Place of birth: Vaasa, Finland
- Height: 1.74 m (5 ft 9 in)
- Positions: Attacking midfielder; striker

Team information
- Current team: HJK
- Number: 91

Youth career
- –2022: VPS

Senior career*
Years	Team	Apps	(Gls)
2020–2024	VPS II	27	(15)
2022–2024	VPS	50	(6)
2024–	HJK	6	(0)
2024–	Klubi 04	23	(3)
2025	→ Haka (loan)	9	(1)

International career^{‡}
2019	Finland U15	2	(0)
2021–2022	Finland U17	6	(1)
2022–	Finland U18	9	(2)
2023–	Finland U19	3	(0)
2023–	Finland U21	2	(1)
Medal record
VPS
Third place	Veikkausliiga	2023
Finland U18
First place	Baltic Cup	2023
- * Club domestic league appearances and goals as of 12 November 2026 ‡ National team caps and goals as of 16 November 2023

Roni Hudd (born 20 January 2005) is a Finnish professional footballer who plays as an attacking midfielder for Veikkausliiga club HJK Helsinki, and the Finland under-21 national team.

== Club career ==
=== VPS ===
Hudd started playing football in his hometown club Vaasan Palloseura (VPS) youth sector in Vaasa. He was promoted to train with the first team at the age of 15 in 2020, when VPS played in Ykkönen, the second tier in Finland. In 2020, Hudd also made his senior debut with VPS reserve team in the fourth-tier league Kolmonen. After the season, Hudd signed a professional contract with the club.

Hudd scored his first goal in his debut in the premier division Veikkausliiga on 18 June 2022, in a 5–1 away victory against HIFK.

On 25 April 2023, Hudd extended his contract with VPS until the end of 2024. In the end of the 2023 season, Hudd won the bronze medal with VPS, as the club finished in 3rd place in the league.

Early in the 2024 pre-season, Hudd suffered an injury which kept him out of the line-up until July.

=== HJK ===
On 27 August 2024, HJK Helsinki announced the signing of Hudd on a deal until the end of the 2026 season with a one-year option, for an undisclosed fee.

On 9 July 2025, he was loaned out to Haka.

== International career ==
Hudd is a regular in the youth national teams of Finland.

In September 2021, Hudd was named in the Finland U17 squad for the 2022 UEFA European Under-17 Championship qualification tournament, against Bosnia-Herzegovina, Switzerland and Gibraltar, scoring one goal and providing an assist in three games. Finland finished 2nd in the group and advanced to the Elite round.

Hudd was part of the Finland U18 squad winning the friendly tournament Baltic Cup in June 2023, scoring one goal in three games.

On 24 August 2023, Hudd got his first call-up to Finland under-21 national team, for a friendly match against Iceland. On 7 September 2023, he debuted in that game as a substitute, and scored a goal, as Finland were defeated 2–3 by Iceland.

In October 2023, Hudd was the captain of the Finland U19 squad in the 2024 UEFA European Under-19 Championship qualification tournament, and played in all three games, against Romania, Czech Republic and San Marino.

== Personal life ==
Hudd comes from a sporting family: his older sister Emma plays pesäpallo, Finnish baseball, for Lapuan Virkiä. His father Nicklas is an ice hockey coach in Norway, and his mother played volleyball at youth national team level and in national level in Finland.

In January 2023, Hudd's profile in Transfermarkt was momentarily among the most popular profiles in the website.

== Career statistics ==
As of 9 July 2025

Appearances and goals by club, season and competition
Club	Season	League			National cup		League cup		Europe		Total	
Club	Season	Division	Apps	Goals	Apps	Goals	Apps	Goals	Apps	Goals	Apps	Goals
VPS Akatemia	2020	Kolmonen	6	1	—		—		—		6	1
VPS Akatemia	2021	Kolmonen	3	0	—		—		—		3	0
VPS Akatemia	2022	Kolmonen	12	8	—		—		—		12	8
VPS Akatemia	2023	Kolmonen	0	0	—		—		—		0	0
VPS Akatemia	2024	Kolmonen	6	6	—		—		—		6	6
VPS Akatemia	Total		27	15	0	0	0	0	0	0	27	15
VPS	2022	Veikkausliiga	18	2	1	0	1	0	—		20	2
VPS	2023	Veikkausliiga	24	4	3	0	3	0	—		30	4
VPS	2024	Veikkausliiga	8	0	0	0	3	0	1 (Note: Appearance in UEFA Conference League)	0	12	0
VPS	Total		50	6	4	0	7	0	1	0	62	6
HJK	2024	Veikkausliiga	1	0	–		–		1	0	2	0
HJK	2025	Veikkausliiga	5	0	2	0	2	1	0	0	9	1
HJK	Total		6	0	2	0	2	1	1	0	11	1
Klubi 04	2024	Ykkönen	4	1	—		—		—		4	1
Klubi 04	2025	Ykkösliiga	1	0	—		—		—		1	0
Klubi 04	Total		5	1	0	0	0	0	0	0	5	1
Haka (loan)	2025	Veikkausliiga	0	0	—		—		—		0	0
Career total			88	22	6	0	9	1	2	0	105	23

== Honours ==
Vaasan Palloseura

- Ykkönen: 2021
- Veikkausliiga: 2023 3rd place
