= Noah Pallas =

Finnish footballer (born 2001)

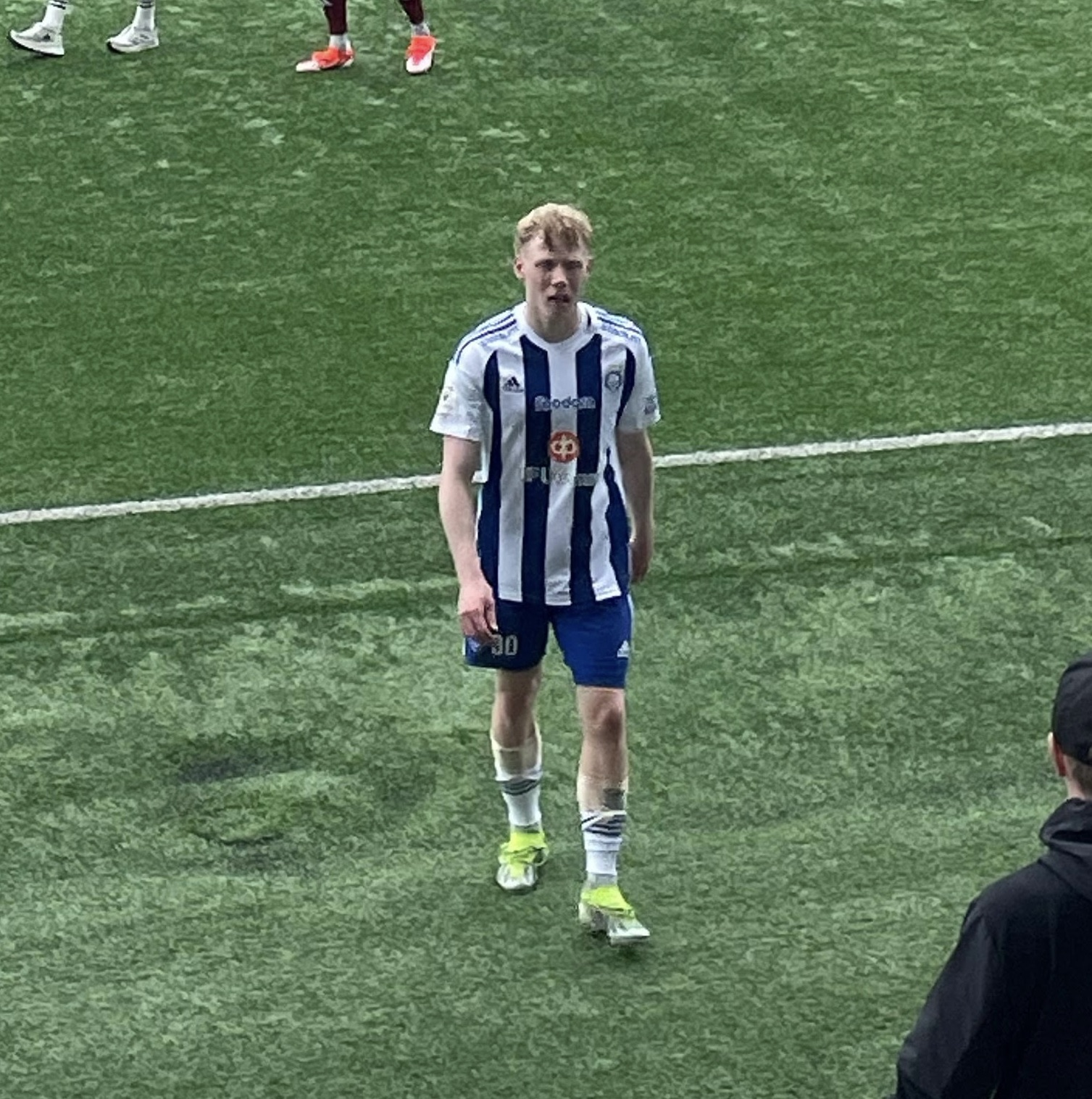
- Pallas with HJK in 2024

Personal information
- Full name: Noah Pietari Pallas
- Date of birth: 9 February 2001 (age 25)
- Place of birth: Helsinki, Finland
- Height: 1.73 m (5 ft 8 in)
- Position: Left back

Team information
- Current team: Ranheim (on loan from Vålerenga)
- Number: 5

Youth career
- Honka
- –2019: KäPa

Senior career*
Years	Team	Apps	(Gls)
2019	KäPa	15	(0)
2020–2021	Honka II	31	(2)
2022–2023	AC Oulu	51	(1)
2024	HJK	23	(1)
2025–	Vålerenga	8	(0)
2026–	→ Ranheim (loan)	27	(1)

International career^{‡}
2023	Finland	3	(0)
- * Club domestic league appearances and goals as of 14 November 2026 ‡ National team caps and goals as of 17 November 2023

Noah Pietari Pallas (born 9 February 2001) is a Finnish professional football player who plays as a left back for Norwegian First Division side Ranheim on loan from Eliteserien club Vålerenga.

== Club career ==
Pallas was born in Helsinki. In his early playing career, he played for the youth sectors of FC Honka in Espoo and Käpylän Pallo (KäPa) in Helsinki. Pallas made his senior debut with KäPa first team in the third tier Kakkonen, on 4 May 2019 against Pallo-Iirot. He played one season with KäPa in Kakkonen before moving back to FC Honka organisation to their reserve team Honka II in 2020.

=== AC Oulu ===
After playing in Kakkonen for three seasons, with Käpylän Pallo and Honka II respectively, Pallas accepted an offer from the Veikkausliiga side AC Oulu. He signed a professional contract with the club on a two-year deal starting in January 2022.

Pallas made his Veikkausliiga debut on 24 April 2022 after being named in the starting line-up in away game against IFK Mariehamn, playing full 90 minutes. He quickly made a breakthrough and established his place in the starting line-up in the league, becoming an integral part of the team. Pallas scored his first Veikkausliiga goal on 11 September 2022, in a 6–1 away win against HIFK

In the 2023 season, Pallas played more minutes than any other player in the team. After the season, it was announced that Pallas will depart from AC Oulu.

=== HJK Helsinki ===
On 20 November 2023, it was reported in Finnish media that Pallas had signed a contract with HJK, on a multiple-year deal. On 18 December 2023, HJK confirmed the signing of Pallas on a three-year deal, starting in January 2024. He debuted with his new club on 26 January 2024, in a Finnish League Cup win against IFK Mariehamn, playing full 90 minutes. On 19 June 2024, Pallas scored his first goal for HJK in Veikkausliiga, a winning goal in a 3–1 home victory over Kuopion Palloseura (KuPS). He also represented HJK in the 2024–25 UEFA Conference League league phase.

=== Vålerenga ===
On 10 January 2025, Pallas moved to Norway and signed with newly promoted Eliteserien club Vålerenga, signing a four-year deal for an undisclosed fee. Pallas made his debut for the club in Eliteserien on 30 March, in a season opening match against Viking FK, helping his side to a 3–1 home victory.

== International career ==
Pallas didn't make any appearance for Finland at any youth international levels.

He received his first call up to the Finland senior national team on 4 Jan 2023, for two friendly matches against Sweden and Estonia, as a replacement for Tuomas Ollila.

Pallas made his international debut on 12 Jan 2023 against Estonia. He made his competitive national team debut on 19 June 2023 in a 6–0 UEFA Euro 2024 qualifying win against San Marino, playing the second half as the 46th-minute substitute to Jere Uronen. On 17 November 2023, Pallas made his second appearance in the UEFA Euro 2024 qualifiers, as a 83rd-minute substitute to Nikolai Alho, in a 4–0 home win against Northern Ireland.

== Personal life ==
His twin brother Emil Pallas is also a professional football player. Their father Ben Pallas is a former footballer, who played, inter alia, in 83 games for HIFK in 1990s. Pallas speaks Swedish as his mother tongue.

Pallas is a Manchester United supporter.

== Career statistics ==
=== Club ===
As of 14 November 2026

Appearances and goals by club, season and competition
Club	Season	League			National cup (Note: Includes Suomen Cup and Norwegian Football Cup)		League cup (Note: Includes Kakkonen Cup and Finnish League Cup)		Europe		Total	
Club	Season	Division	Apps	Goals	Apps	Goals	Apps	Goals	Apps	Goals	Apps	Goals
KäPa	2019	Kakkonen	15	0	—		—		—		15	0
Honka Akatemia	2020	Kakkonen	11	1	—		3	1	—		14	2
Honka Akatemia	2021	Kakkonen	20	1	—		—		—		20	1
Honka Akatemia	Total		31	2	0	0	3	1	0	0	34	3
AC Oulu	2022	Veikkausliiga	23	1	4	0	2	1	—		29	2
AC Oulu	2023	Veikkausliiga	28	0	4	0	7	0	—		39	0
AC Oulu	Total		51	1	8	0	9	1	0	0	68	2
HJK	2024	Veikkausliiga	23	1	1	0	3	0	12 (Note: Appearances in UEFA Champions League and UEFA Conference League)	0	39	1
Vålerenga	2025	Eliteserien	8	0	2	0	—		—		10	0
Vålerenga 2	2025	3. divisjon	3	0	—		—		—		3	0
Ranheim (loan)	2026	1. divisjon	27	1	2	0	–		–		29	1
Career total			158	5	13	0	15	2	12	0	198	7

=== International ===
As of match played on 17 November 2023.

National team	Year	Competitive		Friendly		Total	
National team	Year	Apps	Goals	Apps	Goals	Apps	Goals
Finland	2023	2 (Note: Appearances in the UEFA Euro 2024 qualification.)	0	1	0	3	0
Total		2	0	1	0	3	0

== Honours ==
AC Oulu

- Finnish League Cup runner-up: 2023
