= Altti Hellemaa =

Finnish footballer (born 2004)

Personal information
- Date of birth: 25 July 2004 (age 22)
- Place of birth: Finland
- Position: Midfielder

Team information
- Current team: Jaro (on loan from Elfsborg)
- Number: 13

Youth career
- TiPS
- –2021: KäPa

Senior career*
Years	Team	Apps	(Gls)
2021	KäPa	19	(0)
2022	Klubi 04	26	(3)
2022–2024	HJK	0	(0)
2023	→ SJK II (loan)	11	(0)
2023	→ KPV (loan)	9	(0)
2024	JäPS	25	(2)
2025	Trelleborg	0	(0)
2025–	Elfsborg	13	(0)
2026–	→ Jaro (loan)	3	(0)

International career^{‡}
2019	Finland U16	5	(1)
2021	Finland U18	6	(0)
2022	Finland U19	4	(0)
2026–	Finland U21	2	(0)
- * Club domestic league appearances and goals as of 13 November 2026 ‡ National team caps and goals as of 31 March 2026

Altti Hellemaa (born 25 July 2004) is a Finnish professional footballer who plays as a midfielder for Veikkausliiga club Jaro, on loan from Allsvenskan club IF Elfsborg.

== Club career ==
After playing in the youth sectors of Tikkurilan Palloseura and Käpylän Pallo, Hellemaa made his senior debut with KäPa first team in the 2021 season in the third-tier Kakkonen.

Hellemaa joined HJK Helsinki organisation in 2022, and was registered to their academy team Klubi 04. On 6 March 2023, he extended his deal with HJK until the end of 2025, and was loaned out to second-tier Ykkönen club SJK Akatemia. On 12 August 2023, Hellemaa was loaned out to fellow Ykkönen club KPV Kokkola for the remainder of the season.

On 27 February 2024, he made his debut for HJK in a Finnish League Cup match against FC Lahti. On 4 April 2024, Hellemaa was loaned out to Ykkösliiga club JäPS until the end of July. In August his deal was made permanent.

On 2 December 2024, Hellemaa signed for Superettan club Trelleborgs FF on a deal until the end of 2027. However, on 21 March 2025, he was acquired by Allsvenskan club IF Elfsborg on a five-year deal. Hellemaa played only four Svenska Cupen matches for Trelleborg prior to his departure.

== International career ==
Hellemaa has represented Finland at under-16, under-18 and under-19 youth international levels.

Hellemaa received his first call-up to the Finland U21 national team in September 2025 for UEFA Euro qualifying match against Cyprus, as a replacement for Liam Möller.

== Career statistics ==
As of 13 November 2026

Appearances and goals by club, season and competition
Club	Season	League			National cup (Note: Includes Suomen Cup and Svenska Cupen)		League cup (Note: Includes Ykköscup, Finnish League Cup and Ykkösliigacup)		Europe		Total	
Club	Season	Division	Apps	Goals	Apps	Goals	Apps	Goals	Apps	Goals	Apps	Goals
Käpylän Pallo	2021	Kakkonen	19	0	–		–		–		19	0
Klubi 04	2022	Kakkonen	26	3	3	0	–		–		29	3
SJK Akatemia (loan)	2023	Ykkönen	11	0	1	0	0	0	–		12	0
KPV (loan)	2023	Ykkönen	11	0	–		–		–		11	0
HJK	2024	Veikkausliiga	0	0	0	0	2	0	0	0	2	0
JäPS	2024	Ykkösliiga	25	2	1	0	0	0	–		26	2
Trelleborg	2025	Superettan	0	0	4	0	–		–		4	0
Elfsborg	2025	Allsvenskan	9	0	0	0	–		–		9	0
Elfsborg	2026	Allsvenskan	5	0	3	1	–		0	0	8	1
Elfsborg	Total		14	0	3	1	0	0	0	0	17	1
Jaro (loan)	2026	Veikkausliiga	3	0	–		–		–		3	0
Career total			109	5	12	1	2	0	0	0	123	6
