= Johannes Yli-Kokko =

Finnish footballer (born 2001)

Personal information
- Full name: Johannes Waltteri Yli-Kokko
- Date of birth: 24 August 2001 (age 25)
- Place of birth: Espoo, Finland
- Height: 1.76 m (5 ft 9 in)
- Position: Attacking midfielder

Team information
- Current team: Inter Turku
- Number: 8

Youth career
- Kasiysi
- –2015: Espoo
- 2015–2021: HJK

Senior career*
Years	Team	Apps	(Gls)
2019–2022	Klubi 04	30	(6)
2022–2024	HJK	21	(1)
2023	→ Dundalk (loan)	28	(3)
2024–	Inter Turku	61	(4)
2024–	Inter Turku II	1	(1)
- * Club domestic league appearances and goals as of 12 November 2026

Johannes Waltteri Yli-Kokko (born 24 August 2001) is a Finnish footballer who plays for Veikkausliiga club Inter Turku.

== Career ==
=== HJK Helsinki ===
Yli-Kokko came through the youth academy and reserve team of HJK Helsinki, Klubi 04, before making his debut for the Veikkausliiga side in the 2022 season. Yli-Kokko made 17 appearances for the Helsinki club in his first season of senior football, which included a stunning debut goal against VPS He also made appearances during HJK Helsinki's 2022–23 UEFA Champions League. Following several good performances in the league and continental competition, Yli-Kokko was rewarded with a two-year contract extension to the end of 2024.

==== 2023; Dundalk (loan) ====
In January 2023, shortly after signing his extension with HJK, it was announced that Yli-Kokko has been loaned to League of Ireland Premier Division side Dundalk until the summer. His loan was later extended until the end of 2023. On 25 October 2023, Dundalk announced that Yli-Kokko had returned to HJK three games prior to season ending due to a minor injury.

=== Inter Turku ===
On 18 July 2024, Yli-Kokko joined fellow Veikkausliiga club Inter Turku on a deal until the end of the season, with an option for two more.

== Style of play ==
Yli-Kokko is an attacking midfield player with expansive and creative style of counter-attacking transition. He is noted for being able to take play from the center of the park and push opposition players and defenders out wide allowing strikers and supporting players to move into central attacking arrears around the penalty box.

== Career statistics ==
As of 31 March 2025

Appearances and goals by club, season and competition
Club	Season	League			Cup (Note: Includes Suomen Cup and Irish FAI Cup)		League cup		Continental		Total	
Club	Season	Division	Apps	Goals	Apps	Goals	Apps	Goals	Apps	Goals	Apps	Goals
Klubi 04	2019	Kakkonen	18	4	0	0	1 (Note: Includes Kakkonen Cup)	0	—		19	4
Klubi 04	2020	Kakkonen	2	0	0	0	3	1	—		5	1
Klubi 04	2021	Ykkönen	9	2	1	0	0	0	—		10	2
Klubi 04	2022	Kakkonen	1	0	0	0	0	0	—		1	0
Klubi 04	Total		30	6	1	0	4	1	0	0	35	7
HJK	2022	Veikkausliiga	17	1	2	2	3 (Note: Includes Finnish League Cup)	1	4 (Note: Appearance(s) in the UEFA Champions League and the UEFA Europa League)	0	26	4
HJK	2023	Veikkausliiga	0	0	0	0	1	0	0	0	1	0
HJK	2024	Veikkausliiga	4	0	2	0	0	0	0	0	6	0
HJK	Total		21	1	4	2	4	1	4	0	33	4
Dundalk (loan)	2023	LOI Premier Division	28	3	3	0	—		4 (Note: Appearance(s) in the UEFA Europa Conference League)	0	35	3
Inter Turku II	2024	Kakkonen	1	1	–		–		–		1	1
Inter Turku	2024	Veikkausliiga	11	1	–		–		–		11	1
Inter Turku	2025	Veikkausliiga	0	0	0	0	7	2	–		7	2
Inter Turku	Total		11	1	0	0	7	2	0	0	18	2
Career total			91	12	8	2	16	4	8	0	121	18

== Honours ==
Inter Turku

- Finnish League Cup: 2025

HJK Helsinki

- Finnish League Cup: 2023
