= Brooklyn Lyons-Foster =

English footballer (born 2000)

Personal information
- Date of birth: 1 December 2000 (age 25)
- Place of birth: London, England
- Height: 1.83 m (6 ft 0 in)
- Position: Defender

Team information
- Current team: Derry City
- Number: 24

Youth career
- –2024: Tottenham Hotspur

Senior career*
Years	Team	Apps	(Gls)
2021–2024	Tottenham Hotspur	0	(0)
2024–2026	HJK	49	(5)
2026–	Derry City	5	(0)

International career^{‡}
2016	England U17	6	(1)
- England U18
- * Club domestic league appearances and goals as of 16:21, 9 November 2026 (UTC) ‡ National team caps and goals as of 18 February 2024

Brooklyn Lyons-Foster (born 1 December 2000) is an English professional footballer who plays as a defender for League of Ireland Premier Division club Derry City.

== Club career ==
=== Tottenham Hotspur ===
Lyons-Foster spent his youth years in Tottenham academy. He represented the club in U18 Premier League, Premier League 2 and UEFA Youth League in multiple seasons and captained the club's U21 side. He was also named twice in the matchday squad of the Tottenham first team in the 2021–22 UEFA Europa Conference League but remained an unused substitute on the bench.

=== HJK Helsinki ===
On 14 February 2024, Lyons-Foster left Tottenham and moved to Finland after signing with reigning champions HJK Helsinki on a two-year deal, with an option for one more. The clubs had agreed on a free transfer, with Tottenham securing a sell-on clause. He made his professional debut with his new club on 17 February 2024, in a Finnish League Cup loss against Inter Turku. On 24 April 2024, Lyons-Foster scored his first senior goal for HJK in Veikkausliiga, in a 3–3 away draw against SJK Seinäjoki. He represented HJK in the 2024–25 UEFA Conference League, in which the club qualified for the league phase.

On 5 December 2025, HJK announced that they had signed a new one-year contract with Lyons-Foster, with the option for the 2027 season.

=== Derry City ===
On 22 July 2026, Lyons-Foster signed for League of Ireland Premier Division club Derry City for an undisclosed fee.

== International career ==
Lyons-Foster has represented England at under-17 and under-18 youth international level.

== Personal life ==
His older brother Kodi is also a professional footballer.

== Career statistics ==
As of match played 30 October 2026

Appearances and goals by club, season and competition
Club	Season	Division	League		National cup (Note: Includes Suomen Cup)		League cup (Note: Includes Finnish League Cup)		Europe		Other		Total	
Club	Season	Division	Apps	Goals	Apps	Goals	Apps	Goals	Apps	Goals	Apps	Goals	Apps	Goals
Tottenham Hotspur U21	2017–18	—									1 (Note: Includes EFL Trophy)	0	1	0
Tottenham Hotspur U21	2018–19	—									2	0	2	0
Tottenham Hotspur U21	2019–20	—									2	0	2	0
Tottenham Hotspur U21	2020–21	—									0	0	0	0
Tottenham Hotspur U21	2021–22	—									3	1	3	1
Tottenham Hotspur U21	2022–23	—									2	0	2	0
Tottenham Hotspur U21	2023–24	—									3	0	3	0
Tottenham Hotspur U21	Total		–		–		–		–		13	1	13	1
Tottenham Hotspur	2021–22	Premier League	0	0	0	0	0	0	0	0	–		0	0
HJK Helsinki	2024	Veikkausliiga	18	1	0	0	1	0	12 (Note: Two appearances in UEFA Champions League and ten appearances in UEFA Conference League)	0	–		31	1
HJK Helsinki	2025	Veikkausliiga	19	3	3	0	6	0	4 (Note: Appearances in UEFA Conference League)	0	–		32	3
HJK Helsinki	2026	Veikkausliiga	12	1	3	0	2	0	0	0	–		17	1
HJK Helsinki	Total		49	5	6	0	9	0	16	0	–		80	5
Derry City	2026	LOI Premier Division	5	0	1	0	–		2	0	–		8	0
Career total			54	5	7	0	9	0	18	0	13	1	102	6

== Honours ==
HJK

- Finnish Cup: 2025

Derry City

- FAI Cup: 2026

Tottenham U21

- Premier League 2: 2023–24
