= Samuel Anini Junior =

Finnish footballer (born 2002)

Samuel Anini
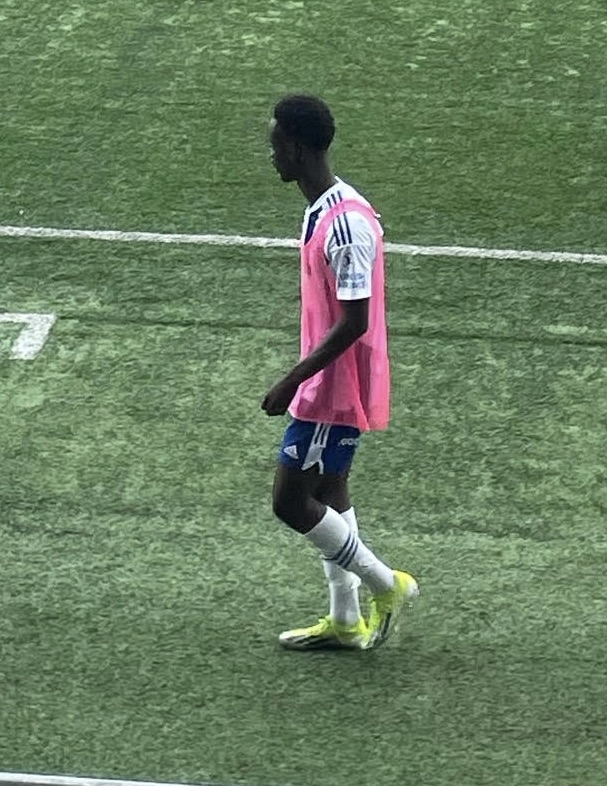
- Anini with HJK in 2024

Personal information
- Full name: Samuel Anini Junior
- Date of birth: 7 September 2002 (age 24)
- Place of birth: Vantaa, Finland
- Height: 1.75 m (5 ft 9 in)
- Position: Winger

Team information
- Current team: TPS
- Number: 41

Youth career
- Hakunilan Riento
- –2014: Kontu
- 2014–2019: PK Keski-Uusimaa
- 2019–2022: HJK

Senior career*
Years	Team	Apps	(Gls)
2019	PK Keski-Uusimaa	7	(2)
2019–2024	Klubi 04	51	(15)
2022–2024	HJK	1	(0)
2022	→ AC Oulu (loan)	15	(2)
2022	→ OLS (loan)	3	(1)
2023	→ IFK Mariehamn (loan)	17	(1)
2024	EIF	2	(0)
2025	KäPa	26	(7)
2026–	TPS	19	(2)

International career^{‡}
2018–2019	Finland U17	9	(1)
2019	Finland U18	2	(0)
2021	Finland U20	2	(0)
- * Club domestic league appearances and goals as of 13 November 2026 ‡ National team caps and goals as of 16 October 2023

Samuel Anini (born 7 September 2002) is a Finnish professional footballer who plays as a winger for Veikkausliiga club TPS.

== Club career ==
Samuel Anini Jr is a youth product of Pallokerho Keski-Uusimaa.

He transferred to HJK Helsinki in 2019 for an undisclosed fee.

He spent the 2022 season on loan with AC Oulu, which was his first season in Veikkausliiga, the premier division in Finland. He scored his first Veikkausliiga goal for AC Oulu on 23 July 2022, in a 3–1 home victory against IFK Mariehamn.

On 10 February 2023, Anini extended his contract with HJK until the end of 2024, and was immediately thereafter sent on loan to IFK Mariehamn for the 2023 season. On 23 August 2024, Anini left HJK and joined Ekenäs IF on a permanent transfer.

On 28 March 2025, Anini joined Ykkösliiga club Käpylän Pallo.

== International career ==
Anini Junior has represented Finland at under-17, under-18 and under-20 youth international levels.

== Personal life ==
Anini Junior was born and raised in Finland to Ghanaian parents, making him a dual Finnish-Ghanaian citizen.

== Career statistics ==
As of 27 July 2026

Appearances and goals by club, season and competition
Club	Season	League			Cup (Note: Includes Suomen Cup)		League cup (Note: Includes Kakkonen Cup and Finnish League Cup)		Europe		Total	
Club	Season	Division	Apps	Goals	Apps	Goals	Apps	Goals	Apps	Goals	Apps	Goals
PK Keski-Uusimaa	2019	Kolmonen	7	2	0	0	—		—		7	2
Klubi 04	2019	Kakkonen	6	2	0	0	—		—		6	2
Klubi 04	2020	Kakkonen	15	4	0	0	3	0	—		18	4
Klubi 04	2021	Ykkönen	26	9	3	1	—		—		29	10
Klubi 04	2022	Kakkonen	1	0	—		—		—		1	0
Klubi 04	2024	Ykkönen	3	0	—		—		—		3	0
Klubi 04	Total		51	15	3	1	3	0	0	0	57	16
HJK	2023	Veikkausliiga	0	0	0	0	1	0	0	0	1	0
HJK	2024	Veikkausliiga	1	0	1	0	1	0	0	0	3	0
HJK	Total		1	0	1	0	2	0	0	0	4	0
AC Oulu (loan)	2022	Veikkausliiga	15	2	3	2	0	0	—		18	4
OLS (loan)	2022	Kakkonen	3	1	—		—		—		3	1
IFK Mariehamn (loan)	2023	Veikkausliiga	17	1	5	1	2	0	—		24	2
EIF	2024	Veikkausliiga	2	0	—		—		—		2	0
KäPa	2025	Ykkösliiga	28	9	0	0	0	0	—		28	9
TPS	2026	Veikkausliiga	11	1	3	2	0	0	—		14	3
Career total			135	31	15	6	7	0	0	0	157	37
