= Nils Svensson =

Swedish footballer (born 2002)

Personal information
- Date of birth: 9 May 2002 (age 24)
- Place of birth: Mellerud, Sweden
- Position: Centre back

Team information
- Current team: Trollhättan
- Number: 5

Youth career
- Mellerud
- 2018–2022: Örgryte

Senior career*
Years	Team	Apps	(Gls)
2022	Vänersborg	28	(0)
2023–2024	Klubi 04	45	(5)
2023–2024	HJK	1	(0)
2025–	Trollhättan	57	(5)
- * Club domestic league appearances and goals as of 16 November 2026

Nils Svensson (born 9 May 2002) is a Swedish professional footballer who plays as a centre back for Trollhättan.

== Career ==
After playing in the youth sectors of Melleruds IF and Örgryte IS, Svensson debuted in senior level with Vänersborgs IF in Swedish third-tier Ettan in 2022.

On 16 February 2023, Svensson moved to Finland after signing with HJK Helsinki organisation on a two-year deal with a one-year option. He was first assigned to the club's reserve team Klubi 04 in third-tier Kakkonen. He made his Veikkausliiga debut with HJK first team on 7 June 2024, after being subbed on to injured Michael Boamah. Svensson was named the Ykkönen Defender of the Year in 2024, helping Klubi 04 to win promotion to second-tier Ykkösliiga. On 7 December, HJK announced his departure from the organisation.

== Career statistics ==
As of 23 October 2024

Appearances and goals by club, season and competition
Club	Season	League			National cup (Note: Includes Suomen Cup)		League cup (Note: Includes Finnish League Cup)		Europe		Total	
Club	Season	Division	Apps	Goals	Apps	Goals	Apps	Goals	Apps	Goals	Apps	Goals
Vänersborg	2022	Ettan	28	0	–		–		–		28	0
Klubi 04	2023	Kakkonen	18	1	–		–		–		18	1
Klubi 04	2024	Ykkönen	27	4	–		–		–		27	4
Klubi 04	Total		45	5	0	0	0	0	0	0	0	0
HJK	2023	Veikkausliiga	0	0	0	0	1	0	0	0	1	0
HJK	2024	Veikkausliiga	1	0	1	0	2	0	0	0	4	0
HJK	Total		1	0	1	0	3	0	0	0	5	0
Trollhättan	2025	Ettan	1	1	0	0	–		–		1	1
Career total			75	6	1	0	3	0	0	0	79	6

== Honours ==
HJK

- Finnish League Cup: 2023

Klubi 04

- Ykkönen: 2024

Individual

- Ykkönen Defender of the Year: 2024
