= Elmer Vauhkonen =

Finnish footballer (born 2006)

Personal information
- Date of birth: 3 January 2006 (age 20)
- Place of birth: Lapinlahti, Finland
- Height: 1.71 m (5 ft 7 in)
- Position: Left winger

Team information
- Current team: TPS
- Number: 11

Youth career
- –2019: PK-37
- 2019–2022: KuPS
- 2022–2023: HJK

Senior career*
Years	Team	Apps	(Gls)
2024	Klubi 04	18	(1)
2024	HJK	0	(0)
2025	Gnistan	6	(0)
2025	→ TPS (loan)	9	(1)
2026–	TPS	24	(0)

International career^{‡}
2022	Finland U16	1	(0)
2022	Finland U17	15	(3)
2023	Finland U18	3	(0)
2024–	Finland U19	6	(0)
- * Club domestic league appearances and goals as of 13 November 2026 ‡ National team caps and goals as of 8 April 2025

Elmer Vauhkonen (born 3 January 2006) is a Finnish professional footballer who plays as a left winger for Veikkausliiga club TPS.

== Career ==
Vauhkonen grew up in Lapinlahti, North Savo, and started football in the youth sectors of PK-37 and KuPS, before moving to Helsinki in 2022 and joining HJK Helsinki youth academy.

He played the 2024 season with Klubi 04, the reserve team of HJK, and in November 2024 Vauhkonen joined Veikkausliiga club IF Gnistan on a three-year deal.

== Honours ==
Klubi 04

- Ykkönen: 2024
