= Oliver Reitala =

Finnish football referee

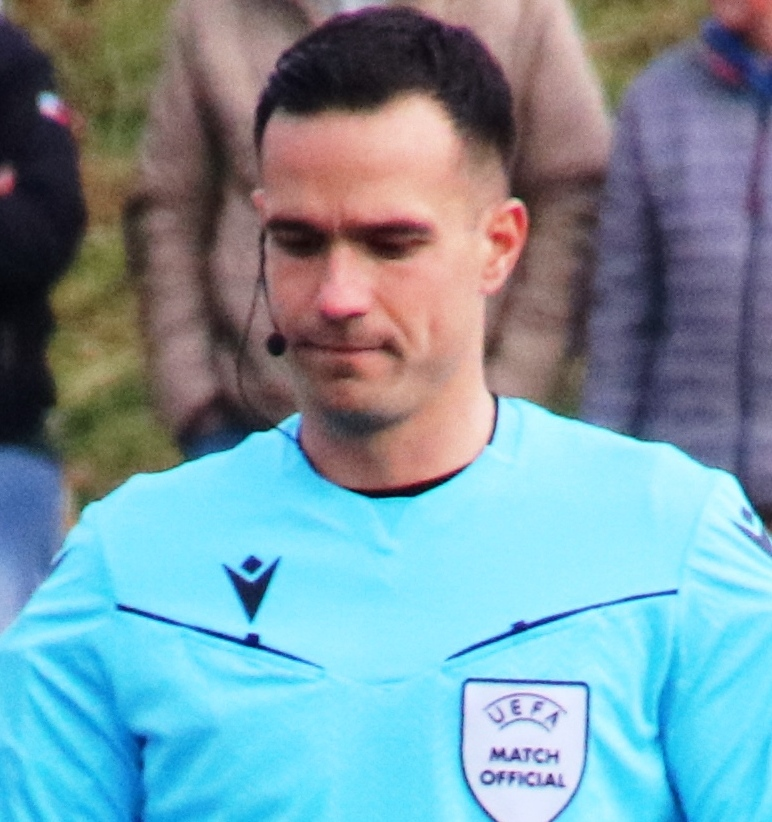
- Reitala in 2025
- Born: 22 April 1994 (age 32); Helsinki, Finland

Domestic
| Years | League | Role |
| 2014– | Kakkonen | Referee |
| 2015– | Ykkönen / Ykkösliiga | Referee |
| 2018– | Veikkausliiga | Referee |

International
| Years | League | Role |
| 2023– | FIFA listed | Referee |

Oliver Reitala (born 22 April 1994) is a Finnish football referee and a former player. Since 2023, Reitala is a FIFA-listed international referee.

He was named the Veikkausliiga Referee of the Year in 2022 and 2024.

== Career ==
=== Domestic ===
Reitala debuted in Finnish top-tier Veikkausliiga in the 2018 season.

=== International ===
In May 2023, Reitala was named a referee in the 2023 UEFA Euro U17 Championship final tournament. He was also a referee in the 2023–24 UEFA Youth League. In March 2024, Reitala was named a referee in the 2025 UEFA European Under-21 Championship qualification matches. On 3 October 2024, Reitala debuted in the UEFA Conference League league phase, as he was named the referee of a match between Astana and TSC. His second UECL league phase match took place on 12 December 2024 between The New Saints and Panathinaikos.

== Honours ==
- Veikkausliiga Referee of the Year: 2024
- Football Association of Finland Referee of the Year: 2022 and 2024
