= Carlos Moros Gracia =

Spanish footballer

Carlos Moros
Personal information
- Full name: Carlos Moros Gracia
- Date of birth: 15 April 1993 (age 33)
- Place of birth: Sagunto, Spain
- Height: 1.83 m (6 ft 0 in)
- Position: Centre back

Team information
- Current team: Atlético Saguntino

Youth career
- 1999–2012: Valencia

College career
| Years | Team | Apps | (Gls) |
| 2015–2016 | Temple Owls | 37 | (4) |

Senior career*
| Years | Team | Apps | (Gls) |
| 2012–2015 | Atlético Saguntino | 73 | (0) |
| 2017–2019 | GIF Sundsvall | 69 | (4) |
| 2020–2021 | ŁKS Łódź | 36 | (3) |
| 2021–2022 | Mjällby | 45 | (5) |
| 2023 | Djurgården | 8 | (0) |
| 2024 | HJK | 5 | (0) |
| 2024–2025 | Degerfors | 12 | (0) |
| 2025 | Omonia 29M | 11 | (0) |
| 2025– | Atlético Saguntino | 7 | (1) |
- * Club domestic league appearances and goals as of 19 October 2025

Carlos Moros Gracia (born 15 April 1993) is a Spanish professional footballer who plays as a central defender for Tercera Federación club Atlético Saguntino.

== Club career ==
Born in Sagunto, Valencian Community, Moros was a Valencia CF youth graduate. On 8 August 2012 he moved to hometown side Atlético Saguntino in Tercera División, and made his senior debut during the campaign.

In May 2015, Moros moved abroad for the first time in his career after accepting a scholarship program at the Temple University in Philadelphia. He played for the soccer team named Temple Owls, being named captain in his second season.

On 30 March 2017, Moros switched teams and countries again, after agreeing to a two-year deal with Swedish club GIF Sundsvall. He made his professional debut on 22 July, coming on as a substitute for fellow debutant David Batanero in a 2–2 away draw against Halmstads BK for the Allsvenskan championship.

On 24 January 2024, Moros Gracia joined Finnish champions HJK Helsinki.

== Career statistics ==
As of 24 January 2025

Appearances and goals by club, season and competition
| Club | Season | League | | | Cup | | League cup | | Europe | | Total | |
| Club | Season | Division | Apps | Goals | Apps | Goals | Apps | Goals | Apps | Goals | Apps | Goals |
|---|---|---|---|---|---|---|---|---|---|---|---|---|
| Atlético Saguntino | 2012–13 | Tercera División | 1 | 0 | – | | – | | – | | 1 | 0 |
| Atlético Saguntino | 2013–14 | Tercera División | 36 | 0 | – | | – | | – | | 36 | 0 |
| Atlético Saguntino | 2014–15 | Tercera División | 36 | 0 | – | | – | | – | | 36 | 0 |
| Atlético Saguntino | Total | | 73 | 0 | 0 | 0 | 0 | 0 | 0 | 0 | 73 | 0 |
| GIF Sundsvall | 2017 | Allsvenskan | 12 | 1 | 4 | 1 | – | | – | | 16 | 2 |
| GIF Sundsvall | 2018 | Allsvenskan | 29 | 1 | 0 | 0 | – | | – | | 29 | 1 |
| GIF Sundsvall | 2019 | Allsvenskan | 28 | 2 | 0 | 0 | – | | – | | 28 | 2 |
| GIF Sundsvall | Total | | 69 | 4 | 4 | 1 | 0 | 0 | 0 | 0 | 73 | 5 |
| ŁKS Łódź | 2019–20 | Ekstraklasa | 16 | 2 | 0 | 0 | – | | – | | 16 | 2 |
| ŁKS Łódź | 2020–21 | I liga | 20 | 1 | 1 | 0 | – | | – | | 21 | 1 |
| ŁKS Łódź | Total | | 36 | 3 | 1 | 0 | 0 | 0 | 0 | 0 | 37 | 1 |
| Mjällby | 2021 | Allsvenskan | 17 | 1 | 3 | 2 | – | | – | | 20 | 3 |
| Mjällby | 2022 | Allsvenskan | 28 | 4 | 0 | 0 | – | | – | | 28 | 4 |
| Mjällby | Total | | 45 | 5 | 3 | 2 | 0 | 0 | 0 | 0 | 48 | 7 |
| Djurgården | 2023 | Allsvenskan | 8 | 0 | 3 | 0 | – | | 2 (Note: Appearances in UEFA Conference League) | 0 | 13 | 0 |
| HJK Helsinki | 2024 | Veikkausliiga | 5 | 0 | 0 | 0 | 2 | 0 | 0 | 0 | 7 | 0 |
| Degerfors | 2024 | Superettan | 12 | 0 | 0 | 0 | – | | – | | 12 | 0 |
| Omonia 29M | 2024–25 | Cypriot First Division | 1 | 0 | 0 | 0 | – | | – | | 1 | 0 |
| Career total | | | 249 | 12 | 11 | 3 | 2 | 0 | 2 | 0 | 264 | 15 |
