= Ville Nevalainen =

Finnish football referee

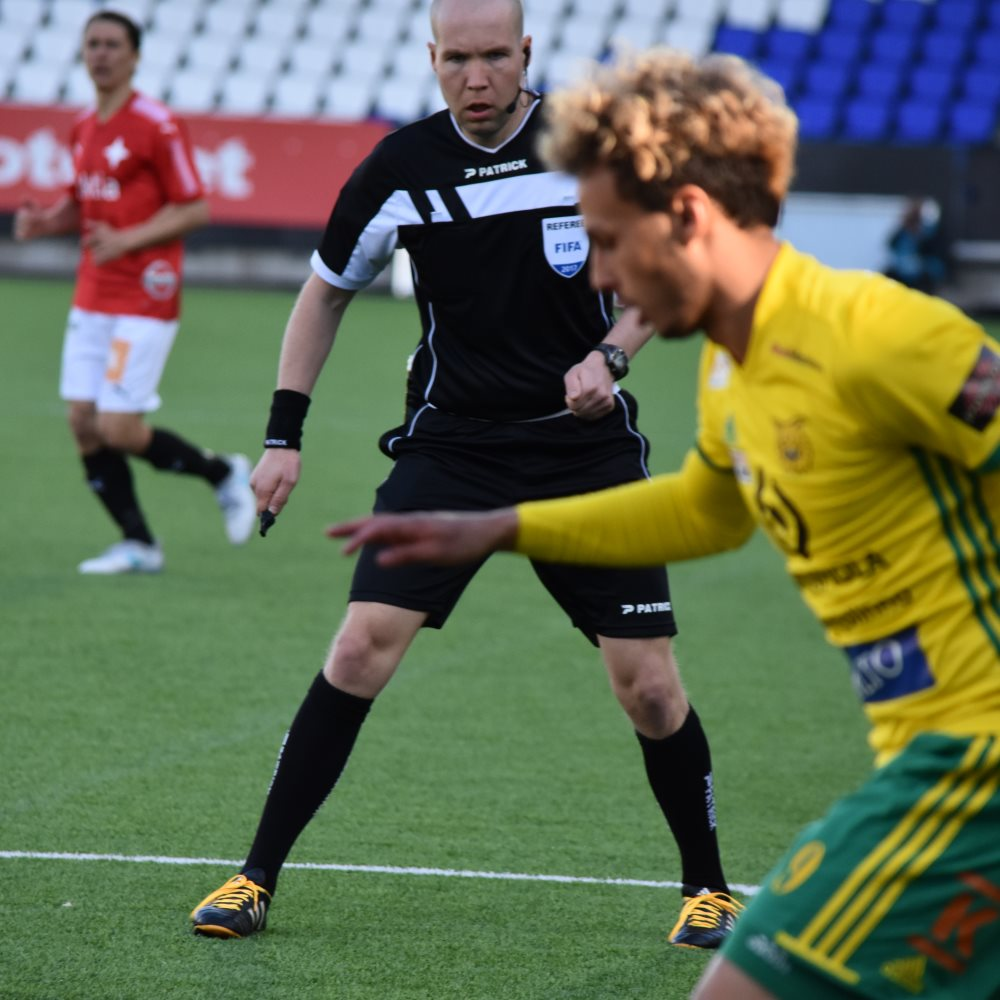
- Nevalainen in 2017
- Born: 20 October 1984 (age 42); Juuka, Finland

Domestic
Years	League	Role
2011–2024	Veikkausliiga	Referee

International
Years	League	Role
2014–2020	FIFA listed	Referee

Ville Nevalainen (born 20 October 1984) is a Finnish former football referee. He is a former FIFA-certified international referee, being listed during 2014–2020.

Nevalainen debuted in Veikkausliiga in the 2011 season. On 23 April 2023, Nevalainen refereed his 200th match in Veikkausliiga.

On 19 October 2024, Nevalainen refereed his 225th and the last Veikkausliiga match, the last match of the 2024 season between AC Oulu and IFK Mariehamn.
