= Nikolas Talo =

Finnish footballer (born 2003)

Personal information
- Date of birth: 24 March 2003 (age 23)
- Place of birth: Finland
- Position: Centre-back

Team information
- Current team: TPS
- Number: 24

Youth career
- –2019: TPS
- 2019–2023: Groningen

Senior career*
Years	Team	Apps	(Gls)
2023	KTP	5	(0)
2024–2025	Haka	31	(0)
2025	→ GIF Sundsvall (loan)	6	(0)
2026–	TPS	12	(0)

International career^{‡}
2018–2019	Finland U16	7	(0)
2019	Finland U17	5	(0)
2021–2022	Finland U19	4	(0)
2023	Finland U21	1	(0)
- * Club domestic league appearances and goals as of 13 November 2026 ‡ National team caps and goals as of 10 October 2023

Nikolas Talo (born 24 March 2003) is a Finnish professional footballer who plays as a centre-back for Veikkausliiga club Turun Palloseura (TPS).

== Club career ==
Talo played in the youth sector of Turun Palloseura (TPS), before he joined the Groningen youth academy in the Netherlands in 2019. After his contract expired with Groningen, Talo signed with Finnish club Kotkan Työväen Palloilijat (KTP) in Veikkausliiga on 19 July 2023, on a deal until the end of 2024 with an option for a further year.

KTP were relegated after the season, and Talo's contract was terminated by mutual agreement. On 18 December 2023, fellow Veikkausliiga club Haka announced the signing of Talo on a one-year deal with an option for an additional year. He debuted with his new team on 27 January 2024, in a Finnish League Cup draw against AC Oulu. On 24 October, he signed a new two-year deal with Haka.

== International career ==
Talo is a regular Finnish youth international, and has represented his country at under-16, under-17, under-19 and under-21 youth national team levels.

== Career statistics ==
As of 13 April 2026

Appearances and goals by club, season and competition
Club	Season	Division	League		National cup (Note: Includes Suomen Cup)		League cup (Note: Includes Finnish League Cup)		Europe		Total	
Club	Season	Division	Apps	Goals	Apps	Goals	Apps	Goals	Apps	Goals	Apps	Goals
KTP	2023	Veikkausliiga	5	0	0	0	–		–		5	0
Haka	2024	Veikkausliiga	25	0	5	0	5	0	–		35	0
Haka	2025	Veikkausliiga	6	0	2	0	4	0	–		12	0
Haka	Total		31	0	7	0	9	0	0	0	47	0
GIF Sundsvall (loan)	2025	Superettan	6	0	0	0	–		–		6	0
TPS	2026	Veikkausliiga	2	0	0	0	5	0	–		7	0
Career total			50	0	7	0	14	0	0	0	71	0
