= Stanislav Baranov =

Finnish footballer (born 2005)

Personal information
- Date of birth: 15 April 2005 (age 21)
- Place of birth: Helsinki, Finland
- Height: 1.88 m (6 ft 2 in)
- Position: Winger

Team information
- Current team: Ilves
- Number: 17

Youth career
- –2016: Kontu
- 2017–2022: HJK

Senior career*
Years	Team	Apps	(Gls)
2023–2026	Klubi 04	58	(20)
2023–2026	HJK	3	(1)
2024	→ Tallinna Kalev (loan)	14	(1)
2026–	Ilves	21	(2)

International career^{‡}
2023	Finland U18	3	(1)
Medal record
Finland U18
First place	Baltic Cup	2023
- * Club domestic league appearances and goals as of 13 November 2026 ‡ National team caps and goals as of 6 December 2023

Stanislav Baranov (Russian: Баранов Станислав; born 15 April 2005) is a Finnish professional footballer who plays as a winger for Veikkausliiga club Ilves.

== Early career ==
Baranov started to play football in FC Kontu in Kontula, East Helsinki at the age of 8. Before that he had also played tennis. In 2017, he joined the youth academy of HJK Helsinki, and five years later he signed his first contract with the club on 4 March 2022.

== Club career ==
Baranov made his senior debut with HJK on 22 February 2023, in a Finnish League Cup loss against Inter Turku. In the 2023 season, he played for the club's reserve team Klubi 04 in the third-tier league Kakkonen, scoring 8 goals in 23 matches. On 30 September 2023, HJK exercised their option and extended his contract until the end of 2024 season. He was also part of the HJK youth squad in the 2023–24 UEFA Youth League campaign, playing in all four games against Malmö FF and Nantes.

Baranov debuted in Veikkausliiga with HJK first team on 12 June 2024, scoring a goal in his first league match in a 4–0 away win against Gnistan. On 15 July 2024, his deal was extended until the end of 2026 with an option for 2027.

On 7 August 2024, Baranov was loaned out to Meistriliiga club Tallinna Kalev for the rest of the season.

On 6 June 2025, Baranov was named Ykkösliiga Player of the Month, after scoring five goals for Klubi 04 in the league during May.

== International career ==
Baranov was part of the Finland U18 national team squad winning the friendly tournament Baltic Cup in June 2023. He is eligible to represent Finland and Russia at international level.

== Personal life ==
Born in Finland, Baranov is of Russian descent.

== Career statistics ==
As of 21 July 2025

Appearances and goals by club, season and competition
Club	Season	League			National cup (Note: Includes Suomen Cup and Estonian Cup)		League cup (Note: Includes Finnish League Cup)		Europe		Total	
Club	Season	Division	Apps	Goals	Apps	Goals	Apps	Goals	Apps	Goals	Apps	Goals
Klubi 04	2023	Kakkonen	23	8	0	0	—		—		23	8
Klubi 04	2024	Ykkönen	14	4	—		—		—		14	4
Klubi 04	2025	Ykkösliiga	12	7	2	2	—		—		14	9
Klubi 04	Total		49	19	2	2	3	0	0	0	51	21
HJK	2023	Veikkausliiga	0	0	0	0	1	0	0	0	1	0
HJK	2024	Veikkausliiga	1	1	1	2	2	0	0	0	4	3
HJK	2025	Veikkausliiga	2	0	0	0	2	0	0	0	4	0
HJK	Total		3	1	1	2	5	0	0	0	9	3
Tallinna Kalev (loan)	2024	Meistriliiga	14	1	2	4	–		0	0	16	5
Career total			66	21	5	7	5	0	0	0	76	27

== Honours ==
Klubi 04

- Ykkönen: 2024

HJK

- Finnish League Cup: 2023

Finland U18

- Baltic Cup: 2023

Individual

- Ykkösliiga Player of the Month: May 2025
