= Liam Möller =

Finnish footballer (born 2004)

Personal information
- Date of birth: 21 December 2004 (age 21)
- Place of birth: Espoo, Finland
- Height: 1.82 m (6 ft 0 in)
- Position: Midfielder

Team information
- Current team: HJK
- Number: 22

Youth career
- –2016: EPS
- 2017–2023: HJK

Senior career*
Years	Team	Apps	(Gls)
2021–2024	Klubi 04	36	(2)
2023–	HJK	58	(8)

International career^{‡}
2019	Finland U16	2	(0)
2021	Finland U18	1	(0)
2022–	Finland U19	1	(0)
2024–	Finland U21	5	(0)
Medal record
HJK
First place	Veikkausliiga	2023
First place	Finnish League Cup	2023
- * Club domestic league appearances and goals as of 12 November 2026 ‡ National team caps and goals as of 19 November 2024

Liam Möller (born 21 December 2004) is a Finnish professional footballer who plays as a midfielder for Veikkausliiga club HJK.

== Club career ==
=== HJK Helsinki ===
Born in Espoo and raised in Kaitaa neighbourhood, Möller started playing football in Espoon Palloseura (EPS), before joining HJK youth academy at the age of 12. He signed his first professional contract with the club on 28 January 2022, on a three-year deal. Since 2021 Möller has been playing with the club's reserve team Klubi 04 in the second-tier Ykkönen and the third-tier Kakkonen. He made his debut with HJK first team in the early 2023, in the Finnish League Cup tournament, scoring two goals in three matches.

Möller scored a goal for HJK in his Veikkausliiga debut on 9 May 2023, in a 3–3 away draw against KTP Kotka, after coming in from the bench as a substitute to Aleksi Paananen on the 83rd minute.

Möller made his debut in the European competitions with HJK first team on 19 July 2023, after being substituted in the 2nd leg of the first qualifying round of the 2023-24 UEFA Champions League against Larne FC. Möller also represented HJK youth in the 2023-24 UEFA Youth League, scoring one goal in four matches in total, against Malmö FF and Nantes.

On 26 April 2024, while he was still recovering after a surgery, his contract was extended until the end of 2026 with a one-year option. On 24 October, in a UECL league phase match against Dinamo Minsk, Möller scored the winning goal in a 1–0 home victory.

== International career ==
Möller has represented Finland at under-16, under-18, and under-19 youth national team levels. He debuted with the Finland U21 national team on 6 September 2024, in an away win against Armenia in the 2025 UEFA Euro U21 Championship qualification.

== Career statistics ==
As of 29 April 2025

Appearances and goals by club, season and competition
Club	Season	League			Cup		League cup		Europe		Total	
Club	Season	Division	Apps	Goals	Apps	Goals	Apps	Goals	Apps	Goals	Apps	Goals
Klubi 04	2021	Ykkönen	1	0	0	0	—		—		1	0
Klubi 04	2022	Kakkonen	17	0	0	0	—		—		17	0
Klubi 04	2023	Kakkonen	16	2	0	0	—		—		16	2
Klubi 04	2024	Ykkönen	2	0	—		—		—		2	0
Klubi 04	Total		36	2	0	0	0	0	0	0	36	2
HJK Helsinki	2023	Veikkausliiga	1	1	1	0	3	2	1 (Note: Appearance(s) in UEFA Champions League)	0	6	3
HJK Helsinki	2024	Veikkausliiga	12	2	2	1	3	0	11 (Note: Appearances in UEFA Champions League and UEFA Conference League)	1	28	4
HJK Helsinki	2025	Veikkausliiga	3	0	0	0	1	0	0	0	4	0
HJK Helsinki	Total		16	3	3	1	7	2	12	1	38	7
Career total			52	5	3	1	7	2	12	1	74	9

== Honours ==
HJK

- Veikkausliiga: 2023
- Finnish Cup: 2025
- Finnish League Cup: 2023
