= Ramilson Almeida =

Brazilian footballer (born 1999)

Personal information
- Full name: Ramilson Almeida da Silva
- Date of birth: 21 August 1999 (age 27)
- Place of birth: Brazil
- Height: 1.87 m (6 ft 2 in)
- Position: Goalkeeper

Team information
- Current team: Gnistan
- Number: 22

Youth career
- –2018: Manaus
- 2018: Nacional
- 2019: Atlantis

Senior career*
Years	Team	Apps	(Gls)
2018	Nacional	0	(0)
2019–2021	Atlantis	31	(0)
2022	HIFK	14	(0)
2022	→ NJS (loan)	5	(0)
2023–2026	EIF	70	(0)
2026–	Gnistan	3	(0)
- * Club domestic league appearances and goals as of 27 July 2026

Ramilson Almeida da Silva (born 21 August 1999) is a Brazilian professional footballer who plays as a goalkeeper for Veikkausliiga club IF Gnistan.

== Career statistics ==
As of 6 May 2025

Appearances and goals by club, season and competition
Club	Season	League			National cup (Note: Includes Suomen Cup)		Continental		Other		Total	
Club	Season	Division	Apps	Goals	Apps	Goals	Apps	Goals	Apps	Goals	Apps	Goals
Nacional	2018	Série D	0	0	0	0	–		0	0	0	0
Atlantis	2019	Kolmonen	18	0	–		–		1 (Note: Includes Regions Cup)	0	19	0
Atlantis	2020	Kakkonen	13	0	–		–		–		13	0
Atlantis	Total		31	0	0	0	0	0	1	0	32	0
Atlantis Akatemia	2020	Kolmonen	4	0	–		–		–		4	0
Atlantis Akatemia	2021	Kolmonen	4	0	–		–		–		4	0
Atlantis Akatemia	Total		8	0	0	0	0	0	0	0	8	0
HIFK	2022	Veikkausliiga	14	0	1	0	–		1 (Note: Includes Finnish League Cup)	0	16	0
NJS (loan)	2022	Kakkonen	5	0	0	0	–		–		5	0
EIF Akademi	2023	Kolmonen	1	0	–		–		–		1	0
Ekenäs IF	2023	Ykkönen	25	0	1	0	–		4 (Note: Includes Ykköscup)	0	30	0
Ekenäs IF	2024	Veikkausliiga	24	0	4	0	–		4	0	32	0
Ekenäs IF	2025	Ykkösliiga	2	0	1	0	–		2 (Note: Includes Ykkösliigacup)	0	5	0
Ekenäs IF	Total		51	0	6	0	0	0	10	0	67	0
Career total			110	0	7	0	0	0	12	0	129	0

== Honours ==
EIF

- Ykkönen: 2023

Individual

- Ykkönen Goalkeeper of the Year: 2023
