= Benjamin Mulahalilovic =

Austrian footballer (born 1998)

Benjamin Mulahalilović
Personal information
- Date of birth: 21 October 1998 (age 28)
- Height: 1.80 m (5 ft 11 in)
- Position: Defensive midfielder

Team information
- Current team: ATUS Velden
- Number: 99

Youth career
- 2004–2012: Faakersee
- AKA Kärnten
- Austria Wien

Senior career*
| Years | Team | Apps | (Gls) |
| 2016–2017 | Austria Wien II | 2 | (0) |
| 2017–2018 | Wolfsberger AC II | 30 | (1) |
| 2018–2022 | Marchfeld Donauauen | 78 | (12) |
| 2022–2024 | SV Horn | 59 | (8) |
| 2024 | Lahti | 14 | (0) |
| 2025 | Riteriai | 17 | (1) |
| 2026– | ATUS Velden | 15 | (3) |
- * Club domestic league appearances and goals as of 27 June 2026

Benjamin Mulahalilović (born 21 October 1998) is an Austrian professional footballer who plays as a defensive midfielder for ATUS Velden.

== Club career ==
On 23 June 2022, Mulahalilovic signed with SV Horn in 2. Liga Austria, and was eventually appointed the team captain.

On 26 June 2024, he moved to Finland and signed with FC Lahti in the country's top-tier Veikkausliiga.

On 6 March 2025, it was announced that Mulahalilovic had signed with Riteriai in Lithuanian A Lyga.

== Career statistics ==
As of 27 June 2026

Appearances and goals by club, season and competition
| Club | Season | League | | | National cup (Note: Includes Austrian Cup and Lithuanian Cup) | | Other | | Total | |
| Club | Season | Division | Apps | Goals | Apps | Goals | Apps | Goals | Apps | Goals |
|---|---|---|---|---|---|---|---|---|---|---|
| Austria Wien II | 2016–17 | Austrian Regionalliga East | 2 | 0 | – | | – | | 2 | 0 |
| Wolfsberger AC | 2017–18 | Austrian Bundesliga | 0 | 0 | 0 | 0 | – | | 0 | 0 |
| Wolfsberger AC II | 2017–18 | Austrian Regionalliga Central | 30 | 1 | – | | – | | 30 | 1 |
| Marchfeld Donauauen | 2018–19 | Austrian Regionalliga East | 27 | 5 | 1 | 0 | – | | 28 | 5 |
| Marchfeld Donauauen | 2019–20 | Austrian Regionalliga East | 17 | 0 | 1 | 0 | – | | 18 | 0 |
| Marchfeld Donauauen | 2020–21 | Austrian Regionalliga East | 8 | 0 | 1 | 0 | – | | 9 | 0 |
| Marchfeld Donauauen | 2021–22 | Austrian Regionalliga East | 26 | 7 | 1 | 0 | – | | 27 | 7 |
| Marchfeld Donauauen | Total | | 78 | 12 | 4 | 0 | 0 | 0 | 82 | 12 |
| SV Horn | 2022–23 | Austrian 2. Liga | 30 | 4 | 3 | 2 | – | | 33 | 6 |
| SV Horn | 2023–24 | Austrian 2. Liga | 29 | 4 | 1 | 0 | – | | 30 | 4 |
| SV Horn | Total | | 59 | 8 | 4 | 2 | 0 | 0 | 63 | 10 |
| Lahti | 2024 | Veikkausliiga | 15 | 0 | 0 | 0 | 0 | 0 | 15 | 0 |
| Riteriai | 2025 | A Lyga | 17 | 1 | 1 | 0 | – | | 18 | 1 |
| ATUS Velden | 2025–26 | Austrian Regionalliga Central | 15 | 3 | 0 | 0 | – | | 15 | 3 |
| Career total | | | 216 | 25 | 9 | 2 | 0 | 0 | 225 | 27 |
