= Ognjen Stijepović =

Montenegrin footballer

Personal information
- Date of birth: 22 October 1999 (age 27)
- Place of birth: Podgorica, FR Yugoslavia
- Height: 1.85 m (6 ft 1 in)
- Position: Midfielder

Team information
- Current team: Nestos Chrysoupoli
- Number: 26

Youth career
- 2015–2016: Budućnost
- 2016–2017: Mladost

Senior career*
Years	Team	Apps	(Gls)
2017–2018	Mladost	18	(0)
2018–2021	Sampdoria	1	(0)
2019–2020	→ Pistoiese (loan)	17	(5)
2020–2021	→ Alessandria (loan)	7	(0)
2021	→ Grosseto (loan)	12	(0)
2021–2023	Spezia	0	(0)
2021–2022	→ Pistoiese (loan)	17	(1)
2022–2023	→ Imolese (loan)	18	(3)
2023	Mura	0	(0)
2023–2025	Dečić	43	(5)
2025–	Nestos Chrysoupoli	0	(0)

International career
2015–2016	Montenegro U17	6	(0)
2018–2020	Montenegro U21	12	(1)
- * Club domestic league appearances and goals as of 3 April 2025

Ognjen Stijepović (born 22 October 1999) is a Montenegrin professional footballer who plays as a midfielder for Super League Greece 2 club Nestos Chrysoupoli.

== Club career ==
On 19 July 2016, Stijepović made his Champions League debut in a qualifier against Ludogorets, at the age of 16. On 4 January 2018, Stijepović joined Sampdoria from Mladost. Stijepović made his professional debut for Sampdoria in a 1–0 Serie A loss to Sassuolo on 5 May 2018.

On 23 August 2019, he joined Pistoiese on a season-long loan.

On 28 September 2020, he moved on loan to Alessandria.

On 29 January 2021, he was recalled from Alessandria loan and loaned to Grosseto.

On 27 August 2021, he signed a three-year contract with Spezia; on the same day he returned to Pistoiese on loan. On 1 September 2022, Stijepović was loaned to Imolese.

In January 2023, Stijepović left Spezia and joined Slovenian PrvaLiga side Mura on a contract until 2025.

In August 2025, Stijepović with Nestos Chrysoupoli.

== International career ==
Stijepović was a youth international for Montenegro. He scored and assisted on his debut for the under-21 team in a 3–1 UEFA European Under-21 Championship qualification win over Luxembourg on 23 March 2018.
