= Santeri Silander =

Finnish footballer (born 2004)

Personal information
- Full name: Santeri Silander Catalán
- Date of birth: 20 April 2004 (age 22)
- Place of birth: Zaragoza, Spain
- Position: Right back

Team information
- Current team: AC Oulu
- Number: 29

Youth career
- –2016: LPS
- 2017–2022: HJK

Senior career*
Years	Team	Apps	(Gls)
2022–2024	Klubi 04	24	(0)
2023–2024	HJK	0	(0)
2024	OLS	2	(0)
2024–	AC Oulu	37	(1)

International career^{‡}
2019	Finland U16	2	(0)
- * Club domestic league appearances and goals as of 12 November 2026 ‡ National team caps and goals as of 14 September 2024

Santeri Silander Catalán (born 20 April 2004) is a Finnish professional football defender for Veikkausliiga club AC Oulu.

== Career ==
Silander played in the youth sector of Laajasalon Palloseura (LPS) in Laajasalo, Helsinki, before joining HJK youth academy in 2017. He made his senior debut with the club's reserve team Klubi 04 in 2022, playing in the third tier Kakkonen. He made his first team debut for HJK in Finnish League Cup in 2023.

After starting the 2024 season with Klubi 04 in third tier Ykkönen, in August 2024, Silander moved to Oulu to start his medical studies at the University of Oulu. He subsequently joined Oulun Luistinseura (OLS), the reserve team of Veikkausliiga club AC Oulu. On 14 September, Silander debuted in Veikkausliiga with AC Oulu first team, scoring a goal in a crucial 3–0 home win over Lahti.

== Personal life ==
Silander was born in Zaragoza, Spain, to Spanish mother and Finnish father and was raised in Finland. He has a dual citizenship.

== Career statistics ==
As of 26 February 2025

Appearances and goals by club, season and competition
Club	Season	League			Cup (Note: Includes Suomen Cup)		League cup (Note: Includes Finnish League Cup)		Europe		Total	
Club	Season	Division	Apps	Goals	Apps	Goals	Apps	Goals	Apps	Goals	Apps	Goals
Klubi 04	2022	Kakkonen	6	0	–		–		–		6	0
Klubi 04	2023	Kakkonen	15	0	–		–		–		15	0
Klubi 04	2024	Ykkönen	3	0	–		–		–		3	0
Klubi 04	Total		24	0	0	0	0	0	0	0	24	0
HJK Helsinki	2023	Veikkausliiga	0	0	0	0	1	0	0	0	1	0
HJK Helsinki	2024	Veikkausliiga	0	0	0	0	2	0	0	0	2	0
HJK Helsinki	Total		0	0	0	0	3	0	0	0	3	0
OLS	2024	Ykkönen	2	0	–		–		–		2	0
AC Oulu	2024	Veikkausliiga	3	1	–		–		–		3	1
AC Oulu	2025	Veikkausliiga	0	0	0	0	5	1	–		5	1
AC Oulu	Total		3	1	0	0	5	1	0	0	8	2
Career total			29	1	0	0	8	1	0	0	37	2
