= Aaro Soiniemi =

Finnish footballer (born 2005)

Personal information
- Date of birth: 8 August 2005 (age 21)
- Place of birth: Finland
- Position: Left back

Team information
- Current team: IFK Mariehamn
- Number: 3

Youth career
- –2013: NJS
- 2014–2022: KäPa

Senior career*
| Years | Team | Apps | (Gls) |
| 2022–2023 | KäPa | 24 | (1) |
| 2024–2025 | HJK | 0 | (0) |
| 2024–2025 | Klubi 04 | 18 | (0) |
| 2024 | → TPS (loan) | 23 | (2) |
| 2026– | IFK Mariehamn | 20 | (0) |

International career^{‡}
| 2022–2023 | Finland U18 | 8 | (0) |
Medal record
Finland U18
| First place | Baltic Cup | 2023 |
- * Club domestic league appearances and goals as of 13 November 2026 ‡ National team caps and goals as of 28 November 2023

Aaro Soiniemi (born 8 August 2005) is a Finnish professional footballer, playing as a left back for IFK Mariehamn.

== Club career ==
Soiniemi started to play football in a youth team of Nurmijärven Jalkapalloseura (NJS), before joining the renowned Käpylän Pallo (KäPa) youth academy when he was nine years old. He made his senior debut with KäPa first team in 2022 in Finnish third-tier league Kakkonen, and at the end of the season, KäPa won the promotion to second-tier Ykkönen.

On 14 November 2023, Soiniemi signed a three-year deal with Finnish champions HJK Helsinki. On 8 February 2024, Soiniemi was loaned out to second-tier Ykkösliiga club Turun Palloseura (TPS) for the 2024 season.

== International career ==
Soiniemi was part of the Finland U18 squad winning the friendly tournament Baltic Cup in June 2023.

== Career statistics ==
As of 13 November 2026

Appearances and goals by club, season and competition
| Club | Season | League | | | Cup (Note: Includes Suomen Cup) | | League cup (Note: Includes Ykköscup and Ykkösliigacup) | | Europe | | Total | |
| Club | Season | Division | Apps | Goals | Apps | Goals | Apps | Goals | Apps | Goals | Apps | Goals |
|---|---|---|---|---|---|---|---|---|---|---|---|---|
| KäPa | 2022 | Kakkonen | 12 | 0 | – | | – | | – | | 12 | 0 |
| KäPa | 2023 | Ykkönen | 12 | 1 | 1 | 0 | 4 | 0 | – | | 17 | 1 |
| KäPa | Total | | 24 | 1 | 1 | 0 | 4 | 0 | 0 | 0 | 29 | 1 |
| HJK | 2024 | Veikkausliiga | 0 | 0 | 0 | 0 | 0 | 0 | 0 | 0 | 0 | 0 |
| HJK | 2025 | Veikkausliiga | 0 | 0 | 0 | 0 | 1 | 0 | 0 | 0 | 1 | 0 |
| HJK | Total | | 0 | 0 | 3 | 0 | 1 | 0 | 0 | 0 | 4 | 0 |
| TPS (loan) | 2024 | Ykkösliiga | 23 | 2 | 4 | 0 | 3 | 0 | – | | 30 | 2 |
| Klubi 04 | 2025 | Ykkösliiga | 18 | 0 | 0 | 0 | 0 | 0 | – | | 18 | 0 |
| IFK Mariehamn | 2026 | Veikkausliiga | 20 | 0 | 2 | 1 | 3 | 0 | – | | 25 | 1 |
| Career total | | | 85 | 3 | 10 | 1 | 11 | 0 | 0 | 0 | 106 | 4 |
