= Alex Ramula =

Finnish footballer (born 2005)

Personal information
- Full name: Alex Ramula
- Date of birth: 17 January 2005 (age 21)
- Place of birth: Espoo, Finland
- Height: 1.84 m (6 ft 0 in)
- Position: Goalkeeper

Team information
- Current team: PK-35
- Number: 1

Youth career
- –2016: LePa
- 2016–2019: Espoo
- 2020–: HJK

Senior career*
Years	Team	Apps	(Gls)
2022–2025	Klubi 04	51	(0)
2023–2025	HJK	1	(0)
2026–	PK-35	27	(0)

International career^{‡}
2021–2022	Finland U17	7	(0)
2022	Finland U18	2	(0)
- * Club domestic league appearances and goals as of 18 October 2026 ‡ National team caps and goals as of 28 November 2023

Alex Ramula (born 17 January 2005) is a Finnish professional footballer, playing as a goalkeeper for Ykkösliiga club PK-35.

== Club career ==
Ramula started playing football in LePa in Leppävaara, before joining FC Espoo. In 2020, he moved to HJK organisation.

Ramula debuted in Veikkausliiga with HJK first team on 29 July 2023 in away game against SJK, after being substituted in for injured Dejan Iliev on the 13th minute.

Ramula also represented HJK youth in the 2023–24 UEFA Youth League, playing two matches against Nantes youth.

On 7 February 2024, Ramula extended his contract with HJK organisation on a deal for the 2024 season.

== International career ==
Ramula represented Finland at under-17 and under-18 youth national team levels.

== Honours ==
Klubi 04

- Ykkönen: 2024
