= Caique Chagas =

Brazilian footballer (born 1994)

Personal information
- Full name: Caique Augusto Correia Chagas
- Date of birth: 26 April 1994 (age 32)
- Place of birth: Barueri, Brazil
- Height: 1.84 m (6 ft 0 in)
- Position: Midfielder

Team information
- Current team: Otrant-Olympic
- Number: 8

Senior career*
| Years | Team | Apps | (Gls) |
| –2017 | Taubaté | | |
| 2017–2018 | Stade Bordelais | 4 | (0) |
| 2018–2019 | Arsenal Tivat | 29 | (4) |
| 2019–2020 | Zvijezda 09 | 19 | (0) |
| 2020–2021 | Bokelj | 16 | (5) |
| 2021–2022 | Sutjeska Nikšić | 45 | (1) |
| 2022–2023 | OFK Petrovac | 29 | (2) |
| 2023–2025 | Dečić | 60 | (8) |
| 2026– | Otrant-Olympic | 14 | (3) |
- * Club domestic league appearances and goals as of 18 June 2026

Caique Augusto Correia Chagas (born 26 April 1994) is a Brazilian professional footballer who plays as a midfielder for Montenegrin First League club Otrant-Olympic.

== Club career ==
=== Zvijezda 09 ===
In May 2019, Chagas signed for Bosnian club Zvijezda 09. Chagas left the club in summer of 2020.

=== Sutjeska Nikšić ===
In January 2021, Chagas signed for Montenegrin club Sutjeska Nikšić. Chagas left the club in summer of 2022.

== Career statistics ==
=== Club ===
As of match played 2 December 2023

Appearances and goals by club, season and competition
| Club | Season | League | | | National cup (Note: Appearance(s) in Bosnia and Herzegovina Football Cup, Montenegrin Cup) | | Europe | | Total | |
| Club | Season | League | Apps | Goals | Apps | Goals | Apps | Goals | Apps | Goals |
|---|---|---|---|---|---|---|---|---|---|---|
| Stade Bordelais | 2017–18 | Championnat National 2 | 4 | 0 | 0 | 0 | 0 | 0 | 4 | 0 |
| Arsenal Tivat | 2018–19 | 2.CFL | 29 | 4 | 0 | 0 | 0 | 0 | 29 | 4 |
| Zvijezda 09 | 2019–20 | Bosnian Premier League | 19 | 0 | 1 | 0 | 0 | 0 | 20 | 0 |
| Bokelj | 2020–21 | 2.CFL | 16 | 5 | 1 | 0 | 0 | 0 | 17 | 5 |
| Sutjeska Nikšić | 2020–21 | 1.CFL | 16 | 0 | 0 | 0 | 0 | 0 | 16 | 0 |
| Sutjeska Nikšić | 2021–22 | 1.CFL | 29 | 1 | 4 | 0 | 4 (Note: Appearance(s) in UEFA Europa Conference League) | 0 | 13 | 0 |
| Sutjeska Nikšić | Total | | 45 | 1 | 4 | 0 | 4 | 0 | 53 | 1 |
| OFK Petrovac | 2022–23 | 1.CFL | 29 | 2 | 1 | 0 | 0 | 0 | 30 | 2 |
| Dečić | 2023–24 | 1.CFL | 16 | 1 | 2 | 0 | 0 | 0 | 18 | 1 |
| Career total | | | 158 | 13 | 9 | 0 | 4 | 0 | 171 | 13 |

== Honours ==
Sutjeska Nikšić

- 1.CFL: 2021–22
