= Andreas Vaher =

Estonian footballer (born 2004)

Personal information
- Date of birth: 15 April 2004 (age 22)
- Place of birth: Tallinn, Estonia
- Height: 1.91 m (6 ft 3 in)
- Position: Defender

Team information
- Current team: Harju JK
- Number: 20

Youth career
- 2013–2021: Nõmme United
- 2021–2022: SPAL
- 2023: SC Freiburg

Senior career*
Years	Team	Apps	(Gls)
2019–2021	Nõmme United	8	(0)
2020	→ Flora II (loan)	12	(0)
2023	SC Freiburg II	0	(0)
2024	HJK	0	(0)
2024	Klubi 04	2	(0)
2024–2026	Flora	22	(3)
2025	Flora U21	7	(0)
2026–	Harju JK	7	(0)

International career^{‡}
2021–2023	Estonia U19	6	(0)
2022–	Estonia U21	11	(0)
2024–	Estonia	1	(0)
- * Club domestic league appearances and goals as of 24 July 2026 ‡ National team caps and goals as of 17 November 2025

Andreas Vaher (born 15 April 2004) is an Estonian professional footballer who plays as a defender for Meistriliiga club Harju JK and the Estonia national team.

== Early life ==
Vaher played for the youth sector of Nõmme United in his native Estonia, and made his senior debut with the club's first team in 2019, when the team played in Esiliiga B, Estonian third-tier. In the early 2021, he joined the youth academy of Italian club SPAL, and in June 2022, won the Italian under-18 championship with SPAL U18 team.

== Club career ==
In January 2023, Vaher moved to Germany and signed with SC Freiburg organisation. Without making a single appearance for the reserve team SC Freiburg II, he left the club one year later after having suffered an injury earlier in the summer.

On 24 January 2024, Vaher signed with Finnish champions HJK Helsinki on a short contract, with a deal including an option for extension.

On 1 July 2024, Vaher transferred to Flora Tallinn.

== International career ==
Vaher captained the Estonia U19 national team. He received his first call-up to Estonia senior national team in November 2022, for a friendly match against Lithuania, but remained an unused substitute. Vaher made his full international debut on 12 January 2024, in a friendly match against Sweden, during the training camp in Cyprus.

== Style of play ==
Vaher mainly operates as a central defender.

== Personal life ==
Vaher is a native of Tallinn, Estonia.

== Honours ==
SPAL U18

- Campionato under-18: 2021–22
