= 2025 HJK season =

115th season in existence of HJK Helsinki

HJK
2025 season
- Chairman: Olli-Pekka Lyytikäinen
- Manager: Toni Korkeakunnas (until 4 May); Miika Nuutinen (interim) (from 4 May)
- Stadium: Bolt Arena
- Veikkausliiga: 5th
- Finnish Cup: Winners
- League Cup: Runners-up
- UEFA Conference League: Second qualifying round vs Arda
- Top goalscorer: League: Teemu Pukki; Alexander Ring (14 each); All: Teemu Pukki (21 goals)
- Highest home attendance: 8,133 vs KuPS (31 May 2025)
- Lowest home attendance: 500 vs IF Gnistan (11 January 2025); 500 vs Haka (8 February 2025); 500 vs IFK Mariehamn (14 February 2025)
- Average home league attendance: 6,223 (9 November 2025)
Home colours	Away colours	Third colours

The 2025 season was Helsingin Jalkapalloklubi's 117th competitive season. HJK entered the Veikkausliiga season as four-time defending champions.

== Season events ==
On 9 January, HJK announced the signing of Liam Rippon from Sydney Olympic to a two-year contract with the option of an additional year.

On 10 January, Otto Hannula extended his contract with HJK until the end of the 2026 season.

On 15 January, Daniel O'Shaughnessy extended his contract with HJK until the end of the 2026 season.

On 18 January, Santeri Hostikka extended his contract with HJK until the end of the 2025 season.

On 21 January, Kevin Kouassivi-Benissan joined Košice on loan a deal until 30 June, with the option for the Slovak club to make the move permanent.

On 24 January, HJK announced the return of Teemu Pukki to a two-year contract, for an undisclosed fee.

On 5 February, HJK announced the return of Alexander Ring to a two-year contract, after he'd left Austin FC at the end of the previous year.

On 15 February, Kai Meriluoto joined NK Maribor on loan a deal until 30 June, with the option for the Slovenian club to make the move permanent.

On 27 February, Salem Bouajila joined SV Ried on loan a deal until 30 June, with the option for the Austrian club to make the move permanent.

On 7 March, HJK announced the singing of Cheikh Sidibé to a two-year contract, with an option of an additional year, from Azam.

On 28 March, HJK announced the singing of Benji Michel to a two-year contract.

On 31 March, Eemil Toivonen extended his contract with HJK until the end of the 2026 season, and joined IFK Mariehamn on loan for the season.

On 3 May, HJK announced that Ozan Kökçü's contract had been terminated at the request of the player.

On 4 May, HJK announced that Toni Korkeakunnas had been sacked as head coach, with Miika Nuutinen being appointed as interim head coach.

On 19 June, HJK announced that Kaius Simojoki had signed a new contract with the club, for the 2026 season, with an option for the 2027 season.

On 3 July, HJK announced that Hassane Bandé's contract had ended on 30 June and that he had left the club.

On 23 July, HJK announced the signing of Vicente Besuijen on loan from Aberdeen until the end of the season, with an option to make the move permanent.

On 8 August, HJK announced the signing of Mihailo Bogićević from Spartak Subotica on a contract until the end of the 2026 season, and that Kai Meriluoto and Thijmen Nijhuis had left the club to sign for IFK Värnamo and Waldhof Mannheim respectively.

On 15 August, HJK announced the signing of Yukiyoshi Karashima on loan from RFS until the end of the season with an option to make the move permanent.

On 21 August, HJK announced the signing of Ricardo Friedrich on loan from Malmö FF until the end of the season.

On 25 August, HJK announced that Cheikh Sidibé's contract had been terminated by mutual agreement.

On 26 August, HJK announced the signing of Ardit Tahiri on loan from Llapi until the end of the season, with an option to make the mover permanent.

On 27 August, HJK announced that Hadi Noori's contract had been terminated by mutual agreement.

On 23 September, Salem Bouajila joined Göztepe on loan a deal until 30 June 2026, with the option for the Turkish club to make the move permanent.

On 7 November, prior to their last game of the season, HJK announced that Elmo Henriksson, Kevin Kouassivi-Benissan and Georgios Kanellopoulos would all leave the club at the end of the season with their contracts not being renewed.

On 14 November, HJK announced that they had signed a new contract with Antton Nylund, until the end of the 2028 season.

On 19 November, HJK announced that Alex Ramula would be leaving the club at the end of the season to sign for PK-35.

On 28 November, HKJ announced that Emil Leveälahti and Toivo Mero had signed a new contracts with the club until the end of the 2027 season, and that Alex Lietsa would be leaving the club at the end of his contract to sign for AC Oulu.

On 30 November, HJK announced the appointment of Joonas Rantanen as their new head coach on a contract until the end of 2028.

On 5 December, HJK announced that they had signed a new one-year contract with Brooklyn Lyons-Foster, with the option of an additional year.

On 15 December, HJK announced that Kaius Hardén, Emil Ingman and Francis Etu would leave the club at the end of the season when their contracts expire.

On 19 December, HJK announced that Georgios Antzoulas would leave the club at the end of the season when their contract expires.

== Squad ==
As of match played 9 November 2025

No.	Name	Nationality	Position	Date of birth (age)	Signed from	Signed in	Contract ends	Apps.	Goals	
Goalkeepers
1	Jesse Öst	(Finland)	GK	20 October 1990 (aged 35)	SJK	2023	2026	56	0	
16	Elmo Henriksson	(Finland)	GK	10 March 2003 (aged 22)	Klubi 04	2021	2025	13	0	
30	Alex Ramula	(Finland)	GK	17 January 2005 (aged 20)	Klubi 04	2023		5	0	
32	Ricardo Friedrich	(Brazil)	GK	18 February 1993 (aged 32)	on loan from Malmö FF	2025	2025	12	0	
Defenders
2	Brooklyn Lyons-Foster	(England)	DF	1 December 2000 (aged 24)	Tottenham Hotspur	2024	2026 (+1)	63	4	
3	Georgios Antzoulas	(Greece)	GK	4 February 2000 (aged 25)	Újpest	2024	2025	50	3	
5	Daniel O'Shaughnessy	(Finland)	DF	14 September 1994 (aged 31)	Karlsruher SC	2024	2026	144	9	
6	Ville Tikkanen	(Finland)	DF	8 August 1999 (aged 26)	SJK	2025		42	0	
13	Kaius Simojoki	(Finland)	DF	21 March 2006 (aged 19)	KäPa	2024	2026(+1)	43	0	
18	Aaro Soiniemi	(Finland)	DF	8 August 2005 (aged 20)	KäPa	2024		4	0	
27	Kevin Kouassivi-Benissan	(Finland)	DF	25 January 1999 (aged 26)	Klubi 04	2018	2025	87	2	
28	Miska Ylitolva	(Finland)	DF	23 May 2004 (aged 21)	RoPS	2022	2026	68	2	
31	Mihailo Bogićević	(Serbia)	DF	30 May 1998 (aged 27)	Spartak Subotica	2025	2026	9	0	
Midfielders
4	Alexander Ring	(Finland)	MF	9 April 1991 (aged 34)	Unattached	2025	2026	84	24	
8	Georgios Kanellopoulos	(Greece)	MF	29 January 2000 (aged 25)	Asteras Tripolis	2023	2024(+1)	108	5	
10	Lucas Lingman	(Finland)	MF	25 January 1998 (aged 27)	Helsingborg	2024	2026	231	14	
15	Jere Kallinen	(Finland)	MF	10 January 2002 (aged 23)	AC Oulu	2025		32	4	
21	Pyry Mentu	(Finland)	MF	1 November 2006 (aged 19)	Klubi 04	2022	2027	47	2	
22	Liam Möller	(Finland)	MF	21 December 2004 (aged 20)	Klubi 04	2023		54	9	
41	Yukiyoshi Karashima	(Japan)	MF	15 January 1997 (aged 28)	on loan from RFS	2025	2025	2	0	
Forwards
7	Santeri Hostikka	(Finland)	FW	30 September 1997 (aged 28)	Pogoń Szczecin	2021	2025	156	26	
9	Ardit Tahiri	(Kosovo)	FW	6 October 2002 (aged 23)	on loan from Llapi	2025	2025	8	0	
17	Vicente Besuijen	(Netherlands)	FW	10 April 2001 (aged 24)	on loan from Aberdeen	2025	2025	16	1	
19	David Ezeh	(Finland)	FW	13 February 2006 (aged 19)	Klubi 04	2023	2026	37	6	
20	Teemu Pukki	(Finland)	FW	29 March 1990 (aged 35)	Minnesota United	2025	2026	77	40	
91	Ville Vuorinen	(Finland)	FW	21 February 2005 (aged 20)	Klubi 04	2023		11	2	
95	Stanislav Baranov	(Finland)	FW	15 April 2005 (aged 20)	Klubi 04	2023	2026	9	3	
99	Benji Michel	(United States)	FW	23 October 1997 (aged 28)	Unattached	2025	2026	36	9	
Klubi 04
43	Eino Tuominen	(Finland)	DF	23 May 2007 (aged 18)	Klubi 04	2025		1	0	
47	Emil Leveälahti	(Finland)	DF	22 August 2006 (aged 19)	Klubi 04	2024	2027	2	0	
48	Francis Etu	(Nigeria)	FW	10 April 2004 (aged 21)	Klubi 04	2023	2025	4	0	
49	Otto Hannula	(Finland)	MF	29 September 2005 (aged 20)	Klubi 04	2023	2026	7	1	
51	Kaius Hardén	(Finland)	FW	10 June 2004 (aged 21)	Klubi 04	2022		4	0	
53	Jere Kari	(Finland)	DF	24 February 2007 (aged 18)	Klubi 04	2024		0	0	
54	Adam Zaitra	(Finland)	MF	8 January 2008 (aged 17)	Klubi 04	2025		1	0	
57	Arop Ring	(Finland)	DF	18 January 2006 (aged 19)	Klubi 04	2025		4	0	
59	Eetu Grönlund	(Finland)	DF	8 August 2008 (aged 17)	Klubi 04	2025		1	0	
61	Valo Konttas	(Finland)	FW	7 August 2007 (aged 18)	Klubi 04	2025		1	0	
62	Leevi Palmula	(Finland)	MF	23 February 2008 (aged 17)	Klubi 04	2025		0	0	
63	Adam Le Goff-Conan	(Finland)	DF	21 April 2007 (aged 18)	Klubi 04	2025		0	0	
64	Peetu Hardén	(Finland)	MF	14 March 2007 (aged 18)	Klubi 04	2025		0	0	
67	Emil Ingman	(Finland)	FW	1 July 2006 (aged 19)	Klubi 04	2024		2	0	
68	Antton Nylund	(Finland)	MF	18 June 2008 (aged 17)	Klubi 04	2025	2028	1	0	
72	Art Berisha	(Kosovo)	MF	24 April 2006 (aged 19)	Klubi 04	2023		0	0	
73	Aaron Traore	(Finland)	DF	2 July 2007 (aged 18)	Klubi 04	2025		1	0	
74	Marlo Hyvönen	(Finland)	MF	2 May 2005 (aged 20)	Honka	2024		3	0	
77	Liam Rippon	(Australia)	FW	10 January 2005 (aged 20)	Sydney Olympic	2025	2026(+1)	1	0	
79	Jussi Tanska	(Finland)	GK	2 May 2006 (aged 19)	Klubi 04	2025		0	0	
87	Adiche Sabwele	(Finland)	FW	7 May 2007 (aged 18)	Klubi 04	2025		0	0	
89	Mitja Haapanen	(Finland)	GK	4 August 2007 (aged 18)	Klubi 04	2025		0	0	
92	Mustafa Abdulrasoul	(Finland)	DF	8 June 2006 (aged 19)	Klubi 04	2024		0	0	
94	Karlo Kajanoja	(Finland)	MF	3 June 2004 (aged 21)	Klubi 04	2025		0	0	
96	Ilmo Toivonen	(Finland)	DF	26 January 2007 (aged 18)	Klubi 04	2025		0	0	
97	Toivo Mero	(Finland)	FW	7 October 2007 (aged 18)	Klubi 04	2024	2027	12	0	
98	Alex Lietsa	(Finland)	DF	15 February 2005 (aged 20)	Klubi 04	2023		4	0	
Away on loan
11	Roni Hudd	(Finland)	FW	20 January 2005 (aged 20)	VPS	2024	2026(+1)	11	1	
24	Michael Boamah	(Finland)	DF	16 April 2003 (aged 22)	Klubi 04	2023	2026	31	1	
	Eemil Toivonen	(Finland)	MF	12 December 2006 (aged 18)	Klubi 04	2023	2026	2	0	
	Salem Bouajila	(Finland)	FW	1 August 2007 (aged 18)	Klubi 04	2025		1	0	
Left during the season
12	Cheikh Sidibé	(Senegal)	DF	25 April 1999 (aged 26)	Azam	2025	2026(+1)	1	0	
14	Matias Ritari	(Finland)	MF	15 July 2005 (aged 20)	Klubi 04	2023	2026(+1)	16	2	
16	Aaro Toivonen	(Finland)	MF	19 April 2005 (aged 20)	Klubi 04	2022	2025	10	0	
17	Hassane Bandé	(Burkina Faso)	FW	30 October 1998 (aged 27)	Amiens	2023	2025	55	10	
23	Ozan Kökçü	(Azerbaijan)	MF	18 August 1998 (aged 27)	FC Eindhoven	2025	2026	26		
25	Thijmen Nijhuis	(Netherlands)	GK	25 July 1998 (aged 27)	Utrecht	2024	2025	38	0	1
42	Kai Meriluoto	(Finland)	FW	2 January 2003 (aged 22)	Klubi 04	2020	2025	46	12	
58	Hadi Noori	(Sweden)	MF	20 April 2004 (aged 21)	AIK	2023		0	0	

== Transfers ==
=== In ===
Date	Position	Nationality	Name	From	Fee	Ref.
24 January 2025	MF	(Finland)	Teemu Pukki	Minnesota United	Undisclosed	
5 February 2025	MF	(Finland)	Alexander Ring	Unattached	Free	
7 March 2025	DF	(Senegal)	Cheikh Sidibé	Azam	Undisclosed	
28 March 2025	FW	(United States)	Benji Michel	Unattached	Free	
8 August 2025	DF	(Serbia)	Mihailo Bogićević	Spartak Subotica	Undisclosed	

=== Loans in ===
Start date	Position	Nationality	Name	From	End date	Ref.
23 July 2025	FW	(Netherlands)	Vicente Besuijen	Aberdeen	End of season	
15 August 2025	MF	(Japan)	Yukiyoshi Karashima	RFS	End of season	
21 August 2025	GK	(Brazil)	Ricardo Friedrich	Malmö FF	End of season	
26 August 2025	FW	(Kosovo)	Ardit Tahiri	Llapi	End of season	

=== Out ===
Date	Position	Nationality	Name	To	Fee	Ref.
10 January 2025	FW	(Finland)	Noah Pallas	Vålerenga	Undisclosed	
25 January 2025	FW	(Finland)	Anthony Olusanya	Kalmar	Undisclosed	
8 July 2025	MF	(Finland)	Aaro Toivonen	KTP	Undisclosed	
8 August 2025	FW	(Finland)	Kai Meriluoto	IFK Värnamo	Undisclosed	
8 August 2025	GK	(Netherlands)	Thijmen Nijhuis	Waldhof Mannheim	Undisclosed	
19 November 2025	GK	(Finland)	Alex Ramula	PK-35	Undisclosed	

=== Loans out ===
Start date	Position	Nationality	Name	To	End date	Ref.
21 January 2025	DF	(Finland)	Kevin Kouassivi-Benissan	Košice	30 June 2025	
15 February 2025	FW	(Finland)	Kai Meriluoto	NK Maribor	30 June 2025	
27 February 2025	FW	(Finland)	Salem Bouajila	SV Ried	30 June 2025	
31 March 2025	DF	(Finland)	Eemil Toivonen	IFK Mariehamn	End of season	
9 July 2025	MF	(Finland)	Matias Ritari	IF Gnistan	End of season	
9 July 2025	FW	(Finland)	Roni Hudd	Haka	End of season	
24 August 2025	DF	(Finland)	Michael Boamah	Haka	End of season	
23 September 2025	FW	(Finland)	Salem Bouajila	Göztepe	30 June 2026	

=== Released ===
Date	Position	Nationality	Name	Joined	Date	Ref.
3 May 2025	MF	(Azerbaijan)	Ozan Kökçü	Volendam	27 May 2025	
30 June 2025	FW	(Burkina Faso)	Hassane Bandé	KV Mechelen	23 October 2025	
25 August 2025	DF	(Senegal)	Cheikh Sidibé			
27 August 2025	MF	(Sweden)	Hadi Noori	IFK Haninge	29 August 2025	
31 December 2025	GK	(Finland)	Elmo Henriksson	TPS		
31 December 2025	DF	(Finland)	Kevin Kouassivi-Benissan	VPS		
31 December 2025	DF	(Finland)	Alex Lietsa	AC Oulu	1 January 2026	
31 December 2025	DF	(Greece)	Georgios Antzoulas	Ingolstadt 04		
31 December 2025	MF	(Greece)	Georgios Kanellopoulos	OFI Crete		
31 December 2025	FW	(Finland)	Kaius Hardén	Jaro		
31 December 2025	FW	(Finland)	Emil Ingman	SJK		
31 December 2025	FW	(Finland)	Santeri Hostikka	Vanspor	14 January 2026	
31 December 2025	FW	(Nigeria)	Francis Etu	Ekenäs		

== Friendlies ==
2025	–
EET (UTC+2)

== Competitions ==
=== Overall record ===
Competition	First match	Last match	Starting round	Final position	Record							
Competition	First match	Last match	Starting round	Final position	Pld	W	D	L	GF	GA	GD	Win %
Veikkausliiga	5 April 2025	9 November 2025	Matchday 1	5th	32	14	7	11	74	52	+22	43.75
Finnish Cup	28 May 2025	20 September 2025	Fifth round	Winners	5	5	0	0	9	1	+8	100.00
League Cup	11 January 2025	3 March 2025	Group stage	Runnersup	7	5	1	1	18	9	+9	71.43
UEFA Conference League	10 July 2025	31 July 2025	First qualifying round	Second qualifying round	4	1	2	1	7	6	+1	25.00
Total					48	25	10	13	108	68	+40	52.08

Last updated: 9 November 2025
Source: Competitions

=== Veikkausliiga ===
==== Regular season ====
===== Table =====
Pos	Team	Pld	W	D	L	GF	GA	GD	Pts	Qualification
1	Inter Turku	22	13	7	2	46	20	+26	46	Qualification for the Championship Round
2	Ilves	22	14	3	5	47	27	+20	45	Qualification for the Championship Round
3	HJK	22	14	2	6	59	29	+30	44	Qualification for the Championship Round
4	KuPS	22	13	5	4	39	23	+16	44	Qualification for the Championship Round
5	SJK	22	12	5	5	45	31	+14	41	Qualification for the Championship Round

Source: Flashscore
Rules for classification: 1) Points; 2) Goal difference; 3) Goals scored; 4) Head-to-head points; 5) Head-to-head goal difference; 6) Head-to-head away goals scored; 7) Play-off
(Note: Play-off is only played if need to decide champion, teams for relegation or UEFA competition and will be played on a neutral ground).

===== Results summary =====
Overall								Home						Away					
Pld	W	D	L	GF	GA	GD	Pts	W	D	L	GF	GA	GD	W	D	L	GF	GA	GD
22	14	2	6	59	29	+30	44	7	1	3	33	17	+16	7	1	3	26	12	+14

Last updated: 31 August 2025.
Source: See Matches

===== Matches =====
5 April 2025 1	Ilves	3–2	HJK	Tampere
15:00 EEST (UTC+3)	Ala-Myllymäki 38'; Hostikka 68' (o.g.); Tiitinen 77'	Report	Hostikka 4', 4'; Kanellopoulos (yellow card) 42'; Kallinen (yellow card) 90+2'	Stadium: Tammelan Stadion; Attendance: 7,651; Referee: Mohammad Al-Emara

11 April 2025 2	SJK	1–0	HJK	Seinäjoki
20:00 EEST (UTC+3)	Gasc (yellow card) 43'; Paananen 60'; Streng (yellow card) 90+1'	Report	Hostikka (yellow card) 43' (yellow-red card) 43'	Stadium: OmaSP Stadion; Attendance: 4,048; Referee: Peiman Simani

22 April 2025 3	HJK	0–1	IF Gnistan	Helsinki
19:00 EEST (UTC+3)	O'Shaughnessy (yellow card) 58'; Al.Ring (yellow card) 86'	Report	Latonen 60'; Kabashi (yellow card) 71'	Stadium: Bolt Arena; Attendance: 6,220; Referee: Joni Hyytiä

26 April 2025 4	HJK	3–1	VPS	Helsinki
19:00 EEST (UTC+3)	Pukki 4'; Mentu 45+1'; Bandé (yellow card) 88'; Michel 88'	Report	Ahiabu (yellow card) 38' (yellow-red card); Cicale 62'; Fall (yellow card) 76'	Stadium: Bolt Arena; Attendance: 4,120; Referee: Oliver Reitala

3 May 2025 5	Inter Turku	1–1	HJK	Turku
17:00 EEST (UTC+3)	Essomba 73'; Granlund (yellow card) 89'; Krebs (yellow card) FT	Report	Pukki 24'; Al.Ring (yellow card) 87'	Stadium: Veritas Stadion; Attendance: 4,489; Referee: Antti Munukka

11 May 2025 6	FF Jaro	0–3	HJK	Jakobstad
16:00 EEST (UTC+3)	Cissoko (yellow card) 78'; Myrevik (yellow card) 90+3'	Report	Michel 65'; Al.Ring 72'; Ezeh 82'	Stadium: Jakobstads Centralplan; Attendance: 2,346; Referee: Peiman Simani

17 May 2025 7	HJK	4–1	KTP	Helsinki
17:00 EEST (UTC+3)	Al.Ring 8'; Pukki 66'; Hostikka 70'; Kanellopoulos 90+1'	Report	Paavola (yellow card) 25'; Wilson 34'; Tanaka (yellow card) 44'	Stadium: Bolt Arena; Attendance: 6,525; Referee: Mohammad Al-Emara

20 May 2025 8	HJK	4–2	SJK	Helsinki
18:00 EEST (UTC+3)	Hostikka 8'; Al.Ring 15'; Pukki 35'; Machaal 56' (o.g.)	Report	Oksanen (yellow card) 49'; Väistö (yellow card) 55'; Karjalainen 68'; Gasc 88'	Stadium: Bolt Arena; Attendance: 6,158; Referee: Antti Munukka

24 May 2025 9	IFK Mariehamn	0–4	HJK	Mariehamn
19:00 EEST (UTC+3)	Olawale (yellow card) 66'	Report	Pukki 31'; Kanellopoulos (yellow card) 43'; Hostikka (yellow card) 49' (goal) 76'; Al.Ring 53'; Antzoulas 87'	Stadium: Wiklöf Holding Arena; Attendance: 1,250; Referee: Joni Hyytiä

31 May 2025 10	HJK	0–0	KuPS	Helsinki
19:00 EEST (UTC+3)	Kanellopoulos (yellow card) 31'; Pukki (yellow card) 56'	Report	Pennanen (yellow card) 11'; Oksanen (yellow card) 90+9'	Stadium: Bolt Arena; Attendance: 8,133; Referee: Mohammad Al-Emara

14 June 2025 11	AC Oulu	0–4	HJK	Oulu
17:00 EEST (UTC+3)	Bergsma (yellow card) 54'	Report	Kallinen 21'; Kanellopoulos (yellow card) 31' (goal) 78'; Al.Ring 71'; Antzoulas (yellow card) 75'; Möller (yellow card) 84'; Boamah 90+1'	Stadium: Raatti Stadium; Attendance: 3,649; Referee: Kalle Mäkinen

18 June 2025 12	HJK	3–1	Haka	Helsinki
21:00 EEST (UTC+3)	Al.Ring 13'; Pukki 23'; Michel 58'; Lingman (yellow card) 89'; Mentu (yellow card) 90+2'	Report	Da Sylva 26'; Okyere (yellow card) 78'	Stadium: Bolt Arena; Attendance: 4,457; Referee: Dennis Antamo

27 June 2025 13	KuPS	3–0	HJK	Kuopio
20:00 EEST (UTC+3)	Luyeye-Lutumba 3', 8', 71'	Report	Al.Ring (yellow card) 6'; Lyons-Foster (yellow card) 90'	Stadium: Kuopio Football Stadium; Attendance: 4,017; Referee: Peiman Simani

2 July 2025 14	HJK	2–3	FF Jaro	Helsinki
18:00 EEST (UTC+3)	Al.Ring 16'; Pukki 54'	Report	Ogungbaro (yellow card) 17'; Cissoko 56', 61'; Valenčič (yellow card) 59'; Vidjeskog (yellow card) 85'; Vikström 90+6'	Stadium: Bolt Arena; Attendance: 5,368; Referee: Joni Hyytiä

5 July 2025 15	VPS	0–2	HJK	Vaasa
19:00 EEST (UTC+3)	Haukioja (yellow card) 70'	Report	Kouassivi-Benissan 54', 70'; Simojoki (yellow card) 75'	Stadium: Hietalahti Stadium; Attendance: 4,632; Referee: Mohammad Al-Emara

20 July 2025 16	HJK	3–1	AC Oulu	Helsinki
18:30 EEST (UTC+3)	Michel 24'; Meriluoto 32'; Tikkanen (yellow card) 35'; Kallinen 56'	Report	Tiihonen (yellow card) 82'; Pitkänen 90'	Stadium: Bolt Arena; Attendance: 6,943; Referee: Antti Munukka

28 July 2025 17	IF Gnistan	2–4	HJK	Helsinki
19:00 EEST (UTC+3)	Bashkirov (red card) 21'; Europaeus 57' (yellow card) 67'; Raitala (yellow card) 67'; Latonen (yellow card) 72'; Atarah 81'	Report	Michel 38', 65'; Kallinen (yellow card) 41'; Hostikka 54'; Meriluoto 74'; Tikkanen (yellow card) 83'	Stadium: Oulunkylä Football Stadium; Attendance: 3,112; Referee: Dennis Antamo

4 August 2025 18	HJK	1–4	Inter Turku	Helsinki
19:00 EEST (UTC+3)	Kanellopoulos (yellow card) 38'; Al.Ring 70' (pen.)	Report	Krebs 18'; Botué 27'; Kuittinen (yellow card) 55'; Yli-Kokko 86'; Ampofo 90+1'	Stadium: Bolt Arena; Attendance: 7,003; Referee: Antti Munukka

11 August 2025 19	HJK	5–1	Ilves	Helsinki
19:00 EEST (UTC+3)	Pukki 70', 86'; Antzoulas 72'; Hostikka 89'; Al.Ring 90+3'	Report	Veteli (red card) 33'; Väisänen (yellow card) 34'; Jukkola 65'; Popovitch (yellow card) 90+1'	Stadium: Bolt Arena; Attendance: 7,879; Referee: Oliver Reitala

17 August 2025 20	Haka	1–2	HJK	Valkeakoski
15:00 EEST (UTC+3)	Mömmö 10' (yellow card) 69'; Selander (yellow card) 50'; Almén (yellow card) 84'; Friberg (yellow card) 87'	Report	Lingman (yellow card) 48' (goal) 67'; Antzoulas 51'	Stadium: Tehtaan kenttä Attendance: 3,211; Referee: Matti Roth

24 August 2025 21	HJK	8–2	IFK Mariehamn	Helsinki
15:00 EEST (UTC+3)	Besuijen 7'; Al.Ring 15' (pen.), 29' (pen.), 63'; Mentu 46'; Lyons-Foster 73', 89' (yellow card) 86'; Hostikka 77'	Report	Lindgren (red card) 13'; David 43'; Kujasalo 70'	Stadium: Bolt Arena; Attendance: 6,807; Referee: Joni Hyytiä

31 August 2025 22	KTP	1–4	HJK	Kotka
17:00 EEST (UTC+3)	Weckström 9'; Lahdensuo (yellow card) 59'; Tahmbi (yellow card) 73'	Report	Michel 31'; Lyons-Foster 36'; Simojoki (yellow card) 37'; Pukki 54'; Lingman (yellow card) 57'; Kallinen 76'	Stadium: Arto Tolsa Areena; Attendance: 3,412; Referee: Petri Viljanen

==== Championship round ====
===== Table =====
Pos	Team	Pld	W	D	L	GF	GA	GD	Pts	Qualification
2	Inter Turku	32	17	10	5	60	33	+27	61	Qualification for the Conference League first qualifying round
3	Ilves	32	18	6	8	68	45	+23	60	Qualification for the Conference League first qualifying round
4	SJK	32	17	8	7	70	51	+19	59	
5	HJK	32	14	7	11	74	52	+22	49	Qualification for the Conference League second qualifying round (Note: HJK qualified for the Conference League second qualifying round as the 2025 Finnish Cup winners.)
6	Gnistan	32	8	9	15	47	65	−18	33	

Source: Flashscore
Rules for classification: 1) Points; 2) Goal difference; 3) Goals scored; 4) Head-to-head points; 5) Head-to-head goal difference; 6) Head-to-head away goals scored; 7) Play-off
(Note: Play-off is only played if need to decide champion, teams for relegation or UEFA competition and will be played on a neutral ground).

===== Results summary =====
Overall								Home						Away					
Pld	W	D	L	GF	GA	GD	Pts	W	D	L	GF	GA	GD	W	D	L	GF	GA	GD
10	0	5	5	15	23	−8	5	0	2	3	8	12	−4	0	3	2	7	11	−4

Last updated: 9 November 2025.
Source: See Matches

===== Results =====
13 September 2025 23	SJK	3–3	HJK	Seinäjoki
19:00 EEST (UTC+3)	Paananen 16'; Karjalainen 36'; Obileye (yellow card) 81' (goal) 90+8'; Murilo (yellow card) 89'	Report	Pukki 8' (pen.), 24'; Lyons-Foster (yellow card) 18'; Mentu (yellow card) 57'; Hostikka 84' (pen.); Tikkanen (yellow card) 88'	Stadium: OmaSP Stadion; Attendance: 3,041; Referee: Mohammad Al-Emara

23 September 2025 24	Inter Turku	0–0	HJK	Turku
19:00 EEST (UTC+3)		Report	Mentu (yellow card) 85'	Stadium: Veritas Stadion; Attendance: 3,570; Referee: Joni Hyytiä

29 September 2025 25	HJK	2–2	Ilves	Helsinki
19:00 EEST (UTC+3)	Lingman 45+5'; Al.Ring 47'; Hostikka (yellow card) 78'	Report	Veteli 3'; Väisänen (yellow card) 59'; Stjopin 65'; Jukkola (yellow card) 90+1'; Ala-Myllymäki (yellow card) 90+4'	Stadium: Bolt Arena; Attendance: 6,436; Referee: Peiman Simani

3 October 2025 26	HJK	2–3	IF Gnistan	Helsinki
19:00 EEST (UTC+3)	Lingman 9'; Pukki 42'	Report	Hafstad 27' (yellow card) 47'; Bashkirov 55'; Väyrynen 90+3' (yellow card) 90+5'	Stadium: Bolt Arena; Attendance: 5,420; Referee: Antti Munukka

19 October 2025 27	KuPS	3–1	HJK	Kuopio
18:30 EEST (UTC+3)	Konate (yellow card) 8'; Ruoppi 17'; Parzyszek 57' (pen.); Sadiku 90'	Report	Lyons-Foster (yellow card) 45+1'; Kallinen 53'; Ricardo (yellow card) 55'	Stadium: Kuopio Football Stadium; Attendance: 3,257; Referee: Dennis Antamo

22 October 2025 28	HJK	3–4	SJK	Helsinki
19:00 EEST (UTC+3)	Michel 19'; Bogićević (yellow card) 36'; Pukki 62' (pen.); Ylitolva (yellow card) 67'; Obileye 86' (o.g.)	Report	Streng 12'; Vargas 27' (yellow card) 49'; Obileye (yellow card) 56'; Paananen (yellow card) 60'; Wilson 90+1'; Tessilimi 90+6' (yellow card) 90+7'	Stadium: Bolt Arena; Attendance: 5,747; Referee: Oliver Reitala

26 October 2025 29	HJK	1–1	Inter Turku	Helsinki
17:00 EET (UTC+2)	Pukki (yellow card) 13'; Al.Ring 33'	Report	Straalman 23'	Stadium: Bolt Arena; Attendance: 6,357; Referee: Peiman Simani

30 October 2025 30	Ilves	3–1	HJK	Tampere
19:00 EET (UTC+2)	Miettunen 22'; Stjopin 50'; Rale 65'	Report	Möller 5'; Kouassivi-Benissan (yellow card) 90+1'	Stadium: Tammelan Stadion; Attendance: 5,004; Referee: Antti Munukka

3 November 2025 31	IF Gnistan	2–2	HJK	Helsinki
19:00 EET (UTC+2)	Hänninen 18'; Bashkirov 90'	Report	Lingman 37'; Hostikka 45'; Mentu (yellow card) 86'	Stadium: Oulunkylä Football Stadium; Attendance: 2,307; Referee: Mohammad Al-Emara

9 November 2025 32	HJK	0–2	KuPS	Helsinki
15:00 EET (UTC+2)	Nylund (yellow card) 59'; Lyons-Foster (yellow card) 61'; Hostikka (yellow card) 66'	Report	Sadiku 19'; Toure 49'; Arifi (yellow card) 66'	Stadium: Bolt Arena; Attendance: 6,001; Referee: Mohammad Al-Emara

=== Finnish Cup ===
28 May 2025 Fifth round	HJK	2–1	JäPS	Helsinki
20:00 EEST (UTC+3)	Mero 45'; Öst (yellow card) 51'; Lingman (yellow card) 79'; Ar.Ring (yellow card) 83'; Ezeh 90+7'	Report	Holopainen 21'; Nikki (yellow card) 36'; Ahadi (yellow card) 64'	Stadium: Bolt Arena; Attendance: 1,409; Referee: Amir Hajizadeh

11 June 2025 Sixth round	MP	0–1	HJK	Mikkeli
19:00 EEST (UTC+3)	El Alami (yellow card) 24'; Ali-Abubakar (yellow card) 34'; Mami (yellow card) 38'; Forsell (yellow card) 75'	Report	Ezeh 47'; Lyons-Foster (yellow card) 87'	Stadium: Mikkelin Urheilupuisto; Attendance: 1,893; Referee: Kalle Nummela

24 June 2025 Quarterfinal	Klubi 04	0–4	HJK	Helsinki
12:00 EEST (UTC+3)	Traore (yellow card) 42'; Ingman (yellow card) 74'	Report	Hostikka 50'; Möller 52', 90+2'; Michel 72'	Stadium: Bolt Arena; Attendance: 512; Referee: Joona Manninen

21 August 2025 Semifinal	HJK	1–0	AC Oulu	Helsinki
19:00 EEST (UTC+3)	Al.Ring 75'	Report	Ojala (yellow card) 90+5'	Stadium: Bolt Arena; Attendance: 3,178; Referee: Antti Munukka

20 September 2025 Final	HJK	1–0	KuPS	Tampere
18:00 EEST (UTC+3)	Pukki 57'	Report		Stadium: Tammelan Stadion; Attendance: 5,355; Referee: Peiman Simani

=== League Cup ===
==== Group Stage ====
11 January 2025 1	HJK	0–1	IF Gnistan	Helsinki
14:00 EET (UTC+2)	Zaitra (yellow card) 61'	Report	Ajunwoko (yellow card) 13'; Väyrynen 41'; Kabashi (yellow card) 53'; Launiala (red card) 68'	Stadium: Tali halli TN; Attendance: 500; Referee: Peiman Simani

17 January 2025 2	Inter Turku	1–2	HJK	Turku
14:00 EET (UTC+2)	Vehkonen (yellow card) 31'; Guei 90+4'	Report	Vuorinen 30'; Kallinen (yellow card) 45+1'; Kanellopoulos (yellow card) 78'; Ritari 90+1'	Stadium: Veritas Stadion; Attendance: 238; Referee: Mohammad Al-Emara

8 February 2025 3	HJK	3–1	Haka	Helsinki
17:00 EET (UTC+2)	Ylitolva 29', 56'; Hostikka 58'; Lingman (yellow card) 80'	Report	Akintunde 39'; Traoré (yellow card) 44'; Friberg (yellow card) 74' (yellow-red card) 84'	Stadium: Tali halli TN; Attendance: 500; Referee: Oliver Reitala

14 February 2025 4	HJK	2–1	IFK Mariehamn	Helsinki
15:00 EET (UTC+2)	Kanellopoulos 6' (yellow card) 36'; Al.Ring (yellow card) 34'; Lingman (yellow card) 86' (goal) 90+1'	Report	Nissinen (yellow card) 51'; Lindgren 67'; Dahlström (yellow card) 83'; Andersson (yellow card) 87'	Stadium: Tali halli TN; Attendance: 500; Referee: Abdirahman Sugulle

18 February 2025 5	KTP	0–4	HJK	Kotka
18:00 EET (UTC+2)	Tanaka (yellow card) 58'; Glasson (yellow card) 70'	Report	Bandé 49'; Lingman (yellow card) 51'; Pukki 63', 65'; Kökçü 75'	Stadium: Arto Tolsa Areena; Attendance: 927; Referee: Mohammad Al-Emara

==== Knockout Stage ====
15 March 2025 Semi-final	HJK	3–1	KuPS	Helsinki
15:00 EET (UTC+2)	Pukki 33'; Cissé 57' (o.g.); Hudd 74'; Sidibé (yellow card) 88'	Report	Armah (yellow card) 3' (yellow-red card) 32'; Savolainen 25'	Stadium: Bolt Arena; Attendance: 2,578; Referee: Oliver Reitala

3 March 2025 Final	HJK	4–4 (7–8 p)	Inter Turku	Vantaa
13:00 EET (UTC+2)	Pukki 5', 54'; Tikkanen (yellow card) 31'; Bandé 48'; Hostikka 60'	Report	Krebs (yellow card) 35'; Legbo 49'; Järvinen 52'; Yli-Kokko 55'; Straalman (yellow card) 85'; Kekarainen 88'	Stadium: Myyrmäen jalkapallostadion Attendance: 2,002; Referee: Mohammad Al-Emara
	Penalties
	Bandé (penalty scored); Lingman (penalty scored); Antzoulas (penalty scored); Lyons-Foster (penalty scored); Kallinen (penalty scored); Al.Ring (penalty scored); Hudd (penalty scored); Kökçü (penalty missed)		(penalty scored) Kouame; (penalty scored) Legbo; (penalty scored) Järvinen; (penalty scored) Hämäläinen; (penalty scored) Straalman; (penalty scored) Granlund; (penalty scored) Kekarainen; (penalty scored) Sipola

=== UEFA Conference League ===
==== Qualifying rounds ====
10 July 2025 First qualifying round 1st leg	NSÍ (Faroe Islands)	4–0	(Finland) HJK	Klaksvík, Faroe Islands
21:45 EEST (UTC+3)	Joensen 12'; Ness (yellow card) 19' (goal) 35'; Obbekjær 76' (yellow card) 78'; Olsen 83'	Report	Kallinen (red card) 23'	Stadium: Við Djúpumýrar; Attendance: 521; Referee: Karl Koppel (Estonia)
Note: NSÍ Runavík played their home match at Við Djúpumýrar in Klaksvík, instead of their regular stadium, Við Løkin, in Runavík, which did not meet UEFA requirements.

17 July 2025 First qualifying round 2nd leg	HJK (Finland)	5–0 (a.e.t.) (5–4 agg.)	(Faroe Islands) NSÍ	Helsinki, Finland
19:00 EEST (UTC+3)	Lingman 18'; Al.Ring 53'; Hostikka 79', 93' (yellow card) 109'; Antzoulas 90+4'; Michel (yellow card) 105+2'	Report	Ness (red card) 15'; K.Joensen (yellow card) 90+5'; H.Diaby (yellow card) 100'; Osen (yellow card) 109'	Stadium: Töölö Football Stadium; Attendance: 3,175; Referee: Helgi Mikael Jónasson (Iceland)

24 July 2025 Second qualifying round 1st leg	Arda (Bulgaria)	0–0	(Finland) HJK	Kardzhali, Bulgaria
19:00 EEST (UTC+3)	Karagaren (yellow card) 33'; Vutov (yellow card) 34'; Hüseynov (yellow card) 47'; Kotev (yellow card) 85'	Report	Kanellopoulos (yellow card) 41'; Pukki (yellow card) 44'	Stadium: Arena Arda; Attendance: 3,500; Referee: Bulat Sariyev (Kazakhstan)

31 July 2025 Second qualifying round 2nd leg	HJK (Finland)	2–2 (a.e.t.) (2–2 agg.) (3–4 p)	(Bulgaria) Arda	Helsinki, Finland
19:00 EEST (UTC+3)	Meriluoto 38' (yellow card) 55'; Pukki 69'; Antzoulas (yellow card) 96'; Al.Ring (yellow card) 97'; Hostikka (yellow card) 104'	Report	Idowu 25'; Karagaren 86'; Shinyashiki (yellow card) 90+1'; Cascardo (yellow card) 108'	Stadium: Töölö Football Stadium; Attendance: 7,587; Referee: Iwan Arwel Griffith (Wales)
	Penalties
	Pukki (penalty scored); Michel (penalty missed); Hostikka (penalty scored); Al.Ring (penalty scored); Antzoulas (penalty missed)		(penalty scored) Vutov; (penalty scored) Velkovski; (penalty scored) Kotev; (penalty missed) Idowu; (penalty scored) Shinyashiki

== Squad statistics ==
As of match played 9 November 2025

=== Appearances and goals ===
No.	Pos	Nat	Player	Total		Veikkausliiga		Finnish Cup		League Cup		UEFA Conference League	
No.	Pos	Nat	Player	Apps	Goals	Apps	Goals	Apps	Goals	Apps	Goals	Apps	Goals
1	GK	(Finland) FIN	Jesse Öst	7	0	1	0	2	0	4	0	0	0
2	DF	(England) ENG	Brooklyn Lyons-Foster	32	3	14+5	3	2+1	0	4+2	0	3+1	0
3	DF	(Greece) GRE	Georgios Antzoulas	35	3	24	2	1+2	0	4	0	4	1
4	MF	(Finland) FIN	Alexander Ring	40	16	29+1	14	2	1	4	0	4	1
5	DF	(Finland) FIN	Daniel O'Shaughnessy	11	0	2+3	0	1	0	3+1	0	1	0
6	DF	(Finland) FIN	Ville Tikkanen	41	0	30	0	3	0	4+1	0	3	0
7	FW	(Finland) FIN	Santeri Hostikka	40	15	27+1	10	2+2	1	5	2	1+2	2
8	MF	(Greece) GRE	Georgios Kanellopoulos	34	4	23	3	1+2	0	3+2	1	3	0
9	FW	(Kosovo) KOS	Ardit Tahiri	8	0	0+7	0	0+1	0	0	0	0	0
10	MF	(Finland) FIN	Lucas Lingman	42	6	15+14	4	3+2	0	3+1	1	3+1	1
13	DF	(Finland) FIN	Kaius Simojoki	41	0	27+4	0	2+1	0	2+2	0	1+2	0
15	MF	(Finland) FIN	Jere Kallinen	32	4	11+12	4	2+2	0	1+1	0	2+1	0
16	GK	(Finland) FIN	Elmo Henriksson	6	0	5	0	1	0	0	0	0	0
17	FW	(Netherlands) NED	Vicente Besuijen	16	1	2+10	1	2	0	0	0	0+2	0
18	DF	(Finland) FIN	Aaro Soiniemi	4	0	0	0	3	0	1	0	0	0
19	FW	(Finland) FIN	David Ezeh	19	3	0+12	1	3	2	0+4	0	0	0
20	FW	(Finland) FIN	Teemu Pukki	39	21	25+4	14	1	1	5	5	4	1
21	MF	(Finland) FIN	Pyry Mentu	42	1	23+6	1	3+2	0	4+1	0	1+2	0
22	MF	(Finland) FIN	Liam Möller	20	3	10+7	1	0+2	2	1	0	0	0
27	DF	(Finland) FIN	Kevin Kouassivi-Benissan	13	2	2+7	2	0+1	0	0	0	2+1	0
28	DF	(Finland) FIN	Miska Ylitolva	38	2	25+2	0	2	0	5	2	3+1	0
30	GK	(Finland) FIN	Alex Ramula	2	0	0	0	1	0	1	0	0	0
31	DF	(Serbia) SRB	Mihailo Bogićević	9	0	5+2	0	1+1	0	0	0	0	0
32	GK	(Brazil) BRA	Ricardo Friedrich	12	0	10+1	0	1	0	0	0	0	0
41	MF	(Japan) JPN	Yukiyoshi Karashima	2	0	0+2	0	0	0	0	0	0	0
91	FW	(Finland) FIN	Ville Vuorinen	7	1	0+1	0	2+1	0	1+2	1	0	0
95	FW	(Finland) FIN	Stanislav Baranov	4	0	0+2	0	0	0	0+2	0	0	0
97	MF	(Finland) FIN	Toivo Mero	12	0	1+8	0	2	0	1	0	0	0
98	DF	(Finland) FIN	Alex Lietsa	3	0	0+1	0	1+1	0	0	0	0	0
99	FW	(United States) USA	Benji Michel	36	9	21+8	8	2+1	1	0	0	4	0
Players from Klubi-04 who appeared:
47	DF	(Finland) FIN	Emil Leveälahti	1	0	0+1	0	0	0	0	0	0	0
48	FW	(Finland) FIN	Francis Etu Gerrald	1	0	0	0	0	0	0+1	0	0	0
49	MF	(Finland) FIN	Otto Hannula	4	0	0	0	1	0	1+1	0	0+1	0
51	FW	(Finland) FIN	Kaius Hardén	1	0	0	0	0	0	1	0	0	0
57	DF	(Finland) FIN	Arop Ring	4	0	0	0	1+1	0	1+1	0	0	0
58	FW	(Australia) AUS	Liam Rippon	1	0	0	0	0	0	1	0	0	0
62	MF	(Finland) FIN	Adam Zaitra	1	0	0	0	0	0	1	0	0	0
63	DF	(Finland) FIN	Eino Tuominen	1	0	0	0	0	0	1	0	0	0
68	MF	(Finland) FIN	Antton Nylund	1	0	1	0	0	0	0	0	0	0
73	DF	(Finland) FIN	Aaron Traore	1	0	0	0	0	0	1	0	0	0
74	MF	(Finland) FIN	Marlo Hyvönen	2	0	0	0	0	0	1+1	0	0	0
95	FW	(Finland) FIN	Valo Konttas	1	0	0	0	0	0	0+1	0	0	0
96	DF	(Finland) FIN	Eetu Grönlund	1	0	0	0	0	0	1	0	0	0
Players away from the club on loan:
11	FW	(Finland) FIN	Roni Hudd	9	1	1+4	0	2	0	0+2	1	0	0
24	DF	(Finland) FIN	Michael Boamah	13	1	1+5	1	2	0	1+3	0	0+1	0
43	FW	(Finland) FIN	Salem Bouajila	1	0	0	0	0	0	0+1	0	0	0
Players who left HJK during the season:
12	DF	(Senegal) SEN	Cheikh Sidibé	1	0	0	0	0	0	0+1	0	0	0
14	MF	(Finland) FIN	Matias Ritari	10	1	0+2	0	3	0	3+2	1	0	0
16	MF	(Finland) FIN	Aaro Toivonen	1	0	0	0	0	0	0+1	0	0	0
17	FW	(Burkina Faso) BFA	Hassane Bandé	10	2	1+4	0	0	0	2+3	2	0	0
23	MF	(Azerbaijan) AZE	Ozan Kökçü	8	1	0+2	0	0	0	3+3	1	0	0
25	GK	(Netherlands) NED	Thijmen Nijhuis	23	0	16	0	0+1	0	2	0	4	0
42	FW	(Finland) FIN	Kai Meriluoto	9	3	1+2	2	0	0	1+1	0	1+3	1

=== Goal scorers ===
Place	Position	Nation	Number	Name	Veikkausliiga	Finnish Cup	League Cup	UEFA Conference League	Total
1	FW	(Finland)	20	Teemu Pukki	14	1	5	1	21
2	MF	(Finland)	4	Alexander Ring	14	1	0	1	16
3	FW	(Finland)	7	Santeri Hostikka	10	1	2	2	15
4	FW	(United States)	99	Benji Michel	8	1	0	0	9
5	MF	(Finland)	10	Lucas Lingman	4	0	1	1	6
6	MF	(Greece)	8	Georgios Kanellopoulos	3	0	1	0	4
6	MF	(Finland)	15	Jere Kallinen	4	0	0	0	4
8	DF	(England)	2	Brooklyn Lyons-Foster	3	0	0	0	3
8	FW	(Finland)	42	Kai Meriluoto	2	0	0	1	3
8	DF	(Greece)	3	Georgios Antzoulas	2	0	0	1	3
8	FW	(Finland)	19	David Ezeh	1	2	0	0	3
8	MF	(Finland)	22	Liam Möller	1	2	0	0	3
8				Own goal	2	0	1	0	3
14	DF	(Finland)	27	Kevin Kouassivi-Benissan	2	0	0	0	2
14	MF	(Finland)	21	Pyry Mentu	2	0	0	0	2
14	DF	(Finland)	28	Miska Ylitolva	0	0	2	0	2
14	FW	(Burkina Faso)	17	Hassane Bandé	0	0	2	0	2
18	DF	(Finland)	24	Michael Boamah	1	0	0	0	1
18	FW	(Netherlands)	17	Vicente Besuijen	1	0	0	0	1
18	FW	(Finland)	91	Ville Vuorinen	0	0	1	0	1
18	MF	(Finland)	14	Matias Ritari	0	0	1	0	1
18	MF	(Azerbaijan)	23	Ozan Kökçü	0	0	1	0	1
18	FW	(Finland)	11	Roni Hudd	0	0	1	0	1
18	MF	(Finland)	97	Toivo Mero	0	1	0	0	1
TOTALS					74	9	18	7	108

=== Clean sheets ===
Place	Position	Nation	Number	Name	Veikkausliiga	Finnish Cup	League Cup	UEFA Conference League	Total
1	GK	(Netherlands)	25	Thijmen Nijhuis	5	1	1	2	9
2	GK	(Brazil)	32	Ricardo Friedrich	1	1	0	0	2
3	GK	(Finland)	1	Jesse Öst	0	1	0	0	1
3	GK	(Finland)	30	Alex Ramula	0	1	0	0	1
3	GK	(Finland)	16	Elmo Henriksson	0	1	0	0	1
TOTALS					6	4	1	2	13

Jesse Öst & Thijmen Nijhuis both played in HJK's 1-0 victory over MP on 11 June 2025

=== Disciplinary record ===
Number	Nation	Position	Name	Veikkausliiga		Finnish Cup		League Cup		UEFA Conference League		Total	
Number	Nation	Position	Name	Booked	Sent off (straight red)	Booked	Sent off (straight red)	Booked	Sent off (straight red)	Booked	Sent off (straight red)	Booked	Sent off (straight red)
1	(Finland)	GK	Jesse Öst	0	0	1	0	0	0	0	0	1	0
2	(England)	DF	Brooklyn Lyons-Foster	5	0	1	0	0	0	0	0	6	0
3	(Greece)	DF	Georgios Antzoulas	1	0	0	0	0	0	1	0	2	0
4	(Finland)	MF	Alexander Ring	4	0	0	0	1	0	1	0	6	0
5	(Finland)	DF	Daniel O'Shaughnessy	1	0	0	0	0	0	0	0	1	0
6	(Finland)	DF	Ville Tikkanen	3	0	0	0	1	0	0	0	4	0
7	(Finland)	FW	Santeri Hostikka	5	1	0	0	0	0	2	0	7	1
8	(Greece)	MF	Georgios Kanellopoulos	5	0	0	0	2	0	1	0	8	0
10	(Finland)	MF	Lucas Lingman	3	0	1	0	3	0	0	0	5	0
13	(Finland)	DF	Kaius Simojoki	2	0	0	0	0	0	0	0	2	0
15	(Finland)	MF	Jere Kallinen	2	0	0	0	1	0	0	1	3	1
20	(Finland)	FW	Teemu Pukki	2	0	0	0	0	0	1	0	3	0
21	(Finland)	MF	Pyry Mentu	4	0	0	0	0	0	0	0	4	0
22	(Finland)	MF	Liam Möller	1	0	0	0	0	0	0	0	1	0
27	(Finland)	DF	Kevin Kouassivi-Benissan	1	0	0	0	0	0	0	0	1	0
28	(Finland)	DF	Miska Ylitolva	1	0	0	0	0	0	0	0	1	0
31	(Serbia)	DF	Mihailo Bogićević	1	0	0	0	0	0	0	0	1	0
32	(Brazil)	GK	Ricardo Friedrich	1	0	0	0	0	0	0	0	1	0
68	(Finland)	MF	Antton Nylund	1	0	0	0	0	0	0	0	1	0
99	(United States)	FW	Benji Michel	1	0	0	0	0	0	0	0	1	0
Players from Klubi-04:
57	(Finland)	DF	Arop Ring	0	0	1	0	0	0	0	0	1	0
62	(Finland)	MF	Adam Zaitra	0	0	0	0	1	0	0	0	1	0
Players away on loan:
Players who left HJK during the season:
12	(Senegal)	DF	Cheikh Sidibé	0	0	0	0	1	0	0	0	1	0
17	(Burkina Faso)	FW	Hassane Bandé	1	0	0	0	0	0	0	0	1	0
42	(Finland)	FW	Kai Meriluoto	0	0	0	0	0	0	1	0	1	0
TOTALS				43	1	4	0	10	0	8	1	65	2
