= Matias Ritari =

Finnish footballer (born 2005)

Personal information
- Full name: Matias Tapio Ritari
- Date of birth: 15 July 2005 (age 21)
- Place of birth: Finland
- Position: Midfielder

Team information
- Current team: FC Rosengård
- Number: 6

Youth career
- 2011: PPJ
- 2011–2023: HJK

Senior career*
Years	Team	Apps	(Gls)
2023–2025	Klubi 04	51	(9)
2023–2026	HJK	3	(0)
2025	→ Gnistan (loan)	14	(1)
2026–	FC Rosengård	26	(0)

International career^{‡}
2023	Finland U18	2	(0)
2023	Finland U19	3	(0)
2024–	Finland U21	1	(0)
- * Club domestic league appearances and goals as of 16 November 2026 ‡ National team caps and goals as of 30 August 2024

Matias Tapio Ritari (born 15 July 2005) is a Finnish professional footballer who plays as a midfielder for Ettan Södra side FC Rosengård.

== Early career ==
Ritari started football in a youth team of PPJ in 2011 when aged five, but after a few training sessions he joined a newly established district youth team of HJK Helsinki in Töölö neighbourhood.

Ritari captained the HJK U17 team in 2022, and helped the team to win the league of their age group. He signed his first contract with HJK organisation on 7 November 2022.

== Club career ==
=== HJK ===
Ritari made his senior debut for HJK in a Finnish League Cup match against Inter Turku in February 2023. In the 2023 season, he played for the club's reserve team Klubi 04 in third-tier Kakkonen. He represented HJK in the 2023–24 UEFA Youth League in all four games, where the team advanced by winning Malmö FF, but was eventually knocked out by Nantes in the 2nd round on penalties, after a 1–1 aggregate draw.

In 2024, Ritari captained Klubi 04 in the new third-tier Ykkönen. He also made two appearances scoring a goal in Finnish League Cup, and two appearances in Finnish Cup for HJK first team. On 30 August 2024, he signed a professional contract with the club, on a deal until the end of 2026 with a one-year option. At the end of the season, Klubi 04 won the Ykkönen title and earned a promotion to Ykkösliiga. On 19 December 2024, in a UEFA Conference League match against Real Betis, Ritari came on from the bench as a late substitute to Georgios Kanellopoulos, in a 1–0 away loss at the Estadio Benito Villamarín. He made his league debut on 11 May 2025, in a 3–0 away win over Jaro.

On 9 July 2025, he was loaned to Gnistan.

=== FC Rosengård ===
On 5 March 2026, Ritari officially joined Ettan Södra side FC Rosengård for an undisclosed fee.

== Career statistics ==
As of 5 March 2026

Appearances and goals by club, season and competition
Club	Season	League			Cup (Note: Includes Suomen Cup)		League cup (Note: Includes Finnish League Cup)		Europe		Total	
Club	Season	Division	Apps	Goals	Apps	Goals	Apps	Goals	Apps	Goals	Apps	Goals
Klubi 04	2023	Kakkonen	23	3	0	0	—		—		23	3
Klubi 04	2024	Ykkönen	25	6	—		—		—		25	6
Klubi 04	2025	Ykkösliiga	3	0	—		—		—		3	0
Klubi 04	Total		51	9	0	0	0	0	0	0	51	9
HJK	2023	Veikkausliiga	0	0	0	0	1	0	0	0	1	0
HJK	2024	Veikkausliiga	0	0	2	0	2	1	1 (Note: Appearance(s) in UEFA Conference League)	0	5	1
HJK	2025	Veikkausliiga	3	0	3	0	5	1	0	0	11	1
HJK	2026	Veikkausliiga	–		–		2	0	–		2	0
HJK	Total		3	0	5	0	10	2	1	0	19	2
Gnistan	2025	Veikkausliiga	14	1	–		–		–		14	1
FC Rosengård	2026	Ettan Södra	0	0	0	0	—		—		0	0
Career total			68	10	5	0	10	2	1	0	84	12

== Honours ==
HJK

- Finnish League Cup: 2023

Klubi 04

- Ykkönen: 2024
