= Pyry =

Pyry may refer to:

- Pyry (given name), a Finnish given name
- Pyry, Warsaw, a neighborhood in Warsaw, Poland
- VL Pyry, Finnish fighter trainer aircraft
