= Jere Kallinen =

Finnish footballer (born 2002)

Personal information
- Date of birth: 10 January 2002 (age 24)
- Place of birth: Oulu, Finland
- Height: 1.78 m (5 ft 10 in)
- Position: Defensive midfielder

Team information
- Current team: HJK
- Number: 15

Youth career
- –2019: OLS

Senior career*
Years	Team	Apps	(Gls)
2019–2024	AC Oulu	93	(1)
2020–2022	→ OLS (loan)	11	(1)
2025–	HJK	43	(4)

International career^{‡}
2021–2023	Finland U21	5	(0)
Medal record
AC Oulu
First place	Ykkönen	2020
Second place	Finnish League Cup	2023
- * Club domestic league appearances and goals as of 12 November 2026 ‡ National team caps and goals as of 16 November 2023

Jere Kallinen (born 10 January 2002) is a Finnish professional football player who plays as a defensive midfielder for Veikkausliiga club HJK Helsinki.

== Club career ==
=== AC Oulu ===
Born in Oulu and raised in Ritaharju, Kallinen spent all his youth years with Oulun Luistinseura (OLS), before signing his first professional contract with Ykkönen side AC Oulu on 21 December 2019, at the age of 17. He made his professional debut with the club on 27 June 2020, in a 2–0 home win against Gnistan. Kallinen contributed in 10 matches and helped AC Oulu to win the promotion to Veikkausliiga at the end of the 2020 season. He scored his first goal for his club in Veikkausliiga on 9 May 2021, in a 3–1 away defeat against IFK Mariehamn.

On 28 October 2021, his contract was extended until the end of 2024.

In May 2022, in a Veikkausliiga match against HIFK, Kallinen suffered a surgery-requiring knee injury from a late tackle by Mosawer Ahadi, and was ruled out for few months.

After the 2024 season, Kallinen announced he would leave Oulu. During five seasons, he made 114 appearances for the club in all competitions combined.

=== HJK ===
On 25 November 2024, HJK Helsinki announced the signing of Kallinen on a two-year deal with a one-year option.

== International career ==
Kallinen has represented Finland at under-21 youth national team level.

== Career statistics ==
As of 12 November 2026

Appearances and goals by club, season and competition
Club	Season	League			National cup		League cup		Europe		Total	
Club	Season	Division	Apps	Goals	Apps	Goals	Apps	Goals	Apps	Goals	Apps	Goals
OLS
OLS	2019	Kakkonen	1	0	—		—		—		1	0
OLS	2020	Kakkonen	9	1	—		—		—		9	1
OLS	2022	Kakkonen	1	0	—		—		—		1	0
OLS	Total		11	1	0	0	0	0	0	0	11	1
AC Oulu	2020	Ykkönen	10	0	6	0	—		—		16	0
AC Oulu	2021	Veikkausliiga	25	1	2	0	—		—		27	1
AC Oulu	2022	Veikkausliiga	17	0	2	0	3	0	—		22	0
AC Oulu	2023	Veikkausliiga	22	0	3	0	0	0	—		25	0
AC Oulu	2024	Veikkausliiga	19	0	3	0	2	0	—		24	0
AC Oulu	Total		93	1	16	0	5	0	0	0	114	1
HJK	2025	Veikkausliiga	23	4	4	0	2	0	3 (Note: Appearance(s) in UEFA Conference League)	0	34	4
HJK	2026	Veikkausliiga	20	0	3	0	5	0	1	0	29	0
HJK	Total		43	4	7	0	7	0	4	0	63	4
Career total			147	6	23	0	11	0	4	0	185	6

== Honours ==
AC Oulu

- Ykkönen: 2020
- Finnish League Cup runner-up: 2023

HJK

- Finnish Cup: 2025
