= Elmo Henriksson =

Finnish footballer (born 2003)

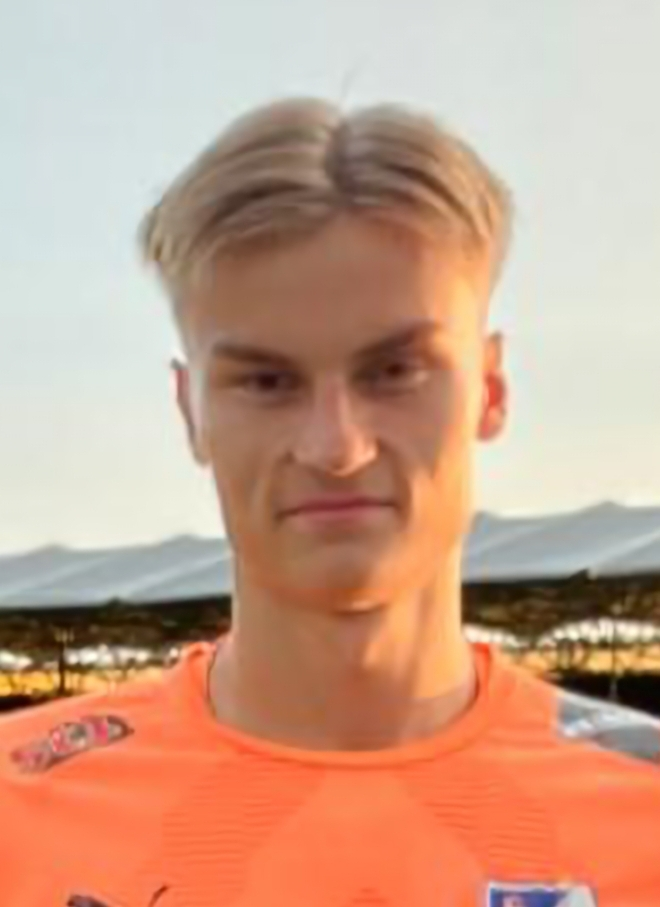
- Henriksson with IFK Mariehamn in 2023

Personal information
- Full name: Elmo Veikko Oskari Henriksson
- Date of birth: 10 March 2003 (age 23)
- Place of birth: Kirkkonummi, Finland
- Height: 2.01 m (6 ft 7 in)
- Position: Goalkeeper

Team information
- Current team: TPS
- Number: 1

Youth career
- –2015: KyIF
- 2016–2021: HJK

Senior career*
Years	Team	Apps	(Gls)
2019–2024	Klubi 04	27	(0)
2022–2023	→ IFK Mariehamn (loan)	42	(0)
2024–2025	HJK	9	(0)
2024–2025	→ Sporting Atlético (loan)	18	(0)
2026–	TPS	26	(0)

International career^{‡}
2018	Finland U16	1	(0)
2021–2022	Finland U19	3	(0)
2023–	Finland U21	3	(0)
- * Club domestic league appearances and goals as of 30 October 2026 ‡ National team caps and goals as of 25 March 2025

Elmo Veikko Oskari Henriksson (born 10 March 2003) is a Finnish professional footballer who plays as a goalkeeper. He plays for Veikkausliiga club TPS.

== Club career ==
Henriksson began his career with KyIF in Kirkkonummi before moving to HJK Helsinki in 2016. On 6 October 2020, Henriksson signed a professional contract with HJK, on a three-year deal. During the 2020 and 2021 seasons, he played for the club's reserve team Klubi 04 in third-tier Kakkonen and second-tier Ykkönen.

Henriksson was loaned out to fellow Veikkausliiga side IFK Mariehamn for the 2022 and the 2023 seasons. In November 2022, his contract with HJK was extended until the end of 2024.

On 3 February 2024, after eight years with the club, Henriksson debuted with HJK first team in a 2–1 Finnish League Cup win against Gnistan. On 4 May 2024, Henriksson made his HJK league debut, keeping a clean sheet in a 0–0 home draw against Ekenäs IF.

On 11 July 2024, his contract with HJK was extended for the 2025, and simultaneously he was loaned out to Segunda División club Sporting Gijón.

Henriksson left HJK at the end of the 2025 season following the expiration of his contract.

== International career ==
Henriksson has represented Finland in various youth levels. On 30 December 2022, he was called up to the Finland senior national team for the first time, for two friendly matches against Sweden and Estonia in January 2023, but he remained an unused substitute.

== Career statistics ==
As of 27 July 2026

Appearances and goals by club, season and competition
Club	Season	League			National cup (Note: Includes Suomen Cup)		League cup (Note: Includes Finnish League Cup)		Continental		Total	
Club	Season	Division	Apps	Goals	Apps	Goals	Apps	Goals	Apps	Goals	Apps	Goals
Klubi 04	2020	Kakkonen	1	0	0	0	—		—		1	0
Klubi 04	2021	Ykkönen	25	0	2	0	—		—		27	0
Klubi 04	2024	Ykkönen	1	0	—		—		—		1	0
Klubi 04	Total		27	0	2	0	0	0	0	0	29	0
IFK Mariehamn (loan)	2022	Veikkausliiga	18	0	0	0	1	0	—		19	0
IFK Mariehamn (loan)	2023	Veikkausliiga	24	0	2	0	3	0	—		29	0
IFK Mariehamn (loan)	Total		42	0	2	0	4	0	0	0	48	0
HJK	2024	Veikkausliiga	4	0	1	0	2	0	0	0	7	0
HJK	2025	Veikkausliiga	5	0	1	0	0	0	0	0	6	0
HJK	Total		9	0	3	0	2	0	0	0	13	0
Sporting Gijón (loan)	2024–25	Segunda División	0	0	0	0	–		–		0	0
Sporting Atlético (loan)	2024–25	Tercera Federación	18	0	–		–		–		18	0
TPS	2026	Veikkausliiga	17	0	1	0	2	0	0	0	20	0
Career total			113	0	7	0	8	0	0	0	128	0

== Honours ==
HJK

- Finnish Cup: 2025
