= Kevin Kouassivi-Benissan =

Finnish footballer (born 1999)

Personal information
- Full name: Kevin Daté Kouassivi-Benissan
- Date of birth: 25 January 1999 (age 27)
- Place of birth: Tornio, Finland
- Height: 1.85 m (6 ft 1 in)
- Position: Right-back

Team information
- Current team: VPS
- Number: 27

Youth career
- –2016: HJK

Senior career*
Years	Team	Apps	(Gls)
2016–2023	Klubi 04	49	(11)
2018–2025	HJK	55	(4)
2019	→ RoPS (loan)	8	(1)
2020	→ Inter Turku (loan)	19	(1)
2022	→ Lahti (loan)	23	(1)
2025	→ Košice (loan)	10	(0)
2026–	VPS	27	(1)

International career^{‡}
2016	Finland U17	2	(0)
2017	Finland U19	1	(0)
2019	Finland U21	3	(0)
- * Club domestic league appearances and goals as of 13 November 2026 ‡ National team caps and goals as of 29 June 2020

Kevin Daté Kouassivi-Benissan (born 25 January 1999) is a Finnish professional footballer who plays as a right-back for VPS in the Veikkausliiga.

== Club career ==
=== HJK Helsinki ===
Kouassivi-Benissan grew up in Helsinki, and spent his entire junior career with HJK Helsinki. He represented HJK youth in 2016–17 UEFA Youth League. After playing for the club's reserve team Klubi 04 since 2016 in second-tier Ykkönen and third-tier Kakkonen, he made his Veikkausliiga debut with the first team on 14 July 2018, at age 19, against TPS.

==== Loans to Inter Turku, RoPS and Lahti ====
On 2 August 2019, Kouassivi-Benissan joined RoPS on loan for the rest of the 2019 season.

On 28 November 2019, it was announced that Kouassivi-Benissan was loaned out to Inter Turku for the 2020 season. He would reunite with former HJK coach José Riveiro.

In the 2021 season, he made only six appearances in the league for HJK, as injuries limited his playing time throughout the season.

On 17 March 2022, Kouassivi-Benissan joined Lahti on loan for the 2022 season. He played in 23 league matches during the season, scoring one goal.

=== Return to HJK ===
After spending three seasons on loan in three different Veikkausliiga teams, Kouassivi-Benissan started the 2023 season in HJK squad. During the season, he made a breakthrough as he recorded five assists in a span of nine league matches. He also made 11 appearances for HJK in the club's 2023–24 European campaign, in which HJK qualified to the UEFA Europa Conference League group stage. On 6 November 2023, Kouassivi-Benissan extended his contract with HJK, signing a new two-year deal until the end of 2025.

==== Loan to Košice ====
On 21 January 2025, Kouassivi-Benissan was loaned out to Slovak First League club Košice for the remainder of the season.

=== Vaasan Palloseura ===
After his contract with HJK expired at the end of 2025, Kouassivi-Benissan signed with VPS ahead of the 2026 season.

== International career ==
Kouassivi-Benissan has represented Finland at youth international levels.

On 24 August 2023, it was reported in Finnish media that Kouassivi-Benissan had considered a possibility to represent Togo at senior international level, after receiving numerous contacts from Togolese Football Federation.

On 30 August 2023, he received his first call-up to the Finland senior national team by head coach Markku Kanerva, for two UEFA Euro 2024 qualifying matches against Kazakhstan and Denmark, but remained an unused substitute.

== Personal life ==
Kouassivi-Benissan was born in Finland to Finnish mother and Togolese father, and was raised in Pikku Huopalahti, Helsinki. In an interview in the early 2022, Kouassivi-Benissan said he doesn't have a Togolese passport and hasn't visited the country. Besides his native languages Finnish and English, he speaks French. He attended the English school in Meilahti.

== Career statistics ==
As of 8 July 2025

Appearances and goals by club, season and competition
Club	Season	League			National cup (Note: Includes Suomen Cup and Slovak Cup)		League cup		Continental		Total	
Club	Season	Division	Apps	Goals	Apps	Goals	Apps	Goals	Apps	Goals	Apps	Goals
Klubi 04	2016	Kakkonen	1	0	0	0	—		—		1	0
Klubi 04	2017	Kakkonen	20	3	2	0	—		—		22	3
Klubi 04	2018	Ykkönen	23	7	4	0	—		—		27	7
Klubi 04	2019	Kakkonen	2	1	0	0	—		—		2	1
Klubi 04	2020	Kakkonen	0	0	0	0	—		—		0	0
Klubi 04	2021	Ykkönen	2	0	0	0	—		—		2	0
Klubi 04	2023	Kakkonen	1	0	0	0	—		—		1	0
Klubi 04	Total		49	11	6	0	0	0	0	0	55	11
HJK Helsinki	2018	Veikkausliiga	2	0	0	0	—		0 (Note: Appearances in UEFA Champions League)	0	2	0
HJK Helsinki	2019	Veikkausliiga	8	0	5	0	—		2	0	15	0
HJK Helsinki	2020	Veikkausliiga	0	0	0	0	—		—		2	0
HJK Helsinki	2021	Veikkausliiga	6	0	1	0	—		4 (Note: Includes UEFA Champions League, UEFA Europa League and UEFA Europa Conference League)	0	11	0
HJK Helsinki	2022	Veikkausliiga	0	0	0	0	2	0	0	0	2	0
HJK Helsinki	2023	Veikkausliiga	11	0	0	0	4	0	11	0	26	0
HJK Helsinki	2024	Veikkausliiga	17	0	0	0	3	0	3 (Note: Appearances in UEFA Champions League and UEFA Conference League)	0	23	0
HJK Helsinki	2025	Veikkausliiga	2	2	0	0	0	0	0	0	2	2
HJK Helsinki	Total		46	2	6	0	9	0	20	0	76	2
RoPS (loan)	2019	Veikkausliiga	8	1	—		—		—		8	1
Inter Turku (loan)	2020	Veikkausliiga	19	1	6	0	—		1 (Note: Includes UEFA Europa League)	0	26	1
Lahti (loan)	2022	Veikkausliiga	23	1	6	0	0	0	—		29	1
Košice (loan)	2024–25	Slovak First League	10	0	1	0	–		–		11	0
Career total			155	16	25	0	9	0	21	0	210	16

== Honours ==
=== HJK ===
- Veikkausliiga: 2018, 2021, 2023
- Finnish Cup: 2025
- Finnish League Cup: 2023
