= Santeri Hostikka =

Finnish footballer (born 1997)

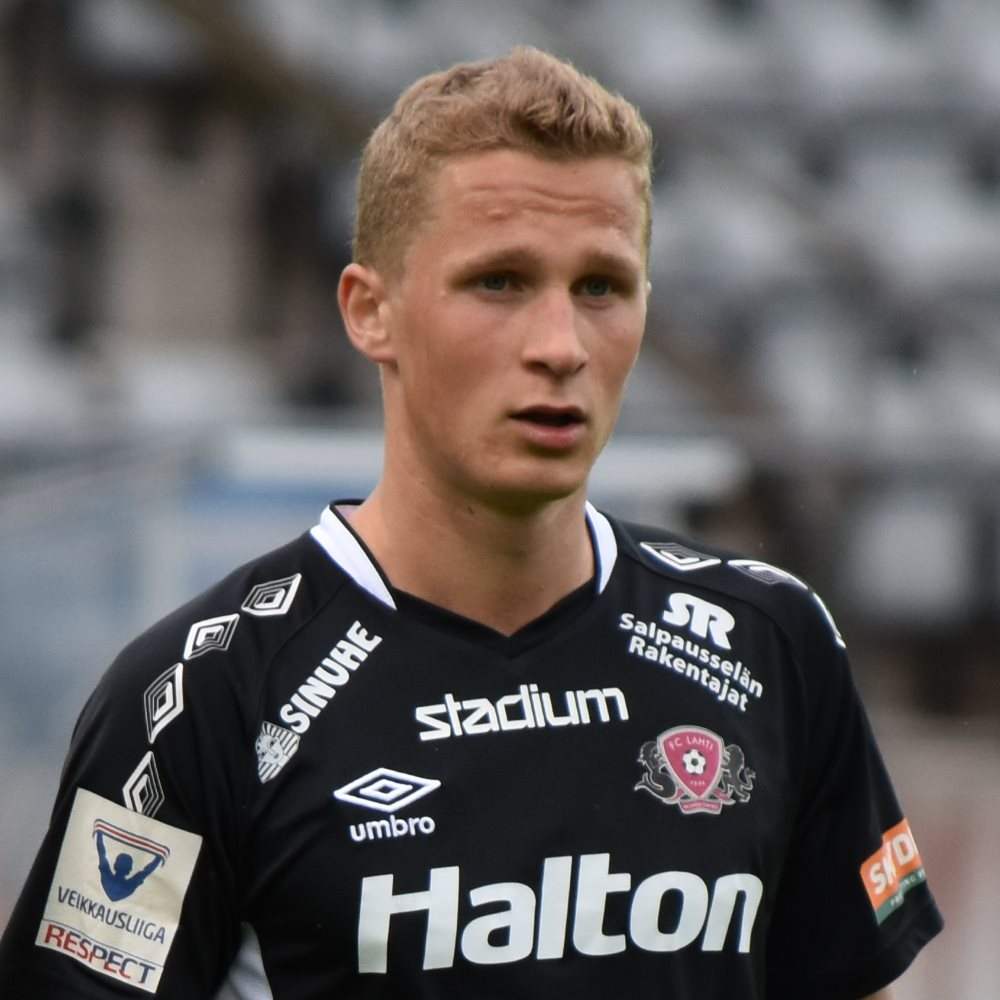
- Hostikka with Lahti

Personal information
- Date of birth: 30 September 1997 (age 29)
- Place of birth: Järvenpää, Finland
- Height: 1.83 m (6 ft 0 in)
- Position: Winger

Team information
- Current team: Ümraniyespor

Youth career
- PKKU

Senior career*
Years	Team	Apps	(Gls)
2014–2015	PKKU	28	(5)
2016–2018	Lahti	87	(11)
2019–2021	Pogoń Szczecin	47	(1)
2020–2021	Pogoń Szczecin II	2	(0)
2021–2025	HJK	98	(19)
2026	Vanspor	19	(5)
2026–	Ümraniyespor	0	(0)

International career^{‡}
2017–2018	Finland U21	12	(1)
2021–	Finland	6	(0)
- * Club domestic league appearances and goals as of 6 May 2026 ‡ National team caps and goals as of 18 June 2023

Santeri Hostikka (born 30 September 1997) is a Finnish professional footballer who plays as a winger for TFF 1. Lig club Ümraniyespor.

== Club career ==
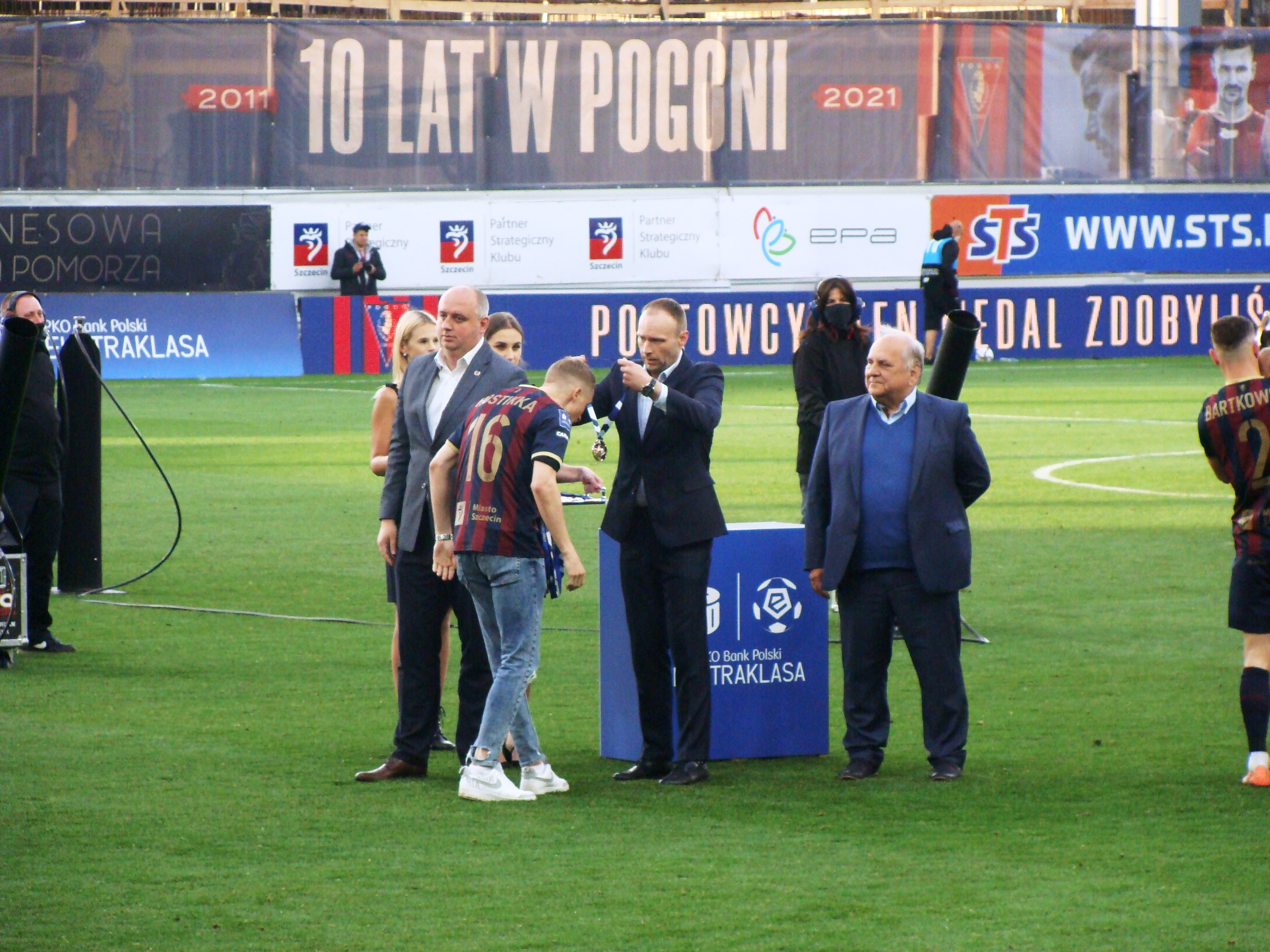
Hostikka receiving bronze medal with Pogoń Szczecin at the end of the 2020–21 Ekstraklasa season.

Hostikka began his senior career in the lower Finnish divisions with PKKU before moving to Veikkausliiga side FC Lahti in 2016.

In December 2018, Hostikka signed with Polish Ekstraklasa club Pogoń Szczecin, with the transfer taking effect in January 2019.

In August 2021, he returned to Finland to join HJK. During the 2025 season, despite missing over two weeks with pneumonia, Hostikka returned to the lineup on 17 July 2025 for a UEFA Conference League qualifying match against NSÍ Runavík. Entering as a substitute, he scored twice and provided an assist to help HJK advance with a 5–4 aggregate victory.

In January 2026, Hostikka moved to Turkish TFF 1. Lig club Vanspor during the winter transfer window, signing a contract until June 2027.

== International career ==
He played for the Finland under-21 team.

He was first called up to the Finland national football team in January 2018 for a friendly against Jordan, but did not play then. He made his debut on 1 September 2021 in a friendly against Wales. He started the game and was substituted after 64 minutes of play in a 0–0 draw at home.

== Career statistics ==
=== Club ===
As of 19 April 2026

Appearances and goals by club, season and competition
Club	Season	League			National cup (Note: Includes Finnish Cup and Polish Cup)		League cup (Note: Includes Finnish League Cup)		Europe		Total	
Club	Season	Division	Apps	Goals	Apps	Goals	Apps	Goals	Apps	Goals	Apps	Goals
PK Keski-Uusimaa	2014	Kakkonen	4	1	0	0	—		—		4	1
PK Keski-Uusimaa	2015	Kakkonen	24	4	0	0	—		—		24	4
PK Keski-Uusimaa	Total		28	5	0	0	0	0	0	0	28	5
FC Lahti	2016	Veikkausliiga	29	4	2	1	6	1	—		37	6
FC Lahti	2017	Veikkausliiga	30	3	4	1	—		—		34	4
FC Lahti	2018	Veikkausliiga	28	4	6	2	—		2 (Note: Appearance(s) in UEFA Europa League)	0	36	6
FC Lahti	Total		87	11	12	4	6	1	2	0	107	16
Pogoń Szczecin	2018–19	Ekstraklasa	8	0	0	0	—		—		8	0
Pogoń Szczecin	2019–20	Ekstraklasa	27	1	0	0	—		—		27	1
Pogoń Szczecin	2020–21	Ekstraklasa	12	0	2	0	—		—		14	0
Pogoń Szczecin	Total		47	1	2	0	0	0	0	0	49	1
Pogoń Szczecin II	2020–21	III liga	2	0	—		—		—		2	0
HJK	2021	Veikkausliiga	10	1	—		—		7 (Note: Two appearances in UEFA Europa League, five appearances in UEFA Europa Conference League)	0	17	1
HJK	2022	Veikkausliiga	20	2	3	0	0	0	13 (Note: Three appearances in UEFA Champions League, ten appearances and one goal in UEFA Europa League)	1	36	3
HJK	2023	Veikkausliiga	22	3	1	0	3	0	9 (Note: One appearance in UEFA Champions League, two appearances and one goal in UEFA Europa League, six appearances and one goal in UEFA Europa Conference League)	2	35	5
HJK	2024	Veikkausliiga	14	2	1	0	3	0	10 (Note: Two appearances in UEFA Champions League, eight appearances in UEFA Conference League)	0	28	2
HJK	2025	Veikkausliiga	28	10	2	1	5	2	3 (Note: Appearances in UEFA Conference League)	2	38	15
HJK	Total		94	18	7	1	11	2	42	5	154	26
Vanspor	2025–26	TFF 1. Lig	19	5	0	0	—		—		19	5
Ümraniyespor	2026–27	TFF 1. Lig	0	0	0	0	–		–		0	0
Career total			277	40	23	5	23	3	44	5	367	53

=== International ===
As of match played 20 November 2023

Appearances and goals by national team and year
National team	Year	Apps	Goals
Finland	2021	1	0
Finland	2022	3	0
Finland	2023	2	0
Total		6	0

== Honours ==
Lahti

- Finnish League Cup: 2016

HJK

- Veikkausliiga: 2021, 2022, 2023
- Finnish Cup: 2025
- Finnish League Cup: 2023

Individual

- Veikkausliiga Player of the Month: July 2017
- Veikkausliiga top assist provider: 2017
