= Pyry (given name) =

Pyry (pronunciation: Finnish pronunciation: [ˈpyry]) is a male (on rare occasions female as well) Finnish name with the meaning 'snowstorm', and may refer to:

- Pyry Hannola (born 2001), Finnish footballer
- Pyry Jaala (Are), Finnish rap artist
- Pyry Karjalainen (Puhuva Kone), Finnish rap artist
- Pyry Kärkkäinen, Finnish footballer
- Pyry Luminen, Finnish architect and designer (female)
- Pyry Mentu (born 2006), Finnish footballer
- Pyry Mikkola, Finnish violinist
- Pyry Niskala, Finnish discus thrower
- Pyry Piirainen (born 2000), Finnish footballer
- Pyry Rainamaa, Finnish basketball player
- Pyry Soiri (born 1994), Finnish footballer
