= Lucas Lingman =

Finnish footballer (born 1998)

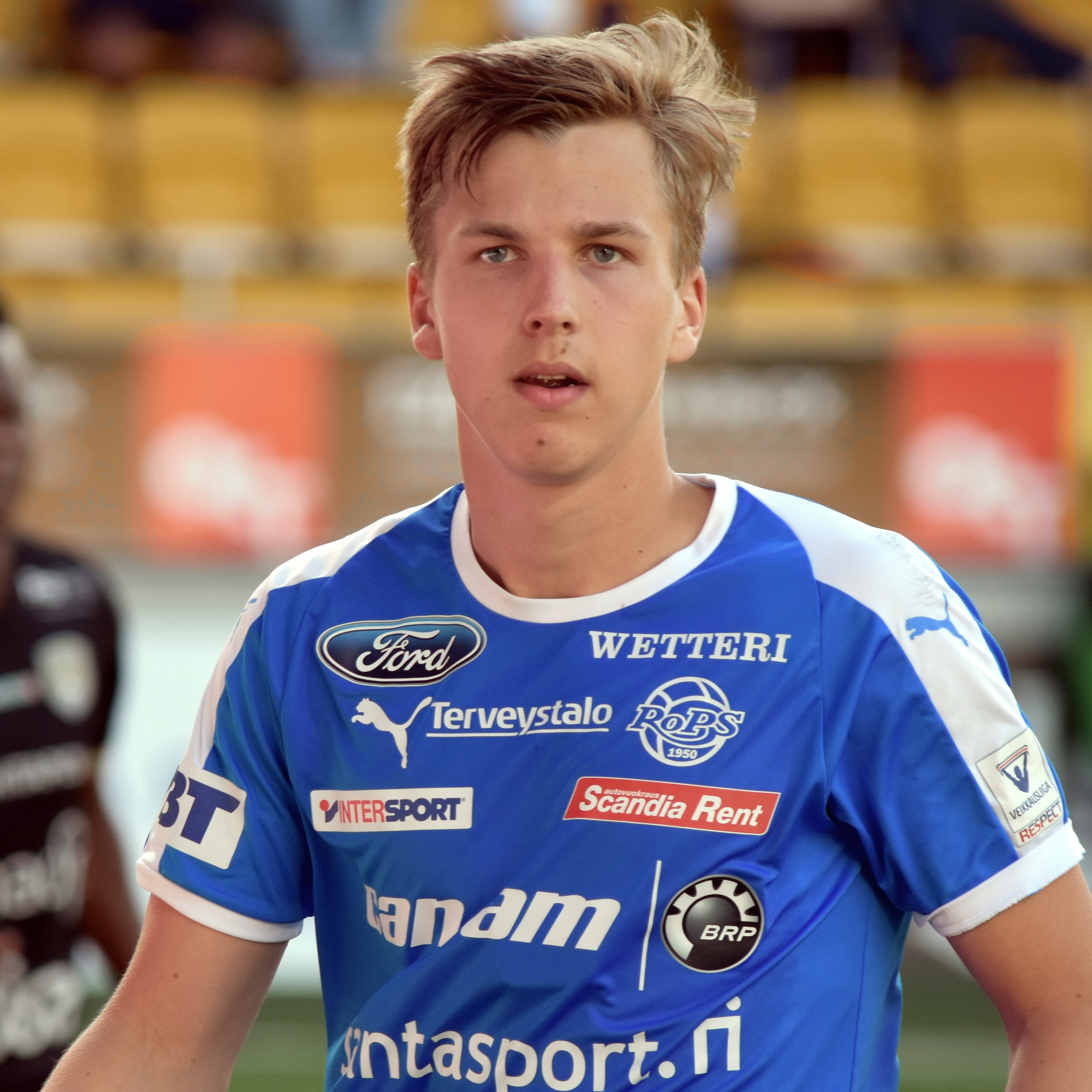
- Lingman with RoPS in 2018.

Personal information
- Date of birth: 25 January 1998 (age 28)
- Place of birth: Espoo, Finland
- Height: 1.78 m (5 ft 10 in)
- Position: Midfielder

Team information
- Current team: HJK
- Number: 10

Youth career
- –2010: Honka
- 2011–2014: HJK

Senior career*
Years	Team	Apps	(Gls)
2014–2017	Klubi-04	47	(5)
2015–2017	HJK	21	(1)
2018–2019	RoPS	58	(8)
2020–2021	HJK	41	(4)
2022–2023	Helsingborgs IF	15	(0)
2022–2023	→ HJK (loan)	27	(0)
2024–	HJK	76	(8)

International career^{‡}
2013	Finland U15	6	(2)
2014	Finland U16	17	(8)
2015–2016	Finland U18	15	(1)
2015	Finland U19	3	(0)
2019–2020	Finland U21	14	(0)
2022–	Finland	11	(0)
- * Club domestic league appearances and goals as of 12 November 2026 ‡ National team caps and goals as of 20 November 2023

Lucas Lingman (born 25 January 1998) is a Finnish professional footballer who plays as a midfielder for HJK.

== Career ==
=== HJK ===
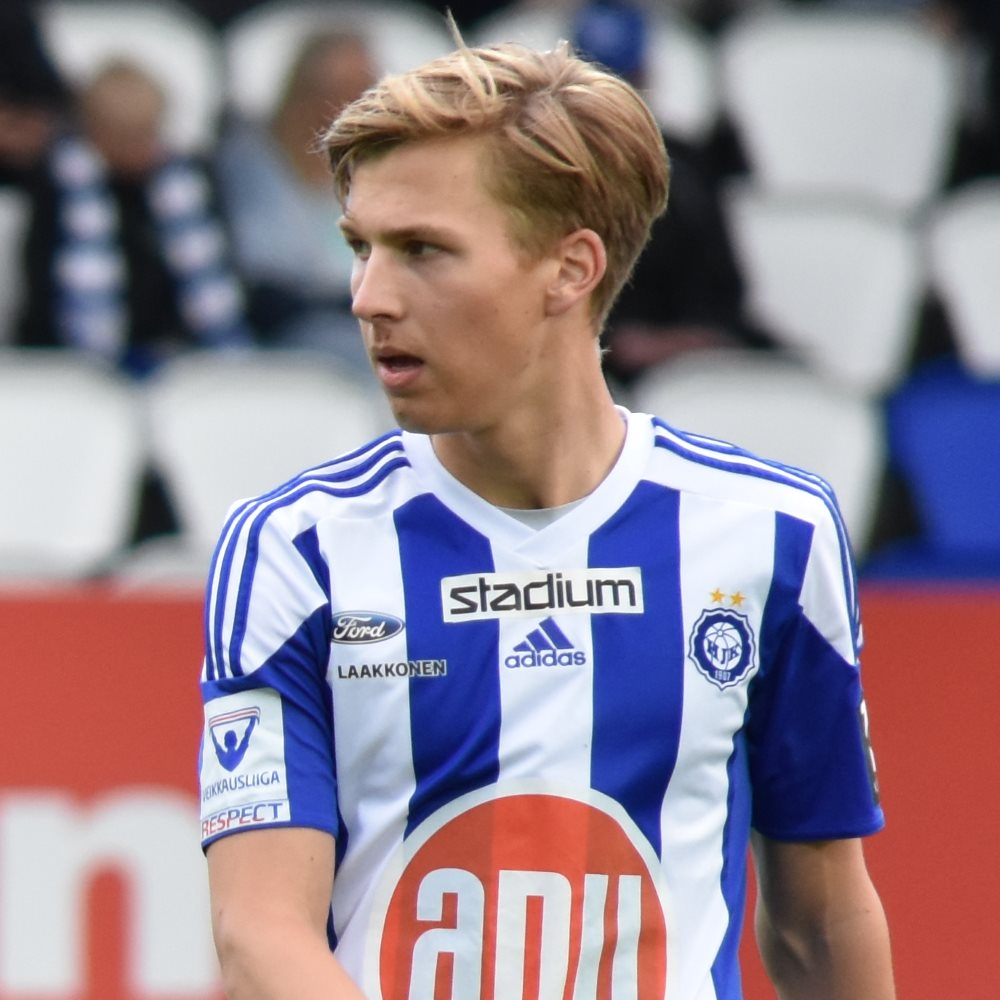
Lingman with HJK Helsinki in 2017

Lingman began his career as a youth with Honka before joining HJK in 2011. He was promoted to the first team in 2015, and made his Veikkausliiga debut on 30 August 2015 against FC Ilves at the age of 17.

=== RoPS ===
2018 Lingman signed 1+2 year(s) contract (with the team having the right to extend it) with Rovaniemen Palloseura.

=== HJK ===
On 28 October 2019, HJK announced the signing of Lingman on a two-year contract, with the option of an additional year. HJK paid RoPS a transfer fee of €150,000.

=== Helsingborg ===
On 18 January 2022, he signed with Helsingborgs IF in Sweden on a four-year deal, for a reported fee of €400,000.

HJK (loan)
Lingman returned to HJK in the 2022 summer transfer window, signing a loan deal until the end of 2022 season. In January 2023, his loan deal with HJK was extended for the 2023 season.

=== Return to HJK ===
On 4 January 2024, HJK acquired Lingman on a permanent contract, signing a three-year deal with him, for an undisclosed fee. Lingman became the first player in HJK's history to be bought back twice after leaving the club.

== Personal life ==
His father Tommi Lingman is a football coach.

== Career statistics ==
=== Club ===
As of 17 July 2025

Appearances and goals by club, season and competition
Club	Season	League			National cup (Note: Includes Suomen Cup)		League cup		Europe		Total	
Club	Season	Division	Apps	Goals	Apps	Goals	Apps	Goals	Apps	Goals	Apps	Goals
Klubi 04	2014	Kakkonen	18	1	1	0	—		—		19	1
Klubi 04	2015	Kakkonen	18	3	—		—		—		18	3
Klubi 04	2016	Kakkonen	8	1	—		—		—		8	1
Klubi 04	2017	Kakkonen	3	0	—		—		—		3	0
Klubi 04	Total		47	5	1	0	0	0	0	0	48	5
HJK	2015	Veikkausliiga	4	0	2	0	3	0	1 (Note: Appearances in UEFA Europa League)	0	10	0
HJK	2016	Veikkausliiga	6	0	2	0	4	0	0	0	12	0
HJK	2017	Veikkausliiga	11	1	1	0	—		1	0	13	1
HJK	Total		21	1	5	0	7	0	2	0	35	1
RoPS	2018	Veikkausliiga	32	5	5	1	—		—		37	6
RoPS	2019	Veikkausliiga	26	3	7	0	—		2	0	35	3
RoPS	Total		58	8	12	1	0	0	2	0	72	9
HJK	2020	Veikkausliiga	20	2	9	0	—		—		29	2
HJK	2021	Veikkausliiga	21	2	6	0	—		11 (Note: Appearances in UEFA Champions League, UEFA Europa League and UEFA Europa Conference League)	0	38	2
HJK	Total		41	4	15	0	0	0	11	0	67	4
Helsingborgs IF	2022	Allsvenskan	15	0	0	0	—		—		15	0
HJK (loan)	2022	Veikkausliiga	7	0	—		—		10	0	17	0
HJK (loan)	2023	Veikkausliiga	20	0	1	0	2	0	13	0	36	0
HJK (loan)	Total		27	0	1	0	2	0	23	0	53	0
HJK	2024	Veikkausliiga	22	4	1	0	3	0	10 (Note: Appearances in UEFA Champions League and UEFA Conference League)	0	36	4
HJK	2025	Veikkausliiga	13	0	3	0	4	1	2 (Note: Appearances in UEFA Conference League)	1	22	2
HJK	Total		35	4	4	0	7	1	12	1	58	6
Career total			244	22	38	1	16	1	50	1	348	24

=== International ===
As of match played 20 November 2023

Appearances and goals by national team and year
National team	Year	Apps	Goals
Finland	2022	7	0
Finland	2023	4	0
Total		11	0

== Honours ==
HJK Helsinki

- Veikkausliiga: 2017, 2020, 2021, 2022, 2023
- Veikkausliiga runner-up: 2016
- Finnish Cup: 2017, 2020, 2025
- Finnish Cup runner-up: 2021
- Finnish League Cup: 2015, 2023

RoPS

- Veikkausliiga runner-up: 2018
