= Ozan Kökçü =

Azerbaijani footballer (born 1998)

Personal information
- Full name: Ozan Can Kökçü
- Date of birth: 18 August 1998 (age 28)
- Place of birth: Haarlem, Netherlands
- Height: 1.76 m (5 ft 9 in)
- Position: Midfielder

Team information
- Current team: Vanspor

Youth career
- 2007–2011: Stormvogels
- 2011–2016: Groningen
- 2016–2017: Feyenoord

Senior career*
Years	Team	Apps	(Gls)
2017–2018	Bursaspor	0	(0)
2018	→ RKC Waalwijk (loan)	14	(1)
2018–2019	Giresunspor	14	(0)
2019–2021	Sabah	27	(1)
2021	→ Telstar (loan)	18	(2)
2021–2022	Telstar	29	(2)
2022–2024	Eindhoven	74	(18)
2024–2025	HJK	10	(0)
2025–2026	Volendam	28	(1)
2026–	Vanspor	0	(0)

International career^{‡}
2018	Azerbaijan U20	3	(0)
2017–2020	Azerbaijan U21	17	(2)
2022–	Azerbaijan	14	(0)
- * Club domestic league appearances and goals as of 30 May 2026 ‡ National team caps and goals as of 5 September 2025

Ozan Can Kökçü (born 18 August 1998) is a professional footballer who plays as a midfielder for Turkish TFF 1. Lig club Vanspor. Born in the Netherlands, he plays for the Azerbaijan national team.

== Club career ==
=== Bursaspor ===
On 29 March 2017, Ozan Kökçü signed a four-year contract with Bursaspor. Kökçü made his debut for Bursaspor in the Turkish Cup match against Yeni Altındağ Belediyespor in a 0–0 away draw on 26 October 2017.

==== Loan to Waalwijk ====
On 28 December 2017, RKC Waalwijk announced the signing of Ozan Kökçü on a season-long loan deal. He made his Eerste Divisie debut for Waalwijk in a 1–0 home victory against Jong AZ on 12 January 2018. He scored his first goal for the club on 6 April 2018, in the 4th minute of a 3–1 loss against Oss. Kökçü scored 1 goals and 3 assists in 14 matches during the 2017–18 season.

=== Giresunspor ===
On 2 August 2018, Kökçü signed a three-year contract with TFF First League side Giresunspor.

He made his league debut for Giresunspor in a 3–1 home victory against Eskişehirspor on 12 August 2018.

=== Sabah ===
On 21 August 2019, Kökçü signed a two-year contract with Azerbaijan Premier League side Sabah. On 13 January 2021, he was sent on a six-month loan to Telstar in the Dutch second-tier Eerste Divisie.

=== Telstar ===
In August 2021, Kökçü signed a two-year permanent deal with Telstar.

=== Eindhoven ===
Kökçü joined Eindhoven on 6 August 2022, signing a two-year contract with an option for an additional year.

=== HJK Helsinki ===
On 31 July 2024, Finnish Veikkausliiga club HJK Helsinki announced the signing of Kökçü on a deal until the end of 2026 for an undisclosed fee.

== International career ==
Kökçü was called up and played for the Azerbaijan U21 in a 2019 UEFA European Under-21 Championship qualification match against the Israel U21 on 31 August 2017.

== Personal life ==
Kökçü is of Turkish descent. He is the older brother of professional footballer Orkun Kökçü, who plays for Beşiktaş and is an international footballer for Turkey.

In January 2021, Kökçü married his long-term girlfriend Sevil in the Netherlands.

== Career statistics ==
As of 3 May 2025

Appearances and goals by club, season and competition
Club	Season	League			National cup (Note: Includes Turkish Cup, Azerbaijan Cup and KNVB Cup)		League cup (Note: Includes Finnish League Cup)		Europe		Total	
Club	Season	Division	Apps	Goals	Apps	Goals	Apps	Goals	Apps	Goals	Apps	Goals
Bursaspor	2017–18	Süper Lig	0	0	2	0	—		—		2	0
RKC Waalwijk (loan)	2017–18	Eerste Divisie	14	1	0	0	—		—		14	1
Giresunspor	2018–19	TFF 1. Lig	14	0	2	0	—		—		16	0
Sabah	2019–20	Azerbaijan Premier League	15	1	2	0	—		—		17	1
Sabah	2020–21	Azerbaijan Premier League	12	0	0	0	—		—		12	0
Sabah	Total		27	1	2	0	–		–		29	1
Telstar (loan)	2020–21	Eerste Divisie	18	2	0	0	—		—		18	2
Telstar	2021–22	Eerste Divisie	29	2	3	0	—		—		32	2
Telstar	Total		47	4	3	0	–		–		50	4
Eindhoven	2022–23	Eerste Divisie	36	6	2	1	—		—		38	7
Eindhoven	2023–24	Eerste Divisie	38	12	2	0	—		—		40	12
Eindhoven	Total		74	18	4	1	–		–		78	19
HJK	2024	Veikkausliiga	8	0	0	0	0	0	10 (Note: Appearances in UEFA Conference League)	0	18	0
HJK	2025	Veikkausliiga	2	0	0	0	6	1	0	0	8	1
HJK	Total		10	0	0	0	6	1	10	0	26	1
Career total			186	24	13	1	6	1	10	0	215	26
