= Thijmen Nijhuis =

Dutch footballer (born 1998)

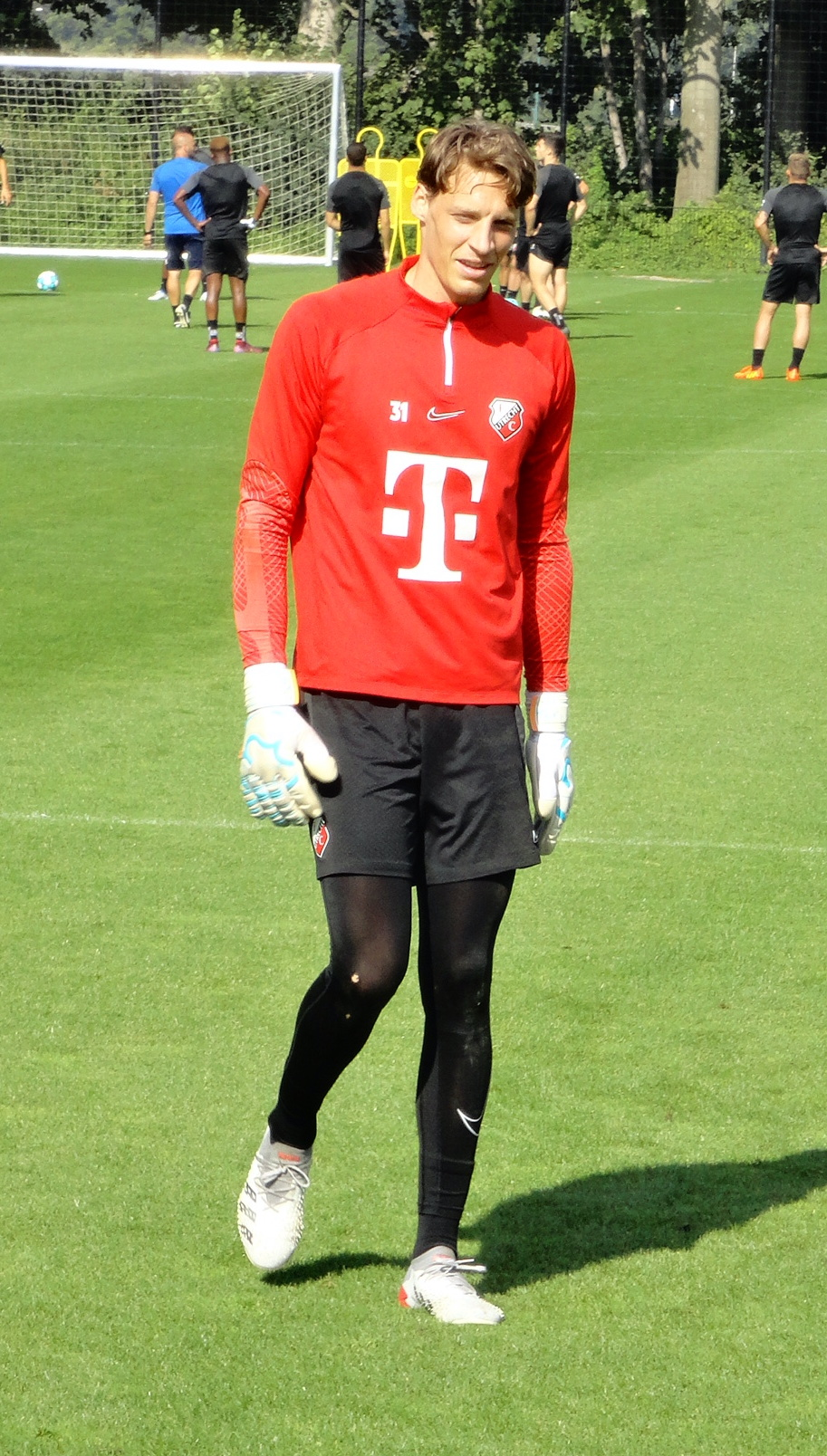
- Nijhuis with Utrecht in 2022

Personal information
- Full name: Thijmen Joel Sander Nijhuis
- Date of birth: 25 July 1998 (age 28)
- Place of birth: Wierden, Netherlands
- Height: 1.96 m (6 ft 5 in)
- Position: Goalkeeper

Team information
- Current team: Waldhof Mannheim
- Number: 1

Youth career
- IJFC
- USV Elinkwijk
- 2009–2016: Utrecht

Senior career*
Years	Team	Apps	(Gls)
2016–2023	Jong Utrecht	94	(0)
2017–2023	Utrecht	3	(0)
2021–2022	→ MVV Maastricht (loan)	12	(0)
2024	Utrecht	0	(0)
2024–2025	HJK	21	(0)
2025–	Waldhof Mannheim	34	(0)
- * Club domestic league appearances and goals as of 29 May 2026

Thijmen Joel Sander Nijhuis (born 25 July 1998) is a Dutch professional football player who plays as a goalkeeper for German 3. Liga club Waldhof Mannheim.

== Club career ==
He made his professional debut in the Eerste Divisie for Jong FC Utrecht on 5 August 2016 in a game against NAC Breda.

On 15 July 2021, he extended his contract with Utrecht until 2023 and was loaned to MVV for the 2021–22 season. The loan was terminated early on 14 January 2022, and Nijhuis was assigned to Jong FC Utrecht. He left Utrecht at the end of the 2022–23 season. He returned to the club in January 2024.

In July 2024, Nijhuis signed for Finnish Veikkausliiga club HJK on an initial 1,5 year contract with the option for a further year.

On 8 August 2025, Nijhuis moved to Waldhof Mannheim in German 3. Liga.

== Career statistics ==
As of 4 June 2025

Appearances and goals by club, season and competition
Club	Season	League			Cup (Note: Includes KNVB Cup)		League cup (Note: Includes Finnish League Cup)		Europe		Total	
Club	Season	Division	Apps	Goals	Apps	Goals	Apps	Goals	Apps	Goals	Apps	Goals
Jong Utrecht	2016–17	Eerste Divisie	16	0	–		–		–		16	0
Jong Utrecht	2017–18	Eerste Divisie	22	0	–		–		–		22	0
Jong Utrecht	2018–19	Eerste Divisie	24	0	–		–		–		24	0
Jong Utrecht	2019–20	Eerste Divisie	2	0	–		–		–		2	0
Jong Utrecht	2020–21	Eerste Divisie	13	0	–		–		–		13	0
Jong Utrecht	2021–22	Eerste Divisie	10	0	–		–		–		10	0
Jong Utrecht	2022–23	Eerste Divisie	6	0	–		–		–		6	0
Jong Utrecht	2023–24	Eerste Divisie	1	0	–		–		–		1	0
Jong Utrecht	Total		94	0	0	0	0	0	0	0	94	0
Utrecht	2020–21	Eredivisie	3	0	1	0	–		–		4	0
MVV Maastricht (loan)	2021–22	Eerste Divisie	12	0	0	0	–		–		12	0
HJK Helsinki	2024	Veikkausliiga	5	0	–		–		10 (Note: Appearances in UEFA Conference League)	0	15	0
HJK Helsinki	2025	Veikkausliiga	16	0	1	0	2	0	4	0	23	0
HJK Helsinki	Total		21	0	1	0	2	0	14	0	38	0
Waldhof Mannheim	2025–26	3. Liga	0	0	0	0	–		–		0	0
Career total			130	0	2	0	2	0	14	0	148	0
