= Aaro Toivonen =

Finnish footballer (born 2005)

Personal information
- Full name: Aaro Emil Toivonen
- Date of birth: 19 April 2005 (age 21)
- Place of birth: Finland
- Height: 1.75 m (5 ft 9 in)
- Position: Midfielder

Team information
- Current team: KuPS
- Number: 28

Youth career
- Kasiysi
- –2019: Espoo
- 2020–2022: HJK

Senior career*
Years	Team	Apps	(Gls)
2022–2025	Klubi 04	49	(8)
2022–2025	HJK	7	(0)
2024	→ Tallinna Kalev (loan)	13	(2)
2025	KTP	12	(0)
2026–	KuPS	0	(0)
2026–	KuPS Akatemia	1	(0)

International career^{‡}
2019	Finland U15	3	(0)
2021–2022	Finland U17	9	(0)
2022–2023	Finland U18	4	(0)
2023–	Finland U19	5	(1)
Medal record
Finland U18
First place	Baltic Cup	2023
- * Club domestic league appearances and goals as of 12 November 2026 ‡ National team caps and goals as of 6 December 2023

Aaro Emil Toivonen (born 19 April 2005) is a Finnish professional footballer who plays as a midfielder for Veikkausliiga club KuPS.

== Career ==
Toivonen joined HJK youth academy in 2020 from FC Espoo.

He made his Veikkausliiga debut with HJK on 30 July 2022 aged 17, in a 1–0 home win against IFK Mariehamn. On 31 August 2022, his deal was extended until the end of 2024. On 3 August 2023, he extended his contract again, until the end of 2025.

Toivonen was part of the HJK Youth squad in the 2023–24 UEFA Youth League campaign, playing in all four matches, against Malmö FF youth and Nantes youth.

On 7 August 2024, Toivonen was loaned out to Meistriliiga club Tallinna Kalev for the rest of the season.

== International career ==
Toivonen was named in the Finland U17 squad for the 2022 UEFA European Under-17 Championship qualification tournament in October 2021, against Bosnia-Herzegovina, Switzerland and Gibraltar, providing an assist in three games in total. Finland finished 2nd in the group and advanced to the Elite round. In March 2022, Toivonen was also named in the Finland U17 squad in the Elite round matches against Portugal, Bulgaria and Ireland.

Toivonen was part of the Finland U18 squad winning the friendly tournament Baltic Cup in June 2023.

In October 2023, Toivonen was named in Finland U19 squad in the 2024 UEFA European Under-19 Championship qualification tournament, scoring one goal in three games, against Romania, Czech Republic and San Marino.

== Career statistics ==
As of 12 November 2026

Appearances and goals by club, season and competition
Club	Season	League			Cup (Note: Includes Suomen Cup and Estonian Cup)		League cup (Note: Includes Finnish League Cup and Ykkösliigacup)		Continental		Total	
Club	Season	Division	Apps	Goals	Apps	Goals	Apps	Goals	Apps	Goals	Apps	Goals
Klubi 04	2022	Kakkonen	20	5	2	1	—		—		22	6
Klubi 04	2023	Kakkonen	18	2	0	0	—		—		18	2
Klubi 04	2024	Ykkönen	2	1	—		—		—		2	1
Klubi 04	2025	Ykkösliiga	9	0	1	0	1	0	–		11	0
Klubi 04	Total		49	8	3	1	1	0	0	0	53	9
HJK	2022	Veikkausliiga	1	0	0	0	0	0	0	0	1	0
HJK	2023	Veikkausliiga	1	0	0	0	0	0	0 (Note: Appearance(s) in UEFA Champions League)	0	1	0
HJK	2024	Veikkausliiga	5	0	1	0	2	0	0	0	8	0
HJK	2025	Veikkausliiga	0	0	0	0	1	0	0	0	1	0
HJK	Total		7	0	1	0	3	0	0	0	11	0
Tallinna Kalev (loan)	2024	Meistriliiga	13	2	1	2	–		0	0	14	4
Tallinna Kalev II (loan)	2024	Esiliiga	1	0	–		–		–		1	0
KTP	2025	Veikkausliiga	14	0	0	0	0	0	–		14	0
Career total			83	10	5	3	4	0	0	0	92	13

== Honours ==
HJK

- Veikkausliiga: 2022, 2023

Finland U18

- Baltic Cup: 2023
