= Georgios Antzoulas =

Greek footballer (born 2000)

Personal information
- Date of birth: 4 February 2000 (age 26)
- Place of birth: Tripoli, Greece
- Height: 1.88 m (6 ft 2 in)
- Position: Centre-back

Team information
- Current team: FC Ingolstadt
- Number: 6

Youth career
- 2008–2014: Patraikos
- 2014–2018: Asteras Tripolis
- 2018–2019: Fiorentina

Senior career*
Years	Team	Apps	(Gls)
2018–2023	Asteras Tripolis	19	(0)
2018–2019	→ Fiorentina (loan)	0	(0)
2021	→ Cosenza (loan)	5	(0)
2023–2024	Újpest	37	(2)
2024–2025	HJK	31	(3)
2026–	FC Ingolstadt	16	(0)

International career^{‡}
2016–2017	Greece U17	13	(0)
2018	Greece U18	2	(0)
2017–2019	Greece U19	11	(1)
2019–2022	Greece U21	9	(0)
- * Club domestic league appearances and goals as of 29 May 2026 ‡ National team caps and goals as of 11 June 2022

Georgios Antzoulas (Greek: Γεώργιος Αντζουλάς; born 4 February 2000) is a Greek professional footballer who plays as a centre-back for German 3. Liga club FC Ingolstadt.

== Career ==
=== Asteras Tripolis ===
On 11 January 2018, Antzoulas made his professional debut in Greek Cup against Atromitos, while displaying his obvious talent in the U17 and U19 Super Leagues.

==== Fiorentina (loan) ====
On 28 July 2018, Antzoulas was loaned to Fiorentina, with a purchase option of €2 million for the summer of 2019. He has enjoyed a successful season with Fiorentina, winning the Coppa Italia Primavera and receiving a call-up to the senior squad, for three Serie A matches against Napoli in February and Milan, Parma in May. Antzoulas sat on the bench in all of those games. Interestingly, in the event Antzoulas made an appearance for the Fiorentina first team, his release clause of €2 million from Asteras Tripolis would be automatically activated.

==== Cosenza (loan) ====
On 1 February 2021, he returned to Italy on loan to Cosenza.

On 5 July 2021, Asteras Tripolis announced the extension of his contract until 2024.

=== HJK Helsinki ===
After spending two seasons with Újpest in Hungary, on 18 July 2024, Antzoulas signed with HJK Helsinki in Finnish Veikkausliiga on a deal until the end of 2025. He scored his first goal in the league on 24 May 2025, in a 4–0 away win over IFK Mariehamn.

=== Ingolstadt ===
On 22 December 2025, Antzoulas signed with German 3. Liga club FC Ingolstadt.

== Career statistics ==
As of 6 April 2026

Appearances and goals by club, season and competition
Club	Season	League			National cup (Note: Includes Greek Cup, Hungarian Cup and Suomen Cup)		League cup (Note: Includes Finnish League Cup)		Europe		Total	
Club	Season	Division	Apps	Goals	Apps	Goals	Apps	Goals	Apps	Goals	Apps	Goals
Asteras Tripolis	2017–18	Super League Greece	0	0	1	0	–		–		1	0
Asteras Tripolis	2018–19	Super League Greece	0	0	0	0	–		–		0	0
Asteras Tripolis	2019–20	Super League Greece	10	0	2	0	–		–		12	0
Asteras Tripolis	2020–21	Super League Greece	1	0	0	0	–		–		1	0
Asteras Tripolis	2021–22	Super League Greece	7	0	0	0	–		–		7	0
Asteras Tripolis	2022–23	Super League Greece	1	0	0	0	–		–		1	0
Asteras Tripolis	Total		19	0	3	0	0	0	0	0	22	0
Fiorentina (loan)	2018–19	Serie A	0	0	0	0	–		–		0	0
Cosenza (loan)	2020–21	Serie B	5	0	0	0	–		–		5	0
Újpest	2022–23	NB I	13	1	0	0	–		–		13	1
Újpest	2023–24	NB I	24	1	1	0	–		–		25	1
Újpest	Total		37	2	1	0	0	0	0	0	38	2
HJK	2024	Veikkausliiga	7	0	0	0	0	0	8 (Note: Appearance(s) in UEFA Conference League)	0	15	0
HJK	2025	Veikkausliiga	24	3	3	0	4	0	4	1	35	4
HJK	Total		31	3	3	0	4	0	12	1	50	4
FC Ingolstadt	2025–26	3. Liga	9	0	0	0	–		–		9	0
Career total			101	5	7	0	4	0	12	1	124	6

== Honours ==
HJK

- Finnish Cup: 2025

Fiorentina U19

- Coppa Italia Primavera: 2018–19
