= Pontus Lindgren =

Swedish footballer (born 2000)

Personal information
- Full name: Pontus Karl Algot Lindgren
- Date of birth: 13 December 2000 (age 25)
- Place of birth: Sweden
- Position: Centre back

Team information
- Current team: Strømmen IF
- Number: 25

Youth career
- –2016: Smedby AIS
- 2017–2020: IFK Norrköping

Senior career*
Years	Team	Apps	(Gls)
2020	IFK Norrköping	0	(0)
2020	→ Sylvia (loan)	5	(1)
2020	→ Eneby (loan)	9	(1)
2021–2022	Sylvia	25	(1)
2022–2023	KR	16	(0)
2023	→ ÍA (loan)	15	(0)
2024	GIF Sundsvall	20	(0)
2025–2026	IFK Mariehamn	28	(0)
2026–	Strømmen IF	10	(0)

International career
	Sweden U16	4	(0)
- * Club domestic league appearances and goals as of 14 November 2026

Pontus Karl Algot Lindgren (born 13 December 2000) is a Swedish professional footballer who plays as a centre back for Norwegian side Strømmen IF.

== Club career ==
After playing in Iceland for KR and ÍA, Lindberg returned to Sweden and signed with Superettan club GIF Sundsvall for the 2024 season.

In January 2025, he moved to Finland and signed with Veikkausliiga club IFK Mariehamn.

== Career statistics ==
As of 14 November 2026

Appearances and goals by club, season and competition
Club	Season	League			National cup (Note: Includes Svenska Cupen, Icelandic Cup and Suomen Cup)		League cup (Note: Includes Icelandic League Cup and Finnish League Cup)		Europe		Total	
Club	Season	Division	Apps	Goals	Apps	Goals	Apps	Goals	Apps	Goals	Apps	Goals
IFK Norrköping	2010	Allsvenskan	0	0	0	0	–		–		0	0
Sylvia (loan)	2020	Ettan	5	1	–		–		–		5	1
Eneby (loan)	2020	Swedish Division 3	9	1	–		–		–		9	1
Sylvia	2021	Ettan	24	1	3	0	–		–		27	1
Sylvia	2022	Ettan	1	0	0	0	–		–		1	0
Sylvia	Total		25	1	3	0	0	0	0	0	28	1
KR	2022	Besta deild karla	16	0	2	0	0	0	2 (Note: Appearances in UEFA Conference League)	0	20	0
KR	2023	Besta deild karla	0	0	0	0	1	0	0	0	1	0
KR	Total		16	0	2	0	1	0	2	0	21	0
ÍA (loan)	2023	1. deild karla	15	0	1	0	–		–		16	0
GIF Sundsvall	2024	Superettan	20	0	4	0	–		–		24	0
IFK Mariehamn	2025	Veikkausliiga	20	0	1	0	5	1	–		26	1
IFK Mariehamn	2026	Veikkausliiga	8	0	2	0	5	0	–		15	0
IFK Mariehamn	Total		28	0	3	0	10	1	0	0	41	1
Strømmen IF	2026	Norwegian First Division	10	0	1	0	–		–		11	0
Career total			128	3	14	0	11	1	2	0	155	4

== Honours ==
ÍA

- 1. deild karla: 2023
