= Hadi Noori =

Swedish footballer (born 2004)

Personal information
- Birth name: Hadi Nori هادی نوری
- Date of birth: 20 April 2004 (age 22)
- Place of birth: Sweden
- Height: 1.83 m (6 ft 0 in)
- Position: Midfielder

Team information
- Current team: Enköpings SK
- Number: 10

Youth career
- –2019: IF VP Uppsala
- 2019–2023: AIK

Senior career*
Years	Team	Apps	(Gls)
2023–2025	Klubi 04	30	(2)
2024	→ AFC Eskilstuna (loan)	20	(1)
2025	IFK Haninge	0	(0)
2026–	Enköpings SK	29	(13)
- * Club domestic league appearances and goals as of 16 November 2026

Hadi Noori is a Swedish professional footballer who plays as a midfielder for Enköpings SK.

== Club career ==
On 4 May 2023, Noori left AIK and signed with HJK Helsinki organisation on a three-year deal, and was first registered to the club's reserve team Klubi 04.

On 2 February 2024, he was loaned out to Swedish club AFC Eskilstuna for the 2024 season.

== Personal life ==
Born in Sweden, Noori is of Afghan descent.
