= Joonas Kekarainen =

Finnish footballer (born 2005)

Personal information
- Date of birth: 3 May 2005 (age 21)
- Place of birth: Finland
- Height: 1.86 m (6 ft 1 in)
- Position: Attacking midfielder

Team information
- Current team: Pors
- Number: 31

Youth career
- 2012–2022: KäPa

Senior career*
Years	Team	Apps	(Gls)
2022–2023	KäPa	51	(8)
2024–2025	Inter Turku II	9	(3)
2024–2025	Inter Turku	46	(5)
2026	SJK	3	(0)
2026	SJK Akatemia	7	(0)
2026–	Pors	8	(0)

International career^{‡}
2021–2022	Finland U17	9	(1)
2022–2023	Finland U18	11	(0)
2023–	Finland U19	5	(0)
Medal record
Finland U18
First place	Baltic Cup	2023
- * Club domestic league appearances and goals as of 15 November 2026 ‡ National team caps and goals as of 30 October 2023

Joonas Kekarainen (born 3 May 2005) is a Finnish professional football midfielder for Norwegian Second Division side Pors. He had previously played for the Finland U19 national team.

== Club career ==
=== Käpylän Pallo ===
Kekarainen is a product of the renowned Käpylän Pallo youth academy.

He made his senior debut with the club in the third-tier Kakkonen in 2022. In the end of the season, KäPa gained a promotion to the second-tier Ykkönen, and Kekarainen stayed with the team. After the 2023 Ykkönen season, KäPa announced that Kekarainen would depart the club, after having represented KäPa for over 10 years.

=== Inter Turku ===
On 1 November 2023, FC Inter Turku in Veikkausliiga announced that they had signed with Kekarainen on a two-year deal, with an option for an additional year. He debuted with his new club on 27 January 2024, in a Finnish League Cup win against FC Lahti. Kekarainen scored his first league goal on 27 May 2024, in a 3–1 away loss against Vaasan Palloseura (VPS).

== International career ==
A regular Finnish youth international, Kekarainen has represented Finland at under-17, under-18 and under-19 youth national team levels.

Kekarainen was part of the Finland U18 squad winning the friendly tournament Baltic Cup in June 2023.

In October 2023, Kekarainen was part of the Finland U19 squad in the 2024 UEFA European Under-19 Championship qualification tournament, in three games against Romania, Czech Republic and San Marino.

== Career statistics ==
As of 15 November 2026

Appearances and goals by club, season and competition
Club	Season	League			Cup (Note: Includes Suomen Cup)		League cup (Note: Includes Ykkönen Cup and Finnish League Cup)		Europe		Total	
Club	Season	Division	Apps	Goals	Apps	Goals	Apps	Goals	Apps	Goals	Apps	Goals
KäPa	2022	Kakkonen	25	6	0	0	—		—		25	6
KäPa	2023	Ykkönen	26	2	2	2	4	2	—		32	6
KäPa	Total		51	8	2	2	4	2	0	0	57	12
Inter Turku II	2024	Kakkonen	7	3	—		—		—		7	3
Inter Turku II	2025	Kakkonen	2	0	—		—		—		2	0
Inter Turku II	Total		9	3	0	0	0	0	0	0	9	3
Inter Turku	2024	Veikkausliiga	20	3	5	1	6	0	—		31	4
Inter Turku	2025	Veikkausliiga	26	2	2	1	6	2	–		34	5
Inter Turku	Total		46	5	7	2	12	2	0	0	65	9
SJK	2026	Veikkausliiga	3	0	3	1	5	0	—		11	1
SJK Akatemia	2026	Ykkösliiga	7	0	0	0	0	0	—		7	0
Pors	2026	Norwegian Second Division	8	0	2	0	–		—		10	0
Career total			124	16	14	3	21	4	0	0	159	25

== Honours ==
KäPa

- Kakkonen, Promotion Group A: 2022

Inter Turku

- Finnish Cup runner-up: 2024
- Finnish League Cup: 2024, 2025
