= Salem Bouajila =

Tunisian-Finnish footballer (born 2007)

Personal information
- Full name: Salem Mounir Bouajila
- Date of birth: 1 August 2007 (age 19)
- Place of birth: Helsinki, Finland
- Height: 1.95 m (6 ft 5 in)
- Position: Centre-forward

Team information
- Current team: Muğlaspor (on loan from Göztepe)
- Number: 26

Youth career
- 2016–2025: HJK

Senior career*
Years	Team	Apps	(Gls)
2025–2026	Klubi 04	2	(0)
2025–2026	HJK	0	(0)
2025	→ SV Ried II (loan)	13	(3)
2025–2026	→ Göztepe (loan)	4	(0)
2026–	Göztepe	0	(0)
2026–	→ Muğlaspor (loan)	3	(0)

International career
2024	Finland U17	2	(0)
2025	Tunisia U23	2	(1)
- * Club domestic league appearances and goals as of 15 October 2026

Salem Mounir Bouajila (born 1 August 2007) is a professional footballer who plays as a centre-forward for Turkish TFF 1. Lig club Muğlaspor on loan from Göztepe. Born in Finland, Bouajila has represented his native country and Tunisia at youth international levels.
