= Mohammad Al-Emara =

Finnish football referee (born 1992)

- Born: 26 February 1992 (age 34); Rafha, Saudi Arabia
- Other occupation: Interpreter

Domestic
| Years | League | Role |
| 2017– | Veikkausliiga | Referee |

International
| Years | League | Role |
| 2021– | FIFA listed | Referee |

Mohammad Al-Emara (born 26 February 1992) is a Finnish FIFA-listed football referee. He has been named the Veikkausliiga Referee of the Year in six consecutive seasons (2018–2023), voted by the league players. Since 2025, Al-Emara is a UEFA First Category referee. Currently he resides in Helsinki.

== Early life ==
Al-Emara's parents are from Southern Iraq, and were forced to flee the country in 1991. They ended up in a refugee camp in Rafha, Saudi-Arabia, where Al-Emara was born the following year. He moved with his family to Kuopio, Finland in 1994 at an early age, where he started playing football when aged five. After the family had relocated to Turku, Finland, Al-Emara continued football in the youth sectors of Turun Nappulaliiga (TuNL) and FC Inter Turku. Later the family moved to Varissuo neighbourhood in Turku. Al-Emara was part of the Inter Turku U17 team, winning the Finnish U17 championship. He also played in the third-tier level Kakkonen, before ending his playing career in 2011.

== Career ==
=== Domestic ===
Al-Emara started refereeing in 2012, and two years later he refereed in Kakkonen. He moved on to second-tier Ykkönen in 2016. On 26 August 2017, he debuted in Veikkausliiga in a match between SJK and JJK. In the 2018 Ykkönen season, in a match between Haka and KTP in Tehtaan kenttä, Valkeakoski, Al-Emara temporarily suspended the match and ordered the teams to locker rooms for 10 minutes, after a spectator had been using racial slurs and offensive language on a player repeatedly, of which they were warned first. Later the spectator was escorted out of the stadium, and the match was able to continue.

As of the start of the 2024 season, Al-Emara has refereed 102 Veikkausliiga matches.

=== International ===
Since 2021, Al-Emara is a FIFA-listed international referee. On 6 June 2021, he was named the 4th official in an international friendly match between Denmark and Bosnia and Herzegovina. In September 2023, Al-Emara officiated in the 2023–24 UEFA Youth League. On 9 November 2023, Al-Emara was named the referee in the 2023–24 UEFA Europa Conference League (UECL) group stage match between Nordsjælland and Spartak Trnava. On 30 November 2023, he was also named the referee in UECL group stage match between Čukarički and Ferencváros.

== Personal life ==
Al-Emara is an interpreter by profession.

He has actively been speaking about racism and inequality in football and in society, and for the safety and respect for the referees. He was awarded Mielenterveyspalkinto (eng. Mental health prize) by MIELI Ry in 2023, for his work against racism.

Al-Emara received an invitation from the President of Finland Sauli Niinistö for the Finland's Independence Day Reception in 2023.

In August 2024, Al-Emara stopped a game between AC Oulu and FC Inter Turku at the Raatti Stadium following racist shouts from the crowd. He was later seen having a heated argument with representatives of the local AC Oulu team, who said that it was a challenge to identify a person in the crowd, but that the fan who had insulted Al-Emara had been identified and that they would face consequences, adding that the club has "zero tolerance" for racism.

== Honours ==
=== Individual ===
- Veikkausliiga: Referee of the Year 2018, 2019, 2020, 2021, 2022, 2023
- Finnish FA: Referee of the Year 2023
