= Eemil Toivonen =

Finnish footballer (born 2006)

Personal information
- Date of birth: 12 December 2006 (age 19)
- Place of birth: Finland
- Height: 1.76 m (5 ft 9 in)
- Position: Left back

Team information
- Current team: HJK
- Number: 35

Youth career
- –2018: MPS
- 2019–2023: HJK

Senior career*
Years	Team	Apps	(Gls)
2024	Klubi 04	26	(3)
2024–	HJK	0	(0)
2025	→ IFK Mariehamn (loan)	11	(1)

International career^{‡}
2023	Finland U17	2	(0)
2024	Finland U18	4	(0)
2024–	Finland U19	5	(0)
- * Club domestic league appearances and goals as of 12 November 2026 ‡ National team caps and goals as of 8 April 2025

Eemil Toivonen (born 12 December 2006) is a Finnish professional footballer who plays as a left back for Veikkausliiga club HJK Helsinki.

== Career ==
Toivonen played in the youth sector of MPS in Malmi, Helsinki until the end of 2018, when he joined the youth academy of HJK Helsinki. On 31 March 2025, he extended his contract with HJK and was loaned out to IFK Mariehamn for the 2025 Veikkausliiga season.

== Honours ==
Klubi 04

- Ykkönen: 2024
