= Oskari Väistö =

Finnish footballer (born 2005)

Personal information
- Date of birth: 15 September 2005 (age 21)
- Place of birth: Finland
- Position: Defender

Team information
- Current team: SJK
- Number: 5

Youth career
- –2022: SJK

Senior career*
Years	Team	Apps	(Gls)
2022–2023	SJK Akatemia II	7	(1)
2022–2025	SJK Akatemia	40	(3)
2023–	SJK	53	(1)

International career^{‡}
2021	Finland U17	2	(0)
2023	Finland U18	3	(0)
2023–2024	Finland U19	4	(0)
2025–	Finland U21	1	(0)
- * Club domestic league appearances and goals as of 13 November 2026 ‡ National team caps and goals as of 9 September 2025

Oskari Väistö (born 15 September 2005) is a Finnish professional footballer who plays as a defender for Veikkausliiga club SJK Seinäjoki.

== Club career ==
Väistö made his Veikkausliiga debut with SJK first team in 2023.

== International career ==
Väistö has represented Finland at under-17, under-18 and under-19 youth international levels.

He was part of the Finland U18 squad winning the friendly tournament Baltic Cup in June 2023.

In October 2023, Väistö was named in the Finland U19 squad in the 2024 UEFA European Under-19 Championship qualification tournament, and played in all three games against Romania, Czech Republic and San Marino.

== Personal life ==
Growing up, Väistö has played also pesäpallo, the Finnish baseball, in a youth team of Seinäjoen Maila-Jussit.
