= Riyad El Alami =

Finnish footballer (born 1998)

Personal information
- Date of birth: 28 February 1998 (age 28)
- Place of birth: Oujda, Morocco
- Height: 1.87 m (6 ft 2 in)
- Position: Defender

Senior career*
Years	Team	Apps	(Gls)
2018–2020	Espoo	32	(0)
2019	Espoo II	1	(0)
2021	EPS	5	(1)
2021	Reipas Lahti	5	(0)
2021	Lahti	6	(0)
- * Club domestic league appearances and goals as of 12:34, 6 January 2022 (UTC)

Riyad El Alami (born 28 February 1998) is a professional footballer who plays as a defender.

== Career statistics ==
=== Club ===
As of 6 January 2022.

Club	Season	League			Cup		Continental		Other		Total	
Club	Season	Division	Apps	Goals	Apps	Goals	Apps	Goals	Apps	Goals	Apps	Goals
Espoo	2018	Kakkonen	11	0	0	0	–		–		11	0
Espoo	2019	Kakkonen	18	0	0	0	–		4 (Note: Three appearances in the Kakkonen Cup, one appearance in the Kakkonen playoffs)	0	22	0
Espoo	2020	Kakkonen	3	0	0	0	–		–		3	0
Espoo	Total		32	0	0	0	0	0	4	0	36	0
Espoo II	2019	Kolmonen	1	0	–		–		–		1	0
EPS	2021	Kakkonen	5	1	–		–		–		5	1
Reipas Lahti	2021	Kakkonen	5	0	–		–		–		5	0
Lahti	2021	Veikkausliiga	6	0	0	0	–		–		6	0
Career total			49	1	0	0	0	0	4	0	53	1
