= Peiman Simani =

Finnish football referee

- Born: 5 June 1992 (age 34); Finland

Domestic
Years	League	Role
2021–	Veikkausliiga	Referee

International
Years	League	Role
2024–	FIFA listed	Referee

Peiman Simani (born 5 June 1992) is a Finnish international football referee. Since the start of the 2024 season, Simani is a FIFA-listed international referee.

== Career ==
At the end of the 2016 season, Simani was named the Referee of the Year by the Uusimaa district of Finnish FA.

Simani debuted in Veikkausliiga on 30 June 2021, in a match between Haka and Honka.

On 9 November 2023, Simani was named the fourth official in the 2023–24 UEFA Europa Conference League (UECL) group stage match between Nordsjælland and Spartak Trnava. On 30 November, Simani was also named the fourth official in the UECL group stage match between Čukarički and Ferencváros.

On 9 July 2025, it was announced that Simani would referee the 2025–26 UEFA Conference League first qualifying round match between Kauno Žalgiris and Penybont.
