= Niklas Friberg =

Finnish footballer (born 1996)

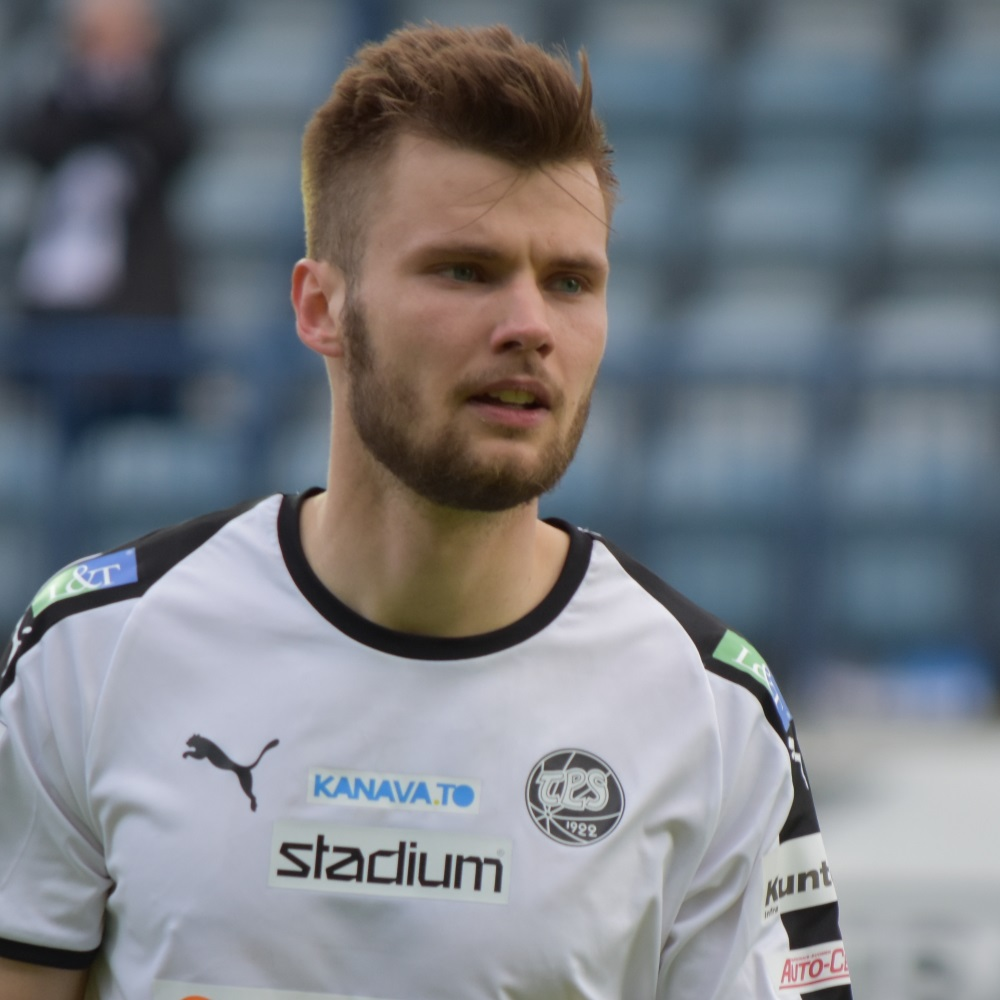
- Friberg with TPS in 2018.

Personal information
- Date of birth: 14 March 1996 (age 30)
- Place of birth: Halikko, Finland
- Height: 1.86 m (6 ft 1 in)
- Position: Defender

Team information
- Current team: Haka
- Number: 3

Senior career*
Years	Team	Apps	(Gls)
2011–2014	SalPa	41	(0)
2014	Inter Turku	0	(0)
2014	SalPa	13	(0)
2014–2018	TPS	92	(4)
2016	→ SalPa (loan)	2	(0)
2019–	Haka	183	(9)
- * Club domestic league appearances and goals as of 1 November 2026

Niklas Friberg (born 14 March 1996) is a Finnish professional footballer who plays as a defender for Ykkösliiga club Haka.

== Club career ==
On 18 December 2018, he agreed to join Haka for the 2019 season.

== Career statistics ==
As of 7 November 2026

Appearances and goals by club, season and competition
Club	Season	League			Cup (Note: Includes Suomen Cup)		League cup (Note: Includes Finnish League Cup)		Europe		Total	
Club	Season	Division	Apps	Goals	Apps	Goals	Apps	Goals	Apps	Goals	Apps	Goals
SalPa	2011	Kakkonen	1	0	–		–		–		1	0
SalPa	2012	Kakkonen	18	0	–		–		–		18	0
SalPa	2013	Kakkonen	22	0	–		–		–		22	0
SalPa	Total		41	0	0	0	0	0	0	0	41	0
Inter Turku	2014	Veikkausliiga	0	0	0	0	1	0	–		1	0
SalPa	2014	Kakkonen	13	0	1	0	–		–		14	0
TPS	2014	Veikkausliiga	11	0	–		–		–		11	0
TPS	2015	Ykkönen	22	2	3	0	–		–		25	2
TPS	2016	Ykkönen	19	2	2	0	–		–		21	2
TPS	2017	Ykkönen	20	0	2	0	–		–		22	0
TPS	2018	Veikkausliiga	22	0	5	0	–		–		27	0
TPS	Total		94	4	12	0	0	0	0	0	106	4
SalPa (loan)	2016	Kakkonen	2	0	–		–		–		2	0
Haka	2019	Ykkönen	25	4	5	0	–		–		30	4
Haka	2020	Veikkausliiga	19	1	8	0	–		–		27	1
Haka	2021	Veikkausliiga	24	1	3	0	–		–		27	1
Haka	2022	Veikkausliiga	27	0	3	0	5	0	–		35	0
Haka	2023	Veikkausliiga	24	1	1	0	5	0	2 (Note: Appearances in UEFA Europa Conference League)	0	32	1
Haka	2024	Veikkausliiga	19	1	5	1	5	0	–		29	2
Haka	2025	Veikkausliiga	25	0	1	0	3	0	–		29	0
Haka	2026	Ykkösliiga	20	1	0	0	2	0	–		22	1
Haka	Total		183	9	26	1	20	0	2	0	231	10
Career total			333	13	39	1	21	0	2	0	395	14
