= Pyry Mentu =

Finnish footballer (born 2006)

Personal information
- Date of birth: 1 November 2006 (age 20)
- Place of birth: Helsinki, Finland
- Height: 1.81 m (5 ft 11 in)
- Position: Midfielder

Team information
- Current team: HJK
- Number: 8

Youth career
- 2011–2023: HJK

Senior career*
Years	Team	Apps	(Gls)
2023–2024	Klubi 04	26	(4)
2024–	HJK	54	(3)

International career^{‡}
2021–2022	Finland U16	4	(0)
2023–2024	Finland U18	6	(0)
2024–2025	Finland U19	8	(2)
2025–	Finland U21	6	(1)
- * Club domestic league appearances and goals as of 12 November 2026 ‡ National team caps and goals as of 31 March 2026

Pyry Mentu (born 1 November 2006) is a Finnish professional footballer, playing as a central midfielder for HJK Helsinki.

== Career ==
=== HJK Helsinki ===
Mentu started football in a youth team of HJK Helsinki in Lauttasaari neighbourhood when he was five years old.

He debuted with the HJK first team in the Finnish League Cup in 2024. During the 2024 season, he mainly played for the club's reserve team Klubi 04 in third-tier Ykkönen, and also made one appearance for the first team in a Finnish Cup match against Ekenäs IF. In July 2024, he signed a three-and-a-half-year deal with HJK.

On 22 November 2024, Mentu made his first start for HJK, in a friendly match against Shamrock Rovers at the Tallaght Stadium, helping his side to a 2–0 win. Four days later, he was included in the match day line-up for a UEFA Conference League match against Panathinaikos on 28 November. He was substituted in on the 75th minute, replacing Liam Möller, in a 1–0 away defeat at the Athens Olympic Stadium.

After debuting in Veikkausliiga with HJK on 5 April 2025, three weeks later Mentu scored his first league goal, a winning goal in a 3–1 home win over VPS.

== Career statistics ==
As of 12 November 2026

Appearances and goals by club, season and competition
Club	Season	League			National cup (Note: Includes Suomen Cup)		League cup (Note: Includes Finnish League Cup)		Europe		Total	
Club	Season	Division	Apps	Goals	Apps	Goals	Apps	Goals	Apps	Goals	Apps	Goals
Klubi 04	2023	Kakkonen	0	0	–		–		–		0	0
Klubi 04	2024	Ykkönen	26	4	–		–		–		26	4
Klubi 04	Total		26	4	0	0	0	0	0	0	26	4
HJK	2024	Veikkausliiga	0	0	1	0	2	0	2 (Note: Appearance(s) in UEFA Conference League)	0	5	0
HJK	2025	Veikkausliiga	29	2	5	0	5	0	3	0	42	2
HJK	2026	Veikkausliiga	25	1	3	0	6	0	3	1	6	0
HJK	Total		54	3	9	0	13	0	8	1	53	2
Career total			80	7	9	0	13	0	8	1	110	8

== Honours ==
Klubi 04

- Ykkönen: 2024

HJK

- Finnish Cup: 2025
- Finnish League Cup runner-up: 2025
