= Georgios Kanellopoulos =

Greek footballer (born 2000)

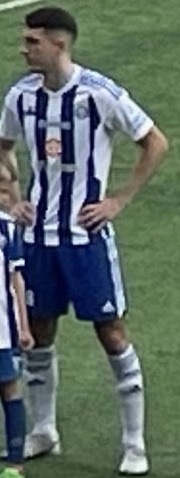
- Kanellopoulos with HJK in 2024

Personal information
- Date of birth: 29 January 2000 (age 26)
- Place of birth: Sparta, Laconia, Greece
- Height: 1.82 m (6 ft 0 in)
- Position: Midfielder

Team information
- Current team: OFI
- Number: 8

Youth career
- 2006–2014: Sparta
- 2014–2019: Asteras Tripolis

Senior career*
Years	Team	Apps	(Gls)
2019–2023	Asteras Tripolis	27	(0)
2023–2026	HJK	64	(2)
2026–	OFI	16	(0)

International career^{‡}
2021–2022	Greece U21	8	(0)
- * Club domestic league appearances and goals as of 20 September 2026 ‡ National team caps and goals as of 11 June 2022

Georgios Kanellopoulos (Greek: Γεώργιος Κανελλόπουλος; born 29 January 2000) is a Greek professional footballer who plays as a midfielder for Super League club OFI.

== Early years ==
Born in Sparta, Laconia, Kanellopoulos started playing football in a youth team of local club Sparta FC, before joining Asteras Tripolis youth sector in 2014.

== Club career ==
=== Asteras Tripolis ===
Kanellopoulos started his professional career with Asteras Tripolis first team in 2019. He made his debut in Super League Greece on 4 July 2020, as a late substitute in a 4–0 win against Volos.

=== HJK Helsinki ===
After spending two-and-a-half seasons with Asteras Tripolis, Kanellopoulos signed with Finnish champions HJK Helsinki on 14 January 2023, on a two-year deal with an option for an additional year.

In the 2023 season, Kanellopoulos helped HJK to first win the pre-season Finnish League Cup tournament, and ultimately to win the Finnish championship title, which was the fourth championship in a row for the club. Kanellopoulos also made 13 appearances in the HJK's 2023–24 European campaign, in which the club qualified to the UEFA Europa Conference League group stage.

On 30 September 2024, his contract option for the 2025 was exercised. At the end of the 2024 season, Kanellopoulos received the player of the season award, voted by the club's supporters. On 14 February 2025, he scored his first goal for HJK, and also the first official goal in his professional career, in a 2–1 win against IFK Mariehamn in Finnish League Cup.

== Career statistics ==
As of 17 March 2026

Appearances and goals by club, season and competition
Club	Season	League			National cup (Note: Includes Greek Cup and Suomen Cup)		League cup		Europe		Total	
Club	Season	Division	Apps	Goals	Apps	Goals	Apps	Goals	Apps	Goals	Apps	Goals
Asteras Tripolis	2019–20	Super League Greece	1	0	0	0	—		—		1	0
Asteras Tripolis	2020–21	Super League Greece	5	0	1	0	—		—		6	0
Asteras Tripolis	2021–22	Super League Greece	21	0	1	0	—		—		22	0
Asteras Tripolis	2022–23	Super League Greece	0	0	0	0	–		–		0	0
Asteras Tripolis	Total		27	0	2	0	—		0	0	29	0
HJK Helsinki	2023	Veikkausliiga	20	0	1	0	6	0	13 (Note: Three appearances in UEFA Champions League, two appearances in UEFA Europa League, eight appearances in UEFA Europa Conference League)	0	40	0
HJK Helsinki	2024	Veikkausliiga	20	0	1	0	1	0	12 (Note: Two appearances in UEFA Champions League and ten appearances in UEFA Conference League)	0	34	0
HJK Helsinki	2025	Veikkausliiga	24	2	3	0	5	1	3 (Note: Appearances in UEFA Conference League)	0	35	3
HJK Helsinki	Total		64	2	5	0	12	1	28	0	109	3
OFI Crete	2025–26	Super League Greece	7	0	2	0	—		—		9	0
Career total			98	2	9	0	12	1	28	0	147	3

== Honours ==
HJK

- Veikkausliiga: 2023
- Finnish Cup: 2025
- Finnish League Cup: 2023

OFI

- Greek Cup: 2025–26
- Greek Super Cup: 2026
