= 2026 HJK season =

118th season in existence of HJK Helsinki

HJK
2026 season
- Chairman: Olli-Pekka Lyytikäinen
- Manager: Joonas Rantanen
- Stadium: Bolt Arena
- Veikkausliiga: 2nd
- Finnish Cup: Runners-Up
- League Cup: Semi-final vs Oulu
- UEFA Conference League: Second qualifying round vs Motherwell
- Top goalscorer: League: Mads Borchers (22); All: Mads Borchers (25)
- Highest home attendance: 10,112 vs Oulu (8 November 2026)
- Lowest home attendance: 241 vs IFK Mariehamn (16 January 2026)
- Average home league attendance: 6,061 (8 November 2026)
| Home colours | Away colours | Third colours |

The 2026 season was Helsingin Jalkapalloklubi's 118th competitive season. HJK entered the Veikkausliiga season as four-time defending champions.

== Season events ==
On 30 November, HJK announced the appointment of Joonas Rantanen as their new head coach on a contract until the end of 2028.

On 4 December 2025, HJK announced the signing of Alfie Cicale from VPS to a two-year contract, with the option of an additional year, for an undisclosed fee.

On 3 January, HJK announced that Aaro Soiniemi had left the club to sign for IFK Mariehamn, and that Michael Boamah had left the club to sign for CT United.

HJK began preparations for the 2026 season with the Liigacup, under head coach Joonas Rantanen, who was appointed at the end of the previous season. In the opening match of the tournament on 16 January, HJK suffered a 0–1 defeat at home against IFK Mariehamn at the Tallinn Halli. On the same day, the club announced that Moroccan goalkeeper Issam El Maach had joined the team on a trial basis and featured in the Liigacup match against Mariehamn.

On 18 January, HJK announced the signing of free-agent Till Cissokho to a one-year contract, with the option of an additional year.

On 19 January, HJK announced that they had signed Ahti Haikala from Hongasta, Kalle Huhta from VPS and Niilo Siren from VJS Vantaa, with all three of them joining up with Klubi 04.

On 22 January, HJK announced that Prince Solomon Swaray and Clinton Jephta had joined the club on trial until the end of the month.

On 23 January, HJK announced the signing of Iivo Nybäck from Honka, on a contract until the end of the 2027 season with an option for the 2028 season.

On 5 February, HJK announced the return to the club of free-agent Lassi Lappalainen on a two-year contract.

On 6 February, HJK announced the return of Martin Kirilov from Torino Primavera to a three-year contract, for an undisclosed fee.

On 9 February, HJK announced that their contract with Benji Michel had been terminated by mutual agreement, and that they had signed Mads Borchers on loan from Ingolstadt 04 until July with an option to make the move permanent.

On 13 February, HJK announced the signing of free-agent Matej Marković to a one-year contract, with the option of an additional year.

On 17 February, HJK announced that Stanislav Baranov had left the club in order to sign for Ilves.

On 19 February, HJK announced the season-long loan signing of Leonel Montano from Silkeborg.

On 27 February, HJK announced the signing of Emmanuel Boateng on a contract for the 2026 season, which also includes an option for the 2027 season. However, on 18 March, HJK announced that Boateng's contract had been cancelled after he failed his medical.

On 27 March, HJK announced that Ville Vuorinen had left the club in order to sign for Jaro.

On 10 April, HJK announced the signing of Robert Mihhalevski from Tartu Kalev, to a two-year contract.

On 29 May, HJK announced the signing of Mouhamed Guèye from KV Kortrijk, with the Senegalese midfielder joining at the end of July when the Finnish transfer window opens, on a contract until the end of the 2027 season.

On 7 July, HJK announced the signing of Santeri Haarala from Djurgården on a contract until the end of 2028.

On 22 July, HJK announced that Brooklyn Lyons-Foster had left the club to join Derry City for an undisclosed fee.

On 24 July, HJK announced that Amara Nallo had joined the club on loan from Liverpool, for the remainder of the season.

On 28 July, HJK announced that they had exercised an option to make Mads Borchers loan deal with Ingolstadt 04 a permanent transfer, with Borchers signing a contract until the end of 2028.

On 31 July, Kalle Huhta joined Tampere United on loan for the remainder of the season.

On 14 August, HJK announced that Toivo Mero had left the club to sign for De Graafschap for a significant transfer fee, and that Jasper Samooja had joined the club on loan from Lecce for the remainder of the season.

On 18 August, HJK announced the signing of Pape Ibrahima Ndir from Olympique Thiès on loan until the end of the season.

On 24 August, HJK announced the return to the club of Nikolai Alho, on a contract until the end of the 2027 season. The following day, 25 August, HJK announced the signing of Joona Veteli from Ilves on a contract until the end of 2027.

On 31 August, HJK announced that they had extended their contract with Miska Ylitolva until the end of the 2027 season, and that he had joined Kalmar on loan for the remainder of the season.

On 11 September, HJK announced that they had extended their contract with Liam Möller for the 2027 season. The following day, 12 September, HJK announced that Kaius Simojoki had also extended his contract for the 2027 season.

On 3 October, HJK announced that Amara Nallo had returned to his parent club Liverpool, after suffering an injury that would see him miss the remainder of the Veikkausliiga season.

On 20 October, Teemu Pukki announced that he would retire from football at the end of the season, with his last game coming on 8 November against AC Oulu.

On 28 October, HJK announced that Jesse Öst would leave the club when his contract expires at the end of the season, and that they had signed Osku Maukonen from Lahti on a contract until the end of the 2028 season, with an option to extended.

On 1 November, Alexander Ring announced that he would retire from football at the end of the season, with his last game coming on 8 November against AC Oulu.

== Squad ==
As of match played 8 November 2026

| No. | Name | Nationality | Position | Date of birth (age) | Signed from | Signed in | Contract ends | Apps. | Goals |
Goalkeepers
| 1 | Jesse Öst | (Finland) | GK | 20 October 1990 (aged 36) | SJK | 2023 | 2026 | 73 | 0 |
| 12 | Mitja Haapanen | (Finland) | GK | August 4, 2007 (aged 19) | Academy | 2026 | | 0 | 0 |
| 30 | Jasper Samooja | (Finland) | GK | July 21, 2003 (aged 23) | on loan from Lecce | 2026 | 2026 | 4 | 0 |
| 33 | Osku Maukonen | (Finland) | GK | February 15, 2007 (aged 19) | Lahti | 2026 | 2028 | 0 | 0 |
| 44 | Matej Marković | (Croatia) | GK | July 22, 1996 (aged 30) | Unattached | 2026 | 2026 (+1) | 26 | 0 |
Defenders
| 3 | Till Cissokho | (France) | DF | February 8, 2000 (aged 26) | Unattached | 2026 | 2026 (+1) | 29 | 0 |
| 6 | Ville Tikkanen | (Finland) | DF | 8 August 1999 (aged 27) | SJK | 2025 | | 81 | 2 |
| 13 | Kaius Simojoki | (Finland) | DF | 21 March 2006 (aged 20) | KäPa | 2024 | 2027 | 71 | 1 |
| 14 | Leonel Montano | (Denmark) | DF | October 2, 1999 (aged 27) | on loan from Silkeborg | 2026 | 2026 | 35 | 3 |
| 17 | Nikolai Alho | (Finland) | DF | 12 March 1993 (aged 33) | Unattached | 2026 | 2027 | 231 | 28 |
| 24 | Emil Leveälahti | (Finland) | DF | 12 December 2006 (aged 19) | Klubi 04 | 2026 | | 11 | 1 |
| 31 | Mihailo Bogićević | (Serbia) | DF | 30 May 1998 (aged 28) | Spartak Subotica | 2025. | 2026 | 34 | 1 |
| 35 | Eemil Toivonen | (Finland) | DF | 12 December 2006 (aged 19) | Klubi 04 | 2023 | 2026 | 2 | 0 |
| 46 | Iivo Nybäck | (Finland) | DF | 9 August 2009 (aged 17) | Honka | 2026 | 2028 | 0 | 0 |
| 92 | Mustafa Ameen | (Finland) | DF | 8 June 2006 (aged 20) | Klubi 04 | 2026 | | 2 | 1 |
Midfielders
| 4 | Alexander Ring | (Finland) | MF | 9 April 1991 (aged 35) | Unattached | 2025 | 2026 | 122 | 29 |
| 7 | Alfie Cicale | (England) | MF | April 19, 2002 (aged 24) | VPS | 2026 | 2027 (+1) | 40 | 8 |
| 8 | Pyry Mentu | (Finland) | MF | 1 November 2006 (aged 20) | Klubi 04 | 2022 | 2027 | 84 | 4 |
| 10 | Lucas Lingman | (Finland) | MF | 25 January 1998 (aged 28) | Helsingborg | 2024 | 2026 | 269 | 14 |
| 11 | Martin Kirilov | (Finland) | MF | 8 August 2007 (aged 19) | Torino Primavera | 2026 | 2028 | 34 | 6 |
| 15 | Jere Kallinen | (Finland) | MF | 10 January 2002 (aged 24) | AC Oulu | 2025 | | 61 | 4 |
| 16 | Antton Nylund | (Finland) | MF | 18 June 2008 (aged 18) | Klubi 04 | 2026 | | 3 | 0 |
| 22 | Liam Möller | (Finland) | MF | 21 December 2004 (aged 21) | Klubi 04 | 2023 | 2027 | 92 | 18 |
| 26 | Lassi Lappalainen | (Finland) | MF | 24 August 1998 (aged 28) | Unattached | 2026 | 2027 | 78 | 12 |
| 29 | Santeri Haarala | (Finland) | MF | 17 December 1999 (aged 26) | Djurgården | 2026 | 2028 | 21 | 6 |
| 32 | Mouhamed Guèye | (Senegal) | MF | 16 November 2003 (aged 22) | KV Kortrijk | 2026 | 2027 | 13 | 2 |
| 77 | Joona Veteli | (Finland) | MF | 21 April 1995 (aged 31) | Ilves | 2026 | 2027 | 7 | 1 |
Forwards
| 9 | Mads Borchers | (Denmark) | FW | June 18, 2002 (aged 24) | Ingolstadt 04 | 2026 | 2028 | 40 | 25 |
| 19 | David Ezeh | (Finland) | FW | 13 February 2006 (aged 20) | Klubi 04 | 2023 | 2026 | 51 | 9 |
| 20 | Teemu Pukki | (Finland) | FW | 29 March 1990 (aged 36) | Minnesota United | 2025 | 2026 | 119 | 53 |
| 21 | Pape Ibrahima Ndir | (Senegal) | FW | 11 January 2007 (aged 19) | on loan from Olympique Thiès | 2026 | 2026 | 0 | 0 |
| 91 | Roni Hudd | (Finland) | FW | 20 January 2005 (aged 21) | VPS | 2024 | 2026(+1) | 18 | 2 |
Klubi 04
| 61 | Valo Konttas | (Finland) | FW | 7 August 2007 (aged 19) | Klubi 04 | 2026 | | 2 | 0 |
| 62 | Leevi Palmula | (Finland) | MF | 23 February 2008 (aged 18) | Klubi 04 | 2026 | | 2 | 0 |
| 71 | Jay De Nascimento | (Finland) | FW | 3 January 2009 (aged 17) | Klubi 04 | 2026 | | 1 | 0 |
| 87 | Nicklas Kroupkin | (Finland) | MF | 19 July 2009 (aged 17) | Klubi 04 | 2026 | | 2 | 0 |
| | Robert Mihhalevski | (Estonia) | MF | 10 January 2009 (aged 17) | Tartu Kalev | 2026 | 2027 | 0 | 0 |
Away on loan
| 28 | Miska Ylitolva | (Finland) | DF | 23 May 2004 (aged 22) | RoPS | 2022 | 2027 | 96 | 3 |
Trialist
| 18 | Clinton Jephta | (Nigeria) | MF | October 21, 2006 (aged 20) | Niger Tornadoes | 2026 | 2026 | 2 | 1 |
| 30 | Issam El Maach | (Morocco) | GK | February 1, 2001 (aged 25) | Twente | 2026 | 2026 | 1 | 0 |
Left during the season
| 2 | Brooklyn Lyons-Foster | (England) | DF | 1 December 2000 (aged 25) | Tottenham Hotspur | 2024 | 2026 (+1) | 80 | 5 |
| 5 | Daniel O'Shaughnessy | (Finland) | DF | 14 September 1994 (aged 32) | Karlsruher SC | 2024 | 2026 | 144 | 9 |
| 5 | Amara Nallo | (England) | DF | 18 November 2006 (aged 19) | on loan from Liverpool | 2026 | 2026 | 3 | 0 |
| 14 | Matias Ritari | (Finland) | MF | 15 July 2005 (aged 21) | Klubi 04 | 2023 | 2026(+1) | 18 | 2 |
| 18 | Toivo Mero | (Finland) | FW | 7 October 2007 (aged 19) | Klubi 04 | 2024 | 2027 | 38 | 8 |
| 49 | Otto Hannula | (Finland) | MF | 29 September 2005 (aged 21) | Klubi 04 | 2023 | 2026 | 8 | 1 |
| 91 | Ville Vuorinen | (Finland) | FW | 21 February 2005 (aged 21) | Klubi 04 | 2023 | | 13 | 2 |
| 95 | Stanislav Baranov | (Finland) | FW | 15 April 2005 (aged 21) | Klubi 04 | 2023 | 2026 | 11 | 3 |
| 99 | Benji Michel | (United States) | FW | 23 October 1997 (aged 29) | Unattached | 2025 | 2026 | 36 | 9 |
| | Salem Bouajila | (Finland) | FW | 1 August 2007 (aged 19) | Klubi 04 | 2025 | | 1 | 0 |

== Transfers ==
=== In ===
| Date | Position | Nationality | Name | From | Fee | Ref. |
|---|---|---|---|---|---|---|
| 4 December 2025† | MF | (England) | Alfie Cicale | VPS | Undisclosed | |
| 18 January 2026 | DF | (France) | Till Cissokho | Unattached | Free | |
| 19 January 2026 | MF | (Finland) | Ahti Haikala | Hongasta | Undisclosed | |
| 19 January 2026 | MF | (Finland) | Kalle Huhta | VPS | Undisclosed | |
| 19 January 2026 | MF | (Finland) | Niilo Siren | VJS Vantaa | Undisclosed | |
| 23 January 2026 | DF | (Finland) | Iivo Nybäck | Honka | Undisclosed | |
| 5 February 2026 | MF | (Finland) | Lassi Lappalainen | Unattached | Free | |
| 6 February 2026 | MF | (Finland) | Martin Kirilov | Torino Primavera | Undisclosed | |
| 13 February 2026 | GK | (Croatia) | Matej Marković | Unattached | Free | |
| 10 April 2026 | MF | (Estonia) | Robert Mihhalevski | Tartu Kalev | Undisclosed | |
| 29 May 2026†† | MF | (Senegal) | Mouhamed Guèye | KV Kortrijk | Undisclosed | |
| 7 July 2026 | MF | (Finland) | Santeri Haarala | Djurgården | Undisclosed | |
| 28 July 2026 | FW | (Finland) | Mads Borchers | Ingolstadt 04 | Undisclosed | |
| 24 August 2026 | DF | (Finland) | Nikolai Alho | Unattached | Free | |
| 25 August 2026 | MF | (Finland) | Joona Veteli | Ilves | Undisclosed | |
| 28 October 2026 | GK | (Finland) | Osku Maukonen | Lahti | Undisclosed | |

† Transfers announced on the above date, being finalised on 1 January 2026.
†† Transfers announced on the above date, being finalised on 1 July 2026.

=== Loans in ===
| Start date | Position | Nationality | Name | From | End date | Ref. |
|---|---|---|---|---|---|---|
| 9 February 2026 | FW | (Denmark) | Mads Borchers | Ingolstadt 04 | 28 July 2026 | |
| 19 February 2026 | DF | (Denmark) | Leonel Montano | Silkeborg | Undisclosed | |
| 24 July 2026 | DF | (England) | Amara Nallo | Liverpool | 3 October 2026 | |
| 14 August 2026 | GK | (Finland) | Jasper Samooja | Lecce | 31 December 2026 | |
| 18 August 2026 | FW | (Senegal) | Pape Ibrahima Ndir | Olympique Thiès | 31 December 2026 | |

=== Out ===
| Date | Position | Nationality | Name | To | Fee | Ref. |
|---|---|---|---|---|---|---|
| 3 January 2026 | DF | (Finland) | Michael Boamah | CT United | Undisclosed | |
| 3 January 2026 | DF | (Finland) | Aaro Soiniemi | IFK Mariehamn | Undisclosed | |
| 17 February 2026 | FW | (Finland) | Stanislav Baranov | Ilves | Undisclosed | |
| 27 March 2026 | FW | (Finland) | Ville Vuorinen | Jaro | Undisclosed | |
| 17 June 2026 | FW | (Finland) | Salem Bouajila | Göztepe | Undisclosed | |
| 22 July 2026 | DF | (England) | Brooklyn Lyons-Foster | Derry City | Undisclosed | |
| 14 August 2026 | FW | (Finland) | Toivo Mero | De Graafschap | Undisclosed | |

=== Loans out ===
| Start date | Position | Nationality | Name | To | End date | Ref. |
|---|---|---|---|---|---|---|
| 23 September 2025 | FW | (Finland) | Salem Bouajila | Göztepe | 30 June 2026 | |
| 31 July 2026 | MF | (Finland) | Kalle Huhta | Tampere United | Undisclosed | |
| 31 August 2026 | DF | (Finland) | Miska Ylitolva | Kalmar | Undisclosed | |

=== Released ===
| Date | Position | Nationality | Name | Joined | Date | Ref. |
|---|---|---|---|---|---|---|
| 9 February 2026 | FW | (United States) | Benji Michel | Ulsan HD | | |
| 25 April 2026 | DF | (Finland) | Daniel O'Shaughnessy | Retirement | | |
| 31 December 2026 | GK | (Finland) | Jesse Öst | | | |
| 31 December 2026 | MF | (Finland) | Alexander Ring | Retirement | | |
| 31 December 2026 | FW | (Finland) | Teemu Pukki | Retirement | | |

=== Trial ===
| Date from | Position | Nationality | Name | Last club | Date to | Ref. |
|---|---|---|---|---|---|---|
| 16 January 2026 | GK | (Morocco) | Issam El Maach | Twente | | |
| 22 January 2026 | MF | (Nigeria) | Clinton Jephta | Niger Tornadoes | 31 January 2026 | |
| 22 January 2026 | MF | (United States) | Prince Solomon Swaray | Club Ohio | 31 January 2026 | |

== Friendlies ==
| 13 February 2026 | HJK | 1–2 | Hammarby | Helsinki |
| 13:00 EET (UTC+2) | Ezeh 67' | Report | Besara 22'; Persson 81' | Stadium: Tali halli TN; Referee: Antti Munukka |

| 10 March 2026 | HJK | 3–0 | IF Gnistan | Helsinki |
| 12:00 EET (UTC+2) | Mero 11'; Borchers 33'; Kirilov 90+4' | Report | | Stadium: Töölö Football Stadium; Referee: Antti Munukka |

| 21 March 2026 | HJK | 1–0 | SJK | Helsinki |
| 13:00 EET (UTC+2) | Mero 70' | Report | | Stadium: Töölö Football Stadium |

| 27 March 2026 | Djurgården | 4–2 | HJK | Stockholm |
| 14:00 EET (UTC+2) | Okkels 13'; Hegland 45+1' (pen.); Lien 79' (pen.); Une 86' | Report | Montano 16'; Borchers 35'; Bogićević (yellow card) (yellow-red card) 44' | Stadium: 3Arena |

== Competitions ==
=== Overall record ===
| Competition | First match | Last match | Starting round | Final position | Record | | | | | | | |
| Competition | First match | Last match | Starting round | Final position | Pld | W | D | L | GF | GA | GD | Win % |
|---|---|---|---|---|---|---|---|---|---|---|---|---|
| Veikkausliiga | 4 April 2026 | 8 November 2026 | Matchday 1 | Runnersup | 32 | 17 | 8 | 7 | 66 | 39 | +27 | 53.13 |
| Finnish Cup | 13 May 2026 | 5 September 2026 | Last 16 | Runnersup | 5 | 4 | 0 | 1 | 24 | 4 | +20 | 80.00 |
| League Cup | 16 January 2026 | 14 March 2026 | Group stage | Semi-final | 6 | 3 | 0 | 3 | 10 | 8 | +2 | 50.00 |
| UEFA Conference League | 23 July 2026 | 13 August 2026 | First qualifying round | Third qualifying round | 4 | 2 | 1 | 1 | 9 | 3 | +6 | 50.00 |
| Total | | | | | 47 | 26 | 9 | 12 | 109 | 54 | +55 | 55.32 |

Last updated: 8 November 2026
Source: HJK Helsinki

=== Veikkausliiga ===
==== Regular season ====
===== Table =====
| Pos | Team | Pld | W | D | L | GF | GA | GD | Pts | Qualification |
|---|---|---|---|---|---|---|---|---|---|---|
| 1 | KuPS | 22 | 12 | 7 | 3 | 38 | 23 | +15 | 43 | Qualification for the Championship Round |
| 2 | Inter Turku | 22 | 11 | 9 | 2 | 29 | 16 | +13 | 42 | Qualification for the Championship Round |
| 3 | HJK | 22 | 11 | 4 | 7 | 36 | 27 | +9 | 37 | Qualification for the Championship Round |
| 4 | IF Gnistan | 22 | 10 | 6 | 6 | 36 | 29 | +7 | 36 | Qualification for the Championship Round |
| 5 | AC Oulu | 22 | 10 | 4 | 8 | 25 | 25 | 0 | 34 | Qualification for the Championship Round |

Source: Flashscore
Rules for classification: 1) Points; 2) Goal difference; 3) Goals scored; 4) Head-to-head points; 5) Head-to-head goal difference; 6) Head-to-head away goals scored; 7) Play-off
(Note: Play-off is only played if need to decide champion, teams for relegation or UEFA competition and will be played on a neutral ground).

===== Results summary =====
| Overall | | | | | | | | Home | | | | | | Away | | | | | |
| Pld | W | D | L | GF | GA | GD | Pts | W | D | L | GF | GA | GD | W | D | L | GF | GA | GD |
|---|---|---|---|---|---|---|---|---|---|---|---|---|---|---|---|---|---|---|---|
| 22 | 11 | 4 | 7 | 36 | 27 | +9 | 37 | 6 | 2 | 3 | 18 | 14 | +4 | 5 | 2 | 4 | 18 | 13 | +5 |

Last updated: 31 August 2026.
Source: See Matches

===== Matches =====
| 4 April 2026 1 | HJK | 3–0 | SJK | Helsinki |
| 15:00 EEST (UTC+3) | Ezeh 36'; Pukki 49'; Mero 81' | Report | Mani (yellow card) 51'; Boström (yellow card) 80' | Stadium: Töölö Football Stadium; Attendance: 5,041; Referee: Mohammad Al-Emara |

| 11 April 2026 2 | HJK | 0–1 | Oulu | Helsinki |
| 17:00 EEST (UTC+3) | Kirilov (yellow card) 90+2' | Report | Mendolin (yellow card) 16'; Körkkö (yellow card) 20'; Kallio 28'; Paananen (yellow card) 37'; Pitkänen (yellow card) 67' | Stadium: Töölö Football Stadium; Attendance: 4,519; Referee: Peiman Simani |

| 18 April 2026 3 | IF Gnistan | 0–3 | HJK | Helsinki |
| 14:00 EEST (UTC+3) | Europaeus (yellow card) 49'; Hannula (yellow card) 73' | Report | Pukki 44', 52'; Bogićević 79' | Stadium: Oulunkylä Football Stadium; Attendance: 3,070; Referee: Mohammad Al-Emara |

| 26 April 2026 4 | KuPS | 1–1 | HJK | Kuopio |
| 16:00 EEST (UTC+3) | Ruoppi 2'; Armah (yellow card) 68' | Report | Bogićević (yellow card) 35'; Marković (yellow card) 44'; Borchers 47' | Stadium: Kuopio Football Stadium; Attendance: 2,881; Referee: Joni Hyytiä |

| 29 April 2026 5 | Inter Turku | 1–1 | HJK | Turku |
| 19:00EEST (UTC+3) | Ahiabu (yellow card) 29'; Ulundu 42'; Hämäläinen (yellow card) 83' | Report | Möller 43'; Borchers (yellow card) 68' | Stadium: Kupittaa Football Stadium; Attendance: 2,686; Referee: Peiman Simani |

| 4 May 2026 6 | HJK | 1–0 | Lahti | Helsinki |
| 19:00 EEST (UTC+3) | Cicale 24'; Kirilov (yellow card) 84'; Bogićević (yellow card) 88' | Report | Neemias (yellow card) 62' (yellow-red card) 89'; Ferreira (yellow card) 74' | Stadium: Töölö Football Stadium; Attendance: 5,052; Referee: Dennis Antamo |

| 8 May 2026 7 | TPS | 1–0 | HJK | Turku |
| 18:00 EEST (UTC+3) | Juvanteny (yellow card) 5'; Tsirigotis 51'; Turkki (yellow card) 90+1' | Report | Mentu (yellow card) 63' | Stadium: Kupittaa Football Stadium; Attendance: 3,547; Referee: Matti Roth |

| 16 May 2026 8 | HJK | 2–2 | Ilves | Helsinki |
| 14:00 EEST (UTC+3) | Tikkanen (yellow card) 20'; Lyons-Foster 43'; Borchers 83'; Bogićević (yellow card) 79' (yellow-red card) 90' | Report | Stjopin 21', 60' (yellow card) 90+1' | Stadium: Töölö Football Stadium; Attendance: 5,052; Referee: Mohammad Al-Emara |

| 22 May 2026 9 | VPS | 2–1 | HJK | Vaasa |
| 19:00 EEST (UTC+3) | Okereke (yellow card) 24'; Daoussi (yellow card) 57'; Smyth 64'; Lindholm (yellow card) 72' (goal) 76' (pen.); Räisänen (yellow card) 79'; Jalloh (yellow card) 90+5' | Report | Lappalainen 6'; Öst (yellow card) 71' | Stadium: Hietalahti Stadium; Attendance: 3,109; Referee: Amir Hajizadeh |

| 30 May 2026 10 | HJK | 1–0 | IFK Mariehamn | Helsinki |
| 15:00 EEST (UTC+3) | Lingman (yellow card) 40'; Ring 48' (pen.); Kirilov (yellow card) 90+5' | Report | Andersson (yellow card) 20'; Nurmi (yellow card) 28'; Patut (yellow card) 63'; Soiniemi (yellow card) 90+7' | Stadium: Töölö Football Stadium; Attendance: 5,786; Referee: Joni Hyytiä |

| 13 June 2026 11 | Jaro | 2–5 | HJK | Jakobstad |
| 17:00 EEST (UTC+3) | Ness 4'; Hardén 17'; Vuorinen (yellow card) 20'; Kawo (yellow card) 78'; Ogungbaro (red card) 82' | Report | Ring 30'; Mero (yellow card) 41'; Tikkanen 57'; Ylitolva 65'; Borchers 69', 84'; Kirilov (yellow card) 87' | Stadium: Pietarsaari Football Stadium; Attendance: 2,783; Referee: Mohammad Al-Emara |

| 17 June 2026 12 | HJK | 3–3 | Inter Turku | Helsinki |
| 18:00 EEST (UTC+3) | Möller 25'; Tikkanen (yellow card) 48'; Leveälahti (yellow card) 75'; Borchers 85', 90' | Report | Tuominen 9'; Ylitolva 19' (o.g.); Cicale 71' (o.g.) | Stadium: Töölö Football Stadium; Attendance: 6,082; Referee: Peiman Simani |

| 23 June 2026 13 | IFK Mariehamn | 0–4 | HJK | Mariehamn |
| EEST (UTC+3) | Pearce (yellow card) 56'; Nissinen (yellow card) 90+2' | Report | Pukki 31'; Borchers 65'; Lappalainen 66', 86'; Montano (yellow card) 81' | Stadium: Wiklöf Holding Arena; Attendance: 1,502; Referee: Amir Hajizadeh |

| 27 June 2026 14 | HJK | 0–4 | KuPS | Helsinki |
| 17:00 EEST (UTC+3) | Tikkanen (red card) 12' | Report | Pennanen 42', 53'; Moreno 79'; Heinonen 84' | Stadium: Töölö Football Stadium; Attendance: 6,748; Referee: Antti Munukka |

| 11 July 2026 15 | Lahti | 2–0 | HJK | Lahti |
| 15:00 EEST (UTC+3) | Müller (yellow card) 16'; Koskinen 44'; Montiel (yellow card) 47'; Dantas (yellow card) 48'; Yapi (yellow card) 74'; Neemias 75' | Report | | Stadium: Toolpoint Arena; Attendance: 4,152; Referee: Dennis Antamo |

| 18 July 2026 16 | HJK | 2–1 | VPS | Helsinki |
| 15:00 EEST (UTC+3) | Guèye (yellow card) 45'; Haarala 45+1'; Pukki 75' (pen.); Lyons-Foster (yellow card) 89'; Mero (yellow card) 90+2' | Report | Lindholm (yellow card) 35' (goal) 46' | Stadium: Töölö Football Stadium; Attendance: 5,014; Referee: Joni Hyytiä |

| 26 July 2026 17 | HJK | 1–0 | TPS | Helsinki |
| 17:00 EEST (UTC+3) | Haarala 16'; Ring (yellow card) 32' | Report | Zaal (yellow card) 69' | Stadium: Töölö Football Stadium; Attendance: 5,644; Referee: Amir Hajizadeh |

| 3 August 2026 18 | SJK | 3–0 | HJK | Seinäjoki |
| 19:00 EEST (UTC+3) | Streng (yellow card) 45' (goal) 61'; Kelwin 56'; Murilo 66'; Suso (yellow card) 90+3' | Report | Montano (yellow card) 63' | Stadium: OmaSP Stadion; Attendance: 2,922; Referee: Oliver Reitala |

| 9 August 2026 19 | Oulu | 0–1 | HJK | Oulu |
| 19:00 EEST (UTC+3) | Arsalo (yellow card) 20'; Jatta (yellow card) 77'; Santos (yellow card) 79' | Report | Guèye 44'; Kirilov (yellow card) 63'; Tikkanen (yellow card) 79'; Lingman (yellow card) 80' | Stadium: Raatti Stadium; Attendance: 3,622; Referee: Peiman Simani |

| 16 August 2026 20 | HJK | 3–0 | Jaro | Helsinki |
| 16:00 EEST (UTC+3) | Cicale 5'; Borchers 9'; Kirilov 68' | Report | Skau (yellow card) 48'; Kawo (yellow card) 72'; Vidjeskog (yellow card) 78' | Stadium: Töölö Football Stadium; Attendance: 5,044; Referee: Jonah Kontinen |

| 23 August 2026 21 | HJK | 2–3 | IF Gnistan | Helsinki |
| 15:00 EEST (UTC+3) | Haarala 23'; Tikkanen 45+2'; Ring (yellow card) 55'; Simojoki (yellow card) 70' | Report | Milovanov (yellow card) 67'; Akinyemi 68', 83'; Arko-Mensah (yellow card) 78'; Pérez 89'; Jurička (yellow card) 90'; Lyberopoulos (yellow card) 90+2' | Stadium: Töölö Football Stadium; Attendance: 8,363; Referee: Dennis Antamo |

| 31 August 2026 22 | Ilves | 1–2 | HJK | Tampere |
| 19:00 EEST (UTC+3) | Krkalić (yellow card) 55'; Wallius 59' | Report | Kirilov (yellow card) 24'; Ring 57' (pen.); Borchers 74' | Stadium: Tammelan Stadion; Attendance: 3,719; Referee: Amir Hajizadeh |

==== Championship round ====
===== Table =====
| Pos | Team | Pld | W | D | L | GF | GA | GD | Pts | Qualification |
|---|---|---|---|---|---|---|---|---|---|---|
| 1 | Inter Turku (C) | 32 | 17 | 10 | 5 | 43 | 27 | +16 | 61 | Qualification for the Champions League first qualifying round |
| 2 | HJK | 32 | 17 | 8 | 7 | 66 | 39 | +27 | 59 | Qualification for the Conference League second qualifying round (Note: Inter Turku qualified for the Conference League second qualifying round as the 2026 Finnish Cup winners. Since they won the championship, the spot passed to the second-placed team.) |
| 3 | KuPS | 32 | 14 | 11 | 7 | 46 | 33 | +13 | 53 | Qualification for the Conference League first qualifying round |
| 4 | AC Oulu | 32 | 14 | 6 | 12 | 41 | 40 | +1 | 48 | Qualification for the Conference League first qualifying round |
| 5 | IF Gnistan | 32 | 12 | 10 | 10 | 52 | 47 | +5 | 46 | |

Source: Flashscore
Rules for classification: 1) Points; 2) Goal difference; 3) Goals scored; 4) Head-to-head points; 5) Head-to-head goal difference; 6) Head-to-head away goals scored; 7) Play-off
(Note: Play-off is only played if need to decide champion, teams for relegation or UEFA competition and will be played on a neutral ground).
(C) Champions

===== Results summary =====
| Overall | | | | | | | | Home | | | | | | Away | | | | | |
| Pld | W | D | L | GF | GA | GD | Pts | W | D | L | GF | GA | GD | W | D | L | GF | GA | GD |
|---|---|---|---|---|---|---|---|---|---|---|---|---|---|---|---|---|---|---|---|
| 10 | 6 | 4 | 0 | 30 | 13 | +17 | 22 | 3 | 2 | 0 | 17 | 7 | +10 | 3 | 2 | 0 | 13 | 6 | +7 |

Last updated: 2 November 2026.
Source: See Matches

===== Results =====
| 9 September 2026 23 | HJK | 2–1 | Inter Turku | Helsinki |
| 18:00 EEST (UTC+3) | Borchers 53'; Simojoki 81'; Mentu (yellow card) 89' | Report | Kuittinen (yellow card) 26'; Ahiabu 37'; Granlund (yellow card) 87' | Stadium: Töölö Football Stadium; Attendance: 3,916; Referee: Dennis Antamo |

| 13 September 2026 24 | KuPS | 0–0 | HJK | Kuopio |
| 15:00 EEST (UTC+3) | Puukko (yellow card) 34' | Report | Kirilov (yellow card) 90' | Stadium: Kuopio Football Stadium; Attendance: 3,325; Referee: Jonah Kontinen |

| 18 September 2026 25 | IF Gnistan | 1–1 | HJK | Helsinki |
| 19:00 EEST (UTC+3) | Obileye 22'; Launiala (yellow card) 84' | Report | Mentu 24' | Stadium: Oulunkylä Football Stadium; Attendance: 3,024; Referee: Oliver Reitala |

| 8 October 2026 26 | HJK | 6–0 | VPS | Helsinki |
| 18:00 EEST (UTC+3) | Pukki 6'; Borchers 17', 38', 53'; Montano 61'; Cicale 71' | Report | Jalloh (yellow card) 41'; Lima (yellow card) 41'; Lindholm (yellow card) 14' | Stadium: Töölö Football Stadium; Attendance: 4,502; Referee: Oliver Reitala |

| 12 October 2026 27 | Oulu | 3–4 | HJK | Oulu |
| 19:00 EEST (UTC+3) | Triana 48'; Kaukua (yellow card) 53'; Riski 77'; Pitkänen (yellow card) 79'; Ghezali (yellow card) 80'; Pirinen 84'; Mäkeläinen (yellow card) 90+4' | Report | Borchers 20', 64'; Möller 41'; Veteli 86' | Stadium: Raatti Stadium; Attendance: 3,894; Referee: Antti Munukka |

| 17 October 2026 28 | HJK | 4–0 | IF Gnistan | Helsinki |
| 16:00 EEST (UTC+3) | Borchers 50', 66', 90+2' (yellow card) 54'; Haarala 60' | Report | Europaeus (yellow card) 12'; Atarah (yellow card) 30'; Eremenko (yellow card) 47'; Arko-Mensah (red card) 54' | Stadium: Töölö Football Stadium; Attendance: 6,604; Referee: Simani Peiman |

| 25 October 2026 29 | HJK | 2–2 | KuPS | Helsinki |
| 15:00 EET (UTC+2) | Möller (yellow card) 43' (goal) 53'; Ring (yellow card) 44'; Alho 74' (yellow card) 76' | Report | Pennanen 55' (yellow card) 77'; Moreno 56'; Eskesen (yellow card) 75'; Lötjönen (yellow card) 83' | Stadium: Töölö Football Stadium; Attendance: 9,502; Referee: Antamo Dennis |

| 29 October 2026 30 | Inter Turku | 2–4 | HJK | Turku |
| 18:00 EET (UTC+2) | Conteh 33'; Jephta (yellow card) 35'; Tuominen 52'; Hämäläinen (yellow card) 62' | Report | Montano 19'; Bogićević (yellow card) 29'; Borchers 36'; Mentu (yellow card) 58'; Tikkanen (yellow card) 61'; Lappalainen 70'; Cicale 75' | Stadium: Kupittaa Football Stadium; Attendance: 5,669; Referee: Mohammad Al-Emara |

| 2 November 2026 31 | VPS | 0–4 | HJK | Vaasa |
| 18:00 EET (UTC+2) | Jalloh (yellow card) 21'; Räisänen (yellow card) 48' | Report | Borchers 6'; Haarala 33', 54'; Cicale 42'; Lingman (yellow card) 88' | Stadium: Hietalahti Stadium; Attendance: 2,214; Referee: Kontinen Joona |

| 8 November 2026 32 | HJK | 3–3 | Oulu | Helsinki |
| 15:00 EET (UTC+2) | Borchers 76', 77'; Alho 86' | Report | Triana 10'; Bogićević 27' (o.g.); Pitkänen (yellow card) 39'; Pirinen (yellow card) 45+2'; Kemppainen (yellow card) 60'; Ojala (red card) 80'; Karjalainen (yellow card) 84' | Stadium: Töölö Football Stadium; Attendance: 10,112; Referee: Mohammad Al-Emara |

=== Finnish Cup ===
| 13 May 2026 Last 32 | RoPS | 0–4 | HJK | Rovaniemi |
| 18:30 EEST (UTC+3) | | Report | Leveälahti 15'; Lappalainen 28'; Ylitolva (yellow card) 37'; Ameen 87'; Cicale 88' | Stadium: Rovaniemen keskuskenttä Attendance: 1,725; Referee: Tatu Korkalainen |

| 26 May 2026 Last 167 | HJK | 11–1 | MyPA | Helsinki |
| 19:00 EEST (UTC+3) | Mero 9', 85'; Karppanen 16' (o.g.); Kirilov 20', 23'; Borchers 26', 32'; Leveälahti (yellow card) 59'; Ezeh 67', 78'; Möller 72', 84' | Report | Haimi 69' | Stadium: Töölö Football Stadium; Attendance: 2,568; Referee: Lotta Vuorio |

| 9 June 2026 Quarterfinal | Honka | 1–7 | HJK | Espoo |
| EEST (UTC+3) | Umeh 5' | Report | Ring 8'; Mero 17', 32'; Pukki 22'; Lingman (yellow card) 40'; Montano 61'; Hudd (yellow card) 65' (goal) 81'; Kirilov 89' | Stadium: Leppävaara Stadion; Attendance: 2,400; Referee: Amir Hajizadeh |

| 1 July 2026 Semifinal | HJK | 2–1 | Ilves | Helsinki |
| 19:00 EEST (UTC+3) | Möller 3'; Tikkanen (red card) 34'; Montano (yellow card) 75'; Cicale 79' | Report | Bamba (red card) 39'; Hytönen 73' | Stadium: Töölö Football Stadium; Attendance: 3,112; Referee: Peiman Simani |

| 5 September 2026 Final | Inter Turku | 1–0 | HJK | Tampere |
| 18:10 EEST (UTC+3) | Conteh 45+11'; Kuittinen (yellow card) 86' | Report | Montano (yellow card) 35'; Alho (yellow card) 71'; Lingman (yellow card) 90+3' | Stadium: Tammelan Stadion; Attendance: 4,791; Referee: Mohammad Al-Emara |

=== League Cup ===
==== Group Stage ====
| 16 January 2026 1 | HJK | 0–1 | IFK Mariehamn | Helsinki |
| 15:30 EET (UTC+2) | Tikkanen (yellow card) 70' | Report | Nissinen (yellow card) 33' (goal) 54' | Stadium: Tali halli TN; Attendance: 241; Referee: Matti Roth |

| 24 January 2026 2 | Lahti | 2–0 | HJK | Lahti |
| 15:00 EET (UTC+2) | Heikkinen 23'; Müller (red card); Belabid 85' | Report | Lyons-Foster (red card) 83'; Mentu (yellow card) 90+6' | Stadium: Mukkula Hall TN; Attendance: 167; Referee: Peiman Simani |

| 31 January 2026 3 | Inter Turku | 1–3 | HJK | Turku |
| 14:00 EET (UTC+2) | Kangasniemi (yellow card) 44' (goal) 63'; Niska (red card) 48' | Report | Möller 26'; Pukki 49' (pen.); Jephta 57'; Ezeh (yellow card) 76'; Bogićević (yellow card) 90+4' | Stadium: Impivaara Arena; Attendance: 100; Referee: Joni Hyytiä |

| 7 February 2026 4 | HJK | 3–1 | IF Gnistan | Helsinki |
| 14:00 EET (UTC+2) | Ring 15'; Pukki 45+3' (pen.); Kirilov 88' | Report | Latonen 46'; Europaeus (yellow card) 55' | Stadium: Tali halli TN; Attendance: 253; Referee: Oliver Reitala |

| 21 February 2026 5 | HJK | 3–1 | TPS | Helsinki |
| 14:00 EET (UTC+2) | Kirilov 7' (yellow card) 56'; Borchers 37'; Ring (yellow card) 68'; Pukki 72' | Report | Zaal 26'; Ikonen (yellow card) 61' | Stadium: Tali halli TN; Attendance: 500; Referee: Dennis Antamo |

==== Knockout Stage ====
| 14 March 2026 Semi-final | Oulu | 2–1 | HJK | Helsinki |
| 14:00 EET (UTC+2) | Ghezali 61'; Körkkö 77'; Silander (yellow card) 90+6'; Kaukua (yellow card) 90+6' | Report | Ylitolva (yellow card) 21'; Kirilov (yellow card) 45+1'; Lingman (yellow card) 70'; Mero 85'; Ring (yellow card) 90+6' | Stadium: Tali halli TN; Attendance: 600; Referee: Lassi Siukkola |

=== UEFA Conference League ===
==== Qualifying rounds ====
| 23 July 2026 Second qualifying round 1st leg | HJK (Finland) | 5–0 | (Northern Ireland) Coleraine | Helsinki, Finland |
| 19:00 EEST (UTC+3) | Möller 12'; Ring (yellow card) 23'; Mentu 32'; Mero 47'; Pukki 80', 82' | Report | Doherty (yellow card) 80' | Stadium: Töölö Football Stadium; Attendance: 4,287; Referee: Novak Simović (Serbia) |

| 30 July 2026 Second qualifying round 2nd leg | Coleraine (Northern Ireland) | 0–3 (0–8 agg.) | (Finland) HJK | Larne, Northern Ireland |
| 21:45 EEST (UTC+3) | Cooper (yellow card) 54' | Report | Mero 12'; Cicale 34'; Guèye 53' | Stadium: Inver Park; Attendance: 1,028; Referee: Seth Galia (Gibraltar) |
Note: Coleraine played their home match at Inver Park in Larne, rather than at their regular home ground, the The Showgrounds in Coleraine, which did not fulfil UEFA requirements.

| 6 August 2026 Third qualifying round 1st leg | HJK (Finland) | 1–1 | (Scotland) Motherwell | Helsinki, Finland |
| 19:00 EEST (UTC+3) | Ylitolva (yellow card) 56'; Möller (yellow card) 58'; Pukki 71' | Report | Lowry (yellow card) 24'; Priestman (yellow card) 52'; Maswanhise 64' (pen.); Girdwood-Reich (yellow card) 81' | Stadium: Töölö Football Stadium; Attendance: 7,023; Referee: Dalibor Černý (Czech Republic) |

| 13 August 2026 Third qualifying round 2nd leg | Motherwell (Scotland) | 2–0 (3–1 agg.) | (Finland) HJK | Motherwell, Scotland |
| 21:30 EEST (UTC+3) | Said 47', 60' | Report | Cicale (yellow card) 43'; Ring (yellow card) 57' | Stadium: Fir Park; Attendance: 8,185; Referee: Michal Očenáš (Slovakia) |

== Squad statistics ==
As of match played 8 November 2026

=== Appearances and goals ===
| No. | Pos | Nat | Player | Total | | Veikkausliiga | | Finnish Cup | | League Cup | | Conference League | |
| No. | Pos | Nat | Player | Apps | Goals | Apps | Goals | Apps | Goals | Apps | Goals | Apps | Goals |
|---|---|---|---|---|---|---|---|---|---|---|---|---|---|
| 1 | GK | (Finland) FIN | Jesse Öst | 17 | 0 | 8+1 | 0 | 3 | 0 | 4 | 0 | 1 | 0 |
| 3 | DF | (France) FRA | Till Cissokho | 28 | 0 | 14+3 | 0 | 2 | 0 | 5 | 0 | 3+1 | 0 |
| 4 | MF | (Finland) FIN | Alexander Ring | 38 | 5 | 22+4 | 3 | 3 | 1 | 2+3 | 1 | 3+1 | 0 |
| 6 | DF | (Finland) FIN | Ville Tikkanen | 40 | 2 | 27 | 2 | 3 | 0 | 4+2 | 0 | 4 | 0 |
| 7 | MF | (England) ENG | Alfie Cicale | 40 | 8 | 21+8 | 5 | 1+3 | 2 | 3+1 | 0 | 2+1 | 1 |
| 8 | MF | (Finland) FIN | Pyry Mentu | 37 | 2 | 21+4 | 1 | 2+1 | 0 | 5+1 | 0 | 3 | 1 |
| 9 | FW | (Denmark) DEN | Mads Borchers | 40 | 25 | 20+10 | 22 | 3+2 | 2 | 2 | 1 | 2+1 | 0 |
| 10 | MF | (Finland) FIN | Lucas Lingman | 38 | 0 | 19+6 | 0 | 3+2 | 0 | 5 | 0 | 2+1 | 0 |
| 11 | MF | (Finland) FIN | Martin Kirilov | 34 | 6 | 9+15 | 1 | 3+1 | 3 | 2+1 | 2 | 1+2 | 0 |
| 13 | DF | (Finland) FIN | Kaius Simojoki | 28 | 1 | 11+6 | 1 | 1 | 0 | 5+1 | 0 | 3+1 | 0 |
| 14 | DF | (Denmark) DEN | Leonel Montano | 35 | 3 | 27+1 | 2 | 3 | 1 | 1 | 0 | 3 | 0 |
| 15 | MF | (Finland) FIN | Jere Kallinen | 29 | 0 | 9+11 | 0 | 3 | 0 | 3+2 | 0 | 0+1 | 0 |
| 16 | MF | (Finland) FIN | Antton Nylund | 3 | 0 | 0+1 | 0 | 0 | 0 | 1+1 | 0 | 0 | 0 |
| 17 | DF | (Finland) FIN | Nikolai Alho | 10 | 2 | 6+3 | 2 | 0+1 | 0 | 0 | 0 | 0 | 0 |
| 19 | FW | (Finland) FIN | David Ezeh | 14 | 3 | 5+4 | 1 | 2 | 2 | 1+2 | 0 | 0 | 0 |
| 20 | FW | (Finland) FIN | Teemu Pukki | 42 | 13 | 18+11 | 6 | 3+1 | 1 | 3+2 | 3 | 1+3 | 3 |
| 22 | MF | (Finland) FIN | Liam Möller | 38 | 9 | 20+8 | 4 | 2+2 | 3 | 2+1 | 1 | 2+1 | 1 |
| 24 | DF | (Finland) FIN | Emil Leveälahti | 11 | 1 | 2+3 | 0 | 2+1 | 1 | 1+1 | 0 | 0+1 | 0 |
| 26 | MF | (Finland) FIN | Lassi Lappalainen | 29 | 5 | 3+19 | 4 | 2+1 | 1 | 0+1 | 0 | 0+3 | 0 |
| 29 | MF | (Finland) FIN | Santeri Haarala | 20 | 5 | 13+2 | 5 | 0+1 | 0 | 0 | 0 | 3+1 | 0 |
| 30 | GK | (Finland) FIN | Jasper Samooja | 4 | 0 | 4 | 0 | 0 | 0 | 0 | 0 | 0 | 0 |
| 31 | DF | (Serbia) SRB | Mihailo Bogićević | 23 | 1 | 14+2 | 1 | 3 | 0 | 3+1 | 0 | 0 | 0 |
| 32 | MF | (Senegal) SEN | Mouhamed Guèye | 13 | 2 | 4+4 | 1 | 1+1 | 0 | 0 | 0 | 1+2 | 1 |
| 44 | GK | (Croatia) CRO | Matej Marković | 26 | 0 | 20 | 0 | 2 | 0 | 1 | 0 | 3 | 0 |
| 49 | MF | (Finland) FIN | Otto Hannula | 1 | 0 | 0 | 0 | 0 | 0 | 0+1 | 0 | 0 | 0 |
| 61 | FW | (Finland) FIN | Valo Konttas | 2 | 0 | 0 | 0 | 0+2 | 0 | 0 | 0 | 0 | 0 |
| 62 | MF | (Finland) FIN | Leevi Palmula | 2 | 0 | 0+1 | 0 | 0+1 | 0 | 0 | 0 | 0 | 0 |
| 71 | FW | (Finland) FIN | Jay De Nascimento | 1 | 0 | 0 | 0 | 0 | 0 | 0+1 | 0 | 0 | 0 |
| 77 | MF | (Finland) FIN | Joona Veteli | 7 | 1 | 0+7 | 1 | 0 | 0 | 0 | 0 | 0 | 0 |
| 87 | MF | (Finland) FIN | Nicklas Kroupkin | 2 | 0 | 0 | 0 | 0+1 | 0 | 0+1 | 0 | 0 | 0 |
| 91 | FW | (Finland) FIN | Roni Hudd | 7 | 1 | 0 | 0 | 0+2 | 1 | 2+3 | 0 | 0 | 0 |
| 92 | DF | (Finland) FIN | Mustafa Ameen | 2 | 1 | 0 | 0 | 1+1 | 1 | 0 | 0 | 0 | 0 |
Players from Klubi-04 who appeared:
Players away from the club on loan:
| 28 | DF | (Finland) FIN | Miska Ylitolva | 28 | 1 | 13+4 | 1 | 3 | 0 | 5+1 | 0 | 2 | 0 |
Trialists:
| 18 | MF | (Nigeria) NGR | Clinton Jephta | 2 | 1 | 0 | 0 | 0 | 0 | 1+1 | 1 | 0 | 0 |
| 30 | GK | (Morocco) MAR | Issam El Maach | 1 | 0 | 0 | 0 | 0 | 0 | 1 | 0 | 0 | 0 |
Players who left HJK during the season:
| 2 | DF | (England) ENG | Brooklyn Lyons-Foster | 17 | 1 | 10+2 | 1 | 2+1 | 0 | 1+1 | 0 | 0 | 0 |
| 5 | DF | (England) ENG | Amara Nallo | 3 | 0 | 2 | 0 | 0 | 0 | 0 | 0 | 1 | 0 |
| 14 | MF | (Finland) FIN | Matias Ritari | 2 | 0 | 0 | 0 | 0 | 0 | 1+1 | 0 | 0 | 0 |
| 18 | FW | (Finland) FIN | Toivo Mero | 27 | 8 | 6+9 | 1 | 3 | 4 | 3+2 | 1 | 4 | 2 |
| 91 | FW | (Finland) FIN | Ville Vuorinen | 2 | 0 | 0 | 0 | 0 | 0 | 0+2 | 0 | 0 | 0 |
| 95 | FW | (Finland) FIN | Stanislav Baranov | 2 | 0 | 0 | 0 | 0 | 0 | 0+2 | 0 | 0 | 0 |

=== Goal scorers ===
| Place | Position | Nation | Number | Name | Veikkausliiga | Finnish Cup | League Cup | Conference League | Total |
|---|---|---|---|---|---|---|---|---|---|
| 1 | FW | (Denmark) | 9 | Mads Borchers | 22 | 2 | 1 | 0 | 25 |
| 2 | FW | (Finland) | 20 | Teemu Pukki | 6 | 1 | 3 | 3 | 13 |
| 3 | MF | (Finland) | 22 | Liam Möller | 4 | 3 | 1 | 1 | 9 |
| 4 | MF | (England) | 7 | Alfie Cicale | 5 | 2 | 0 | 1 | 8 |
| 4 | FW | (Finland) | 18 | Toivo Mero | 1 | 4 | 1 | 2 | 8 |
| 6 | MF | (Finland) | 29 | Santeri Haarala | 6 | 0 | 0 | 0 | 6 |
| 6 | MF | (Finland) | 11 | Martin Kirilov | 1 | 3 | 2 | 0 | 6 |
| 8 | MF | (Finland) | 26 | Lassi Lappalainen | 4 | 1 | 0 | 0 | 5 |
| 8 | MF | (Finland) | 4 | Alexander Ring | 3 | 1 | 1 | 0 | 5 |
| 10 | DF | (Denmark) | 14 | Leonel Montano | 2 | 1 | 0 | 0 | 3 |
| 10 | FW | (Finland) | 19 | David Ezeh | 1 | 2 | 0 | 0 | 3 |
| 12 | DF | (Finland) | 6 | Ville Tikkanen | 2 | 0 | 0 | 0 | 2 |
| 12 | DF | (Finland) | 17 | Nikolai Alho | 2 | 0 | 0 | 0 | 2 |
| 12 | MF | (Senegal) | 32 | Mouhamed Guèye | 1 | 0 | 0 | 1 | 2 |
| 12 | MF | (Finland) | 8 | Pyry Mentu | 1 | 0 | 0 | 1 | 2 |
| 16 | DF | (Serbia) | 31 | Mihailo Bogićević | 1 | 0 | 0 | 0 | 1 |
| 16 | DF | (England) | 2 | Brooklyn Lyons-Foster | 1 | 0 | 0 | 0 | 1 |
| 16 | DF | (Finland) | 28 | Miska Ylitolva | 1 | 0 | 0 | 0 | 1 |
| 16 | MF | (Finland) | 13 | Kaius Simojoki | 1 | 0 | 0 | 0 | 1 |
| 16 | MF | (Finland) | 77 | Joona Veteli | 1 | 0 | 0 | 0 | 1 |
| 16 | DF | (Finland) | 24 | Emil Leveälahti | 0 | 1 | 0 | 0 | 1 |
| 16 | DF | (Finland) | 92 | Mustafa Ameen | 0 | 1 | 0 | 0 | 1 |
| 16 | FW | (Finland) | 91 | Roni Hudd | 0 | 1 | 0 | 0 | 1 |
| 16 | MF | (Nigeria) | 18 | Clinton Jephta | 0 | 0 | 1 | 0 | 1 |
| 16 | | | | Own goal | 0 | 1 | 0 | 0 | 1 |
| TOTALS | | | | | 66 | 24 | 10 | 9 | 109 |

=== Clean sheets ===
| Place | Position | Nation | Number | Name | Veikkausliiga | Finnish Cup | League Cup | Conference League | Total |
|---|---|---|---|---|---|---|---|---|---|
| 1 | GK | (Croatia) | 44 | Matej Marković | 7 | 0 | 0 | 1 | 8 |
| 2 | GK | (Finland) | 1 | Jesse Öst | 4 | 1 | 0 | 1 | 6 |
| 3 | GK | (Finland) | 30 | Jasper Samooja | 1 | 0 | 0 | 0 | 1 |
| TOTALS | | | | | 12 | 1 | 0 | 2 | 15 |

=== Disciplinary record ===
| Number | Nation | Position | Name | Veikkausliiga | | Finnish Cup | | League Cup | | Conference League | | Total | |
| Number | Nation | Position | Name | Yellow card | Red card | Yellow card | Red card | Yellow card | Red card | Yellow card | Red card | Yellow card | Red card |
| 1 | (Finland) | GK | Jesse Öst | 1 | 0 | 0 | 0 | 0 | 0 | 0 | 0 | 0 | 1 |
| 4 | (Finland) | MF | Alexander Ring | 3 | 0 | 0 | 0 | 2 | 0 | 2 | 0 | 7 | 0 |
| 6 | (Finland) | DF | Ville Tikkanen | 4 | 1 | 0 | 1 | 1 | 0 | 0 | 0 | 5 | 2 |
| 7 | (England) | MF | Alfie Cicale | 0 | 0 | 0 | 0 | 0 | 0 | 1 | 0 | 1 | 0 |
| 8 | (Finland) | MF | Pyry Mentu | 3 | 0 | 0 | 0 | 1 | 0 | 0 | 0 | 4 | 0 |
| 9 | (Denmark) | FW | Mads Borchers | 2 | 0 | 0 | 0 | 0 | 0 | 0 | 0 | 2 | 0 |
| 10 | (Finland) | MF | Lucas Lingman | 3 | 0 | 2 | 0 | 1 | 0 | 0 | 0 | 6 | 0 |
| 11 | (Finland) | MF | Martin Kirilov | 7 | 0 | 0 | 0 | 2 | 0 | 0 | 0 | 9 | 0 |
| 13 | (Finland) | DF | Kaius Simojoki | 1 | 0 | 0 | 0 | 0 | 0 | 0 | 0 | 1 | 0 |
| 14 | (Denmark) | DF | Leonel Montano | 2 | 0 | 2 | 0 | 0 | 0 | 0 | 0 | 4 | 0 |
| 17 | (Finland) | DF | Nikolai Alho | 1 | 0 | 1 | 0 | 0 | 0 | 0 | 0 | 2 | 0 |
| 19 | (Finland) | FW | David Ezeh | 0 | 0 | 0 | 0 | 1 | 0 | 0 | 0 | 1 | 0 |
| 22 | (Finland) | MF | Liam Möller | 1 | 0 | 0 | 0 | 0 | 0 | 1 | 0 | 2 | 0 |
| 24 | (Finland) | DF | Emil Leveälahti | 1 | 0 | 1 | 0 | 0 | 0 | 0 | 0 | 2 | 0 |
| 31 | (Serbia) | DF | Mihailo Bogićević | 4 | 1 | 0 | 0 | 1 | 0 | 0 | 0 | 5 | 1 |
| 32 | (Senegal) | MF | Mouhamed Guèye | 1 | 0 | 0 | 0 | 0 | 0 | 0 | 0 | 1 | 0 |
| 44 | (Croatia) | GK | Matej Marković | 1 | 0 | 0 | 0 | 0 | 0 | 0 | 0 | 1 | 0 |
| 91 | (Finland) | FW | Roni Hudd | 0 | 0 | 1 | 0 | 0 | 0 | 0 | 0 | 1 | 0 |
Players from Klubi-04:
Players away on loan:
| 28 | (Finland) | DF | Miska Ylitolva | 0 | 0 | 1 | 0 | 1 | 0 | 1 | 0 | 3 | 0 |
Players who left HJK during the season:
| 2 | (England) | DF | Brooklyn Lyons-Foster | 1 | 0 | 0 | 0 | 0 | 1 | 0 | 0 | 1 | 1 |
| 18 | (Finland) | FW | Toivo Mero | 2 | 0 | 0 | 0 | 0 | 0 | 0 | 0 | 2 | 0 |
| TOTALS | | | | 37 | 2 | 8 | 1 | 10 | 1 | 5 | 0 | 60 | 4 |
