= Clinton Jephta =

Nigerian footballer

Personal information
- Full name: Clinton Degol Jephta
- Date of birth: 21 October 2006 (age 20)
- Position: Winger

Team information
- Current team: Inter Turku
- Number: 16

Youth career
- One Rocket

Senior career*
Years	Team	Apps	(Gls)
2023–2024	Niger Tornadoes	36	(8)
2024–2025	Enyimba	8	(3)
2025–2026	Niger Tornadoes	12	(2)
2026–	Inter Turku	26	(3)
2026–	Inter Turku II	1	(0)

International career
2025	Nigeria U20	6	(0)
- * Club domestic league appearances and goals as of 12 November 2026

Clinton Degol Jephta (born 21 October 2006) is a Nigerian professional footballer who currently plays as a winger for the Finnish Veikkausliiga team Inter Turku.

Known for his pace, dribbling ability and attacking instinct, Jephta emerged as one of the promising young players in the Nigeria Premier Football League (NPFL) before gaining international exposure with Nigeria's U-20 national team, the Flying Eagles.

== Club career ==
=== Early career ===
Jephta started his football career in Nigeria's grassroots football system, where his pace and ability to play in wide attacking areas quickly distinguished him among his peers. His performances at youth level helped him earn a move to Nigeria Nationwide League One side FC One Rocket, where he quickly progressed to Nigeria Premier League side Niger Tornadoes. After spending one season with Niger Tornadoes, he joined Nigeria's most successful football club Enyimba, before returning to Niger Tornadoes a year later on a free transfer. In May 2024, Jephta won the NPFL player of the month.

In March 2026, after trials with Strømsgodset IF, HJK, and FC Inter Turku, Jephta officially joined Inter on a 4-month loan contract with an option to buy. He made his debut for Inter in a Finnish League Cup match against FC Lahti on February 14, before his transfer was finalised. On May 9, he scored his first goal for the club in a 2-0 win over FF Jaro. Following the successful loan spell, his contract was made permanent until December 2028, for a five-figure transfer fee. On 23 August, his deal was extended until the end of 2029.

== International career ==
=== Nigeria U-20 ===
Jephta's performances at club level earned him a place in Nigeria's U-20 national team. He was part of the squad that competed in the 2024 WAFU B U-20 Championship, where Nigeria delivered a strong performance and reached the final. During the tournament, Jephta was widely regarded as one of the standout performers in the Nigerian team, contributing significantly to the team's attacking play.

Following regional success, he was included in Nigeria's squad for the U-20 Africa Cup of Nations in 2025. The Flying Eagles eventually finished third in the tournament after defeating host nation Egypt in a penalty shootout. Jephta expressed confidence during the competition that the team had the ambition and quality to challenge for the continental title, reflecting the belief within the squad during the campaign.

== Career statistics ==
As of 22 August 2026

Appearances and goals by club, season and competition
Club	Season	League			National cup (Note: Includes Finnish Cup)		League cup (Note: Includes Finnish League Cup)		Continental		Total	
Club	Season	Division	Apps	Goals	Apps	Goals	Apps	Goals	Apps	Goals	Apps	Goals
Niger Tornadoes	2023–24	NPFL	36	8	–		–		–		36	8
Enyimba	2024–25	NPFL	8	3	–		–		2 (Note: Appearances in CAF Confederation Cup)	0	10	3
Niger Tornadoes	2025–26	NPFL	12	2	–		–		–		12	2
HJK	2026	Veikkausliiga	–		–		2	1	–		2	1
Inter Turku	2026	Veikkausliiga	15	2	3	1	1	0	7 (Note: Appearances in UEFA Conference League)	3	26	6
Inter Turku II	2026	Ykkönen	1	0	–		–		–		1	0
Career total			72	15	3	1	3	1	9	3	87	20
