= Kaius Simojoki =

Finnish footballer (born 2006)

Personal information
- Full name: Kaius Tito Ilmari Simojoki
- Date of birth: 21 March 2006 (age 20)
- Place of birth: Sarajevo, Bosnia and Herzegovina
- Height: 1.80 m (5 ft 11 in)
- Position: Left back

Team information
- Current team: HJK
- Number: 13

Youth career
- 2010–2014: PPJ
- 2015–2020: HJK
- 2021–2023: KäPa

Senior career*
Years	Team	Apps	(Gls)
2023	KäPa	0	(0)
2023	→ Futura (loan)	2	(0)
2023	→ Klubi 04 (loan)	3	(0)
2024–	Klubi 04	25	(2)
2024–	HJK	48	(1)

International career^{‡}
2022	Finland U16	3	(0)
2022–2023	Finland U17	13	(0)
2023–2024	Finland U18	7	(0)
2024–	Finland U19	8	(0)
- * Club domestic league appearances and goals as of 12 November 2026 ‡ National team caps and goals as of 9 April 2025

Kaius Tito Simojoki (born 21 March 2006) is a Finnish professional footballer, playing as a left back for HJK Helsinki.

== Early years ==
Simojoki was born to Finnish parents in Sarajevo, Bosnia and Herzegovina, where his parents lived due to mother's work. After moving to Finland, he started football in a youth team of PPJ when aged four, and later joined HJK Helsinki youth sector, before moving to the renowned youth academy of Käpylän Pallo in Helsinki.

== Career ==
On 6 December 2022, KäPa announced the signing of Simojoki on a professional contract. In 2023, he featured briefly for the co-operation club FC Futura in Porvoo, before he was loaned out to the reserve team of HJK, Klubi 04, in the summer. After his loan spell, HJK exercised their option and acquired Simojoki from KäPa on a permanent contract for an undisclosed fee.

Simojoki was part of the HJK Helsinki youth squad in the 2023–24 UEFA Youth League campaign, playing all four matches against Malmö FF and Nantes.

== International career ==
Simojoki has represented Finland at various youth national team levels.

== Career statistics ==
As of 19 September 2026

Appearances and goals by club, season and competition
Club	Season	League			National cup (Note: Includes Suomen Cup)		League cup (Note: Includes Finnish League Cup)		Europe		Total	
Club	Season	Division	Apps	Goals	Apps	Goals	Apps	Goals	Apps	Goals	Apps	Goals
Käpylän Pallo	2023	Ykkönen	0	0	0	0	0	0	–		0	0
Futura (loan)	2023	Kakkonen	2	0	–		–		–		2	0
Klubi 04 (loan)	2023	Kakkonen	3	0	–		–		–		3	0
Klubi 04	2024	Ykkönen	25	2	–		–		–		25	2
HJK	2024	Veikkausliiga	0	0	0	0	2	0	0	0	2	0
HJK	2025	Veikkausliiga	31	0	3	0	4	0	3 (Note: Appearances in UEFA Conference League)	0	41	0
HJK	2026	Veikkausliiga	11	1	1	0	6	0	4	0	22	1
HJK	Total		42	1	4	0	12	0	7	0	65	1
Career total			72	3	4	0	12	0	7	0	95	3

== Honours ==
HJK

- Finnish Cup: 2025

Klubi 04

- Ykkönen: 2024
