= Toivo Mero =

Finnish footballer (born 2007)

Personal information
- Date of birth: 7 October 2007 (age 19)
- Place of birth: Finland
- Height: 1.88 m (6 ft 2 in)
- Position: Winger

Team information
- Current team: De Graafschap

Youth career
- 2011: HPS
- 2011–2024: HJK

Senior career*
Years	Team	Apps	(Gls)
2024–2025	Klubi 04	37	(12)
2025–2026	HJK	25	(1)
2026–	De Graafschap	3	(0)

International career^{‡}
2022	Finland U16	5	(3)
2023	Finland U17	14	(1)
2024–2025	Finland U18	3	(0)
2025–	Finland U19	10	(1)
- * Club domestic league appearances and goals as of 30 August 2026 ‡ National team caps and goals as of 30 July 2026

Toivo Mero (born 9 October 2007) is a Finnish professional footballer who plays as a winger for Eerste Divisie club De Graafschap.

== Career ==
On 16 November 2023, after advancing through the club's youth sector and academy, Mero signed a three-year deal with HJK Helsinki.

On 14 August 2026, Mero joined De Graafschap.

== Career statistics ==
As of 30 August 2026

Appearances and goals by club, season and competition
Club	Season	League			National cup (Note: Includes Finnish Cup)		League cup (Note: Includes Ykkösliigacup and Finnish League Cup)		Europe		Total	
Club	Season	Division	Apps	Goals	Apps	Goals	Apps	Goals	Apps	Goals	Apps	Goals
Klubi 04	2024	Ykkönen	22	8	–		–		–		22	8
Klubi 04	2025	Ykkösliiga	15	4	0	0	4	3	–		19	7
Klubi 04	Total		37	12	0	0	4	3	0	0	41	15
HJK	2025	Veikkausliiga	10	0	2	1	1	0	0	0	13	1
HJK	2026	Veikkausliiga	15	1	2	4	5	1	4 (Note: Appearances in UEFA Conference League)	2	26	8
HJK	Total		25	1	4	5	6	1	4	2	39	9
De Graafschap	2026–27	Eerste Divisie	3	0	0	0	–		–		3	0
Career total			65	13	4	5	10	4	4	2	83	24

== Honours ==
HJK

- Finnish Cup: 2025

Klubi 04

- Ykkönen: 2024
