= Eket Township Stadium =

Stadium in Eket, Nigeria

Coordinates: 4.6407°N 7.9340°E

Eket Township Stadium is a multi-purpose stadium situated in Eket, a local government area in Akwa Ibom State, Nigeria. The stadium is located in the heart of the Eket metropolis.

The stadium was inaugurated in 2022 and is primarily used for football matches. The stadium serves as the home ground for the FC One Rocket and Vandrezzer FC. The stadium has a seating capacity of 17,000 and is equipped with floodlights, an indoor sports hall, and an artificial playing surface.

In 2023, Akwa United temporarily relocated their regular season home games to Eket Stadium due to the busy schedule of Godswill Akpabio International Stadium in Uyo, which was being used for international matches.
