= Mads Borchers =

Danish footballer (born 2002)

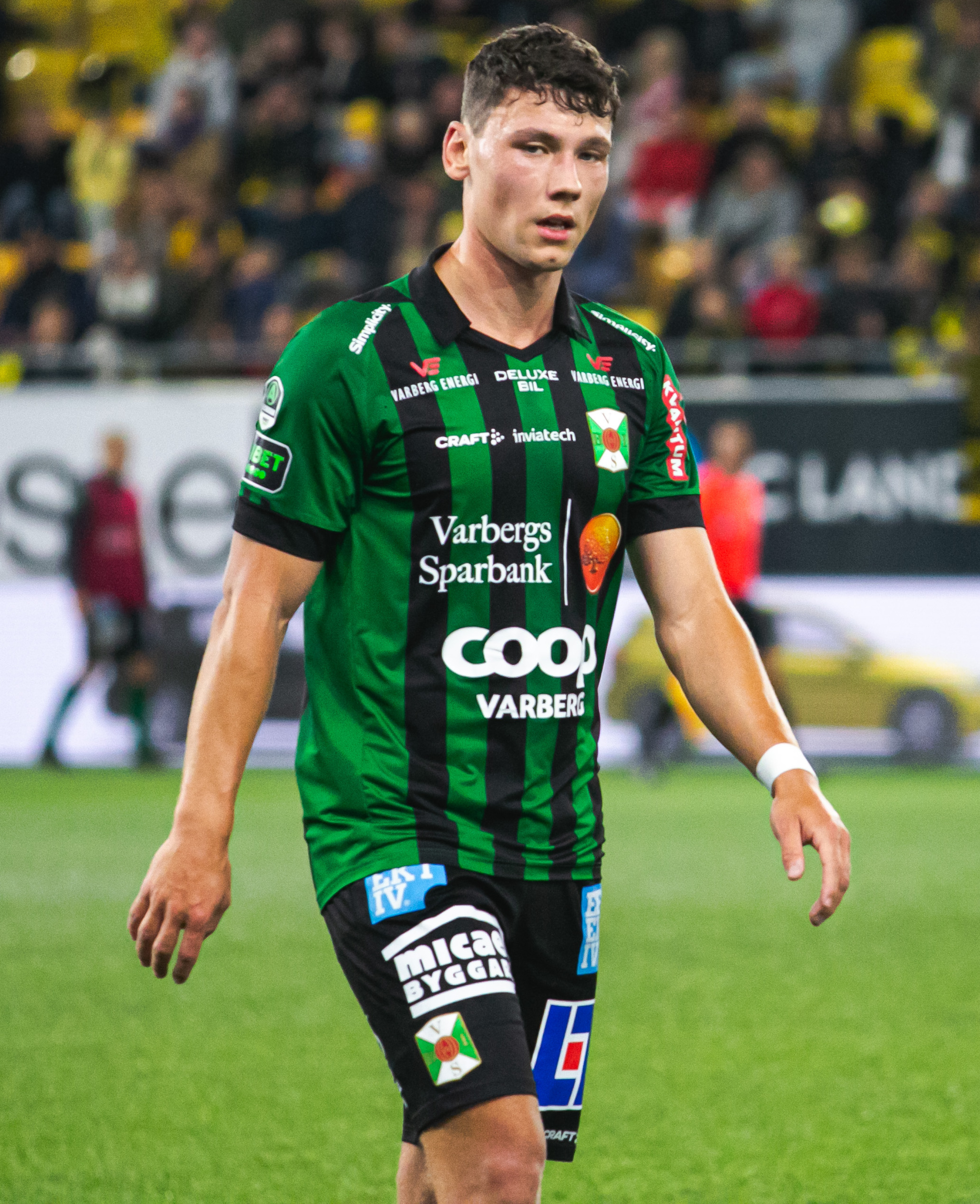
- Borchers with Varbergs BoIS in 2023

Personal information
- Date of birth: 18 June 2002 (age 24)
- Place of birth: Sønderborg, Denmark
- Height: 1.88 m (6 ft 2 in)
- Position: Centre forward

Team information
- Current team: HJK
- Number: 9

Youth career
- –2017: SUB Sønderborg
- 2017–2021: Esbjerg fB

Senior career*
Years	Team	Apps	(Gls)
2021–2022	Esbjerg fB	3	(0)
2022	→ 07 Vestur (loan)	25	(12)
2023	HB Tórshavn	16	(6)
2023	Varbergs BoIS	13	(1)
2024–2025	VPS	22	(15)
2025–2026	FC Ingolstadt	15	(1)
2026	→ HJK (loan)	15	(7)
2026–	HJK	15	(15)
- * Club domestic league appearances and goals as of 12 November 2026

Mads Borchers (born 18 June 2002) is a Danish professional footballer who plays as a centre forward for Finnish club HJK.

== Club career ==
Born in Sønderborg, Borchers started playing football in a youth sector of a local club SUB Sønderborg, and joined Esbjerg fB in 2017.

Borchers started his senior career with Esbjerg fB in second-tier Danish 1st Division in 2021. He was loaned out to 07 Vestur in Faroe Islands Premier League for the 2022 season. During the season, he made 25 league appearances and scored 12 goals for 07 Vestur.

In 2023, he joined another Faroese club HB Tórshavn. During the first half of the season, Borchers made 21 appearances and scored seven goals for the club in all competitions combined.

In July 2023, he moved to Swedish Allsvenskan side Varbergs BoIS.

In March 2024, Borchers moved to Finland and signed with Veikkausliiga club Vaasan Palloseura (VPS) on 15 March. He scored ten goals in his 16 first league appearances, but missed the second half of the season due to injury. On 19 August, his contract was extended for the 2025 season. On 5 April 2025, Borchers scored a hat-trick in the season opening home match against AC Oulu, helping his side to win the game 4–3, after having trailed by two.

On 11 July 2025, Borchers signed with FC Ingolstadt in Germany. On 9 February 2026, Borchers returned to Finland and joined HJK on loan with an option to buy.

== Career statistics ==
As of 30 October 2026

Appearances and goals by club, season and competition
Club	Season	League			National cup (Note: Includes Faroe Islands Cup, Svenska Cupen, Suomen Cup)		League cup (Note: Includes Finnish League Cup and Bavarian Cup)		Europe		Total	
Club	Season	Division	Apps	Goals	Apps	Goals	Apps	Goals	Apps	Goals	Apps	Goals
Esbjerg fB	2020–21	Danish 1st Division	2	0	–		–		–		2	0
Esbjerg fB	2021–22	Danish 1st Division	1	0	–		–		–		1	0
Esbjerg fB	Total		3	0	0	0	0	0	0	0	3	0
07 Vestur (loan)	2022	Faroe Islands Premier League	25	12	3	3	–		–		28	15
HB Tórshavn	2023	Faroe Islands Premier League	16	6	3	1	–		2 (Note: Includes UEFA Europa Conference League)	0	21	7
Varbergs BoIS	2023	Allsvenskan	13	1	3	0	–		–		16	1
VPS	2024	Veikkausliiga	16	10	1	0	0	0	0	0	17	10
VPS	2025	Veikkausliiga	6	5	1	0	3	1	–		10	6
VPS	Total		22	15	2	0	3	1	0	0	27	16
FC Ingolstadt	2025–26	3. Liga	15	1	0	0	2	1	–		17	2
HJK (loan)	2026	Veikkausliiga	15	7	4	2	2	1	1	0	22	10
HJK	2026	Veikkausliiga	13	12	1	0	–		2	0	16	12
Career total			122	54	16	6	7	3	5	0	150	63
