= Amara Nallo =

English footballer (born 2006)

Personal information
- Full name: Amara Nallo
- Date of birth: 18 November 2006 (age 19)
- Place of birth: Enfield, England
- Height: 1.86 m (6 ft 1 in)
- Position: Centre-back

Team information
- Current team: Liverpool
- Number: 65

Youth career
- –2023: West Ham United
- 2023–2024: Liverpool

Senior career*
Years	Team	Apps	(Gls)
2024–	Liverpool	0	(0)
2026	→ HJK (loan)	2	(0)

International career^{‡}
2024–	England U18	5	(0)
2024–	England U19	1	(0)
2025–	England U20	1	(0)
- * Club domestic league appearances and goals as of 7 August 2026 00:15 (UTC) ‡ National team caps and goals as of 15:37, 15 November 2025 (UTC)

Amara Nallo (born 18 November 2006) is an English professional footballer who plays as a centre-back for Premier League club Liverpool.

== Club career ==
=== West Ham United ===
A product of the West Ham United academy, he signed scholarship terms with the club in early 2023.

=== Liverpool ===
He joined fellow Premier League side Liverpool in August 2023. He made quick progress through the youth ranks in his first season with the club. By November 2023, he had already played more games for the Liverpool under-21 side in Premier League 2 than he had for the under-18 side. He also drew praise from under-21 manager Barry Lewtas for his performances in the Premier League International Cup. He also played for Liverpool in the EFL Trophy.

On 28 February 2024, he was included in the Liverpool senior team's match day squad for the first time, named as a substitute against Southampton in the FA Cup. On 10 March 2024, he was included in the Liverpool senior team's match day squad for the first time in the Premier League, named as a substitute against Manchester City. On 29 January 2025, Nallo made his first-team debut for Liverpool, replacing Jayden Danns in the 83rd minute, in a 3–2 UEFA Champions League defeat against PSV Eindhoven, but was shown a direct red card 4 minutes later, in the 87th minute for denying a goalscoring opportunity.

On 29 October 2025 he made just his second appearance for the club after coming on for Alexis Mac Allister, in a 3–0 EFL Cup defeat at home against Crystal Palace, and after coming on as substitute was again sent off. In doing so, he became the first player in Liverpool's history to be sent off in consecutive appearances for the club.

=== Loan to HJK ===
On 24 July 2026 it was announced that he had joined HJK on loan until the end of the 2026 Veikkausliiga season. On 3 October 2026, HJK announced that Nallo had returned to Liverpool, after suffering an injury that would see him miss the remainder of the Veikkausliiga season.

== International career ==
In March 2024, Nallo received his first call-up to the England U18 squad, for Pinatar Super Cup fixtures against Czechia, Germany and the Netherlands. He made his debut during a 2–1 win over Czechia at the Pinatar Arena on 20 March 2024.

On 12 October 2024, Nallo made his England U19 debut during a 4–1 win against Netherlands in Marbella.

On 14 November 2025, Nallo made his England U20 during a 1-1 draw with Japan at the Eco-Power Stadium.

== Style of play ==
West Ham under-16 coach Carlton Cole described Nallo as "a Rolls Royce of a centre-back". Cole also said he has a "high ceiling" with "a great left foot" who appears "elegant when he moves with the ball" and able to play the ball with "both feet".

== Personal life ==
Nallo is of Sierra Leonean descent.

== Career statistics ==
As of match played 16 August 2026

Appearances and goal by club, season and competition
Club	Season	League			Cup (Note: Includes the FA Cup and the Finnish Cup)		League Cup (Note: Includes the EFL Cup and the Finnish League Cup)		Europe		Other		Total	
Club	Season	Division	Apps	Goals	Apps	Goals	Apps	Goals	Apps	Goals	Apps	Goals	Apps	Goals
Liverpool U21	2023–24	—			—		—		—		3 (Note: Appearance(s) in EFL Trophy)	0	3	0
Liverpool U21	2024–25	—			—		—		—		1	0	1	0
Liverpool U21	2025–26	—			—		—		—		1	0	1	0
Liverpool U21	Total		—		—		—		—		5	0	5	0
Liverpool	2024–25	Premier League	0	0	0	0	0	0	1 (Note: Appearance in UEFA Champions League)	0	—		1	0
Liverpool	2025–26	Premier League	0	0	0	0	1	0	1	0	0	0	2	0
Liverpool	2026–27	Premier League	0	0	0	0	0	0	0	0	0	0	0	0
Total			0	0	0	0	1	0	2	0	5	0	8	0
HJK (loan)	2026	Veikkausliiga	2	0	0	0	0	0	1 (Note: Appearance in UEFA Conference League)	0	—		3	0
Career total			0	0	0	0	1	0	2	0	5	0	8	0
