= Mihailo Bogićević =

Serban footballer (born 1998)

Personal information
- Date of birth: 30 May 1998 (age 28)
- Place of birth: Lausanne, Switzerland
- Height: 1.91 m (6 ft 3 in)
- Position: Centre back

Team information
- Current team: HJK
- Number: 31

Youth career
- –2015: Team Vaud
- 2015–2017: Renens

Senior career*
Years	Team	Apps	(Gls)
2017–2019	Team Vaud	29	(1)
2019–2021	Loznica	32	(0)
2021–2025	Spartak Subotica	110	(1)
2025–	HJK	25	(1)
- * Club domestic league appearances and goals as of 12 November 2026

Mihailo Bogićević (Serbian: Михаило Богићевић; born 30 May 1998) is a Serbian professional footballer who plays as a centre back for Veikkausliiga club HJK Helsinki.

== Club career ==
Bogićević was born in Lausanne, Switzerland, where he started football.

Between 2021 and 2025, he played for Spartak Subotica in Serbian SuperLiga.

On 8 August 2025, he signed with HJK Helsinki in Finnish Veikkausliiga for a rumoured €150,000 fee.

== Career statistics ==
As of 22 April 2026

Appearances and goals by club, season and competition
Club	Season	League			National cup (Note: Includes Serbian Cup and Finnish Cup)		League cup (Note: Includes Finnish League Cup)		Europe		Total	
Club	Season	Division	Apps	Goals	Apps	Goals	Apps	Goals	Apps	Goals	Apps	Goals
Team Vaud	2017–18	Swiss 1. Liga	5	0	–		–		–		5	0
Team Vaud	2018–19	Swiss 1. Liga	24	1	–		–		–		24	1
Team Vaud	Total		29	1	0	0	0	0	0	0	29	1
Loznica	2020–21	Serbian First League	32	0	–		–		–		32	0
Spartak Subotica	2021–22	Serbian SuperLiga	35	0	0	0	–		–		35	0
Spartak Subotica	2022–23	Serbian SuperLiga	20	0	2	0	–		–		22	0
Spartak Subotica	2023–24	Serbian SuperLiga	20	0	0	0	–		–		20	0
Spartak Subotica	2024–25	Serbian SuperLiga	35	1	0	0	–		–		35	1
Spartak Subotica	2025–26	Serbian SuperLiga	0	0	0	0	–		–		0	0
Spartak Subotica	Total		110	1	2	0	0	0	0	0	112	1
HJK	2025	Veikkausliiga	7	0	2	0	0	0	0	0	9	0
HJK	2026	Veikkausliiga	3	1	0	0	4	0	0	0	7	1
HJK	Total		10	1	2	0	4	0	0	0	16	1
Career total			181	3	5	0	4	0	0	0	189	3

== Honours ==
HJK

- Finnish Cup: 2025
