= FC One Rocket =

Nigerian professional football club

FC One Rocket is a Nigerian professional football club based in Uyo, Akwa Ibom State, Nigeria. The club competes in the Nigeria Nationwide League, the third tier of club football in the Nigerian football league system.

== History ==
The club was founded in October 2020.

In 2024, FC One Rocket were relegated from the Nigeria National League (NNL) to Nigeria Nationwide League Division One (NLO1).

== Stadium ==
The team plays their home games at the Eket Township Stadium.

== Notable players ==
- Daniel Daga
- Clinton Jephta
