= Gabriel Europaeus =

Finnish footballer (born 2005)

Personal information
- Full name: Gabriel Onni Vilho Europaeus
- Date of birth: 14 May 2005 (age 21)
- Place of birth: Kirkkonummi, Finland
- Height: 1.93 m (6 ft 4 in)
- Position: Central midfielder

Team information
- Current team: Gnistan
- Number: 15

Youth career
- –2015: Honka
- 2015–2018: Käpylän Pallo
- 2018–2021: Honka
- 2021–2022: Lecce

Senior career*
Years	Team	Apps	(Gls)
2023	Honka II	9	(0)
2024–	Gnistan	76	(5)

International career^{‡}
2019	Finland U15	3	(0)
2026–	Finland U21	1	(0)
- * Club domestic league appearances and goals as of 13 November 2026 ‡ National team caps and goals as of 25 September 2026

Gabriel Onni Vilho Europaeus (born 14 May 2005) is a Finnish professional football player who plays as a central midfielder for Veikkausliiga side Gnistan.

== Club career ==
As a youth player, Europaeus has played for Honka, Käpylän Pallo, and Lecce in Italy. He made his senior debut with Honka's reserve team in the third-tier Kakkonen in 2023.

On 19 January 2024, Europaeus signed with IF Gnistan in Veikkausliiga. He debuted in the league on 19 May, aged 19, as a starter in a 0–0 draw against Kuopion Palloseura (KuPS). On 17 February 2025, he extended his deal until the end of 2026. On 27 April, Europaeus scored his first Veikkausliiga goal, in a home match against KuPS.

== Career statistics ==
As of 25 September 2026

Appearances and goals by club, season and competition
Club	Season	Division	League		National cup (Note: Includes Suomen Cup)		League cup (Note: Includes Finnish League Cup)		Europe		Total	
Club	Season	Division	Apps	Goals	Apps	Goals	Apps	Goals	Apps	Goals	Apps	Goals
Honka Akatemia	2023	Kakkonen	9	0	3	0	–		–		12	0
Gnistan	2024	Veikkausliiga	18	0	1	0	1	0	–		20	0
Gnistan	2025	Veikkausliiga	27	2	2	0	0	0	–		29	2
Gnistan	2026	Veikkausliiga	25	2	0	0	3	0	–		28	2
Gnistan	Total		70	4	3	0	4	0	0	0	77	4
Career total			79	4	6	0	4	0	0	0	89	4
