= Joona Veteli =

Finnish footballer (born 1995)

- Veteli with HJK in 2026

Personal information
- Full name: Joona Eemil Petteri Veteli
- Date of birth: 21 April 1995 (age 31)
- Place of birth: Kemi, Finland
- Height: 1.80 m (5 ft 11 in)
- Position: Midfielder

Team information
- Current team: HJK
- Number: 77

Youth career
- FC-88

Senior career*
| Years | Team | Apps | (Gls) |
| 2010–2012 | FC Kemi | 11 | (5) |
| 2011 | → PS Kemi (loan) | 2 | (0) |
| 2012–2014 | TP-47 | 61 | (5) |
| 2015 | Jaro | 27 | (0) |
| 2016 | PS Kemi | 28 | (0) |
| 2017–2019 | Fredrikstad | 69 | (16) |
| 2020–2021 | Ilves | 38 | (5) |
| 2022–2023 | KuPS | 29 | (7) |
| 2024–2026 | Ilves | 64 | (11) |
| 2026– | HJK | 7 | (1) |

International career^{‡}
| 2016 | Finland U21 | 3 | (0) |
- * Club domestic league appearances and goals as of 12 November 2026 ‡ National team caps and goals as of 25 February 2017

Joona Eemil Petteri Veteli (born 21 April 1995) is a Finnish football player who plays for Finnish Veikkausliiga side HJK. Veteli plays in the position of centre midfielder but can also operate as an attacking midfielder, defensive midfielder, right-back and winger.

== Club career ==
On 9 November 2021, he joined KuPS on a two-year contract. Veteli was named the Veikkausliiga Player of the Month in May 2023. His time with KuPS was plagued by injuries.

On 6 November 2023, Veteli returned to Ilves, signing a two-year deal with the club, starting in 2024. On 8 May 2025, his deal was extended until the end of 2027.

On 25 August 2026, he joined HJK Helsinki for an undisclosed fee.

== Career statistics ==
As of 17 May 2025

Appearances and goals by club, season and competition
| Club | Season | League | | | Cup (Note: Includes Suomen Cup and Norwegian Cup) | | League cup | | Europe | | Total | |
| Club | Season | Division | Apps | Goals | Apps | Goals | Apps | Goals | Apps | Goals | Apps | Goals |
|---|---|---|---|---|---|---|---|---|---|---|---|---|
| PS Kemi (loan) | 2011 | Ykkönen | 2 | 0 | – | | – | | – | | 2 | 0 |
| TP-47 | 2012 | Kakkonen | 11 | 1 | – | | – | | – | | 11 | 1 |
| TP-47 | 2013 | Kakkonen | 26 | 0 | 2 | 0 | – | | – | | 28 | 0 |
| TP-47 | 2014 | Kakkonen | 24 | 4 | – | | – | | – | | 24 | 4 |
| TP-47 | Total | | 61 | 5 | 2 | 0 | 0 | 0 | 0 | 0 | 63 | 5 |
| Jaro | 2015 | Veikkausliiga | 27 | 0 | 1 | 0 | 4 | 2 | – | | 32 | 2 |
| JBK | 2015 | Kakkonen | 1 | 0 | – | | – | | – | | 1 | 0 |
| PS Kemi | 2016 | Veikkausliiga | 28 | 0 | 2 | 0 | 5 | 1 | – | | 35 | 1 |
| Fredrikstad | 2017 | 1. divisjon | 25 | 3 | 1 | 0 | – | | – | | 26 | 3 |
| Fredrikstad | 2018 | 2. divisjon | 22 | 8 | 1 | 0 | – | | – | | 23 | 8 |
| Fredrikstad | 2019 | 2. divisjon | 22 | 5 | 2 | 0 | – | | – | | 24 | 5 |
| Fredrikstad | Total | | 69 | 16 | 4 | 0 | 0 | 0 | 0 | 0 | 73 | 16 |
| Fredrikstad 2 | 2017 | 4. divisjon | 1 | 0 | – | | – | | – | | 1 | 0 |
| Fredrikstad 2 | 2018 | 4. divisjon | 1 | 0 | – | | – | | – | | 1 | 0 |
| Fredrikstad 2 | Total | | 2 | 0 | 0 | 0 | 0 | 0 | 0 | 0 | 2 | 0 |
| Ilves | 2020 | Veikkausliiga | 11 | 3 | 3 | 1 | – | | 1 (Note: Appearances in UEFA Europa League) | 1 | 15 | 5 |
| Ilves | 2021 | Veikkausliiga | 27 | 2 | 3 | 0 | – | | – | | 30 | 2 |
| Ilves | Total | | 38 | 5 | 6 | 1 | 0 | 0 | 1 | 1 | 45 | 7 |
| KuPS | 2022 | Veikkausliiga | 15 | 2 | 2 | 0 | 0 | 0 | 0 | 0 | 17 | 2 |
| KuPS | 2023 | Veikkausliiga | 14 | 5 | 3 | 0 | 6 | 1 | 0 | 0 | 23 | 6 |
| KuPS | Total | | 29 | 7 | 5 | 0 | 6 | 1 | 0 | 0 | 40 | 8 |
| Ilves | 2024 | Veikkausliiga | 25 | 3 | 1 | 0 | 0 | 0 | 4 (Note: Appearances in UEFA Conference League) | 0 | 30 | 3 |
| Ilves | 2025 | Veikkausliiga | 7 | 2 | 0 | 0 | 2 | 0 | 0 | 0 | 9 | 2 |
| Ilves | Total | | 32 | 5 | 1 | 0 | 2 | 0 | 4 | 0 | 39 | 5 |
| Career total | | | 289 | 38 | 21 | 1 | 16 | 4 | 5 | 1 | 331 | 44 |

== Honours ==
KuPS

- Veikkausliiga runner-up: 2022, 2023
- Finnish Cup: 2022

Ilves

- Veikkausliiga runner-up: 2024

Individual

- Veikkausliiga Team of the Year: 2024
- Veikkausliiga Player of the Month: May 2023
