= Alfie Cicale =

English footballer (born 2002)

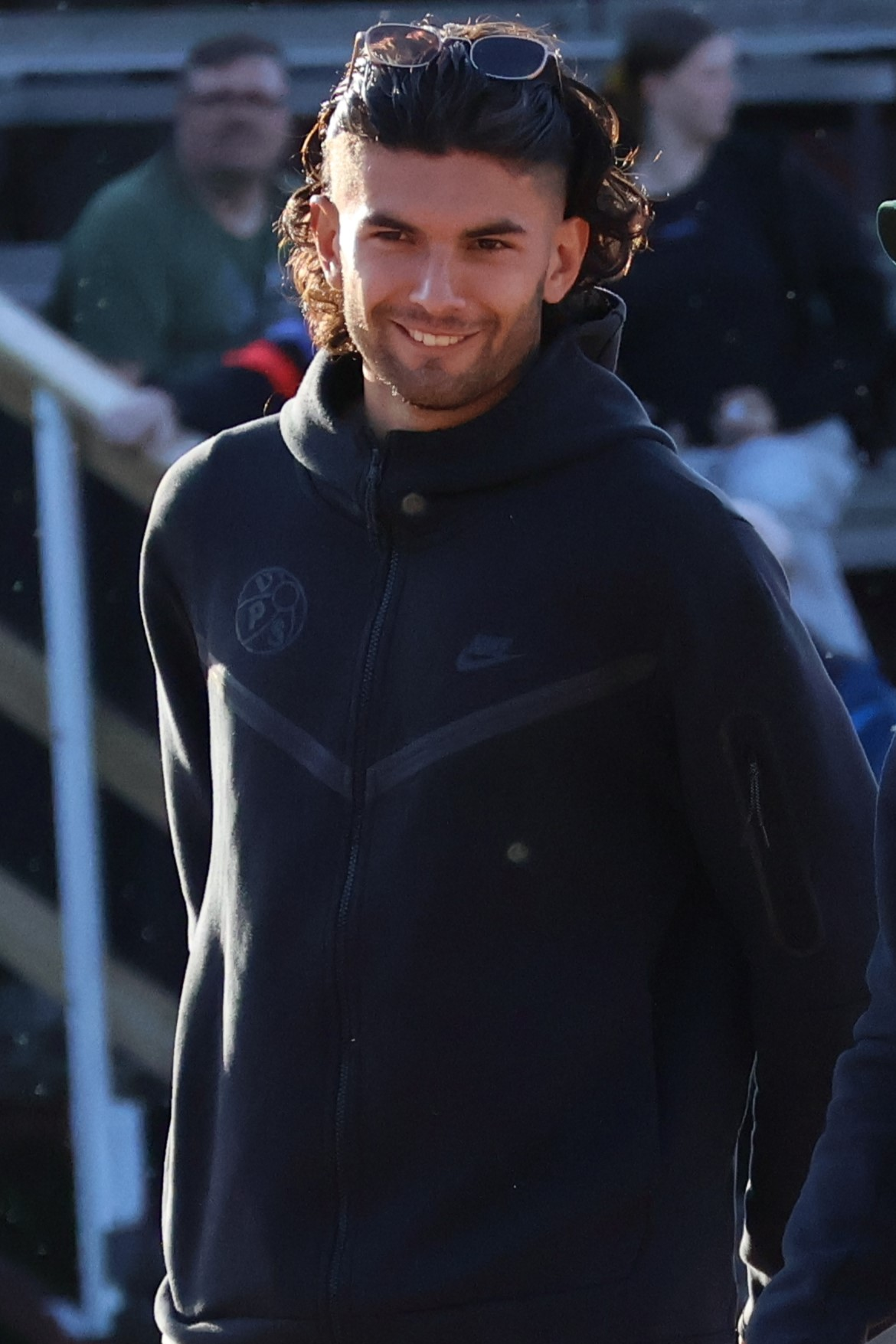
- Cicale in 2025

Personal information
- Full name: Alfie Theodore Cicale
- Date of birth: 19 April 2002 (age 24)
- Place of birth: England
- Height: 1.82 m (6 ft 0 in)
- Positions: Winger; wing-back

Team information
- Current team: HJK
- Number: 7

Youth career
- 2014–2017: Norwich City

Senior career*
Years	Team	Apps	(Gls)
2024–2025	VPS	41	(2)
2026–	HJK	29	(5)
- * Club domestic league appearances and goals as of 12 November 2026

Alfie Theodore Cicale (born 19 April 2002) is an English professional footballer who plays as a winger for Veikkausliiga club HJK.

== Early career ==
Cicale joined the Norwich City youth academy when he was aged 12. Cicale played with Norwich for three years until he resigned from the academy and continued to study and play football in a small local club with his friends. In 2020, Cicale started studying history in Oxford and playing in the University team. During his time at Oxford, his other sport was sprinting. He graduated in 2023 with "a first-class history degree".

== Club career ==
After graduating, Cicale trialled with Northampton Town and Swiss club Neuchâtel Xamax, but was not able to get a contract due to his lack of competitive playing experience and due to visa difficulties. He also spent time with Finnish second-tier club TPS, but could not be registered as the transfer window had already closed.

=== VPS ===
In March 2024, Cicale was invited for a trial to Finnish top-tier Veikkausliiga club Vaasan Palloseura (VPS). On 21 March 2024, he signed a two-year deal with the club, his first professional contract after playing college football in England. He debuted with his new club on 7 April, in the opening game of the 2024 Veikkausliiga season against Haka, helping his side to get a 2–1 away victory. On 27 April, Cicale scored his first professional senior goal, a winning goal in a 2–1 victory over AC Oulu in the league. He also made an appearance for VPS in the UEFA Conference League qualifiers against Žalgiris, but was forced to miss the second leg due to a delay in Lithuanian visa process.

=== HJK ===
In December 2025, it was announced that Cicale would join HJK on a two-year contract, with an option for a third year, for an undisclosed fee.

== Personal life ==
Born in England to an English mother and an Italian father, Cicale grew up in North London. He is a Tottenham Hotspur supporter.

== Career statistics ==
As of match played 2 November 2026

Appearances and goals by club, season and competition
Club	Season	League			National cup (Note: Includes Finnish Cup)		League cup (Note: Includes Finnish League Cup)		Europe		Total	
Club	Season	Division	Apps	Goals	Apps	Goals	Apps	Goals	Apps	Goals	Apps	Goals
VPS	2024	Veikkausliiga	19	1	0	0	0	0	1 (Note: appearances and goals in the UEFA Conference League)	0	20	1
VPS	2025	Veikkausliiga	22	1	2	0	2	0	–		26	1
VPS	Total		41	2	2	0	2	0	1	0	46	2
HJK	2026	Veikkausliiga	28	5	4	2	4	0	3	1	39	8
Career total			62	7	6	2	6	0	4	1	78	10
