= Mikko Pitkänen =

Finnish footballer (born 1997)

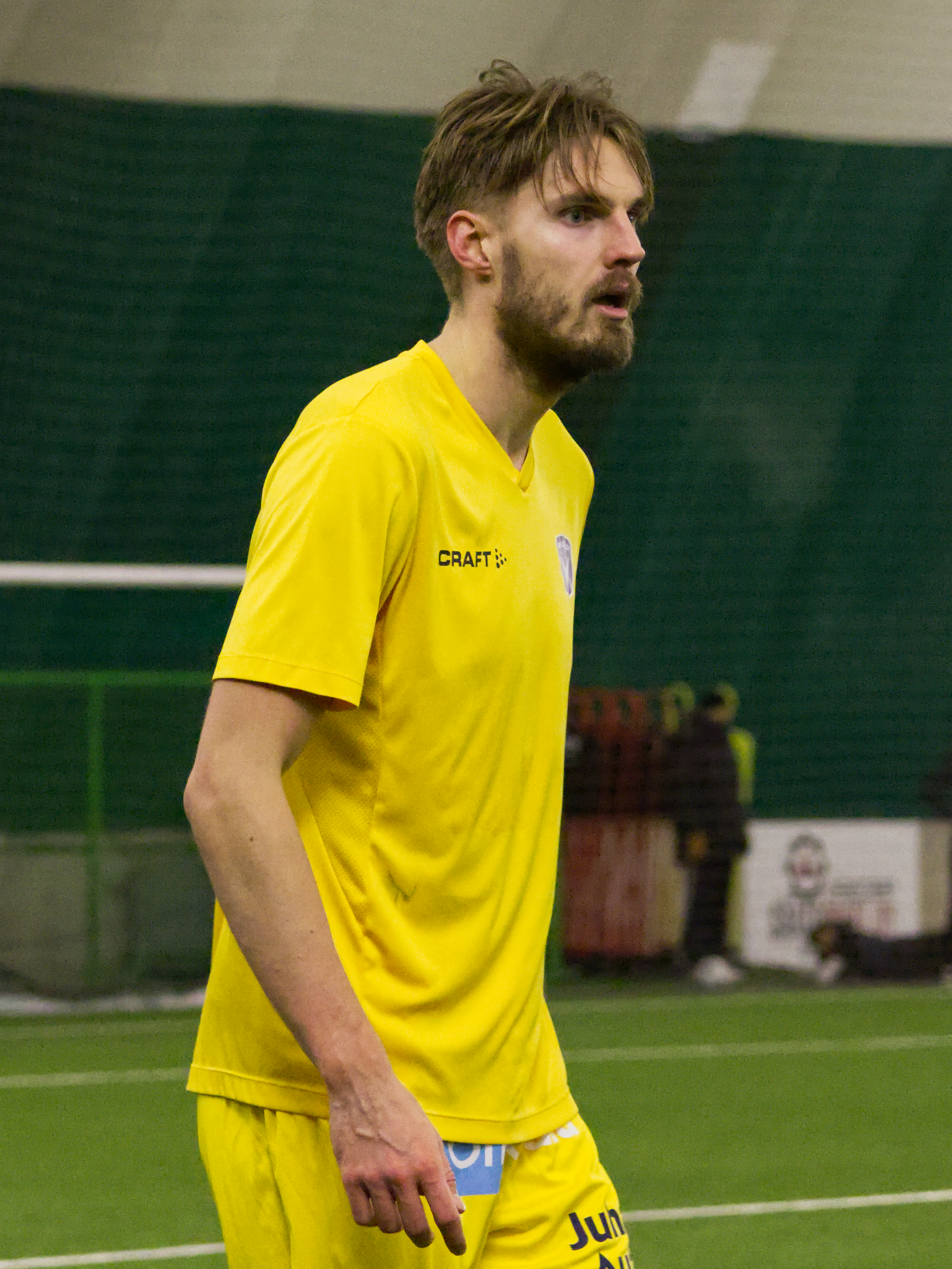
- Pitkänen in 2025.

Personal information
- Date of birth: 2 January 1997 (age 29)
- Place of birth: Kuopio, Finland
- Height: 1.98 m (6 ft 6 in)
- Position: Centre back

Team information
- Current team: AC Oulu
- Number: 5

Youth career
- KuPS

Senior career*
Years	Team	Apps	(Gls)
2014–2019	KuPS	12	(0)
2015–2019	→ KuFu-98	51	(3)
2018	→ Gnistan (loan)	7	(1)
2020	AC Kajaani	19	(1)
2021–2024	VPS	100	(5)
2025–	AC Oulu	42	(2)
- * Club domestic league appearances and goals as of 12 November 2026

Mikko Pitkänen (born 2 January 1997) is a Finnish professional footballer who plays for Veikkausliiga club AC Oulu, as a defender.

== Career ==
Pitkänen started his career in his hometown club Kuopion Palloseura (KuPS), making his Veikkausliiga debut with KuPS first team in the 2014 season.

On 29 December 2019, Ykkönen side AC Kajaani confirmed that they had signed Pitkänen on a contract for the 2020 season.

On 5 January 2021, Pitkänen joined Ykkönen side Vaasan Palloseura (VPS). They went on to win the Ykkönen title and were promoted to Veikkausliiga for the 2022 season and his deal was extended.

On 31 October 2024, Veikkausliiga club AC Oulu announced the signing of Pitkänen for the 2025 and 2026 seasons, with an option for 2027.

== Career statistics ==
As of 26 February 2025

Appearances and goals by club, season and competition
Club	Season	League			Cup (Note: Includes Suomen Cup)		League cup (Note: Includes Finnish League Cup)		Europe		Other		Total	
Club	Season	Division	Apps	Goals	Apps	Goals	Apps	Goals	Apps	Goals	Apps	Goals	Apps	Goals
KuPS	2014	Veikkausliiga	2	0	1	0	2	0	–		–		5	0
KuPS	2015	Veikkausliiga	0	0	0	0	0	0	–		–		0	0
KuPS	2016	Veikkausliiga	0	0	0	0	1	0	–		–		1	0
KuPS	2017	Veikkausliiga	0	0	1	0	–		–		–		1	0
KuPS	2018	Veikkausliiga	10	0	2	0	–		0	0	–		12	0
KuPS	2019	Veikkausliiga	0	0	2	0	–		0	0	–		2	0
KuPS	Total		12	0	6	0	3	0	0	0	0	0	21	0
KuFu-98	2015	Kolmonen	0	0	–		–		–		2 (Note: Appearances in UEFA Regions' Cup)	0	2	0
KuFu-98	2016	Kakkonen	12	2	–		–		–		–		12	2
KuFu-98	2017	Kakkonen	17	0	–		–		–		–		17	0
KuFu-98	2018	Kakkonen	9	0	–		–		–		–		9	0
KuFu-98	2019	Kakkonen	13	1	–		–		–		–		13	1
KuFu-98	Total		51	3	0	0	0	0	0	0	2	0	53	3
Gnistan (loan)	2019	Kakkonen	7	1	–		–		–		–		7	1
AC Kajaani	2020	Ykkönen	19	1	4	0	–		–		–		23	1
VPS	2021	Ykkönen	21	0	4	0	–		–		–		25	0
VPS	2022	Veikkausliiga	29	2	3	0	1	0	–		–		33	2
VPS	2023	Veikkausliiga	28	1	3	1	4	0	–		–		35	2
VPS	2024	Veikkausliiga	22	2	2	0	4	0	1 (Note: Appearance(s) in UEFA Conference League)	0	–		29	2
VPS	Total		100	5	12	1	9	0	1	0	0	0	122	6
AC Oulu	2025	Veikkausliiga	0	0	0	0	3	0	–		–		3	0
Career total			189	10	22	1	15	0	1	0	2	0	229	11

== Honours ==
VPS

- Ykkönen: 2021
