= Martin Kirilov =

Finnish footballer (born 2007)

Personal information
- Full name: Martin Elias Kirilov
- Date of birth: 8 August 2007 (age 19)
- Place of birth: Finland
- Position: Attacking midfielder

Team information
- Current team: HJK
- Number: 11

Youth career
- EBK
- Honka
- 2016–2023: HJK
- 2023–2026: Torino U18

Senior career*
Years	Team	Apps	(Gls)
2026–	HJK	24	(1)

International career^{‡}
2021	Finland U15	2	(1)
2023	Finland U16	6	(4)
2023–	Finland U17	11	(3)
2024–	Finland U18	5	(0)
2025–	Finland U19	4	(0)
- * Club domestic league appearances and goals as of 3 November 2026 ‡ National team caps and goals as of 6 September 2025

Martin Elias Kirilov (born 8 August 2007) is a Finnish footballer who plays as a midfielder for Veikkausliiga club HJK Helsinki.

== Youth career ==
Kirilov started to play football with EBK and Honka in Espoo, before joining the HJK youth academy when he was nine years old.

On 9 May 2023, Kirilov signed his first professional contract with HJK, on a three-year deal.

In August 2023, Kirilov signed with Italian club Torino FC on a three-year deal, for an undisclosed fee. He was first registered to the club's U17 academy team.

== Club career ==
In February 2026, Kirilov was bought back by his former club HJK Helsinki for an undisclosed fee.

== International career ==
A regular youth international, Kirilov has represented Finland at under-15, under-16 and under-17 age brackets, scoring at every level.

Kirilov was part of the Finland U16 squad that won the friendly tournament Baltic Cup in July 2023, scoring two goals in three games.

On 4 October 2023, he was named in the Finland U17 squad in the 2024 UEFA European Under-17 Championship qualification tournament. In the tournament Finland drew with Ukraine and Germany 2–2 and 1–1, respectively, before winning Liechtenstein 3–0, placing 2nd in the group and advancing to the Elite round. Kirilov scored once and provided two assists in three games.
