= Antti-Ville Räisänen =

Finnish footballer (born 1998)

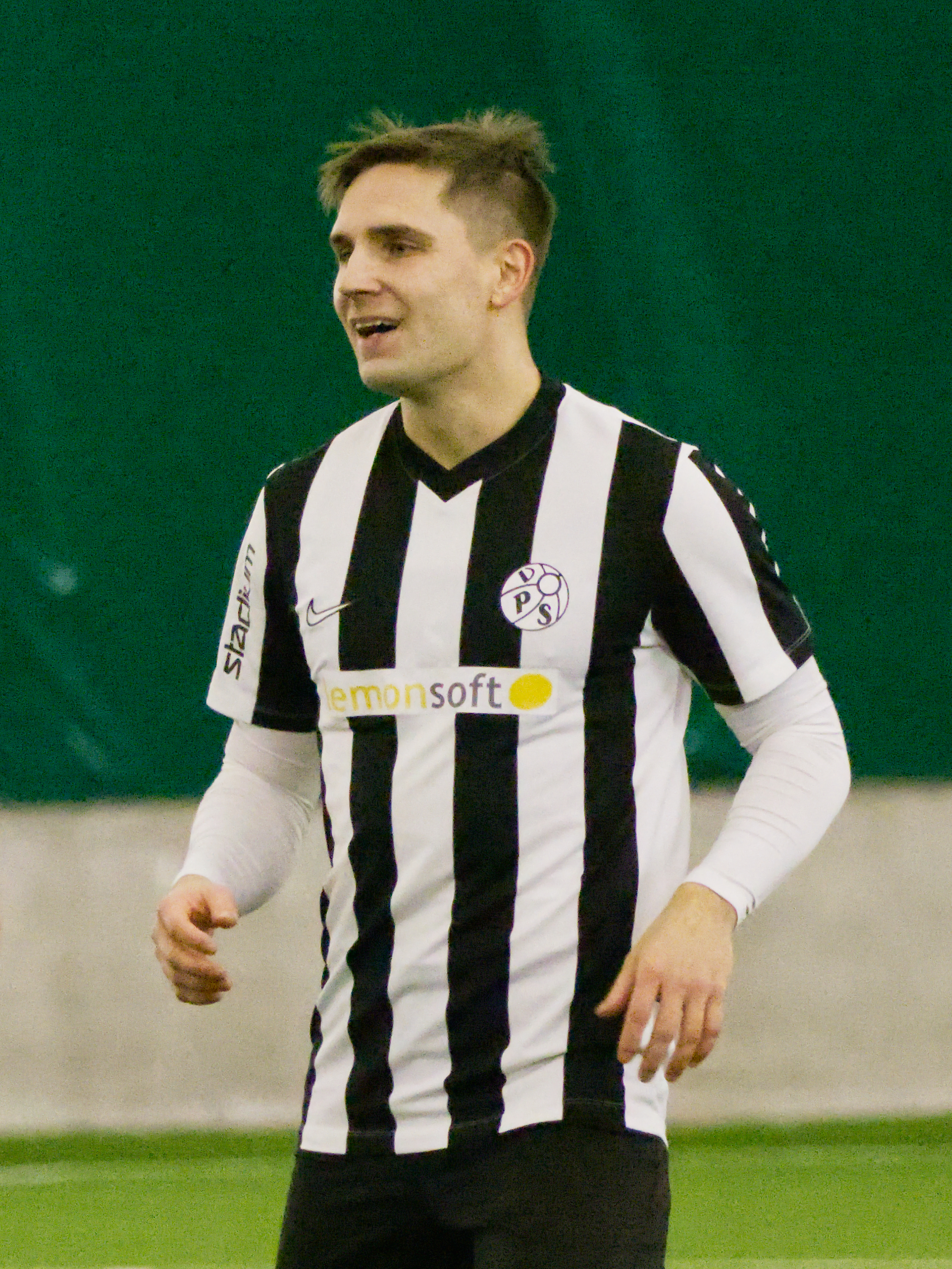
- Räisänen with VPS in 2026

Personal information
- Full name: Antti-Ville Albin Räisänen
- Date of birth: 4 April 1998 (age 28)
- Place of birth: Joroinen, Finland
- Height: 1.80 m (5 ft 11 in)
- Position: Central midfielder

Team information
- Current team: VPS
- Number: 34

Youth career
- KuPS

Senior career*
Years	Team	Apps	(Gls)
2015–2017	KuPS	2	(0)
2015–2017	KuFu-98	32	(3)
2018	AC Kajaani	20	(0)
2019–2021	MP	63	(8)
2022–	VPS	129	(6)

International career
- Finland U18
- * Club domestic league appearances and goals as of 13 November 2026

Antti-Ville Albin Räisänen (born 4 April 1998) is a Finnish professional footballer who plays as a midfielder for Veikkausliiga club Vaasan Palloseura (VPS).

== Club career ==
Räisänen has played in the youth sector of Kuopion Palloseura (KuPS), debuting with the club's first team in Veikkausliiga in the 2015 season.

After a season with AC Kajaani in second-tier Ykkönen, Räisänen joined Mikkelin Palloilijat (MP) starting in 2019. He was later named the captain of his team.

In early 2022, Räisänen joined a newly promoted Veikkausliiga club Vaasan Palloseura (VPS). His deal was extended first on 11 October 2022, and again on 25 September 2023.

== Career statistics ==
As of 27 February 2025

Appearances and goals by club, season and competition
Club	Season	League			Cup		League cup		Europe		Other		Total	
Club	Season	Division	Apps	Goals	Apps	Goals	Apps	Goals	Apps	Goals	Apps	Goals	Apps	Goals
KuPS	2015	Veikkausliiga	2	0	0	0	0	0	–		–		2	0
KuPS	2016	Veikkausliiga	0	0	0	0	4	0	–		–		4	0
KuPS	2017	Veikkausliiga	0	0	1	0	–		–		–		1	0
KuPS	Total		2	0	1	0	4	0	0	0	0	0	7	0
KuFu-98	2015	Kolmonen	0	0	–		–		–		1 (Note: Appearance(s) in UEFA Regions' Cup)	0	1	0
KuFu-98	2016	Kakkonen	15	1	–		–		–		–		15	1
KuFu-98	2017	Kakkonen	17	2	–		–		–		–		17	2
KuFu-98	Total		32	3	0	0	0	0	0	0	1	0	33	3
AC Kajaani	2018	Ykkönen	21	0	5	0	–		–		–		26	0
MP	2019	Kakkonen	24	2	–		–		–		–		24	2
MP	2020	Ykkönen	19	5	5	1	–		–		–		24	6
MP	2021	Ykkönen	20	1	3	1	–		–		–		23	2
MP	Total		63	8	8	2	0	0	0	0	0	0	71	10
VPS	2022	Veikkausliiga	20	2	3	0	3	0	–		–		26	2
VPS	2023	Veikkausliiga	28	0	4	0	1	0	–		–		33	0
VPS	2024	Veikkausliiga	25	1	2	0	4	1	2 (Note: Appearances in UEFA Conference League)	0	–		33	2
VPS	2025	Veikkausliiga	0	0	0	0	5	0	–		–		5	0
VPS	Total		73	3	9	0	13	1	2	0	0	0	97	4
VPS Akatemia	2022	Kolmonen	1	0	–		–		–		–		1	0
Career total			192	14	23	2	17	1	2	0	1	0	235	17

== Honours ==
MP

- Kakkonen Group A: 2019
