= Leonel Montano =

Danish footballer (born 1999)

Personal information
- Full name: Leonel Caicedo Montano Dahl
- Date of birth: 2 October 1999 (age 27)
- Place of birth: Nørrebro, Denmark
- Height: 1.90 m (6 ft 3 in)
- Positions: Left-back; left winger

Team information
- Current team: HJK (on loan from Silkeborg)
- Number: 14

Youth career
- –2010: BK Skjold
- 2010–2017: B.93

Senior career*
Years	Team	Apps	(Gls)
2017–2019	B.93	46	(12)
2020–2021	Vejle	14	(3)
2020–2021	→ Fredericia (loan)	13	(3)
2021–2025	Esbjerg fB	101	(12)
2025–	Silkeborg	13	(0)
2026–	HJK (loan)	28	(2)
- * Club domestic league appearances and goals as of 3 November 2026

Leonel Caicedo Montano Dahl (born 2 October 1999) is a Danish professional footballer who plays as a left-back for Veikkausliiga club HJK, on loan from Danish Superliga club Silkeborg.

== Career ==
=== Club career ===
==== Early career ====
Montano started his career as a youngster in BK Skjold, before switching to B.93 at the age of 11. Here he played his way up through the club's youth academy and later became a regular member of the club's senior squad. Montano made his debut for B.93 as a 17-year-old on 1 March 2017, against Copenhagen in a Danish Cup match. After his debut, Montano was firmly promoted to the first team and quickly became an important player for the Danish 2nd Division squad, where he proved to be a goal-scoring midfielder.

==== Vejle ====
On 4 July 2019, Danish 1st Division club Vejle confirmed that they had signed Montano on a deal until June 2023, effective from January 2020. In his first six months he played 8 games, scoring 3 goals and 1 assist, contributing to Vejle's promotion to the 2020–21 Danish Superliga. After promotion to the Danish Superliga, playing time became more scarce for Montano: 6 appearances in the league and 3 matches in the cup tournament with 2 goals.

===== Loan to Fredericia =====
In search of more playing time, Montano was loaned out to Danish 1st Division club Fredericia on 1 February 2021. Here Montano scored 3 goals in 13 games.

==== Esbjerg fB ====
On 1 September 2021, Montano joined Esbjerg fB on a contract until June 2025. In the 2023–24 season, Montano was converted to left-back. Before then, Montano had always played in the offensive positions, from striker, to winger, to midfielder.

==== Silkeborg ====
On 11 June 2025, Danish Superliga club Silkeborg confirmed that Montano had joined the club on a free transfer on a deal running until June 2029. On 20 July, he made his debut for the club in the opening match of the season in the Superliga against Brøndby.

===== Loan to HJK =====
On 19 February 2026, Montano was loaned out to Veikkausliiga club HJK until the end of 2026.

== Personal life ==
Leonel Montano was born and raised in Denmark with a Danish mother and Colombian father.
