= Ville Tikkanen (footballer) =

Finnish footballer (born 1999)

Personal information
- Full name: Ville Matti Verneri Tikkanen
- Date of birth: 8 August 1999 (age 27)
- Place of birth: Oulu, Finland
- Height: 1.83 m (6 ft 0 in)
- Position: Centre back

Team information
- Current team: HJK
- Number: 6

Youth career
- –2015: Tervarit
- 2016: OLS
- 2017: SJK

Senior career*
Years	Team	Apps	(Gls)
2017–2020	SJK II	32	(1)
2017–2024	SJK	131	(2)
2025–	HJK	57	(2)

International career^{‡}
2018	Finland U19	3	(0)
2025–	Finland	1	(0)
- * Club domestic league appearances and goals as of 12 November 2026 ‡ National team caps and goals as of 5 September 2025

Ville Matti Verneri Tikkanen (born 8 August 1999) is a Finnish professional footballer who plays for as a centre back for Finnish club HJK and the Finland national team.

== Club career ==
Born in Oulu, Tikkanen played in the youth sectors of Tervarit and OLS, before moving to SJK in Seinäjoki in 2017, and signing a three-year deal.

On 30 October 2023, the club exercised their option to keep Tikkanen in SJK for the 2024 Veikkausliiga season. On 27 March 2024, Tikkanen was named the captain of his team.

After being linked with Scottish club St. Johnstone, on 18 November 2024, Tikkanen signed with HJK Helsinki on a two-year deal.

== International career ==
After representing Finland at youth international levels, Tikkanen received his first call-up to the Finland national team on 12 March 2025 by head coach Jacob Friis, for the 2026 FIFA World Cup qualification matches against Malta and Lithuania.

== Career statistics ==
=== Club ===
As of 31 March 2025

Appearances and goals by club, season and competition
Club	Season	League			Finnish Cup		Finnish League Cup		Europe		Total	
Club	Season	Division	Apps	Goals	Apps	Goals	Apps	Goals	Apps	Goals	Apps	Goals
SJK Akatemia	2017	Kolmonen	16	1	—		—		—		16	1
SJK Akatemia	2018	Kakkonen	5	0	—		—		—		5	0
SJK Akatemia	2019	Kakkonen	10	0	—		—		—		10	0
SJK Akatemia	2020	Ykkönen	1	0	—		—		—		1	0
SJK Akatemia	Total		32	1	0	0	0	0	0	0	32	1
SJK Seinäjoki	2017	Veikkausliiga	0	0	2	0	—		0 (Note: Appearance(s) in UEFA Europa League)	0	2	0
SJK Seinäjoki	2018	Veikkausliiga	12	0	3	0	—		—		15	0
SJK Seinäjoki	2019	Veikkausliiga	7	0	3	0	—		—		10	0
SJK Seinäjoki	2020	Veikkausliiga	14	0	2	0	—		—		16	0
SJK Seinäjoki	2021	Veikkausliiga	24	1	0	0	—		—		24	1
SJK Seinäjoki	2022	Veikkausliiga	20	1	2	0	3	0	3 (Note: Appearance(s) in UEFA Europa Conference League)	1	28	2
SJK Seinäjoki	2023	Veikkausliiga	27	0	0	0	2	1	—		29	1
SJK Seinäjoki	2024	Veikkausliiga	27	0	4	0	5	0	—		36	0
SJK Seinäjoki	Total		131	2	16	0	10	1	3	1	160	4
HJK Helsinki	2025	Veikkausliiga	0	0	0	0	5	0	0	0	5	0
Career total			163	3	16	0	15	1	3	1	198	5

=== International ===
As of match played 7 September 2025

National team	Year	Apps	Goals
Finland	2025	1	0
Total		1	0

== Honours ==
HJK

- Finnish Cup: 2025
