= Timo Zaal =

Dutch football player

Personal information
- Date of birth: 9 February 2004 (age 22)
- Place of birth: Leeuwarden, The Netherlands
- Height: 1.84 m (6 ft 0 in)

Team information
- Current team: TPS
- Number: 22

Youth career
- 2019–2022: SC Heerenveen
- 2023–2025: Feyenoord

Senior career*
Years	Team	Apps	(Gls)
2022–2023	Heerenveen	3	(0)
2026-	TPS	26	(2)

International career^{‡}
2022	Netherlands U19	4	(0)
- * Club domestic league appearances and goals as of 13 November 2026 ‡ National team caps and goals as of 04 October 2022

Timo Zaal (born 9 February 2004) is a Dutch footballer, who currently plays for TPS in the Veikkausliiga.

== Personal life ==
Zaal is from Leeuwarden, his uncles Pieter and Arnold Herder played football for SC Cambuur.

== Career ==
Zaal made his professional debut appearing as a substitute in a 3-1 Eredivisie victory as SC Heerenveen played FC Groningen at the Abe Lenstra Stadion on 10 April 2022. Zaal commented afterwards that it was good for him to get the debut out of the way because the expectations had long been for him that it would be a question of “when, not if”, he would eventually play for the first team.

On 14 July 2023, Zaal was signed by Feyenoord and was assigned to the youth U21 team of the club. He left Feyenoord upon the conclusion of his contract in 2025.

Zaal joined Finnish side TPS in February 2026.

== International career ==
In September 2022 Zaal was included in the Dutch U19 squad.
