= Osku Maukonen =

Finnish footballer (born 2007)

Personal information
- Date of birth: 15 February 2007 (age 19)
- Place of birth: Finland
- Height: 1.84 m (6 ft 0 in)
- Position: Goalkeeper

Team information
- Current team: HJK
- Number: 33

Youth career
- Reipas Lahti
- –2023: Lahti

Senior career*
Years	Team	Apps	(Gls)
2023	Reipas Lahti	11	(0)
2023–2026	Lahti	67	(0)
2026–	HJK	0	(0)

International career^{‡}
2021	Finland U15	2	(0)
2022–2023	Finland U16	4	(0)
2023–	Finland U17	11	(0)
2024	Finland U18	4	(0)
2024–2025	Finland U19	11	(0)
2026–	Finland U21	1	(0)
- * Club domestic league appearances and goals as of 12 November 2026 ‡ National team caps and goals as of 31 August 2026

Osku Maukonen (born 15 February 2007) is a Finnish professional footballer who plays as a goalkeeper for Veikkausliiga club HJK.

== Club career ==
=== FC Lahti ===
On 14 November 2022, Maukonen signed his first professional contract with his hometown club FC Lahti on a three-year deal, at the age of 15. Maukonen made his debut in Veikkausliiga with FC Lahti on 3 June 2023, after being named in the starting line-up against Ilves. Maukonen became the youngest ever goalkeeper to debut in the highest level in Finland, at the age of 16 years, 3 months and 19 days. He also became the first player born 2007 to debut in the league. His contract was extended on 8 October 2024 until the end of 2026.

== International career ==
On 4 October 2023, Maukonen was named in the Finland U17 squad in the 2024 UEFA European Under-17 Championship qualification tournament. In the tournament Finland drew with Ukraine and Germany, 2–2 and 1–1 respectively, before winning Liechtenstein 3–0, placing 2nd in the group and advancing to the Elite round. Maukonen played all three games.

== Career statistics ==
As of 12 November 2026

Appearances and goals by club, season and competition
Club	Season	League			National cup (Note: Includes Finnish Cup)		League cup (Note: Includes Finnish League Cup and Ykkösliigacup)		Europe		Total	
Club	Season	Division	Apps	Goals	Apps	Goals	Apps	Goals	Apps	Goals	Apps	Goals
Reipas Lahti	2023	Kakkonen	8	0	—		—		—		8	0
Lahti	2023	Veikkausliiga	3	0	1	0	0	0	—		4	0
Lahti	2024	Veikkausliiga	14	0	2	0	3	0	—		19	0
Lahti	2025	Ykkösliiga	26	0	0	0	3	0	–		29	0
Lahti	2026	Veikkausliiga	24	0	2	0	2	0	–		28	0
Lahti	Total		67	0	5	0	8	0	0	0	80	0
Career total			75	0	5	0	8	0	0	0	88	0
