= Topi Järvinen =

Finnish footballer (born 1994)

Personal information
- Full name: Topi Eemeli Järvinen
- Date of birth: 26 September 1994 (age 32)
- Place of birth: Jyväskylä, Finland
- Height: 1.77 m (5 ft 10 in)
- Positions: Midfielder; winger

Team information
- Current team: JäPS
- Number: 22

Youth career
- JJK

Senior career*
Years	Team	Apps	(Gls)
2012–2014	JJK	52	(5)
2012	→ Warkaus JK (loan)	9	(4)
2015	Mjølner	9	(0)
2015	Vaajakoski	5	(0)
2016	JJK	11	(0)
2017	Kultsu	10	(4)
2018	Vaajakoski	21	(9)
2019	AC Kajaani	21	(3)
2020	Jaro	21	(6)
2021–2023	Gnistan	53	(8)
2023	→ NJS (loan)	1	(0)
2024	EPS	9	(1)
2024–	JäPS	13	(1)

International career
2011	Finland U17	1	(0)
2012	Finland U19	3	(0)
2013	Finland U20	4	(0)
- * Club domestic league appearances and goals as of 24 November 2025

Topi Järvinen (born 26 September 1994) is a Finnish professional footballer who plays as a midfielder for Ykkösliiga club JäPS.

== Career ==
Järvinen was born in Jyväskylä and started his career with a local club JJK Jyväskylä. He debuted in top-tier Veikkausliiga with the club's first team in the 2012 season.

In March 2015, Järvinen moved to Norway and joined 2. divisjon club Mjølner, but returned to Finland in July. During the remainder of the season, he played for Vaajakoski, and returned to JJK in February 2016.

He continued his career with Kultsu, AC Kajaani, Vaajakoski and Jaro.

During 2021–2023, Järvinen played for IF Gnistan in second-tier Ykkönen. After a short stint with Espoon Palloseura, he moved to Ykkösliiga club JäPS later in 2024.

== Career statistics ==
As of 17 March 2025

Appearances and goals by club, season and competition
Club	Season	League			Cup (Note: Includes Suomen Cup and Norwegian Cup)		League cup (Note: Includes Finnish League Cup, Ykköscup and Ykkösliigacup)		Total	
Club	Season	Division	Apps	Goals	Apps	Goals	Apps	Goals	Apps	Goals
JJK	2012	Veikkausliiga	4	1	–		–		4	1
JJK	2013	Veikkausliiga	27	1	2	1	3	0	32	2
JJK	2014	Ykkönen	21	3	1	0	–		22	3
JJK	Total		52	5	3	1	3	0	58	6
Warkaus JK (loan)	2012	Kakkonen	9	4	–		–		9	4
Mjølner	2015	2. divisjon	9	0	2	0	–		11	0
Vaajakoski	2015	Kakkonen	5	0	–		–		5	0
JJK	2016	Ykkönen	11	0	3	0	–		14	0
Villiketut (loan)	2016	Kolmonen	2	1	–		–		2	1
Kultsu	2017	Kakkonen	10	4	–		–		10	4
Vaajakoski	2018	Kakkonen	21	9	–		–		21	9
AC Kajaani	2019	Ykkönen	21	3	6	1	–		27	4
Jaro	2020	Ykkönen	21	6	–		–		21	6
Gnistan	2021	Ykkönen	25	4	–		–		25	4
Gnistan	2022	Ykkönen	18	2	2	0	3	0	23	2
Gnistan	2023	Ykkönen	10	2	1	0	4	0	15	2
Gnistan	Total		53	8	3	0	7	0	63	8
NJS (loan)	2023	Kakkonen	1	0	–		–		1	0
EPS	2024	Ykkönen	9	1	1	0	–		10	1
JäPS	2024	Ykkösliiga	5	1	–		–		5	1
JäPS	2025	Ykkösliiga	0	0	0	0	4	0	4	0
JäPS	Total		5	1	0	0	4	0	9	1
Career total			229	42	18	2	14	0	261	44
