= Severi Kähkönen =

Finnish footballer (born 2000)

Personal information
- Date of birth: 10 March 2000 (age 26)
- Place of birth: Kokkola, Finland
- Height: 1.87 m (6 ft 2 in)
- Position: Attacking midfielder

Team information
- Current team: Jaro
- Number: 66

Youth career
- –2015: KPV
- 2015–2018: Jaro

Senior career*
Years	Team	Apps	(Gls)
2016–2020	Jaro	44	(13)
2017–2020	JBK	11	(3)
2021	AC Oulu	10	(0)
2021	→ OLS	2	(2)
2021	→ KPV (loan)	11	(3)
2022–	Jaro	81	(26)

International career
2015	Finland U15	3	(0)
- * Club domestic league appearances and goals as of 20 November 2025

Severi Kähkönen (born 10 March 2000) is a Finnish professional footballer who plays as an attacking midfielder for Veikkausliiga club FF Jaro.

== Career ==
Born in Kokkola, Kähkönen played in the youth sectors of Kokkolan Palloveikot (KPV) and Jaro. He started his senior career with Jakobstads BK in third-tier Kakkonen and played also for Jaro in second-tier Ykkönen.

For the 2021 season, he joined newly promoted Veikkausliiga club AC Oulu. However, he was loaned out to KPV in August 2021.

In January 2022, he returned to Pietarsaari and signed a two-year deal with Jaro in Finnish second-tier. They were promoted to Veikkausliiga at the end of the 2024 Ykkösliiga season. On 2 May 2025, Kähkönen scored his first Veikkausliiga goal for Jaro, the winning goal in a 1–0 away win against Haka at the Tehtaan kenttä stadium.

== Career statistics ==
As of 5 May 2025

Appearances and goals by club, season and competition
Club	Season	League			National cup (Note: Includes Suomen Cup)		League cup (Note: Includes Ykköscup, Ykkösliigacup and Finnish League Cup)		Total	
Club	Season	Division	Apps	Goals	Apps	Goals	Apps	Goals	Apps	Goals
Jaro	2016	Ykkönen	0	0	1	0	–		1	0
Jaro	2017	Ykkönen	0	0	0	0	–		0	0
Jaro	2018	Ykkönen	7	0	4	0	–		11	0
Jaro	2019	Ykkönen	16	5	2	0	–		18	5
Jaro	2020	Ykkönen	21	8	5	1	–		26	9
Jaro	Total		44	13	12	1	0	0	56	14
Jakobstads BK	2017	Kakkonen	3	0	–		–		3	0
Jakobstads BK	2018	Kakkonen	3	0	1	1	–		4	1
Jakobstads BK	2019	Kakkonen	4	3	–		–		4	3
Jakobstads BK	2020	Kakkonen	1	0	–		–		1	0
Jakobstads BK	Total		11	3	1	1	0	0	12	4
AC Oulu	2021	Veikkausliiga	10	0	3	0	–		13	0
OLS (loan)	2021	Kakkonen	2	2	–		–		2	2
KPV (loan)	2021	Ykkönen	11	3	–		–		11	3
Jaro	2022	Ykkönen	23	11	3	3	3	2	29	16
Jaro	2023	Ykkönen	8	2	0	0	0	0	8	2
Jaro	2024	Ykkösliiga	27	8	2	1	6	2	35	11
Jaro	2025	Veikkausliiga	5	1	1	0	4	0	10	1
Jaro	Total		63	22	6	4	13	4	82	30
Jakobstads BK	2023	Kakkonen	1	0	–		–		1	0
Jaro U23	2023	Kolmonen	2	3	–		–		2	3
Career total			144	43	22	6	13	4	179	53

== Honours ==
Jaro

- Ykkösliiga runner-up: 2024

Individual

- Ykkönen Player of the Month: August 2020
