= Matias Paavola =

Finnish footballer (born 2000)

Personal information
- Date of birth: 30 June 2000 (age 26)
- Place of birth: Kotka, Finland
- Height: 1.86 m (6 ft 1 in)
- Position: Right back

Team information
- Current team: KTP
- Number: 26

Youth career
- –2017: KTP

Senior career*
Years	Team	Apps	(Gls)
2018–	KTP	159	(11)
2018–2021	→ Peli-Karhut (loan)	24	(3)
2019	→ Sudet (loan)	7	(1)
2023	→ PEPO (loan)	4	(0)
2023	→ Gnistan (loan)	4	(0)
- * Club domestic league appearances and goals as of 1 November 2026

Matias Paavola (born 30 June 2000) is a Finnish professional footballer who plays as a right back for Ykkösliiga club KTP.

== Career ==
Born in Kotka, Paavola started football in a local club Kotkan Työväen Palloilijat (KTP), making his senior debut with the first team in the 2018 season. During his career with the club, he has played with farm clubs Peli-Karhut and Sudet, and was loaned out to PEPO Lappeenranta and Gnistan in 2023. He has won two Finnish second-tier titles with KTP, in 2022 and 2024. Paavola was named the Ykkösliiga Player of the Month in August 2024.

== Career statistics ==
As of 10 March 2025

Appearances and goals by club, season and competition
Club	Season	League			Cup (Note: Includes Suomen Cup)		League cup (Note: Includes Finnish League Cup and Ykkösliigacup)		Europe		Total	
Club	Season	Division	Apps	Goals	Apps	Goals	Apps	Goals	Apps	Goals	Apps	Goals
KTP	2018	Ykkönen	4	0	4	0	–		–		8	0
KTP	2019	Ykkönen	17	0	5	0	–		–		22	0
KTP	2020	Ykkönen	17	1	4	0	–		–		21	1
KTP	2021	Veikkausliiga	18	0	3	0	–		–		21	0
KTP	2022	Ykkönen	24	1	2	0	–		–		26	1
KTP	2023	Veikkausliiga	4	1	2	1	5	0	–		11	2
KTP	2024	Ykkösliiga	25	5	2	1	4	0	–		31	6
KTP	2025	Veikkausliiga	0	0	0	0	5	0	–		5	0
KTP	Total		109	8	22	1	14	0	0	0	145	9
Peli-Karhut (loan)	2018	Kolmonen	19	1	–		–		–		19	1
Sudet (loan)	2019	Kakkonen	7	1	–		–		–		7	1
Peli-Karhut (loan)	2020	Kolmonen	2	0	–		–		–		2	0
Peli-Karhut (loan)	2021	Kakkonen	3	2	–		–		–		3	2
Peli-Karhut (loan)	Total		5	2	0	0	0	0	0	0	5	2
PEPO (loan)	2023	Kakkonen	4	0	–		–		–		4	0
Gnistan (loan)	2023	Ykkönen	4	0	–		–		–		4	0
Career total			147	12	22	1	14	0	0	0	183	13

== Honours ==
KTP

- Ykkösliiga: 2024
- Ykkönen: 2022
- Ykkönen runner-up: 2020

Individual

- Ykkösliiga Player of the Month: August 2024
