= Enoch Banza =

Finnish footballer (born 2000)

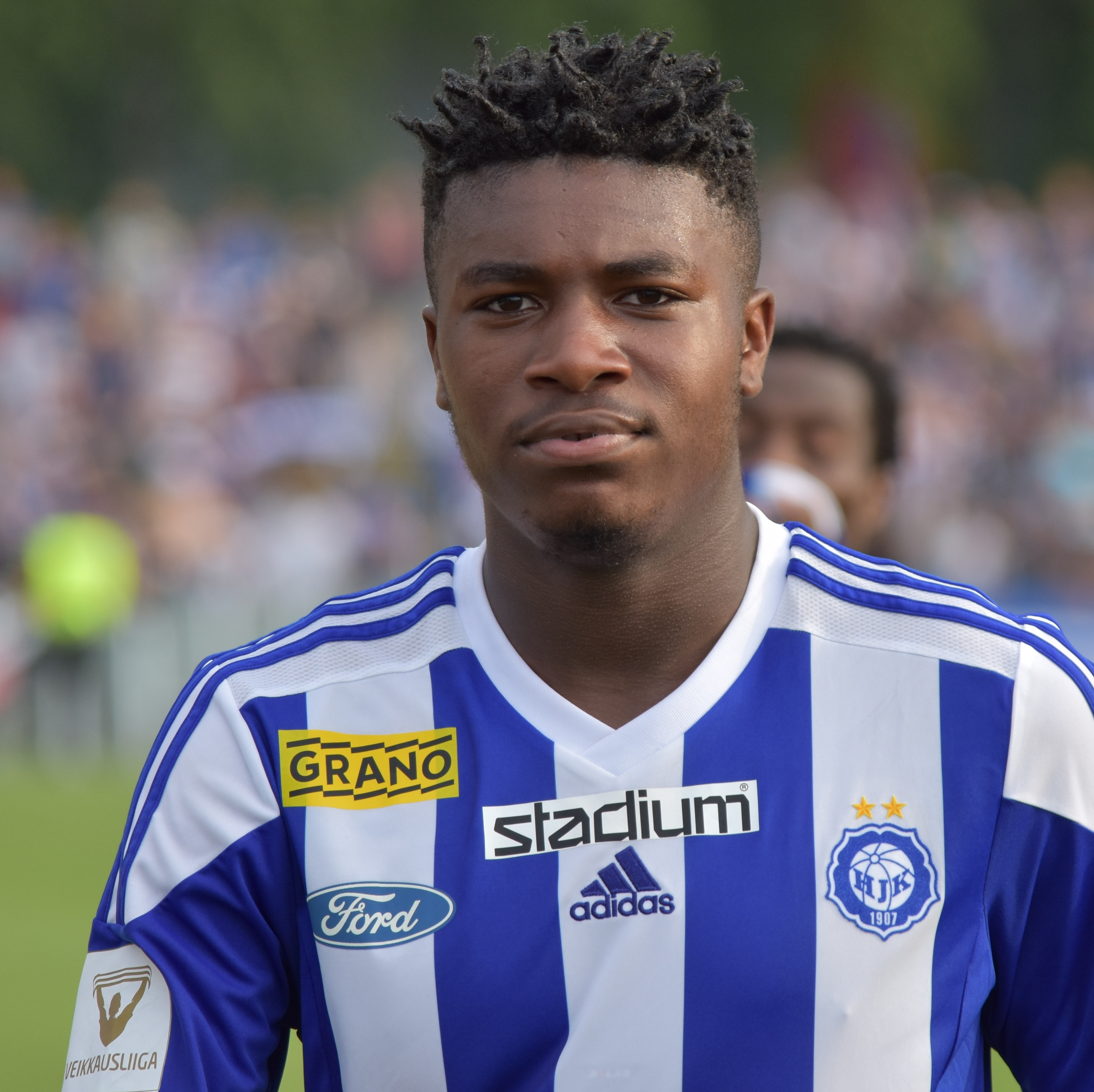
- Banza with HJK in 2018.

Personal information
- Full name: Bile-Enoch Banza
- Date of birth: 4 February 2000 (age 26)
- Place of birth: Helsinki, Finland
- Height: 1.76 m (5 ft 9 in)
- Position: Right winger

Youth career
- MPS
- HJK

Senior career*
Years	Team	Apps	(Gls)
2017–2018	Klubi 04	34	(5)
2017–2021	HJK	11	(0)
2019	→ KPV (loan)	26	(4)
2020	→ RoPS (loan)	16	(2)
2020	→ RoPS II (loan)	1	(0)
2021–2023	Raufoss IL	23	(1)
2021–2023	Raufoss IL 2	5	(0)
2022	→ AC Oulu (loan)	9	(1)
2022–2023	→ JäPS (loan)	34	(11)
2024–2025	KTP	16	(5)

International career
2018	Finland U19	4	(0)
2019–2020	Finland U21	6	(0)
- * Club domestic league appearances and goals as of 17 August 2024

Bile-Enoch Banza (born 4 February 2000) is a Finnish professional footballer who plays as right winger .

== Early life ==
Born in Helsinki, Finland, Banza is of Congolese descent. His family had fled the war in Zaire (present-day Democratic Republic of the Congo), and moved to Finland: his father in 1991 and his mother and sister in 1995. He also has four brothers who were also born in Finland. Banza received Finnish citizenship in 2018.

== Career ==
Banza started at the age of 5 at Malmin Palloseura (MPS), before he joined HJK Helsinki youth sector at the age of 8. He made his Veikkausliiga debut with HJK first team in 2017 when he was 17 years old, against PS Kemi.

On 7 January 2019, Banza was loaned out to KPV for the 2019 Veikkausliiga season. In June 2020, he was then loaned out to Veikkausliiga club RoPS for the rest of 2020 season.

In April 2021, Banza signed with Norwegian club Raufoss IL.

On 15 April 2022, Banza joined AC Oulu on loan for the 2022 season. On 26 July 2022, Banza was further loaned out to Järvenpään Palloseura (JäPS) in Finnish second tier Ykkönen. He stayed with JäPS also for the 2023 season.

On 1 March 2024, Banza joined Finnish Ykkösliiga club Kotkan Työväen Palloilijat (KTP) on a permanent contract.

== Career statistics ==
As of 22 July 2025

Appearances and goals by club, season and competition
Club	Season	League			National cup (Note: Includes Suomen Cup and Norwegian Cup)		League cup (Note: Includes Finnish League Cup, Ykköscup and Ykkösliigacup)		Continental		Total	
Club	Season	Division	Apps	Goals	Apps	Goals	Apps	Goals	Apps	Goals	Apps	Goals
Klubi 04	2017	Kakkonen	20	5	1	0	–		–		21	5
Klubi 04	2018	Kakkonen	14	0	–		–		–		14	0
Klubi 04	Total		34	5	1	0	0	0	0	0	35	5
HJK	2017	Veikkausliiga	6	0	1	0	–		0	0	6	0
HJK	2018	Veikkausliiga	5	0	3	1	–		1 (Note: Includes UEFA Champions League)	0	9	1
HJK	2019	Veikkausliiga	0	0	0	0	–		0	0	0	0
HJK	2020	Veikkausliiga	0	0	3	0	–		–		3	0
HJK	2021	Veikkausliiga	0	0	1	0	–		0	0	1	0
HJK	Total		11	0	8	1	0	0	1	0	20	1
KPV (loan)	2019	Veikkausliiga	26	4	8	4	0	0	–		34	8
RoPS (loan)	2020	Veikkausliiga	16	2	–		–		–		16	2
Raufoss IL	2021	1. divisjon	23	1	3	0	–		–		26	1
Raufoss IL 2	2021	3. divisjon	5	0	–		–		–		5	0
AC Oulu (loan)	2022	Veikkausliiga	9	1	3	1	0	0	–		12	2
JäPS (loan)	2022	Ykkönen	9	1	–		–		–		9	1
JäPS (loan)	2023	Ykkönen	25	10	1	0	6	5	–		32	15
JäPS (loan)	Total		34	11	1	0	6	5	0	0	41	16
KTP	2024	Ykkösliiga	13	5	1	0	0	0	–		14	5
KTP	2025	Veikkausliiga	3	0	3	1	0	0	–		6	1
KTP	Total		16	5	4	1	0	0	0	0	20	6
Haminan Pallo-Kissat	2025	Kakkonen	1	0	–		–		–		1	0
Career total			175	29	28	7	6	5	1	0	210	41

== Honours ==
HJK

- Veikkausliiga: 2017, 2018
- Finnish Cup: 2017, 2020

KTP

- Ykkösliiga: 2024

Individual

- Ykkösliiga Player of the Month: April 2024
