= Pyry Piirainen =

Finnish footballer (born 2000)

Personal information
- Date of birth: 14 March 2000 (age 26)
- Place of birth: Finland
- Height: 1.90 m (6 ft 3 in)
- Position: Goalkeeper

Team information
- Current team: Jippo
- Number: 1

Youth career
- –2017: KTP

Senior career*
Years	Team	Apps	(Gls)
2018–2021	KTP	4	(0)
2018–2019	→ Haminan Pallo-Kissat (loan)	12	(0)
2021	→ Peli-Karhut (loan)	5	(0)
2022–	Jippo	128	(0)
- * Club domestic league appearances and goals as of 1 November 2026

Pyry Piirainen (born 14 March 2000) is a Finnish professional footballer who plays as a goalkeeper for Ykkösliiga club Jippo.

== Club career ==
Piirainen started playing football in the youth sector of his hometown club Kotkan Työväen Palloilijat (KTP). He made his senior debut with the club's first team in the 2018 season in the second-tier Ykkönen. In 2021, he debuted with KTP in top-tier Veikkausliiga.

For the 2022 season, he joined Jippo in third-tier Kakkonen. After the 2023 season, they won a promotion to new second-tier Ykkösliiga via promotion play-offs. After the 2024 season, Piirainen was named the Ykkösliiga Goalkeeper of the Year as Jippo unexpectedly finished 3rd.

== Career statistics ==
As of 14 February 2025

Appearances and goals by club, season and competition
Club	Season	League			Cup (Note: Includes Suomen Cup)		League cup (Note: Includes Ykkösliigacup)		Total	
Club	Season	Division	Apps	Goals	Apps	Goals	Apps	Goals	Apps	Goals
KTP	2018	Ykkönen	2	0	2	0	–		4	0
KTP	2019	Ykkönen	0	0	2	0	–		2	0
KTP	2020	Ykkönen	1	0	1	0	–		2	0
KTP	2021	Veikkausliiga	1	0	1	0	–		2	0
KTP	Total		4	0	6	0	0	0	10	0
Haminan Pallo-Kissat (loan)	2018	Kolmonen	7	0	–		–		7	0
Haminan Pallo-Kissat (loan)	2019	Kolmonen	5	0	–		–		5	0
Haminan Pallo-Kissat (loan)	Total		12	0	0	0	0	0	12	0
Peli-Karhut (loan)	2021	Kakkonen	5	0	–		–		5	0
Jippo	2022	Kakkonen	25	0	3	0	–		28	0
Jippo	2023	Kakkonen	22	0	1	0	–		23	0
Jippo	2024	Ykkösliiga	27	0	1	0	4	0	32	0
Jippo	2025	Ykkösliiga	0	0	0	0	1	0	1	0
Jippo	Total		74	0	5	0	4	0	63	0
Career total			95	0	11	0	5	0	111	0

== Honours ==
Individual

- Ykkösliiga Goalkeeper of the Year: 2024
