= Anttoni Huttunen =

Finnish footballer (born 2001)

Personal information
- Date of birth: 17 December 2001 (age 24)
- Place of birth: Finland
- Height: 1.72 m (5 ft 8 in)
- Position: Attacking midfielder

Team information
- Current team: IFK Mariehamn
- Number: 16

Youth career
- Kouvolan Jalkapallo
- –2018: MyPa

Senior career*
Years	Team	Apps	(Gls)
2018–2020	MyPa	44	(5)
2021–2024	KTP	52	(9)
2021–2022	→ PeKa (loan)	12	(3)
2023	→ PEPO (loan)	4	(0)
2025–	IFK Mariehamn	45	(1)

International career
2018	Finland U18	2	(0)
- * Club domestic league appearances and goals as of 13 November 2026

Anttoni Huttunen (born 17 December 2001) is a Finnish professional footballer who plays as an attacking midfielder for Veikkausliiga club IFK Mariehamn.

== Club career ==
After playing in the youth sectors of KJP and Myllykosken Pallo -47 (MyPa), Huttunen signed a three-year deal with MyPa first team on 7 January 2019.

On 22 December 2020, Huttunen signed with newly promoted Veikkausliiga club Kotkan Työväen Palloilijat (KTP). On 27 July 2024, in an Ykkösliiga match against Käpylän Pallo (KäPa), Huttunen scored a hat-trick and helped his side to get a 5–1 away win. He was named the Ykkösliiga Player of the Month in July. At the end of the 2024 season, KTP and Huttunen won the Ykkösliiga title and earned the promotion back to Veikkausliiga. In early December, Huttunen was named the Ykkösliiga Player of the Year by the Football Association of Finland.

On 23 December 2024, Huttunen signed with IFK Mariehamn.

== Personal life ==
His father is former professional footballer Toni Huttunen, who is regarded a MYPA legend.

== Career statistics ==
As of 1 November 2026

Appearances and goals by club, season and competition
Club	Season	League			Cup (Note: Includes Suomen Cup)		League cup (Note: Includes Ykköscup, Finnish League Cup and Ykkösliigacup)		Europe		Total	
Club	Season	Division	Apps	Goals	Apps	Goals	Apps	Goals	Apps	Goals	Apps	Goals
MyPa	2018	Kakkonen	5	0	–		–		–		5	0
MyPa	2019	Ykkönen	17	2	4	1	–		–		21	3
MyPa	2020	Ykkönen	22	3	0	0	–		–		22	3
MyPa	Total		44	5	4	1	0	0	0	0	48	6
KTP	2021	Veikkausliiga	1	0	2	0	–		–		3	0
KTP	2022	Ykkönen	15	0	2	0	1	0	–		18	0
KTP	2023	Veikkausliiga	9	0	4	3	4	0	–		17	3
KTP	2024	Ykkösliiga	27	9	2	1	4	2	–		33	12
KTP	Total		52	9	10	4	9	2	0	0	71	15
Peli-Karhut (loan)	2021	Kakkonen	10	3	–		–		–		10	3
Peli-Karhut (loan)	2022	Kakkonen	2	0	–		–		–		2	0
Peli-Karhut (loan)	Total		12	3	0	0	0	0	0	0	12	3
PEPO (loan)	2023	Kakkonen	4	0	–		–		–		4	0
IFK Mariehamn	2025	Veikkausliiga	24	0	3	0	5	0	–		32	0
IFK Mariehamn	2026	Veikkausliiga	21	1	2	1	5	0	–		28	2
IFK Mariehamn	Total		45	1	5	1	10	0	–		60	2
Career total			157	18	19	6	10	0	9	2	195	26

== Honours ==
MYPA

- Kakkonen Group A: 2018

KTP

- Ykkönen: 2022
- Ykkösliiga: 2024

Individual

- Ykkösliiga Player of the Year: 2024
- Ykkösliiga Player of the Month: July 2024
