= 2020 Finnish Cup =

65th season of the Finnish Cup football competition

Tournament details
- Country: Finland
- Teams: 24

Final positions
- Champions: HJK Helsinki
- Runners-up: Inter Turku

The 2020 Finnish Cup is the 66th season of the Finnish Cup football competition.

Until the 2017–2018 season, the tournament was held in the autumn-spring schedule from July to September of the following year. The introduction of this new format of the contest meant that the League Cup was suspended.

The winner of the Finnish Cup qualifies for the 2021–22 UEFA Europa Conference League.

== Teams ==
Round	Dates	Clubs involved	Winners from previous round	New entries this round	Leagues entering this round
First round (group stage)	25 January – 29 February 2020	24	-	-	Veikkausliiga (12), Ykkönen (12).
1/8 finals	16–17 June 2020	16	12	4	
Quarter-finals	23–24 June 2020	8		–	
Semi-finals	27–28 June 2020	4		–	
Finals	3 October 2020	2		–	

== Group stage ==
The teams participating in the Group Stage were the teams of Veikkausliiga (12), Ykkönen (12). The group stage was played between January and February 2020 with teams divided into 4 divisional groups, two groups with Veikkausliiga and Ykkönen teams. The four best teams of the Veikkausliiga A and B groups, the first two teams of the Ykkönen A and B teams, and the winners of Kakkonen groups continued in the eighth finals.

=== Veikkausliiga – Group A ===
Team	Pld	W	D	L	GF	GA	GD	Pts
HJK	5	4	1	0	10	3	+7	13
Inter Turku	5	3	1	1	6	2	+4	10
Honka	5	1	3	1	4	4	0	6
TPS Turku	5	1	2	2	2	5	−3	5
HIFK	5	0	3	2	5	7	−2	3
IFK Mariehamn	5	0	2	3	5	11	−6	2

=== Veikkausliiga – Group B ===
Team	Pld	W	D	L	GF	GA	GD	Pts
FC Ilves	5	3	2	0	10	4	+6	11
KuPS	5	3	2	0	8	2	+6	11
FC Haka	5	3	2	0	7	3	+4	11
FC Lahti	5	2	0	3	6	7	−1	6
SJK	5	0	1	4	4	11	−7	1
RoPS	5	0	1	4	3	11	−8	1

=== Ykkönen – Group A ===
Team	Pld	W	D	L	GF	GA	GD	Pts
KTP	5	4	1	0	9	3	+6	13
MP	5	3	0	2	11	8	+3	9
Ekenäs IF	5	2	1	2	7	8	−1	7
Gnistan	5	1	2	2	8	8	0	5
MuSa	5	1	2	2	6	9	−3	5
MYPA	5	1	0	4	7	12	−5	3

=== Ykkönen – Group B ===
Team	Pld	W	D	L	GF	GA	GD	Pts
AC Oulu	5	3	2	0	13	6	+7	11
KPV	5	2	2	1	10	3	+7	8
VPS	5	2	1	2	7	7	0	7
AC Kajaani	5	2	1	2	5	7	−2	7
FF Jaro	5	1	1	3	7	9	−2	4
K07	5	1	1	3	3	13	−10	4

=== 1/8 finals ===
16 June 2020	KPV (2)	0–2	HJK (1)	Kokkolan Keskuskenttä, Kokkola
18:00			Väyrynen 40'; O'Shaughnessy 76'

16 June 2020	TiPS (4)	0–6	TPS (1)	Tikkurilan urheilupuisto, Tikkurila
18:00			Muzaci 27'; Tehe Olawale 45', 61', 75'; Latonen 53'; 88' (o.g.)

16 June 2020	KTP (2)	0–4	Ilves (1)	Arto Tolsa Areena, Kotka
20:00		Report	Ala-Myllymäki 16'; Tendeng 32', 75'; Veteli 46'

16 June 2020	MP (2)	1–3	Haka (1)	Mikkelin Urheilupuisto, Mikkeli
20:00	Sadik 84' (pen.)	Report	Markkanen 32'; Popovitch 59' (pen.); Ojala 90'

17 June 2020	JIPPO (3)	0–1	Inter Turku (1)	Mehtimäki tekonurmi, Joensuu
18:00		Report	Ketting 45'

17 June 2020	KaaPo (3)	0–2	KuPS (1)	Kaarinan Keskuskenttä, Kaarina
18:00		Report	Manga 39'; Udo 88'

17 June 2020	Oulu (2)	0–1	Honka (1)	Raatti Stadium, Oulu
20:00		Report	Savage 27'

17 June 2020	PeKa (4)	0–8	Lahti (1)	Arto Tolsa Areena, Kotka
20:00		Report	Virta 4'; Kuningas 9', 38'; Imbongo 33'; Hambo 45+1'; Assehnoun 64' (pen.), 90'; Zeqiri 85' (pen.)

=== Quarter-finals ===
23 June 2020	Ilves (1)	0–1	Haka (1)	Tammelan Stadion, Tampere
16:00		Report	Thusberg 12'

23 June 2020	TPS (1)	0–1	HJK (1)	Veritas Stadion, Turku
18:00		Report	O'Shaughnessy 65'

24 June 2020	Inter Turku (1)	4–4 (a.e.t.) (4–2 p)	KuPS (1)	Veritas Stadion, Turku
18:00	Hämäläinen 15'; Furuholm 73', 85'; Ruane 76' (pen.)	Report	Udo 6'; Rangel 28'; Nissilä 46'; Sale 79'
	Penalties
	Nurmi (penalty scored); Haukioja (penalty scored); Kantola (penalty scored); Ketting (penalty scored)		Purje (penalty missed); Udo (penalty scored); Manga (penalty scored); Pirttijoki (penalty missed)

24 June 2020	Honka (1)	0–1	Lahti (1)	Tapiolan Urheilupuisto, Espoo
20:00		Report	Hambo 1'

=== Semi-finals ===
27 June 2020	FC Haka (1)	2–3	HJK Helsinki (1)	Tehtaan kenttä, Valkeakoski
16:00	Kyöstilä 23'; Markkanen 78'	Report	Väyrynen 19', 32'; Ri. Riski 62'

28 June 2020	FC Inter Turku (1)	5–0	FC Lahti (1)	Veritas Stadion, Turku
16:00	Kagayama 2'; Mastokangas 53', 76'; Paananen 90+2'; Kantola 90+5'	Report

=== Final ===
3 October 2020	FC Inter Turku	0-2	HJK Helsinki	Veritas Stadion, Turku
14:00		Report	Ro. Riski 3', 54'	Referee: Petri Viljanen
