= Aleksi Tarvonen =

Finnish footballer (born 1994)

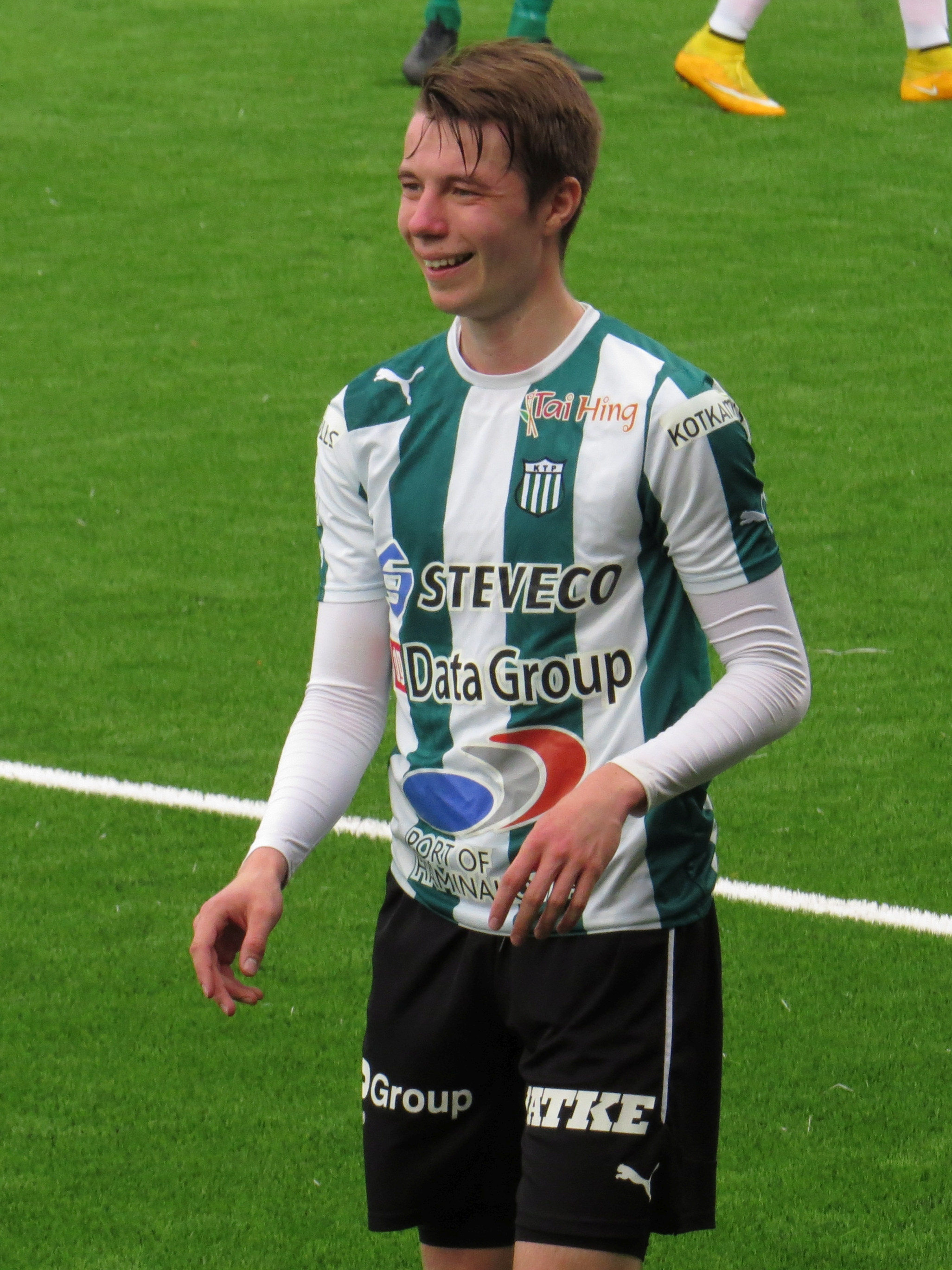
- Tarvonen with KTP in 2015

Personal information
- Date of birth: 19 July 1994 (age 32)
- Place of birth: Kotka, Finland
- Height: 1.84 m (6 ft 0 in)
- Position: Winger

Team information
- Current team: KTP
- Number: 9

Youth career
- –2011: KTP

Senior career*
Years	Team	Apps	(Gls)
2011–2018	KTP	152	(29)
2014	→ PeKa (loan)	6	(3)
2015	→ Sudet (loan)	2	(1)
2019	Ilves	6	(0)
2020	KPV	22	(10)
2021–2025	KTP	81	(29)
2023	→ PEPO (loan)	1	(0)
2023	→ JJK Jyväskylä (loan)	9	(2)
2026–	Jippo	19	(2)
- * Club domestic league appearances and goals as of 1 November 2026

Aleksi Tarvonen (born 19 July 1994) is a Finnish professional footballer who plays as a winger for Ykkösliiga club Jippo.

== Club career ==
Tarvonen started his senior career with his hometown club Kotkan Työväen Palloilijat (KTP) in Kotka. He signed with Veikkausliiga club Ilves for the 2019 season.

After a one-year stint with KPV in second-tier Ykkönen, Tarvonen returned to KTP on 21 November 2020, after the club had won a promotion to Veikkausliiga. On 11 August 2023, he was loaned out to JJK Jyväskylä for the rest of the season.

== Career statistics ==
As of 26 April 2025

Appearances and goals by club, season and competition
Club	Season	League			Cup		League cup (Note: Includes Finnish League Cup, Ykkönen Cup and Ykkösliigacup)		Total	
Club	Season	Division	Apps	Goals	Apps	Goals	Apps	Goals	Apps	Goals
KTP	2011	Kakkonen	20	1	–		–		20	1
KTP	2012	Kakkonen	27	3	1	0	–		28	3
KTP	2013	Kakkonen	23	4	0	0	–		23	4
KTP	2014	Ykkönen	0	0	0	0	–		0	0
KTP	2015	Veikkausliiga	18	0	1	0	4	0	23	0
KTP	2016	Ykkönen	24	5	1	0	–		25	5
KTP	2017	Kakkonen	16	12	4	0	–		20	12
KTP	2018	Ykkönen	24	4	3	1	–		27	5
KTP	Total		152	29	10	1	4	0	167	30
Peli-Karhut (loan)	2014	Kolmonen	7	3	–		–		7	3
Sudet (loan)	2015	Kakkonen	2	1	–		–		2	1
Ilves	2019	Veikkausliiga	6	0	2	0	–		8	0
Ilves II	2019	Kakkonen	2	0	–		–		2	0
KPV	2020	Ykkönen	22	10	5	4	–		27	14
KPV Akatemia	2020	Kolmonen	1	3	–		–		1	3
KTP	2021	Veikkausliiga	14	2	3	0	–		17	2
KTP	2022	Ykkönen	17	9	0	0	2	0	19	9
KTP	2023	Veikkausliiga	6	0	2	0	3	0	11	0
KTP	2024	Ykkösliiga	27	15	2	2	3	0	32	17
KTP	2025	Veikkausliiga	17	3	0	0	5	0	22	3
KTP	Total		81	29	7	2	13	0	101	31
PEPO (loan)	2023	Kakkonen	1	0	–		–		1	0
JJK Jyväskylä (loan)	2023	Ykkönen	9	2	–		–		9	2
Jippo	2026	Ykkösliiga	11	2	0	0	3	0	14	2
Career total			294	79	24	7	17	0	338	86

== Honours ==
KTP

- Ykkönen: 2022
- Ykkösliiga: 2024

Ilves

- Finnish Cup: 2019

Individual

- Ykkösliiga Top Scorer: 2024
- Ykkösliiga Forward of the Year: 2024
- Ykkönen Player of the Month: July 2022
- Ykkösliiga Player of the Month: June 2024
