= Luca Weckström =

Finnish footballer (born 2003)

Personal information
- Date of birth: 5 June 2003 (age 23)
- Place of birth: Helsinki, Finland
- Height: 1.81 m (5 ft 11 in)
- Position: Left winger

Team information
- Current team: Jaro

Youth career
- –2014: KäPa
- 2015: VJS
- 2016–2020: Honka

Senior career*
Years	Team	Apps	(Gls)
2021	Honka II	8	(0)
2022–2023	Gnistan	33	(4)
2023	→ NJS (loan)	1	(0)
2024–2025	KTP	43	(13)
2026–	Jaro	3	(1)
- * Club domestic league appearances and goals as of 7 May 2026

Luca Weckström (born 5 June 2003) is a Finnish professional football player who plays as a left winger for Veikkausliiga side Jaro.

== Club career ==
In February 2022, Weckström signed with IF Gnistan in second-tier Ykkönen.

In late November 2023, he joined KTP. They won the 2024 Ykkösliiga and were promoted to Veikkausliiga for the 2025 season.

After KTP was relegated, Weckström joined FF Jaro for the 2026 season. He was injured in early May after three league matches and was estimated to miss the entire campaign.

== Personal life ==
Weckström belongs to a football family. His grandfather Juha, mother Nina, uncle John and aunt Anne-Maria are former players. His cousins Daniel Rantanen and Amanda Rantanen have also played football professionally.

== Career statistics ==
As of 7 May 2026

Appearances and goals by club, season and competition
Club	Season	League			National cup (Note: Includes Suomen Cup)		League cup (Note: Includes Ykköscup, Ykkösliigacup and Finnish League Cup)		Total	
Club	Season	Division	Apps	Goals	Apps	Goals	Apps	Goals	Apps	Goals
Honka Akatemia	2021	Kakkonen	8	0	–		–		8	0
Gnistan	2022	Ykkönen	11	2	1	0	3	2	15	4
Gnistan	2023	Ykkönen	22	2	3	1	1	0	26	3
Gnistan	Total		33	4	4	1	4	2	41	7
Gnistan/Ogeli	2022	Nelonen	1	0	–		–		1	0
Gnistan/Ogeli	2023	Kolmonen	1	0	–		–		1	0
Gnistan/Ogeli	Total		2	0	0	0	0	0	2	0
NJS (loan)	2023	Kakkonen	1	0	–		–		1	0
KTP	2024	Ykkösliiga	27	11	2	1	4	3	33	15
KTP	2025	Veikkausliiga	16	2	2	0	4	1	22	3
KTP	Total		43	13	4	1	8	4	55	18
Jaro	2026	Veikkausliiga	3	1	1	2	3	0	7	3
Career total			90	18	9	4	15	6	114	28

== Honours ==
KTP

- Ykkösliiga: 2024

Gnistan

- Ykkönen runner-up: 2023
