= Constantine Edlund =

American soccer player (born 2004)

Personal information
- Date of birth: 20 June 2004 (age 22)
- Place of birth: United States
- Height: 1.82 m (6 ft 0 in)
- Position: Midfielder

Team information
- Current team: Athens Kallithea
- Number: 12

Youth career
- Chicago Fire

Senior career*
Years	Team	Apps	(Gls)
2022–	Athens Kallithea	0	(0)
2024–2025	→ KTP (loan)	33	(1)
- * Club domestic league appearances and goals as of 19 November 2025

Constantine Edlund (Greek: Κωνσταντίνος Έντλουντ; born 20 June 2004) is an American professional soccer player who plays as a midfielder for Super League Greece 2 side Athens Kallithea.

== Club career ==
Edlund was loaned out from Greek club Athens Kallithea to Finnish club KTP Kotka for the 2024 season. During his loan spell with KTP, they won the second-tier Ykkösliiga title in 2024, were promoted, and Edlund's loan deal was extended. He made a debut in the Finnish first-tier Veikkausliiga on 5 April 2025, in the season opening match against SJK Seinäjoki.

== Career statistics ==
As of 29 April 2025

Appearances and goals by club, season and competition
Club	Season	League			National cup (Note: Includes Greek Cup and Suomen Cup)		League cup (Note: Includes Ykkösliigacup and Finnish League Cup)		Total	
Club	Season	Division	Apps	Goals	Apps	Goals	Apps	Goals	Apps	Goals
Athens Kallithea	2023–24	Super League Greece 2	0	0	0	0	–		0	0
KTP (loan)	2024	Ykkösliiga	15	1	3	1	2	0	20	2
KTP (loan)	2025	Veikkausliiga	4	0	1	0	4	0	9	0
KTP (loan)	Total		19	1	4	1	6	0	29	2
Peli-Karhut (loan)	2024	Kolmonen	5	0	–		–		5	0
Career total			24	1	4	1	6	0	34	2

== Honors ==
KTP

- Ykkösliiga: 2024
