= Yoshiaki Kikuchi =

Japanese footballer

Personal information
- Date of birth: 22 July 1995 (age 31)
- Place of birth: Miyazaki, Japan
- Height: 1.63 m (5 ft 4 in)
- Position: Midfielder

Team information
- Current team: Jippo
- Number: 41

Youth career
- –2013: Nissho Gakuen HS
- 2014–2017: Ryutsu Keizai University

Senior career*
Years	Team	Apps	(Gls)
2014–2015	RKD Ryugasaki	1	(0)
2018–2019	Hennef 05	25	(4)
2019–2021	Leixões	1	(0)
2020	→ Bragança (loan)	6	(3)
2020	→ Estrela (loan)	1	(0)
2021	→ Castro Daire (loan)	6	(1)
2022	IF Gnistan	27	(4)
2023–	Jippo	99	(29)
- * Club domestic league appearances and goals as of 1 November 2026

Yoshiaki Kikuchi (菊池 禎晃, Kikuchi Yoshiaki; born 22 July 1995) is a Japanese professional footballer who plays as a midfielder for Finnish club Jippo in Ykkösliiga.

== Career ==
On 30 March 2023, Kikuchi joined Jippo in the Finnish third-tier Kakkonen.

He was Ykkösliiga Player of the Month in May 2024.

== Career statistics ==
As of 26 October 2024

Appearances and goals by club, season and competition
Club	Season	League			National cup		League cup		Other		Total	
Club	Season	Division	Apps	Goals	Apps	Goals	Apps	Goals	Apps	Goals	Apps	Goals
RKD Ryugasaki	2015	Japan Football League	1	0	0	0	–		0	0	1	0
Hennef 05	2018–19	Mittelrheinliga	25	4	0	0	2	3	4	1	31	8
Leixões	2019–20	LigaPro	1	0	0	0	0	0	0	0	1	0
Bragança (loan)	2019–20	Campeonato de Portugal	6	3	0	0	–		0	0	6	3
Estrela (loan)	2020–21	Campeonato de Portugal	1	0	0	0	–		0	0	1	0
Castro Daire (loan)	2020–21	Campeonato de Portugal	6	1	–		–		–		6	1
Gnistan	2022	Ykkönen	27	4	1	0	–		–		28	4
JIPPO	2023	Kakkonen	25	9	1	0	–		–		26	9
JIPPO	2024	Ykkösliiga	27	11	1	0	–		4	2	32	13
JIPPO	Total		52	20	2	0	0	0	4	2	58	22
Career total			119	32	3	0	2	3	4	2	128	37
