= Salomo Ojala =

Finnish footballer (born 1997)

Personal information
- Date of birth: 17 April 1997 (age 29)
- Place of birth: Tampere, Finland
- Height: 1.87 m (6 ft 2 in)
- Position: Centre forward

Team information
- Current team: Landskrona BoIS
- Number: 7

Youth career
- TKT Tampere

Senior career*
Years	Team	Apps	(Gls)
2015	Ilves-Kissat	22	(3)
2016–2017	TPV	23	(8)
2016–2017	TPV II	24	(27)
2018–2022	Haka	95	(35)
2020	→ AC Kajaani (loan)	1	(0)
2023–2024	EIF	42	(11)
2025	Mosta	5	(0)
2025–2026	EIF	26	(19)
2026–	Landskrona BoIS	4	(0)
- * Club domestic league appearances and goals as of 11 November 2026

Salomo Ojala (born 17 April 1997) is a Finnish professional footballer who plays as a centre forward for Superettan club Landskrona BoIS.

== Club career ==
Ojala started football in the youth sector of TKT Tampere.

He played for Ilves-Kissat and Tampereen Pallo-Veikot in the third tier Kakkonen, before joining FC Haka in the second-tier Ykkönen in 2018. In the 2019 season, Ojala scored 23 goals, making him the Ykkönen top scorer. He helped Haka to overwhelmingly win the Ykkönen title and earn the promotion to top-tier Veikkausliiga. Ojala was also named the Ykkönen Player of the Year.

Ojala signed for Ekenäs IF for the 2023 Ykkönen season, and helped EIF to win the Ykkönen title. Next 2024 Veikkausliiga season, Ojala scored seven goals for EIF in the league.

On 24 January 2025, Ojala signed with Maltese Premier League club Mosta.

On 20 March 2025, he returned to EIF for the 2025 Ykkösliiga season.

== Personal life ==
Ojala was born in Tampere and was raised in Hervanta neighbourhood. His older sister Rosanna is a gymnast. Ojala is a religious person.

== Career statistics ==
As of 19 May 2025

Appearances and goals by club, season and competition
Club	Season	League			Cup (Note: Includes Suomen Cup and Maltese FA Trophy)		League cup (Note: Includes Finnish League Cup and Ykköscup)		Total	
Club	Season	Division	Apps	Goals	Apps	Goals	Apps	Goals	Apps	Goals
Ilves-Kissat	2015	Kakkonen	22	3	–		–		22	3
TPV	2016	Kakkonen	13	3	2	0	–		15	3
TPV	2017	Kakkonen	10	5	1	0	–		11	5
TPV	Total		23	8	3	0	0	0	26	8
TPV II	2016	Nelonen	13	19	–		–		13	19
TPV II	2017	Kolmonen	11	8	–		–		11	8
TPV II	Total		24	27	0	0	0	0	24	27
Haka	2018	Ykkönen	18	4	6	4	–		24	8
Haka	2019	Ykkönen	26	23	4	0	–		30	23
Haka	2020	Veikkausliiga	21	6	4	1	–		25	7
Haka	2021	Veikkausliiga	16	1	2	0	–		18	1
Haka	2022	Veikkausliiga	14	1	2	0	5	0	21	1
Haka	Total		95	35	18	5	5	0	118	40
AC Kajaani (loan)	2020	Ykkönen	1	0	–		–		1	0
Ekenäs IF	2023	Ykkönen	16	4	3	3	2	1	21	8
Ekenäs IF	2024	Veikkausliiga	26	7	5	3	4	1	35	11
Ekenäs IF	Total		42	11	8	6	6	2	56	19
Mosta	2024–25	Maltese Premier League	5	0	2	1	–		7	1
Ekenäs IF	2025	Ykkösliiga	5	2	2	1	–		7	3
Career total			217	96	33	13	11	2	261	111

== Honours ==
Haka

- Ykkönen: 2019

Ekenäs IF

- Ykkönen: 2023

Individual

- Ykkönen Player of the Year 2019
- Ykkönen top scorer: 2019
