= Albijon Muzaci =

Finnish footballer (born 1996)

Personal information
- Date of birth: 11 June 1996 (age 30)
- Place of birth: Mitrovica, Kosovo, FR Yugoslavia
- Height: 1.84 m (6 ft 0 in)
- Position: Right winger

Team information
- Current team: TPS
- Number: 29

Youth career
- –2011: KaaPo
- 2012–2014: SalPa

Senior career*
Years	Team	Apps	(Gls)
2014–2015	SalPa	50	(14)
2016	Jazz	9	(0)
2016	→ Porin Pallo-Toverit	1	(0)
2016	→ SalPa (loan)	8	(1)
2017–2018	SalPa	39	(12)
2019–2022	TPS	101	(19)
2023	SalPa	23	(7)
2024–	TPS	66	(32)
- * Club domestic league appearances and goals as of 13 November 2026

Albijon Muzaci (born 11 June 1996) is a Finnish professional footballer who plays as a right winger for Veikkausliiga club TPS.

== Club career ==
Muzaci debuted in Veikkausliiga with Turun Palloseura (TPS) first team in the 2020 season. He scored his first league goal on 29 August 2020 against Kuopion Palloseura (KuPS).

== Personal life ==
Born in Kosovo and raised in Finland, Muzaci is of Kosovo Albanian descent. Besides professional football, Muzaci has played futsal for KF Kosova and FC Bosna Turku.

== Career statistics ==
As of 13 November 2026

Club	Season	League			Finnish Cup		Other		Total	
Club	Season	Division	Apps	Goals	Apps	Goals	Apps	Goals	Apps	Goals
SalPa	2014	Kakkonen	25	7	1	0	—		26	7
SalPa	2015	Kakkonen	25	7	—		—		25	7
SalPa	Total		50	14	—		—		50	14
Jazz	2016	Ykkönen	9	0	4	0	—		13	0
Jazz B	2016	Kakkonen	1	0	—		—		1	0
SalPa (loan)	2016	Kakkonen	8	1	—		—		8	1
SalPa	2017	Kakkonen	18	4	—		—		18	4
SalPa	2018	Kakkonen	20	8	—		—		20	8
SalPa	Total		38	12	—		—		38	12
TPS	2019	Ykkönen	22	7	3	0	2 (Note: Appearance(s) in Promotion/Relegation play-off)	0	27	7
TPS	2020	Veikkausliiga	19	1	5	1	2	1	26	3
TPS	2021	Ykkönen	27	6	3	0	—		30	6
TPS	2022	Ykkönen	27	4	1	1	2	0	30	5
TPS	Total		95	18	12	2	6	1	113	21
SalPa	2023	Ykkönen	23	7	3	2	—		26	9
TPS	2024	Ykkösliiga	17	10	3	0	3 (Note: Includes Ykkösliigacup)	0	23	10
TPS	2025	Ykkösliiga	25	13	2	2	4 (Note: Two appearances in Ykkösliigacup and two Appearances in Playoff)	2	31	17
TPS	2026	Veikkausliiga	24	9	2	0	—		26	9
TPS	Total		66	32	7	2	7	2	80	36
Career Total			290	84	27	6	13	3	330	93
