= Daniel Rantanen =

Finnish footballer (born 1998)

Personal information
- Date of birth: 11 May 1998 (age 28)
- Place of birth: Helsinki, Finland
- Height: 1.82 m (6 ft 0 in)
- Position: Midfielder

Youth career
- 2001–2002: PK-35
- 2003–2005: PuiU
- 2006–2010: HJK
- 2011–2015: PK-35 Vantaa

Senior career*
Years	Team	Apps	(Gls)
2015	PK-35 Vantaa	18	(3)
2016–2018	HIFK	4	(0)
2016	→ Gnistan (loan)	6	(0)
2016	→ PK-35 Vantaa (loan)	7	(0)
2019	Ekenäs IF	23	(6)
2020	AC Oulu	16	(1)
2021	PK-35	25	(5)
2022–2023	TPS	52	(8)
2024	PK-35	18	(1)
2025–	Gilla FC	0	(0)

International career
2014	Finland U16	3	(0)
2015	Finland U17	4	(0)
2016	Finland U18	6	(1)
- * Club domestic league appearances and goals as of 26 October 2024

Daniel Rantanen (born 11 May 1998) is a Finnish former professional footballer who last played for Ykkösliiga club PK-35 as a midfielder.

In 2025, he joined a team Gilla FC with influencers and other ex-pros.

== Career ==
=== Early years ===
Rantanen started playing football at the age of three at PK-35. He then moved to Puistolan Urheilijat, where he played for three years and then . However, 13-year old Rantanen then returned to PK-35 Vantaa.

=== Club career ===
Rantanen his senior career in 2015, when he was promoted to PK-35 Vantaa's first team and made his debut the day before his 17th birthday in the Ykkönen. In the 2015 season, Rantanen played a total of 18 Ykkönen matches and scored three goals, helping the team with promotion to the Veikkausliiga for the 2016 season.

He then moved to HIFK, which played in the Veikkausliiga for the 2016 season. Rantanen made his debut in Veikkausliiga on April 25, 2016, in against PS Kemi. In the summer 2016, he went on trials at Premier League clubs, Crystal Palace and later Stoke City. Rantanen scored two goals in a friendly game for Stoke and the club showed interest in him. However, he had recently signed with HIFK, which made such an operation difficult.

In the 2016 season, Rantanen only played four league matches in HIFK and then went on loan to IF Gnistan and later to his former club PK-35 Vantaa. In the 2017 season, Rantanen only played for HIFK's reserve team and U19s.

Rantanen joined Ekenäs IF, which played in Ykkönen for the 2019 season. He played a total of 23 Ykkönen matches in the 2019 season and scored six goals in them. On 10 December 2019 it was confirmed, that Rantanen had signed a one-year deal with AC Oulu.

On 9 December 2021, he agreed to join TPS for the 2022 season.

== Personal life ==
Daniel comes from a football family. His twin sister, Amanda Rantanen, is also a footballer. His mother, Anne Maria Weckström-Rantanen, has also played football and since worked as a football coach, and his father, Rami Rantanen, is a former Finnish national player. His cousin Luca Weckström is also a professional footballer.
