= Tabi Manga =

Cameroonian footballer

Personal information
- Full name: Luc Landry Tabi Manga
- Date of birth: 17 November 1994 (age 31)
- Place of birth: Yaoundé, Cameroon
- Height: 1.86 m (6 ft 1 in)
- Position: Defender

Team information
- Current team: Ekenäs IF
- Number: 4

Senior career*
Years	Team	Apps	(Gls)
2014–2015	APEJES Academy		
2016–2017	Levadia	51	(6)
2017	→ Levadia II	5	(1)
2018–2020	KuPS	42	(4)
2018	→ KuFu-98	2	(0)
2021–2022	Ilves	27	(1)
2023	Ekenäs IF	25	(2)
2024–2025	KTP	37	(3)
2025–	Ekenäs IF	5	(0)
- * Club domestic league appearances and goals as of 23 November 2025

Luc Landry Tabi Manga (born 17 November 1994) is a Cameroonian professional footballer who plays as a defender for Finnish club Ekenäs IF.

== Honours ==
KTP

- Ykkösliiga: 2024

EIF

- Ykkönen: 2023

KuPS

- Veikkausliiga: 2019

Levadia

- Meistriliiga runner-up: 2016, 2017

Individual

- Ykkösliiga Defender of the Year: 2024
