= Jonas Nyholm =

Finnish football coach (born 1992)

Personal information
- Date of birth: 23 June 1992 (age 34)
- Place of birth: Eurajoki, Finland
- Height: 1.76 m (5 ft 9 in)
- Position: Defensive midfielder

Team information
- Current team: KuPS (assistant)

Youth career
- Pallo-Iirot

Senior career*
Years	Team	Apps	(Gls)
2011–2013	Pallo-Iirot	56	(5)
2014	Jazz	19	(0)
2015	Pallo-Iirot	26	(2)
2016	Gnistan	21	(0)
2019	SAPA	5	(0)

Managerial career
- 2022–2023: KTP (assistant)
- 2024–2025: KTP
- 2026–: KuPS (assistant)
- * Club domestic league appearances and goals as of 15 March 2024

Jonas Nyholm (born 23 June 1992) is a Finnish football coach and a former player, who played as a defensive midfielder. He is currently working as assistant coach of Veikkausliiga club Kuopion Palloseura.

== Playing career ==
Born in Rauma, Nyholm started football in a youth team of a local club Pallo-Iirot, and made his senior debut with the club's first team in 2011. He played also for Jazz and Gnistan in the second and the third-tiers of Finnish football league system.

== Coaching career ==
In 2016, after moving to Helsinki to play for Gnistan, Nyholm started coaching in a youth sector of HJK Helsinki.

For the 2022 season, he moved to Kotka to join the coaching staff of Jussi Leppälahti in Kotkan Työväen Palloilijat (KTP) as an assistant coach, and additionally for the youth sector. The KTP first team won the second-tier Ykkönen title and were promoted to top-tier Veikkausliiga for the 2023. One year later, after a difficult season, KTP were relegated and Nyholm was appointed the head coach for the 2024 Ykkösliiga season. He led the team to win the new second-tier Ykkösliiga title, and earn a promotion back to Veikkausliiga for the 2025.

== Managerial statistics ==
As of 27 October 2024

Team	Nat	From	To	Record				
Team	Nat	From	To	G	W	D	L	Win %
KTP	(Finland)	1 January 2024	present	34	21	6	7	61.76
Total				34	21	6	7	61.76

== Managerial honours ==
KTP

- Ykkösliiga: 2024
