= Edvin Crona =

Swedish footballer (born 2000)

Personal information
- Full name: Edvin Mulle Vilhelm Crona
- Date of birth: 25 January 2000 (age 26)
- Place of birth: Sweden
- Position: Forward

Team information
- Current team: IFK Berga

Youth career
- Ljungbyholms GoIF
- Kalmar FF

Senior career*
Years	Team	Apps	(Gls)
2017–2023	Kalmar FF	30	(2)
2019	→ Oskarshamns AIK (loan)	0	(0)
2019	→ IFK Värnamo (loan)	7	(3)
2021	→ Oskarshamns AIK (loan)	17	(4)
2022	→ Åtvidaberg (loan)	23	(3)
2023	→ Oskarshamns AIK (loan)	28	(9)
2024	Jaro	22	(8)
2025–	IFK Berga	0	(0)

International career^{‡}
2015–2017	Sweden U17	16	(7)
2017	Sweden U19	2	(1)
2020	Sweden U21	1	(0)
- * Club domestic league appearances and goals as of 27 October 2024 ‡ National team caps and goals as of 14 September 2020

Edvin Mulle Vilhelm Crona (born 25 January 2000) is a Swedish footballer who plays as a forward for IFK Berga.

== Club career ==
On 29 March 2022, Crona joined Åtvidaberg on loan.

On 5 February 2024, Crona moved to Finland after signing with FF Jaro in new second-tier Ykkösliiga.

== Career statistics ==
As of 27 October 2024

Appearances and goals by club, season and competition
Club	Season	League			Cup (Note: Includes Svenska Cupen and Suomen Cup)		Other		Total	
Club	Season	Division	Apps	Goals	Apps	Goals	Apps	Goals	Apps	Goals
Kalmar FF	2017	Allsvenskan	5	0	0	0	–		5	0
Kalmar FF	2018	Allsvenskan	0	0	0	0	–		0	0
Kalmar FF	2019	Allsvenskan	1	0	3	0	–		4	0
Kalmar FF	2020	Allsvenskan	24	2	4	1	–		28	3
Kalmar FF	2021	Allsvenskan	0	0	2	0	–		2	0
Kalmar FF	Total		30	2	9	1	5	0	39	3
IFK Värnamo (loan)	2019	Ettan Södra	7	3	–		–		7	3
Oskarshamns AIK (loan)	2021	Ettan Södra	17	4	–		–		17	4
Åtvidaberg (loan)	2022	Ettan Södra	22	3	–		–		22	3
Oskarshamns AIK (loan)	2023	Ettan Södra	28	9	4	1	–		32	10
Jaro	2024	Ykkösliiga	22	8	1	0	4 (Note: Includes Ykkösliigacup)	5	27	13
Career total			126	29	14	2	4	5	144	36

== Honours ==
Jaro

- Ykkösliiga runner-up: 2024
