= Harrison De Nicolo =

Australian soccer player

Personal information
- Date of birth: 25 June 1999 (age 27)
- Place of birth: Australia
- Position: Forward

Youth career
- Heidelberg United
- Kalamata
- 2018–2019: Levadiakos

Senior career*
| Years | Team | Apps | (Gls) |
| 2017–2018 | Kalamata | 5 | (0) |
| 2019–2021 | Kerkyra | 6 | (0) |
| 2021–2022 | Nordvärmlands FF | 14 | (4) |
| 2022 | FC Vaajakoski | 21 | (3) |
| 2023 | Gottne IF | | |
| 2023 | Säffle SK | | |
- * Club domestic league appearances and goals

Harrison De Nicolo (born 25 June 1999) is an Australian professional soccer player who plays as a forward.

== Club career ==
On 1 April 2022, De Nicolo signed with FC Vaajakoski in the Finnish third-tier Kakkonen.
