= Keir Foster =

Scottish footballer (born 2004)

Personal information
- Date of birth: 18 October 2004 (age 22)
- Place of birth: Edinburgh, Scotland
- Position: Winger

Team information
- Current team: East Kilbride
- Number: 12

Youth career
- Hibernian
- –2022: The Spartans

Senior career*
Years	Team	Apps	(Gls)
2022–2024	Queen of the South	0	(0)
2022–2023	→ Edinburgh University (loan)	6	(0)
2023–2024	→ Bo'ness United (loan)	11	(4)
2024	SalPa	24	(3)
2025	Bo'ness United	11	(4)
2025–	East Kilbride	24	(3)
- * Club domestic league appearances and goals as of 4 May 2026

Keir Foster (born 18 October 2004) is a Scottish professional footballer who plays as a winger for Scottish League Two club East Kilbride.

== Youth career ==
Foster played in the youth sectors of Hibernian and The Spartans in Edinburgh.

== Club career ==
For the 2022–23 season, he joined Scottish League One club Queen of the South, but didn't make any appearance for the club as he spent the next two seasons on loan playing in Lowland League, first with Edinburgh University and then with Bo'ness United.

In January 2024, Foster attended an exhibition game and training session in London with about 25 players, arranged by Finnish club SalPa. The club's aim was to look for young British talent to strengthen their team, and to offer a professional contract to one. Eventually, Foster was invited to Finland and offered a one-year professional contract with a one-year option. SalPa documented the sessions and later published a mini-documentary series, Unelma elää (eng. The Dream is Alive), about the recruiting process.

On 28 April 2024, in his fourth Ykkösliiga match with SalPa, Foster scored a hat-trick in a 5–0 home win over MP.

== Career statistics ==
As of 5 May 2025

Appearances and goals by club, season and competition
Club	Season	League			National cup (Note: Includes Scottish Cup and Suomen Cup)		League cup (Note: Includes Scottish League Cup and Ykkösliigacup)		Total	
Club	Season	Division	Apps	Goals	Apps	Goals	Apps	Goals	Apps	Goals
Queen of the South	2022–23	Scottish League One	0	0	0	0	0	0	0	0
Queen of the South	2023–24	Scottish League One	0	0	0	0	0	0	0	0
Queen of the South	Total		0	0	0	0	0	0	0	0
Edinburgh University (loan)	2022–23	Lowland League	6	0	1	1	–		7	1
Bo'ness United (loan)	2023–24	Lowland League	11	4	1	0	–		12	4
SalPa	2024	Ykkösliiga	24	3	2	1	4	1	30	5
Bo'ness United	2024–25	Lowland League	11	4	–		–		11	4
East Kilbride	2025–26	Scottish League Two	0	0	0	0	0	0	0	0
Career total			52	11	4	2	4	1	60	14
