= Jordi Aluja =

Spanish football manager (born 1995)

Personal information
- Full name: Jordi Aluja Berengué
- Date of birth: 12 November 1995 (age 30)
- Place of birth: Cambrils, Tarragona, Spain

Team information
- Current team: St Johnstone (assistant coach)

Managerial career
- Years: Team
- 2016–2017: CF Amposta (assistant)
- 2018–2019: Angkor Tiger (assistant)
- 2020–2021: KTP (assistant)
- 2022–2023: KäPa
- 2024: SalPa
- 2025: OLS (assistant)
- 2025–: St Johnstone (assistant)

Jordi Aluja Berengué (born 12 November 1995) is a Spanish coach, currently working as assistant coach of St Johnstone.

== Coaching career ==
Aluja started his professional coaching career in his native Spain with CF Amposta in 2016. During the 2018–19 season, Aluja worked as an assistant coach for Angkor Tiger in Cambodian Premier League.

In January 2020, Aluja moved to Finland and signed a contract with Kotkan Työväen Palloilijat (KTP).

He was named the head coach of Käpylän Pallo for the 2022 season in Finnish second tier. In November, his contract was extended.

In October 2023, he was appointed the head coach of SalPa. He left SalPa after the 2024 Ykkösliiga season due to the club's financial difficulties and ownership changes.

On 31 January 2025, Aluja started coaching in OLS, the reserve team of Veikkausliiga club AC Oulu.

In June 2025 he was appointed assistant coach for St Johnstone.
