= Toni Huttunen =

Finnish footballer (born 1973)

Personal information
- Date of birth: 12 January 1973 (age 53)
- Place of birth: Kuusankoski, Finland
- Height: 1.73 m (5 ft 8 in)
- Position: Defender

Senior career*
Years	Team	Apps	(Gls)
1991	Kuusankosken Kumu	11	(4)
1992–2009	MyPa	441	(23)
1997	→ Falkirk (loan)	2	(0)
Total		454	(27)

International career
1994–2002	Finland	11	(0)
- * Club domestic league appearances and goals

Toni Huttunen (born 12 January 1973) is a Finnish retired footballer who played almost his entire career for MyPa.

He earned 11 caps for the Finnish national side between 1994 and 2002. Huttunen has made a total of 441 appearances in Veikkausliiga with MyPa, making him the most capped player in the Finnish top-tier.

== Personal life ==
His son Anttoni Huttunen is also a professional footballer.

== Career statistics ==
As of 20 May 2024.

Appearances and goals by club, season and competition
Club	Season	League			National cup (Note: Includes Suomen Cup)		League Cup (Note: Includes Finnish League Cup)		Continental		Total	
Club	Season	Division	Apps	Goals	Apps	Goals	Apps	Goals	Apps	Goals	Apps	Goals
Kuusankosken Kumu	1991	Ykkönen	11	4	–		–		–		11	4
MYPA	1992	Veikkausliiga	14	1	–		–		–		14	1
MYPA	1993	Veikkausliiga	27	1	–		–		2 (Note: Includes UEFA Cup Winners' Cup)	0	29	1
MYPA	1994	Veikkausliiga	21	1	–		–		4 (Note: Includes UEFA Cup)	0	25	1
MYPA	1995	Veikkausliiga	26	2	–		–		4	0	30	2
MYPA	1996	Veikkausliiga	26	2	–		–		4	0	30	2
MYPA	1997	Veikkausliiga	24	1	–		–		2	0	26	1
MYPA	1998	Veikkausliiga	26	2	–		–		–		26	2
MYPA	1999	Veikkausliiga	28	1	–		–		–		28	1
MYPA	2000	Veikkausliiga	30	3	–		–		2 (Note: Includes UEFA Intertoto Cup)	0	32	3
MYPA	2001	Veikkausliiga	28	1	–		–		2	0	30	1
MYPA	2002	Veikkausliiga	25	1	–		–		2	0	27	1
MYPA	2003	Veikkausliiga	24	3	–		–		4	0	28	3
MYPA	2004	Veikkausliiga	25	1	1	0	–		2	0	28	1
MYPA	2005	Veikkausliiga	24	0	–		–		6	0	30	0
MYPA	2006	Veikkausliiga	16	0	–		–		3 (Note: Includes UEFA Champions League)	0	19	0
MYPA	2007	Veikkausliiga	25	1	–		–		4	0	29	1
MYPA	2008	Veikkausliiga	26	0	–		–		–		26	0
MYPA	2009	Veikkausliiga	26	2	–		6	0	–		32	2
MYPA	Total		441	23	1	0	6	0	41	0	489	23
Falkirk (loan)	1996–97	Scottish First Division	2	0	–		–		–		2	0
Career total			454	23	1	0	6	0	41	0	502	23

=== International ===
As of match played 7 January 2002

Appearances and goals by national team and year
National team	Year	Apps	Goals
Finland	1994	2	0
Finland	1995	0	0
Finland	1996	1	0
Finland	1997	1	0
Finland	1998	0	0
Finland	1999	0	0
Finland	2000	2	0
Finland	2001	4	0
Finland	2002	1	0
Total		11	0

== Honours ==
MYPA

- Veikkausliiga: 2005
- Veikkausliiga runner-up: 1993, 1994, 1995, 1996, 2002
- Finnish Cup: 1992, 1995, 2004
