= 2024 Ykkösliiga =

Ykkösliiga
- Season: 2024
- Champions: KTP
- Promoted: Jaro; KTP
- Relegated: MP
- Matches: 135
- Goals: 420 (3.11 per match)
- Top goalscorer: Aleksi Tarvonen (15 goals)

The 2024 Ykkösliiga was the inaugural season of Ykkösliiga, the new second highest football league in Finland. The season began on 13 April 2024 and ended on 19 October 2024.

== Teams ==

=== Team changes ===
The league was contested with 10 clubs, unlike former second-tier Ykkönen which included 12 clubs.

Promoted to 2024 Veikkausliiga	Relegated to 2024 Ykkönen	Promoted from 2023 Kakkonen	Relegated from 2023 Veikkausliiga	Promoted to 2025 Veikkausliiga	Relegated to 2025 Ykkönen
Ekenäs IF; Gnistan	JJK Jyväskylä; KPV	JIPPO; PK-35	KTP	KTP; Jaro	MP

- PK-35 qualified for the 2024 Ykkösliiga promotion play-offs as a 2023 Kakkonen Group A runner-up, and were promoted to Ykkösliiga as a play-offs winner.
- FC Honka were declared for bankruptcy after the 2023 Veikkausliiga season. Via supplemental process, 2023 Ykkönen runner-up Gnistan were promoted to 2024 Veikkausliiga, and 2024 Ykkösliiga promotion play-offs runner-up JIPPO were promoted to 2024 Ykkösliiga.
- HIFK were declared for bankruptcy after the 2023 Ykkönen season, and Käpylän Pallo (KäPa) earned a spot in 2024 Ykkösliiga via supplemental process, by which KäPa avoided the relegation after finishing 10th of 12 teams in 2023 Ykkönen.

=== Participants ===
Club	Location	Stadium	Capacity	Manager
FF Jaro	Jakobstad (Pietarsaari)	Jakobstads Centralplan	5,000	(Finland) Niklas Vidjeskog
JIPPO	Joensuu	Mehtimäki	1,000	(Finland) Mikko Hallikainen
JäPS	Järvenpää	Järvenpään keskuskenttä	2,000	(Finland) Teemu Kankkunen
KTP	Kotka	Arto Tolsa Areena	4,780	(Finland) Jonas Nyholm
KäPa	Helsinki	Brahenkenttä	1,200	(Finland) Lari Lummepuro
MP	Mikkeli	Mikkelin Urheilupuisto	7,000	(Finland) Juha Pasoja
PK-35	Helsinki	Algeco Areena	1,200	(Portugal) Tiago Santos
SalPa	Salo	Salon Urheilupuisto	2,500	(Spain) Jordi Aluja
SJK Akatemia	Seinäjoki	OmaSP Stadion	5,817	(England) Ash Civil
TPS	Turku	Veritas Stadion	9,372	(Finland) Miika Nuutinen

== Season ==
=== League table ===
Pos	Team	Pld	W	D	L	GF	GA	GD	Pts	Promotion, qualification or relegation
1	KTP (C, P)	27	18	4	5	75	32	+43	58	Promotion to Veikkausliiga
2	Jaro (O, P)	27	17	3	7	51	30	+21	54	Qualification for the Veikkausliiga play-off
3	JIPPO	27	16	4	7	49	25	+24	52	
4	TPS	27	12	7	8	40	29	+11	43	
5	JäPS	27	9	8	10	44	53	−9	35	
6	PK-35	27	8	9	10	29	34	−5	33	
7	SJK Akatemia	27	6	11	10	35	41	−6	29	
8	SalPa	27	7	8	12	31	48	−17	29	
9	KäPa (O)	27	5	7	15	44	67	−23	22	Qualification for the Ykkösliiga play-off
10	MP (R)	27	3	7	17	22	61	−39	16	Relegation to Ykkönen

Source: Soccerway
Rules for classification: 1) Points; 2) Goal difference; 3) Goals scored; 4) Head-to-head points; 5) Head-to-head goal difference; 6) Head-to-head away goals scored; 7) Play-off
(Note: Play-off is only played if need to decide teams for promotion or relegation).
(C) Champions; (O) Play-off winners; (P) Promoted; (R) Relegated

=== Results ===
Home \ Away	JAR	JIP	JÄP	KTP	KÄP	MP	PK	SAL	SJK	TPS
Jaro	—	1–0	0–0	5–2	4–2	2–0	2–1	2–1	1–1	0–1
JIPPO	2–0	—	3–2	1–0	2–0	0–0	1–0	1–1	0–0	2–0
JäPS	2–2	1–5	—	0–0	2–2	1–1	3–1	2–3	1–1	2–1
KTP	1–0	2–1	2–0	—	2–1	4–0	1–0	6–0	5–1	1–2
KäPa	0–3	1–4	3–3	1–5	—	4–0	0–1	1–1	1–1	0–0
MP	1–4	1–1	0–3	1–2	2–6	—	0–0	0–1	1–2	0–3
PK-35	2–1	0–2	4–1	1–5	3–0	1–2	—	1–1	1–1	1–1
SalPa	0–1	0–3	1–3	2–2	1–1	5–0	1–1	—	2–1	0–1
SJK Akatemia	0–1	1–2	2–1	0–3	4–0	0–0	3–0	2–0	—	0–3
TPS	0–2	2–0	4–0	1–4	2–1	1–0	2–2	2–3	1–0	—

Source: Soccerway
Legend: Blue = home team win; Yellow = draw; Red = away team win.

=== Third round results ===
Home \ Away	JAR	JIP	JÄP	KTP	KÄP	MP	PK	SAL	SJK	TPS
Jaro	—	2–1	5–0	1–2	3–2	—	—	3–0	—	—
JIPPO	—	—	—	3–2	—	2–4	0–1	3–0	4–1	—
JäPS	—	1–4	—	—	—	4–0	—	0–2	2–1	—
KTP	—	—	1–2	—	7–2	—	2–1	—	3–3	1–1
KäPa	—	2–1	3–5	—	—	3–2	1–1	—	—	—
MP	4–2	—	—	0–5	—	—	—	1–2	—	0–0
PK-35	0–1	—	0–0	—	—	1–0	—	1–0	—	—
SalPa	—	—	—	2–5	1–4	—	—	—	1–1	0–0
SJK Akatemia	2–3	—	—	—	2–0	2–2	2–2	—	—	1–1
TPS	3–0	0–1	2–3	—	5–3	—	1–2	—	—	—

Source: Soccerway
Legend: Blue = home team win; Yellow = draw; Red = away team win.

== Ykkösliiga play-off ==
The ninth-placed team (KäPa) faced the second-placed team from the 2024 Ykkönen (KPV) in a two-legged play-off for the final place in the 2025 Ykkösliiga.

=== First leg ===
23 October 2024	KPV	1–1	KäPa	Kokkola
13:00 BST	Cardoso 26' (pen.)		Kuningas 38' (pen.)	Stadium: Kokkolan Keskuskenttä

=== Second leg ===
26 October 2024	KäPa	2–0 (3–1 agg.)	KPV	Helsinki
16:00 BST	Pulkkinen 24'; Lika 59'			Stadium: Brahenkenttä

== Statistics ==
=== Top scorers ===
Rank	Player	Club	Goals
1	(Finland) Aleksi Tarvonen	KTP	15
2	(Finland) Olli Jakonen	SalPa	11
2	(Finland) Luca Weckström	KTP	11
2	(Japan) Yoshiaki Kikuchi	JIPPO	11
5	(Finland) Albijon Muzaci	TPS	10
6	(Finland) Anttoni Huttunen	KTP	9
6	(Finland) Oskar Pihlaja	JIPPO	9
8	(Finland) Irfan Sadik	JäPS	8
8	(Finland) Terrence Smith	JIPPO	8
8	(Nigeria) Umar Bala Mohammed	TPS	8
8	(Finland) Severi Kähkönen	Jaro	8
12	(Finland) Miro Turunen	Käpylän Pallo	7
12	(Sweden) Edvin Crona	Jaro	7

=== Hat-tricks ===
Player	For	Against	Result	Date
(Scotland) Keir Foster	SalPa	MP	5–0	28 April 2024
(Finland) Anttoni Huttunen	KTP	KäPa	5–1	27 July 2024
(Finland) Aapo Hyppönen	MP	JIPPO	4–2	10 August 2024
(Finland) Sami Sipola	Jaro	JäPS	5–0	11 August 2024

== Awards ==
=== Annual awards ===
Award	Winner	Club
Player of the Year	(Finland) Anttoni Huttunen	KTP
Goalkeeper of the Year	(Finland) Pyry Piirainen	JIPPO
Defender of the Year	(Cameroon) Tabi Manga	KTP
Midfielder of the Year	(Finland) Sergei Eremenko	Jaro
Striker of the Year	(Finland) Aleksi Tarvonen	KTP

=== Monthly awards ===
Month	Player of the Month
April	(Finland) Enoch Banza (KTP)
May	(Japan) Yoshiaki Kikuchi (JIPPO)
June	(Finland) Aleksi Tarvonen (KTP)
July	(Finland) Anttoni Huttunen (KTP)
August	(Finland) Matias Paavola (KTP)
September	(Finland) Jean-Claude Mabinda (JäPS)

== Attendances ==
#	Club	Average
1	KTP	1,794
2	TPS	1,552
3	Jaro	1,395
4	MP	658
5	JäPS	633
6	JIPPO	494
7	SalPa	441
8	PK-35	421
9	KäPa	240
10	SJK Akatemia	214
