= Tampereen-Viipurin Ilves-Kissat =

Finnish football club

Ilves-Kissat
- Full name: Tampereen-Viipurin Ilves-Kissat
- Founded: 1932; 94 years ago (as Urheilu-Pojat)
- Chairman: Hanna Räihä-Mäntyharju
- League: Vitonen
- 2025: Vitonen B1, 4th of 9
- Website: ilveskissatjuniorit.fi
Home colours	Away colours

Locations of Viipuri and Tampere within the 1920–1940 borders

Tampereen-Viipurin Ilves-Kissat is a Finnish football club from Tampere. The club plays in Group B1 of Vitonen, the seventh tier of Finnish football. As of 2025, the club has 269 registered players.

== History ==
The club was originally founded as Urheilu-Pojat in Viipuri in the year 1932. The name of the club was changed to Viipurin Ilves (‘Lynx of Viipuri’) in 1934 and as a result of the Winter War, the club was relocated to Tampere in 1940. However, there was a club called Ilves in Tampere, so the club had to change its name to Ilves-Kissat in December of 1944.

Ilves-Kissat were promoted to the Mestaruussarja, the top flight of Finnish football, for the 1949 season and were champions in 1950. The club was relegated in 1951. In 1970 Ilves-Kissat became the first club in Tampere to play in a European tournament when they played against Sturm Graz as a part of the Inter-Cities Fairs Cup.

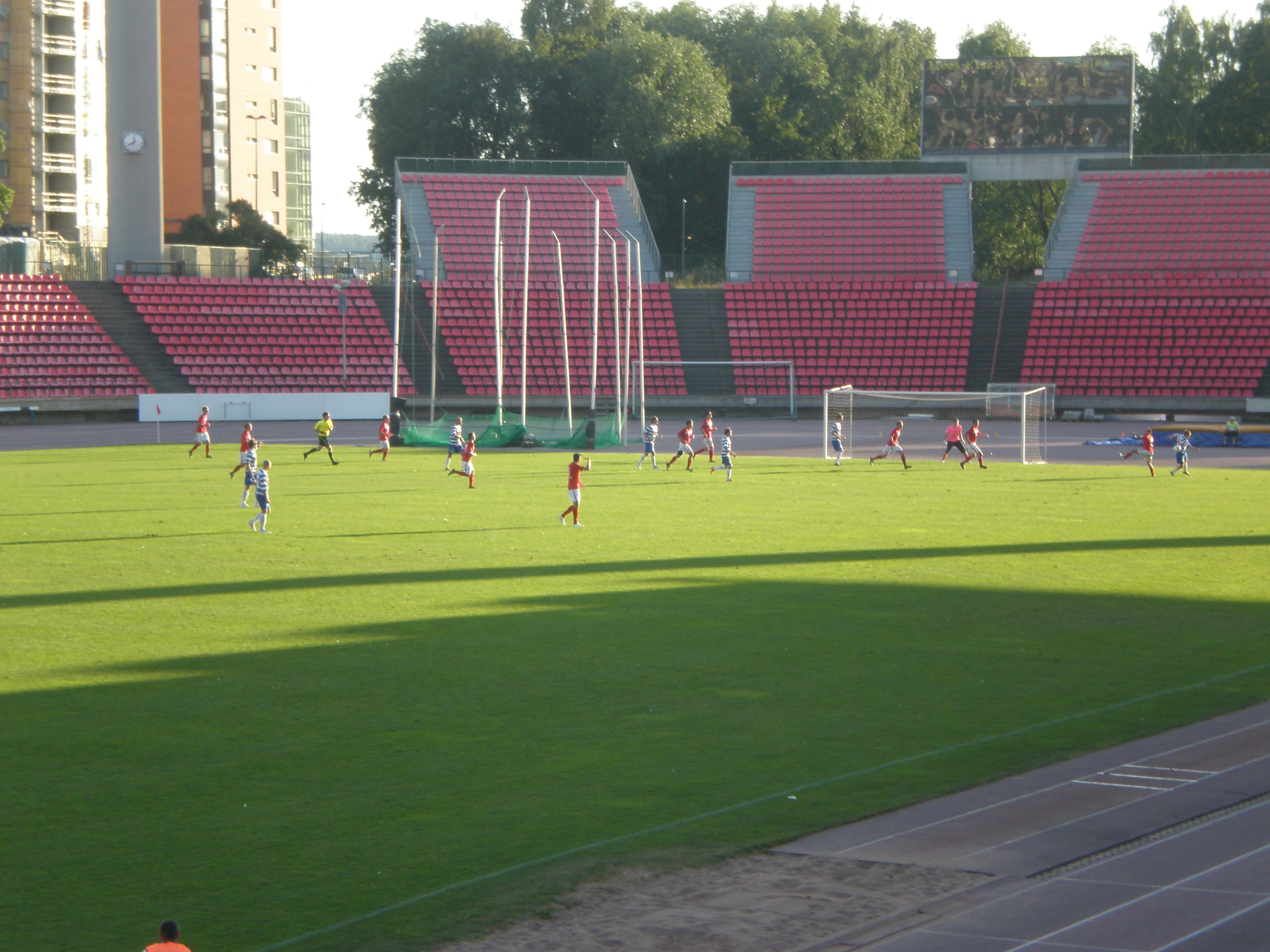
Ilves-Kissat playing at home in the Ratina Stadion against Salon Palloilijat in 2011 Kakkonen in August 2011.

In 1974 Ilves-Kissat and Tampellan Palloilijat merged with Ilves Tampere, which became fully involved in football. Ilves-Kissat discontinued its activities in the sport but on the lower tiers of Finnish football the club was, in a way, represented by its sister club called Kissalan Pojat (namesake of the Katzenjammer Kids).

Ilves-Kissat guild was founded in 1975 to preserve the clubs roots in Viipuri and the guild has arranged trips to Viipuri after the fall of the Soviet Union. In the autumn of 1986 former players and supporters of Ilves-Kissat decided to re-establish the club and Ilves-Kissat started playing in the lower divisions of Finnish football.

In the autumn of 2004 with the clubs football team in the 6th Division, the management of the club decided to make a push for higher tiers and in the autumn of 2010 the club achieved promotion to Kakkonen, the third tier of Finnish football. For the 2011 season Ilves-Kissat entered an arrangement whereby they became the farm team for FC Haka of Valkeakoski, but the season ended with relegation to the 3rd Division.

After the 2023 season in Kakkonen, reports about the clubs financial troubles emerged. The club had to get 18 000 € in under two weeks of the announcement and ultimately failed in achieving that. However, Ukrainian Pavlo Ostrenko decided to acquire the club and saved the club from bankruptcy. Ilves-Kissat played the 2024 season in Kakkonen and was relegated to Kolmonen at the end of the season.

During the 2024 season suspicions about the club being involved in match fixing started to appear. After a risk assessment by the Finnish national gambling company Veikkaus, the company decided not to allow gambling on games where Ilves-Kissat was playing. The possible match fixing committed by the club has been evaluated to be up to millions of euros. After the relegation from Kakkonen, the owner of the club Pavlo Ostrenko decided to stop funding the club and ceased the clubs first teams operations. After 2024, the club is mainly focused on junior football but it also has an amateur team in Vitonen which is the seventh tier of football in Finland.

== Season to season ==
Season to Season

Season	Level	Division	Section	Administration	Position	Movements
1936	Tier 3	Maakuntasarja (Third Division)	East	Finnish FA (Suomen Pallolitto)		Promotion Playoff
1937	Tier 3	Maakuntasarja (Third Division)	East	Finnish FA (Suomen Pallolitto)		
1938	Tier 2	Itä-Länsi-Sarja (Second Division)	East League, Southern Group	Finnish FA (Suomen Pallolitto)	2nd	
1939	Tier 2	Itä-Länsi-Sarja (Second Division)	East League, Southern Group	Finnish FA (Suomen Pallolitto)	3rd	
1940-1944						Wartime - No participation
1945	Tier 2	SPL Suomensarja (Second Division)	Groub B	Finnish FA (Suomen Pallolitto)	3rd	First season in Tampere - Relegated
1945-46	Tier 3	Maakuntasarja (Third Division)	Häme Group	Finnish FA (Suomen Pallolitto)	1st	Promotion Playoff - Promoted
1946-47	Tier 2	SPL Suomensarja (Second Division)	South Group	Finnish FA (Suomen Pallolitto)	5th	
1947-48	Tier 2	SPL Suomensarja (Second Division)	North Group	Finnish FA (Suomen Pallolitto)	2nd	Promotion Group 3rd
1948	Tier 2	Suomensarja (Second Division)	South Group	Finnish FA (Suomen Pallolitto)	1st	Promoted
1949	Tier 1	Mestaruussarja (Premier League)		Finnish FA (Suomen Pallolitto)	7th	
1950	Tier 1	Mestaruussarja (Premier League)		Finnish FA (Suomen Pallolitto)	1st	Champions
1951	Tier 1	Mestaruussarja (Premier League)		Finnish FA (Suomen Pallolitto)	10th	Relegated
1952	Tier 2	Suomensarja (Second Division)	West Group	Finnish FA (Suomen Pallolitto)	10th	Relegated
1953	Tier 3	Maakuntasarja (Third Division)	West Group B	Finnish FA (Suomen Pallolitto)	1st	Promotion Group West 2nd - Promoted
1954	Tier 2	Suomensarja (Second Division)	East Group	Finnish FA (Suomen Pallolitto)	2nd	
1955	Tier 2	Suomensarja (Second Division)	West Group	Finnish FA (Suomen Pallolitto)	1st	Promoted
1956	Tier 1	Mestaruussarja (Premier League)		Finnish FA (Suomen Pallolitto)	4th	
1957	Tier 1	Mestaruussarja (Premier League)		Finnish FA (Suomen Pallolitto)	5th	
1958	Tier 1	Mestaruussarja (Premier League)		Finnish FA (Suomen Pallolitto)	8th	Relegation Playoff - Relegated
1959	Tier 2	Suomensarja (Second Division)	West Group	Finnish FA (Suomen Pallolitto)	4th	
1960	Tier 2	Suomensarja (Second Division)	North Group	Finnish FA (Suomen Pallolitto)	6th	
1961	Tier 2	Suomensarja (Second Division)	West Group	Finnish FA (Suomen Pallolitto)	7th	
1962	Tier 2	Suomensarja (Second Division)	West Group	Finnish FA (Suomen Pallolitto)	2nd	
1963	Tier 2	Suomensarja (Second Division)	West Group	Finnish FA (Suomen Pallolitto)	1st	Promoted
1964	Tier 1	Mestaruussarja (Premier League)		Finnish FA (Suomen Pallolitto)	7th	
1965	Tier 1	Mestaruussarja (Premier League)		Finnish FA (Suomen Pallolitto)	7th	
1966	Tier 1	Mestaruussarja (Premier League)		Finnish FA (Suomen Pallolitto)	8th	
1967	Tier 1	Mestaruussarja (Premier League)		Finnish FA (Suomen Pallolitto)	12th	Relegated
1968	Tier 2	Suomensarja (Second Division)	South Group	Finnish FA (Suomen Pallolitto)	1st	Promotion Group 2nd - Promoted
1969	Tier 1	Mestaruussarja (Premier League)		Finnish FA (Suomen Pallolitto)	6th	
1970	Tier 1	Mestaruussarja (Premier League)		Finnish FA (Suomen Pallolitto)	10th	
1971	Tier 1	Mestaruussarja (Premier League)		Finnish FA (Suomen Pallolitto)	14th	Relegated
1972	Tier 2	Suomensarja (Second Division)	West Group	Finnish FA (Suomen Pallolitto)	1st	Promoted
1973	Tier 1	Mestaruussarja (Premier League)		Finnish FA (Suomen Pallolitto)	10th	
1974	Tier 1	Mestaruussarja (Premier League)		Finnish FA (Suomen Pallolitto)	12th	Relegated
1975-86						Merged with TaPa
1987	Tier 4	III Divisioona (Third Division)	Group 5 - Tampere & Central Finland	Tampere District (SPL Tampere)	6th	
1988	Tier 4	III Divisioona (Third Division)	Group 4 - Tampere & Satakunta	Tampere District (SPL Tampere)	9th	
1989	Tier 4	III Divisioona (Third Division)	Group 5 - Tampere & Central Finland	Tampere District (SPL Tampere)	9th	
1990	Tier 4	III Divisioona (Third Division)	Group 5 - Tampere & Central Finland	Tampere District (SPL Tampere)	6th	
1991	Tier 4	III Divisioona (Third Division)	Group 5 - Tampere & Central Finland	Tampere District (SPL Tampere)	12th	
1992				Tampere District (SPL Tampere)		Unknown
1993				Tampere District (SPL Tampere)		Unknown
1994	Tier 8	Seiska (Seventh Division)		Tampere District (SPL Tampere)	8th	
1995				Tampere District (SPL Tampere)		Unknown
1996				Tampere District (SPL Tampere)		Unknown
1997	Tier 6	Vitonen (Fifth Division)	North Group	Tampere District (SPL Tampere)	9th	
1998	Tier 6	Vitonen (Fifth Division)		Tampere District (SPL Tampere)	11th	
1999				Tampere District (SPL Tampere)		Unknown
2000				Tampere District (SPL Tampere)		Unknown
2001	Tier 7	Kutonen (Sixth Division)	Group 2	Tampere District (SPL Tampere)	6th	
2002	Tier 7	Kutonen (Sixth Division)	Group 2	Tampere District (SPL Tampere)	10th	
2003				Tampere District (SPL Tampere)		Unknown
2004	Tier 7	Kutonen (Sixth Division)	Group 2	Tampere District (SPL Tampere)	1st	Promoted
2005	Tier 6	Vitonen (Fifth Division)	South Group	Tampere District (SPL Tampere)	8th	
2006	Tier 6	Vitonen (Fifth Division)	North Group	Tampere District (SPL Tampere)	5th	
2007	Tier 6	Vitonen (Fifth Division)	Group 3	Tampere District (SPL Tampere)	1st	Promoted
2008	Tier 5	Nelonen (Fourth Division)		Tampere District (SPL Tampere)	2nd	Promoted
2009	Tier 4	Kolmonen (Third Division)		Tampere District (SPL Tampere)	3rd	
2010	Tier 4	Kolmonen (Third Division)		Tampere District (SPL Tampere)	1st	Promotion Playoff - Promoted
2011	Tier 3	Kakkonen (Second Division)	Group B	Finnish FA (Suomen Pallolitto)	11th	Relegated
2012	Tier 4	Kolmonen (Third Division)	Tampere & Satakunta	Tampere District (SPL Tampere)	3rd	
2013	Tier 4	Kolmonen (Third Division)	Tampere & Satakunta	Tampere District (SPL Tampere)	1st	Promoted
2014	Tier 3	Kakkonen (Second Division)	Western Group	Finnish FA (Suomen Pallolitto)	7th	
2015	Tier 3	Kakkonen (Second Division)	Southern Group	Finnish FA (Suomen Pallolitto)	9th	Relegated
2016	Tier 4	Kolmonen (Third Division)	Tampere & Satakunta	Tampere District (SPL Tampere)	2nd	
2017	Tier 4	Kolmonen (Third Division)	Tampere	Tampere District (SPL Tampere)	2nd	
2018	Tier 4	Kolmonen (Third Division)	Tampere	Tampere District (SPL Tampere)	3rd	
2019	Tier 4	Kolmonen (Third Division)	Tampere	Tampere District (SPL Tampere)	2nd	
2020	Tier 4	Kolmonen (Third Division)	Western Group B	Finnish FA (Suomen Pallolitto)	1st	Promotion Playoff - Promoted
2021	Tier 3	Kakkonen (Second Division)	Group B	Finnish FA (Suomen Pallolitto)	10th	

- 15 seasons in Veikkausliiga
- 16 seasons in Ykkönen
- 8 seasons in Kakkonen
- 14 seasons in Kolmonen
- 1 seasons in Nelonen
- 5 seasons in Vitonen
- 3 seasons in Kutonen
- 1 seasons in Seiska
