= 2024 Ykkönen =

Ykkönen
- Season: 2024
- Champions: Klubi 04
- Promoted: Klubi 04
- Relegated: Vaajakoski; VIFK

The 2024 Ykkönen was the 53rd season of Ykkönen, the third highest football league in Finland. The season began on 12 April 2024 and ended on 19 October 2024. It was the first season of the Ykkönen serving as the third-tier football league in Finland, after it was demoted due to formation of the new second-tier Ykkösliiga.

== Teams ==
Club	Location	Stadium	Capacity	Manager
Atlantis FC	Helsinki	Pukinmäen liikuntapuisto	500	(Portugal) Tiago Santos
EPS	Espoo	Espoonlahden urheilupuisto		(Spain) Sven Pierre Aumaitre
FC Jazz	Pori	Pori Stadium	12,300	(Finland) Ville Ulanen
FC Vaajakoski	Vaajakoski, Jyväskylä	Panda Areena	1,000	(Finland) Antti Neuvonen
JJK Jyväskylä	Jyväskylä	Harjun stadion	7,000	(Scotland) Brian Page
Klubi 04	Helsinki	Bolt Arena	10,770	(Finland) Aleksi Lalli
KPV	Kokkola	Kokkolan keskuskenttä	3,000	(Finland) Jyrki Ahola
KuPS II	Kuopio	Väre Areena	5,000	(Finland) Juho Neuvonen
AC Oulu/OLS	Oulu	Castrén	1,000	(Finland) Mikko Isokangas
PK Keski-Uusimaa	Tuusula, Kerava, Järvenpää	Kalevan Urheilupuisto, Kerava	2,500	(Finland) Rami Hakanpää
RoPS	Rovaniemi	Rovaniemen keskuskenttä	2,800	(Finland) Jari Alamäki
Vasa IFK	Vaasa	Hietalahti Stadium	6,009	(Finland) Max Peltonen

== Regular season ==
=== League table ===
Pos	Team	Pld	W	D	L	GF	GA	GD	Pts	Qualification
1	Klubi 04	22	15	5	2	56	16	+40	50	Qualification for the Promotion Round
2	KPV	22	14	5	3	41	28	+13	47	Qualification for the Promotion Round
3	OLS	22	13	4	5	41	25	+16	43	Qualification for the Promotion Round
4	Atlantis	22	10	7	5	36	24	+12	37	Qualification for the Promotion Round
5	Jazz	22	9	4	9	45	45	0	31	Qualification for the Promotion Round
6	RoPS	22	9	3	10	36	34	+2	30	Qualification for the Promotion Round
7	PKKU	22	8	5	9	41	43	−2	29	Qualification for the Relegation Round
8	JJK	22	7	7	8	33	40	−7	28	Qualification for the Relegation Round
9	EPS	22	7	6	9	26	26	0	27	Qualification for the Relegation Round
10	KuPS Akatemia	22	7	3	12	33	45	−12	24	Qualification for the Relegation Round
11	VIFK	22	2	6	14	25	55	−30	12	Qualification for the Relegation Round
12	Vaajakoski	22	2	3	17	26	58	−32	9	Qualification for the Relegation Round

Source: Soccerway
Rules for classification: 1) Points; 2) Goal difference; 3) Goals scored; 4) Head-to-head points; 5) Head-to-head goal difference; 6) Head-to-head away goals scored; 7) Play-off
(Note: Play-off is only played if need to decide champion, teams for relegation or UEFA competition and will be played on a neutral ground).

=== Results ===
Home \ Away	ATL	EPS	JAZ	JJK	KLU	KPV	KPS	OLS	PKK	RPS	VAA	VIF
Atlantis	—	1–1	1–4	4–1	2–2	0–0	3–1	0–0	2–2	0–0	2–0	3–0
EPS	0–1	—	2–0	1–3	2–0	1–1	3–0	0–1	2–2	0–5	5–1	2–0
Jazz	1–3	0–0	—	1–1	0–1	3–3	6–1	3–1	2–3	1–4	3–2	2–1
JJK	0–1	3–1	2–4	—	0–4	0–3	1–2	3–3	2–2	0–0	3–1	0–0
Klubi 04	1–1	0–0	4–1	3–0	—	5–2	4–0	0–0	4–0	3–0	2–0	9–3
KPV	2–0	1–0	3–3	0–2	1–0	—	1–0	1–0	3–2	2–1	3–1	2–1
KuPS Akatemia	2–5	2–1	2–0	1–1	0–2	1–2	—	1–3	1–2	1–2	5–1	2–1
OLS	1–2	2–1	4–0	4–1	1–2	2–1	3–2	—	1–0	4–0	2–1	2–2
PKKU	1–0	1–1	0–3	0–3	1–2	4–5	1–2	3–0	—	3–0	2–1	2–2
RoPS	2–1	2–1	3–1	2–3	0–1	1–2	1–1	0–1	2–3	—	4–2	3–2
Vaajakoski	1–4	0–1	2–4	1–2	2–2	0–2	2–2	0–3	4–3	2–1	—	1–1
VIFK	2–0	0–1	2–3	2–2	0–5	1–1	0–4	2–3	1–4	0–3	2–1	—

Source: Soccerway
Legend: Blue = home team win; Yellow = draw; Red = away team win.

== Promotion Round ==
The top six from the regular season enter the Promotion Round and play each other for the third time. The winner qualifies directly for promotion to Ykkösliiga, whilst the runners-up enter a two-legged playoff against the second to last team in the 2024 Ykkösliiga for promotion.

=== League table ===
Pos	Team	Pld	W	D	L	GF	GA	GD	Pts	Promotion or qualification
1	Klubi 04 (C, P)	27	18	5	4	68	25	+43	59	Promotion to the Ykkösliiga
2	KPV	27	18	5	4	52	32	+20	59	Qualification for the Ykkösliiga play-off
3	OLS	27	14	6	7	54	41	+13	48	
4	Atlantis	27	13	8	6	50	34	+16	47	
5	RoPS	27	10	4	13	41	43	−2	34	
6	Jazz	27	10	4	13	52	59	−7	34	

Source: Soccerway
Rules for classification: 1) Points; 2) Goal difference; 3) Goals scored; 4) Head-to-head points; 5) Head-to-head goal difference; 6) Head-to-head away goals scored; 7) Play-off
(Note: Play-off is only played if need to decide champion, teams for relegation or UEFA competition and will be played on a neutral ground).
(C) Champions; (P) Promoted

=== Results ===
Home \ Away	ATL	JAZ	KLU	KPV	OLS	RPS
Atlantis	—	—	—	1–2	—	3–1
Jazz	2–4	—	—	—	—	1–0
Klubi 04	1–2	3–1	—	—	5–3	—
KPV	—	2–0	1–2	—	—	3–1
OLS	4–4	5–3	—	0–3	—	—
RoPS	—	—	2–1	—	1–1	—

Source: Soccerway
Legend: Blue = home team win; Yellow = draw; Red = away team win.

== Relegation Round ==
The bottom six from the regular season enter the Relegation Round and play each other for the third time. The bottom two sides are relegated to the Kakkonen.

=== League table ===
Pos	Team	Pld	W	D	L	GF	GA	GD	Pts	Relegation
1	JJK	27	11	7	9	42	48	−6	40	
2	PKKU	27	11	5	11	58	56	+2	38	
3	EPS	27	9	7	11	40	40	0	34	
4	KuPS Akatemia	27	8	3	16	41	56	−15	27	
5	VIFK (R)	27	5	7	15	38	63	−25	22	Relegation to the Kakkonen
6	Vaajakoski (R)	27	2	5	20	33	72	−39	11	Relegation to the Kakkonen

Source: Soccerway
Rules for classification: 1) Points; 2) Goal difference; 3) Goals scored; 4) Head-to-head points; 5) Head-to-head goal difference; 6) Head-to-head away goals scored; 7) Play-off
(Note: Play-off is only played if need to decide champion, teams for relegation or UEFA competition and will be played on a neutral ground).
(R) Relegated

=== Results ===
Home \ Away	EPS	JJK	KPS	PKK	VAA	VIF
EPS	—	—	3–2	4–5	—	3–2
JJK	3–2	—	1–0	—	—	0–4
KuPS Akatemia	—	—	—	2–3	3–2	—
PKKU	—	1–2	—	—	5–1	3–4
Vaajakoski	2–2	1–3	—	—	—	—
VIFK	—	—	2–1	—	1–1	—

Source: Soccerway
Legend: Blue = home team win; Yellow = draw; Red = away team win.

== Awards ==
=== Annual awards ===
Award	Winner	Club
Player of the Year	(São Tomé and Príncipe) Ricardo Cardoso	KPV
Goalkeeper of the Year	(Poland) Maciej Raniowski	KPV
Defender of the Year	(Sweden) Nils Svensson	Klubi 04
Midfielder of the Year	(Ghana) Abraham Okyere	KPV
Striker of the Year	(São Tomé and Príncipe) Ricardo Cardoso	KPV
