= Teemu Kankkunen =

Finnish footballer (born 1980)

Personal information
- Date of birth: 13 January 1980 (age 46)
- Place of birth: Helsinki, Finland
- Height: 1.88 m (6 ft 2 in)
- Position: Centre back

Team information
- Current team: JäPS (manager)

Youth career
- –1999: TiPS
- 1999–2001: AC Vantaa

Senior career*
Years	Team	Apps	(Gls)
2001–2002	AC Vantaa	7	(1)
2003–2004	Viikingit	52	(3)
2005–2008	Atlantis	78	(4)
2009–2010	HIFK	?	(?)
2010	TiPS	?	(?)

Managerial career
- 2009: Atlantis U-18
- 2010–2015: HIFK (assistant)
- 2016–2017: HIFK (U19)
- 2018: HIFK
- 2019–2020: HIFK (assistant)
- 2020: HIFK
- 2021: JäPS (management advisor)
- 2021: KTP
- 2022: HIFK (assistant)
- 2022: HIFK (caretaker)
- 2022–2024: HIFK (sporting director)
- 2024–: JäPS
- * Club domestic league appearances and goals

Teemu Kankkunen (born 13 January 1980) is a retired Finnish footballer and who is the head coach of JäPS.

== Career ==
He plays central defender. Height: 6 ft 2 in (188 cm) former clubs: Atlantis FC, FC Viikingit, AC Vantaa, TiPS, in December 2008 retired from professional football and is currently assistant coach of HIFK Helsinki.

== Coaching career ==
Kankkunen was in the 2009 season Youth Head Coach by Atlantis FC. 2010 and 2011: Assistant Coach of HIFK's 1st team.

== Honours ==
Won Finnish Champion in A-junior level (1999, AC Vantaa)
