= FC Vaajakoski =

Finnish football club

- Full name: FC Vaajakoski
- Nickname: FCV
- Founded: 1993; 33 years ago
- Ground: Vaajakosken keskuskenttä, Vaajakoski, Jyväskylä, Finland
- Capacity: 1,000
- Chairman: Lassi Paavolainen
- Manager: Mika Järvinen
- Coach: Anssi Viren
- League: Kolmonen
- 2026: Kakkonen Group C, 10th of 10 (relegated)
Home colours	Away colours

Previous logo

FC Vaajakoski is an active sports club from Vaajakoski, Jyväskylä, Finland. The club was formed in 1993 and their home ground is at the Vaajakosken keskuskenttä. The men's first team currently plays in the Ykkönen, the Finnish third-tier in 2024. The Chairman of FCV is Laasi Paavolainen.

== Background ==
The club was established in 1993 and serves the Vaajakoski-Jyskä area of Jyväskylä. The club currently provides for football, floorball and futsal and has over 300 registered players.

In their short history FCV have already had three spells covering 5 seasons in the Kakkonen (Second Division), the third tier of Finnish football in 2003, 2005–06 and 2009 to the present day.

== Season to season ==
Season to season of FC Vaajakoski

Season	Level	Division	Section	Administration	Position	Movements
2001	Tier 5	Nelonen (Fourth Division)		Central Finland (SPL Keski-Suomi)	1st	Promoted
2002	Tier 4	Kolmonen (Third Division)	Central Finland	Central Finland (SPL Keski-Suomi)	2nd	Promoted
2003	Tier 3	Kakkonen (Second Division)	East Group	Finnish FA (Suomen Pallolitto)	10th	Relegation Playoff - Relegated
2004	Tier 4	Kolmonen (Third Division)	Central Finland	Central Finland (SPL Keski-Suomi)	1st	Promotion Playoff - Promoted
2005	Tier 3	Kakkonen (Second Division)	Eastern Group	Finnish FA (Suomen Pallolitto)	10th	Relegation Playoff
2006	Tier 3	Kakkonen (Second Division)	Group A	Finnish FA (Suomen Pallolitto)	13th	Relegated
2007	Tier 4	Kolmonen (Third Division)	Central Finland	Central Finland (SPL Keski-Suomi)	6th	
2008	Tier 4	Kolmonen (Third Division)	Central Finland	Central Finland (SPL Keski-Suomi)	1st	Promotion Playoff - Promoted
2009	Tier 3	Kakkonen (Second Division)	Group C	Finnish FA (Suomen Pallolitto)	6th	
2010	Tier 3	Kakkonen (Second Division)	Group C	Finnish FA (Suomen Pallolitto)	9th	
2011	Tier 3	Kakkonen (Second Division)	Group C	Finnish FA (Suomen Pallolitto)	13th	Relegated
2012	Tier 4	Kolmonen (Third Division)	Central and Eastern Finland	Central Finland (SPL Keski-Suomi)	5th	
2013	Tier 4	Kolmonen (Third Division)	Central and Eastern Finland	Central Finland (SPL Keski-Suomi)	2nd	
2014	Tier 4	Kolmonen (Third Division)	Central and Eastern Finland	Central Finland (SPL Keski-Suomi)	1st	Promoted
2015	Tier 3	Kakkonen (Second Division)	Southern Group	Finnish FA (Suomen Pallolitto)	6th	
2016	Tier 3	Kakkonen (Second Division)	Group A	Finnish FA (Suomen Pallolitto)	11th	Relegated
2017	Tier 4	Kolmonen (Third Division)	Central and Eastern Finland	Central Finland (SPL Keski-Suomi)	2nd	Promoted
2018	Tier 3	Kakkonen (Second Division)	Group A	Finnish FA (Suomen Pallolitto)	10th	
2019	Tier 3	Kakkonen (Second Division)	Group C	Finnish FA (Suomen Pallolitto)	5th	
2020	Tier 3	Kakkonen (Second Division)	Group C	Finnish FA (Suomen Pallolitto)	7th	
2021	Tier 3	Kakkonen (Second Division)	Group C	Finnish FA (Suomen Pallolitto)	4th	
2022	Tier 3	Kakkonen (Second Division)	Group C	Finnish FA (Suomen Pallolitto)	8th	
2023	Tier 3	Kakkonen (Second Division)	Group C	Finnish FA (Suomen Pallolitto)	2nd	Promotion Playoff - Promoted
2024	Tier 3	Ykkönen (First Division)		Finnish FA (Suomen Pallolitto)	12th	Relegated
2025	Tier 4	Kakkonen (Second Division)	Group A	Finnish FA (Suomen Pallolitto)		

- 15 seasons in 3rd Tier
- 9 seasons in 4th Tier
- 1 season in 5th Tier

== Club Structure ==
FCV runs 3 men's teams and several boys teams.

== Club teams ==
FCV Men's Team are participating in Kakkonen administered by the Football Association of Finland (Suomen Palloliitto). It is the third highest tier in the Finnish football system. In 2009 FCV finished in sixth position in their Kakkonen section.

FCV Reds are participating in the Vitonen (Fifth Division) section administered by the Keski-Suomi SPL.

== 2018 season ==
FCV got promoted to Kakkonen for season 2018, as a result of OPS failing to meet license regulations in Ykkönen and refusing to take part in Kakkonen. Current manager of the squad, Mika Järvinen has been in charge since 2013.

== Current squad (2026) ==
Note: Flags indicate national team as defined under FIFA eligibility rules; some limited exceptions apply. Players may hold more than one non-FIFA nationality.

No.	Pos.	Nation	Player
—	ST	FIN	Genc Kovaqi
—	FW	FIN	Eero Salmi
—	FW	FIN	Tomi Koskiahde
—	MF	FIN	Abenezer Eloranta
17	MF	FIN	Lauri Seilonen
6	MF	FIN	Lasse Laakso
11	MF	FIN	Simo Kurkisuo
—	MF	FIN	Tiitus Mäkinen
—	MF	FIN	Tuomas Stadig
—	DF	FIN	Akseli Aarnu
3	DC	FIN	Juuso Sarkkinen
6	DF	FIN	Viljami Suihkonen
—	DF	FIN	Matias Collin
—	GK	FIN	Kalle Kemppainen
13	GK	FIN	Santtu Toivari

== References and sources ==
- Official Website
- Suomen Cup
