= 2019 Ykkönen =

Ykkönen
- Season: 2019
- Champions: FC Haka
- Promoted: FC Haka; TPS
- Relegated: TPV

The 2019 Ykkönen was the 48th season of Ykkönen, the second highest football league in Finland. The season started on 27 April 2019. The winning team was qualified promoted to the 2020 Veikkausliiga, while the second-placed team played a play-off against the eleventh-placed team from Veikkausliiga to decide who would play in that division. The bottom team was relegated to Kakkonen.

== Overview ==
Location of teams in Ykkönen 2019

A total of ten teams contested in the league, including six sides from the 2018 season, TPS was relegated from Veikkausliiga and MYPA, MuSa and TPV who were promoted from Kakkonen after winning the promotion play-offs.

Club	Location	Stadium	Capacity	Manager
AC Kajaani	Kajaani	Kajaanin Liikuntapuisto	1,200	(Finland) Mika Lumijärvi
AC Oulu	Oulu	Raatin Stadion	6,996	(Finland) Rauno Ojanen
EIF	Raseborg	Ekenäs Centrumplan	2,500	(Spain) Guillem Santesmases
FC Haka	Valkeakoski	Tehtaan kenttä	3,516	(Finland) Teemu Tainio
FC KTP	Kotka	Arto Tolsa Areena	4,780	(Estonia) Argo Arbeiter
FF Jaro	Jakobstad	Jakobstads Centralplan	4,600	(Finland) Niklas Käcko
TPS	Turku	Paavo Nurmi Stadium	13,000	(Finland) Tommi Pikkarainen
MuSa	Pori	Porin Stadion	12,300	(Finland) Ville Ulanen
MYPA	Kouvola	Kymenlaakson Sähkö Stadion	4,167	(Finland) Jukka Karjalainen
TPV	Tampere	Tammelan Stadion	5,050	(Finland) Anssi Ylinen

== League table ==
Pos	Team	Pld	W	D	L	GF	GA	GD	Pts	Qualification or relegation
1	FC Haka (P)	27	24	2	1	76	22	+54	74	Promotion to Veikkausliiga
2	TPS (O, P)	27	16	7	4	45	23	+22	55	Qualification to Promotion play-offs
3	FF Jaro	27	12	7	8	53	40	+13	43	
4	KTP	27	13	3	11	46	44	+2	42	
5	MuSa	27	11	5	11	40	54	−14	38	
6	EIF	27	9	3	15	42	55	−13	30	
7	AC Oulu	27	7	8	12	34	30	+4	29	
8	AC Kajaani	27	6	6	15	40	52	−12	24	
9	MYPA	27	5	7	15	30	62	−32	22	
10	TPV (R)	27	5	6	16	30	54	−24	21	Relegation to Kakkonen

Source: Suomen Palloliitto
Rules for classification: 1) Points; 2) Goal difference; 3) Number of goals scored
(O) Play-off winners; (P) Promoted; (R) Relegated

== Promotion/relegation play-offs ==
24 October 2019
18:30 EET (UTC+2)

TPS	0–0	KPV
	Report

Veritas Stadion, Turku
Attendance: 3,376
Referee: Kalle Mäkinen
27 October 2019
17:00 EET (UTC+2)

KPV	0–3	TPS
	Report	Ääritalo 44'; Jakonen 67'; Duah 90+2'

Kokkolan keskuskenttä, Kokkola
Attendance: 1,200
Referee: Ville Nevalainen

TPS won 3-0 on aggregate and are promoted

== Season statistics ==
=== Top scorers ===
As of match played 31 October 2019

Rank	Player	Club	Goals
1	(Finland) Salomo Ojala	FC Haka	23
2	(Colombia) Eliécer Espinosa	TPS	18
3	(Mexico) Jahir Barraza	FF Jaro	15
4	(Finland) Aleksi Pahkasalo	KTP	13
5	(Finland) Kalle Multanen	KTP	11
5	(Finland) Akseli Ollila	EIF	11
7	(Finland) Juho Mäkelä	IFK Mariehamn	10
