= 2018 Ykkönen =

Ykkönen
- Season: 2018
- Champions: HIFK
- Promoted: HIFK; KPV
- Relegated: JJK; Klubi 04
- Matches played: 135
- Goals scored: 371 (2.75 per match)
- Top goalscorer: Alberto Alvarado Morín (17 goals)

The 2018 Ykkönen was the 47th season of Ykkönen, the second highest football league in Finland. The season began on 28 April 2018 and ended on 27 October 2018. The winning team was directly promoted to the 2019 Veikkausliiga, while the second-placed team played a play-off against the eleventh-placed team from Veikkausliiga to decide who would play in that division. The bottom two teams were relegated to Kakkonen.

== Overview ==
Location of teams in Ykkönen 2018

A total of ten teams contested in the league, including five sides from the 2017 season, HIFK and JJK who was relegated from Veikkausliiga and Klubi 04 and AC Kajaani who were promoted from Kakkonen after winning the promotion play-offs.

OPS, who was refused a license for Ykkönen, was replaced by FC KTP.

GrIFK and Gnistan were relegated from 2017 Ykkönen.

TPS, the champion of 2017 Ykkönen and FC Honka, the runner-up of 2017 Ykkönen were promoted to the 2018 Veikkausliiga.

Club	Location	Stadium	Capacity	Manager
AC Kajaani	Kajaani	Kajaanin Liikuntapuisto	1,000	(Finland) Mika Lumijärvi
AC Oulu	Oulu	Raatin Stadion	6,996	(Finland) Mika Lähderinne
EIF	Raseborg	Ekenäs Centrumplan	2,500	(Spain) Gabri Garcia Xatart
FC Haka	Valkeakoski	Tehtaan kenttä	3,516	(England) (Finland) Keith Armstrong
FC KTP	Kotka	Arto Tolsa Areena	4,780	(Finland) Jari-Pekka Gummerus
FF Jaro	Jakobstad	Jakobstads Centralplan	5,000	(Finland) Tomi Kärkkäinen
HIFK	Helsinki	Telia 5G -areena	10,770	(Finland) Teemu Kankkunen
JJK	Jyväskylä	Harjun stadion	3,000	(Finland) Juha Pasoja
Klubi 04	Helsinki	Telia 5G -areena	10,770	(Finland) Mikko Mannila
KPV	Kokkola	Kokkolan Keskuskenttä	2,000	(Finland) Jarmo Korhonen

== League table ==
Pos	Team	Pld	W	D	L	GF	GA	GD	Pts	Qualification or relegation
1	HIFK (P)	27	16	6	5	47	22	+25	54	Promotion to Veikkausliiga
2	KPV (O, P)	27	16	4	7	44	26	+18	52	Qualification to Promotion play-offs
3	EIF	27	12	11	4	36	26	+10	47	
4	AC Oulu	27	13	5	9	41	30	+11	44	
5	FC Haka	27	12	7	8	41	28	+13	43	
6	FF Jaro	27	11	5	11	34	30	+4	38	
7	FC KTP	27	7	8	12	29	40	−11	29	
8	AC Kajaani	27	6	7	14	40	53	−13	25	
9	JJK (R)	27	4	8	15	32	52	−20	20	Relegation to Kakkonen
10	Klubi 04 (R)	27	4	7	16	27	64	−37	19	Relegation to Kakkonen

Source: Suomen Palloliitto
Rules for classification: 1) Points; 2) Goal difference; 3) Number of goals scored
(O) Play-off winners; (P) Promoted; (R) Relegated
