= Tehtaan kenttä =

Football stadium in Valkeakoski, Finland

- Tehtis
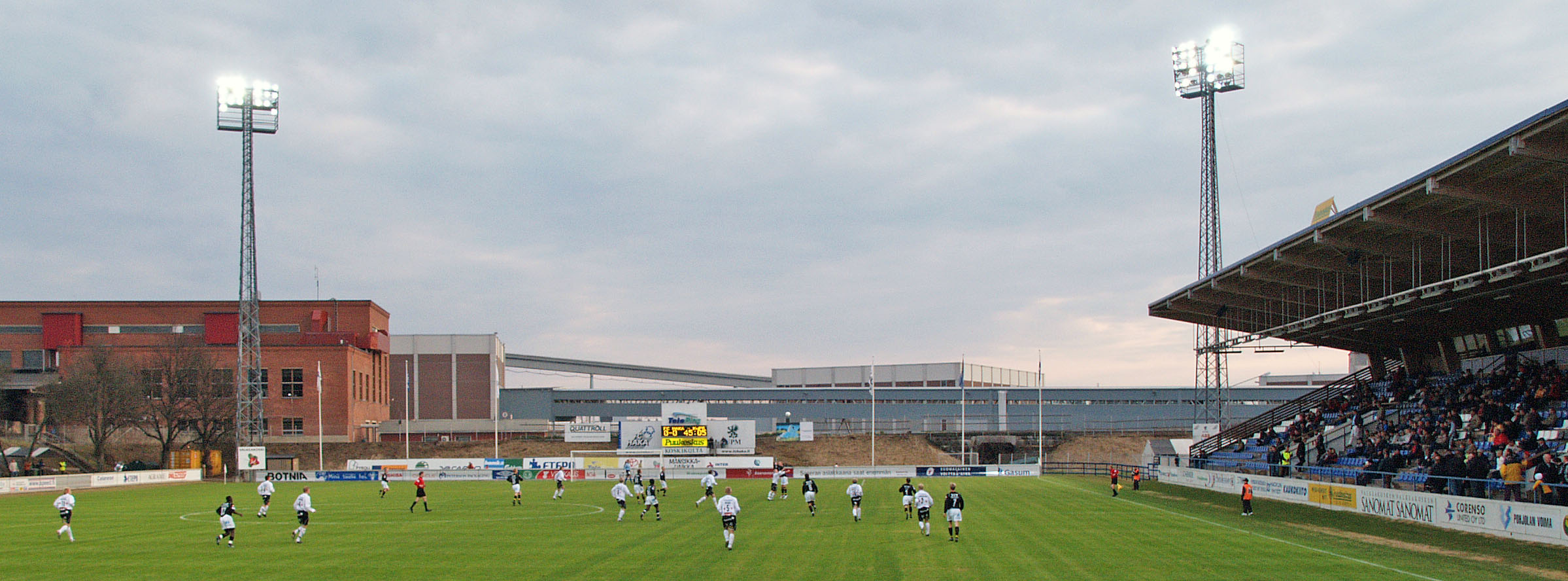
- Interactive map of Tehtaan kenttä
- Full name: Tehtaan kenttä
- Location: Valkeakoski, Finland
- Coordinates: 61°16′05″N 24°01′13″E
- Owner: Valkeakosken Tehtis Oy
- Operator: City of Valkeakoski
- Capacity: 3,516 (allseater)
- Surface: Artificial turf
- Field size: 105 x 68 m

Construction
- Opened: 1934

Tenant
- FC Haka

Tehtaan kenttä (Swedish: Fabriksplan, Eng. lit. Factory's field) is a 1934 opened football stadium in the 1st district of Valkeakoski, Finland, and the home of Veikkausliiga club FC Haka. The stadium holds an attendance capacity of 3,516. The record for attendance is 6,401 and was set in a game against rival team HJK Helsinki in 1999. In addition to its history, the stadium is noted especially for its surroundings, while located in a big park and having the nearby UPM-Kymmene paper mill lay at the southwestern end of the pitch.

The name (lit. the factory pitch) derives from UPM's ownership of the stadium (until being sold in 2014) as well as the stadium's proximity to and open view of the paper mill characteristic to the town of Valkeakoski.

The turf was changed from natural grass to artificial in November 2014.

After Haka's relegation in 2025, the stadium was damaged in a fire which destroyed a stand and damaged the artificial grass.

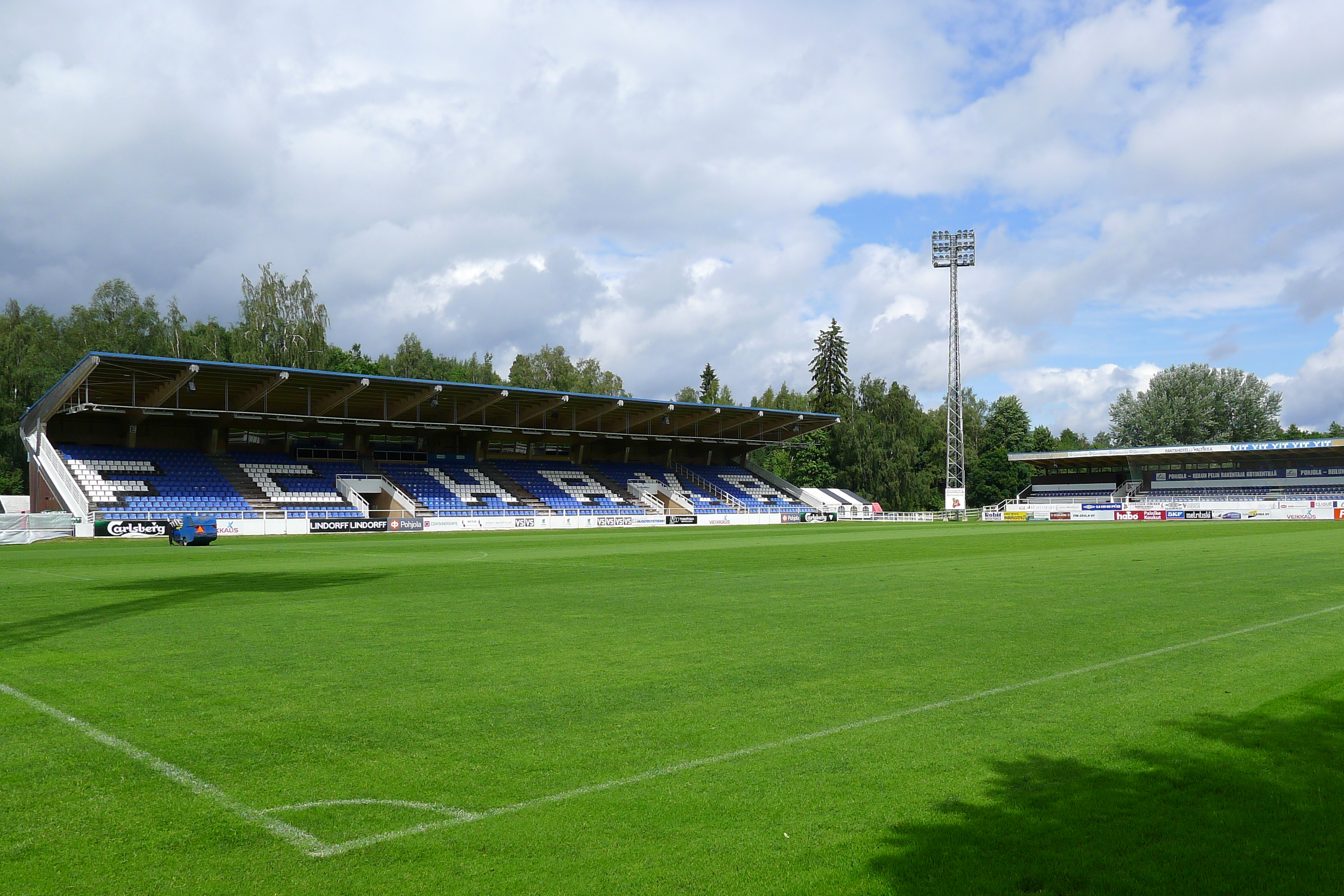
Tehtaan kenttä with natural grass in 2012
