= 2023 Kakkonen =

Kakkonen
- Season: 2023
- Champions: PK-35 Vantaa
- Promoted: Atlantis (to Ykkönen); EPS (to Ykkönen); Jazz Pori (to Ykkönen); JIPPO (to Ykkösliiga); Klubi 04 (to Ykkönen); OLS (to Ykkönen); PK Keski-Uusimaa (to Ykkönen); PK-35 Vantaa (to Ykkösliiga); RoPS (to Ykkönen); VIFK (to Ykkönen)
- Relegated: Futura; Hercules; JBK; PIF; SexyPöxyt; TiPS

The 2023 Kakkonen was the 51st season of Kakkonen, the third-highest football league in Finland. The season began on 21 April 2023 and ended on 8 October 2023. It was the final season of the Kakkonen serving as the third-tier football league in Finland, following its demotion to fourth-tier.

The three groups winners and the highest-ranked runner up qualified for the Kakkonen Championship play-offs, with the winners (PK-35 Vantaa) and runners-up (JIPPO) being promoted to the 2024 Ykkösliiga.

The second, third, fourth, and fifth-placed teams in each group (minus the highest-ranked runner-up) qualified for the Kakkonen play-offs; the five winners (Atlantis, Klubi 04, PK Keski-Uusimaa, RoPS, and VIFK) joined the highest-ranked runner-up (Jazz Pori), the two losing semi-final teams from the Kakkonen Championship play-offs (EPS and OLS), and the two teams relegated from the 2023 Ykkönen (JJK and KPV) in the 2024 Ykkönen.

The bottom two teams in each group (Futura, Hercules, JBK, PIF, SexyPöxyt, and TiPS) were relegated to the 2024 Kolmonen.

== Teams ==
The league consisted of thirty-six teams (twenty-seven returning from the previous season, six promoted from Kolmonen, and three relegated from Ykkönen), split into three equal groups (A, B, and C).

=== Team changes ===
Promoted from 2022 Kolmonen	Promoted to 2023 Ykkönen	Relegated from 2022 Ykkönen	Relegated to 2023 Kolmonen
Atlantis 2 Elo Kuopio; Pallo-Iirot; SexyPöxyt; TiPS; TP-47	JJK; KäPa; SalPa	PEPO; PIF; PK-35	KaaPo; KajHa; Komeetat; LaPa; MuSa; PeKa; VJS

=== Group A ===
Team	Town
Atlantis 2	Helsinki
Futura	Porvoo
JIPPO	Joensuu
Kiffen	Helsinki
Klubi 04	Helsinki
NJS	Nurmijärvi
PEPO	Lappeenranta
PK Keski-Uusimaa	Järvenpää, Kerava and Tuusula
PK-35	Vantaa
PPJ	Helsinki
Reipas Lahti	Lahti
TiPS	Tikkurila

=== Group B ===
Team Name	Town
Atlantis	Helsinki
EPS	Espoonlahti
GrIFK	Kauniainen
HJS	Hämeenlinna
Honka Akatemia	Espoo
Ilves 2	Tampere
Ilves-Kissat	Tampere
Jazz Pori	Pori
Pallo-Iirot	Rauma
PIF	Pargas
SexyPöxyt	Laaksolahti
Tampere United	Tampere

=== Group C ===
Team Name	Town
Elo Kuopio	Kuopio
GBK Kokkola	Kokkola
Hercules	Oulu
JBK	Jakobstad
KuPS Akatemia	Kuopio
Närpes Kraft	Närpes
OLS	Oulu
OTP	Oulu
RoPS	Rovaniemi
TP-47	Tornio
Vaajakoski	Vaajakoski
VIFK	Vaasa

== League tables ==
=== Group A ===
Pos	Team	Pld	W	D	L	GF	GA	GD	Pts	Promotion, qualification or relegation
1	JIPPO (P)	22	15	3	4	56	19	+37	48	Qualification for the Kakkonen Championship play-offs and promotion to the Ykkösliiga (Note: Despite losing the Kakkonen Championship play-off final, JIPPO were promoted to the Ykkösliiga after Gnistan were promoted to the Veikkausliiga to replace Honka and KäPa were given a reprieve in the Ykkönen to replace HIFK.)
2	PK-35 (C, O, P)	22	14	6	2	49	21	+28	48	Qualification for the Kakkonen Championship play-offs and promotion to the Ykkösliiga
3	Klubi 04 (O, P)	22	13	5	4	41	16	+25	44	Qualification for the Kakkonen play-offs and promotion to the Ykkönen
4	Reipas Lahti	22	8	8	6	31	25	+6	32	Qualification for the Kakkonen play-offs
5	PK Keski-Uusimaa (O, P)	22	9	5	8	44	39	+5	32	Qualification for the Kakkonen play-offs and promotion to the Ykkönen
6	NJS	22	9	3	10	34	30	+4	30	
7	PEPO	22	9	3	10	45	44	+1	30	
8	Atlantis 2	22	6	9	7	20	32	−12	27	
9	PPJ	22	7	5	10	43	41	+2	26	
10	Kiffen	22	7	5	10	21	33	−12	26	
11	Futura (R)	22	5	4	13	30	58	−28	19	Relegation to the Kolmonen
12	TiPS (R)	22	0	4	18	20	76	−56	4	Relegation to the Kolmonen

Source: Soccerway
Rules for classification: 1) Points; 2) Goal difference; 3) Goals scored; 4) Head-to-head points; 5) Head-to-head goal difference; 6) Head-to-head goals scored; 7) Fewer away goals conceded; 8) Home goals scored; 9) Fewer home goals conceded; 10) Play-off; 11) Draw.
(C) Champions; (O) Play-off winners; (P) Promoted; (R) Relegated

=== Group B ===
Pos	Team	Pld	W	D	L	GF	GA	GD	Pts	Promotion, qualification or relegation
1	EPS (P)	22	15	3	4	50	20	+30	48	Qualification for Kakkonen Championship play-offs and promotion to the Ykkönen
2	Jazz Pori (P)	22	14	3	5	63	31	+32	45	Promotion to the Ykkönen
3	Ilves-Kissat	22	13	4	5	53	43	+10	43	Qualification for the Kakkonen play-offs
4	Atlantis (O, P)	22	13	2	7	54	30	+24	41	Qualification for the Kakkonen play-offs and promotion to the Ykkönen
5	Tampere United	22	11	4	7	40	32	+8	37	Qualification for the Kakkonen play-offs
6	GrIFK	22	10	5	7	39	40	−1	35	
7	Honka Akatemia	22	9	5	8	39	42	−3	32	
8	Pallo-Iirot	22	10	0	12	37	34	+3	30	
9	Ilves 2	22	6	2	14	28	50	−22	20	
10	HJS	22	5	3	14	28	45	−17	18	
11	SexyPöxyt (R)	22	4	4	14	20	51	−31	16	Relegation to the Kolmonen
12	PIF (R)	22	3	3	16	25	58	−33	12	Relegation to the Kolmonen

Source: Soccerway
Rules for classification: 1) Points; 2) Goal difference; 3) Goals scored; 4) Head-to-head points; 5) Head-to-head goal difference; 6) Head-to-head goals scored; 7) Fewer away goals conceded; 8) Home goals scored; 9) Fewer home goals conceded; 10) Play-off; 11) Draw.
(O) Play-off winners; (P) Promoted; (R) Relegated

=== Group C ===
Pos	Team	Pld	W	D	L	GF	GA	GD	Pts	Promotion, qualification or relegation
1	OLS (P)	22	13	6	3	53	22	+31	45	Qualification for the Kakkonen Championship play-offs and promotion to the Ykkönen
2	Vaajakoski	22	13	6	3	43	17	+26	45	Qualification for the Kakkonen play-offs
3	RoPS (O, P)	22	12	3	7	42	37	+5	39	Qualification for the Kakkonen play-offs and promotion to the Ykkönen
4	KuPS Akatemia	22	11	4	7	33	27	+6	37	Qualification for the Kakkonen play-offs
5	VIFK (O, P)	22	10	4	8	36	31	+5	34	Qualification for the Kakkonen play-offs and promotion to the Ykkönen
6	OTP	22	10	3	9	37	33	+4	33	
7	GBK Kokkola	22	8	7	7	33	41	−8	31	
8	TP-47	22	8	4	10	35	35	0	28	
9	Närpes Kraft	22	6	7	9	30	37	−7	25	
10	Elo Kuopio	22	5	4	13	24	39	−15	19	
11	Hercules (R)	22	5	4	13	23	48	−25	19	Relegation to the Kolmonen
12	JBK (R)	22	2	6	14	26	48	−22	12	Relegation to the Kolmonen

Source: Soccerway
Rules for classification: 1) Points; 2) Goal difference; 3) Goals scored; 4) Head-to-head points; 5) Head-to-head goal difference; 6) Head-to-head goals scored; 7) Fewer away goals conceded; 8) Home goals scored; 9) Fewer home goals conceded; 10) Play-off; 11) Draw.
(O) Play-off winners; (P) Promoted; (R) Relegated

== Play-offs ==
=== Kakkonen play-offs ===
The second to fifth teams in each group (minus the highest ranked runner-up) competed in play-off matches, with the five winners earning promotion to the 2024 Ykkönen.

==== First leg ====
14 October 2023	Reipas Lahti (4th, Group A)	2–3	RoPS (3rd, Group C)
11:00 BST

14 October 2023	VIFK (5th, Group C)	0–0	Ilves-Kissat (3rd, Group B)
16:00 BST

15 October 2023	KuPS Akatemia (4th, Group C)	0–3	Atlantis (4th, Group B)
15:00 BST

21 October 2023	PK Keski-Uusimaa (5th, Group A)	4–1	Vaajakoski (2nd, Group C)
11:00 BST

21 October 2023	Tampere United (5th, Group B)	2–1	Klubi 04 (3rd, Group A)
14:00 BST

==== Second leg ====
21 October 2023	RoPS (3rd, Group C)	1–1 (4–3 agg.)	Reipas Lahti (4th, Group A)
12:00 BST

22 October 2023	Ilves-Kissat (3rd, Group B)	1–1 (a.e.t.) (1–1 agg.) (1–4 p)	VIFK (5th, Group C)
12:00 BST

22 October 2023	Atlantis (4th, Group B)	3–1 (6–1 agg.)	KuPS Akatemia (4th, Group C)
13:00 BST

28 October 2023	Vaajakoski (2nd, Group C)	3–1 (4–5 agg.)	PK Keski-Uusimaa (5th, Group A)
11:00 BST

29 October 2023	Klubi 04 (3rd, Group A)	4–0 (5–2 agg.)	Tampere United (5th, Group B)
14:00 BST

=== Kakkonen Championship play-offs ===
The three group winners and highest ranked runner-up competed in a play-off, with the winner earning promotion to the 2024 Ykkösliiga and the rest qualifying for the 2024 Ykkönen.

==== Semi-finals ====
14 October 2023	JIPPO (1st, Group A)	0–0 (a.e.t.) (5–3 p)	OLS (1st, Group C)
13:00 BST

15 October 2023	PK-35 (2nd, Group A)	2–1	EPS (1st, Group B)
12:00 BST

==== Final ====
===== First leg =====
21 October 2023	PK-35 (2nd, Group A)	0–0	JIPPO (1st, Group A)
13:00 BST

===== Second leg =====
28 October 2023	JIPPO (1st, Group A)	2–3 (a.e.t.) (2–3 agg.)	PK-35 (2nd, Group A)
13:00 BST
