= 2023 Ykkönen =

Ykkönen
- Season: 2023
- Champions: EIF
- Promoted: EIF; Gnistan
- Relegated: JJK; KPV

The 2023 Ykkönen was the 52nd season of Ykkönen, the second highest football league in Finland. The season began on 14 April 2023 and ended on 7 October 2023. It was the final season of the Ykkönen serving as the second-tier football league in Finland, following its demotion to third-tier.

Twelve teams contested the league. The champions (EIF) and runners-up (Gnistan) were promoted to the 2024 Veikkausliiga. The second, third, and fourth-placed teams (Gnistan, MP, and SJK Akatemia) qualified for the Veikkausliiga play-off. The bottom two teams (JJK and KPV) were relegated to the 2024 Ykkönen. The sixth-placed team (HIFK) dissolved after the season finished due to bankruptcy, giving the tenth-placed team (KäPa) a reprieve from relegation. The remaining teams were transferred to the 2024 Ykkösliiga.

The 2024 Ykkönen will represent the new third-tier level season of Finnish football.

== Teams ==
=== Team changes ===
Promoted from 2022 Kakkonen	Promoted to 2023 Veikkausliiga	Relegated from 2022 Veikkausliiga	Relegated to 2023 Kakkonen
JJK; KäPa; SalPa	KTP	HIFK	PEPO; PIF; PK-35 Vantaa

=== Participants ===
Club	Location	Stadium	Capacity
EIF	Raseborg	Ekenäs Centrumplan	800
Gnistan	Helsinki	Mustapekka Areena	1,100
HIFK	Helsinki	Bolt Arena	10,770
JäPS	Järvenpää	Järvenpään keskuskenttä	2,000
Jaro	Jakobstad	Jakobstads Centralplan	5,000
JJK	Jyväskylä	Harjun Stadion	5,000
KäPa	Helsinki	Brahenkenttä	1,200
KPV	Kokkola	Kokkolan keskuskenttä	3,000
MP	Mikkeli	Mikkelin Urheilupuisto	7,000
SalPa	Salo	Salon Urheilupuisto	750
SJK Akatemia	Seinäjoki	OmaSP Stadion	5,817
TPS	Turku	Veritas Stadion	8,076

== Regular season ==
=== League table ===
Pos	Team	Pld	W	D	L	GF	GA	GD	Pts	Qualification
1	EIF	22	14	6	2	38	18	+20	48	Qualification for the Promotion Round
2	Gnistan	22	14	6	2	38	18	+20	48	Qualification for the Promotion Round
3	MP	22	12	5	5	33	21	+12	41	Qualification for the Promotion Round
4	TPS	22	12	4	6	40	25	+15	40	Qualification for the Promotion Round
5	SJK Akatemia	22	12	3	7	37	35	+2	39	Qualification for the Promotion Round
6	HIFK	22	8	6	8	27	29	−2	30	Qualification for the Promotion Round
7	SalPa	22	7	5	10	30	27	+3	26	Qualification for the Relegation Round
8	JäPS	22	5	6	11	26	37	−11	21	Qualification for the Relegation Round
9	Jaro	22	4	9	9	22	35	−13	21	Qualification for the Relegation Round
10	KäPa	22	5	5	12	37	47	−10	20	Qualification for the Relegation Round
11	KPV	22	2	9	11	20	34	−14	15	Qualification for the Relegation Round
12	JJK	22	2	6	14	20	42	−22	12	Qualification for the Relegation Round

Source: Soccerway
Rules for classification: 1) Points; 2) Goal difference; 3) Goals scored; 4) Head-to-head points; 5) Head-to-head goal difference; 6) Head-to-head away goals scored; 7) Play-off
(Note: Play-off is only played if need to decide champion, teams for relegation or UEFA competition and will be played on a neutral ground).

=== Results ===
Home \ Away	EIF	GNI	HIF	JÁP	JAR	JJK	KÁP	KPV	MP	SAI	SJK	TPS
EIF	—	1–0	0–0	2–2	3–0	3–0	2–1	2–2	2–1	1–0	2–1	2–1
Gnistan	0–0	—	4–0	0–0	1–1	2–0	1–0	2–1	1–1	3–2	5–2	0–3
HIFK	0–2	0–2	—	2–0	1–1	4–2	1–0	1–0	0–2	2–2	1–2	2–0
JäPS	1–0	1–2	2–3	—	2–0	1–1	4–4	0–3	1–3	0–0	1–3	1–2
Jaro	1–1	2–2	3–0	1–1	—	2–2	1–1	1–0	0–2	1–0	0–1	3–3
JJK	0–2	2–3	0–0	1–2	3–1	—	1–2	0–0	0–1	0–1	2–0	2–2
KäPa	2–3	0–2	0–2	3–1	2–3	4–0	—	1–1	2–0	2–3	4–4	2–0
KPV	2–3	1–2	0–4	1–2	1–1	0–0	1–1	—	2–4	1–0	1–1	0–0
MP	0–0	0–0	2–1	0–2	1–0	4–3	6–2	1–0	—	0–0	2–0	0–1
SalPa	1–2	1–3	1–1	2–1	3–0	3–0	2–0	2–2	1–2	—	1–2	3–0
SJK Akatemia	0–4	0–1	2–2	2–0	1–0	3–1	5–3	2–0	2–0	2–1	—	1–0
TPS	3–1	0–2	2–0	2–1	4–0	2–0	4–1	4–1	1–1	2–1	4–1	—

Source: Soccerway
Legend: Blue = home team win; Yellow = draw; Red = away team win.

== Promotion Round ==
=== League table ===
Pos	Team	Pld	W	D	L	GF	GA	GD	Pts	Promotion or qualification
1	EIF (C, P)	27	18	7	2	49	22	+27	61	Promotion to the Veikkausliiga
2	Gnistan (P)	27	16	9	2	49	26	+23	57	Qualification for the Veikkausliiga play-off semi-finals and promotion to the Veikkausliiga (Note: Despite losing the Veikkausliiga play-off final, Gnistan were promoted after Honka were demoted from the Veikkausliiga due to financial issues.)
3	MP	27	13	7	7	40	30	+10	46	Qualification for the Veikkausliiga play-off quarter-finals
4	SJK Akatemia	27	13	5	9	46	45	+1	44	Qualification for the Veikkausliiga play-off quarter-finals
5	TPS	27	12	5	10	45	37	+8	41	
6	HIFK	27	10	7	10	37	39	−2	37	Club folded

Source: Soccerway
Rules for classification: 1) Points; 2) Goal difference; 3) Goals scored; 4) Head-to-head points; 5) Head-to-head goal difference; 6) Head-to-head away goals scored; 7) Play-off
(Note: Play-off is only played if need to decide champion, teams for relegation or UEFA competition and will be played on a neutral ground).
(C) Champions; (P) Promoted

=== Results ===
Home \ Away	EIF	GNI	HIF	MP	SJK	TPS
EIF	—	3–3	2–0	—	1–0	—
Gnistan	—	—	—	1–1	3–2	2–0
HIFK	—	2–2	—	3–2	—	—
MP	0–2	—	—	—	2–2	2–1
SJK Akatemia	—	—	3–2	—	—	2–2
TPS	1–3	—	1–3	—	—	—

Legend: Blue = home team win; Yellow = draw; Red = away team win.

== Relegation Round ==
=== League table ===
Pos	Team	Pld	W	D	L	GF	GA	GD	Pts	Relegation
1	SalPa	27	8	7	12	37	35	+2	31	
2	JäPS	27	8	7	12	35	41	−6	31	
3	Jaro	27	7	10	10	33	42	−9	31	
4	KäPa (Note: KäPa were reprieved from relegation after HIFK dissolved due to bankruptcy.)	27	7	6	14	44	53	−9	27	
5	KPV (R)	27	4	9	14	27	45	−18	21	Relegation to the 2024 Ykkönen
6	JJK (R)	27	3	7	17	25	52	−27	16	Relegation to the 2024 Ykkönen

Source: Soccerway
Rules for classification: 1) Points; 2) Goal difference; 3) Goals scored; 4) Head-to-head points; 5) Head-to-head goal difference; 6) Head-to-head away goals scored; 7) Play-off
(Note: Play-off is only played if need to decide champion, teams for relegation or UEFA competition and will be played on a neutral ground).
(R) Relegated

=== Results ===
Home \ Away	JÁP	JAR	JJK	KÁP	KPV	SAI
JäPS	—	0–0	—	2–1	5–1	—
Jaro	—	—	—	1–4	3–1	3–1
JJK	1–0	1–4	—	—	—	—
KäPa	—	—	1–0	—	—	1–1
KPV	—	—	3–1	2–0	—	—
SalPa	1–2	—	2–2	—	2–0	—

Legend: Blue = home team win; Yellow = draw; Red = away team win.

== Attendances ==
#	Club	Average
1	TPS	1,847
2	HIFK	1,656
3	MP	1,108
4	Jaro	1,106
5	JJK	952
6	EIF	932
7	KPV	884
8	SJK Akatemia	851
9	Gnistan	814
10	SalPa	606
11	JäPS	516
12	KäPa	416
