= Ykkösliiga =

- Founded: 2022
- First season: 2024
- Country: Finland
- Confederation: UEFA
- Number of clubs: 10
- Level on pyramid: 2
- Promotion to: Veikkausliiga (1–2 depending on the promotion play-offs)
- Relegation to: Ykkönen (1–2 depending on the relegation play-offs)
- Domestic cup: Finnish Cup
- League cup: Ykkösliigacup
- Current champions: FC Lahti (2025)
- Most championships: KTP, FC Lahti (1)
- Top scorer: Salomo Ojala (19)
- Broadcaster: Ruutu+
- Website: Ykkösliiga
- Current: 2026 Ykkösliiga

Ykkösliiga (English: "League One"; Swedish: "Ligaettan") is the second highest level of the Finnish football league system (after the Veikkausliiga), managed by the Football Association of Finland. The teams in Ykkösliiga also play a pre-season league cup, the Ykkösliigacup.

The nationwide second-tier league was first established in 1973 as I divisioona. It was later renamed Ykkönen, starting in 1994. The new and current Ykkösliiga started running in 2024, and the former second-tier Ykkönen continues as the new third-tier level.

== History ==
The first league format competition in the second level of Finnish football was called Suomensarja, which was founded in 1936. Before the inauguration of the Suomensarja, from 1930 to 1935, there had been special qualification matches for the right to play in the Mestaruussarja.

In the autumn of 1969, the Finnish football underwent a league system reform, and the Suomensarja was renamed II divisioona, or 2nd Division, with regional sections.

In 1973, this level of football in Finland became nationwide, and the new name was 1. divisioona (First Division). The name Ykkönen was used since 1995.

== Creation of Ykkösliiga ==
In July 2022, Finnish sports media Elmo reported that the Finnish FA is planning to create a new second-tier football league. It was also reported that it is expected be a five-year long period, after which the top-tier Veikkausliiga could be expanded to consist 16 teams, but this claim has not been confirmed.

In the late August 2022, Finnish FA announced the creation of a new nationwide league, contested with 10 teams, planned to be located between current Ykkönen and Kakkonen. Later in October it was confirmed that the new second-tier league would be named Ykkösliiga, and the FA simultaneously announced the specific rules on how the new level is formed and which clubs would gain the position in it. The nine best teams of 2023 Ykkönen would automatically qualify for the 2024 Ykkösliiga. Each group winner of the three groups in 2023 Kakkonen and the best runner-up, would play the 2024 Ykkösliiga play-offs. The winner of these qualifiers wins the last spot, and the three other clubs earn a position to the new third-tier 2024 Ykkönen.

The new league was scheduled to start running in 2024. Ykkösliiga would replace Ykkönen as the second-highest Finnish football league, and the current second-tier Ykkönen would drop down one level in a league pyramid to establish a new and the first nationwide third-tier Ykkönen with 12 teams, starting to run in 2024. All the previous third-tier levels in Finland had been divided to geographical groups based on locations of the clubs.

As a conclusion, all the lower levels in Finland would drop down one level in the league pyramid (Kakkonen forms a new fourth-tier, Kolmonen a new fifth-tier etc.).

The inaugural season 2024 Ykkösliiga started on 13 April 2024.

== Structure ==
Like the first-tier Veikkausliiga, Ykkösliiga is a summer league, played usually from the start of April to October. All the competing teams play 27 matches, facing each other three times in total. After the matchday 18 follows the final phase where every team face each other once. The top-5 teams earn five home matches for the last nine matches, and the bottom-5 have four home matches. The winner of Ykkösliiga wins automatically a promotion to Veikkausliiga, and the second-placed team plays a two-legged promotion play-offs against 11th placed team in Veikkausliiga. The last placed team is relegated to new third-tier Ykkönen, while the 9th placed team plays the relegation play-offs against Ykkönen runners-up.

=== Reserve teams ===
The reserve teams of Veikkausliiga clubs are permitted to compete in Ykkösliiga. However, they are prohibited to promote from Ykkösliiga to Veikkausliiga.

== Clubs in 2027 season ==

The clubs in the 2027 Ykkösliiga season, the fourth campaign of Ykkösliiga, are:

Club	Location	Stadium	Capacity	Manager
Ekenäs IF	Ekenäs	Ekenäs Centrumplan	1,400	(Finland) Christian Sund
Jippo	Joensuu	Mehtimäki	1,000	(Finland) Mikko Hallikainen
JäPS	Järvenpää	Järvenpään keskuskenttä	2,000	(Finland) Teemu Kankkunen
Klubi 04	Helsinki	Bolt Arena	10,770	(Finland) Aleksi Lalli
RoPS	Rovaniemi	Keskuskenttä	2,803	Diogo Pinto
Haka	Valkeakoski	Tehtaan Kenttä	3,516	(Finland) Tommi Ekmark
PK-35	Helsinki	Mustapekka Areena	2,200	(Portugal) Tiago Santos
MP	Mikkeli	Mikkelin Urheilupuisto	7,000	(Brazil) Ozeias Graciano
TamU	Tampere	Kaupin Jalkapallostadion	1,000	(Finland) Topi Priha
IFK Mariehamn	Mariehamn	Wiklöf Holding Arena	1,635	(Sweden) Björknesjö Roberth

== Champions and top scorers 2024– ==
Champions and top scorers of former second-tier Ykkönen 1973–2023

Season	Champion	League promotions	Top scorer	Club	Goals
2024	KTP	KTP, Jaro	(Finland) Aleksi Tarvonen	KTP	15
2025	FC Lahti	FC Lahti, TPS	(Finland) Salomo Ojala	Ekenäs IF	19
2026	KTP	KTP	(Finland) Petteri Forsell (Finland) Eino-Iivari Pitkälä	KTP; PK-35	11

== Referees ==
For the 2024 season, the referee committee of Finnish FA has listed 14 referees primarily available for Ykkösliiga matches (Category 2). Additionally, there are also 23 named assistant referees available. The referees named in the Category 1 (primarily for top-tiers Veikkausliiga and Kansallinen Liiga) are also available for Ykkösliiga.
