= List of Finnish football transfers winter 2023–24 =

This is a list of Finnish football transfers for the 2023–24 winter transfer window. Only transfers featuring Veikkausliiga are listed.

== Veikkausliiga ==
Note: Flags indicate national team as has been defined under FIFA eligibility rules. Players may hold more than one non-FIFA nationality.

=== Ekenäs IF ===
In:

No.	Pos.	Nation	Player
—	GK	GRE	Nikos Giannakopoulos (from (Israel) Hapoel Petah Tikva F.C.)
—	DF	Kosovo	Arian Kabashi (from (Finland) FC Lahti)
—	MF	FRA	Abdoulaye Kanté (on loan from (Finland) Ilves)
—	DF	FIN	Kalle Katz (from (Finland) Ilves)
—	DF	FIN	Henri Malundama (from (Finland) FC Haka)
—	DF	GHA	Nasiru Mohammed (from (Sweden) FC Trollhättan )
—	MF	FIN	Emil Pallas (from (Finland) HIFK)
—	MF	FIN	Eetu Puro (from (Finland) HIFK)
—	DF	FIN	Väinö Vehkonen (from (Finland) Mikkelin Palloilijat)

Out:

No.	Pos.	Nation	Player
—	DF	FIN	Linus Estlander (to (Finland) Grankulla IFK)
—	MF	FIN	Oliver Estlander (to (Finland) Grankulla IFK)
—	DF	CMR	Jeannot Esua (to (Republic of Ireland) Galway United F.C.)
—	MF	FRA	Abdoulaye Kanté (to (Finland) Ilves)
—	GK	POR	Gerson Lima (to (Finland) Ekenäs IF II)
—	DF	CMR	Tabi Manga (to (Finland) KTP Kotka)
—	MF	FIN	Jakob Metzner (free agent)
—	MF	FIN	Selim Snabb (to (Finland) Ekenäs IF II)
—	MF	FIN	Hiski Sundholm (to (Finland) Ekenäs IF II)
—	DF	FIN	Castor Westerholm (to (Finland) Ekenäs IF II)

=== IF Gnistan ===
In:

No.	Pos.	Nation	Player
—	MF	GHA	David Agbo (from (Finland) Inter Turku)
—	MF	POR	Tomás Castro (from (Portugal) B-SAD)
—	FW	NOR	Jonas Enkerud (from (Norway) HamKam)
—	MF	FIN	Roman Eremenko (from (Finland) FC Honka)
—	MF	FIN	Gabriel Europaeus (from (Finland) Honka Akatemia)
—	MF	FIN	Saku Heiskanen (from (United States) UCF Knights)
—	MF	FIN	Vertti Hänninen (from (Finland) SJK Seinäjoki, previously on loan at (Lithuania) FC Džiugas Telšiai)
—	MF	FIN	Keaton Isaksson (from (Greece) Kozani F.C.)
—	MF	FIN	Armend Kabashi (free agent)
—	MF	FIN	Pauli Katajamäki (from (Finland) FC Honka)
—	GK	SWE	Mathias Nilsson (loan from (Sweden) Malmö FF)
—	DF	FIN	Juhani Ojala (from (Finland) FC Honka)
—	DF	FIN	Teemu Penninkangas (from (Finland) FC Lahti)
—	MF	FIN	Roope Pyyskänen (from (Finland) FC Honka)
—	DF	FIN	Jukka Raitala (from (Finland) HJK Helsinki)
—	FW	BIH	Benjamin Tatar (from (Kazakhstan) FC Okzhetpes)
—	FW	FIN	Kristian Yli-Hietanen (from (Finland) Käpylän Pallo)
—	DF	FIN	Elias Äijälä (from (Finland) FC Honka)

Out:

No.	Pos.	Nation	Player
—	DF	FIN	Tuukka Andberg (to (Finland) PK-35)
—	MF	FIN	Keaton Isaksson (free agent)
—	MF	FIN	Topi Järvinen (to (Finland) EPS)
—	FW	FIN	Eero Markkanen (to (Finland) PK-35)
—	MF	SLE	Medo Kamara (to (Finland) HJS Akatemia)
—	MF	FIN	Kauri Koivunen (to (Finland) VJS)
—	GK	FIN	Otso Linnas (to (Finland) Jippo)
—	DF	FIN	Matias Paavola (loan return to (Finland) KTP Kotka)
—	DF	FIN	Konsta Rasimus (free agent)
—	MF	CAN	Zachary Sukunda (to (Canada) Valour FC)
—	DF	FIN	Aaro Tiihonen (loan return to (Finland) AC Oulu)
—	MF	FIN	Maximo Tolonen (to (Finland) Käpylän Pallo)
—	FW	FIN	Luca Weckström (to (Finland) KTP Kotka)

=== FC Haka ===
In:

No.	Pos.	Nation	Player
—	FW	SRB	Marko Bačanin (from (Serbia) FK Železničar Pančevo)
—	DF	BRA	Nicolas Gianini Dantas (from (Sweden) Oskarshamns AIK)
—	GK	FIN	Oliver Heino (from (Finland) Haka U19)
—	GK	NIR	Liam Hughes (free agent)
—	MF	FIN	Juho Kilo (from (Germany) Hamburger SV II)
—	MF	FIN	Oiva Laaksonen (loan return from (Finland) SexyPöxyt)
—	FW	ENG	Imani Lanquedoc (loan from (England) Fulham U21)
—	DF	POR	Rodrigo Macedo (from (Slovakia) FK Dubnica)
—	MF	POR	Guilherme Morais (from (Spain) Real Murcia CF)
—	DF	CMR	Hassan Ndam (from (United States) New York Red Bulls)
—	MF	BEL	Evangelos Patoulidis (from (Belgium) K.V. Oostende, previously on loan at (Netherlands) Den Bosch)
—	MF	Kosovo	Arlind Sejdiu (from (Finland) Inter Turku)
—	DF	FIN	Nikolas Talo (from (Finland) KTP Kotka)
—	MF	FIN	Tuukka Törmä (from (Finland) Haka U19)

Out:

No.	Pos.	Nation	Player
—	FW	MEX	Alberto Alvarado (to (Costa Rica) Municipal Grecia)
—	DF	FIN	Eero-Matti Auvinen (to (Finland) IFK Mariehamn)
—	MF	ALG	Mehdi Boukassi (loan return to (Morocco) Raja CA)
—	GK	FIN	Aatu Hakala (to (Finland) KuPS)
—	DF	TRI	Anthony Herbert (to (United States) New Mexico United)
—	GK	FIN	Felix Lehtinen (to (Malta) Gudja United F.C.)
—	FW	ARG	Juan Lescano (to (China) Chongqing Tonglianglong F.C.)
—	DF	FIN	Henri Malundama (to (Finland) Ekenäs IF)
—	MF	FIN	Konsta Mervelä (to (Finland) FC Jazz, previously on loan at Ilves-Kissat)
—	DF	FRA	Hayk Musakhanyan (to (Armenia) FC Alashkert)
—	DF	SEN	Fallou Ndiaye (to (Finland) SJK Seinäjoki)
—	MF	FIN	Tino Purme (to (Finland) Ylöjärvi United)
—	FW	NZL	Logan Rogerson (to (Armenia) FC Noah)
—	DF	FIN	Thomas Saarinen (to (Finland) SexyPöxyt, previously on loan at SexyPöxyt)
—	DF	FIN	Atte Sihvonen (to (Finland) TPS)
—	FW	GRE	Stavros Zarokostas (to (Greece) Egaleo F.C.)

=== HJK Helsinki ===
In:

No.	Pos.	Nation	Player
—	FW	FIN	Samuel Anini Junior (loan return from (Finland) IFK Mariehamn)
—	DF	FIN	Michael Boamah (from (Finland) HJK Klubi 04)
—	GK	FIN	Elmo Henriksson (loan return from (Finland) IFK Mariehamn)
—	MF	FIN	Niilo Kujasalo (from (Finland) HJK Klubi 04)
—	MF	FIN	Lucas Lingman (from (Sweden) Helsingborgs IF, previously on loan at HJK Helsinki)
—	DF	ENG	Brooklyn Lyons-Foster (from (England) Tottenham Hotspur U23)
—	DF	Spain	Carlos Moros Gracia (from (Sweden) Djurgårdens IF)
—	MF	FIN	Liam Möller (from (Finland) HJK Klubi 04)
—	DF	FIN	Noah Pallas (from (Finland) AC Oulu)
—	FW	ENG	Luke Plange (loan from (England) Crystal Palace)
—	MF	GHA	Hans Nunoo Sarpei (free agent)
—	DF	FIN	Aaro Soiniemi (from (Finland) Käpylän Pallo)
—	MF	FIN	Aaro Toivonen (from (Finland) HJK Klubi 04)
—	DF	FIN	Diogo Tomas (from (Norway) Odds BK)
—	DF	EST	Andreas Vaher (from (Germany) SC Freiburg II)
—	MF	FIN	Johannes Yli-Kokko (loan return from (Republic of Ireland) Dundalk F.C.)
—	DF	FIN	Miska Ylitolva (loan return from (Finland) KTP Kotka)

Out:

No.	Pos.	Nation	Player
—	GK	TUR	Halil Bağci (to (Turkey) Gaziantep F.K., previously on loan at Salon Palloilijat)
—	DF	SWE	Kristopher Da Graca (loan return to (Sweden) IK Sirius)
—	MF	FIN	Përparim Hetemaj (retired)
—	DF	FIN	Niko Hämäläinen (free agent)
—	GK	MKD	Dejan Iliev (to (Bosnia and Herzegovina) FK Sarajevo)
—	DF	FIN	Valtteri Moren (retired)
—	GK	FIN	Niki Mäenpää (free agent)
—	DF	FIN	Tuomas Ollila (to (France) Paris FC)
—	MF	FIN	Aleksi Paananen (to (Finland) AC Oulu)
—	DF	FIN	Matti Peltola (to (United States) D.C. United)
—	FW	SRB	Bojan Radulović (to (England) Huddersfield Town A.F.C.)
—	DF	FIN	Jukka Raitala (to (Finland) IF Gnistan)
—	DF	FIN	Patrik Raitanen (to (Finland) IFK Mariehamn, previously on loan at IFK Mariehamn)
—	FW	FIN	Roope Riski (to (Finland) Ilves)
—	MF	SWE	Filip Rogić (to (Serbia) IMT Beograd)
—	DF	FIN	Aaro Soiniemi (loan to (Finland) TPS)
—	DF	FIN	Pyry Soiri (to (Romania) CS Universitatea Craiova)
—	MF	FIN	Maksim Stjopin (loan return to (Denmark) FC Nordsjælland)
—	DF	FIN	Miro Tenho (to (Sweden) Djurgårdens IF)

=== Ilves ===
In:

No.	Pos.	Nation	Player
—	FW	FIN	Danila Bulgakov (from (Finland) AC Oulu)
—	MF	FRA	Abdoulaye Kanté (from (Finland) Ekenäs IF)
—	DF	FIN	Matias Kivikko Arraño (from (Finland) TPS)
—	DF	FIN	Juhani Pikkarainen (from (Finland) VPS)
—	MF	FIN	Anton Popovitch (from (Finland) KuPS)
—	FW	FIN	Roope Riski (from (Finland) HJK Helsinki)
—	MF	FIN	Maksim Stjopin (from (Denmark) FC Nordsjælland, previously on loan at HJK Helsinki)
—	MF	FIN	Arttu Tulehmo (from (Finland) Ilves II)
—	FW	FIN	Vincent Ulundu (from (Finland) FC Honka)
—	MF	FIN	Joona Veteli (from (Finland) KuPS)
—	GK	FIN	Lucas Väyrynen (from (Finland) Ilves II)

Out:

No.	Pos.	Nation	Player
—	FW	FIN	Badreddine Bushara (to (Finland) KPV Kokkola, previously on loan at (Finland) JäPS)
—	MF	FRA	Abdoulaye Kanté (loan to (Finland) Ekenäs IF)
—	DF	FIN	Kalle Katz (to (Finland) Ekenäs IF)
—	DF	FIN	Leo Kyllönen (to (Finland) KTP Kotka)
—	MF	NIG	Yussif Moussa (to (Iraq) Al-Talaba SC)
—	MF	NIG	Seydine N'Diaye (to (Thailand) BG Pathum United)
—	FW	AUS	Sabit James Ngor (to (Australia) Heidelberg United FC)
—	FW	BER	Djair Parfitt-Williams (to (Greece) Makedonikos F.C.)
—	MF	FIN	Emmanuel Patut (to (Finland) IFK Mariehamn)
—	FW	MLI	Méry Traoré (loan return to (Mali) FC Diarra)

=== FC Inter Turku ===
In:

No.	Pos.	Nation	Player
—	FW	BFA	Kouamé Botué (from (France) AC Ajaccio)
—	DF	FIN	Albin Granlund (from (Finland) IFK Mariehamn)
—	MF	NED	Kevin Jansen (from (Finland) FC Honka)
—	MF	FIN	Joonas Kekarainen (from (Finland) Käpylän Pallo)
—	MF	GER	Florian Krebs (from (Finland) FC Honka)
—	MF	FIN	Thomas Lahdensuo (from (Finland) Käpylän Pallo)
—	FW	FIN	Djoully Nzoko (from (Finland) Inter Turku U19)
—	DF	Spain	Derik Osede (from (Republic of Ireland) Waterford F.C.)
—	GK	FIN	Ville Seppä (from (Finland) KPV Kokkola)
—	GK	FIN	Eero Vuorjoki (from (Finland) Honka U19)

Out:

No.	Pos.	Nation	Player
—	MF	GHA	David Agbo (to (Finland) IF Gnistan)
—	DF	ARG	Rodrigo Arciero (to (Argentina) Deportivo Morón)
—	DF	NZL	Nikko Boxall (to (Australia) Eastern Suburbs FC)
—	FW	MLI	Boubou Diallo (loan return to (Belgium) SL16 FC)
—	MF	FIN	Petteri Forsell (to (Poland) Korona Kielce)
—	DF	FIN	Juho Hyvärinen (to (Finland) VPS)
—	MF	FIN	Tommi Jyry (to (Romania) FC Petrolul Ploiești)
—	FW	FIN	Olli Jakonen (to (Finland) Salon Palloilijat, previously on loan at Salon Palloilijat)
—	DF	FIN	Noah Nurmi (to (Finland) IFK Mariehamn)
—	MF	FIN	Matias Ojala (to (Finland) IFK Mariehamn)
—	GK	FIN	Matias Riikonen (to (Finland) IFK Mariehamn)
—	MF	Kosovo	Arlind Sejdiu (to (Finland) FC Haka)
—	GK	FIN	Walter Viitala (retired)

=== KuPS ===
In:

No.	Pos.	Nation	Player
—	DF	SWE	Kristopher Da Graca (loan from (Sweden) IK Sirius)
—	GK	FIN	Aatu Hakala (from (Finland) FC Haka)
—	DF	FIN	Tatu Hukkanen (from (Finland) KuPS Akatemia)
—	DF	FIN	Samu Koistinen (from (Finland) KuPS Akatemia)
—	FW	FIN	Joslyn Luyeye-Lutumba (from (Finland) MP)
—	FW	NGA	Mohammed Muritala (loan from (Nigeria) TikiTaka)
—	FW	FIN	Jonathan Muzinga (from (Finland) FC Honka)
—	FW	NGA	Paul Ogunkoya (loan from (Nigeria) Mahanaim)
—	MF	FIN	Petteri Pennanen (from (India) Hyderabad FC)
—	MF	FIN	Otto Ruoppi (loan return from (Finland) MP)
—	MF	FIN	Lauri Sahimaa (loan return from (Finland) MP)
—	MF	FIN	Jerry Voutilainen (from (Finland) FC Honka)

Out:

No.	Pos.	Nation	Player
—	MF	BRA	Gabriel Bispo (to (Brazil) Paysandu)
—	MF	FIN	Sebastian Dahlström (to (Finland) IFK Mariehamn)
—	MF	BRA	Éliton Júnior (loan return to (Sweden) Varbergs BoIS)
—	FW	ENG	Jake Jervis (to (England) Brackley Town F.C.)
—	DF	FIN	Tony Miettinen (to (Norway) Odds BK)
—	MF	FIN	Anton Popovitch (to (Finland) Ilves)
—	GK	FIN	Hemmo Riihimäki (to (Finland) SJK Seinäjoki)
—	DF	KEN	Collins Sichenje (loan return to (Sweden) AIK)
—	DF	FIN	Henri Toivomäki (retired)
—	FW	FIN	Jasse Tuominen (to (Poland) Bruk-Bet Termalica Nieciecza)
—	MF	FIN	Joona Veteli (to (Finland) Ilves)
—	MF	FIN	Onni Viljamaa (free agent, previously on loan at (Finland) Käpylän Pallo)
—	FW	AUS	Tete Yengi (loan return to (England) Ipswich Town F.C.)

=== FC Lahti ===
In:

No.	Pos.	Nation	Player
—	FW	FIN	Asaad Babiker (from (Finland) Reipas Lahti)
—	DF	AUS	Dylan Fox (from (India) Jamshedpur FC)
—	DF	FIN	Topias Inkinen (from (Finland) Reipas Lahti)
—	FW	AUS	Luke Ivanovic (from (Australia) Perth Glory FC)
—	MF	FIN	Otso Koskinen (from (Finland) FC Honka)
—	FW	ARG	Michael López (from (Finland) FC Honka)
—	FW	NED	Colin Odutayo (from (Lithuania) FK Riteriai)
—	GK	ENG	Josh Oluwayemi (from (England) Portsmouth F.C.)
—	DF	FIN	Riku Selander (from (Finland) AC Oulu)
—	DF	FIN	Matias Vainionpää (from (Finland) SJK Seinäjoki)
—	DF	FIN	Mikko Viitikko (loan from (Sweden) Trelleborgs FF)

Out:

No.	Pos.	Nation	Player
—	FW	Sudan	Jusif Ali (free agent)
—	FW	BRA	Matheus Alves (free agent)
—	FW	FIN	Onni Hänninen (to (Finland) SJK Akatemia)
—	DF	FIN	Lassi Järvenpää (to (Finland) Reipas Lahti)
—	DF	Kosovo	Arian Kabashi (to (Finland) Ekenäs IF)
—	MF	CRO	Leon Kreković (to (Poland) Kotwica Kołobrzeg)
—	DF	FIN	Mikko Kuningas (free agent)
—	DF	FIN	Eemil Laamanen (loan to (Finland) JäPS)
—	GK	CRO	Marin Ljubić (to (Uzbekistan) FC Bunyodkor)
—	MF	GER	Anouar El Moukhantir (to (Austria) Admira Wacker)
—	DF	FIN	Teemu Penninkangas (to (Finland) IF Gnistan)
—	DF	FIN	Juho Pirttijoki (career break)
—	FW	FIN	Irfan Sadik (to (Finland) JäPS)
—	DF	CRO	Luka Šimunović (to (Slovenia) NK Triglav Kranj)

=== IFK Mariehamn ===
In:

No.	Pos.	Nation	Player
—	DF	FIN	Eero-Matti Auvinen (from (Finland) FC Haka)
—	MF	CPV	Hugo Cardoso (from (Portugal) S.U. 1º Dezembro)
—	MF	FIN	Sebastian Dahlström (from (Finland) KuPS)
—	FW	SWE	Adam Larsson (from (Sweden) AFC Eskilstuna)
—	FW	FIN	Arvid Lundberg (loan return from (Cyprus) Pafos FC U19)
—	DF	POR	Pedro Machado (from (Portugal) Vitória Setúbal)
—	FW	FIN	Wille Nuñez (from (Finland) IFK Mariehamn U19)
—	MF	FIN	Noah Nurmi (from (Finland) Inter Turku)
—	MF	FIN	Matias Ojala (from (Finland) Inter Turku)
—	DF	NGA	Emmanuel Okereke (unknown)
—	GK	FIN	Aleksi Partanen (from (Finland) HJK Klubi 04)
—	MF	FIN	Emmanuel Patut (from (Finland) Ilves)
—	MF	ENG	Jayden Reid (from (England) Portsmouth F.C.)
—	GK	FIN	Matias Riikonen (from (Finland) Inter Turku)

Out:

No.	Pos.	Nation	Player
—	FW	FIN	Samuel Anini Junior (loan return to (Finland) HJK Helsinki)
—	DF	FRA	Jean-Christophe Coubronne (retired)
—	FW	BRA	Dé (loan to (Ukraine) FC Oleksandriya)
—	DF	FIN	Albin Granlund (to (Finland) Inter Turku)
—	GK	FIN	Otto Hautamo (to (Finland) Käpylän Pallo)
—	GK	FIN	Elmo Henriksson (loan return to (Finland) HJK Helsinki)
—	DF	BRA	Alan Henrique (free agent)
—	MF	NED	Jelle van der Heyden (to (Faroe Islands) B36 Tórshavn)
—	MF	ENG	Jamie Hopcutt (to (Sweden) Östersunds FK)
—	FW	GRE	Konstantinos Kotsopoulos (to (Greece) Kalamata F.C.)
—	DF	FIN	Timi Lahti (retired)
—	MF	FRA	Aly Ndom (to (Canada) Pacific FC)
—	MF	CMR	Alvaro Ngamba (loan return to (Ukraine) FC Kolos Kovalivka)
—	FW	CMR	Ariel Ngueukam (to (Philippines) United City FC)
—	DF	FIN	Patrik Raitanen (from (Finland) HJK Helsinki, previously on loan at IFK Mariehamn)
—	DF	FIN	Mikko Sumusalo (to (Finland) KTP Kotka)

=== AC Oulu ===
In:

No.	Pos.	Nation	Player
—	DF	NOR	Liiban Abadid (loan from (Sweden) IF Brommapojkarna)
—	FW	BRA	Marcos André (loan from (Brazil) Retrô)
—	MF	NIR	Jake Dunwoody (from (Finland) SJK Seinäjoki)
—	DF	EQG	José Elo (from (Spain) Mérida AD)
—	MF	FIN	Daniel Heikkinen (loan return from (Finland) Käpylän Pallo)
—	FW	FIN	Jesse Huhtala (from (Finland) Salon Palloilijat)
—	DF	FIN	Samuli Hölttä (from (Finland) Mikkelin Palloilijat)
—	FW	FIN	Rene Kähkönen (from (Finland) OLS Oulu)
—	FW	FIN	Julius Körkkö (from (Finland) JS Hercules)
—	DF	FIN	Juho Lehtiranta (from (Finland) KTP)
—	MF	GRE	Dimitrios Metaxas (from (Greece) Volos)
—	DF	FIN	Niklas Orjala (from (Finland) Mikkelin Palloilijat)
—	MF	FIN	Aleksi Paananen (from (Finland) HJK Helsinki)
—	MF	FIN	Julius Paananen (from (Finland) OLS Oulu)
—	DF	FIN	Otso-Pekka Parkkila (from (Finland) OLS U19)
—	MF	FIN	Asla Peltola (from (Finland) Honka Akatemia)
—	GK	FIN	Johannes Pentti (from (Finland) OLS U19)
—	FW	USA	Justin Rennicks (from (United States) New England Revolution)
—	DF	FIN	Eetu Saarela (from (Finland) OLS U19)
—	FW	FIN	Otto Salmensuu (from (Finland) Salon Palloilijat, previously on loan at Pallo-Iirot)
—	MF	FIN	Roope Salo (from (Finland) JJK Jyväskylä)

Out:

No.	Pos.	Nation	Player
—	DF	CIV	Yann Emmanuel Affi (to (Belarus) BATE Borisov)
—	MF	Switzerland	Magnus Breitenmoser (free agent)
—	DF	FIN	Elias Collin (to (Finland) TPS)
—	DF	FRA	Hamed Dramé (to (Cyprus) Olympiakos Nicosia)
—	FW	FIN	Rony Huhtala (retired)
—	MF	FIN	Lasse Ikonen (to (Finland) TPS)
—	FW	FIN	Rasmus Karjalainen (to (Finland) SJK Seinäjoki)
—	DF	FIN	Nestori Kekonen (to (Finland) OLS Oulu)
—	MF	BRA	Luquinhas (to (Brazil) Amazonas Futebol Clube)
—	DF	FIN	Noah Pallas (to (Finland) HJK Helsinki)
—	GK	FIN	Juhani Pennanen (free agent)
—	FW	FIN	Eemeli Raittinen (to (Finland) OLS Oulu)
—	FW	FIN	Onni Suutari (loan to (Estonia) Tallinna Kalev)
—	DF	FIN	Riku Selander (to (Finland) FC Lahti)
—	MF	FIN	Maximus Tainio (to (Finland) Salon Palloilijat)
—	DF	FIN	Aaro Tiihonen (to (Finland) RoPS, previously on loan at IF Gnistan)
—	DF	COL	Cristian Valencia (to (Finland) VPS)

=== SJK Seinäjoki ===
In:

No.	Pos.	Nation	Player
—	DF	CIV	Ibrahim Cissé (from (Finland) SJK Akatemia)
—	MF	FIN	Denis Cukici (from (Finland) SJK Akatemia)
—	DF	POR	Babacar Fati (from (Finland) SJK Akatemia)
—	MF	FIN	Oliver Günes (from (Finland) SJK Akatemia)
—	FW	FIN	Rasmus Karjalainen (from (Finland) AC Oulu)
—	MF	FIN	Lauri Laine (from (Finland) FC Honka)
—	MF	FIN	Eetu Mömmö (loan from (Italy) US Lecce)
—	DF	FIN	Dario Naamo (from (Finland) FC Honka)
—	DF	SEN	Fallou Ndiaye (from (Finland) FC Haka)
—	FW	FIN	Kasper Paananen (from (Finland) SJK Akatemia)
—	GK	FIN	Roope Paunio (from (Finland) FC Honka)
—	DF	CPV	Kelvin Pires (loan from (Slovakia) AS Trenčín)
—	GK	FIN	Hemmo Riihimäki (from (Finland) SJK Seinäjoki)
—	GK	Nicaragua	Miguel Rodríguez (from (Finland) SJK Akatemia)
—	DF	FIN	Oskari Väistö (from (Finland) SJK Akatemia)
—	MF	GHA	Salim Yussif (from (Ghana) Vision FC)

Out:

No.	Pos.	Nation	Player
—	MF	NIR	Jake Dunwoody (to (Finland) AC Oulu)
—	FW	NGA	Samson Ebuka Obioha (to (Kosovo) FC Drita)
—	DF	FIN	Martti Haukioja (to (Finland) VPS)
—	DF	FIN	Matej Hradecky (to (Slovakia) MFK Skalica)
—	GK	FIN	Otto Huuhtanen (free agent)
—	MF	FIN	Vertti Hänninen (to (Finland) IF Gnistan, previously on loan at (Lithuania) FC Džiugas Telšiai)
—	MF	MAS	Nooa Laine (loan to (Malaysia) Selangor F.C.)
—	DF	BRA	Murilo (to (Malaysia) Johor Darul Ta'zim F.C.)
—	MF	CHI	Diego Rojas (to (Chile) Curicó Unido)
—	FW	FIN	Jeremiah Streng (to (Italy) Ascoli)
—	GK	FIN	Markus Uusitalo (retired)
—	DF	FIN	Matias Vainionpää (to (Finland) FC Lahti)
—	DF	GHA	Terry Yegbe (to (Sweden) IF Elfsborg)
—	GK	Latvia	Krišjānis Zviedris (to (Latvia) FK Auda)

=== VPS ===
In:

No.	Pos.	Nation	Player
—	MF	FIN	Antonio Almen (loan return from (Finland) Vasa IFK)
—	FW	DEN	Mads Borchers (from (Sweden) Varbergs BoIS)
—	DF	ENG	Alfie Cicale (free agent)
—	DF	FIN	Madut Deng (from (Finland) VPS U19)
—	MF	NGA	Peter Eletu (free agent)
—	DF	FIN	Martti Haukioja (from (Finland) SJK Seinäjoki)
—	FW	FIN	Teemu Hytönen (loan return from (Finland) Närpes Kraft)
—	DF	FIN	Juho Hyvärinen (from (Finland) Inter Turku)
—	DF	GNB	Pedro Justiniano (from (Poland) Radomiak Radom, previously on loan at (Romania) FC Petrolul Ploiești)
—	GK	FIN	Rasmus Leislahti (from (Finland) KTP Kotka)
—	DF	COL	Cristian Valencia (from (Finland) AC Oulu)
—	FW	SUR	Gleofilo Vlijter (from (Cyprus) Doxa Katokopias F.C.)

Out:

No.	Pos.	Nation	Player
—	MF	FIN	Justus Lehto (to (Finland) FC Jazz)
—	DF	GHA	Baba Mensah (to (Finland) TPS)
—	FW	NGA	Peter Michael (to (Romania) CFR Cluj)
—	FW	JAM	Steven Morrissey (to (Finland) Vasa IFK)
—	DF	FIN	Juhani Pikkarainen (to (Finland) Ilves)
—	DF	ENG	Tyler Reid (to (Moldova) FC Sheriff Tiraspol)
—	MF	BRA	Sávio Roberto (to (Iran) Esteghlal Khuzestan F.C.)
—	FW	AUS	Harry Sawyer (to (Australia) South Melbourne FC)
—	DF	FIN	Gabriel Sillanpää (free agent)
—	MF	FIN	Sebastian Strandvall (retired)
—	DF	COL	Cristian Valencia (to (Colombia) Llaneros F.C.)
—	GK	CAN	Jonathan Viscosi (to (Canada) Valour FC)

== See also ==
- 2024 Veikkausliiga
- 2023 Veikkausliiga
