= Onni =

Onni is a male name of Finnish origin meaning "happiness, luck." It was the sixth most popular name for boys in Finland in 2007.

== People with the given name Onni ==
- Onni Happonen, Finnish politician and murder victim
- Onni Hiltunen, Finnish politician
- Onni Hänninen, Finnish footballer
- Onni Kasslin, Finnish cyclist
- Onni Lappalainen, Finnish gymnast
- Onni Okkonen, Finnish art historian
- Onni Palaste, Finnish writer
- Onni Pellinen, Finnish wrestler
- Onni Schildt, Finnish politician
- Onni Suutari, Finnish footballer
- Onni Rajasaari, Finnish athlete
- Onni Talas, Finnish politician
- Onni Tiihonen, Finnish footballer
- Onni Tommila, Finnish child actor
- Onni Valakari, Finnish footballer
- Onni Viljamaa, Finnish footballer
