= Topias Inkinen =

Finnish footballer (born 2003)

Personal information
- Date of birth: 26 June 2003 (age 23)
- Place of birth: Finland
- Height: 1.88 m (6 ft 2 in)
- Position: Centre back

Team information
- Current team: Lahti
- Number: 25

Youth career
- –2016: Kuusysi
- 2016–2019: Reipas Lahti
- 2019–2021: Lahti

Senior career*
Years	Team	Apps	(Gls)
2021–2026	Reipas Lahti	48	(2)
2024–	Lahti	32	(1)
- * Club domestic league appearances and goals as of 13 November 2026

Topias Inkinen (born 26 June 2003) is a Finnish professional footballer who plays as a centre back for Veikkausliiga club Lahti.

== Career statistics ==
As of 13 November 2026

Appearances and goals by club, season and competition
Club	Season	League			National cup (Note: Includes Suomen Cup)		League cup (Note: Includes Finnish League Cup and Ykkösliigacup)		Europe		Total	
Club	Season	Division	Apps	Goals	Apps	Goals	Apps	Goals	Apps	Goals	Apps	Goals
Reipas Lahti	2021	Kakkonen	4	0	–		–		–		4	0
Reipas Lahti	2022	Kakkonen	19	0	1	0	–		–		20	0
Reipas Lahti	2023	Kakkonen	19	2	1	0	–		–		20	2
Reipas Lahti	2024	Kakkonen	4	0	–		–		–		4	0
Reipas Lahti	2026	Kakkonen	2	0	–		–		–		2	0
Total		48	2	2	0	0	0	0	0	50	2	
Lahti	2024	Veikkausliiga	5	0	1	0	5	0	–		11	0
Lahti	2025	Ykkösliiga	16	1	0	0	3	0	–		19	1
Lahti	2026	Veikkausliiga	11	0	5	0	5	0	–		21	0
Lahti	Total		32	1	6	0	13	0	0	0	51	1
Career total			80	3	8	0	13	0	0	0	101	3
