= Abdoulaye Kanté (footballer, born 2000) =

French footballer (born 2000)

Personal information
- Date of birth: 4 March 2000 (age 26)
- Place of birth: Pontoise, France
- Height: 1.86 m (6 ft 1 in)
- Position: Midfielder

Team information
- Current team: Brooklyn FC

Youth career
- 2017–2019: Bourges
- 2021–2022: Leixões U23

Senior career*
Years	Team	Apps	(Gls)
2018–2020	Bourges	15	(0)
2019–2020	→ Vila Real (loan)	22	(0)
2020–2021	La Louvière Centre	1	(0)
2022–2023	EIF	36	(7)
2024	Ilves	5	(0)
2024	Ilves II	1	(1)
2024	→ EIF (loan)	10	(1)
2025	Lahti	22	(3)
2026–	Brooklyn FC	23	(3)
- * Club domestic league appearances and goals as of November 4, 2026

Abdoulaye Kanté (born 4 March 2000) is a French professional footballer who plays as a midfielder for Brooklyn FC in the USL Championship. After starting in his native France, Kanté has played in the lower divisions in Portugal, Belgium, and Finland before he moved to the United States in the winter 2026.

== Career ==
Kanté started his senior career with French club Bourges Foot 18 in 2018.

During the 2019–2020 season he was loaned out to Portuguese club Vila Real in the country’s third-tier.

In the first half of the 2020–21 season Kanté was in the La Louvière Centre squad in Belgium, before returning to Portugal and joining Leixões. In the 2021–22 season he played for the club's U23 youth team in the Liga Revelação.

=== Ekenäs IF ===
In August 2022, Kanté signed with Ekenäs IF (EIF), playing in Ykkönen, the Finnish second-tier league. After the season, his contract was extended for one year. At the end of the next 2023 season, Kanté helped the club to win the promotion to Finland's premier division Veikkausliiga for the first time in 90 years, and only the second time in the club's entire history. He scored a brace and provided an assist in the decisive 3–1 away win against Turun Palloseura (TPS) on 2 October 2023, which secured the Ykkönen title and the promotion for EIF.

=== Ilves ===
On 1 December 2023, a fellow Veikkausliiga side Ilves announced the signing of Kanté on a two-year deal on a free transfer. He debuted with his new club on 27 January 2024, in a Finnish League Cup win against Kuopion Palloseura (KuPS).

=== Ekenäs IF (loan) ===
On 7 March 2024, Kanté was loaned back to EIF for a larger amount of guaranteed playing minutes. On 26 April, Kanté scored his first Veikkausliiga goal, in a 2–1 away defeat against Inter Turku. On 19 June, in a home match against IFK Mariehamn, Kanté was sent off on the first minute of the match, with his second red card of the season.

=== Return to Ilves ===
On 23 July 2024, Kanté was called back to Ilves. During the latter part of the season, Kanté made five appearances in the league, and additionally two appearances in the UECL qualifiers. On 10 January 2025, his contract was terminated by mutual agreement.

=== Lahti ===
On 13 February 2025, Kanté signed with Lahti in Finnish second-tier Ykkösliiga. On 25 May, Kanté scored his first goal in Ykkösliiga, the winning goal in a 5–3 home win over Käpylän Pallo.

=== Brooklyn FC ===
On 26 February 2026, Brooklyn FC announced they had signed Kanté to a contract for the 2026 USL Championship season.

== Personal life ==
Born in France, Kanté is of Malian descent.

== Career statistics ==
As of 25 May 2025

Appearances and goals by club, season and competition
Club	Season	League			National cup (Note: Includes Suomen Cup)		League cup (Note: Includes Ykköscup, Finnish League Cup and Ykkösliigacup)		Europe		Total	
Club	Season	Division	Apps	Goals	Apps	Goals	Apps	Goals	Apps	Goals	Apps	Goals
Bourges	2018–19	National 3	15	0	0	0	—		—		15	0
Vila Real (loan)	2019–20	Campeonato de Portugal	22	0	0	0	—		—		22	0
La Louvière Centre	2020–21	Belgian Division 1	1	0	0	0	—		—		1	0
Leixões	2021–22	Liga Portugal 2	0	0	0	0	—		—		0	0
Ekenäs IF	2022	Ykkönen	10	0	0	0	—		—		10	0
Ekenäs IF	2023	Ykkönen	26	7	3	0	4	2	—		33	9
Ekenäs IF	Total		36	7	3	0	4	2	0	0	43	9
Ilves	2024	Veikkausliiga	5	0	—		4	0	2 (Note: Includes UEFA Conference League)	0	11	0
Ilves II	2024	Kakkonen	1	1	—		—		—		1	1
Ekenäs IF (loan)	2024	Veikkausliiga	10	1	3	0	—		—		13	1
Lahti	2025	Ykkösliiga	3	1	0	0	3	1	–		6	2
Career total			93	10	6	0	11	3	2	0	112	13

== Honours ==
Ekenäs IF

- Ykkönen: 2023

Ilves

- Veikkausliiga runner-up: 2024
