= Abdoulaye Kanté =

Abdoulaye Kanté may refer to:

- Abdoulaye Kanté (footballer, born 2000), French football midfielder for Lahti
- Abdoulaye Kanté (footballer, born 2005), Ivorian football midfielder for Al-Ettifaq
