= 2025 Ykkösliiga =

Finnish football league season

Ykkösliiga
- Season: 2025
- Dates: 21 April 2025 – 18 October 2025
- Champions: Lahti
- Promoted: Lahti; TPS
- Relegated: SalPa
- Matches: 130
- Goals: 426 (3.28 per match)
- Top goalscorer: Salomo Ojala (19 goals)
- Biggest home win: PK-35 4–0 KäPa (18 May 2025); Ekenäs IF 4–0 SalPa (9 July 2025)
- Biggest away win: JäPS 0–6 TPS (2 May 2025)
- Highest scoring: Klubi 04 4–6 JäPS (23 April 2025)
- All statistics correct as of 4 October 2025.

The 2025 Ykkösliiga was the second season of the Ykkösliiga, the second highest league in the Finnish football league system. The season began on 21 April 2025 and ended on 18 October 2025.

== Teams ==
The league consisted of ten teams; seven teams remaining from the previous season, one team promoted from the Ykkönen, and two teams relegated from the Veikkausliiga.

=== Team changes ===
The promoted team was the 2024 Ykkönen champions Klubi 04. They replaced the 2024 Ykkösliiga bottom-placed team MP.

The relegated teams were the 2024 Veikkausliiga bottom-placed team Ekenäs IF and Veikkausliiga play-off losers Lahti. They replaced the 2024 Ykkösliiga champions KTP and Veikkausliiga play-off winners Jaro.

=== Stadiums and locations ===
Location of teams in 2025 Ykkösliiga

Club	Location	Stadium	Capacity	Manager
EIF	Raseborg	Ekenäs Centrumplan	1,400	(Finland) Christian Sund
JIPPO	Joensuu	Mehtimäki	1,000	(Finland) Mikko Hallikainen
JäPS	Järvenpää	Järvenpään keskuskenttä	2,000	(Finland) Teemu Kankkunen
Klubi 04	Helsinki	Bolt Arena	10,770	(Finland) Aleksi Lalli
KäPa	Helsinki	Brahenkenttä	1,200	(Finland) Lari Lummepuro
Lahti	Lahti	Lahti Stadium	7,465	(Portugal) Gonçalo Pereira
PK-35	Helsinki	Mustapekka Areena	2,200	(Portugal) Tiago Santos
SalPa	Salo	Salon Urheilupuisto	2,500	(Finland) Ilkka Virtanen
SJK Akatemia	Seinäjoki	OmaSP Stadion	5,817	(England) Ash Civil
TPS	Turku	Veritas Stadion	9,372	(Spain) Ivan Piñol

== Season ==
=== League table ===
Pos	Team	Pld	W	D	L	GF	GA	GD	Pts	Promotion, qualification or relegation
1	Lahti (C, P)	27	17	7	3	54	30	+24	58	Promotion to the Veikkausliiga
2	TPS (O, P)	27	16	5	6	66	45	+21	53	Qualification for the Veikkausliiga play-off
3	JIPPO	27	10	11	6	37	31	+6	41	
4	EIF	27	12	5	10	48	43	+5	41	
5	PK-35	27	11	9	7	39	30	+9	40 (Note: PK-35 were deducted two points for failing to fulfill the league license criteria.)	
6	Klubi 04	27	11	6	10	49	45	+4	39	
7	JäPS	27	7	11	9	41	50	−9	32	
8	SJK Akatemia	27	8	5	14	46	49	−3	29	
9	KäPa (O)	27	4	8	15	41	68	−27	20	Qualification for the Ykkösliiga play-off
10	SalPa (R)	27	4	3	20	22	52	−30	15	Relegation to the Ykkönen

Source: Soccerway
Rules for classification: 1) Points; 2) Goal difference; 3) Goals scored; 4) Head-to-head points; 5) Head-to-head goal difference; 6) Head-to-head away goals scored; 7) Play-off
(Note: Play-off is only played if need to decide teams for promotion or relegation).
(C) Champions; (O) Play-off winners; (P) Promoted; (R) Relegated

=== Results ===
Home \ Away	EIF	JIP	JÄP	KLU	KÄP	LAH	PK	SAL	SJK	TPS	EIF	JIP	JÄP	KLU	KÄP	LAH	PK	SAL	SJK	TPS
EIF	—	1–1	4–2	3–4	4–2	0–1	2–0	4–0	3–1	0–2	—	—	—	2–1	4–1	0–2	—	2–3	2–3	—
JIPPO	3–2	—	1–1	0–3	3–1	3–1	1–1	2–0	3–1	1–2	2–2	—	—	0–1	2–1	1–0	—	—	—	—
JäPS	1–1	1–1	—	2–0	2–2	2–1	1–4	4–3	2–2	0–6	0–0	1–1	—	—	—	—	—	2–0	—	1–1
Klubi 04	2–2	1–1	4–6	—	1–1	0–2	1–1	3–1	3–2	3–1	—	—	2–1	—	0–1	—	—	1–0	1–4	2–3
KäPa	1–3	1–1	0–3	0–5	—	2–2	1–1	3–1	0–3	4–2	—	—	2–3	—	—	—	—	1–2	3–1	3–3
Lahti	3–1	3–2	2–0	2–1	5–3	—	2–1	1–0	1–0	2–2	—	—	2–1	2–2	2–2	—	1–0	—	3–0	—
PK-35	1–2	1–1	1–0	1–1	4–0	0–0	—	3–1	2–1	2–3	1–2	0–2	0–0	2–1	1–1	—	—	—	—	—
SalPa	0–1	0–0	1–1	0–3	1–0	1–2	1–2	—	0–0	1–2	—	0–1	—	—	—	1–4	1–2	—	—	1–0
SJK Akatemia	0–1	3–1	4–1	1–2	5–3	0–3	1–1	3–0	—	3–4	—	1–1	1–1	—	—	—	1–2	2–1	—	—
TPS	2–0	2–1	4–2	4–1	4–2	2–2	1–2	3–2	3–2	—	4–0	0–1	—	—	—	3–3	1–3	—	2–1	—

Source: Soccerway
Legend: Blue = home team win; Yellow = draw; Red = away team win.

== Ykkösliiga play-off ==
The ninth-placed team (KäPa) faced the second-placed team of the 2025 Ykkönen (OLS) in a two-legged play-off for the final place in the 2026 Ykkösliiga.

=== First leg ===
23 October 2025	OLS	0–3	KäPa	Oulu
16:30 BST			Kallio 33'; Lika 60'; Jouhi 73'	Stadium: Castrén

=== Second leg ===
26 October 2025	KäPa	4–2 (7–2 agg.)	OLS	Helsinki
14:00 BST	Manneh 18'; Anini Junior 23', 48'; Kallio 61'		Babb 57'; Raittinen 64'	Stadium: Brahenkenttä

== Season statistics ==
=== Top goalscorers ===
As of 26 October 2025

Rank	Player	Club	Goals
1	(Finland) Salomo Ojala	Ekenäs IF	19
2	(Finland) Onni Helén	TPS	14
3	(Kosovo) Albijon Muzaci	TPS	13
4	(Finland) Elias Kallio	Käpylän Pallo	12
5	(Finland) Tuomas Pippola	TPS	10
5	(Finland) Justus Ojanen	SJK Akatemia	10
5	(Finland) Otso Koskinen	Lahti	10
5	(Finland) Eino-Iivari Pitkälä	PK-35	10
9	(Finland) Onni Hänninen	SJK Akatemia	9
10	(Finland) Stanislav Baranov	Klubi 04	8
10	(Somalia) Ayuub Ahmed-Nur	PK-35	8
10	(Finland) Impton Söderlund	JäPS	8

=== Hat-tricks ===
As of 3 July 2025

Player	For	Against	Result	Date
(Finland) Stanislav Baranov	Klubi 04	Ekenäs IF	4–3 (A)	12 May 2025
(Finland) Otso Koskinen	FC Lahti	Käpylän Pallo	5–3 (H)	25 May 2025
(Finland) Justus Ojanen	SJK Akatemia	Käpylän Pallo	5–3 (Y)	18 June 2025
(Portugal) Martim Ferreira	FC Lahti	Jippo	3–2 (H)	3 July 2025

=== Clean sheets ===
As of 14 June 2025

Rank	Player	Club	Clean sheets
1	(Finland) Osku Maukonen	Lahti	6
2	(Greece) Dimitrios Goumas	PK-35	3
3	(Finland) Otso Linnas	Ekenäs IF	2
3	(Nigeria) Samuel James	SJK Akatemia	2
3	(Finland) Olli Hakanpää	TPS	2
3	(Finland) Joonas Koski	SalPa	2
3	(Finland) Pyry Piirainen	Jippo	2
8	(Finland) Alex Ramula	Klubi 04	1
8	(Finland) Lauri Vetri	SalPa	1
8	(Finland) Janne Laiho	JäPS	1

== Awards ==
=== Monthly awards ===
Month	Player of the Month	Ref
May	(Finland) Stanislav Baranov (Klubi 04)	
June	(Finland) Tuomas Pippola (TPS)	
July	(Finland) Elias Kallio (Käpylän Pallo)	
August	(Finland) Besart Mustafa (JäPS)	
September	(Finland) Salomo Ojala (Ekenäs IF)	

== Attendances ==
#	Club	Average
1	Lahti	1,671
2	TPS	1,184
3	SJK Akatemia	1,003
4	JäPS	675
5	EIF	615
6	JIPPO	570
7	PK-35	517
8	SalPa	513
9	Klubi 04	271
10	KäPa	249

== See also ==
- 2025 Veikkausliiga
- 2025 Finnish Cup
- 2025 Kakkonen
- List of Finnish football transfers winter 2024–25
