= Onni Hänninen =

Finnish footballer (born 2005)

Personal information
- Full name: Onni Akseli Hänninen
- Date of birth: 29 April 2005 (age 21)
- Place of birth: Lahti, Finland
- Height: 1.82 m (6 ft 0 in)
- Position: Forward

Team information
- Current team: KTP
- Number: 21

Youth career
- Kuusysi
- Lahti
- 2021–2022: Ferencváros

Senior career*
Years	Team	Apps	(Gls)
2022–2023	Reipas Lahti	9	(4)
2022–2023	Lahti	17	(1)
2024–2025	SJK Akatemia	51	(12)
2024–2025	SJK Akatemia II	4	(4)
2026–	KTP	22	(4)

International career^{‡}
2021–2022	Finland U17	10	(2)
2022–2023	Finland U18	4	(2)
2023–	Finland U19	2	(0)
- * Club domestic league appearances and goals as of 1 November 2026 ‡ National team caps and goals as of 1 October 2023

Onni Hänninen (born 29 April 2005) is a Finnish professional footballer who plays as a forward for Ykkösliiga club KTP.

== Club career ==
Hänninen moved to Hungary in 2021 and signed a deal with Ferencváros youth academy. One year later, he returned to Finland and signed his first professional contract with his hometown club FC Lahti, on a deal until the end of 2024. He scored his first Veikkausliiga goal on 26 May 2023, in a 1–2 home defeat against AC Oulu.

On 5 March 2024, Hänninen joined fellow Veikkausliiga club SJK after signing a two-year deal with the club. He was initially assigned to the club's reserve team SJK Akatemia, competing in Finnish second-tier Ykkösliiga.

== International career ==
A regular Finnish youth international, Hänninen has represented Finland at under-17, under-18 and under-19 youth national team levels.

== Career statistics ==
As of 29 June 2025

Appearances and goals by club, season and competition
Club	Season	League			National cup (Note: Includes Finnish Cup)		League cup (Note: Includes Finnish League Cup and Ykkösliigacup)		Continental		Total	
Club	Season	Division	Apps	Goals	Apps	Goals	Apps	Goals	Apps	Goals	Apps	Goals
Reipas Lahti	2022	Kakkonen	4	2	—		—		—		4	2
Reipas Lahti	2023	Kakkonen	8	2	—		—		—		8	2
Reipas Lahti	Total		12	4	0	0	0	0	0	0	12	4
Lahti	2022	Veikkausliiga	5	0	0	0	0	0	—		5	0
Lahti	2023	Veikkausliiga	12	1	3	0	3	0	—		18	1
Lahti	Total		17	1	3	0	3	0	0	0	23	1
SJK Akatemia II	2024	Kakkonen	4	4	–		–		–		4	4
SJK Akatemia	2024	Ykkösliiga	24	3	3	4	2	0	–		29	7
SJK Akatemia	2025	Ykkösliiga	13	3	2	3	4	1	–		19	7
SJK Akatemia	Total		37	6	5	7	6	1	0	0	48	14
Career total			70	15	8	7	9	1	0	0	87	23
