= Eero-Matti Auvinen =

Finnish footballer (born 1996)

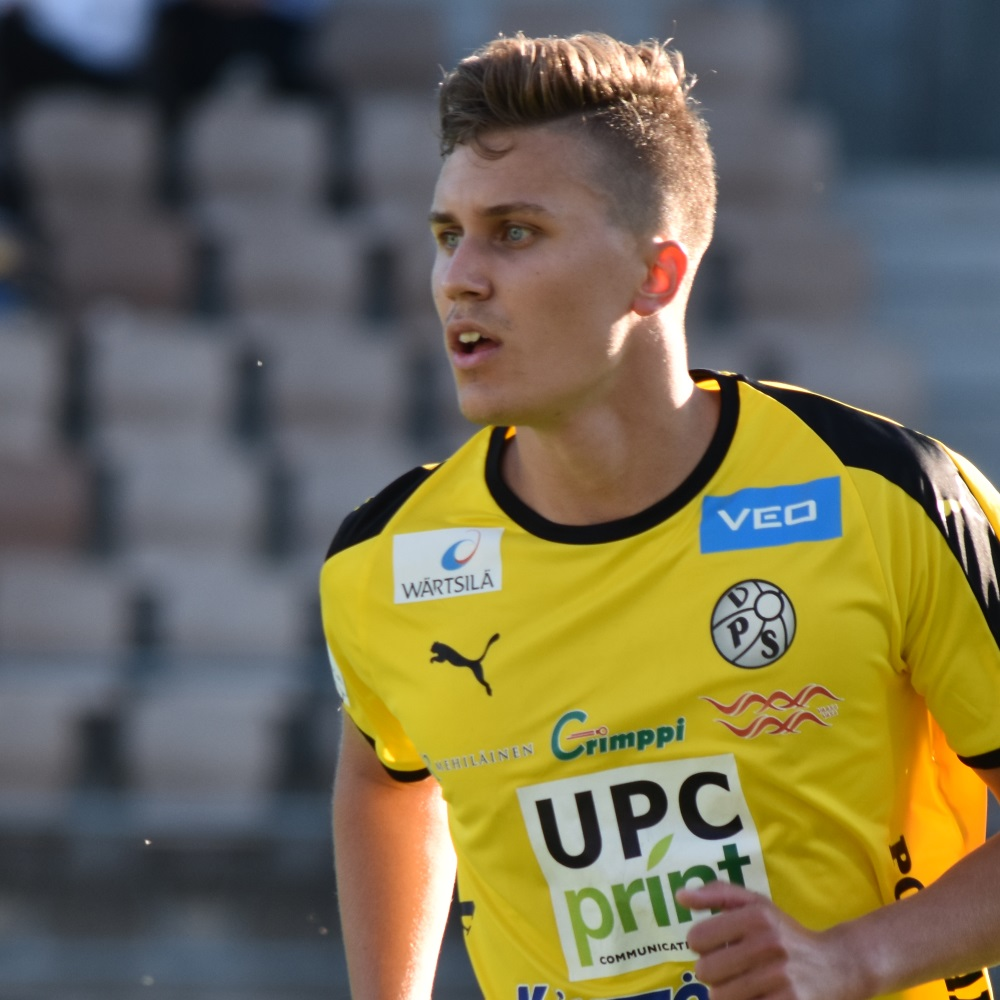
- Auvinen with VPS in 2018.

Personal information
- Date of birth: 5 March 1996 (age 30)
- Place of birth: Janakkala, Finland
- Height: 1.88 m (6 ft 2 in)
- Position: Centre-back

Team information
- Current team: Haka
- Number: 4

Youth career
- Janakkalan Pallo
- HJS

Senior career*
Years	Team	Apps	(Gls)
2013–2014	Hämeenlinna	26	(2)
2015–2016	Haka	19	(1)
2017	AC Oulu	26	(2)
2018–2019	VPS	58	(1)
2020	HIFK	15	(1)
2021–2023	Haka	74	(2)
2024	IFK Mariehamn	23	(0)
2025	HJS	7	(1)
2026–	Haka	23	(2)
- * Club domestic league appearances and goals as of 1 November 2026

Eero-Matti Auvinen (born 5 March 1996) is a Finnish professional footballer who plays for Haka, as a centre-back.

== Career ==
He signed for IFK Mariehamn for the 2024 season. During the season, he suffered from a long-lasting pain in his heel which formed a lump. It was later diagnosed a Haglund's syndrome and required a surgery.
