= Tuomas Pippola =

Finnish footballer (born 2004)

Personal information
- Date of birth: 12 October 2004 (age 22)
- Place of birth: Turku, Finland
- Height: 1.88 m (6 ft 2 in)
- Position: Midfielder

Team information
- Current team: TPS

Youth career
- –2016: TPS
- 2017–2019: Inter Turku
- 2019–2021: TPS

Senior career*
Years	Team	Apps	(Gls)
2022	KuPS	0	(0)
2022	KuPS II	19	(1)
2023–2025	TPS	59	(13)
2025–	Sogndal	37	(9)

International career^{‡}
2022	Finland U18	2	(0)
2025–	Finland U21	2	(0)
- * Club domestic league appearances and goals as of 14 November 2026 ‡ National team caps and goals as of 31 March 2026

Tuomas Pippola (born 12 October 2004) is a Finnish professional footballer who plays as an attacking midfielder for 1. divisjon club Sogndal.

== Career ==
Pippola was born in Turku and played in the youth sectors of Turun Palloseura and briefly with Inter Turku.

After spending the 2022 season with KuPS, Pippola returned to his former club TPS in January 2023. On 9 September 2024, his deal was extended until the end of 2026.

In August 2025, Pippola joined Sogndal in Norwegian 1. divisjon on a three-year deal for an undisclosed six-figure fee with a re-sale clause.

== Career statistics ==
As of 30 June 2026

Appearances and goals by club, season and competition
Club	Season	League			National cup (Note: Includes Finnish Cup and Norwegian Cup)		League cup (Note: Includes Finnish League Cup, Ykkönen Cup and Ykkösliigacup)		Total	
Club	Season	Division	Apps	Goals	Apps	Goals	Apps	Goals	Apps	Goals
TPS U23	2021	Kolmonen	6	0	–		–		6	0
KuPS	2022	Veikkausliiga	0	0	0	0	1	0	1	0
KuPS Akatemia	2022	Kakkonen	19	1	–		–		19	1
TPS Akatemia	2023	Kolmonen	7	0	–		–		7	0
TPS	2023	Ykkönen	19	1	1	0	2	0	22	1
TPS	2024	Ykkösliiga	23	2	5	0	3	1	31	3
TPS	2025	Ykkösliiga	17	10	2	1	5	3	24	14
TPS	Total		59	13	8	1	10	4	77	18
Sogndal	2025	1. divisjon	11	1	1	0	–		12	1
Sogndal	2026	1. divisjon	11	5	0	0	–		11	5
Sogndal	Total		22	6	1	0	0	0	23	6
Career total			113	20	9	1	11	4	133	25

== Honours ==
Individual

- Ykkösliiga Player of the Month: June 2025
