= Riku Selander =

Finnish footballer (born 1994)

Personal information
- Date of birth: 22 November 1994 (age 31)
- Place of birth: Finland
- Positions: Midfielder; defender

Team information
- Current team: JäPS
- Number: 14

Youth career
- Puotinkylän Valtti
- Jokerit
- AC Allianssi
- PK-35

Senior career*
Years	Team	Apps	(Gls)
2012	PK-35	24	(1)
2013–2014	PK-35 Vantaa	17	(1)
2013	→ Pallohonka (loan)	11	(1)
2015–2016	Honka	21	(2)
2017	Gnistan	25	(4)
2018	EIF	24	(1)
2019–2020	HIFK	42	(0)
2021	EIF	24	(1)
2022–2023	AC Oulu	52	(2)
2024	Lahti	24	(0)
2025	Haka	17	(0)
2026–	JäPS	24	(2)
- * Club domestic league appearances and goals as of 1 November 2026

Riku Selander (born 22 November 1994) is a Finnish professional footballer who plays for JäPS, as a midfielder.

== Club career ==
On 24 November 2021, Selander signed with Veikkausliiga club AC Oulu for the 2022 season. On 6 April 2022, he scored his first goal in the league, in a season opening match against Vaasan Palloseura (VPS), helping his side to get a 2–2 away draw. He left the club after the 2023 season.

On 10 November 2023, FC Lahti announced the signing of Selander on a one-year deal.

== Career statistics ==
As of 26 July 2026.

Appearances and goals by club, season and competition
Club	Season	League			Cup		League cup		Total	
Club	Season	Division	Apps	Goals	Apps	Goals	Apps	Goals	Apps	Goals
PK-35	2012	Kakkonen	24	1	–		–		24	1
PK-35 Vantaa	2013	Ykkönen	4	0	–		–		4	0
PK-35 Vantaa	2014	Ykkönen	13	1	3	0	–		16	1
PK-35 Vantaa	Total		17	1	3	0	0	0	20	1
Pallohonka (loan)	2013	Kakkonen	11	1	–		–		11	1
Honka Akatemia	2015	Nelonen	1	0	–		–		1	0
Honka	2015	Kakkonen	11	2	–		–		11	2
Honka	2016	Kakkonen	10	0	1	0	–		11	0
Honka	Total		21	2	1	0	0	0	22	2
Gnistan	2017	Ykkönen	25	4	4	0	–		29	4
Ekenäs IF	2018	Ykkönen	24	1	7	1	–		31	2
HIFK	2019	Veikkausliiga	23	0	3	0	–		26	0
HIFK	2020	Veikkausliiga	19	0	4	0	–		23	0
HIFK	Total		42	0	7	0	0	0	49	0
Ekenäs IF	2021	Ykkönen	24	1	1	0	–		25	1
AC Oulu	2022	Veikkausliiga	26	1	3	0	2	0	31	1
AC Oulu	2023	Veikkausliiga	26	1	4	0	7	0	37	1
AC Oulu	Total		52	2	7	0	9	0	68	2
Lahti	2024	Veikkausliiga	24	0	2	0	4	0	30	0
Haka	2025	Veikkausliiga	17	0	3	0	1	0	21	0
JäPS	2026	Ykkösliiga	13	1	2	0	0	0	15	1
Career total			295	14	37	1	14	0	346	15

== Honours ==
AC Oulu

- Finnish League Cup runner-up: 2023
