= Topi Ala =

Finnish footballer (born 2006)

Personal information
- Date of birth: 13 February 2006 (age 20)
- Place of birth: Finland
- Position: Central midfielder

Team information
- Current team: HJS

Youth career
- 2012–2015: NoPS
- 2015–2023: Ilves

Senior career*
Years	Team	Apps	(Gls)
2023–	Ilves II	26	(1)
2024	Ilves	1	(0)
2025-	HJS	0	(0)
- * Club domestic league appearances and goals as of 22 April 2025

Topi Ala (born 13 February 2006) is a Finnish footballer who plays as a central midfielder for Kakkonen side HJS.

== Career ==
On 17 May 2024, Ala debuted in Veikkausliiga with Ilves first team, in a 5–0 home win over Haka.

== Honours ==
Ilves

- Veikkausliiga runner-up: 2024
