= Hemmo Riihimäki =

Finnish footballer (born 2003)

Personal information
- Date of birth: 3 June 2003 (age 23)
- Place of birth: Salo, Finland
- Height: 1.88 m (6 ft 2 in)
- Position: Goalkeeper

Team information
- Current team: KuPS
- Number: 12

Youth career
- –2020: KuPS

Senior career*
Years	Team	Apps	(Gls)
2018–2020	KuFu-98	21	(0)
2020–2023	KuPS	0	(0)
2021	→ KPV (loan)	7	(0)
2022	→ Ekenäs IF (loan)	15	(0)
2023	→ KuPS II	3	(0)
2024–2025	SJK	8	(0)
2024–2025	SJK II	3	(0)
2026–	KuPS	5	(0)

International career^{‡}
2018	Finland U15	2	(0)
2018	Finland U16	3	(0)
2019–2020	Finland U17	10	(0)
2021–2022	Finland U19	7	(0)
- * Club domestic league appearances and goals as of 12 November 2026 ‡ National team caps and goals as of 19 February 2024

Hemmo Riihimäki (born 3 June 2003) is a Finnish professional footballer who plays as a goalkeeper for Veikkausliiga club KuPS.

== Club career ==
On 16 August 2024, Riihimäki made his Veikkausliiga debut for SJK, in an away match against Inter Turku, as a substitute to injured Roope Paunio.
