= Henri Malundama =

Finnish footballer (born 1995)

Personal information
- Full name: Ngando Henri Malundama
- Date of birth: 8 June 1995 (age 31)
- Place of birth: Tampere, Finland
- Height: 1.77 m (5 ft 10 in)
- Position: Defender

Team information
- Current team: AFC Eskilstuna

Youth career
- –2012: TKT Tampere
- 2013–2014: Ilves

Senior career*
Years	Team	Apps	(Gls)
2013	TPV	8	(0)
2013–2015	Ilves	25	(2)
2014	→ Ilves-Kissat (loan)	5	(0)
2015	→ AC Kajaani (loan)	13	(0)
2016	Pallo-Sepot 44	1	(0)
2017–2023	Haka	176	(6)
2024	Ekenäs IF	0	(0)
2024–	AFC Eskilstuna	10	(0)
- * Club domestic league appearances and goals as of 25 November 2024

Ngando Henri Malundama (born 8 June 1995) is a Finnish professional footballer who plays as a defender for Ettan clud AFC Eskilstuna.

== Club career ==
Malundama played for FC Haka for seven seasons, starting in the second-tier Ykkönen with the team in 2017, winning a promotion to Veikkausliiga in 2019 season, and representing Haka in the 2023–24 UEFA Europa Conference League qualifiers. He was also named the footballer of the year in Valkeakoski in 2021.

On 20 December 2023, it was announced that Malundama will join newly promoted Veikkausliiga club EIF for the 2024 Veikkausliiga season.

In August 2024, Malundama joined Swedish club AFC Eskilstuna.

== Personal life ==
Malundama was born and raised in Finland to a Congolese mother and a Cameroonian father.

== Honours ==
Haka

- Ykkönen: 2019
