= Gonçalo Pereira (football manager) =

Portuguese football manager (born 1989)

Personal information
- Full name: Gonçalo Miguel Machadinho da Silva Pereira
- Date of birth: 12 August 1989 (age 37)
- Place of birth: Portugal

Team information
- Current team: Lahti (manager)

Managerial career
- Years: Team
- 2015–2016: Kongsvinger 2
- 2015–2016: Kongsvinger (assistant)
- 2018: Brommapojkarna (assistant)
- 2018: Brommapojkarna (caretaker)
- 2019: Riga FC (assistant)
- 2021–2022: Florø
- 2024: KPV
- 2025–: Lahti

Gonçalo Miguel Machadinho da Silva Pereira (born 12 August 1989) is a Portuguese football manager, who serves as the manager of Finnish club FC Lahti in Veikkausliiga.

== Coaching Career ==
Pereira started coaching for the Sporting CP Youth Academy in 2007 when he was 18 years old. He continued in the youth sectors of Benfica, Manchester United and Sacavenense, and worked as an analyst for Estoril.

Pereira began his coaching career in Norway with Kongsvinger, where he managed the reserve team and served as an assistant for the first team. In 2018, he moved to Sweden to join IF Brommapojkarna as an assistant coach, later serving as the club's caretaker manager.

After a stint as an assistant at Riga FC in Latvia and a period as head coach of Florø SK in Norway, Pereira moved to Finland in 2024 to manage KPV in Ykkönen. For the 2024 season, Pereira was named the head coach of KPV Kokkola in Finnish third tier. He led KPV to finish as the Ykkönen runner-up. Earlier in September 2024, his contract was extended for the 2025 season.

On 20 December 2024, newly relegated Lahti in Finnish second-tier Ykkösliiga announced that they had named Pereira the new manager for the 2025 season. Lahti paid KPV a fee for his contract. Pereira signed a contract for two seasons, with a one-year option.

In his first season with Lahti, Pereira led the club to the 2025 Ykkösliiga title, securing immediate promotion back to the Veikkausliiga for the 2026 season. Under his leadership, the team established a dominant defensive record, eventually winning the league with several matches to spare.

== Managerial statistics ==
As of 20 January 2026

Team	Nat	From	To	Record				
Team	Nat	From	To	G	W	D	L	Win %
Florø	(Norway)	1 January 2021	31 December 2022	52	17	8	27	32.69
KPV	(Finland)	1 January 2024	31 October 2024	32	18	7	7	56.25
Lahti	(Finland)	1 January 2025	Present	33	20	7	6	60.61
Total				117	55	22	40	47.01

== Honours ==
KPV

- Ykkönen runner-up: 2024

FC Lahti

- Ykkösliiga: 2025
