= Otso Koskinen =

Finnish footballer (born 2003)

Personal information
- Date of birth: 1 January 2003 (age 23)
- Place of birth: Vantaa, Finland
- Height: 1.80 m (5 ft 11 in)
- Position: Midfielder

Team information
- Current team: Lahti
- Number: 10

Youth career
- 2007–2019: VJS
- 2019–2020: Honka

Senior career*
Years	Team	Apps	(Gls)
2020–2023	Honka II	10	(2)
2021–2023	Honka	62	(6)
2024–	Lahti	64	(17)

International career^{‡}
2019	Finland U16	5	(0)
2019–2020	Finland U17	8	(1)
2021–2022	Finland U19	6	(0)
2023	Finland U21	2	(0)
- * Club domestic league appearances and goals as of 13 November 2026 ‡ National team caps and goals as of 22 December 2023

Otso Koskinen (born 1 January 2003) is a Finnish professional footballer who plays as a midfielder for Veikkausliiga side Lahti.

== Career ==
=== Honka ===
Born in Vantaa, Koskinen started to play football in the youth sector of Vantaan Jalkapalloseura, before joining the FC Honka youth system in 2019. He went on to make his senior debut with the club's reserve team in the third-tier league Kakkonen in 2020. Later he made his Veikkausliiga debut with the Honka first team in 2021.

=== Lahti ===
After the 2023 season, Honka was suddenly declared for bankruptcy, and Koskinen was released. Soon after, it was announced that Koskinen had signed with fellow Veikkausliiga side FC Lahti on a two-year deal, starting in 2024. He debuted with his new club on 27 January 2024, in a Finnish League Cup match against Inter Turku, scoring a goal in a 3–2 loss. On 25 May 2025, Koskinen scored a hat-trick for Lahti, in a 5–3 win against Käpylän Pallo in Ykkösliiga. FC Lahti supporters (FCLK) awarded Otso Koskinen as player of the season in 2025.

== Career statistics ==
As of 25 May 2025

Appearances and goals by club, season and competition
Club	Season	League			Cup (Note: Includes Suomen Cup)		League cup (Note: Includes Finnish League Cup and Ykkösliigacup)		Europe		Total	
Club	Season	Division	Apps	Goals	Apps	Goals	Apps	Goals	Apps	Goals	Apps	Goals
Honka Akatemia	2020	Kakkonen	4	1	–		–		–		4	1
Honka Akatemia	2021	Kakkonen	2	1	–		–		–		2	1
Honka Akatemia	2022	Kakkonen	2	0	–		–		–		2	0
Honka Akatemia	2023	Kakkonen	2	0	–		–		–		2	0
Honka Akatemia	Total		10	2	0	0	0	0	0	0	10	2
Honka	2021	Veikkausliiga	24	2	5	1	–		2 (Note: Appearances in UEFA Conference League)	0	31	3
Honka	2022	Veikkausliiga	15	2	0	0	5	0	–		20	2
Honka	2023	Veikkausliiga	23	2	5	0	5	0	2	0	35	2
Honka	Total		62	6	10	1	10	0	4	0	86	7
Lahti	2024	Veikkausliiga	22	1	2	0	5	1	–		29	2
Lahti	2025	Ykkösliiga	5	5	1	0	4	0	–		10	5
Lahti	Total		27	6	3	0	9	1	0	0	39	7
Career total			115	14	13	1	19	1	4	0	151	16

== Honours ==
FC Honka

- Finnish Cup runner-up: 2023
- Finnish League Cup: 2022
