= Elias Kallio =

Finnish footballer (born 2003)

Personal information
- Date of birth: 22 October 2003 (age 23)
- Place of birth: Espoo, Finland
- Height: 1.80 m (5 ft 11 in)
- Positions: Midfielder; winger

Team information
- Current team: AC Oulu
- Number: 27

Youth career
- –2021: Honka

Senior career*
Years	Team	Apps	(Gls)
2022–2023	PPJ	33	(17)
2024–2025	Käpylän Pallo	54	(17)
2026–	AC Oulu	28	(2)
- * Club domestic league appearances and goals as of 12 November 2026

Elias Kallio (born 22 October 2003) is a Finnish professional football winger for Veikkausliiga club AC Oulu.

== Club career ==
Kallio played in the youth sector of Honka.

He made his senior debut with PPJ in third-tier Kakkonen in 2022.

During 2024–2025, Kallio played for Käpylän Pallo in second-tier Ykkösliiga. He was named the Ykkösliiga Player of the Month in July 2025.

In November 2025, Kallio signed with Veikkausliiga club AC Oulu for two seasons. During the 2026 Finnish League Cup, Kallio scored four goals in seven matches, and helped Oulu to finish 2nd in the tournament. He made his league debut on 4 April 2026, providing an assist in a 5–1 away win against Gnistan. One week later, Kallio scored his first league goal, a winning goal in a 1–0 away win against HJK Helsinki at Töölö Football Stadium.

== Honours ==
AC Oulu

- Finnish League Cup runner-up: 2026

Individual

- Ykkösliiga Player of the Month: July 2025
