= Méry Traoré =

Malian footballer (born 2003)

Personal information
- Date of birth: 20 December 2003 (age 22)
- Place of birth: Kalabancoro, Mali
- Height: 1.85 m (6 ft 1 in)
- Position: Midfielder

Team information
- Current team: Nevėžis (on loan from Kauno Žalgiris)

Youth career
- Diarra

Senior career*
| Years | Team | Apps | (Gls) |
| 2022–2023 | Diarra | ? | (11) |
| 2023 | → Ilves (loan) | 10 | (3) |
| 2023 | → Ilves II (loan) | 1 | (0) |
| 2024– | Kauno Žalgiris | 1 | (0) |
| 2024– | Kauno Žalgiris B | 23 | (9) |
| 2025– | → Nevėžis (loan) | 14 | (6) |

International career^{‡}
| 2022 | Mali U20 | 1 | (0) |
Medal record
Ilves
| First place | Finnish Cup | 2023 |
- * Club domestic league appearances and goals as of 29 June 2025 ‡ National team caps and goals as of 4 November 2023

Méry Traoré (born 20 December 2003) is a Malian professional football player who plays as a forward for Lithuanian club Nevėžis, on loan from Kauno Žalgiris.

== Career ==
In July 2023, Traoré joined Finnish Veikkausliiga club Ilves on loan until the end of the 2023 season with the option to buy. Having travelled to Europe from his native Mali in order to undergo a trial with a club in Austria, he joined Ilves following a breakdown in talks. In January 2024, he departed the club with the option for a second year's loan deal not having been taken. During his time with the club he scored three goals, contributing as his side won the 2023 Finnish Cup, an unused substitute in the final.

In March 2024, Traoré joined Lithuanian A Lyga club Kauno Žalgiris, initially joining up with the club's B team in I Lyga.

== International career ==
In August 2022, Traoré was called up to the Mali U20 squad.

== Career statistics ==
As of 29 June 2025

Appearances and goals by club, season and competition
| Club | Season | League | | | National cup (Note: Includes Finnish Cup and Lithuanian Cup) | | Other | | Total | |
| Club | Season | Division | Apps | Goals | Apps | Goals | Apps | Goals | Apps | Goals |
|---|---|---|---|---|---|---|---|---|---|---|
| Diarra | 2022–23 | Malian Première Division | ? | 11 | – | | – | | ? | 11 |
| Ilves (loan) | 2023 | Veikkausliiga | 10 | 3 | 0 | 0 | 0 | 0 | 10 | 3 |
| Ilves II (loan) | 2023 | Kakkonen | 1 | 0 | – | | – | | 1 | 0 |
| Kauno Žalgiris | 2024 | A Lyga | 1 | 0 | 0 | 0 | – | | 1 | 0 |
| Kauno Žalgiris B | 2024 | I Lyga | 23 | 9 | – | | – | | 23 | 9 |
| Nevėžis (loan) | 2025 | I Lyga | 14 | 6 | 2 | 2 | – | | 16 | 8 |
| Career total | | | 49 | 29 | 2 | 2 | 0 | 0 | 51 | 31 |

== Honours ==
Ilves

- Finnish Cup: 2023

FK Kauno Žalgiris

- A Lyga: 2025
