= Vertti Hänninen =

Finnish footballer (born 2002)

Personal information
- Date of birth: 1 June 2002 (age 24)
- Place of birth: Kajaani, Finland
- Height: 1.78 m (5 ft 10 in)
- Position: Midfielder

Team information
- Current team: SJK
- Number: 17

Youth career
- –2020: RoPS

Senior career*
| Years | Team | Apps | (Gls) |
| 2018–2021 | RoPS II | 14 | (2) |
| 2021 | RoPS | 29 | (9) |
| 2022–2023 | SJK | 8 | (0) |
| 2022–2023 | SJK II | 16 | (1) |
| 2023 | → Džiugas (loan) | 2 | (0) |
| 2024– | Gnistan | 37 | (10) |
| 2026– | SJK | 3 | (0) |

International career^{‡}
| 2021 | Finland U20 | 2 | (0) |
- * Club domestic league appearances and goals as of 26 July 2026 ‡ National team caps and goals as of 18 February 2024

Vertti Hänninen (born 1 June 2002) is a Finnish professional footballer who plays as a midfielder for Veikkausliiga club SJK.

== Club career ==
Hänninen was raised in Rovaniemi and started playing football in a local club Rovaniemen Palloseura (RoPS). He made his senior debut with the club's reserve team in the fourth-tier Kolmonen in 2018.

On 13 December 2021, Hänninen signed with Veikkausliiga club Seinäjoen Jalkapallokerho (SJK), starting in the 2022 season. On 4 July 2023, he was loaned out to Džiugas Telšiai in Lithuanian A Lyga for the rest of the season, but managed to make only two league appearances for the club due to injury. After his loan deal had ended, it was announced in the end of December that Hänninen would not continue with SJK.

On 18 January 2024, Hänninen joined newly promoted Veikkausliiga club IF Gnistan. On 6 April, in the opening game of the season, he scored the winning goal in a 2–1 home win against Inter Turku, but was injured later during the match and missed the next 12 league games. On 17 February 2025, he signed a two-year contract extension.

== Career statistics ==
As of 26 July 2026

Appearances and goals by club, season and competition
| Club | Season | League | | | Cup (Note: Includes Suomen Cup) | | League cup (Note: Includes Finnish League Cup) | | Europe | | Total | |
| Club | Season | Division | Apps | Goals | Apps | Goals | Apps | Goals | Apps | Goals | Apps | Goals |
|---|---|---|---|---|---|---|---|---|---|---|---|---|
| RoPS II | 2018 | Kolmonen | 1 | 0 | – | | – | | – | | 1 | 0 |
| RoPS II | 2019 | Kakkonen | 0 | 0 | – | | – | | – | | 0 | 0 |
| RoPS II | 2020 | Kakkonen | 13 | 2 | 3 | 1 | – | | – | | 16 | 3 |
| RoPS II | 2021 | Kakkonen | 1 | 0 | – | | – | | – | | 1 | 0 |
| RoPS II | Total | | 15 | 2 | 3 | 1 | 0 | 0 | 0 | 0 | 18 | 3 |
| RoPS | 2021 | Ykkönen | 29 | 9 | 4 | 1 | – | | – | | 33 | 10 |
| SJK | 2022 | Veikkausliiga | 6 | 0 | 1 | 0 | 5 | 1 | 0 | 0 | 12 | 1 |
| SJK | 2023 | Veikkausliiga | 2 | 0 | 2 | 0 | 3 | 1 | – | | 7 | 1 |
| SJK | Total | | 8 | 0 | 3 | 0 | 8 | 2 | 0 | 0 | 19 | 2 |
| SJK Akatemia | 2022 | Ykkönen | 15 | 1 | – | | – | | – | | 15 | 1 |
| SJK Akatemia | 2023 | Ykkönen | 1 | 0 | – | | – | | – | | 1 | 0 |
| SJK Akatemia | Total | | 16 | 1 | 0 | 0 | 0 | 0 | 0 | 0 | 16 | 1 |
| Džiugas (loan) | 2023 | A Lyga | 2 | 0 | 0 | 0 | – | | – | | 2 | 0 |
| Gnistan | 2024 | Veikkausliiga | 16 | 6 | 0 | 0 | 4 | 0 | – | | 20 | 6 |
| Gnistan | 2025 | Veikkausliiga | 15 | 4 | 1 | 0 | 3 | 1 | – | | 19 | 5 |
| Gnistan | 2026 | Veikkausliiga | 6 | 0 | 1 | 0 | 5 | 0 | – | | 12 | 0 |
| Gnistan | Total | | 37 | 10 | 2 | 0 | 12 | 1 | 0 | 0 | 51 | 11 |
| SJK | 2026 | Veikkausliiga | 3 | 0 | 0 | 0 | 0 | 0 | – | | 3 | 0 |
| Career total | | | 110 | 22 | 12 | 3 | 20 | 3 | 0 | 0 | 142 | 28 |
