= Cristian Valencia =

Colombian footballer (born 1991)

Personal information
- Full name: Cristian Camilo Valencia Cífuentes
- Date of birth: 4 December 1991 (age 34)
- Place of birth: Villavicencio, Colombia
- Height: 1.85 m (6 ft 1 in)
- Position: Defender

Team information
- Current team: San Antonio Bulo Bulo
- Number: 27

Senior career*
Years	Team	Apps	(Gls)
2012–2015	Llaneros	91	(3)
2016	Cortuluá	11	(1)
2017	Llaneros	16	(1)
2017–2018	C.D. Árabe Unido	13	(2)
2018–2019	Sporting San Miguelito	49	(9)
2020	Cúcuta Deportivo	17	(0)
2021–2022	SJK	29	(4)
2023	AC Oulu	19	(0)
2024	VPS	0	(0)
2024–2025	Llaneros	30	(2)
2025–	San Antonio Bulo Bulo	14	(0)
- * Club domestic league appearances and goals as of 30 December 2025

Cristian Valencia (born 4 December 1991) is a Colombian footballer who plays as a defender for San Antonio Bulo Bulo.

== Club career ==
Valencia started to play football in his native Colombia for Llaneros. In 2016 he had a stint with Cortuluá. Next year he moved to Panama and signed with C.D. Árabe Unido.

After playing in his native Colombia ja Panama, Valencia moved to Finland and signed with Veikkausliiga club SJK Seinäjoki in 2021. On 25 October 2021, he extended his contract with SJK. On 22 April 2022, the discipline committee of Finnish FA sanctioned Valencia for a four-game ban, due to violent behaviour on Fabian Serrarens in a match against HJK on 8 April 2022. Valencia punched Serrarens in the stomach during the game. His contract with SJK was terminated on 31 May 2022.

On 23 June 2022, Valencia signed a contract with AC Oulu, still in Finland, until the end of 2023, with an option for 2024. However, for personal reasons, his arrival to Oulu was delayed until the beginning of the 2023 season. After the season, it was announced that the club will not exercise their option and Valencia will leave AC Oulu.

On 26 November 2023, Valencia was introduced as a new VPS player, signing a two-year deal with an option for an additional year. However, he terminated his contract on 16 February 2024 for personal reasons, without making a single appearance for the club.

In the early 2024, Valencia returned to Colombia and signed with his former club Llaneros F.C. in the second-tier Categoría Primera B.

== Career statistics ==
As of 23 October 2024.

Appearances and goals by club, season and competition
Club	Season	League			Cup (Note: Includes Copa Colombia and Suomen Cup)		League cup (Note: Includes Finnish League Cup)		Continental		Total	
Club	Season	Division	Apps	Goals	Apps	Goals	Apps	Goals	Apps	Goals	Apps	Goals
Llaneros	2012	Categoría Primera B	2	0	–		–		–		2	0
Llaneros	2013	Categoría Primera B	29	0	8	0	–		–		37	0
Llaneros	2014	Categoría Primera B	34	3	7	3	–		–		41	6
Llaneros	2015	Categoría Primera B	26	0	3	0	–		–		29	0
Llaneros	Total		91	3	18	3	0	0	0	0	99	6
Cortuluá	2016	Categoría Primera A	11	1	0	0	–		–		11	1
Llaneros	2017	Categoría Primera B	16	1	5	1	–		–		21	2
Árabe Unido	2017–18	Liga Panameña de Fútbol	13	2	–		–		5 (Note: Appearances in CONCACAF League)	0	18	2
Sporting San Miguelito	2018–19	Liga Panameña de Fútbol	31	5	–		–		–		31	5
Sporting San Miguelito	2019	Liga Panameña de Fútbol	18	4	–		–		–		18	4
Sporting San Miguelito	Total		49	9	0	0	0	0	0	0	49	9
Cúcuta Deportivo	2020	Categoría Primera A	17	0	1	0	–		–		18	0
SJK Seinäjoki	2021	Veikkausliiga	25	3	3	1	–		–		28	4
SJK Seinäjoki	2022	Veikkausliiga	4	1	0	0	5	1	0	0	9	2
SJK Seinäjoki	Total		29	4	3	1	5	1	0	0	37	6
AC Oulu	2023	Veikkausliiga	19	0	1	0	3	0	–		23	0
Llaneros	2024	Categoría Primera B	15	1	0	0	–		–		12	1
Career total			261	21	28	5	8	1	5	0	302	27
