= Emmanuel Patut =

Finnish footballer (born 2003)

Personal information
- Full name: Emmanuel Maker Lam Patut
- Date of birth: 19 June 2003 (age 23)
- Place of birth: Finland
- Height: 1.81 m (5 ft 11 in)
- Position: Midfielder

Team information
- Current team: IFK Mariehamn
- Number: 20

Youth career
- Jyväskylän Nousu
- 2014–2019: JJK Jyväskylä
- 2019–2022: Wolfsburg

Senior career*
Years	Team	Apps	(Gls)
2022–2023	Ilves	16	(0)
2023	Ilves II	5	(0)
2024–	IFK Mariehamn	74	(3)

International career^{‡}
2019	Finland U16	5	(0)
2019–2020	Finland U17	6	(1)
2021–2022	Finland U19	7	(0)
2021	Finland U20	2	(0)
- * Club domestic league appearances and goals as of 13 November 2026 ‡ National team caps and goals as of 8 February 2024

Emmanuel Maker Lam Patut (born 19 June 2003) is a Finnish professional footballer who plays as a midfielder for Veikkausliiga club IFK Mariehamn.

== Youth career ==
Patut played in the youth sectors of Halssilan Nousu and JJK in Jyväskylä, Finland, before signing with VfL Wolfsburg academy in Germany on 10 August 2019. He represented Wolfsburg in the 2021–22 UEFA Youth League.

== Club career ==
Patut returned to Finland after his contract with Wolfsburg expired, and signed with Veikkausliiga club Ilves on 13 August 2022.

On 1 February 2024, he signed with fellow Veikkausliiga side IFK Mariehamn. On 15 September, he scored his first goal in the league, in a 2–1 away defeat against Gnistan.

== International career ==
Patut has represented Finland at under-16, under-17, under-19 and under-20 youth international levels.

== Personal life ==
Born and raised in Finland, Patut is of South Sudanese descent.

== Career statistics ==
As of 13 November 2026

Appearances and goals by club, season and competition
Club	Season	League			Cup (Note: Includes Suomen Cup)		League cup (Note: Includes Finnish League Cup)		Europe		Total	
Club	Season	Division	Apps	Goals	Apps	Goals	Apps	Goals	Apps	Goals	Apps	Goals
Ilves	2022	Veikkausliiga	6	0	–		–		–		6	0
Ilves	2023	Veikkausliiga	10	0	5	0	1	0	–		16	0
Ilves	Total		16	0	5	0	1	0	0	0	22	0
Ilves II	2023	Kakkonen	5	0	–		–		–		5	0
IFK Mariehamn	2024	Veikkausliiga	24	1	3	0	3	0	–		30	1
IFK Mariehamn	2025	Veikkausliiga	26	1	2	0	5	0	–		33	1
IFK Mariehamn	2026	Veikkausliiga	25	1	3	0	3	1	–		31	1
IFK Mariehamn	Total		75	3	8	0	11	1	0	0	94	4
Career total			96	3	13	0	12	1	0	0	121	4

== Honours ==
=== Ilves ===
- Finnish Cup: 2023
