= Aaro Tiihonen =

Finnish footballer (born 2005)

Personal information
- Date of birth: 17 June 2005 (age 21)
- Place of birth: Rovaniemi, Finland
- Height: 1.79 m (5 ft 10 in)
- Position: Right back

Team information
- Current team: Haka
- Number: 2

Youth career
- –2020: RoPS

Senior career*
Years	Team	Apps	(Gls)
2020–2021	RoPS II	7	(1)
2022	RoPS	18	(1)
2023	AC Oulu	0	(0)
2023	→ Gnistan (loan)	7	(0)
2023	→ Gnistan II (loan)	1	(0)
2023	→ NJS (loan)	6	(0)
2024	RoPS	24	(2)
2025	SalPa	21	(0)
2026–	Haka	12	(0)

International career^{‡}
2019	Finland U15	1	(0)
2021–2022	Finland U17	7	(0)
2022–2023	Finland U18	4	(0)
Medal record
Finland U18
First place	Baltic Cup	2023
- * Club domestic league appearances and goals as of 1 November 2026 ‡ National team caps and goals as of 23 November 2023

Aaro Tiihonen (born 17 June 2005) is a Finnish professional footballer who plays as a right back for Haka in Ykkösliiga.

== Career ==
Tiihonen started to play football with a local club RoPS in Rovaniemi. At the age of 15, he made his senior debut with the club's reserve team RoPS II in the third-tier Kakkonen in 2020.

On 18 January 2023, it was announced by the Veikkausliiga club AC Oulu that they had acquired Tiihonen on a two-year deal with an option for an additional year. Immediately thereafter he was sent on loan to Ykkönen side IF Gnistan for the 2023 season. On 12 March 2024, the club announced the termination of his contract.

== International career ==
Tiihonen was part of the Finland U18 squad winning the friendly tournament Baltic Cup in June 2023.
