= 2024 Kakkonen =

Kakkonen
- Season: 2024
- Promoted: Inter Turku 2 Tampere United
- Relegated: EBK; Futura; Ilves-Kissat; JäPS 2 OPS; OTP; SexyPöxyt

The 2024 Kakkonen was the 52nd season of Kakkonen, the fourth-highest football league in Finland. The season began on 5 April and ended on 20 October 2024. It was the first season of the Kakkonen serving as the fourth-tier football league in Finland.

== Teams ==
The league consisted of thirty-one teams, split into three equal groups (A, B, and C).

=== Group A ===
| Team | Town |
|---|---|
| Atlantis 2 | Helsinki |
| Futura | Porvoo |
| GrIFK | Kauniainen |
| JäPS II | Järvenpää |
| Kiffen | Helsinki |
| MyPa | Kouvola |
| NJS | Nurmijärvi |
| PEPO | Lappeenranta |
| PPJ | Helsinki |
| Reipas | Lahti |

=== Group B ===
| Team Name | Town |
|---|---|
| EBK | Espoo |
| HJS | Hämeenlinna |
| Honka | Espoo |
| Ilves-Kissat | Tampere |
| Ilves 2 | Tampere |
| Inter Turku 2 | Kupittaa |
| Pallo-Iirot | Rauma |
| SexyPöxyt | Laaksolahti |
| Tampere United | Tampere |
| TPV | Tampere |
| VJS | Vantaa |

=== Group C ===
| Team Name | Town |
|---|---|
| GBK | Kokkola |
| JBK | Jakobstad |
| JPS | Jyväskylä |
| JS Hercules | Oulu |
| Kraft | Närpes |
| Kuopio Elo | Kuopio |
| OPS | Oulu |
| OTP | Oulu |
| SJK 2 | Seinäjoki |
| TP-47 | Tornio |

== League tables ==
=== Group A ===
| Pos | Team | Pld | W | D | L | GF | GA | GD | Pts | Qualification |
|---|---|---|---|---|---|---|---|---|---|---|
| 1 | Atlantis 2 | 18 | 10 | 2 | 6 | 33 | 26 | +7 | 32 | Qualification for Promotion Group |
| 2 | Reipas | 18 | 9 | 4 | 5 | 38 | 22 | +16 | 31 | Qualification for Promotion Group |
| 3 | Kiffen | 18 | 9 | 2 | 7 | 36 | 26 | +10 | 29 | Qualification for Promotion Group |
| 4 | PEPO | 18 | 8 | 5 | 5 | 33 | 25 | +8 | 29 | Qualification for Promotion Group |
| 5 | GrIFK | 18 | 7 | 6 | 5 | 24 | 24 | 0 | 27 | Qualification for Promotion Group |
| 6 | NJS | 18 | 6 | 8 | 4 | 28 | 24 | +4 | 26 | Qualification for Promotion Group |
| 7 | MyPa | 18 | 6 | 5 | 7 | 29 | 35 | −6 | 23 | Qualification for Relegation Group |
| 8 | PPJ | 18 | 6 | 4 | 8 | 26 | 24 | +2 | 22 | Qualification for Relegation Group |
| 9 | JäPS 2 | 18 | 6 | 2 | 10 | 25 | 39 | −14 | 20 | Qualification for Relegation Group |
| 10 | Futura | 18 | 3 | 2 | 13 | 20 | 47 | −27 | 11 | Qualification for Relegation Group |

Source: Soccerway
Rules for classification: 1) Points; 2) Goal difference; 3) Goals scored; 4) Head-to-head points; 5) Head-to-head goal difference; 6) Head-to-head goals scored; 7) Fewer away goals conceded; 8) Home goals scored; 9) Fewer home goals conceded; 10) Play-off; 11) Draw.

=== Group B ===
| Pos | Team | Pld | W | D | L | GF | GA | GD | Pts | Qualification |
|---|---|---|---|---|---|---|---|---|---|---|
| 1 | Inter Turku 2 | 20 | 15 | 2 | 3 | 71 | 28 | +43 | 47 | Qualification for Promotion Group |
| 2 | HJS | 20 | 12 | 5 | 3 | 46 | 23 | +23 | 41 | Qualification for Promotion Group |
| 3 | Tampere United | 20 | 11 | 4 | 5 | 46 | 22 | +24 | 37 | Qualification for Promotion Group |
| 4 | VJS | 20 | 10 | 5 | 5 | 45 | 28 | +17 | 35 | Qualification for Promotion Group |
| 5 | Pallo-Iirot | 20 | 11 | 1 | 8 | 46 | 33 | +13 | 34 | Qualification for Promotion Group |
| 6 | TPV | 20 | 9 | 5 | 6 | 35 | 33 | +2 | 32 | Qualification for Promotion Group |
| 7 | Honka | 20 | 6 | 6 | 8 | 34 | 38 | −4 | 24 | Qualification for Relegation Group |
| 8 | Ilves 2 | 20 | 7 | 1 | 12 | 39 | 48 | −9 | 22 | Qualification for Relegation Group |
| 9 | EBK | 20 | 5 | 2 | 13 | 27 | 64 | −37 | 17 | Qualification for Relegation Group |
| 10 | Ilves-Kissat | 20 | 5 | 1 | 14 | 31 | 68 | −37 | 16 | Qualification for Relegation Group |
| 11 | SexyPöxyt | 20 | 3 | 0 | 17 | 27 | 62 | −35 | 9 | Qualification for Relegation Group |

Source: Soccerway
Rules for classification: 1) Points; 2) Goal difference; 3) Goals scored; 4) Head-to-head points; 5) Head-to-head goal difference; 6) Head-to-head goals scored; 7) Fewer away goals conceded; 8) Home goals scored; 9) Fewer home goals conceded; 10) Play-off; 11) Draw.

=== Group C ===
| Pos | Team | Pld | W | D | L | GF | GA | GD | Pts | Qualification |
|---|---|---|---|---|---|---|---|---|---|---|
| 1 | GBK Kokkola | 18 | 14 | 0 | 4 | 49 | 31 | +18 | 42 | Qualification for Promotion Group |
| 2 | JBK | 18 | 11 | 3 | 4 | 38 | 21 | +17 | 36 | Qualification for Promotion Group |
| 3 | Kraft | 18 | 10 | 3 | 5 | 41 | 34 | +7 | 33 | Qualification for Promotion Group |
| 4 | TP-47 | 18 | 9 | 5 | 4 | 42 | 28 | +14 | 32 | Qualification for Promotion Group |
| 5 | SJK 2 | 18 | 9 | 2 | 7 | 41 | 34 | +7 | 29 | Qualification for Promotion Group |
| 6 | Kuopio Elo | 18 | 7 | 5 | 6 | 43 | 38 | +5 | 26 | Qualification for Promotion Group |
| 7 | JS Hercules | 18 | 6 | 2 | 10 | 31 | 45 | −14 | 20 | Qualification for Relegation Group |
| 8 | JPS | 18 | 4 | 5 | 9 | 34 | 31 | +3 | 17 | Qualification for Relegation Group |
| 9 | OPS | 18 | 3 | 4 | 11 | 28 | 50 | −22 | 13 | Qualification for Relegation Group |
| 10 | OTP | 18 | 2 | 1 | 15 | 19 | 54 | −35 | 7 | Qualification for Relegation Group |

Source: Soccerway
Rules for classification: 1) Points; 2) Goal difference; 3) Goals scored; 4) Head-to-head points; 5) Head-to-head goal difference; 6) Head-to-head goals scored; 7) Fewer away goals conceded; 8) Home goals scored; 9) Fewer home goals conceded; 10) Play-off; 11) Draw.

== Promotion Group ==
The top six teams in each group qualified for the Promotion Group and played each team in their group for the third time. The top two teams in each group and the top two third-placed teams advanced to the Kakkonen play-offs.

=== Group A ===
| Pos | Team | Pld | W | D | L | GF | GA | GD | Pts | Qualification |
|---|---|---|---|---|---|---|---|---|---|---|
| 1 | Reipas | 23 | 12 | 5 | 6 | 53 | 29 | +24 | 41 | Qualification for Kakkonen play-offs |
| 2 | Kiffen | 23 | 11 | 5 | 7 | 44 | 31 | +13 | 38 | Qualification for Kakkonen play-offs |
| 3 | Atlantis 2 | 23 | 11 | 2 | 10 | 38 | 40 | −2 | 35 | |
| 4 | NJS | 23 | 8 | 10 | 5 | 40 | 35 | +5 | 34 | |
| 5 | GrIFK | 23 | 9 | 7 | 7 | 36 | 32 | +4 | 34 | |
| 6 | PEPO | 23 | 9 | 6 | 8 | 39 | 38 | +1 | 33 | |

Source: Soccerway
Rules for classification: 1) Points; 2) Goal difference; 3) Goals scored; 4) Head-to-head points; 5) Head-to-head goal difference; 6) Head-to-head goals scored; 7) Fewer away goals conceded; 8) Home goals scored; 9) Fewer home goals conceded; 10) Play-off; 11) Draw.

=== Group B ===
| Pos | Team | Pld | W | D | L | GF | GA | GD | Pts | Qualification |
|---|---|---|---|---|---|---|---|---|---|---|
| 1 | Inter Turku 2 (O, P) | 25 | 18 | 4 | 3 | 86 | 33 | +53 | 58 | Qualification for Kakkonen play-offs |
| 2 | HJS | 25 | 15 | 5 | 5 | 52 | 27 | +25 | 50 | Qualification for Kakkonen play-offs |
| 3 | Tampere United (O, P) | 25 | 14 | 5 | 6 | 57 | 28 | +29 | 47 | Qualification for Kakkonen play-offs |
| 4 | VJS | 25 | 11 | 8 | 6 | 53 | 35 | +18 | 41 | |
| 5 | TPV | 25 | 10 | 6 | 9 | 40 | 49 | −9 | 36 | |
| 6 | Pallo-Iirot | 25 | 11 | 2 | 12 | 51 | 45 | +6 | 35 | |

Source: Soccerway
Rules for classification: 1) Points; 2) Goal difference; 3) Goals scored; 4) Head-to-head points; 5) Head-to-head goal difference; 6) Head-to-head goals scored; 7) Fewer away goals conceded; 8) Home goals scored; 9) Fewer home goals conceded; 10) Play-off; 11) Draw.
(O) Play-off winners; (P) Promoted

=== Group C ===
| Pos | Team | Pld | W | D | L | GF | GA | GD | Pts | Qualification |
|---|---|---|---|---|---|---|---|---|---|---|
| 1 | GBK Kokkola | 23 | 16 | 1 | 6 | 65 | 41 | +24 | 49 | Qualification for Kakkonen play-offs |
| 2 | JBK | 23 | 15 | 3 | 5 | 48 | 31 | +17 | 48 | Qualification for Kakkonen play-offs |
| 3 | SJK 2 | 23 | 13 | 2 | 8 | 63 | 42 | +21 | 41 | Qualification for Kakkonen play-offs |
| 4 | Kraft | 23 | 12 | 3 | 8 | 53 | 49 | +4 | 39 | |
| 5 | TP-47 | 23 | 11 | 5 | 7 | 56 | 51 | +5 | 38 | |
| 6 | Kuopio Elo | 23 | 7 | 6 | 10 | 53 | 56 | −3 | 27 | |

Source: Soccerway
Rules for classification: 1) Points; 2) Goal difference; 3) Goals scored; 4) Head-to-head points; 5) Head-to-head goal difference; 6) Head-to-head goals scored; 7) Fewer away goals conceded; 8) Home goals scored; 9) Fewer home goals conceded; 10) Play-off; 11) Draw.

== Relegation Group ==
The bottom four teams in Groups A and C, and bottom five teams in Group B, qualified for the Relegation Group and played each team in their group for the third time. The bottom two teams in Groups A and C, and the bottom three teams in Group B, were relegated to the 2025 Kolomonen.

=== Group A ===
| Pos | Team | Pld | W | D | L | GF | GA | GD | Pts | Relegation |
|---|---|---|---|---|---|---|---|---|---|---|
| 1 | MyPa | 24 | 10 | 5 | 9 | 37 | 41 | −4 | 35 | |
| 2 | PPJ | 24 | 9 | 5 | 10 | 40 | 31 | +9 | 32 | |
| 3 | JäPS 2 (R) | 24 | 7 | 2 | 15 | 34 | 57 | −23 | 23 | Relegation to Kolmonen |
| 4 | Futura (R) | 24 | 6 | 3 | 15 | 29 | 56 | −27 | 21 | Relegation to Kolmonen |

Source: Soccerway
Rules for classification: 1) Points; 2) Goal difference; 3) Goals scored; 4) Head-to-head points; 5) Head-to-head goal difference; 6) Head-to-head goals scored; 7) Fewer away goals conceded; 8) Home goals scored; 9) Fewer home goals conceded; 10) Play-off; 11) Draw.
(R) Relegated

=== Group B ===
| Pos | Team | Pld | W | D | L | GF | GA | GD | Pts | Relegation |
|---|---|---|---|---|---|---|---|---|---|---|
| 1 | Ilves 2 | 24 | 9 | 3 | 12 | 50 | 54 | −4 | 30 | |
| 2 | Honka | 24 | 8 | 6 | 10 | 43 | 48 | −5 | 30 | |
| 3 | EBK (R) | 24 | 8 | 3 | 13 | 40 | 68 | −28 | 27 | Relegation to Kolmonen |
| 4 | Ilves-Kissat (R) | 24 | 5 | 1 | 18 | 35 | 81 | −46 | 16 | Relegation to Kolmonen |
| 5 | SexyPöxyt (R) | 24 | 4 | 1 | 19 | 32 | 71 | −39 | 13 | Relegation to Kolmonen |

Source: Soccerway
Rules for classification: 1) Points; 2) Goal difference; 3) Goals scored; 4) Head-to-head points; 5) Head-to-head goal difference; 6) Head-to-head goals scored; 7) Fewer away goals conceded; 8) Home goals scored; 9) Fewer home goals conceded; 10) Play-off; 11) Draw.
(R) Relegated

=== Group C ===
| Pos | Team | Pld | W | D | L | GF | GA | GD | Pts | Relegation |
|---|---|---|---|---|---|---|---|---|---|---|
| 1 | JS Hercules | 24 | 11 | 2 | 11 | 62 | 53 | +9 | 35 | |
| 2 | JPS | 24 | 8 | 5 | 11 | 46 | 52 | −6 | 29 | |
| 3 | OPS (R) | 24 | 4 | 4 | 16 | 40 | 69 | −29 | 16 | Relegation to Kolmonen |
| 4 | OTP (R) | 24 | 4 | 1 | 19 | 27 | 69 | −42 | 13 | Relegation to Kolmonen |

Source: Soccerway
Rules for classification: 1) Points; 2) Goal difference; 3) Goals scored; 4) Head-to-head points; 5) Head-to-head goal difference; 6) Head-to-head goals scored; 7) Fewer away goals conceded; 8) Home goals scored; 9) Fewer home goals conceded; 10) Play-off; 11) Draw.
(R) Relegated

== Kakkonen play-offs ==
=== Semi-finals ===
==== First leg ====
| 28 September 2024 | HJS (2nd, Group B) | 1–1 | Reipas (1st, Group A) |

| 28 September 2024 | Kiffen (2nd, Group A) | 0–0 | JBK (2nd, Group C) |

| 29 September 2024 | SJK 2 (3rd, Group C) | 3–1 | Inter Turku 2 (1st, Group B) |

| 29 September 2024 | Tampere United (3rd, Group B) | 2–1 | GBK Kokkola (1st, Group C) |

==== Second leg ====
| 5 October 2024 | Inter Turku 2 (1st, Group B) | 6–1 (7–4 agg.) | SJK 2 (3rd, Group C) |

| 5 October 2024 | JBK (2nd, Group C) | 1–4 (1–4 agg.) | Kiffen (2nd, Group A) |

| 5 October 2024 | Reipas (1st, Group A) | 0–1 (1–2 agg.) | HJS (2nd, Group B) |

| 6 October 2024 | GBK Kokkola (1st, Group C) | 1–1 (2–3 agg.) | Tampere United (3rd, Group B) |

=== Finals ===
==== First leg ====
| 12 October 2024 | HJS (2nd, Group B) | 3–1 | Tampere United (3rd, Group B) |

| 14 October 2024 | Kiffen (2nd, Group A) | 0–3 | Inter Turku 2 (1st, Group B) |

==== Second leg ====
| 20 October 2024 | Inter Turku 2 (1st, Group B) | 4–0 (7–0 agg.) | Kiffen (2nd, Group A) |

| 20 October 2024 | Tampere United (3rd, Group B) | 3–1 (a.e.t.) (4–4 agg.) (4–3 p) | HJS (2nd, Group B) |
