= Niklas Orjala =

Finnish footballer (born 2004)

Personal information
- Date of birth: 30 July 2004 (age 22)
- Place of birth: Helsinki, Finland
- Height: 1.79 m (5 ft 10 in)
- Position: Left back

Youth career
- –2016: NJS
- 2017–2022: KuPS

Senior career*
Years	Team	Apps	(Gls)
2021	KuFu-98	15	(1)
2022	KuPS	0	(0)
2022	KuPS II	14	(2)
2023	MP	18	(0)
2024	AC Oulu	7	(0)
2024	→ OLS (loan)	13	(1)

International career
2022	Finland U18	1	(0)
- * Club domestic league appearances and goals as of 19 October 2024

Niklas Orjala (born 30 July 2004) is a Finnish professional footballer who plays as a left back.

== Career ==
Orjala started to play football in Nurmijärven Jalkapalloseura (NJS), before joining the youth sector of Kuopion Palloseura (KuPS) in 2017. Orjala started his senior career in 2021 with KuFu-98, KuPS reserve team, in the third-tier Kakkonen. He made one appearance with KuPS first team, debuting on 29 January 2022 in a Finnish League Cup win against Vaasan Palloseura (VPS).

Orjala signed with Mikkelin Palloilijat (MP) in second-tier Ykkönen for the 2023 season.

On 17 November 2023, Orjala signed a two-year deal with the Veikkausliiga club AC Oulu, with an option for an additional year. His contract with Oulu was terminated in January 2025.

== Career statistics ==
As of 23 October 2024.

Appearances and goals by club, season and competition
Club	Season	League			Cup (Note: Includes Suomen Cup)		League cup (Note: Includes Finnish League Cup)		Europe		Total	
Club	Season	Division	Apps	Goals	Apps	Goals	Apps	Goals	Apps	Goals	Apps	Goals
KuFu-98	2021	Kakkonen	15	1	–		–		–		15	1
KuPS	2022	Veikkausliiga	0	0	0	0	1	0	0	0	1	0
KuPS Akatemia	2022	Kakkonen	14	2	–		–		–		14	1
MP	2023	Ykkönen	18	0	2	0	2	0	–		22	0
AC Oulu	2024	Veikkausliiga	7	0	3	0	1	0	–		11	0
OLS (loan)	2024	Ykkönen	13	1	–		–		–		13	1
Career total			67	4	5	0	4	0	0	0	76	4
