= Aatu Hakala =

Finnish footballer (born 2000)

Personal information
- Full name: Aatu Aabraham Hakala
- Date of birth: 28 July 2000 (age 26)
- Place of birth: Vantaa, Finland
- Height: 1.84 m (6 ft 0 in)
- Position: Goalkeeper

Team information
- Current team: Lahti
- Number: 12

Youth career
- 2007–2012: TiPS
- 2013–2014: KOPSE

Senior career*
Years	Team	Apps	(Gls)
2015–2017	Legirus Inter	17	(0)
2017	TiPS	16	(0)
2018–2020	Gnistan	51	(0)
2021–2023	Haka	58	(0)
2024–2025	KuPS	9	(0)
2026–	Lahti	3	(0)
- * Club domestic league appearances and goals as of 13 November 2026

Aatu Aabraham Hakala (born 28 July 2000) is a Finnish professional footballer who plays as a goalkeeper for Veikkausliiga club Lahti.

== Career ==
Hakala played in Legirus Inter and Tikkurilan Palloseura (TiPS) as a junior in lower divisions in Vantaa, before joining Gnistan in third-tier level Kakkonen in 2018.

Hakala joined FC Haka in Valkeakoski for the 2021 season and managed to establish his place as a first-choice goalkeeper of the team in the league.

After three seasons with Haka, he transferred to fellow Veikkausliiga club KuPS in Kuopio on 14 November 2023, on a two-year deal, starting in 2024.

== Career statistics ==
As of 20 August 2025

Appearances and goals by club, season and competition
Club	Season	League			National cup (Note: Includes Suomen Cup)		League cup (Note: Includes Regions Cup and Finnish League Cup)		Europe		Total	
Club	Season	Division	Apps	Goals	Apps	Goals	Apps	Goals	Apps	Goals	Apps	Goals
Legirus Inter	2015	Nelonen	6	0	–		–		–		6	0
Legirus Inter	2016	Kolmonen	11	0	1	0	3	0	–		15	0
Legirus Inter	2017	Kakkonen	0	0	1	0	–		–		1	0
Legirus Inter	Total		17	0	2	0	3	0	0	0	22	0
TiPS	2017	Kolmonen	16	0	–		2	0	–		18	0
Gnistan	2018	Kakkonen	21	0	5	0	–		–		26	0
Gnistan	2019	Kakkonen	21	0	6	0	–		–		27	0
Gnistan	2020	Ykkönen	9	0	2	0	–		–		11	0
Gnistan	Total		51	0	13	0	0	0	0	0	64	0
Haka	2021	Veikkausliiga	8	0	0	0	–		–		8	0
Haka	2022	Veikkausliiga	26	0	0	0	4	0	–		30	0
Haka	2023	Veikkausliiga	24	0	0	0	5	0	2 (Note: Appearances in UEFA Conference League)	0	29	0
Haka	Total		58	0	0	0	9	0	2	0	69	0
KuPS	2024	Veikkausliiga	4	0	2	0	3	0	0	0	9	0
KuPS	2025	Veikkausliiga	4	0	2	0	2	0	2 (Note: Appearances in UEFA Champions League and UEFA Europa League)	0	10	0
KuPS	Total		8	0	4	0	5	0	2	0	19	0
KuPS Akatemia	2025	Ykkönen	1	0	–		–		–		1	0
Career total			151	0	19	0	19	0	4	0	193	0

== Honours ==
Gnistan

- Kakkonen Group B: 2019

KuPS

- Veikkausliiga: 2024
- Finnish Cup: 2024
