= Matias Riikonen =

Finnish footballer (born 2002)

Personal information
- Full name: Matias Ilmari Riikonen
- Date of birth: 24 February 2002 (age 24)
- Height: 1.86 m (6 ft 1 in)
- Position: Goalkeeper

Team information
- Current team: IFK Mariehamn
- Number: 32

Youth career
- –2018: MYPA
- 2020–2021: → Copenhagen (loan)

Senior career*
Years	Team	Apps	(Gls)
2018	MYPA	3	(0)
2018–2021	Ilves II	26	(0)
2018–2021	Ilves	6	(0)
2022–2023	Inter Turku	12	(0)
2024–	IFK Mariehamn	49	(0)

International career^{‡}
2019	Finland U17	2	(0)
2021–	Finland U20	1	(0)
- * Club domestic league appearances and goals as of 1 November 2026 ‡ National team caps and goals as of 14 November 2021

Matias Ilmari Riikonen (born 24 February 2002) is a Finnish footballer who plays as a goalkeeper for Veikkausliiga side IFK Mariehamn.

== Club career ==
On 22 September 2020, Riikonen joined the U19 side of Danish Superliga club Copenhagen on a season-long loan deal from Ilves.

On 26 November 2021, he signed a two-year contract with Inter Turku.

On 22 November 2023, Riikonen signed a two-year deal with fellow Veikkausliiga club IFK Mariehamn.

== Career statistics ==
As of 13 November 2026

Club	Season	League			Cup (Note: Appearances in the Suomen Cup)		League cup (Note: Includes Finnish League Cup)		Europe		Total	
Club	Season	Division	Apps	Goals	Apps	Goals	Apps	Goals	Apps	Goals	Apps	Goals
MYPA	2018	Kakkonen	3	0	0	0	–		–		3	0
Ilves II	2018	Kakkonen	0	0	–		–		–		0	0
Ilves II	2019	Kakkonen	18	0	–		–		–		18	0
Ilves II	2020	Kakkonen	2	0	–		–		–		2	0
Ilves II	2021	Kakkonen	5	0	–		–		–		5	0
Ilves II	Total		25	0	0	0	0	0	0	0	25	0
Ilves	2020	Veikkausliiga	6	0	1	0	–		0	0	7	0
Ilves	2021	Veikkausliiga	0	0	0	0	–		–		0	0
Ilves	Total		6	0	1	0	0	0	0	0	7	0
Inter Turku	2022	Veikkausliiga	9	0	5	0	5	0	2 (Note: Includes UEFA Europa Conference League)	0	21	0
Inter Turku	2023	Veikkausliiga	3	0	3	0	4	0	–		10	0
Inter Turku	Total		12	0	8	0	9	0	2	0	31	0
IFK Mariehamn	2024	Veikkausliiga	27	0	0	0	4	0	–		31	0
IFK Mariehamn	2025	Veikkausliiga	14	0	0	0	3	0	–		17	0
IFK Mariehamn	2026	Veikkausliiga	8	0	1	0	4	0	–		13	0
IFK Mariehamn	Total		49	0	1	0	11	0	0	0	61	0
Career total			95	0	11	0	20	0	2	0	128	0
