= Elias Collin =

Finnish footballer (born 2003)

Personal information
- Date of birth: 12 September 2003 (age 23)
- Place of birth: Nurmijärvi, Finland
- Height: 1.77 m (5 ft 10 in)
- Position: Left back

Team information
- Current team: TPS
- Number: 3

Youth career
- –2019: NJS
- 2020: KäPa

Senior career*
| Years | Team | Apps | (Gls) |
| 2019 | NJS II | 1 | (0) |
| 2021 | KäPa | 20 | (0) |
| 2022 | Haka II | 3 | (0) |
| 2022 | Haka | 13 | (0) |
| 2023 | OLS | 9 | (1) |
| 2023 | AC Oulu | 9 | (0) |
| 2024– | TPS | 21 | (0) |

International career^{‡}
| 2021 | Finland U19 | 1 | (0) |
- * Club domestic league appearances and goals as of 23 November 2025 ‡ National team caps and goals as of 19 February 2024

Elias Collin (born 12 September 2003) is a Finnish professional footballer who plays as a left back for Ykkösliiga club TPS.

== Club career ==
On 7 January 2022, Collin signed with Veikkausliiga club FC Haka.

He switched teams for the next 2023 Veikkausliiga season, and signed with AC Oulu on 8 November 2022.

On 20 December 2023, it was announced that Collin had signed a two-year deal with Turun Palloseura (TPS), competing in the new second tier Ykkösliiga.
