= Esbo Bollklubb =

Finnish football club

- Full name: Esbo Bollklubb
- Nickname: EBK
- Founded: 1940
- Ground: Keski-Espoon Urheilukeskus; Espoo; Finland
- Chairman: Juha Pylkkö
- Coach: Xhevdet Gela
- League: Kolmonen
- 2026: Kakkonen Group B, 9th of 10 (relegated)
Home colours	Away colours

Esbo Bollklubb (EBK) is a Finnish football club based in Espoo. Founded in 1940, the men's team currently competes in the Finnish fourth tier Kakkonen. EBK is Espoo's oldest football team. EBK also has a women's team that currently competes in the Finnish second tier Kansallinen Ykkönen.

== History ==
In the past the club participated in more sports, but in recent years has specialised in football. At its pinnacle the men's team played in the Kakkonen in the years 1989–91, before returning back in 2024 and 2026. The women's team played in women's SM-series in 1993 and 1994. EBK caters for a range of age groups for boys and girls teams.

The club's greatest competitive success was in the Finnish Cup in 1995.

== Season to season ==
Season	Level	Division	Section	Administration	Position	Movements
1993	Tier 4	Kolmonen (Third Division)	Section 2	Helsinki & Uusimaa (SPL Helsinki)	12th	Relegated
1994	Tier 5	Nelonen (Fourth Division)	Group 3	Helsinki & Uusimaa (SPL Helsinki)	1st	Promoted
1995	Tier 4	Kolmonen (Third Division)	Section 1	Helsinki & Uusimaa (SPL Helsinki)	5th	
1996	Tier 4	Kolmonen (Third Division)	Section 2	Helsinki & Uusimaa (SPL Helsinki)	3rd	
1997	Tier 4	Kolmonen (Third Division)	Section 1	Helsinki & Uusimaa (SPL Helsinki)	5th	
1998	Tier 4	Kolmonen (Third Division)	Section 1	Helsinki & Uusimaa (SPL Helsinki)	7th	
1999	Tier 4	Kolmonen (Third Division)	Section 1	Helsinki & Uusimaa (SPL Helsinki)	7th	
2000	Tier 4	Kolmonen (Third Division)	Section 1	Helsinki & Uusimaa (SPL Helsinki)	8th	
2001	Tier 4	Kolmonen (Third Division)	Section 1	Helsinki & Uusimaa (SPL Uusimaa)	4th	
2002	Tier 4	Kolmonen (Third Division)	Section 2	Helsinki & Uusimaa (SPL Uusimaa)	1st	Play-offs
2003	Tier 4	Kolmonen (Third Division)	Section 1	Helsinki & Uusimaa (SPL Uusimaa)	4th	
2004	Tier 4	Kolmonen (Third Division)	Section 1	Helsinki & Uusimaa (SPL Uusimaa)	4th	
2005	Tier 4	Kolmonen (Third Division)	Section 1	Helsinki & Uusimaa (SPL Uusimaa)	4th	
2006	Tier 4	Kolmonen (Third Division)	Section 1	Helsinki & Uusimaa (SPL Uusimaa)	4th	
2007	Tier 4	Kolmonen (Third Division)	Section 1	Helsinki & Uusimaa (SPL Uusimaa)	10th	
2008	Tier 4	Kolmonen (Third Division)	Section 1	Helsinki & Uusimaa (SPL Uusimaa)	3rd	
2009	Tier 4	Kolmonen (Third Division)	Section 1	Helsinki & Uusimaa (SPL Uusimaa)	2nd	
2010	Tier 4	Kolmonen (Third Division)	Section 1	Helsinki & Uusimaa (SPL Uusimaa)	7th	
2011	Tier 5	Nelonen (Fourth Division)	Group 1	Uusimaa (SPL Uusimaa)	2nd	
2012	Tier 5	Nelonen (Fourth Division)	Group 1	Uusimaa (SPL Uusimaa)	1st	Promoted
2013	Tier 4	Kolmonen (Third Division)	Group 2	Helsinki & Uusimaa (SPL Uusimaa)	9th	
2014	Tier 4	Kolmonen (Third Division)	Group 1	Helsinki & Uusimaa (SPL Uusimaa)	11th	Relegated
2015	Tier 5	Nelonen (Fourth Division)	Group 1	Uusimaa (SPL Uusimaa)	5th	
2016	Tier 5	Nelonen (Fourth Division)	Group 1	Uusimaa (SPL Uusimaa)	2nd	Promotion Playoff
2017	Tier 5	Nelonen (Fourth Division)	Group 2	Uusimaa (SPL Uusimaa)	7th	
2018	Tier 5	Nelonen (Fourth Division)	Group 1	Uusimaa (SPL Uusimaa)	10th	Relegated
2019	Tier 6	Vitonen (Fifth Division)	Group 2	South (SPL Etelä)	1st	Promoted
2020	Tier 5	Nelonen (Fourth Division)	Group 1	South (SPL Etelä)	1st	Promoted
2021	Tier 4	Kolmonen (Third Division)	Group A	South (SPL Etelä)	2nd	
2022	Tier 4	Kolmonen (Third Division)	Group A	South (SPL Etelä)	4th	
2023	Tier 4	Kolmonen (Third Division)	Group A	South (SPL Etelä)	1st	Promoted
2024	Tier 4	Kakkonen (Second Division)	Group B	Finnish FA (Suomen Palloliitto)	9th	Relegated
2025	Tier 5	Kolmonen (Third Division)	Group A	South (SPL Etelä)	1st	Promoted
2026	Tier 4	Kakkonen (Second Division)	Group B	Finnish FA (Suomen Palloliitto)		

== 2026 season ==
For the 2026 season EBK competes in Kakkonen Group B. This is the fourth highest tier in the Finnish football system.

== EBK's presidents ==
- Tor Petrell (1940)
- Alf Lindholm (1941–45)
- Torsten Rein (1946)
- Nils-Erik Ekman (1947–48)
- Karl Weckström (1949)
- Nils-Erik Ekman (1950)
- Tor Petrell (1951–52)
- Lars Schönberg (1953)
- Balder Weckström (1954)
- Georg Cederqvist (1955–63)
- Stig Hasselström (1964–67)
- Lars Holmberg (1968)
- Rolf Mattsson (1969–75)
- Arto Nikulainen (1976)
- Leif Kumlin (1977–78)
- Lars Lakanen (1979–82)
- Pål-Olof Björklund (1983–85)
- Mauri Salonen (1986–89)
- Håkan Sundström (1990–92)
- Tapio Kortelainen (1993)
- Hannu Hirvonen (1994)
- Esa Martonen (1995–97)
- Erkki Lavanti (1998–00)
- Jukka Serpola (2001)
- Jaana Antikainen (2002)
- Matti Kumpulainen (2003–)
