= Otto Hautamo =

Finnish footballer (born 2002)

Personal information
- Date of birth: 7 March 2002 (age 24)
- Place of birth: Finland
- Height: 1.87 m (6 ft 2 in)
- Position: Goalkeeper

Youth career
- –2014: KäPa
- 2015–2016: PK Keski-Uusimaa
- 2017–2020: HJK

Senior career*
Years	Team	Apps	(Gls)
2018–2020	Klubi 04	0	(0)
2020–2021	MP	2	(0)
2022–2023	Åland	16	(0)
2022–2023	IFK Mariehamn	6	(0)
2024	KäPa	11	(0)
- * Club domestic league appearances and goals as of 21 October 2024

Otto Hautamo (born 7 March 2002) is a Finnish professional footballer who plays as a goalkeeper.

== Club career ==
After playing with HJK organisation and with Mikkelin Palloilijat (MP) in second tier Ykkönen, Hautamo signed with Veikkausliiga club IFK Mariehamn, starting in 2022 season. On 27 May 2023, Hautamo made his league debut against his former club HJK, when he was named in the starting line-up after the first-choice goalkeeper Elmo Henriksson was sidelined against his parent club. Hautamo kept a clean sheet in the match, helping his side get a 0–0 draw. During the season, he made six league appearances in total.

On 25 January 2024, Hautamo signed with his former club Käpylän Pallo (KäPa), competing in the new second tier Ykkösliiga.
