= Onni Suutari =

Finnish footballer (born 2003)

Personal information
- Date of birth: 29 April 2003 (age 23)
- Place of birth: Raahe, Finland
- Height: 1.90 m (6 ft 3 in)
- Position: Forward

Team information
- Current team: RoPS
- Number: 9

Youth career
- –2018: FC Raahe
- 2018–2020: OLS

Senior career*
Years	Team	Apps	(Gls)
2020–2024	OLS	40	(13)
2021–2024	AC Oulu	37	(2)
2022	→ Gnistan (loan)	9	(0)
2024	→ Tallinna Kalev (loan)	19	(2)
2025	OLS	26	(17)
2026–	RoPS	26	(13)

International career^{‡}
2024	Finland U21	2	(0)
- * Club domestic league appearances and goals as of 20 October 2026 ‡ National team caps and goals as of 9 June 2024

Onni Suutari (born 29 April 2003) is a Finnish professional footballer who plays as a forward for Ykkönen club RoPS.

== Club career ==
=== OLS ===
Born in Raahe, Suutari started playing football with a local club FC Raahe. He moved to Oulu in 2018 to join Oulun Luistinseura (OLS) youth sector in AC Oulu organisation, and made his senior debut with the reserve team OLS in the third-tier Kakkonen in 2020.

=== AC Oulu ===
Suutari debuted in Veikkausliiga with AC Oulu first team in the 2021 season, and scored his first league goal on 28 May 2022, a winning goal in a 1–0 home win against SJK. On 6 June 2022, he extended his deal with the club until the end of 2024.

==== Gnistan (loan) ====
On 29 July 2022, Suutari was loaned out to IF Gnistan in the second-tier Ykkönen for the rest of the 2022 season.

==== Tallinna Kalev (loan) ====
On 1 March 2024, Suutari was loaned out to Estonian Meistriliiga club Tallinna Kalev until July 2024. Two days later, he scored a goal in his debut, in a 1–1 draw against JK Tammeka.

== Career statistics ==
As of 27 July 2026

Appearances and goals by club, season and competition
Club	Season	League			Cup (Note: Includes Suomen Cup and Estonian Cup)		League cup (Note: Includes Kakkonen Cup and Finnish League Cup)		Europe		Total	
Club	Season	Division	Apps	Goals	Apps	Goals	Apps	Goals	Apps	Goals	Apps	Goals
OLS	2020	Kakkonen	9	1	0	0	—		—		9	1
OLS	2021	Kakkonen	22	5	0	0	2	1	—		24	6
OLS	2024	Ykkönen	9	7	—		—		—		9	7
OLS	Total		40	13	0	0	2	1	–	–	42	14
AC Oulu	2021	Veikkausliiga	1	0	0	0	—		—		1	0
AC Oulu	2022	Veikkausliiga	14	1	4	4	3	0	—		21	5
AC Oulu	2023	Veikkausliiga	22	1	5	1	7	1	—		34	3
AC Oulu	2024	Veikkausliiga	0	0	0	0	2	0	—		2	0
AC Oulu	Total		37	2	9	5	12	1	–	–	58	8
Gnistan (loan)	2022	Ykkönen	9	0	—		—		—		9	0
Tallinna Kalev (loan)	2024	Meistriliiga	19	2	1	0	—		1 (Note: Includes UEFA Conference League)	0	21	2
Tallinna Kalev II (loan)	2024	Esiliiga	1	2	—		—		—		1	2
OLS	2025	Ykkönen	28	17	3	1	–		–		31	18
RoPS	2026	Ykkönen	15	6	1	0	–		–		16	6
Career total			147	42	14	6	14	2	1	0	176	50

== Honours ==
AC Oulu

- Finnish League Cup runner-up: 2023
