= Roope Paunio =

Finnish footballer (born 2002)

Personal information
- Date of birth: 14 December 2002 (age 23)
- Place of birth: Espoo, Finland
- Height: 1.90 m (6 ft 3 in)
- Position: Goalkeeper

Team information
- Current team: SJK
- Number: 1

Youth career
- –2018: Honka

Senior career*
Years	Team	Apps	(Gls)
2018–2023	Honka II	57	(0)
2021–2023	Honka	5	(0)
2024–	SJK	75	(0)

International career^{‡}
2018	Finland U16	2	(0)
2019	Finland U17	1	(0)
2025–	Finland U21	1	(0)
- * Club domestic league appearances and goals as of 13 November 2026 ‡ National team caps and goals as of 25 March 2025

Roope Paunio (born 14 December 2002) is a Finnish professional footballer who plays as a goalkeeper for Veikkausliiga club SJK.

== Club career ==
Paunio spent his early years with FC Honka youth sector.

He represented Honka until the end of 2023 Veikkausliiga season, when Honka was suddenly declared for bankruptcy and he was released. During 2020–2023, Paunio played in five Veikkausliiga matches with Honka first team, and additionally made 57 appearances with the club's reserve team in third tier Kakkonen.

On 20 November 2023, fellow Veikkausliiga club SJK announced the signing of Paunio on a two-year deal with a one-year option. Paunio started the season as the team's first-choice goalkeeper.

== International career ==
Paunio has played for Finland at under-U16 and under-U17 youth international levels. On 25 March 2025, he made his debut for the Finland U21 national team, in a friendly win against Slovenia.

== Personal life ==
His older brother Atte is also a football goalkeeper who plays at an amateur level in Finland.

== Career statistics ==
As of 13 November 2026

Appearances and goals by club, season and competition
Club	Season	League			National cup (Note: Includes Suomen Cup)		League cup (Note: Includes Kakkonen Cup and Finnish League Cup)		Europe		Total	
Club	Season	Division	Apps	Goals	Apps	Goals	Apps	Goals	Apps	Goals	Apps	Goals
Honka Akatemia	2018	Kakkonen	1	0	—		—		—		1	0
Honka Akatemia	2019	Kakkonen	6	0	—		2	0	—		8	0
Honka Akatemia	2020	Kakkonen	17	0	—		2	0	—		19	0
Honka Akatemia	2021	Kakkonen	17	0	—		—		—		17	0
Honka Akatemia	2022	Kakkonen	10	0	—		—		—		10	0
Honka Akatemia	2023	Kakkonen	6	0	—		—		—		6	0
Honka Akatemia	Total		57	0	0	0	4	0	0	0	61	0
Honka	2021	Veikkausliiga	2	0	0	0	–		0	0	2	0
Honka	2022	Veikkausliiga	1	0	1	0	2	0	—		4	0
Honka	2023	Veikkausliiga	2	0	3	0	1	0	0	0	6	0
Honka	Total		5	0	4	0	3	0	0	0	12	0
SJK	2024	Veikkausliiga	24	0	4	0	3	0	—		31	0
SJK	2025	Veikkausliiga	28	0	0	0	3	0	2 (Note: Appearances in UEFA Conference League)	0	33	0
SJK	2026	Veikkausliiga	23	0	2	0	2	0	—		27	0
SJK	Total		75	0	6	0	8	0	2	0	91	0
Career total			147	0	10	0	15	0	2	0	174	0

== Honours ==
=== Honka ===
- Finnish Cup runner-up: 2023
- Finnish League Cup: 2022
