= Onni Viljamaa =

Finnish footballer (born 2004)

Personal information
- Date of birth: 30 April 2004 (age 22)
- Place of birth: Helsinki, Finland
- Height: 1.86 m (6 ft 1 in)
- Position: Left winger

Youth career
- –2021: KäPa

Senior career*
Years	Team	Apps	(Gls)
2022	KäPa	23	(5)
2023–2024	KuPS	1	(0)
2023–2024	KuPS II	1	(0)
2023	→ KäPa (loan)	7	(0)
2024	Honka	1	(0)

International career^{‡}
2019	Finland U16	4	(1)
2022	Finland U18	5	(0)
- * Club domestic league appearances and goals as of 13 October 2024 ‡ National team caps and goals as of 21 July 2024

Onni Viljaa (born 30 April 2004) is a Finnish professional football player who plays as a left winger.
