= HJS Akatemia =

Finnish football club

HJS
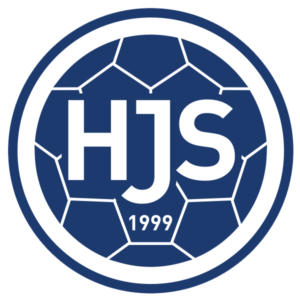
- Full name: Hämeenlinnan Jalkapalloseura
- Founded: 2015; 11 years ago
- Ground: Kaurialan kenttä
- Capacity: 1,500
- Chairman: Olli Lehtimäki
- Manager: Lauri Hakanen
- League: Kakkonen
- 2026: Kakkonen Group B, 6th of 10
- Website: hjs.fi
Home colours	Away colours

Hämeenlinnan Jalkapalloseura, abbreviated as HJS, is a football club from Hämeenlinna, Finland. Their home ground is Kaurialan kenttä. The men's football first team currently plays in the Kakkonen (the third highest level of football in Finland).

The clud previously used the name HJS Akatemia, but since 2021, it is known only as HJS, abbreviated from Hämeenlinnan Jalkapalloseura.

== Current squad ==
As of 17 September 2020

Note: Flags indicate national team as defined under FIFA eligibility rules; some limited exceptions apply. Players may hold more than one non-FIFA nationality.

No.	Pos.	Nation	Player
1	GK	FIN	Eero Viljanen
2	DF	COD	Giscard Mosamete
3	DF	FIN	Gaaid Abdi
4	DF	FIN	Eppu Kallio
5	MF	FIN	Lasse Kivinen
6	DF	FIN	Roope Huhtala
7	FW	FIN	Jesse Huhtala
8	MF	FIN	Valtteri Kaarna
9	FW	FIN	Santeri Stenius
10	MF	FIN	Prince Mokuma
11	FW	FIN	Eero Lamberg
12	FW	FIN	Joona Miekka
13	DF	FIN	Paavo Ahola
14	FW	FIN	Miika Paussu
15	MF	FIN	Lauri Hakanen

No.	Pos.	Nation	Player
16	DF	FIN	Valtteri Paananen
17	FW	FIN	Joona Dyster
18	MF	FIN	Kasimir Arminen
19	FW	FIN	Mikko Kalervo
19	FW	FIN	Leevi Ahola
20	FW	FIN	Santeri Korpela
21	FW	FIN	Arttu Raittinen
23	FW	FIN	Timo Viljanen
24	MF	FIN	Juuso Kemppainen
25	FW	FIN	Azina Alingue
26	DF	FIN	Elmeri Supperi
28	FW	FIN	Ossi Lehtonen
31	GK	FIN	Valtteri Lähde
31	GK	FIN	Jussi-Pekka Lana
70	GK	FIN	Miika Santamäki
—	MF	FIN	Topi Ala

=== Management ===
As of 17 September 2020

Name	Role
(Finland) Lauri Hakanen	Head Coach
(Finland) Teuvo Palkki	Coach
(Finland) Jaakko Puronaho	Coach / Masseur
(Finland) Jari Markkula	Kit Manager
(Finland) Markku Kannisto	Kit Manager
(Finland) Perttu Urponen	Team Manager

== Season to season ==
Season to season of HJS

Season	Level	Division	Section	Administration	Position	
2016	Tier 5	Nelonen (Fourth Division)		Tampere District (SPL Tampere)	1st	Promoted. HJS Akatemia
2017	Tier 4	Kolmonen (Third Division)		Tampere District (SPL Tampere)	1st	Promoted. HJS Akatemia
2018	Tier 3	Kakkonen (Second Division)	Group B	Finnish FA (Suomen Pallolitto)	10th	Relegated. HJS Akatemia
2019	Tier 4	Kolmonen (Third Division)	Group A	Tampere District (SPL Tampere)	1st	Promoted. HJS Akatemia
2020	Tier 3	Kakkonen (Second Division)	Group B	Finnish FA (Suomen Pallolitto)	3rd	
2021	Tier 3	Kakkonen (Second Division)	Group B	Finnish FA (Suomen Pallolitto)	4th	
2022	Tier 3	Kakkonen (Second Division)	Group B	Finnish FA (Suomen Pallolitto)	7th	
2023	Tier 3	Kakkonen (Second Division)	Group B	Finnish FA (Suomen Pallolitto)	10th	
2024	Tier 4	Kakkonen (Second Division)	Group B	Finnish FA (Suomen Pallolitto)	2nd	Promotion Playoff 2nd round
2025	Tier 4	Kakkonen (Second Division)	Group B	Finnish FA (Suomen Pallolitto)		

- 5 season in Third tier
- 4 seasons in Fourth tier
- 1 season in Fifth tier
