= FC Lahti =

Association football club in Finland

Lahti
- Full name: Football Club Lahti
- Nickname: Mustat kuhnurit (The Black Drones)
- Founded: 1996; 30 years ago
- Ground: Toolpoint Arena, Lahti
- Capacity: 14,500 (7,465 seated)
- Chairman: Mika Halttunen
- Manager: Gonçalo Pereira
- League: Veikkausliiga
- 2026: Veikkausliiga, 7th of 12
- Website: www.fclahti.fi
Home colours	Away colours	Third colours

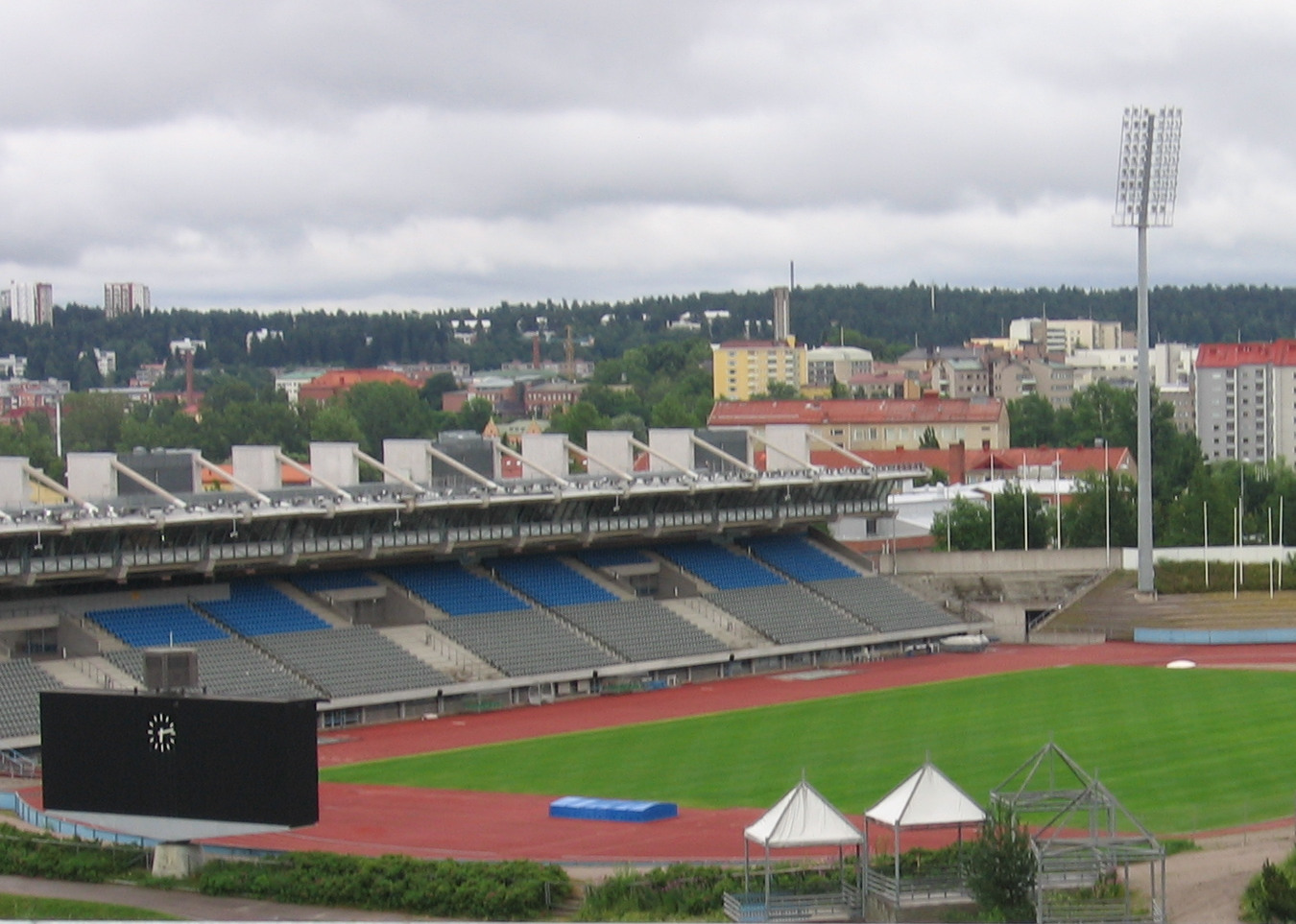
Lahden Stadion

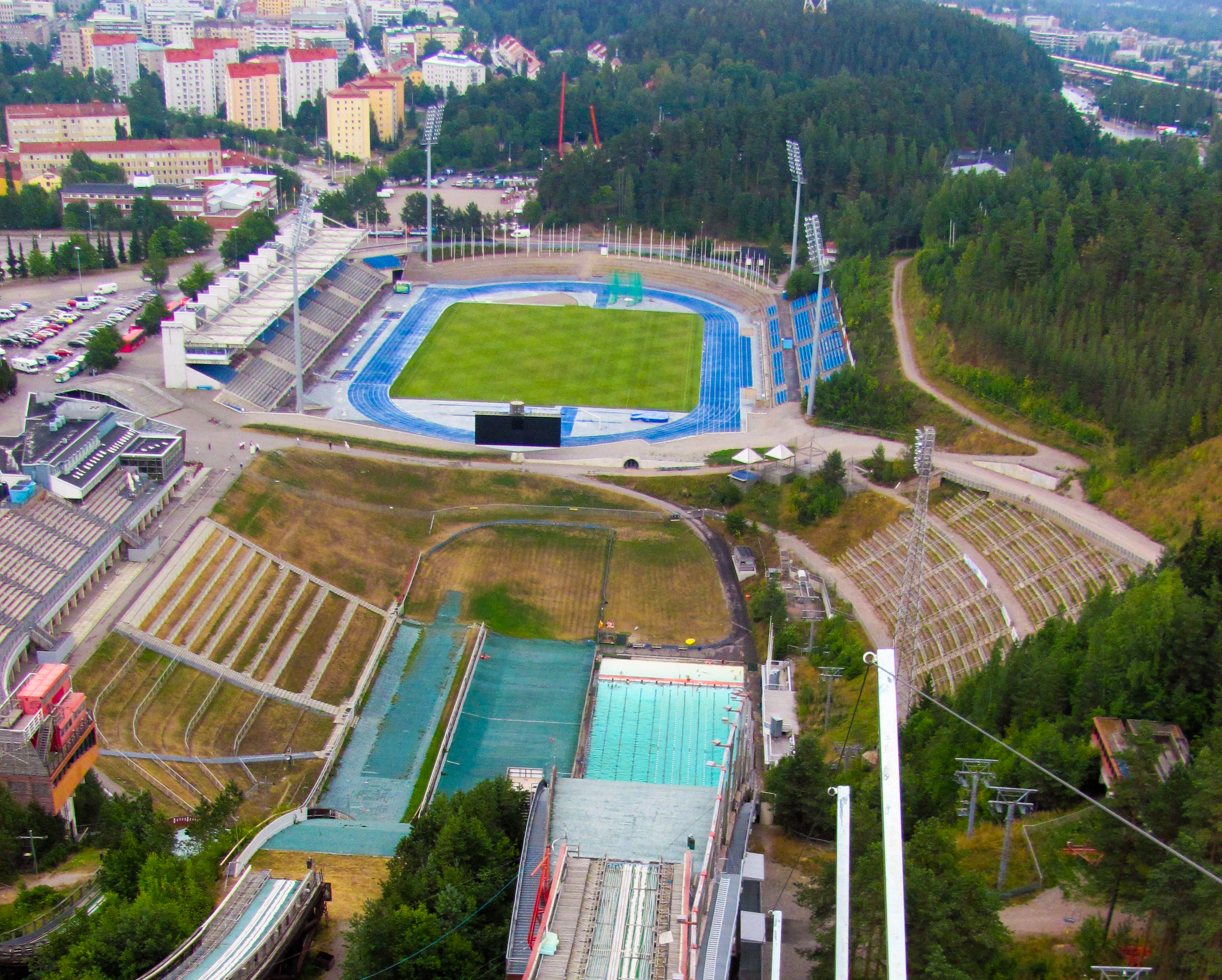
Lahden Stadion – Aerial view

FC Lahti is a Finnish professional football club based in the city of Lahti. It currently plays in the Finnish highest tier Veikkausliiga, after being promoted from Ykkösliiga after the 2025 season. The home ground of Lahti is Toolpoint Arena. Lahti is famous of being the local team of the most successful Finnish player, Jari Litmanen, who played for the club in two stints in 2004 and 2009–10. In his youth years and the start of his career, he played in Reipas Lahti.

== History ==
Lahti was founded in 1996 when two rival clubs from Lahti – Kuusysi and Reipas Lahti (founded in Viipuri and moved to Lahti after Viipuri was ceded to USSR in 1947) – decided to merge. Also, the reserve club Pallo-Lahti was formed, but it was closed down after a couple of seasons due to economic difficulties. Both Reipas and Kuusysi controlled the junior section of the club. From 1996, there was only one original staff member left at start of the 2026 season, Pekka Penttinen.

Lahti played its first season in 1997, in the southern group of Ykkönen, the second tier of Finnish football. It finished second in the first half of the split league format Ykkönen, but was placed third in the final half, behind Haka and PK-35, both of which were promoted to Veikkausliiga. The next season, in 1998, saw success and Lahti finally gained promotion to the highest tier. They were relegated at the end of the 2010 season, but bounced back after just one season in Ykkönen.

In the premier division, Lahti has not yet achieved the success of Kuusysi and Reipas. In 2007, Lahti won the Finnish League Cup. In 2008 Lahti was third in the Veikkausliiga final table and was placed in the UEFA Europa League qualification rounds for season 2009. Lahti repeated the success in 2014 by finishing third for the second time in their history. The club qualified to the Europa League qualifiers for the third time in 2018 when the club finished fourth in the table the season before.

== Honours ==
- Finnish League Cup
  - Winners: 2007, 2013, 2016
  - Runners-up: 2004, 2005
- Finnish Cup
  - Runners-up: 2002

== Crest and colours ==
=== Kit manufacturers and shirt sponsors ===
Period	Kit manufacturer	Shirt sponsor	Ref
2004	Umbro	Lahti Energia	
2005–07	?	?	
2008	Umbro	Lahti Energia	
2009–17	?	?	
2018–21	Umbro	Halton	
2022	Adidas	Halton	

== FC Lahti in Europe ==
Updated 20 July 2018

Season	Competition	Round	Club	Home	Away	Aggregate
2009–10	UEFA Europa League	1Q	(Albania) Dinamo Tirana	4–1	0–2	4–3
2009–10	UEFA Europa League	2Q	(Slovenia) Gorica	2–0	0–1	2–1
2009–10	UEFA Europa League	3Q	(Belgium) Club Brugge	1–1	2–3	3–4
2015–16	UEFA Europa League	1Q	(Sweden) Elfsborg	2–2	0–5	2–7
2018–19	UEFA Europa League	1Q	(Iceland) FH	0–3	0–0	0–3

Notes

- 1Q: First qualifying round
- 2Q: Second qualifying round
- 3Q: Third qualifying round

== Season to season ==
Season	Level	Division	Section	Administration	Position	Movements
1997	Tier 2	Ykkönen (First Division)	South Group	Finnish FA (Suomen Palloliitto)	2nd	Promotion Group – 3rd
1998	Tier 2	Ykkönen (First Division)	South Group	Finnish FA (Suomen Palloliitto)	1st	Promotion Group – 1st – Promoted
1999	Tier 1	Veikkausliiga (Premier League)		Finnish FA (Suomen Palloliitto)	10th	Relegation Group – Play-offs
2000	Tier 1	Veikkausliiga (Premier League)		Finnish FA (Suomen Palloliitto)	8th	
2001	Tier 1	Veikkausliiga (Premier League)		Finnish FA (Suomen Palloliitto)	9th	
2002	Tier 1	Veikkausliiga (Premier League)		Finnish FA (Suomen Palloliitto)	7th	Upper Group – 8th
2003	Tier 1	Veikkausliiga (Premier League)		Finnish FA (Suomen Palloliitto)	5th	
2004	Tier 1	Veikkausliiga (Premier League)		Finnish FA (Suomen Palloliitto)	7th	
2005	Tier 1	Veikkausliiga (Premier League)		Finnish FA (Suomen Palloliitto)	6th	
2006	Tier 1	Veikkausliiga (Premier League)		Finnish FA (Suomen Palloliitto)	8th	
2007	Tier 1	Veikkausliiga (Premier League)		Finnish FA (Suomen Palloliitto)	8th	
2008	Tier 1	Veikkausliiga (Premier League)		Finnish FA (Suomen Palloliitto)	3rd	
2009	Tier 1	Veikkausliiga (Premier League)		Finnish FA (Suomen Palloliitto)	11th	
2010	Tier 1	Veikkausliiga (Premier League)		Finnish FA (Suomen Palloliitto)	14th	Relegated
2011	Tier 2	Ykkönen (First Division)		Finnish FA (Suomen Palloliitto)	1st	Promoted
2012	Tier 1	Veikkausliiga (Premier League)		Finnish FA (Suomen Palloliitto)	5th	
2013	Tier 1	Veikkausliiga (Premier League)		Finnish FA (Suomen Palloliitto)	5th	
2014	Tier 1	Veikkausliiga (Premier League)		Finnish FA (Suomen Palloliitto)	3rd	
2015	Tier 1	Veikkausliiga (Premier League)		Finnish FA (Suomen Palloliitto)	5th	
2016	Tier 1	Veikkausliiga (Premier League)		Finnish FA (Suomen Palloliitto)	8th	
2017	Tier 1	Veikkausliiga (Premier League)		Finnish FA (Suomen Palloliitto)	4th	
2018	Tier 1	Veikkausliiga (Premier League)		Finnish FA (Suomen Palloliitto)	8th	
2019	Tier 1	Veikkausliiga (Premier League)		Finnish FA (Suomen Palloliitto)	8th	
2020	Tier 1	Veikkausliiga (Premier League)		Finnish FA (Suomen Palloliitto)	6th	
2021	Tier 1	Veikkausliiga (Premier League)		Finnish FA (Suomen Palloliitto)	7th	
2022	Tier 1	Veikkausliiga (Premier League)		Finnish FA (Suomen Palloliitto)	11th	Relegation play-offs
2023	Tier 1	Veikkausliiga (Premier League)		Finnish FA (Suomen Palloliitto)	10th	
2024	Tier 1	Veikkausliiga (Premier League)		Finnish FA (Suomen Palloliitto)	11th	Relegation play-offs – Relegated
2025	Tier 2	Ykkösliiga (First Division)		Finnish FA (Suomen Palloliitto)		

- 25 seasons in Veikkausliiga
- 3 seasons in Ykkönen

== Players ==
=== Current squad ===
As of 28 October 2026

Note: Flags indicate national team as defined under FIFA eligibility rules; some limited exceptions apply. Players may hold more than one non-FIFA nationality.

No.	Pos.	Nation	Player
2	DF	FIN	Joel Lehtonen
3	DF	FRA	Romain Sans
4	DF	POR	José Müller
5	DF	BRA	Nícolas Dantas
6	DF	FIN	Väinö Vehkonen
7	MF	FIN	Daniel Heikkinen
8	MF	ESP	Tòfol Montiel
9	FW	FIN	Aaron Lindholm
10	MF	FIN	Otso Koskinen
11	MF	POR	Martim Ferreira
12	GK	FIN	Aatu Hakala

No.	Pos.	Nation	Player
13	GK	FIN	Veikka Rättö
14	MF	SWE	Erik Andersson
17	FW	FIN	Amir Belabid
18	MF	FRA	Yohan Cassubie
19	FW	BRA	Neemias
20	FW	FIN	Justus Ojanen
21	DF	FIN	Matias Vainionpää
25	DF	FIN	Topias Inkinen
27	DF	FRA	Romaric Yapi
28	MF	FIN	Armend Kabashi
77	FW	FIN	Momodou Sarr

=== Out on loan ===
Note: Flags indicate national team as defined under FIFA eligibility rules; some limited exceptions apply. Players may hold more than one non-FIFA nationality.

No.	Pos.	Nation	Player

== Management ==
Updated 27 November 2023.

Name	Role
(Portugal) Gonçalo Pereira	Head coach
(Portugal) João Pires	Assistant Coach
(Finland) Kari Arkivuo	Assistant Coach
(Finland) Mika Heino	Fitness Coach
(Finland) Joni Kallioinen	Talent Coach
(Finland) Mikko Poutiainen	Physiotherapist
(Finland) Erno Jokinen	Physiotherapist
(Finland) Jarkko Koskinen	Kit Manager
(Finland) Janne Kaartti	Masseur
(Finland) Jussi Juurikka	Team Manager
(Finland) Marko Kolsi	Sporting director

== FC Lahti Akatemia ==
Lahti's reserve team played its last season in Kakkonen in 2017. After they were relegated to Kolmonen for the 2018 season, the team's activity was taken over by its administrational parent club Kuusysi.

== Managers ==
- (Finland) Esa Pekonen (1 January 1998 – 31 December 1999)
- (Finland) Jari Pyykölä (27 August 1999 – 31 December 2001)
- (Finland) Harri Kampman (1 January 2002 – 31 December 2005)
- (Finland) Antti Muurinen (1 January 2006 – 10 October 2007)
- (Brazil) Luciano (10 October 2007 – 31 December 2007)
- (Finland) Ilkka Mäkelä (1 January 2008 – 31 December 2010)
- (Finland) Tommi Kautonen (1 January 2011 – 4 June 2013)
- (Finland) Juha Malinen (5 June 2013 – 31 December 2013)
- (Finland) Toni Korkeakunnas (1 January 2014 – 30 September 2018)
- (Finland) Sami Ristilä (1 October 2018 – 31 December 2019)
- (Finland) Ilir Zeneli (1 January 2020 – 23 June 2022)
- (Finland) Mikko Mannila (26 June 2022 – 31 August 2023)
- (Finland) Toni Lindberg (31 August 2023 – 20 June 2024)
- (Portugal) Ricardo Duarte (21 June 2024 – 20 December 2024)
- (Portugal) Gonçalo Pereira (20 December 2024 – present)
