= List of Finnish football transfers summer 2024 =

This is a list of Finnish football transfers for the 2024 summer transfer window. Only transfers featuring Veikkausliiga are listed.

== Veikkausliiga ==
Note: Flags indicate national team as has been defined under FIFA eligibility rules. Players may hold more than one non-FIFA nationality.

=== Ekenäs IF ===
In:

No.	Pos.	Nation	Player
—	FW	(Finland) FIN	Samuel Anini Junior (from (Finland) HJK Helsinki)
—	DF	(Ghana) GHA	Kingsley Gyamfi (loan from (Sweden) Hammarby)
—	FW	(Sweden) SWE	Elton Hedström (loan from (Sweden) Hammarby Talang FF)
—	DF	(Sweden) SWE	Benjamin Hjertstrand (from (Kazakhstan) FC Zhenis)
—	GK	(Finland) FIN	Otto Huuhtanen (from (Finland) Ilves II)
—	GK	(Finland) FIN	Jere Koponen (from (Finland) Salon Palloilijat)
—	FW	(Ghana) GHA	Frank Owusu (from (Ghana) Aduana Stars F.C.)

Out:

No.	Pos.	Nation	Player
—	FW	(Finland) FIN	Tobias Fagerström (to (Germany) SV Atlas Delmenhorst)
—	GK	(Greece) GRE	Nikos Giannakopoulos (to (Greece) Panionios F.C.)
—	GK	(Finland) FIN	Otto Huuhtanen (free agent)
—	DF	(Kosovo) KOS	Arian Kabashi (to (Bulgaria) POFC Botev Vratsa)
—	MF	(France) FRA	Abdoulaye Kanté (loan return to (Finland) Ilves)
—	DF	(Finland) FIN	Henri Malundama (to (Sweden) AFC Eskilstuna)
—	GK	(Finland) FIN	Onni Rintamäki (loan to (Finland) Esbo Bollklubb)

=== IF Gnistan ===
In:

No.	Pos.	Nation	Player
—	GK	(United States) USA	AJ Marcucci (loan from (United States) New York Red Bulls)
—	DF	(Finland) FIN	Oliver Pettersson (from (Finland) HJK Helsinki)
—	FW	(Finland) FIN	Tim Väyrynen (from (Liechtenstein) FC Vaduz)

Out:

No.	Pos.	Nation	Player
—	DF	(Finland) FIN	Sampo Ala-Iso (to (Finland) KPV Kokkola)
—	DF	(Finland) FIN	Jean-Claude Mabinda (loan to (Finland) JäPS)
—	GK	(Sweden) SWE	Mathias Nilsson (loan return to (Sweden) Malmö FF)
—	FW	(Finland) FIN	Momodou Sarr (to (Denmark) Kolding IF)

=== FC Haka ===
In:

No.	Pos.	Nation	Player
—	DF	(Finland) FIN	Jesse Nikki (from (Finland) Honka II)
—	FW	(Finland) FIN	Anthony Olusanya (loan from (Finland) HJK Helsinki)
—	MF	(Netherlands) NED	Benjamin Reemst (from (Netherlands) FC Dordrecht)
—	MF	(Finland) FIN	Oskari Sallinen (from (Finland) IFK Mariehamn)

Out:

No.	Pos.	Nation	Player
—	MF	(Finland) FIN	Juho Kilo (to (Netherlands) ADO Den Haag)
—	FW	(Finland) FIN	Oiva Laaksonen (loan to (Sweden) AFC Eskilstuna)
—	DF	(Portugal) POR	Rodrigo Macedo (free agent)

=== HJK Helsinki ===
In:

No.	Pos.	Nation	Player
—	MF	(Belgium) BEL	Alessandro Albanese (from (Belgium) K.V. Oostende)
—	DF	(Greece) GRE	Georgios Antzoulas (from (Hungary) Újpest FC)
—	FW	(Scotland) SCO	Lee Erwin (to (Lebanon) Al-Ahed FC)
—	FW	(Finland) FIN	Roni Hudd (from (Finland) VPS)
—	MF	(Azerbaijan) AZE	Ozan Kökcü (from (Netherlands) FC Eindhoven)
—	FW	(Finland) FIN	Kai Meriluoto (loan return from (Poland) Stal Mielec)
—	GK	(Netherlands) NED	Thijmen Nijhuis (from (Netherlands) FC Utrecht)
—	FW	(Finland) FIN	Anthony Olusanya (loan to (Finland) FC Haka)
—	DF	(Finland) FIN	Daniel O'Shaughnessy (from (Germany) Karlsruher SC)
—	MF	(Estonia) EST	Kevor Palumets (loan from (Belgium) Zulte Waregem)

Out:

No.	Pos.	Nation	Player
—	FW	(Finland) FIN	Samuel Anini Junior (to (Finland) Ekenäs IF)
—	FW	(Finland) FIN	Stanislav Baranov (loan to (Estonia) Tallinna Kalev)
—	FW	(Finland) FIN	David Ezeh (loan to (Poland) Raków Częstochowa)
—	GK	(Finland) FIN	Elmo Henriksson (loan to (Spain) Sporting de Gijón)
—	FW	(Finland) FIN	Topi Keskinen (to (Scotland) Aberdeen F.C.)
—	DF	(Spain) ESP	Carlos Moros Gracia (to (Sweden) Degerfors IF)
—	DF	(Finland) FIN	Oliver Pettersson (to (Finland) IF Gnistan)
—	MF	(Finland) FIN	Aaro Toivonen (loan to (Estonia) Tallinna Kalev)
—	DF	(Finland) FIN	Diogo Tomas (to (Netherlands) ADO Den Haag)
—	DF	(Estonia) EST	Andreas Vaher (to (Estonia) Flora Tallinn)
—	MF	(Finland) FIN	Johannes Yli-Kokko (to (Finland) Inter Turku)

=== Ilves ===
In:

No.	Pos.	Nation	Player
—	FW	(Nigeria) NGA	Adeleke Akinyemi (from (Czech Republic) MFK Karvina)
—	DF	(Nigeria) NGA	Joshua Akpudje (from (Georgia (country)) Dinamo Tbilisi)
—	MF	(Ghana) GHA	Isaac Atanga (loan from (Norway) Aalesunds FK)
—	MF	(France) FRA	Abdoulaye Kanté (loan return from (Finland) Ekenäs IF)
—	GK	(Finland) FIN	Ville Seppä (from (Finland) Inter Turku)
—	MF	(Netherlands) NED	Sander Sybrandy (loan from (Netherlands) Twente U21)

Out:

No.	Pos.	Nation	Player
—	DF	(Senegal) SEN	Seynabou Benga (free agent)
—	FW	(Finland) FIN	Santeri Haarala (to (Sweden) Djurgårdens IF)
—	DF	(Ghana) GHA	Mohammed Umar (to (Romania) Politehnica Iași)
—	GK	(Finland) FIN	Johannes Viitala (loan to (Finland) IFK Mariehamn)

=== FC Inter Turku ===
In:

No.	Pos.	Nation	Player
—	FW	(Croatia) CRO	Viktor Kanižaj (from (Croatia) NK Lokomotiva Zagreb)
—	DF	(Netherlands) NED	Bart Straalman (from (Czech Republic) MFK Vyškov)
—	MF	(Finland) FIN	Johannes Yli-Kokko (from (Finland) HJK Helsinki)

Out:

No.	Pos.	Nation	Player
—	FW	(Finland) FIN	Otto Lehtisalo (loan to (Finland) Salon Palloilijat)
—	FW	(Finland) FIN	Djoully Nzoko (to (Belgium) Jong Genk)
—	GK	(Finland) FIN	Ville Seppä (to (Finland) Ilves)
—	FW	(Finland) FIN	Timo Stavitski (to (Sweden) Mjällby AIF)

=== KuPS ===
In:

No.	Pos.	Nation	Player
—	FW	(Sweden) SWE	Ousmane Diawara (loan from (Austria) SCR Altach)
—	FW	(Brazil) BRA	Lucas Rangel ( (Ukraine) FC Kolos Kovalivka)

Out:

No.	Pos.	Nation	Player
—	DF	(Netherlands) NED	Justin Bakker (to (Netherlands) SBV Vitesse)
—	FW	(Finland) FIN	Pyry Lampinen (to (Finland) FC Jyväskylä Blackbird)
—	FW	(Nigeria) NGA	Mohammed Muritala (to (Finland) JS Hercules)

=== FC Lahti ===
In:

No.	Pos.	Nation	Player
—	FW	(Portugal) POR	Jordão Cardoso (from (Portugal) SC Vianense)
—	DF	(Finland) FIN	Tobias Karkulowski (from (Finland) SJK Akatemia)
—	DF	(Finland) FIN	Eemil Laamanen (loan return from (Finland) JäPS)
—	MF	(Brazil) BRA	Luquinhas (from (Brazil) Amazonas Futebol Clube)
—	GK	(Sweden) SWE	David Mikhail (loan from (Sweden) IFK Värnamo)
—	MF	(Bosnia and Herzegovina) BIH	Benjamin Mulahalilovic (from (Austria) SV Horn)
—	DF	(Austria) AUT	Felix Strauß (from (Austria) SCR Altach)
—	DF	(Austria) AUT	Julian Tomka (loan from (Austria) SKU Amstetten)

Out:

No.	Pos.	Nation	Player
—	MF	(Portugal) POR	Bubacar Djaló (to (Kuwait) Al-Tadamon SC)
—	FW	(Finland) FIN	Vilho Huovila (loan to (Finland) MP)
—	FW	(Netherlands) NED	Colin Odutayo (to (Switzerland) FC Aarau)
—	GK	(England) ENG	Josh Oluwayemi (to (New Zealand) Wellington Phoenix FC)
—	DF	(Finland) FIN	Akseli Puukko (to (Italy) Bologna)
—	DF	(Austria) AUT	Julian Tomka (loan return to (Austria) SKU Amstetten)

=== IFK Mariehamn ===
In:

No.	Pos.	Nation	Player
—	FW	(Brazil) BRA	Dé (loan return from (Ukraine) FC Oleksandriya)
—	MF	(Niger) NIG	Mamane Amadou Sabo (loan from (Sweden) Hammarby)
—	GK	(Finland) FIN	Johannes Viitala (loan from (Finland) Ilves)
—	DF	(Finland) FIN	Kalle Wallius (loan from (Norway) IK Start)

Out:

No.	Pos.	Nation	Player
—	MF	(Finland) FIN	Oskari Sallinen (to (Finland) FC Haka)

=== AC Oulu ===
In:

No.	Pos.	Nation	Player
—	MF	(Iraq) IRQ	André Alsanati (loan from (Sweden) IK Sirius)
—	DF	(Sweden) SWE	Simon Bengtsson (loan from (Sweden) Helsingborgs IF)
—	DF	(Netherlands) NED	Léon Bergsma (from (Netherlands) SC Cambuur)
—	DF	(The Gambia) GAM	Musa Jatta (loan from (Slovakia) Podbrezová)

Out:

No.	Pos.	Nation	Player
—	MF	(Iraq) IRQ	André Alsanati (loan return to (Sweden) IK Sirius)
—	DF	(Finland) FIN	Eelis Taskila (free agent)

=== SJK Seinäjoki ===
In:

No.	Pos.	Nation	Player
—	FW	(The Gambia) GAM	Momodou Bojang (from (Morocco) KAC Marrakech)
—	MF	(Argentina) ARG	Gonzalo Miceli (from (Argentina) Deportivo Merlo)
—	GK	(Nicaragua) NCA	Miguel Rodríguez (from (Nicaragua) Diriangen F.C., previously on loan at SJK Akatemia)
—	DF	(Scotland) SCO	Lewis Strapp (from (Scotland) Greenock Morton F.C.)
—	FW	(Finland) FIN	Jeremiah Streng (loan return from (Italy) Ascoli)

Out:

No.	Pos.	Nation	Player
—	DF	(Ivory Coast) CIV	Ibrahim Cissé (loan to (Lithuania) FC Džiugas Telšiai)
—	DF	(Finland) FIN	Dario Naamo (loan to (Austria) SKN St. Pölten)
—	FW	(Ghana) GHA	Kingsley Ofori (free agent)

=== VPS ===
In:

No.	Pos.	Nation	Player
—	FW	(Nigeria) NGA	Emmanuel Ogude (from (Iraq) Al-Qasim SC)
—	FW	(Australia) AUS	Luka Smyth (from (Australia) Central Coast Mariners FC)
—	GK	(Finland) FIN	Lauri Vetri (loan return from (Finland) Vasa IFK)

Out:

No.	Pos.	Nation	Player
—	FW	(Finland) FIN	Roni Hudd (to (Finland) HJK Helsinki)
—	FW	(Suriname) SUR	Gleofilo Vlijter (to (Serbia) OFK Beograd)

== See also ==
- 2024 Veikkausliiga
