= 2014 Finnish Cup =

Suomen Cup

Tournament details
- Country: Finland
- Teams: 152

Tournament statistics
- Matches played: 66
- Goals scored: 268 (4.06 per match)

The 2014 Finnish Cup (Suomen Cup) is the 60th season of the Finnish Cup. 152 clubs entered the competition, including all sides on the top two levels of the Finnish football pyramid (Veikkausliiga and Ykkönen), 29 sides from Kakkonen and 101 from lower levels. The winner of the cup enters the qualifying rounds of the 2015–16 UEFA Europa League.

== Teams ==
| Round | Dates | Clubs involved | Winners from previous round | New entries this round | Leagues entering this round |
|---|---|---|---|---|---|
| First round | 15 Dec 2013 – 13 Feb 2014 | 70 | − | 70 | Kolmonen and lower levels (70 teams) |
| Second round | 15 Dec 2013 – 13 Feb 2014 | 66 | 35 | 31 | Kolmonen and lower levels (31 teams) |
| Third round | 18 Feb – 12 Mar | 72 | 33 | 39 | Ykkönen (10 teams); Kakkonen (29 teams) |
| Fourth round | 3–18 Mar | 40 | 36 | 4 | Veikkausliiga (4 teams) |
| Fifth round | 19 Mar – 6 Apr | 24 | 20 | 4 | Veikkausliiga (4 teams) |
| Sixth round | 9–10 Apr | 16 | 12 | 4 | Veikkausliiga (4 teams) |
| Quarter-finals | 30 April | 8 | 8 | − | − |
| Semi-finals | 16 August | 4 | 4 | − | − |
| Final | 27 September | 2 | 2 | − | − |

== First round ==
70 teams playing in the Kolmonen and lower leagues started the cup at the first round. The draw for the first and second rounds was held on 12 December 2013.

| 29 December 2013 | Janakkalan Pallo (5D) | 2–2 (3–2 p) | Loiske (3D) | Hämeenlinna |
| 14:15 EET | Kinnunen 80', 80+4' | | | Stadium: Säästöpankki Areena |

| 4 January 2014 | PPV/2 (6D) | 3–1 | FC Spede (6D) | Helsinki |
| 14:00 EET | Sorri; Sorri (o.g.) | | Hyttinen | Stadium: Talin halli Referee: Mohammed al-Emara |

| 4 January 2014 | FC KaKe (5D) | 6–0 | HDS Mondial (5D) | Helsinki |
| 15:30 EET | Hiitola 11', 45', 61'; Niemi 20'; Mäkelä 77'; Rauhala 80' | | | Stadium: Talin halli |

| 6 January 2014 | ToU/2 (5D) | 0–11 | Joensuun Palloseura (3D) | Kuopio |
| 11:30 EET | | | Nevalainen; Mähönen; Naakka; Voutilainen; Voutilainen; Kajander; Voutilainen; Mähönen; Naakka; Mähönen (o.g.) | Stadium: Kuopiohalli |

| 6 January 2014 | Toivalan Urheilijat (4D) | 1–6 | Siilinjärven Palloseura (3D) | Kuopio |
| 20:00 EET | | | | Stadium: Kuopiohalli |

| 11 January 2014 | FC POHU Akatemia (5D) | 0–2 | Töölön Taisto (3D) | Helsinki |
| 14:45 EET | | | Braganza; Klinga | Stadium: Talin halli |

| 11 January 2014 | HJK-j/Töölö (6D) | 1–0 | Helsingin Palloseura (3D) | Helsinki |
| 16:30 EET | Paavola | | | Stadium: Talin halli Attendance: 400; Referee: Topias Tuira |

| 11 January 2014 | PoPo (6D) | 2–3 | FC Peltirumpu (3D) | Kotka |
| 18:00 EET | | | Koskinen 25', 67'; Iiskola 54' | Stadium: Ruonalan urheiluhalli |

| 11 January 2014 | HIFK/3 (4D) | 12–1 | Kallion Stallions (6D) | Helsinki |
| 18:30 EET | | | | Stadium: Kartanon kenttä Referee: Mansaray Foday |

| 16 January 2014 | Edsevö Bollklubb (6D) | 0–13 | KPV-j (4D) | Kokkola |
| 21:00 EET | | | Korkiakangas (2); Hakala (6); Malwal; Garang (3); Ahvenkoski | Stadium: Kipparihalli |

| 17 January 2014 | Helsingin Ponnistus (4D) | 0–2 | HIFK/4 (6D) | Helsinki |
| 20:30 EET | | | Ravattinen; Tuomi | Stadium: Töölön pallokenttä 6 Referee: Sami Juselius |

| 18 January 2014 | Kaarinan Reipas (4D) | 1–0 | Toejoen Veikot (3D) | Kaarina |
| 17:00 EET | | | | Stadium: Kaarinan tekonurmi |

| 18 January 2014 | SAPA (3D) | 1–0 | Laajasalon Palloseura (3D) | Helsinki |
| 18:00 EET | Vanhatalo | | | Stadium: Töölön pallokenttä 6 Referee: Petteri Kajanmaa |

| 18 January 2014 | Orimattilan Pedot (4D) | 2–2 (5–6 p) | Tuusulan Palloseura (3D) | Lahti |
| 18:00 EET | | | | Stadium: Mukkula |

| 18 January 2014 | Malax IF (4D) | 2–0 | Black Islanders (6D) | Vaasa |
| 18:00 EET | | | | Stadium: Botniahalli; Referee: Leif Rönn |

| 18 January 2014 | FC SUMU (4D) | 0–3 | HPS/2 (4D) | Helsinki |
| 19:30 EET | | | Lehtonen; Löfberg; Peltoniemi | Stadium: Töölön pallokenttä 6 Referee: Janne Ylijääskö |

| 18 January 2014 | FC Korso United (5D) | 2–4 | SexyPöxyt (3D) | Espoo |
| 20:00 EET | | | | Stadium: Laaksolahden halli |

| 19 January 2014 | Kuopion Elo (5D) | 0–1 | SC Riverball (3D) | Kuopio |
| 20:30 EET | | | Eskelinen 44' | Stadium: Kuopiohalli |

| 19 January 2014 | LeKi-Futis (4D) | 1–0 | Parolan Visa (5D) | Tampere |
| 20:40 EET | | | | Stadium: Pirkkahalli |

| 22 January 2014 | Järvelän Jäppärä (6D) | 0–1 | Ekenäs Sport Club (3D) | Lahti |
| 21:00 EET | | | | Stadium: Mukkula |

| 23 January 2014 | GrIFK/2 (5D) | 0–3 | Riihimäen Palloseura (3D) | Tammela |
| 20:30 EET | | | | Stadium: Eerikkilän jalkapallohalli |

| 24 January 2014 | Gnistan/2 (4D) | 0–1 | Kiffen (3D) | Helsinki |
| 20:30 EET | | | | Stadium: Töölön pallokenttä 6 |

| 25 January 2014 | SAPA/M3 (4D) | 0–1 | Gnistan/Ogeli (4D) | Helsinki |
| 14:15 EET | | | Degerstedt | Stadium: Talin halli Referee: Elmin Salkicevic |

| 25 January 2014 | LeJa Juniors (5D) | 0–12 | MPS/Atletico Malmi (3D) | Helsinki |
| 18:00 EET | | | Vapaa 2 Hannula 3 Kauti 2 Huupponen; Rintala; Putkonen; Lehti 2 | Stadium: Töölön pallokenttä 6 Referee: Elmin Salkicevic |

| 25 January 2014 | Tampereen Peli-Pojat-70 (4D) | 4–0 | Apassit (5D) | Tampere |
| 18:00 EET | | | | Stadium: Pirkkahalli |

| 25 January 2014 | Club Latino Español (6D) | 0–5 | PK-35/VJS Akatemia (3D) | Helsinki |
| 18:30 EET | | | Lepistö; Mielonen; Halimi; Laiteenmäki own goal | Stadium: Kartanon kenttä Referee: Kaoua Mahfoud |

| 26 January 2014 | Kokkolan Palloseura (4D) | 0–4 | Rollon Pojat (4D) | Kokkola |
| 13:00 EET | | | | Stadium: Kipparihalli |

| 26 January 2014 | FC Pisa (5D) | 1–0 | Hämeenlinnan Härmä (3D) | Hämeenlinna |
| 13:15 EET | | | | Stadium: Pulleri |

| 26 January 2014 | FC Inter/2 (4D) | 0–3 | VG-62 (3D) | Turku |
| 16:15 EET | | | Salo 2 Virta | Stadium: Kupittaa 5 |

| 26 January 2014 | FC Hieho (5D) | 0–1 | Herttoniemen Toverit (3D) | Helsinki |
| 19:30 EET | | | | Stadium: Töölön pallokenttä 6 |

| 26 January 2014 | Valkealan Kajo (4D) | 1–2 | HaPK (3D) | Kuusankoski |
| 19:30 EET | | | | Stadium: Sami Hyypiä -areena |

| 30 January 2014 | Paimion Haka (4D) | 3–0 | MynPa (5D) | Kaarina |
| 20:15 EET | | | | Stadium: Kaarinan tekonurmi Referee: Nermin Okic |

| 1 February 2014 | JFC Helsinki (6D) | 0–4 | FC Kontu (3D) | Helsinki |
| 21:00 EET | | | Miettinen; Venäläinen; Räsänen; Palomäki | Stadium: Talin halli Referee: Sami Juselius |

| 7 February 2014 | PPJ (5D) | 0–4 | HIFK/2 (3D) | Helsinki |
| 21:00 EET | | | | Stadium: Talin halli |

| 8 February 2014 | I-HK (4D) | 0–4 | Etelä-Espoon Pallo (3D) | Vantaa |
| 14:00 EET | | | | Stadium: Itä-Hakkilan tekonurmi |

== Second round ==
The second round will be contested by the 35 winners from the previous round and 31 other teams playing in the Kolmonen and lower leagues, which received a bye on the first round. The draw for the first and second rounds was made on 12 December 2013.

| 11 January 2014 | Hyvinkään Ares (6D) | 0–9 | Nurmijärven Jalkapalloseura (3D) | Hyvinkää |
| 11:00 EET | | | Aittasalmi; Murto; Roulamo; Roulamo; Roulamo; Roulamo; Roulamo; Murto; Aittasalmi | Stadium: Kankurin tekonurmi |

| 26 January 2014 | FC Rauma (5D) | 1–4 | Peimari United (5D) | Rauma |
| 16:00 EET | Vainiola 72' | | Eriksson 6'; Salmiosalo 18', 20'; Nguyen | Stadium: Äijänsuon stadion |

| 31 January 2014 | HJK-j/Kannelmäki (4D) | 0–3 | Kiffen (3D) | Helsinki |
| 20:30 EET | | | Mainas; Komulainen; Lokake | Stadium: Töölön pallokenttä 6 Referee: Mohammed al-Emara |

| 2 February 2014 | Sudet/reservi (4D) | 4–0 | FC ETAPO (6D) | Kouvola |
| 12:30 EET | | | | Stadium: Lehtomäen tekonurmi |

| 2 February 2014 | Janakkalan Pallo (5D) | 3–0 | Tampereen Peli-Pojat-70 (4D) | Hämeenlinna |
| 18:15 EET | Jortikka; Paloposki (pen.); Humppi | | | Stadium: Säästöpankki Areena; Attendance: 109 |

| 2 February 2014 | HaPK (3D) | 2–6 | FC Peltirumpu (3D) | Kotka |
| | Mikkola 22'; Hassan 32' | | Koskinen 20', 53'; Raatikainen 44'; Laherto 54', 76'; Iiskola 65' | Stadium: Ruonalan halli |

| 4 February 2014 | Valkeakosken Koskenpojat (4D) | 1–0 | Mäntän Valo (5D) | Valkeakoski |
| 19:30 EET | | | | Stadium: Sahara |

| 6 February 2014 | Nopsa (3D) | 1–5 | Tuusulan Palloseura (3D) | Nastola |
| 18:15 EET | Kinnunen 53' | | Tiira 15', 59'; Ravi 40'; Lehtonen 78'; Honkanen 80' | Stadium: Pajulahden halli |

| 6 February 2014 | SC Riverball (3D) | 0–2 | Joensuun Palloseura (3D) | Joensuu |
| 20:30 EET | | | Saarinen; Saarinen | Stadium: Joensuu-Areena |

| 7 February 2014 | Siilinjärven Palloseura (3D) | 3–0 | Äänekosken Huima (3D) | Kuopio |
| 20:00 EET | Kasurinen 11'; Roivainen 12'; Kouvalainen | | | Stadium: Kuopiohalli |

| 7 February 2014 | HIFK/3 (4D) | 1–1 (4–3 p) | SAPA (3D) | Helsinki |
| 20:30 EET | | | Merikari 78' | Stadium: Töölön pallokenttä 6 |
| | Penalties |
| | | | Nieminen (penalty scored); Merikari (penalty scored); Koivisto (penalty scored); Peci (penalty missed); Helppi (penalty missed); Henriksson (penalty missed) |

| 8 February 2014 | PPV/2 (6D) | 2–4 | Gnistan/Ogeli (4D) | Helsinki |
| 08:00 EET | | | | Stadium: Talin halli |

| 8 February 2014 | HJK-j/Töölö (6D) | 7–2 | Gnistan/IP (6D) | Helsinki |
| 09:30 EET | Paavola; Roiko; Pohja; Nylund; Haapala; Roiha; Geagea | | Panov; Afizou | Stadium: Talin halli Referee: Petteri Kajanmaa |

| 8 February 2014 | FC Pisa (5D) | 3–1 | Forssan Jalkapalloklubi (4D) | Valkeakoski |
| 11:00 EET | | | Kaseva | Stadium: Sahara |

| 8 February 2014 | Jukola Jaguars (5D) | 1–1 (1–2 p) | Nekalan Pallo (4D) | Hämeenlinna |
| 15:00 EET | | | | Stadium: Säästöpankki Areena |

| 8 February 2014 | Rollon Pojat (4D) | 2–0 | Malax IF (4D) | Rovaniemi |
| 17:30 EET | Kiistala 51'; Aaltonen 62' | | | Stadium: Ounashalli |

| 8 February 2014 | MPS/Atletico Akatemia (6D) | 0–2 | FC SUMU/SOB (6D) | Helsinki |
| 18:00 EET | | | Tiusanen; Anttonen | Stadium: Töölön pallokenttä 6 Referee: Georg Borodavkin |

| 8 February 2014 | FC Honka/A2 (6D) | 1–1 (6–5 p) | SexyPöxyt (3D) | Espoo |
| 20:00 EET | | | | Stadium: Laaksolahden halli |

| 9 February 2014 | KPV-j (4D) | 4–0 | Kajaanin Haka (3D) | Kokkola |
| 16:00 EET | | | | Stadium: Kipparihalli |

| 9 February 2014 | VG-62 (3D) | 2–1 | Jomala IK (3D) | Naantali |
| 17:15 EET | | | | Stadium: Karvetti |

| 10 February 2014 | Laaksolahden Atleettiklubi (5D) | 0–1 | IF Sibbo-Vargarna (3D) | Sipoo |
| 20:30 EET | | | | Stadium: Söderkullan tekonurmi |

| 10 February 2014 | TamU-K (4D) | 1–2 | LeKi-Futis (4D) | Tampere |
| 22:30 EET | | | | Stadium: Pirkkahalli |

| 11 February 2014 | Mäntsälän Urheilijat (6D) | 0–8 | Riihimäen Palloseura (3D) | Mäntsälä |
| 19:00 EET | | | | Stadium: Mäntsälän tekonurmi |

| 11 February 2014 | Ekenäs Sport Club (3D) | 0–3 | Hyvinkään Palloseura (3D) | Hyvinkää |
| 19:30 EET | | | | Stadium: Kankurin tekonurmi |

| 11 February 2014 | Kaarinan Reipas (4D) | 1–3 | Paimion Haka (4D) | Kaarina |
| 20:00 EET | | | | Stadium: Kaarinan keskuskenttä |

| 12 February 2014 | Union Plaani (6D) | 0–11 | Sudet (3D) | Lahti |
| 21:00 EET | | | | Stadium: Mukkulan halli |

| 14 February 2014 | Espoon Palloseura (4D) | 0–1 | Etelä-Espoon Pallo (3D) | Espoo |
| 19:30 EET | | | | Stadium: Espoonlahden tekonurmi |

| 14 February 2014 | Töölön Vesa (4D) | 4–2 | Herttoniemen Toverit (3D) | Helsinki |
| 20:30 EET | | | | Stadium: Töölön pallokenttä 6 |

| 15 February 2014 | FC Kontu (3D) | 1–1 (4–3 p) | PK-35/VJS Akatemia (3D) | Helsinki |
| 11:00 EET | Miettinen | | Diasonama | Stadium: Talin halli Referee: Janne Ylijääskö |

| 15 February 2014 | Töölön Taisto (3D) | 3–3 (4–2 p) | MPS/Atletico Malmi (3D) | Helsinki |
| 12:30 EET | Klinga; Luokkamäki; Laakkonen | | Kouri; Nurkka; Tranbinh | Stadium: Talin halli Referee: Risto Lehikoinen |

| 15 February 2014 | HJK-j/Laajasalo (4D) | 1–1 (2–3 p) | HPS/2 (4D) | Helsinki |
| 20:30 EET |

| 18 February 2014 | HIFK/4 (6D) | 2–1 | FC HEIV (6D) | Helsinki |
| 17:00 EET | | | | Stadium: Talin halli |

| 22 February 2014 | FC KaKe (5D) | 1–12 | HIFK/2 (3D) | Helsinki |
| 18:00 EET | | | | Stadium: Töölön pallokenttä 6 |

== Third round ==
The 33 winners of the second round are joined in the third round by the 39 Ykkönen and Kakkonen sides. The draw for the third round was made on 5 February 2014, and the matches are scheduled to be played between 14 February and 7 March.

| 19 February 2014 | GBK (2D) | 1–3 | AC Oulu (1D) | Kokkola |
| 19:00 EET | Hohenthal 50' | | A. Nurmela 52'; Sohlo 83'; Satfsula 85' (pen.) | Stadium: Kipparihalli |

| 20 February 2014 | Valkeakosken Koskenpojat (4D) | 0–7 | TPV (2D) | Valkeakoski |
| 19:30 EET | | | Intala 13'; Karvonen 28', 43', 46'; Korsunov 53'; Muhumud 65'; Lindroos 89' (pen.) | Stadium: Sahara |

| 22 February 2014 | FC SUMU/SOB (6D) | 0–3 | KäPa (2D) | Helsinki |
| 08:45 EET | | | Penttinen 25'; Tshibasu 48'; T. Kallonen 73' | Stadium: Talin halli |

| 22 February 2014 | Gnistan/Ogeli (4D) | 2–0 | HIFK/3 (4D) | Helsinki |
| 14:00 EET | Virkkunen 22'; Pitkänen 57' | | | Stadium: Talin halli |

| 23 February 2014 | Riihimäen Palloseura (3D) | 0–4 | Sudet (3D) | Tammela |
| 20:00 EET | | | Nakari 13', 46'; Hermunen 18'; Venäläinen 52' | Stadium: Eerikkilä |

| 28 February 2014 | HIFK/2 (3D) | 1–5 | HIFK (1D) | Helsinki |
| 20:00 EET | Jännes 61' | | Priha 39'; Terävä 51', 90'; Kuusijärvi 55'; Karlsson 83' | Stadium: Talinhalli |

| 1 March 2014 | Töölön Vesa (4D) | 1–3 | FC Kontu (3D) | Helsinki |
| 08:45 EET | Virtanen 64' | | Miettinen 52'; Vuotovesi 68'; Vento(o.g.) 75' | Stadium: Talinhalli; Referee: Janne Suvensalmi |

| 1 March 2014 | Sudet/reservi (4D) | 0–3 | EIF (2D) | Kuusankoski |
| 12:45 EET | | | Källman 29'; Estlander 37'; Sevón 45+1' | Stadium: Sami Hyypiä Areena |

| 1 March 2014 | HJK-j/Töölö (6D) | 2–1 | Gnistan (2D) | Helsinki |
| 13:15 EET | Helin 35'; Savolainen 75' | | Pastila 16' | Stadium: Töölön Pallokenttä |

| 1 March 2014 | Rollon Pojat (4D) | 2–5 (a.e.t.) | PS Kemi (2D) | Rovaniemi |
| 14:00 EET | Petäjäjärvi 39'; Tyystälä 58' | | Gustavsson 13'; Peltoniemi 63' (pen.); Eissele 93', 97', 105' | Stadium: Ounashalli |

| 1 March 2014 | PK Keski-Uusimaa (2D) | 0–4 | FC KTP (1D) | Kerava |
| 15:00 EET | | | Kaivonurmi 14', 79'; Tyyskä 44'; Mulvany 88' | Stadium: Kalevan urheilupuisto |

| 1 March 2014 | FC Peltirumpu (3D) | 2–2 (a.e.t.) (4–3 p) | FC Espoo (2D) | Kouvola |
| 15:30 EET | Marttila 26'; Raatikainen 44' | | Saranen 23'; Sorsa 60' | Stadium: Lehtomäen tekonurmi |

| 1 March 2014 | HPS/2 (4D) | 1–4 | Klubi 04 (2D) | Helsinki |
| 15:45 EET | Koitilainen 57' | | Anyamele 9'; Vanhala 43'; Kastrati 63'; Shirkhani 78' | Stadium: Talinhalli |

| 1 March 2014 | KPV-j (4D) | 1–3 | JBK (2D) | Kokkola |
| 16:00 EET | Laitala 34' | | Alawo 11'; Knuts 38', 75' | Stadium: Kipparihalli; Attendance: 83 |

| 1 March 2014 | Atlantis FC (2D) | 6–0 | FC Myllypuro (2D) | Helsinki |
| 18:30 EET | Adriano 1', 62'; Tukiainen 4', 31'; Chidi 58'; Sipilä 75' | | | Stadium: Talin halli |

| 2 March 2014 | FC Pisa (5D) | 1–2 | Nekalan Pallo (4D) | Valkeakoski |
| 13:00 EET | Vilenius 58' | | Hyysalo 5'; Räisänen 26' (pen.) | Stadium: Sahara |

| 2 March 2014 | MaPS (2D) | 0–2 | FC Jazz (1D) | Naantali |
| 13:45 EET | | | Rantala 62'; Ukwuoma 85' | Stadium: Karvetin tekonurmi |

| 2 March 2014 | Hyvinkään Palloseura (3D) | 0–3 | FC Futura (2D) | Hyvinkää |
| 14:00 EET | | | Backman 17'; Kuusela 37'; Pösö 84' | Stadium: Kankurin TN |

| 2 March 2014 | LeKi-Futis (4D) | 4–3 | Janakkalan Pallo (5D) | Hämeenlinna |
| 14:15 EET | Lehtimäki 7', 30'; Heikkilä 20'; Niskanen 70' | | Lehtonen 4'; Tuomela 19'; Nieminen 84' (pen.) | Stadium: Säästöpankki-areena |

| 4 March 2014 | Kiffen (3D) | 0–0 (a.e.t.) (5–4 p) | Pallohonka (2D) | Espoo |
| 20:00 EET | | | | Stadium: Espoonlahden tekonurmi Referee: Gezim Arifi |
| | Penalties |
| | Pirinen (penalty scored); Iikkanen (penalty scored); Jääskeläinen (penalty scored); Kovalenko (penalty scored); Barsk (penalty scored) | | Keijama (penalty scored); Haapala (penalty scored); Jokela (penalty scored); Laevuo (penalty scored) |

| 5 March 2014 | KPV (2D) | 0–1 | AC Kajaani (2D) | Kokkola |
| 18:30 EET | | | Nzekwe 73' | Stadium: Kipparihalli |

| 5 March 2014 | Nurmijärven Jalkapalloseura (3D) | 4–3 (a.e.t.) | Tuusulan Palloseura (3D) | Nurmijärvi |
| 20:00 EET | Roulamo 2', 55'; Järvenpää 82'; Murto 101' | | Leinonen 47'; J. Tiira 72'; M. Tiira 84' | Stadium: Klaukkalan uusi TN; Referee: Joni Taipale |

| 7 March 2014 | Paimion Haka (4D) | 0–1 | ÅIFK (2D) | Paimio |
| 18:30 EET | | | Ojanperä 90+4' | Stadium: Paimion keskuskenttä |

| 7 March 2014 | FC Honka/A2 (6D) | 0–4 | BK-46 (2D) | Espoo |
| 20:00 EET | | | Lucas; Källberg; Kuqi; Brain | Stadium: Ratiopharm Areena |

| 7 March 2014 | Peimari United (5D) | 3–5 (a.e.t.) | Pallo-Iirot (2D) | Paimio |
| 20:30 EET | Vihervirta 20'; Vornanen 32'; Pirhonen 110' | | Laine 26' (o.g.); Mettälä 39'; Valtanen 92'; Tuuri 117', 120' | Stadium: Paimion keskuskenttä Referee: Joni Hyytiä |

| 8 March 2014 | Jippo (1D) | 0–4 | FC Haka (1D) | Joensuu |
| 14:00 EET | | | Metzger 33'; Poutiainen 73'; Multanen 86'; Mattila 88' | Stadium: Koillispuiston jp-nurmi Attendance: 218; Referee: Sami Kekäläinen |

| 8 March 2014 | GrIFK (2D) | 0–0 (4–2 p) | PK-35 Vantaa (1D) | Kauniainen |
| 14:30 EET | | | | Stadium: Kauniaisten Keskuskenttä; Attendance: 28; Referee: Hausin Fathulla |

| 8 March 2014 | SalPa (2D) | 0–1 | Ilves (1D) | Salo |
| 14:30 EET | | | Wojcik 56' | Stadium: Salon urheilupuisto |

| 8 March 2014 | Töölön Taisto (3D) | 0–1 | FC Viikkarit (2D) | Helsinki |
| 17:30 EET | | | Remes 73' | Stadium: Talinhalli; Referee: Santeri Nieminen |

| 8 March 2014 | HIFK/4 (6D) | 0–9 | FC Viikingit (1D) | Helsinki |
| 17:30 EET | | | Fidan Seferi 3', 7'; Ahonen 9', 84', 87'; Carlos 12', 38'; Faton Seferi 26'; V. Seferi 90' | Stadium: Talinhalli; Attendance: 108; Referee: Kasperi Korhonen |

| 8 March 2014 | IF Sibbo-Vargarna (3D) | 0–1 (a.e.t.) | JäPS (2D) | Sipoo |
| 18:00 EET | | | Kurittu 109' | Stadium: Söderkullan tekonurmi Referee: Sami Katko |

| 9 March 2014 | Joensuun Palloseura (3D) | 1–5 (a.e.t.) | Siilinjärven Palloseura (3D) | Joensuu |
| 15:00 EET | Nevalainen | | Janhonen; Kettunen; Jere Roivainen; Kettunen; Roivainen | Stadium: Joensuu Arena |

| 9 March 2014 | PK-37 (2D) | 0–1 | JJK Jyväskylä (1D) | Kuopio |
| 16:00 EET | | | Kari 63' | Stadium: Kuopion keskuskenttä Attendance: 78; Referee: Anton Mustonen |

| 9 March 2014 | VG-62 (3D) | 0–2 | FC Hämeenlinna (2D) | Naantali |
| 17:15 EET | | | Suomalainen 68', 90+1' | Stadium: Karvetin tekonurmi Attendance: 100; Referee: Pasi Kallio |

| 9 March 2014 | Etelä-Espoon Pallo (3D) | 3–1 | FC Lahti Akatemia (2D) | Espoo |
| 09:30 EET | Nikkola 43', 78'; Happonen 76' | | Tuomi 87' | Stadium: Espoonlahden tekonurmi 2 Referee: Peiman Simani |

| VIFK (2D) | walkover^{1} | TP-47 (2D) |

Notes

- Note 1: TP-47 withdrew from the competition.

== Fourth round ==
The fourth round will be contested by the winners of the previous round and the four Veikkausliiga teams that finish last in their groups in the 2014 Finnish League Cup. The round will be drawn on 25 or 26 February, and matches will be played between 3 and 18 March.

| 8 March 2014 | FC Peltirumpu (3D) | 1–2 | Atlantis FC (2D) | Kymenlaakson Sähkö Stadion, Kouvola |
| 16:00 | Raatikainen 66' | | Tukiainen 22'; Äijälä 76' |

| 12 March 2014 | Nekalan Pallo (4D) | 0–3 | RoPS (TD) | Tampere Exhibition and Sports Centre, Tampere |
| 18:30 | | | Kokko 31' (pen.), 35' (pen.), 37' |

| 12 March 2014 | KaPa (2D) | 1–2 (a.e.t.) | Lahti (TD) | Max Westerberg Areena, Helsinki |
| 19:30 | Koivisto 24' | | Ngueukam 32', 120+4' |

| 15 March 2014 | FC Kontu Itä-Helsinki (3D) | 0–8 | HIFK (1D) | Kontulan liikuntapuisto, Helsinki |
| 08:45 | | | Halme 11'; Karlsson 33'; Mustonen 44'; Hänninen 47' (pen.), 66' (pen.); Peltonen 68', 81', 89' |

| 15 March 2014 | VIFK (2D) | 3–2 (a.e.t.) | FC Jazz Pori (1D) | Botniahalli, Vaasa |
| | Nordman 1', 15'; Laine 103' | | Rantala 47'; Ukwuoma 75' |

| 15 March 2014 | HJK-j/Töölö (6D) | 3–0 | IF Gnistan/Ogeli (4D) | Töölö Sahara tekonurmi, Helsinki |
| | Pohja 7'; Koskinen 54'; Vasara 68' |

| 15 March 2014 | PS Kemi Kings (2D) | 3–1 | AC Kajaani (3D) | Sauvosaari, Kemi |
| 15:00 | Räihä 5'; Eissele 58'; Eissele 67' | | Nzekwe 90+3' |

| 15 March 2014 | ÅIFK (2D) | 1–4 | FC Ilves (1D) | Urheilupuiston yläkenttä, Turku |
| 15:00 | Ferati 56' (pen.) | | Petrescu 20'; Hjelm 29', 75'; K. Rantanen 86' |

| 15 March 2014 | TPV (2D) | 3–1 | Pallo-Iirot (2D) | Tammela Stadion, Tampere |
| 15:15 | Jokela 52'; Koroma 68'; Muhumud 90' | | Tuuri 17' |

| 15 March 2014 | Sudet (3D) | 1–2 | Siilinjärven Palloseura (3D) | Kouvolan keskuskenttä, Kouvola |
| 15:30 | Äijö 33' | | Janhonen 77'; Martikainen 80' (o.g.) |

| 15 March 2014 | Järvenpään Palloseura (2D) | 1–0 | Kotkan Työväen Palloilijat (1D) | Järvenpään keskuskenttä, Järvenpää |
| 17:00 | Liesjärvi 45' |

| 15 March 2014 | FC Hämeenlinna (2D) | 2–1 | FF Jaro (TD) | Kaurialan kenttä, Hämeenlinna |
| 19:30 | Suomalainen 48', 76' | | Kronholm 24' | Referee: Atte Jussila |

| 16 March 2014 | Nurmijärven Jalkapalloseura (3D) | 1–0 | FC Viikkarit (2D) | Klaukkalan urheilualue, Nurmijärvi |
| 13:30 | Murtomaa 83' (pen.) |

| 16 March 2014 | LeKi-Futis (4D) | 0–2 | Jakobstads Bollklubb (2D) | Sääksjärven tn, Lempäälä |
| 14:00 | | | Forsen 11'; Knuts 90' |

| 19 March 2014 | Bollklubben-46 (2D) | 3–3 (a.e.t.) (4–3 p) | FC Viikingit (1D) | Karis sportplan, Karis |
| 18:00 | Kuqi 90'; Soares 98'; Pihlström 100' | | Seferi 75', 93', 119' |
| | Penalties |
| | Soares (penalty scored); Brain (penalty missed); Lucas (penalty scored); Tamminen (penalty scored); Kuqi (penalty scored) | | Carlos (penalty scored); Lönnström (penalty scored); Ahonen (penalty missed); Kinnunen (penalty scored); Nyberg (penalty missed) |

| 19 March 2014 | AC Oulu (1D) | 0–4 | TPS (TD) | Raatti Stadium, Koskikeskus |
| 18:00 | | | Lehtonen 20', 69', 74'; Tamminen 90+3' |

| 19 March 2014 | Klubi-04 (2D) | 3–4 (a.e.t.) | Valkeakosken Haka (1D) | Sonera Stadium, Helsinki |
| 18:30 | Jouini 21', 26'; Pyysalo 66' | | Multanen 8' (pen.), 40', 75'; Metzger 107' |

| 19 March 2014 | Etelä-Espoon Pallo (3D) | 0–4 | JJK (1D) | Matinkylän TN 2, Espoo |
| 19:00 | | | R.Taylor 8'; Kari 19', 68'; Lehtonen 77' | Referee: Hausin Fathulla |

| 19 March 2014 | Kiffen (3D) | 1–2 (a.e.t.) | Grankulla IFK (2D) | Töölön Pallokenttä, Helsinki |
| 20:00 | Oikarinen 63' (pen.) | | Luoto 61'; Britschgi 119' |

| 22 March 2014 | FC Futura Porvoo (2D) | 0–0 (a.e.t.) (4–2 p) | Ekenäs Idrottsförening (2D) | Porvoon keskuskenttä, Porvoo |
| 16:00 | | | | Attendance: 151; Referee: Hausin Fathulla |
| | Penalties |
| | Britschgi (penalty scored); Apriamashvili (penalty scored); Ahlfors (penalty scored); Majander (penalty scored); Pösö (penalty scored) | | Penalty missed Penalty scored |

== Fifth round ==
In the fifth round, the four clubs that lose in the quarter-finals of the 2014 Finnish League Cup enter the cup. The round will be drawn on 14 March, and matches will be played between 19 March and 3 April.

| 22 March 2014 | FC Ilves (1D) | 0–3 | RoPS (TD) | Tammela Stadion, Tampere |
| 14:00 | | | Lahdenmäki 8'; Kokko 55'; Roiha 83' |

| 23 March 2014 | VIFK (2D) | 0–2 | FC Inter Turku (TD) | Hietalahti Stadium, Vaasa |
| 17:00 | | | Sirbiladze 6'; Paajanen 48' |

| 27 March 2014 | Nurmijärven Jalkapalloseura (3D) | 0–6 | Lahti (TD) | Klaukkalan urheilualue, Nurmijärvi |
| 20:00 | | | Shala 39' (pen.); Hietikko 41'; Hauhia 47'; Ngueukam 56' (pen.); Rafael 75'; Klinga 90+1' |

| 28 March 2014 | HIFK (1D) | 7–1 | FC Futura Porvoo (2D) | Töölön Pallokenttä, Helsinki |
| 20:00 | Karlsson 24'; Mustonen 36', 44', 53'; Rexhepi 39'; Peltonen 58'; Oikkonen 88' (o.g.) | | Backman 82' |

| 29 March 2014 | Jakobstads Bollklubb (2D) | 1–3 | FC Honka Espoo (TD) | Tellushalli, Jakobstad |
| 14:00 | Nyman 90+1' | | Vasara 37'; M. Hetemaj 40'; Väisänen 69' | Attendance: 295 |

| 29 March 2014 | FC Hämeenlinna (2D) | 3–2 (a.e.t.) | TPV (2D) | Pullerin tn, Hämeenlinna |
| 18:30 | 26' (o.g.); Topinoja 103', 118' | | Korsunov 64'; Koroma 103' |

| 30 March 2014 | Grankulla IFK (2D) | 0–2 | MyPa (TD) | Kauniaisten Keskuskenttä, Kauniainen |
| 12:45 | | | Dema 10', 50' |

| 1 April 2014 | Järvenpään Palloseura (2D) | 1–3 | JJK (1D) | Järvenpään keskuskenttä, Järvenpää |
| 18:00 | Kurittu 37' | | Hilska 12', 24'; Kari 23' (pen.) |

| 2 April 2014 | PS Kemi Kings (2D) | 1–1 (a.e.t.) (2–4 p) | TPS (TD) | Sauvosaari, Kemi |
| 19:00 | Bitsindou 44' | | De John 45' |
| | Penalties |
| | Smith (penalty scored); Erceg (penalty scored); Ions (penalty missed); Mansaray (penalty missed) | | Hradecky (penalty scored); Rähmönen (penalty scored); Lehtonen (penalty scored); Tamminen (penalty missed); Peltola (penalty scored) |

| 3 April 2014 | Atlantis FC (2D) | 2–0 | Bollklubben-46 (2D) | Töölön Pallokenttä, Helsinki |
| 18:30 | Äijälä 25'; Teelahti 79' |

| 4 April 2014 | HJK-j/Töölö (6D) | 0–8 | KuPS (TD) | Sonera Stadium, Helsinki |
| 18:00 | | | Ilo 14' (pen.), 19'; Purje 27', 28'; Sohna 40'; Paananen 50', 88'; Savolainen 60' |

| 5 April 2014 | SiPS (3D) | 0–5 | Haka (1D) | Ahmo urheilualue, Siilinjärvi |
| 15:00 | | | Muinonen 1'; Multanen 38', 49', 76', 85' |

== Sixth round ==
The remaining four Veikkausliiga teams entered the cup in the sixth round. The matches were played between 15 and 17 April. The draw for the sixth round was held on 1 April.

| 15 April 2014 | HIFK (1D) | 0–1 (a.e.t.) | SJK (TD) | Töölön Pallokenttä, Helsinki |
| 18:30 | | | Pelvas 103' |

| 16 April 2014 | FC Honka Espoo (TD) | 0–3 | KuPS (TD) | Tapiolan Urheilupuisto, Tapiola |
| 15:00 | | | Purje 35', 39'; Ćatović 42' |

| 16 April 2014 | FC Inter Turku (TD) | 3–0 | MyPa (TD) | Veritas Stadion, Turku |
| 17:00 | Lehtonen 37'; Sirbiladze 65'; Gruborovics 84' |

| 16 April 2014 | JJK (1D) | 1–0 | TPS (TD) | Harjun stadion, Jyväskylä |
| 17:30 | Kari 72' |

| 16 April 2014 | FC Hämeenlinna (2D) | 2–4 | IFK Mariehamn (TD) | Kaurialan kenttä, Hämeenlinna |
| 18:30 | Je. Saarinen 40'; Purosto 74' | | Forsell 45+1'; Purosto 67' (o.g.); Solignac 77', 90+2' |

| 16 April 2014 | VPS (TD) | 0–1 (a.e.t.) | FC Lahti (TD) | Hietalahti Stadium, Vaasa |
| 18:30 | | | Rafael 111' |

| 16 April 2014 | HJK (TD) | 2–0 | RoPS (TD) | Sonera Stadium, Helsinki |
| 19:00 | Kandji 8'; Baah 15' |

| 17 April 2014 | Atlantis FC (2D) | 1–4 | Haka (1D) | Töölön Pallokenttä, Helsinki |
| 17:00 | Äijälä 61' (pen.) | | Markkula 15'; Multanen 42', 71', 76' |

== Quarter-finals ==
The quarter-finals will be played on 30 April 2014. The draw for the sixth round was held on 17 April.

| 30 April 2014 | IFK Mariehamn (TD) | 2–0 | JJK (1D) | Wiklöf Holding Arena, Mariehamn |
| 17:00 | Sid 30'; Ribeiro 68' |

| 30 April 2014 | Haka (1D) | 0–3 | HJK (TD) | Tehtaan kenttä, Valkeakoski |
| 17:30 | | | Oussou 59'; Lod 76'; Alho 88' |

| 30 April 2014 | KuPS (TD) | 1–2 | FC Inter Turku (TD) | Savon Sanomat Areena, Kuopio |
| 18:00 | Markić 73' | | Hämäläinen 11'; Sirbiladze 50' |

| 30 April 2014 | SJK (TD) | 0–1 | FC Lahti (TD) | Seinäjoen keskuskenttä, Seinäjoki |
| 18:00 | | | Ngueukam 45' (pen.) |

== Semi-finals ==
The semi-finals will be played on 16 August 2014. The draw for the semi-finals was held on 20 May.

| 16 August 2014 | FC Lahti (TD) | 1–2 (a.e.t.) | FC Inter (TD) | Kisapuisto, Lahti |
| 16:00 | Ngueukam 78' | | Hämäläinen 45+2'; Sirbiladze 97' |

| 16 August 2014 | IFK Mariehamn (TD) | 1–2 | HJK (TD) | Wiklöf Holding Arena, Mariehamn |
| 19:00 | Solignac 70' | | Baah 29'; Kandji 51' |

== Final ==
The final of the 2014 Finnish Cup was played on 1 November 2014.

1 November 2014
16:00

| HJK Helsinki (TD) | 0 – 0 (a.e.t.) | FC Inter (TD) |
Penalties
| Kandji (penalty scored); Perovuo (penalty scored); Väyrynen (penalty scored); Baah (penalty scored); Savage (penalty scored) | 5-3 | Ojala (penalty scored); Aho (penalty scored); Nyman (penalty missed); Gruborovics (penalty scored) |

Sonera Stadium, Helsinki
Referee: Ville Nevalainen
