= 2025 FC Inter Turku season =

Finnish football club season

FC Inter Turku
2025 season
- Veikkausliiga: Pre-season
- Finnish Cup: Pre-season
- Finnish League Cup: Group stage
- Highest home attendance: 4,489
- Average home league attendance: 3,208
colours	colours

The 2025 season is the 36th overall and 27th consecutive in the Veikkausliiga for the Finnish football club FC Inter Turku. The club will compete in the Finnish Cup and Finnish League Cup.

== Squad ==
=== Transfers In ===
Pos.	Player	Transferred from	Fee	Date	Source
FW	(Cameroon) Antoin Essomba	(Slovakia) MŠK Žilina	Undisclosed	16 January 2025	

== Competitions ==
=== Overall record ===
Competition	First match	Last match	Starting round	Record							
Competition	First match	Last match	Starting round	Pld	W	D	L	GF	GA	GD	Win %
Veikkausliiga			Matchday 1	0	0	0	0	0	0	+0	—
Finnish Cup				0	0	0	0	0	0	+0	—
Finnish League Cup	17 January 2025		Group stage	1	0	0	1	1	2	−1	0.00
Total				1	0	0	1	1	2	−1	0.00

Last updated: 17 January 2025
Source: Competitions

=== Veikkausliiga ===
==== Table ====
Pos	Team	Pld	W	D	L	GF	GA	GD	Pts	Qualification
1	Inter Turku	22	13	7	2	46	20	+26	46	Qualification for the Championship Round
2	Ilves	22	14	3	5	47	27	+20	45	Qualification for the Championship Round
3	HJK	22	14	2	6	59	29	+30	44	Qualification for the Championship Round
4	KuPS	22	13	5	4	39	23	+16	44	Qualification for the Championship Round
5	SJK	22	12	5	5	45	31	+14	41	Qualification for the Championship Round

Source: Flashscore
Rules for classification: 1) Points; 2) Goal difference; 3) Goals scored; 4) Head-to-head points; 5) Head-to-head goal difference; 6) Head-to-head away goals scored; 7) Play-off
(Note: Play-off is only played if need to decide champion, teams for relegation or UEFA competition and will be played on a neutral ground).

==== Results summary ====
Overall								Home						Away					
Pld	W	D	L	GF	GA	GD	Pts	W	D	L	GF	GA	GD	W	D	L	GF	GA	GD
0	0	0	0	0	0	0	0	0	0	0	0	0	0	0	0	0	0	0	0

===== Results by round =====
Round	1
Ground	
Result	
Position	

A = Away; H = Home; W = Win; D = Draw; L = Loss

==== Matches ====
5 April 2025 1	Inter Turku	1-1	KuPS	Turku
16:00	Yli-Kokko (yellow card) 62'; Vasara (yellow card) 72'; Kouame 76'	Report	Oksanen (yellow card) 24'; Miettinen 53' (yellow card) 71'	Stadium: Veritas Stadion; Attendance: 3,837; Referee: (Finland) Peiman Simani

12 April 2025 2	Inter Turku	3-0	Gnistan	Turku
16:00	Kuittinen (yellow card) 15'; Niska 37'; Yli-Kokko (yellow card) 83'; Pettersson 89' (o.g.); Legbo 90+2'	Report	Eremenko (yellow card) 41'; Raitala (yellow card) 72'	Stadium: Veritas Stadion; Attendance: 2,466; Referee: (Finland) Oliver Reitala

19 April 2025 3	VPS	0-2	Inter Turku	Vaasa
14:00	Fall (yellow card) 10'	Report	Niska 31'; Sarr 57'; Vehkonen (yellow card) 89'	Stadium: Lemonsoft Stadion; Attendance: 2,481; Referee: (Finland) Peiman Simani

26 April 2025 4	Oulu	1-4	Inter Turku	Oulu
14:00	Paananen 17'; Jokelainen (yellow card) 31'; Dumbuya (yellow card) 55'; Eskelinen (red card) 64'	Report	Sarr 28'; Tuominen 36' (yellow card) 48'; Kouame 81'; Lahdensuo 88'	Stadium: Raatti Stadium; Attendance: 893; Referee: (Finland) Dennis Antamo

3 May 2025 5	Inter Turku	1-1	HJK	Turku
16:00	Essomba 73'; Granlund (yellow card) 89'; Krebs (yellow card) 90+5'	Report	Pukki 24'; Ring (yellow card) 86'	Stadium: Veritas Stadion; Attendance: 4,489; Referee: (Finland) Antti Munukka

10 May 2025 6	IFK Mariehamn	2-2	Inter Turku	Mariehamn
16:00	Toivonen 11' (yellow card) 90+5'; Olawale 71'	Report	Hämäläinen (yellow card) 55'; Straalman 70'; Legbo 83' (pen.)	Stadium: Wiklöf Holding Arena; Attendance: 1,667; Referee: (Finland) Matti Roth

17 May 2025 7	Inter Turku	3-1	Ilves	Turku
16:00	Kouame 6'; Botué (yellow card) 61'; Kuittinen (yellow card) 72'; Krebs 81'; Tuominen 89' (pen.)	Report	Veteli 9'; Stjopin (yellow card) 51'; Virtanen (yellow card) 88'	Stadium: Veritas Stadion; Attendance: 4,027; Referee: (Finland) Joni Hyytiä

25 May 2025 8	SJK	0-1	Inter Turku	Seinäjoki
17:30	Tessilimi (yellow card) 90+3'	Report	Kuittinen 11'; Granlund (yellow card) 77'; Sarr (yellow card) 80'; Krebs (yellow card) 90+3'	Stadium: OmaSP Stadion; Attendance: 3,308; Referee: (Finland) Mohammed Al Emara

1 June 2025 9	Jaro	0-1	Inter Turku	Jakobstad
17:30	Brunell (red card) 24'; Vidjeskog (yellow card) 29'; Gunnarsson (yellow card) 55'	Report	Kouame (yellow card) 44'; Sarr 61'	Stadium: Pietarsaari football stadium Attendance: 1,577; Referee: (Finland) Joona Kontinen

=== Finnish League Cup ===
==== Results by round ====
Round	1
Ground	
Result	L
Position	

Updated to match(es) played on August 2024. Source:
A = Away; H = Home; W = Win; D = Draw; L = Loss

17 January 2025 1	Inter Turku	1–2	HJK
14:00 UTC+2
