= Valdrin Rashica =

Kosovar footballer (born 1994)

Personal information
- Date of birth: 14 December 1994 (age 31)
- Place of birth: Vushtrri, FR Yugoslavia
- Height: 1.78 m (5 ft 10 in)
- Position: Midfielder

Team information
- Current team: EBK

Youth career
- –2012: Llamkos Kosova

Senior career*
Years	Team	Apps	(Gls)
2012–2014	Llamkos Kosova	27+	(2+)
2015–2016	Ekenäs SC	17	(3)
2016	Skënderbeu Korçë	1	(0)
2016–2017	Teuta Durrës	10	(0)
2017–2020	Espoo	50	(27)
2020–2021	Lahti	19	(0)
2021–2022	EIF	42	(10)
2023	PK-35	21	(2)
2024–	EBK	5	(4)
- * Club domestic league appearances and goals as of 14 May 2024

Valdrin Rashica (born 14 December 1994) is a Kosovan professional footballer who plays as a midfielder for Finnish club Esbo Bollklubb (EBK).

== Club career ==
=== Skënderbeu Korçë ===
On 9 January 2016, Rashica joined in the preparatory camp of Kategoria Superiore club Skënderbeu Korçë. On 2 February 2016, the club confirmed that Rashica had joined on a permanent transfer. On 6 April 2016, he made his debut with Skënderbeu Korçë in the 2015–16 Albanian Cup semi-final against Laçi after coming on as a substitute at 54th minute in place of Gerhard Progni.

=== Teuta Durrës ===
On 16 August 2016, Rashica signed a one-year contract with Kategoria Superiore club Teuta Durrës. On 12 September 2016, he made his debut in a 3–0 away defeat against Kukësi after coming on as a substitute at 61st minute in place of Rustem Hoxha.

=== Espoo ===
On 9 April 2017, Rashica joined Kakkonen side Espoo. Five days later, he made his debut in a 2–1 home win against FC Jazz after being named in the starting line-up. On 5 November 2018, Rashica was named the best player in Group B of Kakkonen.

=== Lahti ===
On 3 January 2020, Rashica signed a one-year contract with Veikkausliiga club Lahti. On 25 January 2020, he made his debut with Lahti in the 2020 Finnish Cup group stage against Ilves after being named in the starting line-up.

=== Ekenäs IF ===
On 1 February 2021, Rashica joined Ykkönen side Ekenäs IF. Six days later, he made his debut in the 2021 Finnish Cup group stage against TPS after being named in the starting line-up.

=== PK-35 ===
On 11 March 2023, Rashica signed with the third-tier Kakkonen club PK-35 for the 2023 season.

== Career statistics ==
As of match played 14 May 2024

Appearances and goals by club, season and competition
Club	Season	League			Cup		Other		Total	
Club	Season	Division	Apps	Goals	Apps	Goals	Apps	Goals	Apps	Goals
Llamkos Kosova	2013–14	Kosovo Superleague	27	2	—		—		27	2
Ekenäs SC	2015	Kakkonen	17	3	—		—		17	3
Skënderbeu Korçë	2015–16	Kategoria Superiore	1	0	1	0	—		2	0
Teuta Durrës	2016–17	Kategoria Superiore	10	0	4	1	—		14	1
Espoo	2017	Kakkonen	17	6	0	0	—		17	6
Espoo	2018	Kakkonen	18	10	0	0	—		18	10
Espoo	2019	Kakkonen	15	11	3	2	2	2	15	11
Espoo	Total		50	27	3	2	2	2	54	31
Lahti	2020	Veikkausliiga	19	0	7	0	—		26	0
Ekenäs IF	2021	Ykkönen	16	4	3	0	0	0	19	4
Ekenäs IF	2022	Ykkönen	26	6	3	2	5	0	34	8
Ekenäs IF	Total		42	10	6	2	5	0	53	12
PK-35	2023	Kakkonen	21	2	1	0	–		22	2
EBK	2024	Kakkonen	5	4	2	0	–		7	4
Career total			192	48	24	5	7	2	223	55
