= Eero Vuorjoki =

Finnish footballer (born 2006)

Personal information
- Full name: Eero Ilmari Vuorjoki
- Date of birth: 9 July 2006 (age 20)
- Place of birth: Finland
- Height: 1.95 m (6 ft 5 in)
- Position: Goalkeeper

Team information
- Current team: Inter Turku
- Number: 12

Youth career
- Honka

Senior career*
Years	Team	Apps	(Gls)
2022–2023	Honka II	7	(0)
2024–	Inter Turku	5	(0)
2024–	Inter Turku II	28	(0)

International career^{‡}
2023–2024	Finland U18	2	(0)
2024–	Finland U19	2	(0)
- * Club domestic league appearances and goals as of 25 July 2026 ‡ National team caps and goals as of 12 October 2024

Eero Ilmari Vuorjoki (born 9 July 2006) is a Finnish professional football player who plays as a goalkeeper for Veikkausliiga side Inter Turku.

== Club career ==
After starting his career in the Honka organisation, Vuorjoki debuted in Veikkausliiga with Inter Turku on 6 April 2024, in the opening match of the 2024 season against Gnistan.

== Career statistics ==
As of 3 October 2024.

Appearances and goals by club, season and competition
Club	Season	League			Cup		League cup		Europe		Total	
Club	Season	Division	Apps	Goals	Apps	Goals	Apps	Goals	Apps	Goals	Apps	Goals
Honka Akatemia	2023	Kakkonen	7	0	1	0	–		–		8	0
Inter Turku	2024	Veikkausliiga	4	0	0	0	5	0	–		9	0
Inter Turku	2025	Veikkausliiga	0	0	0	0	0	0	–		0	0
Inter Turku	Total		4	0	0	0	5	0	0	0	9	0
Inter Turku II	2024	Kakkonen	7	0	–		–		–		7	0
Career total			18	0	1	0	5	0	0	0	24	0

== Honours ==
Inter Turku

- Finnish League Cup: 2024, 2025
