= Miguel Grau (football manager) =

Spanish football manager (born 1984)

Personal information
- Full name: Miguel Grau Piles
- Date of birth: 22 April 1984 (age 42)
- Place of birth: Yátova, Spain

Managerial career
- Years: Team
- 2008–2010: Valencia (youth)
- 2010–2013: Levante (youth)
- 2013–2017: Valencia (youth)
- 2017–2019: Valencia B
- 2019: Almería (assistant)
- 2020–2021: Pafos (assistant)
- 2022: Inter Turku

Miguel Grau Piles (born 22 April 1984) is a Spanish football manager. He managed Valencia Mestalla in the Segunda División B from 2017 to 2019 and was assistant manager at Pafos in the Cypriot First Division. In 2022, he managed Inter Turku of the Veikkausliiga, reaching the finals of the Finnish League Cup and Finnish Cup.

== Career ==
=== Valencia ===
Born in Yátova in the Province of Valencia, Grau was managing Valencia's Juvenil A youth team when in November 2017, he was appointed manager of the reserve team in Segunda División B. He succeeded Lyuboslav Penev, who had left to contest the presidency of the Bulgarian Football Union. Grau's debut on 18 November was a 3–0 home win over Lleida with all the goals scored in a six-minute spell.

On 25 February 2019, Grau was sacked with his team in last place and five points inside the relegation zone. His final game was a 3–2 home defeat to Lleida. In June, he became the assistant of Óscar Fernández at Almería, but left in August after the club's change of ownership.

=== Pafos ===
Grau told his agency Wasserman that he wanted to manage abroad, and he was appointed as an assistant manager at Pafos in the Cypriot First Division. He served under managers Dmytro Mykhaylenko and Stephen Constantine. Unlike many managers working abroad, Grau took his wife and infant daughter to Cyprus, citing the island's low crime rate and presence of the English language.

=== Inter Turku ===
In November 2021, Grau signed for Inter Turku of the Finnish Veikkausliiga, succeeding compatriot José Riveiro on a two-year contract with the option of a third. He reached the final of the Finnish League Cup, losing 3–1 on 19 March 2022 to Honka, as well as losing the Finnish Cup final 1–0 to KuPS on 17 September of the same year. He was sacked two days later, with his assistant Ramiro Muñoz overseeing the last five games of the league season with the team in 5th.

Grau said that Finnish footballers were "methodical" and "mechanical" and needed the creativity of foreign players, which became more complicated due to points deductions for not fielding enough nationals in a team. He said that several players left in June at the halfway point in the season, and when they were preparing for a UEFA Conference League qualifier.
