= Juuso Hämäläinen =

Finnish footballer (born 1993)

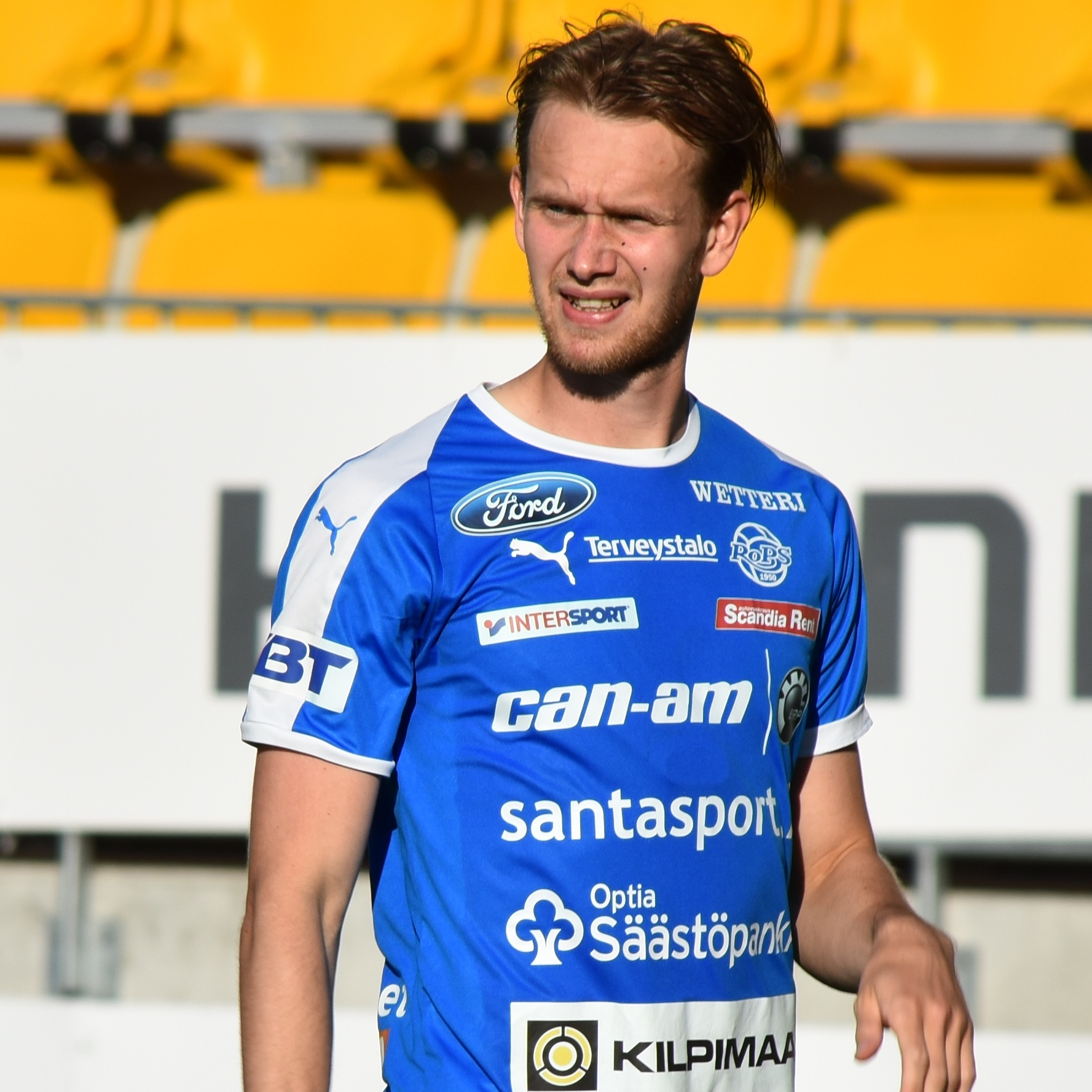
- Hämäläinen with RoPS in 2018.

Personal information
- Date of birth: 8 December 1993 (age 32)
- Place of birth: Raisio, Finland
- Position: Centre back

Team information
- Current team: Inter Turku
- Number: 3

Youth career
- Raisio Futis
- 2004–2013: Inter Turku

Senior career*
Years	Team	Apps	(Gls)
2013–2015	Inter Turku	84	(3)
2016–2018	RoPS	84	(0)
2019–	Inter Turku	136	(4)
- * Club domestic league appearances and goals as of 12 November 2026

Juuso Hämäläinen (born 8 December 1993) is a Finnish professional footballer who plays as a defender and captains Finnish Veikkausliiga club Inter Turku.

== Club career ==
Born in Raisio, Hämäläinen started football in a youth team of a local club RaiFu. He joined the Inter Turku youth sector when he was 11 years old. Hämäläinen made his senior debut with the club's first team in the 2013 Veikkausliiga season.

After a three-year stint with Rovaniemen Palloseura (RoPS), on 27 November 2018, Hämäläinen returned to his former club Inter, signing a contract initially for the 2019 season. He suffered from a knee injury in the 2022 season and was out of the line-up for months. On 17 August 2024, Hämäläinen signed a contract extension for the 2025 season, with a further one-year option.

== Career statistics ==
As of 31 March 2025

Appearances and goals by club, season and competition
Club	Season	League			Cup (Note: Includes Suomen Cup)		League cup (Note: Includes Finnish League Cup)		Europe		Total	
Club	Season	Division	Apps	Goals	Apps	Goals	Apps	Goals	Apps	Goals	Apps	Goals
Inter Turku	2013	Veikkausliiga	26	1	2	0	2	0	1 (Note: Appearance(s) in UEFA Europa League)	0	31	1
Inter Turku	2014	Veikkausliiga	31	1	4	2	2	0	–		37	3
Inter Turku	2015	Veikkausliiga	27	1	5	0	0	0	–		32	1
Inter Turku	Total		84	3	11	2	4	0	1	0	100	5
RoPS	2016	Veikkausliiga	28	0	1	0	5	0	4	0	38	0
RoPS	2017	Veikkausliiga	29	0	6	0	–		–		35	0
RoPS	2018	Veikkausliiga	27	0	2	0	–		–		29	0
RoPS	Total		84	0	9	0	5	0	4	0	102	0
Inter Turku	2019	Veikkausliiga	23	1	7	0	–		2	0	32	1
Inter Turku	2020	Veikkausliiga	14	0	5	1	–		1	0	20	1
Inter Turku	2021	Veikkausliiga	18	0	3	0	–		1 (Note: Appearance(s) in UEFA Europa Conference League)	0	22	0
Inter Turku	2022	Veikkausliiga	8	1	2	0	0	0	0	0	10	1
Inter Turku	2023	Veikkausliiga	18	0	2	0	2	0	–		22	0
Inter Turku	2024	Veikkausliiga	20	2	3	0	5	0	–		28	2
Inter Turku	2025	Veikkausliiga	0	0	0	0	3	0	–		3	0
Inter Turku	Total		101	4	22	1	10	0	1	0	134	5
Inter Turku II	2022	Kolmonen	1	0	–		–		–		1	0
Inter Turku II	2023	Kolmonen	1	0	–		–		–		1	0
Inter Turku II	Total		2	0	0	0	0	0	0	0	2	0
Career total			271	7	42	3	19	0	9	0	341	10

== Honours ==
Inter Turku

- Veikkausliiga runner-up: 2019, 2020
- Finnish Cup runner-up: 2014, 2015, 2020, 2022, 2024
- Finnish League Cup: 2024, 2025
- Finnish League Cup runner-up: 2022

RoPS

- Veikkausliiga runner-up: 2018
