= Jani Meriläinen =

Finnish footballer and goalkeeping coach (born 1974)

Personal information
- Date of birth: 18 July 1974 (age 52)
- Place of birth: Rovaniemi, Finland
- Height: 1.81 m (5 ft 11 in)
- Position: Goalkeeper

Youth career
- RoPS

Senior career*
Years	Team	Apps	(Gls)
1992–2000	RoPS	87	(0)
2001–2002	Inter Turku	20	(0)
2002	→ Närpes Kraft (loan)	4	(0)
2003	KooTeePee	12	(0)

Managerial career
- 2004–2020: Inter Turku (goalkeeping coach)
- 2021–2022: Inter Turku (sporting director)
- * Club domestic league appearances and goals

Jani Meriläinen (born 18 July 1974) is a Finnish football coach and a former footballer who played as a goalkeeper. He is currently working for Inter Turku youth sector and for the development of goalkeeping coaching in the club.

== Playing career ==
Born in Rovaniemi, Meriläinen started football in a local club RoPS. He played in Veikkausliiga with the RoPS first team, Inter Turku and KooTeePee. He retired as a player after the 2003 season.

== Coaching career ==
Meriläinen worked as a goalkeeping coach for Inter Turku during 2004–2020. He was the club's sporting director in 2021–2022.
