= Fernando Della Sala =

Argentine retired footballer

Personal information
- Full name: Fernando Ariel Della Sala
- Date of birth: 10 June 1976 (age 50)
- Place of birth: Argentina
- Position: Defender

Senior career*
Years	Team	Apps	(Gls)
1997-2000	Chacarita Juniors	56	(1)
2000-2003	FC Inter Turku	82	(8)
- Club Náutico Rumipal
- Atlético Talleres de Berrotarán
- Club Náutico Rumipal
- * Club domestic league appearances and goals

Fernando Della Sala (born 10 June 1976) is an Argentine retired footballer who is last known to have played for Club Náutico Rumipal in his home country.

== Career ==
Della Sala started his senior career with Chacarita Juniors in 1997. In 2000, he signed for Inter Turku in the Finnish Veikkausliiga, where he made eighty-two league appearances and scored eight goals. After that, he played for Argentinean clubs Club Náutico Rumipal and Atlético Talleres de Berrotarán before retiring.
