= Bart Straalman =

Dutch footballer (born 1996)

Personal information
- Date of birth: 22 August 1996 (age 30)
- Place of birth: Winterswijk, Netherlands
- Height: 1.93 m (6 ft 4 in)
- Position: Centre back

Team information
- Current team: Liepāja
- Number: 2

Youth career
- –2014: De Graafschap

Senior career*
Years	Team	Apps	(Gls)
2014–2019	De Graafschap	114	(6)
2016–2018	Jong De Graafschap	14	(0)
2019	Sarpsborg 08	2	(1)
2020	Rodez	4	(0)
2020–2023	Grenoble	34	(1)
2024	MFK Vyškov	10	(0)
2024–2025	Inter Turku	31	(2)
2024	Inter Turku II	1	(0)
2026–	Liepāja	30	(0)
- * Club domestic league appearances and goals as of 12 November 2026

Bart Straalman (born 22 August 1996) is a Dutch professional footballer who plays as a centre back for Latvian Higher League club Liepāja. Besides the Netherlands, he has played in Norway, France, the Czech Republic and Finland.

== Club career ==
Born Winterswijk, Straalman is a youth product from De Graafschap. Straalman made his first team debut on 8 November 2014 in an Eerste Divisie game against Sparta Rotterdam replacing Vlatko Lazić after 87 minutes in a 3–2 home win.

On 11 July 2019, Straalman signed for Norwegian Eliteserien club Sarpsborg 08 on a contract until the end of the 2019 season.

In April 2020, having made just four appearances for Ligue 2 side Rodez AF before the season was ended early due to COVID-19 pandemic, Straalman agreed a two-contract with league rivals Grenoble Foot 38 which he would join for the 2020–21 season.

In August 2024, Straalman joined Veikkausliiga club Inter Turku on a contract until the end of the 2025 season.

== Career statistics ==
As of 31 March 2024.

Appearances and goals by club, season and competition
Club	Season	League			Cup (Note: Includes KNVB Cup, Coupe de France and Suomen Cup)		Other		Total	
Club	Season	Division	Apps	Goals	Apps	Goals	Apps	Goals	Apps	Goals
De Graafschap	2014–15	Eerste Divisie	24	1	1	0	5	0	30	1
De Graafschap	2015–16	Eredivisie	19	2	1	0	2	0	22	2
De Graafschap	2016–17	Eerste Divisie	22	3	0	0	–		22	3
De Graafschap	2017–18	Eerste Divisie	23	0	0	0	4	0	27	0
De Graafschap	2018–19	Eredivisie	26	1	2	0	4	0	32	1
De Graafschap	Total		114	7	4	0	15	0	133	4
Jong De Graafschap	2016–17	Derde Divisie	5	0	–		–		5	0
Jong De Graafschap	2017–18	Derde Divisie	7	0	–		–		7	0
Jong De Graafschap	Total		12	0	0	0	0	0	12	0
Sarpsborg	2019	Eliteserien	2	1	–		–		2	1
Rodez	2019–20	Ligue 2	4	0	–		–		4	0
Grenoble	2020–21	Ligue 2	19	1	2	0	–		21	1
Grenoble	2021–22	Ligue 2	15	0	0	0	–		15	0
Grenoble	2022–23	Ligue 2	0	0	0	0	–		0	0
Grenoble	Total		34	1	2	0	0	0	36	1
MFK Vyškov	2023–24	FNL	10	0	0	0	2	0	12	0
Inter Turku	2024	Veikkausliiga	3	0	1	0	0	0	4	0
Inter Turku	2025	Veikkausliiga	0	0	0	0	3	0	3	0
Inter Turku	Total		3	0	1	0	3	0	7	0
Inter Turku II	2024	Kakkonen	1	0	–		–		1	0
Career total			180	9	7	0	20	0	207	9

== Honours ==
Inter Turku

- Finnish Cup runner-up: 2024
- Finnish League Cup: 2025
