= Florian Krebs (footballer, born 1999) =

German footballer

Personal information
- Date of birth: 4 February 1999 (age 27)
- Place of birth: Berlin, Germany
- Height: 1.87 m (6 ft 2 in)
- Position: Midfielder

Team information
- Current team: CSKA 1948
- Number: 23

Youth career
- –2006: BFC Alemannia 1890
- 2006–2018: Hertha BSC

Senior career*
Years	Team	Apps	(Gls)
2018–2020	Hertha BSC II	32	(5)
2020	Chemnitzer FC	6	(0)
2020–2022	Borussia Dortmund II	25	(1)
2022–2023	Honka	52	(4)
2024–2025	Inter Turku	55	(8)
2026–	CSKA 1948	16	(1)
- * Club domestic league appearances and goals as of 11 June 2026

Florian Krebs (born 4 February 1999) is a German professional footballer who plays as a midfielder for Bulgarian First League club CSKA 1948 Sofia.

== Career ==
=== Youth career ===
Krebs played for BFC Alemannia 90 in his hometown Berlin and was subsequently admitted to the youth team of Bundesliga club Hertha BSC. In the 2017–18 season, Krebs became the captain of the under-19 team, playing in 24 matches and scoring 13 goals. After a victory over Schalke 04 II, he won the Under 19 Bundesliga with the team.

=== Hertha Berlin II ===
Krebs scored 3 goals in 26 competitive matches in his first year of being professional with Hertha BSC II.

=== Chemnitzer FC ===
From August 2019, Krebs suffered from an ankle injury until the end of the first half of the season and was then signed during the winter break by 3. Liga club Chemnitzer FC, with whom he signed a contract that was valid until the end of the season. He debuted in matchday 29 (3 June 2020) of the 2019–20 3. Liga season, in a 1–0 defeat against Sonnenhof Großaspach, coming on in the 71st minute for Tarsis Bonga. He appeared in the starting lineup in a 2–1 defeat at MSV Duisburg, playing for 52 minutes until being replaced by Bonga.

=== Borussia Dortmund II ===
On 25 July 2020, Krebs joined Borussia Dortmund II.

=== Honka ===
On 17 January 2022, he moved to Honka in Finland. After Honka was suddenly declared for bankruptcy in the end of the 2023 season, Krebs was released.

=== Inter Turku ===
On 9 January 2024, Krebs signed a two-year deal with fellow Veikkausliiga club Inter Turku, reuniting with his previous Honka head coach Vesa Vasara.

== Career statistics ==
As of 11 June 2026

Appearances and goals by club, season and competition
Club	Season	League			National cup (Note: Includes Finnish Cup)		League cup (Note: Includes Finnish League Cup)		Continental		Total	
Club	Season	Division	Apps	Goals	Apps	Goals	Apps	Goals	Apps	Goals	Apps	Goals
Hertha BSC II	2018–19	Regionalliga Nordost	26	3	–		–		–		26	3
Hertha BSC II	2019–20	Regionalliga Nordost	6	2	–		–		–		6	2
Hertha BSC II	Total		32	5	–	–	–	–	–	–	32	5
Chemnitzer FC	2019–20	3. Liga	6	0	–		–		–		6	0
Borussia Dortmund II	2020–21	Regionalliga West	22	1	–		–		–		22	1
Borussia Dortmund II	2021–22	3. Liga	2	0	–		–		–		2	0
Borussia Dortmund II	Total		24	1	–	–	–	–	–	–	24	1
Honka	2022	Veikkausliiga	24	4	1	0	5	1	–		30	5
Honka	2023	Veikkausliiga	28	0	4	0	5	0	1 (Note: Includes UEFA Europa Conference League)	0	38	0
Honka	Total		52	4	5	0	10	1	1	0	68	5
Inter Turku	2024	Veikkausliiga	26	3	5	0	7	0	–		38	3
Inter Turku	2025	Veikkausliiga	29	5	1	0	7	1	–		37	6
Inter Turku	Total		55	8	6	0	14	1	0	0	75	9
CSKA 1948 Sofia	2025–26	Bulgarian First League	16	1	1	0	–		–		17	1
Career total			185	17	12	0	18	1	7	1	221	19

== Honours ==
Hertha BSC U19

- Under 19 Bundesliga: 2018

Borussia Dortmund II

- Regionalliga West: 2020–21

Honka

- Finnish League Cup: 2022
- Finnish Cup runner-up: 2023

Inter Turku

- Finnish League Cup: 2024, 2025
- Finnish Cup runner-up: 2024
