= Ramiro Muñoz =

Spanish football coach (born 1994)

Personal information
- Full name: Ramiro Muñoz Calvo
- Date of birth: 10 February 1994 (age 32)
- Place of birth: Madrid, Spain
- Position: Centre back

Team information
- Current team: Olimpija Ljubljana (assistant)

Senior career*
Years	Team	Apps	(Gls)
- ED Moratalaz

Managerial career
- 2019: VJS (assistant)
- 2021: SJK (assistant)
- 2022–2024: Inter Turku (assistant)
- 2022: Inter Turku (caretaker)
- 2024–2025: Finland U21 (assistant)
- 2025–: Olimpija Ljubljana (assistant)
- * Club domestic league appearances and goals as of 27 March 2024

Ramiro Muñoz Calvo (born 10 February 1994) is a Spanish football coach and a former player, currently an assistant for Slovenian club Olimpija Ljubljana.

== Playing career ==
Muñoz has played for ED Moratalaz in his native Spain.

== Career ==
After moving to Finland in 2014, Muñoz has worked as a teacher in Vierumäki Sports Center in Vierumäki. He has also worked as a youth and assistant coach for Helsingin Palloseura and Vantaan Jalkapalloseura. During the 2021 season, he worked as an assistant coach of Veikkausliiga club SJK Seinäjoki with manager Jani Honkavaara.

On 6 November 2021, Muñoz was named the assistant coach of Miguel Grau for fellow Veikkausliiga club Inter Turku. After Grau was dismissed in September 2022, Muñoz was named the caretaker manager for the rest of the season. He continued as assistant coach for the 2023 and 2024 seasons under head coaches Jarkko Wiss and Vesa Vasara, and his departure from Inter was announced in late September 2024.

On 29 January 2024, Muñoz was appointed an assistant coach of the Finland U21 national team in the coaching staff of Mika Lehkosuo, focusing on the set pieces. They went on to qualify for the 2025 UEFA European Under-21 Championship final tournament, for the second time in the nation's history.

In January 2025, he also started as an assistant coach of Slovenian club Olimpija Ljubljana, in a coaching staff of Víctor Sánchez.

== Personal life ==
Muñoz is a fluent Finnish speaker.

== Managerial statistics ==
As of 27 October 2024

Team	Nat	From	To	Record				
Team	Nat	From	To	G	W	D	L	Win %
Inter Turku (Note: caretaker manager)	(Finland)	20 September 2022	31 December 2022	6	1	0	5	16.67
Total				6	1	0	5	16.67
