= Alban Ferati =

Finnish footballer (born 1991)

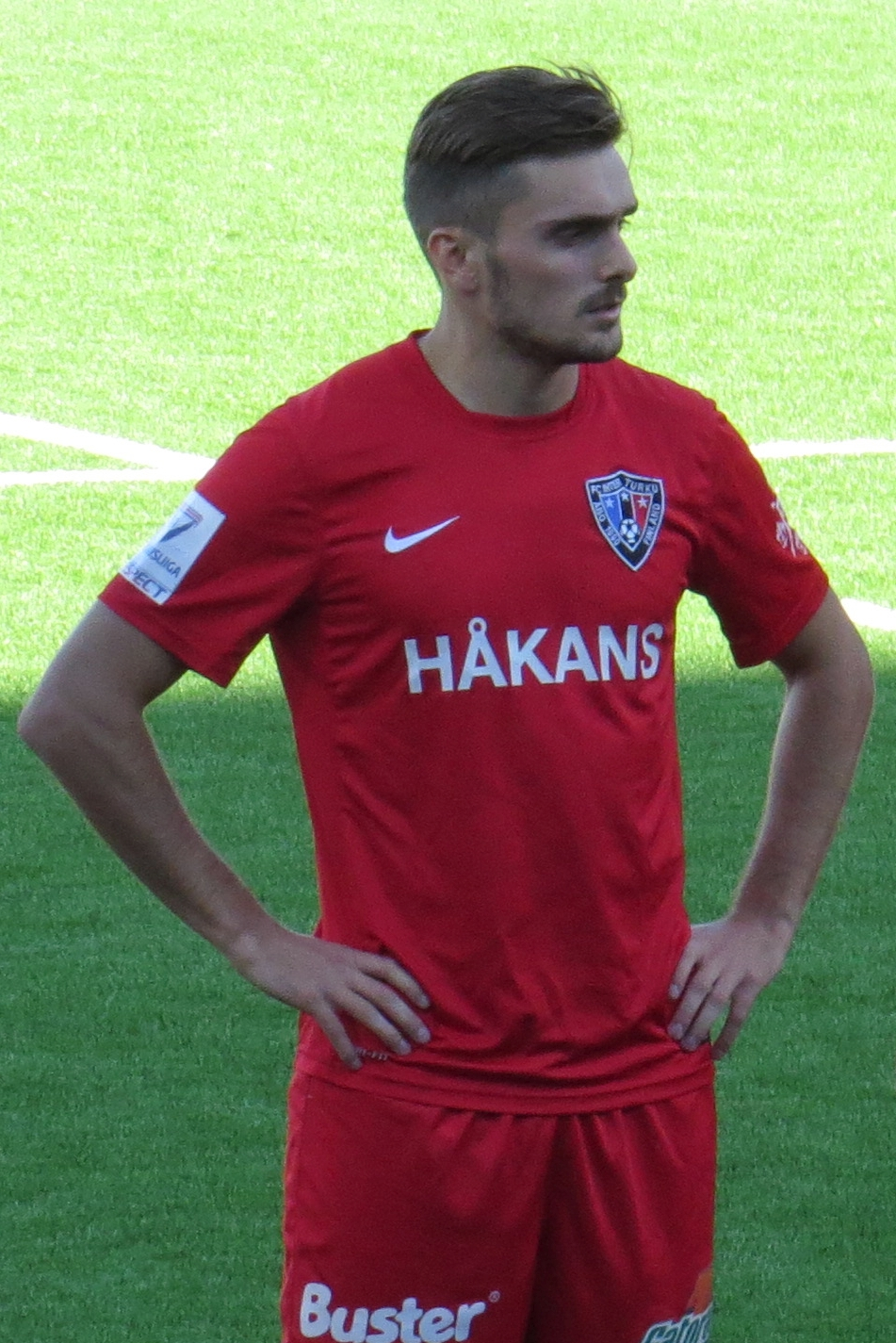
- Ferati with Inter Turku in 2015

Personal information
- Date of birth: 1 November 1991 (age 35)
- Place of birth: Mitrovica, Kosovo, SFR Yugoslavia
- Height: 1.77 m (5 ft 10 in)
- Position: Forward

Youth career
- 2003–2008: Inter Turku

Senior career*
| Years | Team | Apps | (Gls) |
| 2007 | VG-62 | 8 | (1) |
| 2008 | Sinimustat | 20 | (3) |
| 2009–2010 | TPS | 3 | (0) |
| 2009–2010 | → Åbo IFK (loan) | 41 | (11) |
| 2011–2015 | Åbo IFK | 71 | (40) |
| 2015–2016 | Inter Turku | 16 | (1) |
| 2016 | → SalPa (loan) | 1 | (1) |
| 2021–2022 | Peimari United | 18 | (6) |
- * Club domestic league appearances and goals

Alban Ferati (born 1 November 1991) is a Finnish footballer. Since 2015, he has also played futsal for Turku-based club KF Kosova, winning promotion to Futsal-Liiga in 2025. Ferati has made 19 appearances in Finnish top-tier Veikkausliiga for Turun Palloseura and Inter Turku, scoring one goal.
