= Josh Mulvany =

English footballer

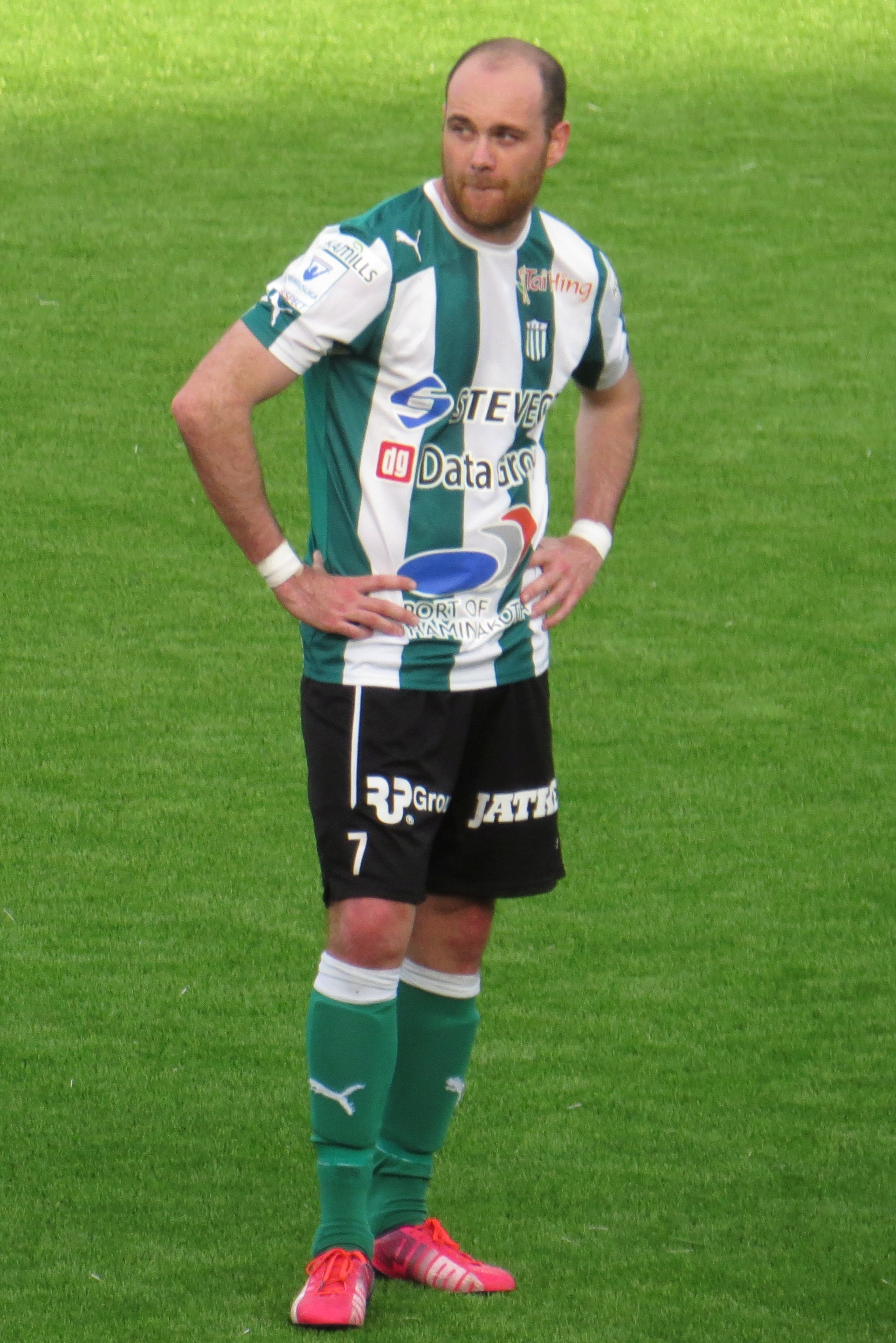

Personal information
- Full name: Joshua Paul Mulvany
- Date of birth: 26 December 1988 (age 37)
- Place of birth: Oxford, England
- Position: Midfielder

Youth career
- 2001–2005: Southampton
- 2006: Wycombe Wanderers
- 2006–2007: Oxford United

College career
Years	Team	Apps	(Gls)
2008–2010	Louisburg College	22	(6)
2010–2011	Kentucky Wildcats	20	(3)

Senior career*
Years	Team	Apps	(Gls)
2007–2008	Didcot Town	30	(1)
2012	Ekenäs IF	14	(3)
2012–2013	Oxford City	8	(0)
2013	KooTeePee	21	(2)
2014–2015	KTP	34	(4)
2015	→ Ekenäs IF (loan)	10	(1)

International career
2003	Scotland U16		
2004	England U18		
- * Club domestic league appearances and goals as of 22:40, 6 July 2018 (UTC)

Joshua Paul Mulvany (born 26 December 1988) is an English professional footballer who last played as a midfielder for KTP.

== Career ==
Mulvany began his footballing career in the academies of Southampton, Wycombe Wanderers and Oxford United before signing for Southern League club Didcot Town in 2007.

In 2008, Mulvany played college soccer for Louisburg College, before moving to the Kentucky Wildcats in 2010.

In the winter of 2012, Mulvany signed for National League North side Oxford City. Mulvany made eight appearances during his time at the club.

In 2013, after a short spell with Ekenäs IF in the second half of 2012, Mulvany moved back to Finland and signed with KooTeePee. In 2014, Mulvany moved to KTP. Mulvany won the club's Player of the Year award as the club achieved promotion to the Veikkausliiga.
