= Jusu Karvonen =

Finnish footballer (born 1993)

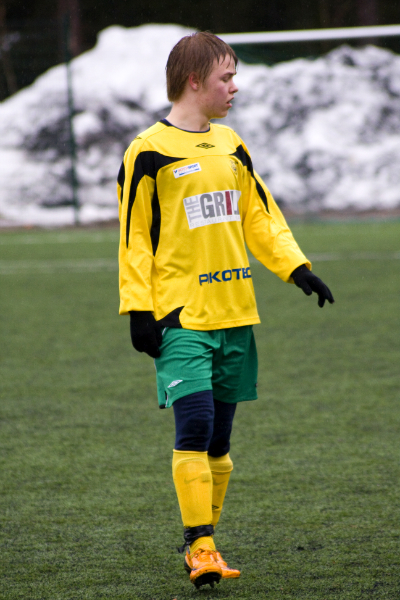

Personal information
- Date of birth: 17 January 1993 (age 33)
- Place of birth: Tampere, Finland
- Height: 1.76 m (5 ft 9 1/2 in)
- Position: Midfielder

Team information
- Current team: Taranto

Senior career*
Years	Team	Apps	(Gls)
2009–2010	Tampere United	20	(0)
2010–	Taranto	0	(0)
2011	→ Cesena (loan)	0	(0)
2012	→ FC Haka (loan)	1	(0)

International career
2009–2010	Finland U-17	13	(2)
- * Club domestic league appearances and goals as of 16 May 2012

Jusu Karvonen (born 17 January 1993) is a Finnish footballer, who currently plays for FC Haka on loan from Taranto Calcio.

== Career ==
On his debut season Karvonen played in 12 games Veikkausliiga at the age of 16. He also played 3 Finnish Cup games. Karvonen has had trials with Serie A giants F.C. Internazionale Milano. In December 2009 Karvonen joined Atalanta's training camp. In January 2011 he moved to the youth team of the Serie A club A.C. Cesena, on loan from Taranto Calcio.

Karvonen has represented Finnish U-17 national football team.
