= Eemil Laamanen =

Finnish footballer (born 2005)

Personal information
- Date of birth: 28 August 2005 (age 21)
- Place of birth: Lahti, Finland
- Position: Centre back

Team information
- Current team: Lahti

Youth career
- Kuusysi
- –2019: Reipas Lahti
- 2019–2022: Lahti

Senior career*
Years	Team	Apps	(Gls)
2023–	Reipas Lahti	22	(2)
2023–	Lahti	7	(0)
2024	→ JäPS (loan)	5	(0)

International career^{‡}
2023–	Finland U18	1	(0)
- * Club domestic league appearances and goals as of 23 November 2025 ‡ National team caps and goals as of 21 January 2024

Eemil Laamanen (born 28 August 2005) is a Finnish professional footballer who plays as a centre back for Veikkausliiga club Lahti.

== Career ==
Laamanen signed his first professional contract with FC Lahti on 12 April 2023, on a two-year deal with an option to extend. He debuted in Veikkausliiga with FC Lahti first team on 22 April 2023, in a 0–0 away draw against SJK.

At the start of the 2024 season, Laamanen was loaned out to Järvenpään Palloseura (JäPS) in second-tier Ykkösliiga until July.

== International career ==
Laamanen was part of the Finland U18 squad winning the friendly tournament Baltic Cup in June 2023.

== Career statistics ==
As of 1 April 2025

Appearances and goals by club, season and competition
Club	Season	League			Cup (Note: Includes Suomen Cup)		League cup (Note: Includes Finnish League Cup and Ykkösliigacup)		Europe		Total	
Club	Season	Division	Apps	Goals	Apps	Goals	Apps	Goals	Apps	Goals	Apps	Goals
Reipas Lahti	2023	Kakkonen	16	2	–		–		–		16	2
Lahti	2023	Veikkausliiga	1	0	3	0	3	0	–		7	0
Lahti	2024	Veikkausliiga	0	0	0	0	1	0	–		1	0
Lahti	2025	Ykkösliiga	0	0	0	0	5	0	–		5	0
Lahti	Total		1	0	3	0	9	0	0	0	13	0
JäPS (loan)	2024	Ykkösliiga	5	0	1	0	2	0	–		8	0
Career total			6	0	4	0	11	0	0	0	21	0

== Honours ==
Finland U18

- Baltic Cup: 2023
