= Jussi Äijälä =

Finnish footballer (born 1988)

Personal information
- Date of birth: 27 November 1988 (age 37)
- Place of birth: Oulu, Finland
- Height: 1.71 m (5 ft 7 1/2 in)
- Position: Defender

Youth career
- OLS

Senior career*
Years	Team	Apps	(Gls)
2006–2007	OPS-jp		
2008	AC Oulu	23	(0)
2009–2011	VSP	44	(1)
2011–2012	FC PoPa	13	(0)
2011	→ LoPa (loan)	3	(0)
2012–2016	Atlantis FC	89	(13)
- * Club domestic league appearances and goals as of 13 May 2017 (UTC)

Jussi Äijälä (born 27 November 1988) is a Finnish footballer.
