= Axel Kouame =

Ivorian footballer (born 2003)

Personal information
- Full name: Axel Guy Herve Kouame
- Date of birth: 14 October 2003 (age 23)
- Place of birth: Abidjan, Ivory Coast
- Height: 1.78 m (5 ft 10 in)
- Position: Attacking midfielder

Team information
- Current team: AIK
- Number: 48

Youth career
- Sporting Football des Cascades

Senior career*
Years	Team	Apps	(Gls)
2023	Inter Turku II	4	(3)
2023–2025	Inter Turku	49	(5)
2025–	AIK	26	(6)
- * Club domestic league appearances and goals as of 3 November 2026

Axel Guy Herve Kouame (born 14 October 2003) is an Ivorian professional footballer who plays as a attacking midfielder for Allsvenskan club AIK.

== Club career ==
Kouame grew up in Yopougon area of Abidjan, Ivory Coast. Later he played in the academy of Sporting Football des Cascades in Burkina Faso.

=== Inter Turku ===
Kouame spent time in Belgium with several clubs on trials, before on 11 August 2023, Inter Turku in Finland announced that they had signed with Kouame on a deal until the end of 2024, with an option for an additional year, for an undisclosed fee. Two days later, on 13 August, he debuted with his new club in Veikkausliiga, in a 1–0 away loss against Honka.

Kouame scored his first goal for Inter Turku on 27 January 2024, in a Finnish League Cup win over Lahti. He totalled seven appearances and two goals during the campaign, and helped Inter to win the Finnish League Cup title in 2024. On 16 August, Kouame scored his first Veikkausliiga goal on a penalty spot, a winning goal in a 3–0 home win over SJK Seinäjoki. After his contract option was first exercised in September, on 16 March 2025 Kouame extended his deal with Inter until the end of 2026.

=== AIK ===
On 29 August 2025, Allsvenskan club AIK signed Kouame on a four-and-a-half years contract. According to media, the transfer fee was over 10 million SEK, which corresponds to around €1 million.

== Career statistics ==
As of 3 November 2026

Appearances and goals by club, season, and competition
Club	Season	League			National cup (Note: Includes Suomen Cup and Svenska Cupen)		League cup		Europe		Total	
Club	Season	Division	Apps	Goals	Apps	Goals	Apps	Goals	Apps	Goals	Apps	Goals
Inter Turku II	2023	Kolmonen	4	3	—		—		—		4	3
Inter Turku	2023	Veikkausliiga	6	0	—		—		—		6	0
Inter Turku	2024	Veikkausliiga	22	1	5	2	7	2	—		34	5
Inter Turku	2025	Veikkausliiga	21	4	2	0	7	3	–		30	7
Inter Turku	Total		49	5	7	2	14	5	0	0	70	12
AIK	2025	Allsvenskan	6	0	2	0	–		–		8	0
AIK	2026	Allsvenskan	20	6	0	0	–		–		20	6
AIK	Total		26	6	2	0	0	0	0	0	28	6
Career total			79	14	9	2	14	5	0	0	102	21

== Honours ==
Inter Turku

- Finnish Cup runner-up: 2024
- Finnish League Cup: 2024, 2025
