= Momodou Sarr =

Finnish footballer (born 2000)

Personal information
- Date of birth: 31 March 2000 (age 26)
- Place of birth: Vaasa, Finland
- Height: 1.88 m (6 ft 2 in)
- Positions: Winger; striker

Team information
- Current team: Lahti
- Number: 77

Youth career
- –2017: VPS

Senior career*
Years	Team	Apps	(Gls)
2018–2020	VPS II	26	(22)
2018–2020	VPS	50	(7)
2021–2022	Ilves	35	(0)
2022–2024	Gnistan	58	(14)
2024–2026	Kolding	19	(1)
2025	→ Inter Turku (loan)	28	(4)
2026–	Lahti	24	(3)

International career
2021	Finland U21	4	(0)
- * Club domestic league appearances and goals as of 13 November 2026

Momodou Sarr (born 31 March 2000) is a Finnish professional footballer who plays for FC Lahti as a striker.

== Club career ==
Sarr played in the youth sector of his hometown club Vaasan Palloseura (VPS), before debuting in senior level on 25 April 2018 with the club's first team, in a 1–1 Veikkausliiga draw against Ilves.

In early 2021, Sarr joined Ilves in Veikkausliiga on a two-year deal.

On 21 July 2022, Sarr moved to Gnistan in second-tier Ykkönen. He was named the Ykkönen Player of the Month in June 2023, after scoring five goals and providing two assists in four matches. At the end of the 2023 season, Gnistan won promotion to Veikkausliiga, and Sarr's contract was extended for the 2024 season.

On 1 August 2024, Sarr joined Danish 1st Division club Kolding IF for an undisclosed fee. On 2 April 2025, he was loaned to Inter Turku. Sarr left Inter and returned to Kolding at the end of th loan spell.

On 5 February 2026, Sarr joined Finnish Veikkausliiga club FC Lahti.

== International career ==
Sarr has represented Finland at under-21 international level on four occasions in 2021.

== Personal life ==
Born and raised in Vaasa, Finland, Sarr is also of Gambian descent.

== Career statistics ==
As of 13 November 2026

Appearances and goals by club, season and competition
Club	Season	League			National cup (Note: Includes Suomen Cup and Danish Cup)		League cup (Note: Includes Finnish League Cup and Ykkönen Cup)		Other		Total	
Club	Season	Division	Apps	Goals	Apps	Goals	Apps	Goals	Apps	Goals	Apps	Goals
VPS Akatemia	2018	Kolmonen	20	19	–		–		1 (Note: Includes UEFA Regions' Cup)	0	21	19
VPS Akatemia	2019	Kakkonen	4	2	–		–		–		4	2
VPS Akatemia	2020	Kolmonen	2	1	–		–		–		2	1
VPS Akatemia	Total		26	22	0	0	0	0	1	0	27	22
VPS	2018	Veikkausliiga	3	0	–		–		–		3	0
VPS	2019	Veikkausliiga	26	4	8	2	–		–		34	6
VPS	2020	Ykkönen	21	3	4	2	–		–		25	5
VPS	Total		50	7	12	4	0	0	0	0	62	11
Ilves	2021	Veikkausliiga	24	0	1	0	–		–		25	0
Ilves	2022	Veikkausliiga	11	0	2	1	0	0	–		13	1
Ilves	Total		35	0	3	1	0	0	0	0	38	1
Gnistan	2022	Ykkönen	12	5	–		–		–		12	5
Gnistan	2023	Ykkönen	29	8	2	1	6	3	–		37	12
Gnistan	2024	Veikkausliiga	17	1	0	0	5	3	–		22	4
Gnistan	Total		58	14	2	1	11	6	0	0	71	21
Kolding	2024–25	Danish 1st Division	19	1	6	0	–		–		25	1
Inter Turku (loan)	2025	Veikkausliiga	28	4	1	1	0	0	–		29	5
FC Lahti	2026	Veikkausliiga	24	3	3	1	3	0	–		30	4
Career total			240	51	27	8	14	6	1	0	282	65

== Honours ==
Gnistan

- Ykkönen runner-up: 2023

Individual

- Ykkönen Player of the Month: June 2023
