= Luka Kuittinen =

Finnish footballer (born 2003)

Personal information
- Full name: Luka Valtteri Kuittinen
- Date of birth: 29 March 2003 (age 23)
- Place of birth: Rovaniemi, Finland
- Height: 1.90 m (6 ft 3 in)
- Position: Centre back

Team information
- Current team: Inter Turku
- Number: 22

Youth career
- RoPS
- TP-47
- –2020: RoPS

Senior career*
| Years | Team | Apps | (Gls) |
| 2020 | RoPS II | 11 | (1) |
| 2021 | RoPS | 29 | (3) |
| 2022– | Inter Turku | 110 | (8) |
| 2022–2024 | Inter Turku II | 11 | (2) |
| 2023 | → SalPa (loan) | 4 | (0) |

International career^{‡}
| 2021 | Finland U19 | 3 | (0) |
| 2025 | Finland U21 | 2 | (0) |
- * Club domestic league appearances and goals as of 12 November 2026 ‡ National team caps and goals as of 25 March 2025

Luka Valtteri Kuittinen (born 29 March 2003) is a Finnish professional football defender for Veikkausliiga club Inter Turku.

== Club career ==
Born in Rovaniemi, Kuittinen started football in a youth sector of a local club Rovaniemen Palloseura (RoPS). He made a senior debut with the club's reserve team in third-tier Kakkonen in the 2020 season. Next season, he played for RoPS first team in the second-tier Ykkönen, but was released after the season among other players due to club's financial problems which caused RoPS to be demoted to Kakkonen.

On 26 December 2021, he signed a three-year deal with Veikkausliiga club Inter Turku. Kuittinen debuted in the league in the 2022 season, and scored his first league goal on 7 June 2024, in a 2–0 away win against Lahti. He was named in the Veikkausliiga Team of the Month in June 2024. On 12 September 2024, he signed a two-year contract extension with Inter.

== International career ==
Kuittinen has represented Finland U19 national team on one occasion in 2021.

In the late August 2024, Kuittinen received his first call-up to the Finland U21 national team.

== Career statistics ==
As of 12 November 2026

Appearances and goals by club, season and competition
| Club | Season | League | | | Cup (Note: Includes Suomen Cup) | | League cup | | Europe | | Total | |
| Club | Season | Division | Apps | Goals | Apps | Goals | Apps | Goals | Apps | Goals | Apps | Goals |
|---|---|---|---|---|---|---|---|---|---|---|---|---|
| RoPS II | 2020 | Kakkonen | 11 | 1 | 3 | 1 | – | | – | | 14 | 2 |
| RoPS | 2021 | Ykkönen | 29 (Note: Includes two appearances in Veikkausliiga promotion play-offs) | 3 | 4 | 0 | – | | – | | 33 | 3 |
| Inter Turku II | 2022 | Kolmonen | 4 | 0 | – | | – | | – | | 4 | 0 |
| Inter Turku II | 2023 | Kolmonen | 5 | 1 | – | | – | | – | | 5 | 1 |
| Inter Turku II | 2024 | Kakkonen | 2 | 1 | – | | – | | – | | 2 | 1 |
| Inter Turku II | Total | | 11 | 2 | 0 | 0 | 0 | 0 | 0 | 0 | 11 | 2 |
| Inter Turku | 2022 | Veikkausliiga | 18 | 0 | 3 | 0 | 2 | 0 | 1 (Note: Appearance(s) in UEFA Conference League) | 0 | 24 | 0 |
| Inter Turku | 2023 | Veikkausliiga | 13 | 0 | 3 | 1 | 6 | 1 | – | | 22 | 2 |
| Inter Turku | 2024 | Veikkausliiga | 23 | 3 | 6 | 0 | 4 | 0 | – | | 33 | 3 |
| Inter Turku | 2025 | Veikkausliiga | 29 | 4 | 1 | 0 | 6 | 0 | – | | 36 | 4 |
| Inter Turku | 2026 | Veikkausliiga | 27 | 1 | 4 | 0 | 6 | 0 | 7 | 0 | 44 | 1 |
| Inter Turku | Total | | 110 | 8 | 17 | 1 | 24 | 1 | 8 | 0 | 121 | 9 |
| SalPa (loan) | 2023 | Ykkönen | 4 | 0 | – | | – | | – | | 4 | 0 |
| Career total | | | 165 | 14 | 24 | 2 | 24 | 1 | 8 | 0 | 221 | 17 |

== Honours ==
RoPS

- Ykkönen runner-up: 2021

Inter Turku

- Finnish Cup runner-up: 2022, 2024
- Finnish League Cup: 2024, 2025, 2026
- Finnish League Cup runner-up: 2022
