= Ari-Pekka =

Ari-Pekka is a Finnish-language compound given name, composed of Ari and Pekka. Notable people with the name include:

- Ari-Pekka Liukkonen (born 1989), Finnish swimmer
- Ari-Pekka Nikkola (born 1969), Finnish ski jumper
- Ari-Pekka Nurmenkari (born 1983), Finnish figure skater
- Ari-Pekka Selin (born 1963), Finnish ice hockey player and coach
