= Ville Seppä =

Finnish footballer (born 1995)

Personal information
- Full name: Ville Markus Sakari Seppä
- Date of birth: 2 May 1996 (age 30)
- Place of birth: Loimaa, Finland
- Height: 1.85 m (6 ft 1 in)
- Position: Goalkeeper

Team information
- Current team: Inter Turku
- Number: 36

Youth career
- –2014: Inter Turku

Senior career*
Years	Team	Apps	(Gls)
2014	Inter Turku	0	(0)
2014	→ SalPa (loan)	15	(0)
2015	→ Åbo IFK (loan)	12	(0)
2016	SalPa	10	(0)
2016	→ Wilpas	1	(0)
2016	Futura	5	(0)
2017	TPS	0	(0)
2018	Hercules	17	(0)
2019	Jaro	15	(0)
2019	→ JBK	2	(0)
2020	Nyköpings BIS	14	(0)
2021	TPS Akatemia	3	(0)
2021	Assyriska IK	5	(0)
2022	Team ThorenGruppen	4	(0)
2022–2023	KPV	28	(0)
2024	Inter Turku	2	(0)
2024	Ilves	4	(0)
2025	Bremer SV	6	(0)
2025	Alta	2	(0)
2026–	Inter Turku	0	(0)
- * Club domestic league appearances and goals as of 12 November 2026

Ville Markus Sakari Seppä (born 2 May 1996) is a Finnish professional football player who plays as a goalkeeper for Inter Turku.

== Club career ==
Seppä played in the youth sector of Inter Turku. After a ten-year spell playing in the lower divisions in Finland and Sweden, Seppä returned to his former club Inter in March 2024. He made his Veikkausliiga debut on 19 June 2024 at the age of 28, keeping a clean sheet in a 0–0 away draw against Haka.

On 13 July 2024, Seppä signed with fellow Veikkausliiga club Ilves for the rest of the 2024 season. Two weeks later on 25 July, Seppä debuted in European competitions, in a UEFA Conference League qualifying win against Austria Wien, replacing injured Otso Virtanen. He eventually made three appearances for Ilves in the qualifiers, before they were knocked out by Djurgården.

On 7 February 2024, Seppä signed with Bremer SV in Regionalliga Nord.

== Career statistics ==
As of 12 November 2026

Appearances and goals by club, season and competition
Club	Season	League			Cup (Note: Includes Suomen Cup)		League cup (Note: Includes Ykköscup, Finnish League Cup and Bremen Cup)		Europe		Total	
Club	Season	Division	Apps	Goals	Apps	Goals	Apps	Goals	Apps	Goals	Apps	Goals
Inter Turku	2014	Veikkausliiga	0	0	0	0	–		–		0	0
SalPa (loan)	2014	Kakkonen	15	0	–		–		–		15	0
Åbo IFK (loan)	2015	Kakkonen	12	0	–		–		–		12	0
SalPa	2016	Kakkonen	10	0	1	0	–		–		11	0
Salon Wilpas	2016	Kolmonen	1	0	–		–		–		1	0
Futura	2016	Kakkonen	5	0	–		–		–		5	0
TPS	2017	Ykkönen	0	0	0	0	–		–		0	0
Hercules	2018	Kakkonen	17	0	–		–		–		17	0
Jaro	2019	Ykkönen	15	0	4	0	–		–		19	0
JBK	2019	Kakkonen	2	0	–		–		–		2	0
Nyköpings BIS	2020	Ettan	14	0	1	0	–		–		15	0
TPS Akatemia	2021	Kolmonen	3	0	–		–		–		3	0
Assyriska IK	2021	Ettan	5	0	–		–		–		5	0
Team ThorenGruppen	2022	Ettan	4	0	–		–		–		4	0
KPV Akatemia	2022	Kolmonen	1	0	–		–		–		1	0
KPV	2022	Ykkönen	6	0	–		–		–		6	0
KPV	2023	Ykkönen	22	0	1	0	4	0	–		27	0
KPV	Total		28	0	1	0	4	0	0	0	33	0
Inter Turku	2024	Veikkausliiga	2	0	2	0	0	0	–		4	0
Ilves	2024	Veikkausliiga	4	0	–		–		3 (Note: Appearances in UEFA Conference League)	0	7	0
Bremer SV	2024–25	Regionalliga Nord	6	0	–		1	0	–		7	0
Alta	2025	2. divisjon	2	0	0	0	–		–		0	0
Inter Turku	2026	Veikkausliiga	0	0	0	0	1	0	–		0	0
Career total			147	0	9	0	6	0	3	0	165	0

== Honours ==
Ilves

- Veikkausliiga runner-up: 2024
