= Frank Owusu =

Ghanaian footballer (born 2004)

Personal information
- Date of birth: 19 December 2004 (age 21)
- Place of birth: Ghana
- Position: Centre-back

Team information
- Current team: Ekenäs IF

Youth career
- Rumark Football Academy
- Tamale City

Senior career*
Years	Team	Apps	(Gls)
2022–2024	Aduana Stars	54	(1)
2024–	Ekenäs IF	6	(0)
- * Club domestic league appearances and goals as of 21 October 2024

Frank Owusu (born 19 December 2004) is a Ghanaian professional football defender for Ykkösliiga club Ekenäs IF (EIF).

== Career statistics ==
As of 23 October 2024.

Appearances and goals by club, season and competition
Club	Season	League			Cup		Other		Total	
Club	Season	Division	Apps	Goals	Apps	Goals	Apps	Goals	Apps	Goals
Aduana Stars	2022–23	Ghana Premier League	23	1	–		–		23	1
Aduana Stars	2023–24	Ghana Premier League	31	0	–		–		31	0
Aduana Stars	Total		54	1	0	0	0	0	54	1
Ekenäs IF	2024	Veikkausliiga	6	0	–		–		6	0
Career total			60	1	0	0	0	0	60	1
