= Ekenäs Sport Club =

Finnish football club

- Full name: Ekenäs Sport Club
- Founded: 2007
- Ground: Ekenäs Centrumplan, Ekenäs; Raseborg; Finland
- Manager: Mike Keeney
- League: Kakkonen
Home colours	Away colours

Ekenäs Sport Club (abbreviated ESC) is a football club from Ekenäs, Raseborg in Finland. The club was formed in 2007 and their home ground is Ekenäs Centrumplan. The club is currently playing in the Kakkonen, the third tier of the Finnish league system.
