= FC Inter Turku =

Finnish football club

Inter Turku
- Full name: Football Club International Turku
- Nicknames: Sinimustat (Blue and Blacks) Hinaajat (Tugboats)
- Founded: 1990; 36 years ago
- Ground: Veritas Stadion; Kupittaa, Turku, Finland
- Capacity: 9,372
- Chairman: Stefan Håkans
- Manager: Vesa Vasara
- League: Veikkausliiga
- 2026: Veikkausliiga, 1st of 12 (Champions)
- Website: fcinter.fi
Home colours	Away colours

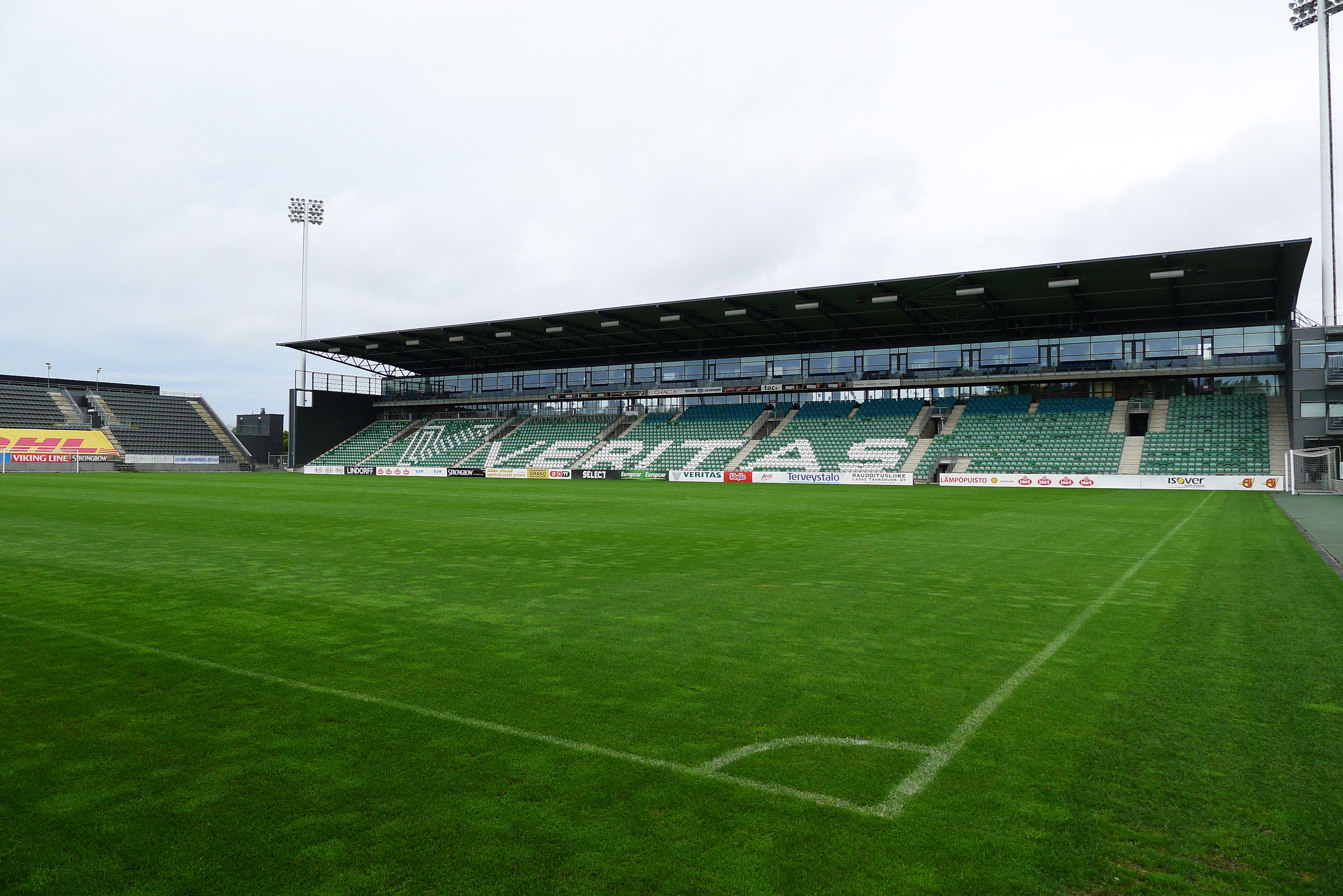
Veritas Stadion

Football Club International Turku, commonly referred to as Inter Turku (Swedish: Inter Åbo) and colloquially known as Inter, is a Finnish professional football club based in Turku that competes in the Veikkausliiga, the top flight of Finnish football. Founded in 1990 by Stefan Håkans, Inter has a rivalry with Turun Palloseura. The club has won two Finnish championship title, three Finnish Cup titles, and four Finnish League Cup titles. They play home matches at Veritas Stadion, with a capacity of 9,372.

== History ==
FC Inter was founded in 1990 by Stefan Håkans, the managing director of the towage and salvage company Alfons Håkans, allegedly after his 11-year-old son could not fit into any of the other youth teams in Turku. Both the name and the black and blue vertically striped jersey are inspired by Inter Milan, the club involved in a memorable near miss of future city rivals TPS, who beat Inter 1–0 at San Siro in the 1987–88 UEFA Cup but then lost the return leg 2–0 in Turku, exiting the competition after nearly achieving a historic breakthrough. The club's name was officially registered in September 1991. The club started out as a youth team, but in 1992 a senior squad was founded and it entered the Finnish league system at the fourth level (third division Kolmonen). The following year, the club assumed the place of the financially troubled local club Turun Toverit in the Second Division. Manager Timo Sinkkonen invested in new players, and eventually the club finished first and was promoted to the First Division (Ykkönen).

In 1995, Inter finished first in the Ykkönen and was promoted, as well as reaching the semi-final stage in the Finnish Cup. The squad was strengthened with new players, and in 1996, as both of Turku's better teams were now playing in the Veikkausliiga, the club's attendance records were broken with 8,200 spectators in the local derby between Turun Palloseura (TPS) and Inter.

In 1997, the club were relegated after finishing last in the Veikkausliiga, but achieved promotion again the following season. New foreign players were bought to strengthen the squad, such as Richard Teberio and Fernando Della Sala. Since then the club has consistently finished between 7th and 4th in the league, and maintained a steady inflow of foreign players as well as young starlets from its own youth academy.

During the 2006 season Inter sacked their manager Kari Virtanen and hired new coach, Dutchman Rene van Eck. After the season van Eck returned to Switzerland to coach FC Wohlen, and another Dutchman Job Dragtsma took over.

In 2008 Inter led the league since early season and clinched their first Finnish championship title after winning against FF Jaro in their final game.

In the 2011 Veikkausliiga season, the club's first-choice striker Timo Furuholm scored 22 goals and won the Veikkausliiga Golden Boot, and helped Inter to finish as the season's runner-up.

In August 2026, Inter sold the centre-back Ilari Kangasniemi to English club Leicester City for the league's record-high transfer fee of €2.5 million.

On November 8th 2026, Inter Turku won their 2nd Veikkausliiga title after winning 2-0 against the 2025 Veikkausliiga winners KuPS.

== European cup history ==
Season	Competition	Round	Club	Home	Away	Aggregate	Y/N
2005	UEFA Intertoto Cup	1R	(Iceland) ÍA	0–0	4–0	4–0	
2005	UEFA Intertoto Cup	2R	(Croatia) NK Varteks	2–2	3–4	5–6	
2009–10	UEFA Champions League	2Q	(Moldova) Sheriff	0–1	0–1	0–2	
2010–11	UEFA Europa League	3Q	(Belgium) Genk	1–5	2–3	3–8	
2012–13	UEFA Europa League	2Q	(Netherlands) Twente	0–5	1–1	1–6	
2013–14	UEFA Europa League	1Q	(Faroe Islands) Víkingur Gøta	0–1	1–1	1–2	
2019–20	UEFA Europa League	1Q	(Denmark) Brøndby	2–0	1–4	3–4	
2020–21	UEFA Europa League	1Q	(Hungary) Honvéd	—N/a	1−2 (a.e.t.)	—N/a	
2021–22	UEFA Europa Conference League	1Q	(Hungary) Puskás Akadémia	1–1	0–2	1–3	
2022–23	UEFA Europa Conference League	1Q	(Kosovo) Drita	1–0	0–3	1–3	
2026–27	UEFA Conference League	1Q	(Bosnia and Herzegovina) Sarajevo	2–1	1–1	3–2	
2026–27	UEFA Conference League	2Q	(Turkey) İstanbul Başakşehir	2–0	1–1	3–1	
2026–27	UEFA Conference League	3Q	(Liechtenstein) Vaduz	2–1	2–2	4–3	
2026–27	UEFA Conference League	PO	(Denmark) Copenhagen	0–0	1–4	1–4	
2027–28	UEFA Champions League	1Q					

== Season to season ==
Season to Season

Season	Level	Division	Section	Administration	Position	Movements
1992	Tier 4	III divisioona (Third Division)	Group 3	Turku District (SPL Turku)	6th	
1993	Tier 3	II divisioona (Second Division)	West Group	Finnish FA (Suomen Palloliitto)	2nd	Promoted
1994	Tier 2	Ykkönen (First Division)		Finnish FA (Suomen Palloliitto)	3rd	
1995	Tier 2	Ykkönen (First Division)		Finnish FA (Suomen Palloliitto)	1st	Promoted
1996	Tier 1	Veikkausliiga (Premier League)		Finnish FA (Suomen Palloliitto)	5th	Upper Group – 6th
1997	Tier 1	Veikkausliiga (Premier League)		Finnish FA (Suomen Palloliitto)	7th	Third round – 10th – Relegated
1998	Tier 2	Ykkönen (First Division)	South Group	Finnish FA (Suomen Palloliitto)	2nd	Upper Group – 3rd – Promoted
1999	Tier 1	Veikkausliiga (Premier League)		Finnish FA (Suomen Palloliitto)	3rd	Upper Group – 5th
2000	Tier 1	Veikkausliiga (Premier League)		Finnish FA (Suomen Palloliitto)	7th	
2001	Tier 1	Veikkausliiga (Premier League)		Finnish FA (Suomen Palloliitto)	5th	
2002	Tier 1	Veikkausliiga (Premier League)		Finnish FA (Suomen Palloliitto)	5th	
2003	Tier 1	Veikkausliiga (Premier League)		Finnish FA (Suomen Palloliitto)	7th	
2004	Tier 1	Veikkausliiga (Premier League)		Finnish FA (Suomen Palloliitto)	4th	
2005	Tier 1	Veikkausliiga (Premier League)		Finnish FA (Suomen Palloliitto)	5th	
2006	Tier 1	Veikkausliiga (Premier League)		Finnish FA (Suomen Palloliitto)	10th	
2007	Tier 1	Veikkausliiga (Premier League)		Finnish FA (Suomen Palloliitto)	9th	
2008	Tier 1	Veikkausliiga (Premier League)		Finnish FA (Suomen Palloliitto)	1st	Champions
2009	Tier 1	Veikkausliiga (Premier League)		Finnish FA (Suomen Palloliitto)	5th	
2010	Tier 1	Veikkausliiga (Premier League)		Finnish FA (Suomen Palloliitto)	6th	
2011	Tier 1	Veikkausliiga (Premier League)		Finnish FA (Suomen Palloliitto)	2nd	
2012	Tier 1	Veikkausliiga (Premier League)		Finnish FA (Suomen Palloliitto)	2nd	
2013	Tier 1	Veikkausliiga (Premier League)		Finnish FA (Suomen Palloliitto)	9th	
2014	Tier 1	Veikkausliiga (Premier League)		Finnish FA (Suomen Palloliitto)	10th	
2015	Tier 1	Veikkausliiga (Premier League)		Finnish FA (Suomen Palloliitto)	4th	
2016	Tier 1	Veikkausliiga (Premier League)		Finnish FA (Suomen Palloliitto)	11th	
2017	Tier 1	Veikkausliiga (Premier League)		Finnish FA (Suomen Palloliitto)	9th	
2018	Tier 1	Veikkausliiga (Premier League)		Finnish FA (Suomen Palloliitto)	7th	
2019	Tier 1	Veikkausliiga (Premier League)		Finnish FA (Suomen Palloliitto)	2nd	
2020	Tier 1	Veikkausliiga (Premier League)		Finnish FA (Suomen Palloliitto)	2nd	
2021	Tier 1	Veikkausliiga (Premier League)		Finnish FA (Suomen Palloliitto)	3rd	
2022	Tier 1	Veikkausliiga (Premier League)		Finnish FA (Suomen Palloliitto)	5th	
2023	Tier 1	Veikkausliiga (Premier League)		Finnish FA (Suomen Palloliitto)	6th	
2024	Tier 1	Veikkausliiga (Premier League)		Finnish FA (Suomen Palloliitto)	7th	
2025	Tier 1	Veikkausliiga (Premier League)		Finnish FA (Suomen Palloliitto)	2nd	

- 29 seasons in Veikkausliiga
- 3 seasons in Ykkönen
- 1 seasons in Kakkonen
- 1 seasons in Kolmonen

== Record transfers ==
Rank	Player	To	Fee	Year
1.	(Finland) Ilari Kangasniemi	(England) Leicester City	€2.5 million	2026
2.	(Ivory Coast) Axel Kouame	(Sweden) AIK	€1.0 million	2025
3.	(Cameroon) Antoin Essomba	(Saudi Arabia) Al-Kholood	€1.0 million	2026
4.	(Finland) Djoully Nzoko	(Belgium) Jong Genk	€800,000	2024
5.	(Finland) Timo Stavitski	(Sweden) Mjällby	undisclosed	2024

== Current squad ==
As of 6 September 2026

Note: Flags indicate national team as defined under FIFA eligibility rules; some limited exceptions apply. Players may hold more than one non-FIFA nationality.

No.	Pos.	Nation	Player
1	GK	FIN	Eetu Huuhtanen
2	DF	FIN	Jussi Niska
3	DF	FIN	Juuso Hämäläinen
4	MF	GHA	Prosper Ahiabu
5	DF	FIN	Albin Granlund
6	DF	FIN	Robert Ivanov
7	FW	SWE	Herman Sjögrell
8	MF	FIN	Johannes Yli-Kokko
9	FW	FIN	Jasse Tuominen
10	FW	SLE	Alie Conteh (on loan from Strømsgodset)
11	FW	BFA	Jean Botué
12	GK	FIN	Eero Vuorjoki
13	GK	FIN	Alex Hilden
14	MF	FIN	Janne-Pekka Laine
16	FW	NGR	Clinton Jephta

No.	Pos.	Nation	Player
17	MF	GHA	Bismark Ampofo
18	DF	FIN	Seth Saarinen
19	MF	FIN	Iiro Järvinen
20	DF	FIN	Axel Sandler
22	DF	FIN	Luka Kuittinen
24	DF	FIN	Julius Tauriainen
26	FW	FIN	Vilho Huovila
27	MF	FIN	Vincent Ulundu
28	MF	FIN	Lauri Laine (on loan from Baník Ostrava)
30	DF	GHA	Yeboah Amankwah
33	FW	GAM	Muhammed Suso (on loan from Pardubice)
34	FW	SVK	Lukáš Prokop (on loan from Žilina)
35	MF	FIN	Eeli Kiiskilä
36	GK	FIN	Ville Seppä

=== Out on loan ===
Note: Flags indicate national team as defined under FIFA eligibility rules; some limited exceptions apply. Players may hold more than one non-FIFA nationality.

No.	Pos.	Nation	Player

== Management ==
As of 29.04.2026

Name	Role
(Finland) Vesa Vasara	Manager
(Finland) Riku Paularinne	Assistant coach
(Finland) Jussi-Pekka Savolainen	Reserve team head coach
(Finland) Miika Salmi	Goalkeeping coach
(Finland) Niko Lehikoinen	First Team Administrator
(Finland) Ville Peltonen	Physiotherapist
(Finland) Teemu Ahonen	Physiotherapist
(Finland) Aleksi Moilanen	Physiotherapist
(Finland) Seppo Pajunen	Kit Manager
(Finland) Tero Silto	Team doctor
(Finland) Jani Meriläinen	InterAction director
(Finland) Kalle Parviainen	Sporting director

Name	Role
(Finland) Jyrki Ahola	Scout
(Finland) Viki Savonen	Head of scout

== Honours ==
- Veikkausliiga
  - Winners (2): 2008, 2026
  - Runners-up (3): 2019, 2020, 2025
- Finnish Cup
  - Winners (3): 2009, 2017–18, 2026
  - Runners-up (5): 2014, 2015, 2020, 2022, 2024
- Finnish League Cup
  - Winners (4): 2008, 2024, 2025, 2026
  - Runners-up (2): 2007, 2022

=== Player records ===
- Most goals scored: Timo Furuholm (85 goals)
- Most matches played: Ari Nyman (406 matches)

== Past managers ==
- (Finland) Anders Romberg (1992)
- (Finland) Timo Sinkkonen (1993 – 1994)
- (Finland) Hannu Paatelo (1995 – 1997)
- (Finland) Tomi Jalo (1997 – 1998)
- (England) Steven Polack (1998)
- (Finland) Timo Askolin (1999 – 2000)
- (Finland) Pertti Lundell (January 1, 2001 – December 31, 2002)
- (Finland) Kari Virtanen (January 1, 2003 – September 16, 2006)
- (Netherlands) René van Eck (September 16, 2006 – November 16, 2006)
- (Netherlands) Job Dragtsma (January 1, 2007 – May 26, 2016)
- (Finland) Jami Wallenius (May 26, 2016 – August 3, 2016)
- (Finland) Shefki Kuqi (August 3, 2016 – August 3, 2017)
- (Italy) Fabrizio Piccareta (August 3, 2017 – June 10, 2018)
- (Spain) José Riveiro (January 1, 2019 – December 31, 2021)
- (Spain) Miguel Grau (January 1, 2022 – September 19, 2022)
- (Spain) Ramiro Muñoz (September 20, 2022 – December 31, 2022)
- (Finland) Jarkko Wiss (January 1, 2023 – November 6, 2023)
- (Finland) Vesa Vasara (January 1, 2024 – present)
