= 2023 HJK season =

115th season in existence of HJK Helsinki

HJK
2023 season
- Chairman: Olli-Pekka Lyytikäinen
- Manager: Toni Koskela, Toni Korkeakunnas
- Stadium: Bolt Arena
- Veikkausliiga: Champions
- Finnish Cup: Fifth round vs Honka
- Finnish League Cup: Champions
- UEFA Champions League: Second qualifying round vs Molde
- UEFA Europa League: Third qualifying round Qarabağ
- UEFA Europa Conference League: Group stage
- Top goalscorer: League: Bojan Radulović (18); All: Bojan Radulović (25)
- Highest home attendance: 10,121 vs Larne (12 July 2023); 10,121 vs KuPS (3 September 2023); 10,121 vs KuPS (21 October 2023)
- Lowest home attendance: 217 vs Lahti (8 February 2023)
- Average home league attendance: 5,631 (21 October 2023)
| Home colours | Away colours | Third colours |

The 2023 season was Helsingin Jalkapalloklubi's 115th competitive season. HJK entered the Veikkausliiga season as three time defending champions. In Europe, HJK qualified for the UEFA Europa Conference League group stage. After four years at the helm, Manager Toni Koskela was replaced by Toni Korkeakunnas mid-season.

== Season events ==
On 27 December 2022, Anthony Olusanya extended his contract with HJK until the end of the 2025 season.

On 4 January, David Ezeh signed a new contract with HJK until the end of the 2025 season.

On 10 January, Francis Etu signed a three-year contract with HJK.

On 12 January, HJK extended the loan-deal with Helsingborg for Lucas Lingman until the end of the season.

On 14 January, HJK announced the singing of Georgios Kanellopoulos to a two-year contract, with an option of a third year, from Asteras Tripolis.

On 8 February, free-agent Dejan Iliev signed for HJK on a one-year contract, with the option of a second year.

On 10 February, HJK extended their contract with Samuel Anini Junior until the end of the 2024 season, and loaned him out to IFK Mariehamn for the season alongside Elmo Henriksson and Patrik Raitanen.

On 15 February, Santeri Hostikka signed a new contract with HJK until the end of the 2024 season.

On 16 February, HJK announced the singing of Nils Svensson from Vänersborgs IF, to a two-year contract with the option of a third year.

On 6 March, Altti Hellemaa extended his contract with HJK until the end of 2025, and then joined SJK on loan for the season.

On 4 April, HJK extended their contract with Kai Meriluoto until the end of the 2025 season.

On 24 July, HJK announced the signings of Filip Rogić and Niko Hämäläinen.

On 26 July, HJK announced the loan signing of Kristopher Da Graca from IK Sirius with the rights to make the move permanent at the end of the season.

On 3 August, HJK extended their contract with Aaro Toivonen until the end of the 2025 season. The following day, 4 August, HJK announced the signing of Niki Mäenpää on a contract until the end of the season as cover for the injured Dejan Iliev.

On 11 August, HJK announced the signing of Hassane Bandé from Amiens until the end of June 2025.

On 5 November, HJK exercised a clause in their contract with Jesse Öst to extend his contract with the club until the end of the 2024 season. The following day, 6 November, Kevin Kouassivi-Benissan extended his contract with the club until the end of the 2025 season.

On 28 November, Atomu Tanaka extended his contract with the club for another season, until the end of 2024.

== Squad ==
As of match played 14 December 2023

| No. | Name | Nationality | Position | Date of birth (age) | Signed from | Signed in | Contract ends |
Goalkeepers
| 1 | Jesse Öst | (Finland) | GK | 20 October 1990 (aged 33) | SJK | 2023 | 2024 |
| 25 | Dejan Iliev | (North Macedonia) | GK | 25 February 1995 (aged 28) | Unattached | 2023 | 2023(+1) |
| 78 | Alex Ramula | (Finland) | GK | 17 January 2005 (aged 18) | Klubi 04 | 2023 | |
| 85 | Niki Mäenpää | (Finland) | GK | 23 January 1985 (aged 38) | Unattached | 2023 | 2023 |
Defenders
| 2 | Tuomas Ollila | (Finland) | DF | 25 April 2000 (aged 23) | Ilves | 2023 | |
| 3 | Niko Hämäläinen | (Finland) | DF | 5 March 1997 (aged 26) | Unattached | 2023 | |
| 4 | Joona Toivio | (Finland) | DF | 10 March 1988 (aged 35) | BK Häcken | 2022 | 2024 |
| 5 | Kristopher Da Graca | (Cape Verde) | DF | 16 January 1998 (aged 25) | on loan from IK Sirius | 2023 | 2023 |
| 6 | Aapo Halme | (Finland) | DF | 22 May 1998 (aged 25) | Barnsley | 2022 | 2024 |
| 15 | Miro Tenho | (Finland) | DF | 2 April 1995 (aged 28) | Inter Turku | 2020 | 2023 |
| 16 | Valtteri Moren | (Finland) | DF | 15 June 1991 (aged 32) | Waasland-Beveren | 2020 | 2022 |
| 22 | Jukka Raitala | (Finland) | DF | 15 September 1988 (aged 35) | Minnesota United | 2022 | 2023 |
Midfields
| 8 | Filip Rogić | (Sweden) | MF | 14 June 1993 (aged 30) | Unattached | 2023 | |
| 10 | Lucas Lingman | (Finland) | MF | 25 January 1998 (aged 25) | on loan from Helsingborg | 2022 | 2023 |
| 14 | Matti Peltola | (Finland) | MF | 3 July 2002 (aged 21) | Klubi 04 | 2019 | |
| 19 | Aleksi Paananen | (Finland) | MF | 25 January 1993 (aged 30) | Inter Turku | 2023 | |
| 23 | Pyry Soiri | (Finland) | MF | 22 September 1994 (aged 29) | Esbjerg fB | 2022 | 2023 |
| 24 | Georgios Kanellopoulos | (Greece) | MF | 29 January 2000 (aged 23) | Asteras Tripolis | 2023 | 2024(+1) |
| 27 | Kevin Kouassivi-Benissan | (Finland) | MF | 25 January 1999 (aged 24) | Klubi 04 | 2018 | 2025 |
| 37 | Atomu Tanaka | (Japan) | MF | 4 October 1987 (aged 36) | Cerezo Osaka | 2020 | 2024 |
| 46 | Oliver Pettersson | (Finland) | MF | 13 May 2003 (aged 20) | Ekenäs IF | 2022 | |
| 52 | Aaro Toivonen | (Finland) | MF | 19 April 2005 (aged 18) | Klubi 04 | 2022 | 2025 |
| 56 | Përparim Hetemaj | (Finland) | MF | 12 December 1986 (aged 37) | Reggina | 2022 | 2023 |
| 59 | Liam Möller | (Finland) | MF | 21 December 2004 (aged 18) | Klubi 04 | 2023 | |
Forwards
| 7 | Santeri Hostikka | (Finland) | FW | 30 September 1997 (aged 26) | Pogoń Szczecin | 2021 | 2024 |
| 9 | Bojan Radulović | (Serbia) | FW | 29 December 1999 (aged 23) | AIK | 2022 | 2023 |
| 11 | Roope Riski | (Finland) | FW | 16 August 1991 (aged 32) | SKN St. Pölten | 2020 | |
| 17 | Hassane Bandé | (Burkina Faso) | FW | 30 October 1998 (aged 25) | Amiens | 2023 | 2025 |
| 18 | Topi Keskinen | (Finland) | FW | 7 March 2003 (aged 20) | Mikkelin Palloilijat | 2023 | |
| 29 | Anthony Olusanya | (Finland) | FW | 1 February 2000 (aged 23) | FF Jaro | 2021 | 2025 |
| 34 | Maksim Stjopin | (Finland) | FW | 8 April 2003 (aged 20) | on loan from Nordsjælland | 2023 | |
| 73 | David Ezeh | (Finland) | FW | 13 February 2006 (aged 17) | Klubi 04 | 2023 | 2025 |
Klubi 04
| 43 | Santeri Silander | (Finland) | DF | 20 April 2004 (aged 19) | Klubi 04 | 2023 | |
| 48 | Francis Etu | (Nigeria) | FW | 10 April 2004 (aged 19) | Klubi 04 | 2023 | 2025 |
| 56 | William Grönblom | (Finland) | DF | 13 January 2005 (aged 18) | Klubi 04 | 2023 | |
| 61 | Ville Vuorinen | (Finland) | DF | 21 February 2005 (aged 18) | Klubi 04 | 2023 | |
| 62 | Nils Svensson | (Sweden) | DF | 9 May 2002 (aged 21) | Vänersborgs IF | 2023 | 2024(+1) |
| 64 | Matias Ritari | (Finland) | MF | 15 July 2005 (aged 18) | Klubi 04 | 2023 | |
| 65 | Otto Hannula | (Finland) | FW | 29 September 2005 (aged 18) | Klubi 04 | 2023 | |
| 67 | Dylan Hayes | (Finland) | FW | 14 April 2004 (aged 19) | Klubi 04 | 2023 | |
| 68 | Jasper Pikkuhookana | (Finland) | MF | 6 July 2003 (aged 20) | Klubi 04 | 2023 | |
| 71 | Stanislav Baranov | (Finland) | FW | 15 April 2005 (aged 18) | Klubi 04 | 2023 | |
| 74 | Benjamin Dahlström | (Finland) | MF | 8 August 2003 (aged 20) | Klubi 04 | 2023 | |
| 75 | Johan Lietsa | (Finland) | DF | 15 February 2005 (aged 18) | Klubi 04 | 2023 | |
| 76 | Kingsley Kwasi Kwaw | (Finland) | FW | 16 March 2006 (aged 17) | Klubi 04 | 2023 | |
| 97 | Michael Boamah | (Finland) | DF | 16 April 2003 (aged 20) | Klubi 04 | 2023 | |
Away on loan
| 17 | Johannes Yli-Kokko | (Finland) | MF | 24 August 2001 (aged 22) | Klubi 04 | 2022 | |
| 28 | Miska Ylitolva | (Finland) | DF | 23 May 2004 (aged 19) | RoPS | 2022 | 2023 |
| 41 | Samuel Anini Junior | (Finland) | FW | 7 September 2002 (aged 21) | PK Keski-Uusimaa | 2019 | 2024 |
| 42 | Kai Meriluoto | (Finland) | FW | 2 January 2003 (aged 20) | Klubi 04 | 2020 | 2025 |
| 45 | Elmo Henriksson | (Finland) | GK | 10 March 2003 (aged 20) | Klubi 04 | 2021 | |
| 57 | Niilo Kujasalo | (Finland) | MF | 17 March 2004 (aged 19) | Klubi 04 | 2023 | |
| | Halil Bağci | (Turkey) | GK | 4 April 2003 (aged 20) | MKE Ankaragücü | 2023 | |
| | Patrik Raitanen | (Finland) | DF | 13 June 2001 (aged 22) | Unattached | 2021 | |

== Transfers and contracts ==
=== Released ===
| Date | Position | Nationality | Name | Joined | Date | Ref. |
|---|---|---|---|---|---|---|
| 1 February 2023 | DF | (Brazil) | Murilo | SJK | 22 February 2023 | |
| 31 December 2023 | DF | (Finland) | Jukka Raitala | IF Gnistan | 1 January 2024 | |
| 31 December 2023 | MF | (Finland) | Përparim Hetemaj | Retired | | |
| 31 December 2023 | MF | (Finland) | Aleksi Paananen | AC Oulu | 1 January 2024 | |
| 31 December 2023 | MF | (Finland) | Matti Peltola | D.C. United | 2 February 2024 | |
| 31 December 2023 | FW | (Finland) | Roope Riski | Ilves | 1 January 2024 | |

=== Transfers in ===
| Date | Position | Nationality | Name | From | Fee | Ref. |
|---|---|---|---|---|---|---|
| 14 January 2023 | MF | (Greece) | Georgios Kanellopoulos | Asteras Tripolis | Undisclosed | |
| 8 February 2023 | GK | (North Macedonia) | Dejan Iliev | Unattached | Free | |
| 24 July 2023 | DF | (Finland) | Niko Hämäläinen | Unattached | Free | |
| 24 July 2023 | MF | (Sweden) | Filip Rogić | Unattached | Free | |
| 4 August 2023 | GK | (Finland) | Niki Mäenpää | Unattached | Free | |
| 11 August 2023 | FW | (Burkina Faso) | Hassane Bandé | Amiens | Undisclosed | |

=== Transfers out ===
| Date | Position | Nationality | Name | To | Fee | Ref. |
|---|---|---|---|---|---|---|
| 19 January 2023 | DF | (Finland) | Anton Aaltonen | Inter Turku | Undisclosed | |
| 23 January 2023 | DF | (Finland) | Arttu Hoskonen | MKS Cracovia | €250,000 | |
| 20 December 2023 | DF | (Finland) | Miro Tenho | Djurgården | Free | |
| 28 December 2023 | MF | (Finland) | Pyry Soiri | U Craiova | Free | |

=== Loans in ===
| Start date | Position | Nationality | Name | From | End date | Ref. |
|---|---|---|---|---|---|---|
| 12 January 2023 | MF | (Finland) | Lucas Lingman | Helsingborg | End of season | |
| 26 July 2023 | DF | (Cape Verde) | Kristopher Da Graca | IK Sirius | End of season | |

=== Loans out ===
| Start date | Position | Nationality | Name | To | End date | Ref. |
|---|---|---|---|---|---|---|
| 10 February 2023 | GK | (Finland) | Elmo Henriksson | IFK Mariehamn | End of season | |
| 10 February 2023 | DF | (Finland) | Patrik Raitanen | IFK Mariehamn | End of season | |
| 10 February 2023 | FW | (Finland) | Samuel Anini Junior | IFK Mariehamn | End of season | |
| 20 February 2023 | MF | (Finland) | Johannes Yli-Kokko | Dundalk | 31 July 2023 | |
| 6 March 2023 | MF | (Finland) | Altti Hellemaa | SJK | End of season | |
| 20 April 2023 | MF | (Finland) | Niilo Kujasalo | KPV | End of season | |
| 14 July 2023 | MF | (Finland) | Kai Meriluoto | Stal Mielec | 30 June 2024 | |
| 17 July 2023 | DF | (Finland) | Miska Ylitolva | KTP | End of season | |

== Friendlies ==
| 21 January 2023 | HJK | 4–0 | Haka | Helsinki |
| 14:00 EET (UTC+2) | | Report | | Stadium: Bolt Arena |

| 11 February 2023 | Tromsø (Norway) | 2–3 | (Finland) HJK | Oliva |
| 14:00 CET (UTC+1) | | Report | | Stadium: Oliva Nova Golf & Beach Resort Campo 1 |

| 8 March 2023 | HJK | 2–3 | SJK | Helsinki |
| 17:00 EET (UTC+2) | | Report | | Stadium: Bolt Arena |

| 11 March 2023 | HJK | 3–1 | Ilves | Helsinki |
| 16:00 EET (UTC+2) | | Report | | Stadium: Bolt Arena |

== Competitions ==
=== Overall record ===
| Competition | First match | Last match | Starting round | Final position | Record | | | | | | | |
| Competition | First match | Last match | Starting round | Final position | Pld | W | D | L | GF | GA | GD | Win % |
|---|---|---|---|---|---|---|---|---|---|---|---|---|
| Veikkausliiga | 2 April 2023 | 21 October 2023 | Matchday 1 | Winners | 27 | 15 | 8 | 4 | 50 | 26 | +24 | 55.56 |
| Finnish Cup | 30 May 2023 | 30 May 2023 | Fifth round | Fifth round | 1 | 0 | 1 | 0 | 1 | 1 | +0 | 0.00 |
| League Cup | 27 January 2022 | 1 April 2023 | Group stage | Winners | 7 | 5 | 1 | 1 | 17 | 9 | +8 | 71.43 |
| UEFA Champions League | 12 July 2022 | 2 August 2023 | First qualifying round | Second qualifying round | 4 | 2 | 1 | 1 | 4 | 4 | +0 | 50.00 |
| UEFA Europa League | 10 August 2022 | 17 August 2022 | Third qualifying round | Third qualifying round | 2 | 0 | 0 | 2 | 2 | 4 | −2 | 0.00 |
| UEFA Europa Conference League | 24 August 2022 | 14 December 2023 | Playoff round | Group stage | 8 | 1 | 2 | 5 | 10 | 19 | −9 | 12.50 |
| Total | | | | | 49 | 23 | 13 | 13 | 84 | 63 | +21 | 46.94 |

Last updated: 14 December 2023
Source: Competitions

=== Veikkausliiga ===
==== Regular season ====
===== Results summary =====
| Overall | | | | | | | | Home | | | | | | Away | | | | | |
| Pld | W | D | L | GF | GA | GD | Pts | W | D | L | GF | GA | GD | W | D | L | GF | GA | GD |
|---|---|---|---|---|---|---|---|---|---|---|---|---|---|---|---|---|---|---|---|
| 22 | 12 | 8 | 2 | 39 | 19 | +20 | 44 | 7 | 3 | 1 | 21 | 7 | +14 | 5 | 5 | 1 | 18 | 12 | +6 |

Last updated: 3 September 2023.
Source: See Matches

===== Results =====
| 5 April 2023 1 | HJK | 2 – 0 | Honka | Helsinki |
| 18:15 EEST (UTC+3) | Tanaka 38'; Radulović 54' (yellow card) 86'; Hetemaj (yellow card) 80' | Report | Aalto (yellow card) 61' | Stadium: Bolt Arena; Attendance: 6,125; Referee: Mohammed Al-Emara |

| 15 April 2023 2 | VPS | 0 – 1 | HJK | Vaasa |
| 18:30 EEST (UTC+3) | | Report | Hostikka (yellow card) 37'; Radulović (penalty missed) 60'; Bashkirov 82' (o.g.) | Stadium: Hietalahti Stadium; Attendance: 2,612; Referee: Ville Nevalainen |

| 19 April 2023 19 | HJK | 4 – 0 | VPS | Helsinki |
| 18:00 EEST (UTC+3) | Radulović 20', 73'; Peltola (yellow card) 29'; Ollila 32' (yellow card) 68'; Meriluoto (yellow card) 78' (goal) 81' | Report | | Stadium: Bolt Arena; Attendance: 3,111; Referee: Oskari Hämäläinen |

| 23 April 2023 3 | HJK | 1 – 1 | AC Oulu | Helsinki |
| 18:30 EEST (UTC+3) | Ollila (yellow card) 5'; Tanaka (yellow card) 44'; Radulović 52' (pen.); Raitala (yellow card) 61'; Toivio (red card) 80' | Report | Kallinen (yellow card) 30'; Selander (yellow card) 50'; Valencia (yellow card) 53'; Baliso (yellow card) 54'; Coffey 78' (pen.); Huhtala (yellow card) 90' | Stadium: Bolt Arena; Attendance: 3,521; Referee: Petri Viljanen |

| 29 April 2023 4 | HJK | 2 – 0 | Haka | Helsinki |
| 15:00 EEST (UTC+3) | Radulović 38'; Meriluoto 42'; Kanellopoulos (yellow card) 51' | Report | Laine (yellow card) 52' | Stadium: Bolt Arena; Attendance: 4,306; Referee: Joni Hyytiä |

| 5 May 2023 5 | KuPS | 2 – 1 | HJK | Kuopio |
| 18:15 EEST (UTC+3) | Bispo (yellow card) 13'; Veteli 18'; Sichenje (yellow card) 61'; Savolainen 80'; Popovitch (yellow card) 82'; Jensen (yellow card) 90+1' | Report | Keskinen 45'; Peltola (yellow card) 90+4' | Stadium: Kuopio Football Stadium; Attendance: 5,423; Referee: Peiman Simani |

| 9 May 2023 15 | KTP | 3 – 3 | HJK | Kotka |
| 18:00 EEST (UTC+3) | Roiha 58'; Mika 78' (yellow card) 82'; Furtado 90+2'; Mäkelä (yellow card) 90+4' | Report | Stjopin 3'; Peltola 23'; Tanaka (yellow card) 60'; Möller 84' | Stadium: Arto Tolsa Areena; Attendance: 3,065; Referee: Joni Hyytiä |

| 13 May 2023 6 | HJK | 4 – 1 | Inter Turku | Helsinki |
| 17:00 EEST (UTC+3) | Paananen 54'; Tenho 63'; Ollila 83', 90' | Report | Nurmi 6'; Legbo (yellow card) 45+5'; Järvinen (yellow card) 90+4' | Stadium: Bolt Arena; Attendance: 4,723; Referee: Antti Munukka |

| 21 May 2023 7 | Ilves | 1 – 1 | HJK | Tampere |
| 16:00 EEST (UTC+3) | James 48' (yellow card) 90+2'; Ala-Myllymäki (penalty missed) 53' (yellow card) 64'; Larsson (yellow card) 68'; Katz (yellow card) 88'; Aspegren (yellow card) 88' | Report | Olusanya (yellow card) 39'; Toivio (yellow card) 85'; Radulović 90+4'; Keskinen (yellow card) 90+5' | Stadium: Tampere Stadium; Attendance: 6,588; Referee: Petri Viljanen |

| 27 May 2023 8 | IFK Mariehamn | 0 – 0 | HJK | Mariehamn |
| 18:30 EEST (UTC+3) | Asiri (yellow card) 90+1' | Report | Hetemaj (yellow card) 80'; Paananen (yellow card) 82' | Stadium: Wiklöf Holding Arena; Attendance: 1,208; Referee: Joni Hyytiä |

| 3 June 2023 9 | HJK | 0 – 0 | SJK | Helsinki |
| 17:00 EEST (UTC+3) | Ollila (yellow card) 90+1'; Kanellopoulos (yellow card) 90+4' | Report | Moreno (yellow card) 76' | Stadium: Bolt Arena; Attendance: 5,639; Referee: Oliver Reitala |

| 7 June 2023 10 | Lahti | 1 – 2 | HJK | Lahti |
| 18:00 EEST (UTC+3) | Tauriainen 3' | Report | Olusanya (yellow card) 40'; Radulović 48', 74' (pen.) | Stadium: Lahden Stadion; Attendance: 2,890; Referee: Mohammed Al-Emara |

| 11 June 2023 11 | HJK | 1 – 0 | KTP | Helsinki |
| 18:30 EEST (UTC+3) | Radulović 64' (pen.); Soiri (yellow card) 86' | Report | | Stadium: Bolt Arena; Attendance: 5,012; Referee: Peiman Simani |

| 27 June 2023 12 | Haka | 1 – 1 | HJK | Valkeakoski |
| 18:00 EEST (UTC+3) | Fofana (yellow card) 39'; Mahuta 57' | Report | Hostikka 9'; Toivio (red card) 45+2'; Paananen (yellow card) 77'; Iliev (yellow card) 89' | Stadium: Tehtaan kenttä Attendance: 2,905; Referee: Peiman Simani |

| 1 July 2023 13 | Honka | 1 – 1 | HJK | Espoo |
| 14:00 EEST (UTC+3) | Koskinen (yellow card) 18' (goal) 55'; Ortiz (yellow card) 60' | Report | Radulović 90+1' (pen.) | Stadium: Tapiolan urheilupuisto Attendance: 3,443; Referee: Peiman Simani |

| 8 July 2023 14 | HJK | 0 – 1 | Lahti | Helsinki |
| 14:00 EEST (UTC+3) | Peltola (yellow card) 42'; Tenho (yellow card) 43'; Soiri (yellow card) 50' | Report | Zeqiri 33', (yellow card) 67'; Ljubić (yellow card) 81'; Koskipalo (yellow card) 88' | Stadium: Bolt Arena; Attendance: 4,056; Referee: Oliver Reitala |

| 22 July 2023 16 | HJK | 1 – 0 | Ilves | Helsinki |
| 17:00 EEST (UTC+3) | Tenho 53' (yellow card) 71' | Report | Umar (yellow card) 34'; Haarala (yellow card) 37'; Katz (yellow card) 54'; Traoré (yellow card) 90' | Stadium: Bolt Arena; Attendance: 5,059; Referee: Joona Manninen |

| 29 July 2023 17 | SJK | 1 – 2 | HJK | Seinäjoki |
| 17:00 EEST (UTC+3) | Murilo (yellow card) 34'; Dunwoody 45+2'; Gasc (yellow card) 76' | Report | Kanellopoulos (yellow card) 30'; Radulović 55'; Olusanya 60'; Hetemaj (red card) 76'; Keskinen (yellow card) 90+3' | Stadium: OmaSP Stadion; Attendance: 5,016; Referee: Peiman Simani |

| 5 August 2023 18 | HJK | 4 – 2 | IFK Mariehamn | Helsinki |
| 15:00 EEST (UTC+3) | Olusanya 9'; Hostikka 19', 77'; Rogić (yellow card) 23'; Halme (yellow card) 34'; Soiri 90' (pen.) | Report | Ngueukam 35' van der Heyden 85'; Coubronne (yellow card) 90+1' | Stadium: Bolt Arena; Attendance: 8,005; Referee: Oskari Hämäläinen |

| 20 August 2023 20 | Inter Turku | 1 – 3 | HJK | Turku |
| 14:00 EEST (UTC+3) | Smith 15'; Forsell (yellow card) 56' | Report | Radulović 62', 64', 68' | Stadium: Veritas Stadion; Attendance: 5,021; Referee: Peiman Simani |

| 27 August 2023 21 | AC Oulu | 1 – 3 | HJK | Oulu |
| 18:00 EEST (UTC+3) | Valencia (yellow card) 43'; Coffey (yellow card) 80' (goal) 82'; Morais (yellow card) 85' | Report | Tenho 27'; Ollila 68', 78'; Tanaka (yellow card) 74' | Stadium: Raatti Stadium; Attendance: 3,203; Referee: Joni Hyytiä |

| 3 September 2023 22 | HJK | 2 – 2 | KuPS | Helsinki |
| 16:00 EEST (UTC+3) | Lingman (yellow card) 20'; Peltola 44'; Radulović 50'; Tenho (yellow card) 63' | Report | Vidjeskog 14'; Sichenje (yellow card) 40'; Yengi 58' | Stadium: Bolt Arena; Attendance: 10,121; Referee: Oliver Reitala |

===== Table =====
| Pos | Team | Pld | W | D | L | GF | GA | GD | Pts | Qualification |
|---|---|---|---|---|---|---|---|---|---|---|
| 1 | HJK | 22 | 12 | 8 | 2 | 39 | 19 | +20 | 44 | Qualification for the Championship Round |
| 2 | KuPS | 22 | 13 | 4 | 5 | 34 | 15 | +19 | 43 | Qualification for the Championship Round |
| 3 | SJK | 22 | 11 | 5 | 6 | 29 | 24 | +5 | 38 | Qualification for the Championship Round |
| 4 | VPS | 22 | 11 | 3 | 8 | 30 | 23 | +7 | 36 | Qualification for the Championship Round |
| 5 | Honka | 22 | 10 | 5 | 7 | 23 | 17 | +6 | 35 | Qualification for the Championship Round |

Source: Flashscore
Rules for classification: 1) Points; 2) Goal difference; 3) Goals scored; 4) Head-to-head points; 5) Head-to-head goal difference; 6) Head-to-head away goals scored; 7) Play-off
(Note: Play-off is only played if need to decide champion, teams for relegation or UEFA competition and will be played on a neutral ground).

==== Championship round ====
===== Results summary =====
| Overall | | | | | | | | Home | | | | | | Away | | | | | |
| Pld | W | D | L | GF | GA | GD | Pts | W | D | L | GF | GA | GD | W | D | L | GF | GA | GD |
|---|---|---|---|---|---|---|---|---|---|---|---|---|---|---|---|---|---|---|---|
| 5 | 3 | 0 | 2 | 11 | 7 | +4 | 9 | 2 | 0 | 1 | 6 | 2 | +4 | 1 | 0 | 1 | 5 | 5 | 0 |

Last updated: 21 October 2023.
Source: See Matches

===== Results =====
| 16 September 2023 23 | HJK | 2 – 0 | Inter Turku | Helsinki |
| 17:00 EEST (UTC+3) | Bandé 71'; Radulović 81' | Report | Diallo (yellow card) 3'; Jyry (yellow card) 54' (yellow-red card) 56'; Smith (yellow card) 71' | Stadium: Bolt Arena; Attendance: 4,805; Referee: Antti Munukka |

| 24 September 2023 24 | SJK | 2 – 3 | HJK | Seinäjoki |
| 17:30 EEST (UTC+3) | Tikkanen (yellow card) 25'; Moreno 83' (pen.), 85'; Gasc (yellow card) 90+2'; Dunwoody (yellow card) 90+3' | Report | Ollila 31', 48'; Keskinen (yellow card) 33'; Tanaka (yellow card) 86'; Bandé 90+2' | Stadium: OmaSP Stadion; Attendance: 3,493; Referee: Dennis Antamo |

| 27 September 2023 25 | HJK | 3 – 0 | Honka | Helsinki |
| 18:00 EEST (UTC+3) | Toivio 16'; Keskinen 50' (yellow card) 56'; Radulović 80' | Report | Arko-Mensah (yellow card) 38'; Banahene (yellow card) 90' | Stadium: Bolt Arena; Attendance: 4,235; Referee: Mohammed Al-Emara |

| 8 October 2023 26 | VPS | 3 – 2 | HJK | Vaasa |
| 16:00 EEST (UTC+3) | Bashkirov 2'; Michael 14', 90+4'; Ahiabu (yellow card) 57' | Report | Bandé 40'; Radulović 77' | Stadium: Hietalahti Stadium; Attendance: 4,105; Referee: Ville Nevalainen |

| 21 October 2023 27 | HJK | 1 – 2 | KuPS | Helsinki |
| 17:00 EEST (UTC+3) | Soiri 63'; Radulović (yellow card) 84'; Öst (yellow card) 85'; Rogić (yellow card) 86'; Hetemaj (yellow card) 90+5'; Hämäläinen (yellow card) 90+7' | Report | Éliton Júnior 8'; Saarinen 67'; Cissé (yellow card) 90+1'; Miettinen (yellow card) 90+7'; Yengi (yellow card) 90+7' | Stadium: Bolt Arena; Attendance: 10,121; Referee: Oliver Reitala |

===== Table =====
| Pos | Team | Pld | W | D | L | GF | GA | GD | Pts | Qualification |
|---|---|---|---|---|---|---|---|---|---|---|
| 1 | HJK (C) | 27 | 15 | 8 | 4 | 50 | 26 | +24 | 53 | Qualification for Champions League first qualifying round |
| 2 | KuPS | 27 | 16 | 5 | 6 | 41 | 20 | +21 | 53 | Qualification for Conference League first qualifying round |
| 3 | VPS | 27 | 15 | 4 | 8 | 41 | 26 | +15 | 49 | Qualification for Conference League first qualifying round play-off final |
| 4 | SJK | 27 | 12 | 6 | 9 | 35 | 33 | +2 | 42 | Qualification for Conference League first qualifying round play-off quarter-finals |
| 5 | Honka | 27 | 12 | 5 | 10 | 29 | 27 | +2 | 41 | Qualification for Conference League first qualifying round play-off quarter-finals |
| 6 | Inter Turku | 27 | 10 | 5 | 12 | 35 | 40 | −5 | 35 | Qualification for Conference League first qualifying round play-off quarter-finals |

Source: Flashscore
Rules for classification: 1) Points; 2) Goal difference; 3) Goals scored; 4) Head-to-head points; 5) Head-to-head goal difference; 6) Head-to-head away goals scored; 7) Play-off
(Note: Play-off is only played if need to decide champion, teams for relegation or UEFA competition and will be played on a neutral ground).
(C) Champions

=== Finnish Cup ===
| 30 May 2023 Fifth round | HJK | 1 – 1 (2 – 4 p) | Honka | Helsinki |
| 18:30 EEST (UTC+3) | Meriluoto 23' | Report | Kaufmann 60' | Stadium: Bolt Arena; Attendance: 3,093; Referee: Ville Nevalainen |
| | Penalties |
| | Möller (penalty missed); Ollila (penalty scored); Lingman (penalty scored); Olusanya (penalty missed) | | (penalty scored) Clésio; (penalty scored) Eremenko; (penalty scored) Alegría; (penalty scored) Krebs |

=== League Cup ===
==== Group Stage ====
| Pos | Team | Pld | W | D | L | GF | GA | GD | Pts | Qualification |
|---|---|---|---|---|---|---|---|---|---|---|
| 1 | HJK (Q) | 5 | 4 | 0 | 1 | 14 | 7 | +7 | 12 | Advance to knockout stage |
| 2 | Inter Turku (Q) | 5 | 3 | 1 | 1 | 7 | 3 | +4 | 10 | Advance to knockout stage |
| 3 | Lahti | 5 | 2 | 1 | 2 | 10 | 9 | +1 | 7 | |
| 4 | KTP | 5 | 1 | 2 | 2 | 3 | 6 | −3 | 5 | |
| 5 | Honka | 5 | 1 | 2 | 2 | 6 | 9 | −3 | 5 | |
| 6 | IFK Mariehamn | 5 | 0 | 2 | 3 | 1 | 7 | −6 | 2 | |

Updated to match(es) played on 4 March 2023. Source:
Rules for classification: Tiebreakers
(Q) Qualified for the phase indicated

| 27 January 2023 1 | HJK | 3 – 0 | IFK Mariehamn | Helsinki |
| 13:00 EET (UTC+2) | Meriluoto 25'; Ollila 40'; Lingman (yellow card) 53'; Tanaka 58'; Keskinen (yellow card) 60' | Report | Coubronne (yellow card) 39'; Dé (yellow card) 42'; Sjöroos (yellow card) 84' | Stadium: Bolt Arena; Attendance: 734; Referee: Joona Kontinen |

| 8 February 2023 2 | HJK | 5 – 2 | Lahti | Helsinki |
| 12:30 EET (UTC+2) | Paananen (yellow card) 2'; Keskinen (yellow card) 3' (goal) 29', 54' (pen.), 58', 60'; Pettersson (yellow card) 27' (yellow-red card) 78'; Möller 57' | Report | Ali 6'; Pirttijoki 80'; Penninkangas (yellow card) 89' | Stadium: Bolt Arena; Attendance: 217; Referee: Oliver Reitala |

| 18 February 2023 3 | HJK | 4 – 0 | Honka | Helsinki |
| 14:00 EET (UTC+2) | Meriluoto 17'; Radulović 32'; Ollila 63'; Möller 76' | Report | Baak (yellow card) 80' | Stadium: Bolt Arena; Attendance: 503; Referee: Juho Nieminen |

| 22 February 2023 4 | Inter Turku | 4 – 0 | HJK | Kupittaa |
| 14:00 EET (UTC+2) | Stavitski 7' (yellow card) 41'; Smith 13' (penalty missed) 72'; Kuittinen 37'; Jyry 58' | Report | Baranov (yellow card) 90+2' | Stadium: LähiTapiola Arena; Attendance: 1 Referee: Dennis Antamo |

| 4 March 2023 5 | KuPS | 1 – 2 | HJK | Kotka |
| 14:00 EET (UTC+2) | de Vries 10' (pen.); Vesiaho (yellow card) 42'; Sandberg (yellow card) 65' (yellow-red card) 90+3'; Ogungbaro (yellow card) 71' | Report | Meriluoto (penalty missed) 32'; Olusanya 34', 36'; Tenho (yellow card) 42'; Tanaka (yellow card) 44'; Kouassivi-Benissan (yellow card) 78'; Hetemaj (yellow card) 90+4' | Stadium: Arto Tolsa Areena; Attendance: 722; Referee: Matti Roth |

==== Knockout Stage ====
| 18 March 2023 Semifinal | HJK | 1 – 1 (5 – 4 p) | KuPS | Helsinki |
| 15:00 EET (UTC+2) | Soiri 33' | Report | Antwi (yellow card) 27'; Oksanen (yellow card) 54'; Veteli 69' | Stadium: Bolt Arena; Attendance: 845; Referee: Joona Kontinen |
| | Penalties |
| | Meriluoto (penalty scored); Tanaka (penalty scored); Olusanya (penalty scored); Peltola (penalty scored); Ezeh (penalty missed); Kanellopoulos (penalty scored) | | (penalty scored) Jensen; (penalty scored) Bakker; (penalty scored) Bispo; (penalty missed) Tuominen; (penalty scored) Vidjeskog; (penalty missed) Oksanen |

==== Final ====
| 1 April 2023 | HJK | 2 – 1 | AC Oulu | Helsinki |
| 15:00 EET (UTC+2) | Soiri (yellow card) 43'; Tanaka 83'; Stjopin 86' | Report | Luquinhas (yellow card) 30'; Affi (yellow card) 68'; Suutari (yellow card) 85' (goal) 89' | Stadium: Bolt Arena; Attendance: 1,512; Referee: Peiman Simani |

=== UEFA Champions League ===
==== Qualifying rounds ====
| 12 July 2023 First qualifying round 1st leg | HJK (Finland) | 1–0 | (Northern Ireland) Larne | Helsinki, Finland |
| 19:00 EEST (UTC+3) | Radulović 3' (pen.); Tenho (yellow card) 28' | Report | Bolger (yellow card) 32'; Cosgrove (yellow card) 46'; Want (yellow card) 89'; Donnelly (yellow card) 90+5' | Stadium: Bolt Arena; Attendance: 10,121; Referee: Goga Kikacheishvili (Georgia) |

| 19 July 2023 First qualifying round 2nd leg | Larne (Northern Ireland) | 2–2 (a.e.t.) (2–3 agg.) | (Finland) HJK | Belfast, Northern Ireland |
| 21:30 EEST (UTC+3) | Donnelly (yellow card) 47'; Bonis 65' (pen.) (yellow card) 73'; Thomson 87'; Want (yellow card) 110' | Report | Ollila 26' (yellow card) 79'; Raitala (yellow card) 64'; Tenho (yellow card) 74'; Want 97' (o.g.); Radulović (yellow card) 107' | Stadium: Solitude; Referee: Aristotelis Diamantopoulos (Greece) |
Note: Match played at the Solitude in Belfast, instead of Larne's regular stadium, Inver Park, in Larne, which did not meet UEFA requirements.

| 25 July 2023 Second qualifying round 1st leg | HJK (Finland) | 1–0 | (Norway) Molde | Helsinki, Finland |
| 19:00 EEST (UTC+3) | Keskinen 25' | Report | Brynhildsen (yellow card) 50'; Haugen (yellow card) 67' | Stadium: Bolt Arena; Attendance: 8,154; Referee: Sven Jablonski (Germany) |

| 2 August 2023 Second qualifying round 2nd leg | Molde (Norway) | 2–0 (2–1 agg.) | (Finland) HJK | Molde, Norway |
| 20:00 EEST (UTC+3) | Hagelskjær (yellow card) 64'; Öst 74' (o.g.); Brynhildsen 89' | Report | Tanaka (yellow card) 26' | Stadium: Aker Stadion; Attendance: Referee: Igor Pajač (Croatia) |

=== UEFA Europa League ===
==== Qualifying rounds ====
| 10 August 2023 Third qualifying round 1st leg | Qarabağ (Azerbaijan) | 2–1 | (Finland) HJK | Baku, Azerbaijan |
| 19:00 EEST (UTC+3) | L.Andrade 55'; Juninho 85' | Report | Radulović (yellow card) 30'; Olusanya 77' | Stadium: Tofiq Bahramov Republican Stadium; Attendance: 24,984; Referee: Roi Reinshreiber (Israel) |

| 17 August 2023 Third qualifying round 2nd leg | HJK (Finland) | 1–2 (2–4 agg.) | (Azerbaijan) Qarabağ | Helsinki, Finland |
| 19:00 EEST (UTC+3) | Hostikka 10'; Kouassivi-Benissan (yellow card) 14' (yellow-red card) 16'; Keskinen (yellow card) 45+6'; Hetemaj (yellow card) 75' | Report | Bayramov 45+3' (pen.); Benzia 56'; Magomedaliyev (yellow card) 83'; Romão (yellow card) 85' | Stadium: Bolt Arena; Attendance: 7,612; Referee: Willy Delajod (France) |

=== UEFA Europa Conference League ===
==== Qualifying rounds ====
| 24 August 2023 Playoff round 1st leg | Farul Constanța (Romania) | 2–1 | (Finland) HJK | Ovidiu, Romania |
| 20:00 EEST (UTC+3) | Larie (yellow card) 35'; Rivaldinho 58'; Munteanu (yellow card) 69'; Popescu 82' | Report | Hostikka (yellow card) 46'; Toivio 50' | Stadium: Stadionul Viitorul; Attendance: 4,032; Referee: Philip Farrugia (Malta) |

| 31 August 2023 Playoff round 2nd leg | HJK (Finland) | 2–0 (3–2 agg.) | (Romania) Farul Constanța | Helsinki, Finland |
| 19:00 EEST (UTC+3) | Radulović 20', 70'; Toivio (yellow card) 54' | Report | Nedelcu (yellow card) 37'; Kiki (yellow card) 74'; Dussaut (yellow card) 85' | Stadium: Bolt Arena; Attendance: 6,671; Referee: Sebastian Gishamer (Austria) |

==== Group stage ====
| Pos | Team | Pld | W | D | L | GF | GA | GD | Pts | Qualification |
|---|---|---|---|---|---|---|---|---|---|---|
| 1 | (Greece) PAOK | 6 | 5 | 1 | 0 | 16 | 10 | +6 | 16 | Advance to round of 16 |
| 2 | (Germany) Eintracht Frankfurt | 6 | 3 | 0 | 3 | 11 | 7 | +4 | 9 | Advance to knockout round play-offs |
| 3 | (Scotland) Aberdeen | 6 | 1 | 3 | 2 | 10 | 10 | 0 | 6 | |
| 4 | (Finland) HJK | 6 | 0 | 2 | 4 | 7 | 17 | −10 | 2 | |

Source: UEFA
Rules for classification: Group stage tiebreakers

| 21 September 2023 1 | HJK (Finland) | 2–3 | (Greece) PAOK | Helsinki, Finland |
| 19:45 EEST (UTC+3) | Bandé 35'; Hetemaj (yellow card) 61'; Radulović 90+9' (pen.) | Report | Koulierakis 55'; Despodov (yellow card) 64' (goal) 81'; Thomas 90+4' | Stadium: Bolt Arena; Attendance: 8,532; Referee: Marian Barbu (Romania) |

| 5 October 2023 2 | Aberdeen (Scotland) | 1–1 | (Finland) HJK | Aberdeen, Scotland |
| 22:00 EEST (UTC+3) | Miovski 79' | Report | Radulovic 59'; Lingman (yellow card) 90+1' | Stadium: Pittodrie Stadium; Attendance: 16,316; Referee: Daniel Stefański (Poland) |

| 26 October 2023 3 | Eintracht Frankfurt (Germany) | 6–0 | (Finland) HJK | Frankfurt, Germany |
| 22:00 EEST (UTC+3) | Dina Ebimbe 12' (pen.), 89'; Koch 27' (yellow card) 75'; Marmoush 31'; Tuta 45+3'; Skhiri 55' | Report | Tenho (yellow card) 26'; Keskinen (yellow card) 29'; Peltola (yellow card) 42' | Stadium: Waldstadion; Attendance: 55,500; Referee: Viktor Kopiyevskyi (Ukraine) |

| 9 November 2023 4 | HJK (Finland) | 0–1 | (Germany) Eintracht Frankfurt | Helsinki, Finland |
| 19:45 EET (UTC+2) | | Report | Chaïbi 31'; Buta (yellow card) 77' | Stadium: Bolt Arena; Attendance: 10,121; Referee: Pierre Gaillouste (France) |

| 30 November 2023 5 | HJK (Finland) | 2–2 | (Scotland) Aberdeen | Helsinki, Finland |
| 19:45 EET (UTC+2) | Bandé 16'; Hostikka 33'; Keskinen (yellow card) 90+9'; Lingman (yellow card) 90+15' | Report | MacDonald 41'; Barron (yellow card) 42'; Duk 56'; Devlin (yellow card) 90+9' | Stadium: Bolt Arena; Attendance: 9,053; Referee: Genc Nuza (Kosovo) |

| 14 December 2023 6 | PAOK (Greece) | 4–2 | (Finland) HJK | Thessaloniki, Greece |
| 19:45 EET (UTC+2) | Troost-Ekong (yellow card) 35'; Ozdoyev 37'; Konstantelias 47'; Toivio 53' (o.g.); Murg 85' | Report | Radulović 6'; Hostikka (yellow card) 22'; Hetemaj 90+2' (pen.) | Stadium: Toumba Stadium; Referee: Giorgi Kruashvili (Georgia) |

== Squad statistics ==
As of match played 14 December 2023

=== Appearances and goals ===
| No. | Pos | Nat | Player | Total | | Veikkausliiga | | Finnish Cup | | League Cup | | UEFA Champions League | | UEFA Europa League | | UEFA Europa Conference League | |
| No. | Pos | Nat | Player | Apps | Goals | Apps | Goals | Apps | Goals | Apps | Goals | Apps | Goals | Apps | Goals | Apps | Goals |
|---|---|---|---|---|---|---|---|---|---|---|---|---|---|---|---|---|---|
| 1 | GK | (Finland) FIN | Jesse Öst | 28 | 0 | 14 | 0 | 1 | 0 | 5 | 0 | 3+1 | 0 | 1 | 0 | 2+1 | 0 |
| 2 | DF | (Finland) FIN | Tuomas Ollila | 39 | 10 | 21+3 | 7 | 1 | 0 | 5 | 2 | 1+1 | 1 | 1+1 | 0 | 2+3 | 0 |
| 3 | DF | (Finland) FIN | Niko Hämäläinen | 13 | 0 | 5+3 | 0 | 0 | 0 | 0 | 0 | 0 | 0 | 0 | 0 | 2+3 | 0 |
| 4 | DF | (Finland) FIN | Joona Toivio | 37 | 2 | 16+3 | 1 | 0+1 | 0 | 5+1 | 0 | 3 | 0 | 2 | 0 | 6 | 1 |
| 5 | DF | (Cape Verde) CPV | Kristopher Da Graca | 9 | 0 | 5 | 0 | 0 | 0 | 0 | 0 | 0 | 0 | 0 | 0 | 2+2 | 0 |
| 6 | DF | (Finland) FIN | Aapo Halme | 15 | 0 | 6+1 | 0 | 0 | 0 | 0+1 | 0 | 0+1 | 0 | 0+1 | 0 | 5 | 0 |
| 7 | FW | (Finland) FIN | Santeri Hostikka | 35 | 5 | 15+7 | 3 | 1 | 0 | 1+2 | 0 | 1 | 0 | 1+1 | 1 | 5+1 | 1 |
| 8 | MF | (Sweden) SWE | Filip Rogić | 11 | 0 | 3+4 | 0 | 0 | 0 | 0 | 0 | 0+1 | 0 | 0+1 | 0 | 1+1 | 0 |
| 9 | FW | (Serbia) SRB | Bojan Radulović | 42 | 25 | 16+8 | 18 | 0+1 | 0 | 2+2 | 1 | 4 | 1 | 2 | 0 | 7 | 5 |
| 10 | MF | (Finland) FIN | Lucas Lingman | 36 | 0 | 14+6 | 0 | 0+1 | 0 | 0+2 | 0 | 4 | 0 | 2 | 0 | 7 | 0 |
| 11 | FW | (Finland) FIN | Roope Riski | 12 | 0 | 5+3 | 0 | 1 | 0 | 0 | 0 | 0+2 | 0 | 0 | 0 | 0+1 | 0 |
| 14 | MF | (Finland) FIN | Matti Peltola | 34 | 2 | 20+1 | 2 | 0 | 0 | 5 | 0 | 1 | 0 | 0+1 | 0 | 6 | 0 |
| 15 | DF | (Finland) FIN | Miro Tenho | 32 | 3 | 15+1 | 3 | 1 | 0 | 2+1 | 0 | 4 | 0 | 2 | 0 | 6 | 0 |
| 17 | FW | (Burkina Faso) BFA | Hassane Bandé | 14 | 5 | 2+5 | 3 | 0 | 0 | 0 | 0 | 0 | 0 | 0+1 | 0 | 4+2 | 2 |
| 18 | FW | (Finland) FIN | Topi Keskinen | 44 | 7 | 19+6 | 2 | 0+1 | 0 | 4 | 4 | 4 | 1 | 2 | 0 | 7+1 | 0 |
| 19 | MF | (Finland) FIN | Aleksi Paananen | 20 | 1 | 8+6 | 1 | 0 | 0 | 3+1 | 0 | 0 | 0 | 0 | 0 | 0+2 | 0 |
| 22 | DF | (Finland) FIN | Jukka Raitala | 35 | 0 | 20 | 0 | 0 | 0 | 1+4 | 0 | 4 | 0 | 2 | 0 | 3+1 | 0 |
| 23 | MF | (Finland) FIN | Pyry Soiri | 40 | 2 | 17+5 | 2 | 0 | 0 | 3+2 | 0 | 4 | 0 | 1 | 0 | 8 | 0 |
| 24 | MF | (Greece) GRE | Georgios Kanellopoulos | 40 | 0 | 13+7 | 0 | 1 | 0 | 5+1 | 0 | 3 | 0 | 2 | 0 | 5+3 | 0 |
| 25 | GK | (North Macedonia) MKD | Dejan Iliev | 11 | 0 | 8 | 0 | 0 | 0 | 2 | 0 | 1 | 0 | 0 | 0 | 0 | 0 |
| 27 | MF | (Finland) FIN | Kevin Kouassivi-Benissan | 26 | 0 | 5+6 | 0 | 0 | 0 | 3+1 | 0 | 2+2 | 0 | 2 | 0 | 1+4 | 0 |
| 29 | FW | (Finland) FIN | Anthony Olusanya | 37 | 5 | 14+8 | 2 | 0+1 | 0 | 3+2 | 2 | 1+3 | 0 | 0+2 | 1 | 0+3 | 0 |
| 34 | FW | (Finland) FIN | Maksim Stjopin | 10 | 2 | 3+3 | 1 | 0 | 0 | 2+2 | 1 | 0 | 0 | 0 | 0 | 0 | 0 |
| 37 | MF | (Japan) JPN | Atomu Tanaka | 32 | 3 | 14+4 | 1 | 1 | 0 | 2+3 | 2 | 3+1 | 0 | 1 | 0 | 0+3 | 0 |
| 46 | MF | (Finland) FIN | Oliver Pettersson | 8 | 0 | 0+3 | 0 | 0 | 0 | 4+1 | 0 | 0 | 0 | 0 | 0 | 0 | 0 |
| 52 | MF | (Finland) FIN | Aaro Toivonen | 1 | 0 | 0+1 | 0 | 0 | 0 | 0 | 0 | 0 | 0 | 0 | 0 | 0 | 0 |
| 56 | MF | (Finland) FIN | Përparim Hetemaj | 33 | 1 | 5+11 | 0 | 0 | 0 | 2+3 | 0 | 1+2 | 0 | 0+2 | 0 | 2+5 | 1 |
| 57 | MF | (Finland) FIN | Niilo Kujasalo | 3 | 0 | 0 | 0 | 0 | 0 | 2+1 | 0 | 0 | 0 | 0 | 0 | 0 | 0 |
| 59 | MF | (Finland) FIN | Liam Möller | 6 | 2 | 0+1 | 1 | 1 | 0 | 1+2 | 1 | 0+1 | 0 | 0 | 0 | 0 | 0 |
| 73 | FW | (Finland) FIN | David Ezeh | 5 | 0 | 0+1 | 0 | 0 | 0 | 2+2 | 0 | 0 | 0 | 0 | 0 | 0 | 0 |
| 78 | GK | (Finland) FIN | Alex Ramula | 1 | 0 | 0+1 | 0 | 0 | 0 | 0 | 0 | 0 | 0 | 0 | 0 | 0 | 0 |
| 85 | GK | (Finland) FIN | Niki Mäenpää | 11 | 0 | 4 | 0 | 0 | 0 | 0 | 0 | 0 | 0 | 1 | 0 | 6 | 0 |
Players from Klubi-04 who appeared:
| 43 | DF | (Finland) FIN | Santeri Silander | 1 | 0 | 0 | 0 | 0 | 0 | 0+1 | 0 | 0 | 0 | 0 | 0 | 0 | 0 |
| 48 | FW | (Nigeria) NGR | Francis Etu | 1 | 0 | 0 | 0 | 0 | 0 | 1 | 0 | 0 | 0 | 0 | 0 | 0 | 0 |
| 56 | DF | (Finland) FIN | William Grönblom | 1 | 0 | 0 | 0 | 0 | 0 | 1 | 0 | 0 | 0 | 0 | 0 | 0 | 0 |
| 61 | DF | (Finland) FIN | Ville Vuorinen | 1 | 0 | 0 | 0 | 0 | 0 | 1 | 0 | 0 | 0 | 0 | 0 | 0 | 0 |
| 62 | DF | (Sweden) SWE | Nils Svensson | 1 | 0 | 0 | 0 | 0 | 0 | 1 | 0 | 0 | 0 | 0 | 0 | 0 | 0 |
| 64 | MF | (Finland) FIN | Matias Ritari | 1 | 0 | 0 | 0 | 0 | 0 | 1 | 0 | 0 | 0 | 0 | 0 | 0 | 0 |
| 65 | FW | (Finland) FIN | Otto Hannula | 1 | 0 | 0 | 0 | 0 | 0 | 1 | 0 | 0 | 0 | 0 | 0 | 0 | 0 |
| 67 | FW | (Finland) FIN | Dylan Hayes | 1 | 0 | 0 | 0 | 0 | 0 | 0+1 | 0 | 0 | 0 | 0 | 0 | 0 | 0 |
| 68 | MF | (Finland) FIN | Jasper Pikkuhookana | 1 | 0 | 0 | 0 | 0 | 0 | 0+1 | 0 | 0 | 0 | 0 | 0 | 0 | 0 |
| 71 | FW | (Finland) FIN | Stanislav Baranov | 1 | 0 | 0 | 0 | 0 | 0 | 0+1 | 0 | 0 | 0 | 0 | 0 | 0 | 0 |
| 74 | MF | (Finland) FIN | Benjamin Dahlström | 1 | 0 | 0 | 0 | 0 | 0 | 1 | 0 | 0 | 0 | 0 | 0 | 0 | 0 |
| 75 | DF | (Finland) FIN | John Lietsa | 1 | 0 | 0 | 0 | 0 | 0 | 0+1 | 0 | 0 | 0 | 0 | 0 | 0 | 0 |
| 76 | FW | (Finland) FIN | Kingsley Kwasi Kwaw | 1 | 0 | 0 | 0 | 0 | 0 | 0+1 | 0 | 0 | 0 | 0 | 0 | 0 | 0 |
| 97 | DF | (Finland) FIN | Michael Boamah | 1 | 0 | 0 | 0 | 1 | 0 | 0 | 0 | 0 | 0 | 0 | 0 | 0 | 0 |
Players away from the club on loan:
| 17 | MF | (Finland) FIN | Johannes Yli-Kokko | 1 | 0 | 0 | 0 | 0 | 0 | 1 | 0 | 0 | 0 | 0 | 0 | 0 | 0 |
| 28 | DF | (Finland) FIN | Miska Ylitolva | 5 | 0 | 2+2 | 0 | 1 | 0 | 0 | 0 | 0 | 0 | 0 | 0 | 0 | 0 |
| 41 | FW | (Finland) FIN | Samuel Anini Junior | 1 | 0 | 0 | 0 | 0 | 0 | 1 | 0 | 0 | 0 | 0 | 0 | 0 | 0 |
| 42 | FW | (Finland) FIN | Kai Meriluoto | 20 | 4 | 7+7 | 2 | 1 | 0 | 4+1 | 2 | 0 | 0 | 0 | 0 | 0 | 0 |
Players who left HJK during the season:

=== Goal scorers ===
| Place | Position | Nation | Number | Name | Veikkausliiga | Finnish Cup | League Cup | UEFA Champions League | UEFA Europa League | UEFA Europa Conference League | Total |
|---|---|---|---|---|---|---|---|---|---|---|---|
| 1 | FW | (Serbia) | 9 | Bojan Radulović | 18 | 0 | 1 | 1 | 0 | 5 | 25 |
| 2 | DF | (Finland) | 2 | Tuomas Ollila | 7 | 0 | 2 | 1 | 0 | 0 | 10 |
| 3 | FW | (Finland) | 18 | Topi Keskinen | 2 | 0 | 4 | 1 | 0 | 0 | 7 |
| 5 | FW | (Finland) | 7 | Santeri Hostikka | 3 | 0 | 0 | 0 | 1 | 1 | 5 |
| 5 | FW | (Burkina Faso) | 17 | Hassane Bandé | 3 | 0 | 0 | 0 | 0 | 2 | 5 |
| 5 | FW | (Finland) | 42 | Kai Meriluoto | 2 | 1 | 2 | 0 | 0 | 0 | 5 |
| 5 | FW | (Finland) | 29 | Anthony Olusanya | 2 | 0 | 2 | 0 | 1 | 0 | 5 |
| 8 | DF | (Finland) | 15 | Miro Tenho | 3 | 0 | 0 | 0 | 0 | 0 | 3 |
| 8 | MF | (Japan) | 37 | Atomu Tanaka | 1 | 0 | 2 | 0 | 0 | 0 | 3 |
| 10 | MF | (Finland) | 14 | Matti Peltola | 2 | 0 | 0 | 0 | 0 | 0 | 2 |
| 10 | MF | (Finland) | 23 | Pyry Soiri | 2 | 0 | 0 | 0 | 0 | 0 | 2 |
| 10 | MF | (Finland) | 59 | Liam Möller | 1 | 0 | 1 | 0 | 0 | 0 | 2 |
| 10 | FW | (Finland) | 34 | Maksim Stjopin | 1 | 0 | 1 | 0 | 0 | 0 | 2 |
| 10 | DF | (Finland) | 4 | Joona Toivio | 1 | 0 | 0 | 0 | 0 | 1 | 2 |
| 10 | | | | Own goal | 1 | 0 | 0 | 1 | 0 | 0 | 2 |
| 16 | MF | (Finland) | 19 | Aleksi Paananen | 1 | 0 | 0 | 0 | 0 | 0 | 1 |
| 16 | MF | (Finland) | 56 | Përparim Hetemaj | 0 | 0 | 0 | 0 | 0 | 1 | 1 |
| TOTALS | | | | | 50 | 1 | 15 | 4 | 2 | 10 | 82 |

=== Clean sheets ===
| Place | Position | Nation | Number | Name | Veikkausliiga | Finnish Cup | League Cup | UEFA Champions League | UEFA Europa League | UEFA Europa Conference League | Total |
|---|---|---|---|---|---|---|---|---|---|---|---|
| 1 | GK | (Finland) | 1 | Jesse Öst | 6 | 0 | 1 | 2 | 0 | 0 | 9 |
| 2 | GK | (North Macedonia) | 25 | Dejan Iliev | 3 | 0 | 1 | 0 | 0 | 0 | 4 |
| 3 | GK | (Finland) | 85 | Niki Mäenpää | 1 | 0 | 0 | 0 | 0 | 1 | 2 |
| TOTALS | | | | | 10 | 0 | 2 | 2 | 0 | 1 | 15 |

=== Disciplinary record ===
| Number | Nation | Position | Name | Veikkausliiga | | Finnish Cup | | League Cup | | UEFA Champions League | | UEFA Europa League | | UEFA Europa Conference League | | Total | |
| Number | Nation | Position | Name | Yellow card | Red card | Yellow card | Red card | Yellow card | Red card | Yellow card | Red card | Yellow card | Red card | Yellow card | Red card | Yellow card | Red card |
| 1 | (Finland) | GK | Jesse Öst | 1 | 0 | 0 | 0 | 0 | 0 | 0 | 0 | 0 | 0 | 0 | 0 | 1 | 0 |
| 2 | (Finland) | DF | Tuomas Ollila | 3 | 0 | 0 | 0 | 0 | 0 | 1 | 0 | 0 | 0 | 0 | 0 | 4 | 0 |
| 3 | (Finland) | DF | Niko Hämäläinen | 1 | 0 | 0 | 0 | 0 | 0 | 0 | 0 | 0 | 0 | 0 | 0 | 1 | 0 |
| 4 | (Finland) | DF | Joona Toivio | 1 | 2 | 0 | 0 | 0 | 0 | 0 | 0 | 0 | 0 | 1 | 0 | 2 | 2 |
| 6 | (Finland) | DF | Aapo Halme | 1 | 0 | 0 | 0 | 0 | 0 | 0 | 0 | 0 | 0 | 0 | 0 | 1 | 0 |
| 7 | (Finland) | FW | Santeri Hostikka | 1 | 0 | 0 | 0 | 0 | 0 | 0 | 0 | 0 | 0 | 2 | 0 | 3 | 0 |
| 8 | (Sweden) | MF | Filip Rogić | 2 | 0 | 0 | 0 | 0 | 0 | 0 | 0 | 0 | 0 | 0 | 0 | 2 | 0 |
| 9 | (Serbia) | FW | Bojan Radulović | 2 | 0 | 0 | 0 | 0 | 0 | 1 | 0 | 1 | 0 | 0 | 0 | 4 | 0 |
| 10 | (Finland) | MF | Lucas Lingman | 1 | 0 | 0 | 0 | 1 | 0 | 0 | 0 | 0 | 0 | 2 | 0 | 4 | 0 |
| 14 | (Finland) | MF | Matti Peltola | 3 | 0 | 0 | 0 | 0 | 0 | 0 | 0 | 0 | 0 | 1 | 0 | 4 | 0 |
| 15 | (Finland) | DF | Miro Tenho | 3 | 0 | 1 | 0 | 1 | 0 | 2 | 0 | 0 | 0 | 1 | 0 | 8 | 0 |
| 18 | (Finland) | FW | Topi Keskinen | 4 | 0 | 0 | 0 | 2 | 0 | 0 | 0 | 1 | 0 | 2 | 0 | 9 | 0 |
| 19 | (Finland) | MF | Aleksi Paananen | 2 | 0 | 0 | 0 | 1 | 0 | 0 | 0 | 0 | 0 | 0 | 0 | 3 | 0 |
| 22 | (Finland) | DF | Jukka Raitala | 1 | 0 | 0 | 0 | 0 | 0 | 1 | 0 | 0 | 0 | 0 | 0 | 2 | 0 |
| 23 | (Finland) | MF | Pyry Soiri | 2 | 0 | 0 | 0 | 1 | 0 | 0 | 0 | 0 | 0 | 0 | 0 | 3 | 0 |
| 24 | (Greece) | MF | Georgios Kanellopoulos | 3 | 0 | 1 | 0 | 0 | 0 | 0 | 0 | 0 | 0 | 0 | 0 | 4 | 0 |
| 25 | (North Macedonia) | GK | Dejan Iliev | 1 | 0 | 0 | 0 | 0 | 0 | 0 | 0 | 0 | 0 | 0 | 0 | 1 | 0 |
| 27 | (Finland) | MF | Kevin Kouassivi-Benissan | 0 | 0 | 0 | 0 | 1 | 0 | 0 | 0 | 2 | 1 | 0 | 0 | 3 | 1 |
| 29 | (Finland) | FW | Anthony Olusanya | 2 | 0 | 0 | 0 | 0 | 0 | 0 | 0 | 0 | 0 | 0 | 0 | 2 | 0 |
| 37 | (Japan) | MF | Atomu Tanaka | 4 | 0 | 0 | 0 | 1 | 0 | 1 | 0 | 0 | 0 | 0 | 0 | 6 | 0 |
| 46 | (Finland) | MF | Oliver Pettersson | 0 | 0 | 0 | 0 | 2 | 1 | 0 | 0 | 0 | 0 | 0 | 0 | 2 | 1 |
| 56 | (Finland) | MF | Përparim Hetemaj | 3 | 1 | 0 | 0 | 2 | 0 | 0 | 0 | 1 | 0 | 1 | 0 | 7 | 1 |
Players from Klubi-04:
| 71 | (Finland) | FW | Stanislav Baranov | 0 | 0 | 0 | 0 | 1 | 0 | 0 | 0 | 0 | 0 | 0 | 0 | 1 | 0 |
Players away on loan:
| 42 | (Finland) | FW | Kai Meriluoto | 1 | 0 | 0 | 0 | 0 | 0 | 0 | 0 | 0 | 0 | 0 | 0 | 1 | 0 |
Players who left HJK during the season:
| TOTALS | | | | 42 | 3 | 2 | 0 | 13 | 1 | 6 | 0 | 5 | 1 | 10 | 0 | 78 | 5 |
