= Hassane Bandé =

Burkinabé footballer (born 1998)

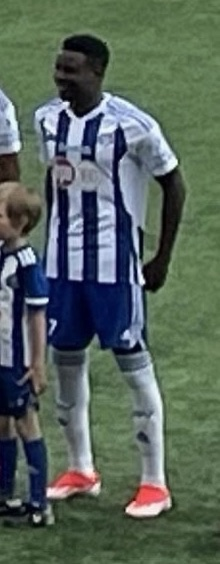
- Bande with HJK in 2024

Personal information
- Full name: Boureima Hassane Bandé
- Date of birth: 30 October 1998 (age 28)
- Place of birth: Ouagadougou, Burkina Faso
- Height: 1.78 m (5 ft 10 in)
- Positions: Forward; winger

Youth career
- –2017: Salitas

Senior career*
Years	Team	Apps	(Gls)
2017–2018	Mechelen	25	(11)
2018–2022	Jong Ajax	8	(0)
2018–2022	Ajax	0	(0)
2020	→ Thun (loan)	13	(0)
2021–2022	→ Istra 1961 (loan)	45	(8)
2022–2023	Amiens	19	(1)
2023–2025	HJK	33	(6)
2025–2026	Mechelen	7	(0)

International career^{‡}
2017–	Burkina Faso	38	(3)
- * Club domestic league appearances and goals as of 31 May 2026 ‡ National team caps and goals as of 24 March 2025

Boureima Hassane Bandé (born 30 October 1998) is a Burkinabé professional footballer who plays as a striker for the Burkina Faso national team.

== Club career ==
=== Mechelen ===
Bandé made his professional debut for Mechelen in a 2–1 Belgian First Division A loss to Royal Antwerp F.C. on 19 August 2017, and scored his team's only goal despite coming on as a late substitute. Bandé became a first-team regular, scoring nine goals in his first fifteen games. Amid growing interest from many clubs, including Manchester United and Arsenal, on 4 December 2017, Bandé agreed to join Ajax at the end of the 2017–18 season for a reported fee of €9.5 million. He finished the season with 27 appearances and 12 goals, though Mechelen still finished bottom of the Belgian First Division and were relegated.

=== Ajax ===
On 4 December 2017, Bandé signed for Ajax in a deal that saw him leave Mechelen after the 2017–18 season. However, Bandé broke his calf bone and ruptured his ankle ligament during the preparation of the 2018–19 season in a friendly game against Anderlecht. A year later, in September 2019, he finally recovered from these injuries and was registered for Jong Ajax.

Bandé made four appearances for Jong Ajax, before he on 27 January 2020 was sent out on loan to Swiss club FC Thun until 30 June 2021. Thun was relegated at the end of the 2019–20 season and Bandé returned early to Ajax in October 2020.

On 9 February 2021, Bandé was sent on loan to Croatian First Football League club Istra 1961 for a season and a half.

=== Amiens ===
On 24 August 2022, Bandé signed a three-year contract with French Ligue 2 club Amiens. He left the club after one season.

=== HJK ===
On 11 August 2023, Bandé signed a two-year deal with Finnish champions HJK for an undisclosed fee. Bandé scored his first goal in Veikkausliiga on 16 September 2023, in a 2–0 win against Inter Turku. Bandé made his first start, and scored HJK's first goal, in the 2023–24 UEFA Europa Conference League group stage opening match against PAOK in a 2–3 loss. He made a total of seven appearances in HJK's 2023–24 European campaign, scoring twice.

=== Return to Mechelen ===
On 23 October 2025, Bandé returned to Mechelen on a one-season contract after a trial.

== International career ==
Bandé made his professional debut for the Burkina Faso national team in a 4–0 2018 World Cup qualification win over Cape Verde on 14 November 2017.

He was named in the Burkina Faso squad in the delayed 2023 Africa Cup of Nations tournament.

== Career statistics ==
=== Club ===
As of 19 May 2025

Appearances and goals by club, season and competition
Club	Season	League			National cup (Note: Includes Belgian Cup, Croatian Cup, Coupe de France and Suomen Cup)		League cup (Note: Includes Finnish League Cup)		Europe		Total	
Club	Season	Division	Apps	Goals	Apps	Goals	Apps	Goals	Apps	Goals	Apps	Goals
KV Mechelen	2017–18	Belgian First Division A	25	11	2	1	—		—		27	12
Jong Ajax	2018–19	Eerste Divisie	0	0	0	0	—		—		0	0
Jong Ajax	2019–20	Eerste Divisie	4	0	0	0	—		—		0	0
Jong Ajax	2020–21	Eerste Divisie	4	0	0	0	—		—		0	0
Jong Ajax	Total		8	0	0	0	0	0	0	0	8	0
Thun (loan)	2019–20	Swiss Super League	13	0	0	0	—		—		13	0
Istra 1961 (loan)	2020–21	1. HNL	16	1	4	0	—		—		20	1
Istra 1961 (loan)	2021–22	1. HNL	29	7	2	0	—		—		31	7
Istra 1961 (loan)	Total		45	8	6	0	0	0	0	0	51	8
Amiens	2022–23	Ligue 2	19	1	2	0	—		—		21	1
HJK	2023	Veikkausliiga	7	3	0	0	0	0	7 (Note: One appearance in UEFA Europa League, six appearances in UEFA Europa Conference League)	2	14	5
HJK	2024	Veikkausliiga	21	3	1	0	0	0	9 (Note: Appearances in UEFA Champions League and UEFA Conference League)	0	31	3
HJK	2025	Veikkausliiga	5	0	0	0	5	2	0	0	10	2
HJK	Total		33	6	1	0	5	2	16	2	55	10
Career total			143	26	11	1	5	2	16	2	175	31

=== International ===
As of match played 24 March 2025

Burkina Faso
Year	Apps	Goals
2015	1	0
2016	0	0
2017	1	0
2018	3	0
2019	0	0
2020	0	0
2021	8	0
2022	10	2
2023	2	0
2024	11	1
2025	2	0
Total	38	3

=== International goals ===
As of match played 10 September 2024. Burkina Faso score listed first, score column indicates score after each Bandé goal.

List of international goals scored by Hassane Bandé
No.	Date	Venue	Opponent	Score	Result	Competition
1	13 January 2022	Olembe Stadium, Yaoundé, Cameroon	Cape Verde	1–0	1–0	2021 Africa Cup of Nations
2	3 June 2022	Marrakesh Stadium, Marrakesh, Morocco	Cape Verde	1–0	2–0	2023 Africa Cup of Nations qualification
3	10 September 2024	Stade du 26 Mars, Bamako, Mali	Malawi	3–0	3–1	2025 Africa Cup of Nations qualification

== Honours ==
Ajax

- Eredivisie: 2018–19
- KNVB Cup: 2018–19

HJK

- Veikkausliiga: 2023
- Finnish League Cup runner-up: 2025
