= Maksim Stjopin =

Finnish footballer (born 2003)

Personal information
- Date of birth: 8 April 2003 (age 23)
- Place of birth: Estonia
- Height: 1.78 m (5 ft 10 in)
- Position: Forward

Team information
- Current team: Ilves
- Number: 8

Youth career
- TaFa
- –2016: TPV
- 2017–2019: Ilves

Senior career*
Years	Team	Apps	(Gls)
2020	Ilves II	13	(5)
2020	Ilves	3	(2)
2021–2023	Nordsjælland	0	(0)
2023	→ HJK (loan)	6	(1)
2024–	Ilves	64	(10)

International career^{‡}
2019	Finland U16	6	(3)
2019–2020	Finland U17	13	(0)
2021	Finland U19	7	(0)
2021	Finland U20	2	(0)
2023	Finland U21	3	(0)
- * Club domestic league appearances and goals as of 13 November 2026 ‡ National team caps and goals as of 28 March 2023 (UTC)

Maksim Stjopin (born 8 April 2003) is a Finnish professional footballer who plays as a forward for Veikkausliiga club Ilves.

== Early life ==
Stjopin moved from Estonia to Tampere, Finland, when he was one year old.

== Career ==
On 3 February 2020 it was confirmed by Ilves, that Stjopin had been sold to Danish Superliga club FC Nordsjælland. However, Stjopin was registered for the clubs U-19 squad. On transfer deadline day, 31 January 2023, Stjopin joined HJK on a loan deal for the 2023 season.

== Career statistics ==
As of 13 November 2026

Club	Season	League			Cup (Note: Includes Danish Cup and Suomen Cup)		League cup		Europe		Total	
Club	Season	Division	Apps	Goals	Apps	Goals	Apps	Goals	Apps	Goals	Apps	Goals
Ilves II	2020	Kakkonen	13	5	–		–		–		13	5
Ilves	2020	Veikkausliiga	3	2	0	0	–		0	0	3	2
Nordsjælland	2022–23	Danish Superliga	0	0	1	0	–		–		1	0
HJK (loan)	2023	Veikkausliiga	6	1	0	0	4	1	0	0	10	2
Ilves	2024	Veikkausliiga	16	3	1	0	4	0	1 (Note: Includes UEFA Conference League)	0	22	3
Ilves	2025	Veikkausliiga	30	4	1	0	6	1	4 (Note: Two appearances in UEFA Europa League, two appearances in UEFA Conference League)	0	41	5
Ilves	2026	Veikkausliiga	18	3	2	3	6	2	0	0	26	8
Ilves	Total		64	10	4	3	16	3	5	0	89	16
Career total			86	18	5	3	20	4	5	0	116	25

== Honours ==
HJK

- Veikkausliiga: 2023
- Finnish League Cup: 2023

Ilves

- Veikkausliiga runner-up: 2024
