= Anthony Olusanya =

Finnish footballer (born 2000)

Personal information
- Full name: Anthony Juhani Olusanya
- Date of birth: 1 February 2000 (age 26)
- Place of birth: Jakobstad, Finland
- Height: 1.83 m (6 ft 0 in)
- Position: Forward

Team information
- Current team: St Patrick's Athletic
- Number: 21

Youth career
- Pietarsaaren Into
- –2017: Jaro

Senior career*
Years	Team	Apps	(Gls)
2017–2020	JBK	9	(1)
2018–2020	Jaro	60	(18)
2021–2024	HJK	75	(14)
2021	→ Klubi 04 (loan)	2	(0)
2024	→ Haka (loan)	10	(7)
2025–2026	Kalmar	39	(8)
2026–	St Patrick's Athletic	11	(2)

International career^{‡}
2021	Finland U21	7	(1)
2023–	Finland	2	(0)
- * Club domestic league appearances and goals as of 23:33, 30 October 2026 (UTC) ‡ National team caps and goals as of 20:51, 9 August 2026 (UTC)

Anthony Juhani Olusanya (born 1 February 2000) is a Finnish professional footballer who plays as a forward for League of Ireland Premier Division club St Patrick's Athletic on loan from Swedish side Kalmar FF.

== Club career ==
Olusanya started football in Pietarsaaren Into and later joined FF Jaro youth sector.

On 30 September 2021, when playing for HJK Helsinki in a UEFA Europa Conference League group phase game against Alashkert, he came on as a late substitute for Roope Riski and scored his first goal in a European club competition. HJK eventually won the game 4–2.

On 12 August 2024, he was loaned out to FC Haka for the rest of the season. He made 10 appearances and scored seven goals for Haka, before returning to his parent club HJK after the season.

In January 2025, Olusanya joined Swedish side Kalmar on a two-year deal. According to Österbottens Tidning, HJK's asking price for Olusanya was €110,000. On 3 March, he scored his first goal for Kalmar, in a Svenska Cupen match against Hammarby.

On 28 July 2026, Olusanya signed for League of Ireland Premier Division club St Patrick's Athletic. On 2 August 2026, he replaced Aidan Keena from the bench to make his debut for the club in a 1–1 draw with Derry City at Richmond Park. The following game, he started for the first time and opened the scoring in a 2–1 victory away to Shelbourne with a 7th minute volley. On 21 August 2026, he opened the scoring in a 2–0 victory away to Drogheda United.

== International career ==
Born in Jakobstad, Finland, Olusanya is of Nigerian descent on his father's side but does not have Nigerian citizenship. His mother is of Finnish background.

He made his debut for the Finland U21 team on 3 June 2021 in a friendly match against Sweden U21. He then scored his first international goal against Estonia U21 on 3 September 2021 in an Under-21 European Championship qualifier.

Olusanya made his senior debut for Finland on 9 January 2023 in a 2–0 loss to Sweden in a friendly replacing Kai Meriluoto from the bench in the 77th minute.

== Career statistics ==
As of match played on 30 October 2026

Appearances and goals by club, season and competition
Club	Season	League			National cup (Note: Includes Finnish Cup, Svenska Cupen & FAI Cup)		League cup (Note: Includes Finnish League Cup)		Europe		Total	
Club	Season	Division	Apps	Goals	Apps	Goals	Apps	Goals	Apps	Goals	Apps	Goals
Jakobstads BK	2017	Kakkonen	4	0	–		–		–		4	0
Jakobstads BK	2018	Kakkonen	1	1	1	0	–		–		2	2
Jakobstads BK	2019	Kakkonen	3	0	–		–		–		3	0
Jakobstads BK	2020	Kakkonen	1	0	–		–		–		1	0
Jakobstads BK	Total		9	1	1	0	–		–		10	1
Jaro	2018	Ykkönen	20	1	3	0	–		–		23	1
Jaro	2019	Ykkönen	19	6	4	0	–		–		23	6
Jaro	2020	Ykkönen	21	11	3	1	–		–		24	12
Jaro	Total		60	18	10	1	–		–		70	19
Klubi 04	2021	Ykkönen	2	0	–		–		–		2	0
HJK Helsinki	2021	Veikkausliiga	16	3	3	0	–		7 (Note: 1 appearances UEFA Champions League; 2 appearances in the UEFA Europa League; 4 appearances, 1 goal in the UEFA Europa Conference League)	1	26	4
HJK Helsinki	2022	Veikkausliiga	21	7	3	0	1	0	12 (Note: 2 appearances in the UEFA Champions League; 10 appearances in the UEFA Europa League)	0	37	7
HJK Helsinki	2023	Veikkausliiga	22	2	1	0	5	2	9 (Note: 4 appearances in the UEFA Champions League; 2 appearances, 1 goal in the UEFA Europa League; 3 appearances in the UEFA Europa Conference League)	1	37	5
HJK Helsinki	2024	Veikkausliiga	16	2	1	0	3	3	0	0	20	5
HJK Helsinki	Total		75	14	8	0	9	5	28	2	120	21
Haka (loan)	2024	Veikkausliiga	10	7	–		–		–		10	7
Kalmar FF	2025	Superettan	27	6	3	1	–		–		30	7
Kalmar FF	2026	Allsvenskan	12	2	4	2	–		–		16	4
Kalmar FF	Total		39	8	7	3	–		–		46	11
St Patrick's Athletic	2026	LOI Premier Division	11	2	2	0	–		–		13	2
Career total			206	50	28	4	9	5	28	2	271	61

=== International ===
As of match played 12 January 2023

Finland
Year	Apps	Goals
2023	2	0
Total	2	0
