= Niilo Kujasalo =

Finnish footballer (born 2004)

Personal information
- Full name: Niilo Juhani Kujasalo
- Date of birth: 17 March 2004 (age 22)
- Place of birth: Helsinki, Finland
- Height: 1.82 m (6 ft 0 in)
- Position: Midfielder

Team information
- Current team: KuPS
- Number: 13

Youth career
- –2015: KäPa
- 2015–2021: HJK

Senior career*
Years	Team	Apps	(Gls)
2022–2024	Klubi 04	34	(5)
2022–2024	HJK	0	(0)
2023	→ KPV (loan)	25	(3)
2025	IFK Mariehamn	27	(2)
2026-	KuPS	16	(0)

International career^{‡}
2019	Finland U15	3	(0)
2019	Finland U16	4	(0)
2021–2022	Finland U18	6	(0)
2022	Finland U19	5	(0)
2025–	Finland U21	3	(0)
- * Club domestic league appearances and goals as of 12 November 2026 ‡ National team caps and goals as of 31 March 2026

Niilo Juhani Kujasalo (born 17 March 2004) is a Finnish professional footballer who plays as a midfielder for Veikkausliiga club KuPS.

== Career ==
After playing in a youth sector of Käpylän Pallo (KäPa), Kujasalo joined HJK Helsinki youth academy at the age of 11.

On 14 January 2022, he signed a new deal and was promoted to the club's reserve team Klubi 04 squad, playing in third-tier level Kakkonen. He made his debut with HJK first team on 2 March 2022, in a pre-season Finnish League Cup loss against FC Honka. On 14 December 2022, Kujasalo renewed his contract with HJK until the end of 2024, with a deal including an option to extend.

On 20 April 2023, Kujasalo was loaned out to Kokkolan Pallo-Veikot (KPV) for the 2023 season, playing in second-tier level Ykkönen.

On 6 November 2024, Kujasalo joined Veikkausliiga club IFK Mariehamn on a two-year deal, starting in 2025. He scored his first league goal on 27 April, in a home match against Ilves.

On 24 December 2025, Kuopion Palloseura (KuPS) reported that they have signed Kujasalo on a two-year initial deal, that includes an option for a third year. KuPS paid a transfer fee to IFK Mariehamn.

== International career ==
Kujasalo has represented Finland at various youth international levels.

== Career statistics ==
As of 27 April 2025

Appearances and goals by club, season and competition
Club	Season	League			Cup (Note: Includes Suomen Cup)		League cup (Note: Includes Finnish League Cup)		Europe		Total	
Club	Season	Division	Apps	Goals	Apps	Goals	Apps	Goals	Apps	Goals	Apps	Goals
Klubi 04	2022	Kakkonen	25	3	2	0	—		—		27	3
Klubi 04	2023	Kakkonen	0	0	0	0	—		—		0	0
Klubi 04	2024	Ykkönen	9	2	—		—		—		9	2
Klubi 04	Total		34	5	0	0	4	0	0	0	34	5
HJK	2022	Veikkausliiga	0	0	0	0	1	0	0	0	1	0
HJK	2023	Veikkausliiga	0	0	0	0	3	0	0	0	3	0
HJK	2024	Veikkausliiga	0	0	0	0	0	0	0	0	0	0
HJK	Total		0	0	0	0	4	0	0	0	4	0
KPV (loan)	2023	Ykkönen	25	3	4	0	0	0	—		29	3
IFK Mariehamn	2025	Veikkausliiga	5	1	1	0	4	0	–		10	1
Career total			60	7	7	0	8	0	0	0	75	7

== Honours ==
HJK

- Finnish League Cup: 2023
