= Niko Hämäläinen =

Finnish footballer (born 1997)

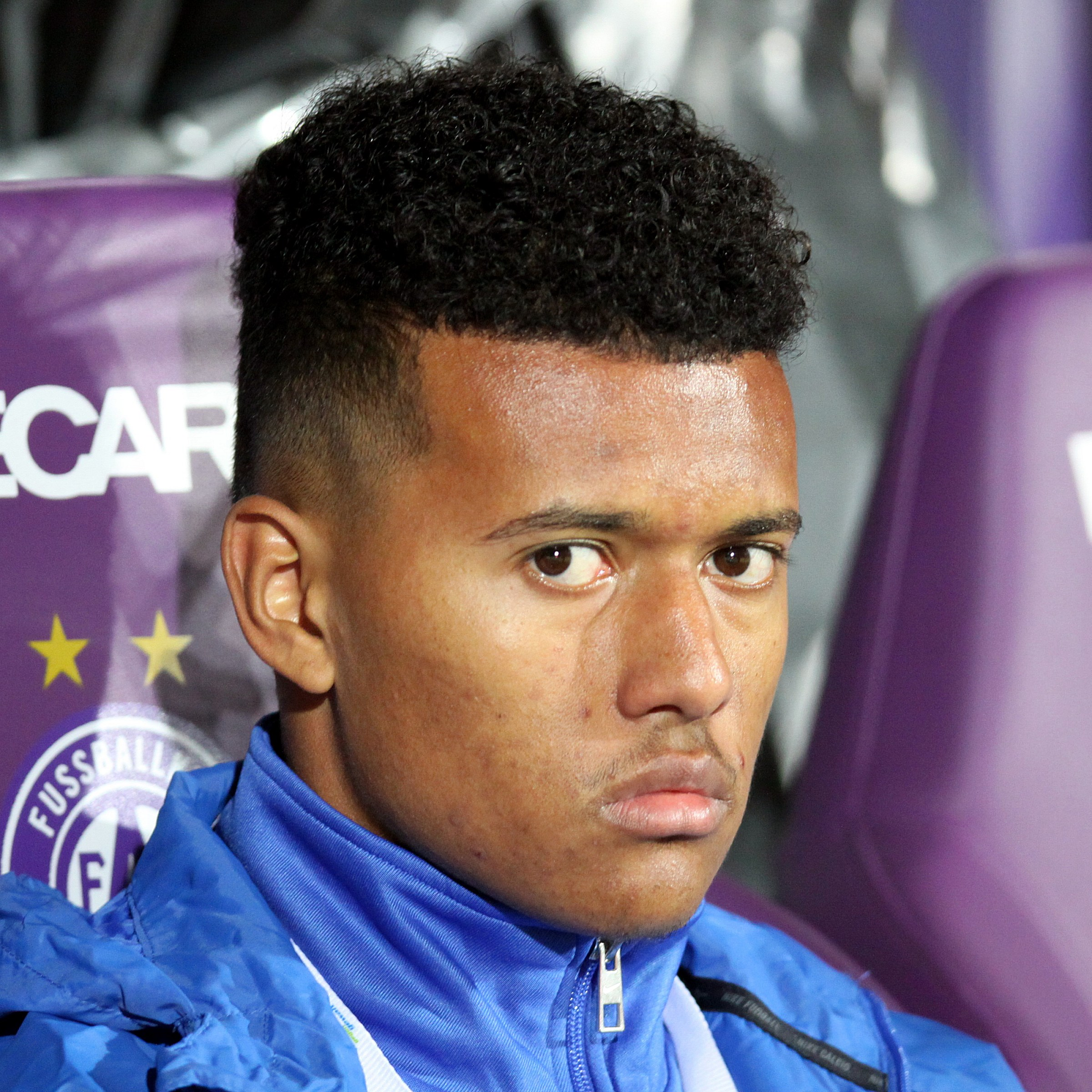
- Hämäläinen on the bench for the Finland U21 in 2015

Personal information
- Full name: Nicholas Antero Hämäläinen
- Date of birth: 5 March 1997 (age 29)
- Place of birth: West Palm Beach, Florida, United States
- Height: 1.84 m (6 ft 0 in)
- Position: Left-back

Team information
- Current team: New Mexico United
- Number: 2

Youth career
- 2010: Wellington Wave SC
- 2010–2013: FC Florida
- 2013–2014: FC Dallas
- 2014–2015: Queens Park Rangers

Senior career*
Years	Team	Apps	(Gls)
2015–2023	Queens Park Rangers	30	(0)
2015	→ Dagenham & Redbridge (loan)	1	(0)
2019	→ Los Angeles FC (loan)	3	(0)
2019–2020	→ Kilmarnock (loan)	28	(0)
2021	→ LA Galaxy (loan)	14	(0)
2022	→ Botafogo (loan)	1	(0)
2023	→ RWDM (loan)	4	(0)
2023	HJK	8	(0)
2025	KuPS	12	(0)
2025–2026	Haugesund	13	(1)
2026–	New Mexico United	29	(0)

International career^{‡}
2015	Finland U18	12	(1)
2015	Finland U19	2	(0)
2017–2018	Finland U21	12	(0)
2019–	Finland	12	(0)
- * Club domestic league appearances and goals as of 09:56, 10 November 2026 (UTC) ‡ National team caps and goals as of 13:04, 13 April 2022 (UTC)

Nicholas Antero "Niko" Hämäläinen (born 5 March 1997) is a professional footballer who plays as a left-back for USL Championship club New Mexico United. Born and raised in the United States, he plays for the Finland national team thanks to his eligibility through his Finnish father. He represented Finland at various youth levels before making his senior debut against Estonia on 11 January 2019.

== Club career ==
=== Queens Park Rangers ===
On 18 September 2014, Hämäläinen signed for Queens Park Rangers from the FC Dallas Academy. Former West Ham midfielder Ian Bishop, a family friend, arranged a trial for Hämäläinen, where he was spotted by QPR.

==== Dagenham & Redbridge loan ====
On 6 August 2015, Hämäläinen signed on an emergency loan deal at Dagenham & Redbridge until 5 September 2015.

Hämäläinen made his professional debut on 12 August 2015, in Dagenham & Redbridge's 1–4 loss to Charlton Athletic in the League Cup. He was named in the starting eleven and was replaced by Ashley Hemmings in the 58th minute. His loan was extended in September 2015 for an additional month.

==== Return to QPR ====
He made his league debut for QPR as a substitute for Joel Lynch in a 2–1 win against West London rivals Fulham on 1 October 2016. He made his first appearance in the starting lineup on 22 October 2016, in a match against Sheffield Wednesday.

==== Los Angeles FC loan ====
On 25 February 2019, Hämäläinen joined Major League Soccer side Los Angeles FC on a six-month loan deal. Prior to his signing, Jordan Harvey was the only recognised left-back at LAFC. After the announcement of the signing, general manager John Thorrington said “Niko has a bright future ahead of him and we look forward to furthering his professional development at LAFC... I am confident he will prove to be a valuable addition to the group". He made his debut when he came off the bench in the 81st minute and made an assist in the 90+2 minute for the winner in a 2–1 win over Real Salt Lake.

==== Kilmarnock loan ====
Hämäläinen was loaned to Scottish Premiership club Kilmarnock in August 2019. His decision to move to Scotland was influenced by compatriot Glen Kamara, who plays for Rangers, and Lee Wallace, a teammate of Hämäläinen's at QPR, having joined from Rangers himself in June 2019. So far in 2019–20, Hämäläinen has been named in the Scottish Premiership team of the week twice.

==== LA Galaxy (loan) ====
On 6 August 2021, Hämäläinen returned to Major League Soccer and joined LA Galaxy on loan through the end of the 2021 season.

==== Botafogo FR (loan) ====
On 12 April 2022, Hämäläinen signed a loan contract for Botafogo FR until July.

==== RWDM (loan) ====
On 31 January 2023, Hämäläinen was loaned to RWDM in the Belgian second-tier Challenger Pro League.

On 29 June 2023, Hämäläinen departed Queens Park Rangers following the mutual termination of his contract.

==== HJK ====
On 24 July 2023, Hämäläinen signed a deal with HJK for the rest of the 2023 season.

==== New Mexico United ====
On 9 March 2026, USL Championship club New Mexico United announced they had signed Hämäläinen for the 2026 season.

== International career ==
Hämäläinen was eligible for the United States and Finland, having been born and raised in the United States to a Finnish father. He originally played as a youth international for Finland.

He made his senior debut for the Finland national football team on 11 January 2019, at Khalifa International Stadium in Doha, Qatar, in a friendly match against Estonia. He played for 84 minutes until he was replaced by Juha Pirinen.

On 30 August 2019, Hämäläinen accepted a call to the United States under-23s, his first call-up to the United States at any level.

Hämäläinen made his competitive debut for Finland against the Republic of Ireland in the UEFA Nations League on 6 September 2020, thus tying him to the Finland national team.

Hämäläinen was called up for the UEFA Euro 2020 pre-tournament friendly match against Sweden on 29 May 2021, and later for the tournament itself

== Personal life ==
Hämäläinen was born and raised in the United States. He is of African-American and Finnish descent. He is the son of Timo Hämäläinen, who played for the Finnish football club Koparit in 1978–1982 in the SM-sarja before moving to the United States to work.

== Career statistics ==
=== Club ===
As of 2 August 2025

Appearances and goals by club, season and competition
Club	Season	League			National cup (Note: Includes FA Cup, Scottish Cup and Copa do Brasil, Finnish Cup)		League cup (Note: Includes EFL League Cup, Scottish League Cup)		Continental		Total	
Club	Season	Division	Apps	Goals	Apps	Goals	Apps	Goals	Apps	Goals	Apps	Goals
Queen's Park Rangers	2015–16	Championship	0	0	0	0	0	0	—		0	0
Queen's Park Rangers	2016–17	Championship	3	0	0	0	1	0	—		4	0
Queen's Park Rangers	2017–18	Championship	0	0	0	0	0	0	—		0	0
Queen's Park Rangers	2018–19	Championship	0	0	0	0	2	0	—		2	0
Queen's Park Rangers	2019–20	Championship	0	0	0	0	0	0	—		0	0
Queen's Park Rangers	2020–21	Championship	22	0	1	0	0	0	—		23	0
Queen's Park Rangers	2021–22	Championship	0	0	0	0	0	0	—		0	0
Queen's Park Rangers	2022–23	Championship	2	0	1	0	1	0	—		4	0
Queen's Park Rangers	Total		27	0	2	0	4	0	0	0	33	0
Dagenham & Redbridge (loan)	2015–16	League Two	1	0	0	0	1	0	0	0	2	0
Los Angeles FC (loan)	2019	MLS	3	0	0	0	—		—		3	0
Kilmarnock (loan)	2019–20	Scottish Premiership	28	0	3	0	1	0	0	0	32	0
LA Galaxy (loan)	2021	MLS	14	0	0	0	—		—		14	0
Botafogo (loan)	2022	Série A	0	0	1	0	—		—		1	0
RWDM (loan)	2022–23	Challenger Pro League	4	0	0	0	—		0	0	4	0
HJK	2023	Veikkausliiga	8	0	0	0	0	0	5 (Note: Appearances in UEFA Europa Conference League)	0	13	0
KuPS	2025	Veikkausliiga	12	0	1	0	0	0	4 (Note: Appearances in UEFA Champions League)	0	17	0
KuPS Akatemia	2025	Ykkönen	1	0	—		—		—		1	0
Haugesund	2025	Eliteserien	0	0	0	0	—		—		0	0
Career total			98	0	7	0	6	0	9	0	120	0

=== International ===
As of match played on 10 September 2023.

Appearances and goals by national team and year
National team	Year	Apps	Goals
Finland	2019	1	0
Finland	2020	3	0
Finland	2021	8	0
Total		12	0

== Honours ==
HJK

- Veikkausliiga: 2023

Individual

- Football Association of Finland Promising player of the year: 2015
