= Jesse Öst =

Finnish footballer (born 1990)

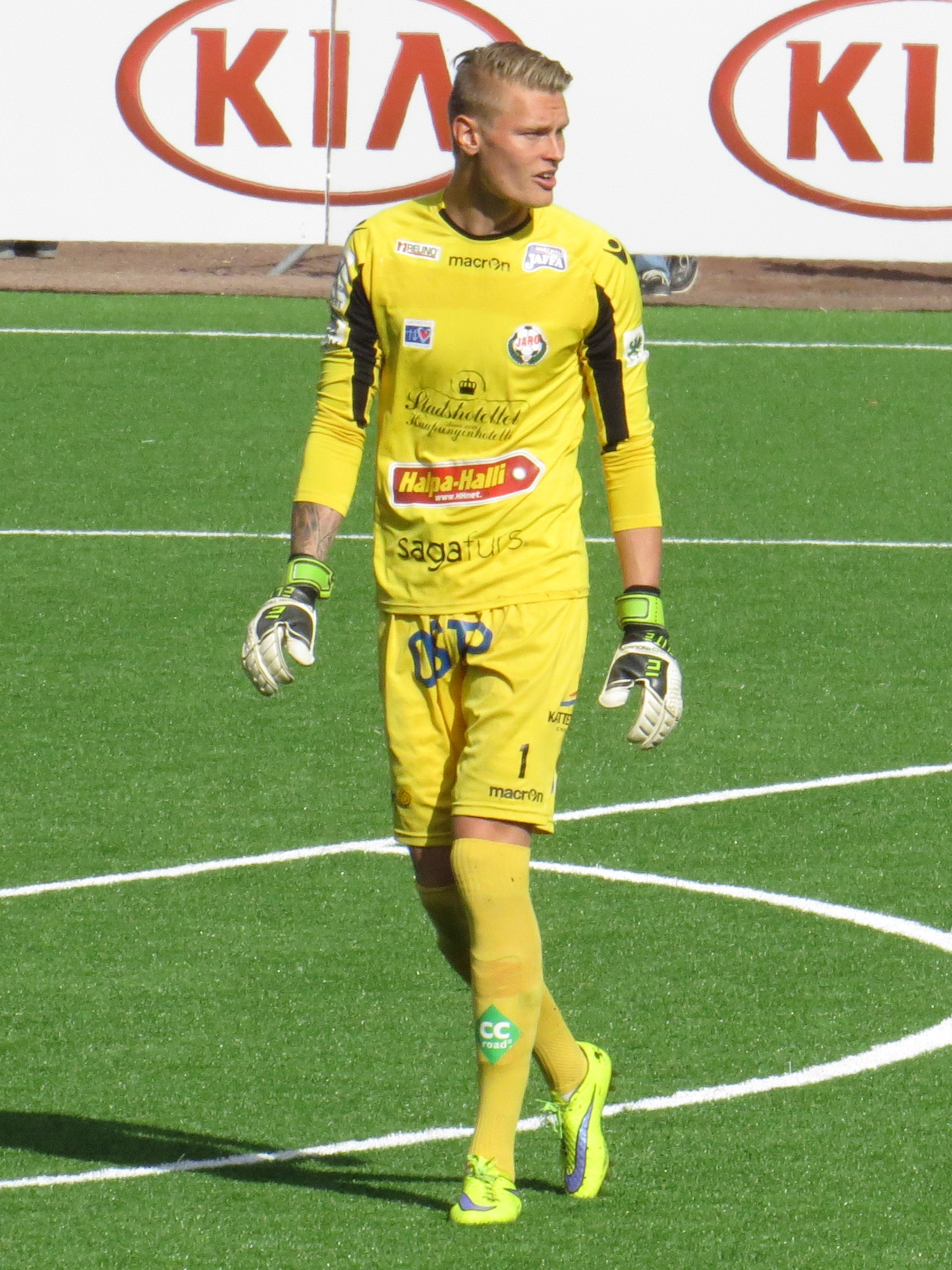
- Öst with Jaro in 2015.

Personal information
- Full name: Jesse Otto Öst
- Date of birth: 20 October 1990 (age 36)
- Place of birth: Jakobstad, Finland
- Height: 1.92 m (6 ft 4 in)
- Position: Goalkeeper

Team information
- Current team: HJK
- Number: 1

Senior career*
Years	Team	Apps	(Gls)
2010–2015	Jaro	100	(0)
2011–2015	→ JBK	11	(0)
2016–2017	Degerfors	49	(0)
2018–2022	SJK	85	(0)
2018–2019	→ SJK II	3	(0)
2023–	HJK	43	(0)

International career
2012	Finland U21		
- * Club domestic league appearances and goals as of 12 November 2026

Jesse Otto Öst (born 20 October 1990) is a Finnish professional footballer who plays as a goalkeeper for Veikkausliiga club HJK.

== Club career ==
Öst was born in Pietarsaari, and started playing football in his hometown club FF Jaro.

On 19 December 2015, Öst signed with Swedish club Degerfors IF on a two-year deal. On 7 March 2016, in a Svenska Cupen match against IK Frej, Öst scored a goal for his team.

After two seasons in Sweden, Öst spent five seasons in Seinäjoki with SJK, before leaving the club after the 2022 Veikkausliiga season.

Öst signed with Finnish champions HJK Helsinki on 4 November 2022, on a deal for the 2023 season, with an option for an additional year. On 5 November 2023, the club exercised their option and his contract was extended for the 2024 season. On 9 August 2024, he signed a two-year extension.

== International career ==
Öst has represented Finland at under-21 level and was once on the bench for the senior team in a 4–2 loss to Mexico in October 2013.

== Personal life ==
Öst is a Swedish-speaking Finn.

== Career statistics ==
As of 12 November 2026

Appearances and goals by club, season and competition
Club	Season	League			Cup (Note: Includes Suomen Cup and Svenska Cupen)		League cup (Note: Includes Finnish League Cup)		Continental		Total	
Club	Season	Division	Apps	Goals	Apps	Goals	Apps	Goals	Apps	Goals	Apps	Goals
JBK	2011	Kakkonen	10	0	–		–		–		10	0
JBK	2015	Kakkonen	1	0	–		–		–		1	0
JBK	Total		11	0	0	0	0	0	0	0	11	0
Jaro	2011	Veikkausliiga	8	0	–		–		–		8	0
Jaro	2012	Veikkausliiga	8	0	2	0	2	0	–		12	0
Jaro	2013	Veikkausliiga	32	0	1	0	5	0	–		38	0
Jaro	2014	Veikkausliiga	24	0	0	0	4	0	–		28	0
Jaro	2015	Veikkausliiga	28	0	1	0	2	0	–		31	0
Jaro	Total		100	0	4	0	13	0	0	0	117	0
Degerfors	2016	Superettan	25	0	3	1	–		–		28	1
Degerfors	2017	Superettan	24	0	0	0	–		–		24	0
Degerfors	Total		49	0	3	1	0	0	0	0	52	1
SJK Akatemia	2018	Kakkonen	2	0	–		–		–		2	0
SJK Akatemia	2019	Kakkonen	1	0	–		–		–		1	0
SJK Akatemia	Total		3	0	0	0	0	0	0	0	3	0
SJK	2018	Veikkausliiga	16	0	0	0	–		–		16	0
SJK	2019	Veikkausliiga	12	0	3	0	–		–		15	0
SJK	2020	Veikkausliiga	14	0	4	0	–		–		18	0
SJK	2021	Veikkausliiga	27	0	2	0	–		–		29	0
SJK	2022	Veikkausliiga	16	0	1	0	1	0	3 (Note: Includes UEFA Europa Conference League)	0	21	0
SJK	Total		75	0	10	0	1	0	3	0	89	0
HJK Helsinki	2023	Veikkausliiga	15	0	1	0	5	0	8 (Note: Includes UEFA Champions League, UEFA Europa League and UEFA Europa Conference League)	0	29	0
HJK Helsinki	2024	Veikkausliiga	18	0	0	0	1	0	1 (Note: Appearances in UEFA Champions League)	0	20	0
HJK Helsinki	2025	Veikkausliiga	1	0	2	0	4	0	–		7	0
HJK Helsinki	2026	Veikkausliiga	9	0	3	0	4	0	1	0	17	0
HJK Helsinki	Total		43	0	6	0	14	0	10	0	53	0
Career total			281	0	23	1	28	0	13	0	345	1

== Honours ==
=== HJK ===
- Veikkausliiga: 2023
- Finnish Cup: 2025
- Finnish League Cup: 2023

=== SJK ===
- Veikkausliiga: 2021 3rd place
