= Tuomas Ollila =

Finnish footballer (born 2000)

Personal information
- Date of birth: 25 April 2000 (age 26)
- Place of birth: Helsinki, Finland
- Height: 1.75 m (5 ft 9 in)
- Position: Left back

Team information
- Current team: Guingamp

Youth career
- 2004–2010: HPS
- 2010–2016: KäPa
- 2017–2018: HJK

Senior career*
Years	Team	Apps	(Gls)
2017–2018	Klubi 04	19	(0)
2019–2020	KTP	33	(3)
2021–2022	Ilves	42	(10)
2023	HJK	24	(7)
2024–2026	Paris FC	44	(2)
2026–	Guingamp	0	(0)

International career^{‡}
2016	Finland U16	2	(0)
2017	Finland U17	5	(1)
2018	Finland U18	2	(0)
2022–	Finland	5	(0)
- * Club domestic league appearances and goals as of 19 May 2026 ‡ National team caps and goals as of 21 March 2025

Tuomas Ollila (born 25 April 2000) is a Finnish professional footballer who plays as a left-back for Ligue 2 club Guingamp and the Finland national team.

== Early career ==
Born in Helsinki, Ollila was raised in Paloheinä and Pakila neighbourhoods. He started playing football in a youth program of Helsingin Palloseura (HPS) when aged four. He played in the youth sector of Käpylän Pallo (KäPa) since aged nine, and HJK Helsinki since 2017. During the 2018 season, Ollila made his senior debut with Klubi 04, the reserve team of HJK, playing in the second-tier Ykkönen. Ollila also represented HJK Youth in the 2018–19 UEFA Youth League.

== Club career ==
=== KTP ===
In January 2019, Ollila joined Kotkan Työväen Palloilijat (KTP) in Ykkönen, and spent two seasons in Kotka, ultimately winning a promotion to Veikkausliiga with the club after the 2020 season.

=== Ilves ===
On 1 January 2021, he moved to Ilves in premier division Veikkausliiga on a free transfer, after his contract with KTP had expired. During two seasons with Ilves, Ollila made 50 appearances in all competitions combined, scoring 10 goals.

=== HJK Helsinki ===
Ollila transferred from Ilves back to his former youth club HJK Helsinki on 3 January 2023 on a two-year deal. He made his debut and scored his first goal on 27 January in a 3–0 League cup win against IFK Mariehamn.

=== Paris FC ===
On 29 January 2024, Ollila signed with French club Paris FC in Ligue 2, on a deal until June 2027, for an undisclosed transfer fee, rumoured to be €400,000. On 10 March 2024 in his second appearance, Ollila scored his first goal for his new club, a winning goal in a 1–0 away win against Caen. On 29 October 2025, he made his Ligue 1 debut in a match against Lyon.

=== Guingamp ===
On 27 August 2026, Ollilia joined Ligue 2 club Guingamp on a one-year contract, with an option for a second year.

== International career ==
Ollila received his first call-up to Finland senior national team in November 2022, for friendly matches against Norway and North Macedonia. He made his debut against North Macedonia on 17 November.

== Personal life ==
Ollila has two brothers who are also football players, the elder Juuso Ollila and his twin Akseli Ollila, both of whom play for MPS/Atletico Malmi. Growing up, he also played ice hockey with HIFK, before choosing football over it when aged 13.

== Career statistics ==
=== Club ===
As of 19 May 2026

Club	Season	League			National cup (Note: Includes Finnish Cup and Coupe de France)		League cup (Note: Includes Finnish League Cup)		Europe		Other		Total	
Club	Season	Division	Apps	Goals	Apps	Goals	Apps	Goals	Apps	Goals	Apps	Goals	Apps	Goals
Klubi 04	2018	Ykkönen	19	0	2	0	—		—		—		21	0
KTP	2019	Ykkönen	21	0	5	0	—		—		—		26	0
KTP	2020	Ykkönen	12	2	5	0	—		—		—		17	2
KTP	Total		33	2	10	0	0	0	0	0	0	0	43	2
Ilves	2021	Veikkausliiga	16	4	3	0	—		—		—		19	4
Ilves	2022	Veikkausliiga	26	6	1	0	4	0	—		–		31	6
Ilves	Total		42	10	4	0	4	0	0	0	0	0	50	10
Ilves II	2021	Kakkonen	1	0	—		—		—		—		1	0
HJK	2023	Veikkausliiga	24	7	1	0	5	2	9 (Note: Includes UEFA Champions League, UEFA Europa League and UEFA Europa Conference League)	1	–		39	10
Paris FC	2023–24	Ligue 2	12	2	0	0	—		—		1 (Note: Appearance in the Ligue 1 promotion play-offs)	0	13	2
Paris FC	2024–25	Ligue 2	22	0	0	0	—		—		—		22	0
Paris FC	2025–26	Ligue 1	10	0	2	0	—		—		—		12	0
Paris FC	Total		44	2	2	0	0	0	0	0	1	0	47	2
Career total			163	21	19	0	9	2	9	1	1	0	201	24

=== International ===
As of match played 21 March 2025

Appearances and goals by national team and year
National team	Year	Apps	Goals
Finland
Finland	2022	1	0
Finland	2023	1	0
Finland	2024	2	0
Finland	2025	1	0
Total		5	0

== Honours ==
Paris FC

- Ligue 2 runner-up: 2024–25

HJK

- Veikkausliiga: 2023
- Finnish League Cup: 2023

KTP

- Ykkönen runner-up: 2020

Individual

- Veikkausliiga Team of the Year: 2023
- Veikkausliiga Defender of the Year: 2023
