= Christian Tue Jensen =

Danish footballer (born 2000)

Personal information
- Date of birth: 9 March 2000 (age 26)
- Place of birth: Denmark
- Height: 1.77 m (5 ft 10 in)
- Positions: Attacking midfielder; winger

Team information
- Current team: HB Køge
- Number: 10

Youth career
- 2013–2020: Midtjylland
- 2019–2020: → Brentford (loan)

Senior career*
Years	Team	Apps	(Gls)
2020–2022	Midtjylland	0	(0)
2020–2021	→ Fredericia (loan)	28	(10)
2021–2022	→ Fredericia (loan)	25	(3)
2022–2023	KuPS	8	(0)
2022–2023	→ KuPS II	6	(3)
2023–	HB Køge	81	(13)

International career
2015–2016	Denmark U16	8	(4)
2016–2017	Denmark U17	13	(6)
2017–2018	Denmark U18	6	(2)
2018	Denmark U19	4	(0)
- * Club domestic league appearances and goals as of 11:56, 27 July 2026 (UTC)

Christian Tue Jensen (born 9 March 2000) is a Danish professional footballer who plays as an attacking midfielder for HB Køge.

Jensen is a product of the FC Midtjylland academy and played his first senior football on loan at FC Fredericia. He transferred to Finnish club KuPS in 2022, but following an abortive spell, he returned to Denmark with HB Køge in 2023. Capped by Denmark at youth level, Jensen has been described as "a forward capable of waspish delivery with his right foot".

== Club career ==
=== FC Midtjylland and loans ===
An attacking midfielder or winger, Jensen began his career in the academy at Superliga club FC Midtjylland at age 13. He signed his first professional contract in January 2017 and signed a new five-year contract in June 2018. On 21 June 2019, Jensen moved to England to join the B team at Championship club Brentford on loan for the duration of the 2019–20 season. He was deployed as a forward.

On 11 August 2020, Jensen joined Danish 1st Division club FC Fredericia on loan for the duration of the 2020–21 season. He top-scored with 10 goals in 29 appearances to help the team to a fifth-place finish in the 1st Division's promotion group. In June 2021, Jensen rejoined FC Fredericia on loan for the 2021–22 season and scored three goals in 29 appearances during a campaign in which the club repeated its finish from the previous season. Jensen transferred away from FC Midtjylland in July 2022.

=== KuPS ===
On 4 July 2022, Jensen transferred to Veikkausliiga club KuPS and signed an 18-month contract, with the option of a further year. He became eligible to play on 13 July 2022 and made seven appearances during the remainder of the 2022 season. Jensen was a part of the club's 2022 Finnish Cup-winning squad. After making just four league appearances during the first three months of the 2023 season, Jensen's "chaotic" spell with the club was ended when his contract was terminated by mutual consent on 1 July 2023.

=== HB Køge ===
Following an unsuccessful trial with AC Horsens, Jensen signed a two-year contract with Danish 1st Division club HB Køge on a free transfer on 1 September 2023. He made 27 appearances and scored two goals during a 2023–24 season in which the club narrowly avoided relegation. Jensen made 22 appearances and scored five goals during the 2024–25 season, which again ended with the club narrowly avoiding relegation. He signed a new 18-month contract on 7 January 2025. Jensen made 28 appearances and scored seven goals during the 2025–26 season, in which the club narrowly avoided relegation for the third straight season.

== International career ==
Jensen won 31 caps and scored 12 goals for Denmark at youth level.

== Career statistics ==
As of match played 25 July 2026

Appearances and goals by club, season and competition
Club	Season	League			National cup (Note: Includes Danish Cup, Finnish Cup)		League cup (Note: Includes Finnish League Cup)		Europe		Total	
Club	Season	Division	Apps	Goals	Apps	Goals	Apps	Goals	Apps	Goals	Apps	Goals
FC Midtjylland	2020–21	Danish Superliga	0	0	0	0	―		0	0	0	0
FC Midtjylland	2021–22	Danish Superliga	0	0	0	0	―		0	0	0	0
FC Midtjylland	Total		0	0	0	0	―		0	0	0	0
FC Fredericia (loan)	2020–21	Danish 1st Division	28	10	1	0	―		―		29	10
FC Fredericia (loan)	2021–22	Danish 1st Division	25	3	4	0	―		―		29	3
FC Fredericia (loan)	Total		53	13	5	0	―		―		58	13
KuPS	2022	Veikkausliiga	4	0	0	0	―		3 (Note: Appearances in Europa Conference League)	0	7	0
KuPS	2023	Veikkausliiga	4	0	0	0	6	2	―		10	2
KuPS	Total		8	0	0	0	6	2	3	0	17	2
KuPS Akatemia	2022	Kakkonen	4	1	―		―		―		4	1
KuPS Akatemia	2023	Kakkonen	2	2	―		―		―		2	2
KuPS Akatemia	Total		6	3	―		―		―		6	3
HB Køge	2023–24	Danish 1st Division	25	2	2	0	―		―		27	2
HB Køge	2024–25	Danish 1st Division	29	4	3	1	―		―		32	5
HB Køge	2025–26	Danish 1st Division	27	7	1	0	―		―		28	7
HB Køge	2026–27	Danish 1st Division	0	0	0	0	―		―		0	0
HB Køge	Total		81	13	6	1	―		―		87	14
Career total			148	29	11	1	6	2	3	0	168	32

== Honours ==
KuPS

- Finnish Cup: 2022
