= Kai Meriluoto =

Finnish footballer (born 2003)

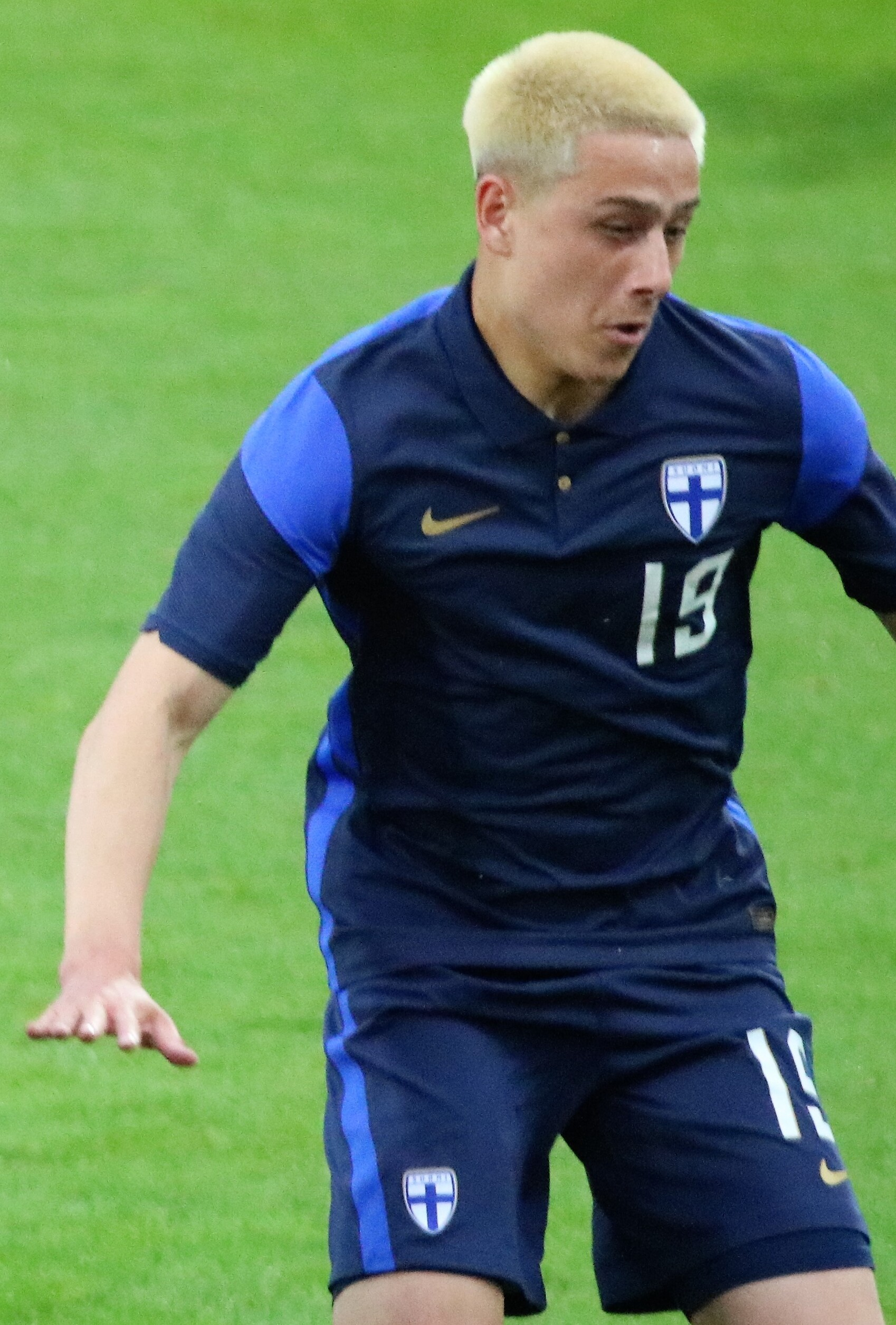
- Meriluoto with Finland U21 in 2022

Personal information
- Date of birth: 2 January 2003 (age 23)
- Place of birth: Siuntio, Finland
- Height: 1.83 m (6 ft 0 in)
- Position: Forward

Team information
- Current team: IFK Värnamo
- Number: 9

Youth career
- KyIF
- HJK

Senior career*
Years	Team	Apps	(Gls)
2019–2024	Klubi 04	52	(29)
2020–2025	HJK	27	(7)
2022	→ Ilves (loan)	25	(10)
2023–2024	→ Stal Mielec (loan)	23	(2)
2025	→ Maribor (loan)	13	(4)
2025–	IFK Värnamo	42	(12)

International career^{‡}
2018–2019	Finland U16	5	(2)
2019–2020	Finland U17	11	(5)
2021	Finland U19	7	(1)
2021	Finland U20	1	(1)
2022–2024	Finland U21	15	(2)
2023–	Finland	2	(0)
- * Club domestic league appearances and goals as of 12 November 2026 ‡ National team caps and goals as of 9 June 2024

Kai Meriluoto (born 2 January 2003) is a Finnish professional footballer who plays as a forward for Superettan club IFK Värnamo.

== Early life ==
Meriluoto was born in Pori, Finland, to a Japanese Catholic mother from Hakodate, Hokkaido, and to a Finnish father. His parents met in 1989 when they both were studying in Wisconsin, US. When he was a one-year-old, he moved to Vienne, Isère, France, with his family and lived there for five years before returning to Finland. Meriluoto lived in Shanghai, China, due to his father's work from when he was ten years old until he was twelve years old. He has dual citizenship of Finland and Japan, and he speaks Finnish, Japanese, French and English fluently. Meriluoto has an older brother, Aki, who is also a footballer and has played for US Lesquin at the semi-pro level in France.

== Club career ==
=== Ilves (loan) ===
On 15 February 2022, Meriluoto joined Veikkausliiga club Ilves on loan for the 2022 season. He finished his first full season in the league scoring ten goals for the team. After the season, he returned to HJK.

==== Return to HJK ====
In April 2023, he extended his contract with HJK until the end of 2025.

=== Stal Mielec (loan) ===
On 14 July 2023, Meriluoto joined Polish Ekstraklasa side Stal Mielec on a season-long loan, with an option to make the move permanent. He scored his first Ekstraklasa goal on 18 September 2023, a header in a 4–2 home win against Zagłębie Lubin. On 9 December 2023, in a match against Cracovia, Meriluoto made a crucial impact after coming in from the bench, when his team was in a 2–0 losing position. He first scored the 2–1 goal on the 86th minute, and one minute later provided an assist to the equalizer. The game eventually ended in a 2–2 draw. During his loan stint, Meriluoto was mainly used as a late substitute, starting only two of his 23 Ekstraklasa appearances.

==== Return to HJK ====
After the 2023–24 season, he returned to HJK. On 13 December 2024, Meriluoto scored a decisive over-time goal for HJK, in a UEFA Conference League league phase match against Molde, securing his side a point in a 2–2 draw.

=== Maribor (loan) ===
On 15 February 2025, Meriluoto joined Slovenian PrvaLiga club Maribor on loan for the remainder of the 2024–25 season, with a deal including an option to buy. On 22 April, Meriluoto scored his first goals for Maribor by a brace, including a winning goal in a 2–1 win over Mura.

=== IFK Värnamo ===
On 8 August 2025, Meriluoto signed with Allsvenskan club IFK Värnamo until the end of 2028 for an undisclosed fee. Three days later he scored in his Allsvenskan debut, in a 2–2 away draw against IF Elfsborg. On 14 September, Meriluoto scored a hat-trick against Öster.

== Personal life ==
Meriluoto is a religious person. He is a teetotaller and has never drunk alcohol.

== Career statistics ==
=== Club ===
As of 10 September 2026

Club	Season	League			National cup (Note: Includes Suomen Cup, Polish Cup and Slovenian Cup)		League cup		Europe		Total	
Club	Season	Division	Apps	Goals	Apps	Goals	Apps	Goals	Apps	Goals	Apps	Goals
Klubi 04	2019	Kakkonen	12	7	1	2	—		—		13	9
Klubi 04	2020	Kakkonen	15	14	1	0	—		—		16	14
Klubi 04	2021	Ykkönen	24	7	3	1	—		—		27	8
Klubi 04	2024	Ykkönen	1	1	—		—		—		1	1
Klubi 04	Total		52	29	5	3	0	0	0	0	57	32
HJK	2020	Veikkausliiga	3	1	0	0	—		—		3	1
HJK	2021	Veikkausliiga	0	0	0	0	—		0	0	0	0
HJK	2022	Veikkausliiga	0	0	0	0	0	0	0	0	0	0
HJK	2023	Veikkausliiga	14	2	1	1	5	2	0	0	20	5
HJK	2024	Veikkausliiga	7	2	0	0	0	0	7 (Note: Includes UEFA Champions League and UEFA Conference League)	1	14	3
HJK	2025	Veikkausliiga	3	2	0	0	2	0	4 (Note: Appearances in UEFA Conference League)	1	9	3
HJK	Total		27	7	1	1	7	2	11	2	46	12
Ilves (loan)	2022	Veikkausliiga	25	10	1	0	3	2	—		29	12
Stal Mielec (loan)	2023–24	Ekstraklasa	23	2	3	1	—		—		26	3
Maribor (loan)	2024–25	Slovenian PrvaLiga	13	4	2	0	—		—		15	4
IFK Värnamo	2025	Allsvenskan	12	4	1	0	—		—		13	4
IFK Värnamo	2026	Superettan	23	7	3	3	—		—		26	10
IFK Värnamo	Total		35	11	4	3	0	0	0	0	39	14
Career total			175	62	16	8	10	4	11	2	213	75

=== International ===
As of match played on 12 January 2023.

National team	Year	Competitive		Friendly		Total	
National team	Year	Apps	Goals	Apps	Goals	Apps	Goals
Finland	2023	0	0	2	0	2	0
Total		0	0	2	0	2	0

== Honours ==
HJK

- Veikkausliiga: 2020, 2023
- Finnish Cup: 2020
- Finnish League Cup: 2023

Klubi 04

- Kakkonen Group B: 2020
