= Daniel Koskipalo =

Finnish footballer (born 2003)

Personal information
- Date of birth: 3 May 2003 (age 23)
- Place of birth: Hartola, Finland
- Height: 1.77 m (5 ft 10 in)
- Position: Right back

Team information
- Current team: Lahti
- Number: 3

Youth career
- –2020: Reipas Lahti
- 2021: Lahti

Senior career*
Years	Team	Apps	(Gls)
2021–	Reipas Lahti	44	(2)
2021–	Lahti	20	(0)
- * Club domestic league appearances and goals as of 22 January 2024

Daniel Koskipalo (born 3 May 2003) is a Finnish professional footballer who plays as a right back for Veikkausliiga side Lahti.

== Career ==
Koskipalo played in the youth sector of Reipas Lahti, and debuted in Veikkausliiga for FC Lahti first team on 16 October 2021, in a draw against FC Haka.

== International career ==
Koskipalo has attended training camps with Finland under-18 and under-19 youth national teams in Eerikkilä Sports Centre, but has not debuted at youth international level.
