= Halil Bağcı =

Turkish footballer (born 2003)

Personal information
- Date of birth: 4 April 2003 (age 23)
- Place of birth: Gaziantep, Turkey
- Height: 1.97 m (6 ft 6 in)
- Position: Goalkeeper

Youth career
- –2022: Ankaragücü

Senior career*
Years	Team	Apps	(Gls)
2022–2023	Klubi 04	8	(0)
2022–2023	HJK	0	(0)
2023	→ SalPa (loan)	13	(0)
2024–2026	Gaziantep	1	(0)
2025	→ Silifke Belediyespor (loan)	5	(0)
- * Club domestic league appearances and goals as of 19 March 2026

Halil Bağcı (born 4 April 2003) is a Turkish professional footballer who plays as a goalkeeper.

== Club career ==
Born in Gaziantep, Bağcı is a product of the Ankaragücü youth sector.

On 2 May 2022, Finnish side HJK announced that they had acquired Bağcı on a one-year deal with an option for two more years.

On 9 December 2022, Bağcı signed a loan deal with a newly promoted Ykkönen club SalPa for the 2023 season.

On 22 January 2024, Bağcı returned to Turkey and signed with Süper Lig club Gaziantep on a two-and-a-half-year deal.

== Career statistics ==
As of 16 June 2025

Appearances and goals by club, season and competition
Club	Season	League			National cup (Note: Includes Suomen Cup and Turkish Cup)		Continental		Other		Total	
Club	Season	Division	Apps	Goals	Apps	Goals	Apps	Goals	Apps	Goals	Apps	Goals
HJK	2022	Veikkausliiga	0	0	0	0	0	0	0	0	0	0
Klubi 04	2022	Kakkonen	8	0	0	0	—		—		8	0
SalPa (loan)	2023	Ykkönen	13	0	2	0	—		2 (Note: Includes Ykköscup)	0	17	0
Gaziantep	2023–24	Süper Lig	0	0	0	0	—		—		0	0
Gaziantep	2024–25	Süper Lig	1	0	1	0	—		—		2	0
Gaziantep	Total		1	0	1	0	0	0	0	0	2	0
Silifke Belediyespor (loan)	2025–26	TFF 3. Lig	0	0	0	0	—		—		0	0
Career total			22	0	3	0	0	0	2	0	27	0
