= Aleksi Paananen =

Finnish footballer (born 1993)

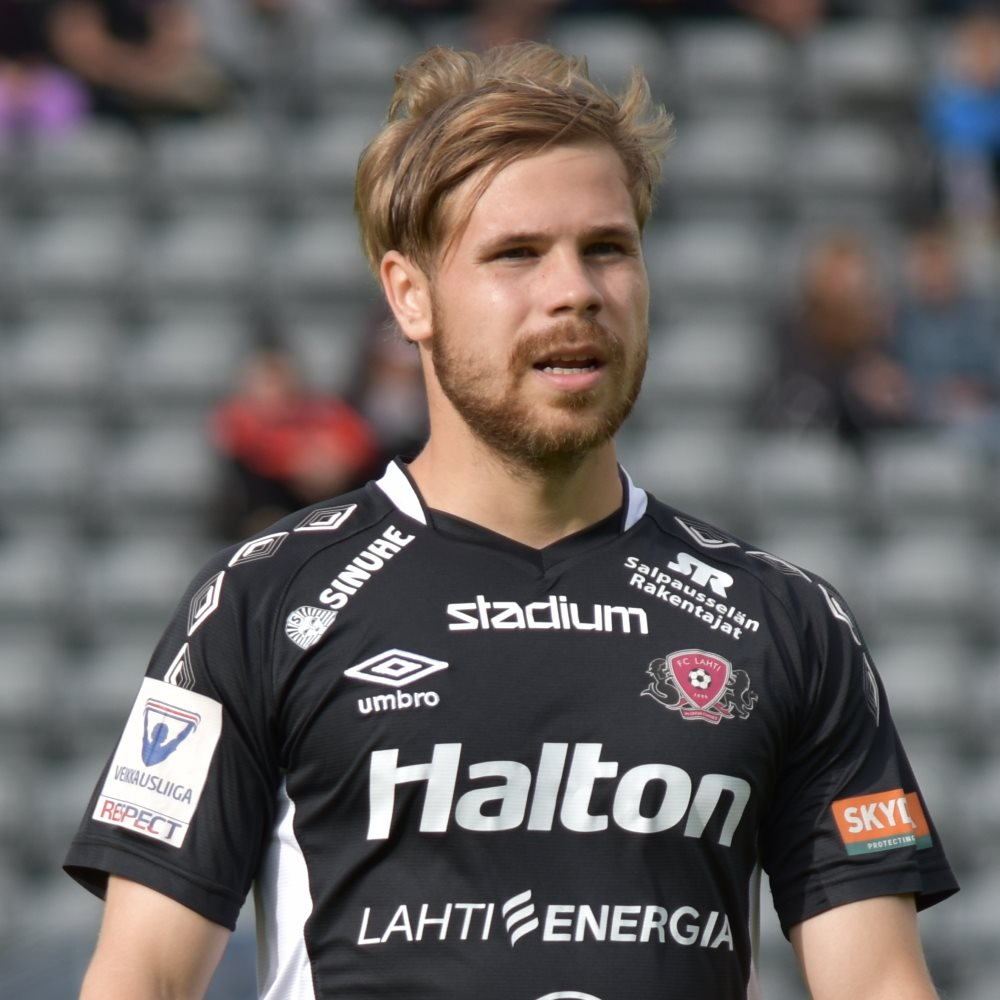
- Paananen with Lahti in 2017

Personal information
- Date of birth: 25 January 1993 (age 33)
- Place of birth: Siilinjärvi, Finland
- Height: 1.69 m (5 ft 6 1/2 in)
- Position: Midfielder

Team information
- Current team: AC Oulu
- Number: 19

Youth career
- SiPS
- KuPS

Senior career*
Years	Team	Apps	(Gls)
2010–2014	KuPS	110	(9)
2011	→ PK-37 (loan)	3	(2)
2015–2018	Lahti	118	(4)
2019–2022	Inter Turku	83	(9)
2023	HJK	14	(1)
2024–	AC Oulu	37	(0)

International career
	Finland U16	4	(1)
2009–2010	Finland U17	15	(3)
2010–2011	Finland U18	4	(2)
2011	Finland U19	4	(0)
2013	Finland U20	2	(1)
2012–2013	Finland U21	13	(0)
- * Club domestic league appearances and goals as of 20 November 2025

Aleksi Paananen (born 25 January 1993) is a Finnish professional footballer who plays as a midfielder for Veikkausliiga club AC Oulu. He is often labeled as Thiago Alcantara or Diego Maradona of Finnish football, of which the latter he got the nickname ”Diego”.

== Career ==
=== KuPS ===
Paananen started football with SiPS youth sector, before moving to KuPS in the nearby town of Kuopio. He made his senior debut with the KuPS first team in Veikkausliiga in 2010.

=== Inter Turku ===
On 1 November 2018, Inter Turku announced the signing of Paananen for the 2019 season. He signed a 2-year deal.

=== HJK ===
On 2 November 2022, Paananen signed a contract with HJK for the 2023 season, with an option for 2024.

On 5 November 2023, it was announced that Paananen will leave HJK after the season.

=== AC Oulu ===
In November 2023, it was announced that Paananen had signed with fellow Veikkausliiga side AC Oulu on a two-year deal with an option for an additional year, starting in 2024.

== Career statistics ==
As of 26 February 2025

Appearances and goals by club, season and competition
Club	Season	League			Cup		League cup		Europe		Total	
Club	Season	Division	Apps	Goals	Apps	Goals	Apps	Goals	Apps	Goals	Apps	Goals
KuPS	2010	Veikkausliiga	1	0	0	0	—		—		1	0
KuPS	2011	Veikkausliiga	20	2	0	0	—		1 (Note: Includes UEFA Europa League)	0	21	2
KuPS	2012	Veikkausliiga	23	2	5	0	4	0	5	3	37	5
KuPS	2013	Veikkausliiga	33	3	4	1	7	5	—		44	9
KuPS	2014	Veikkausliiga	33	2	3	2	4	1	—		40	5
KuPS	Total		110	9	12	3	15	6	6	3	143	21
PK-37 (loan)	2011	Kakkonen	3	2	—		—		—		3	2
SiPS (loan)	2012	Kolmonen	4	3	—		—		—		4	3
Lahti	2015	Veikkausliiga	27	0	2	0	4	0	2	0	36	0
Lahti	2016	Veikkausliiga	33	2	4	1	6	0	—		43	3
Lahti	2017	Veikkausliiga	29	0	4	0	—		—		33	0
Lahti	2018	Veikkausliiga	29	2	5	0	—		2	0	36	2
Lahti	Total		118	4	15	1	10	0	4	0	147	3
Inter Turku	2019	Veikkausliiga	20	1	7	0	—		2	0	29	1
Inter Turku	2020	Veikkausliiga	21	3	7	1	—		1	0	29	4
Inter Turku	2021	Veikkausliiga	23	2	4	1	–		1 (Note: Includes UEFA Europa Conference League)	0	28	3
Inter Turku	2022	Veikkausliiga	20	3	4	1	6	0	–		30	4
Inter Turku	Total		84	9	22	2	6	0	4	0	116	11
HJK	2023	Veikkausliiga	14	1	0	0	4	0	2	0	20	1
AC Oulu	2024	Veikkausliiga	15	0	2	0	2	0	–		19	0
AC Oulu	2025	Veikkausliiga	0	0	0	0	4	0	–		4	0
AC Oulu	Total		15	0	2	0	6	0	0	0	23	0
Career total			348	28	51	6	41	6	16	3	456	37

== Honours ==
KuPS

- Veikkausliiga runner-up: 2010
- Finnish Cup runner-up: 2011, 2012, 2013

Lahti

- Finnish League Cup: 2016

Inter Turku

- Veikkausliiga runner-up: 2019, 2020
- Finnish Cup runner-up: 2020, 2022
- Finnish League Cup runner-up: 2022

HJK

- Veikkausliiga: 2023
- Finnish League Cup: 2023
