= UEFA Euro 1980 squads =

These are the teams for the 1980 European Football Championship tournament in Italy, that took place between 11 June and 22 June 1980. The players' listed ages is their actual age on the tournament's opening day (11 June 1980).

== Group 1 ==
=== Czechoslovakia ===
Manager: Jozef Vengloš

No.	Pos.	Player	Date of birth (age)	Caps	Club
1	GK	Jaroslav Netolička	3 March 1954 (aged 26)	11	(Czechoslovakia) Dukla Prague
2	DF	Jozef Barmoš	28 August 1954 (aged 25)	28	(Czechoslovakia) Inter Bratislava
3	DF	Ladislav Jurkemik	20 July 1953 (aged 26)	31	(Czechoslovakia) Inter Bratislava
4	DF	Anton Ondruš (captain)	27 March 1950 (aged 30)	54	(Czechoslovakia) Slovan Bratislava
5	DF	Koloman Gögh	7 January 1948 (aged 32)	51	(Czechoslovakia) Slovan Bratislava
6	DF	František Štambachr	13 February 1953 (aged 27)	15	(Czechoslovakia) Dukla Prague
7	MF	Ján Kozák	17 April 1954 (aged 26)	34	(Czechoslovakia) Lokomotiva Košice
8	MF	Antonín Panenka	2 December 1948 (aged 31)	43	(Czechoslovakia) Bohemians Prague
9	FW	Miroslav Gajdůšek	20 September 1951 (aged 28)	45	(Czechoslovakia) Dukla Prague
10	FW	Marián Masný	13 August 1950 (aged 29)	57	(Czechoslovakia) Slovan Bratislava
11	FW	Zdeněk Nehoda	9 May 1952 (aged 28)	64	(Czechoslovakia) Dukla Prague
12	DF	Rostislav Vojáček	23 February 1949 (aged 31)	24	(Czechoslovakia) Baník Ostrava
13	MF	Werner Lička	15 February 1954 (aged 26)	2	(Czechoslovakia) Baník Ostrava
14	DF	Jan Fiala	19 May 1956 (aged 24)	12	(Czechoslovakia) Dukla Prague
15	FW	Ladislav Vízek	22 January 1955 (aged 25)	15	(Czechoslovakia) Dukla Prague
16	DF	Oldřich Rott	26 May 1951 (aged 29)	3	(Czechoslovakia) Dukla Prague
17	MF	Jaroslav Pollák	11 July 1947 (aged 32)	49	(Czechoslovakia) Sparta Prague
18	MF	Jan Berger	27 November 1955 (aged 24)	1	(Czechoslovakia) Dukla Prague
19	DF	Karol Dobiaš	18 December 1947 (aged 32)	67	(Czechoslovakia) Bohemians Prague
20	MF	Petr Němec	7 June 1957 (aged 23)	0	(Czechoslovakia) Baník Ostrava
21	GK	Stanislav Seman	8 August 1952 (aged 27)	1	(Czechoslovakia) Lokomotiva Košice
22	GK	Dušan Kéketi	24 March 1951 (aged 29)	7	(Czechoslovakia) Spartak Trnava

=== Greece ===
Manager: Alketas Panagoulias

No.	Pos.	Player	Date of birth (age)	Caps	Club
1	GK	Vasilis Konstantinou	19 November 1947 (aged 32)	23	(Greece) Panathinaikos
2	DF	Ioannis Kyrastas	25 October 1952 (aged 27)	32	(Greece) Olympiacos
3	DF	Konstantinos Iosifidis	14 January 1952 (aged 28)	35	(Greece) PAOK
4	DF	Anthimos Kapsis	3 September 1950 (aged 29)	21	(Greece) Panathinaikos
5	DF	Giorgos Foiros	8 November 1953 (aged 26)	37	(Greece) Aris
6	MF	Spiros Livathinos	8 January 1955 (aged 25)	8	(Greece) Panathinaikos
7	MF	Christos Terzanidis	13 February 1945 (aged 35)	25	(Greece) Panathinaikos
8	MF	Takis Nikoloudis	26 August 1951 (aged 28)	21	(Greece) Olympiacos
9	FW	Christos Ardizoglou	25 May 1953 (aged 27)	21	(Greece) AEK Athens
10	FW	Maik Galakos	23 November 1951 (aged 28)	23	(Greece) Olympiacos
11	MF	Ioannis Damanakis	2 October 1952 (aged 27)	18	(Greece) PAOK
12	DF	Ioannis Gounaris	6 July 1952 (aged 27)	12	(Greece) PAOK
13	MF	Charalambos Xanthopoulos	29 August 1956 (aged 23)	12	(Greece) Iraklis
14	MF	Giorgos Koudas (captain)	23 November 1946 (aged 33)	36	(Greece) PAOK
15	FW	Thomas Mavros	31 March 1954 (aged 26)	22	(Greece) AEK Athens
16	MF	Dinos Kouis	5 June 1955 (aged 25)	4	(Greece) Aris
17	DF	Petros Ravousis	1 October 1954 (aged 25)	19	(Greece) AEK Athens
18	DF	Lakis Nikolaou	17 July 1949 (aged 30)	14	(Greece) AEK Athens
19	FW	Giorgos Kostikos	26 April 1958 (aged 22)	7	(Greece) PAOK
20	FW	Nikos Anastopoulos	22 January 1958 (aged 22)	6	(Greece) Panionios
21	GK	Eleftherios Poupakis	28 December 1946 (aged 33)	4	(Greece) OFI
22	GK	Stelios Papafloratos	27 January 1954 (aged 26)	2	(Greece) Aris

=== Netherlands ===
Manager: Jan Zwartkruis

No.	Pos.	Player	Date of birth (age)	Caps	Club
1	GK	Piet Schrijvers	15 December 1946 (aged 33)	32	(Netherlands) Ajax
2	DF	Ben Wijnstekers	31 August 1955 (aged 24)	4	(Netherlands) Feyenoord
3	DF	Michel van de Korput	18 September 1956 (aged 23)	3	(Netherlands) Feyenoord
4	DF	Hugo Hovenkamp	5 October 1950 (aged 29)	18	(Netherlands) AZ
5	DF	Ruud Krol (captain)	24 March 1949 (aged 31)	72	(Canada) Vancouver Whitecaps
6	DF	Jan Poortvliet	21 September 1955 (aged 24)	15	(Netherlands) PSV Eindhoven
7	FW	René van de Kerkhof	16 September 1951 (aged 28)	36	(Netherlands) PSV Eindhoven
8	MF	Willy van de Kerkhof	16 September 1951 (aged 28)	36	(Netherlands) PSV Eindhoven
9	FW	Kees Kist	7 August 1952 (aged 27)	16	(Netherlands) AZ
10	MF	Arie Haan	16 November 1948 (aged 31)	32	(Belgium) Anderlecht
11	MF	Heini Otto	24 August 1954 (aged 25)	1	(Netherlands) Twente
12	FW	Johnny Rep	25 November 1951 (aged 28)	35	(France) Saint-Étienne
13	FW	Dick Nanninga	17 January 1949 (aged 31)	11	(Netherlands) Roda JC
14	FW	Adrie Koster	18 November 1954 (aged 25)	3	(Netherlands) PSV Eindhoven
15	DF	Huub Stevens	29 November 1953 (aged 26)	10	(Netherlands) PSV Eindhoven
16	GK	Pim Doesburg	28 October 1943 (aged 36)	3	(Netherlands) Sparta Rotterdam
17	FW	Martien Vreijsen	15 November 1955 (aged 24)	0	(Netherlands) NAC Breda
18	MF	Frans Thijssen	23 January 1952 (aged 28)	7	(England) Ipswich Town
19	DF	Romeo Zondervan	3 March 1959 (aged 21)	0	(Netherlands) Twente
20	GK	Hans van Breukelen	4 October 1956 (aged 23)	0	(Netherlands) Utrecht
21	DF	Ernie Brandts	3 February 1956 (aged 24)	17	(Netherlands) PSV Eindhoven
22	DF	John Metgod	27 February 1958 (aged 22)	7	(Netherlands) AZ

=== West Germany ===
Manager: Jupp Derwall

No.	Pos.	Player	Date of birth (age)	Caps	Club
1	GK	Harald Schumacher	6 March 1954 (aged 26)	3	(West Germany) 1. FC Köln
2	DF	Hans-Peter Briegel	11 October 1955 (aged 24)	4	(West Germany) 1. FC Kaiserslautern
3	DF	Bernhard Cullmann	1 November 1949 (aged 30)	37	(West Germany) 1. FC Köln
4	DF	Karlheinz Förster	25 July 1958 (aged 21)	13	(West Germany) VfB Stuttgart
5	DF	Bernard Dietz (captain)	22 March 1948 (aged 32)	42	(West Germany) MSV Duisburg
6	MF	Bernd Schuster	22 December 1959 (aged 20)	7	(West Germany) 1. FC Köln
7	DF	Bernd Förster	3 May 1956 (aged 24)	7	(West Germany) VfB Stuttgart
8	FW	Karl-Heinz Rummenigge	25 September 1955 (aged 24)	31	(West Germany) Bayern Munich
9	FW	Horst Hrubesch	17 April 1951 (aged 29)	2	(West Germany) Hamburger SV
10	MF	Hansi Müller	27 July 1957 (aged 22)	17	(West Germany) VfB Stuttgart
11	FW	Klaus Allofs	5 December 1956 (aged 23)	11	(West Germany) Fortuna Düsseldorf
12	MF	Caspar Memering	1 June 1953 (aged 27)	2	(West Germany) Hamburger SV
13	MF	Rainer Bonhof	29 March 1952 (aged 28)	51	(Spain) Valencia
14	MF	Felix Magath	26 July 1953 (aged 26)	3	(West Germany) Hamburger SV
15	MF	Uli Stielike	15 November 1954 (aged 25)	10	(Spain) Real Madrid
16	DF	Herbert Zimmermann	1 July 1954 (aged 25)	14	(West Germany) 1. FC Köln
17	MF	Karl Del'Haye	18 August 1955 (aged 24)	1	(West Germany) Borussia Mönchengladbach
18	MF	Lothar Matthäus	21 March 1961 (aged 19)	0	(West Germany) Borussia Mönchengladbach
19	MF	Miroslav Votava	24 April 1956 (aged 24)	1	(West Germany) Borussia Dortmund
20	DF	Manfred Kaltz	6 January 1953 (aged 27)	36	(West Germany) Hamburger SV
21	GK	Walter Junghans	26 October 1958 (aged 21)	0	(West Germany) Bayern Munich
22	GK	Eike Immel	27 November 1960 (aged 19)	0	(West Germany) Borussia Dortmund

== Group 2 ==
=== Belgium ===
Manager: Guy Thys

No.	Pos.	Player	Date of birth (age)	Caps	Club
1	GK	Theo Custers	10 August 1950 (aged 29)	8	(Belgium) Royal Antwerp
2	DF	Eric Gerets	18 May 1954 (aged 26)	23	(Belgium) Standard Liège
3	DF	Luc Millecamps	10 September 1951 (aged 28)	9	(Belgium) Waregem
4	DF	Walter Meeuws	11 July 1951 (aged 28)	20	(Belgium) Club Brugge
5	DF	Michel Renquin	3 November 1955 (aged 24)	21	(Belgium) Standard Liège
6	MF	Julien Cools (captain)	13 February 1947 (aged 33)	31	(Belgium) K. Beerschot
7	MF	René Vandereycken	22 July 1953 (aged 26)	21	(Belgium) Club Brugge
8	MF	Wilfried Van Moer	1 March 1945 (aged 35)	41	(Belgium) Beringen
9	FW	François Van der Elst	1 December 1954 (aged 25)	30	(Belgium) Anderlecht
10	FW	Erwin Vandenbergh	26 January 1959 (aged 21)	4	(Belgium) Lierse
11	MF	Jan Ceulemans	28 February 1957 (aged 23)	14	(Belgium) Club Brugge
12	GK	Jean-Marie Pfaff	4 December 1953 (aged 26)	14	(Belgium) Beveren
13	MF	Maurice Martens	5 June 1947 (aged 33)	22	(Belgium) Molenbeek
14	DF	Gerard Plessers	30 March 1959 (aged 21)	4	(Belgium) Standard Liège
15	MF	René Verheyen	20 March 1952 (aged 28)	13	(Belgium) Lokeren
16	MF	Marc Millecamps	9 October 1950 (aged 29)	1	(Belgium) Waregem
17	MF	Raymond Mommens	27 December 1958 (aged 21)	1	(Belgium) Lokeren
18	MF	Guy Dardenne	19 October 1954 (aged 25)	11	(Belgium) Lokeren
19	FW	Willy Wellens	29 March 1954 (aged 26)	6	(Belgium) Standard Liège
20	GK	Michel Preud'homme	24 January 1959 (aged 21)	1	(Belgium) Standard Liège
21	MF	Jos Heyligen	30 June 1947 (aged 32)	2	(Belgium) Beringen
22	FW	Ronny Martens	22 December 1958 (aged 21)	0	(Belgium) Anderlecht

=== England ===
Manager: Ron Greenwood

No.	Pos.	Player	Date of birth (age)	Caps	Club
1	GK	Ray Clemence	5 August 1948 (aged 31)	49	(England) Liverpool
2	DF	Phil Neal	20 February 1951 (aged 29)	25	(England) Liverpool
3	DF	Kenny Sansom	26 September 1958 (aged 21)	7	(England) Crystal Palace
4	DF	Phil Thompson	21 January 1954 (aged 26)	23	(England) Liverpool
5	DF	Dave Watson	5 October 1946 (aged 33)	52	(England) Southampton
6	MF	Ray Wilkins	14 September 1956 (aged 23)	32	(England) Manchester United
7	FW	Kevin Keegan (captain)	14 February 1951 (aged 29)	51	(West Germany) Hamburger SV
8	MF	Steve Coppell	9 July 1955 (aged 24)	23	(England) Manchester United
9	FW	David Johnson	23 October 1951 (aged 28)	7	(England) Liverpool
10	MF	Trevor Brooking	2 October 1948 (aged 31)	37	(England) West Ham United
11	FW	Tony Woodcock	6 December 1955 (aged 24)	10	(West Germany) 1. FC Köln
12	DF	Viv Anderson	29 July 1956 (aged 23)	3	(England) Nottingham Forest
13	GK	Peter Shilton	18 September 1949 (aged 30)	30	(England) Nottingham Forest
14	DF	Trevor Cherry	23 February 1948 (aged 32)	26	(England) Leeds United
15	DF	Emlyn Hughes	28 August 1947 (aged 32)	62	(England) Wolverhampton Wanderers
16	DF	Mick Mills	4 January 1949 (aged 31)	29	(England) Ipswich Town
17	MF	Terry McDermott	8 December 1951 (aged 28)	10	(England) Liverpool
18	MF	Ray Kennedy	28 July 1951 (aged 28)	15	(England) Liverpool
19	MF	Glenn Hoddle	27 October 1957 (aged 22)	3	(England) Tottenham Hotspur
20	FW	Paul Mariner	22 May 1953 (aged 27)	9	(England) Ipswich Town
21	FW	Garry Birtles	27 July 1956 (aged 23)	1	(England) Nottingham Forest
22	GK	Joe Corrigan	18 November 1948 (aged 31)	5	(England) Manchester City

=== Italy ===
Manager: Enzo Bearzot

No.	Pos.	Player	Date of birth (age)	Caps	Club
1	GK	Dino Zoff (captain)	28 February 1942 (aged 38)	80	(Italy) Juventus
2	DF	Franco Baresi	8 May 1960 (aged 20)	0	(Italy) Milan
3	DF	Giuseppe Baresi	7 February 1958 (aged 22)	1	(Italy) Internazionale
4	DF	Mauro Bellugi	7 February 1950 (aged 30)	32	(Italy) Napoli
5	DF	Antonio Cabrini	8 October 1957 (aged 22)	17	(Italy) Juventus
6	DF	Fulvio Collovati	9 May 1957 (aged 23)	8	(Italy) Milan
7	DF	Claudio Gentile	27 September 1953 (aged 26)	35	(Italy) Juventus
8	DF	Aldo Maldera	14 October 1953 (aged 26)	10	(Italy) Milan
9	DF	Gaetano Scirea	25 May 1953 (aged 27)	28	(Italy) Juventus
10	MF	Giancarlo Antognoni	1 April 1954 (aged 26)	43	(Italy) Fiorentina
11	MF	Romeo Benetti	20 October 1945 (aged 34)	51	(Italy) Roma
12	GK	Ivano Bordon	13 April 1951 (aged 29)	5	(Italy) Internazionale
13	MF	Ruben Buriani	16 March 1955 (aged 25)	2	(Italy) Milan
14	MF	Gabriele Oriali	25 November 1952 (aged 27)	9	(Italy) Internazionale
15	MF	Marco Tardelli	24 September 1954 (aged 25)	36	(Italy) Juventus
16	MF	Renato Zaccarelli	18 January 1951 (aged 29)	23	(Italy) Torino
17	FW	Alessandro Altobelli	28 November 1955 (aged 24)	0	(Italy) Internazionale
18	FW	Roberto Bettega	27 December 1950 (aged 29)	30	(Italy) Juventus
19	FW	Franco Causio	1 February 1949 (aged 31)	51	(Italy) Juventus
20	FW	Francesco Graziani	16 December 1952 (aged 27)	34	(Italy) Torino
21	FW	Roberto Pruzzo	1 April 1955 (aged 25)	1	(Italy) Roma
22	GK	Giovanni Galli	29 April 1958 (aged 22)	0	(Italy) Fiorentina

=== Spain ===
Manager: Ladislao Kubala

No.	Pos.	Player	Date of birth (age)	Caps	Club
1	GK	Luis Arconada	26 June 1954 (aged 25)	17	(Spain) Real Sociedad
2	DF	José Ramón Alexanko	19 May 1956 (aged 24)	10	(Spain) Athletic Bilbao
3	DF	Migueli	19 December 1951 (aged 28)	29	(Spain) Barcelona
4	MF	José Diego	21 November 1954 (aged 25)	1	(Spain) Real Sociedad
5	DF	Francisco Javier Uría	1 February 1950 (aged 30)	13	(Spain) Sporting Gijón
6	MF	Juan Manuel Asensi (captain)	23 September 1949 (aged 30)	39	(Spain) Barcelona
7	FW	Dani	28 June 1951 (aged 28)	18	(Spain) Athletic Bilbao
8	MF	Julio Cardeñosa	27 October 1949 (aged 30)	7	(Spain) Real Betis
9	FW	Francisco José Carrasco	6 March 1959 (aged 21)	6	(Spain) Barcelona
10	FW	Quini	23 September 1949 (aged 30)	28	(Spain) Sporting Gijón
11	MF	Vicente del Bosque	23 December 1950 (aged 29)	17	(Spain) Real Madrid
12	FW	Juanito	10 November 1954 (aged 25)	14	(Spain) Real Madrid
13	GK	Urruti	17 February 1952 (aged 28)	5	(Spain) Español
14	DF	Rafael Gordillo	24 February 1957 (aged 23)	7	(Spain) Real Betis
15	DF	Antonio Olmo	18 January 1954 (aged 26)	12	(Spain) Barcelona
16	FW	Santillana	23 August 1952 (aged 27)	22	(Spain) Real Madrid
17	FW	Jesús María Satrústegui	12 February 1954 (aged 26)	10	(Spain) Real Sociedad
18	MF	Enrique Saura	2 August 1954 (aged 25)	7	(Spain) Valencia
19	DF	Cundi	13 April 1955 (aged 25)	7	(Spain) Sporting Gijón
20	DF	Miguel Tendillo	1 February 1961 (aged 19)	1	(Spain) Valencia
21	MF	Jesús María Zamora	1 January 1955 (aged 25)	7	(Spain) Real Sociedad
22	GK	Pedro María Artola	6 September 1948 (aged 31)	0	(Spain) Barcelona
