= Urbain Haesaert =

Belgian football manager

Personal information
- Date of birth: 5 May 1941 (age 85)
- Place of birth: Waasmunster, Belgium

Managerial career
- Years: Team
- 1979–1981: Lokeren
- 1981–1982: Berchem Sport
- 1982–1983: Beringen
- 1983–1989: Waregem
- 1990–1993: Germinal Ekeren
- 1993–1995: Royal Antwerp
- 1995–1996: Oostende
- 1996–1998: Eendracht Aalst
- 1998: Eendracht Aalst (scout)
- 1998–2004: Germinal Beerschot Antwerpen (developer)
- 2004–2010: Ajax (scout)
- 2010–2018: Anderlecht (developer)
- 2018–: Ajax (scout)

Urbain Haesaert (born 5 May 1941) is a Belgian football scout and former football manager. He started coaching at Lokeren. Together with Josef Vacenovský, he reached the quarter-finals of the 1980–81 UEFA Cup with Lokeren, and was vice-champion of Belgium, placing second behind Anderlecht in the 1980–81 Belgian First Division.

After bringing Beringen to the First Division A in 1983, Haesaert moved to Waregem. He was able to turn Waregem into a competitive club, and in 1986 he reached the semi-finals of the UEFA Cup with the club.

In 1998 Haesaert quit with managing and became Director of Training at Germinal Beerschot, while in 2004 he became a scout for Ajax. His discoveries, brought from his former club Beerschot to Ajax, include Thomas Vermaelen, Toby Alderweireld, Tom De Mul and Jan Vertonghen. In 2010 he became scout for Anderlecht, playing a role in the discovery of other football talents there, and by 2018 he was back at Ajax.

== Early life ==
Haesaert was born in Waasmunster, East Flanders, Belgium, on 5 May 1941.

== Managerial career ==
=== Beveren ===
Haesaert started as assistant coach to Urbain Braems at KSK Beveren in the 1970s. The club won the Belgian Cup in 1978.

=== Lokeren ===
In 1978 Haesaert started working for KSC Lokeren in the first division. He was again Braems' assistant. Afterwards, he became first coach, forming a trainer duo with Czechoslovak Josef Vacenovský. Lokeren, led by Haesaert and Vacenovsky, surprisingly finished fourth in the Belgian First Division, giving the East Flemish club a European ticket. A season later, Lokeren performed even better. The duo led Lokeren to the final of the Belgian Cup and to the quarter-finals of the UEFA Cup. Further, the club finished second behind R.S.C. Anderlecht in the national championship. In 1981 Robert Waseige succeeded Haesaert, who moved to second division Berchem Sport.

=== Berchem and Beringen ===
Berchem had just been relegated and went looking for promotion. Soon, however, Haesaert exchanged the club for first division team Beringen F.C. Beringen was in a difficult situation and Haesaert was brought in as the replacement for Hans Croon in the course of the season. Nonetheless, the club finished last but one and was relegated. In his second, and first full season at Beringen, Haesaert brought the club back to the first division, by placing fourth in the championship and then winning the promotion round.

=== Waregem ===
In 1983, K.S.V. Waregem chose Haesaert as the successor of manager Sándor Popovics. He introduced new training techniques so that the smaller Waregem in terms of budget could still compete with the bigger clubs. Players like Danny Veyt, Philippe Desmet, Alain Van Baekel and the brothers Luc and Marc Millecamps became the banners of the successful Waregem.

In its home country, the club grew into a worthy middle class. In 1986, Haesaert managed to lead his team to the semi-finals of the UEFA Cup. Both A.C. Milan and Osasuna were knocked out by Waregem that year. Haesaert himself was named Football Manager of the Year at the end of the season.

During the 1989/90 season, Haesaert was fired and replaced by Marc Millecamps, pending a new coach.

=== Germinal Ekeren ===
After a short period without a club, he was introduced in the summer of 1990 as the new manager of Germinal Ekeren, replacing René Desaeyere. Together with players such as Philippe Vande Walle, Mike Verstraeten, Didier Dheedene and Eddy Snelders, he formed the basis for the successes that the club would achieve in the late 1990s. Haesaert himself stayed with Germinal Ekeren for three seasons.

=== Antwerp ===
Haesaert next moved to Antwerp. In his first season at Antwerp he placed fifth, achieving the qualification to the UEFA Cup. He and the club parted ways the next season.

=== Ostend and Aalst ===
After his early departure from Antwerp, KV Oostende attracted the trainer. Ostend had just dropped to the Second Division and hoped to return to the highest level soon. The club lost in the promotion round. Nevertheless, Ostend had an excellent season. However, Haesaert left the club at the end of the season.

In 1996 Aalst fell to the bottom of the standings, firing coach Jan Ceulemans. Haesaert succeeded him and managed to save the club by avoiding relegation that season. After avoiding relegation again next season he left the club.

== Scouting career ==
After his dismissal from Eendracht Aalst, a few clubs again offered themselves, but Haesaert decided to quit as a football manager. He subsequently became Director of Training at Germinal Beerschot, a club that resulted from the merger of his ex-club Germinal Ekeren and Beerschot VAV. Haesaert's policy increased the quality of the youth academy and he was praised for his insight. During that period, the club also began to work closely with Ajax, so that many of Beerschot's youth players eventually came to Ajax. Notable examples include Thomas Vermaelen, Toby Alderweireld, Tom De Mul and Jan Vertonghen.

In 2004 Haesaert's contract expired and he had the intention to leave the football environment. However, Leo Beenhakker, who was technical director of Ajax until 2003, had advised him against this. Louis van Gaal subsequently succeeded Beenhakker as technical director. Together with chairman Arie van Eijden, Van Gaal brought the 63-year-old Haesaert to Ajax. During his time at Ajax Beerschot's players like Jan Vertonghen, Toby Alderweireld, and Tom De Mul were brought to the Dutch club, where they became important players. Haesaert had also advised Ajax to get Mousa Dembélé, and had also Kevin De Bruyne and Eden Hazard on his list.

In March 2010 it was announced that Haesaert would work for RSC Anderlecht from July 2010. During his time at Anderlecht he was involved with the discoveries of the likes of Youri Tielemans, Dennis Praet, and Leander Dendoncker.

In 2018 he was back at Ajax as a scout.

== Honours ==
=== Manager ===
Lokeren

- Belgian First Division A runner-up: 1980–81
- Belgian Cup runner-up: 1981
- UEFA Cup quarter-finalist: 1980–81

Waregem

- UEFA Cup semi-finalist: 1985–86

Individual

- Belgian Manager of the Year: 1985–86
