= Aimé Anthuenis =

Belgian footballer and coach

Personal information
- Date of birth: 21 December 1943 (age 82)
- Place of birth: Lokeren, Belgium
- Position: Defender

Senior career*
Years	Team	Apps	(Gls)
1955–1970	Racing Lokeren		
1970–1974	Lokeren	41	(2)
- Eeklo
- Ertvelde

Managerial career
- 1985–1987: Lokeren
- 1987–1988: Charleroi
- 1988–1993: Lokeren
- 1993–1994: Germinal Ekeren
- 1995–1996: Waregem
- 1996–1999: Genk
- 1999–2002: Anderlecht
- 2002–2005: Belgium
- 2006: Lokeren
- 2008–2009: Germinal Beerschot
- 2010: Lierse
- * Club domestic league appearances and goals

Aimé Anthuenis (born 21 December 1943) is a Belgian former professional football player and manager. He managed the Belgium national football team between 2002 and 2005.

After a career as a defender, Anthuenis moved into coaching, first as the head coach of Lokeren's youth sector, then rising to the position of head coach of the club's first team. In 1994 he reached the semifinals of the Belgian Cup with Germinal Ekeren, while finishing the national championship in 10th place. The next season he moved to Waregem in the Belgian Second Division. Under his lead, Waregem was crowned league champion the same season.

In 1996, Anthuenis signed with Second Division club Racing Genk. He brought the club to the First Division that year, finishing second in the championship. The following season, Anthuenis finished second in the Belgian top tier, and won Genk's first Belgian Cup. The next year, he led the Limburg-based club to their first national championship, winning the 1998–99 Belgian First Division.

Anthuenis left Genk in 1999 to join Anderlecht. He immediately won Anderlecht's 25th title, also qualifying for the UEFA Champions League qualifying round. In August 2000, Anderlecht qualified for the 2000–01 UEFA Champions League by knocking out Porto in the last qualifying round. In the group stage, they won their group, which included also Manchester United, PSV Eindhoven and Dynamo Kyiv. Eventually, Anderlecht was eliminated in the second group stage, finishing third in their group. He finished the season by celebrating the club's 26th title.

Anthuenis won the Belgian Manager of the Year award for a record three times.

== Club career ==
Aimé Anthuenis was born and raised in Lokeren. He started his football career as a youth player of Racing Lokeren, which was renamed K.S.C. Lokeren after the merger with Standaard Lokeren. Anthuenis was a permanent fixture with the Lokeren club. He started as a striker, but later in his career he mainly played as a defender. The club was crowned division champion twice in a row and was quickly promoted from fourth to second division. In 1974 Lokeren achieved promotion to the First Division for the first time. Anthuenis' sporting career was hampered in that period by a serious knee injury. After that season he exchanged the club for fourth division Eeklo. With the club from the Meetjesland he became vice champion twice. After four seasons, he moved to Ertvelde, where he was a player-trainer for two seasons. Anthuenis combined his duties as a football coach with a job at the Ghent University.

== Coaching career ==
=== Lokeren ===
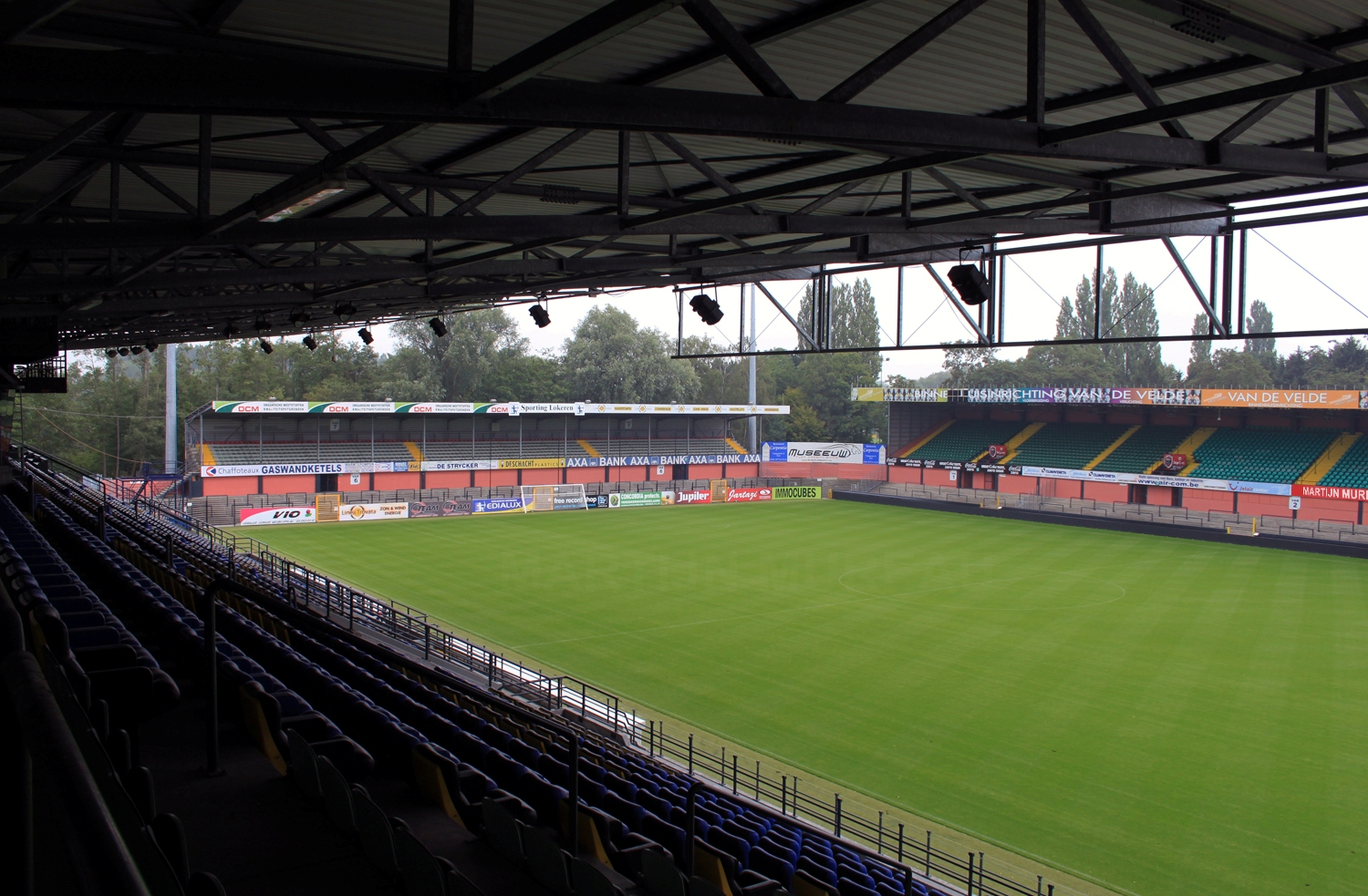
Daknamstadion, Lokeren

After ending his career as a player, Anthuenis returned to Lokeren, where he started his career as a coach. He started working there as a youth trainer and through his work was able to advance to the first team. In the 1984–85 season, Lokeren sacked coach Dimitri Davidović. The then 41-year-old Anthuenis quit his job at the Ghent University and took over as manager at Lokeren. He started with two convincing wins. A season later, Lokeren did not perform as well. They dropped back to fourteenth place under the leadership of Anthuenis, with only four points more than relegated Waterschei. Despite the disappointing season, Anthuenis stayed as head coach. In the summer of 1986 experienced players Raymond Mommens and Maurits De Schrijver left the club, and young players such as Bruno Versavel and Stephen Keshi were given a shot in the first team. The 22-year-old attacker Dimitri M'Buyu scored 17 goals, being just short of top scorer. In May 1987, Lokeren defeated eventual vice-champion Club Brugge 1–4, with goals from Versavel and M'Buyu, among others. The latter also scored twice against Standard Liège, a game that the Lokeren won 1–2. Lokeren eventually finished the season in fourth place, allowing the club to re-join the UEFA Cup for the first time since 1982.

=== Charleroi ===
After Lokeren, Anthuenis moved to Sporting Charleroi, where he was reunited with Raymond Mommens. Under the leadership of Anthuenis, the "Zebras" once again finished safely in the middle bracket in the 1987–88 season.

=== Return to Lokeren ===
Anthuenis returned to Lokeren in 1988. The club had had a bad year and hoped to rejoin the top ten with his return. However, Lokeren, which had lost many of its key players, fell out of the top ten two years in a row. The club was no longer eligible for European football and had several colorless seasons. At the end of January 1993, the 49-year-old trainer was fired and succeeded by Etienne D'Hondt. Eventually, Lokeren ended the season last but one and was relegated.

=== Germinal Ekeren ===
Anthuenis was then hired by Germinal Ekeren, where he succeeded Urbain Haesaert. Anthuenis ended up in the middle bracket with Germinal, finishing tenth. Germinal also reached the semi-finals of the 1994 Belgian Cup, in which it was eliminated by Club Brugge.

=== Waregem ===
After a year at the Antwerp-based club, Anthuenis moved to Waregem, which had been relegated to the second division in 1994. Led by Anthuenis, Waregem became champion of the second division in 1995. In the following season, Waregem had a difficult start and Anthuenis was sacked early in September. He was succeeded by André Van Maldeghem. The club eventually finished last in the championship and was relegated to the Second Division.

=== Genk ===
A month after his resignation from Waregem, Anthuenis signed with Racing Genk. In his first season at the club, Anthuenis finished second in the Second Division with Genk. In the subsequent final round, Genk was able to achieve promotion to the First Division. At Genk, he was considered a father figure in that period, which earned him the nickname Papa.

Genk signed several reinforcements for the 1996–97 season, including Bart Goor and Anthuenis' old acquaintances like Souleymane Oularé. The Ghanaian striker played as a forward with Branko Strupar, who had his big breakthrough under Anthuenis. In 1998, Genk surprisingly finished runners up and conquered the Belgian Cup for the first time. In the final, they beat the then national champions Club Brugge 4–0, with two goals from Oularé. The next season, Anthuenis led Genk to their first national championship. Anthuenis himself was voted Belgian Manager of the Year.

=== Anderlecht ===
After the national title with Genk, Anthuenis moved to Anderlecht. The club had been looking for its 25th national title since 1995 and hoped to win it with the Lokeren-born trainer. Under Anthuenis, the club acquired former Lokeren striker Jan Koller who, together with Tomasz Radzinski, became one of Anderlecht's stars. Anthuenis won the Belgian First Division that year, and was named for the second time Belgian Manager of the Year.

Anderlecht qualified for the UEFA Champions League in August 2000 by eliminating Porto in the last qualifying round. Anderlecht continued to surprise in the group stage of the Champions League. The Brussels team won their group, which included Manchester United, PSV and Dynamo Kyiv. They defeated Manchester United 2–1 at home and PSV 2–3 at the Philips Stadion. In the second group stage, Anderlecht ended up in the group of defending champions Real Madrid, Lazio and Leeds. They won at home against Real (2–0) and Lazio (1–0), but eventually only finished third in their group. That season, Anderlecht was again crowned national champions, while Authensis was named Belgian Manager of the Year for the third time.

Anderlecht finished the 2001–02 Belgian First Division third, while in Champions League it ended fourth in their group with three points. After the end of the season, Anderlecht and Anthuenis parted ways.

=== Belgium national team ===
On 29 June 2002, Anthuenis signed a contract for two and a half years with the Royal Belgian Football Association (KBVB). The Red Devils had just finished the World Cup in Japan and South Korea when Anthuenis took over. He tried to qualify for UEFA Euro 2004 with a new generation of Belgians. Anthuenis brought to the national team and made debut players like Thomas Buffel, Jelle Van Damme, Vincent Kompany and Anthony Vanden Borre. Under Anthuenis, Kompany debuted at just 17 years old.

Belgium was placed in Group 8 in the UEFA Euro 2004 qualifying. They finished behind Bulgaria with the same points as Croatia, tying also on head-to-head points. However, Croatia advanced to the play-offs due to a better head-to-head goal difference.

Despite the failed qualifying campaign, Anthuenis stayed as head coach of Belgium. He was now tasked with guiding the Belgians to the World Cup in Germany. Belgium ended up in Group 7, a group that included Spain. Anthuenis didn't reach the target, with the national team finishing fourth in their group, and failing to qualify for the World Cup for the first time since 1978.

=== Third stint at Lokeren ===
A few months after his last international match as national coach, Anthuenis started working again at Lokeren, despite offers from abroad and the plan to take a break from football. In December 2005, he became Lokeren's new coach. Anthuenis soon had to deal with depression and heart problems. He later explained that he actually had a burnout, after going back to work right away. When Lokeren lost 2–0 to Lierse on 11 February 2006, he was so tired that he called it quits, temporarily withdrawing from football.

=== Germinal Beerschot ===
In 2006, Anthuenis was appointed as technical director at Germinal Beerschot, a position that previously did not exist at the Antwerp club. Marc Brys was then hired as coach. After two years, it was decided to drop the position and not to renew Anthuenis' contract. But a few months after his contract ended, in November 2008, Germinal Beerschot fired trainer Harm van Veldhoven, and this time asked Anthuenis to become their new coach. Anthuenis agreed, and under his leadership Germinal Beerschot finished the season in thirteenth place, avoiding relegation.

The next season, after poor performances by the team, Anthuenis was fired.

=== Lierse ===
In February 2010, Anthuenis signed with Second Division club Lierse. With players like Jurgen Cavens, Tim Matthys and Seth De Witte, he led Lierse to the league title the same year. The club thus returned to the First Division after an absence of three years. However, Anthuenis was sacked after a few months into the 2010–11 Pro League season.

== Personal life ==
Aimé Anthuenis is the brother of PVV politician Georges Anthuenis and the uncle of VLD politician Filip Anthuenis. His brother was mayor of Lokeren from 1995 to 2000. His son Filip succeeded him in 2001.

== Honours ==
=== Manager ===
Waregem

- Belgian Second Division: 1994–95

Genk

- Belgian First Division A: 1998–99
- Belgian Cup: 1997–98
- Jules Pappaert Cup: 1996

Anderlecht

- Belgian First Division A: 1999–2000, 2000–01
- Belgian Super Cup: 2000, 2001
- Jules Pappaert Cup: 2000, 2001

Lierse

- Belgian Second Division: 2009–10

Individual

- Belgian Manager of the Year: 1998–99, 1999–2000, 2000–01
