= Robert Goethals =

Belgian football coach (1922–2011)

Personal information
- Full name: Robertus Carolus Cornelius Goethals
- Date of birth: 16 June 1922
- Place of birth: Brasschaat, Belgium
- Date of death: 7 July 2011 (aged 89)
- Place of death: Ypres, Belgium
- Height: 1.73 m (5 ft 8 in)
- Position: Midfielder

Senior career*
Years	Team	Apps	(Gls)
1937–1948	ARA La Gantoise	19	(0)
1939–1942	RFC Malinois	0	(0)
1948–1951	Waregem		
1951–1955	Roeselare		

Managerial career
- 1950–1951: Waregem
- 1951–1955: Roeselare
- KVK Ieper
- FC Roeselare
- VG Oostende
- Tournai
- 1978–1981: Beveren
- 1981–1984: Gent
- * Club domestic league appearances and goals

Robert Goethals (16 June 1922 – 7 July 2011) was a Belgian football player and coach.

== Playing career ==
Goethals was born in Brasschaat. A midfielder, he played at AA Gent during and after the Second World War. He played 19 games with the team in the First Division. 1948, Goethals signed a contract in Third Division SV Waregem and he finished his career at SK Roeselare in Fourth Division.

== Managerial career ==
Goethals studied Physical Education and started a career as coach after his playing career. In 1978–79, he graduated to First Division. Before, he had been the coach of, among others VG Oostende and KSV Waregem. Goethals was the successor of Urbain Braems at SK Beveren. 1979, Beveren was champion in First Division ahead of Anderlecht which was coached by his namesake Raymond Goethals.

The year Beveren won the title, the team played as Cup winner in the Europacup II. Goethals coached his team in the quarter-finals beyond Inter Milan. In the semi-finals, the team lost 1–0 to FC Barcelona.

In 1980, Beveren reached once again the finals of the Belgian Cup, but the Limburg team Waterschei SV Thor won this game by 2–1. Goethals stayed one more season at Beveren and was succeeded by his predecessor Braems.

Goethals started at AA Gent, with players such as Tony Rombouts, Aad Koudijzer, Jean-Claude Bouvy, and Johan Vermeersch. He guided Gent to the subtop of Belgium, in contrast to a pair of seasons before, when it played in Second Division. Several times he won a European ticket. In 1984, Gent reached the final of the Belgian Cup. After a 0–0 draw and extra time, the Buffalos beat Anderlecht on penalties. It was the second trophy in the history of the team. At the end of the season, Goethals left and started working for the KBVB.

When the Pro Licence was started in 1998, Goethals was appointed as a teacher, together with his contemporaries Raymond Goethals and Guy Thys. In those days, he taught, among others, Georges Leekens, Hugo Broos, and Aimé Anthuenis. He did this job in service of the Pro Licence until 2003. He died in Ypres.
