= 1978–79 Belgian First Division =

76th season of top-tier football in Belgium

Belgian First Division
- Season: 1978–79

Statistics of Belgian First Division in the 1978–79 season.

== Overview ==
Location of teams in Belgian First Division 1978–79

It was contested by 18 teams, and K.S.K. Beveren won the championship for the first time in club history.

== League standings ==
Pos	Team	Pld	W	D	L	GF	GA	GD	Pts	Qualification or relegation
1	K.S.K. Beveren	34	19	11	4	62	24	+38	49	Qualified for 1979–80 European Cup
2	R.S.C. Anderlecht	34	21	3	10	76	41	+35	45	Qualified for 1979–80 UEFA Cup
3	Standard Liège	34	17	10	7	46	30	+16	44	Qualified for 1979–80 UEFA Cup
4	Lokeren	34	16	10	8	54	33	+21	42	
5	R.W.D. Molenbeek	34	17	7	10	57	41	+16	41	
6	Club Brugge K.V.	34	14	10	10	51	49	+2	38	
7	Royal Antwerp FC	34	11	13	10	44	41	+3	35	
8	Lierse S.K.	34	13	7	14	44	48	−4	33	
9	R. Charleroi S.C.	34	13	7	14	44	49	−5	33	
10	FC Winterslag	34	10	13	11	45	47	−2	33	
11	K. Waterschei S.V. Thor Genk	34	10	12	12	42	44	−2	32	
12	Beerschot	34	12	7	15	46	51	−5	31	Qualified for 1979–80 European Cup Winners' Cup
13	Beringen FC	34	9	11	14	38	47	−9	29	
14	K.S.V. Waregem	34	7	15	12	33	47	−14	29	
15	K Berchem Sport	34	8	12	14	30	46	−16	28	
16	R.F.C. de Liège	34	10	6	18	49	55	−6	26	
17	R.A.A. Louviéroise	34	8	8	18	45	79	−34	24	Relegated to Division II
18	K.V. Kortrijk	34	5	10	19	27	61	−34	20	Relegated to Division II

== Results ==
Home \ Away	AND	ANT	BEE	BRC	BER	BEV	CLU	CHA	KOR	FCL	LIE	LOK	LOU	MOL	STA	WAR	WTG	WIN
Anderlecht		3–1	2–1	2–0	1–0	3–1	3–0	7–2	7–2	4–1	3–0	1–0	7–0	1–3	2–0	5–0	1–1	1–2
Antwerp	1–0		2–2	0–0	1–1	0–0	2–4	2–1	3–1	3–0	3–0	1–1	2–3	1–0	1–0	1–1	0–0	1–1
Beerschot	1–2	0–3		3–0	5–2	0–0	0–2	2–0	4–1	2–0	3–0	3–0	3–0	1–3	1–3	0–0	3–1	3–0
Berchem	1–3	1–0	2–2		3–2	0–0	0–0	1–1	1–0	1–1	1–0	0–1	2–1	0–1	1–1	1–1	0–1	1–1
Beringen	2–3	2–0	0–0	3–0		0–0	1–1	1–0	1–1	2–0	0–0	1–0	4–1	1–2	1–0	1–1	2–2	0–1
Beveren	2–1	3–1	5–0	2–0	5–1		2–0	2–1	5–0	3–0	2–0	3–0	3–1	3–0	1–2	0–1	2–0	0–0
Club Brugge	3–0	0–0	2–0	1–1	2–1	2–1		5–1	2–1	2–1	2–1	1–6	2–1	1–3	3–1	1–0	2–0	2–2
Charleroi	4–1	2–1	1–0	1–2	0–1	2–2	2–1		2–0	3–1	1–4	0–0	3–0	0–1	1–2	2–1	2–1	2–1
Kortrijk	1–4	0–2	0–2	0–3	3–0	1–1	1–1	0–0		0–0	2–1	1–1	1–1	1–1	1–0	1–3	0–0	0–1
Liège	4–0	1–1	3–0	3–1	4–1	1–2	5–2	1–2	2–0		0–3	3–0	3–3	0–1	1–2	4–0	4–0	2–0
Lierse	0–1	0–0	1–0	1–1	2–1	0–1	1–0	1–1	2–0	3–2		1–1	3–0	0–3	1–3	2–0	1–0	1–0
Lokeren	2–1	2–2	4–0	1–0	2–1	1–1	0–0	1–0	2–0	3–1	3–0		7–0	3–1	0–2	1–0	2–1	0–0
La Louvière	3–2	0–2	1–0	5–0	1–1	2–4	2–2	2–4	0–0	2–0	1–2	1–5		4–1	0–2	2–0	2–4	2–0
Molenbeek	0–2	5–3	4–0	3–1	0–1	0–1	2–0	2–0	2–3	1–0	2–1	0–0	1–1		0–0	5–1	2–2	4–2
Standard Liège	1–0	1–0	1–1	1–0	0–0	0–1	2–1	1–1	1–0	4–0	2–2	4–3	2–2	2–1		1–0	0–0	0–1
Waregem	1–1	0–1	0–3	0–0	1–1	1–1	1–1	1–0	3–2	1–1	3–3	0–0	5–0	1–1	2–2		2–1	1–0
Waterschei Thor	0–0	4–1	5–0	1–0	2–1	1–1	2–2	0–0	2–3	3–0	2–4	1–2	1–0	2–0	0–0	1–0		0–0
Winterslag	1–2	2–2	1–1	3–5	3–1	2–2	3–1	1–2	1–0	0–0	4–3	2–0	1–1	2–2	1–3	1–1	5–1	

Legend: Blue = home team win; Yellow = draw; Red = away team win.

== Attendances ==
No.	Club	Average attendance	Change	Highest
1	Anderlecht	19,529	5,1%	35,000
2	Standard	16,882	-6,8%	30,000
3	Club Brugge	15,412	2,3%	31,000
4	Beveren	13,735	30,8%	18,000
5	RWDM	11,441	-1,8%	25,000
6	Charleroi	11,029	0,3%	20,000
7	Waterschei	10,647	-37,4%	9,000
8	RAAL	9,824	4,6%	15,000
9	Beerschot	8,882	8,6%	19,000
10	Liège	8,176	-24,9%	23,000
11	Beringen	8,176	11,6%	16,000
12	Lierse	7,765	-18,5%	15,000
13	Antwerp	7,559	-3,2%	18,000
14	Lokeren	7,235	-7,5%	17,000
15	Winterslag	6,788	-17,6%	18,000
16	Waregem	6,235	-22,3%	15,000
17	Kortrijk	6,059	-4,6%	14,000
18	Berchem	5,424	54,1%	14,000
