= KSK Beveren =

Association football club in Belgium

- Full name: Koninklijke Sportkring; Beveren
- Nickname: Leeuwen (Lions)
- Founded: 1 July 1934 (creation); 6 September 1935 (registration)
- Ground: G-terrein Freethielcomplex, Beveren
- Capacity: 700
- Manager: (Belgium) Robby Buyens
- Website: kskbeveren.be
Home colours	Away colours

KSK Beveren (Royal Sporting Club of Beveren) is a Belgian football club from Beveren in East Flanders. The club became national champion twice in its existence and won the Belgian Cup twice. The men's branch of the club was temporarily discontinued in 2010, until 2022 only the women's team played at the Royal Belgian Football Association under founding number 2300. In 2022, after an agreement with Waasland-Beveren, the founding number was released again for men's football, so the club has been active since the 2022–23 season again with a men's team. KSK Beveren is the first football club in Belgium that is completely controlled by supporters and is bound by the principles of Supporters Direct.

== History ==
=== 1922–1949: Origins and early years ===
Association football has a history in Beveren that goes back to the year 1922 when a local team called 'Standaard Beveren' was founded under the influence of local businessman Paul Verhaert. The club became a member of the Belgian Football Association and received the 'Matricule 737' (the federation's registration number). Financial problems led to the dissolution of the club in May 1931.

A few years later, with football booming all over Europe, the foundations were laid for what would become KSK Beveren. On 23 July 1934 a local pub ('De Graanmaat') owner received a request from a club of the nearby Municipality of Temse to form a team of players of the former 'Standaard' team and play a game against them. The selection of Beverenplayers won by 1–2 and decided to form a new club: Sportkring Beveren (or SK Beveren) became an official member of the Belgian Football Association on 6 September 1935 and received the 'Matricule 2300'.

SKB immediately became successful in the local leagues with two titles in a row. In 1938 the club moved to the Velodrome of local beer brewer and entrepreneur Frederik Thielemans, to whom the stadium was eventually named: the Freethiel Stadion. KSK Beveren remained at the site until 2010 and the stadium is up to the present day still used by Waasland-Beveren, while KSK Beveren uses a nearby training field as its home ground in the same sports park. Football in Belgium during World War II was organized in emergency leagues, so as a consequence SK Beveren freshly started the 1945–1946 season in the highest provincial league. In 1947 influential chairman Louis Verhaert came into power, leading his club to the national divisions for the first time in 1949, winning the league in an away game against Herzele.

=== 1949–1967: Rise to the highest division ===
SK Beveren-Waes needed little time to adapt to life in the national divisions. It took the club only three years to eventually promote from the Belgian Fourth Division to the Belgian Third Division predominantly using local players and often counting on the heroics of their goalkeeper Walter De Winter. In the second game of the playoffs for promotion Beveren had already enough with a 2–1 win against Willebroek to secure their rise to a higher division.

Between 1952 and 1960 the club stayed in the Belgian Third Division, regularly battling against relegation and at the end losing the battle by only reaching 15th place in the 1959–1960 season. However, SK Beveren would come back stronger than ever before. During its three-year stay in the Belgian Fourth Division the club started to give chances to a group of local players who would become known as the golden generation of SK Beveren. Most of them learned playing the game on a local playing field, nicknamed 't Congoken due to its sandy pitch, similar to the local public image of playing fields in Africa at that time and referring to the Democratic Republic of the Congo, a former colony of Belgium. The former site now serves as a parking lot, but is still remembered with two sculptures representing goals. Amongst the players were prolific striker Robert Rogiers, playmaker Omer Janssens, winger Jean Janssens, centre back Freddy Buyl and central midfielder Wilfried Van Moer.

In 1963, an unstoppable Beveren won the Belgian Fourth Division with 16 points (in the old two point system) in front of second-placed Brasschaat, without losing a single match and scoring 111 goals along the way. In 1964, the club reached the last 16 of the Belgian Cup for the first time, eventually losing as a third division club to first division club Cerle Brugge. After two third-place finishes, Beveren became champion in the Belgian Third Division in 1966. The title was won in an away game in Zwevegem, where Beveren obtained a 2–2 draw after a late goal from Robert Rogiers. The rise of the club, with especially the attacking type of play in mind, didn't go unnoticed in the rest of Belgium, with references in the media to the club as the "little Anderlecht". Under the new coach Guy Thys, Beveren directly promoted to the highest division in 1967, by winning the Belgian Second Division in the final game of the season at UR Namur with Mon Goossens scoring the deciding goal in a 2–3 win.

=== 1967–1977: Rise to power ===
SK Beveren-Waes debuted in the Belgian First Division with a 1–1 draw on 3 September 1967 in an away game at Sint-Truidense, with Jean Janssens scoring the club's first goal in the highest division. Their first win followed a week later, when the newly promoted team beat Daring Molenbeek with 2–0 at home. On 26 November 1967, the freshly renovated and extended Freethiel Stadion's attendance record was broken when more than 18 000 people saw Beveren lose at home against Anderlecht with 1–2. Beveren ended its first season in the highest division on a 13th place. The 1968–1969 season brought a surprising sixth place with it, partly due to the goalscoring qualities of Robert Rogiers who ended as vice-topscorer with 16 goals. In the summer of 1969, the club enjoyed its first European exploits with participation in the Rappan Cup, ending in second place in group nine, consisting of B 1909, Odra Opole and Le-Chaux-de-Fonds. Led by new manager Ward Volkaert, and inspired by the excellent performances of Jean Janssens, who received his first international call-ups for the Belgium National Football Team, Beveren ended the season in fourth place, qualifying for the 1970–71 Inter-Cities Fairs Cup.

In the summer of 1970, the club again participated in the Rappan Cup, finishing as third in a group with Östers, Werder Bremen and LASK. The 1970–71 season proved to be average at the national level, but the club had a remarkable run in the 1970–71 Inter-Cities Fairs Cup. After beating Wiener Sport-Club in the round of 32, Beveren met Spanish giant Valencia in the next round, achieving a historic win in Spain thanks to a goal of Hugo De Raeymaeker. In the return game, Beveren held Valencia to a 1–1 draw (again a goal of De Raeymaeker), obtaining a spot in the next round. Beveren was eventually eliminated by powerhouse Arsenal, losing 4–0 at Highbury and drawing 0–0 at home.

Against all expectations, Beveren ended the 1971-72 Belgian First Division as 16th and last, relegating to the Second Division. The relegation was confirmed on 9 April 1972, in an away game at Crossing Schaerbeek, where legendary goalkeeper Jean-Marie Pfaff made his debut. The club managed to keep their most important players and appointed Rik Matthijs as new manager. On 24 September 1972, won the first ever Waasland derby game against arch rivals Sporting Lokeren with 3–2. SK Beveren-Waes eventually won the title in the Belgian Second Division on 8 April 1973 against K. Boom. The club became a founding member of the Pro League in February 1974. Beveren had a good run in the 1973-74 Belgian Cup, reaching the quarter-finals for the first time, but losing to Tongeren. After two years in charge, Matthijs was replaced by Armand Jurion as manager in the summer of 1974. The club also signed two unknown prospects who would become one of the best Belgian full-backs of their generation, namely Marc Baecke and Eddy Jaspers. Jurion's reign was momentary and after one season he was replaced by Urbain Braems, who would become one of the most influential coaches in the club's history. The club ended the 1975-76 Belgian First Division in a meritorious sixth place, but failed to confirm the next with a disappointing 13th place.

=== 1977–1988: Golden years ===
With lowered ambitions, the club made a quite anonymous transfer that would however make a huge impact in the Golden Years, buying German midfielder Heinz Schönberger from Mechelen in the Belgian Second Division. Beveren reached the final of the first-ever Beker van Vlaanderen, a pre-season tournament for Flemish teams, eventually losing by penalties from Waregem. The club played an excellent first half of the season and stood in third place in December, eventually ending the 1977–78 Belgian First Division in fifth place. In January 1978, Louis Verhaert, after 31 years of service, transferred his chair of the club to Jan Van Ussel, who would become the most successful and respected chairman in the club's history. On 21 May 1978, the club won its very first major trophy by winning the Belgian Cup. Beveren knocked out Witgoor Dessel, K. Boom, Tongeren and Sporting Lokeren, before winning the final against Charleroi with 2–0, due to two late goals of Johan Coninx and Bob Stevens.

The club changed its name, to SK Beveren, in 1978 (following the name change of the municipality of Beveren in the 1977 Fusion of the Belgian municipalities). The 1978-1979 season became the most successful in the club's history. The departed coach Urbain Braems, who moved to archrival KSC Lokeren, was replaced by the duo Robert Goethals and Rik Pauwels, who respectively served as technical advisor and field trainer. The unknown German forward Erwin Albert was acquired for approximately 1.5 million Belgian francs from Hertha BSC and became the top scorer in the Belgian First Division that season with 28 goals. Goalkeeper Jean-Marie Pfaff, now also the established goalkeeper of the Belgian national football team, won the Belgian Golden Shoe in January. SK Beveren, whose squad consisted of a majority of amateur players with full-time day jobs (unlike the traditional top clubs of the country), clinched its very first national title on 12 May 1979, with two matchdays remaining, securing it with a 0–0 draw against Beringen. In the same season, Beveren also had a miraculous run in the 1978–79 European Cup Winners' Cup. After eliminating Ballymena United and HNK Rijeka in the early rounds, they faced the mighty Inter Milan in the quarter-finals. Following a 0–0 draw at San Siro, Beveren qualified on 21 March 1979, with a 1–0 victory at the Freethiel. The legendary goal in the 85th minute was scored by Bob Stevens, assisted by Wim Hofkens. In the semi-finals, Beveren faced the eventual champions, Barcelona. They suffered defeats both at the Camp Nou and at home with a score of 1–0. The goals in both matches were scored from penalties, respectively by Carles Rexach and Hans Krankl.

Beveren managed to retain its successful team, but failed to meet expectations in the 1979–1980 season. The club, a frequent participant in international summer tournaments, reached the final of the Trofeo Colombino only to lose to the host, Recreativo. On 22 August 1979 Beveren became the first winner of the Belgian Super Cup after a penalty shootout, defeating the home team Beerschot at the Olympisch Stadion (1–1 in regular time). The 1979-80 Belgian First Division was far from a success for Beveren, as the reigning champions finished in eleventh place. In the 1979-80 European Cup, Beveren was eliminated in the first round by Servette. However, the club did reach the Belgian Cup final for the second time, after defeating teams like KSC Lokeren, Club Brugge, and Standard Liège. Despite being the favorite, Beveren unexpectedly lost to Thor Waterschei in the final. Erwin Albert did equalize the 1–0 lead (scored by Pier Janssen) from a penalty kick, but seven minutes before the end, Jos Heyligen scored the decisive 2-1 goal from a free-kick. A very inconsistent season was brightened by an experienced club legend: in January, Jean Janssens won the Belgian Golden Shoe. At 35 years old, he was the oldest winner of the prestigious award for quite some time until he was surpassed by Lorenzo Staelens, who was only a few months older, in 2000.

Beveren strengthened themselves in the summer of 1980, among others, with Wilfried Van Moer. The 35-year-old midfielder returned to his former club and finished fourth in the 1980 Ballon d'Or voting on 30 December 1980. On 24 August 1980 Beveren lost the Belgian Super Cup to reigning champion Club Brugge at the Heysel Stadium after penalty kicks (1–1 in regular time). Losing Belgian Cup finalist Beveren played in the Super Cup because Thor Waterschei was not a member of the Pro League. During pre-season Beveren did however win its first Beker van Vlaanderen, beating Kortrijk in the final. Beveren finished the 1980-81 Belgian First Division season in fourth place, thus qualifying once again for European football. The season was largely overshadowed by an incident in the quarter-finals of the Belgian Cup against KSC Lokeren. After the match, assistant referee Rene Thirion accused goalkeeper Jean-Marie Pfaff of giving him a knee blow in the dressing rooms. Although Pfaff has always denied this, the accusation resulted in a heavy suspension of six months for the goalkeeper. This punishment was remarkable due to its severity and because Pfaff was one of the most well-known and beloved players in Belgium at that time. Pfaff was also one of the key figures of the Belgian national team.

The 1981-82 Belgian First Division marked the return of manager Urbain Braems, who led the team to their first major trophy in 1978. The successful team, meanwhile, continued to change every season. Albert Cluytens left for RSC Anderlecht, and club legend Jean Janssens decided to play football at a lower level. However, two key players—Paul Theunis and Ronny Martens—were brought to the Freethiel. It was a lackluster season for the club. In the league, only a seventh place was achieved. In the Belgian Cup, THOR Waterschei proved to be the better team in the semi-finals.

Fortunes turned the next season despite the departures of Jean-Marie Pfaff (to Bayern Munich) and Wilfried Van Moer (to Sint-Truidense VV). The club kept investing in experienced and strong players and bought Paul Lambrichts and Polish winger Marek Kusto. In the Belgian Cup, Beveren beat Union Namur, KSV Oudenaarde, Eendracht Aalst, KFC Winterslag and KSC Lokeren, before winning the Belgian Cup Final against Club Brugge. It ended 3–1 in front of 50,000 spectators at the Heyzel, with goals by Paul Theunis, Ronny Martens, and Heinz Schönberger. The 1982-83 Belgian First Division was ended in sixth place. The season was also marked by the rising of 18 year old goalkeeper Filip De Wilde as the replacement of Jean-Marie Pfaff.

In 1984, the club's name changed to K.S.K. Beveren.

=== Early 2000s: Resurgence with Ivorian players ===
During the 2001–2002 season, Beveren finished in eighteenth place but were saved from relegation because Eendracht Aalst and RWDM were not licensed. Chairman Frans van Hoof then appointed Jean-Marc Guillou as technical director and gave him great freedom with regard to the club's policy. Beveren, which was in financial and sporting trouble, was revived in the following seasons thanks to the arrival of many young Ivorian players from the ASEC Mimosas football academy of Guillou from Abidjan, (Ivory Coast). And a collaboration realized by Guillou with Arsenal, where his friend Arsène Wenger was a trainer, as a result of which players such as Graham Stack and Igors Stepanovs were loaned out to KSK Beveren. However, it became clear from the start that the collaboration with Arsenal did not bring what was expected of it, for example, players of lesser quality were placed in Beveren in dribs and drabs. Fortunately, the young Ivorian players were of an exceptionally high level. Some of them ended up at the absolute European top after their passage at KSK Beveren, such as Emmanuel Eboué and Gervinho at Arsenal, Arthur Boka at VfB Stuttgart and Romaric at Sevilla to name the most important. Yaya Touré even managed to win the 2008–09 UEFA Champions League with Barcelona and became the second former Beveren player to win the highest European prize.

In the 2003/04 season, Beveren played the final of the Belgian Cup for the fifth time in its existence, the opponent was Club Brugge. The final took place in the King Baudouin Stadium. Beveren lost 4–2, but still got a ticket for the UEFA Cup because Club Brugge had finished second in the competition and was allowed to go to the preliminary rounds of the Champions League. Beveren managed to survive the first round of the Uefa Cup season 2004-2005 and to advance to the group round. Partly due to a lack of experience, Beveren could not win a single match and was eliminated. The 1-0 lost match against Heerenveen on 15 December 2005 is known as the last European match of Beveren.

In 2006, they were threatened with the loss of their professional licence and subsequent relegation to the third division, but eventually won an appeal to preserve their status. In 2007, however, the club ended last in the Jupiler League and was forced to go to the second division.

=== 2010: Temporary end of the first team ===
In 2009, by bringing Johan Boskamp back to the club and having him sign for three seasons, they tried to draw up a three-year plan, in which a major role was reserved for Belgian youth players. However, Boskamp was fired on 27 December 2009 due to disappointing results, partly caused by his long absence due to a serious lung infection. At that time, the ambitious Beveren was in penultimate place in the Belgian Second Division. Boskamp was replaced ad interim by David Penneman. On 22 April 2010, it became known that Beveren would not apply for a license for the Second Division, the club voluntarily relegated to the Third Division. In the spring of 2010, under pressure from Beveren mayor Marc Van de Vijver, the first team and youth teams wanted to merge with RS Waasland. Because the application had not been submitted in time according to the regulations of the Belgian Football Association, they had to postpone the merger until after the 2010/11 season. However, instead Beveren decided not to give in to political pressure and to keep the honor to itself by no longer entering the competition with the men's team the following season, but only with its youth teams. As a result, the merger fell through. To gain a foothold in Beveren, RS Waasland changed into KVRS Waasland - SK Beveren and this club played in the stadium of Beveren in the 2011/12 season. Partly because of this, the 75th anniversary of the first team of Beveren came to a temporary end.

The founding number was not deleted: Beveren had started a women's team in 2009, so that the club with founding number 2300 could remain active in women's football. In January 2011, supporters of KSK Beveren who could not agree with the disappearance of the original men's team founded the non-profit association Eskabee 1935 to revive KSK Beveren as a full-fledged football club. The non-profit association Eskabee 1935 succeeded in its aim and joined the KBVB with the new football club Yellow Blue Beveren and founding number 9577. From 2011/12, that club started at the very lowest level, Fourth provincial.

=== 2022: New start ===
Due to the agreement between Waasland Beveren and KSK Beveren, a men's team started again in the 2022–2023 season for the first time since 2010 under the founding number 2300, and this in 1st Provincial East Flanders. As part of the agreement, permission was also given to play at the Freethiel a number of times per season. The stadium where KSK Beveren played all its home games from its foundation in 1935 until its temporary closure in 2010. On Saturday 17 September, KSK Beveren played an official match at the Freethiel against neighbor Svelta Melsele for the first time in 12 years. The match was attended by more than 1000 fans and Beveren won 1–0. In the same season, Beveren participated in the Fenix Trophy for the first time. A European competition between clubs that act according to the principle of Supporters Direct, i.e. fan owned clubs. The first European match since 2005 was played on Tuesday, 15 November 2022 on English soil against F.C. United of Manchester at Broadhurst Park and was, despite being an equal match, defeated 4–1. A week later on Thursday, 24 November, the 2nd European game followed at home against the Spanish CD Cuenca-Mestallistes, which was won 4–1. In its first season, KSKB competed for the title in 1st Provincial for a long time, eventually finishing 4th in its series. This allowed it to participate in the interprovincial final round for promotion to 3rd amateur. However, in the first round it was eliminated by the Flemish Brabant Fenixx Beigem Humbeek 2–0. In the off-season, former player Robby Buyens was appointed as sports manager, to reinforce the ambition of forcing promotion to 3rd amateur. During the 2023–24 season, the collaboration with trainer Kristof Smet was terminated on October 2, 2023, after a number of disappointing results. A few days later, Mathias Smet, who came over from neighbor Svelta Melsele, was appointed as the new trainer. Despite the ambition to be promoted, Beveren ended the 2023–24 season in a disappointing 4th place. The final round also brought no improvement as it was eliminated in the first round by the Limburg Weerstand Koersel, who won 1–2 in the Freethiel stadium on Sunday 5 May 2024. Beveren also participated in the Fenix Trophy during the 2023–24 season. Both matches against the English Lewes FC were lost 4–0 and 1–3. The other team in the group stage was the Norwegian Oslo City FC, who were beaten 1–0 at home, and the return match was forfeited because the match day coincided with the interprovincial final round. Halfway through the 2024–25 season, Mathias Smet was fired in early December due to disappointing results. Robby Buyens, the club's sports manager, took over the remaining matches as interim in December, and at the end of December he was officially appointed as coach of KSK Beveren until the end of the season.

== Arsenal controversy ==
Between 2001 and 2006, the club had a co-operation agreement with English Premier League club Arsenal. Several players were loaned between the teams and friendlies were played. The agreement expired on 1 July 2006.

Subsequent to an investigation by BBC Television's Newsnight, FIFA requested the English Football Association investigate the relationship between the two clubs.

In 2001, Belgian police concluded that a loan of over €1.5 million had been made by Arsenal to the company Goal, which helped secure Beveren's financial position. Newsnight have alleged this may breach club ownership rules under FIFA regulations. The accusation is refuted by Arsenal, who states that the payment was an interest-free loan and has no effect on the administration of the club. The FA and FIFA cleared both clubs of any wrongdoing.

Several players have been loaned between the two clubs or had trials. Only Emmanuel Eboué completed a permanent move between the clubs in this time period, from Beveren to Arsenal.

== Former players ==
- (Belgium) Jean-Marie Pfaff
- (Belgium) Filip De Wilde
- (Belgium) Geert De Vlieger
- (Belgium) Erwin Lemmens
- (Belgium) Wilfried Van Moer
- (England) David Fairclough
- (Poland) Marek Kusto
- (Netherlands) Wim Hofkens
- (Netherlands) Peter van Vossen
- (Netherlands) Maurice van Ham
- (Netherlands) Remco Torken
- (Netherlands) Eric Viscaal
- (Netherlands) Edwin van Ankeren
- (Czech Republic) Lambert Šmíd
- (Ivory Coast) Yaya Touré
- (Ivory Coast) Emmanuel Eboué
- (Ivory Coast) Gervinho
- (Ivory Coast) Romaric
- (Ivory Coast) Gilles Yapi Yapo
- (Ivory Coast) Copa
- (Ivory Coast) Arthur Boka
- (Ivory Coast) Igor Lolo
- (Ivory Coast) Arsène Né
- (Ivory Coast) Marco Né

== Noted managers ==
- 1966–1969: (Belgium) Guy Thys
- 1974–1975: (Belgium) Jef Jurion
- 1975–1978: (Belgium) Urbain Braems
- 1981–1984: (Belgium) Urbain Braems
- 1984–1986: (Belgium) Rik Pauwels
- 1986–1988: (Czechoslovakia) Ladislav Novák
- 1988–1989: (Belgium) René Desaeyere
- 1990–1992: (Netherlands) Johan Boskamp
- 1992–1995: (Belgium) Jos Daerden
- 1995–1996: (Belgium) René Desaeyere, (Serbia and Montenegro) Dimitri Davidovic, (Netherlands) Barry Hulshoff
- 1999–2001: (Belgium) Emilio Ferrera
- 2001–2002: (France) Jean-Marc Guillou, (France) Regis Laguesse, (Belgium) Thierry Pister
- 2005–2006: (France) Vincent Dufour
- 2006–2007: (Belgium) Walter Meeuws
- 2007–2009: (Belgium) Alex Czerniatynski
- 2009–2010: (Netherlands) Johan Boskamp
- 2022–2023: (Belgium) Kristof Smet
- 2023–2024: (Belgium) Mathias Smet
- 2024–present: (Belgium) Robby Buyens

== Honours ==
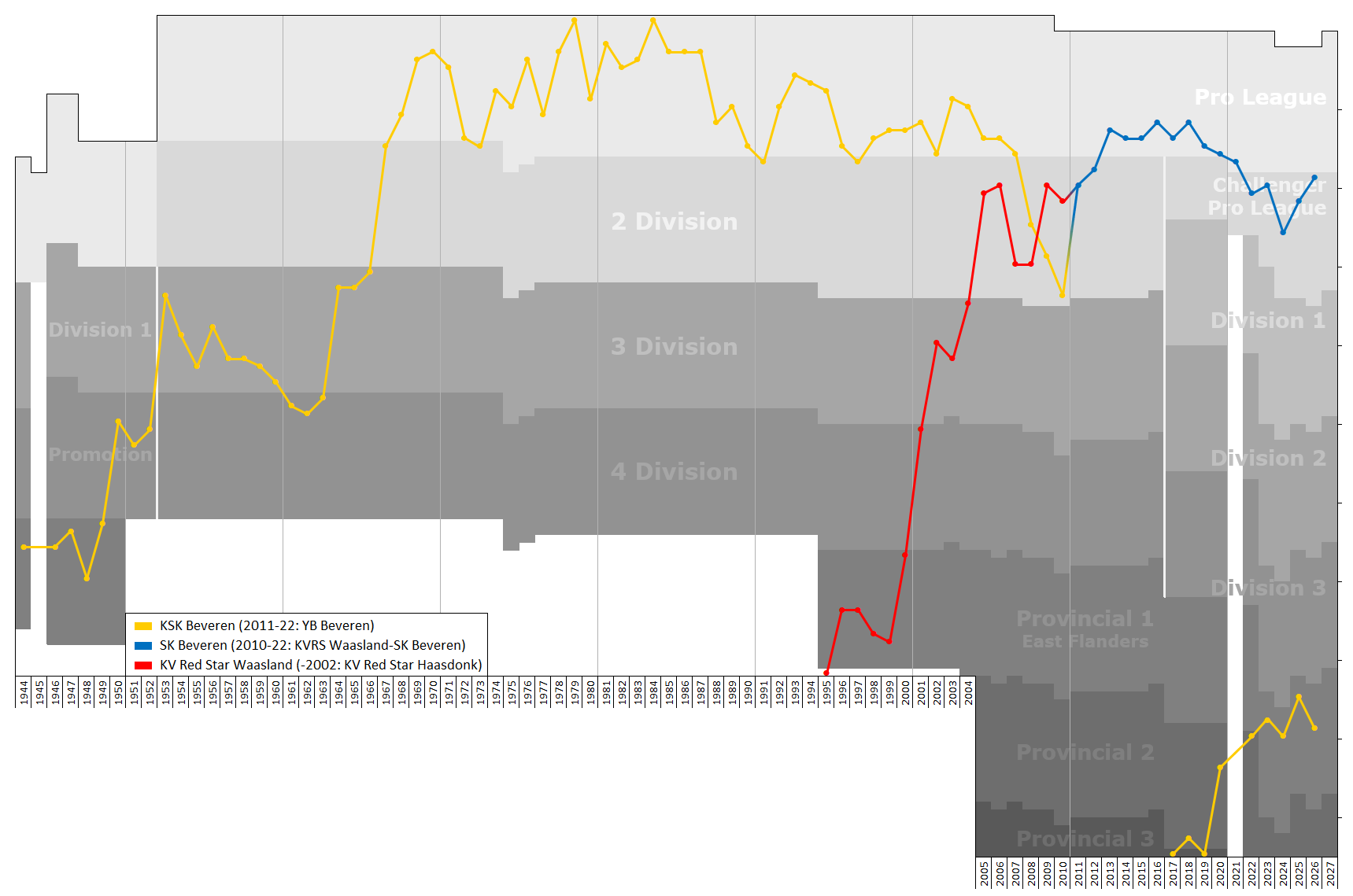
Historical chart of Beveren league performance

- Belgian First Division:
  - Winners (2): 1978–79, 1983–84
- Belgian Second Division:
  - Winners (4): 1966–67, 1972–73, 1990–91, 1996–97
- Belgian Cup:
  - Winners (2): 1977–78, 1982–83
  - Runners-up (3): 1979–80, 1984–85, 2003–04
- Belgian Supercup:
  - Winners (2): 1979, 1984
  - Runners-up (2): 1980, 1983

== European record ==
As of 5 March 2006:

Competition	APP	P	W	D	L	GF	GA
UEFA Champions League	2	6	2	2	2	11	8
UEFA Cup Winners' Cup	2	12	6	3	3	17	9
UEFA Cup	4	22	9	3	10	30	30
UEFA Intertoto Cup	1	4	1	1	2	6	8
