= Marcel De Corte (footballer) =

Belgian footballer

Personal information
- Date of birth: 25 November 1929
- Place of birth: Sint-Truiden, Belgium
- Date of death: 27 February 2017 (aged 87)
- Positions: Inside forward; winger

Senior career*
Years	Team	Apps	(Gls)
1947–1950	RC Gand		
1950–1954	Anderlecht		
1954–1955	CS Léopoldville		
1955–1959	Anderlecht		
1959–1960	ARA La Gantoise		
1960–1961	KSV Waregem		
- Charleroi

International career
1954	Belgium	3	(0)
- * Club domestic league appearances and goals

Marcel De Corte (25 November 1929 – 27 February 2017) was a Belgian footballer who played as an inside forward and winger.

== Career ==
Born in Sint-Truiden, De Corte played club football for RC Gand, Anderlecht, CS Léopoldville, ARA La Gantoise, KSV Waregem and Charleroi.

He made three appearances for the Belgium national team in 1954.

== Later life and death ==
De Corte died on 27 February 2017 at the age of 87.
