= Paul Theunis =

Belgian footballer

Personal information
- Full name: Paul Theunis
- Date of birth: 16 March 1952 (age 74)
- Place of birth: Koersel, Belgium
- Height: 1.77 m (5 ft 9 1/2 in)
- Position: Midfielder

Senior career*
Years	Team	Apps	(Gls)
1971–1973	Beringen F.C.		
1973–1981	F.C. Winterslag		
1981–1987	K.S.K. Beveren		
1987–1988	KV Mechelen	18	(1)
1988–1989	K. Sint-Niklase S.K.E.		

International career
1984	Belgium	2	(0)

Managerial career
- 1990–1991: K.R.C. Genk
- 1992–1994: K.S.V. Waregem
- 1996–1997: K.S.K. Beveren
- * Club domestic league appearances and goals

Paul Theunis (born 16 March 1952) is a retired Belgium footballer who played as a midfielder.

== Honours ==
KV Mechelen

- European Cup Winners Cup: 1987–88 (winners)
