= 1973–74 Belgian First Division =

71st season of top-tier football in Belgium

Belgian First Division
- Season: 1973–74

Statistics of Belgian First Division in the 1973–74 season.

== Overview ==
It was contested by 16 teams, and R.S.C. Anderlecht won the championship.

== League standings ==
Location of teams in Belgian First Division 1973–74

Pos	Team	Pld	W	D	L	GF	GA	GD	Pts	Qualification
1	R.S.C. Anderlecht	30	17	7	6	72	38	+34	41	Qualified for 1974–75 European Cup
2	Royal Antwerp FC	30	15	9	6	48	33	+15	39	Qualified for 1974–75 UEFA Cup
3	R.W.D. Molenbeek	30	13	13	4	50	25	+25	39	Qualified for 1974–75 UEFA Cup
4	Standard Liège	30	12	10	8	43	30	+13	34	
5	Club Brugge K.V.	30	13	6	11	61	43	+18	32	
6	R.F.C. de Liège	30	10	11	9	42	42	0	31	
7	KV Mechelen	30	10	11	9	34	35	−1	31	
8	Cercle Brugge K.S.V.	30	8	11	11	46	48	−2	27	
9	K.S.V. Waregem	30	8	11	11	38	49	−11	27	Qualified for 1974–75 European Cup Winners' Cup
10	K.S.K. Beveren	30	7	13	10	24	30	−6	27	
11	Beringen FC	30	9	8	13	29	48	−19	26	
12	KFC Diest	30	8	10	12	44	51	−7	26	
13	Beerschot	30	8	10	12	36	47	−11	26	
14	K Berchem Sport	30	7	12	11	33	45	−12	26	
15	Lierse S.K.	30	6	13	11	35	51	−16	25	Qualified for Relegation Play-off
16	K. Sint-Truidense V.V.	30	6	11	13	30	50	−20	23	Qualified for Relegation Play-off

== Results ==
Home \ Away	AND	ANT	BEE	BRC	BER	BEV	CER	CLU	DIE	FCL	LIE	MEC	MOL	STV	STA	WAR
Anderlecht		3–1	6–2	5–1	5–1	1–1	3–1	2–0	2–1	3–0	3–1	2–2	2–2	3–0	3–1	3–1
Antwerp	2–1		3–0	4–2	1–0	0–1	0–0	2–2	2–2	1–0	1–0	0–2	3–2	3–1	2–1	5–2
Beerschot	0–3	1–1		1–0	0–3	1–1	3–1	0–2	4–2	3–0	2–0	1–0	0–2	0–2	2–2	1–1
Berchem	1–4	0–3	0–0		2–0	0–0	0–0	1–0	3–0	0–0	3–3	0–1	3–1	2–1	0–0	0–0
Beringen	3–1	4–1	1–4	0–0		1–1	0–0	2–1	1–0	2–1	0–2	1–2	0–3	1–0	0–0	1–0
Beveren	1–4	0–1	0–0	3–1	0–0		0–0	0–0	3–0	2–2	1–0	0–1	1–0	1–1	2–1	2–1
Cercle Brugge	3–1	1–1	0–2	3–1	2–0	2–0		1–4	1–1	5–0	2–3	2–2	3–2	3–0	1–1	2–2
Club Brugge	2–1	0–4	3–2	2–2	5–0	1–0	3–1		1–0	2–3	3–0	5–2	0–0	7–1	4–2	6–1
Diest	2–3	2–3	1–1	2–2	1–1	2–0	3–4	2–1		2–2	4–1	3–3	0–0	1–0	2–0	3–1
Liège	3–1	2–0	4–2	1–3	3–2	4–2	2–1	2–1	0–1		4–0	0–0	0–3	4–0	1–1	1–1
Lierse	1–1	1–1	0–0	3–2	4–1	0–0	3–2	1–0	1–1	0–0		2–2	1–1	3–3	1–2	1–1
Mechelen	0–0	0–2	0–0	3–1	1–0	2–1	2–2	2–1	1–1	0–0	2–0		0–2	1–2	2–1	0–2
Molenbeek	1–1	5–0	2–2	4–0	1–1	1–1	3–0	3–1	3–0	1–0	1–1	1–0		4–2	0–0	2–2
Sint-Truiden	1–1	1–1	2–0	1–1	1–2	2–0	1–1	1–1	1–2	1–1	1–1	1–1	0–0		1–0	0–2
Standard Liège	1–0	0–0	2–1	0–0	5–0	0–0	2–0	3–1	3–1	2–1	5–0	1–0	0–2	3–1		2–2
Waregem	2–4	0–0	3–1	0–2	1–1	1–0	3–2	2–2	3–2	0–1	2–1	1–0	1–1	0–1	0–2	

Legend: Blue = home team win; Yellow = draw; Red = away team win.

== Play-off ==
Pos	Team	Pld	W	D	L	GF	GA	GD	Pts	Promotion or relegation
1	Lierse S.K.	6	3	3	0	11	3	+8	9	Promoted to Division I
2	KFC Winterslag	6	2	4	0	8	3	+5	8	Promoted to Division I
3	K. Sint-Truidense V.V.	6	2	3	1	7	7	0	7	Relegated to Division II
4	KAS Eupen	6	0	0	6	3	16	−13	0	

== Attendances ==
#	Club	Average
1	Anderlecht	21,933
2	Standard	20,333
3	Club Brugge	17,000
4	Liège	16,933
5	Antwerp	14,967
6	RWDM	12,833
7	Beerschot	12,000
8	STVV	11,567
9	Waregem	10,667
10	Beringen	10,500
11	Beveren	9,867
12	Lierse	9,400
13	Mechelen	8,900
14	Diest	8,233
15	Berchem	7,100
16	Cercle	6,100
