= Lambert Šmíd =

Czech footballer (born 1968)

Personal information
- Date of birth: 9 August 1968 (age 56)
- Place of birth: Brno, Czechoslovakia
- Position(s): Midfielder

Senior career*
Years	Team	Apps	(Gls)
1985–1987	Zbrojovka Brno	12	(0)
1987–1988	Dukla Prague	12	(0)
1988–1989	Hvězda Cheb	20	(4)
1989–1990	Zbrojovka Brno	39	(4)
1991	Sparta Prague	0	(0)
1991	Vítkovice	14	(0)
1992	Drnovice		
1993–1995	Zbrojovka Brno	44	(2)
1995–2001	Beveren	119	(11)
2001–2002	Molenbeek	15	(1)
2002	Dolní Kounice		
- *Club domestic league appearances and goals

Lambert Šmíd (born 9 August 1968) is a Czech former footballer.

== Early life ==
He is the son of a Czech footballer. He joined the youth academy of Czech side FC Zbrojovka Brno at the age of seven.

== Career ==
He started his career with Czech side FC Zbrojovka Brno. In 1987, he signed for Czech side FK Dukla Prague. In 1988, he signed for FK Hvězda Cheb. In 1989, he returned to Zbrojovka Brno. In 1991, he signed for AC Sparta Prague. After that, he signed for MFK Vítkovice. In 1992, he signed for 1. FK Drnovice. In 1993, he returned to Czech side FC Zbrojovka Brno. In 1995, he signed for Belgian side KSK Beveren. He helped the club achieve promotion. In 2001, he signed for RWD Molenbeek. He was described as "one of RWDM's best acquisitions this season". In 2002, he signed for Czech side SK Dolní Kounice. In 2003, he ended his professional career.

== Style of play ==
He mainly operated as a midfielder. He was described as "never been famous for his headless cannonading, he knows how to create chances".

== Personal life ==
He is a native of Brno, Czech Republic. He has been nicknamed "Lambi".
