= Marcel Vercammen =

Belgian footballer (1918–1981)

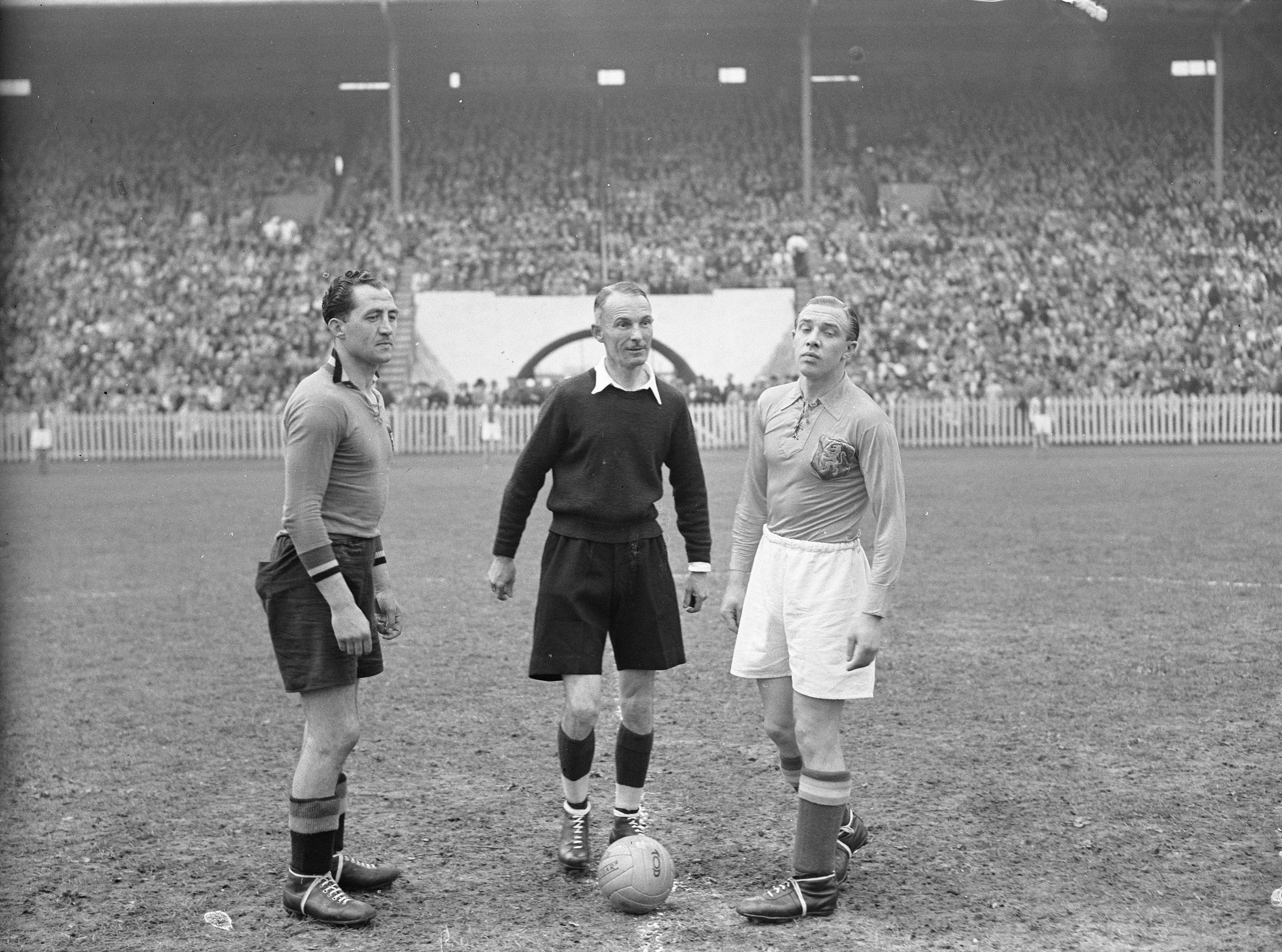
- Marcel Vercammen, John Wiltshire, and Arie de Vroet.

Personal information
- Date of birth: 29 January 1918
- Date of death: 19 May 1981 (aged 63)
- Position: Midfielder

Senior career*
Years	Team	Apps	(Gls)
1936–1950	K. Lyra		
1950–1952	KSV Waregem		

International career
1944–1947	Belgium	7	(0)

Managerial career
- 1950–1954: KSV Waregem
- 1954–1964: KFC Diest
- 1965–1967: Geel
- 1972–1973: Sint-Truiden
- * Club domestic league appearances and goals

Marcel Vercammen (29 January 1918 – 19 May 1981) was a Belgian football player and manager who played as a midfielder. He made seven appearances for the Belgium national team from 1944 to 1947.
