= Sándor Popovics (footballer) =

Dutch-Hungarian footballer and manager (1939–2019)

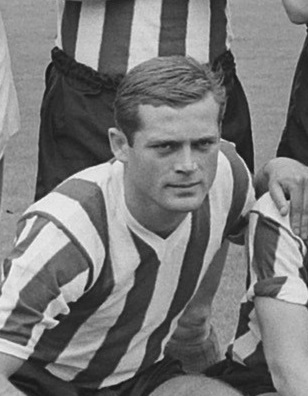
- Popovics with Sparta in 1964

Personal information
- Date of birth: 22 June 1939
- Place of birth: Keszthely, Hungary
- Date of death: 1 July 2019 (aged 80)
- Place of death: Roosendaal, Netherlands
- Position: Striker

Senior career*
Years	Team	Apps	(Gls)
1958–1960	Újpest Dózsa		
1960–1963	Fürth		
1963–1964	Sparta	5	(0)
1964–1966	FC Zaanstreek	32	(3)

Managerial career
- 1970–1971: Quick
- 1971–1972: MVV '27
- 1972–1974: RFC Rotterdam
- 1974–1976: Overmaas
- 1976–1977: Unitas
- 1977–1978: Xerxes
- 1978–1980: Barendrecht
- 1980–1981: SVV
- 1981–1983: Waregem
- 1983–1985: De Graafschap
- 1985–1987: NEC
- 1988–1990: Cambuur
- 1990–1992: Excelsior
- 1993–1994: FC Eindhoven
- 1994: MTK Budapest
- 1995–1998: ADO Den Haag (gen. manager)
- 1999–2000: Verbroedering Geel
- 2002: MTK Budapest
- 2010: RBC
- * Club domestic league appearances and goals

Sándor Popovics (22 June 1939 – 1 July 2019) was a Hungarian-Dutch association football manager and a professional footballer in the position of forward.

== Playing career ==
=== Club ===
As a footballer he played for Újpest Dózsa (1958–1960). When in 1960 he played a game in Austria, he defected from Soviet Union-oppressed Hungary. He continued his football career in Germany at SpVgg Fürth (1960–1963) and later moved to Holland to play for Sparta (1963–64), and FC Zaanstreek (1964–1966).

== Managerial career ==
After retiring form playing, Popovics coached Dutch amateur clubs Quick (1970–1971), MVV '27 (1971–1972), RFC Rotterdam (1972–1974), Overmaas (1974-1976), Unitas (1976–1977), Xerxes (1977–1978) and Barendrecht (1978–1980). The first professional team he managed was SVV Schiedam (1980–1981), then Belgian side KSV Waregem (1981–83). Back in the Netherlands he continued coaching professional teams De Graafschap (1983–1985), NEC Nijmegen (1985–1987), Cambuur (1988–1990), Excelsior Rotterdam (1990–1992), FC Eindhoven (1993–1994) and RBC Roosendaal (July 2010). At Roosendaal he left after six days as the club tried to have his unlicensed deputies do the main work. He also managed Hungarian club MTK Budapest twice and Belgian side Verbroedering Geel, succeeding Dimitri Mbuyu.

Sándor Popovics held the position of general manager at ADO Den Haag and was named head scout at NAC in February 2002

== Personal life ==
He became a naturalized Dutch citizen in 1970. Popovics was married to Corrie, the ex-wife of Theo Laseroms, and was father-in-law of former NEC Nijmegen and Hungary goalkeeper Gábor Babos. He suffered from Alzheimer's disease and died on 1 July 2019.
