= René Verheyen =

Belgian footballer

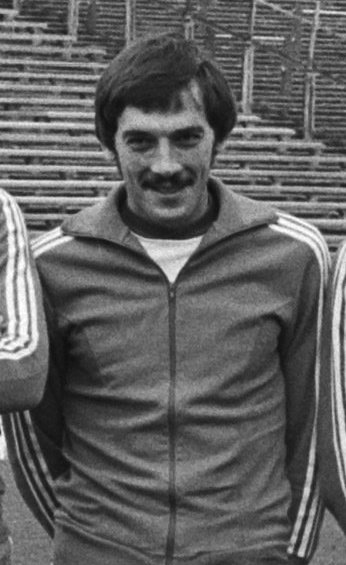
- Verheyen with Belgium in 1977

Personal information
- Date of birth: 20 March 1952 (age 74)
- Place of birth: Beerse, Belgium
- Height: 1.86 m (6 ft 1 in)
- Position: Midfielder

Team information
- Current team: Deinze (manager)

Youth career
- Lentezon Beerse

Senior career*
Years	Team	Apps	(Gls)
1971–1974	Turnhout		
1974–1983	Lokeren	300	(60)
1983–1987	Club Brugge	127	(20)
1987–1988	AA Gent		
1988–1990	White Star Lauwe		

International career
1976–1984	Belgium	24	(3)

Managerial career
- 1989–1990: White Star Lauwe
- 1990–1992: K.S.V. Waregem
- 1992–1999: Club Brugge KV (assistant)
- 1999–2000: Club Brugge KV
- 2000–2006: Club Brugge KV (assistant)
- 2007–2009: K.M.S.K. Deinze
- * Club domestic league appearances and goals

René Verheyen (born 20 March 1952) is a retired Belgian football midfielder.

== Club career ==
During his active career he played for Lokeren (1974–1982), Club Brugge (1983–1987) and K.A.A. Gent (1987–1988). He has since his retirement worked as a manager, most notably for Club Brugge between 1999 and 2000. He is currently managing K.M.S.K. Deinze.

== International career ==
Verheyen was a member of the Belgian team that finished second in the 1980 UEFA European Championship, and also participated in the 1982 FIFA World Cup and the 1984 UEFA European Championship.

== Honours ==
=== Player ===
==== KSC Lokeren ====
- Belgian Cup: 1980–81 (runners-up)

Club Brugge

- Belgian Cup: 1985–86
- Belgian Supercup: 1986
- Bruges Matins: 1984

=== International ===
Belgium

- UEFA European Championship: 1980 (runners-up)
- Belgian Sports Merit Award: 1980

=== Individual ===
- Man of the Season (Belgian First Division): 1976-77, 1983–84
