= Luc Millecamps =

Belgian footballer

Personal information
- Date of birth: 10 September 1951 (age 75)
- Place of birth: Waregem, Belgium
- Height: 1.83 m (6 ft 0 in)
- Position: Defender

Senior career*
Years	Team	Apps	(Gls)
1969–1986	K.S.V. Waregem	345	(17)

International career
1979–1983	Belgium	35	(0)
- * Club domestic league appearances and goals

Luc Millecamps (born 10 September 1951) is a Belgian retired footballer who played as a defender. Born in Waregem, he played for K.S.V. Waregem his whole professional career. He earned 35 caps for the Belgium national team, and participated in UEFA Euro 1980 and the 1982 FIFA World Cup.

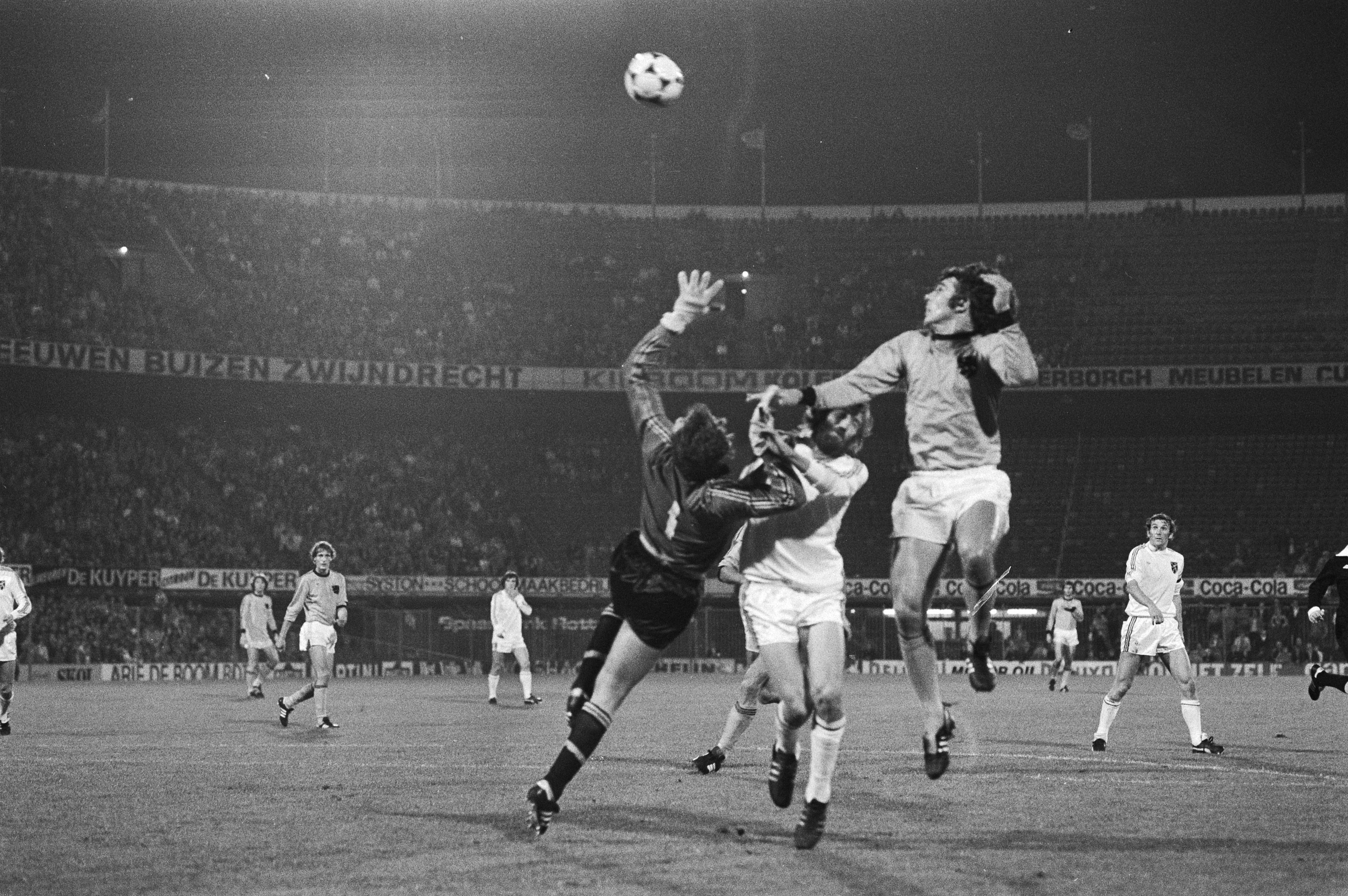
Millecamps between Pfaff and Van Hanegem during a friendly game Netherlands–Belgium in 1979.

He is the brother of fellow ex-footballer Marc Millecamps.

== Career statistics ==
Appearances and goals by national team and year
National team	Year	Apps	Goals
Belgium	1979	5	0
Belgium	1980	11	0
Belgium	1981	5	0
Belgium	1982	8	0
Belgium	1983	6	0
Total		35	0

== Honours ==
KSV Waregem

- Belgian Cup: 1973–74; runner-up 1981–82
- Belgian Super Cup: 1982
- UEFA Cup: 1985–86 (semi-finals)
- Tournoi de Paris: 1985

Belgium

- UEFA European Championship: runner-up 1980
- Belgian Sports Merit Award: 1980

Individual

- Onze Mondial: 1981
