= KV Kortrijk =

Belgian professional football club

- Full name: Koninklijke Voetbalclub Kortrijk
- Nickname: De Kerels (The Guys)
- Founded: 1901; 125 years ago
- Ground: Guldensporenstadion, Kortrijk
- Capacity: 9,399
- Owner: Vincent Tan
- Chairman: Ken Choo
- Head coach: Christophe Lepoint (caretaker)
- League: Belgian Pro League
- 2025–26: Challenger Pro League, 2nd of 17 (promoted)
- Website: kvk.be
| Home colours | Away colours | Third colours |

Koninklijke Voetbalclub Kortrijk (often simply called KV Kortrijk or KVK) is a Belgian professional football club based in Kortrijk, West Flanders. They play in the Belgian Pro League and they achieved their best ranking ever during the 2009–10 season, finishing fourth after the play-offs. KV Kortrijk was founded in 1971, though their roots can be traced to 1901. They are registered to the Royal Belgian Football Association with matricule number 19. The club colours are red and white. They play their home matches at the Guldensporenstadion, named after the Battle of the Golden Spurs which took place in Kortrijk in 1302.

KV Kortrijk first entered the first division in the early 20th century, between 1906–07 and 1910–11. They eventually had to wait 65 years to return at the highest level, when they spent 15 seasons at the top flight, interrupted by a season in the second division (between 1976–77 and 1978–79 and between 1980–81 and 1991–92). KV Kortrijk also played the 1998–99 season in the first division before they returned to the Belgian Pro League in the 2008–09 season.

== History ==
In 1901 SC Courtraisien was founded. The club merged with FC Courtraisien in 1918. They received in 1951 the name Koninklijke Kortrijk Sport. They had the matricule n°19 like the oldest club SC Courtraisien. Stade Kortrijk was founded in 1923 with matricule n°161. Because Stade Kortrijk and Koninklijke Kortrijk Sport didn't play well anymore, they merged in 1971. They could play with matricule n°19 and the new name was KV Kortrijk.

Early 2000's KV Kortrijk dropped to the third division. In 2001 they went bankrupt but managed to finish the season. They even won the third division playoffs but the club did not promote to the second division as they were penalized for the bankruptcy. In 2004 KV Kortrijk promoted to the second division, and in the 2007–08 season they managed to get promoted to the first division.

KV Kortrijk was bought for €5 million by Malaysian businessman Vincent Tan on 12 May 2015.

On 4 May 2025, Kortrijk secure relegation to Challenger Pro League from next season after winning from Cercle Brugge 0–2 in Relegation round because Beerschot couldn't defeat STVV. This way they ended 17 years in top tier.

On 11 April 2026 they secured promotion from second division and returned back to the Belgian Pro League. They are the only club to achieve immediate promotion after relegation since KV Mechelen in 2019.

== Honours ==
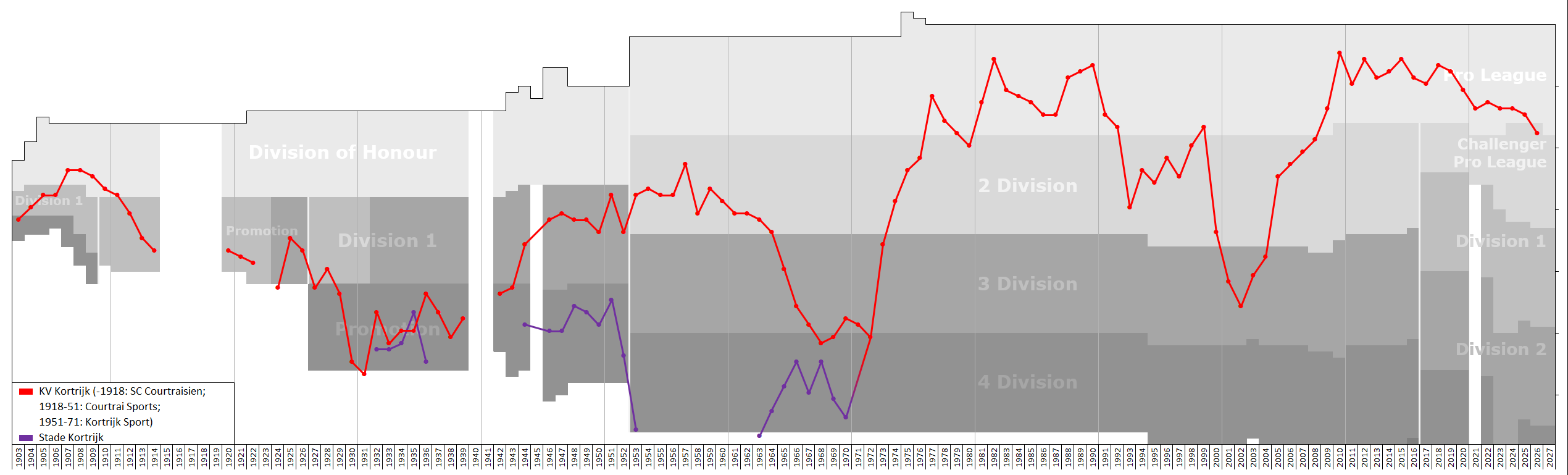
Historical chart of KV Kortrijk league performance

- Belgian Cup
  - Runners-up (1): 2011–12
- Belgian Second Division
  - Winners (2): 1905–06, 2007–08
  - Runners-up (2): 1979–80, 1997–98
- Belgian Second Division final round
  - Winners (3): 1976, 1980, 1998

== Colours and badge ==
KV Kortrijk's colours are generally red and white. The home kit is usually all red with white trim and red shorts. The away kit is similar, except in blue. The club's logo is a white shield, split into thirds by a red upside-down, V-like shape, and the letters "KVK" are split into each third, in a red font. On top of the shield is a crown.

== Stadium ==
KV Kortrijk plays their home matches at the Guldensporen Stadion. It is located in Kortrijk, Belgium, and the current capacity of the ground is 9,399. In the summer of 2008, the ground's capacity was increased from 6,896 to 9,399, after Kortrijk's elevation into the Belgian First Division. Guldensporenstadion literally means "Stadium of the Golden Spurs". The stadium is named after this in reference to the Battle of the Golden Spurs which, in 1302, was fought in Kortrijk. The stadium has a traditional local stadium look about it and is single-tiered all around the ground.

== Current squad ==
As of 4 September 2026

Note: Flags indicate national team as defined under FIFA eligibility rules; some limited exceptions apply. Players may hold more than one non-FIFA nationality.

| No. | Pos. | Nation | Player |
|---|---|---|---|
| 1 | GK | ISL | Patrik Gunnarsson |
| 3 | DF | SCO | Matthew Anderson |
| 4 | DF | ENG | Harrison Murray-Campbell (on loan from Chelsea) |
| 5 | DF | CMR | James Ndjeungoue |
| 6 | MF | BEL | Liam De Smet |
| 7 | FW | ISR | Suf Podgoreanu |
| 8 | MF | CHI | Nayel Mehssatou |
| 10 | FW | CAF | Goduine Koyalipou (on loan from Lens) |
| 11 | FW | RSA | Shandre Campbell |
| 13 | GK | BEL | Ebbe De Vlaeminck |
| 14 | FW | BEL | Lenn De Smet |
| 15 | DF | CIV | Mohamed Fofana |
| 17 | MF | SLO | Rok Štorman (on loan from Karviná) |
| 18 | FW | BEL | Jellert Van Landschoot |

| No. | Pos. | Nation | Player |
|---|---|---|---|
| 19 | MF | BEL | Brecht Dejaegere |
| 20 | DF | BEL | Gilles Dewaele |
| 21 | DF | FRA | Axel Drouhin |
| 22 | DF | BEL | Gilles Ruyssen |
| 24 | MF | SWE | Jamie Roche |
| 25 | DF | BEL | Basile Vroninks |
| 31 | GK | SRB | Marko Ilić |
| 35 | MF | BEL | Boris Lambert |
| 36 | DF | FRA | Rudy Kohon |
| 68 | FW | GLP | Thierry Ambrose |
| 70 | FW | BEL | Anthony Philips |
| 71 | MF | JPN | Ken Masui (on loan from Nagoya Grampus) |
| 90 | FW | NGR | Sixtus Ogbuehi |

=== Out on loan ===
Note: Flags indicate national team as defined under FIFA eligibility rules; some limited exceptions apply. Players may hold more than one non-FIFA nationality.

| No. / Pos. / Nation / Player; — / FW / MAD / Bryan Adinany (at Debrecen until 30 June 2027) | No. / Pos. / Nation / Player; — / FW / BEL / Kyan Himpe (at Lierse until 30 June 2027) |

== Coaching staff ==
| Position | Staff |
|---|---|
| Head coach | (Belgium) Michiel Jonckheere |
| Assistant Coach | (Belgium) Kurt Bataille (Belgium) Christophe Lepoint |
| Goalkeeper Coach | (Belgium) Franky Vandendriessche |
| Head of Performance | (Belgium) Pieter Jacobs |
| Video Analyst | (Belgium) Gregory De Grauwe |
| Team Manager | (Belgium) Claude Gezelle |

== Managers ==
- (Belgium) André Van Maldeghem & Luc Maddens (1971–73)
- (Belgium) André Van Maldeghem & Walter Maes (1973–75)
- (Belgium) Georges Heylens (1975–77)
- (Socialist Federal Republic of Yugoslavia) Marijan Brnčić (1978–79)
- (Belgium) Raymond Mertens (1979)
- (Netherlands) Henk Houwaart (1979–83)
- (Netherlands) Wim Reijers (1983–84)
- (Belgium) André Van Maldeghem (1984–85)
- (Belgium) Dimitri Davidović (1985–86)
- (Netherlands) Aad Koudijzer (1986)
- (Netherlands) Han Grijzenhout (1986–87)
- (Belgium) Eddy Kinsabil (1987–88)
- (Belgium) Georges Leekens (1988–89)
- (Netherlands) Henk Houwaart (1989–90)
- (Belgium) René Desayere (1990–91)
- (Belgium) Boudewijn Braem (1991–92)
- (Netherlands) Johan Boskamp (1992 – January 1993)
- (Belgium) James Storme (1993–94)
- (Belgium) Patrick Van Geem (1994–95)
- (Belgium) Regi Van Acker (1995–98)
- (Belgium) Michel De Wolf (1998–99)
- (Belgium) Luc Vanderschommen (1999 – September 1999)
- (Belgium) Eddy Kinsabil (2000)
- (Belgium) Gerrit Laverge (2000–01)
- (Belgium) Boudewijn Braem (2001–02)
- (Belgium) Francky Dekenne (2002–03)
- (Belgium) Boudewijn Braem (2003 – February 2003)
- (Netherlands) Angelo Nijskens (2003 – January 2004)
- (Belgium) Manu Ferrera (1 July 2003 – 2004)
- (Belgium) Rudi Verkempinck (September 2004 – 2005)
- (Belgium) Manu Ferrera (2005 – 29 January 2006)
- (Belgium) Hein Vanhaezebrouck (1 July 2006 – 30 June 2009)
- (Belgium) Georges Leekens (1 July 2009 – 11 May 2010)
- (Belgium) Hein Vanhaezebrouck (6 June 2010 – 30 June 2014)
- (Belgium) Yves Vanderhaeghe (2014–15)
- (Belgium) Johan Walem (2015–2016)
- (France) Karim Belhocine (2016)
- (Belgium) Patrick De Wilde (2016)
- (France) Karim Belhocine (2016)
- (Belgium) Bart Van Lancker (2016–2017)
- (France) Karim Belhocine (2017)
- (Greece) Yannis Anastasiou (2017)
- (Belgium) Glen De Boeck (2017–2018)
- (Belgium) Yves Vanderhaeghe (2018–2021)
- (Slovenia) Luka Elsner (2021)
- (France) Karim Belhocine (2021–2022)
- (Bosnia and Herzegovina) Adnan Čustović (2022)
- (Germany) Bernd Storck (2022–2023)
- (Belgium) Edward Still (2023)
- (Belgium) Glen De Boeck (2023)
- (Iceland) Freyr Alexandersson (2024)
- (Belgium) Yves Vanderhaeghe (2024–2025)
- (Germany) Bernd Storck (2025)
