= Urbain Braems =

Belgian football player and manager (1933–2021)

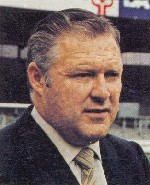

Personal information
- Date of birth: 10 November 1933
- Place of birth: Zottegem, Belgium
- Date of death: 9 September 2021 (aged 87)
- Place of death: Zottegem, Belgium
- Position: Forward

Senior career*
Years	Team	Apps	(Gls)
1950–1955	K.S.V. Sottegem		
1955–1956	Racing Mechelen	27	(6)
1956–1957	Club Brugge	29	(13)
1957–1960	Daring Club Bruxelles	33	(12)
1960–1962	KSK Halle		
Total		89	(31)

Managerial career
- 1967–1972: Cercle Brugge
- 1972–1973: Royal Antwerp
- 1973–1975: Anderlecht
- 1975–1978: Beveren
- 1978–1979: Lokeren
- 1979–1981: Anderlecht
- 1981–1985: Beveren
- 1985–1988: Panionios
- 1988–1989: Standard de Liège
- 1989–1992: Trabzonspor
- * Club domestic league appearances and goals

Urbain Braems (10 November 1933 – 9 September 2021) was a Belgian football player and manager.

He played for K.S.V. Sottegem, K.R.C. Mechelen, Club Brugge and Daring Club Bruxelles.

He managed Cercle Brugge, Royal Antwerp, Anderlecht, Beveren, Lokeren, Standard de Liège, Panionios and Trabzonspor.

Urbain Braems became Belgian national champion with Anderlecht in 1974 and with Beveren in 1984. In 1989, he moved to Trabzonspor together with his former Beveren goalkeeper Jean-Marie Pfaff. Braems ended his managerial career in 1992, after winning the Turkish Cup with the club.

Urbain Braems died in his hometown Zottegem in 2021, aged 87.

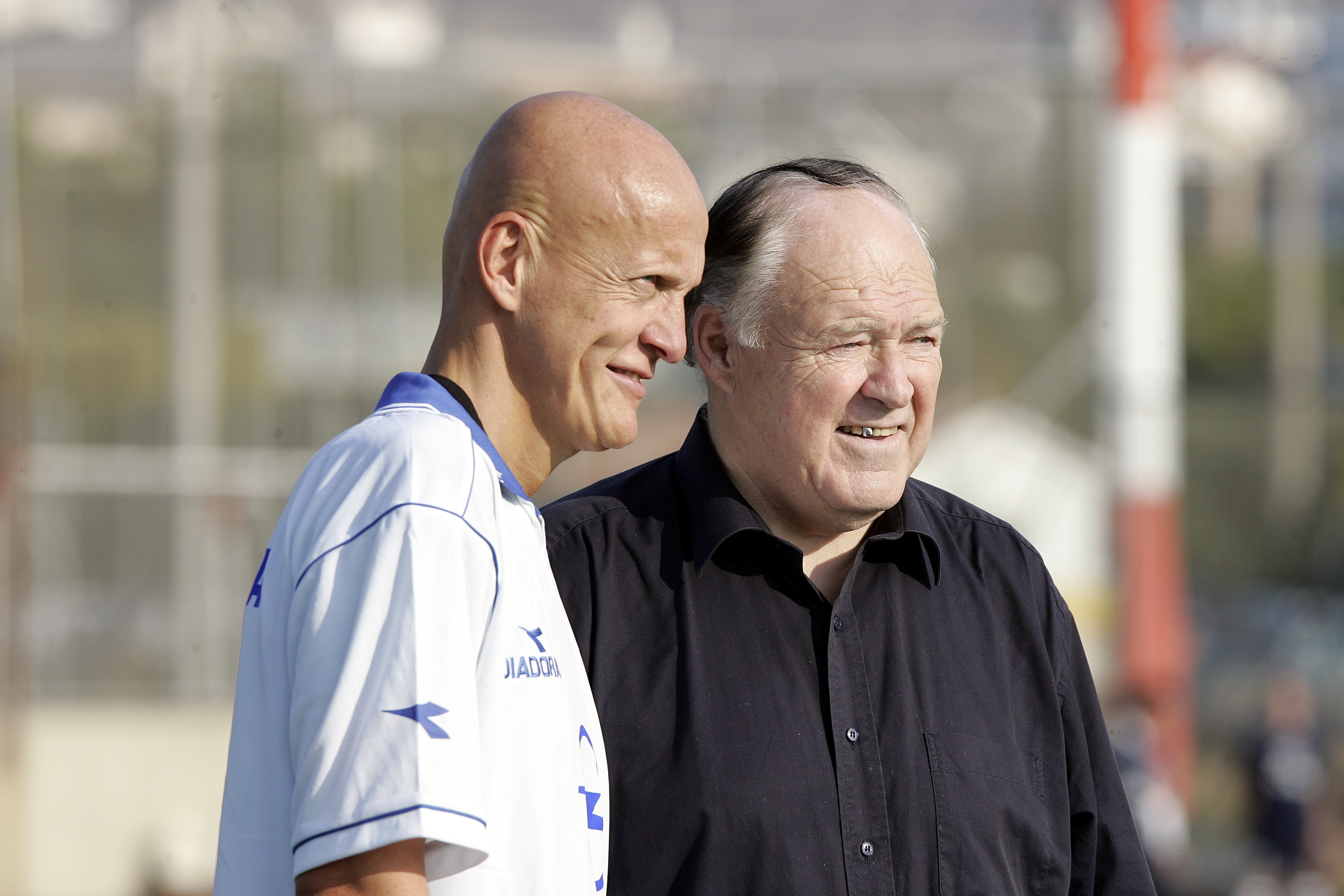
Pierluigi Collina with Braems, circa 2010

== Honours ==
=== Manager ===
Cercle Brugge

- Belgian Second Division: 1970–71

Anderlecht

- Belgian First Division: 1973–74
- Belgian Cup: 1974–75

Beveren

- Belgian First Division: 1983–84
- Belgian Cup: 1977–78, 1982–83
- Belgian Supercup: 1984

Panionios

- Balkans Cup runner-up: 1986

Trabzonspor

- Turkish Cup: 1991–92

Individual

- Honorary Citizen of Zottegem, Belgium: 1987
- Knight in the Order of Sotto: 1987
- Honorary Citizen of Trabzon, Turkey: 2007
