= Guy Thys =

Belgian footballer and manager (1922–2003)

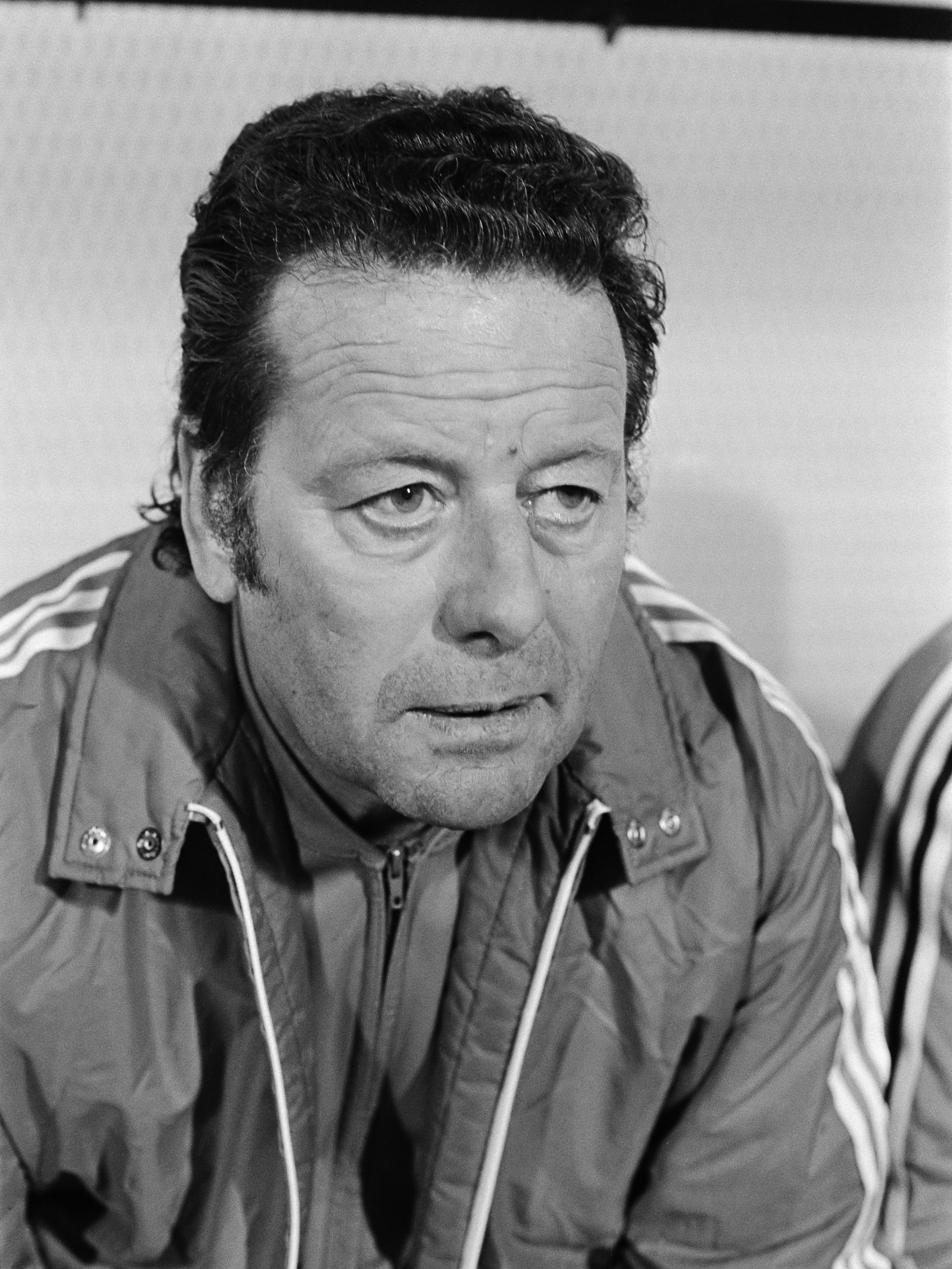
- Guy Thys pictured in 1976

Personal information
- Full name: Guy Jean Léonard Thys
- Date of birth: 6 December 1922
- Place of birth: Antwerp, Belgium
- Date of death: 1 August 2003 (aged 80)
- Place of death: Antwerp, Belgium
- Height: 1.82 m (6 ft 0 in)
- Position: Forward

Youth career
- 1934–1939: Beerschot

Senior career*
Years	Team	Apps	(Gls)
1939–1950	Beerschot	143	(60)
1942–1943	→ Daring Bruxelles (loan)	26	(12)
1950–1954	Standard Liège	104	(46)
1954–1958	Cercle Brugge	107	(41)
Total		380	(159)

International career
1952–1953	Belgium	2	(0)

Managerial career
- 1954–1958: Cercle Brugge
- 1958–1959: Lokeren
- 1960–1963: Wezel Sport
- 1963–1966: Herentals
- 1966–1969: Beveren
- 1969–1973: Union Saint-Gilloise
- 1973–1976: Royal Antwerp
- 1976–1989: Belgium
- 1990–1991: Belgium
Medal record
Men's football
Representing Belgium (as manager)
UEFA European Championship
Runner-up	1980
- * Club domestic league appearances and goals

Guy Jean-Leonard Thys (6 December 1922 – 1 August 2003) was a Belgian football manager, mostly known for being the most successful manager in the history of the Belgium national football team as he managed to lead the national side to their only UEFA European Championship final in 1980 and a fourth–place finish at the 1986 FIFA World Cup. With 114 games between 1976 and 1991, he is the longest-serving national coach in the history of the Red Devils to date.

== Career ==
=== Playing career ===
Thys was born in Antwerp as son of Belgian international Ivan Thys. He started his career in the 1940s and 50s as a football player with Beerschot, Daring Molenbeek and Standard. Because of the war, nearly five years of his career were lost. In 1952 and 1953 he played two matches with the Red Devils, the Belgium national team.

=== Manager career ===
He combined the activities of player and trainer for Cercle Brugge from 1954 until 1958. In 1959 he performed the same functions for Racing Lokeren. He became a full-time trainer with Wezel the same year, followed by Herentals, Beveren, Union Sint-Gillis, and Antwerp. Under Thys' leadership Antwerp was a finalist in the Belgian Cup and twice finished second in the championship.

=== International management ===
Thys was appointed Belgium manager in 1976 and remained in the job until 1989, managing the team for 101 games, 45 of which were victories.

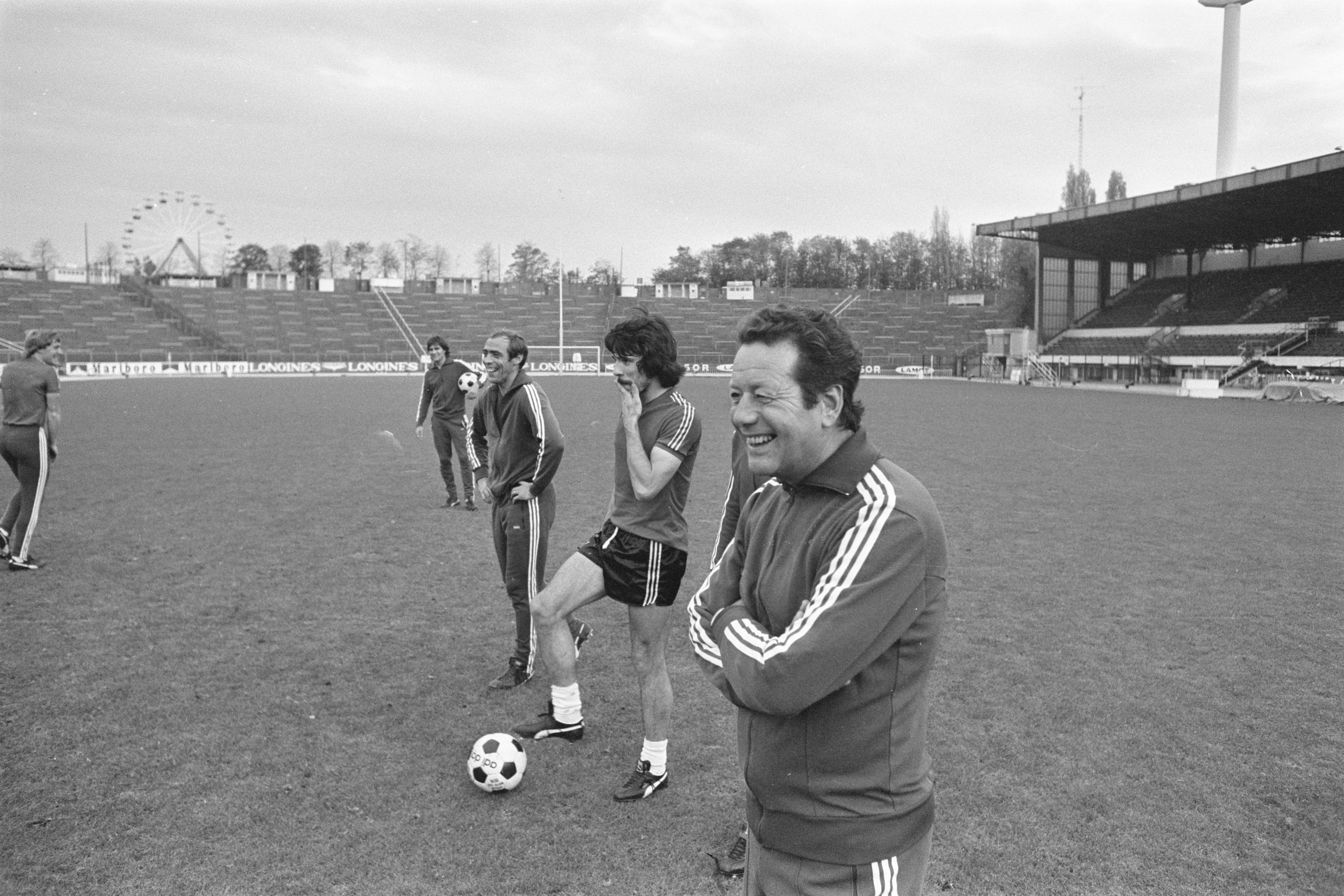
Thys during a training of the Belgian national team, October 1977

Under his lead the Red Devils participated twice in the European Championship, and three times at the World Cup. In 1980, Belgium narrowly lost the European Championship final to Germany in Rome. In the opening game of the 1982 World Cup, Belgium surprised the world by beating the reigning world champions Argentina 1–0. In 1986 Belgium finished fourth in the World Cup in Mexico. His team beat Spain and the Soviet Union, but was defeated by Diego Maradona and his Argentine team in the semi-finals.

Walter Meeuws succeeded as coach in 1989 him and Thys became a kind of technical director. However, Meeuws was fired after one defeat and two ties. Eight months after stepping down as manager Thys was re-appointed in early 1990 in order to take charge of the team for the 1990 World Cup. The side duly qualified through the group stage and was knocked out by the England national team in the second round of the tournament. Thys retired again in 1991.

== Death ==
Guy Thys died on 1 August 2003.

== Honours ==
=== Player ===
Standard Liège

- Belgian Cup: 1953–54

=== Player/Manager ===
==== Cercle Brugge ====
- Belgian Third Division: 1955–56

=== Manager ===
Beveren

- Belgian Second Division: 1966–67

Royal Antwerp

- Belgian First Division Runner-up: 1973–74, 1974–75
- Belgian Cup Runner-up: 1974–75

=== International ===
Belgium

- UEFA European Championship: 1980 (runners-up)
- FIFA World Cup: 1986 (fourth place)
- Belgian Sports Merit Award: 1980

=== Individual ===
- World Soccer Magazine Manager of the Year: 1986
- Coach of the Platina 11 (Best Team of 50 Years Golden Shoe Winners): 2003
- Guy Thys Awards: From 2011
- RBFA 125 Years Icons Team Coach: 2020

== See also ==
- National team managers with 100 or more matches

Sporting positions
Preceded by (Belgium) Jozef Vandercruyssen	Cercle Brugge top scorer 1955	Succeeded by (Belgium) François Loos
Preceded by (Belgium) François Loos	Cercle Brugge top scorer alongside François Loos; 1957	Succeeded by (Belgium) André Perot
