= Raymond Mommens =

Belgian footballer

Personal information
- Full name: Raymond Mommens
- Date of birth: 27 December 1958 (age 67)
- Place of birth: Lebbeke, Belgium
- Height: 1.78 m (5 ft 10 in)
- Positions: Left winger; striker

Youth career
- SK Lebbeke

Senior career*
Years	Team	Apps	(Gls)
1975–1986	Lokeren	306	(59)
1986–1997	Charleroi	310	(19)
Total		616	(78)

International career
1977–1988	Belgium	18	(0)

Managerial career
- 1999–2000: Charleroi
- * Club domestic league appearances and goals

Raymond Mommens (born 27 December 1958) is a former Belgian international footballer who played as a left winger or striker).

He is currently managing the Talents Detection Department at the R. Charleroi S.C.

== Club career ==
As a player his club teams were Lokeren and Charleroi.

== International career ==
He made his debut for the Belgium national football team during the qualifying rounds of the 1978 FIFA World Cup. He was included in the squads for the 1982 and 1986 World Cups, and the European Championships in 1980 and 1984.

== Honours ==
Lokeren

- Belgian First Division: 1980–81 (runners-up)
- Belgian Cup: 1980–81 (runners-up)
- Bruges Matins: 1982

Charleroi

- Belgian Cup: 1992–93 (runners-up)

Belgium

- UEFA European Championship: 1980 (runners-up)
- FIFA World Cup: 1986 (fourth place)
- Belgian Sports Merit Award: 1980
