= 1980–81 Belgian First Division =

78th season of top-tier football in Belgium

Belgian First Division
- Season: 1980–81

Statistics of Belgian First Division in the 1980–81 season.

== Overview ==
Location of teams in Belgian First Division 1980–81

It was contested by 18 teams, and Anderlecht won the championship.

== League standings ==
Pos	Team	Pld	W	D	L	GF	GA	GD	Pts	Qualification or relegation
1	Anderlecht	34	26	5	3	83	24	+59	57	Qualified for 1981–82 European Cup
2	Lokeren	34	20	6	8	74	36	+38	46	Qualified for 1981–82 UEFA Cup
3	Standard Liège	34	18	6	10	65	45	+20	42	Qualified for 1981–82 European Cup Winners' Cup
4	Beveren	34	16	9	9	48	31	+17	41	Qualified for 1981–82 UEFA Cup
5	FC Winterslag	34	16	6	12	46	43	+3	38	Qualified for 1981–82 UEFA Cup
6	Club Brugge	34	16	5	13	74	56	+18	37	Qualified for 1981–82 UEFA Cup
7	R.W.D. Molenbeek	34	14	7	13	49	50	−1	35	
8	Lierse	34	12	11	11	58	49	+9	35	
9	Royal Antwerp	34	11	11	12	42	53	−11	33	
10	Gent	34	12	8	14	49	49	0	32	
11	Waregem	34	11	10	13	40	47	−7	32	
12	Liège	34	11	9	14	53	44	+9	31	
13	K.V. Kortrijk	34	11	8	15	42	55	−13	30	
14	Cercle Brugge	34	11	7	16	51	68	−17	29	
15	Beerschot	34	10	6	18	42	55	−13	26	
16	Waterschei Thor	34	10	5	19	54	77	−23	25	
17	Beringen	34	8	8	18	35	62	−27	24	Relegated to Division II
18	K. Berchem Sport	34	5	9	20	29	90	−61	19	Relegated to Division II

== Results ==
Home \ Away	AND	ANT	BEE	BRC	BER	BEV	CER	CLU	GNT	KOR	FCL	LIE	LOK	MOL	STA	WAR	WTG	WIN
Anderlecht		5–1	8–2	4–1	2–1	2–0	2–1	1–0	2–0	6–0	1–0	6–2	3–1	4–0	1–1	4–0	4–1	2–0
Antwerp	0–3		3–2	0–1	2–2	2–2	2–1	1–2	2–2	1–0	2–0	0–0	0–1	0–2	5–1	0–0	2–0	1–1
Beerschot	0–1	0–1		0–2	2–2	1–0	2–3	4–1	1–0	2–0	2–1	1–1	0–2	1–0	0–2	3–0	2–0	1–2
Berchem	0–2	1–1	2–6		0–4	1–1	0–2	1–1	0–0	1–1	3–1	1–6	1–1	1–3	3–0	1–1	2–2	0–0
Beringen	2–1	0–0	1–0	0–1		0–0	2–1	1–3	1–0	1–1	1–1	0–3	0–1	1–1	2–2	3–1	0–1	4–2
Beveren	4–1	1–1	1–0	2–0	2–1		2–1	3–2	5–0	1–1	0–1	3–0	1–1	3–0	2–0	3–1	2–0	0–2
Cercle Brugge	0–2	0–0	3–2	1–0	3–1	1–1		1–2	1–1	1–3	2–3	2–1	1–1	4–2	3–0	2–1	2–3	0–1
Club Brugge	1–5	5–1	4–0	4–0	2–0	3–0	8–1		2–0	2–0	4–3	3–1	3–2	3–1	1–7	2–0	7–3	1–2
Gent	0–1	1–1	1–1	3–0	4–0	1–0	2–0	0–0		6–0	3–1	1–1	1–4	2–1	2–1	1–1	6–3	3–0
Kortrijk	0–1	0–0	0–0	3–0	2–0	0–1	1–4	1–0	4–2		0–1	3–1	4–2	0–3	1–4	3–1	1–1	0–1
Liège	1–1	4–0	0–1	6–0	5–1	0–1	2–2	1–0	3–4	1–3		0–2	0–0	1–0	2–2	0–0	3–0	5–0
Lierse	0–2	1–0	4–3	6–2	5–0	2–2	1–1	1–1	3–2	2–0	1–1		1–2	2–2	0–1	1–1	2–0	2–0
Lokeren	2–0	1–4	0–0	10–1	2–0	2–0	5–0	3–1	1–0	5–1	1–0	1–0		5–3	2–0	4–0	5–1	4–1
Molenbeek	0–0	2–1	1–1	3–1	0–1	1–1	2–2	2–2	1–0	1–0	2–1	2–1	3–1		2–0	0–1	3–2	1–0
Standard Liège	0–1	5–1	3–0	7–1	3–0	1–1	3–0	2–1	0–1	1–1	1–1	2–0	2–1	3–2		2–1	3–2	1–0
Waregem	0–0	4–0	2–0	3–0	2–1	0–2	3–2	2–1	3–0	0–0	1–1	1–1	1–0	2–0	2–3		2–0	1–1
Waterschei Thor	2–4	2–3	2–1	4–0	5–1	1–0	5–2	2–2	2–0	0–5	0–2	3–4	1–1	0–2	1–2	3–1		1–1
Winterslag	1–1	1–3	2–1	2–1	2–1	1–2	3–0	2–0	3–0	2–3	3–1	0–0	2–0	3–1	2–0	3–1	0–1	

Legend: Blue = home team win; Yellow = draw; Red = away team win.

== Attendances ==
#	Club	Average
1	Anderlecht	23,565
2	Standard	17,765
3	Club Brugge	16,588
4	Gent	14,647
5	Beveren	11,206
6	Lierse	9,882
7	Waterschei	9,441
8	Liège	9,059
9	RWDM	9,029
10	Antwerp	9,000
11	Lokeren	8,500
12	Winterslag	7,618
13	Beringen	7,353
14	Waregem	6,882
15	Kortrijk	6,676
16	Beerschot	6,529
17	Cercle	5,824
18	Berchem	5,435
