= Hans Croon =

Dutch football manager (1936–1985)

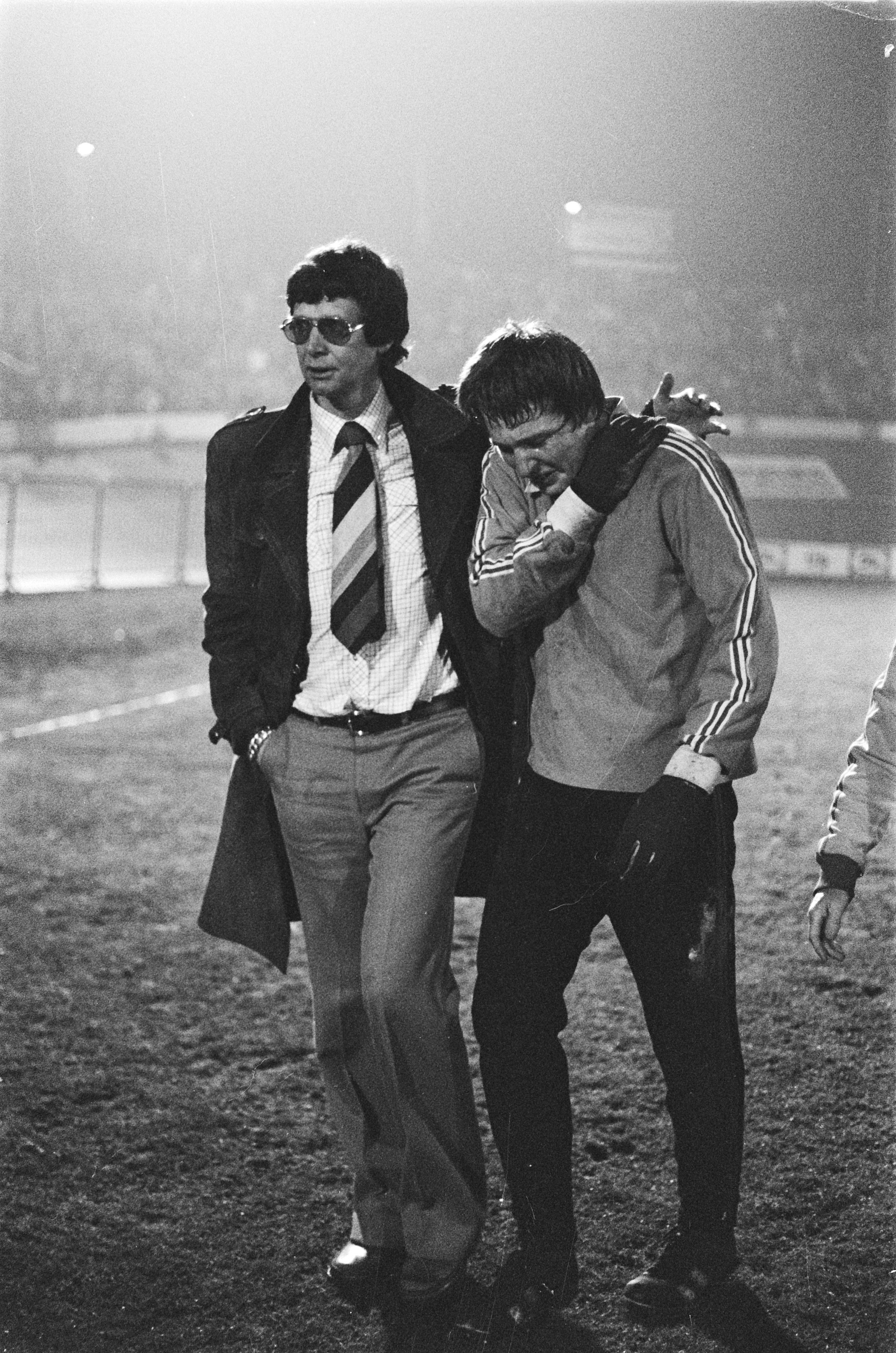

Personal information
- Date of birth: 25 May 1936
- Place of birth: Malang, Dutch East Indies
- Date of death: 5 February 1985 (aged 48)
- Place of death: Rotterdam, Netherlands

Managerial career
- Years: Team
- 1957–1959: DWS
- 1959–1964: SVV
- 1964–1969: HVC
- 1969–1972: FC Volendam
- 1972–1974: Waregem
- 1974–1975: Lierse S.K.
- 1975–1976: Anderlecht
- 1976–1978: NEC
- 1978: FC VVV
- 1979–1981: Waregem
- 1981–1982: Beringen
- 1982–1983: Lierse S.K.

Hans Croon (25 May 1936 – 5 February 1985) was a Dutch football manager who won the 1976 UEFA Cup Winners' Cup Final with Anderlecht.

== Managerial career ==
As well as Anderlecht, Croon coached in the Netherlands and Belgium with DWS, VER, HVC, FC Volendam, K.S.V. Waregem, Lierse S.K. and NEC.

His Anderlecht side won the 1976 UEFA Cup Winners' Cup with a 4–2 victory over West Ham United on 5 May 1976 at Heysel Stadium in Brussels. He also won the Belgian Cup in 1976 with Anderlecht. He left Belgium and moved to NEC, and coached the team until 1978. He later succeeded compatriot Kees Rijvers at Beringen, with whom he suffered relegation from the Eerste Klasse.

In 1995, it was reported that Croon was persuading players to take drugs during his short tenure at FC VVV. Then VVV player Mikan Jovanović confirmed the report, stating he was one of three players to take performance-enhancing pills.

== Personal life ==
After retiring from football, Croon joined the Bhagwan movement and named himself Shunyam Avyakul. He died in February 1985 in a Rotterdam hospital at the age of 48 following a car crash near Arnemuiden a week earlier.

== Honours ==
=== Manager ===
==== SV Waregem ====
- Belgian Cup: 1973-74

RSC Anderlecht

- Belgian Cup: 1975-76
- European Cup Winners' Cup: 1975–76 (winners)
