= Dimitri Mbuyu =

Belgian footballer

Personal information
- Full name: Dimitri Mbuyu
- Date of birth: 31 October 1964 (age 62)
- Place of birth: Berchem, Belgium
- Height: 1.78 m (5 ft 10 in)
- Position: Striker

Youth career
- Lokeren

Senior career*
Years	Team	Apps	(Gls)
1983–1987	Lokeren	98	(34)
1987–1988	Standard Liège	26	(12)
1988–1989	Club Brugge	26	(11)
1989–1990	Waregem	20	(2)
1990–1991	FC Antwerp	3	(0)
1991–1992	→ PAOK (loan)		
1992–1994	Verbroedering Geel	54	(14)
1994–1995	Maccabi Netanya	29	(4)
1995–1996	Verbroedering Geel	28	(4)
1997	Hoek		

International career
1987	Belgium	1	(0)
- * Club domestic league appearances and goals

Dimitri Mbuyu (born 31 October 1964) is a retired Belgian footballer of Congolese origin. He played as an attacker.

He was the first black player to be selected for Belgium, appearing in one international, a 1–0 loss to Portugal on 4 February 1987 in Braga.

== Club career ==
Former player for KSC Lokeren, he later took over as manager of FC Brussels, after having been coach at KFC Verbroedering Geel during the 2000–2001 season, and caretaker manager of the same club.
