= André Van Maldeghem =

Belgian footballer and coach (1937–2024)

Personal information
- Date of birth: 19 October 1937
- Place of birth: Deinze, Belgium
- Date of death: 17 March 2024 (aged 86)
- Place of death: Deinze, Belgium
- Position: Defender

Youth career
- –1954: Deinze

Senior career*
Years	Team	Apps	(Gls)
1954–	Deinze		(23)
1966–1971	Waregem		
1971–1972	Kortrijk		

Managerial career
- 1969–1970: Waregem
- 1971–1975: Kortrijk
- 1975–1979: Waregem
- 1980–1983: Harelbeke
- 1984–1985: Kortrijk
- 1985–1988: Harelbeke
- 1989: Eendracht Aalst
- 1990–1995: Mouscron
- 1995–1996: Waregem
- 1996–1997: Waregem
- 1998–2000: Hamme
- * Club domestic league appearances and goals

André Van Maldeghem (19 October 1937 – 17 March 2024) was a Belgian football player and coach.

== Career ==
Van Maldeghem was born in Deinze. Van Maldeghem started his football career in the youth ranks at SK Deinze. He joined the K.M.S.K. Deinze first team in 1954 and scored 23 goals that season. Van Maldeghem later transferred to SV Waregem. He played there for five years. At SV Waregem, he played as a defender and later became the leader of the team. Van Maldeghem played for SV Waregem until 1971. He played at KV Kortrijk for a year and retired in 1972.

Van Maldeghem later worked as a sports monitor for the Belgian army at the airbase in Gavere. In 1980, he was appointed a coach at KRC Harelbeke and coached the team until 1988. Van Maldeghem coached SV Waregem for more than four seasons, the last of which was in the 1996–97 season. He coached Mouscron between 1990 and 1995. Van Maldeghem was the coach of KV Kortrijk for six years and he returned to the club during the 1983–84 season, after eight years. He stayed there until c. 1985. Van Maldeghem later coached at the RFBA and at the national team.

== Personal life and death ==
Van Maldeghem died at a nursing home in Petegem-aan-de-leie, on 17 March 2024, aged 86, following a period of ill-health.
