= Marc Millecamps =

Belgian footballer

Personal information
- Date of birth: 9 October 1950 (age 76)
- Place of birth: Waregem, Belgium
- Height: 1.76 m (5 ft 9 in)
- Position: Midfielder

Senior career*
Years	Team	Apps	(Gls)
1968–1988	Waregem		

International career
1980–1982	Belgium	6	(0)

Managerial career
- 1989–1990: Waregem
- 1996–1997: Waregem
- 1999–2000: Waregem
- * Club domestic league appearances and goals

Marc Millecamps (born 9 October 1950) is a Belgian retired footballer who played as a midfielder.

== Club career ==
During his career Millecamps played for Waregem, with whom he reached the semi-finals of the 1985–86 UEFA Cup, beating Italian club A.C. Milan in the third round.

== International career ==
Millecamps earned six caps for the Belgium national team, and participated in UEFA Euro 1980 and the 1982 FIFA World Cup.

== Personal life ==
He is the brother of fellow ex-footballer Luc Millecamps.

== Honours ==
=== Player ===
KSV Waregem

- Belgian Cup: 1973–74; runner-up 1981–82
- Belgian Super Cup: 1982
- UEFA Cup: 1985–86 (semi-finals)
- Tournoi de Paris: 1985

Belgium

- UEFA European Championship: runner-up 1980
- Belgian Sports Merit Award: 1980
