= KSV Waregem =

- Full name: Koninklijke Sportvereniging Waregem
- Founded: 1925; 101 years ago
- Dissolved: 2001; 25 years ago
- Ground: Regenboogstadion, Waregem
- Capacity: 8,500
- League: Belgian First Division; Belgian Second Division; Belgian Third Division

Koninklijke Sportvereniging Waregem was a Belgian football club that existed between 1925 and 2001. It played three spells at the highest level in the Belgian football league system each separated by a single season at the second level: from 1966 to 1972, from 1973 to 1994 and in 1995–96. Their best ranking was reached in 1968, 1985 and 1993 when they finished fourth.

== History ==
Waereghem Sportif (in French) was founded in 1925 in Waregem, West Flanders, then changed its name to Waregem Sportief (its Dutch translation) in 1945. One year later, the club merged with Red Star Waregem to become S.V. Waregem. The new team became a member of the national association on the same year and was assigned the matricule number 4451. In 1951 the club received the right to be called royal (Dutch: Koninklijk) which was at the time given to any team founded 25 years before.

KSV Waregem became the first team from Waregem to play in the second division in 1963. In 1966 it accessed to the first division and remained at that level for a while (except in 1972–73 and in 1994–95). It even won the 1974 Cup and the 1982 Supercup. In 1985–86 UEFA Cup, after eliminating AC Milan, it reached the semifinals, where 1. FC Köln stopped them. In 1996, Waregem was finally relegated to second division where they stayed until 1999 (to fall into third division). In 2001, due to financial problems, the club had to merge with Zultse V.V. and to keep their matricule (n°5381). The new club was named SV Zulte Waregem and it plays the Regenboogstadion that KSV Waregem used to play in. In 2005, SV Zulte Waregem was promoted to the Belgian First Division.

== Honours ==
- Belgian Second Division: 1965–66, 1994–95
- Belgian Cup: 1973–74; runner-up 1981–82
- Belgian Super Cup: 1982
- UEFA Cup: 1985–86 (semi-finals)

Minor

- Jules Pappaert Cup: 1957, 1966
- Tournoi de Paris: 1985

== Former managers ==
- 1946–1948 Jean Bruneau
- 1948–1949 Willy Steyskal
- 1949–1950 Alfons De Winter
- 1950–1951 Robert Goethals
- 1951–1954 Marcel Vercammen
- 1954–1957 Freddy Chaves
- 1957–1960 Jeroom Burssens
- 1960–1961 John Van Alphen
- 1961–1966 Marcel De Corte
- 1966–1972 Freddy Chaves
- 1969–1970 André Van Maldeghem (intérim)
- 1972–1974 Hans Croon
- 1974–1975 Rik Matthijs
- 1975–1979 André Van Maldeghem
- 1978–1979 Julien Van Bever
- 1979–1981 Hans Croon
- 1981–1983 Sándor Popovics
- 1983–1990 Urbain Haesaert
- 1989–1990 Urbain Haesaert, Marc Millecamps, René Verheyen
- 1990–1991 René Verheyen
- 1991–1992 René Verheyen, Paul Theunis
- 1992–1993 Paul Theunis
- 1993–1994 Paul Theunis, Gerrit Laverge, Henk Houwaart
- 1994–1995 Aimé Anthuenis
- 1995–1996 Aimé Anthuenis, André Van Maldeghem
- 1996–1997 Marc Millecamps, André Van Maldeghem, Jerko Tipurić
- 1997–1998 Jerko Tipurić, Gerrit Laverge, Dennis De Tandt
- 1998–1999 Gilbert De Groote, Leo Van der Elst
- 1999–2000 Marc Millecamps
- 2000–2001 Stanley Bollen, Daniel Declerck, Prudent Bettens
