= 2010–11 Belgian Second Division =

Football league

Belgian Second Division
- Season: 2010–11
- Champions: OH Leuven
- Promoted: OH Leuven; Mons
- Relegated: Turnhout; Tournai; Rupel Boom
- Matches: 306
- Goals: 901 (2.94 per match)
- Top goalscorer: Hamdi Harbaoui (25 goals)
- Biggest home win: 4-0 (FC Verbroedering Dender EH vs K Rupel Boom FC) and 5-1 (RAEC Mons vs AFC Tubize)
- Biggest away win: 0-5 (KVSK United Overpelt-Lommel at K Rupel Boom FC)
- Highest scoring: 1-5 (FC Verbroedering Dender EH at KV Turnhout), 5-1 (RAEC Mons vs AFC Tubize), 2-4 (CS Visé at R Boussu Dour Borinage and RAEC Mons at RFC Tournai), 3-3 (RAEC Mons vs OH Leuven and KSK Heist vs KV Turnhout)
- Longest winning run: FC Verbroedering Dender EH (5 games), from 28 August to 25 September
- Longest unbeaten run: Waasland-Beveren (12 games, streak ongoing), since 25 August
- Longest losing run: RFC Tournai (7 games, streak ongoing), since 25 September

The 2010–11 season of the Belgian Second Division (also known as EXQI League for sponsorship reasons) started on Wednesday 18 August 2010 and finished in May 2011. OH Leuven won the title on the penultimate matchday after a 2–2 draw away to Antwerp. Mons also got promoted after winning the playoffs.

== Team changes ==
As a result of the bankruptcy of Mouscron in the first division, the team was automatically demoted to third division. No extra team was promoted to fill this spot and the league therefore moved from 19 teams to the more convenient 18.

=== In ===
- Roeselare relegated from the Pro League
- Heist promoted from Third Division A
- Visé promoted from Third Division B
- Rupel Boom promoted after winning the third division playoffs

=== Out ===
- Lierse was promoted to the Pro League
- Eupen won the second division final round and was therefore also promoted to the Pro League.
- Ronse lost the third division playoffs and was subsequently relegated.
- Beveren did not apply for a professional license due to financial problems. As a result, they were automatically relegated, but they chose to merge with second division team K.V. Red Star Waasland to form Waasland-Beveren and as such remain in second division.
- Liège was relegated to the Third Division.

== Team information ==
=== Personnel and locations ===
Location of teams in Belgian Second Division 2010-11

Club	City	Current manager
F.C.V. Dender E.H.	Denderleeuw	(Belgium) Vital Borkelmans
F.C. Molenbeek Brussels Strombeek	Sint-Jans-Molenbeek	(Belgium) Chris van Puyvelde
Oud-Heverlee Leuven	Leuven	(Belgium) Ronny Van Geneugden
K.V.S.K. United Overpelt-Lommel	Lommel	(Belgium) Franky Van der Elst
Royal Antwerp F.C.	Antwerp	(England) Colin Andrews
A.F.C. Tubize	Tubize	(Belgium) Felice Mazzu
K.S.K. Heist	Heist-op-den-Berg	(Belgium) Cis Bosschaerts
Standaard Wetteren	Wetteren	(Belgium) Wim De Corte
K. Rupel Boom F.C.	Boom	(Belgium) Peter Van Wambeke
K.V.K. Tienen	Tienen	(Belgium) Daniël Nassen
R.A.E.C. Mons	Mons	(Belgium) Geert Broeckaert
R.F.C. Tournai	Tournai	(Belgium) Patrick Asselman
K.S.V. Roeselare	Roeselare	(Belgium) Nico Vanderdonck
K.V. Red Star Waasland-Beveren	Beveren	(Belgium) Dirk Geeraerd
K.V. Turnhout	Turnhout	(Belgium) Luc Beyens
K.V. Oostende	Ostend	(Belgium) Thierry Pister
R. Boussu Dour Borinage	Boussu	(Belgium) Michel Wintacq
R.C.S. Visé	Wezet	(Belgium) José Riga

== Regular season ==
=== League table ===
Pos	Team	Pld	W	D	L	GF	GA	GD	Pts	Promotion or relegation
1	OH Leuven (C, P)	34	22	7	5	75	38	+37	73	Belgian First Division
2	Lommel	34	20	5	9	73	44	+29	65	Qualification for Belgian Second Division final round
3	Mons (O, P)	34	17	8	9	63	38	+25	59	Qualification for Belgian Second Division final round
4	Waasland-Beveren	34	15	11	8	51	35	+16	56	Qualification for Belgian Second Division final round
5	Visé	34	14	9	11	52	48	+4	51	
6	Antwerp	34	14	8	12	54	53	+1	50	
7	Dender	34	15	4	15	54	54	0	49	
8	Tubize	34	13	8	13	46	55	−9	47	
9	Oostende	34	13	6	15	41	48	−7	45	
10	Heist	34	12	7	15	57	67	−10	43	
11	Brussels	34	12	6	16	50	51	−1	42	
12	Wetteren	34	10	12	12	42	51	−9	42	
13	Borinage	34	11	8	15	48	52	−4	41	
14	Tienen	34	11	8	15	35	47	−12	41	
15	Roeselare	34	10	11	13	38	42	−4	41	
16	Turnhout	34	10	10	14	48	59	−11	40	Qualification for Relegation play-off
17	Rupel Boom (R)	34	10	7	17	36	56	−20	37	Relegation to Belgian Third Division
18	Tournai (R)	34	5	9	20	38	63	−25	24	Relegation to Belgian Third Division

Updated to match(es) played on 1 May 2011. Source: Soccerway
Rules for classification: 1) points; 2) number of matches won; if teams are still tied a playoff is organised.
(C) Champions; (O) Play-off winners; (P) Promoted; (R) Relegated

=== Period winners ===
The season is divided into three periods. The first ten matchdays form period 1, matchdays 11 to 22 form period two and the last 12 form period three. The three period winners take part in the Belgian Second Division final round together with the winner of the 2010–11 Belgian Pro League relegation playoff. The winner of this final round gets to play in the 2011–12 Belgian Pro League. In case one or more periods are won by the team winning the league or in case one team wins multiple periods, the extra places go the teams finishing the highest in the league not already qualified. So in the theoretical case that one team wins all three periods and becomes the league champion, then the teams in positions 2, 3 and 4 will take part in the final round.

==== Period 1 ====
Pos	Team	Pld	W	D	L	GF	GA	GD	Pts	Qualification
1	Waasland-Beveren (Q)	10	7	2	1	19	5	+14	23	Belgian Second Division final round
2	Oostende	10	7	0	3	14	13	+1	21	
3	Dender	10	6	2	2	21	9	+12	20	
4	Mons	10	6	2	2	18	11	+7	20	
5	OH Leuven	10	5	3	2	23	15	+8	18	

Updated to match(es) played on 27 March 2011. Source:
Rules for classification: 1) points; 2) number of matches won; if teams are still tied a playoff is organised.
(Q) Qualified for the phase indicated

==== Period 2 ====
Pos	Team	Pld	W	D	L	GF	GA	GD	Pts	Qualification
1	Lommel (Q)	12	11	0	1	38	16	+22	33	Belgian Second Division final round
2	OH Leuven	12	9	1	2	27	13	+14	28	
3	Tubize	12	7	1	4	19	20	−1	22	
4	Mons	12	5	5	2	25	15	+10	20	
5	Borinage	12	6	1	5	22	15	+7	19	

Updated to match(es) played on 21 April 2011. Source:
Rules for classification: 1) points; 2) number of matches won; if teams are still tied a playoff is organised.
(Q) Qualified for the phase indicated

==== Period 3 ====
Pos	Team	Pld	W	D	L	GF	GA	GD	Pts	Qualification
1	OH Leuven (C, P)	12	8	3	1	25	10	+15	27	Belgian Second Division final round
2	Mons	12	6	1	5	20	12	+8	19	
3	Waasland-Beveren	12	6	1	5	18	14	+4	19	
4	Antwerp	12	6	1	5	23	20	+3	19	
5	Brussels	12	6	1	5	20	17	+3	19	

Updated to match(es) played on 1 May 2011. Source:
Rules for classification: 1) points; 2) number of matches won; if teams are still tied a playoff is organised.
(C) Champions; (P) Promoted

=== Results ===
Home \ Away	ANT	BDB	BRU	DEN	HEI	LOM	MON	OHL	KVO	ROE	RUP	TIE	TOU	TUB	TUR	VIS	WBE	WET
Antwerp		2–1	1–1	1–2	1–2	0–4	1–2	2–2	1–0	2–2	2–1	5–1	3–2	2–0	2–0	2–2	1–1	3–1
Borinage	3–0		4–0	3–1	3–3	2–1	3–1	2–3	2–3	1–1	1–1	1–2	2–1	1–2	1–1	2–4	1–3	0–1
Brussels	1–0	0–0		2–0	4–4	2–3	2–0	1–2	1–0	0–1	2–4	1–2	3–0	1–1	2–0	1–2	3–2	1–3
Dender	3–1	3–1	2–1		3–0	2–0	1–0	2–1	1–3	2–1	4–0	0–2	3–1	2–3	2–3	0–0	0–2	1–2
Heist	2–3	2–0	0–4	3–0		1–2	2–2	3–2	3–2	1–2	1–0	2–0	3–2	3–2	3–3	2–3	0–1	1–1
Lommel	3–0	3–2	0–2	3–1	1–1		1–1	4–1	1–1	0–0	4–1	2–1	1–1	4–1	2–0	3–1	2–1	4–0
Mons	1–0	1–0	2–1	3–0	1–2	3–1		3–3	2–0	3–0	3–0	2–2	5–1	5–1	1–1	2–0	3–3	2–1
OH Leuven	2–0	3–0	2–1	1–1	4–1	2–0	3–2		4–1	3–0	2–1	2–0	3–0	2–2	4–0	3–1	3–1	4–1
Oostende	1–3	0–2	0–3	2–3	1–0	2–4	1–1	2–1		1–0	3–0	0–1	2–1	2–1	1–0	0–0	0–2	0–0
Roeselare	2–0	0–0	1–1	1–1	2–3	3–2	0–0	0–1	1–3		1–0	1–2	1–0	0–0	4–1	3–0	1–2	1–1
Rupel Boom	0–2	1–1	3–1	2–1	1–0	0–5	1–0	0–1	2–1	0–1		2–0	2–1	1–1	0–3	1–1	4–2	2–2
Tienen	1–3	1–2	1–2	2–1	4–1	0–1	1–0	0–0	0–1	2–1	0–2		2–2	1–3	2–1	2–0	0–0	1–2
Tournai	1–3	1–2	2–1	1–3	3–1	2–3	2–4	1–2	2–1	1–1	0–0	0–0		0–1	1–1	1–2	0–0	2–3
Tubize	1–2	1–0	3–2	0–2	3–0	0–3	0–2	2–2	2–1	1–0	3–1	1–1	0–2		4–0	2–0	0–3	1–1
Turnhout	2–2	0–1	5–2	1–5	3–1	3–2	1–0	0–2	1–1	2–2	2–1	2–0	1–1	1–1		2–3	1–0	0–1
Visé	3–1	2–3	1–0	4–0	2–2	2–1	0–3	1–1	1–2	1–3	2–1	1–1	4–0	3–0	3–1		0–1	0–0
Waasland-Beveren	1–1	3–0	0–0	3–1	2–1	4–1	1–0	2–1	1–1	3–0	1–1	3–0	0–0	1–2	0–4	1–1		0–1
Wetteren	2–2	1–1	0–1	1–1	0–3	1–2	2–3	1–3	1–2	2–1	2–0	0–0	0–3	4–1	2–2	1–2	1–1	

Updated to match(es) played on 1 May 2011. Source: Soccerway
Legend: Blue = home team win; Yellow = draw; Red = away team win.

== Top scorers ==
25 goals

- (Tunisia) Hamdi Harbaoui (Oud-Heverlee Leuven)

21 goals

- (Belgium) Kevin Oris (Royal Antwerp F.C.)

20 goals

- (Netherlands) Jeroen Ketting (Lommel United)

18 goals

- (The Gambia) Mustapha Jarju (R.A.E.C. Mons)

17 goals

- (Belgium) Guillaume Legros (C.S. Visé)
- (France) Kamel Ouejdide (Boussu Dour Borinage)

16 goals

- (Belgium) Bram Criel (K.S.K. Heist)
- (Belgium) Jan de Langhe (K. Standaard Wetteren)

15 goals

- (Belgium) Jordan Remacle (Oud-Heverlee Leuven)

14 goals

- (France) Jérémy Perbet (R.A.E.C. Mons)
- (Serbia) Dalibor Veselinović (FC Brussels)
