= Olivier Suray =

Belgian footballer

Personal information
- Full name: Olivier Marcel Ghislain Suray
- Date of birth: 16 October 1971 (age 55)
- Place of birth: Namur, Belgium
- Height: 1.84 m (6 ft 0 in)
- Position: Defender

Team information
- Current team: RCS Braine (Manager)

Senior career*
| Years | Team | Apps | (Gls) |
| 1989–1993 | Sporting Charleroi | 94 | (5) |
| 1993–1996 | Anderlecht | | |
| 1996–1997 | Sporting Charleroi | | |
| 1997–1998 | Standard Liège | | |
| 1998–1999 | Altay | 30 | (2) |
| 2000 | Adanaspor | 6 | (0) |
| 2000–2001 | Beveren | 25 | (0) |
| 2001–2002 | La Louvière | 22 | (0) |
| 2002–2005 | RAEC | 66 | (0) |
| 2005 | AC Allianssi | | |

Managerial career
- 2012–2014: Léopold FC
- 2014–2016: Léopold FC
- 2016: RC de Schaerbeek
- 2016–2019: RCS Braine
- 2019–2020: Léopold FC
- 2021: Gosselies Sports
- 2021–: RCS Braine
- * Club domestic league appearances and goals as of 20 June 2022

Olivier Suray (born 16 October 1971) is a Belgian football manager and former professional player who played for several clubs in Europe.

In 2006, he was implicated in a match-fixing scandal involving Chinese business executive Zheyun Ye. Prior to that in 2005, Suray was named the CEO of Finnish Veikkausliiga club AC Allianssi by the new Belgian-Chinese owners. He also hired Thierry Pister the club's new manager and brought six new players from Belgium to Allianssi, including Jean-Pierre La Placa, Hocine Chebaïki, Mustapha Douaï, Sergei Omelianovitch, Kasim Yildiz and Grégory Goffin. The club's first choice keeper Henri Sillanpää was sent to Belgium for an ambiguous fake trial match. Allianssi lost the following match against FC Haka 8–0, which sparked suspicion of match-fixing.

== Club career ==
Suray had a spell in the Turkish Süper Lig with Altay S.K. and Adanaspor and several seasons in the Belgian First Division with R. Charleroi S.C., R.S.C. Anderlecht and R.A.E.C. Mons.
