= Hocine Chebaïki =

Belgian footballer

Personal information
- Full name: Hocine Chebaïki
- Date of birth: November 12, 1976 (age 49)
- Place of birth: Mons, Belgium
- Height: 1.75 m (5 ft 9 in)
- Position: Midfielder

Senior career*
Years	Team	Apps	(Gls)
1994–1995	La Louvière	1	(0)
1995–1996	Union SG	27	(0)
1996–1998	Tournai	57	(4)
1998–2003	Mons	92	(12)
2003–2004	Ronse	41	(1)
2004–2005	Mons	8	(0)
2005	Ronse	8	(0)
2005–2006	AC Allianssi	15	(1)
2006–2008	FC Charleroi	65	(10)
2008–2013	La Louvière Centre	107	(9)
2013	Olympic Charleroi		
- * Club domestic league appearances and goals

Hocine Chebaïki (born November 12, 1976) is a retired Belgian footballer who last played for Olympic Charleroi.

== Club career ==
Of Algerian descent, Chebaïki began his career with La Louvière. He spent half a season with Mons in the Belgian Pro League, making 8 appearances. In the summer of 2005, Chebaïki joined Veikkausliiga side AC Allianssi in Finland.
