= Magerman =

Magerman is a surname. Notable people with the surname include:

- David Magerman (born 1968), American computer scientist and philanthropist
- Frank Magerman (born 1977), Belgian footballer and manager
- Gezelle Magerman (born 1997), South African hurdler
