= Bimbo Fatokun =

Nigerian retired footballer

Personal information
- Full name: Bimbo Fatokun Lanre
- Date of birth: 13 October 1978 (age 48)
- Place of birth: Nigeria
- Position: Forward

Senior career*
Years	Team	Apps	(Gls)
1995-2002	Royal Antwerp F.C.	111	(20)
2002-2003	Scarborough F.C.	22	(8)
2004	K.R.C. Mechelen		
2005	KFC Schoten SK		
- * Club domestic league appearances and goals

Bimbo Fatokun (born 13 October 1978) is a Nigerian retired footballer.

== Career ==
Fatokun started his senior career with Royal Antwerp, where he made over one hundred and twenty-two appearances and scored over twenty goals. After that, he played for English club Scarborough FC and Belgian clubs K.R.C. Mechelen and KFC Schoten SK before retiring in 2005.
