= Mustapha Douaï =

Belgian former footballer (born 1975)

Personal information
- Date of birth: 17 October 1975 (age 51)
- Place of birth: Belgium
- Height: 1.80 m (5 ft 11 in)
- Position: Centre back

Senior career*
Years	Team	Apps	(Gls)
- UE Chapelloise
1996–1998	Charleroi	8	(0)
1998–2004	Mons	52	(2)
2004–2005	Ronse	2	(0)
2005	AC Allianssi	12	(0)
2006–2007	RACS Couillet		
2007–2009	URS Centre	4	(0)
2009–2015	CSE Manageoise		
2015–2017	AS Fontainoise		
2017–2018	RAS Monceau		
- * Club domestic league appearances and goals

Mustapha Douaï (born 17 October 1975) is a Belgian former professional footballer who played as a centre back. Besides in his native Belgium, Douaï played for AC Allianssi in Finnish Veikkausliiga in 2005, also representing the club in the UEFA Cup.
