= Fi Van Hoof =

Belgian footballer

Personal information
- Full name: Wilfried Van Hoof
- Date of birth: 3 July 1941 (age 85)
- Place of birth: Bonheiden, Belgium
- Position: Midfielder

Senior career*
Years	Team	Apps	(Gls)
1963–1971	Mechelen		
1971–1975	Putte		

Managerial career
- 1971–1976: Mechelen (youth)
- 1980–1989: Mechelen (assistant)
- 1989–1991: Mechelen
- 1991–1992: Mechelen (assistant)
- 1992–1994: Mechelen
- 1995–1997: Lokeren
- 1998–1999: Olympia Wilrijk
- 2001: Mechelen (assistant)
- 2001–2002: Mechelen
- 2002–2003: Mechelen (assistant)
- 2003–2015: Mechelen (director of sports)
- 2016–: Mechelen (director of sports)
- * Club domestic league appearances and goals

Fi Van Hoof (born 3 July 1941) is a Belgian football midfielder and later manager.
