= Rudi Cossey =

Belgian footballer (born 1961)

Personal information
- Date of birth: 2 August 1961 (age 65)
- Place of birth: Brussels, Belgium
- Position: Defender

Team information
- Current team: Charleroi (assistant manager)

Senior career*
Years	Team	Apps	(Gls)
1980–1990	RWDM		
1990–1995	Club Brugge	99	(6)
1995–1996	Lokeren	2	(0)

Managerial career
- 1995–1999: Lokeren (assistant)
- 1999: Lokeren (caretaker manager)
- 1999–2006: Lokeren (assistant)
- 2006: Lokeren
- 2006: Lokeren (assistant)
- 2006: Lokeren (caretaker manager)
- 2006–2007: Lokeren (assistant)
- 2007–2008: OH Leuven
- 2008–2009: Mons (assistant)
- 2009: Mons
- 2010–2015: Lokeren (assistant)
- 2015–2016: Gent (assistant)
- 2016–2017: Genk (assistant)
- 2017–2019: Club Brugge (assistant)
- 2019: Cercle Brugge (assistant)
- 2020–2022: Antwerp (assistant)
- 2022–2025: Charleroi (assistant)
- 2025–: OH Leuven (assistant)
- * Club domestic league appearances and goals

Rudi Cossey (born 2 August 1961) is a Belgian football coach and former player. He was assistant coach of KSC Lokeren OV from 1995 to 2007, and in this team, he could also take a few times the responsibility of the interim head coach. Later on, he was coach of OH Leuven and Mons. In the summer of 2010, he returned to Lokeren as assistant coach. Cossey then became assistant consecutively at Gent in 2015, Genk in 2016, Club Brugge in 2017, Cercle Brugge in 2019, Antwerp in 2020, Charleroi in 2022, and OH Leuven in 2025.
