= Mowing-Devil =

English woodcut pamphlet published in 1678

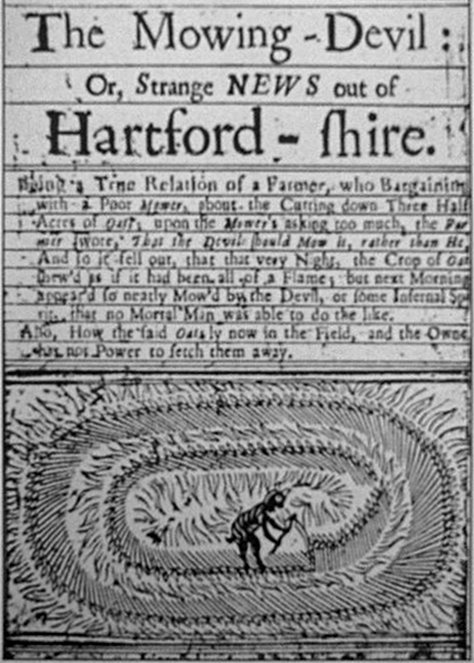
The Mowing Devil pamphlet.

The Mowing-Devil: or, Strange News out of Hartford-shire is the title of an English woodcut pamphlet published in 1678. It narrates a tale of Satan mowing a field in Hertfordshire, and presents itself as reporting the news. It has been cited as an early report of crop circles.

== Content ==
The pamphlet tells a "strange" news story of an anonymous farmer in Hertfordshire who, refusing to pay the price demanded by a farmworker to mow his field of oats, swore he would rather the Devil mowed it instead.

According to the pamphlet, that night his field appeared to be in flame. The next morning, the field was found to be perfectly mowed, "that no mortal man was able to do the like".

This pamphlet, and the accompanying illustration, are often cited by crop circle researchers as among the first recorded cases of crop circles. Crop circle researcher Jim Schnabel does not consider it to be a historical precedent because it describes the stalks as being cut, while modern crop circles involve the wheat, barley or, less commonly, other plants being bent.

== Transcription ==
The Mowing-Devil: Or, Strange NEWS out of Hartford-ſhire. Being a True Relation of a Farmer, who Bargaining with a poor Mower, about the Cutting down Three Half Acres of Oats upon the Mower’s asking too much, the Farmer ſwore, ‘That the Devil ſhould Mow it, rather than He.’ And lo it fell out, that that very Night, the Crop of Oats ſhew’d as if it had been all of a Flame, but next Morning appear’d ſo neatly Mow’d by the Devil, or ſome Infernal Spirit, that no Mortal Man was able to do the like. Alſo, How the ſaid Oats ly now in the Field, and the Owner has not Power to fetch them away.
