= Matisse Thuys =

Belgian footballer (born 1998)

Personal information
- Full name: Matisse Thuys
- Date of birth: 24 January 1998 (age 28)
- Height: 1.84 m (6 ft 0 in)
- Position: Midfielder

Team information
- Current team: Stekene

Youth career
- Kabouters Opglabbeek
- –2016: Genk

Senior career*
Years	Team	Apps	(Gls)
2016–2018	Genk II		
2017–2018	→ MVV (loan)	16	(0)
2018–2019	ASV Geel	28	(3)
2019–2022	Visé	51	(11)
2022–2023	Rupel Boom	6	(0)
2023–2024	Houtvenne		
2024–2025	Lille		
2025–	Stekene		

International career
2013	Belgium U15	1	(0)
2013–2014	Belgium U16	6	(0)
2014–2015	Belgium U17	21	(1)
- * Club domestic league appearances and goals as of 7 October 2022

Matisse Thuys (born 24 January 1998) is a Belgian footballer who plays for sixth tier club Stekene.

== Club career ==
He made his Eerste Divisie debut for MVV Maastricht on 18 August 2017 in a game against Go Ahead Eagles.
