= Ye Zheyun =

Chinese businessman

- 叶泽云
- Born: China
- Disappeared: November 2005 (age 40); Belgium
- Status: never apprehended, remains at large
- Occupation: businessman
- Known for: Involvement in a Belgian football corruption and betting scandal in 2005.

Ye Zheyun (Chinese: 叶泽云) is a Chinese businessman who was accused of being involved in a Belgian football corruption and betting scandal that took place in 2005. It was alleged that several teams and/or players received money from Ye to influence match results, so corrupt bookmakers could be certain of a gambling profit.

== Background information ==
Teams mentioned in the scandal are Lierse, La Louvière, Sint-Truiden, Mons, Geel and also Germinal Beerschot. Ye always appeared at teams with financial problems, except for Beerschot, who had at that time a crucial match against AEC Mons, who were on the verge of relegation. The insinuations about fixed results started after a few matches, which were heavily bet on, with strange events and/or results. Such as, e.g. Lierse starting with a reserve team twice unexpectedly. Ye had also been the owner of Finnish team AC Allianssi, due to bankruptcy a now defunct club that also seemed to experience some strange match events at the end of their existence. Police investigated the case, but found insufficient evidence.

== Disappearance ==
Ye mostly worked together with Pietro Allatta and Olivier Suray. Police arrested both, but Allatta and Suray were released after interrogation. In March 2006, the Belgian Justice Department ordered an international arrest warrant against Ye. It is unknown where he currently is. His lawyer told French sports paper L'Équipe that Ye denied all accusations and that he was residing somewhere in China.

He was found guilty in absentia by a court in Brussels in June 2014 of bribing football coaches Paul Put, Patrick Deman, and Gilbert Bodart to lose matches, who were all also found guilty.

== See also ==
- List of fugitives from justice who disappeared
