= Bob Maertens =

Belgian footballer

- Maertens with Antwerp

Personal information
- Full name: Robert Maertens
- Date of birth: 24 January 1930
- Place of birth: Boom, Belgium
- Date of death: 11 January 2003 (aged 72)
- Position: Midfielder

Senior career*
Years	Team	Apps	(Gls)
1948–1959	Royal Antwerp	282	(8)
1959–1963	Olympic de Charleroi-Marchienne	?	(?)

International career
1952–1956	Belgium	12	(0)

Managerial career
- 1968–1970: Royal Antwerp
- 1976–1977: K.R.C. Mechelen
- * Club domestic league appearances and goals

Robert Maertens (24 January 1930 – 11 January 2003) was a Belgian international footballer who played as a midfielder.

== Career ==
Born in Boom, Maertens played club football for Royal Antwerp and Olympic de Charleroi-Marchienne.

He earned a total of 12 caps for Belgium between 1952 and 1956, and participated at the 1954 FIFA World Cup.

== Honours ==
Royal Antwerp FC

- Belgian First Division: 1956–57
- Belgian Cup: 1954–55
