= Rupel Boom FC =

Belgian football club

Rupel Boom
- Full name: Koninklijke Rupel Boom Football Club
- Nickname: De Steenbakkers (The Brickmakers)
- Founded: 1998; 28 years ago
- Ground: Gemeentelijk Parkstadion
- Capacity: 8,000
- Chairman: Nathan Crockett
- Manager: Sam Verleyen
- League: Belgian Division 2
- 2025–26: Belgian Division 2 VV B, 5th of 16
- Website: rupelboomfc.be

Koninklijke Rupel Boom FC is a Belgian association football club based in Boom, Antwerp province currently playing in the Belgian Division 2, the fourth tier of Belgian football. They play at the Gemeentelijk Parkstadion in Boom.

== History ==
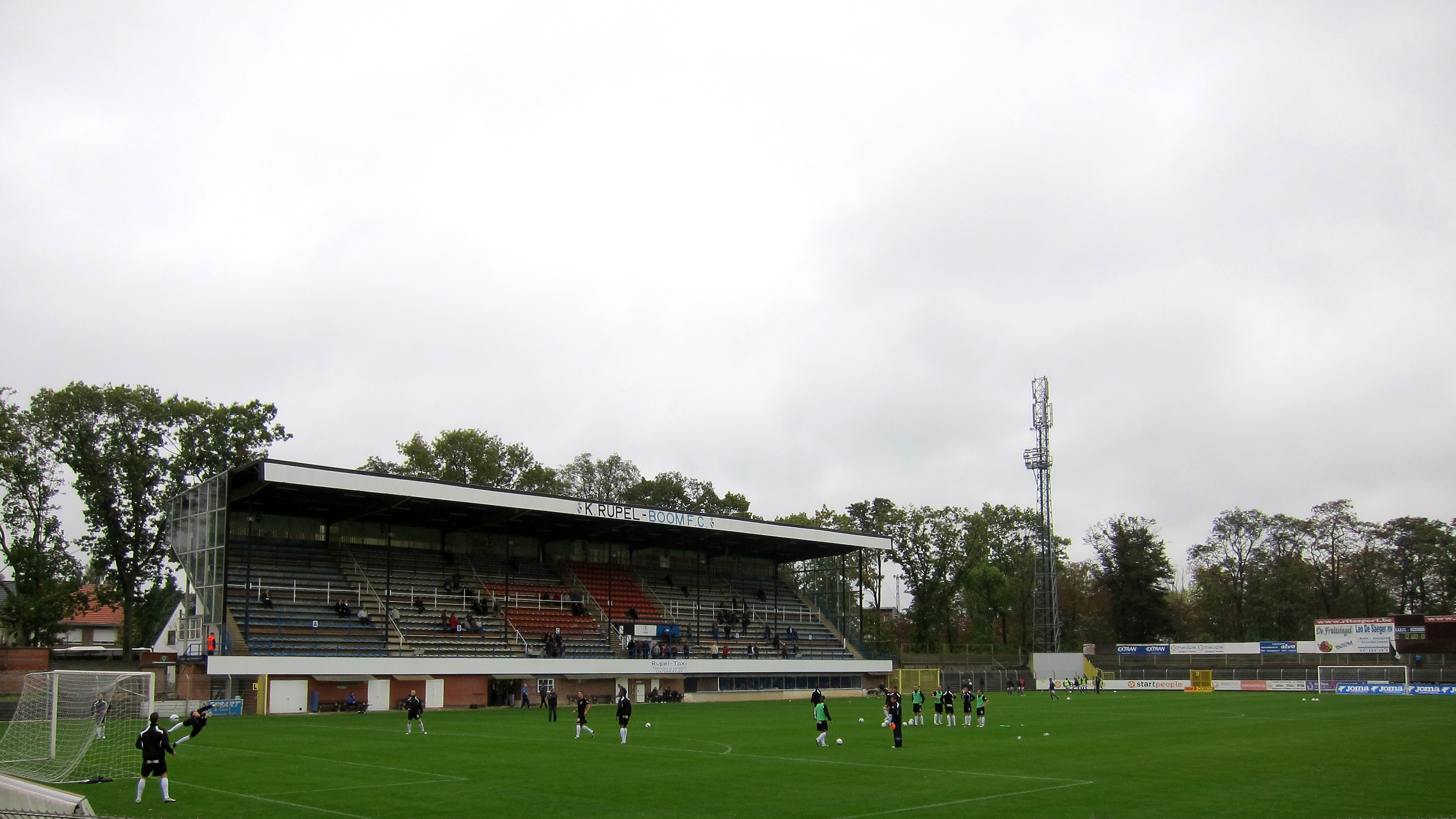
Gemeentelijk Parkstadion

K. Rupel Boom FC was founded in 1998, a result of a merger between K. Boom F.C. and Rupel SK. The club started playing in the regional third division of the Belgian provincial leagues. In 1999 they were promoted to the regional second division and in 2001 to the regional first division.

In 2004 the club reached the Nationwide Fourth Division. In its first season they reached the playoffs and won promotion to the Belgian Third Division. But, after only one season, K. Rupel Boom FC were relegated back to Fourth Division.

In 2008 the club again won promotion to the Belgian Third Division, and in 2009 they narrowly missed a ticket for the promotion playoffs.

After being on top of the league since mid September 2009, the club fell back and were beaten to the title by K.S.K. Heist with only one match to play. As runner-up of the regular season, they played the promotion playoffs in which they defeated Eendracht Aalst in the first round (4–0:3–4) and R.O.C. de Charleroi-Marchienne in the second round (2–2:0–2). The final was played against U.R.S. du Centre (1–0: 4:4). And so, at the end of the 2009–2010 season, Rupel Boom were promoted to the Belgian Second Division.

In November 2010, Peter Van Wambeke was fired as head coach after a string of bad results. He became the first trainer in Rupel Boom history to be prematurely released off his contract.

In December 2010, Rupel Boom appointed Yves Cloots as the new head coach of the club. Cloots was Technical Manager with KV Mechelen and head coach of Rapid Leest. This change in head coach did not have the desired effect, and after the 2010–2011 season, Rupel Boom were relegated back to the Third Division.

For the 2011–12 season, Johan Houben was appointed as the new manager. During this season, Rupel Boom had a very successful cup run, beating Acrenoise (Belgian Promotion), Boussu Dour (2nd Division), Oud-Heverlee Leuven (1st Division) and Belgian record champion Anderlecht against all odds. For Anderlecht, it was the first time since 1954 (against VV Terhagen) that they were eliminated by a Third Division team. Rupel Boom eventually lost the quarter finals against Mons with 2–0 in the first leg and 2–2 draw at home.

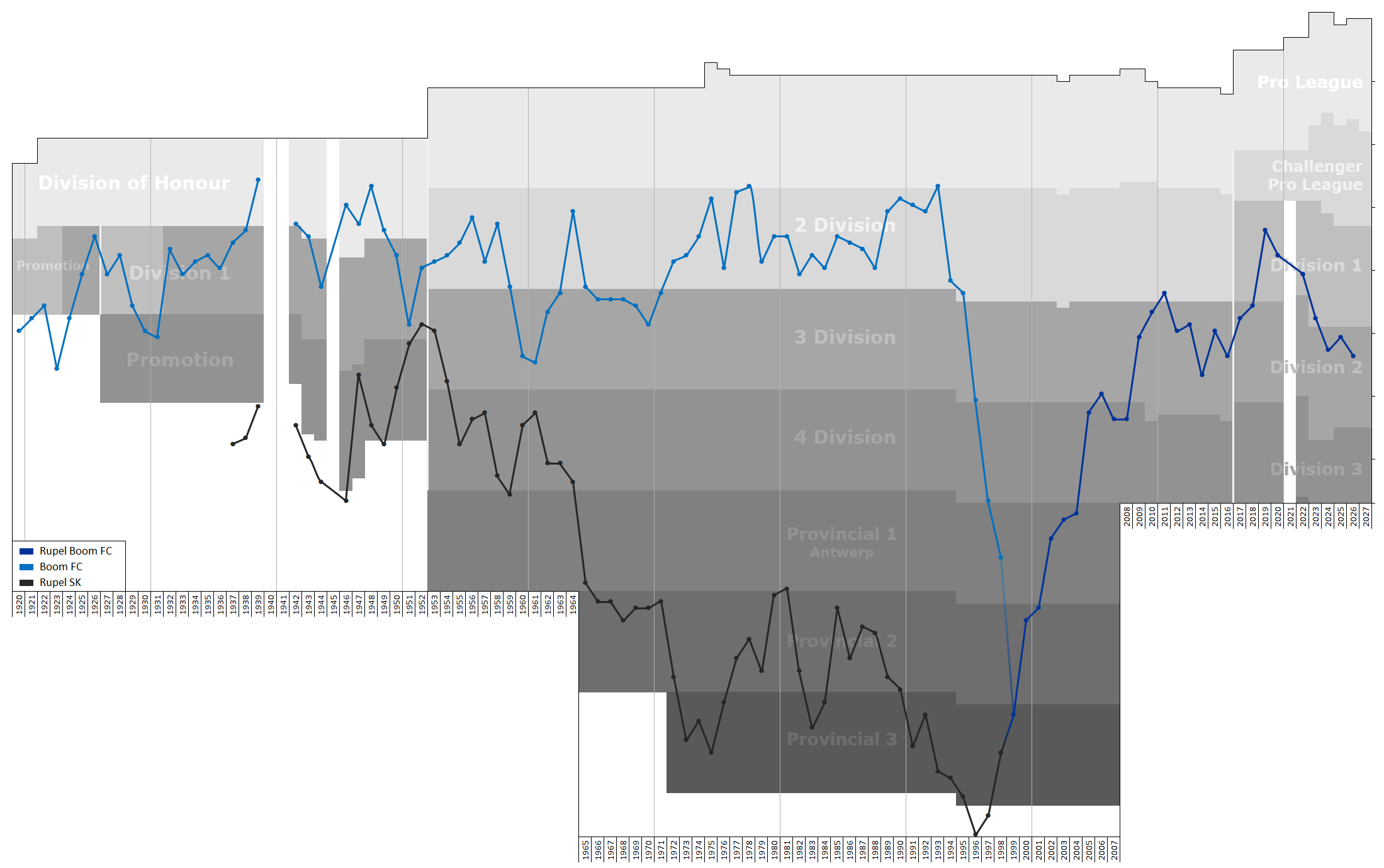
Historical league performance chart of Rupel Boom FC and its predecessors

In May 2013 player Alexander Bell was selected for Scotland u20 for an international youth tournament in Den Haag, Netherlands.

The 2013–14 season started well, with a first place after 5 games. But after a series of heavy losses, trainer Johan Houben stepped down as manager. Club captain and icon Jerry Poorters also resigned from the club. Frank Staes was appointed new manager in September 2013. In his first game in charge, Rupel Boom won against KSV Standaard Wetteren with 2–0, after being reduced to 9 men after 40 minutes of play, with a 0–0 on the board. The team ended a disappointing season in 13th place, just 3 points above the relegation places.

Halfway through the 2014–15 season, head coach Frank Staes resigned and was replaced by his assistant Serge Van Den Stock, who eventually signed a two-year contract with the club. With Van Den Stock, Rupel Boom won 6 of its last 11 matches, and drew 2, finishing the season in 5th place.

In October 2015 Serge Van Den Stockt was fired and replaced by his assistant Robbie Grauwloos. Former K. Boom FC player and Belgian international Glenn De Boeck was appointed as Technical Advisor. De Boeck left the club in January 2016 to become head coach of First Division club Mouscron Péruwelz. Rupel Boom finished the season in 9th place.

For the new season 2016–17, former coach Urbain Spaenhoven was appointed as the new coach. It's his second stint as head coach after leaving the club for KV Mechelen in 2010.

Rupel Boom was crowned as champions of the 2nd Amateur league after the 2017–18 season. They will be playing in the highest Amateur League for the 2018–19 season.

=== Take over by Beerschot ===
In March 2019 it was announced the club would be taken over by Beerschot Wilrijk, with the Rupel Boom senior team continuing in the highest amateur league. Former Olympic athlete Tia Hellebaut joined the club to become an advisor at the club's academy with former referee Frans Van Den Wijngaert in charge of the set-up.

== Seasons ==
Season	Division							Division	Points	Remarks
	I	II	III	IV	P.I	P.II	P.III			
1998–99							2	Regional Third Division	65	promotion
1999–00						3		Regional Second Division	54	
2000–01						1		Regional Second Division	73	champion
2001–02					6			Regional First Division	53	
2002–03					3			Regional First Division	63	
2003–04					2			Regional First Division	64	promotion
2004–05				2				Fourth Division B	53	promotion
2005–06			15					Third Division A	19	relegation
2006–07				3				Fourth Division B	55	
2007–08				3				Fourth Division B	64	promotion
2008–09			6					Third Division B	49	
2009–10			2					Third Division A	71	promotion, final against U.R.S. du Centre 1–0: 4:4
2010–11		17						Second Division	36	relegation
2011–12			5					Third Division	58	¼ Final Belgian Cup after eliminating RSC Anderlecht
2012–13			4					Third Division	56	
2013–14			13					Third Division	36	
2014–15			5					Third Division	54	
2015–16			9					Third Division	51	
2016–17				3				Second Amateur League		
2017–18				1				Second Amateur League	61	Champion
2018–19			–					First Amateur League		

== Club honours ==
- Belgian Cup
  - ¼ Finale 2012
- Second Amateur League
  - winner: 2018
- Third Division
  - promotion 2010
- Fourth Division
  - promotion: 2005 & 2008
- Regional First Division
  - promotion: 2004
- Regional Second Division
  - winner: 2001
- Regional Third Division
  - promotion: 1999

== Individual honours ==
- Top Goal Scorer Third Division
  - Stavros Glouftsis: 28 goals in 2009–2010

== Current squad ==
As of 8 October 2022

Note: Flags indicate national team as defined under FIFA eligibility rules; some limited exceptions apply. Players may hold more than one non-FIFA nationality.

No.	Pos.	Nation	Player
1	GK	BEL	Juliaan Laverge
2	DF	NED	Jeffrey Neral
3	DF	BEL	Jonathan Vervoort
4	MF	BEL	Brice Verkerken
5	DF	LTU	Martynas Medelinskas
6	MF	BEL	Charni Ekangamene
7	FW	MKD	Emil Abaz
8	MF	BEL	Jason Bourdouxhe
9	FW	KOR	Seongheon Baik
10	MF	BEL	Jack Mmaee
11	MF	BEL	Levi Lukebakio
14	FW	BEL	Stephen Buyl
17	DF	BEL	Koen Van Den Broek

No.	Pos.	Nation	Player
19	FW	GUI	Oumar Traoré
20	MF	FRA	Momar Gadji
21	DF	BEL	Fabio Scarantino
22	FW	BEL	Diego Señorans
23	GK	BEL	Senne Vits
24	FW	CRO	Ivan Lendrić
25	MF	BEL	Luka De Herdt
26	MF	BEL	Matisse Thuys
27	FW	BEL	Rabbi Mwenda
34	FW	BEL	Yassin Aydouni
51	DF	BEL	Maxime Thiel
72	GK	BEL	Bout Van Opstal

== Supporters Player of the Year ==
This is an election organised by supportersclub Blue Corner/De Steenbakkers.

- 1998–99: Mohamed El Makrimi
- 1999–00: Chris Delhaye
- 2000–01: Chris Delhaye
- 2001–02: Tommy Meire
- 2002–03: Jo Engelborghs
- 2003–04: Branko Stojanovic
- 2004–05: Bart Verdijck
- 2005–06: Jo Engelborghs
- 2006–07: Jerry Poorters
- 2007–08: Kenny Laevaert
- 2008–09: Jerry Poorters
- 2009–10: Frank Magerman
- 2010–11: Jerry Poorters
- 2011–12: Ruben Smet
- 2012–13: Nick Vanderwesterlaeken
- 2013–14: Jeff Vogels
- 2014–15: Seppe Kill
- 2015–16: Jasper Otte
- 2016–17 Jeroen Van den Driesche
- 2017–18 Jonas Laureys
- 2018–19

== Previous trainers ==
As of 5 October 2025

- (Belgium) Sam Verleyen (2023–present)
- (Chad) Kévin Nicaise (2023)
- (Belgium) Pascal Pilotte (2022)
- (Belgium) Stéphane Demets (2022)
- (Belgium) Steven De Groot (2021–2022)
- (Spain) José Durán (2021)
- (Belgium) Greg Vanderidt (2018–2021)
- (Belgium) Urbain Spaenhoven (2016–2018)
- (Belgium) Robbie Grauwloos (2015–2016)
- (Belgium) Serge Van Den Stock (2014–2015)
- (Belgium) Frank Staes (2014)
- (Belgium) Johan Houben (2011–2014)
- (Belgium) Yves Cloots (2010–2011)
- (Belgium) Peter Van Wambeke (2010)
- (Belgium) Urbain Spaenhoven (2006–2010)
- (Belgium) Raoul Peeters (2003–2006)
- (Belgium) Pierre Brits (2000–2003)
