= KRC Mechelen =

Belgian football club

Racing Mechelen
- Full name: Koninklijke Racing Club Mechelen
- Nicknames: Den Racing, De Racingers
- Founded: 1904; 122 years ago (creation)
- Ground: Oscar Vankesbeeckstadion, Mechelen
- Capacity: 6,123
- Chairman: Koen Van Exem
- Manager: Lucien Suykens
- Coach: James Van Vaerenbergh
- League: Belgian Division 2
- 2025–26: Belgian Division 2 VV B, 9th of 16
Home colours	Away colours

Koninklijke Racing Club Mechelen, simply known as Racing Mechelen or KRC Mechelen, is a Belgian association football club from Mechelen in the Antwerp province. It is a long-time rival of KV Mechelen. The club's best position ever is a second place in the first division 1951–52. KRC Mechelen also reached the final of the Belgian Cup in 1954. However, the team has been falling through the Belgian football league system since 2015 and in the 2017–18 season it was playing in the Belgian Provincial Leagues for the first time since 1906.

== History ==
Founded in July 1904 as Racing Club de Malines, the club registered with the federation two years later on 22 June 1906 and received the matricule n°24. The name of the club changed three times: first the suffix Société Royale was added (1929), then the name was translated into Dutch becoming Koninklijke Racing Club Mechelen (1937).

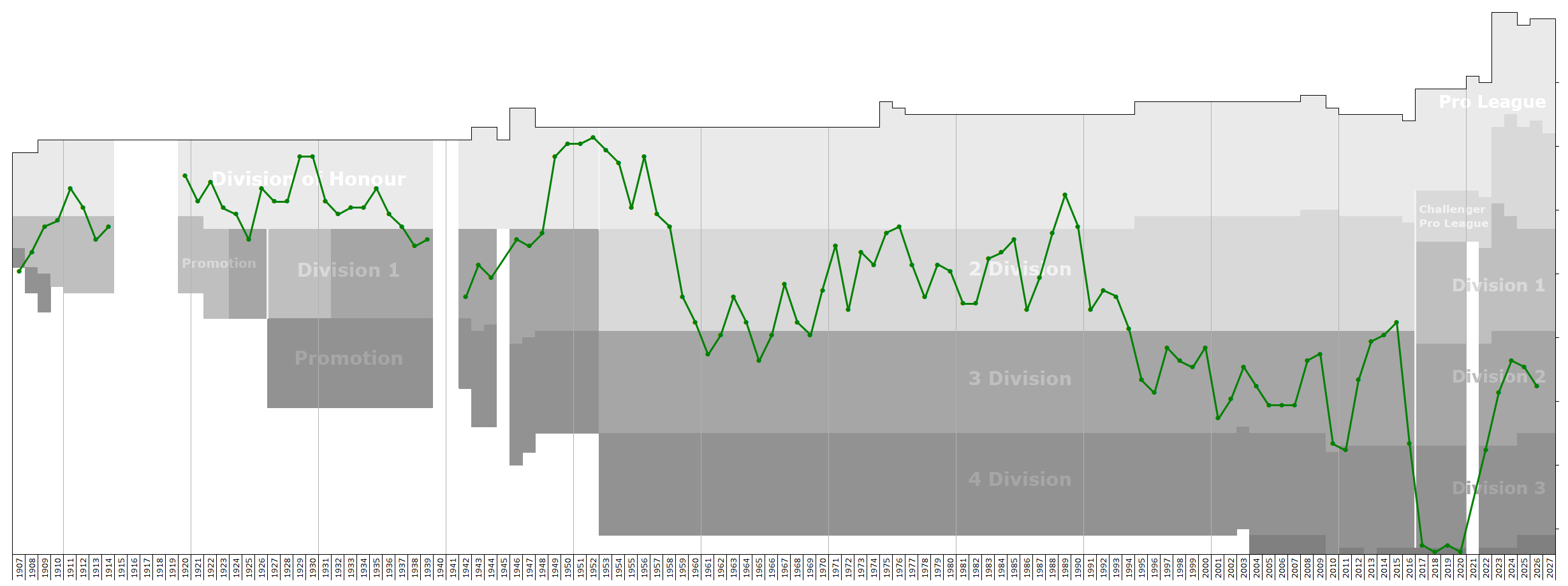
Historical chart of KRC Mechelen league performance

Racing Mechelen played its first season in the first division in 1910–11 and finished 8th of 12 teams. By this time, rival FC Malines, later called KV Mechelen, was playing in second division. The following season, Racing ended 11th just one point away from Beerschot and was relegated. Just before World War I, Racing finished second in their division while FC Malines was third (8 points behind). Thus RC Malines were promoted, playing the following season in the first division, which was played in 1919–20. They ended in 6th place. Two years after that FC Malines was playing in the first division too. In 1929 and 1930 after having spent one year in the second division (1924), the club grabbed third place in the first division. A record it would beat in 1952 with a second-place finish after a new sequence of two third places (1950 and 1951). In 1954 it qualified for the final game of the Belgian Cup. Afterwards, the club fell to the second division and has rarely played at a higher level in recent decades.

== Stadium ==
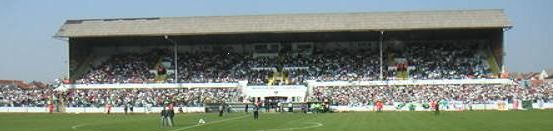
3 April 2004: North stand

The Oscar Vankesbeeckstadion is a football stadium in the Belgian city of Mechelen. The stadium is located just to the north of the centre of town over the River Dijle. It was built in 1923 and is named after the former president of the club: Oscar Van Kesbeeck (1886–1943) who was a Flemish Liberal Politician. The current capacity of the stadium is 6,123. The Oscar Vankesbeeckstadion is located just under a mile away from Argosstadion Achter de Kazerne, which is home to rivals KV Mechelen.

== Honours ==
- Belgian First Division:
  - Runners-up (1): 1951–52
  - Third place (4): 1928–29, 1929–30, 1949–50, 1950–51
- Belgian Second Division:
  - Winners (4): 1909–10, 1947–1948, 1974–1975, 1987–1988
  - Runners-up (5): 1913–1914, 1924–1925, 1938–1939, 1945–1946, 1984–1985
- Belgian Third Division:
  - Winners (4): 1961–1962, 1965–1966, 1968–1969, 2013–2014
- Belgian Cup:
  - Runners-up (1): 1953–1954

== Current squad ==
Note: Flags indicate national team as defined under FIFA eligibility rules; some limited exceptions apply. Players may hold more than one non-FIFA nationality.

No.	Pos.	Nation	Player
1	GK	BEL	Gianni De Ruysscher
2	DF	BEL	Thibault Borrens
3	DF	BEL	Stein Stuyck
4	MF	BEL	Niels Mariën
5	MF	BEL	Nils Van Delm
6	FW	BEL	Dani Martinez Correas
7	FW	BEL	Dean Maleszewski
8	MF	BEL	Andreas Luckermans
9	FW	BEL	Wannes Janssens
10	MF	BEL	Lothar Hens
11	DF	BEL	Yannick Dierickx
12	MF	BEL	Savio Stoffels
13	FW	BEL	Sacha Fontaine

No.	Pos.	Nation	Player
14	FW	BEL	Kevin Huysmans
17	FW	BEL	Kevin Yagan
18	MF	BEL	Augustin Dondo
19	DF	BEL	Wout Kerckhofs
20	DF	BEL	Bram Kerckhofs
21	DF	BEL	Christophe Van Dorst
22	GK	BEL	Indy Van Bulck
23	GK	BEL	Frederic Ledent
26	MF	BEL	Sabri Hmouda
—	FW	BEL	Dean Doncos
—	FW	BEL	Alessandro Pignoloni
—	FW	BEL	Alec Mertens

== On loan ==
Note: Flags indicate national team as defined under FIFA eligibility rules; some limited exceptions apply. Players may hold more than one non-FIFA nationality.

No.	Pos.	Nation	Player

== Managers ==
- 1919–56: (Belgium) Jan Dogaer
- 1956–57: (Belgium) Richard Gedopt
- 1957–58: (Hungary) Janos Pintye
- 1958–58: (Belgium) Guillaume Placklé
- 1958–61: (Belgium) Marcel Bruyninckx
- 1961–62: (Belgium) Albert Herremans
- 1962–63: (Belgium) Marius Mondele
- 1963–64: (Belgium) Gérard Engelen
- 1964–65: (Belgium) Jean Hamers
- 1965–68: (Belgium) Rik Van Herp
- 1968–68: (Belgium) Jos De Winne
- 1968–68: (Belgium) Emile Deghislage
- 1968–72: (Belgium) Rik Matthys
- 1972–72: (Romania) Oliver Gaspar
- 1972–76: (West Germany) Ernst Künnecke
- 1976–77: (Belgium) Bob Maertens
- 1977–81: (Belgium) Raoul Peeters
- 1981–83: (Belgium) Jean-Pierre Borremans
- 1983–85: (Belgium) Albert Bers
- 1985–86: (Poland) Włodzimierz Lubański
- 1986–89: (Belgium) Rik Pauwels
- 1989–90: (Belgium) Raoul Peeters
- 1990–91: (Belgium) Guy Mangelschots
- 1991–92: (Belgium) Albert Van Marcke
- 1992–93: (Belgium) Jan Ceuleers/ (Belgium) Piet Demol
- 1992–93: (Belgium) Piet Demol
- 1993–94: (Belgium) Piet Demol/ (Belgium) Rik Pauwels
- 1994–97: (Belgium) Albert Van Marcke
- 1998–98: (Belgium) Marc Huysmans
- 1998–98: (Belgium) Albert Van Marcke
- 1998–98: (Georgia (country)) David Kipiani/ (Belgium) Albert Van Marcke
- 1999–01: (Belgium) Patrick Hantson
- 2001–03: (Belgium) Marc Ghys
- 2003–04: (Belgium) Marc Ghys/{ (Belgium) Joël Crahay
- 2004–05: (Belgium) Joël Crahay/ (Belgium) Patrick Asselman
- 2005–06: (Belgium) Patrick Asselman/ (England) Colin Andrews
- 2006–07: (England) Colin Andrews
- 2007–09: (Belgium) Regi Van Acker
- 2009–10: (Belgium) Regi Van Acker/ (Belgium) Luc Leys/ (Netherlands) Danny Hoekman/ (Belgium) Marc Ghys
- 2010–11: (Belgium) Raoul Peeters
- 2011–12: (Belgium) Marc Ghys/ (Senegal) Sadio Ba
- 2012–: (Belgium) Thierry Pister
