= Albert Bers =

Belgian footballer and football coach (1931–2021)

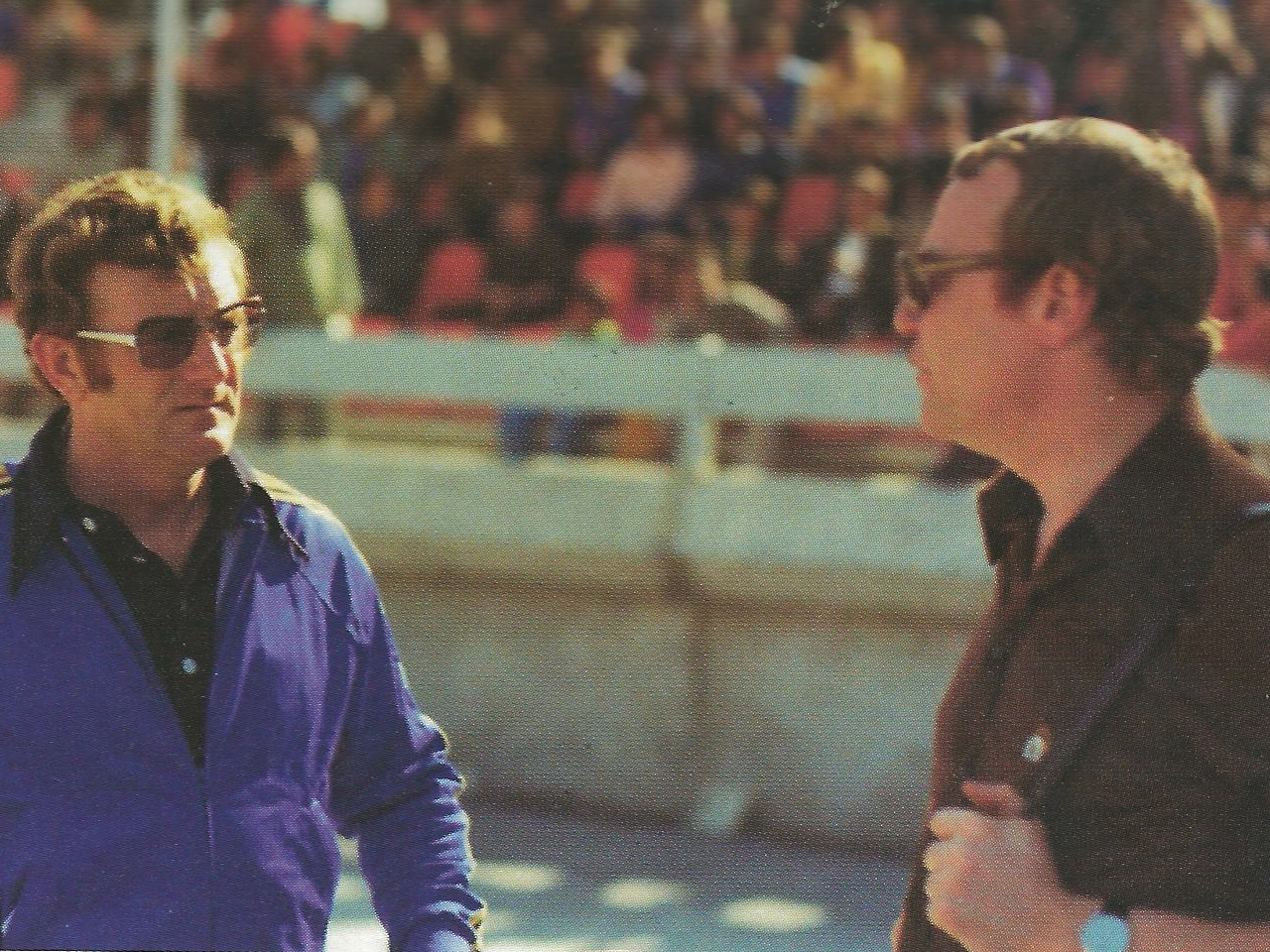
- Bers in 1977

Personal information
- Date of birth: 11 December 1931
- Place of birth: Sint-Truiden, Belgium
- Date of death: 25 February 2021 (aged 89)
- Place of death: Genk, Belgium
- Position: Defender

Senior career*
Years	Team	Apps	(Gls)
- Sint-Truiden
- * Club domestic league appearances and goals

Albert Bers (11 December 1931 – 25 February 2021) was a Belgian football player and coach. He became the first coach of the Belgium women's national football team in 1976 and was the coach until 1990. He became also coach of several Belgian clubs, including K.R.C. Mechelen. He was footballer for among others Sint-Truidense V.V.

Bers died in Genk on 25 February 2021, aged 89.
