= Rod Dickinson =

British artist

Rod Dickinson (born 1965) is a British artist.

== Biography ==
Dickinson initially trained as a painter. He first gained note in the 1990s for his work involving the creation of crop circles in the UK. He made his first crop circle in 1991, when the interest in extraterrestrial visits was at its height, and has subsequently completed more than 500 of them. In 2004 he graduated from circles made with cereal crops and created an ambitious design made using sand, followed by a BBC film crew and a helicopter.

In 2002 he organised The Milgram Obedience Experiment in Glasgow, Scotland, involving reenactment by actors to explore Dickinson's fascination with belief systems and social systems. The Observer described the work as "too literal to be theatre, and too darkly strange to fit into the historical battles' re-enactment genre... his work comes closest to the dread realm of performance art."
