= Kasım Yıldız =

Turkish footballer (born 1980)

Personal information
- Date of birth: 10 October 1980 (age 46)
- Place of birth: Sorgun, Yozgat, Turkey
- Height: 1.72 m (5 ft 8 in)
- Position: Midfielder

Senior career*
Years	Team	Apps	(Gls)
1998–2002	Metz B		
2001–2002	Metz	4	(0)
2002–2003	FC Martigues		
2005	AC Allianssi	11	(0)
2006–2011	CSO Amnéville	60	(0)
2011–2015	Swift Hesperange		
- * Club domestic league appearances and goals

Kasım Yıldız (born 10 October 1980) is a Turkish former professional footballer who played as a midfielder.

== Career ==
Yıldız was born in Sorgun, Yozgat, Turkey.

He made his professional debut in Ligue 1 for FC Metz. He played in the 2005–06 UEFA Cup for Finnish club AC Allianssi. In 2006 he signed with Championnat de France amateur side CSO Amnéville.

In June 2011, Yıldız moved to Luxembourg joining FC Swift Hesperange.

In January 2015, having retired from professional football, he joined Division d'Honneur side Trémery.
