= Raoul Peeters =

Belgian football manager (1947–2025)

Personal information
- Date of birth: 1 January 1947
- Place of birth: Mechelen, Belgium
- Date of death: 6 September 2025 (aged 78)
- Position: Midfielder

Senior career*
Years	Team	Apps	(Gls)
1965–1977	Duffel		

Managerial career
- 1975–1977: Racing Mechelen (assistant)
- 1977–1981: Racing Mechelen
- 1981–1982: Berchem Sport (assistant)
- 1982–1983: Berchem Sport
- 1983–1987: Duffel
- 1989–1990: Racing Mechelen
- 1990–1995: Oostende
- 1995: Beerschot
- 1996–1997: Sint-Niklaas
- 1997–1999: Herentals
- 1999–2001: Turnhout
- 2001–2002: Roeselare
- 2003: Oostende
- 2004–2006: Rupel Boom
- 2006–2008: Duffel
- 2009–2010: Olympia Wilrijk
- 2010–2011: Racing Mechelen
- 2016–2017: Duffel
- * Club domestic league appearances and goals

Raoul Peeters (1 January 1947 – 6 September 2025) is a Belgian former football player and manager. He died on 6 September 2025, at the age of 78.
