= Crop circle =

Pattern in a crop field

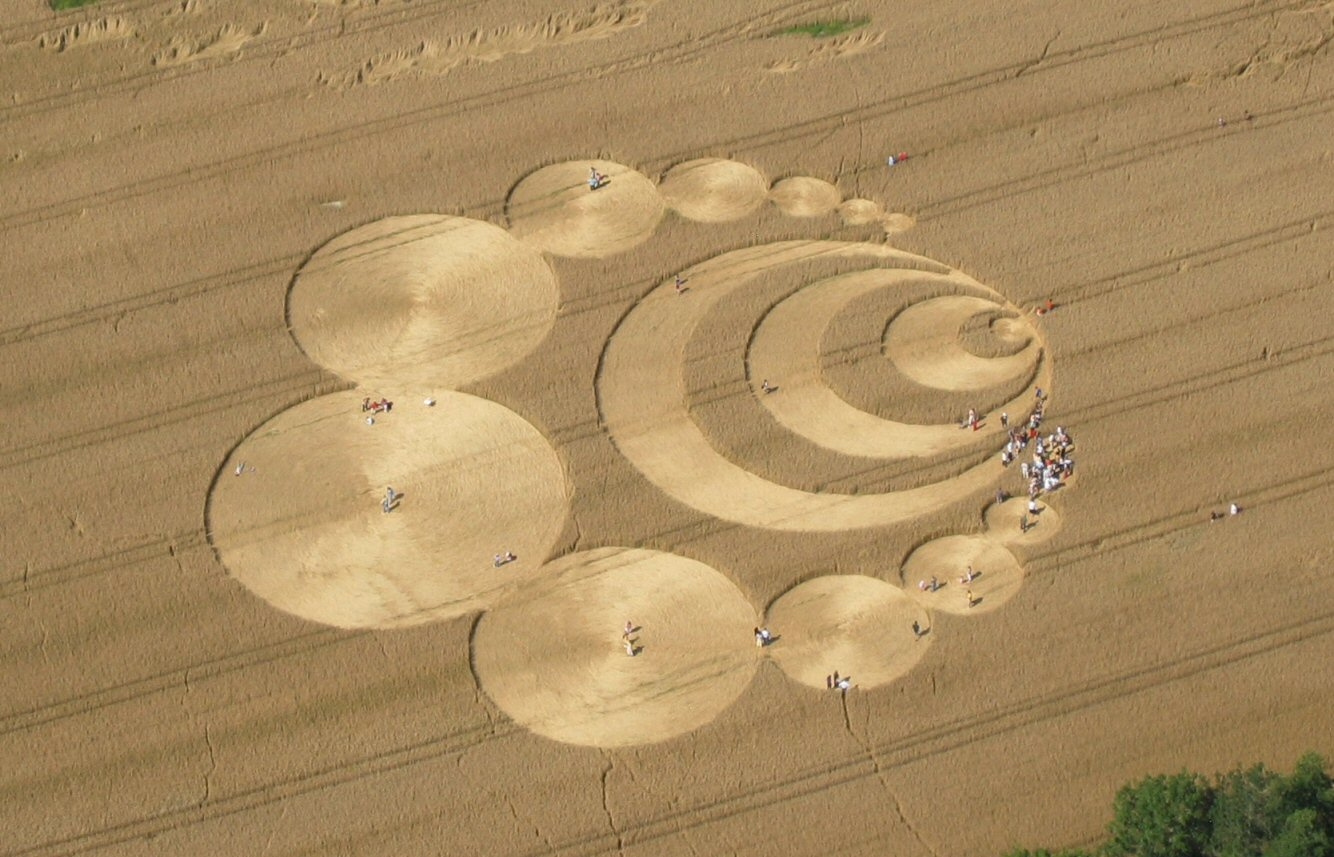
Aerial view of crop circles in Switzerland

A crop circle, crop formation, or corn circle is a pattern created by flattening a crop, usually a cereal. The term was coined in the early 1980s. Crop circles have been described as all falling "within the range of the sort of thing done in hoaxes" by Taner Edis, professor of physics at Truman State University.

Although obscure natural causes or alien origins of crop circles are suggested by fringe theorists, there is no scientific evidence for such explanations, and all crop circles are consistent with human causation. In 1991, two hoaxers, Doug Bower and Dave Chorley, took credit for having created over 200 crop circles throughout England in widely-reported interviews. The number of reports of crop circles increased substantially after interviews with them. In the United Kingdom, reported circles are not distributed randomly across the landscape, but appear near roads, areas of medium to dense population, and cultural heritage monuments, such as Stonehenge or Avebury. They usually appear overnight. Nearly half of all crop circles found in the UK in 2003 were located within a 15 km (9.3 mi) radius of the Avebury stone circles.

In contrast to crop circles or crop formations, archaeological remains can cause cropmarks in the fields in the shapes of circles and squares, but these do not appear overnight, and are always in the same places every year.

== History ==
=== Before the 20th century ===
A 1678 news pamphlet, The Mowing-Devil: or, Strange News Out of Hartfordshire, describes a crop whose stalks were cut rather than bent. (See folklore section.)

In 1686, an English naturalist, Robert Plot, reported on rings or arcs of mushrooms (see fairy rings) in The Natural History of Stafford-Shire, proposing air flows from the sky as a cause. In 1991, meteorologist Terence Meaden linked this report with modern crop circles, a claim that has been compared with those made by Erich von Däniken. (Note: Keving Greene wrote, The difficulties that exist in communicating the results of archaeology have undoubtedly contributed to the flourishing of writers, such as Erich von Däniken, who take a particular delight in deriding the inability of 'experts' to find explanations that seize the imagination of the public. ... Few archaeologists have sold as many paperbacks as von Däniken; more recently, a meteorologist who linked crop circles to prehistoric ring-ditches or round barrows generated a reaction that no orthodox student of these monuments has ever achieved (Meaden 1991) [in reference to T. Meaden (1991). The Goddess of the Stones: The Language of the Megaliths. London: Souvenir Press.])

An 1880 letter to the editor of Nature by amateur scientist John Rand Capron describes how several circles of flattened crops in a field were formed under suspicious circumstances and possibly caused by "cyclonic wind action", stating "as viewed from a distance, circular spots ... they all presented much the same character, viz, a few standing stalks as a centre, some prostrate stalks with their heads arranged pretty evenly in a direction forming a circle round the centre, and outside there a circular wall of stalks which had not suffered". (Note: John Rand Capron wrote, The storms about this part of Surrey have been lately local and violent, and the effects produced in some instances curious. Visiting a neighbour's farm on Wednesday evening (21st), we found a field of standing wheat considerably knocked about, not as an entirety, but in patches forming, as viewed from a distance, circular spots ... they all presented much the same character, viz, a few standing stalks as a centre, some prostrate stalks with their heads arranged pretty evenly in a direction forming a circle round the centre, and outside there a circular wall of stalks which had not suffered. ... I could not trace locally any circumstances accounting for the peculiar forms of the patches in the field, nor indicating whether it was wind or rain, or both combined, which had caused them, beyond the general evidence everywhere of heavy rainfall. They were suggestive to me of some cyclonic wind action, and may perhaps have been noticed elsewhere by some of your readers.)

=== 20th century ===
In 1932, archaeologist E. C. Curwen observed four dark rings in a field at Stoughton Down near Chichester, but could examine only one: "a circle in which the barley was 'lodged' or beaten down, while the interior area was very slightly mounded up."

In Fortean Times, David Wood reported that in 1940 he made crop circles near Gloucestershire using ropes.

In 1963, Patrick Moore described a crater in a potato field in Wiltshire that he considered was probably caused by an unknown meteoric body. In nearby wheat fields, there were several circular and elliptical areas where the wheat had been flattened. There was evidence of "spiral flattening". He thought they could be caused by air currents from the impact, since they led towards the crater. Astronomer Hugh Ernest Butler observed similar craters and said they were likely caused by lightning strikes.

During the 1960s, there were many reports of UFO sightings and circular formations in swamp reeds and sugarcane fields in Tully, Queensland, Australia, and in Canada. For example, on 8 August 1967, three circles were found in a field in Duhamel, Alberta, Canada; Department of National Defence investigators concluded that it was artificial but couldn't say who made them or how. The most famous case is the 1966 Tully "saucer nest", when a farmer said he witnessed a saucer-shaped craft rise 9 or 12 m (30 or 40 ft) from a swamp and then fly away. On investigating he found a nearly circular area 10 m (32 ft) long by 8 m (25 ft) wide where the grass was flattened in clockwise curves to water level within the circle, and the reeds had been uprooted from the mud. The local police officer, the Royal Australian Air Force, and the University of Queensland concluded that it was most probably caused by natural causes, like a down draught, a willy-willy (dust devil), or a waterspout. In 1973, G.J. Odgers, Director of Public Relations, Department of Defence (Air Office), wrote to a journalist that the "saucer" was probably debris lifted by a willy-willy.

After the 1960s, there was a surge of UFOlogists in Wiltshire, and there were rumours of "saucer nests" appearing in the area, but they were never photographed. There are other pre-1970s reports of circular formations, especially in Australia and Canada, but they were always simple circles, which could have been caused by whirlwinds.

British pranksters Doug Bower and Dave Chorley reported they started creating crop circles in British cornfields in 1978, inspired by the Tully "saucer nest" case.

The first film to depict a geometric crop circle, in this case created by super-intelligent ants, was the 1974 science-fiction film Phase IV. The film has been cited as a possible inspiration or influence on the pranksters who started this phenomenon.

The majority of reports of crop circles have appeared and spread since the late 1970s as many circles began appearing throughout the English countryside. Around this time, researcher Colin Andrews began documenting the phenomenon, and in 1989 he co-authored Circular Evidence with Pat Delgado, a work that compiled reports and photographs of early formations. This phenomenon became widely known in the late 1980s, after the media started to report crop circles in Hampshire and Wiltshire. After Bower and Chorley gave interviews in 1991 about how they had made crop circles, circles started appearing all over the world. By 2001, approximately 10,000 crop circles have been reported internationally, from locations such as the former Soviet Union, the United Kingdom, Japan, the U.S., and Canada. Researchers have noted a correlation between crop circles, recent media coverage, and the absence of fencing and/or anti-trespassing legislation.

Although farmers expressed concern at the damage caused to their crops, local response to the appearance of crop circles was often enthusiastic, with locals taking advantage of the increase of tourism and visits from scientists, crop circle researchers, and individuals seeking spiritual experiences. The market for crop circle interest consequently generated bus or helicopter tours of circle sites, walking tours, T-shirts, and book sales.

=== 21st century ===
Since the start of the 21st century, crop formations have increased in size and complexity, with some featuring as many as 2,000 different shapes and some incorporating complex mathematical and scientific characteristics.

The researcher Jeremy Northcote found that crop circles in the UK in 2002 were not spread randomly across the landscape. They tended to appear near roads, areas of medium-to-dense population, and cultural heritage monuments such as Stonehenge or Avebury. He found that they always appeared in areas that were easy to access. This suggests strongly that these crop circles were more likely to be caused by intentional human action than by paranormal activity. Another strong indication of that theory was that inhabitants of the zone with the most circles had a historical tendency for making large-scale formations, including stone circles such as Stonehenge, earthen mounds such as Silbury Hill, long barrows such as West Kennet Long Barrow, and white horses in chalk hills.

== Bower and Chorley ==
In 1991, two self-professed pranksters, Doug Bower and Dave Chorley, made headlines by saying they had started the crop circle phenomenon in 1978, using simple tools consisting of a plank of wood, rope, and a baseball cap fitted with a loop of wire to help them walk in straight lines. To prove their case they made a circle in front of journalists; a "cereologist" (advocate of paranormal explanations of crop circles), Pat Delgado, examined the circle and declared it authentic before it was revealed that it was a hoax.

Inspired by Australian crop circle accounts from 1966, Bower and Chorley claimed to be responsible for all circles made prior to 1987, and for more than 200 crop circles in 1978–1991 (with 1,000 other circles not being made by them). Writing in Physics World, Richard Taylor of the University of Oregon said that "the pictographs they created inspired a second wave of crop artists. Far from fizzling out, crop circles have evolved into an international phenomenon, with hundreds of sophisticated pictographs now appearing annually around the globe."

== Art and business ==
After reports of simple circles in the 1970s, increasingly complex geometric designs have been created by anonymous artists, in some cases to attract tourists to an area.

Since the early 1990s, the UK arts collective Circlemakers, founded by Rod Dickinson and John Lundberg, and subsequently including Wil Russell and Rob Irving, has been creating crop circles in the UK and around the world as part of its art practice and also for commercial clients.

The Led Zeppelin Boxed Set that was released on 7 September 1990, along with the remasters of the first boxed set, as well as the second boxed set, all feature an image of a crop circle that appeared in East Field in Alton Barnes, Wiltshire.

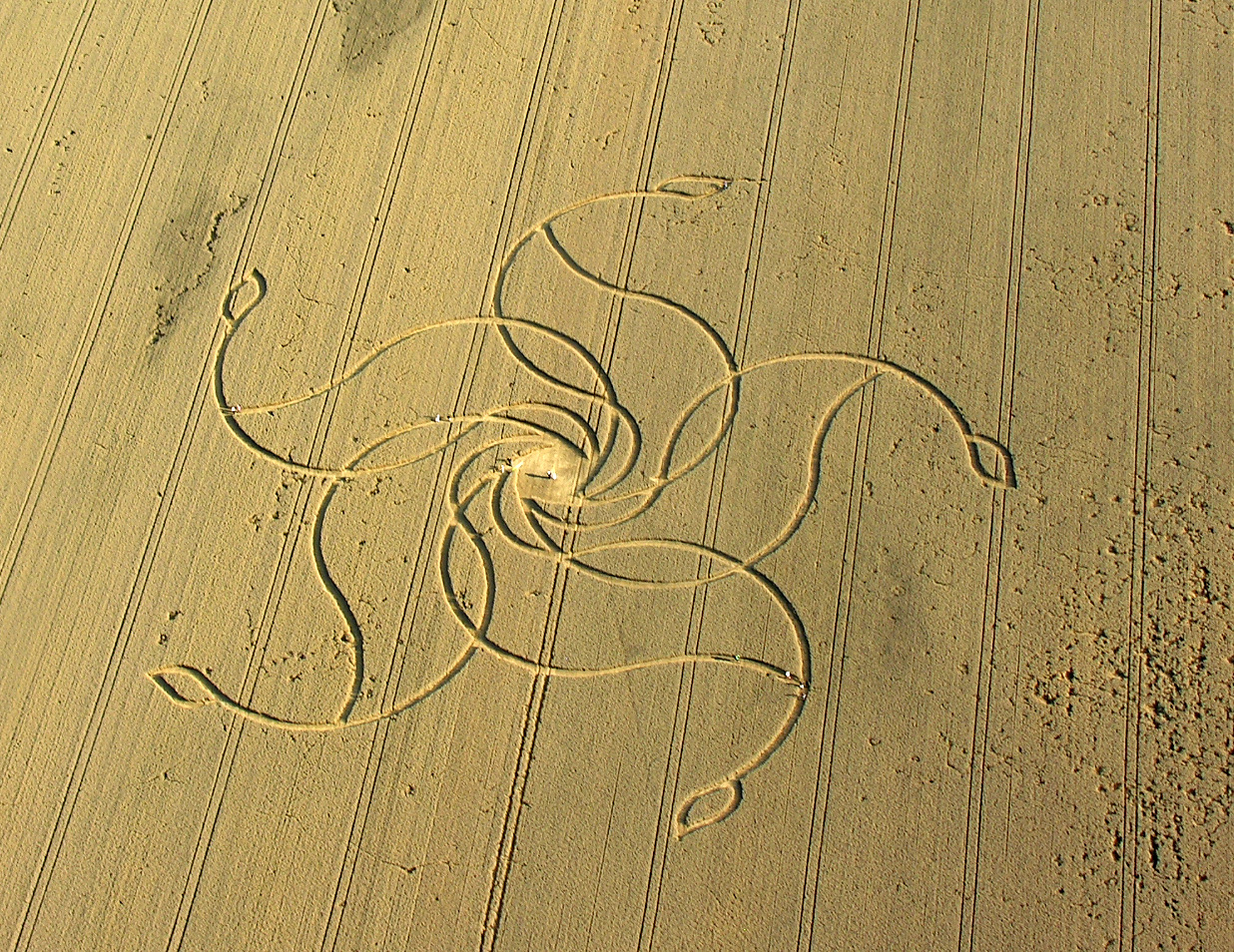
Aerial view of a crop circle in Diessenhofen

On the night of 11–12 July 1992, a crop-circle-making competition with a prize of £3,000 (funded in part by the Arthur Koestler Foundation) was held in Berkshire. The winning entry was produced by three Westland Helicopters engineers, using rope, PVC pipe, a plank, string, a telescopic device and two stepladders. According to Rupert Sheldrake, the competition was organised by him and John Michell and "co-sponsored by The Guardian and The Cerealogist". The prize money came from PM, a German magazine. Sheldrake wrote that "The experiment was conclusive. Humans could indeed make all the features of state-of-the-art crop formations at that time. Eleven of the twelve teams made more or less impressive formations that followed the set design."

In 2002, Discovery Channel commissioned five aeronautics and astronautics graduate students from MIT to create crop circles of their own, aiming to duplicate some of the features claimed to distinguish "real" crop circles from the known fakes such as those created by Bower and Chorley. The creation of the circle was recorded and used in the Discovery Channel documentary Crop Circles: Mysteries in the Fields.

In 2009, The Guardian reported that crop circle activity had been waning around Wiltshire, in part because makers preferred creating promotional crop circles for companies that paid well for their efforts.

A video sequence used in connection with the opening of the 2012 Summer Olympics in London showed two crop circles in the shape of the Olympic rings. Another Olympic crop circle was visible to passengers landing at nearby Heathrow Airport before and during the Games.

A 3 ha (7 acres) crop circle depicting the emblem of the Star Wars Rebel Alliance was created in California in December 2017 by a father and his 11-year-old son as a spaceport for X-wing fighters.

== Legal implications ==
In 1992, Gábor Takács and Róbert Dallos, both then aged 17, were the first people to face legal action after creating a crop circle. Takács and Dallos, of the St. Stephen Agricultural Technicum, a high school in Hungary specializing in agriculture, created a 36 m (118 ft) diameter crop circle in a wheat field near Székesfehérvár, 69 km (43 mi) southwest of Budapest, on 8 June 1992. In September, the pair appeared on Hungarian TV and exposed the circle as a hoax, showing photos of the field before and after the circle was made. As a result, Aranykalász Co., the owners of the land, sued the teens for 630,000 Ft (~$3,000 USD) in damages. The presiding judge ruled that the students were only responsible for the damage caused in the circle itself, amounting to about 6,000 Ft (~$30 USD), and that 99% of the damage to the crops was caused by the thousands of visitors who flocked to Székesfehérvár following the media's promotion of the circle. The fine was eventually paid by the TV show, as were the students' legal fees.

In 2000, Matthew Williams became the first man in the UK to be arrested for causing criminal damage after making a crop circle near Devizes. In November 2000, he was fined £100 plus £40 in costs. As of 2008, no one else has been successfully prosecuted in the UK for criminal damage caused by creating crop circles. (Note: In a newspaper article Lewis Cohen wrote, "Williams is probably best known as the only person in the UK to be successfully prosecuted for making crop circles. He has since made a name for himself creating crop circles for TV companies and commercial firms...")

== Creation ==
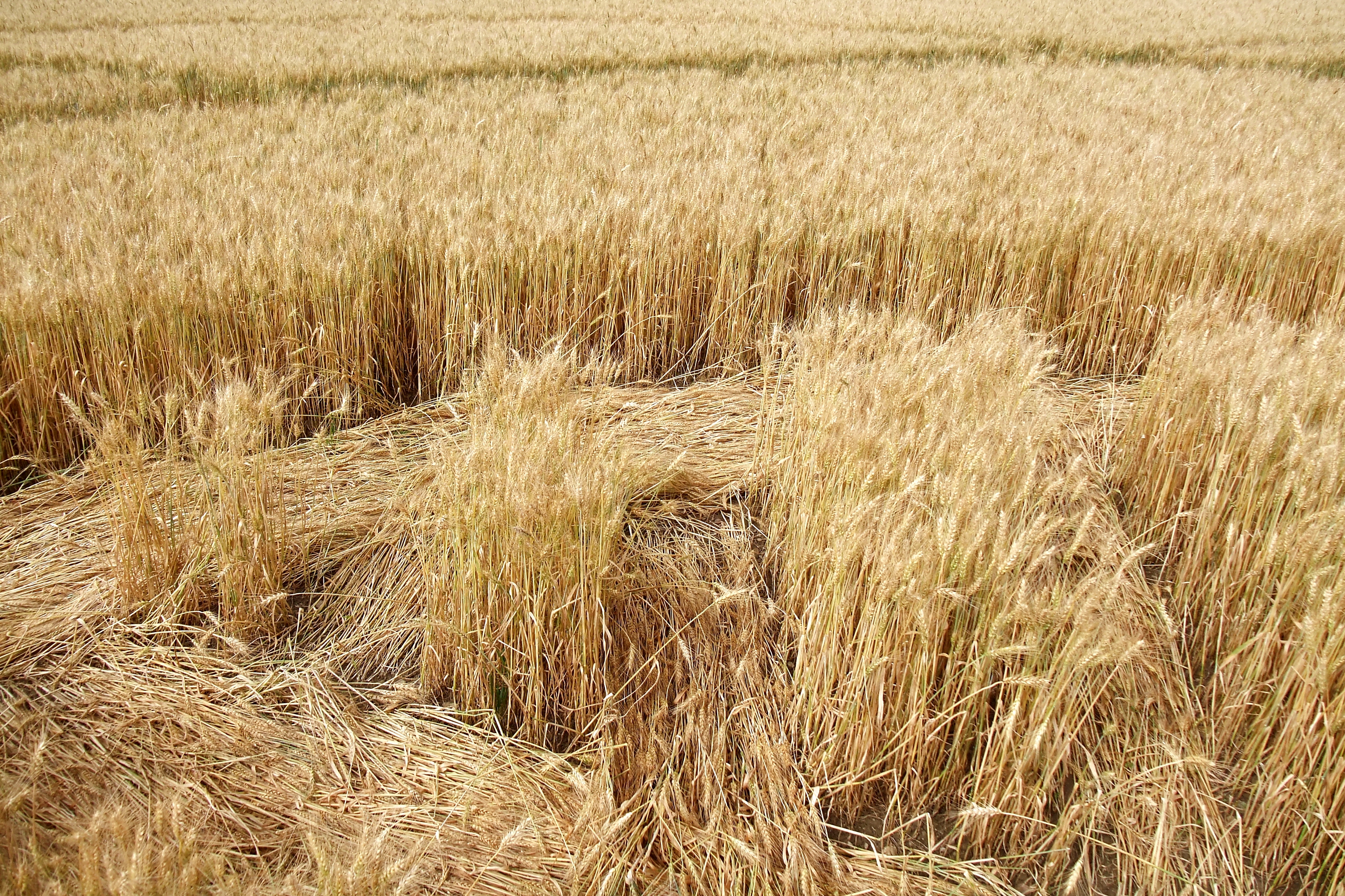
Detail of a crop circle in a field in Switzerland

=== Human origin ===
The scientific consensus on crop circles is that they are constructed by human beings as hoaxes, advertising, or art. The most widely known method for a person or group to construct a crop formation is to tie one end of a rope to an anchor point and the other end to a board which is used to crush the plants. It is also possible to bend grass without breaking it, if it has recently rained—a method that was used to create crop circles in Hungary in 1992. Skeptics of the paranormal point out that all characteristics of crop circles are fully compatible with their being made by hoaxers.

Bower and Chorley confessed in 1991 to making the first crop circles in southern England. When some people refused to believe them, they deliberately added straight lines and squares to show that they could not have natural causes. In a copycat effect, increasingly complex circles started appearing in many countries around the world, including fractal figures. Physicists have suggested that the most complex formations might be made with the help of GPS and lasers. In 2009, a circle formation was made over the course of three consecutive nights and was apparently left unfinished, with some half-made circles.

The main criticism of alleged non-human creation of crop circles is that while evidence of these origins, besides eyewitness testimonies, is absent, many are definitely known to be the work of human pranksters, and others can be adequately explained as such. There have been cases in which researchers declared crop circles to be "the real thing", only to be confronted with the people who created the circle and documented the fraud, such as Bower and Chorley and tabloid Today hoaxing Pat Delgado, the Wessex Sceptics and Channel 4's Equinox hoaxing Terence Meaden, or a friend of a Canadian farmer hoaxing a field researcher of the Canadian Crop Circle Research Network. In his 1995 book The Demon-Haunted World: Science as a Candle in the Dark, Carl Sagan concludes that crop circles were created by Bower and Chorley and their copycats, and speculates that UFOlogists willingly ignore the evidence for hoaxing so they can keep believing in an extraterrestrial origin of the circles. Many others have demonstrated how complex crop circles can be created. Scientific American published an article by Matt Ridley, who started making crop circles in northern England in 1991. He wrote about how easy it is to develop techniques using simple tools that can easily fool later observers. He reported on "expert" sources such as The Wall Street Journal who had been easily fooled, and mused about why people want to believe supernatural explanations for phenomena that are not yet explained. Methods of creating a crop circle are now well documented on the Internet.

Some crop formations are paid for by companies who use them as advertising. Many crop circles show human symbols, like the heart and arrow symbol of love, and stereotyped alien faces. (Note: The website Crop Circle Research.com described one formation stating, "It looks reminiscent of a fake dummy constructed by 'Balok' in a Star Trek episode called 'Corbomite Manourvre' [sic] (series 1)' or the logo of local soccer club Feyenoord".)

Hoaxers have been caught in the process of making new circles, such as in 2004 in the Netherlands.

=== Natural origins ===
==== Weather ====
It has been suggested that crop circles may be the result of extraordinary meteorological phenomena ranging from freak tornadoes to ball lightning, but there is no evidence of any crop circle being created by any of these causes.

In 1880, an amateur scientist, John Rand Capron, wrote a letter to the editor of journal Nature about some circles in crops and blamed them on a recent storm, saying their shape was "suggestive of some cyclonic wind action".

In 1980, Terence Meaden, a meteorologist and physicist, proposed that the circles were caused by whirlwinds whose course was affected by southern England hills. As circles became more complex, Terence had to create increasingly complex theories, blaming an electromagneto-hydrodynamic "plasma vortex". The meteorological theory became popular, and it was even referenced in 1991 by physicist Stephen Hawking who said that, "Corn circles are either hoaxes or formed by vortex movement of air". The weather theory suffered a serious blow in 1991, but Hawking's point about hoaxes was supported when Bower and Chorley stated that they had been responsible for making all those circles. (Note: In a Physics World article Richard Taylor wrote, "Today, with the benefit of hindsight, such explanations sound rather contrived. At the height of the debate, though, no less a physicist than Stephen Hawking was prepared to accept some version of Meaden's theory. When a spate of circles appeared in the countryside near his Cambridge home in 1991, Hawking told a local newspaper that "crop circles are either hoaxes or formed by vortex movement of air") By the end of 1991 Meaden conceded that those circles that had complex designs were made by hoaxers.

==== Animal activity ====
In 2009, the attorney general for the island state of Tasmania stated that Australian wallabies had been found creating crop circles in fields of opium poppies, which are grown legally for medicinal use, after consuming some of the opiate-laden poppies and running in circles.

=== Alternative explanations ===
In science magazines from the 1980s and 1990s, for example Science Illustrated, one could read reports suggesting that the plants were bent by something that could be microwave radiation, rather than broken by physical impact. The magazines also contained serious reports of the absence of human influence and measurement of unusual radiation. Today, this is considered to be pseudoscience, while at the time it was subject of serious research. At that time, it was also more likely that an unknown factor was behind the incidents, not least seen in light of the fact that GPS was not available to the public.

==== Paranormal ====
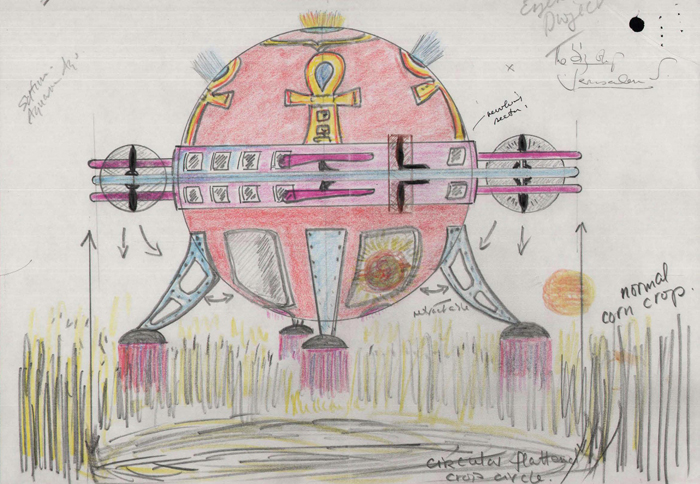
Sketch of a "spaceship" creating crop circles, sent to UK Ministry of Defence circa 1998

Since becoming the focus of widespread media attention in the 1980s, crop circles have been the subject of speculation by various paranormal, ufological, and anomalistic investigators, ranging from proposals that they were created by bizarre meteorological phenomena to messages from extraterrestrial beings. There has also been speculation that crop circles have a relation to ley lines.

Some paranormal advocates think that crop circles are caused by ball lightning and that the patterns are so complex that they have to be controlled by some entity. Some proposed entities are Gaia asking to stop global warming and human pollution, God, supernatural beings (for example Indian devas), the collective minds of humanity through a proposed "quantum field", and extraterrestrial beings.

Responding to local beliefs that "extraterrestrial beings" in UFOs were responsible for crop circles appearing, the Indonesian National Institute of Aeronautics and Space (LAPAN) described crop circles as "man-made". Thomas Djamaluddin, research professor of astronomy and astrophysics at LAPAN stated, "We have come to agree that this 'thing' cannot be scientifically proven." Among others, paranormal enthusiasts, ufologists, and anomalistic investigators have offered hypothetical explanations that have been criticised as pseudoscientific by sceptical groups and scientists, including the Committee for Skeptical Inquiry. No credible evidence of extraterrestrial origin has been presented.

==== Changes to crops ====
A small number of scientists (physicist Eltjo Haselhoff, the late biophysicist William Levengood) have claimed to observe differences between the crops inside the circles and outside them, citing this as evidence they were not man made. Levengood published papers in journal Physiologia Plantarum in 1994 and 1999. In his 1994 paper he found that certain deformities in the grain inside the circles were correlated to the position of the grain inside the circle.

In 1996, Joe Nickell objected that correlation is not causation, raising several objections to Levengood's methods and assumptions, and said, "Until his work is independently replicated by qualified scientists doing 'double-blind' studies and otherwise following stringent scientific protocols, there seems no need to take seriously the many dubious claims that Levengood makes, including his similar ones involving plants at alleged 'cattle mutilation' sites." Nickell also criticised Levengood for using circular logic, stating: "There is, in fact, no satisfactory evidence that a single 'genuine' (i.e., vortex-produced) crop-circle exists, so Levengood's reasoning is circular: Although there are no guaranteed genuine formations on which to conduct research, the research supposedly proves the genuineness of the formations."

Advocates of non-human causes discount on-site evidence of human involvement as attempts to discredit the phenomena. When Ridley wrote negative articles in newspapers, he was accused of spreading "government disinformation" and of working for the UK military intelligence service MI5. Ridley responded by noting that many "cereologists" make good livings from selling books and providing high-priced personal tours through crop fields, and he claimed that they have vested interests in rejecting what is by far the most likely explanation for the circles.

== Related art ==
Patterns similar to crop circles can also be made in snow, by using skis, snow shoes or just walking with ordinary shoes.

Images can be made in forests by cutting trees, especially in areas with snow. Celebrating the Olympic Games in Lillehammer, Norway in 1994, a 360 m (390 yd) tall stylised image of an Olympic torch runner was made in a forest close to one of the arenas.

== Folklore ==
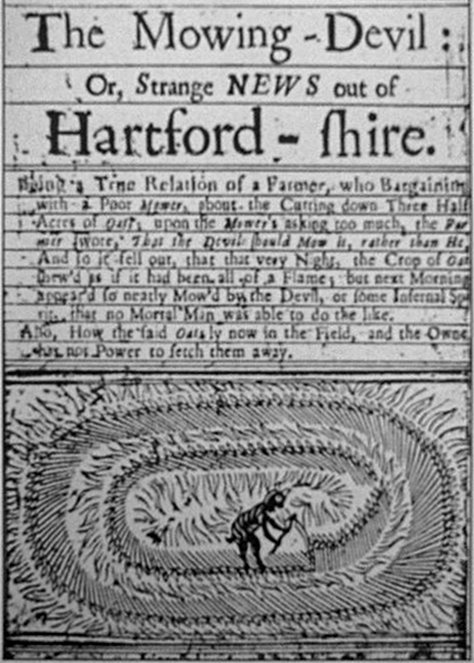
1678 pamphlet on the "Mowing-Devil"

Researchers of crop circles have linked modern crop circles to old folkloric tales to support the claim that they are not artificially produced. Crop circles are culture dependent: they appear mostly in developed and secularised Western countries where people are receptive to New Age beliefs, including Japan, but they do not appear at all in other zones, such as Muslim countries.

Fungi can cause circular areas of crop to die, probably the origin of tales of "fairie rings". Tales also mention balls of light many times but never in relation to crop circles.

A 17th-century English woodcut called the Mowing-Devil depicts the devil with a scythe mowing (cutting) a circular design in a field of oats. The pamphlet containing the image states that the farmer, disgusted at the wage demanded by his mower for his work, insisted that he would rather have "the devil himself" perform the task. Crop circle researcher Jim Schnabel does not consider this to be a historical precedent for crop circles because the stalks were cut down, not bent. The circular form indicated to the farmer that it had been caused by the devil.

In the 1948 German story Die zwölf Schwäne (The Twelve Swans), a farmer every morning finds a circular ring of flattened grain in his field. After several attempts, his son sees twelve princesses disguised as swans, who take off their disguises and dance in the field. Crop rings produced by fungi may have inspired such tales, since folklore considers that these rings are created by dancing wolves or fairies.

== See also ==
- Arecibo Answer crop circle
- Benjamin Creme
- Geoglyph
- Kosmopoisk
- Land art
- List of hoaxes
- Nazca Lines
- Rice paddy art
