= Rik Pauwels =

Belgian football manager (1937–2025)

- Pauwels with Beveren

Personal information
- Date of birth: 13 March 1937
- Place of birth: Belgium
- Date of death: 23 September 2025 (aged 88)
- Position: Goalkeeper

Senior career*
| Years | Team | Apps | (Gls) |
| 1962–1963 | Tubantia Borgerhout | | |
| 1971–1976 | SK 's Gravenwezel-Schilde | | |

Managerial career
- 1971–1976: SK 's Gravenwezel-Schilde
- 1976–1978: Berchem Sport (assistant)
- 1978–1981: KSK Beveren (assistant)
- 1981–1982: Waterschei Thor
- 1982–1984: KSK Beveren (assistant)
- 1984–1986: KSK Beveren
- 1986–1989: Racing Mechelen
- 1989–1990: KSK Beveren
- 1990–1991: K Boom FC
- 1993–1994: Racing Mechelen
- * Club domestic league appearances and goals

Rik Pauwels (13 March 1937 – 23 September 2025) was a Belgian football manager and player.

== Biography ==
A goalkeeper, Pauwels played for Tubantia Borgerhout and was a player-coach for SK 's Gravenwezel-Schilde. He served as an assistant for K. Berchem Sport and KSK Beverem before his first head coaching role at Waterschei Thor in 1981, with whom he won the Belgian Cup in 1982. He returned to KSK Beverem several times before leaving for good in January 1990. He replaced Leo Canjels at K Boom FC later that year before his retirement with Racing Mechelen in 1994.

Pauwels died on 23 September 2025, at the age of 88.
