= KSC Lokeren Oost-Vlaanderen =

Belgian former football club, based in Lokeren

Sporting Lokeren
- Full name: Koninklijke Sporting Club; Lokeren Oost-Vlaanderen
- Nickname: Tricolores
- Founded: 22 January 1923; 103 years ago
- Dissolved: 20 April 2020; 6 years ago
- Ground: Daknamstadion, Lokeren
- Capacity: 12,136
Home colours	Away colours	Third colours

Koninklijke Sporting Club Lokeren Oost-Vlaanderen (Dutch pronunciation: [ˈkoːnɪŋkləkə ˈspɔrtɪŋ ˌklʏp ˈloːkərən oːstˈflaːndərə(n), -rə ʔoː-]), often simply called Sporting Lokeren or Lokeren, was a Belgian professional football club based in the city of Lokeren, in the province of East Flanders. The club was founded in 1923 but ceased to exist in 2020 after going bankrupt. A few days after the bankruptcy, the club announced that rather than dissolving entirely, it would merge with KSV Temse to form Lokeren-Temse, starting in the Belgian Second Amateur Division (fourth level).

Lokeren first reached the first division in 1974–75. Since then, it had a short spell in the Second Division between 1993–94 and 1995–96. Lokeren had its most successful period in the 1980s, achieving second place in the league in 1980–81 as well as a Belgian Cup final the same year. Its best European result was reaching the quarter-final of the 1980–81 UEFA Cup. In the year 2000, the club merged with K Sint-Niklase SKE. They were registered to the Royal Belgian Football Association with the matricule number 282. Lokeren's colours were white, black and yellow. They played their home games at the Daknamstadion.

In 2012, Sporting Lokeren won the Belgian Cup, the club's first-ever honours, after beating KV Kortrijk in the Cup Final. They won their second Cup just two years later, after beating Zulte Waregem 1–0.

== History ==
The matricule No. 282 was given in 1920 to a club named Football Club Racing Club Lokeren (nicknamed Racing FC), but the team stopped its activity the next year. On 22 January 1923 Racing Club Lokeren was founded. Between 1945 and 1951, it had a slight name change (to Racing Athletiek- en Football Club Lokeren) and the new name since 1951 was Koninklijke Racing Club Lokeren. Due to financial problems, the fusion with the other team from the town (Koninklijke Standaard FC Lokeren) became necessary in 1970. The new club was then named Koninklijke Sporting Club Lokeren.

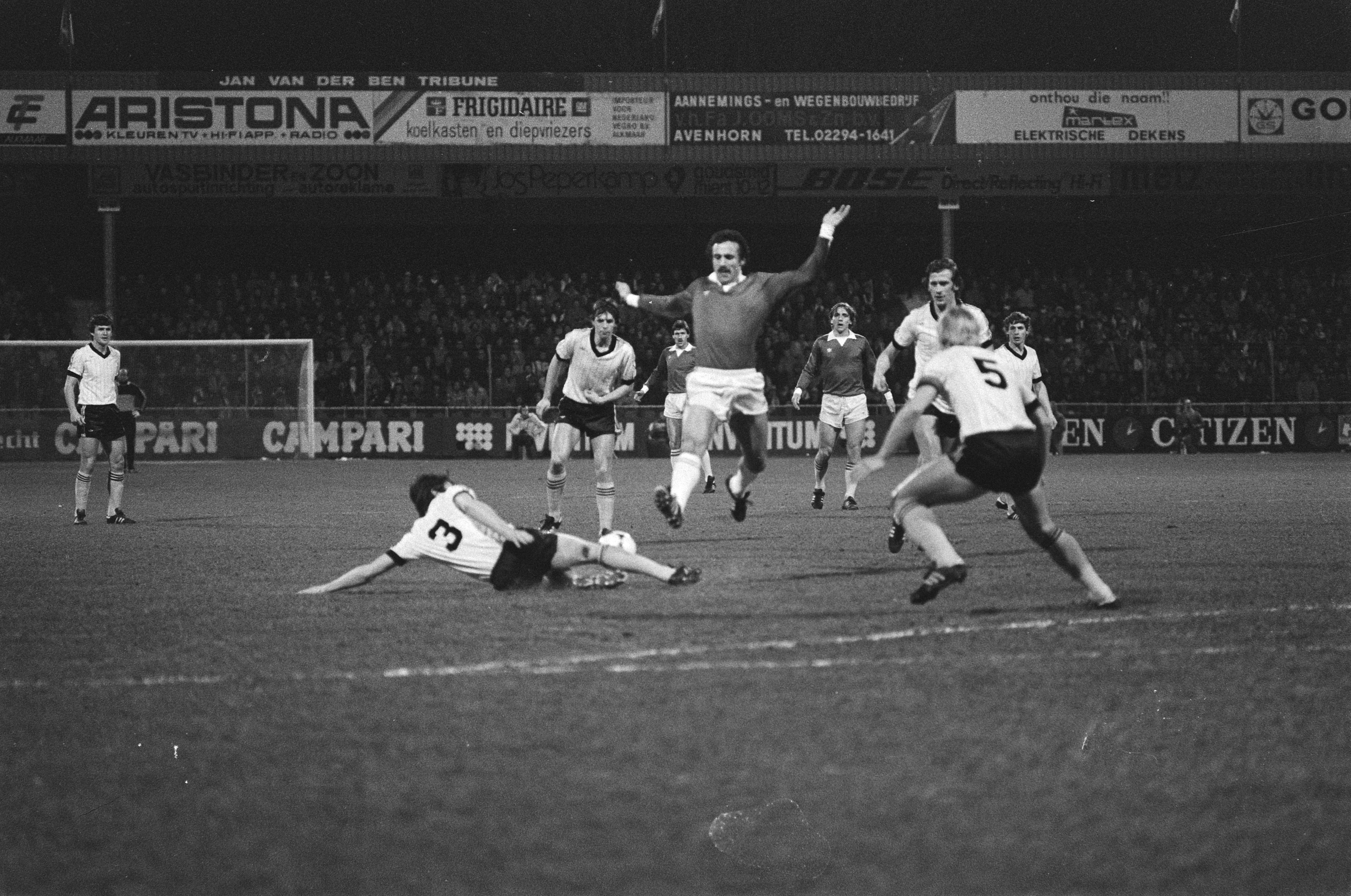
Away game against AZ in the 1980–81 UEFA Cup quarter finals

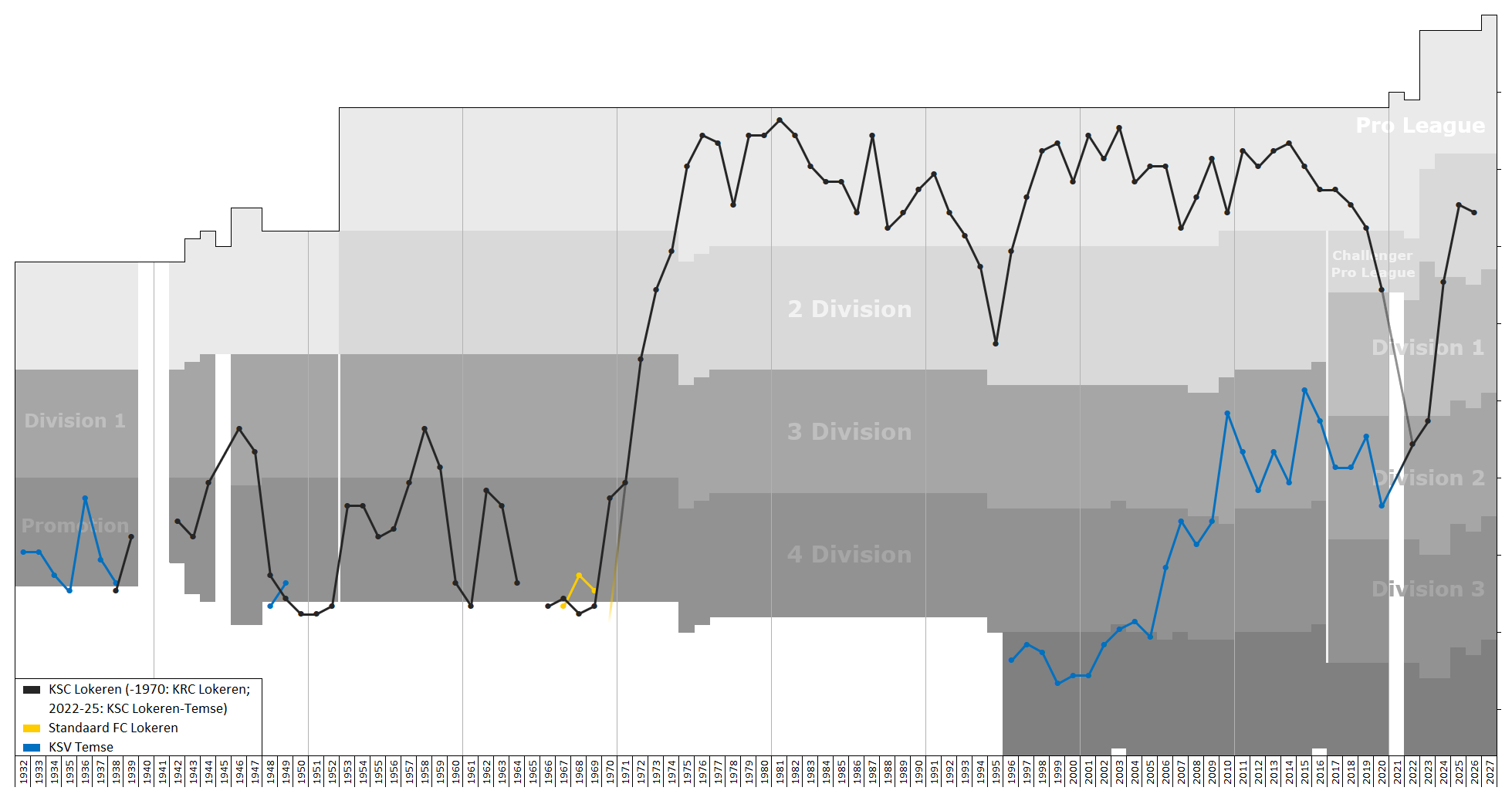
Historical chart of KSC Lokeren league performance

In 2000, the club merged with Koninklijke Sint-Niklaas SKE to form Sporting Lokeren Sint-Niklaas Waasland. The latest name change occurred in 2003, with the province name added to the club name.

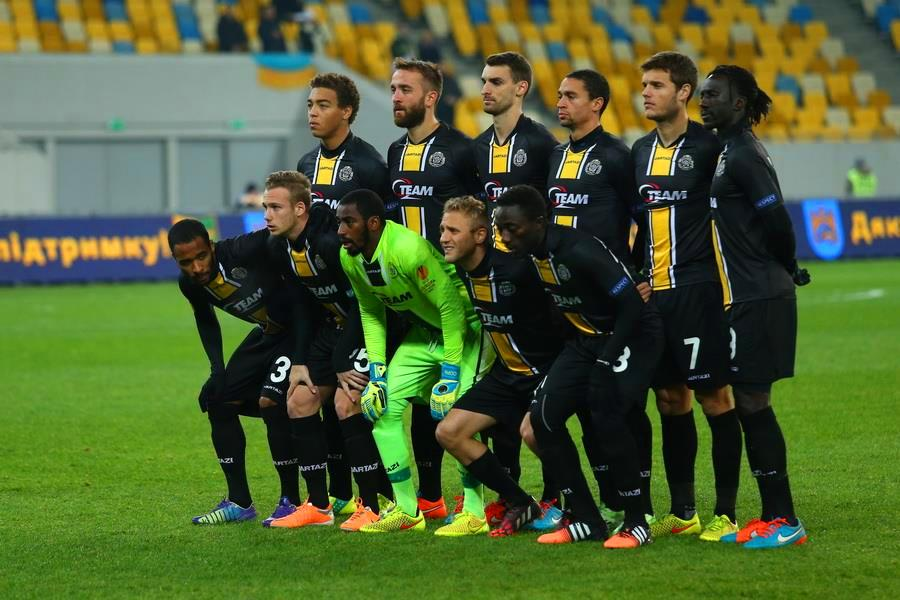
Starting eleven at a 2014–15 UEFA Europa League game

In 2018, Sporting Lokeren were relegated to the First Division B, the second tier of Belgian football. In 2019, the club was taken over by a group led by Louis de Vries and Alexander Janssen, taking the positions of president and CEO respectively.

On 20 April 2020, the club was declared bankrupt during the 2019–20 season. Lokeren had outstanding debts of €5 million and was not able to pay its staff and players anymore.

On 22 April 2020, Lokeren agreed to merge with KSV Temse to form a new club in KSC Lokeren-Temse and to start in the Second Amateur Division, the national fourth level.

== Honours ==
- Belgian First Division:
  - Runners-up (1): 1980–81
- Belgian Second Division:
  - Winners (1): 1995–96
- Belgian Cup:
  - Winners (2): 2011–12, 2013–14
  - Runners-up (1): 1980–81
- Belgian Super Cup:
  - Runners-up (2): 2012, 2014

== European record ==
Competition	A	GP	W	D	L	GF	GA
UEFA Cup/UEFA Europa League	8	38	16	10	12	46	37
UEFA Intertoto Cup	4	18	7	2	9	25	28

Season	Competition	Round		Club	Home	Away
1976–77	UEFA Cup	1R	(Luxembourg)	Red Boys Differdange	3–1	3–0
		2R	(Spain)	Barcelona	2–1	0–2
1980–81	UEFA Cup	1R	(Soviet Union)	Dynamo Moscow	1–1	1–0
		2R	(Scotland)	Dundee United	0–0	1–1
		3R	(Spain)	Real Sociedad	1–0	2–2
		QF	(Netherlands)	AZ 67 Alkmaar	1–0	0–2
1981–82	UEFA Cup	1R	(France)	Nantes	4–2	1–1
		2R	(Greece)	Aris Thessaloniki	4–0	1–1
		3R	(Germany)	1. FC Kaiserslautern	1–0	1–4
1982–83	UEFA Cup	1R	(Poland)	Stal Mielec	0–0	1–1
		2R	(Portugal)	Benfica	1–2	0–2
1987–88	UEFA Cup	1R	(Hungary)	Honvéd Budapest	0–0	0–1
1999	UEFA Intertoto Cup	2R	(Iceland)	IA Akranes	3–1	3–1
		3R	(France)	Metz	1–2	1–0
2001	UEFA Intertoto Cup	1R	(Faroe Islands)	B68 Toftir	0–0	4–2
		2R	(Poland)	Zagłębie Lubin	2–1	2–2
		3R	(England)	Newcastle United	0–4	0–1
2002	UEFA Intertoto Cup	1R	(Georgia (country))	WIT Georgia	3–1	2–3
		2R	(Germany)	VfB Stuttgart	0–1	0–2
2003–04	UEFA Cup	QUAL	(Albania)	Dinamo Tirana	3–1	4–0
		1R	(England)	Manchester City	0–1	2–3
2005	UEFA Intertoto Cup	1R	(Estonia)	Narva Trans	0–1	2–0
		2R	(Switzerland)	BSC Young Boys	1–4	1–2
2012–13	UEFA Europa League	PO	(Czech Republic)	Viktoria Plzeň	2–1	0–1
2014–15	UEFA Europa League	PO	(England)	Hull City	1–0	1–2
		Group	(Poland)	Legia Warsaw	1–0	0–1
		Group	(Ukraine)	Metalist Kharkiv	1–0	1–0
		Group	(Turkey)	Trabzonspor	1–1	0–2

== Final squad ==
Note: Flags indicate national team as defined under FIFA eligibility rules; some limited exceptions apply. Players may hold more than one non-FIFA nationality.

No.	Pos.	Nation	Player
2	DF	BEL	Stefano Marzo
3	DF	JPN	Ryuta Koike
5	MF	MLI	Abdoulaye Diaby (on loan from Antwerp)
6	MF	CIV	Lamine N'dao
7	MF	BEL	Killian Overmeire (captain)
8	MF	SEN	Abdou Diakhaté (on loan from Parma)
9	FW	BIH	Anel Hajrić
14	MF	JPN	Jun Amano
15	FW	GEO	Giorgi Beridze (on loan from Gent)
17	MF	NED	Guus Hupperts
19	MF	ROU	Vlad Mitrea

No.	Pos.	Nation	Player
21	DF	BEL	Jimmy De Jonghe
22	FW	ITA	Said Ahmed Said (on loan from Rio Ave)
26	DF	BEL	Arno Monsecour
28	MF	BEL	Amine Benchaib
29	MF	BEL	Bob Straetman
30	GK	BEL	Robin Mantel
33	GK	BEL	Théo Defourny
35	DF	BEL	Tracy Mpati
37	DF	BEL	Jelle Van Damme
41	DF	CGO	Francis N'Ganga
44	MF	BEL	Seth De Witte

== Notable players ==
The following is a provisional list of notable players who played for Lokeren, sorted by nationality.

- (Belgium) Aimé Anthuenis
- (Belgium) Radja Nainggolan
- (Belgium) Manuel Benson
- (Belgium) Davy De Beule
- (Belgium) Laurens De Bock
- (Belgium) Tjörven De Brul
- (Belgium) Bart De Roover
- (Belgium) Tom De Sutter
- (Belgium) Olivier Deschacht
- (Belgium) Johan Devrindt
- (Belgium) Filip De Wilde
- (Belgium) Olivier Doll
- (Belgium) Karel Geraerts
- (Belgium) Fernand Goyvaerts
- (Belgium) Marc Hendrikx
- (Belgium) Roger Henrotay
- (Belgium) Pier Janssen
- (Belgium) Armand Jurion
- (Belgium) Raymond Mommens
- (Belgium) Killian Overmeire
- (Belgium) Alex Querter
- (Belgium) Hans Vanaken
- (Belgium) Jelle Van Damme
- (Belgium) François Van der Elst
- (Belgium) Jan Van Steenberghe
- (Belgium) René Verheyen
- (Belgium) Bruno Versavel
- (Belgium) Daniel Veyt
- (Brazil) João Carlos
- (Brazil) Jajá
- (Burkina Faso) Aristide Bancé
- (Democratic Republic of the Congo) Elos Elonga-Ekakia
- (Democratic Republic of the Congo) Marcel Kimemba Mbayo
- (Democratic Republic of the Congo) Francis N'Ganga
- (Democratic Republic of the Congo) Patiyo Tambwe
- (Czech Republic) Jan Koller
- (Denmark) Kim Christofte
- (Denmark) Preben Elkjær
- (Finland) Marko Myyry
- (Finland) Antti Sumiala
- (Finland) Kari Ukkonen
- (France) Jérémy Perbet
- (Guinea) Souleymane Youla
- (Iceland) Marel Baldvinsson
- (Iceland) Alfreð Finnbogason
- (Iceland) Arnar Grétarsson
- (Iceland) Arnór Guðjohnsen
- (Iceland) Auðun Helgason
- (Iceland) Sverrir Ingi Ingason
- (Iceland) Rúnar Kristinsson
- (Iceland) Ari Freyr Skúlason
- (Iceland) Arnar Viðarsson
- (Iceland) Davíð Viðarsson
- (Israel) Omer Golan
- (Ivory Coast) Boubacar Barry
- (Ivory Coast) Patrice Zéré
- (Morocco) Mohamed Timoumi
- (Netherlands) Edward Linskens
- (Netherlands) Marcel Peeper
- (Netherlands) René van der Gijp
- (Niger) Moussa Maâzou
- (Nigeria) Cyriel Dessers
- (Nigeria) Stephen Keshi
- (Nigeria) Peter Rufai
- (Norway) Petter Rudi
- (Poland) Grzegorz Lato
- (Poland) Włodzimierz Lubański
- (Scotland) Jim Bett
- (Scotland) Jim Tolmie
- (South Africa) Ayanda Patosi
- (Sweden) Robin Söder
- (Syria) Sanharib Malki
- (Togo) Adékambi Olufadé
- (Zimbabwe) Knowledge Musona
- (Tunisia) Hamdi Harbaoui

== Managers ==
- (Belgium) Guy Thys (1 July 1958 – 30 June 1959)
- (Belgium) Frans De Bruyne (1970–71)
- (Belgium) Armand Jurion (1971–74)
- (Czechoslovakia) Ladislav Novák (1974–77)
- (Netherlands) Han Grijzenhout (1977–78)
- (Belgium) Leon Nollet (1978)
- (Belgium) Urbain Braems (1978–79)
- (Belgium) Urbain Haesaert & (Czechoslovakia) Josef Vacenovský (1979–81)
- (Belgium) Robert Waseige (1 July 1981–83)
- (Belgium) Dimitri Davidovic (1 July 1983 – 30 June 1985)
- (Belgium) Aimé Anthuenis (1985–87)
- (Netherlands) Wim Jansen & (Poland) Włodzimierz Lubański (1 July 1987–88)
- (Belgium) Aimé Anthuenis (1 July 1988–92)
- (Belgium) Aimé Anthuenis & (Czechoslovakia) Josef Vacenovský (1992 – Jan 93)
- (Belgium) Chris van Puyvelde (1993–94)
- (Belgium) Fi Van Hoof (1995 – Aug 97)
- (Belgium) Willy Reynders (1997 – Aug 99)
- (Belgium) R. Cossey & (Belgium) R. Van Geneugden (int.) (Aug 1999)
- (Belgium) Georges Leekens (Sept 10, 1999– 30 June 2001)
- (Belgium) Paul Put (1 July 2001 – 27 Oct 2003)
- (Belgium) Franky Van der Elst (27 Oct 2003 – 20 Dec 2004)
- (Serbia) Slavoljub Muslin (24 May 2005 – 31 Dec 2005)
- (Belgium) Aimé Anthuenis (1 Jan 2006 – 26 Feb 2006)
- (Belgium) Rudi Cossey (26 Feb 2006 – 30 June 2006)
- (Belgium) Ariël Jacobs (1 July 2006 – 29 Oct 2006)
- (Belgium) Rudi Cossey (interim) (Nov 2006)
- (Serbia) Slavoljub Muslin (26 Nov 2006 – 30 June 2007)
- (Belgium) Georges Leekens (1 July 2007 – 31 March 2009)
- (Belgium) Freddy Heirman (interim) (1 April 2009 – 7 April 2009)
- (Serbia) Aleksandar Janković (7 April 2009 – 25 Oct 2009)
- (Belgium) Jacky Mathijssen (25 Oct 2009 – 25 Jan 2010)
- (Belgium) Emilio Ferrera (28 Jan 2010 – 30 June 2010)
- (Belgium) Peter Maes (1 July 2010 – 30 June 2015)
- (Belgium) Bob Peeters (1 July 2015 – 25 Oct 2015)
- (Belgium) Georges Leekens (25 Oct 2015 – 25 Nov 2016)
- (Iceland) Rúnar Kristinsson (28 Oct 2016 – 9 Aug 2017)
- (Belgium) Peter Maes (9 Aug 2017 – 28 October 2018)
- (Norway) Trond Sollied (30 October 2018 – 20 January 2019)
- (Belgium) Glen De Boeck (20 January 2019 – 17 November 2019)
- (Belgium) Stijn Vreven (19 November 2019 – 20 April 2020)
