= Jerry Poorters =

Belgian footballer

Personal information
- Full name: Jerry Poorters
- Date of birth: 9 October 1978 (age 48)
- Place of birth: Lommel, Belgium
- Height: 1.83 m (6 ft 0 in)
- Position: Centre-back

Youth career
- 1983–1990: Wezel Sport
- 1990–1993: KFCV Geel
- 1993–1995: Lierse

Senior career*
Years	Team	Apps	(Gls)
1995–2002	Lierse	48	(0)
2002–2003	Tienen-Hageland	25	(2)
2003–2006	Waasland-Beveren	73	(6)
2006–2013	Rupel Boom	238	(36)
2013–2014	Beerschot Wilrijk	7	(0)
2014–2016	Wezel Sport		
Total		391	(44)
- * Club domestic league appearances and goals

Jerry Poorters (born 9 October 1978) is a Belgian former professional footballer who plays as a centre-back.

== Career ==
Before his time with K Rupel Boom FC, Poorters played for SK Lierse. With SK Lierse he won the Belgian First Division in 1997, the Belgian Cup in 1999 and the 1999 Belgian Super Cup. He even played Champions League football in 1997–1998.

After a short spell with Belgian Second Division club KVK Tienen, Poorters joined RS Waasland. Since 2006 he's playing for K Rupel Boom FC. With this club, Poorters achieved 2 promotions. In 2008 to the Belgian Third Division, and in 2010 to the Belgian Second Division. Poorters was the team captain for many years.

After the relegation of K Rupel Boom FC to the Belgian Third Division in 2011, Poorters signed a new contract until the end of the season 2013–2014.

After a series of bad results in the beginning of the 2013–2014 season, Poorters resigned from the club. He later signed a contract with Beerschot Wilrijk. After a few games however, his contract was cancelled with mutual consent.

Poorters ultimately signed a contract with Wezel Sport where he would end his career in 2016.

== Awards ==
- Supporters Player of the Year K. Rupel Boom: 2007, 2009, 2011
