= Arno Monsecour =

Belgian footballer

Personal information
- Date of birth: 19 January 1996 (age 30)
- Place of birth: Gent, Belgium
- Height: 1.76 m (5 ft 9 1/2 in)
- Position: Right-back

Youth career
- –2004: KFC Heusden
- 2004–2015: Sporting Lokeren

Senior career*
Years	Team	Apps	(Gls)
2015–2020	Sporting Lokeren	17	(0)
- * Club domestic league appearances and goals

Arno Monsecour (born 19 January 1996) is a Belgian footballer who played as a right-back.

== Club career ==
Arno started playing soccer at age five at KFC Heusden Sport and left at age eight for Sporting Lokeren. Monsecour played a number of years at Lokeren's academy. In May 2014, Monsecour signed a 3-year contract with Monsecour, with an option for one more year. He only made his official debut on 17 August 2017 when Monsecour replaced an injured Branislav Niňaj in the 86th minute, in a league match against K.V. Mechelen.

On 8 August 2014, Monsecour received his first call-up for Lokeren in the Belgian First Division A, however, without making his debut. He only made his official debut on 18 February 2017 when Monsecour replaced an injured Branislav Niňaj in the 86th minute, in a league match against K.V. Mechelen. Monsecour eventually played six league games in his debut season. In the 2017/18 season, he hit ten league games. Afterwards, however, he failed to break through further at Lokeren. However, in March 2018 he extended his contract until June 2021.

After Lokeren ended the 2018–19 season with relegation to the Belgian First Division B, Monsecour was relegated to the club's U23 team. Here he played one season before hanging up his boots.

== Life outside of football ==
Even during his active football career, he started his own practice as an independent dietician, and in 2021 he released the book “Delivered from Temptation.
