= Regi Van Acker =

Belgian football coach and former player

Personal information
- Date of birth: 25 April 1955 (age 71)
- Place of birth: Beveren, East Flanders, Belgium

Senior career*
Years	Team	Apps	(Gls)
- Excelsior Sint-Niklaas
- White Boys Sint-Niklaas
- RS Haasdonk
- Vrasene
- Sinaai

Managerial career
- Sinaai
- 1995–1998: Kortrijk
- 1998–2001: Antwerp
- 2001–2002: Lierse
- 2002–2005: Bregenz
- 2005–2006: Antwerp
- 2006–2007: Waasland
- 2007–2009: Racing Mechelen
- 2009–2011: Sint-Niklaas
- 2011–2014: Hoogstraten
- 2014: Hamme
- 2014–2015: Eendracht Aalst
- 2015–2016: Dessel Sport
- 2016–2019: Deinze
- 2020–2023: Dender
- 2023–2024: Eendracht Aalst
- 2024–: Schwarz-Weiß Bregenz
- * Club domestic league appearances and goals

Regi Van Acker (born 25 April 1955 in Beveren, Belgium) is a Belgian footballer and coach who is the manager of SW Bregenz.

He is known for his career as a football technician. He has coached KV Courtrai, Royal Antwerp F.C. twice, Casino SW Bregenz (Austrian Football Bundesliga), K Lierse SK and KV Red Star Waasland.

He won promotion with Dender in the 2021–22 season. In April 2024, he became the head coach of Austrian side Schwarz-Weiß Bregenz.
