= Peter Van Wambeke =

Belgian footballer (born 1963)

Personal information
- Date of birth: 19 April 1963 (age 63)
- Position: Midfielder

Senior career*
| Years | Team | Apps | (Gls) |
| 1980–1982 | Eendracht Zele | | |
| 1982–1987 | Sint-Niklaas | | |
| 1987–1990 | Germinal Ekeren | | |
| 1990–1992 | Boom | | |
| 1992–1996 | Eendracht Aalst | | |
| 1997 | Waregem | | |
| 1997–2000 | FC Denderleeuw | | |

Managerial career
- 2000–2001: Roeselare
- 2001–2003: Red Star Waasland
- 2004–2005: Gent-Zeehaven
- 2005: Sint-Niklaas
- 2006–2008: Temse
- 2008: VW Hamme
- 2009–2010: Ternat
- 2010: Rupel Boom
- 2011–?: Club Brugge (scout)
- * Club domestic league appearances and goals

Peter Van Wambeke (born 19 April 1963) is a Belgian former football player and manager who played as a midfielder.
