= Chris Van Puyvelde =

Belgian football coach

Personal information
- Full name: Chris Van Puyvelde
- Date of birth: 5 December 1959 (age 66)
- Place of birth: Sint-Niklaas, Belgium

Team information
- Current team: Morocco (technical director)

Managerial career
- Years: Team
- 1993–1994: Lokeren
- 1998: Eendracht Aalst
- 2000–2005: Club Brugge (assistant)
- 2005–2006: Olympiacos (assistant)
- 2007–2008: Gent (assistant)
- 2008–2009: Heerenveen (assistant)
- 2010: Lokeren (assistant)
- 2010–2011: FC Brussels
- 2015–2018: Belgium (technical director)
- 2019–2022: China (technical director)
- 2022–2025: Morocco (technical director)

Chris Van Puyvelde (born 5 December 1959), is a Belgian football manager who is currently the technical director of the Morocco national team.

== Career ==
Van Puyvelde was born in Sint-Niklaas and grew up in Waasmunster. He gained his first coaching experience at Standaard Wetteren, which he coached in the Third Division. Van Puyvelde, a sports teacher by training, then took a position at Gerda Sint-Niklaas, where he coordinated the youth ranks. In the early 1990s, Van Puyvelde moved to Lokeren as an assistant coach. The club had just been relegated to the Second Division when he was promoted to head coach. Van Puyvelde was eventually succeeded by James Storme during the 1994–95 season. After Lokeren he ended up at Eendracht Aalst. Van Puyvelde became a technical director and brought players such as Peter van der Heyden to Aalst. During the 1997–98 season, manager Urbain Haesaert was sacked, and Van Puyvelde succeeded him for a short period.

In 2000, Trond Sollied became the new manager of Club Brugge, bringing Van Puyvelde in as his second assistant. Van Puyvelde and the Sollied turned out to be a good match, and Club Brugge performed well. In 2002, Club Brugge won the Belgian Cup and the following season they won the Belgian First Division A title.

In 2005, Sollied announced that he was leaving the club, and he brought Van Puyvelde with him to his new position at Olympiacos. Sollied and Van Puyvelde propelled Olympiakos to the league title and Greek Football Cup. Sollied and Van Puyvelde were dismissed during the second season. In the summer of 2007 he moved to Gent together with Van Puyvelde and second assistant Čedomir Janevski. At the end of the season, Gent reached the final of the Belgian Cup, but were defeated. Sollied resigned and moved to SC Heerenveen. Van Puyvelde followed him again, and Heerenveen went through a changeable course, but reached the final of the KNVB Cup. In the final Heerenveen defeated opponent FC Twente after penalties. A few months later, Sollied's contract was terminated. Van Puyvelde also had to look for a new club. At the beginning of 2010, Van Puyvelde returned to Lokeren, where he became the assistant of coach Emilio Ferrera. However, after the end of the season, Ferrera was replaced by Peter Maes. Van Puyvelde himself then went to work as head coach of FC Brussels. After his resignation at FC Brussels at the end of January 2011, he succeeded Gunther Hofmans as technical director at Beerschot AC.

In 2013, Van Puyvelde was appointed as a sports advisor of the Belgian First Division A to lead the consultations between the professional football clubs in Belgium on a sports and technical level.

In 2019, he was appointed as technical director for China.
