= Frank Magerman =

Belgian footballer

Personal information
- Full name: Frank Magerman
- Date of birth: 9 November 1977 (age 48)
- Place of birth: Dendermonde, Belgium
- Position: Defensive midfielder

Team information
- Current team: K Beerschot VA (assistant)

Senior career*
Years	Team	Apps	(Gls)
1995–1998	Beveren	4	(0)
1998–1999	KSV Waregem	16	(2)
1999–2003	KV Oostende	92	(9)
2001–2002	→ Geel (loan)	19	(1)
2003–2005	Eendracht Aalst	58	(4)
2005–2007	RS Waasland	37	(3)
2007–2011	Rupel Boom	116	(5)
2011–2012	Standaard Wetteren	10	(0)
2012–2013	Berchem Sport		
2013–2014	KFCO Beerschot		

Managerial career
- 2014–2017: KFCO Beerschot II
- 2017: KFC Duffel
- 2018–2019: Hamme
- 2019–2020: Berchem Sport
- 2020–2021: K Beerschot VA (youth)
- 2021–: K Beerschot VA (assistant)
- * Club domestic league appearances and goals

Frank Magerman (born 9 November 1977 in Dendermonde) is a retired Belgian football midfielder and current assistant manager of K Beerschot VA.

== Career ==
Frank made his debut in Belgian football with then First Division team SK Beveren. After relegation in 1996 and promotion in 1997, he moved to now defunct K.S.V. Waregem in Belgian Second Division in 1998. After only one year he moved on to Belgian Second Division club K.V. Oostende.

After a loan spell with Verbroedering Geel in 2001 he joined Eendracht Aalst. After a two-year spell with RS Waasland he moved to then Fourth Division club K Rupel Boom FC.

After the season 2009–2010, Frank won The Golden Shoe, a price awarded to the best player of the season, chosen by the supports.

After the relegation back to Belgian Third Division, Frank signed a contract with Second Division side Standaard Wetteren. With this club he was also relegated to Third Division.

In June 2012, Magerman signed a two-year contract with newly promoted Third Division side Berchem Sport.

== Coaching career ==
Magerman played his last season as an active footballer at KFCO Beerschot and retired at the end of the 2013/14. He then became the manager of the club's reserve team. On 20 April 2017 the club announced, that Magerman after three seasons as manager, would leave the club at the end of the season and became the manager of KFC Duffel. On 23 December 2017 KFC Duffel announced, that Magerman had decided to resign because he didn't feel that he and the club was on the same wavelength.

In June 2018, he was appointed as manager of K.F.C. Vigor Wuitens Hamme. He was fired on 17 April 2019.

On 20 March 2019 Magerman returned to his former club, Berchem Sport, as the club's new manager. On 23 March 2020 it was confirmed that Magerman was done with the club after the season.

In April 2020, it was confirmed that Magerman returned to his former club, K Beerschot VA, in a coaching position at the club's academy. On 21 September 2021 Magerman was promoted to the first team staff as assistant coach to the club's new manager, Javier Torrente.
