= Michel Wintacq =

Belgian footballer

Personal information
- Full name: Michel Wintacq
- Date of birth: 2 October 1955 (age 71)
- Place of birth: Belgium
- Position: Defender

Senior career*
Years	Team	Apps	(Gls)
1974–1979	RAA La Louviére	?	(?)
1979–1983	RFC de Liège	?	(?)
1983–1988	Standard Liège	124	(8)

International career^{‡}
1983	Belgium	1	(0)

Managerial career
- 2010: RBDB
- 2011: R.F.C. Tournai
- * Club domestic league appearances and goals as of 16 October 2009 ‡ National team caps and goals as of 16 October 2009

Michel Wintacq (born 2 October 1955) is a Belgian former footballer who played as a defender. Following his retirement, Wintacq has had roles as a football coach.

During his club career, Wintacq played for RAA La Louviére, RFC de Liège and Standard Liège. He played once for the Belgium national team.

After retirement, he took interim positions at Mons and was trainer at Boussu Dour, before joining Tournai in 2011.
