= Nico Vanderdonck =

Belgian footballer

Personal information
- Date of birth: 6 December 1969 (age 56)
- Height: 1.71 m (5 ft 7 in)
- Position: Midfielder

Senior career*
Years	Team	Apps	(Gls)
1986–1990	Harelbeke		
1990–1995	Deinze		
1995–1997	Gent	49	(1)
1997–1998	Roeselare		
1998–2002	Ingelmunster		
2001	→ Ronse (loan)		
2002–2003	Deinze		
2003–2005	Verbroedering Denderhoutem		
2005–2008	Torhout		

Managerial career
- 2008–2010: Roeselare (assistant)
- 2010–2011: Roeselare
- 2012: Deinze
- 2013–2016: Gent (U19)
- * Club domestic league appearances and goals

Nico Vanderdonck (born 6 December 1969) is a Belgian former football player and manager.
