= Thierry Pister =

Belgian footballer

Personal information
- Date of birth: 2 September 1965 (age 61)
- Place of birth: Ghent, Belgium
- Height: 1.79 m (5 ft 10 in)
- Position: Midfielder

Youth career
- 1974–1982: AA Gent

Senior career*
Years	Team	Apps	(Gls)
1982–1986	Gent		
1986–1989	Antwerp	92	(12)
1989–1990	Toulon	24	(1)
1990–1994	Standard Liège	81	(4)
1994	Gent	13	(0)
1994–1997	Lausanne	57	(2)
1997–1998	Beveren	24	(1)

Managerial career
- 1998–2001: Mons
- 2001–2002: Beveren
- 2002–2004: Mons
- 2004–2005: Ronse
- 2005: AC Allianssi
- 2007: RFC Tournai
- 2008: Mons (assistant)
- 2008: Mons
- 2009–2011: KV Oostende
- 2011–2012: UR La Louvière
- 2012: Charleroi-Marchienne
- 2012–2015: RC Mechelen
- 2015–2016: FCV Dender EH
- 2016–2017: RFC Tournai
- 2017–2019: Guinea
- 2019–2020: Olympic Charleroi
- * Club domestic league appearances and goals

Thierry Pister (born 2 September 1965 in Belgium) is a former Belgian footballer and manager.

In 2005, when managing AC Allianssi, he was implicated in a match-fixing scandal involving Chinese business executive Zheyun Ye.

== Honours ==
Standard Liège

- Belgian Cup: 1992–93
