= Patrick Asselman =

Belgian footballer (born 1968)

Personal information
- Date of birth: 30 October 1968 (age 57)
- Place of birth: Belgium
- Position: Midfielder

Senior career*
Years	Team	Apps	(Gls)
1988–1990	KRC Mechelen		
1990–1994	Standard Liège		
1994–1995	KV Mechelen		
1995–1996	Denderleeuw		
1996–1999	Marítimo		
2000–2002	Denderleeuw		

Managerial career
- 2004: Bornem
- 2005–2006: KRC Mechelen
- 2006–2009: Dender EH (assistant)
- 2009–2010: Dender EH
- 2010: Tournai
- 2011–2015: Appelterre-Eichem
- 2015–2017: OH Leuven (assistant)
- 2017–: Anderlecht (assistant)
- * Club domestic league appearances and goals

Patrick Asselman (born 30 October 1968) is a Belgian former football player and currently assistant coach of Anderlecht in the Belgian Pro League.

== Honours ==
Standard Liège

- Belgian Cup: 1992–93
