= Colin Andrews =

British electrical engineer and crop circle researcher (born 1946)

- Born: March 1946 (age 80); Great Britain
- Education: Eastleigh College
- Occupations: Researcher, Author
- Known for: Crop circle and consciousness research, UFO studies
- Website: https://www.colinandrews.net/

Colin Andrews (born March 1946) is a British electrical engineer and researcher who has studied crop circles and related unexplained phenomena since the early 1980s. He co-founded an organization focused on crop circle research in 1984, and has written books and made media appearances on the subject.

== Early life and career ==
Colin Andrews is a British electrical engineer who became involved in the study of crop circles in the early 1980s. In 1983, he reported observing an unexplained crop formation in Hampshire. The following year, he joined with other researchers to establish a group known as Circles Phenomenon Research (CPR) to document and examine crop circle reports. Early work by the group included collecting field data and collaborating with individuals such as Pat Delgado and Busty Taylor.

Andrews has also written about consciousness and altered states of mind.

== Research into crop circles ==
Andrews' interest in crop circles began in the early 1980s, when he observed a complex formation resembling a Celtic Cross in a wheat field near Cheesefoot Head, Hampshire. This observation marked the start of his investigation into crop circles, patterns created by flattened crops that had been reported sporadically for decades but became widely publicized during the 1980s.

In 1989, Andrews co-authored Circular Evidence with Pat Delgado, which presented their research on crop formations. According to a 2009 article in The Guardian, both Queen Elizabeth II and the Duke of Edinburgh expressed interest in crop circles, with the Duke reportedly subscribing to a newsletter authored by Andrews.

== Scientific and public reception ==
The crop circle phenomenon has been met with skepticism in the broader scientific community. Notably, in 1991, Doug Bower and Dave Chorley admitted to creating many crop circles as hoaxes using simple tools, casting doubt on claims of non-human origin. In 2002, Andrews related the result of a two-year investigation into hoaxing, estimating that about 80% of crop circles are human-made. He maintains that the remaining formations could not be fully explained by hoaxers alone, nor can the reports of associated anomalies.

== Bibliography ==
- Circular Evidence (1994) co-authored with Pat Delgado
- Crop Circles: The Latest Evidence (1991) co-authored with Pat Delgado
- Crop Circles: Signs of Contact (2003) co-written with Steve Spignesi
- Government Circles' (2009)
- The Complete Idiot's Guide to 2012 (2008) co-authored with Synthia Andrews
- The Complete Idiot's Guide to the Akashic Record (2010) co-authored with Synthia Andrews
- The Assessment: 2011 Special Edition
- The Andrews Catalog: 2011 Special Edition
- On the Edge of Reality (2013) co-authored with Synthia Andrews
