= AC Allianssi =

Finnish football club

- Full name: AC Vantaan Allianssi
- Founded: 2002; 24 years ago
- Dissolved: 2006; 20 years ago
- Ground: Pohjola Stadion; Vantaa
- Capacity: 4,700
- 2005: Veikkausliiga, 7th
Home colours	Away colours

AC Vantaan Allianssi (or AC Allianssi) was a Finnish football club, based in the town of Vantaa.

== History ==
Allianssi were a club in decline, following an 8–0 defeat at fellow Finnish club FC Haka. The match was believed to have been fixed by a Belgian-Chinese betting cartel, which took control of the club in summer 2005. A subsequent police investigation failed to find sufficient evidence of match fixing though. In 2006, a former managing director, Olivier Suray, admitted that the notorious match was fixed. However, he accused Chinese owner Ye Zheyun of fixing.

On 11 April 2006, club chairman Erkki Salo announced that the club would be filing for bankruptcy with immediate effect.

=== Domestic history ===
Season	League									Finnish Cup	Finnish League Cup	Top goalscorer		Manager
Season	Div.	Pos.	Pl.	W	D	L	GS	GA	P	Finnish Cup	Finnish League Cup	Name	League	Manager
2002	1st	4th	29	12	5	12	39	44	41	Semi Final	-	Petteri Kaijasilta	13	(Finland) Ari Tiittanen
2003	1st	6th	26	10	6	10	43	44	36	Runners Up	-			(Finland) Ari Tiittanen
2004	1st	2nd	26	14	6	6	36	28	48	Quarter Final	Winners			(Finland) Ari Tiittanen
2005	1st	7th	26	8	10	8	33	41	34		Winners			(Finland) Ari Tiittanen / (Belgium) Thierry Pister

=== European history ===
Season	Competition	Round	Club	Home	Away	Aggregate
2003	UEFA Intertoto Cup	First round	(Malta) Hibernians	1–0	1–1	2–1
2003	UEFA Intertoto Cup	Second round	(Greece) Akratitos	0–0	1–0	1–0
2003	UEFA Intertoto Cup	Third round	(Italy) AC Perugia	0–2	0–2	0–4
2004–05	UEFA Cup	First qualifying round	(Northern Ireland) Glentoran	1–2	2–2	3–4
2005–06	UEFA Cup	First qualifying round	(Luxembourg) CS Pétange	3–0	1–1	4–1
2005–06	UEFA Cup	Second qualifying round	(Norway) Brann	0–2	0–0	0–2

== Honours ==
- Finnish League Cup (2): 2004, 2005
