= RAEC Mons (1910) =

Former Belgian football club

- Full name: Royal Albert Élisabeth Club de Mons
- Nicknames: Les Dragons (The Dragons); L'Albert (The Albert)
- Founded: 11 April 1910; 116 years ago
- Dissolved: 26 May 2015; 11 years ago
- Ground: Stade Charles Tondreau, Mons, Hainaut Province
- Capacity: 8,000
- Final season; 2014–15: 7th (Relegated from Belgian Second Division)

Royal Albert Élisabeth Club de Mons, commonly known as RAEC Mons or simply Mons, was a Belgian football club based in Mons, Hainaut. Founded in 1910, the club played its home matches at Stade Charles Tondreau throughout its existence. Known as l'Albert and nicknamed the Dragons—after the city's Ducasse de Mons (the Doudou)—Mons spent much of its history in the second and third tiers of Belgian football.

Mons first reached the top flight in 2002 and would have three spells in the first division before suffering relegation in 2014. Financial problems led the club to file for bankruptcy; on 31 March 2015 it was placed into liquidation and ceased operations at the end of the 2014–15 season, which it finished seventh in the second tier.

In 2020, a successor club was launched by local stakeholders under the name Renaissance Mons 44; it later adopted the historic name RAEC Mons.

== History ==
=== Early years ===
There were originally several association football clubs in Mons. Club Amateur Sportif was founded in 1905 as a member of the UBSSA (Union Belge des Sociétés de Sports Athlétiques), with the club colors being red and white. This club later changed its name to Cercle des Sport de Mons and settled on Avenue du Tir. Another club was Stade Montois with the colors blue and white. This club merged in May 1910 with Cercle des Sports de Mons, Nimy-Sportif and Olympique de Mons and continued as Olympique Mons. There was also Racing Club Mons. In 1913, Racing Club Mons merged with Olympic Mons.

In 1909, René Tondreau, Maurice Van Pel, Henri Lebailly and Fernand Courtois decided to form a new club. Following the example of Léopold Club de Bruxelles, they also wanted to take the name of the reigning Belgian monarch. The admission to the name Albert-Elisabeth Club de Mons, which referred to the marriage of Albert I of Belgium and Elisabeth of Bavaria, Queen of Belgium, was requested from King Albert I, and was officially given on 18 May 1910 by letter from the Royal Palace. The club became a member of the Royal Belgian Football Association (KBVB) on 17 June 1910 and received matricule number 44. In May 1910, the lease was signed for one hectare of land along Avenue du Tir, on the site of the current stadium, and on 25 September 1910, it was opened in front of 300 spectators. The new club played in the blue and white colours of the royal family until September 1920, which then became red and white, the colours of the city of Mons.

=== RAEC Mons ===
After World War I, in 1919, Mons appeared for the first time in Belgian Second Division, but suffered relegation again after two seasons. In 1923, AEC Mons and FC Baudoir merged. Eventually the name changed in 1934 to Royal Albert Elisabeth Club Mons or RAEC Mons. During the following decades, the club mainly competed in the second and third tiers of Belgian football. In 1988, the club Royale Union Jemappes-Flénu (matricule number 136) was merged into Mons. The RAEC name and matricule number were retained.

However, around the turn of the millennium, the club succeeded in making a rise through the divisions. In 2000, Mons finished at the top of their series in the Third Division, with as many points as Heusden-Zolder. The decisive play-off match between the two clubs ended 3–3, with Mons promoting back to the Second Division after winning 4–3 in the subsequent penalty shootout. In the Second Division, Mons immediately managed to qualify for the final play-off round in their first season, but eventually failed to promote again. The following season, 2001–02, was a major success. Mons qualified for the final play-off round again, won, and thus promoted to the Belgian top-tier First Division for the first time in club history in 2002. Mons relegated again in 2005, but bounced back after one season down.

Philippe Saint-Jean was hired as the new head coach for the 2008–09 season. He resigned after one match-day for medical reasons and was succeeded by Thierry Pister. In December 2008, Pister was fired after poor results and succeeded by youth coach Christophe Dessy, who was also immediately promoted to the role of manager. At the end of that season, they again relegated to the Second Division. Dessy stepped down and Rudi Cossey became head coach, until his resignation in November 2009. Successor Geert Broeckaert was later also replaced. Dutchman Dennis van Wijk took over and guided Mons to the First Division again in 2011 via the final play-off round. In February 2012, Van Wijk was dismissed again after he himself had announced that he did not want to renew his contract. Enzo Scifo was appointed as new head coach and guided the club to the semi-finals of the play-offs in the remaining games.

In the 2013–14 season, RAEC Mons was heading for relegation play-offs the entire season, and eventually finished last in the league table. In the subsequent play-offs, the club relegated to the Second Division again.

=== Bankruptcy and rebirth ===
On 23 June 2020, the president of Royal Albert Quevy-Mons Hubert Ewbank launched the project for the renaissance of current RAEC Mons and announced that the name of the club would be changed to the Renaissance Albert Élisabeth Club de Mons 44 and he also announced that Frédéric Herpoel becomes the sports president of the club.

== Honours ==
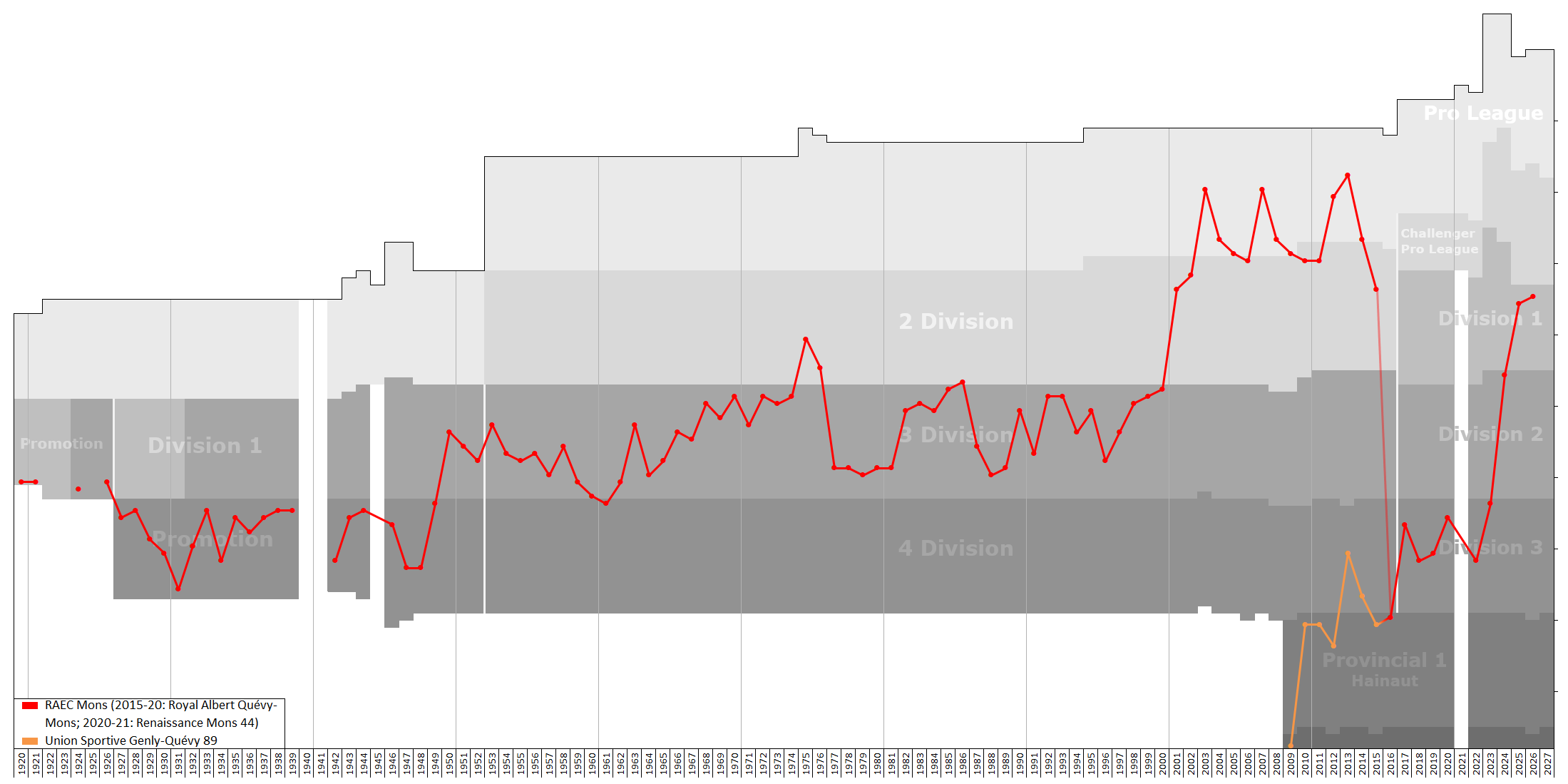
Historical chart of RAEC Mons league performance

- Belgian Second Division:
  - Winners (1): 2005–06
- Belgian Second Division final round:
  - Winners (1): 2001–02, 2010–11
- Belgian Third Division:
  - Winners (3): 1948–49, 1984–85 (A); 1999–2000 (B)
- Belgian Fourth Division:
  - Winners (1): 1960–61

== Former coaches ==
- (Belgium) Jules Henriet (1956–1959)
- (Belgium) Pieter Van Den Bosch (1960–1962)
- (Belgium) Pierre Hanon (1973–1975)
- (Belgium) Thierry Pister (30 June 2000 – 30 November 2001)
- (Belgium) Michel Wintacq (2002 – April 2002)
- (Belgium) Marc Grosjean (April 2002 – 31 August 2003)
- (Italy) Sergio Brio (2003 – 5 October 2004)
- (Belgium) Michel Wintacq (interim) (5 October 2004 – 11 October 2004)
- (Belgium) Jos Daerden (11 October 2004 – 25 April 2005)
- (Belgium) Michel Wintacq (interim) (25 April 2005 – 6 June 2005)
- (Belgium) José Riga (6 June 2005 – 28 January 2008)
- (France) Albert Cartier (28 January 2008 – 30 June 2008)
- (Belgium) Phillipe Saint-Jean (1 July 2008 – 21 August 2008)
- (Belgium) Thierry Pister (21 August 2008 – 4 December 2008)
- (Belgium) Rudi Cossey (Interim) (2008)
- (Belgium) Christophe Dessy (4 December 2008 – 30 June 2009)
- (Belgium) Rudi Cossey (Interim) (1 July 2009 – 23 November 2009)
- (Belgium) Geert Broeckaert (1 July 2009 – 24 January 2011)
- (Netherlands) Dennis Van Wijk (25 January 2011 – 27 February 2012)
- (Belgium) Enzo Scifo (28 February 2012 – 26 September 2013)
- (North Macedonia) Čedomir Janevski (27 September 2013 – 2014)
- (Belgium) Didier Beugnies (2014–2015)
