= 1976–77 UEFA Cup =

6th season of Europe's secondary club football tournament organised by UEFA

Tournament details
- Dates: 8 September 1976 – 18 May 1977
- Teams: 64

Final positions
- Champions: (Italy) Juventus (1st title)
- Runners-up: (Spain) Athletic Bilbao

Tournament statistics
- Matches played: 126
- Goals scored: 399 (3.17 per match)
- Attendance: 2,810,845 (22,308 per match)
- Top scorer(s): Stan Bowles (Queens Park Rangers); 11 goals

The 1976–77 UEFA Cup was the sixth season of the UEFA Cup, the third-tier club football competition organised by UEFA. The final was played over two legs at Stadio Comunale, Turin, Italy, and at San Mamés, Bilbao, Spain. It was won by Juventus of Italy, who defeated Athletic Bilbao of Spain on the away goals rule after a 2–2 aggregate draw to claim their first UEFA Cup title.

This was the first major European conquest for Juventus, having previously lost one European Cup final and two Inter-Cities Fairs' Cup finals. It was the first time that a team from Southern Europe had won the competition, and the last European title for an Italian team for seven years, which was their biggest international drought at club level until 2018.

In their first European final, Athletic Bilbao was the first Spanish finalist in the UEFA Cup, and the only one until 1985. A Spanish club last reached the Inter-Cities Fairs' Cup final in 1966, which was also the last year with a Spanish title in Europe. Athletic became the fourth different Spanish side to lose at this stage in European competition ever since.

== Association team allocation ==
A total of 64 teams from 31 UEFA member associations participate in the 1976–77 UEFA Cup. The original allocation scheme was as follows:

- 3 associations have four teams qualify.
- 3 associations have three teams qualify.
- 18 associations have two teams qualify.
- 7 associations have one team qualify.

Hungary and Romania were the two associations selected to have an extra third birth for this season, while the Soviet Union and Sweden went back to two qualified teams.

Associations in the 1976–77 UEFA Cup

Four teams
England
West Germany
Italy
Three teams
Spain
Hungary
Romania

Two teams
Netherlands	East Germany	Soviet Union
(Socialist Federal Republic of Yugoslavia) Yugoslavia	Scotland	Portugal
Czechoslovakia	Belgium	Poland
Greece	France	Bulgaria
Sweden	Switzerland	Austria
Turkey	Denmark	Norway

One team
(Republic of Ireland) Republic of Ireland
(Northern Ireland) Northern Ireland
Malta
Finland
Iceland
Cyprus
Luxembourg

Did not compete
Wales
Albania

Wales: There was no national league in Wales before 1992 and the only competition organised by the Football Association of Wales was the Welsh Cup so Wales had just a single participant in European competitions, the winner (or best placed Welsh team as several English teams also competed) of the Welsh Cup which competed in the UEFA Cup Winners' Cup.
Albania: Albanian teams were absent from European competition from 1973 to 1978 due to the international isolation of the country during the communist rule of Enver Hoxha. Vllaznia would have qualified for the UEFA Cup by league position.

=== Teams ===
The labels in the parentheses show how each team qualified for competition:

- TH: Title holders
- CW: Cup winners
- CR: Cup runners-up
- LC: League Cup winners
- 2nd, 3rd, 4th, 5th, 6th, etc.: League position
- P-W: End-of-season European competition play-offs winners

Qualified teams for 1976–77 UEFA Cup
(England) Queens Park Rangers (2nd)	(England) Manchester United (3rd)	(England) Derby County (4th)	(England) Manchester City (LC)
(West Germany) Köln (4th)	(West Germany) Eintracht Braunschweig (5th)	(West Germany) Schalke 04 (6th)	(West Germany) Kaiserslautern (7th)
(Italy) Juventus (2nd)	(Italy) Milan (3rd)	(Italy) Inter Milan (4th)	(Italy) Cesena (6th)
(Spain) Barcelona (2nd)	(Spain) Español (4th)	(Spain) Athletic Bilbao (5th)	(Hungary) Videoton (2nd)
(Hungary) Újpest Dosza (3rd)	(Hungary) Budapest Honvéd (4th)	(Romania) Dinamo București (2nd)	(Romania) Târgu Mureș (3rd)
(Romania) Sportul Studențesc (4th)	(Netherlands) Feyenoord (2nd)	(Netherlands) Ajax (3rd)	(East Germany) BFC Dynamo (2nd)
(East Germany) Magdeburg (3rd)	(Soviet Union) Shakhtar Donetsk (2nd)	(Soviet Union) Dynamo Moscow (3rd)	(Socialist Federal Republic of Yugoslavia) Dinamo Zagreb (3rd)
(Socialist Federal Republic of Yugoslavia) Red Star Belgrade (4th)	(Scotland) Celtic (2nd)	(Scotland) Hibernian (3rd)	(Portugal) Belenenses (3rd)
(Portugal) Porto (4th)	(Czechoslovakia) Slovan Bratislava (2nd)	(Czechoslovakia) Slavia Prague (3rd)	(Belgium) Molenbeek (3rd)
(Belgium) Lokeren (4th)	(Poland) Tychy (2nd)	(Poland) Wisła Kraków (3rd)	(Greece) AEK Athens (2nd)
(Greece) Olympiacos (3rd)	(France) Nice (2nd)	(France) Sochaux (3rd)	(Bulgaria) Akademik Sofia (3rd)
(Bulgaria) Lokomotiv Plovdiv (4th)	(Sweden) Öster (2nd)	(Sweden) Djurgården (3rd)	(Switzerland) Basel (3rd)
(Switzerland) Grasshoppers (4th)	(Austria) Wacker Innsbruck (2nd)	Austria Salzburg (4th)	(Turkey) Fenerbahçe (2nd)
(Turkey) Adanaspor (4th)	(Denmark) Holbæk (2nd)	(Denmark) Næstved (3rd)	(Norway) Brann (2nd)
(Norway) IK Start (3rd)	(Republic of Ireland) Finn Harps (2nd)	(Northern Ireland) Glentoran (2nd)	(Malta) Hibernians (3rd)
(Finland) KuPS Kuopio (2nd)	(Iceland) Fram (2nd)	(Cyprus) Enosis Neon Paralimni (3rd)	(Luxembourg) Red Boys Differdange (2nd)

== Schedule ==
The schedule of the competition was as follows. Matches were scheduled for Wednesdays, though some matches took place on Tuesdays or Thursdays.

Schedule for 1976–77 UEFA Cup
Round	First leg	Second leg
First round	8–16 September 1976	28–30 September 1976
Second round	20 October 1976	3–4 November 1976
Third round	24 November 1976	7–8 December 1976
Quarter-finals	2–3 March 1977	16 March 1977
Semi-finals	6 April 1977	20 April 1977
Final	4 May 1977	18 May 1977

== First round ==
Team 1	Agg.	Team 2	1st leg	2nd leg
Porto (Portugal)	4–5	(West Germany) Schalke 04	2–2	2–3
Fram (Iceland)	0–8	(Czechoslovakia) Slovan Bratislava	0–3	0–5
Glentoran (Northern Ireland)	3–5	(Switzerland) Basel	3–2	0–3
Enosis Neon Paralimni (Cyprus)	1–11	(West Germany) Kaiserslautern	1–3	0–8
AEK Athens (Greece)	3–2	(Soviet Union) Dynamo Moscow	2–0	1–2 (a.e.t.)
Ajax (Netherlands)	1–2	(England) Manchester United	1–0	0–2
Austria Salzburg	5–2	(Turkey) Adanaspor	5–0	0–2
Belenenses (Portugal)	4–5	(Spain) Barcelona	2–2	2–3
Celtic (Scotland)	2–4	(Poland) Wisła Kraków	2–2	0–2
Derby County (England)	16–1	(Republic of Ireland) Finn Harps	12–0	4–1
Dinamo București (Romania)	1–2	(Italy) Milan	0–0	1–2
Eintracht Braunschweig (West Germany)	7–1	(Denmark) Holbæk	7–0	0–1
Espanyol (Spain)	4–3	(France) Nice	3–1	1–2
Feyenoord (Netherlands)	4–2	(Sweden) Djurgården	3–0	1–2
Fenerbahçe (Turkey)	2–5	(Hungary) Videoton	2–1	0–4
Grasshoppers (Switzerland)	9–0	(Malta) Hibernians	7–0	2–0
Hibernian (Scotland)	1–0	(France) Sochaux	1–0	0–0
Inter Milan (Italy)	1–2	(Hungary) Budapest Honvéd	0–1	1–1
Köln (West Germany)	3–1	(Poland) Tychy	2–0	1–1
KuPS (Finland)	3–4	(Sweden) Öster	3–2	0–2
Magdeburg (East Germany)	4–3	(Italy) Cesena	3–0	1–3
Manchester City (England)	1–2	(Italy) Juventus	1–0	0–2
Næstved (Denmark)	0–7	(Belgium) Molenbeek	0–3	0–4
Queens Park Rangers (England)	11–0	(Norway) Brann	4–0	7–0
Red Boys Differdange (Luxembourg)	1–6	(Belgium) Lokeren	0–3	1–3
Slavia Prague (Czechoslovakia)	2–3	(Bulgaria) Akademik Sofia	2–0	0–3 (a.e.t.)
Shakhtar Donetsk (Soviet Union)	4–1	(East Germany) BFC Dynamo	3–0	1–1
Sportul Studențesc (Romania)	4–2	(Greece) Olympiacos	3–0	1–2
Wacker Innsbruck (Austria)	7–1	(Norway) Start	2–1	5–0
Târgu Mureș (Romania)	0–4	(Socialist Federal Republic of Yugoslavia) Dinamo Zagreb	0–1	0–3
Újpest (Hungary)	1–5	(Spain) Athletic Bilbao	1–0	0–5
Lokomotiv Plovdiv (Bulgaria)	3–5	(Socialist Federal Republic of Yugoslavia) Red Star Belgrade	2–1	1–4

=== First leg ===
8 September 1976

Porto (Portugal)	2–2	(West Germany) Schalke 04
Reis 47'; Cubillas 66'	Report	Fischer 37', 44'

Estádio da Luz, Lisbon
Attendance: 33,000
Referee: William Gow (Wales)

14 September 1976

Fram (Iceland)	0–3	(Czechoslovakia) Slovan Bratislava
	Report	Haraslín 10', 39'; Mrva 61'

Laugardalsvöllur, Reykjavík
Attendance: 2,155
Referee: Eamonn Farrell (Republic of Ireland)

14 September 1976
17:00

Glentoran (Northern Ireland)	3–2	(Switzerland) Basel
Feeney 12', 42'; Dickenson 51'	Report	Maissen 26'; Ramseier 73'

The Oval, Belfast
Attendance: 3,000
Referee: Rolf Eriksson (Sweden)

14 September 1976

Enosis Neon Paralimni (Cyprus)	1–3	(West Germany) Kaiserslautern
Mertakas 80'	Report	Riedl 39'; Meier 47'; Stickel 86'

Paralimni Municipal Stadium, Paralimni
Attendance: 1,200
Referee: Atanas Mateev (Bulgaria)

15 September 1976

AEK Athens (Greece)	2–0	(Soviet Union) Dynamo Moscow
Nikoloudis 32'; Papaioannou 51'	Report

AEK Stadium, Nea Filadelfeia
Attendance: 26,151
Referee: Marijan Raus (Yugoslavia)

15 September 1976

Ajax (Netherlands)	1–0	(England) Manchester United
Krol 42'	Report

Olympic Stadium, Amsterdam
Attendance: 22,000
Referee: Paul Schiller (Austria)

15 September 1976

Austria Salzburg	5–0	(Turkey) Adanaspor
Schwarz 2', 37' (pen.), 61'; Haider 58', 81'	Report

Stadion Lehen, Salzburg
Attendance: 11,000
Referee: Jerzy Świstek (Poland)

15 September 1976

Belenenses (Portugal)	2–2	(Spain) Barcelona
Quaresma 30'; Horta 56'	Report	Heredia 15', 85'

Estádio do Restelo, Lisbon
Attendance: 35,000
Referee: John Gordon (Scotland)

15 September 1976

Celtic (Scotland)	2–2	(Poland) Wisła Kraków
MacDonald 13'; Dalglish 89'	Report	Kmiecik 67'; Wróbel 74'

Celtic Park, Glasgow
Attendance: 30,000
Referee: César Correia (Portugal)

15 September 1976

Derby County (England)	12–0	(Republic of Ireland) Finn Harps
Hector 6', 22', 37', 39', 65'; Rioch 12'; James 20', 30', 70'; George 24', 29', 76'	Report

Baseball Ground, Derby
Attendance: 13,353
Referee: Antoine Queudeville (Luxembourg)

15 September 1976

Dinamo București (Romania)	0–0	(Italy) Milan
	Report

Stadionul Dinamo, Bucharest
Attendance: 20,000
Referee: Klaus Ohmsen (West Germany)

15 September 1976

Eintracht Braunschweig (West Germany)	7–0	(Denmark) Holbæk
Hollmann 7'; Stolzenburg 37', 89'; Frank 49', 77', 79'; Gersdorff 55'	Report

Eintracht-Stadion, Braunschweig
Attendance: 10,793
Referee: Sándor Petri (Hungary)

15 September 1976

Espanyol (Spain)	3–1	(France) Nice
Cuesta 11'; Marañón 66'; Caszely 73'	Report	Toko 19'

Sarrià Stadium, Barcelona
Attendance: 25,000
Referee: Hilmi Ok (Turkey)

15 September 1976

Feyenoord (Netherlands)	3–0	(Sweden) Djurgården
Schneider 10' (pen.); Kreuz 82'; Vreijsen 84'	Report

De Kuip, Rotterdam
Attendance: 8,452
Referee: Francisco Lobo (Portugal)

15 September 1976

Fenerbahçe (Turkey)	2–1	(Hungary) Videoton
Turan 19', 87'	Report	Nagy II 70'

İnönü Stadium, Istanbul
Attendance: 31,266
Referee: Yuri Sergienko (Soviet Union)

15 September 1976

Grasshoppers (Switzerland)	7–0	(Malta) Hibernians
Bosco 3'; Seiler 8', 18', 31'; Bauer 46'; Cornioley 57' (pen.), 86'	Report

Hardturm, Zürich
Attendance: 1,800
Referee: René Vigliani (France)

15 September 1976

Hibernian (Scotland)	1–0	(France) Sochaux
Brownlie 35'	Report

Easter Road, Edinburgh
Attendance: 9,454
Referee: Wolfgang Riedel (East Germany)

15 September 1976

Inter Milan (Italy)	0–1	(Hungary) Budapest Honvéd
	Report	Fehérvári 32'

San Siro, Milan
Attendance: 35,000
Referee: Charles Corver (Netherlands)

15 September 1976

Köln (West Germany)	2–0	(Poland) Tychy
Flohe 42' (pen.); Van Gool 88'	Report

Müngersdorfer Stadion, Cologne
Attendance: 19,000
Referee: Torben Månsson (Denmark)

15 September 1976

KuPS (Finland)	3–2	(Sweden) Öster
Törnroos 75'; Rissanen 79', 85'	Report	Strömberg 41'; Ejderstedt 51'

Väinölänniemen stadion, Kuopio
Attendance: 1,280
Referee: Adolf Prokop (East Germany)

15 September 1976

Magdeburg (East Germany)	3–0	(Italy) Cesena
Steinbach 26'; Streich 40' (pen.), 87'	Report

Ernst Grube Stadium, Magdeburg
Attendance: 28,000
Referee: Pablo Sánchez Ibáñez (Spain)

15 September 1976

Manchester City (England)	1–0	(Italy) Juventus
Kidd 44'	Report

Maine Road, Manchester
Attendance: 36,955
Referee: Walter Hungerbühler (Switzerland)

15 September 1976

Næstved (Denmark)	0–3	(Belgium) Molenbeek
	Report	Boskamp 41'; Wellens 85', 87'

Næstved Stadium, Næstved
Attendance: 6,367
Referee: Henry Øberg (Norway)

15 September 1976

Queens Park Rangers (England)	4–0	(Norway) Brann
Bowles 29', 34', 64'; Masson 85'	Report

Loftus Road, London
Attendance: 14,698
Referee: Guðjón Finnbogason (Iceland)

15 September 1976

Red Boys Differdange (Luxembourg)	0–3	(Belgium) Lokeren
	Report	Verheyen 13', 26'; Dalving 69'

Stade du Thillenberg, Differdange
Attendance: 3,200
Referee: Paul Kindervater (West Germany)

15 September 1976

Slavia Prague (Czechoslovakia)	2–0	(Bulgaria) Akademik Sofia
Herda 47'; Radolský 65'	Report

Stadion Eden, Prague
Attendance: 4,521
Referee: Velibor Ljujić (Yugoslavia)

15 September 1976
19:00

Shakhtar Donetsk (Soviet Union)	3–0	(East Germany) BFC Dynamo
Rohovsky 3'; Sokolovsky 75'; Starukhin 80'	Report

Shakhtar Stadium, Donetsk
Attendance: 19,500
Referee: Dimitar Parmakov (Bulgaria)

15 September 1976

Sportul Studențesc (Romania)	3–0	(Greece) Olympiacos
Grosu 38'; Ionescu 75', 81'	Report

Stadionul 23 August, Bucharest
Attendance: 12,000
Referee: André Favre (Switzerland)

15 September 1976

Wacker Innsbruck (Austria)	2–1	(Norway) Start
Stering 8'; Pezzey 76'	Report	Mathisen 67' (pen.)

Tivoli Old, Innsbruck
Attendance: 9,000
Referee: Jacques Colling (Luxembourg)

15 September 1976

Târgu Mureș (Romania)	0–1	(Socialist Federal Republic of Yugoslavia) Dinamo Zagreb
	Report	Jurišić 64'

Stadionul Muncitoresc, Târgu Mureș
Attendance: 16,000
Referee: Petros Marinos (Greece)

15 September 1976

Újpest (Hungary)	1–0	(Spain) Athletic Bilbao
A. Dunai 89'	Report

Szusza Ferenc Stadion, Budapest
Attendance: 12,000
Referee: Clive Thomas (Wales)

16 September 1976

Lokomotiv Plovdiv (Bulgaria)	2–1	(Socialist Federal Republic of Yugoslavia) Red Star Belgrade
Fidanov 30'; Bonev 46'	Report	Filipović 19'

9th September Stadium, Plovdiv
Attendance: 13,000
Referee: Heinz Einbeck (East Germany)

=== Second leg ===
29 September 1976

Schalke 04 (West Germany)	3–2	(Portugal) Porto
Fichtel 74' (pen.); Abramczik 86'; Fischer 88'	Report	Oliveira 51', 69'

Parkstadion, Gelsenkirchen
Attendance: 32,000
Referee: Jack Taylor (England)

Schalke 04 won 5–4 on aggregate.

29 September 1976

Slovan Bratislava (Czechoslovakia)	5–0	(Iceland) Fram
Pekárik 22'; Ondruš 39'; Barto 51'; Čapkovič 58'; Atlason 72' (o.g.)	Report

Tehelné pole, Bratislava
Attendance: 6,000
Referee: Nikola Dudin (Bulgaria)

Slovan Bratislava won 8–0 on aggregate.

29 September 1976
20:00

(Switzerland) Basel	3–0	(Northern Ireland) Glentoran
Nielsen 33'; Mundschin 35'; Demarmels 73'	Report

St. Jakob Stadium, Basel
Attendance: 9,600
Referee: Cesare Gussoni (Italy)

Basel won 5–3 on aggregate.

28 September 1976

Kaiserslautern (West Germany)	8–0	(Cyprus) Enosis Neon Paralimni
Toppmöller 18', 35', 37', 72'; Pirrung 31', 67'; Meier 68'; Riedl 83'	Report

Betzenbergstadion, Kaiserslautern
Attendance: 5,210
Referee: Norbert Rolles (Luxembourg)

Kaiserslautern won 11–1 on aggregate.

29 September 1976

Dynamo Moscow (Soviet Union)	2–1 (a.e.t.)	(Greece) AEK Athens
Bubnov 43'; Yakubik 52' (pen.)	Report	Konstantinou 120' (pen.)

Central Dynamo Stadium, Moscow
Attendance: 18,000
Referee: Hugh Alexander (Scotland)

AEK Athens won 3–2 on aggregate.

29 September 1976

Manchester United (England)	2–0	(Netherlands) Ajax
Macari 42'; McIlroy 65'	Report

Old Trafford, Manchester
Attendance: 58,918
Referee: Georges Konrath (France)

Manchester United won 2–1 on aggregate.

29 September 1976

Adanaspor (Turkey)	2–0	Austria Salzburg
Ertürk 2'; Çınar 88'	Report

Adana 5 Ocak Stadium, Adana
Attendance: 9,161
Referee: Mitko Chukov (Bulgaria)

Austria Salzburg won 5–2 on aggregate.

29 September 1976

Barcelona (Spain)	3–2	(Portugal) Belenenses
Rexach 33'; Asensi 53'; Clares 87'	Report	Vasques 43'; José Rocha 55'

Camp Nou, Barcelona
Attendance: 20,000
Referee: Bruno Della Bruna (Switzerland)

Barcelona won 5-4 on aggregate.

29 September 1976

Wisła Kraków (Poland)	2–0	(Scotland) Celtic
Kmiecik 53', 59'	Report

Stadion Miejski Wisły, Kraków
Attendance: 28,065
Referee: Ertuğrul Dilek (Turkey)

Wisła Kraków won 4-2 on aggregate.

29 September 1976

Finn Harps (Republic of Ireland)	1–4	(England) Derby County
McFarland 1' (o.g.)	Report	Hector 26', 31'; George 81', 89'

Finn Park, Ballybofey
Attendance: 2,217
Referee: Jacques van Melkebeeke (Belgium)

Derby County won 16–1 on aggregate.

30 September 1976

Milan (Italy)	2–1	(Romania) Dinamo București
Calloni 26'; Silva 74'	Report	Sătmăreanu 9'

San Siro, Milan
Attendance: 36,194
Referee: John Wright Paterson (Scotland)

Milan won 2–1 on aggregate.

29 September 1976

Holbæk (Denmark)	1–0	(West Germany) Eintracht Braunschweig
Tofte-Hansen 70'	Report

Holbæk Stadium, Holbæk
Attendance: 1,013
Referee: Martti Hirviniemi (Finland)

Eintracht Braunschweig won 7–1 on aggregate.

29 September 1976

Nice (France)	2–1	(Spain) Espanyol
Bjeković 22', 71'	Report	Ortiz Aquino 60' (pen.)

Stade du Ray, Nice
Attendance: 13,000
Referee: Erich Linemayr (Austria)

Espanyol won 4–3 on aggregate.

29 September 1976

Djurgården (Sweden)	2–1	(Netherlands) Feyenoord
Karlsson 2'; Stenbäck 51'	Report	Jansen 66'

Råsunda Stadium, Stockholm
Attendance: 1,737
Referee: Pavel Kazakov (Soviet Union)

Feyenoord won 4–2 on aggregate.

29 September 1976

Videoton (Hungary)	4–0	(Turkey) Fenerbahçe
Wollek 50'; Kovács 57'; Szalmásy 66', 85'	Report

Sóstói Stadion, Székesfehérvár
Attendance: 22,000
Referee: Ian Foote (Scotland)

Videoton won 5–2 on aggregate.

29 September 1976

Hibernians (Malta)	0–2	(Switzerland) Grasshoppers
	Report	Seiler 54'; Cornioley 77' (pen.)

Hibernians Stadium, Paola
Attendance: 828
Referee: Miloš Čajić (Yugoslavia)

Grasshoppers won 9–0 on aggregate.

29 September 1976

Sochaux (France)	0–0	(Scotland) Hibernian
	Report

Stade Auguste Bonal, Montbéliard
Attendance: 8,136
Referee: Sergio Gonella (Italy)

Hibernian won 1–0 on aggregate.

29 September 1976

Budapest Honvéd (Hungary)	1–1	(Italy) Inter Milan
Póczik 26'	Report	Muraro 89'

Népstadion, Budapest
Attendance: 21,000
Referee: Gordon Kew (England)

Budapest Honvéd won 2–1 on aggregate.

29 September 1976

Tychy (Poland)	1–1	(West Germany) Köln
Ogaza 18'	Report	Müller 75'

Stadion Miejski, Tychy
Attendance: 15,000
Referee: Frans Derks (Netherlands)

Köln won 3–1 on aggregate.

29 September 1976

Öster (Sweden)	2–0	(Finland) KuPS
Strömberg 59'; Svensson 81'	Report

Värendsvallen, Växjö
Attendance: 1,400
Referee: Jan Łazowski (Poland)

Öster won 4–3 on aggregate.

29 September 1976

Cesena (Italy)	3–1	(East Germany) Magdeburg
Mariani 29'; Pepe 51'; Macchi 73'	Report	Sparwasser 69'

Stadio Dino Manuzzi, Cesena
Attendance: 18,000
Referee: Lajos Somlai (Hungary)

Magdeburg won 4–3 on aggregate.

29 September 1976

Juventus (Italy)	2–0	(England) Manchester City
Scirea 36'; Boninsegna 69'	Report

Stadio Comunale, Turin
Attendance: 46,472
Referee: Francis Rion (Belgium)

Juventus won 2–1 on aggregate.

29 September 1976

Molenbeek (Belgium)	4–0	(Denmark) Næstved
Koens 22'; Boskamp 30', 54'; Cordiez 76'	Report

Oscar Bossaert Stadium, Brussels
Attendance: 3,427
Referee: Ángel Franco Martínez (Spain)

Molenbeek won 7–0 on aggregate.

29 September 1976

Brann (Norway)	0–7	(England) Queens Park Rangers
	Report	Webb 2'; Givens 35', 70'; Bowles 68', 84', 88'; Thomas 86'

Brann Stadion, Bergen
Attendance: 11,500
Referee: Jan Keizer (Netherlands)

Queens Park Rangers won 11–0 on aggregate.

29 September 1976

Lokeren (Belgium)	3–1	(Luxembourg) Red Boys Differdange
Mommens 16'; Hansen 26'; Lubański 36'	Report	Flenghi 30' (pen.)

Daknamstadion, Lokeren
Attendance: 4,604
Referee: Eric Smyton (Northern Ireland)

Lokeren won 6–1 on aggregate.

29 September 1976

Akademik Sofia (Bulgaria)	3–0 (a.e.t.)	(Czechoslovakia) Slavia Prague
Dimitrov 35', 69'; Yankov 103'	Report

Stadion Akademik, Sofia
Attendance: 3,000
Referee: Emmanuel Platopoulos (Greece)

Akademik Sofia won 3–2 on aggregate.

29 September 1976
17:30

BFC Dynamo (East Germany)	1–1	(Soviet Union) Shakhtar Donetsk
Noack 11'	Report	Rohovsky 16'

Friedrich-Ludwig-Jahn-Sportpark, Berlin
Attendance: 15,000
Referee: Malcolm Wright (Northern Ireland)

Shakhtar Donetsk won 4–1 on aggregate.

29 September 1976

Olympiacos (Greece)	2–1	(Romania) Sportul Studențesc
Galakos 51'; Karavitis 57' (pen.)	Report	Necula 30' (pen.)

Karaiskakis Stadium, Piraeus
Attendance: 38,000
Referee: Thomas Reynolds (Wales)

Sportul Studențesc won 4–2 on aggregate.

29 September 1976

Start (Norway)	0–5	(Austria) Wacker Innsbruck
	Report	Koncilia 5', 60'; Stering 19', 31' (pen.); Welzl 88'

Kristiansand Stadion, Kristiansand
Attendance: 3,400
Referee: Ole Amundsen (Denmark)

Wacker Innsbruck won 7–1 on aggregate.

29 September 1976

Dinamo Zagreb (Socialist Federal Republic of Yugoslavia)	3–0	(Romania) Târgu Mureș
Senzen 28', 79'; Bogdan 75'	Report

Maksimir, Zagreb
Attendance: 20,000
Referee: Martin Horbas (Czechoslovakia)

Dinamo Zagreb won 4–0 on aggregate.

29 September 1976

Athletic Bilbao (Spain)	5–0	(Hungary) Újpest
Rojo 13', 44'; Dani 25', 30', 54'	Report

San Mamés Stadium, Bilbao
Attendance: 32,000
Referee: Ferdinand Biwersi (West Germany)

Athletic Bilbao won 5–1 on aggregate.

30 September 1976

Red Star Belgrade (Socialist Federal Republic of Yugoslavia)	4–1	(Bulgaria) Lokomotiv Plovdiv
Bogićević 37'; Filipović 41', 47'; Stamenković 60'	Report	Bonev 15'

Red Star Stadium, Belgrade
Attendance: 29,122
Referee: Nicolae Rainea (Romania)

Red Star Belgrade won 5–3 on aggregate.

== Second round ==
Team 1	Agg.	Team 2	1st leg	2nd leg
AEK Athens (Greece)	5–2	(England) Derby County	2–0	3–2
Akademik Sofia (Bulgaria)	4–5	(Italy) Milan	4–3	0–2
Austria Salzburg	2–2 (a)	(Socialist Federal Republic of Yugoslavia) Red Star Belgrade	2–1	0–1
Barcelona (Spain)	3–2	(Belgium) Lokeren	2–0	1–2
Basel (Switzerland)	2–4	(Spain) Athletic Bilbao	1–1	1–3
Eintracht Braunschweig (West Germany)	2–3	(Spain) Espanyol	2–1	0–2
Hibernian (Scotland)	3–4	(Sweden) Öster	2–0	1–4
Wacker Innsbruck (Austria)	1–2	(Hungary) Videoton	1–1	0–1
Kaiserslautern (West Germany)	2–7	(Netherlands) Feyenoord	2–2	0–5
Köln (West Germany)	5–2	(Switzerland) Grasshoppers	2–0	3–2
Magdeburg (East Germany)	4–2	(Socialist Federal Republic of Yugoslavia) Dinamo Zagreb	2–0	2–2
Manchester United (England)	1–3	(Italy) Juventus	1–0	0–3
Shakhtar Donetsk (Soviet Union)	6–2	(Hungary) Budapest Honvéd	3–0	3–2
Slovan Bratislava (Czechoslovakia)	5–8	(England) Queens Park Rangers	3–3	2–5
Sportul Studențesc (Romania)	0–5	(West Germany) Schalke 04	0–1	0–4
Wisła Kraków (Poland)	2–2 (4–5 p)	(Belgium) Molenbeek	1–1	1–1 (a.e.t.)

=== First leg ===
20 October 1976

AEK Athens (Greece)	2–0	(England) Derby County
Wagner 65', 69'	Report

AEK Stadium, Nea Filadelfeia
Attendance: 27,000
Referee: Francis Rion (Belgium)

20 October 1976

Akademik Sofia (Bulgaria)	4–3	(Italy) Milan
Paunov 18'; Manolov 25'; Dimitrov 40' (pen.); Bigon 50' (o.g.)	Report	Capello 33', 80'; Collovati 47'

Vasil Levski National Stadium, Sofia
Attendance: 4,000
Referee: Georges Konrath (France)

20 October 1976

Austria Salzburg	2–1	(Socialist Federal Republic of Yugoslavia) Red Star Belgrade
P. Schwarz 72'; W. Schwarz 74' (pen.)	Report	Filipović 35'

Stadion Lehen, Salzburg
Attendance: 19,000
Referee: György Müncz (Hungary)

20 October 1976

Barcelona (Spain)	2–0	(Belgium) Lokeren
Cruyff 79'; Clares 89'	Report

Camp Nou, Barcelona
Attendance: 35,000
Referee: Richard Casha (Malta)

20 October 1976
20:00

Basel (Switzerland)	1–1	(Spain) Athletic Bilbao
Marti 2'	Report	Madariaga 45'

St. Jakob Stadium, Basel
Attendance: 13,500
Referee: Rudi Glöckner (East Germany)

20 October 1976

Eintracht Braunschweig (West Germany)	2–1	(Spain) Espanyol
Frank 16'; Stolzenburg 53'	Report	Marañón 23'

Eintracht-Stadion, Braunschweig
Attendance: 22,000
Referee: Ulf Eriksson (Sweden)

20 October 1976

Hibernian (Scotland)	2–0	(Sweden) Öster
Blackley 34'; Brownlie 36' (pen.)	Report

Easter Road, Edinburgh
Attendance: 10,879
Referee: Heinz Aldinger (West Germany)

20 October 1976

Wacker Innsbruck (Austria)	1–1	(Hungary) Videoton
Stering 53'	Report	Czeczeli 62' (pen.)

Tivoli Old, Innsbruck
Attendance: 8,000
Referee: André Favre (Switzerland)

20 October 1976

Kaiserslautern (West Germany)	2–2	(Netherlands) Feyenoord
Briegel 27', 65'	Report	de Jong 39'; N. Jansen 41'

Betzenbergstadion, Kaiserslautern
Attendance: 14,500
Referee: Pablo Sánchez Ibáñez (Spain)

20 October 1976

Köln (West Germany)	2–0	(Switzerland) Grasshoppers
Konopka 37'; Müller 77'	Report

Müngersdorfer Stadion, Cologne
Attendance: 18,000
Referee: Malcolm Wright (Northern Ireland)

20 October 1976

Magdeburg (East Germany)	2–0	(Socialist Federal Republic of Yugoslavia) Dinamo Zagreb
Steinbach 18'; Zapf 55'	Report

Ernst Grube Stadium, Magdeburg
Attendance: 29,000
Referee: Hugh Alexander (Scotland)

20 October 1976

Manchester United (England)	1–0	(Italy) Juventus
Hill 32'	Report

Old Trafford, Manchester
Attendance: 59,021
Referee: Ferdinand Biwersi (West Germany)

20 October 1976
19:00

Shakhtar Donetsk (Soviet Union)	3–0	(Hungary) Budapest Honvéd
Shevlyuk 3'; Starukhin 35'; Vasin 82'	Report

Shakhtar Stadium, Donetsk
Attendance: 12,000
Referee: Michal Jursa (Czechoslovakia)

20 October 1976

Slovan Bratislava (Czechoslovakia)	3–3	(England) Queens Park Rangers
Novotný 12'; Haraslín 51'; Ondruš 61'	Report	Bowles 23', 66'; Givens 29'

Tehelné pole, Bratislava
Attendance: 30,000
Referee: Ángel Franco Martínez (Spain)

20 October 1976

Sportul Studențesc (Romania)	0–1	(West Germany) Schalke 04
	Report	Fischer 59'

Stadionul Republicii, Bucharest
Attendance: 2,500
Referee: Doğan Babacan (Turkey)

20 October 1976

Wisła Kraków (Poland)	1–1	(Belgium) Molenbeek
Kapka 6'	Report	Olsen 76'

Stadion Miejski Wisły, Kraków
Attendance: 16,843
Referee: William Gow (Wales)

=== Second leg ===
3 November 1976

Derby County (England)	2–3	(Greece) AEK Athens
George 53'; Rioch 88'	Report	Nikoloudis 64'; Konstantinou 79'; Wagner 85'

Baseball Ground, Derby
Attendance: 28,000
Referee: Heinz Einbeck (East Germany)

AEK Athens won 5–2 on aggregate.

3 November 1976

Milan (Italy)	2–0	(Bulgaria) Akademik Sofia
Calloni 13'; Morini 29'	Report

San Siro, Milan
Attendance: 25,869
Referee: Erich Linemayr (Austria)

Milan won 5–4 on aggregate.

3 November 1976

Red Star Belgrade (Socialist Federal Republic of Yugoslavia)	1–0	Austria Salzburg
Filipović 80'	Report

Red Star Stadium, Belgrade
Attendance: 20,000
Referee: Jack Taylor (England)

2–2 on aggregate; Red Star Belgrade won on away goals.

4 November 1976

Lokeren (Belgium)	2–1	(Spain) Barcelona
Verheyen 17'; Dalving 25'	Report	Cruyff 54'

Daknamstadion, Lokeren
Attendance: 18,000
Referee: Ian Foote (Scotland)

Barcelona won 3–2 on aggregate.

3 November 1976
20:00

Athletic Bilbao (Spain)	3–1	(Switzerland) Basel
Villar 45'; Carlos 61', 68'	Report	Marti 66'

San Mamés, Bilbao
Attendance: 26,922
Referee: Patrick Partridge (England)

Athletic Bilbao won 4–2 on aggregate.

3 November 1976

Espanyol (Spain)	2–0	(West Germany) Eintracht Braunschweig
Jeremías 40', 60' (pen.)	Report

Sarrià Stadium, Barcelona
Attendance: 25,000
Referee: Clive Thomas (Wales)

Espanyol won 3–2 on aggregate.

3 November 1976

Öster (Sweden)	4–1	(Scotland) Hibernian
Linderoth 20', 80'; Ejderstedt 35', 53'	Report	Smith 81'

Värendsvallen, Växjö
Attendance: 1,715
Referee: Olavi Peltola (Finland)

Öster won 4–3 on aggregate.

3 November 1976

Videoton (Hungary)	1–0	(Austria) Wacker Innsbruck
Nagy II 23'	Report

Sóstói Stadion, Székesfehérvár
Attendance: 16,000
Referee: Robert Schaut (Belgium)

Videoton won 2–1 on aggregate.

3 November 1976

Feyenoord (Netherlands)	5–0	(West Germany) Kaiserslautern
W. Jansen 16'; N. Jansen 18'; de Jong 40'; van Deinsen 44'; Schneider 74' (pen.)	Report

De Kuip, Rotterdam
Attendance: 36,000
Referee: Alberto Michelotti (Italy)

Feyenoord won 7–2 on aggregate.

3 November 1976

Grasshoppers (Switzerland)	2–3	(West Germany) Köln
Bauer 75' (pen.); Bosco 85'	Report	Müller 56'; Elkjær 58', 79'

Hardturm, Zürich
Attendance: 12,500
Referee: Marijan Rauš (Yugoslavia)

Köln won 5–2 on aggregate.

3 November 1976

Dinamo Zagreb (Socialist Federal Republic of Yugoslavia)	2–2	(East Germany) Magdeburg
Kranjčar 15', 31'	Report	Streich 17'; Pommerenke 51'

Stadion Maksimir, Zagreb
Attendance: 20,585
Referee: Sergio Gonella (Italy)

Magdeburg won 4–2 on aggregate.

3 November 1976

Juventus (Italy)	3–0	(England) Manchester United
Boninsegna 29', 63'; Benetti 85'	Report

Stadio Comunale, Turin
Attendance: 66,632
Referee: Károly Palotai (Hungary)

Juventus won 3–1 on aggregate.

3 November 1976
18:00

Budapest Honvéd (Hungary)	2–3	(Soviet Union) Shakhtar Donetsk
Kozma 35', 70' (pen.)	Report	Shevlyuk 52'; Reznik 60', 66'

Népstadion, Budapest
Attendance: 18,000
Referee: Ernst Dörflinger (Switzerland)

Shakhtar Donetsk won 6–2 on aggregate.

3 November 1976

Queens Park Rangers (England)	5–2	(Czechoslovakia) Slovan Bratislava
Givens 19', 33', 51' (pen.); Bowles 36'; Clement 85'	Report	Ondruš 60'; Čapkovič 65'

Loftus Road, London
Attendance: 22,001
Referee: César Correia (Portugal)

Queens Park Rangers won 8–5 on aggregate.

3 November 1976

Schalke 04 (West Germany)	4–0	(Romania) Sportul Studențesc
Bongartz 2', 78'; Fischer 15', 24'	Report

Parkstadion, Gelsenkirchen
Attendance: 40,000
Referee: Pavel Kazakov (Soviet Union)

Schalke 04 won 5–0 on aggregate.

3 November 1976

Molenbeek (Belgium)	1–1 (a.e.t.)	(Poland) Wisła Kraków
Nielsen 28'	Report	Maculewicz 35'
Penalties
Lafont (penalty scored); Nielsen (penalty missed); Olsen (penalty scored); Teugels (penalty scored); Boskamp (penalty scored); Wellens (penalty scored)	5–4	(penalty scored) Kusto; (penalty missed) Maculewicz; (penalty scored) Płaszewski; (penalty scored) Nawałka; (penalty scored) Kapka; (penalty missed) Szymanowski

Oscar Bossaert Stadium, Brussels
Attendance: 8,000
Referee: Josef Bucek (Austria)

2–2 on aggregate; Molenbeek won 5–4 on penalties.

== Third round ==
Team 1	Agg.	Team 2	1st leg	2nd leg
AEK Athens (Greece)	3–3 (a)	(Socialist Federal Republic of Yugoslavia) Red Star Belgrade	2–0	1–3
Athletic Bilbao (Spain)	5–4	(Italy) Milan	4–1	1–3
Espanyol (Spain)	0–3	(Netherlands) Feyenoord	0–1	0–2
Juventus (Italy)	3–1	(Soviet Union) Shakhtar Donetsk	3–0	0–1
Magdeburg (East Germany)	5–1	(Hungary) Videoton	5–0	0–1
Öster (Sweden)	1–8	(Spain) Barcelona	0–3	1–5
Queens Park Rangers (England)	4–4 (a)	(West Germany) Köln	3–0	1–4
Molenbeek (Belgium)	2–1	(West Germany) Schalke 04	1–0	1–1

=== First leg ===
24 November 1976

AEK Athens (Greece)	2–0	(Socialist Federal Republic of Yugoslavia) Red Star Belgrade
Papaioannou 19'; Mavros 28'	Report

AEK Stadium, Nea Filadelfeia
Attendance: 24,856
Referee: Viktor Zharkov (Soviet Union)

24 November 1976

Athletic Bilbao (Spain)	4–1	(Italy) Milan
Dani 45' (pen.), 81'; Carlos 48', 86'	Report	Capello 25'

San Mamés Stadium, Bilbao
Attendance: 36,000
Referee: Charles Corver (Netherlands)

24 November 1976

Espanyol (Spain)	0–1	(Netherlands) Feyenoord
	Report	de Felipe 32' (o.g.)

Sarrià Stadium, Barcelona
Attendance: 45,000
Referee: Adolf Prokop (East Germany)

24 November 1976
20:30

Juventus (Italy)	3–0	(Soviet Union) Shakhtar Donetsk
Bettega 16'; Tardelli 19'; Boninsegna 38'	Report

Stadio Comunale, Turin
Attendance: 42,545
Referee: Dušan Maksimović (Yugoslavia)

24 November 1976

Magdeburg (East Germany)	5–0	(Hungary) Videoton
Streich 7'; Tyll 23', 60'; Mewes 54'; Pommerenke 80'	Report

Ernst Grube Stadium, Magdeburg
Attendance: 15,000
Referee: Ulf Eriksson (Sweden)

24 November 1976

Öster (Sweden)	0–3	(Spain) Barcelona
	Report	Clares 37', 50'; Neeskens 46'

Värendsvallen, Växjö
Attendance: 14,700
Referee: Thomas Reynolds (Wales)

24 November 1976

Queens Park Rangers (England)	3–0	(West Germany) Köln
Givens 39'; Webb 41'; Bowles 74'	Report

Loftus Road, London
Attendance: 21,143
Referee: Paul Schiller (Austria)

24 November 1976

Molenbeek (Belgium)	1–0	(West Germany) Schalke 04
Lafont 86'	Report

Oscar Bossaert Stadium, Brussels
Attendance: 10,000
Referee: António Garrido (Portugal)

=== Second leg ===
8 December 1976

Red Star Belgrade (Socialist Federal Republic of Yugoslavia)	3–1	(Greece) AEK Athens
Baralić 21'; Filipović 30'; Savić 33'	Report	Wagner 25'

Red Star Stadium, Belgrade
Attendance: 61,000
Referee: Alberto Michelotti (Italy)

3–3 on aggregate; AEK Athens won on away goals.

8 December 1976

Milan (Italy)	3–1	(Spain) Athletic Bilbao
Calloni 53', 84' (pen.); Biasiolo 60'	Report	Madariaga 88' (pen.)

San Siro, Milan
Attendance: 32,898
Referee: Walter Eschweiler (West Germany)

Athletic Bilbao won 5–4 on aggregate.

8 December 1976

Feyenoord (Netherlands)	2–0	(Spain) Espanyol
Kreuz 29'; N. Jansen 76'	Report

De Kuip, Rotterdam
Attendance: 54,280
Referee: Robert Wurtz (France)

Feyenoord won 3–0 on aggregate.

8 December 1976
19:00

Shakhtar Donetsk (Soviet Union)	1–0	(Italy) Juventus
Shevlyuk 35'	Report

Shakhtar Central Stadium, Donetsk
Attendance: 38,000
Referee: Hilmi Ok (Turkey)

Juventus won 3–1 on aggregate.

8 December 1976

Videoton (Hungary)	1–0	(East Germany) Magdeburg
Nagy II 21'	Report

Sóstói Stadion, Székesfehérvár
Attendance: 6,000
Referee: Nicolae Rainea (Romania)

Magdeburg won 5–1 on aggregate.

8 December 1976

Barcelona (Spain)	5–1	(Sweden) Öster
Clares 3'; Cruyff 11'; Asensi 33', 52'; Heredia 81'	Report	Evesson 64'

Camp Nou, Barcelona
Attendance: 30,000
Referee: Alfred Delcourt (Belgium)

Barcelona won 8–1 on aggregate.

8 December 1976

Köln (West Germany)	4–1	(England) Queens Park Rangers
Müller 22', 60'; Löhr 33'; Weber 36'	Report	Masson 4'

Müngersdorfer Stadion, Cologne
Attendance: 37,000
Referee: Pablo Sánchez Ibáñez (Spain)

4–4 on aggregate; Queens Park Rangers won on away goals.

7 December 1976

Schalke 04 (West Germany)	1–1	(Belgium) Molenbeek
Abramczik 45'	Report	Teugels 25'

Parkstadion, Gelsenkirchen
Attendance: 35,000
Referee: Pat Partridge (England)

Molenbeek won 2–1 on aggregate.

== Quarter-finals ==
Team 1	Agg.	Team 2	1st leg	2nd leg
Athletic Bilbao (Spain)	4–3	(Spain) Barcelona	2–1	2–2
Feyenoord (Netherlands)	1–2	(Belgium) Molenbeek	0–0	1–2
Magdeburg (East Germany)	1–4	(Italy) Juventus	1–3	0–1
Queens Park Rangers (England)	3–3 (6–7 p)	(Greece) AEK Athens	3–0	0–3 (a.e.t.)

=== First leg ===
3 March 1977

Athletic Bilbao (Spain)	2–1	(Spain) Barcelona
Churruca 40'; Dani 63' (pen.)	Report	Asensi 13'

San Mamés Stadium, Bilbao
Attendance: 39,000
Referee: Michel Kitabdjian (France)

3 March 1977

Feyenoord (Netherlands)	0–0	(Belgium) Molenbeek
	Report

De Kuip, Rotterdam
Attendance: 39,636
Referee: Heinz Aldinger (West Germany)

2 March 1977

Magdeburg (East Germany)	1–3	(Italy) Juventus
Sparwasser 32'	Report	Cuccureddu 2'; Benetti 58'; Boninsegna 60'

Ernst Grube Stadium, Magdeburg
Attendance: 33,000
Referee: Thomas Reynolds (Wales)

3 March 1977

Queens Park Rangers (England)	3–0	(Greece) AEK Athens
Francis 7' (pen.), 11' (pen.); Bowles 43'	Report

Loftus Road, London
Attendance: 23,039
Referee: Ole Amundsen (Denmark)

=== Second leg ===
16 March 1977

Barcelona (Spain)	2–2	(Spain) Athletic Bilbao
Cruyff 24', 63'	Report	Irureta 13', 29'

Camp Nou, Barcelona
Attendance: 65,000
Referee: Cesare Gussoni (Italy)

Athletic Bilbao won 4–3 on aggregate.

16 March 1977

Molenbeek (Belgium)	2–1	(Netherlands) Feyenoord
Wellens 40'; Teugels 83' (pen.)	Report	de Jong 32'

Oscar Bossaert Stadium, Brussels
Attendance: 22,000
Referee: Franz Wöhrer (Austria)

Molenbeek won 2–1 on aggregate.

16 March 1977

Juventus (Italy)	1–0	(East Germany) Magdeburg
Cuccureddu 16'	Report

Stadio Comunale, Turin
Attendance: 45,541
Referee: Ken Burns (England)

Juventus won 4–1 on aggregate.

16 March 1977

AEK Athens (Greece)	3–0 (a.e.t.)	(England) Queens Park Rangers
Mavros 8', 65'; Papaioannou 82'	Report
Penalties
Konstantinou (penalty scored); Theodoridis (penalty scored); Ravousis (penalty scored); Nikoloudis (penalty missed); Wagner (penalty scored); Intzoglou (penalty scored); Zarzopoulos (penalty scored); Papaioannou (penalty scored)	7–6	(penalty scored) McLintock; (penalty scored) Masson; (penalty scored) Hollins; (penalty missed) Eastoe; (penalty scored) Bowles; (penalty scored) Givens; (penalty scored) Shanks; (penalty missed) Webb

AEK Stadium, Nea Filadelfeia
Attendance: 33,000
Referee: Ferdinand Biwersi (West Germany)

3–3 on aggregate; AEK Athens won 7–6 on penalties.

== Semi-finals ==
Team 1	Agg.	Team 2	1st leg	2nd leg
Molenbeek (Belgium)	1–1 (a)	(Spain) Athletic Bilbao	1–1	0–0
Juventus (Italy)	5–1	(Greece) AEK Athens	4–1	1–0

=== First leg ===
6 April 1977

Molenbeek (Belgium)	1–1	(Spain) Athletic Bilbao
Teugels 87'	Report	Churruca 29'

Oscar Bossaert Stadium, Brussels
Attendance: 18,000
Referee: Walter Hungerbühler (Switzerland)

6 April 1977

Juventus (Italy)	4–1	(Greece) AEK Athens
Cuccureddu 18'; Bettega 59', 83'; Causio 67'	Report	Papadopoulos 31'

Stadio Comunale, Turin
Attendance: 60,922
Referee: Viktor Zharkov (Soviet Union)

=== Second leg ===
20 April 1977

Athletic Bilbao (Spain)	0–0	(Belgium) Molenbeek
	Report

San Mamés Stadium, Bilbao
Attendance: 38,000
Referee: Adolf Prokop (East Germany)

1–1 on aggregate; Athletic Bilbao won on away goals.

20 April 1977

AEK Athens (Greece)	0–1	(Italy) Juventus
	Report	Bettega 84'

AEK Stadium, Nea Filadelfeia
Attendance: 32,000
Referee: Károly Palotai (Hungary)

Juventus won 5–1 on aggregate.

== Final ==
=== First leg ===
4 May 1977
20:30

Juventus (Italy)	1–0	(Spain) Athletic Bilbao
Tardelli 14'	Report

Stadio Comunale, Turin
Attendance: 65,812
Referee: Charles Corver (Netherlands)

=== Second leg ===
18 May 1977
20:00

Athletic Bilbao (Spain)	2–1	(Italy) Juventus
Irureta 12'; Carlos 78'	Report	Bettega 7'

San Mamés Stadium, Bilbao
Attendance: 39,700
Referee: Erich Linemayr (Austria)

2–2 on aggregate; Juventus won on away goals.
