= 1993–94 Danish Cup =

Tournament details
- Country: Denmark

Final positions
- Champions: Brøndby IF
- Runners-up: Næstved IF

The 1993–94 Danish Cup was the 40th season of the Danish Cup, the highest football competition in Denmark. The final was played on 12 May 1994.

== First round ==
| Team 1 | Score | Team 2 |
|---|---|---|
| Ammitsbøl/Jerlev IF | 0–2 | Skive IK |
| Bramming BK | 5–1 | IK Skovbakken |
| Christianshavns IK | 2–5 | Taarbæk IF |
| Dragør BK | 3–0 | B 1921 |
| Døllefjelde-Musse IF | 4–7 | BK Prespa |
| Esbjerg IF 92 | 2–1 | Lemvig GF |
| Herlufsholm GF | 4–3 | Holbæk B&I |
| Herning KFUM | 1–1 (a.e.t.) (5–4 p) | Egebjerg IF |
| Kolding BK | 3–0 | Allested U&IF |
| Kolding IF | 0–2 | Struer BK |
| BK Marienlyst | 1–3 | Asaa BK |
| Nødebo IF | 1–6 | Albertslund IF |
| Roskilde BK | 3–4 | Humlebæk BK |
| Ryvang FC | 1–3 | Valby BK |
| Sankt Klemens Fangel IF | 7–4 | Lindholm IF |
| Slagelse B&I | 1–3 | IF Skjold Birkerød |
| Sundby BK | 4–0 | Maribo BK |
| Tuse Næs BK | 0–5 | Gentofte-Vangede IF |
| Taars-Ugilt IF | 3–2 | Dalum IF |
| Tårup IF | 4–5 (a.e.t.) | Køge BK |
| IK Viking Rønne | 0–1 | Avedøre IF |
| Vivild IF | 3–2 (a.e.t.) | Aarup BK |
| Vorup Frederiksberg BK | 4–1 | Aarhus Fremad |
| Aabenraa BK | 3–1 | Aalborg Freja |

== Second round ==
| Team 1 | Score | Team 2 |
|---|---|---|
| Albertslund IF | 2–5 (a.e.t.) | Kastrup BK |
| Asaa BK | 1–2 | Randers Freja |
| BK Avarta | 1–0 | Herlufsholm GF |
| FC Fredericia | 1–3 (a.e.t.) | Haderslev FK |
| Frederikshavn fI | 3–0 (a.e.t.) | Aabenraa BK |
| Gentofte-Vangede IF | 1–2 | Hvidovre IF |
| Herlev IF | 5–1 | Taarbæk IF |
| Herning Fremad | 0–1 | Holstebro BK |
| Herning KFUM | 1–4 | Esbjerg IF 92 |
| Hellerup IK | 4–1 | Avedøre IF |
| Humlebæk BK | 0–3 | AB Gladsaxe |
| Køge BK | 9–4 | Dragør BK |
| Nørre Aaby IK | 5–3 | Kolding BK |
| Roskilde BK | 1–3 | IF Skjold Birkerød |
| Skive IK | 5–0 | Bramming BK |
| Struer BK | 1–0 | Sankt Klemens Fangel IF |
| Sundby BK | 2–1 | BK Prespa |
| Taars-Ugilt IF | 1–0 | Vorup Frederiksberg BK |
| Valby BK | 1–3 | Skovshoved IF |
| Vivild IF | 0–5 | Svendborg fB |

== Third round ==
| Team 1 | Score | Team 2 |
|---|---|---|
| B.93 | 4–1 | Kastrup BK |
| IF Skjold Birkerød | 0–1 | BK Avarta |
| Esbjerg fB | 1–0 | Esbjerg IF 92 |
| Frederikshavn fI | 3–5 (a.e.t.) | Svendborg fB |
| Fremad Amager | 3–1 (a.e.t.) | Ølstykke FC |
| Haderslev FK | 6–5 (a.e.t.) | B 1913 |
| Helsingør IF | 2–1 (a.e.t.) | Skovshoved IF |
| Herfølge BK | 5–0 | Vanløse IF |
| Herlev IF | 2–0 | Hvidovre IF |
| Hellerup IK | 0–1 (a.e.t.) | Skive IK |
| Holstebro BK | 2–1 | Vejle BK |
| Køge BK | 2–5 | Brønshøj BK |
| Nørresundby BK | 1–0 | Randers Freja |
| Nørre Aaby IK | 2–1 | Horsens fS |
| Struer BK | 5–0 | Taars-Ugilt IF |
| Sundby BK | 0–0 (a.e.t.) (8–9 p) | AB |

== Fourth round ==
| Team 1 | Score | Team 2 |
|---|---|---|
| AB | 1–0 | Svendborg fB |
| AGF | 10–1 | Haderslev FK |
| B 1909 | 2–1 | Herlev IF |
| B.93 | 1–4 | Skive IK |
| Brønshøj BK | 1–3 | Struer BK |
| Helsingør IF | 0–6 | Esbjerg fB |
| Herfølge BK | 5–2 | Viborg FF |
| Holstebro BK | 5–2 | BK Avarta |
| Ikast FS | 0–2 | Fremad Amager |
| Nørresundby BK | 1–4 (a.e.t.) | Næstved IF |
| Nørre Aaby IK | 2–4 | Lyngby BK |
| Silkeborg IF | 3–1 | BK Frem |

== Fifth round ==
| Team 1 | Score | Team 2 |
|---|---|---|
| AGF | 6–2 | Herfølge BK |
| B 1909 | 3–0 | F.C. Copenhagen |
| Brøndby IF | 2–1 | Odense BK |
| Fremad Amager | 5–3 | Skive IK |
| Lyngby BK | 5–3 | Esbjerg fB |
| Næstved IF | 6–0 | Struer BK |
| Silkeborg IF | 8–1 | Holstebro BK |
| AaB | 2–1 | AB |

== Quarter-finals ==
| Team 1 | Score | Team 2 |
|---|---|---|
| Lyngby BK | 3–3 (a.e.t.) (1–4 p) | AGF |
| Næstved IF | 3–1 | Fremad Amager |
| Silkeborg IF | 4–0 | B 1909 |
| AaB | 0–3 | Brøndby IF |

== Semi-finals ==
| Team 1 | Agg. | Team 2 | 1st leg | 2nd leg |
|---|---|---|---|---|
| Brøndby IF | 9–1 | AGF | 6–0 | 3–1 |
| Næstved IF | 5–3 | Silkeborg IF | 2–0 | 3–3 |

== Final ==
12 May 1994

| Brøndby IF | 0–0 (a.e.t.) | Næstved IF |
|---|---|---|
| | Report |
Penalties
| Høgh (penalty missed); Daugaard (penalty scored); Puggaard (penalty missed); Vilfort (penalty scored); Jensen (penalty scored) | 3–1 | (penalty scored) Bjerre; (penalty missed) Nonbo; (penalty missed) Nielsen; (penalty missed) Juel; (penalty missed) Hougaard |

Parken Stadium, Copenhagen
Attendance: 27,069
Referee: Lars Gerner
