= Næstved Boldklub =

Danish football club

Næstved
- Full name: Næstved Boldklub A/S
- Nickname: De Grønne (The Green (ones))
- Founded: 5 March 1939; 87 years ago, as Næstved Idræts Forening (NIF)
- Ground: TintShop Park, Næstved
- Capacity: 10,000 (2,181 covered seats)
- Chairman: Lars Holm Christensen
- Manager: Sune Lærkedahl Jensen
- League: Danish 2nd Division
- 2025–26: Danish 2nd Division, 3rd of 12
Home colours	Away colours

Næstved Boldklub is a Danish association football team based in Næstved in the South of Zealand. Næstved Boldklub is the professional superstructure of the parent club Næstved Idræts Forening (Næstved IF) and currently plays in the Danish 2nd Division, the third tier of Danish football league system.

The team's regular colours have been green and white throughout the club's history. It plays its home games at TintShop Park. The main rivals are Nykøbing FC (former B1901) and Slagelse B&I. Other rivals are Herfølge Boldklub and Køge Boldklub (the two clubs now merged to HB Køge).

Formerly a regular team in the top half of the Danish Superliga, Næstved has been tempting fate in the second and third tier since after the relegation. Since then Næstved Boldklub have been struggling financially which have been a factor in the club's struggles limiting and sometimes prevent the club from signing contracts with players.

== History ==
Næstved Idræts Forening (Næstved IF) was formed in 1939 as a union of Næstved Idræts Klub and Næstved Boldklub the latter which had already played a season in the Mesterskabs-serien (then the best league in Denmark). During the Second World War the Danish football leagues were replaced by geographical divisions. With the beginning of the 1945–1946 season the football pyramid was reestablished with Næstved being placed in the 3rd Division. In 1963 Næstved won promotion to the 2nd Division. In 1971 they finishied second to secure promotion to the 1st Division (the then top division in Denmark). Næstved finished third in their first season after promotion winning bronze medal in 1972.

After the club's three mostly successful decades from the 1970s until the 1990s, including two time runner-up in the league (1980 in front of an all time capacity record of 20,315 spectators at Næstved Stadion and again in 1988), the club was relegated following the 1995–1996 season after finishing last.

In 1996 Næstved Boldklub became the professional superstructure of the parent club Næstved Idræts Forening (Næstved IF).

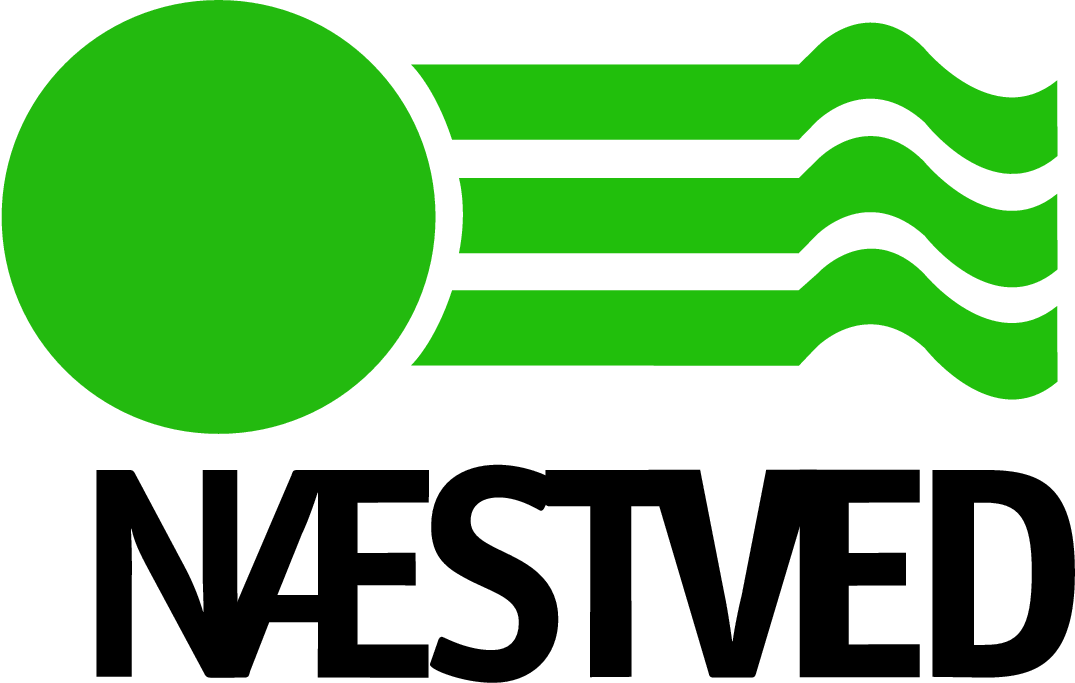
Næstved Boldklub badge, used in the seasons from 1986/1987 to 2018/2019.

In 2000 Næstved was relegated to the 2nd Division (third tier in Danish football league structure) for the first time since 1963. Enduring financial trouble the club was then several times just about to be relegated to Danmarks Serien (non-league), and if that would have happened, it would be the first time ever for Næstved not to be in one of the three best divisions of Denmark.

The team were promoted to the 1st division and participated in NordicBetLiga season 2018/2019. During the season Næstved was in the battle for a promotional spot, but in the last round of the season it was decided that Lyngby took 3rd place in front of Næstved, who finished 4th.

== Honours ==
- Danish Championship
  - Runners-up (2): 1980, 1988
- Danish Cup
  - Runners-up (1): 1993–94

Other results:

- 2003 – Danish indoor soccer champions
- 1994 – Danish Cup runners-up (losing the cup-final against Brøndby IF after penalties)
- 1988 – Silver medal winners
- 1987 – European Futsal indoor soccer champions
- 1986 – Bronze medal winners
- 1981 – Bronze medal winners
- 1980 – Silver medal winners
- 1975 – Bronze medal winners
- 1972 – Bronze medal winners

== Achievements ==
- 28 seasons in the Highest Danish League
- 33 seasons in the Second Highest Danish League
- 13 seasons in the Third Highest Danish League

== Players ==
=== Current squad ===
Updated 17 August 2026 Note: Flags indicate national team as defined under FIFA eligibility rules; some limited exceptions apply. Players may hold more than one non-FIFA nationality.

No.	Pos.	Nation	Player
1	GK	DEN	Albert Gaub-Jakobsen
2	DF	DEN	Christian Friedrich
3	DF	DEN	Jeppe Gertsen (on loan from AB)
4	DF	DEN	Tobias Elmelund
5	DF	DEN	Mathias Høst
6	MF	DEN	Benjamin Kold
8	MF	DEN	Mark Kongstedt
9	FW	DEN	Frederik Christensen
10	MF	DEN	Marinus Larsen
11	FW	DEN	Justin Shaibu
12	GK	DEN	Christian Levy Rasmussen
13	MF	DEN	Storm Hollensted
14	MF	DEN	Akwasi Owusu
15	DF	DEN	Carl Cordua
16	DF	DEN	Mads-Emil Langberg

No.	Pos.	Nation	Player
17	DF	DEN	Jonathan Krath
18	FW	DEN	Peter Plougmand
19	MF	DEN	Malthe Rugaard
20	MF	DEN	Hjalte Tarp Madsen
21	MF	DEN	Magnus Häuser
22	MF	DEN	Selim Baskaya
23	MF	DEN	Mads Lundgren
24	GK	DEN	Philip Thomsen
25	MF	DEN	Alexander Haumand
26	MF	DEN	Marius Christiansen
27	DF	DEN	Christoffer Daluiso
28	DF	DEN	Jes Palsmark
29	DF	DEN	Jeppe Vielsted
32	GK	DEN	Jonas El-Beltagi

=== Shirt number 7 ===
On 12 June 2006, Næstved midfielder Rasmus Green suddenly collapsed during training and was – in spite of subsequent reviving-attempts from fellow players, the physio and a present doctor – dead on arrival at Næstved Hospital. The number seven is retired in his memory.

== Recent history ==
Season		Pos.	Pl.	W	D	L	GS	GA	P	Cup	Notes
2005–06	2D	1	26	17	6	3	64	22	57	Fourth round	Promoted
2006–07	1D	8	30	12	7	11	54	35	43	First round	
2007–08	1D	8	30	11	7	12	36	39	40	Quarter-finals	
2008–09	1D	5	30	14	10	6	55	34	52	Fourth round	
2009–10	1D	6	30	13	5	12	44	34	44	First round	
2010–11	1D	10	30	8	9	13	43	44	33	Third round	
2011–12	1D	13	26	6	4	16	32	51	22	Third round	Relegated
2012–13	2D	4	30	17	8	5	64	32	59	Third round	
2013–14	2D	2	30	18	7	5	69	34	61	Third round	
2014–15	2D	1	30	22	1	7	66	30	67	First round	Promoted
2015–16	1D	10	33	10	4	19	37	48	34	Third round	
2016–17	1D	11	33	9	8	16	45	51	35	Quarter-finals	Relegated
2017–18	2D	2	22	14	4	4	41	21	46	Third round	Promoted
2018–19	1D	4	33	13	11	9	43	40	50	Quarter-finals	
2019–20	1D	12	33	5	11	17	29	50	26	Second round	Relegated
2020–21	2D	4	26	12	7	7	48	31	43	Second round	
2021–22	2D	1	32	22	7	3	60	33	73	First round	Promoted
2022–23	1D	5	32	11	10	11	50	48	43	Third round	
2023–24	1D	11	32	5	12	15	33	53	27	Third round	Relegated
2024–25	2D	6	32	10	6	16	28	48	36	First round	
2025–26	2D	3	32	16	6	10	46	42	54	First round	

Note: 1D = Danish 1st Division, 2D = Danish 2nd Division

== Records ==
=== Club records ===
Største tilskuertal

- 20.315 mod Kjøbenhavns Boldklub, 1. division, 1980

Største ligasejr

- 7–0 mod Værløse BK, 2. division Øst, 21. juli 2006
- 7–0 mod Korup Idrætsforening, 2. division, 15. juli 2003
- 7–0 mod Arbejdernes Idrætsklub Aarhus, 24. oktober 1965

Største sejr i europæiske turneringer

- 7–0 mod Bellinzona, Intertoto Cup, 4. juli 1987

Største liganederlag

- 0–9 mod Odense Boldklub, 1. division, 11. oktober 1998
- 0–7 mod Aarhus Fremad, 2. division, 3. maj 2025
- 0–7 mod Slagelse BK&IF, 3. division, 28. april 1946

Største nederlag i europæiske turneringer

- 0–7 PSV Eindhoven, UEFA Cup, 16 September 1981

=== Player records ===
Most appearances

#	Name	Nation	Apps	Goals
1	Frank Hougaard	(Denmark)	507	60
2	Mogens Hansen	(Denmark)	400	157
3	Søren Juel	(Denmark)	369	137
4	Torben Johansen	(Denmark)	355	22
5	Alex Nielsen	(Denmark)	311	99
6	Klaus Juliussen	(Denmark)	311	11
7	Jesper Christiansen	(Denmark)	+300	?
8	Benny Jacobsen	(Denmark)	282	26
9	Aage Hermansen	(Denmark)	277	116
10	Poul Nielsen	(Denmark)	261	66

Most European appearances: Mogens Hansen, 6 UEFA Cup matches

Top goalscorer in all competitions: Mogens Hansen, 157

Top European goalscorer: Mogens Hansen, 2

==== Danish internationals ====
Name	Born	Playing position	National Apps	National Goals	Næstved Apps	Næstved Goals
Jesper Olsen	20-03-1961	Midfield	43	5	66	12
Ole Rasmussen	19-03-1952	Midfield	41	1		
Bjarne Goldbæk	06-10-1968	Midfield	28	0	17	4
Jørgen Hansen	24-12-1931	Attack	23	3	309	
Jørgen Kristensen	12-12-1946	Midfield	19	3		
Keld Bak	07-06-1944	Attack	14	3		
Mark Strudal	29-04-1968	Attack	9	3	64	29
Jan Sørensen	24-08-1954	Attack	7	0		
Erik Dyreborg	20-01-1940	Attack	6	8		
Mogens Hansen	12-04-1956	Attack	5	1	427	
Svend Erik Christensen	17-03-1949	Midfield	4	1		
Henrik Skouboe	24-06-1955	Attack	3	0		
Bent Dideriksen	16-07-1931	Attack	2	0		
Kurt Jørgensen	01-10-1959	Attack	2	0		
Benny Nielsen	07-03-1951	Midfield	1	0		
John Povelsen	11-10-1957	Defense	1	0		
Michael Birkedal	18-11-1959	Defense	1	0		

== European performances ==
UEFA Cup 1973–74

19 September 1973
First round, 1st game

Fortuna Düsseldorf (Germany)	1–0	(Denmark) Næstved
Fred Hesse 52'

Rheinstadion, Düsseldorf
Referee: Kenneth Howard Burns (England)

3 October 1973
First round, 2nd game

Næstved (Denmark)	2–2	(Germany) Fortuna Düsseldorf
Bent Olsen 50'; Kurt Ottesen 89'		Wolfgang Seel 30'; Dieter Herzog 70'

Næstved Stadion, Næstved
Referee: Arne Axelsson (Sweden)

Fortuna Düsseldorf won 3–2 on aggregate.

UEFA Cup 1976–77

15 September 1976
First round, 1st game

Næstved (Denmark)	0–3	(Belgium) RWD Molenbeek
		Johan Boskamp 41'; Willy Wellens 85', 87'

Næstved Stadion, Næstved
Referee: Henry Obeig (Norway)

19 September 1976
First round, 2nd game

RWD Molenbeek (Belgium)	4–0	(Denmark) Næstved
Eddy Koens 22'; Johan Boskamp 30', 52' (pen.); Hubert Cordiez 76'

Edmond Machtens Stadium, Brussels
Referee: Angel Franco Martinez (Spain)

RWD Molenbeek won 7–0 on aggregate.

UEFA Cup 1981–82

16 September 1981
First round, 1st game

PSV Eindhoven (Netherlands)	7–0	(Denmark) Næstved
René van de Kerkhof 5'; Willy van de Kerkhof 10'; Hallvar Thoresen 17'; Ruud Geels 51', 61', 77'; Jung-moo Huh 80'

Philips Stadion, Eindhoven
Referee: Frederick Mcknight (Northern Ireland)

30 September 1981
First round, 2nd game

Næstved (Denmark)	2–1	(Netherlands) PSV Eindhoven
Mogens Hansen 55', 88'		Hallvar Thoresen 65'

Næstved Stadion, Næstved
Referee: Arto Ravander (Finland)

PSV Eindhoven won 8–2 on aggregate.

UEFA Cup 1989–90

13 September 1989
First round, 1st game

Zenit Leningrad (Soviet Union)	3–1	(Denmark) Næstved
Chukhlov 22'; Stepanov 60'; Popelnukha 74'		Kurt Jørgensen 19' (pen.)

Lenin Stadium, Leningrad
Attendance: 8,200
Referee: Eero Aho (Finland)

27 September 1989
First round, 2nd game

Næstved (Denmark)	0–0	(Soviet Union) Zenit Leningrad

Næstved Stadion, Næstved
Attendance: 4,184
Referee: Rune Larsson (Sweden)

Zenit St. Leningrad won 3–1 on aggregate.

1995 UEFA Intertoto Cup Group 4

25 June 1995

SC Heerenveen (Netherlands)	2–1	(Denmark) Næstved
Wilco Hellinga 64'; Erik Tammer 89'		Lars Jacobsen 48'

Abe Lenstra Stadion, Heerenveen

1 July 1995

Næstved (Denmark)	3–3	(Hungary) Békéscsaba 1912 Előre SE
Jensen 76'; Mads Spur-Mortensen 80'; Søren Juel 80'		Zsolt Kasik 12'; László Majos 33', 66'

Næstved Stadion, Næstved

8 July 1995

U.D. Leiria (Portugal)	1–1	(Denmark) Næstved
Bambo 64'		??? (??)

Estádio Municipal "Dr. Alves Vieira", Leiria

22 July 1995

Næstved (Denmark)	2–0	(Wales) Ton Pentre F.C.
Lars Jacobsen 34', 72'

Næstved Stadion, Næstved

Pos	Team	Pld	W	D	L	GF	GA	GD	Pts	Qualification	HEE	LEI	NÆS	BÉK	TON
1	(Netherlands) Heerenveen	4	3	0	1	13	2	+11	9	Advanced to round of 16	—	—	2–1	4–0	—
2	(Portugal) Leiria	4	2	2	0	7	3	+4	8		1–0	—	1–1	—	—
3	(Denmark) Næstved	4	1	2	1	7	6	+1	5		—	—	—	3–3	2–0
4	(Hungary) Békéscsaba	4	1	2	1	9	9	0	5		—	2–2	—	—	4–0
5	(Wales) Ton Pentre	4	0	0	4	0	16	−16	0		0–7	0–3	—	—	—

Source: rsssf.com
