= Queens Park Rangers F.C. in European football =

English club in European football

- Club: Queens Park Rangers
- Seasons played: 2
- First entry: 1976–77 UEFA Cup
- Latest entry: 1984–85 UEFA Cup

Queens Park Rangers Football Club is an English football club based in White City, London. The club was founded in 1882 and has competed in the English football league system since 1920. They have taken part in UEFA-sanctioned cup competition twice. They reached the quarter-finals of the UEFA Cup in the 1976–77 season, and the second round of the same competition in 1984–85.

== History ==
=== 1976–77 UEFA Cup ===
As league runners-up in the 1975–76 season, QPR qualified for the UEFA Cup for the first time in 1976–77, alongside fellow English clubs Derby County and the two Manchester clubs - City and United. They would first face SK Brann of Norway, and brush them aside 11–0 on aggregate, including a 7–0 win away at the Brann Stadion. In the second round, QPR met Czechoslovak outfit ŠK Slovan Bratislava. A 3–3 draw at Tehelné pole and a 5–2 victory at their Loftus Road home saw QPR progress to the third round, where West German club 1. FC Köln provided the opposition. A 3–0 home win for Rangers in the first leg was a good start, and although QPR were beaten 4–1 at the Müngersdorfer Stadion, the West Londoners went through to the quarter-final on the away goals rule. Their quarter-final opponents were AEK Athens of Greece. QPR - by now the last remaining English club in the tournament - took the home leg 3–0, but AEK matched it at the Nikos Goumas Stadium. The match went to penalties - and the Athens club won 7–6, eliminating QPR from the competition.

Season	Competition	Round	Opposition	Score
1976–77	UEFA Cup	First round	(Norway) SK Brann	4–0 (H), 0–7 (A)
1976–77	UEFA Cup	Second round	(Czechoslovakia) ŠK Slovan Bratislava	3–3 (A), 5–2 (H)
1976–77	UEFA Cup	Third round	(West Germany) 1. FC Köln	3–0 (H), 1–4 (A) (Note: Won on the away goals rule)
1976–77	UEFA Cup	Quarter-finals	(Greece) AEK Athens	3–0 (H), 0–3 (A) (Note: Lost 7–6 on penalties)

=== 1984–85 UEFA Cup ===
A finish of fifth in the 1983–84 season earnt QPR a second UEFA Cup campaign. English clubs Manchester United, Nottingham Forest, Southampton and Tottenham Hotspur also qualified for the 1984–85 tournament. QPR's first opponents this time were Icelandic club Knattspyrnufélag Reykjavíkur. A 3–0 away win at KR-völlur in Reykjavík and a 4–0 'home' win - QPR's home games in the UEFA Cup were held at Arsenal Stadium due to the artificial turf at Loftus Road - saw the London club progress to face Yugoslavian club FK Partizan, who now play in the Serbian SuperLiga. Rangers won the home leg 6–2, however a 4–0 loss in Belgrade meant that Partizan progressed due to the away goals rule.

Season	Competition	Round	Opposition	Score
1984–85	UEFA Cup	First Round	(Iceland) KR	0–3 (A), 4–0 (H)
1984–85	UEFA Cup	Second Round	(Socialist Federal Republic of Yugoslavia) FK Partizan	6–2 (H), 4–0 (A) (Note: Lost on the away goals rule)

=== 1985–91 ===
English clubs were banned from taking part in European competition in the aftermath of the Heysel Stadium disaster in 1985. The ban was in place until 1990–91, and England did not regain their pre-1985 number of places to award in European club competition until 1995–96. This resulted in the teams finishing fourth and fifth in the 1992–93 season - Blackburn Rovers and QPR respectively - missing out on a place in the 1993–94 UEFA Cup.

== Overall record ==
=== Record by competition ===
Competition	Pld	W	D	L	GF	GA	GD	Best performance
UEFA Cup	12	8	1	3	39	18	+21	Quarter-final (1976–77)
Total	12	8	1	3	39	18	+21	

=== Record by nation ===
Nation	Pld	W	D	L	GF	GA	GD	Opponents
Czechoslovakia	2	1	1	0	8	5	+3	Slovan Bratislava
Greece	2	1	0	1	3	3	0	AEK Athens
Iceland	2	2	0	0	7	0	+7	KR
Norway	2	2	0	0	11	0	+11	Brann
West Germany	2	1	0	1	4	4	0	Cologne
Yugoslavia	2	1	0	1	6	6	0	Partizan Belgrade
