= Kris Van De Putte =

Belgian footballer

Personal information
- Date of birth: 22 December 1975 (age 50)
- Height: 1.86 m (6 ft 1 in)
- Position: Goalkeeper

Senior career*
Years	Team	Apps	(Gls)
1997–1999	Oostende		
1999–2001	Beveren		
2001–2002	RWDM		
2002–2004	Mons		
- * Club domestic league appearances and goals

Kris Van De Putte (born 22 December 1975) is a Belgian football goalkeeper.
