= Edvin Hansen =

Danish footballer and coach (1920-1990)

Personal information
- Full name: Jens Peter Edvin Hansen
- Date of birth: 21 January 1920
- Place of birth: Køge, Denmark
- Date of death: 30 March 1990 (aged 70)
- Place of death: Køge, Denmark
- Position: Midfielder

Senior career*
Years	Team	Apps	(Gls)
1938–1946	Køge Boldklub		
1946–1947	Grimsby Town	1	(0)
1947–1952	Køge Boldklub		

International career
1948–1951	Denmark	14	(3)

Managerial career
- 1974–1978: Køge Boldklub
Medal record
Men's football
Representing Denmark
Olympic Games
Bronze medal – third place	1948 London	Team
- * Club domestic league appearances and goals

Jens Peter Edvin Hansen (21 January 1920 – 30 March 1990), known in England as Edwin Hansen, was a Danish footballer. He was also part of Denmark's squad for the football tournament at the 1948 Summer Olympics, but he did not play in any matches.

== Club career ==
Hansen mainly played for hometown club Køge Boldklub during his career. He had a one-year stint with Grimsby Town in the First Division, making only one appearance. His performance was skewered with deadly politeness in A Who's Who of Grimsby Town: "Hansen was somewhat out of his depth in an English first division match."

== International career ==
Hansen gained his first cap for Denmark on 15 June 1948 in a 3–0 win against Finland. He was also part of Denmark's squad for the football tournament at the 1948 Summer Olympics which finished third, but he did not play in any matches. He since captained the national team on three occasions.

== Managerial career ==
Hansen managed Køge Boldklub from 1974 to 1978, miraculously winning the Danish Football Championship in the 1975 season.

== Honours ==
=== Player ===
Denmark

- Olympic Bronze Medal: 1948

=== Manager ===
Køge Boldklub

- 1st Division: 1975
