= 1980 Danish 1st Division =

35th season of Danish 1st Division

Danish 1st Division
- Season: 1980

The 1980 Danish 1st Division season was the 35th season of the Danish 1st Division league championship, governed by the Danish Football Association. It constituted the 67th edition of the Danish football championship, and saw Kjøbenhavns Boldklub win their fifteenth and last championship title.

The Danish champions qualified for the European Cup 1981-82, while the second placed teams qualified for the UEFA Cup 1981-82. The three lowest placed teams of the tournament were directly relegated to the Danish 2nd Division for the following season. Likewise, the Danish 2nd Division champions and two first runners-up were promoted to the 1st Division.

== Table ==
Pos	Team	Pld	W	D	L	GF	GA	GD	Pts
1	KB	30	16	8	6	59	35	+24	40
2	Næstved IF	30	18	4	8	56	36	+20	40
3	Odense BK	30	14	10	6	45	31	+14	38
4	Aarhus GF	30	14	8	8	50	40	+10	36
5	Ikast FS	30	16	3	11	43	42	+1	35
6	B 93	30	13	8	9	60	40	+20	34
7	B 1903	30	13	8	9	44	35	+9	34
8	Vejle BK	30	14	5	11	63	50	+13	33
9	Køge BK	30	12	8	10	39	39	0	32
10	Esbjerg fB	30	10	10	10	41	35	+6	30
11	Hvidovre IF	30	11	8	11	47	48	−1	30
12	Lyngby BK	30	11	5	14	52	48	+4	27
13	Kastrup BK	30	9	9	12	34	35	−1	27
14	Fremad Amager	30	9	8	13	36	53	−17	26
15	BK Frem	30	4	4	22	25	69	−44	12
16	Aalborg BK	30	2	2	26	27	85	−58	6

== Results ==
Home \ Away	AaB	AGF	B93	B03	EfB	BKF	AMA	HIF	IFS	KAS	KB	KBK	LBK	NIF	OB	VBK
Aalborg BK	—	2–5	1–5	0–1	2–4	1–1	3–2	0–3	1–3	0–2	2–5	1–6	0–3	0–1	1–3	2–5
Aarhus GF	3–1	—	2–1	2–1	2–2	0–0	5–2	2–2	3–2	0–0	0–1	0–0	1–0	1–4	1–1	2–0
B.93	2–0	2–4	—	2–2	4–0	0–1	3–1	6–1	0–1	2–2	1–1	1–2	2–2	2–0	3–1	0–2
B 1903	1–0	1–3	1–0	—	3–2	4–1	1–1	0–1	0–1	1–2	2–4	2–2	2–1	2–1	2–2	1–1
Esbjerg fB	2–0	1–0	0–1	1–3	—	2–0	2–2	0–0	1–2	1–0	1–1	5–0	2–1	0–2	0–0	2–0
BK Frem	1–3	1–2	1–7	1–1	2–1	—	3–0	0–4	2–4	1–5	0–1	0–3	1–3	2–3	1–2	0–2
Fremad Amager	2–1	2–1	1–2	2–1	1–1	2–0	—	2–1	1–0	1–1	1–2	0–1	1–1	0–3	0–0	1–3
Hvidovre IF	3–1	3–1	0–0	1–0	0–0	2–1	3–0	—	2–2	1–0	1–1	2–0	3–4	1–2	1–1	4–1
Ikast fS	1–0	0–0	3–0	0–3	1–1	3–0	2–1	4–2	—	1–0	1–2	2–1	1–0	1–0	1–3	3–1
Kastrup BK	1–1	0–2	2–3	0–0	2–2	1–0	1–2	1–0	3–0	—	0–0	3–0	1–0	1–4	0–0	1–2
Kjøbenhavns BK	3–0	3–0	1–3	0–2	0–3	1–3	7–2	3–0	4–1	3–0	—	2–2	1–1	3–1	2–2	3–1
Koge BK	2–1	2–1	2–2	2–0	0–0	1–0	0–2	1–1	0–1	1–0	1–0	—	3–3	0–2	1–2	2–1
Lyngby BK	4–1	1–2	1–2	1–3	0–2	3–0	4–2	2–1	3–0	4–1	1–2	1–0	—	1–2	0–0	1–2
Naestved IF	2–1	2–2	2–1	0–1	2–1	1–1	0–0	2–1	3–1	0–2	1–1	3–1	5–2	—	3–1	1–2
Odense BK	2–0	3–1	1–1	0–2	2–1	2–1	1–1	4–0	1–0	1–0	2–0	0–2	3–0	1–2	—	1–2
Vejle BK	7–1	0–2	2–2	1–1	2–1	5–0	0–1	7–3	4–1	2–2	0–2	1–1	2–4	3–2	2–3	—

Legend: Blue = home team win; Yellow = draw; Red = away team win.

== Top goalscorers ==
Position	Player	Club	Goals
1	Hans Aabech	KB	19
