= José Ignacio Churruca =

Spanish footballer

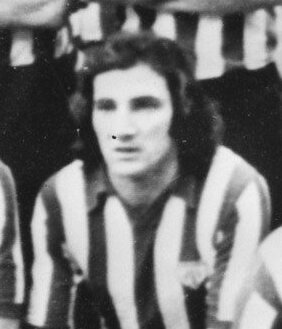
- Churruca in 1977

Personal information
- Full name: José Ignacio Churruca Sistiaga
- Date of birth: 28 January 1948 (age 78)
- Place of birth: Zarautz, Spain
- Height: 1.73 m (5 ft 8 in)
- Position: Forward

Youth career
- 1964–1967: Zarautz

Senior career*
| Years | Team | Apps | (Gls) |
| 1967–1976 | Sporting de Gijón | 274 | (51) |
| 1967–1968 | → Ensidesa (loan) | | |
| 1976–1980 | Athletic Bilbao | 85 | (19) |
| 1980–1982 | Hércules | 60 | (17) |
| 1982–1983 | Lorca | 9 | (0) |
| Total | | 428 | (87) |

International career
| 1971–1977 | Spain | 16 | (0) |
| 1975–1976 | Spain Olympic | 2 | (0) |
| 1978 | Basque Country | 1 | (0) |

Managerial career
- 1983–1984: Arenas
- 1989–1990: Chiclana
- 1990–1991: Portuense
- 1991–1992: Cádiz B
- 1992–1993: Algeciras
- 1993–1994: Peña Deportiva
- 2004–2005: Portuense
- * Club domestic league appearances and goals

José Ignacio Churruca Sistiaga (born 28 January 1949) is a Spanish former footballer who played as a forward.

He played 336 La Liga games and scored 73 goals, representing Sporting Gijón, Athletic Bilbao and Hércules. With Athletic, he was a runner-up in the Copa del Rey and UEFA Cup, both in 1977. He was capped 16 times by Spain between 1971 and 1977.

== Club career ==
Born in Zarautz in the Basque Country, Churruca began his career at Sporting de Gijón. He was part of their team that won the Segunda División in 1969–70, in a forward line also featuring the likes of Quini. On 29 December 1974, he scored a hat-trick in a 5–1 La Liga win at home to Granada, with Quini getting the other two goals; Churruca's opener came after 30 seconds with his other goals in the 6th and 24th minutes.

In August 1976, after Sporting's relegation, Churruca transferred back to his home region to join Athletic Bilbao, having played an important part in their elimination from the previous season's Copa del Generalísimo. The transfer fee was 22 million Spanish pesetas, with Sporting also having options to buy or loan certain Athletic players. The fee went towards the construction of Sporting's Mareo academy, which was completed in 1978. In his first season, he helped the club to the final of the UEFA Cup, scoring in a 2–1 home win over compatriots Barcelona in the quarter-final first leg, and away to Molenbeek of Belgium in the semi-final; however, the final was lost to Juventus on the away goals rule. Athletic also reached the final of the newly renamed Copa del Rey, with Churruca scoring in a 5–0 win over Sevilla at San Mamés in the quarter-finals; he played the full 120 minutes of the final against Real Betis and scored his attempt in the penalty shootout, though his team lost it 8–7.

Churruca signed for a two-year deal for free for Hércules in May 1980. At its expiration and with his club relegated, he moved to Lorca Deportiva in the Segunda División B. In December 1982, he publicly called manager Jesús Moreno Manzaneque an autocrat for coming to a restaurant where he was dining with his wife to inform him that he had broken curfew by 15 minutes, subsequently being dropped from the team and made to train alone.

== International career ==
Churruca made his international debut for Spain on 20 February 1971 in a 2–1 friendly win away to Italy in Cagliari. He was praised for his performance by Mundo Deportivo, who highlighted his duel with fellow debutant Aldo Bet. He totalled 16 appearances over the next six years, with no goals or major tournaments, though he played both legs of the 3–1 aggregate loss to West Germany in the UEFA Euro 1976 quarter-finals, which formed part of the qualification.

On 2 March 1978, Churruca played in the first match of the unofficial Basque Country team since the Spanish transition to democracy. The game finished as a goalless draw against the Soviet Union in Bilbao, with the opponents fielding the likes of Oleg Blokhin.
