= Brian Jensen =

Brian Jensen may refer to:

- Brian Jensen (footballer, born 1968), Danish football defender; played six games for the Danish national team
- Brian Jensen (footballer, born 1975), Danish football goalkeeper; played more than 300 games for English club Burnley
