= Kurt Jørgensen =

Canadian-born Danish footballer (born 1959)

Personal information
- Full name: Kurt Anker Jørgensen
- Date of birth: 1 October 1959 (age 67)
- Place of birth: British Columbia, Canada
- Height: 1.86 m (6 ft 1 in)
- Position: Forward

Senior career*
Years	Team	Apps	(Gls)
1980–1984	Holbæk B&I		
1984–1985	Køge BK	11	(0)
1985–1987	Holbæk B&I		
1987–1990	Næstved IF	78	(32)
1990–1992	Karlskrona AIF		
1993–1994	Næstved IF	5	(0)

International career
1988	Denmark	2	(0)
- * Club domestic league appearances and goals

Kurt Anker Jørgensen (born 1 October 1959) is a Danish former footballer who played as a forward. While at Næstved BK the team finished second in the 1988 Danish 1st Division league championship. In the same year, he played two international matches for the Denmark national team. For Holbæk B&I, he made 231 first-team matches scoring 79 goals.
