= Hougaard =

Hougaard is a Danish surname. Notable people with the surname include:

- Børge Hougaard (1921–2012), Danish rower
- Derick Hougaard (born 1983), South African rugby player
- Francois Hougaard (born 1988), South African rugby player
- Frank Hougaard (born 1963), Danish footballer
- Jesper Hougaard (born c. 1984), Danish poker player
- Patrick Hougaard (born 1989), Danish motorcycle speedway rider
