= Niels Tune-Hansen =

Danish footballer (born 1953)

Personal information
- Date of birth: 19 January 1953
- Place of birth: Holbæk, Denmark
- Date of death: 22 January 2026 (aged 73)
- Position: Defender

Senior career*
Years	Team	Apps	(Gls)
1973–1976	Holbæk B&I	64	(6)
1976–1979	FC St. Pauli	109	(13)
1979–1982	VfL Osnabrück	111	(14)
1982–1985	Holbæk B&I	105	(9)
Total		389	(42)

International career
1975–1978	Denmark	15	(1)
- * Club domestic league appearances and goals

Niels Tune-Hansen (19 January 1953 – 22 January 2026) was a Danish professional footballer who played as a defender. He made 15 appearances for the Denmark national team scoring one goal.

== Career ==
Tune-Hansen began his career in his hometown club Holbæk B&I, where he scored six goals in 64 games between 1972 and 1976.

Ahead of the 1976–77 2. Bundesliga season, Tune-Hansen moved to FC St. Pauli. He made his debut on 14 August 1975 in the 1–0 defeat by Wuppertaler SV, and scored his first goal in the game in a 1–1 draw against 1. SC Göttingen 05. Tune-Hansen becamea regular starter, played all 38 games and scoring eight goals. At the end of the season his team won promotion to the Bundesliga.

Tune-Hansen played his first Bundesliga game on the first matchday in a 3–1 win over Werder Bremen. At the end of the 1977–78 season, his club suffered direct relegation. That season, Tune-Hansen had scored one goal in 33 Bundesliga appearances, which was against Bayern Munich, but he also scored an own goal in the 4–0 defeat against 1. FC Saarbrücken.

After another season in the jersey of the St. Pauli, Tune-Hansen left the club after the club did not receive a license and was therefore relocated to the Oberliga Nord. He signed with VfL Osnabrück for the 1979–80 season. He made his debut on the first matchday of the season against SV Arminia Hannover (2–0 loss). There, too, he became a regular starter, and left the club after three years where they had finished in midtable in the 2. Bundesliga. His departure also marked the end of a six-year stint in Germany with 220 games and 27 goals. He then returned to hometown club Holbæk B&I.

After three more years in Holbæk, Tune-Hansen ended his active career in the 1985 season in Denmark.
