= Bob Dalving =

Belgian footballer

Personal information
- Full name: Robert Dalving
- Date of birth: 28 July 1950 (age 76)
- Place of birth: Antwerp, Belgium
- Position: Centre back

Senior career*
Years	Team	Apps	(Gls)
1969–1975	Beerschot VAV	146	(2)
1975–1984	Sporting Lokeren	216	(6)
1984–	Heirnis Gent		
Total		362	(8)

International career
1976	Belgium	1	(0)
- * Club domestic league appearances and goals

Robert "Bob" Dalving (born 28 July 1950) is a Belgian retired footballer, who played for Beerschot VAV and Sporting Lokeren in the top tier of the Belgian football pyramid.

Dalving scored once in Lokeren's famous home win over Spanish giants Barcelona in the 1976–77 UEFA Cup Second Round.

== International career ==
He played in one match for the Belgium national football team in May 1976, a European Championship qualification home game against the Netherlands.
