= Torben Hansen =

Danish footballer (born 1951)

Personal information
- Date of birth: 27 October 1951 (age 75)
- Place of birth: Skamstrup, Denmark
- Position: Forward

Senior career*
Years	Team	Apps	(Gls)
1969–1973	Knabstrup	?	(?)
1973	Holbæk B&I	?	(24)
1974	Bayern Munich	0	(0)
1974–1979	Holbæk B&I	?	(42)

International career
1973	Denmark	1	(0)
- * Club domestic league appearances and goals

Torben Hansen (born 27 October 1951) is a Danish former professional footballer who played as a forward. He made one appearance for the Denmark national team in 1973.
