= Lajos Szendrődi =

Hungarian footballer

Personal information
- Full name: Lajos Szendrődi Szoják
- Date of birth: 1913
- Place of birth: Austria-Hungary
- Date of death: 1968 (aged 54–55)
- Position: Striker

Senior career*
Years	Team	Apps	(Gls)
- Elöre FC Békéscsaba
- Elektromos FC

International career
1938	Hungary	2	(3)

Managerial career
- 1953–1956: Køge BK
- 1956: Denmark
- 1956–1957: Esbjerg fB
- 1957–1959: Djurgårdens IF
- 1960–1961: AIK
- 1966–1967: APOEL
- * Club domestic league appearances and goals

Lajos Szendrődi (1913–1968) was a Hungarian international footballer who played for Elöre FC Békéscsaba and Elektromos FC.

He managed Køge BK, Denmark (for one match), Esbjerg fB, Djurgårdens IF, AIK and APOEL. In 1954, he became Danish champions with Køge BK. This was also the first time a club outside Copenhagen became champions
