= Heinz Hildebrandt =

Danish football manager and former player (born 1943)

Personal information
- Full name: Karl Heinz Günther Hildebrandt
- Date of birth: 13 February 1943 (age 83)
- Place of birth: Kaunas, Generalbezirk Litauen
- Position: Goalkeeper

Youth career
- 1953–1958: Hedensted IF
- 1958–1961: Vejle Boldklub

Senior career*
Years	Team	Apps	(Gls)
1961–1967	Vejle Boldklub	157	(0)
1968–1973	Hvidovre IF	135	(0)
1973–1974	Glostrup IC	59	(0)
Total		351	(0)

International career
1965–1966	Denmark u-21	9	(0)
1970–1972	Denmark	3	(0)

Managerial career
- 1977–1978: Rosenhøj BK
- 1979–1980: BK Avarta
- 1981–1982: Avedøre IF
- 1983–1986: BK Avarta
- 1987: BK Hellas Copenhagen
- 1988–1990: Køge BK
- * Club domestic league appearances and goals

Heinz Hildebrandt (born 13 February 1943) is a Danish former football player and manager. He competed in the men's tournament at the 1972 Summer Olympics. Today he is a football manager agent and the owner of Dansk Træner Bureau.

== Honours ==
- Danish championship: 1973
