= Svend Hugger =

Danish footballer

Personal information
- Full name: Svend Dinnes Hugger
- Date of birth: 22 March 1925
- Place of birth: Dalum, Denmark
- Date of death: 30 May 2017 (aged 92)
- Position: Midfielder

Senior career*
Years	Team	Apps	(Gls)
- Odense BK

International career
1950	Denmark	2	(0)

Managerial career
- 1961: OB
- 1968: Køge BK
- 1972–1974: Silkeborg
- 1980–1981: Viborg
- * Club domestic league appearances and goals

Svend Dinnes Hugger (22 March 1925 – 30 May 2017) was a Danish footballer who played as a midfielder. He made two appearances for the Denmark national team in 1950.
