= Nico Jansen =

Dutch footballer (born 1953)

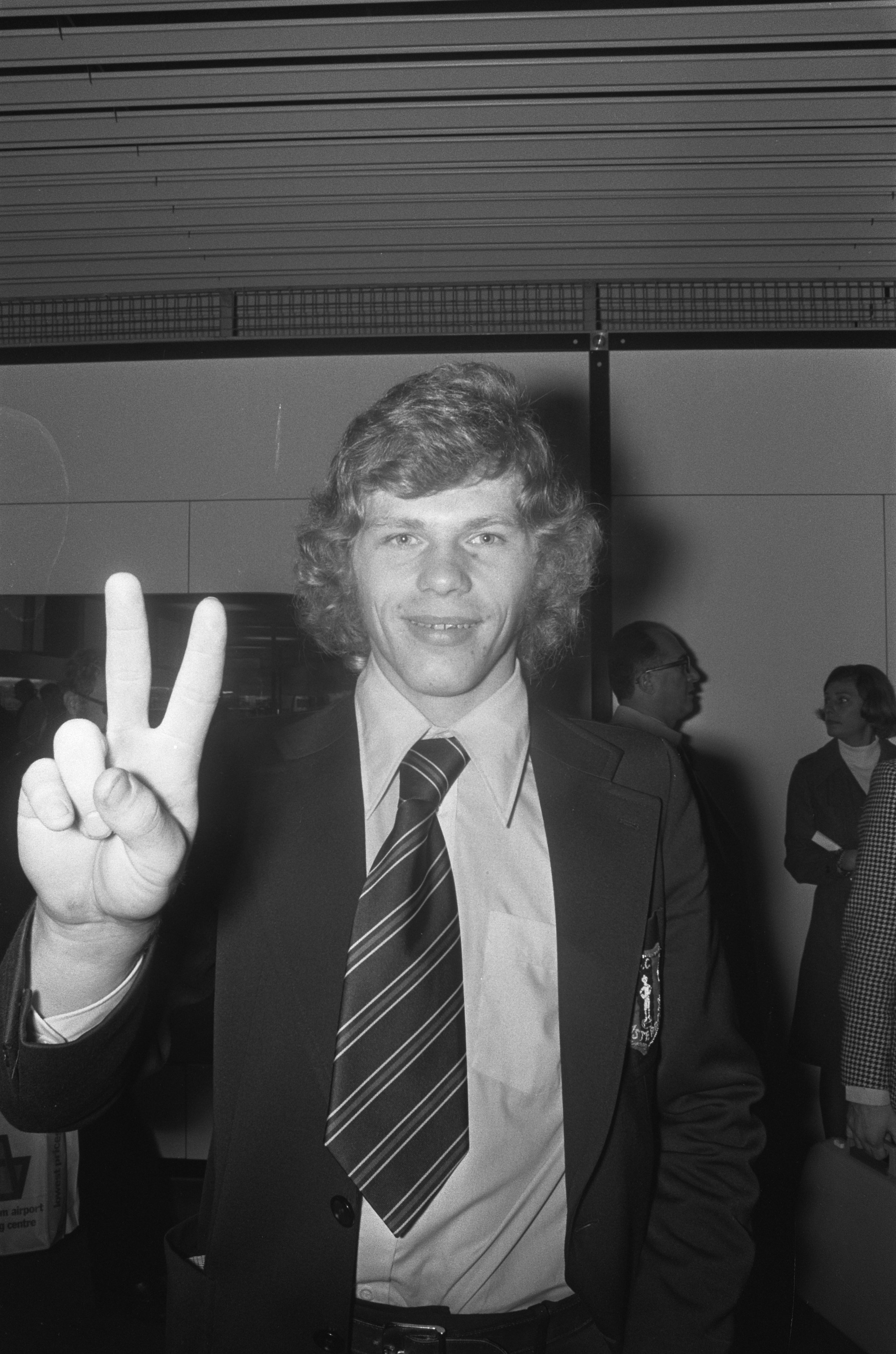
- Jansen pictured in October 1974

Personal information
- Full name: Nico Jansen
- Date of birth: 15 January 1953 (age 73)
- Place of birth: Amsterdam, Netherlands
- Position: Forward

Senior career*
Years	Team	Apps	(Gls)
1972–1975	FC Amsterdam	78	(41)
1975–1978	Feyenoord	68	(43)
1978–1983	RWD Molenbeek	154	(55)
1983–1984	Londerzeel		
1984–1986	Boom FC	32	(4)
Total		332	(143)

International career
1975	Netherlands	1	(0)
- * Club domestic league appearances and goals

Nico Jansen (born 15 January 1953) is a Dutch former professional footballer who played for FC Amsterdam, Feyenoord, RWD Molenbeek, Londerzeel, and Boom FC as well as the Netherlands national team.
