= Benno Larsen =

Danish footballer (born 1949)

Personal information
- Full name: Hans Benno Larsen
- Date of birth: 30 September 1949 (age 77)
- Place of birth: Kolding, Denmark
- Position: Goalkeeper

Senior career*
Years	Team	Apps	(Gls)
1968–1971	B1903		
1971–1972	GAIS	9	(0)
1972–1974	FC St. Pauli		(0)
1974–1976	Holbæk B&I		
1976–1978	FC Augsburg	23	(0)
1981	Akademisk Boldklub		
1982–1985	Holbæk B&I		

International career
1969–1973	Denmark	21	(0)
1974–1977	Denmark	16	(0)
- * Club domestic league appearances and goals

Hans Benno Larsen (born 30 September 1949) is a Danish footballer who played as a goalkeeper. He made 16 appearances for the Denmark national team from 1974 to 1977.
