= Michael Nonbo =

Danish footballer (born 1973)

Michael Nonbo (16 November 1973) is a Danish former professional football player, who played 355 games and scored 14 goals in the Danish Superliga from 1991 to 2006, representing Næstved IF, AGF, Viborg FF, and SønderjyskE. He played 16 games and scored three goals for the Denmark national under-21 football team from November 1993 to October 1995.
