= Willy Wellens =

Belgian footballer

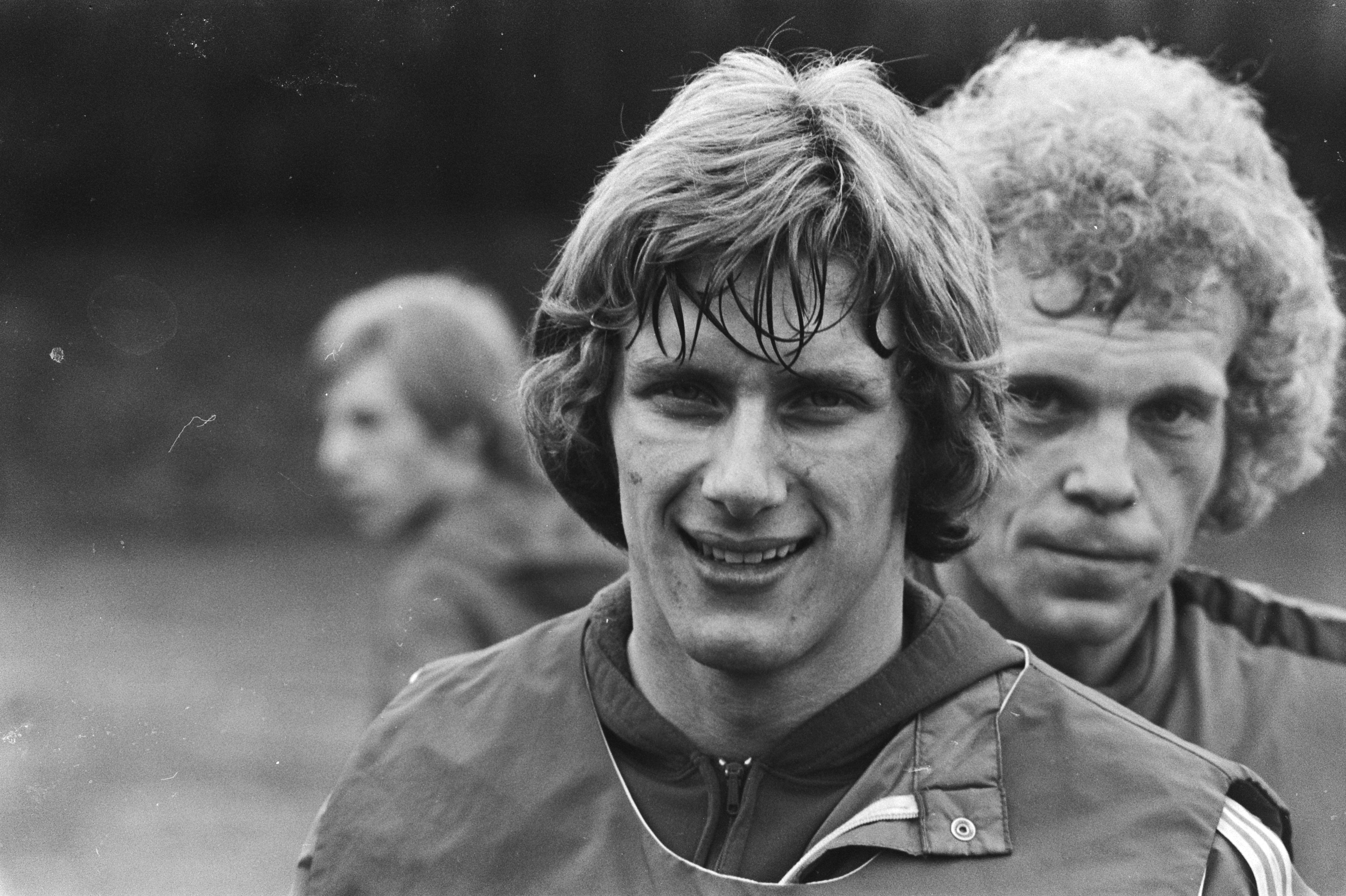
Willy Wellens and Kresten Bjerre

Willy Wellens (born 19 October 1954) is a retired Belgian footballer, who played as both a forward or midfielder.

During his career he played for K. Lierse S.K., R.W.D. Molenbeek, R. Standard de Liège, Club Brugge K.V., K. Beerschot V.A.C., and Cercle Brugge K.S.V. He earned 7 caps for the Belgium national football team, and participated in UEFA Euro 1980.

== Honours ==
=== Club ===
==== RWD Molenbeek ====
- Belgian First Division: 1974-75
- Jules Pappaert Cup: 1975
- Amsterdam Tournament: 1975

Standard Liège

- Belgian Cup: 1980–81
- Belgian Supercup:1981

Club Brugge

- Belgian Cup: 1985–86

=== International ===
Belgium

- UEFA European Championship: 1980 (runners-up)
- Belgian Sports Merit Award: 1980

=== Individual ===
- Belgian Fair Play Award: 1988
