= Volodymyr Rohovsky =

Soviet footballer (1954–2022)

Personal information
- Date of birth: 21 February 1954
- Place of birth: Kherson, Ukrainian SSR, Soviet Union
- Date of death: March 2022 (aged 68)
- Place of death: Kherson, Ukraine
- Position: Forward

Senior career*
Years	Team	Apps	(Gls)
1972	Lokomotyv Kherson		(2)
1973–1974	FC [Zvezda] Tiraspol		
1975–1982	Shakhtar Donetsk	179	(21)
1982	Krystal Kherson		

International career
1979	Ukrainian SSR		
- * Club domestic league appearances and goals

Volodymyr Rohovsky (21 February 1954 – March 2022) was a footballer from the former Soviet Union who played for Shakhtar Donetsk.

In 1979 Rohovsky played a couple of games for the Ukrainian SSR team at the Spartakiad of the Peoples of the USSR.

Rohovsky died in March 2022, at the age of 68.
