= Peter Strömberg =

Swedish footballer

Personal information
- Date of birth: April 23, 1956 (age 70)
- Position: Midfielder

Senior career*
Years	Team	Apps	(Gls)
1976–1980	Öster		
1981–1982	Djurgården		
- * Club domestic league appearances and goals

Peter Strömberg (born 23 April 1956) is a Swedish retired footballer. Strömberg made 22 Allsvenskan appearances for Djurgården and scored 2 goals.
