= René Flenghi =

Luxembourgish footballer

Personal information
- Full name: René Flenghi
- Date of birth: 7 January 1949 (age 72)
- Position: Defender

Senior career*
Years	Team	Apps	(Gls)
1969–1978	Red Boys Differdange		

International career
1970–1976	Luxembourg	37	(0)
- * Club domestic league appearances and goals

René Flenghi (born 7 January 1949) is a Luxembourgish former footballer. A defender, he played for the Luxembourg national football team and Red Boys Differdange. He also worked for ARBED.

== Honours ==
- Luxembourg Cup: 1

1971–72
