= Taarbæk IF =

Danish football club

- Full name: Taarbæk Idrætsforening af 1908 (Taarbæk Gimnastic Association of 1908)
- Nickname: De hvide (the white ones)
- Founded: 1908
- Ground: Springforbi Fodboldbaner
- Chairman: Morten Larsen
- Manager: Thomas Jensen
Home colours	Away colours

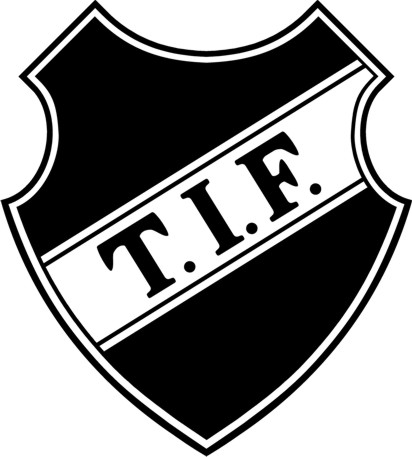
Coat of arms of the Taarbæk Sports Association

Taarbæk Idrætsforening (Taarbæk I.F., TIF) is a minor football club from Taarbæk, Denmark. The club was founded August 23, 1908 and is among the oldest Danish football clubs. The first team is playing in the serie 2, the seventh highest Danish league. The club plays its home games at the Springforbi football ground just north from Taarbæk City. The club competed in the 1969 and 1994 Danish Cup tournaments.

== Taarbæk IF Hall of fame ==
Name	Born	Dead	Appointed
Axel Løvdal	06.02.1882	28.10.1961	1920'erne
Edvard Yde	06.04.1895	15.04.1964	17.04.1929
Gunnar Wiggers	11.02.1898	28.08.1977	27.08.1933
Werner Hansen	31.03.1912	03.10.1985	23.08.1958
Erik Petersen	17.02.1922	20.12.1974	24.08.1968
Niels Jensen	29.12.1931		29.12.1991
Kaj Landsberger	03.11.1934	03.06.2002	18.04.2002
Flemming Henriksen	20.03.1968		23.08.2008

== Presidents ==
The president of the club is elected every odd year.

Name	Took office	Resigned
Alexander Olsen	1908	1910
Theodor Jensen	1911	1914
Erling Nielsen	1914	1914
Holger Nielsen	1914	1915
Axel Løvdal	1915	1920
Edvard Yde	1920	1920
N.J. Nielsen	1921	1922
Edvard Yde	1923	1928
Ingvar Jensen	1929	1931
Aage Arnold-Larsen	1932	1937
Kaj Rafsted	1938	1945
Knud Petersen	1946	1949
Kaj Rafsted	1950	1953
Henry Ruud	1954	1956
Sven-Erik Arnoldus	1957	1961
Elo Jørgensen	1961	1977
Poul Bløcher	1978	1983
Poul Erik Andersen	1984	1988
Kaj Landesberger	1989	2001
Henrik Olsen	2002	2004
Klaus Frøkjær	2005	2009
Morten Larsen	2009	–
