= 1974–75 Belgian First Division =

72nd season of top-tier football in Belgium

Belgian First Division
- Season: 1974–75

Statistics of Belgian First Division in the 1974–75 season.

== Overview ==
Location of teams in Belgian First Division 1974–75

It was contested by 20 teams, and R.W.D. Molenbeek won the championship. At the end of the season the division was reduced in size from 20 to 19 clubs, so three clubs were relegated, with two clubs promoted from Division II to replace them.

== League standings ==
Pos	Team	Pld	W	D	L	GF	GA	GD	Pts	Qualification or relegation
1	R.W.D. Molenbeek	38	25	11	2	92	39	+53	61	Qualified for 1975–76 European Cup
2	Royal Antwerp FC	38	22	8	8	75	29	+46	52	Qualified for 1975–76 UEFA Cup
3	R.S.C. Anderlecht	38	19	14	5	72	26	+46	52	Qualified for 1975–76 European Cup Winners' Cup
4	Club Brugge K.V.	38	19	11	8	79	34	+45	49	Qualified for 1975–76 UEFA Cup
5	Beerschot	38	19	10	9	58	34	+24	48	
6	Standard Liège	38	18	8	12	59	42	+17	44	
7	Lierse S.K.	38	18	6	14	52	52	0	42	
8	K.S.C. Lokeren Oost-Vlaanderen	38	15	12	11	51	48	+3	42	
9	K.S.V. Waregem	38	13	13	12	48	42	+6	39	
10	Cercle Brugge K.S.V.	38	12	13	13	37	43	−6	37	
11	R.F.C. de Liège	38	14	7	17	48	53	−5	35	
12	K.S.K. Beveren	38	11	12	15	29	42	−13	34	
13	Beringen FC	38	11	11	16	46	56	−10	33	
14	R. Charleroi S.C.	38	10	13	15	44	60	−16	33	
15	K Berchem Sport	38	8	16	14	34	47	−13	32	
16	A.S.V. Oostende K.M.	38	9	12	17	60	81	−21	30	
17	KV Mechelen	38	9	10	19	25	47	−22	28	
18	KFC Diest	38	8	7	23	32	70	−38	23	Relegated to Belgian Second Division
19	Olympic Montignies-sur-Sambre	38	6	11	21	30	87	−57	23	Relegated to Belgian Second Division
20	FC Winterslag	38	5	13	20	30	69	−39	23	Relegated to Belgian Second Division

== Results ==
Home \ Away	AND	ANT	BEE	BRC	BER	BEV	CER	CLU	CHA	DIE	FCL	LIE	LOK	MEC	MOL	OLY	OST	STA	WAR	WIN
Anderlecht		1–1	1–0	5–0	4–0	2–0	4–1	1–0	2–2	3–2	1–1	2–0	5–0	2–0	1–1	4–1	6–2	3–0	2–2	0–0
Antwerp	0–0		0–2	4–0	2–0	2–0	2–0	3–2	3–1	3–0	1–0	2–0	0–0	4–0	3–3	7–1	7–0	2–0	1–0	4–0
Beerschot	1–1	0–1		4–1	3–4	0–0	1–3	1–0	2–0	2–0	4–2	2–0	2–0	2–0	1–3	1–0	1–0	1–1	1–0	4–2
Berchem	1–0	0–0	1–2		1–0	0–0	2–2	1–0	0–0	1–1	0–0	0–1	0–2	1–0	2–3	3–0	1–1	1–1	1–1	2–1
Beringen	1–1	2–1	2–1	1–1		2–0	0–0	2–4	2–0	3–1	1–0	3–0	2–2	1–0	0–0	6–1	2–2	0–3	0–1	2–0
Beveren	0–0	0–2	2–2	0–0	1–1		1–2	1–0	1–0	2–1	2–0	2–0	3–1	0–2	0–0	2–0	1–1	2–1	1–1	2–1
Cercle Brugge	0–2	1–0	0–2	2–1	0–0	4–1		0–2	5–1	1–0	0–0	0–1	0–0	0–0	1–0	4–2	2–1	0–0	0–0	0–0
Club Brugge	3–1	0–0	1–2	0–3	2–2	1–1	2–0		2–2	5–0	3–1	4–0	2–2	2–0	2–2	8–0	1–1	2–0	5–0	7–0
Charleroi	2–2	1–2	1–0	2–2	2–1	1–0	1–2	0–2		3–0	1–1	0–0	0–1	1–1	1–5	7–1	1–0	0–4	1–0	2–1
Diest	1–1	0–2	2–2	0–2	1–1	0–0	2–3	0–2	4–1		1–0	0–2	0–2	1–0	2–0	1–1	2–0	0–0	0–2	1–0
Liège	1–0	0–2	0–4	3–1	2–1	1–0	2–0	0–1	0–1	3–2		1–0	3–1	3–2	0–1	3–0	2–2	2–0	0–1	3–3
Lierse	1–1	2–0	1–0	2–0	2–0	1–0	1–1	4–4	3–1	2–1	4–1		5–1	0–1	1–4	1–0	2–2	2–1	3–1	2–0
Lokeren	1–0	4–2	1–1	1–0	4–0	0–1	1–1	0–0	2–0	2–1	2–3	4–0		0–0	1–1	3–0	2–1	1–0	3–1	0–2
Mechelen	0–4	0–5	1–0	0–0	1–0	2–0	0–0	1–0	1–2	0–1	0–0	1–1	2–0		0–4	3–0	2–4	2–0	0–0	0–0
Molenbeek	1–0	2–0	0–0	1–0	3–0	1–0	3–0	0–0	1–1	7–1	3–1	2–1	3–1	3–2		4–1	5–3	3–2	3–1	5–1
Olympic M.-s.-S.	0–5	1–1	0–3	2–1	1–0	0–0	0–0	0–0	1–1	1–2	2–1	2–1	0–0	2–1	2–4		3–1	0–1	0–0	0–1
Oostende	0–2	2–2	0–1	2–1	2–1	3–0	4–2	1–4	1–1	3–1	3–1	2–4	2–2	2–0	1–2	3–3		1–2	1–1	2–1
Standard Liège	0–1	2–0	1–1	1–1	4–1	1–0	1–0	1–2	3–1	4–1	3–1	3–0	3–1	1–0	3–3	2–0	5–2		2–0	0–0
Waregem	0–0	1–0	1–1	1–1	2–1	6–0	2–0	1–2	1–1	1–0	0–3	0–2	1–2	1–0	2–2	2–2	4–1	4–0		1–0
Winterslag	0–2	1–4	1–1	1–1	1–1	0–3	1–0	0–2	1–1	3–0	0–3	3–0	1–1	0–0	1–4	0–0	1–1	2–3	0–5	

Legend: Blue = home team win; Yellow = draw; Red = away team win.

== Attendances ==
No.	Club	Average attendance
1	Anderlecht	19,632
2	Standard	18,210
3	Club Brugge	12,684
4	RWDM	11,816
5	Antwerp	11,605
6	Liège	11,132
7	Beringen	10,816
8	Charleroi	10,632
9	Olympic	10,368
10	Beerschot	9,684
11	Lierse	8,737
12	Waregem	7,947
13	Mechelen	7,579
14	Lokeren	7,263
15	Beveren	7,237
16	Oostende	6,747
17	Diest	6,553
18	Winterslag	5,684
19	Cercle	5,368
20	Berchem	4,974
