= 1975 Danish 1st Division =

30th season of Danish 1st Division

Danish 1st Division
- Season: 1975

Statistics of Danish 1st Division in the 1975 season.

== Overview ==
It was contested by 16 teams, and Køge BK won the championship.

== League standings ==
Pos	Team	Pld	W	D	L	GF	GA	GD	Pts
1	Køge BK	30	17	7	6	61	31	+30	41
2	Holbæk B&I	30	18	5	7	59	37	+22	41
3	Næstved IF	30	15	8	7	56	42	+14	38
4	Kjøbenhavns Boldklub	30	17	3	10	67	42	+25	37
5	Esbjerg fB	30	10	14	6	38	34	+4	34
6	Boldklubben 1903	30	13	7	10	52	36	+16	33
7	Aalborg Boldspilklub	30	14	5	11	63	49	+14	33
8	Vanløse IF	30	13	7	10	49	54	−5	33
9	B 1901	30	12	6	12	43	55	−12	30
10	Vejle Boldklub	30	9	8	13	46	53	−7	26
11	Boldklubben Frem	30	10	6	14	43	52	−9	26
12	Randers Sportsklub Freja	30	8	9	13	35	50	−15	25
13	Fremad Amager	30	10	4	16	45	54	−9	24
14	Boldklubben af 1893	30	6	10	14	33	47	−14	22
15	Slagelse B&I	30	8	4	18	35	58	−23	20
16	Boldklubben 1909	30	8	1	21	47	78	−31	17

== Results ==
Home \ Away	AaB	B93	B01	B03	B09	EfB	BKF	AMA	HOL	KB	KBK	NIF	RSF	SBI	VIF	VBK
Aalborg BK	—	4–4	1–0	0–2	8–2	1–1	2–2	4–0	3–1	5–0	0–1	1–2	3–0	1–3	0–1	2–1
B.93	1–1	—	1–1	0–0	2–3	1–1	2–1	1–0	2–3	1–0	0–2	0–1	4–2	0–1	0–0	3–1
B 1901	1–4	3–0	—	1–4	2–1	3–1	3–1	1–1	2–1	1–0	1–2	0–5	4–0	1–0	4–2	1–0
B 1903	0–1	3–0	1–1	—	3–0	0–1	3–0	1–0	1–3	3–4	1–1	5–1	4–0	1–1	2–2	3–1
B 1909	0–2	1–0	4–2	2–3	—	1–2	0–2	3–4	0–6	0–3	1–0	2–3	0–2	1–3	5–1	3–2
Esbjerg fB	3–0	1–1	0–0	1–1	1–0	—	1–1	2–1	1–1	0–4	0–0	0–0	2–1	4–1	1–1	1–2
BK Frem	2–3	0–2	5–3	1–0	2–0	3–1	—	2–2	2–0	1–3	0–2	1–3	3–1	4–3	0–2	0–1
Fremad Amager	0–3	0–0	0–1	4–1	5–2	3–2	2–1	—	3–1	1–0	2–3	3–1	1–2	1–1	2–3	5–0
Holbæk B&I	1–0	2–1	6–0	2–1	2–1	2–1	0–3	5–2	—	1–0	1–0	2–2	0–0	3–1	2–1	4–1
Kjøbenhavns BK	6–2	1–1	4–0	3–2	1–6	1–2	5–1	4–0	4–2	—	4–2	0–3	2–0	3–0	1–2	3–0
Køge BK	3–1	2–1	1–3	2–1	5–0	0–1	2–0	5–0	2–3	1–0	—	1–1	3–1	4–1	5–0	3–3
Næstved IF	3–0	0–0	1–0	0–2	3–1	1–1	1–1	1–0	1–3	2–2	1–1	—	3–0	3–2	2–3	1–4
Randers Freja	2–5	4–1	0–0	1–2	1–1	0–2	2–3	1–0	0–0	2–2	1–1	4–1	—	3–0	2–1	1–1
Slagelse B&I	1–2	2–1	3–1	0–1	0–5	1–1	1–1	0–2	2–0	0–1	0–2	1–5	0–1	—	1–2	1–0
Vanløse IF	4–2	1–0	2–2	2–0	7–2	2–2	2–0	1–0	0–0	0–4	2–4	1–3	0–0	0–4	—	4–2
Vejle BK	2–2	6–3	4–1	1–1	1–0	1–1	0–0	2–1	0–2	1–2	1–1	1–2	1–1	4–1	2–0	—

Legend: Blue = home team win; Yellow = draw; Red = away team win.
