= Luís Horta =

Portuguese footballer (born 1952)

Personal information
- Full name: Luís Manuel Alfar Horta
- Date of birth: 15 January 1952 (age 74)
- Place of birth: Lisbon, Portugal
- Position: Defender

Senior career*
Years	Team	Apps	(Gls)
1973–1974	Sintrense		
1974–1976	Atlético CP	53	(2)
1976–1980	Belenenses	100	(8)
1980–1981	Braga	21	(1)
1981–1982	Belenenses	21	(0)
1982–1983	Académica Coimbra	24	(4)
1983–1985	Barreirense		
1985–1986	Pêro Pinheiro		
1987–1988	Mortágua		
1989–1990	Figueiró dos Vinhos		

International career
1978	Portugal B	2	(1)
- * Club domestic league appearances and goals

Luís Manuel Alfar Horta (born 15 January 1952) is a former Portuguese football player.

He played 8 seasons and 195 games in the Primeira Liga for Belenenses, Atlético CP and Braga.

== Club career ==
He made his Primeira Liga debut for Atlético CP on 8 September 1974 in a game against Leixões.
