= Wolfgang Schwarz (footballer) =

Austrian footballer and manager

Personal information
- Date of birth: February 12, 1952
- Place of birth: Innsbruck, Austria
- Date of death: June 9, 2018
- Position: Forward

Senior career*
Years	Team	Apps	(Gls)
1972–1977	SV Austria Salzburg	96	(32)
1978–1979	Wattens/Wacker	11	(0)
1979–1980	Sparta Rotterdam	15	(0)
1980–1982	SPG Innsbruck		

Managerial career
- 1994: FC Tirol Innsbruck (interim)
- 1997–2000: WSG Wattens
- 2000–2001: SC Austria Lustenau
- 2005–2008: AKA Tirol U16
- 2010–2011: SPG Axams-Götzens
- 2011–2012: SV Telfs
- 2013–2015: SVG Mayrhofen
- * Club domestic league appearances and goals

Wolfgang Schwarz (February 12, 1952 – June 9, 2018) was a football manager and retired Austrian football forward.
