= Gerald Haider =

Austrian footballer

Personal information
- Date of birth: 1 July 1955 (age 71)
- Place of birth: Wels, Austria
- Height: 1.81 m (5 ft 11 in)
- Position: Forward

Senior career*
Years	Team	Apps	(Gls)
–1974	Hertha Wels		
1974–1978	Austria Salzburg	121	(33)
1978–1988	VÖEST Linz	240	(86)

International career
1976	Austria	1	(0)
- * Club domestic league appearances and goals

Gerald Haider (born 1 July 1955) is an Austrian former professional footballer who played as a forward. He made one appearance for the Austria national team in 1976.

During a 15-year club football career with SV Austria Salzburg and SK VÖEST Linz, Haider scored 119 goals in the Austrian Bundesliga. Haider began playing football with his hometown club WSC/Hertha Wels. At age 19, Haider joined Austria Salzburg where he would play for four and one-half seasons. At 1.81 meters, the imposing striker was among the all-time leading scorers of the Austrian Bundesliga.
