= Brian Jensen (footballer, born 1968) =

Danish footballer (born 1968)

Personal information
- Full name: Brian Boye Jensen
- Date of birth: 23 April 1968 (age 58)
- Place of birth: Glostrup, Denmark
- Height: 1.86 m (6 ft 1 in)
- Position: Defender

Senior career*
Years	Team	Apps	(Gls)
19??–19??	Glostrup IF 32		
19??–1994	Brøndby IF	125	(8)
1994–1997	Stade Rennais FC	51	(0)
1997–1998	AS Cannes	17	(2)
1998–1999	Brøndby IF	13	(0)

International career
1987	Denmark U-19	1	(0)
1988	Denmark U-21	2	(0)
1991–1994	Denmark	6	(0)
- * Club domestic league appearances and goals

Brian Boye Jensen (born 23 April 1968) is a Danish former football player, who most notably played for Danish club Brøndby IF, as well as Stade Rennais FC and AS Cannes in France. Jensen played six games for the Danish national team from 1991 to 1994.

== Career ==
Born in Glostrup, Jensen begun his career with local club Glostrup IF 32, before joining Brøndby IF. After a loan spell at Helsingør IF, Jensen got his breakthrough as a defender in Brøndby, and he made his Danish national team debut in June 1991. Jensen made six international appearances for Denmark over the next three years, under manager Richard Møller Nielsen. His sixth national team appearance came in June 1994.

In the winter 1994, Jensen moved abroad to play for Stade Rennais FC in France. He initially signed a half-year loan deal, for the remainder of the 1994–95 Ligue 1 season. In his first time at Rennais, Jensen was a mainstay in the defence, as the club finished 13th of 20 teams in the 1994–95 season. In the summer 1995, Jensen signed a three-year contract with Rennais, and was named team captain. With Rennais' purchase of French international defender Jean-Pierre Cyprien in the summer 1995, Jensen was dropped from the starting line-up halfway through the 1995–96 Ligue 1 season. In the summer of 1996, a number of clubs were reportedly interested in signing Jensen, including FC Lugano, Stoke City, Udinese Calcio, FC Utrecht, and Troyes AC, but they could not overcome the economic demands of Rennais. In the final stage of the 1996–97 Ligue 1 season, Rennais were in danger of relegation. Jensen was brought back into the starting formation, and helped the club stay in the top-flight league.

In the summer 1997, Jensen left Rennais for rival team AS Cannes, signing a two-year contract. Though he played 17 league games for Cannes in the first half of the 1997–98 Ligue 1 season, Jensen and his family never adjusted to life in Cannes, and wanted to return to Denmark in February 1998. Within a month, Jensen signed a two-year contract with defending Danish champions Brøndby IF, who bought him for 300.000 French franc. Having played 13 Superliga games for Brøndby, Jensen suffered a heel injury. Following surgery in the winter 1998, he retired from the game in the winter 1999, at age 31. Jensen played a total 166 first team games for Brøndby IF in all competitions.
