= Hubert Cordiez =

Belgian footballer

Personal information
- Date of birth: 5 December 1954 (age 71)

International career
Years	Team	Apps	(Gls)
1977	Belgium	1	(0)

Hubert Cordiez (born 5 December 1954) is a Belgian footballer. He played in one match for the Belgium national football team in 1977.
