= Frank Hougaard =

Danish footballer (born 1963)

Personal information
- Date of birth: December 29, 1963 (age 62)
- Place of birth: Denmark
- Position: Defender

Senior career*
Years	Team	Apps	(Gls)
1986–2005	Næstved IF/Næstved Boldklub	507	(?)
- * Club domestic league appearances and goals

Frank Hougaard (born 29 December 1963) is a Danish former footballer who played as a winger and fullback from 1986 to 2005.

Hougaard spent the vast majority of his professional career at Næstved Boldklub, totalling 507 league appearances, a club record. Although retiring several times, Hougaard was approached to help out his club when they faced relegation.

In his youth Hougaard played for Herlufsholm Gymnastikforening, a smaller club in Næstved. He made his league debut in the 1986 season on May 14, 1986 for Næstved IF in an away game against AGF. 19 years later he made his final appearance on June 4, 2005 at the age of 41 as Næstved Boldklub lost 3-4 against Dalum in the 2004–05 Danish 1st Division. Although previously retired, he had agreed to help out his old club facing relegation. But his efforts were not enough, and Næstved Boldklub was relegated to the Danish Second Division.

At 22 years old his debut at Næstved Boldklub came quite late, making his total appearances for the club even more impressive. During his time in Næstved Boldklub he became somewhat of a cult figure among the fans, especially due to his never-ending loyalty to the club.

Hougaard spent almost his entire career at Næstved Boldklub, with a season as playing assistant manager for Erik Rasmussen at Skælskør BI and a short period with youth club Herlufsholm Gymnastikforening as the only exceptions.

== Records ==
Hougaard has the most appearances at Næstved Boldklub, with 507 league appearances spanning 19 years. On May 23, 1993, Hougaard scored the 1000th goal in the Danish Superliga.

In his first season at Næstved Boldklub he won bronze as the club finished third in the Danish league. In 1988, he won silver medal as Næstved Boldklub finished runners-up. In 1994, he won the silver medal as Næstved Boldklub lost the Danish Cup final against Brøndby IF.
