= Holbæk B&I =

Danish football club

- Full name: Holbæk Bold- & Idrætsforening
- Short name: HB&I
- Founded: 1931
- Ground: Holbæk Sportsby, Holbæk
- Capacity: 4,000
- Chairman: Allan Markussen
- Manager: Şaban Özdoğan
- League: Danish 3rd Division
- 2025–26: Danish 3rd Division, 7th of 12
Home colours	Away colours

Holbæk Bold- & Idrætsforening is a Danish football club currently playing in Danish 3rd Division. They play at Holbæk Sportsby in Holbæk on Zealand, and have done so since 2019.

From 2008 to 2014 their first team played under the name Nordvest FC.

== History ==
The club was founded in 1931 by the merging of Holbæk Idrætsforening and Holbæk Boldklub, after a period where Holbæk Idrætsforening had some success in regional championships. The quality of the team had declined, however, since the year 1924 where some members broke out to found Holbæk Boldklub. The reason among others for that move being that cricket was still a part of the club's activities. But on 4 August 1931 the two clubs in the rather small town decided to become one – leaving cricket on the side line.

After a long period of mediocrity the club began to rise in the 1960s, where the best team was promoted several times and ended up the Danish premier division in 1974. The 1970s turned out to be the best decade for the club ever, in which the team was the runner-up in the league once going to the cup final twice; without winning. In spite of the fact that the club did not win a title, it gained huge local popularity and fostered a couple of players for the national team.

The 1980s and 1990s however saw a steady decline for the club and in 1993 it was to be found in what was then the 6th best league in the country. From there on, things started to improve and the club won some promotions during the next decade. It was for the last few seasons among the top teams in the third best league, but in the 2007–2008 season this run came to an abrupt end with a disastrous season ending in relegation from the 2nd division. On 1 July 2008, the club – in an attempt to attract better sponsors and achieve a higher degree of professionalism, was divided in a semi-professional wing called Nordvest FC and the amateur side retaining the Holbæk B&I name.

Following economic difficulties in the 2013–14 season the professional structure, Nordvest FC, was dissolved and the first team of the club in the Danish 2nd Division East went back to the name Holbæk B&I.

== Players ==
=== Current squad ===
As of 14 September 2026

Note: Flags indicate national team as defined under FIFA eligibility rules; some limited exceptions apply. Players may hold more than one non-FIFA nationality.

No.	Pos.	Nation	Player
1	GK	DEN	Sebastian Olsen
2	DF	DEN	Nicki Bentsen
4	MF	DEN	Julius Hamburger-Toft
5	MF	DEN	Mark Garly
6	MF	DEN	Tobias Pedersen
7	MF	DEN	Karim El Haddouchi
8	DF	DEN	Malte Sjørslev
9	FW	DEN	Miron Zuberovski
10	FW	DEN	Matin Al-Atlassi
12	FW	DEN	Snorre Espersen
13	MF	DEN	Frederik Due
15	DF	GRL	Adam Ejler
16	DF	DEN	Albert Høy

No.	Pos.	Nation	Player
17	DF	DEN	Rasmus Steuch
18	DF	DEN	Mikkel Vestergård
19	FW	DEN	Josef Moussa
20	GK	DEN	Elias Gottschalk
21	MF	DEN	Jonatan Knaack
22	DF	DEN	Hüseyin Tümtürk
23	MF	DEN	Mads Emil Petersen
24	MF	DEN	Mads Middelboe-Budde
26	FW	DEN	Thiery Kataronge
27	FW	DEN	Frederik Grünwaldt
29	FW	DEN	August Andersen
30	FW	DEN	Marcus Skovgaard
42	MF	TUR	Mehmet Coşkun

== Honours ==
- **Danish Championship**
  - Runners-up (1): 1975
- **Danish Cup**
  - Runners-up (2): 1974–75, 1975–76
- **Zealand Series**
  - Winner (3): 1936–37, 1974^{‡}, 1998^{‡}
  - Runners-up (3): 1947–48, 1961, 1995

^{‡}: Won by reserve team

== Achievements ==
- **4** seasons in the Highest Danish League
- **10** seasons in the Second Highest Danish League
- **24** seasons in the Third Highest Danish League

== Notable players ==
Holbæk B&I have had 5 players selected for the Danish national team: Torben Hansen, Allan Hansen, Jørgen Jørgensen, Niels Tune-Hansen, and Benno Larsen. All of them played for the club in its 1970s heyday. Later on, the club has been the breeding ground for Kurt Jørgensen and Christian Poulsen, who also played for the national team. The latter has, in the first decade of the 2000s (decade), become the most successful former Holbæk player ever, with his transfers to F.C. Copenhagen, Schalke 04 in Germany, Sevilla in 2006, Juventus in 2008 and Liverpool in 2010.
