= Køge Boldklub =

Danish football club

Køge BK
- Full name: Køge Boldklub A/S
- Founded: 1927
- Ground: Køge Stadion, Køge
- Capacity: 10,000
- Chairman: Chris Hvid Hansen
- Manager: Jimmy Kastrup
Home colours	Away colours

Køge Boldklub is a Danish football club from Køge, Zealand.

== History ==
In 1954, the club became the first outside Copenhagen to win the Danish Championship.

The club declared bankruptcy in February 2009, but continued as an amateur side in the Sjællandsserie.

In March 2009, the first team merged with Herfølge, to form HB Køge.

== Notable former players ==
see also Category:Køge Boldklub players

== Managers ==
- (Austria) Eduard Veroik (1935–1936)
- (Austria) Paul Baumgarten (1937–1941)
- (Denmark) Fritz Molnar (1941–1942)
- (Denmark) Sofus Johansen (1942–1945)
- (England) Alf Young (1945–1947)
- (Austria) Paul Baumgarten (1947–1948)
- (Denmark) Frank Petersen (1948–1950)
- (Denmark) Vestervig Madsen (1950–1952)
- (Hungary) Lajos Szendrődi (1952–1955)
- (Hungary) János Nagy (1955–1956)
- (England) Alf Young (1956–1957)
- (Denmark) Karl Aage Hansen (1957–1958)
- (Denmark) Egon Sørensen (1958–1960)
- (Denmark) Edvin Hansen & (Denmark) Willy Koch (1960–1962)
- (Hungary) Joszef Szentgyörgyi (1962)
- (Denmark) Edvin Hansen (1962–1963)
- (Italy) Mario Astorri (1963–1965)
- (Lebanon) Barkev Chekerdemian (1965–1967)
- (Denmark) Svend Hugger (1968)
- (Denmark) Kaj Pilmark (1969)
- (Denmark) Willy Schøne (1970–1973)
- (Denmark) Edvin Hansen (1974–1977)
- (Denmark) Kresten Bjerre (1978–1979)
- (Denmark) Leif Sørensen (1980–1982)
- (Denmark) Jan B. Poulsen (1983–1986)
- (Denmark) Peter Poulsen (1987–1988)
- (Denmark) Heinz Hildebrandt (1988–1990)
- (Denmark) Jan Jakobsen (1990–1991)
- (Denmark) Eigil Hansen (1991)
- (Denmark) Leif Sørensen (1991–1992)
- (Denmark) Hardy Gynild (1992)
- (Denmark) Erik Rasmussen (1993–1997)
- (Denmark) Benny Johansen (1997–1999)
- (Denmark) Henrik Jensen (1999–2003)
- (Denmark) John 'Tune' Kristiansen (2003–2004)
- (England) Gregor Rioch (2004–2006)
- (Denmark) Henrik Larsen (2006–2008)
- (Denmark) Jimmy Kastrup (2008–2009)

== Honours ==
- Danish Cup:
  - Runners-up (2): 1962–63, 1978–79

== Achievements ==
- Danish championship titles: 1954, 1975
- 34 seasons in the Highest Danish League
- 25 seasons in the Second Highest Danish League
- 6 seasons in the Third Highest Danish League
