= RWD Molenbeek (1909) =

R.W.D. Molenbeek
- Full name: Racing White Daring Molenbeek
- Nickname: Les Coalisés
- Founded: 1909 (as White Star (Athletic) Club d'Ixelles); 1973 (merging)
- Dissolved: 2002
- Ground: Edmond Machtens Stadium
- Capacity: 12,266
- Website: www.rwdm.be
Home colours	Away colours

R.W.D. Molenbeek, short for Racing White Daring Molenbeek, was a Belgian football club founded in 1909 as White Star Club de Bruxelles. It then became a member of the Belgian Football Association later the same year as White Star Athletic Club and received the registration number 47.

== History ==
=== White Star A.C. ===
The club played several seasons in the first division (1924–25 and from 1934–35 to 1946–47) first as White Star Woluwé A.C. then as Royal White Star A.C. The later White Star Woluwé F.C. took its name from this team but is not otherwise related.

=== Racing White ===
In 1963 the club merged with Racing de Bruxelles to become Royal Racing White. It played in the first division from 1965 until 1973 after two seasons in the second division. Its home ground was the Stade Fallon in Woluwe-Saint-Lambert, Brussels till the club merged with the famous Daring Club de Bruxelles in July 1973, becoming R.W.D. Molenbeek. The main reason for that merger was the poor league attendance.

=== R.W.D. Molenbeek ===
The club played in the first division for ten seasons after its inception, winning the 1974–75 Belgian First Division, regularly qualifying for European competitions and even reaching the semi-final of the 1976–77 UEFA Cup. Since the club had kept the registration number 47 of R. Racing White it could begin in the first division but it had lost the honours of the Daring Club. The club played in Molenbeek-Saint-Jean, Brussels.

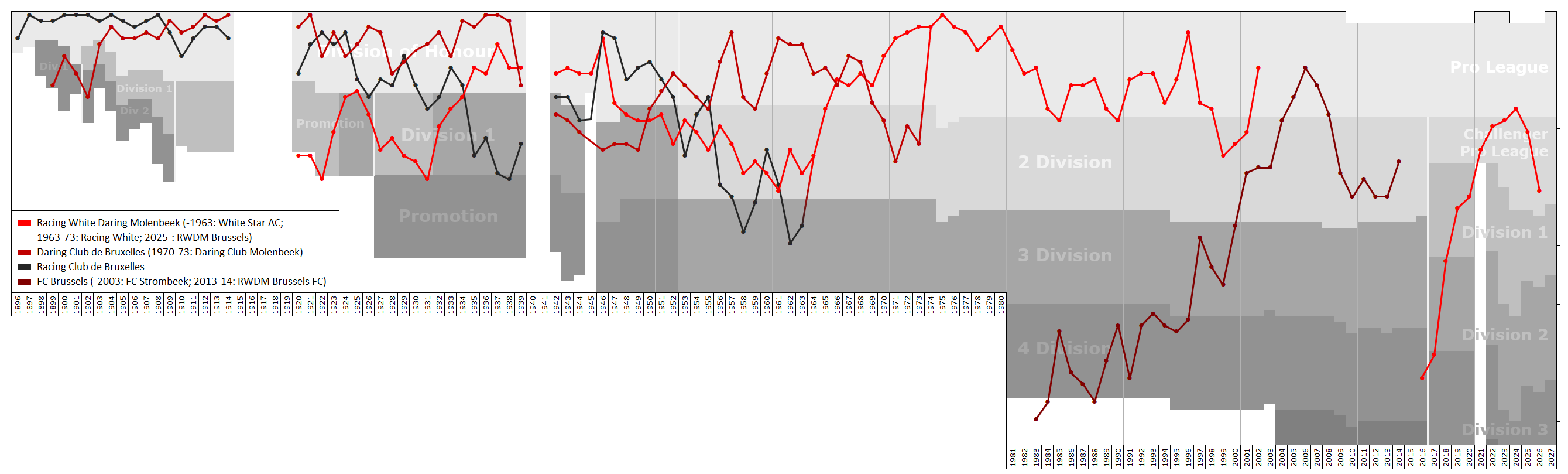
Historical league performance chart of RWD Molenbeek and its predecessors

From 1984, the club encountered many difficulties, leading to bankruptcy in 2002.

During the 2002–03 season, K.F.C. Strombeek (located near Brussels) moved to the Edmond Machtens Stadium and became F.C. Molenbeek Brussels Strombeek the next season. The new club, which used Strombeek's matricule (registration) №1936, subsequently began in the second division but was promoted to the Belgian First Division in 2004.

At the same time, a group of fans, who fought to keep the name alive, had also recreated a new team called RWD Molenbeek (with a new registration number) in 2003. The new team started at the very bottom of the Belgian football league system - provincial division 4 in Brabant (level 8), but has been promoted to the Brabant provincial division 1 (level 5 in Belgium) in 2006 after absorbing another team from the Brabant province. In 2015, the matricule of Standaard Wetteren was sold to a group of investors who started the club RWDM47, trying to reinstate the history of the club.

== European Cup history ==
Season	Competition	Round	Club	Home	Away	Aggregate
1972–73	UEFA Cup	1R	(Portugal) CUF Barreiro	0–1	0–2	0–3
1973–74	UEFA Cup	1R	(Francoist Spain) Espanyol	1–2	3–0	4–2
1973–74	UEFA Cup	2R	(Portugal) Vitória Setúbal	2–1	0–1	2–2 (a)
1974–75	UEFA Cup	1R	(Scotland) Dundee	1–0	4–2	5–2
1974–75	UEFA Cup	2R	(Netherlands) Twente	0–1	1–2	1–3
1975–76	European Cup	1R	(Norway) Viking	3–2	1–0	4–2
1975–76	European Cup	R16	(Socialist Federal Republic of Yugoslavia) Hajduk Split	2–3	0–4	2–7
1976–77	UEFA Cup	1R	(Denmark) Næstved	4–0	3–0	7–0
1976–77	UEFA Cup	2R	(Poland) Wisła Kraków	1–1	1–1	2–2 (5–4 p)
1976–77	UEFA Cup	3R	(West Germany) Schalke 04	1–0	1–1	2–1
1976–77	UEFA Cup	QF	(Netherlands) Feyenoord	2–1	0–0	2–1
1976–77	UEFA Cup	SF	(Francoist Spain) Athletic Bilbao	1–1	0–0	1–1 (a)
1977–78	UEFA Cup	1R	(Scotland) Aberdeen	0–0	2–1	2–1
1977–78	UEFA Cup	2R	(East Germany) Carl Zeiss Jena	1–1	1–1	2–2 (5–6 p)
1980–81	UEFA Cup	1R	(Italy) Torino	1–2	2–2 (aet)	3–4
1996–97	UEFA Cup	1R	(Turkey) Beşiktaş	0–0	0–3	0–3

== Honours ==
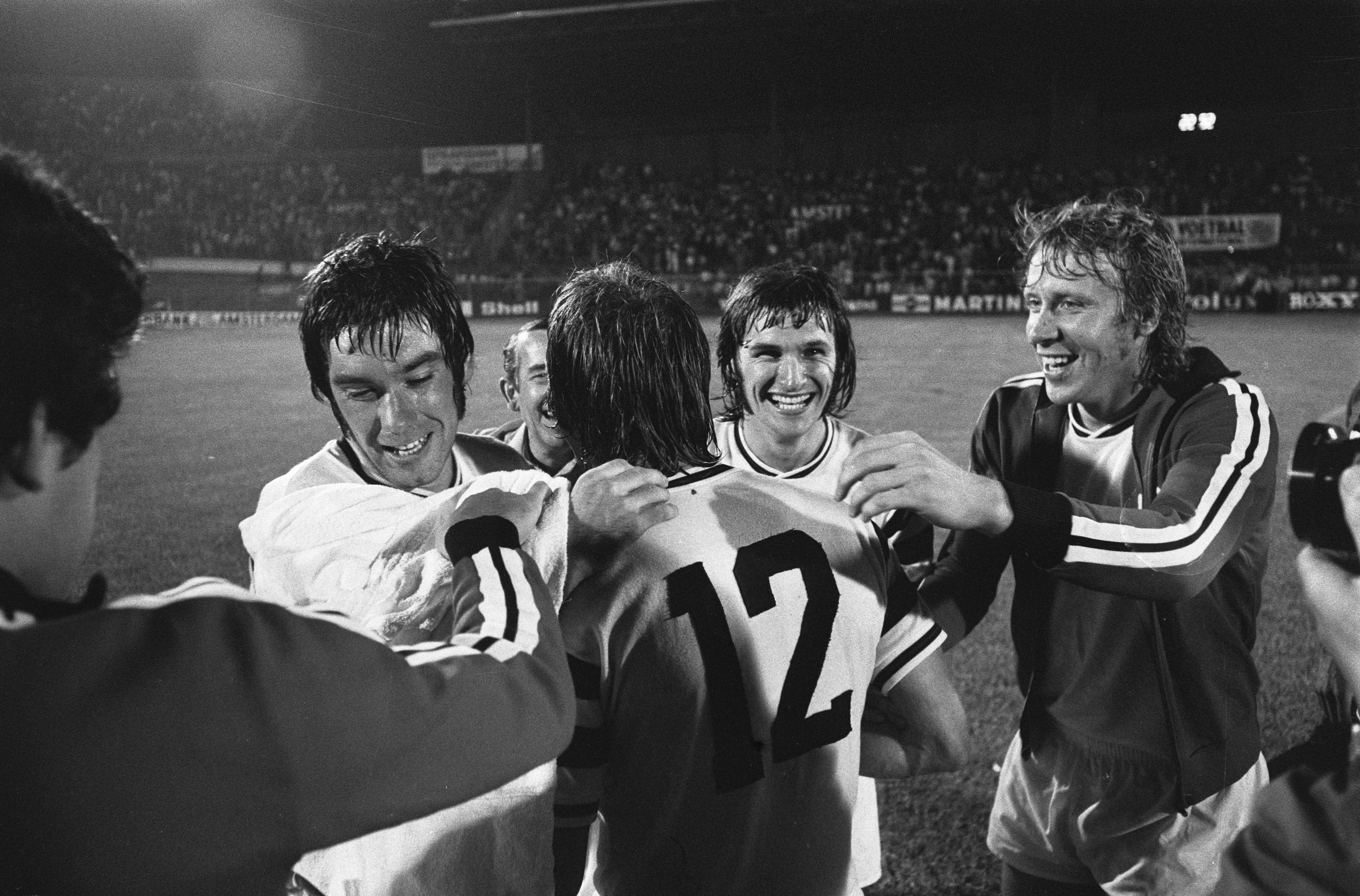
Molenbeek players celebrate after winning the 1975 Amsterdam tournament final against Ajax

- Belgian First Division:
  - Winners: 1974–75
- Belgian Second Division:
  - Winners: 1923–24, 1933–34, 1964–65, 1984–85, 1989–90
- Belgian Second Division final round:
  - Winners: 2001
- Belgian Cup:
  - Runners-up: 1968–69
- Amsterdam Tournament:
  - Winners: 1975
- Jules Pappaert Cup:
  - Winners: 1975
