= Crack epidemic in the United States =

Drug epidemic in the 1980s and 1990s

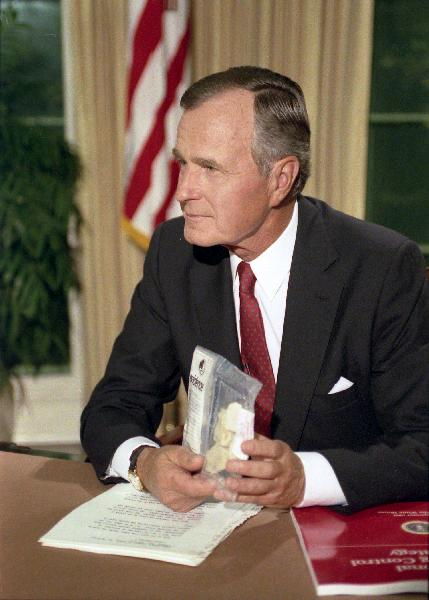
President George H. W. Bush holds up a bag of crack cocaine during an Address to the Nation on National Drug Control Strategy on September 5, 1989.

The crack epidemic was a surge of crack cocaine use in major cities across the United States throughout the entirety of the 1980s and the early 1990s. This resulted in several social consequences, such as increasing crime and violence in American inner city neighborhoods, a resulting backlash in the form of tough on crime policies, and a massive spike in incarceration rates.

== Crack and cocaine ==
In the early 1980s, cocaine, originating in Colombia and trafficked through The Bahamas, was shipped primarily to Miami for distribution throughout the United States. Increased production led to a glut of cocaine powder, which caused the street price to drop by as much as 80 percent. To protect their profits, drug dealers began turning the powder into "crack", a solid smokable form of cocaine that was easy to break into small pieces for resale. It was cheap and simple to produce, ready to use, and could be sold at an affordable price for most users. As early as 1981, police reports of crack usage and possession were appearing in Los Angeles, Oakland, Chicago, New York, Miami, Houston, and in the Caribbean.

Journalist Charles Perry published an exposé about the drug's effects in a Rolling Stone article on May 1, 1980, titled "Freebase: A Treacherous Obsession: The rise of crack cocaine and the fall of addicts destroyed by the drug". Though the word "crack" was not outright used, the article noted that freebase made its "strongest inroads" in the music industry of Los Angeles and at this time, in 1980, the similar crack form had just been starting (and in a few years would become predominant and also move to the East Coast and elsewhere). The article describes both the earlier free base method of purifying cocaine to make it smokable, which started in 1974, and the newer but similar crack making process.

=== Freebase vs crack cocaine ===
Cocaine has a chemical called hydrochloride (salt) which is basically the powdered form of cocaine. Freebase cocaine is the purest form of cocaine and to free the base, diethyl ether and volatile solvent must be used. Freebase was made by users who would combine cocaine with diethyl ether or other volatile solvents to extract the base salt (hydrochloride), "freeing it". This achieves a lower melting point (98°C) without burning and destroying the excess cocaine. When heated with a lighter, the vapors are inhaled. Diethyl ether and similar volatile solvents were highly flammable and explosive, making the process dangerous due to chemicals.

A less volatile but similar process was developed in the early 1980s; street cocaine was dissolved in a solution of water and baking soda and then dried out into "crack rocks". As the rocks are heated, it makes a crackling sound, and this is how the substance got its name. Crack and freebase cocaine in its final form is a fine white crystallized powder substance. Since freebase cocaine was so difficult to develop, the making of crack cocaine became more prioritized in the market. It was not until 1985 after an article in The New York Times describing crack use in the Bronx, New York titled "A new, purified form of cocaine causes alarm as abuse increases" that the media started reporting on the new drug - that year alone, more than a thousand articles and stories were published.

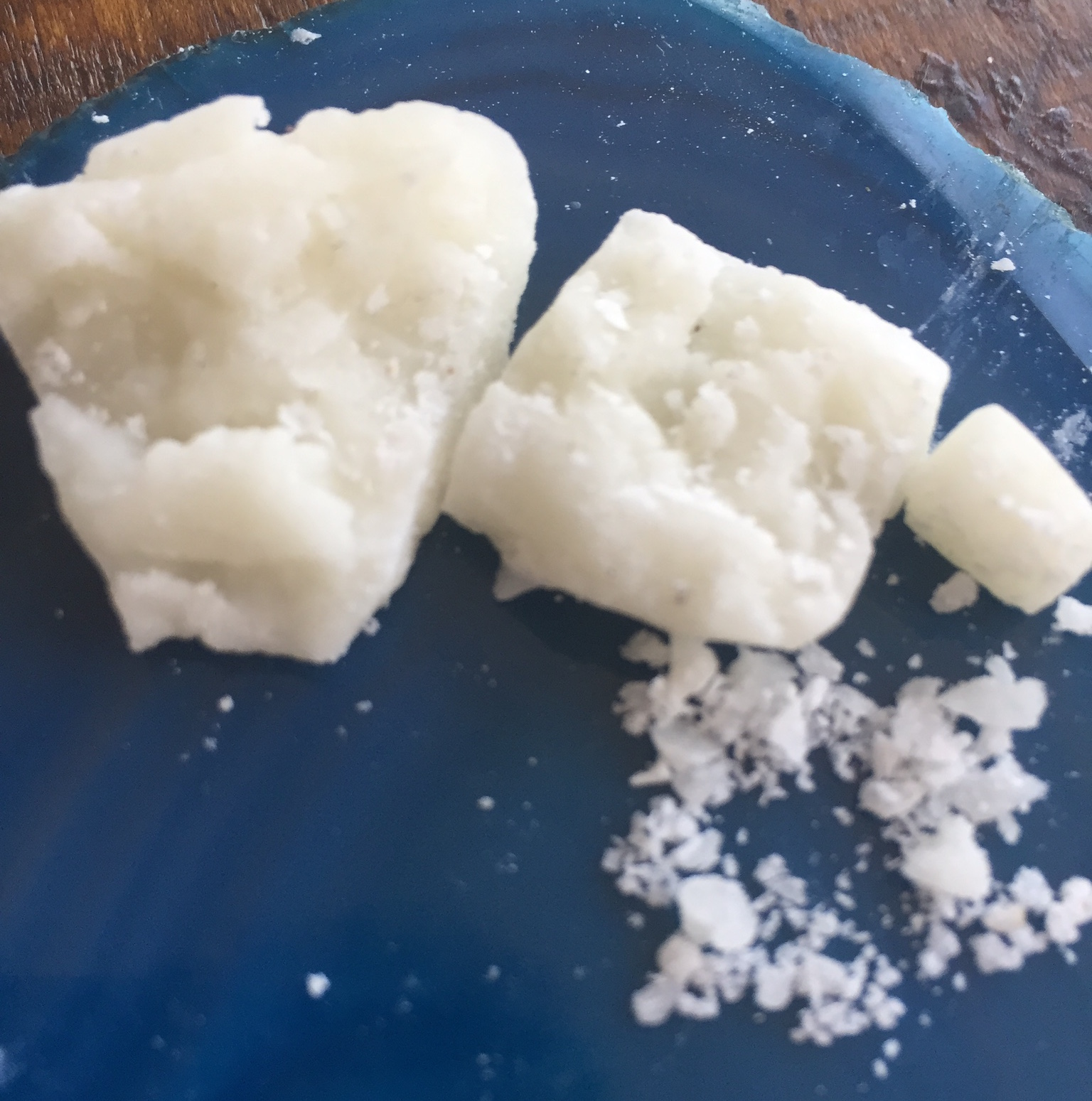
Two grams of crack cocaine

Initially, crack had a higher purity than powder. Around 1984, powder cocaine was available on the street at an average of 55 percent purity for $100 per gram (equivalent to $310 in 2025), and crack was sold at average purity levels of 80-plus percent for the same price. The crack cocaine would usually be sold in vials to be smoked. In some major cities, such as New York, Chicago, Los Angeles, San Francisco, Philadelphia, Baltimore, Houston and Detroit, one dose of crack could be obtained for as little as $2.50 (equivalent to $8 in 2025).

=== Effects of crack usage ===
Crack is a stimulant to the human body, making it an extremely addictive drug. Crack gives users a very intense pleasurable euphoric feeling. Crack cocaine enters the bloodstream far more rapidly than snorting cocaine. Smoking crack would enter the central nervous system circulation within 6 seconds to 8 seconds; compared to cocaine which would take 5 to 10 minutes. However, crack disperses much more quickly as well. A crack "high" lasts from 5 to 15 minutes at most. Once the crack high disappears, users enter the "low" state. This is often followed by insomnia, paranoia, and irritability, and can progress to a schizophrenia-like psychosis involving delusions and hallucinations. The immediate effects of crack are sweating, seizure, stroke, loss of appetite, or "coke bugs" (the feeling of bugs under the skin). The long-term effects can range from high blood pressure, tooth decay, kidney failure, liver damage, and many more damage to the vital organs. Withdrawing from crack is also very intense; users would become very nauseated, paranoid, and develop an intense craving for crack. Since crack is so addictive, it created this extremely quick addiction cycle. Once the effects wore off, users would immediately smoke crack again back-to-back all day.

According to the 1985–1986 National Narcotics Intelligence Consumers Committee Report, crack was available in Atlanta, Boston, Detroit, Kansas City, Miami, New York City, Newark, San Francisco, Seattle, St. Louis, Dallas, Denver, Minneapolis and Phoenix.

In 1985, cocaine-related hospital emergencies rose by 12 percent, from 23,500 to 26,300. In 1986, these incidents increased 110 percent, from 26,300 to 55,200. Between 1984 and 1987, cocaine incidents increased to 94,000. By 1987, crack was reported to be available in the District of Columbia and all but four states in the United States.

Some scholars have cited the crack "epidemic" as an example of a moral panic, noting that the explosion in use and trafficking of the drug actually occurred after the media coverage of the drug as an "epidemic".

== Impact by region ==
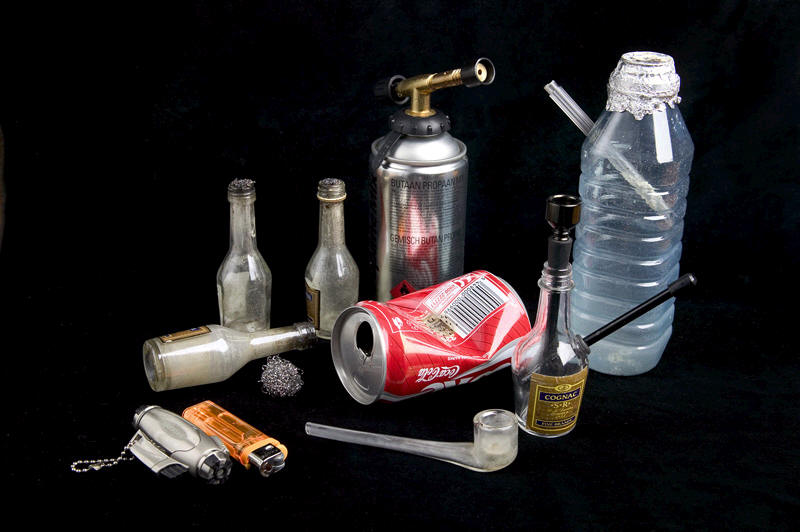
Various paraphernalia used to smoke crack cocaine, including a homemade crack pipe made out of an empty plastic water bottle

In a study done by Roland Fryer, Steven Levitt, and Kevin Murphy, a crack index was calculated using information on cocaine-related arrests, deaths, and drug raids, along with low birth rates and media coverage in the United States. The crack index aimed to create a proxy for the percentage of cocaine related incidents that involved crack. Crack was an almost unknown drug until 1985. This abrupt introductory date allows for the estimation and use of the index with the knowledge that values prior to 1985 are essentially zero. This index showed that the Northeast U.S. was most affected by the crack epidemic. The U.S. cities with the highest crack index were New York, Newark and Philadelphia. Miami (especially the city's Liberty City neighborhood) had the highest crack index in the country for over a decade.

The same index used by Fryer, Levitt and Murphy was then implemented in a study that investigated the effects of crack cocaine across the United States. In cities with populations over 350,000 the instances of crack cocaine were twice as high as those in cities with a population less than 350,000. These indicators show that the use of crack cocaine was much higher in urban areas.

Maryland, Florida, New York and New Mexico had the highest instances of crack cocaine use, while Idaho, Minnesota and Vermont had the lowest instances of crack cocaine use.

== Effect on African American communities ==
Number of incarcerated Americans in the U.S. prison system, divided by race, 1978-2022

African American families made up the largest demographic in low-income inner city neighborhoods. This led to crack impacting African American communities far more than others.

=== Leading up to the crack epidemic ===
Leading up to the crack epidemic, the economy shifted. Consumer goods started to become produced overseas due to lower wage rates and modern equipment. Over half a million manufacturing jobs plus 100,000 jobs in wholesale and retail trades were lost between 1967 and 1987. Unskilled or semi-skilled labor started to decrease in the inner cities. In Boston, Newark, New York, Philadelphia, and Pittsburgh out-of-school Black males, 16 to 24, who were not working increased from 19% to over 50% in 1968-1970. This shift left families and individuals struggling to make ends meet.

=== During the epidemic ===
Between 1984 and 1989, the homicide rate for black males aged 14 to 17 more than doubled, and the homicide rate for black males aged 18 to 24 increased nearly as much. During this period, the black community also experienced a 20–100% increase in fetal death rates, low birth-weight babies, weapons arrests, and the number of children in foster care.

A 2018 study found that the crack epidemic had long term consequences for crime, contributing to the doubling of the murder rate of young black males soon after the start of the epidemic, and that the murder rate was still 70 percent higher seventeen years after crack's arrival. The paper estimated that 8% of reported murders in 2000 were due to the long-run effects of the emergence of crack markets, and that the elevated murder rates for young black males can explain a significant part of the gap in life expectancy between black and white males.

Crack cocaine use and distribution became popular in cities that were in a state of social and economic chaos such as Miami, New York, Los Angeles and Atlanta, and particularly in their impoverished inner city neighborhoods, where drug dealing was an easy means of earning income. "As a result of the low-skill levels and minimal initial resource outlay required to sell crack, systemic violence flourished as a growing army of young, enthusiastic inner-city crack sellers attempt to defend their economic investment."

== Sentencing disparities ==
Timeline of total number of inmates in U.S. prisons, jails, and juvenile facilities from 1920 to 2014. A major spike in incarcerations occurred between 1980 and 2000.

In 1986, the U.S. Congress passed laws that created a 100 to 1 sentencing disparity for the possession or trafficking of crack when compared to penalties for powder cocaine, widely criticized as discriminatory against African-Americans and other racial minorities, who were more likely to use crack than powder cocaine. This 100:1 ratio was mandated by federal law in 1986. Persons convicted in federal court of possession of 5 grams of crack cocaine received a minimum mandatory sentence of 5 years in federal prison. On the other hand, possession of 500 grams of powder cocaine carries the same sentence. In 2010, the Fair Sentencing Act cut the sentencing disparity to 18:1.

In 2012, 88% of imprisonments from crack cocaine were African American. Further, the data show the discrepancy between lengths of sentences of crack cocaine and heroin. The majority of crack imprisonments are placed in the 10–20 year range, while the imprisonments related to heroin use or possession range from 5–10 years.

== Post-epidemic commentary ==
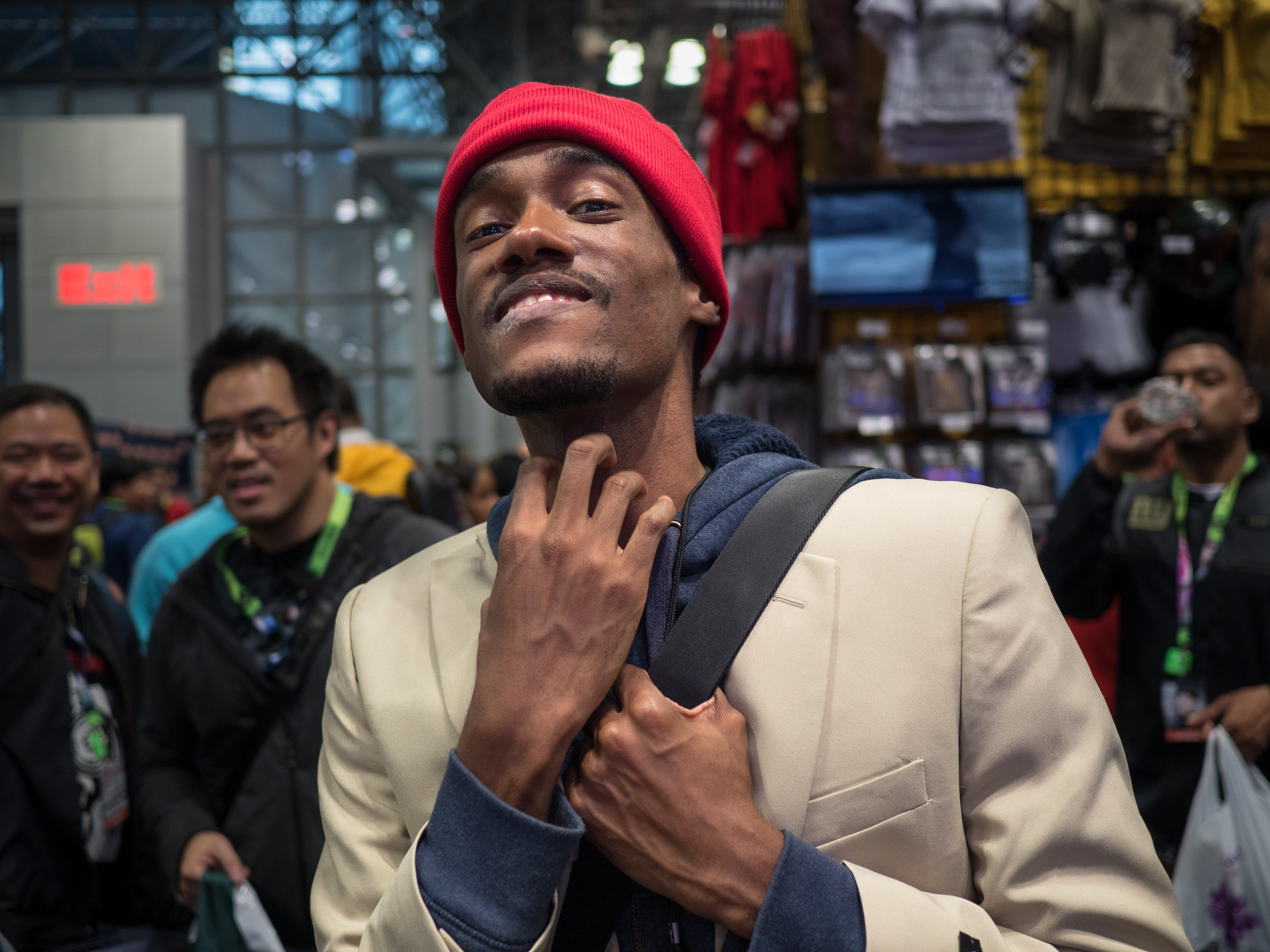
A man at New York Comic Con cosplaying as Tyrone Biggums, a character in the American sketch comedy series Chappelle's Show. Tyrone's character comedically represents an African-American man who became downtrodden and afflicted by the effects of crack.

A number of authors have discussed race and the crack epidemic, including Memphis writer Demico Boothe, who spent 12 years in federal prison after being arrested for the first-time offense of selling crack cocaine at the age of 18, published the book, Why Are So Many Black Men in Prison? in 2007.

Writer and lawyer Michelle Alexander's book The New Jim Crow: Mass Incarceration in the Age of Colorblindness (2010) argues that punitive laws against drugs like crack cocaine adopted under the Reagan administration's war on drugs resulted in harsh social consequences, including large numbers of young Black men imprisoned for long sentences, the exacerbation of drug crime despite a decrease in illegal drug use in the United States, and increased police brutality against the Black community resulting in injury and death.

According to Alexander, society turned to racist criminal justice policies to avoid exhibiting obvious racism. She writes that, since African Americans were the majority users of crack cocaine, it provided a platform for the government to create laws that were specific to crack. She claims that this was an effective way to imprison Black people without having to do the same to white Americans. Alexander writes that felony drug convictions for crack cocaine fell disproportionately on young Black men, who then lost access to voting, housing, and employment opportunities, which then led to increased violent crime in poor Black communities.

Legal Scholar James Forman Jr. argues that though Alexander's book has value in focusing scholars (and society as a whole) on the failures of the criminal justice system, it obscures African-American support for tougher crime laws and downplays the role of violent crime in the story of incarceration.

John Pfaff, in his book Locked In: The True Causes of Mass Incarceration and How to Achieve Real Reform, criticizes Alexander's assertion that the Drug War, including sentencing disparities for crack, is responsible for mass incarceration. Among his findings are that drug offenders make up only a small part of the prison population, and non-violent drug offenders an even smaller portion; that people convicted of violent crimes make up the majority of prisoners; that county and state justice systems account for the large majority of American prisoners and not the federal system that handles most drug cases; and, subsequently, "national" statistics tell a distorted story when differences in enforcement, conviction, and sentencing are widely disparate between states and counties.

=== Dark Alliance series ===
San Jose Mercury News journalist Gary Webb sparked national controversy with his 1996 Dark Alliance series which alleged that Nicaraguan dealers with Contra ties started and significantly fueled the 1980s crack epidemic. Investigating the lives and connections of Los Angeles crack dealers Ricky Ross, Oscar Danilo Blandón, and Norwin Meneses, Webb alleged that profits from these crack sales were funneled to the CIA-supported Contras.

The United States Department of Justice Office of the Inspector General rejected Webb's claim that there was a "systematic effort by the CIA to protect the drug trafficking activities of the Contras". The DOJ/OIG reported: "We found that Blandon and Meneses were plainly major drug traffickers who enriched themselves at the expense of countless drug users and the communities in which these drug users lived, just like other drug dealers of their magnitude. They also contributed some money to the Contra cause. But we did not find that their activities were the cause of the crack epidemic in Los Angeles, much less in the United States as a whole, or that they were a significant source of support for the Contras."

== In popular culture ==
=== Documentary films ===
- Crack USA: County Under Siege (1989)
- High on Crack Street: Lost Lives in Lowell (1995)
- Cocaine Cowboys (2006)
- Crackheads Gone Wild (2006)
- American Drug War: The Last White Hope (2007)
- Cocaine Cowboys 2 (2008)
- Freakonomics (2010)
- Planet Rock: The Story of Hip-Hop and the Crack Generation (2011)
- The Seven Five (2014)
- Freeway: Crack in the System (2015)
- 13th (2016)
- Crack: Cocaine, Corruption & Conspiracy (2021)

=== Documentary serials ===
- Drugs, Inc. (2010–present)

=== Films ===
- Death Wish 4: The Crackdown (1987)
- Colors (1988)
- King of New York (1990)
- Boyz n the Hood (1991)
- Jungle Fever (1991)
- New Jack City (1991)
- Bad Lieutenant (1992)
- Deep Cover (1992)
- Menace II Society (1993)
- Above the Rim (1994)
- Fresh (1994)
- Clockers (1995)
- Belly (1998)
- Streetwise (1998)
- Training Day (2001)
- Paid in Full (2002)
- Shottas (2002)
- Dark Blue (2002)
- Get Rich or Die Tryin' (2005)
- Notorious (2009)
- Life Is Hot in Cracktown (2009)
- The Fighter (2010)
- Kill the Messenger (2014)
- Moonlight (2016)
- White Boy Rick (2018)

=== Music ===
- "Night of the Living Baseheads" Public Enemy (1988)
- "Crack Rock" ("Yo' Mama's on Crack Rock!")", The Dogs, (1990).
- "I Heart Crack" Rucka Rucka Ali (2006)
- "Good Kids Smoke Crack" Rucka Rucka Ali (2008)

=== Television ===
- Miami Vice (1984–1989)
- Chappelle's Show (2003–2006)
- The Wire (2002–2008)
- Snowfall (2017–2023)
- Cocaine Godmother (2018)
- Narcos: Mexico (2018–2021)
- Wu-Tang: An American Saga (2019)
- Godfather of Harlem (2019–present)
- BMF (2021-2025)

=== Video games ===
- Narc (1988)
- Grand Theft Auto: Vice City (2002)
- Grand Theft Auto: San Andreas (2004)
- True Crime: New York City (2005)
- Grand Theft Auto: Vice City Stories (2006)
- Scarface: Money. Power. Respect. (2006)
- Scarface: The World Is Yours (2006)
- Grand Theft Auto IV (2008)
- Grand Theft Auto: Chinatown Wars (2009)
- Hotline Miami (2012)

=== Books ===
- Sudhir Venkatesh (Indian American sociologist scholar and reporter)
  - Freakonomics (2005) – Chapter: "Why Do Drug Dealers Still Live With Their Moms"
  - American Project. The Rise and Fall of a Modern Ghetto, Harvard University Press, 2000
  - Off the Books. The Underground Economy of the Urban Poor, Harvard University Press, 2006
  - Gang Leader for a Day: A Rogue Sociologist Takes to the Streets, Penguin Press, 2008
  - Floating City: A Rogue Sociologist Lost and Found in New York's Underground Economy, Penguin Press, 2013
- Donovan X. Ramsey (2023). When Crack Was King: A People's History of a Misunderstood Era. One World. ISBN 978-0525511809.

== See also ==
- Cocaine in the United States
- Opioid epidemic
- Post–civil rights era in African-American history
