= Pfaff (surname) =

Pfaff is a surname. Notable people with the surname include:

- Alfred Pfaff, German football player
- Anita Bose Pfaff, economist
- Brad Pfaff, American politician
- Chris Pfaff, American television actor
- Debby Pfaff, reality show personality
- Dieter Pfaff (1947–2013), German actor
- Eva Pfaff, German tennis player
- Ferenc Pfaff, Hungarian architect
- Georg Michael Pfaff, German manufacturer of sewing machines
- Jean-Marie Pfaff, Belgian football player
- Johann Friedrich Pfaff, German mathematician
  - Concepts named after him include the Pfaffian, Pfaffian functions, and the Pfaff problem
  - 29491 Pfaff, a main-belt asteroid named in his honour
- John Pfaff, American legal scholar
- Judy Pfaff, artist
- Kristen Pfaff, American musician
- Lyndsey Pfaff, reality show personality
- Michael Pfaff, American musician
- Petra Pfaff, East German hurdler
- Richard William Pfaff, American historian of the liturgy
- William Pfaff, American author

== Other uses ==
- Pfaff, a sewing machine manufacturer
- Pfaff Motorsports, a Canadian auto racing team
- Pfaff v. Wells Electronics, Inc. US Supreme Court case involving inventor Wayne K. Pfaff
- H. & J. Pfaff Brewing Company

== See also ==
- faff
- faffing
