= Dorothy Brown =

Dorothy Brown may refer to:

- Dorothy Lavinia Brown (1919–2004), African American surgeon, legislator, and teacher
- Dorothy A. Brown (politician) (born 1953), American lawyer and politician
- Dorothy A. Brown (law professor) (born 1960), American law professor and tax reform advocate
- Diorbhail Nic a' Bhriuthainn (died 1644), Scottish Gaelic poet and songwriter
