= Crack: Cocaine, Corruption & Conspiracy =

- Promotional poster
- Directed by: Stanley Nelson Jr.
- Produced by: Keith Brown; Cameo George; Naimah Jabali-Nash; Nicole London; Samson Styles
- Edited by: Brittany Huckabee; Mike Long; Jeremy Phillips; Charnelle Quallis
- Production company: Odball Films
- Distributed by: Netflix
- Release date: January 11, 2021
- Running time: 89 minutes
- Country: United States
- Language: English

Crack: Cocaine, Corruption & Conspiracy is a 2021 American documentary film made for Netflix and directed by Stanley Nelson. Its story focuses on the emergence and effects of the 1980s crack epidemic in the United States, which resulted in negative effects on America's inner cities. The film was released on January 11, 2021.
