= Crackheads Gone Wild =

- Directed by: Daryl Smith
- Produced by: Daryl Smith
- Release date: 2006
- Country: United States

Crackheads Gone Wild is a 2006 documentary produced by Daryl Smith about cocaine users in Atlanta.

== Post release ==
In an interview with The Guardian newspaper, Smith said he knew some of the people he filmed over a period of years and watched them slowly deteriorate. 'Many of these people are highly intelligent. I have footage of a lady who has a master's degree in education and used to work on Capitol Hill. She got hooked on drugs and now she's homeless. The point of the movie is: do not even try crack or this is what it will reduce you to. You will not have any control over your life and you will live and die for the drug.'

Smith later produced a sequel, Scared Straight.

By June 2006, over 400,000 bootleg copies of "Crackheads Gone Wild" were estimated to have been sold, at least partly due to viewers considering the film to be a comedy.

== See also ==
- Crack epidemic
