= Michelle Alexander =

American lawyer, writer, and activist (born 1967)

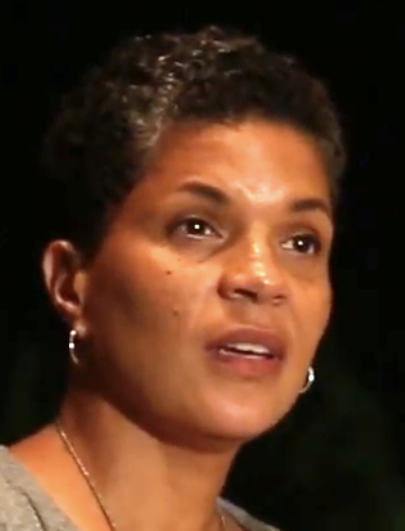
- Alexander in 2017
- Born: October 7, 1967 (age 59); Chicago, Illinois, U.S.
- Education: Vanderbilt University (BA); Stanford University (JD)
- Known for: The New Jim Crow: Mass Incarceration in the Age of Colorblindness
- Scientific career
- Fields: Race in the United States criminal justice system Racial profiling Racism in the United States
- Workplaces: Union Theological Seminary in the City of New York

Michelle Alexander (born October 7, 1967) is an American writer, attorney, and civil rights activist. She is best known for her 2010 book The New Jim Crow: Mass Incarceration in the Age of Colorblindness. Since 2018, she has been an opinion columnist for the New York Times.

== Early life ==
Alexander was born on October 7, 1967, in Chicago, Illinois, to an interracial couple, John Alexander and Sandra Alexander (née Huck) who were wed in 1965. She spent her early childhood in Stelle, Illinois, until 1977, when the family moved to the San Francisco area, where her father worked as a salesman for IBM.

Alexander attended high school in Ashland, Oregon, with her younger sister, Leslie Alexander, who later became a professor of history and African-American studies and the author of 2008's African or American? Black Identity in New York City, 1784–1861.

Alexander earned a B.A. degree from Vanderbilt University, where she received a Truman Scholarship. She earned a J.D. degree from Stanford Law School.

== Career ==
Alexander served as director of the Racial Justice Project at the American Civil Liberties Union (ACLU) of Northern California from 1998 until 2005, which led a national campaign against racial profiling by law enforcement. She directed the Civil Rights Clinic at Stanford Law School and was a law clerk for Justice Harry Blackmun at the U. S. Supreme Court and for Chief Judge Abner Mikva on the United States Court of Appeals for the D.C. Circuit. As an associate at Saperstein, Goldstein, Demchak & Baller, she specialized in plaintiff-side class action suits alleging race and gender discrimination.

Alexander was a visiting professor at Union Theological Seminary in the City of New York from 2016 to 2021.

In 2018, she was hired as an opinion columnist at The New York Times. There she collaborated on a piece with Leslie Alexander entitled "Fear" which became a chapter in Nikole Hannah-Jones's "The 1619 Project."

=== The New Jim Crow ===
Alexander published her book The New Jim Crow: Mass Incarceration in the Age of Colorblindness in 2010. In it, she argued that systemic racial discrimination in the United States resumed following the Civil Rights Movement, and that the resumption is embedded in the US war on drugs and other governmental policies and is having devastating social consequences. She considered the scope and impact of this to be comparable with that of the Jim Crow laws of the 19th and 20th centuries. Her book concentrates on the high rate of incarceration of African-American men for various crimes. Alexander writes: "Race plays a major role—indeed, a defining role—in the current system, but not because of what is commonly understood as old-fashioned, hostile bigotry. This system of control depends far more on racial indifference (defined as a lack of compassion and caring about race and racial groups) than racial hostility—a feature it actually shares with its predecessors." The New Jim Crow describes how oppressed minorities are "subject to legalized discrimination in employment, housing, public benefits, and jury service, just as their parents, grandparents, and great-grandparents once were."

The New Jim Crow was re-released in paperback in 2012. As of March 2012 it had been on the New York Times Best Seller list for six weeks and it reached number 1 on the Washington Post bestseller list in 2012. The book has been the subject of scholarly debate and criticism.

In the fall of 2015, all freshmen enrolled at Brown University read The New Jim Crow as part of the campus's First Readings Program initiated by the office of the dean of the college and voted on by the faculty.

Yale University clinical law professor James Forman Jr., while acknowledging the validity of the Jim Crow analogy, has argued that Alexander overstates her case for decarceration and leaves out important ways in which the newer system of mass incarceration is different. He asserts that her framework overemphasizes the war on drugs and ignores violent crimes, arguing that Alexander's analysis is demographically simplistic.

Alexander refers to electronic ankle monitoring practices as the "Newest Jim Crow," increasingly segregating people of color under bail reform laws that "look good on paper" but are based on a presumption of guilt and replace bail with shackles as pre-trial detainees consent to electronic monitoring in order to be released from jail.

=== Appearances ===
Alexander appeared in the 2012 documentary Hidden Colors 2: The Triumph of Melanin, in which she discusses the impact of mass incarceration on Black communities.

Alexander also appeared in the 2016 documentary 13th, directed by Ava DuVernay. As an interviewee, Alexander describes the evolution of racial inequality in the United States from slavery and the Jim Crow laws to the war on drugs and mass incarceration. Alexander says: "So many aspects of the Old Jim Crow are suddenly legal again once you've been branded a felon."

== Personal life ==
In 2002, Alexander married attorney Carter M. Stewart. Stewart at the time was a senior associate at McCutchen, Doyle, Brown & Enersen, a San Francisco law firm, and later was the U.S. Attorney for the Southern District of Ohio. They have three children. Her father-in-law is a former member of the board of directors of The New York Times.

In a 2019 opinion piece for the New York Times, written subsequent to the passing of the Ohio "Heartbeat Bill", Alexander wrote of being raped during her first semester of law school, becoming pregnant as a result, and then aborting the pregnancy.

== Awards ==
- 2005: Soros Justice Fellowship from the Open Society Institute
- 2016: Heinz Award in Public Policy
- 2017: MLK Dreamer Award from the Ohio State University's Frank W. Hale Jr. Black Cultural Center

== See also ==
- Joe Biden Supreme Court candidates
- List of law clerks for the second seat of the Supreme Court of the United States
