= De Pfaffs =

- Series title screen
- Genre: Reality show
- Country of origin: Belgium
- Original language: Dutch
- No. of seasons: 11
- No. of episodes: 227

Original release
- Network: VTM
- Release: 6 September 2002 – 2011

De Pfaffs was a Flemish reality show revolving around the family of former football goalkeeper Jean-Marie Pfaff. It was broadcast from 2002 until 2011 on Flemish TV channel VTM and later exported to the Netherlands too, where the first season was shown by the AVRO and the rest by RTL 4 and RTL 7.

The show starred Jean-Marie, his wife Carmen and her father Edilberth, nicknamed "Bompa" (who died in 2007), alongside Jean-Marie's daughters Debby, Kelly and Lyndsey and their respective husbands and children.

== Lyndsey Pfaff ==
Lyndsey Pfaff
- Born: 4 October 1978 (age 47); Beveren-Waas, Belgium
- Other name: Lyndsey Linda Marc
- Spouse: Dave Volders
- Children: Bruce, Fay
- Parent(s): Jean-Marie Pfaff, Carmen Seth
- Relatives: Kelly Pfaff (sister), Debby Pfaff (sister)

Lyndsey Linda Marc Pfaff (born 4 October 1978 in Beveren-Waas) is a Belgian TV-personality.

She is the youngest daughter of former football goalkeeper Jean-Marie Pfaff and Carmen Seth. Her older sisters are Debby and Kelly. She went to the hotel school VTI Spijker and got her degree in hotel management. After college she worked in the tourism industry. A while later she worked for a production company called TV Company. Together with her sister Kelly, she hosted a 'lifestyle' show. She also worked as an editor for the Belgian magazine Flair. The Pfaff-family have their own reality show De Pfaffs on TV.

In 2004, Lyndsey married Dave Volders and they have two children, Bruce (born 20 July 2006) and Fay (born 10 September 2007). Shortly after her marriage, in 2005, she was seen in an episode of the Belgian version of Fear Factor.

== Debby Pfaff ==
Debby Pfaff
- Born: 30 May 1975 (age 50); Beveren-Waas, Belgium
- Other name: Debby Edilbert Gerdina
- Spouse: Nicolas Liébaert
- Children: Keano, Liam
- Parent(s): Jean-Marie Pfaff, Carmen Seth
- Relatives: Kelly Pfaff (sister), Lyndsey Pfaff (sister)

Debby Edilbert Gerdina Pfaff (born 30 May 1975 in Beveren-Waas) is a Belgian TV-personality.

She is the oldest daughter of former football goalkeeper Jean-Marie Pfaff and Carmen Seth. She has two younger sisters, called Kelly and Lyndsey. The Pfaff-family have a reality show, De Pfaffs. Debby has a relationship with Nicolas Liébaert and they have two sons, Keano (born 4 November 2004) and Liam (born 27 May 2006).

== In other media ==
Between 2003 and 2004 two comic book albums were produced around the TV series. The stories were written by Ronald Grossey and drawn by Charel Cambré.
