= Jean-Marie Pfaff =

Belgian footballer (born 1953)

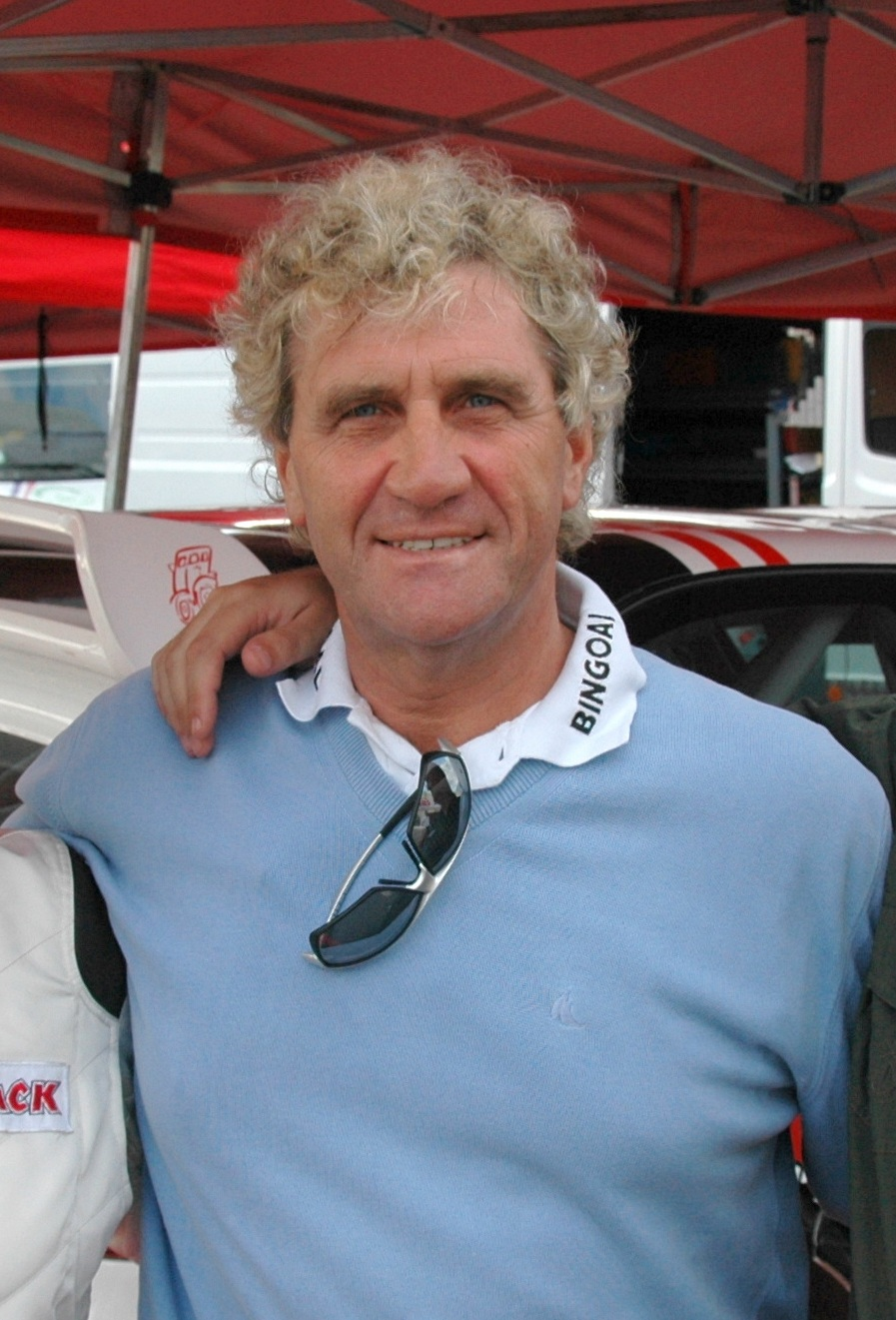
- Pfaff in 2007

Personal information
- Date of birth: 4 December 1953 (age 72)
- Place of birth: Lebbeke, East Flanders, Belgium
- Height: 1.80 m (5 ft 11 in)
- Position: Goalkeeper

Senior career*
Years	Team	Apps	(Gls)
1972–1982	Beveren	305	(0)
1982–1988	Bayern Munich	156	(0)
1988–1989	Lierse	23	(0)
1989–1990	Trabzonspor	22	(0)
Total		506	(0)

International career
1976–1987	Belgium	64	(0)

Managerial career
- 1998–1999: K.V. Oostende
Medal record
Representing Belgium
UEFA European Championship
Runner-up	1980 Italy
- * Club domestic league appearances and goals

Jean-Marie Pfaff (born 4 December 1953) is a Belgian former professional footballer who played as a goalkeeper and spent most of his professional career with Beveren and Bayern Munich. Pfaff was capped 64 times playing for Belgium, and participated at the 1982 FIFA World Cup and 1986 FIFA World Cup tournaments. Pfaff was named goalkeeper of the 1986 FIFA World Cup, and he was the first player to receive the IFFHS World's Best Goalkeeper award in 1987.

== Early life ==
Pfaff was born in Lebbeke, East Flanders. He grew up in a family of 12 children (6 boys, 6 girls). His father was a door-to-door salesman of fabrics and carpets. The Pfaff family lived in a caravan in Lebbeke and in the summer, the whole family was obliged to help their father with sales.

As a street footballer, his goalkeeping skills were quickly noticed. Pfaff joined the youth team of Eendracht Aalst, the club of his brothers Louis and Jean-Baptist Pfaff. When Louis and Jean-Baptist arranged a transfer to KSK Beveren in 1965, the younger brothers Jean-Marie and Toon also made the switch to the Waasland club.

When Jean-Marie Pfaff was barely 12, his father died of cancer. Obviously, this had enormous consequences for the family.

== Club career ==
=== Beveren ===
At the end of the 1971–72 season, aged 18, Pfaff made his debut for the first team of Beveren in the Belgian First Division. By then, it was already certain that the club would be relegated to the second division. The following season, Pfaff became a regular goalkeeper. Beveren also became champions, which meant the team was immediately promoted back to the first division.

At the end of the second half of the 1973–74 season, Pfaff was moved to the bench by coach Jef Jurion, but under Urbain Braems he became the first goalkeeper in the 1974–75 season.

During the 1977–78 season, Pfaff reached the Belgian top with SK Beveren. The team then just missed out on the European places in the competition (5th place), but it did manage to reach the Belgian Cup final for the first time. With a 2–0 victory against Charleroi after a few decisive saves by Pfaff, the team also grabbed the cup. This allowed them to compete in Europe the following season. In 1978, Jean-Marie Pfaff won the Belgian Golden Shoe, a trophy that is rarely awarded to goalkeepers.

Beveren would reach its peak in the 1978–79 season. The club became national champion for the first time in its existence, with Pfaff not conceding a goal in half of the matches (17). In the European Cup Winners' Cup, Beveren surprisingly eliminated Inter Milan in the quarter-finals after strong performances by Pfaff. In the semi-finals they were eliminated by Barcelona after two 1–0 defeats. These were Pfaff's first goals conceded in the tournament (both penalties).

Beveren reached the Belgian Cup final again in 1980, after a brilliant performance by Pfaff in the return match of the semi-final against Standard. However, the cup final was surprisingly lost against underdog Thor Waterschei (1–2) and so the team was deprived of European Cup football the following season. That 1980–81 season ended in a major downer for Pfaff when he was suspended for four months by the RBFA on 11 March 1981. After all, Pfaff had allegedly kneed linesman Thirion after the cup match at home against Lokeren. In those days, the officials' report was all that mattered, but television images would later show that there was no question of a knee strike at all. After the 1982 FIFA World Cup, the 28-year old Pfaff moved to the German top club Bayern Munich for a transfer fee equivalent to 400,000 euros.

=== Bayern Munich ===
In Munich he didn't only discover a new football culture, but he was also exposed to the immense pressure of an absolute top club. Despite a false start in his debut match at Bremen (he underestimated one of Uwe Reinders' famous long throw-ins and rebounded the ball into his own goal), Pfaff quickly became an indispensable link in the team. Three years after the abrupt end of Sepp Maier's career - the Bayern icon who was critically injured in a car accident, Bayern had finally found a successor for the goalkeeper for the coming years.

Although in his first season at the club, Bayern disappointed at all levels. In October, they were already knocked out in the second round of the German cup by Eintracht Braunschweig, and they finished fourth in the Bundesliga. In the European Cup Winners' Cup, Scottish side (and eventual winners) Aberdeen proved too strong in the quarter-finals. Due to his performances in the second half of the season, Pfaff was named a world-class goalkeeper by the leading magazine Kicker in July 1983.

In the 1983-84 season Bayern finished on a fourth place again. In the second round of the UEFA Cup, Bayern drew twice 0–0 against PAOK. The penalty shootout ended when Pfaff saved Konstantinos Malioufas' attempt, and then scored Bayern's tenth penalty himself. Nevertheless, the European adventure ended early when they were eliminated by Tottenham Hotspur in the third round. On 31 May 1984 they did win the DFB Cup after a draw in the final against Borussia Mönchengladbach. In the penalty shootout, Michael Rummenigge scored the decisive goal after Pfaff had saved Norbert Ringels' attempt.

Pfaff became champion for the first time with Bayern Munich in the 1984–85 season when they finished with a 4-point lead over Werder Bremen. The team reached the semi-finals of the Cup Winners' Cup after 2 great victories against Roma, but they were eliminated by the English Everton. At home, Bayern was stuck at 0–0, and in the return match at Goodison Park they lost 1–3. The final of the DFB Pokal was reached again, but the match in the Olympiastadion in Berlin was surprisingly lost 1–2 against Bayer Uerdingen.

In the first half of the 1985–86 season, Pfaff was plagued by injuries, even lost his starting place at Bayern and had to fear that he would not be in the Belgian selection that was qualified for the 1986 World Cup in Mexico. But with his iron will, he worked on his comeback and convinced all his premature critics. The competition was concluded with the same number of points as Werder Bremen (49), but with 1 more win Bayern became champions again. A cup win was also celebrated once more. The team proved to be too strong for VfB Stuttgart in the final and won easily with 5–2. Their story in the European Cup had already ended in the quarter-finals in Brussels where they lost 2–0 to Anderlecht. In the Kicker rankings, Pfaff climbed once more from international class to world class.

The 1986–87 Bundesliga was convincingly won by Bayern for the third time in a row, eventually ending with a 6 point lead over Hamburger SV. Their cup story had already ended in November after a heavy 3–0 defeat at Fortuna Düsseldorf. In the European Cup, Bayern were now able to eliminate Anderlecht with two wins this time. In the return match at the Bernabeu stadium, Real Madrid were also unable to make up for their heavy 1-4 defeat in the first leg. The final was played on 27 May 1987 in the Praterstadion, Vienna. Bayern, missing several key players due to suspensions and injuries, lost to FC Porto. For his performances with Bayern and with Belgium at the World Cup, Pfaff received the first trophy of best goalkeeper in the world in 1987 by the IFFHS.

Bayern lost the title to Werder Bremen in the 1987–88 season, finishing second. In both the German Cup and the European Cup, they were eliminated in the quarter-finals (against Hamburger SV and Real Madrid respectively).

At the age of 35, Pfaff decided to return to his home country and signed a contract with SK Lierse. The huge difference in level with a club like Bayern did not deter him.

=== Lierse ===
The club finished in mid-table in tenth place in the 1988–89 season. After one season in Belgium, he accepted the request of his former coach Urbain Braems to join him at Trabzonspor in Turkey.

=== Trabzonspor ===
Pfaff was welcomed as a true national hero at the Turkish club. The team ended on a third place in the 1989–90 1.Lig and could qualify for the Cup Winners' Cup after they lost the final of the Turkish Cup to Beşiktaş. The Turkish Cup final turned out to be the last professional game for Pfaff, as he decided to end his 18 year long-career as a goalkeeper in 1990. Despite the increasing injury problems, he would later regret retiring at the age of 36.

== International career ==
In 1976, the new Belgian coach Guy Thys decided to rejuvenate the Red Devils' selection for the 1976 European Championship. Pfaff was called up and with him other young promises such as Willy Wellens, René Verheyen and Michel Renquin. And the debut of the Beveren goalkeeper was memorable. Pfaff made his debut in the quarter finals against the Dutch team of Johan Cruijff. He did his best, intimidated Johan Neeskens in front of the Italian referee Alberto Michelotti, and made sure that he missed a penalty. The Red Devils took the lead thanks to a goal by Roger van Gool, but then the Netherlands equalized through Johnny Rep and Belgium eventually lost 1–2 after a nice lob by Cruijff. Pfaff left the field smiling and as if nothing had happened to congratulate the opponent with number fourteen. “Nobody understood me, he explained later, but Cruijff had scored a beautiful goal and my sense of sportsmanship forced me to give him a compliment.”

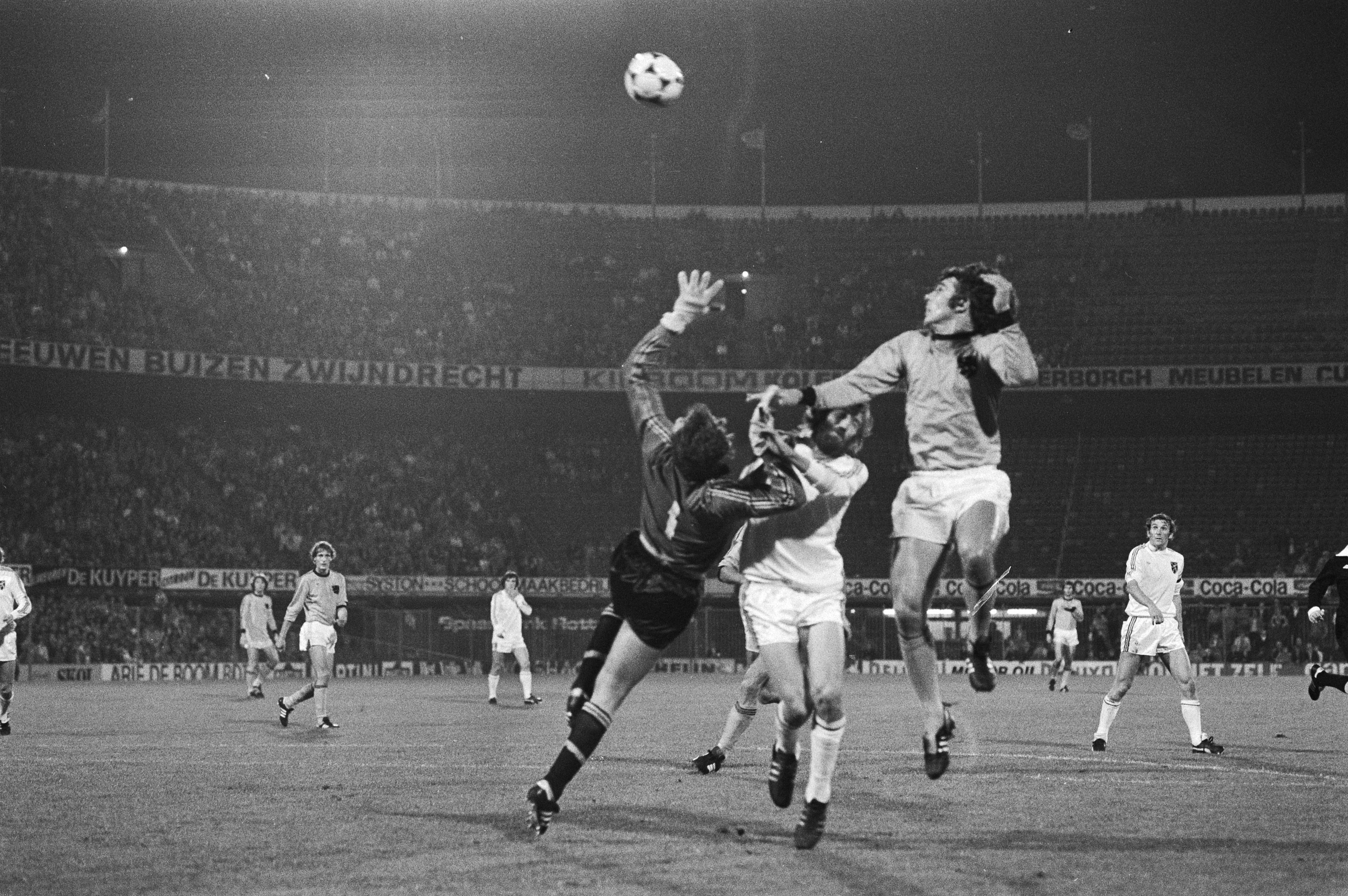
Pfaff in duel with Van Hanegem in a friendly game against the Netherlands, 1979

In the national team, Pfaff was a key player in the 1980 European Championship in Italy. It was partly thanks to the saves of the goalkeeper that Belgium reached the final against West Germany, who was lost 2–1. But Belgium was one of the emerging national teams with Pfaff as the star player.

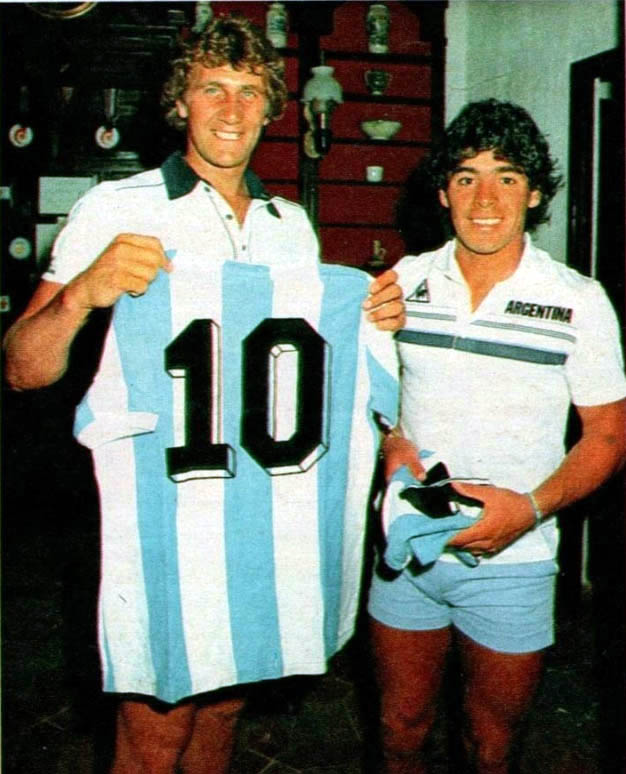
Pfaff with Argentine star Diego Maradona during the 1982 World Cup

The 1982 World Cup in Spain was much anticipated. Belgium won the tournament's opening game against Argentina. Pfaff played at a high level, but his Spanish adventure was shorter than expected. In the third match against Hungary, he clashed with Eric Gerets and both were knocked out and forced to return home. Without the two star players, Belgium was eliminated after the second group stage. "If Eric and I had not been injured, Belgium could have reached the final and... won. We would not have been afraid of anyone, not of Brazil and not of Italy.", Pfaff mentioned later.

Pfaff also defended the Belgian goal at the 1984 European Championship, a tournament in which the Red Devils did not get past the group stage and finished third in Group A behind France and Denmark. Two years later, Belgium qualified for the World Cup in Mexico. That World Cup was a highlight in the career of the Belgian goalkeeper, who became one of the great stars. Prior, Pfaff had suffered a serious injury and was competing with Jacky Munaron of Anderlecht. “When you are a regular player at Bayern again.”, coach Thys promised him, ”you will go to Mexico.”

Belgium was the surprise of the World Cup. Pfaff, who was called 'El Simpatico' by the Mexican football fans, played at a high level with great saves (especially against the Soviet Union in the eighth final) and reached the semi-finals with his team. Belgium lost to Diego Maradona's Argentina, who ended the dream of the Red Devils with two goals. "The mood of the group before the match was similar to what was in the dressing room before the final of the 1980 European Championship. In both cases we were convinced that we had no chance. We also had a lot of respect for Germany and Argentina. When I see Maradona dribbling past our entire defence, I think that if there had been a man like Ludo Coeck, Diego would never have been able to achieve such a feat." Belgium finished fourth, after losing the consolation final 4–2 to Michel Platini's France. Upon returning home, the team was greeted by 10,000 fans who celebrated on the Grand Place in Brussels. Pfaff's adventure in the national team ended in 1987, when the goalkeeper was 33 years old. He played his last international match on 23 September 1987 against Bulgaria. He was then succeeded by Michel Preud'homme.

== Style of play ==
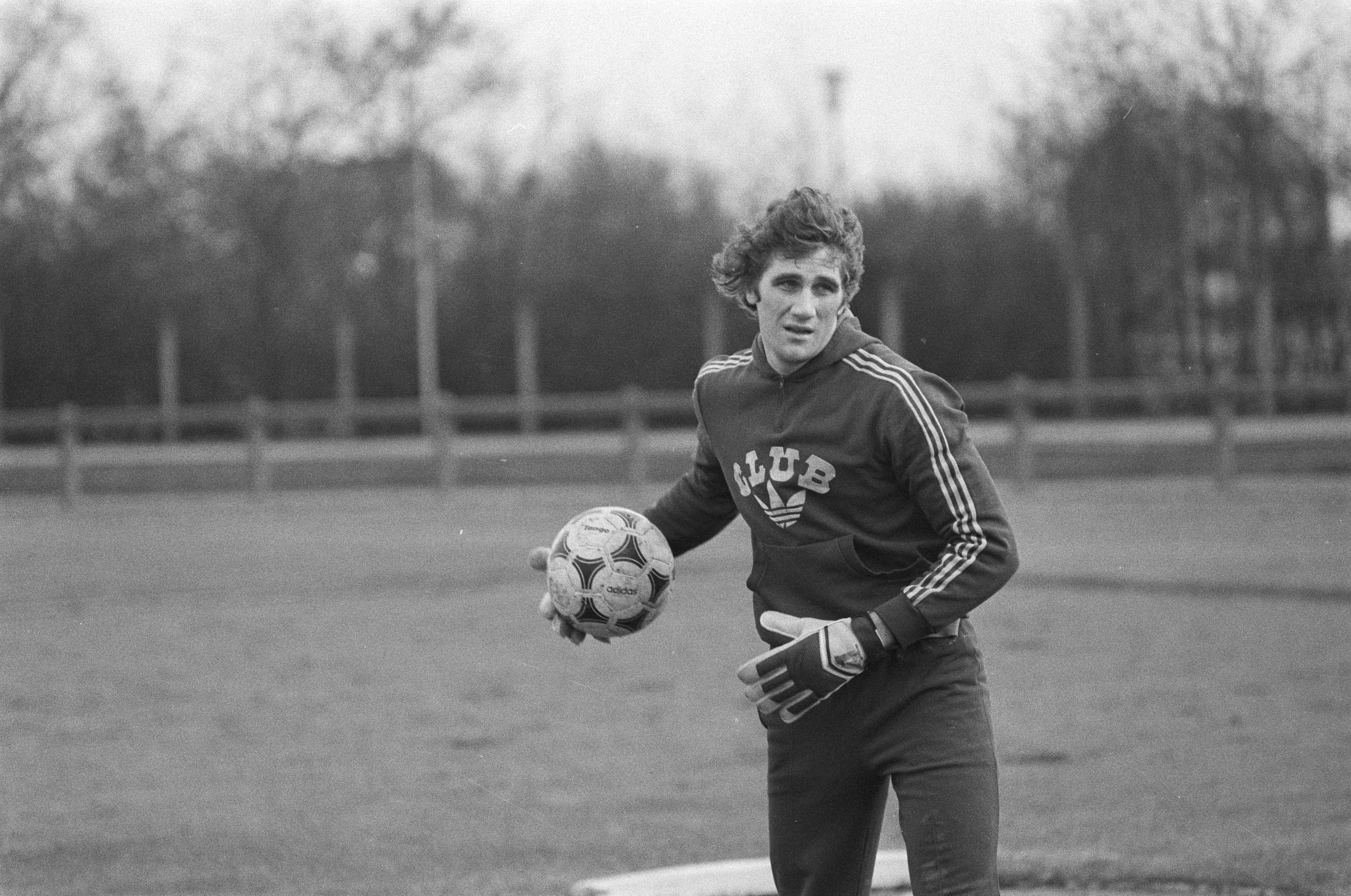
Jean-Marie Pfaff during a training of the national team in 1980

Despite his sturdy physical build, Pfaff possessed quick reflexes and was known for his spectacular playing style, as well as his ability to produce acrobatic saves, which made him an effective shot-stopper. He was also known for his extroverted and outspoken character, his lively and eccentric personality, and his strong and charismatic leadership qualities, as well as his confidence, fair-play, and professionalism, which made him an excellent organiser of the defence and a popular figure among the fans; as such, due to his cheerful attitude on the pitch and humorous demeanor, he earned him the nickname El Simpático ("Mr. Nice Guy," in Spanish) during the 1986 World Cup in Mexico. He also excelled at quickly rushing off his line; moreover, although he was not the tallest goalkeeper, his large hands aided him when coming out to claim the ball, which made him an authoritative presence in goal. Furthermore, he was renowned for his penalty–stopping abilities. Despite his goalkeeping ability, however, and his reputation as one of the best goalkeepers in the world in his prime, and as one of Belgium's greatest goalkeepers ever – with some in the sport even ranking him as one of the best goalkeepers of all time –, he was also known to be inconsistent and prone to occasional errors. (Note: See)

== Farewell match ==
To say goodbye to football, a farewell match was organized on the Beerschot field in 1991. The "Belgium of the eighties" squad faced a selection of world stars, including Franz Beckenbauer, Ruud Krol, Michel Platini, Roger Milla, Alain Giresse and Søren Lerby. The match was broadcast live in 36 countries.

== After retirement ==
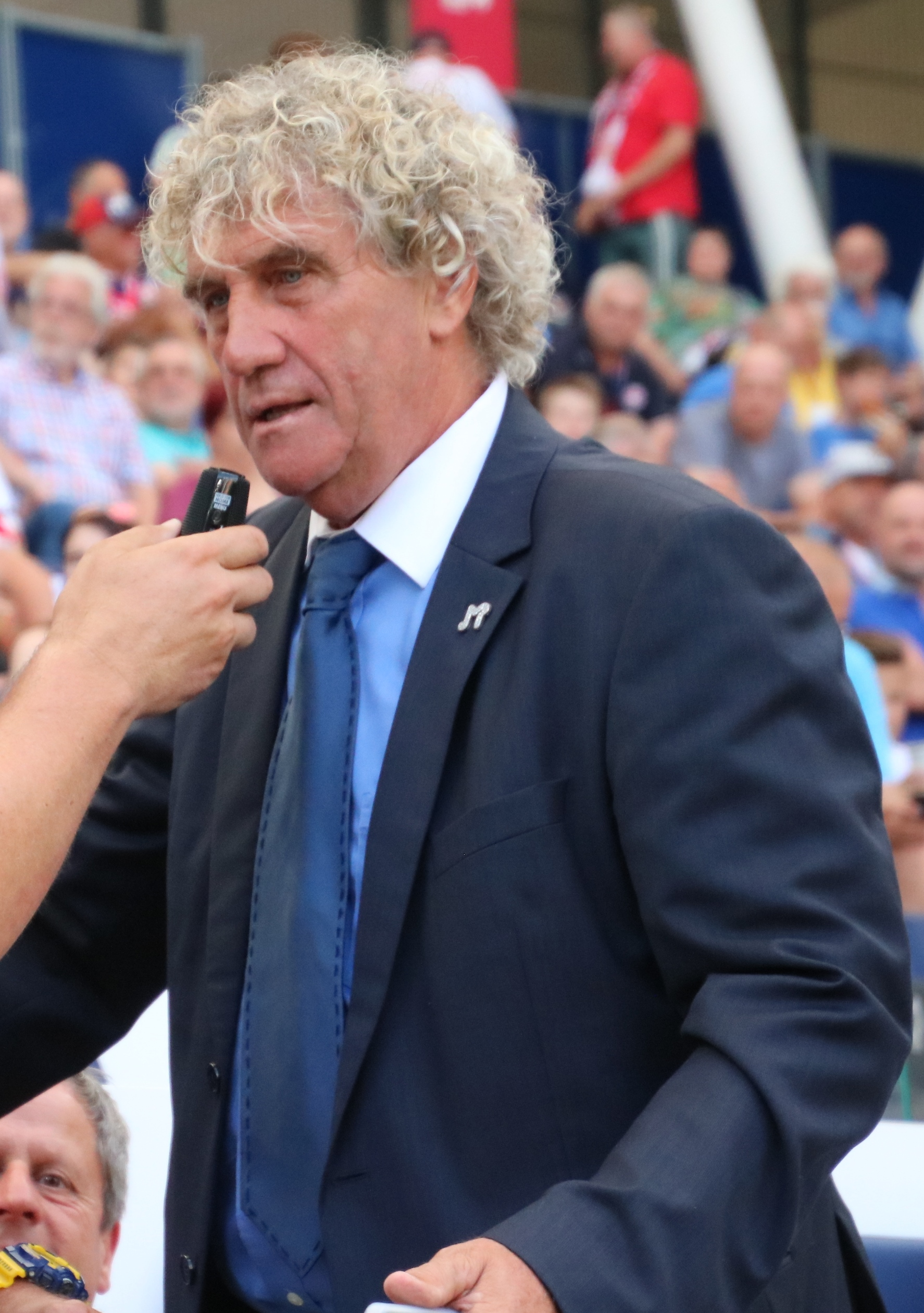
Pfaff in 2017 (Red Bull Salzburg–Anderlecht)

Pfaff had 2 short periods as a coach, first at KSV Sottegem in 1993, a few years later at Oostende (1998).

Pfaff was named by Pelé as one of the top 125 greatest living footballers in March 2004. He was a representative of company United Sol Energy in 2005. The company became the sponsor of the former East German record champion BFC Dynamo before the 2005-06 season. Pfaff became a member of BFC Dynamo and promoted the establishment of a new youth sports school at the club. The new youth sports school at BFC Dynamo was meant to bear his name. Pfaff visited the Sportforum Hohenschönhausen and participated in training with youth teams of BFC Dynamo. However, the sponsorship never materialized. Pfaff resigned from the club on 11 August 2006 and terminated his membership.

In 2023, a pop up museum around Pfaff opened in the former town hall of Beveren. Throughout his career, Pfaff collected a large collection of jerseys, photos and other souvenirs. After welcoming tens of thousands of visitors, the project was extended for a third time in early 2025.

== Trivia ==
- In 1987, Pfaff had a small role in the German movie Zärtliche Chaoten
- In 1990, Pfaff had a guest role in the Flemish sitcom F.C. De Kampioenen. He would reappear in the series in 1999.
- He was a TV star in Belgium and the Netherlands with the reality show De Pfaffs showing him and his family from 2002 to 2012.
- Pfaff appeared in the 2008 children's movie Plop en de Kabouterbaby, produced by Studio 100.
- In 2015, Pfaff had a guest role in the German television series Sturm der Liebe.
- In 2024, an intruder was able to enter the studio of the German football show 'Doppelpass' after security mistook him for the ex-Bayern Munich goalkeeper.

== Career statistics ==
Appearances and goals by club, season and competition
Club	Season	League			National cup		League cup		Europe		Total	
Club	Season	Division	Apps	Goals	Apps	Goals	Apps	Goals	Apps	Goals	Apps	Goals
Beveren	1971–72	First Division	4	0	—		—		—		4	0
Beveren	1972–73	Second Division	27	0	—		—		—		27	0
Beveren	1973–74	First Division	32	0	2	0	—		—		34	0
Beveren	1974–75	First Division	36	0	2	0	—		—		38	0
Beveren	1975–76	First Division	33	0	1	0	—		—		34	0
Beveren	1976–77	First Division	34	0	2	0	—		—		36	0
Beveren	1977–78	First Division	34	0	4	0	—		—		38	0
Beveren	1978–79	First Division	33	0	4	0	—		8 (Note: Appearances in UEFA Cup Winners' Cup)	0	45	0
Beveren	1979–80	First Division	22	0	8	0	1	0	2 (Note: Appearances in European Champion Clubs' Cup)	0	33	0
Beveren	1980–81	First Division	25	0	4	0	1	0	—		30	0
Beveren	1981–82	First Division	23	0	6	0	—		4 (Note: Appearances in UEFA Cup)	0	33	0
Beveren	Total		303	0	33	0	2	0	14	0	352	0
Bayern Munich	1982–83	Bundesliga	27	0	2	0	—		4 (Note: Appearances in UEFA Cup Winners' Cup)	0	33	0
Bayern Munich	1983–84	Bundesliga	32	0	8	0	—		4	0	44	0
Bayern Munich	1984–85	Bundesliga	14	0	4	0	—		6 (Note: Appearances in UEFA Cup Winners' Cup)	0	24	0
Bayern Munich	1985–86	Bundesliga	24	0	5	0	—		5	0	34	0
Bayern Munich	1986–87	Bundesliga	34	0	2	0	—		9	0	45	0
Bayern Munich	1987–88	Bundesliga	25	0	5	0	—		5	0	35	0
Bayern Munich	Total		156	0	26	0	0	0	33	0	215	0
Lierse	1988–89	First Division	23	0	—		—		2	0	25	0
Lierse	Total		23	0	0	0	0	0	2	0	25	0
Trabzonspor	1989–90	Süper Lig	25	0	4	0	—		4	0	33	0
Trabzonspor	Total		25	0	4	0	0	0	4	0	33	0
Career total			507	0	63	0	2	0	53	0	625	0

Appearances and goals by national team and year
National team	Year	Apps	Goals
Belgium	1976	1	0
Belgium	1977	4	0
Belgium	1978	5	0
Belgium	1979	3	0
Belgium	1980	8	0
Belgium	1981	4	0
Belgium	1982	9	0
Belgium	1983	4	0
Belgium	1984	8	0
Belgium	1985	4	0
Belgium	1986	10	0
Belgium	1987	4	0
Total		64	0

== Honours and awards ==
Beveren

- Belgian Second Division: 1972–73
- Belgian First Division: 1978–79
- Belgian Cup: 1977–78
- Belgian Supercup: 1979

Bayern Munich

- Bundesliga: 1984–85, 1985–86, 1986–87
- DFB-Pokal: 1983–84, 1985–86
- DFL-Supercup: 1987
- European Cup runner-up: 1986–87

Belgium

- UEFA European Championship runner-up: 1980
- Belgian Sports Merit Award: 1980
- FIFA World Cup fourth place: 1986

Individual

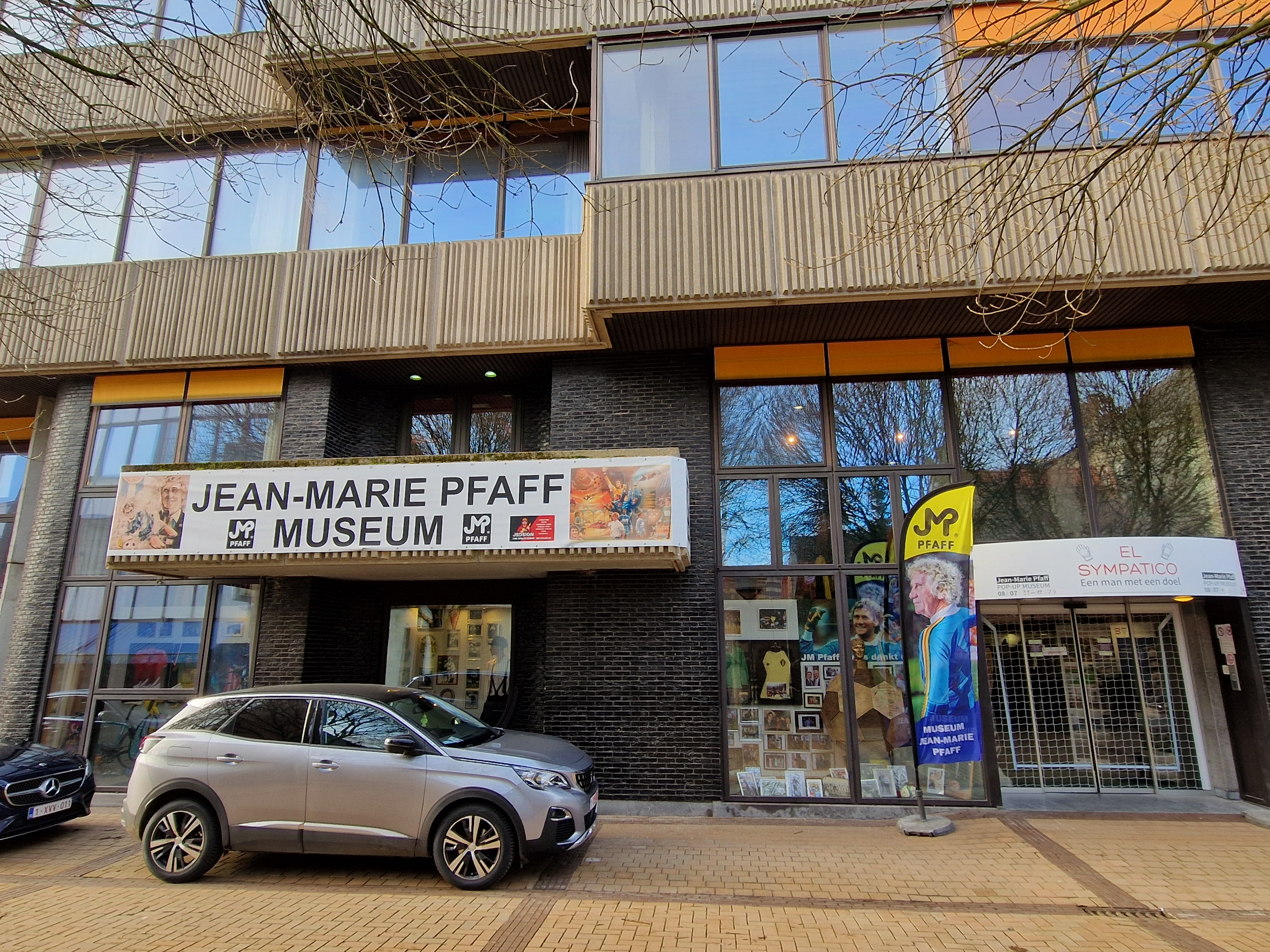
Pop up Museum of Pfaff in Beveren

- Belgian Golden Shoe: 1978
- Kicker Goalkeeper of the Year: 1983
- Kicker German Football Rankings - World Class Goalkeeper: 1983, 1986
- Ballon d'Or nominations: 1983, 1986, 1987
- European Goalkeeper of the Year: 1983, 1987
- FIFA World Cup All-Star Team: 1986
- FIFA World Cup Golden Glove: 1986
- FIFA World Cup Golden Ball (4th place): 1986
- France Football + La Gazzetta dello Sport + Guerin Sportivo World Cup team: 1986
- IFFHS World's Best Goalkeeper of the Year: 1987
- Onze Mondial: 1987
- Belgian Golden Shoe of the 20th Century (6th): 1995
- Voetbal International's 50 World Stars by Raf Willems: 1999
- IFFHS World Keeper of the Century (16th): 2000
- IFFHS European Keeper of the Century (10th): 2000
- Platina 11 (Best Team in 50 Years of Golden Shoe Winners): 2003
- FIFA 100: 2004
- Golden Foot Legends Award: 2014
- World Sports Legends Award: 2016
- Bayern Munich Living Legend: 2017
- Honorary Citizen of Lebbeke, Belgium: 2018
- IFFHS All Time Belgium Dream Team: 2021
- Honorary Citizen of Beveren, Belgium: 2022
- Museum Jean-Marie Pfaff in Beveren: 2023
- Pro League Hall of Fame: 2024

== Books ==
- Nummer Eén by Marcel Van Bergen in 1979, 209 pages (Dutch)
- J.M. Pfaff-De Derde Dimensie by Theo Bauwens in 1983, 152 pages (Dutch)
- De Held van Munchen (celebrity comic) by K. Luyckx and F. Defossez in 1984, 44 pages (Dutch)
- Das Torwartbuch by Jean-Marie Pfaff and Sepp Maier in 1984, 222 pages (German)
- De Pfaffs (celebrity comic) by Ronald Grossey and Charel Cambré in 2003 (Dutch)
- Overleven by Jean-Marie Pfaff in 2007, 247 pages (Dutch)
- J.M. Pfaff-Mein Leben-Vom straßenfußballer zum Welttothuter in 2021, 296 pages (Dutch, German)
