= The New Jim Crow =

2010 book by Michelle Alexander

The New Jim Crow: Mass Incarceration in the Age of Colorblindness
- Author: Michelle Alexander
- Language: English
- Subject: Criminal justice, race discrimination, race relations
- Genre: Non-fiction
- Publisher: The New Press
- Publication date: 2010; new edition 2020
- Publication place: United States
- Media type: Print
- Pages: 312
- ISBN: 978-1-59558-643-8
- Dewey Decimal: 364.973
- LC Class: HV9950 .A437

The New Jim Crow: Mass Incarceration in the Age of Colorblindness is a 2010 book by Michelle Alexander, a civil rights litigator and legal scholar. The book discusses race-related issues specific to African-American males and mass incarceration in the United States, but Alexander noted that the discrimination faced by African-American males is prevalent among other minorities and socio-economically disadvantaged populations. Alexander's central premise, from which the book derives its title, is that "mass incarceration is, metaphorically, the New Jim Crow".

== Overview ==
Though the conventional point of view holds that systemic racial discrimination mostly ended with the civil rights movement reforms of the 1960s, Alexander posits that the U.S. criminal justice system uses the war on drugs as a primary tool for enforcing traditional, as well as new, modes of discrimination and oppression. These new modes of racism have led to not only the highest rate of incarceration in the world, but also a disproportionately large rate of imprisonment for African American men. Were present trends to continue, Alexander writes, the United States would imprison one third of its African American population. When combined with the fact that whites are more likely to commit drug crimes than people of color, the issue becomes clear for Alexander: "the primary targets of [the penal system's] control can be defined largely by race".

This ultimately leads Alexander to argue that mass incarceration is "a stunningly comprehensive and well-disguised system of racialized social control that functions in a manner strikingly similar to Jim Crow". The culmination of this social control is what Alexander calls a "racial caste system", a type of stratification wherein people of color are kept in an inferior position. Its emergence, she believes, is a direct response to the civil rights movement. It is because of this that Alexander argues for issues with mass incarceration to be addressed as issues of racial justice and civil rights. To approach these matters as anything but would be to fortify this new racial caste. Thus, Alexander aims to mobilize the civil rights community to move the incarceration issue to the forefront of its agenda and to provide factual information, data, arguments and a point of reference for those interested in pursuing the issue. Her broader goal is the revamping of the prevailing mentality regarding human rights, equality and equal opportunities in America, to prevent future cyclical recurrence of what she sees as "racial control under changing disguise". According to the author, what has been altered since the collapse of Jim Crow is not so much the basic structure of US society, as the language used to justify its affairs. She argues that when people of color are disproportionately labeled as "criminals", this allows the unleashing of a whole range of legal discrimination measures in employment, housing, education, public benefits, voting rights, jury duty, and so on.

Alexander explains that it took her years to become fully aware and convinced of the entanglements she describes, despite her professional civil rights background. She expects similar reluctance and disbelief on the part of many of her readers. She believes that the problems besetting African American communities are not merely a passive, collateral side effect of poverty, limited educational opportunity or other factors, but a consequence of purposeful government policies. Alexander has concluded that mass incarceration policies, which were swiftly developed and implemented, are a "comprehensive and well-disguised system of racialized control that functions in a manner strikingly similar to Jim Crow".

Alexander contends that in 1982 the Reagan administration began an escalation of the war on drugs, purportedly as a response to a crack cocaine crisis in black ghettos, which was (she claims) announced well before crack cocaine arrived in most inner city neighborhoods. During the mid-1980s, as the use of crack cocaine increased to epidemic levels in these neighborhoods, federal drug authorities publicized the problem, using scare tactics to generate support for their already-declared escalation. The government's successful media campaign made possible an unprecedented expansion of law enforcement activities in America's urban neighborhoods, and this aggressive approach fueled widespread belief in conspiracy theories that posited government plans to destroy the black population (Black genocide)

In 1998, the Central Intelligence Agency (CIA) acknowledged that during the 1980s the Contra faction—covertly supported by the US in Nicaragua—had been involved in smuggling cocaine into the US and distributing it in US cities. Drug Enforcement Administration efforts to expose these illegal activities were blocked by Reagan officials, which contributed to an explosion of crack cocaine consumption in America's urban neighborhoods. More aggressive enforcement of federal drug laws resulted in a dramatic increase in street level arrests for possession. Disparate sentencing policies (the crack cocaine vs. powdered cocaine penalty disparity was 100–1 by weight and remains 18–1 even after recent reform efforts) meant that a disproportionate number of inner city residents were charged with felonies and sentenced to long prison terms, because they tended to purchase the more affordable crack version of cocaine, rather than the powdered version commonly consumed in the suburbs.

Alexander argues that the war on drugs has a devastating impact on inner city African American communities, on a scale entirely out of proportion to the actual dimensions of criminal activity taking place within these communities.

During the past three decades, the US prison population exploded from 300,000 to more than two million, with the majority of the increase due to drug convictions. This led to the US having the world's highest incarceration rate. The US incarceration rate is eight times that of Germany, a comparatively developed large democracy.

Alexander claims that the US is unparalleled in the world in focusing enforcement of federal drug laws on racial and ethnic minorities. In the capital city of Washington, D.C., three out of four young African American males are expected to serve time in prison. While studies show that quantitatively Americans of different races consume illegal drugs at similar rates, in some states black men have been sent to prison on drug charges at rates twenty to fifty times those of white men. The proportion of African American men with some sort of criminal record approaches 80% in some major US cities, and they become marginalized, part of what Alexander calls "a growing and permanent undercaste".

Alexander maintains that this undercaste is hidden from view, invisible within a maze of rationalizations, with mass incarceration its most serious manifestation. Alexander borrows from the term "racial caste", as it is commonly used in scientific literature, to create "undercaste", denoting a "stigmatized racial group locked into inferior position by law and custom". By mass incarceration she refers to the web of laws, rules, policies and customs that make up the criminal justice system and which serve as a gateway to permanent marginalization in the undercaste. Once released from prison, new members of this undercaste face a "hidden underworld of legalized discrimination and permanent social exclusion".

According to Alexander, crime and punishment are poorly correlated, and the present US criminal justice system has effectively become a system of social control unparalleled in any other Western democracy, with its targets largely defined by race. The rate of incarceration in the US has soared, while its crime rates have generally remained similar to those of other Western countries, where incarceration rates have remained stable. The current rate of incarceration in the US is six to ten times greater than in other industrialized nations, and Alexander maintains that this disparity is not correlated to the fluctuation of crime rates, but can be traced mostly to the artificially invoked war on drugs and its associated discriminatory policies. The US embarked on an unprecedented expansion of its juvenile detention and prison systems.

Alexander notes that the civil rights community has been reluctant to get involved in this issue, concentrating primarily on protecting affirmative action gains, which mainly benefit an elite group of high-achieving African Americans. At the other end of the social spectrum are the young black men who are under active control of the criminal justice system (currently in prison, or on parole or probation)—approximately one-third of the young black men in the US. Criminal justice was not listed as a top priority of the Leadership Conference on Civil Rights in 2007 and 2008, or of the Congressional Black Caucus in 2009. The National Association for the Advancement of Colored People (NAACP) and the American Civil Liberties Union (ACLU) have been involved in legal action, and grassroots campaigns have been organized, however Alexander feels that generally there is a lack of appreciation of the enormity of the crisis. According to her, mass incarceration is "the most damaging manifestation of the backlash against the Civil Rights Movement", and those who feel that the election of Barack Obama represents the ultimate "triumph over race", and that race no longer matters, are dangerously misguided.

Alexander writes that Americans are ashamed of their racial history, and therefore avoid talking about race, or even class, so the terms used in her book may seem unfamiliar to many. Americans want to believe that everybody is capable of upward mobility, given enough effort on his or her part; this assumption forms a part of the national collective self-image. Alexander points out that a large percentage of African Americans are hindered by the discriminatory practices of an ostensibly colorblind criminal justice system, which end up creating an undercaste where upward mobility is severely constrained.

Alexander believes that the existence of the New Jim Crow system is not disproved by the election of Barack Obama and other examples of exceptional achievement among African Americans, but on the contrary the New Jim Crow system depends on such exceptionalism. She contends that the system does not require overt racial hostility or bigotry on the part of another racial group or groups. Indifference is sufficient to support the system. Alexander argues that the system reflects an underlying racial ideology and will not be significantly disturbed by half-measures such as laws mandating shorter prison sentences. Like its predecessors, the new system of racial control has been largely immune from legal challenge. She writes that a human tragedy is unfolding, and The New Jim Crow is intended to stimulate a much-needed national discussion "about the role of the criminal justice system in creating and perpetuating racial hierarchy in the United States".

Court cases discussed
- A
  - Alexander v. Sandoval, 532 U.S. 275 (2001)
  - Armstrong v. United States, 182 U.S. 243 (1901)
  - Atwater v. City of Lago Vista, 532 U.S. 318 (2001)
- B
  - Batson v. Kentucky, 476 U.S. 79 (1986)
  - Brownfield v. South Carolina, 189 U.S. 426 (1903)
  - Brown v. Board of Education, 347 U.S. 483 (1954)
- C
  - California v. Acevedo, 500 U.S. 565, 600 (1991)
  - City of Los Angeles v. Lyons, 461 U.S. 95, 105 (1983)
  - Cotton v. Fordice, 157 F.3d 388 (5th Cir. 1998)
- D
  - Department of Housing and Urban Development v. Rucker, 535 U.S. 125 (2002)
  - Dred Scott v. Sandford, 60 U.S. (How. 19) 393 (1857)
- F
  - Florida v. Bostick, 501 U.S. 429, 441 (1991)
  - Florida v. Kerwick, 512 So.2d 347, 349 (Fla. App. 4 Dist. 1987)
- G
  - Gibson v. Mississippi, 162 U.S. 565 (1896)
  - Gideon v. Wainwright, 372 U.S. 335 (1963)
- H
  - Harmelin v. Michigan, 501 U.S. 967 (1991)
  - Hutto v. Davis, 454 U.S. 370 (1982)
- I
  - Illinois v. Caballes, 543 U.S. 405 (2005)
  - Illinois Migrant Council v. Pilliod, 398 F. Supp. 882, 899 (N.D. Ill. 1975)
- L
  - Lockyer v. Andrade, 538 U.S. 63 (2003)
- M
  - McCleskey v. Kemp, 481 U.S. 279, 327 (1989)
  - McLaurin v. Oklahoma, 339 U.S. 637 (1950)
  - Monell v. Department of Social Services of the City of New York, 436 U.S. 658 (1978)
  - Miller El v. Cockrell, 537 U.S. 322 (2003)
- N
  - Neal v. Delaware, 103 U.S. 370 (1880)
- O
  - Ohio v. Robinette, 519 U.S. 33 (1996)
- P
  - Plessy v. Ferguson, 163 U.S. 537 (1896)
  - Purkett v. Elm, 514 U.S. 756, 771 n. 4 (1995)
- Q
  - Quern v. Jordan, 440 U.S. 332 (1979)
- R
  - Rucker v. Davis, 237 F.3d 1113 (9th Cir. 2001)
  - Ruffin. v. Commonwealth (Virginia) (Note: the index cites this as "Ruffing" and an endnote states "Puffin"; research and a best guess indicates the intent was "Ruffin".)
- S
  - Schneckloth v. Bustamonte, 412 U.S. 218 (1973)
  - Skinner v. Railway Labor Executive Association, 489 U.S. 602, 641 (1980)
  - Smith v. Allwright, 321 U.S. 649 (1944)
  - State v. Rutherford, 93 Ohio App. 3d 586, 593–95, 639 N.E. 2d 498, 503– 4, n. 3 (Ohio Ct. App. 1994)
  - State v. Soto, 324 N.J.Super. 66, 69–77, 83–85, 734 A.2d 350, 352–56, 360 (N.J. Super. Ct. Law Div. 1996)
  - Strauder v. West Virginia, 100 U.S. 303, 308 (1880)
  - Smith v. Mississippi, 162 U.S. 592 (1896)
  - Swain v. Alabama, 380 U.S. 202 (1965)
- T
  - Terry v. Ohio, 392 U.S. 1 (1968)
- U
  - United States v. Brignoni-Ponce, 422 U.S. 873 (1975)
  - United States v. Carolene Products Co., 301 U.S. 144, n. 4 (1938)
  - United States v. Clary, 846 F.Supp. 768, 796-797 (E.D.Mo. 1994)
  - United States v. Flowers, 912 F. 2d 707, 708 (4th Cir. 1990)
  - United States v. Lewis, 921 F. 2d 1294, 1296 (1990)
  - United States v. Martinez-Fuerte, 428 U.S. 543 (1976)
  - United States v. One Parcel of Real Estate Located at 9818 S.W. 94 Terrace, 788 F. Supp. 561, 565 (S.D. Fla. 1992)
  - United States v. Place, 462 U.S. 696 (1983)
  - United States v. Reese, 92 U.S. 214 (1876)
- W
  - Whren v. United States, 517 U.S. 806 (1996)
  - Will v. Michigan Department of State Police, 491 U.S. 58 (1989)
- Y
  - Yick Wo v. Hopkins, 118 U.S. 356, 373-74 (1886)

== Defining "incarceration" ==
Alexander states in the book that she was "careful to define 'mass incarceration' to include those who were subject to state control outside of prison walls, as well as those who were locked in literal cages". The scope of Alexander's definition of "incarceration" includes people who have been arrested (but not tried), people on parole and people who have been released but labelled as "criminals". Alexander's definition is intentionally much broader than the subset of individuals currently in physical detention.

== Reception ==
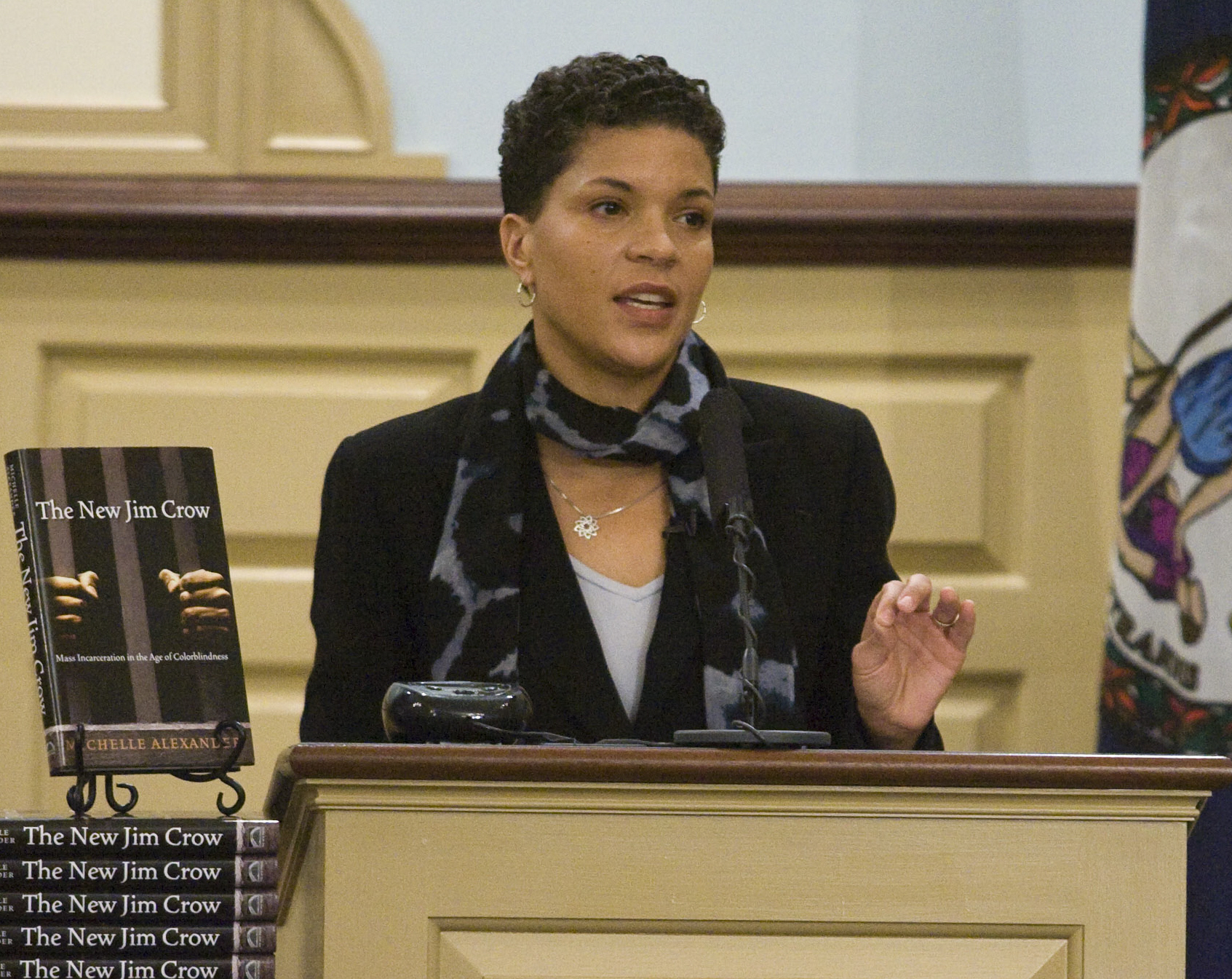
Michelle Alexander presenting The New Jim Crow at the Miller Center of Public Affairs in 2011

Darryl Pinckney, writing in The New York Review of Books, called the book one that would "touch the public and educate social commentators, policymakers, and politicians about a glaring wrong that we have been living with that we also somehow don't know how to face ... [Alexander] is not the first to offer this bitter analysis, but NJC is striking in the intelligence of her ideas, her powers of summary, and the force of her writing".

Jennifer Schuessler, writing in The New York Times, notes that Alexander presents voluminous evidence in the form of both statistics and legal cases to argue that the tough-on-crime policies begun under the Nixon administration and amplified under Reagan's war on drugs have devastated black America, where nearly one-third of black men are likely to spend time in prison during their lifetimes, and where many of these men will be second-class citizens afterwards. Schuessler also notes that Alexander's book goes further, by asserting that the increase in incarceration was a deliberate effort to roll back civil rights gains, rather than a true response to increased rates of violent crime. Schuessler notes that the book has galvanized both black and white readers, some of whom view the work as giving voice to deep feelings that the criminal justice system is stacked against blacks, while others might question its portrayal of anti-crime policies as primarily motivated by racial animus.

Forbes wrote that Alexander "looks in detail at what economists usually miss", and "does a fine job of truth-telling, pointing the finger where it rightly should be pointed: at all of us, liberal and conservative, white and black".

The book received a starred review in Publishers Weekly, saying that Alexander "offers an acute analysis of the effect of mass incarceration upon former inmates" who will be legally discriminated against for the rest of their lives, and described the book as "carefully researched, deeply engaging, and thoroughly readable".

James Forman Jr. argues that though the book has value in focusing scholars (and society as a whole) on the failures of the criminal justice system, it obscures African-American support for tougher crime laws and downplays the role of violent crime in the story of incarceration.

John McWhorter, writing in The New Republic, praised the book for its criticism of the Drug War, but argued that Alexander had simplified the causes of the mass incarceration problem, noting that many Black leaders favored escalating the war on drugs in the 1990s.

John Pfaff, in his book Locked In: The True Causes of Mass Incarceration and How to Achieve Real Reform, criticizes Alexander's assertion that the war on drugs is responsible for mass incarceration. Among his findings are that drug offenders make up only a small part of the prison population, and non-violent drug offenders an even smaller portion; that people convicted of violent crimes make up the majority of prisoners; that county and state justice systems account for the large majority of American prisoners and not the federal system that handles most drug cases; and, subsequently, "national" statistics tell a distorted story when differences in enforcement, conviction, and sentencing are widely disparate between states and counties. The Brookings Institution reconciles the differences between Alexander and Pfaff by explaining two ways to look at the prison population as it relates to drug crimes, concluding "The picture is clear: Drug crimes have been the predominant reason for new admissions into state and federal prisons in recent decades" and "rolling back the war on drugs would not, as Pfaff and Urban Institute scholars maintain, totally solve the problem of mass incarceration, but it could help a great deal, by reducing exposure to prison."

In 2018, The New Jim Crow was listed as one of several banned books that inmates in New Jersey state correctional facilities could not possess.

The 10th anniversary edition (2020) was discussed with Ellen DeGeneres on The Ellen Show on network TV, and reviewed on the front page of the New York Times Book Review section on January 19, 2020.

The New Jim Crow was listed in The Chronicle of Higher Education as one of the 11 best scholarly books of the 2010s, chosen by Stefan M. Bradley. In 2024, it was ranked #69 in the New York Times list of best 100 books of the 21st century.

== Awards ==
- Winner, NAACP Image Awards (Outstanding Non-fiction, 2011)
- Winner of the National Council on Crime and Delinquency's Prevention for a Safer Society (PASS) Award
- Winner of the Constitution Project's 2010 Constitutional Commentary Award
- 2010 IPPY Award: Silver Medal in Current Events II (Social Issues/Public Affairs/Ecological/Humanitarian) category
- Winner of the 2010 Association of Humanist Sociology Book Award
- Finalist, Silver Gavel Award
- Finalist, Phi Beta Kappa Emerson Award
- Finalist, Letitia Woods Brown Book Award

== Translations ==
- Spanish: El color de la justicia: la nueva segregación racial en Estados Unidos, lit. 'The Colour of Justice: The New Racial Segregation in the United States'. Translated by Carmen Valle and Ethel Odriozola. New York City: The New Press. 2017. ISBN 9781620972748.

== Notes ==
a. The persistently lingering result of the lack of land reform, of the fact that the former slaves were not granted any of the property on which they had long labored (unlike many European serfs, emancipated and economically empowered to various degrees by that time, their American counterparts ended up with nothing), is the present extremely inequitable distribution of wealth in the United States along racial lines. 150 years after the Civil War, the median wealth of a black family is a small fraction of the median wealth of a white family.

b. According to Ruth W. Grant of Duke University, the author of the book Strings Attached: Untangling the Ethics of Incentives (Princeton University Press 2011, ISBN 978-0-691-15160-1), the expediency-based plea bargain process, in which 90 to 95% of felony prosecutions never go to trial, but are settled by the defendant pleading guilty, undermines the purpose and challenges the legitimacy of the justice system. Justice won't take place, because "either the defendant is guilty, but gets off easy by copping a plea, or the defendant is innocent but pleads guilty to avoid the risk of greater punishment". The question of guilt is decided without adjudicating the evidence-the fundamental process of determining the truth and assigning proportionate punishment does not take place.

c. Michelle Alexander suggested in a March 2012 New York Times article a possible strategy (she attributed the idea to Susan Burton) for coping with the unjust criminal justice system. If large numbers of the accused could be persuaded to opt out of plea bargaining and demand a full trial by jury, to which they are constitutionally entitled, the criminal justice system in its present form would be unable to continue because of lack of resources (it would "crash"). This last resort strategy is controversial, as some would end up with extremely harsh sentences, but, it is argued, progress often cannot be made without sacrifice.
