= Diorbhail Nic a' Bhriuthainn =

Dorothy Brown (Scottish Gaelic: Diorbhail Nic a' Bhriuthainn; died 1644) was a Scottish Gaelic poet and songwriter who lived on the Isle of Luing in Argyll, Scotland.

== Songwriting ==
She was a prolific songwriter, but only two of her songs survive:

1. Alasdair a Laoigh mo chill ("Alasdair, love of my heart"), about Alasdair Mac Colla, a general in Montrose's army, which she wrote after seeing his ships pass through the sound of Luing on an expedition against the Campbells. The song is in the style of troubadour poetry, where the author is inspired to fall in love with a character based on tales of their reputation.
2. a lament of the duchess of Coll

== Death ==
Brown died in 1644 and is buried in the old churchyard in Luing.
