= Dorothy A. Brown (law professor) =

American law professor

Dorothy A. Brown (born 1960) is a law professor known for her work on the racial implications of federal tax policy. Brown was previously Asa Griggs Candler professor of law at Emory University, and is now the Martin D. Ginsburg Chair in Taxation at Georgetown University Law Center. Brown is also the author of The Whiteness of Wealth: How the Tax System Impoverishes Black Americans—and How We Can Fix It (2021).

== Early life and education ==
Brown grew up in The Bronx in New York City. Her father, James, was a plumber who was unable to join the local union because of his race. Brown graduated high school at age 16. She received a Bachelor of Science from Fordham University in 1980, a JD from Georgetown University Law Center in 1983, and an LLM in Tax from New York University School of Law in 1984.

== Career ==
Brown was initially interested in the Internal Revenue Code and worked as a tax attorney, an investment banker, and was appointed to the Department of Housing and Urban Development in the administration of President George H. W. Bush in 1989. Initially a Republican, she switched her party affiliation to Democrat and supported Barack Obama's successful presidential campaign in 2008.

Brown has been a professor of law at Georgetown University Law Center since 2022. Prior to Georgetown she worked at Emory University, and at the Washington and Lee University School of Law where she was the director of the Frances Lewis Law Center. Before that, she taught at both George Mason University and the University of Cincinnati.

Brown's book, The Whiteness of Wealth: How the Tax System Impoverishes Black Americans—and How We Can Fix It, views tax policies through a critical race theory lens and examines the Black-white wealth gap with an eye towards tax reforms that could help lessen this gap.

Brown has also written two legal textbooks: Federal Income Taxation: Cases, Problems, and Materials; and Critical Race Theory: Cases, Materials and Problems, both published by Thomson West.

Brown writes about the historical and present-day implications of U.S. tax policy for mainstream media outlets such as Bloomberg News, NPR, and CNN.

Brown was featured on the cover of Bloomberg Businessweek in March 2021 with the tagline "Is the Tax Code Racist?" The article outlines some of her research on the ways the existing tax code favors white Americans. It also lays out her reform plan, which would remove exemptions and deductions that increase this inequality. Brown believes that all income should be taxable, including proceeds from investments, gifts, inheritances, and property sales. She also supports an annual tax credit for people whose wealth is below the U.S. median, to help them build up their personal wealth.
