= John Pfaff =

American law professor

John F. Pfaff is an American law professor at Fordham University. He previously served as a John M. Olin Fellow at the Northwestern University School of Law and as a clerk for Judge Stephen F. Williams on the United States Court of Appeals for the District of Columbia Circuit. He was educated at the University of Chicago. His 2017 book Locked In argues that conventional wisdom regarding the causes of high rates of incarceration in the United States is wrong, arguing that, for example, the war on drugs has played a much smaller role than generally thought. Instead, he argues that rising violent crime rates and prosecutorial discretion were major factors in the rise in America's incarceration rate.
