= List of foreign Veikkausliiga players =

This is a list of all foreign players in the Finnish Veikkausliiga, which commenced play in 1990. The following players must meet both of the following two criteria:

1. Have played at least one Veikkausliiga regular season game. Players who were signed by Veikkausliiga clubs, but only played in playoff stages, lower league, cup and/or European games, or did not play in any competitive games at all, are not included.
2. Are considered foreign, i.e., outside Finland determined by the following:

A player is considered foreign if his allegiance is not to play for the national team of Finland.

More specifically,

- If a player has been capped at international level, the national team is used; if he has been capped by more than one country, the highest level (or the most recent) team is used. These include Finnish players with dual citizenship.
- If a player has not been capped at international level, his country of birth is used, except those who were born abroad from Finnish parents or moved to Finland at a young age, and those who clearly indicated to have switched his nationality to another nation.

Clubs listed are those for which the player has played at least one Veikkausliiga game – and seasons are those in which the player has played at least one Veikkausliiga game. Note that a Veikkausliiga season is same as the calendar year.

In bold: players still active in Veikkausliiga and their respective teams in current season.

== Afghanistan ==
- Mosawer Ahadi – FC Honka, HIFK – 2018, 2021–2022
- Fareed Sadat – FC Lahti, AC Oulu – 2016–18, 2021
- Jabar Sharza – HIFK – 2019–20

== Albania ==
- Donaldo Açka – FC Haka – 2021–2022
- Albion Ademi – FC Inter, PS Kemi, IFK Mariehamn, Lahti – 2016–20, 2022
- Ansi Agolli – VPS – 2007–08
- Hysen Memolla – KPV – 2019
- Dritan Stafsula – AC Allianssi, Tampere United, AC Oulu – 2004–05, 2007
- Ridvan Zeneli – RoPS, FF Jaro, HJK – 1996–98, 2002–05

== Algeria ==
- Mehdi Boukassi – FC Haka – 2023
- Farid Ghazi – HJK – 2006–07
- Boussad Houche – IFK Mariehamn – 2010
- Mohamed Khazrouni – Atlantis FC – 2001
- Mohamed Medjoudj – HJK – 2007
- Yacine Slatni – AC Oulu – 2007
- Kheireddine Zarabi – TPS – 2007–08
- Billal Zouani – Atlantis FC – 2001

== Andorra ==
- Marc Vales – SJK – 2016–18

== Angola ==
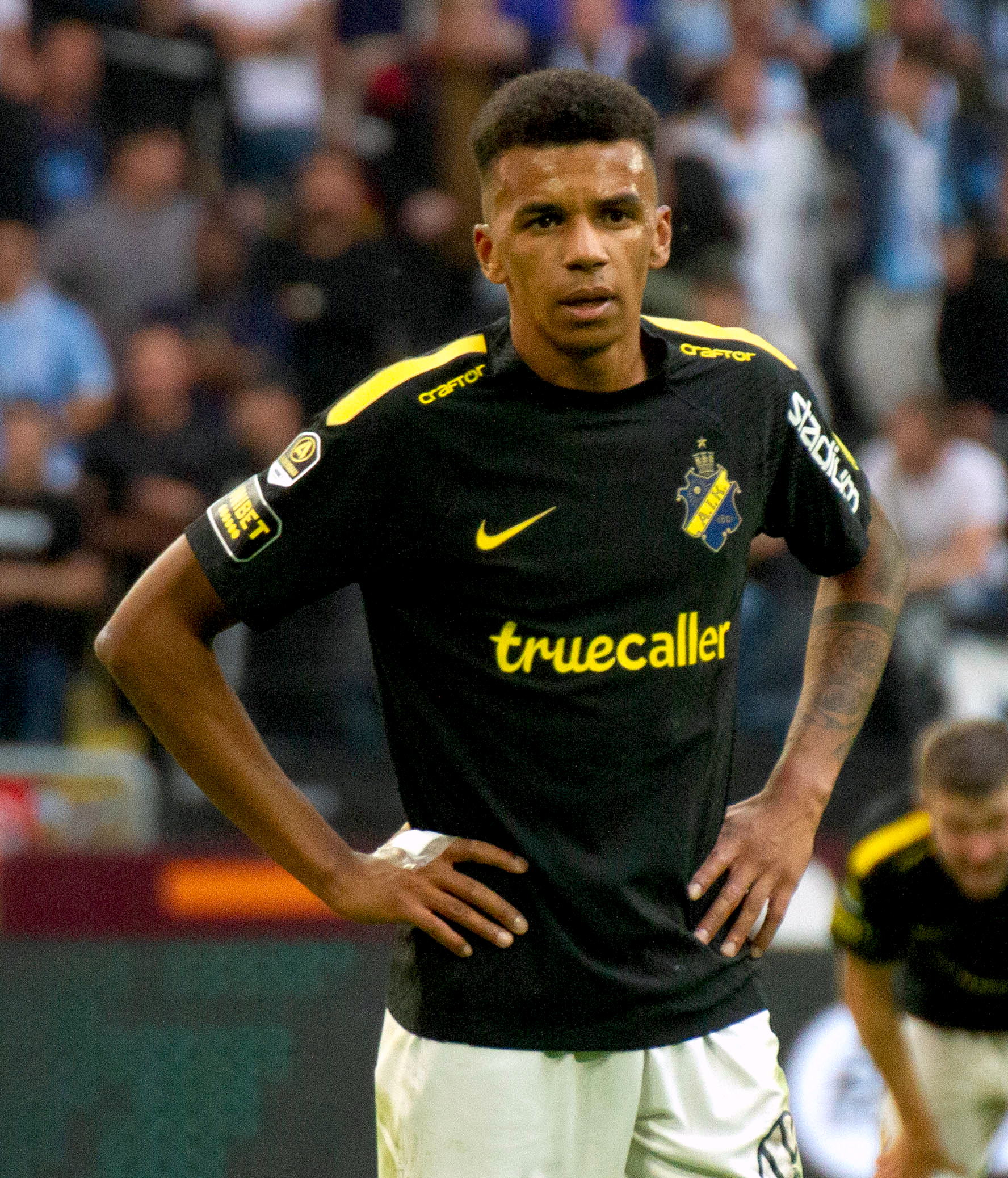
Rui Modesto played 50 matches for Honka

- Antonio Correia – FC Inter – 2008
- Rui Modesto – FC Honka – 2020–2022
- Igor Nascimento – FC Haka – 2005

== Argentina ==
- Luciano Álvarez – FC Inter – 2001–04
- Rodrigo Arciero – SJK, FC Inter Turku – 2021, 2022–2023
- Maximiliano Asís – FC Inter – 2012
- Luciano Balbi – FC Inter – 2019
- Daniel Bazán – FC Inter – 2002–03
- Samuel Cappa – FC Inter – 2000
- Martín Civit – FC Inter – 2009
- Diego Corpache – FC Inter, FC Haka – 2001–09
- Pablo Cortizo – FC Inter – 2013
- Luis Alberto Cuenca – FC Jazz – 1996
- Fernando Della Sala – FC Inter – 2000–03
- Gastón Escudero – FC Jazz – 2000
- Gabriel Flores – FC Inter – 2000–02
- Carlos Fondacaro – FF Jaro – 2014
- Lucas Garcia – FC Honka, PK-35 Vantaa, FC Inter – 2014, 2016–18
- **Valentin Gasc** – **SJK Seinäjoki** – 2022–
- Emmanuel Ledesma – SJK Seinäjoki – 2020–21
- **Juan Lescano – Haka** – 2023, 2025–
- Michael López – AC Oulu, FC Honka, FC Lahti – 2022, 2023, 2024
- Pedro Massacessi – FC Jazz – 1997
- Gonzalo Miceli – SJK Seinäjoki – 2024
- Favio Orsi – FC Jazz – 1997
- Pablo Parmo – FC Inter – 2001, 2003–04
- Raúl Peralta – FC Inter – 2000
- Arístides Pertot – FC Inter, Tampere United, TPS – 2000–09
- Pibe – FC Inter – 2021
- Sebastián Rusculleda – PS Kemi – 2018
- Federico Scoppa – FC Inter – 2011
- Luis Solignac – IFK Mariehamn – 2013–14
- Guillermo Sotelo – HIFK – 2022
- Mario Vargas – TPS – 1996
- Claudio Verino – FC Inter – 2009

== Armenia ==
- Alexander Tumasyan – FF Jaro – 2013–14
- Valeriy Voskonyan – VPS – 2019
- Yvan Yagan – IFK Mariehamn – 2020

== Australia ==
- Mark Byrnes – FC Hämeenlinna – 2004
- Jacob Esposito – PS Kemi – 2018
- Dylan Fox – FC Lahti – 2024
- **Mitchell Glasson – KTP** – 2025–
- Alen Harbas – KTP – 2023
- Luke Ivanovic – FC Lahti – 2024
- Peter Makrillos – IFK Mariehamn – 2020
- Dylan Murnane – IFK Mariehamn, HJK – 2018–19, 2021
- Sabit Ngor – Ilves – 2023
- Levent Osman – Tampere United – 2002
- Harry Sawyer – VPS – 2023
- Jordan Simpson – FF Jaro – 2008
- **Luka Smyth** – **VPS** – 2024–
- Brandon Wilson – SJK – 2021
- Tete Yengi – VPS, KuPS – 2022, 2023

== Austria ==
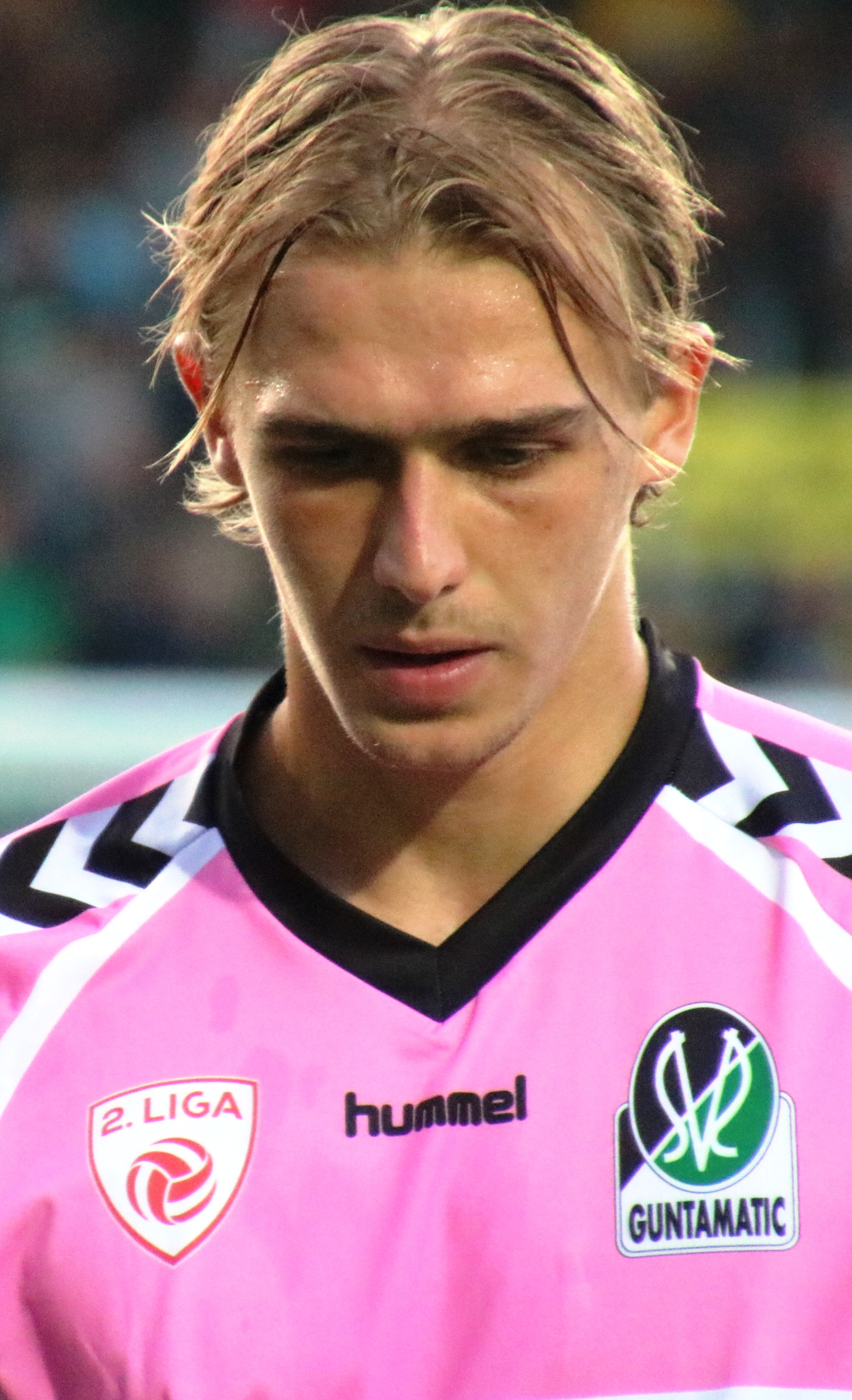
As of January 2025, Johannes Kreidl has played 121 matches for KuPS

- Mehdi Hetemaj – AC Oulu – 2022
- **Johannes Kreidl** – **KuPS** – 2016, 2021–
- Manuel Martic – HJK – 2022
- Benjamin Mulahalilovic – FC Lahti – 2024
- Felix Strauß – FC Lahti – 2024
- Stefan Umjenovic – KPV – 2019
- Aleksandar Vucenovic – FC Haka – 2021

== Azerbaijan ==
- Cem Felek – RoPS – 2017
- Elkhan Hasanov – TPS, KTP – 1997, 1999–2000
- Ozan Kökçü – HJK – 2024–2025
- Vyacheslav Lychkin – TPS – 1997

== Bangladesh ==
- Tariq Kazi – Ilves – 2018–19

== Belarus ==
- Aleksandr Gridyushko – RoPS – 1993
- Anatoli Koksharov – TP-47 – 2005
- Valeri Tsyganenko – TP-47 – 2005
- Vitali Varivonchik – FF Jaro – 1998

== Belgium ==
- Dickson Agyeman – FF Jaro, TPS – 2011–12
- Alessandro Albanese – HJK Helsinki – 2024
- **Álex Craninx – IF Gnistan** – 2025–
- Hosine Chebaïki – AC Allianssi – 2005
- Mustapha Douaï – AC Allianssi – 2005
- Grégory Goffin – AC Allianssi – 2005
- Floribert Ngalula – TPS – 2011
- Evangelos Patoulidis – FC Haka – 2024
- Jorn Vancamp – Ilves – 2022

== Benin ==
- **Charlemagne Azongnitode – AC Oulu** – 2025–
- **Olatoundji Tessilimi – SJK Seinäjoki** – 2025–
- Steve Traoré – FC Haka – 2025

== Bermuda ==
- **Djair Parfitt-Williams** – Ilves, **FC Haka** – 2022–2023, 2025–

== Bosnia and Herzegovina ==
- Bahrudin Atajić – SJK – 2015
- Ermin Gadžo – IFK Mariehamn – 2011–12
- Nedim Hiroš – IFK Mariehamn – 2005
- **Faris Krkalić – Ilves** – 2025–
- Toni Markić – KuPS – 2014–15
- Vilim Posinković – RoPS – 2015
- Velibor Pudar – TPV – 1999
- Ivan Sesar – FC Inter – 2018
- Saša Stević – FF Jaro, IFK Mariehamn – 2005–07
- Benjamin Tatar – IF Gnistan – 2024
- Kerim Tatar – IFK Mariehamn – 2021
- Anes Zukić – MyPa – 2004

== Brazil ==
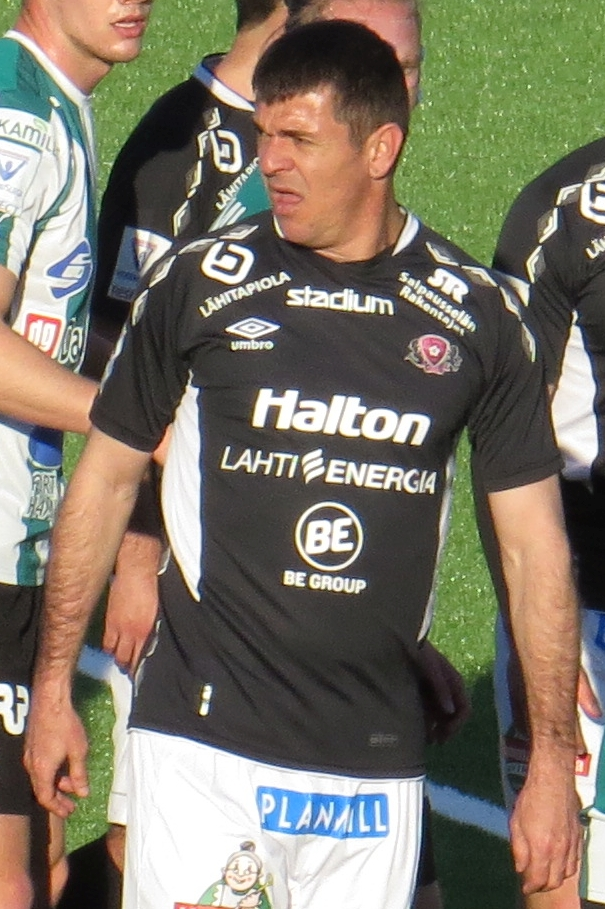
Rafael has played 358 macthes for HJK, Jazz and Lahti

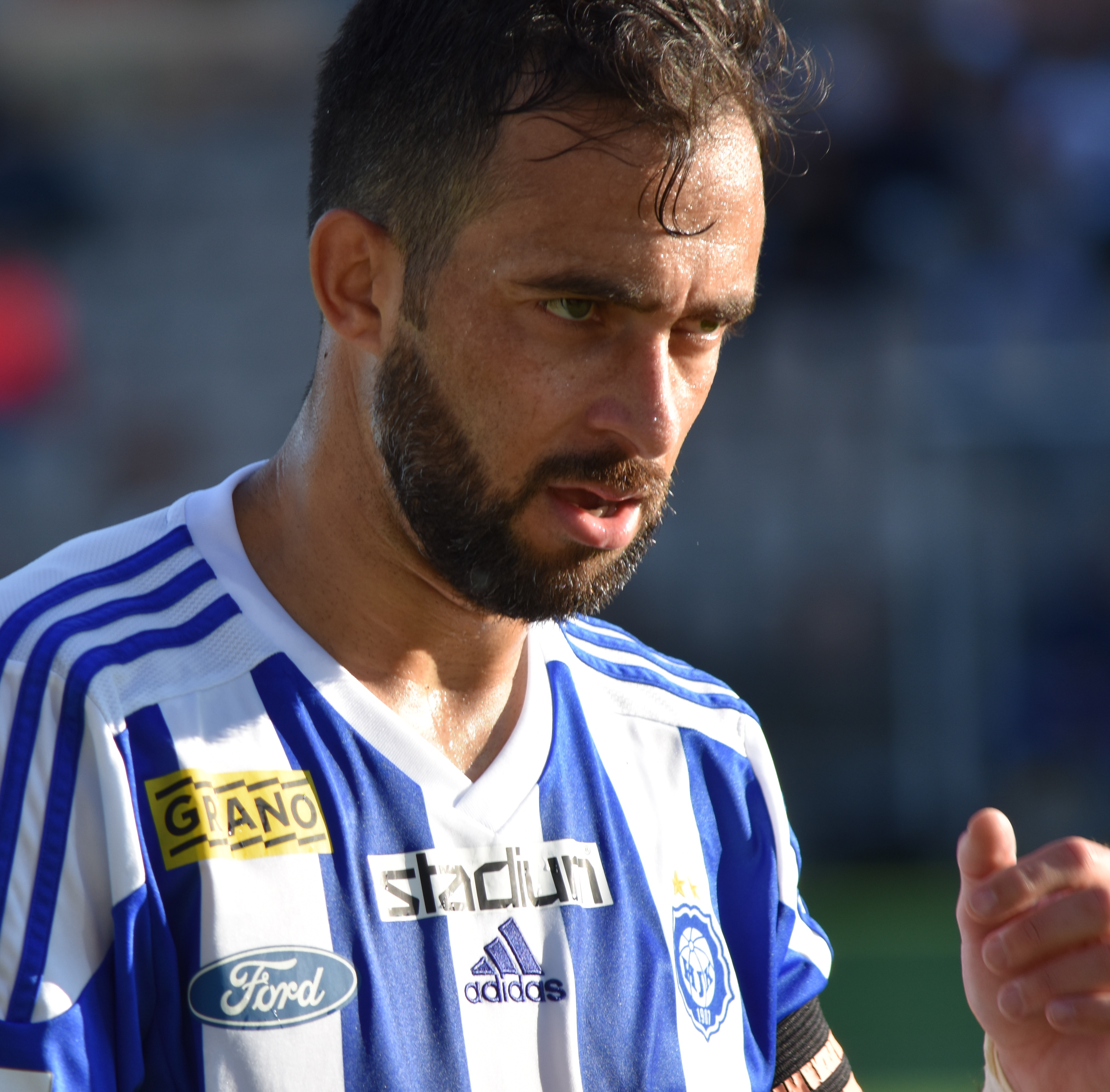
Rafinha has played 258 matches for AC Oulu, Tampere United and HJK

- Ademir – HJK – 2015
- Adriano – Atlantis FC, AC Allianssi, MyPa – 2001–06
- Agnaldo – RoPS – 2018–19
- Ramilson Almeida – HIFK, Ekenäs IF – 2022, 2024
- Marcos André – AC Oulu – 2024
- Alan Henrique – FC Inter, IFK Mariehamn, Lahti – 2017, 2021–23
- Alex – FC Hämeenlinna – 2002
- Allan – SJK – 2015
- Anderson – FC Kuusysi – 1994–95
- Andrey Almeida – FC Inter – 2010
- Batista – SJK – 2019
- Jefferson Batista – Finnairin Palloilijat – 1996
- Felipe Benevides – MyPa – 2009–10
- Betinho – TP-Seinäjoki – 1997
- Bigu – Finnairin Palloilijat – 1998
- Bonilha – FC Lahti – 2016
- Jean Carlos de Brito – TPS – 2020
- Marcelo Cardoso – FC Jazz – 1994
- Carlos Henrique – FF Jaro – 1994
- Cleiton (footballer, born April 1986) – MyPa – 2009
- Vini Dantas – FC Lahti – 2013
- Davi Rancan – FC Inter – 2010
- Dé – IFK Mariehamn – 2021–2023
- Deco – FC Lahti – 1999
- Dema – Tampere United, HJK, FC Haka, MyPa – 2010–12, 2014
- Denis – FF Jaro – 2014–15
- Diego Assis – IFK Mariehamn – 2013–16
- Diogo – FC Inter – 2014–15
- Dionísio – FC Jazz, TPV, Tampere United – 1993–95, 2000–01
- Douglas Caé – VPS – 2018
- Édson – FC Haka – 1992
- Eduardo – FC Jazz – 1998
- Éliton Júnior – KuPS – 2023
- Erikson Carlos – HIFK, KTP – 2019–21
- Ethie – AC Oulu – 2010
- Euller – FC Lahti – 2016
- Fábio – FC Jazz – 2001
- Julio Fernandes – IFK Mariehamn – 2018
- Felipe – IFK Mariehamn – 2022
- Fernando Abreu – IFK Mariehamn – 2011
- Vinicius Frasson – MyPa – 2011
- Ricardo Friedrich – RoPS – 2015–16
- Gabriel Bispo – KuPS – 2022–2023
- **Nicolas Gianini Dantas** – **FC Haka** – 2024–
- Marcelo Grandi – TPV – 1995
- Jair – Ilves, HJK – 2019–2022
- Jeferson Pires – FC Jazz, RoPS – 2001, 2009
- João Batista – FC Lahti – 1999
- Jorge Luís – FC Jazz – 1996
- Jorginho – PS Kemi – 2018
- Julinho – FC Jazz – 2000
- Kassiano Soares – MyPa – 2014
- Lucas Kaufmann – PK-35 Vantaa, FC Honka, Ekenäs IF – 2016, 2018–2023, 2024
- Klauss – HJK – 2018
- Leandro – FF Jaro – 1994
- Leandro Motta – MyPa, FC Lahti – 2014–15
- Liliu – FC Inter – 2020
- **Lucas Cini – FC Haka** – 2025–
- Lucas Rangel – KuPS – 2018–21, 2024
- Luciano – Ilves, FC Kuusysi, FC Lahti – 1992, 1994–95, 1999
- Luis Fernando – FC Viikingit, SJK – 2007, 2014
- Luis Henrique – HIFK, HJK, FC Honka – 2019–21
- Luiz António – FC Jazz, HJK, MyPa – 1992, 1994–96, 1998–2003
- Luquinhas - AC Oulu, Lahti - 2022–23, 2024
- Gladson Macan – FC Honka – 2014
- Gustavo Manduca – HJK – 1998
- Marco Manso – MyPa – 1999–2003, 2005–07
- Marcelo – FC Inter – 1996–97
- Marcio – FC Lahti – 2006
- Márcio Lima – TPS – 2013
- Marcos Túlo – FC Jazz – 1992
- Marcus Vinicius – SJK – 2018
- Marquinhos – FC Jazz – 1998
- Matheus Alves – FC Lahti – 2015, 2023
- Murilo – SJK, HJK – 2020–2021, 2022, 2023
- Muller – Kemi Kings – 2016
- Nadson – SJK – 2019
- Neno – FC Kuusysi – 1994
- Oliveira – HJK – 2005
- Renan Oliveira – FC Inter – 2014
- Pablo Andrade – SJK, Lahti – 2022–2023, 2023–2024
- Paolo – Ilves – 1993
- Paulo Ricardo – KuPS – 2021–2022
- Pedro Vitor – KuPS – 2020
- Stéfano Pinho – MyPa – 2014
- Piracaia – FC Jazz, HJK, KTP, Atlantis FC, FC Hämeenlinna, FF Jaro – 1992–2004, 2005–07
- Marco Pogioli – FC Jazz, FC Haka, KuPS – 1997–2003
- Rafael – HJK, FC Jazz, FC Lahti – 1997–2000, 2005–10, 2012–16
- Rafinha – AC Oulu, Tampere United, HJK – 2007–11, 2016–19, 2021–2022
- Laercio Ramos Junior – FC Inter – 2007
- Reginaldo – FF Jaro – 2015
- Bernardo Ribeiro – IFK Mariehamn – 2013–14
- Marcello Ribeiro – FC Hämeenlinna – 2004
- Robério – AC Allianssi – 2004
- Robert – FC Jokerit – 1999
- Dennys Rodrigues – AC Oulu – 2010
- Igor Rodrigues – FC Lahti – 2003
- Romualdo – Ilves – 1993
- Rudinei – FC Jazz – 2001
- Sávio Roberto – HIFK, VPS – 2022, 2023
- Stenio – FC Lahti – 2017–18
- Tadeu Terra – MyPa – 2011
- Talles – KuPS – 2022
- Toró – HIFK – 2019
- Francisco Torres (Brazilian footballer) – MyPa – 2011
- Rodrigo Vaz – FC Jazz, HJK, FC Lahti, Tampere United – 1993–2003
- Victor Luiz – HJK – 2019
- Vitinho – HIFK – 2020
- Weslen Júnior – SJK Seinäjoki – 2023

== Bulgaria ==
- Kiril Aleksandrov – FF Jaro – 2005
- Vasil Banov – TPV – 1999
- Sergei Dimitrov – TPV – 1999
- Spas Gigov – RoPS – 2005
- Angel Ginev – FF Jaro – 2004–06
- Strati Iliev – TPV, FC Jokerit, FC Jazz – 1999–2001
- Nikolai Markov – Lahden Reipas – 1991
- Borislav Panov – Lahden Reipas – 1991

== Burkina Faso ==
- Aristide Bancé – HJK – 2014
- Hassane Bandé – HJK – 2023–2025
- **Kouamé Botué** – **FC Inter Turku** – 2024–
- **Rachide Gnanou – IF Gnistan** – 2025–

== Cameroon ==
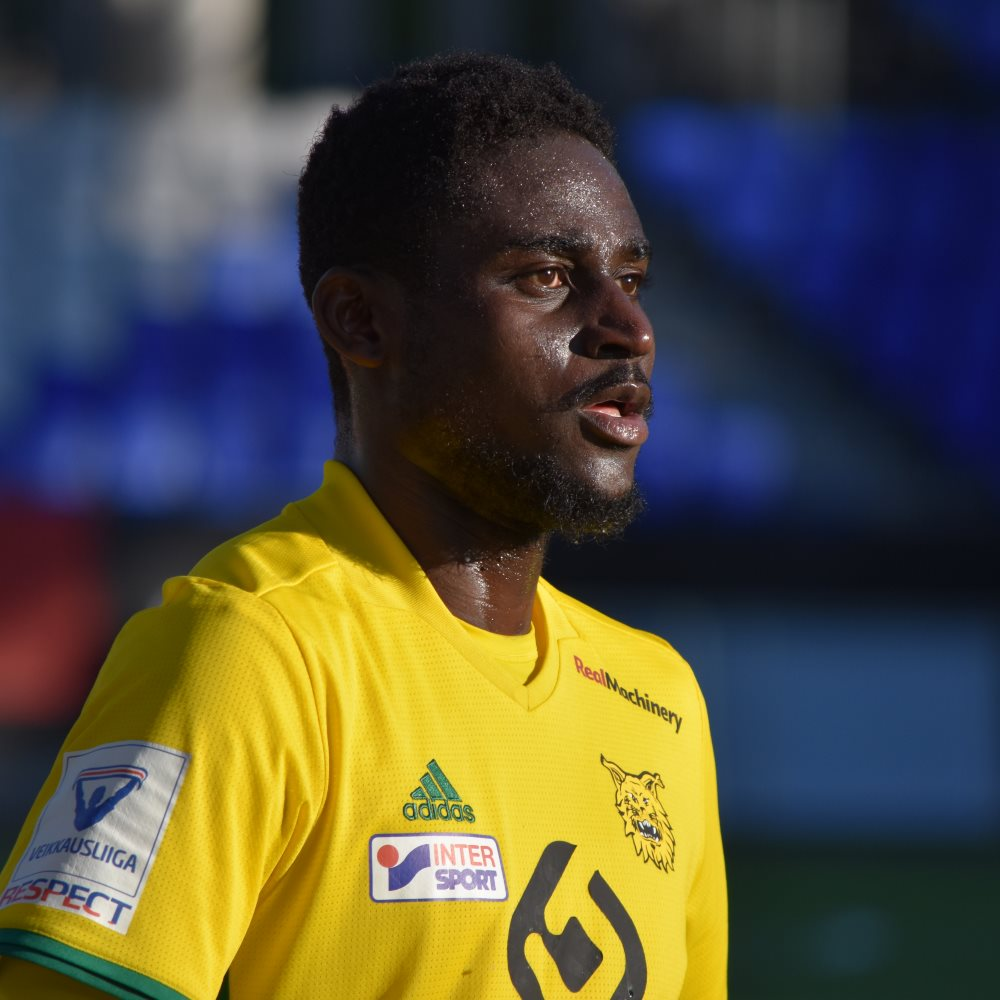
Ariel Ngueukam has played 249 matches for Lahti, SJK, Ilves, KuPS and IFK Mariehamn

- Anatole Abang – SJK – 2017
- Alain Bono – KuPS – 2011
- Alain Didier-Six – FC Jokerit – 2001
- Alain Richard Ebwelle – VPS, IFK Mariehamn, KTP – 2019–21
- **Antoin Essomba – Inter Turku** – 2025–
- Titi Essomba – AC Oulu, RoPS – 2007–08
- **Franck Ellé Essouma – KTP** – 2025–
- Gael Etock – JJK, FC Lahti – 2017, 2019
- Jacques Haman – Ilves – 2019
- Jean Marie Dongou – FC Honka – 2020–21
- Daniel Kamy – FC Inter – 2018–19
- Jean Didi Kima Beyissa – TPV – 1999
- Patrick Loa Loa – Ilves – 2021–2022
- Marcel Mahouvé – FC Inter – 2004
- **Tabi Manga** – KuPS, Ilves, **KTP** – 2018–2022, 2025–
- Alfred Mapoka – TP-47 – 2005
- Eric Matoukou – FC Inter – 2015
- Alim Moundi – Ilves, TPS – 2018, 2020
- Hassan Ndam – FC Haka – 2024
- Marc Ndikumade – TP-47 – 2005
- Sammy Ndjock – RoPS – 2020
- Serge N’Gal – FC Inter – 2004–05, 2015
- Alvaro Ngamba – IFK Mariehamn – 2022–2023
- Jean Nganbe Nganbe – AC Oulu, FC Lahti, VPS, RoPS – 2010, 2013–16
- Ariel Ngueukam – FC Lahti, SJK, Ilves, KuPS, IFK Mariehamn – 2012–17, 2019–23
- Pierre-Daniel Nguinda – KTP – 2021
- Macdonald Niba – KuPS – 2021
- Taddeus Nkeng – HJK – 2021
- Roan Nogha – AC Oulu – 2022
- Marius Noubissi – Ilves – 2017–18
- Jules Alex Nyom – RoPS – 2011
- Patrice Ollo – VPS, RoPS, KuPS – 2007–11
- Etchu Tabe – RoPS, KuPS – 2011–13

== Canada ==
- Nana Attakora – FC Haka – 2012
- Andrew Barsalona – VPS – 2014
- Hanson Boakai – FC Inter – 2019
- Tomer Chencinski – VPS, RoPS – 2011, 2015
- Michael Cox – KuPS – 2014
- Jamar Dixon – FF Jaro – 2015
- Yann Fillion – AC Oulu, IFK Mariehamn – 2021, 2022
- **Nicolas Fleuriau Chateau – VPS** – 2025–
- Tyler Hemming – Tampere United – 2008
- Frank Jonke – AC Oulu, FC Inter, FF Jaro – 2011–13
- Ben McKendry – TPS – 2018
- David Monsalve – FC Inter – 2009–10, 2016
- Riley O’Neill – MyPa – 2011–12
- Damiano Pecile – KTP – 2023
- Tosaint Ricketts – MyPa – 2009–10
- Roger Thompson – IFK Mariehamn – 2013–14
- Charlie Trafford – IFK Mariehamn, TPS, KuPS, RoPS – 2013–15, 2017
- Mason Trafford – IFK Mariehamn – 2010–12
- Jonathan Viscosi – TPS, VPS – 2018, 2023
- **Armaan Wilson – KTP** – 2025–

== Cape Verde ==
- **Hugo Cardoso – IFK Mariehamn – 2024–**
- Kristopher Da Graca – HJK, KuPS, 2023, 2024
- Willis Furtado – KTP – 2023
- Josimar Lima – FC Lahti – 2018
- **Kelvin Pires – SJK – 2024–**
- David Silva – FF Jaro – 2015
- Dylan Silva – IFK Mariehamn – 2025

== Central African Republic ==
- Sterling Yatéké – TPS – 2018

== Chad ==
- David Ramadingaye – HJK, MYPA, IFK Mariehamn, RoPS, KTP

== Chile ==
- Pablo González – RoPS – 2017
- Josepablo Monreal – SJK – 2022
- Diego Rojas – SJK – 2022–2023

== China ==
- Gao Leilei – MyPa – 2007

== Colombia ==
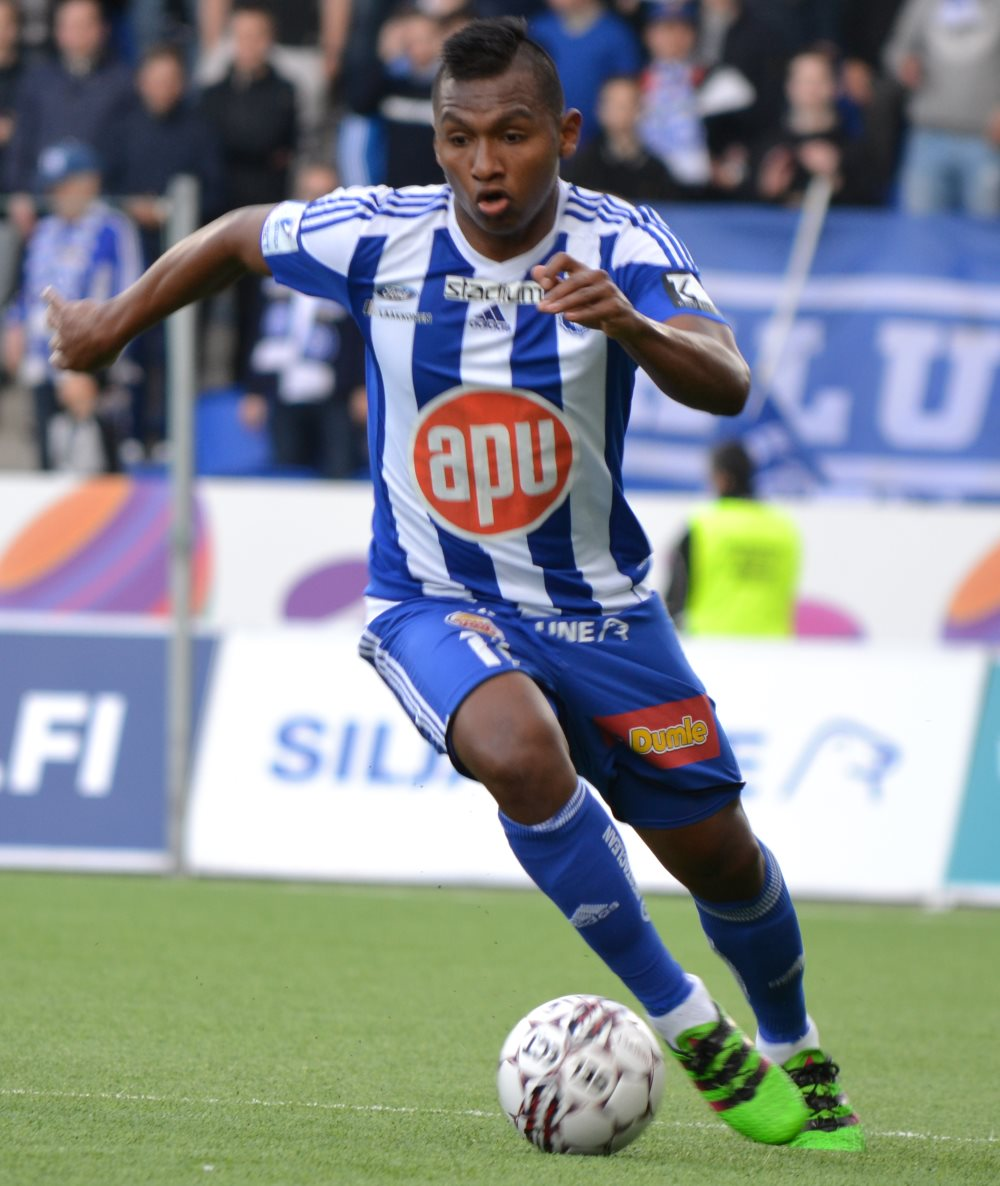
Alfredo Morelos has played 42 matches for HJK Helsinki

- Juan Algería – FC Honka – 2020–21, 2023
- Jean Carlos Blanca – Ilves – 2021
- Eliécer Espinosa – TPS – 2020
- Stiwar García – KuPS – 2018
- Julián Guevara – PS Kemi, FC Inter – 2017–18
- Aldayr Hernández – TPS, HIFK, FC Honka – 2020–2023
- Hernán Luna – Ilves – 2021
- Yessy Mena – KPV – 2019
- Alfredo Morelos – HJK – 2016–17
- Luis Carlos Murillo – KuPS, HJK, VPS – 2018–22
- Miguel Nazarit – FC Inter Turku – 2022
- William Parra – HJK – 2019
- Edwin Salazar – PS Kemi – 2017
- Róger Torres – Ilves – 2021
- Cristian Valencia – SJK, AC Oulu – 2021–2022, 2023
- Eduar Zea – PS Kemi – 2017

== Costa Rica ==
- Brian Span – IFK Mariehamn – 2015–17

== Croatia ==
- Domagoj Abramović – FC Inter – 2008, 2011
- Dražen Bagarić – FC Honka – 2022
- Andrija Bošnjak – FC Haka – 2021
- Mate Dujilo – IFK Mariehamn – 2009–10
- Dejan Godar – RoPS – 2004–05
- Igor Jovanović – TPS, FF Jaro, FC Lahti – 2009–10, 2013–14, 2017–18
- Viktor Kanižaj – FC Inter Turku – 2024
- Leon Kreković – FC Lahti – 2023
- Marin Ljubić – FC Lahti – 2023
- Ante Šimunac – IFK Mariehamn – 2009–10
- Luka Šimunović – FC Lahti – 2023
- Vinko Soldo – KuPS – 2019

== Cuba ==
- Willian Pozo-Venta – KTP – 2023

== Curaçao ==
- Angelo Cijntje – KuPS – 2001 ( (Netherlands Antilles) while active)

== Cyprus ==
- Martinos Christofi – FC Lahti – 2022
- Marios Nikolaou – FC Inter – 2016

== Czech Republic ==
- Filip Hlupik – IFK Mariehamn – 2017
- Rostislav Jerabek – FC Haka – 1993
- Miroslav Karas – FC Haka – 1993–95
- Miloslav Kufa – FC Jokerit – 2000
- David Zoubek – FC Jokerit – 2003

== Democratic Republic of Congo (Democratic Republic of the Congo) ==
- Serge Atakayi – FF Jaro, SJK Seinäjoki – 2015, 2019–20, 2022
- Wilson Kamavuaka – HIFK – 2022

== Denmark ==
- Lars Andersen – Finnairin Palloilijat – 1996
- Christian Andreasen – TPS – 2009
- Mads Borchers – VPS – 2024–2025
- Lars Dalsborg – TPS – 1992
- Klaus Granlund – HJK – 1990
- Riffi Haddaoui – Finnairin Palloilijat, PK-35 – 1996, 1998
- Tammy Haddaoui – Finnairin Palloilijat – 1996
- Morten Jörgensen – TP-Seinäjoki – 1997
- Kenneth Knudsen – IFK Mariehamn – 2007
- Leif Nielsen – Finnairin Palloilijat – 1996
- Allan Olesen – IFK Mariehamn – 2011
- Simon Azoulay Pedersen – TPS – 2008
- **Marcus Ryberg – Gnistan** – 2025–
- Christian Tue Jensen – KuPS – 2022–2023
- Michael Törnes – HJK – 2014

== Dominican Republic ==
- Luiyi de Lucas – FC Haka – 2020–22

== Ecuador ==
- Norberto Araujo – TPS – 1996
- Jhon Cagua – FC Haka – 2009
- Mateo Ortíz – FC Honka – 2023

== Egypt ==
- Sherif Ashraf – HJK, FF Jaro – 2012
- Adel Eid – HJK – 2005
- Amr Gamal – HJK – 2018
- Elsaid Maher – HIFK – 2019
- Abdallah Said – KuPS – 2018
- Omar Rabie Yassin – RoPS – 2011

== El Salvador ==
- Víctor Merino – FC Jazz – 1999–2001
- Víctor Turcios – RoPS – 2013

== England ==
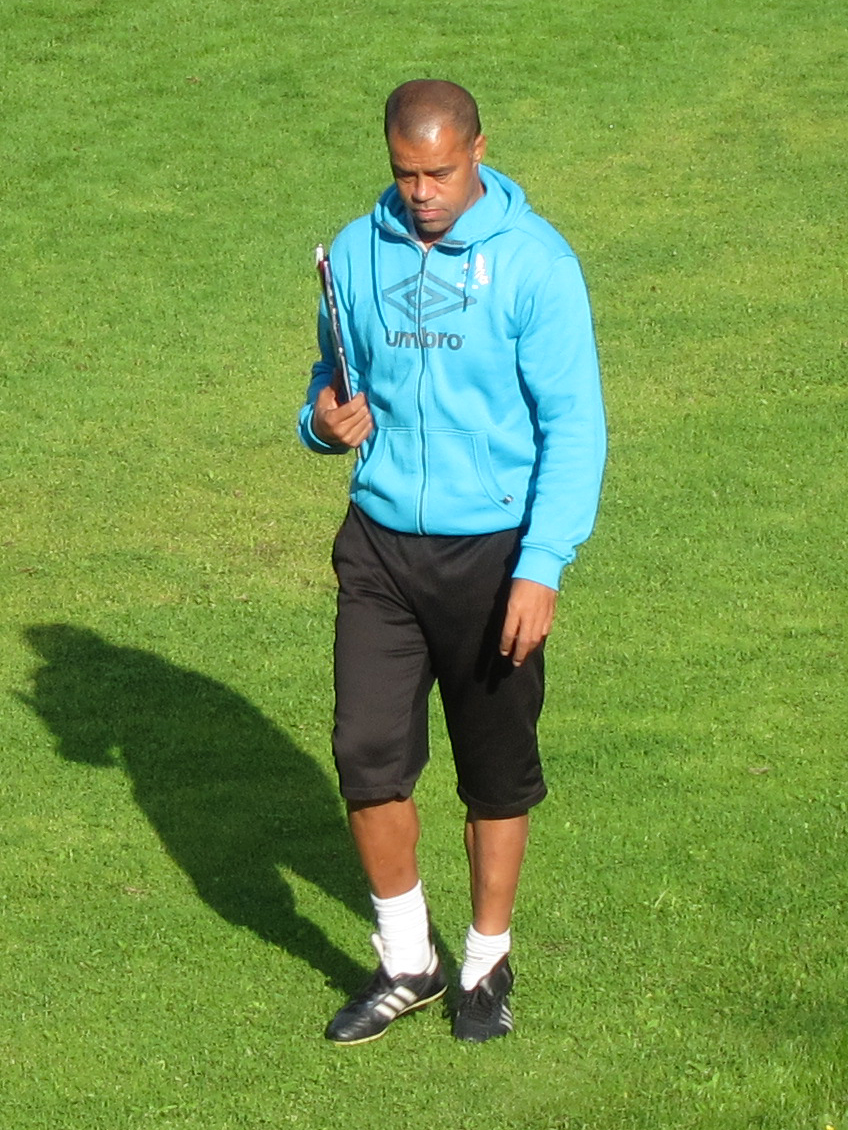
Steven Polack has played 183 matches for RoPS and Inter Turku

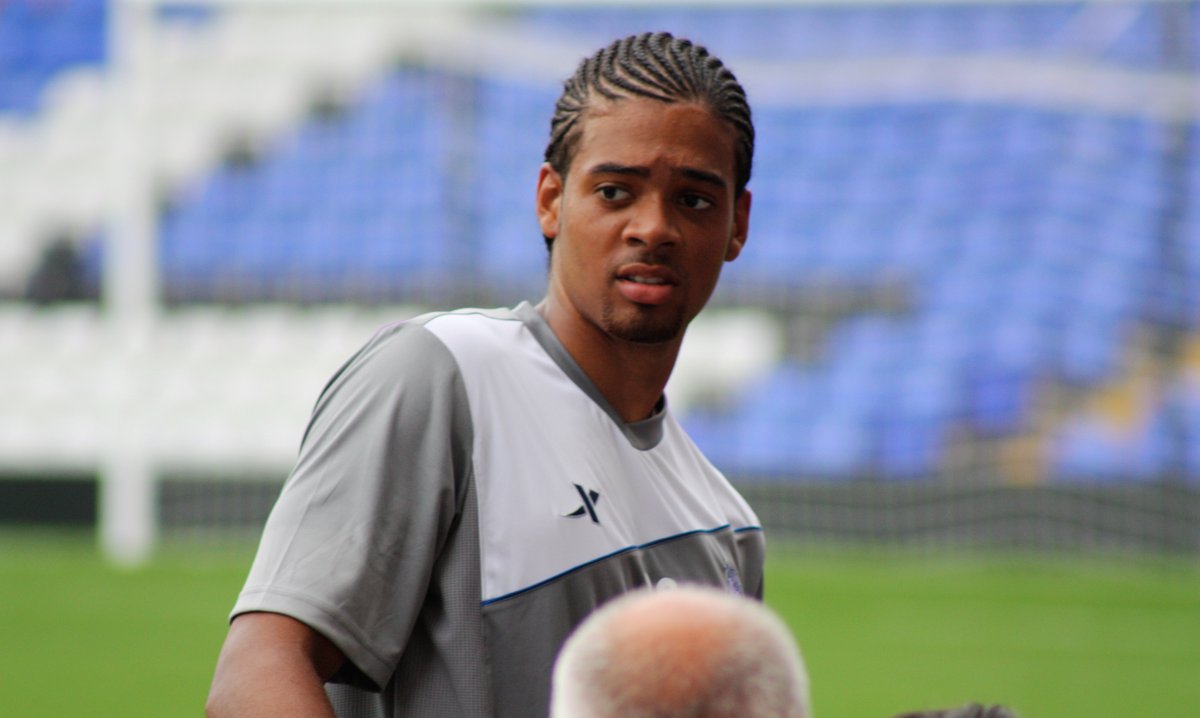
Jake Jervis has played 64 matches for SJK Seinäjoki and KuPS

- **James Akintunde – FC Haka** – 2025–
- Tomi Ameobi – VPS – 2013
- Hakeem Araba – PS Kemi – 2018
- Gavin Bailey – Mikkelin Palloilijat – 1996
- Alfie Bates – SJK Seinäjoki – 2022
- Stewart Beards – RoPS, TPS – 1991–94
- Scott Beeks - IFK Mariehamn
- Michael Belfield – Lahden Reipas, FC Kuusysi, FC Haka, PK-35 – 1990–95, 1998
- Scott Boden – IFK Mariehamn – 2008
- Alex Brister – FC Honka – 2014
- Jordaan Brown – VPS – 2014
- Wayne Brown – TPS, SJK – 2009, 2013–15
- Matt Carmichael – TPS – 1996
- **Alfie Cicale – VPS – 2024–**
- Chris Cleaver – FF Jaro, AC Allianssi, TPS – 2002–05, 2007–10
- Ashley Coffey – AC Oulu – 2023–2024
- Philip Daley – TPS – 1996
- Craig Dean – TP-47 – 2005
- Darrell Duffy – MyPa – 1993
- Malcolm Dunkley – RoPS – 1990
- Stuart Douglas – RoPS – 2004
- Mark Dziadulewicz – Ilves, FC Oulu – 1990–92
- Jordan Eagers – IFK Mariehamn – 2008
- Ovie Ejeheri – SJK Seinäjoki – 2023
- David Elliot – KPV, FF Jaro, RoPS – 1990, 1992–96
- Derek Fazackerley – Kuusankosken Kumu – 1990
- Ryan Gilligan – Kemi Kings – 2016
- Neville Gordon – HJK – 1996
- Marlon Harewood – FC Haka – 1998
- **Shayon Harrison – AC Oulu** – 2025–
- Robert Haworth – TPS – 1996
- Jamie Hopcutt – IFK Mariehamn – 2022–2023
- Gary Hyde – Kuusankosken Kumu – 1990
- Billy Ions – Kemi Kings, SJK – 2016–20
- Steven Irwin – FF Jaro – 2012
- Lee Isaac – FC Inter – 1996–97, 1999
- Darren Jackson – MyPa – 1996
- Jake Jervis – SJK – 2020–2022
- Imani Lanquedoc – FC Haka – 2024
- George Lawrence – Mikkelin Palloilijat – 1992
- Christopher Lee – RoPS – 1996
- Andrew Lewis – KTP – 2015
- **Brooklyn Lyons-Foster – HJK – 2024–**
- Rob Milsom – TPS – 2010
- Josh Mulvany – KTP – 2015
- Jordan Mustoe – SJK – 2018
- David Moore – MyPa, TPV – 1996, 1999
- Mark Nangle – TP-Seinäjoki – 1997
- Jake Nicholson – MyPa – 2011
- Alex Nimely – FC Honka – 2018
- **Ayo Obileye – SJK Seinäjoki** – 2025–
- Danny O’Brien – SJK – 2018
- Liam O’Neil – VPS – 2012
- **Oludare Olufunwa – IF Gnistan** – 2025–
- Kudus Oyenuga – MyPa – 2011
- Kyle Patterson – TP-47 – 2005
- Luke Plange – HJK – 2024–
- Steven Polack – RoPS, FC Inter – 1990–94, 1996–97
- Owen Price – TPS – 2007
- Darren Purse – IFK Mariehamn – 2013
- **Jayden Reid** – **IFK Mariehamn** – 2024–
- **Tyler Reid – VPS** – 2022–23
- Connor Ruane – FC Inter – 2019–20
- Mark Salmon – RoPS – 1996
- Kaine Sheppard – SJK – 2017
- Anton Smith – TP-47 – 2005
- Gus Sow – FC Honka – 2014
- Paul Taylor – KuPS – 1994
- Paul Tisdale – Finnairin Palloilijat – 1998
- Calum Ward – HIFK, AC Oulu – 2021, 2022–2024
- Kevin Ward – Mikkelin Palloilijat – 1996
- Kim Wassell – HJK – 1995
- Ben Webster – MyPa – 2009
- Jason White – KPV – 1990
- David Wilson – RoPS, FC Haka, HJK – 1993, 1999–2002

== Equatorial Guinea ==
- José Elo – AC Oulu – 2024
- Baba Issaka – FC Jokerit – 2001

== Estonia ==
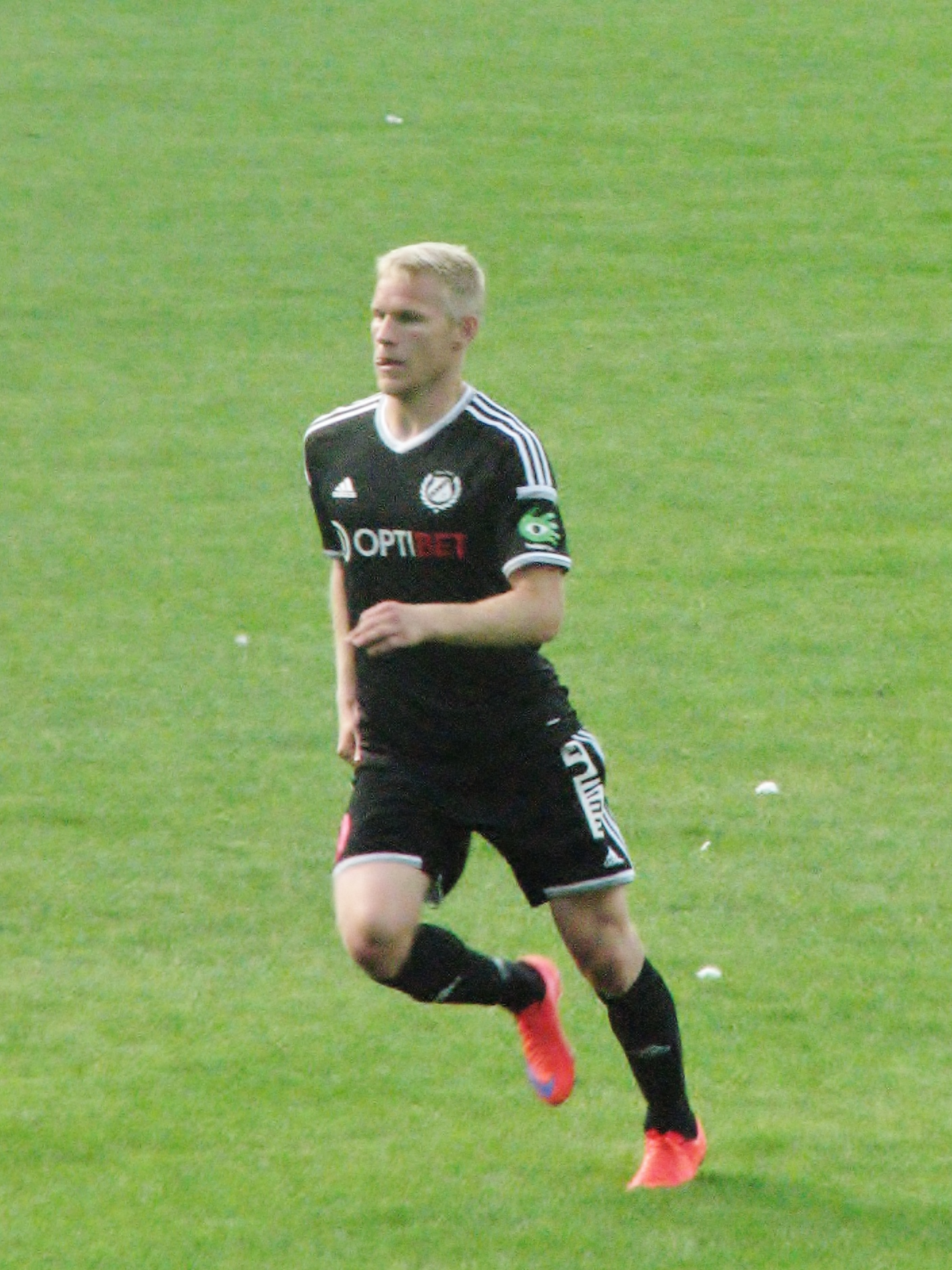
Ats Purje has played 209 matches for Inter Turku and KuPS

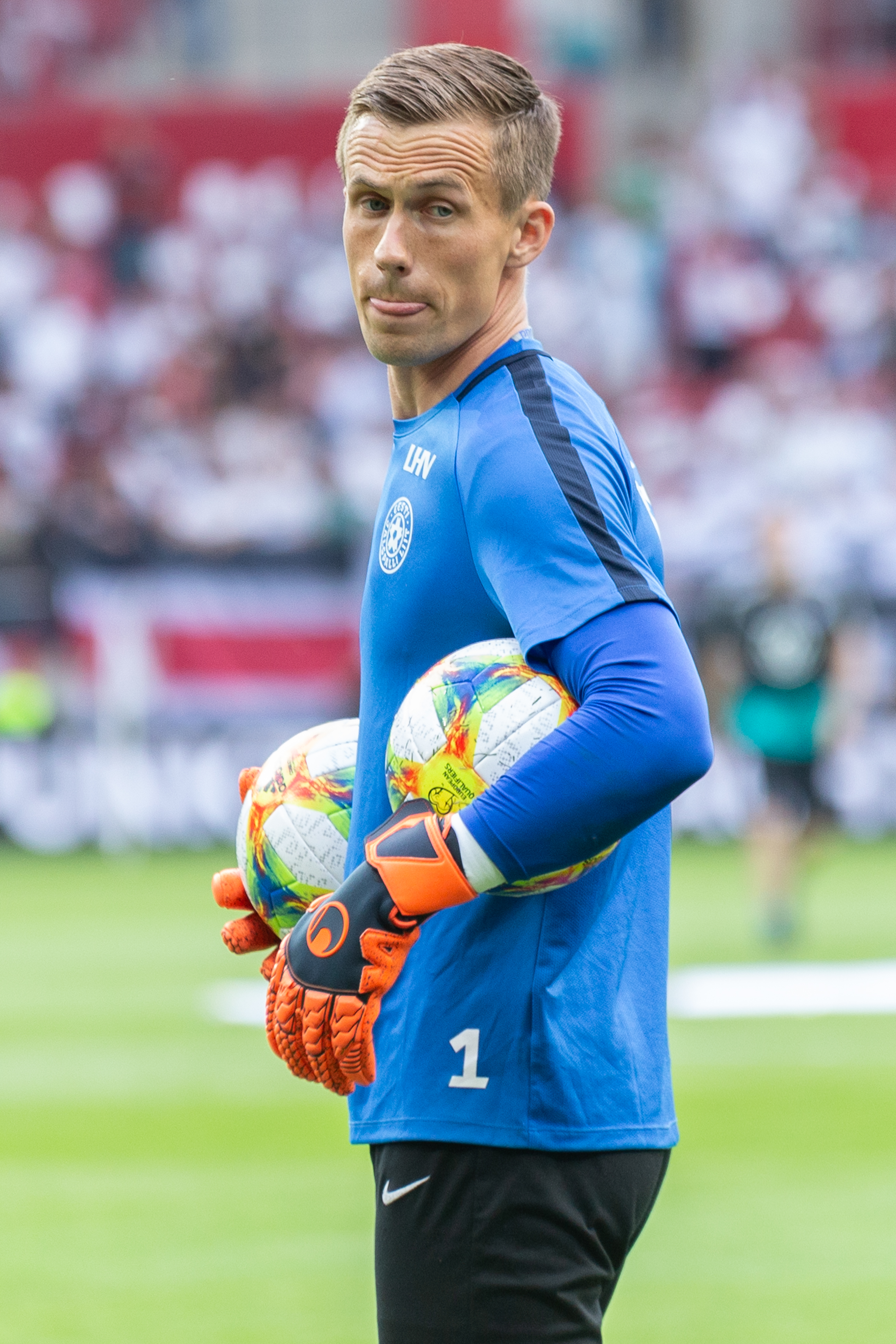
Mihkel Aksalu has played 158 matches for SJK Seinäjoki

- Mihkel Aksalu – SJK – 2014–19
- Henri Anier – FC Lahti – 2017–18
- Argo Arbeiter – KTP – 1999–2000
- Andrei Borissov – FF Jaro – 1998
- Artjom Dmitrijev – FC Lahti – 2018
- Trevor Elhi – SJK – 2019
- Maksim Gussev – KPV – 2019
- Markus Jürgenson – VPS – 2017
- Urmas Kaljend – Ilves – 1993
- Marek Kaljumäe – PS Kemi – 2017–18
- Toomas Kallaste – FF Jaro, KTP – 1999–2000
- Gert Kams – SJK – 2014
- Kevin Kauber – TPS – 2014
- Tarmo Kink – SJK – 2016
- Urmas Kirs – KTP – 1999–2000
- Artur Kotenko – FF Jaro – 2012
- Marko Kristal – FC Lahti – 2000
- Toomas Krõm – FF Jaro – 1998
- Aleksandr Kulik – RoPS – 2008
- Kert Kütt – FC Haka – 2012
- Liivo Leetma – KTP – 2005–06
- Brent Lepistu – FC Lahti – 2019
- Meelis Lindmaa – TPV, KTP – 1999
- Maksim Lipin – PS Kemi – 2018
- Marko Meerits – VPS – 2017–18
- Sergei Mosnikov – PS Kemi – 2017
- Konstantin Nahk – FC Jokerit – 2003
- Tarmo Neemelo – MyPa – 2008
- Raivo Nõmmik – MyPa – 1998
- Jevgeni Novikov – FF Jaro – 2010
- Henrik Ojamaa – RoPS – 2011
- Hindrek Ojamaa – JJK, VPS – 2017–19
- Maido Pakk – FC Haka – 2009
- Kevor Palumets – HJK Helsinki – 2024
- Artur Pikk – KuPS – 2020
- Mart Poom – KuPS – 1992
- Albert Prosa – RoPS, TPS – 2016, 2018
- Sander Puri – KuPS – 2012
- Ats Purje – FC Inter, KuPS – 2008–09, 2012–14, 2017–20
- Taavi Rähn – FF Jaro – 2013
- Lembit Rajala – KTP – 1999
- Martin Reim – KTP – 1999–2000
- Mikk Reintam – JJK – 2011–13
- Urmas Rooba – TPS, FF Jaro – 2007–09
- Vitali Teles – FF Jaro – 2009–11
- Sergei Terehhov – FC Haka, FC Honka – 2002–04, 2006
- Andreas Vaikla – IFK Mariehamn – 2017
- Vjatšeslav Zahovaiko – KuPS – 2012
- Indrek Zelinski – FC Lahti – 2000

== Ethiopia ==
- Fikru Tefera – KuPS – 2011

== Faroe Islands ==
- **Samuel Chukwudi – SJK Seinäjoki** – 2025–

== France ==
- Plaisir Bahamboula – MyPa – 2013
- Richard Barroilhet – VPS – 2011
- David Bitsindou – Kemi Kings – 2016
- Olivier Boumelaha – IFK Mariehamn – 2005
- Virgile Boumelaha – HJK – 2005
- Jean-Christophe Coubronne – FC Lahti, IFK Mariehamn – 2019–23
- **Jean-Pierre Da Sylva – FC Haka** – 2025–
- Bradley Diallo – SJK Seinäjoki – 2022
- Hamed Dramé – AC Oulu – 2023
- **Yassine El Ouatki – VPS** – 2025–
- **Lamine Ghezali – AC Oulu** – 2025–
- Guy Gnabouyou – FC Inter – 2011–13, 2015–17
- Boussad Houche – IFK Mariehamn – 2010
- Dimitry Imbongo – FC Lahti – 2020
- Abdoulaye Kanté – Ilves, Ekenäs IF – 2024
- Guy Moussi – HJK – 2015
- Hayk Musakhanyan – Haka – 2023
- Aly Ndom – IFK Mariehamn – 2023
- Armand Oné – TPS – 2007–08
- Jordan Sebban – KuPS – 2021
- Mohamadou Sissoko – RoPS, KTP – 2019, 2021
- Jean-Felix Somay – PS Kemi – 2018
- Noam Surrier – FC Lahti – 2004

== Gabon ==
- Gaëtan Missi Mezu – Ilves – 2020

== Gambia (The Gambia) ==
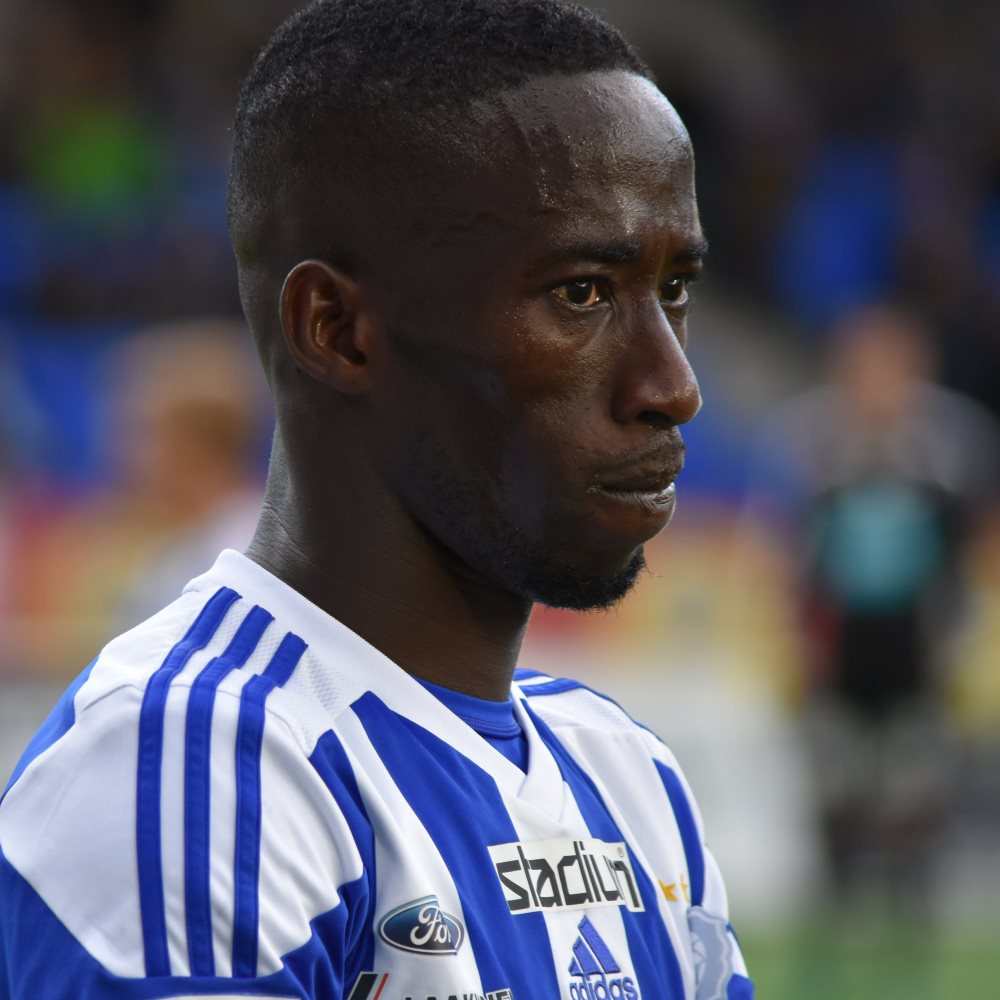
Demba Savage played 280 matches for Honka and HJK

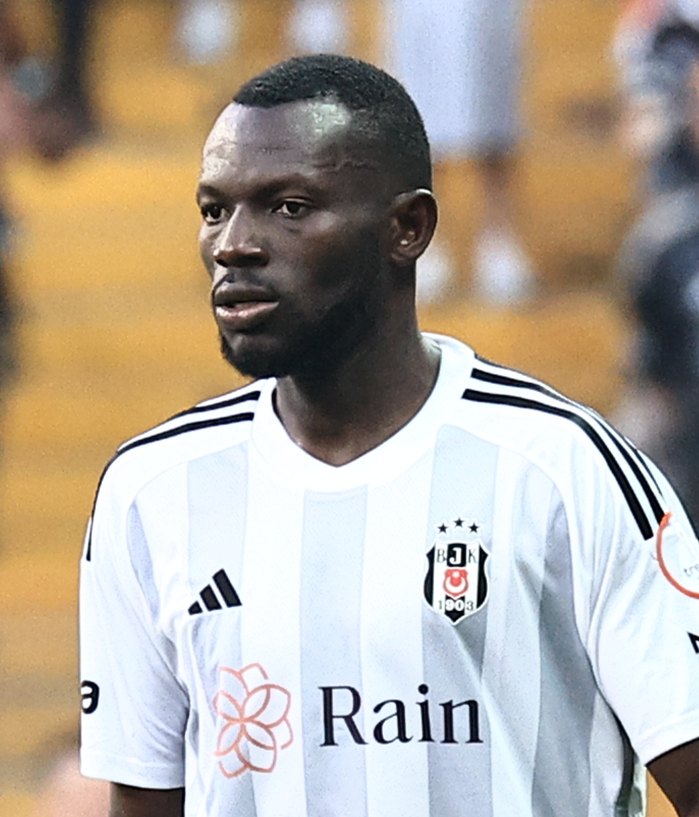
Omar Colley has played 58 matches for KuPS

- Dawda Bah – HJK, KuPS, MyPa – 2007–11, 2013–14
- Momodou Bojang – SJK Seinäjoki – 2024–2025
- Momodou Ceesay – PS Kemi – 2017
- Omar Colley – KuPS – 2013–14
- Abdoulie Corr – VPS – 2011
- **Momodou Fadera – AC Oulu** – 2025–
- Saihou Jagne – IFK Mariehamn – 2012
- Tijan Jaiteh – KuPS – 2016
- Modou Jallow – AC Oulu – 2007
- Ousman Jallow – HJK – 2015–17
- Abdou Jammeh – RoPS – 2015–16
- **Musa Jatta** – **AC Oulu** – 2024–
- Foday Manneh – HIFK – 2019–20
- Abdoulie Mansally – PS Kemi, FC Inter – 2017–18
- **Emmanuel Mendy – Jaro** – 2025–
- Sainey Nyassi – RoPS – 2014
- Mamut Saine – RoPS – 2016
- Lamin Samateh – KuPS – 2014
- Cherno Samba – FC Haka – 2008
- Demba Savage – FC Honka, HJK – 2008–15, 2017–21
- Ebrima Sohna – KuPS, VPS – 2012, 2014–15, 2017

== Georgia (Georgia (country)) ==
- Zakaria Beglarishvili – SJK – 2019
- Giorgi Khidasheli – FF Jaro – 2011
- Giorgi Nikuradze – KTP – 2004–05
- Giorgi Ositashvili – KTP – 2015
- Nika Sichinava – KuPS – 2022
- Irakli Sirbiladze – FF Jaro, FC Inter, KuPS – 2011–15
- Gocha Tkebuchava – Ilves – 1992–93 ( (Commonwealth of Independent States) when active)
- Zurab Tsiskaridze – RoPS – 2020

== Germany ==
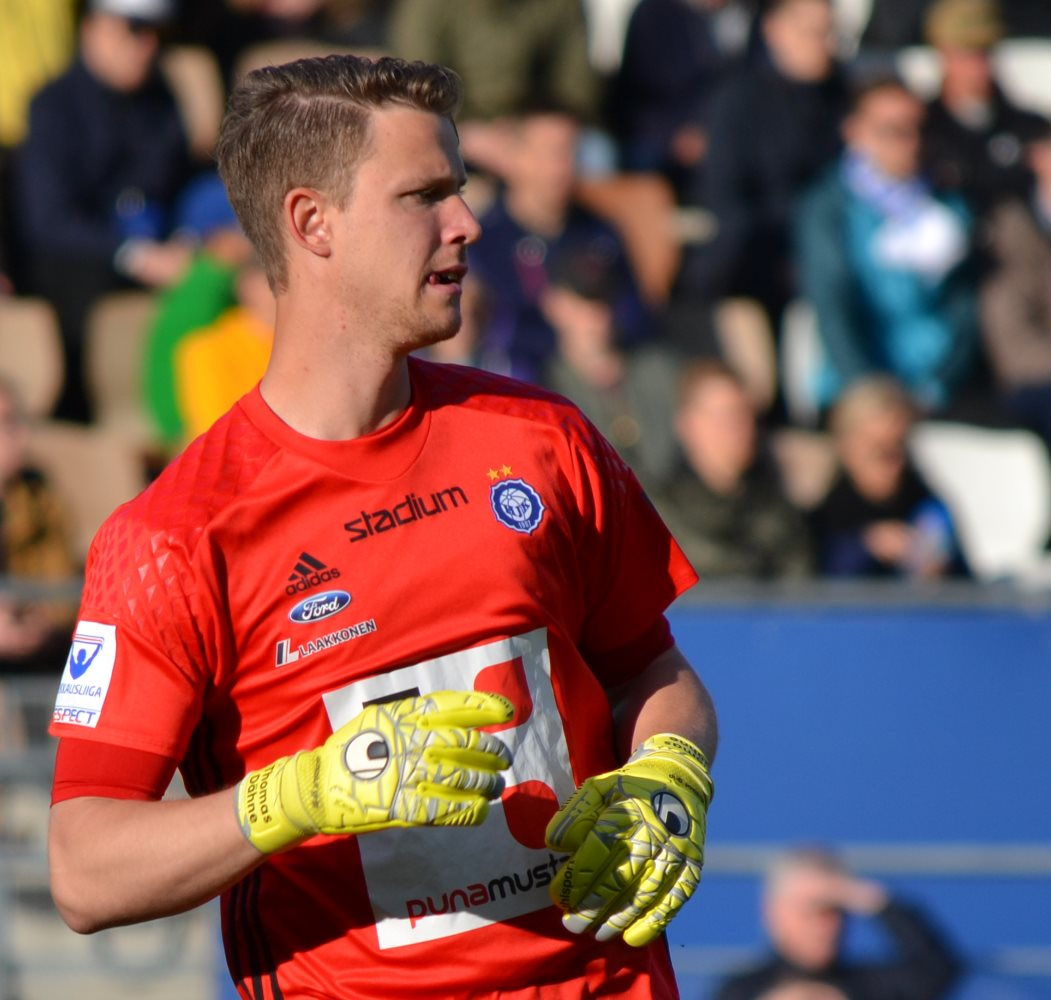
Thomas Dähne played 56 matches for HJK Helsinki

- Berkan Algan – FC Haka – 2001
- David Azin – FF Jaro – 2013
- Florian Baak – FC Honka – 2022–23
- Daniel Bauer – RoPS – 2008
- Thomas Dähne – HJK – 2015–17
- Anouar El Moukhantir – FC Lahti – 2023
- Hendrik Großöhmichen – FC Lahti – 2012
- Tillmann Grove – FF Jaro – 2009–11
- Sasko Gulewski – FC Kuusysi – 2005
- Hendrik Helmke – IFK Mariehamn, FF Jaro, KPV – 2011, 2013–14, 2017–19
- Martin Kompalla – VPS, RoPS – 2019–20
- **Florian Krebs** – FC Honka, **FC Inter Turku** – 2022–23, 2024–
- Adrian Pelka – RoPS – 2005
- Patrick Rakovsky – FC Lahti – 2019–20
- Johannes Wurtz – FC Honka – 2023

== Ghana ==
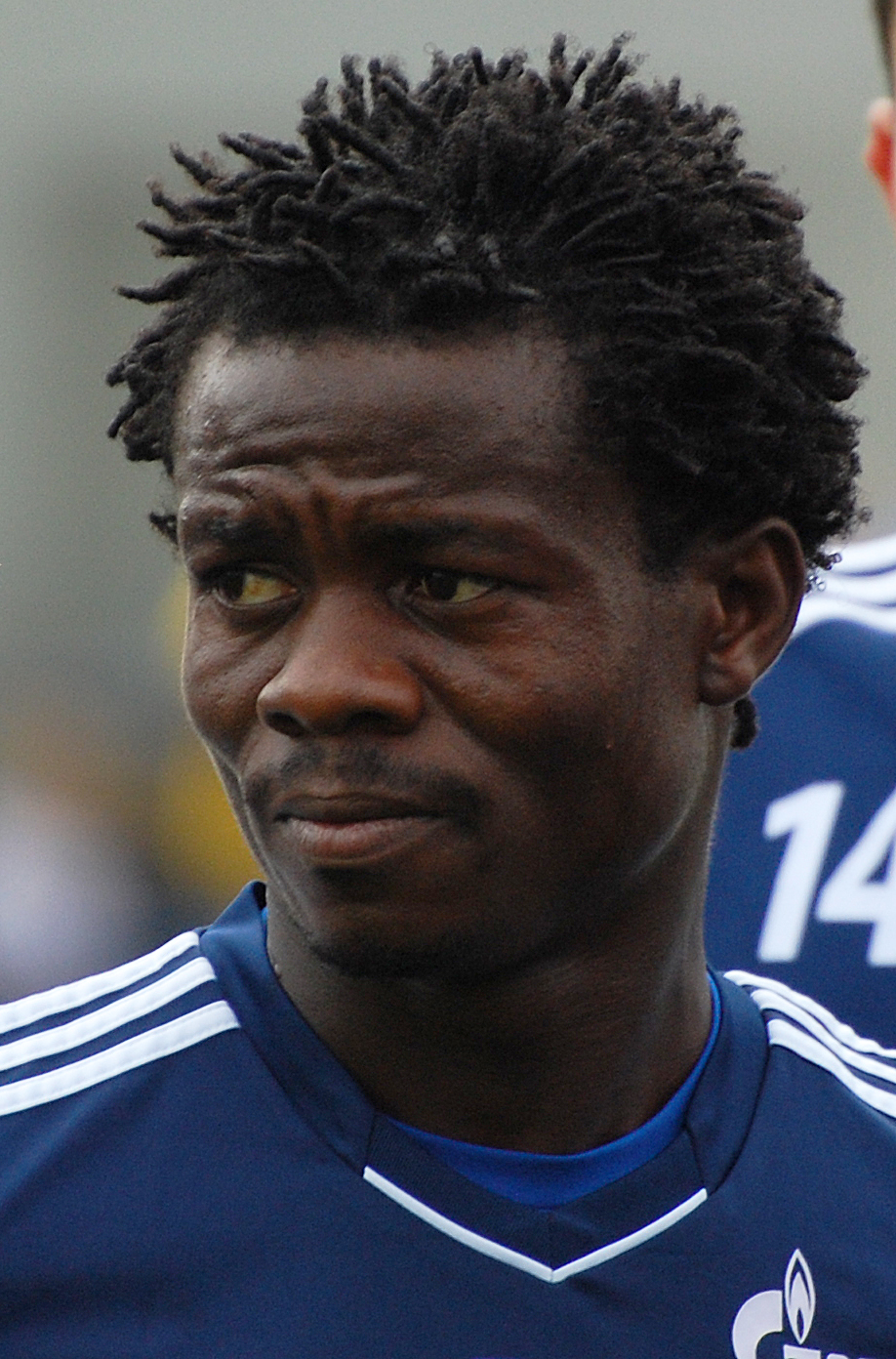
Anthony Annan played 121 matches for HJK Helsinki and Inter Turku

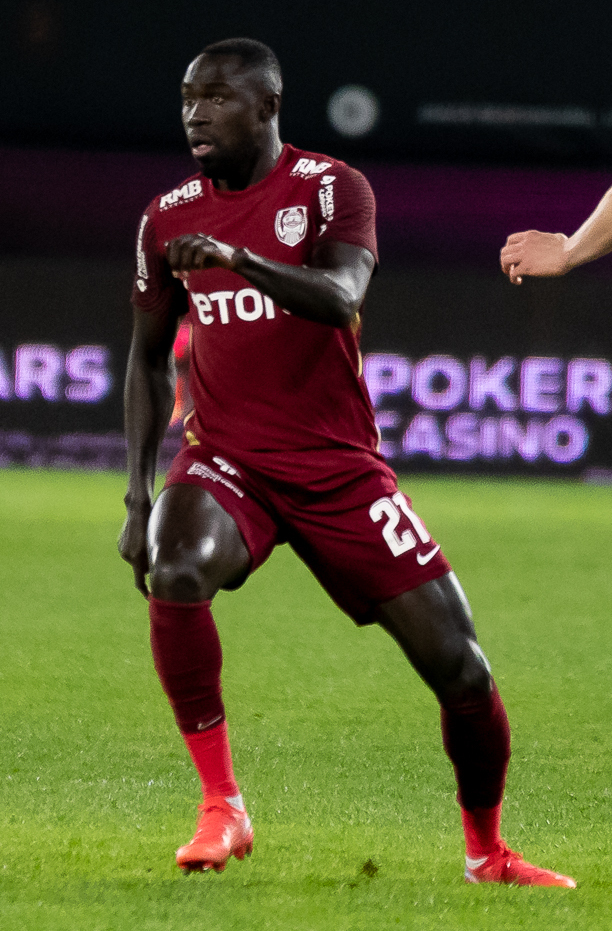
Nana Boateng has played 34 matches for KuPS

- Sulley Abdallah – TPV – 1999
- Seth Ablade – KuPS – 2005–06
- Malik Abubakari – HJK – 2022
- Mohammed Abubakari – IFK Mariehamn – 2021
- David Accam – FC Inter Turku – 2022
- Mohammed Adams – FC Honka – 2022
- David Addy – Ilves – 2019
- Samuel Afum – Ilves – 2019
- David Agbo – FC Inter Turku, Gnistan – 2023, 2024
- Thomas Agyiri – TPS, Ilves, KTP – 2013–14, 2017, 2021
- **Prosper Ahiabu** – **VPS** – 2022–
- **Bismark Ampofo – FC Inter Turku – 2023–**
- **Edmund Arko-Mensah** – FC Honka, **IF Gnistan** – 2020–2023, 2025–
- Masahudu Alhassan – TPS – 2020
- Felix Ankamah – KooTeePee – 2004
- Anthony Annan – HJK, FC Inter – 2014, 2016–18, 2019–21
- **Clinton Antwi** – **KuPS** – 2022–
- **Bob Nii Armah – KuPS** – 2025–
- Jude Arthur – SJK, FC Haka – 2019–2022
- Isaac Atanga – Ilves – 2024
- **Derrick Atta Agyei – KuPS** – 2025–
- Reuben Ayarna – Ilves, SJK, KuPS – 2016–19
- Gideon Baah – FC Honka, HJK – 2013–15, 2019
- Nasiru Banahene – FC Honka – 2019–2023
- **Eric Danso Boateng – KuPS** – 2025–
- Nana Boateng – KuPS – 2020–21
- Sampson Cudjoe – FC Honka – 2008
- David Davidson – KTP – 2007
- Glenn Gabriel – RoPS – 2017
- Richard Gadze – HJK – 2016
- Kingsley Gyamfi – Ekenäs IF – 2024
- Christian Gyan – TPS – 2008
- Raymond Gyasi – RoPS – 2020
- Baba Haruna – FC Honka – 2023
- Enoch Kofi Adu – Ekenäs IF – 2024
- Baba Mensah – Ilves, IFK Mariehamn, VPS – 2017–20, 2022, 2023
- Evans Mensah – HJK – 2016–19
- Michael Mensah – FC Jokerit, MyPa – 2003–04
- Nasiru Mohammed – Ekenäs IF – 2024
- Musah Nuhu – KuPS – 2022
- **Brian Oddei – KTP** – 2025–
- Kingsley Ofori – SJK – 2022–23
- **Abraham Okyere – FC Haka** – 2025–
- David Opoku – MyPa – 2012
- Ransford Osei – RoPS – 2016
- Quincy Osei – FC Haka – 2010
- Eric Oteng – Ilves – 2021–2022
- Frank Owusu – Ekenäs IF – 2024
- Seth Paintsil – FF Jaro – 2015
- **Robin Polley – FF Jaro** – 2025–
- Nunoo Sarpei – HJK – 2024
- **Shadirac Shyreme Say – AC Oulu** – 2025–
- **Sadat Seidu – KuPS** – 2025–
- Isaac Shaze – KPV – 2019
- Usman Suleman – IFK Mariehamn – 2023
- Mohammed Umar – Ilves – 2023–2024
- Ishmael Yartey – KPV, FC Haka – 2019, 2021
- Terry Yegbe – SJK – 2023
- **Salim Yussif – SJK Seinäjoki** – 2024–

== Greece ==
- **Georgios Antzoulas – HJK** – 2024–
- Nikos Giannakopoulos – Ekenäs IF – 2024
- Petros Kanakoudis – Inter Turku – 2015–17
- **Georgios Kanellopoulos – HJK** – 2023–
- Konstantinos Kotsopoulos – IFK Mariehamn – 2023
- Georgios Manthatis – KTP – 2023
- Dimitrios Metaxas – AC Oulu – 2024
- Konstantinos Stavrothanasopoulos – VPS – 2019
- Stavros Zarokostas – FC Haka – 2022–2023

== Grenada ==
- Alex McQueen – VPS – 2018

== Guinea ==
- Demba Camara – FC Inter – 2013–15
- Sekou Camara – HJK – 2019
- **Kerfala Cissoko – FF Jaro** – 2025–
- Mohamed Fofana – MyPa, FC Lahti – 2006–10
- **Pa Konate – KuPS** – 2025–
- **Mohamed Toure – KuPS** – 2025–

== Guinea-Bissau ==
- **Adramane Cassamá – AC Oulu** – 2025–
- **Babacar Fati – SJK Seinäjoki – 2022–**
- **Pedro Justiniano – VPS – 2024–**
- Kaby – PS Kemi – 2016
- Fromose Mendy – HJK Helsinki – 2015

== Guyana ==
- Trayon Bobb – RoPS – 2013
- Walter Moore – FF Jaro – 2015

== Haiti ==
- Jems Geffrard – RoPS – 2018
- Regillio Nooitmeer – FC Haka – 2010–11

== Honduras ==
- **Alenis Vargas – SJK Seinäjoki** – 2025

== Hong Kong ==
- David Williamson – TP-47 – 2005

== Hungary ==
- Gábor Árki – Mikkelin Palloilijat – 1994, 1996
- Balázs Balogh – KuPS – 2009–11
- Gábor Bardi – FC Lahti – 2002
- Ferenc Bene – FC Jazz – 2000
- Bertalan Bicskei – TPV – 1999
- Levente Bozsik – KTP – 2003
- Krisztián Budovinszky – FC Haka – 2000
- Sándor Csató – Mikkelin Palloilijat – 1993
- Zoltán Czipó – Atlantis FC, AC Allianssi – 2001–03
- Gyula Dobesch – Ilves – 1992
- László Emmer – FC Jazz – 1991
- György Fabulya – Mikkelin Palloilijat – 1994
- László Fekete – HJK, RoPS – 2001–04
- Zsolt Grezsák – TPV – 1999
- Tamás Gruborovics – KuPS, KTP, IFK Mariehamn, JJK, FC Inter – 2005–06, 2008–15
- Tibor Gruborovics – Mikkelin Palloilijat – 1990–95
- Sándor Halász – TPV – 1999
- István Hámori – FC Lahti – 2000–02
- Atilla Herédi – FC Haka – 1990
- Sándor Jenei – HJK – 1993
- Tibor Kalina – FC Haka – 1998
- György Katona – FC Haka – 1990–94
- György Kajdy – TPS, Mikkelin Palloilijat – 1991–92, 1994
- István Kasza – FC Lahti – 2000
- Norbert Kerényi – RoPS – 2004
- Béla Kovács – VPS – 2002
- Péter Kovács – FC Lahti, FC Haka – 1999–2002
- Antal Lőrincz – FC Jazz – 1999
- Sándor Matus – KTP – 1999
- László Medgyesi – FC Lahti – 2001
- István Mitring – MyPa, KuPS – 1999–2003, 2005
- József Nyikos – FC Lahti – 2000
- József Ördög – FC Jazz – 2000
- László Pálfi – MyPa – 2001–02
- Zsolt Petry – KTP – 2000
- Attila Plókai – Tampere United – 2000
- Róbert Rácz – AC Allianssi – 2003
- László Répási – TPV – 1999
- Lajos Schróth – FC Haka – 1992
- Antal Simon – FC Lahti, TPV – 1999
- Viktor Szentpéteri – FC Lahti, KuPS – 2008–09, 2012–13
- Mihály Szeróvay – JJK, FC Haka – 2009–10, 2012
- Gábor Szilágyi – FC Jokerit, HJK, KTP, TPS – 2000–01, 2003–06
- István Tarlósi – FC Hämeenlinna – 2002–04
- Krisztián Timár – FC Jokerit – 2003
- Tamás Udvari – MyPa – 2000
- Ernő Varga – FC Hämeenlinna – 2002–04
- András Vilnrotter-Babócsy – FC Haka, HJK – 1998–2004

== Iraq ==
- André Alsanati – AC Oulu – 2024

== Ireland (Republic of Ireland) ==
- Travis Binnion – IFK Mariehamn – 2008
- Shane McFaul – FC Haka, KTP – 2012, 2015
- **Josh Okpolokpo – SJK Seinäjoki** – 2025–
- Shane Robinson – FC Haka – 2011–12

== Italy ==
- Giuseppe Funicello – IFK Mariehamn, VPS, FF Jaro – 2010–11, 2013
- Alessandro Marzuoli – VPS – 2010
- Marco Privitera – VPS – 2018

== Ivory Coast ==
- Yann Emmanuel Affi – AC Oulu – 2023
- Oussou Konan Anicet – HJK – 2014
- Charles Bantanga – VPS – 2015
- Jean-Jacques Bougouhi – HJK – 2017
- **Ibrahim Cissé** (1999) – **KuPS – 2023–**
- Ibrahim Cissé (2003) – SJK – 2023
- Hamed Coulibaly – KuPS, IFK Mariehamn – 2015, 2017–18
- Adama Fofana – HIFK – 2020
- Tiemoko Fofana – Ilves, Haka, Ekenäs IF – 2018–20, 2023, 2024
- Vigori Gbe – Ilves, FC Haka – 2021–2022
- Cédric Gogoua – SJK – 2014–15
- Alain Guei – Inter Turku – 2025
- Didier Kadio – FF Jaro, SJK – 2015, 2018–19
- Wilfried Kanon – HIFK – 2022
- **Dimitri Legbo – FC Inter Turku – 2023–**
- Koffi Roméo Konan – MyPa – 2007
- Mamadou Konate – AC Oulu – 2007
- **Axel Kouame – FC Inter Turku – 2023–**
- Abdoulaye Méïté – FC Honka, SJK – 2013, 2016
- **Muhamed Tehe Olawale** – TPS, **IFK Mariehamn** – 2020–21, 2022–
- **Anicet Oura – IF Gnistan** – 2025–
- Zézéto – FF Jaro – 2010–11

== Jamaica ==
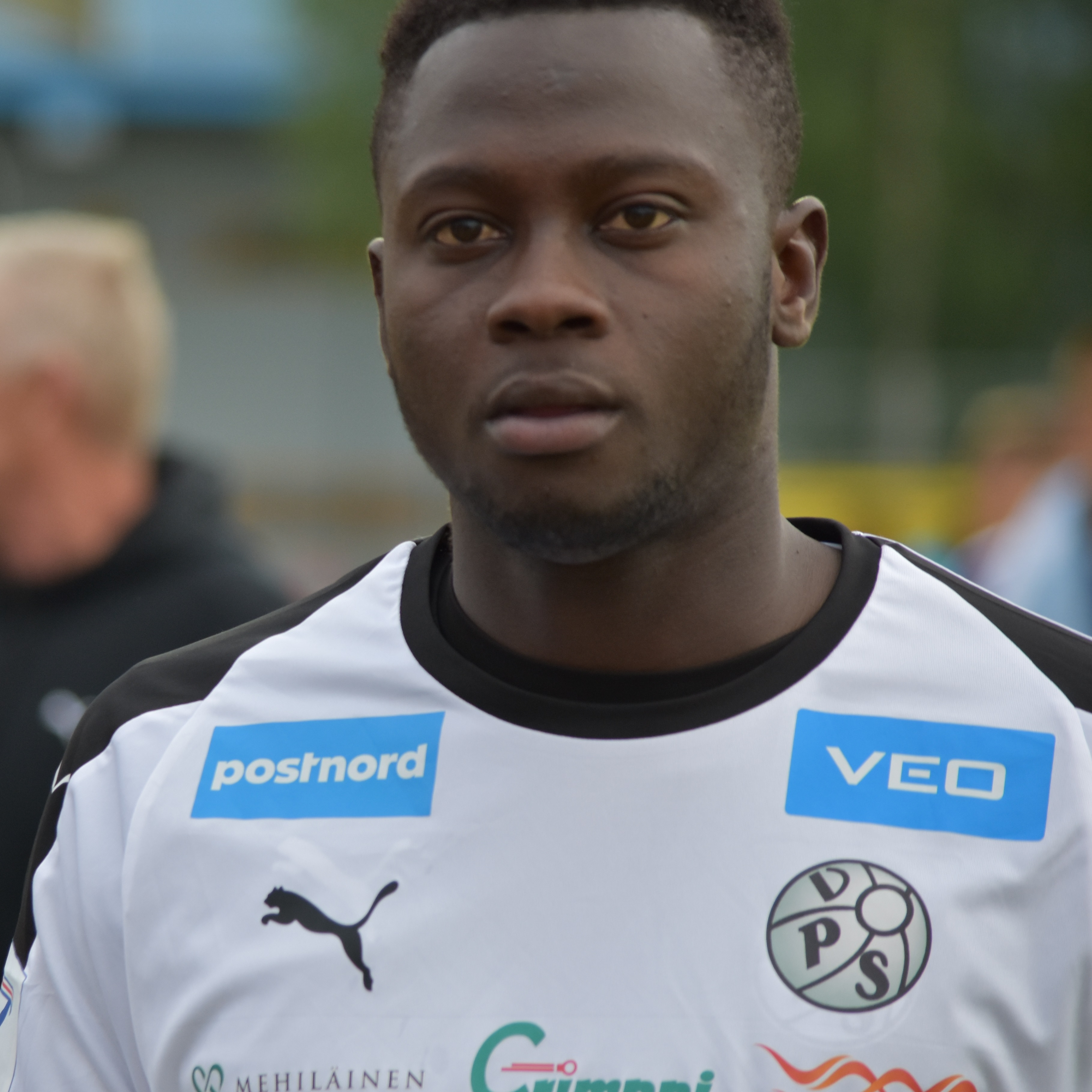
Steven Morrissey has played 198 matches for VPS

- Alanzo Adlam – IFK Mariehamn – 2013
- Andre Clennon – VPS – 2015–17
- Craig Foster – IFK Mariehamn – 2013
- Marcus Gayle – KuPS – 1990
- Hughan Gray – VPS – 2015
- Ricardo Morris – VPS – 2019
- Steven Morrissey – VPS – 2011–19, 2022–2023
- Dever Orgill – IFK Mariehamn – 2013–16
- Akeem Priestley – RoPS – 2013
- Yannick Salmon – MyPa – 2013
- Keithy Simpson – VPS – 2014
- Tremaine Stewart – RoPS – 2015
- O’Brian Woodbine – VPS, HJK – 2011–12

== Japan ==
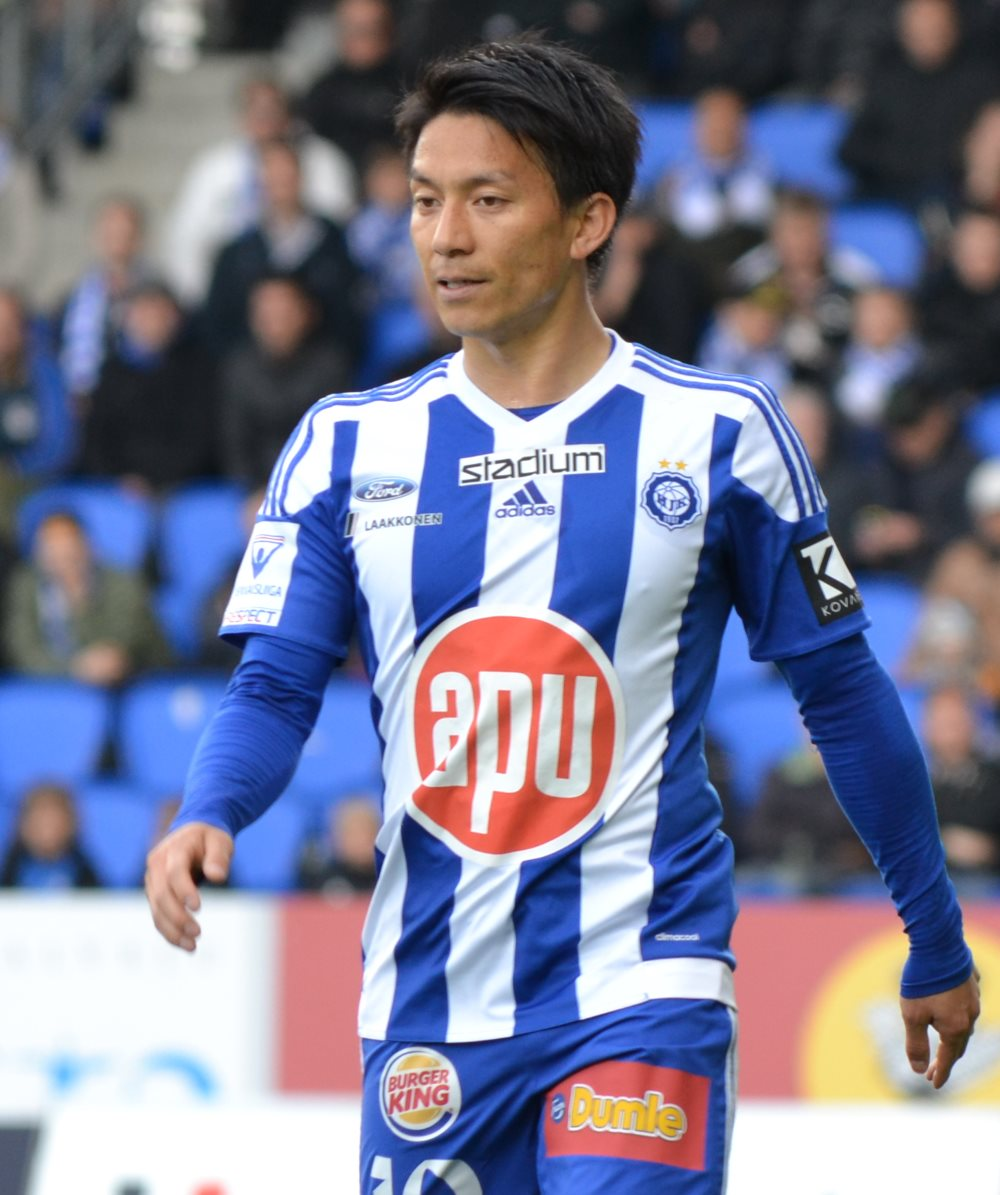
Atomu Tanaka has played 151 matches for HJK

- Mike Havenaar – HJK – 2015
- Taiki Kagayama – KPV, FC Inter – 2019–21
- **Yukiyoshi Karashima – HJK Helsinki** – 2025–
- Fugo Segawa – RoPS – 2018
- **Atomu Tanaka** – HJK, **KTP** – 2015–17, 2020–

== Kazakhstan ==
- Ilya Fomichev – TP-47, AC Oulu – 2004, 2007
- Igor Safonov – RoPS – 1996–97
- Anton Shokh – RoPS – 1993

== Kenya ==
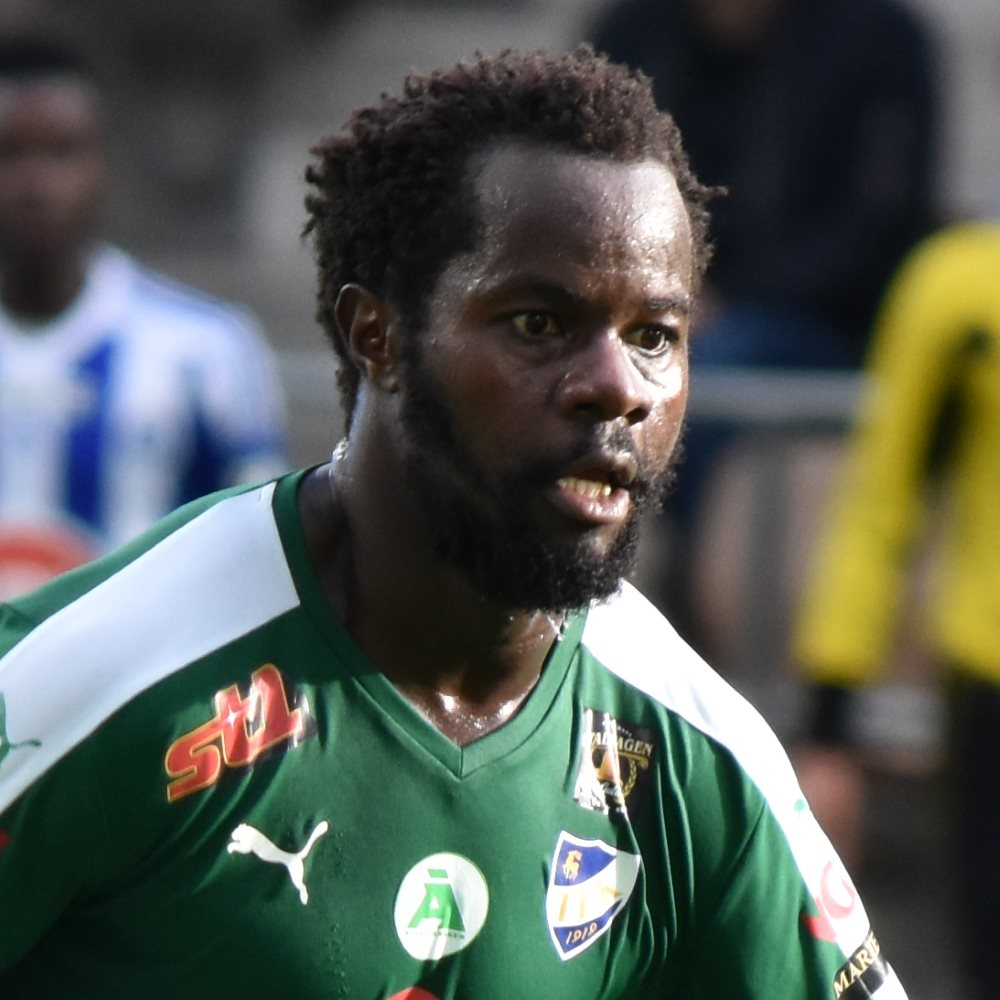
Amos Ekhalie has played 241 matches for IFK Mariehamn

- Lawrence Ouma Okoth - SJK, Seinäjoki - 2025-
- Anthony Dafaa – VPS, IFK Mariehamn – 2013–17
- Amos Ekhalie – IFK Mariehamn – 2007–12, 2014–19
- Clifton Miheso – VPS – 2015
- Willis Ochieng – IFK Mariehamn – 2007–10
- Peter Opiyo – FF Jaro, SJK – 2014–15, 2018
- Arnold Origi – HIFK – 2019–20
- Collins Sichenje – KuPS – 2023
- **William Wilson – VPS** – 2025–

== Kosovo ==
- Albinot Bekaj – FC Honka – 2014
- Arsim Gashi – IFK Mariehamn – 2009
- Yll Hoxha – TPS – 2009
- Arian Kabashi – FC Lahti, Ekenäs IF 2022–2023, 2024
- Dion Krasniqi – KuPS – 2025
- Bajram Nebihi – FC Inter – 2016
- Kushtrim Rama – TPS – 2005
- Valdrin Rashica – FC Lahti – 2020
- Anel Rashkaj – SJK – 2020
- Lum Rexhepi – FC Honka, HJK, KuPS – 2011–14, 2016, 2018
- **Arlind Sejdiu** – FC Honka, FC Lahti, FC Inter Turku, **FC Haka** – 2019–
- **Ardit Tahiri – HJK Helsinki** – 2025–
- Ymer Xhaferi – AC Oulu, FF Jaro, MyPa, PK-35 Vantaa – 2007, 2010–11, 2016
- Altin Zeqiri – FC Lahti – 2019–2023

== Kyrgyzstan ==
- Edgar Bernhardt – VPS, FC Lahti, FF Jaro – 2010–12, 2014

== Latvia ==
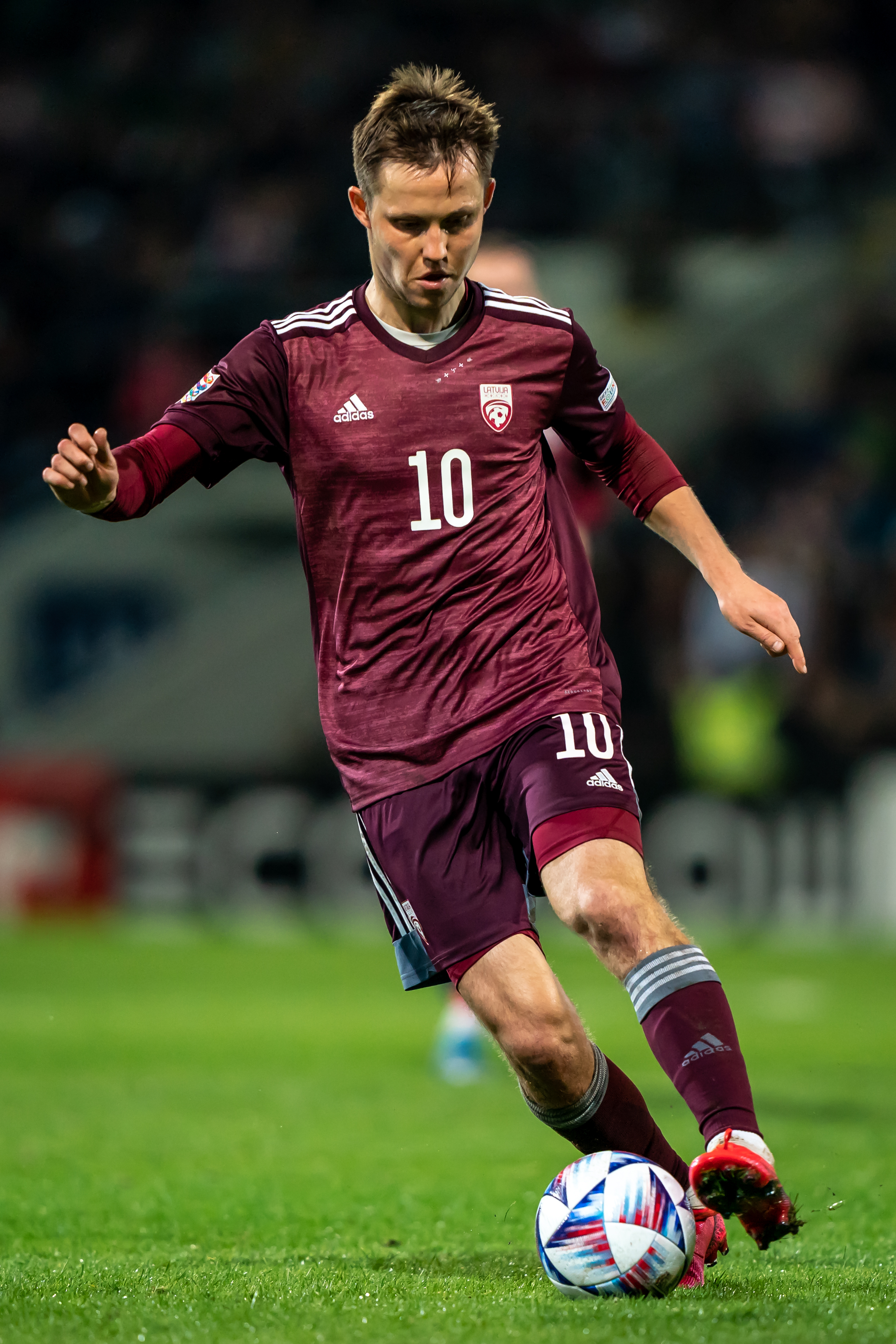
Jānis Ikaunieks has played 31 matches for KuPS

- Janis Ikaunieks – KuPS – 2021–2022
- Eduards Emsis – FC Lahti – 2022
- Aleksandr Jelisejevs – FC Hämeenlinna – 2004
- Aleksandrs Roslovs – FC Hämeenlinna – 2003–04
- Ilia Scanicins – FC Hämeenlinna – 2003–04
- Juris Sevlakovs – Ilves – 1991, 1993 ( (Soviet Union) while active)
- Igors Tarasovs – KuPS – 2020
- Krišjānis Zviedris – SJK – 2023

== Lebanon ==
- Mohamad Kdouh – Ilves – 2015

== Liberia ==
- Abel Gebor – FC Honka – 2014
- Alex Nimely – FC Honka – 2020
- Sylvanus Nimely – Ilves – 2021

== Liechtenstein ==
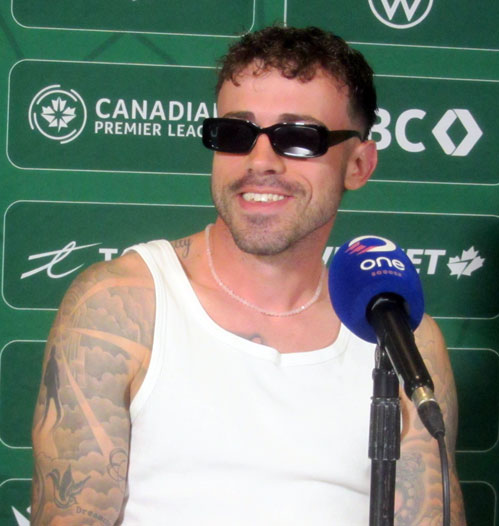
Dennis Salanović has played 26 matches for AC Oulu and Lahti

- Dennis Salanović – AC Oulu, Lahti – 2021–2022

== Lithuania ==
- **Paulius Golubickas – KuPS** – 2025–
- Darius Magdišauskas – TP-Seinäjoki – 1997
- Deivydas Matulevičius – KuPS – 2018
- Viktoras Olsanskis – FC Haka – 1996

== Mali ==
- **Madou Diakité – KTP** – 2025–
- Boubou Diallo – FC Inter Turku – 2023
- Adama Tamboura – FC Inter – 2016
- Ben Traoré – FC Haka – 2010
- Méry Traoré – Ilves – 2023

== Malaysia ==
- Nooa Laine – SJK Seinäjoki – 2021–2023

== Martinique ==
- Julien Faubert – FC Inter – 2017

== Mexico ==
- Alberto Alvarado Morin – FC Haka – 2023
- Jerónimo Amione – FC Lahti – 2019
- Daniel Antúnez – FC Inter – 2010, 2012
- Marco Bueno – HJK – 2019
- Dárvin Chávez – SJK – 2020
- Javier Paniaqua – TPS – 1994
- Alberto Ramírez – FC Inter – 2009
- José Manuel Rivera – FF Jaro – 2015

== Moldova ==
- Petru Racu – MyPa – 2008
- Victor Sevcenco – PS Kemi – 2018

== Montenegro ==
- Saša Jovović – Kemi Kings, KuPS, JJK – 2016–17
- Željko Leković – HJK – 1996 ( (Federal Republic of Yugoslavia) while active)
- Boris Lučić – FF Jaro – 2006
- Drago Milović – TPS – 2018
- Miloš Milović – FC Honka – 2014
- Saša Škara – HJK – 1996 ( (Federal Republic of Yugoslavia) while active)
- Boris Tatar – FC Lahti – 2016
- Milorad Zečević – FF Jaro – 1998 ( (Federal Republic of Yugoslavia) while active)

== Morocco ==
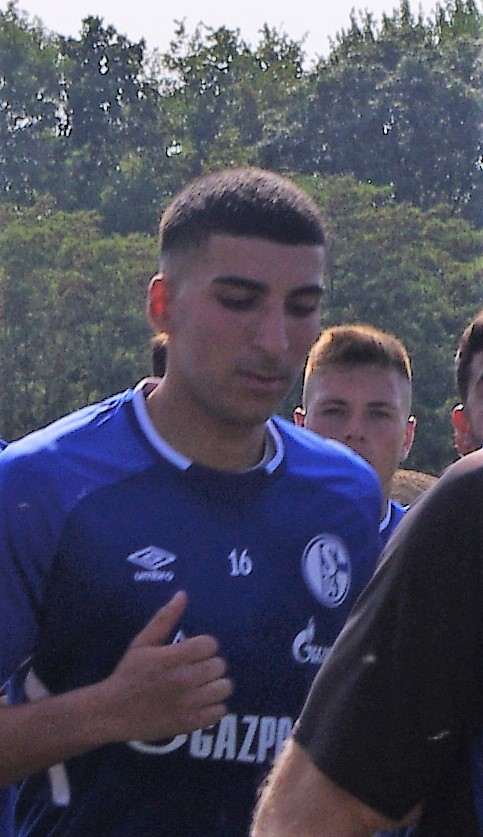
Nassim Boujellab has played 20 matches for HJK

- Nassim Boujellab – HJK Helsinki – 2023
- Hafid Salhi – FC Lahti – 2014

== Mozambique ==
- Clésio – FC Honka – 2023

== Namibia ==
- Oliver Risser – KuPS – 2010

== Netherlands ==
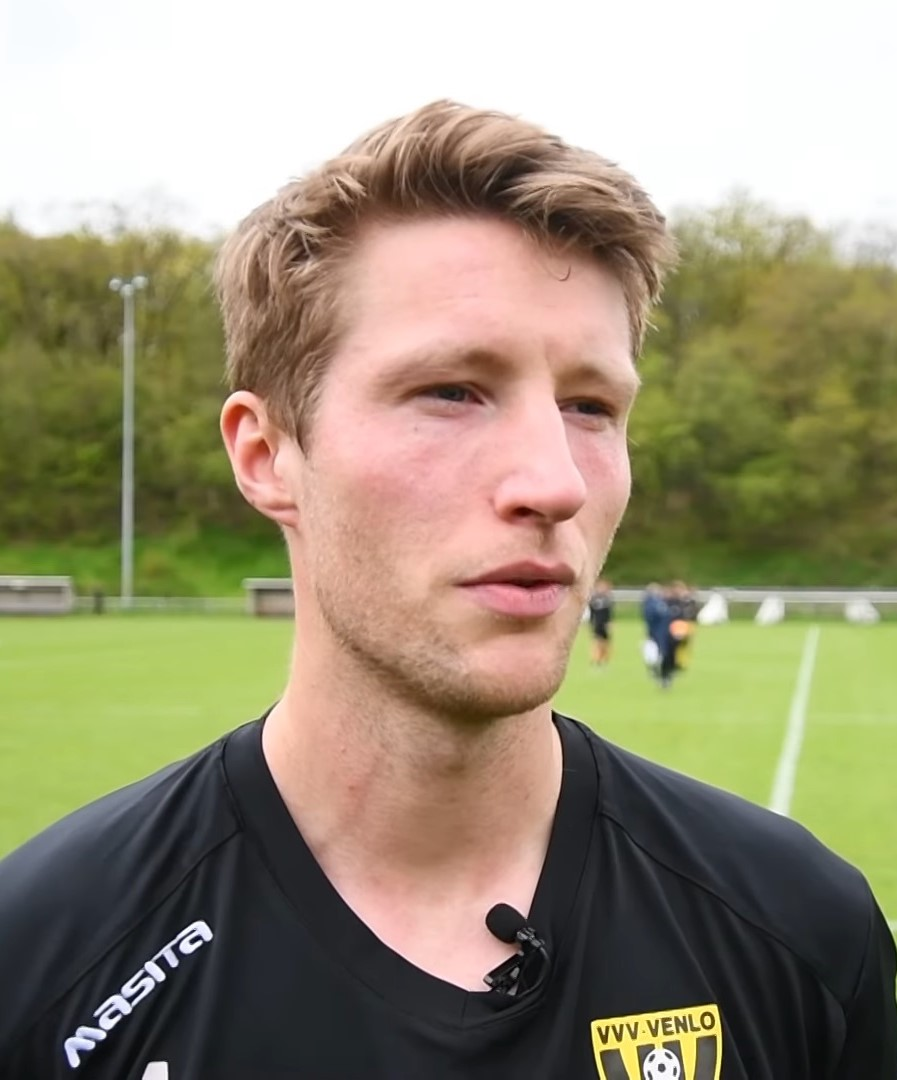
Rick Ketting played 86 matches for IFK Mariehamn and FC Inter Turku

- Martijn Abbenhuës – FC Jokerit – 2001
- Erik Bakker – FC Honka – 2019
- Justin Bakker – KuPS – 2023
- Léon Bergsma – AC Oulu – 2024–2025
- **Vicente Besuijen – HJK Helsinki** – 2025–
- Pim Bouwman – FC Inter – 2012–13
- Robin Buwalda – IFK Mariehamn – 2019–21
- Hans Denissen – FC Haka – 2009
- **Tristan Dekker – VPS** – 2025–
- Stef Doedée – FC Inter – 2012
- Patrick End – KuPS – 2001
- Jordi van Gelderen – JJK, KTP – 2012–13, 2015
- Hans Gillhaus – FF Jaro – 1998
- Guillano Grot – FC Inter – 2008–10
- **Jelle van der Heyden – IFK Mariehamn** – 2023, 2025
- Danny Hoesen – HJK – 2010
- Jos Hooiveld – FC Inter – 2007–08
- Kevin Jansen – FC Honka, FC Inter Turku – 2022–2023, 2024
- Tarik Kada – RoPS – 2019
- Dave Kastelein – TPV – 1999
- Rick Ketting – IFK Mariehamn, Inter Turku – 2019–22
- Daan Klinkenberg – Inter Turku, HIFK, KTP – 2019, 2022, 2023
- Youri Loen – FC Haka – 2021
- Thijmen Nijhuis – HJK – 2024–2025
- **Kevin Appiah Nyarko – SJK Seinäjoki** – 2025–
- Colin Odutayo – FC Lahti – 2024
- Benjamin Reemst – FC Haka – 2024
- Martin Reynders – FC Jokerit, FC Haka – 1999–2000
- Patrick Samba – VPS – 2006
- Fabian Serrarens – HJK – 2022
- **Bart Straalman** – **FC Inter Turku** – 2024–
- Sander Sybrandy – Ilves – 2024
- Kevin Tano – PS Kemi – 2017–18
- Ingo van Weert – KTP – 2021
- Nathaniel Will – RoPS – 2017

== New Zealand ==
- Nikko Boxall – VPS, KuPS, SJK, FC Inter Turku – 2015–17, 2020–21, 2023
- Kris Bright – FC Haka, IFK Mariehamn – 2012–13
- Gerard Davis – Tampere United – 2002
- Dean Dodds – Tampere United – 2000
- Raf de Gregorio – FC Jokerit, HJK – 2003–05
- Noah Hickey – Tampere United – 2001–03
- Chris James – Tampere United, KuPS – 2008–09, 2012–13
- Lee Jones – Tampere United – 2000–02
- Logan Rogerson – FC Haka – 2021–2023
- Adrian Webster – MyPa, KuPS – 2008
- Oliver Whyte – FC Haka – 2022–2024

== Nicaragua ==
- Jaime Moreno – SJK Seinäjoki – 2023–2024
- Miguel Rodríguez – SJK Seinäjoki – 2023–

== Niger ==
- Mamane Amadou Sabo – IFK Mariehamn – 2024
- Yussif Moussa – Ilves – 2019–20, 2022–23
- Seydine N'Diaye – Ilves – 2023
- Najeeb Yakubu – Ilves – 2022–23

== Nigeria ==
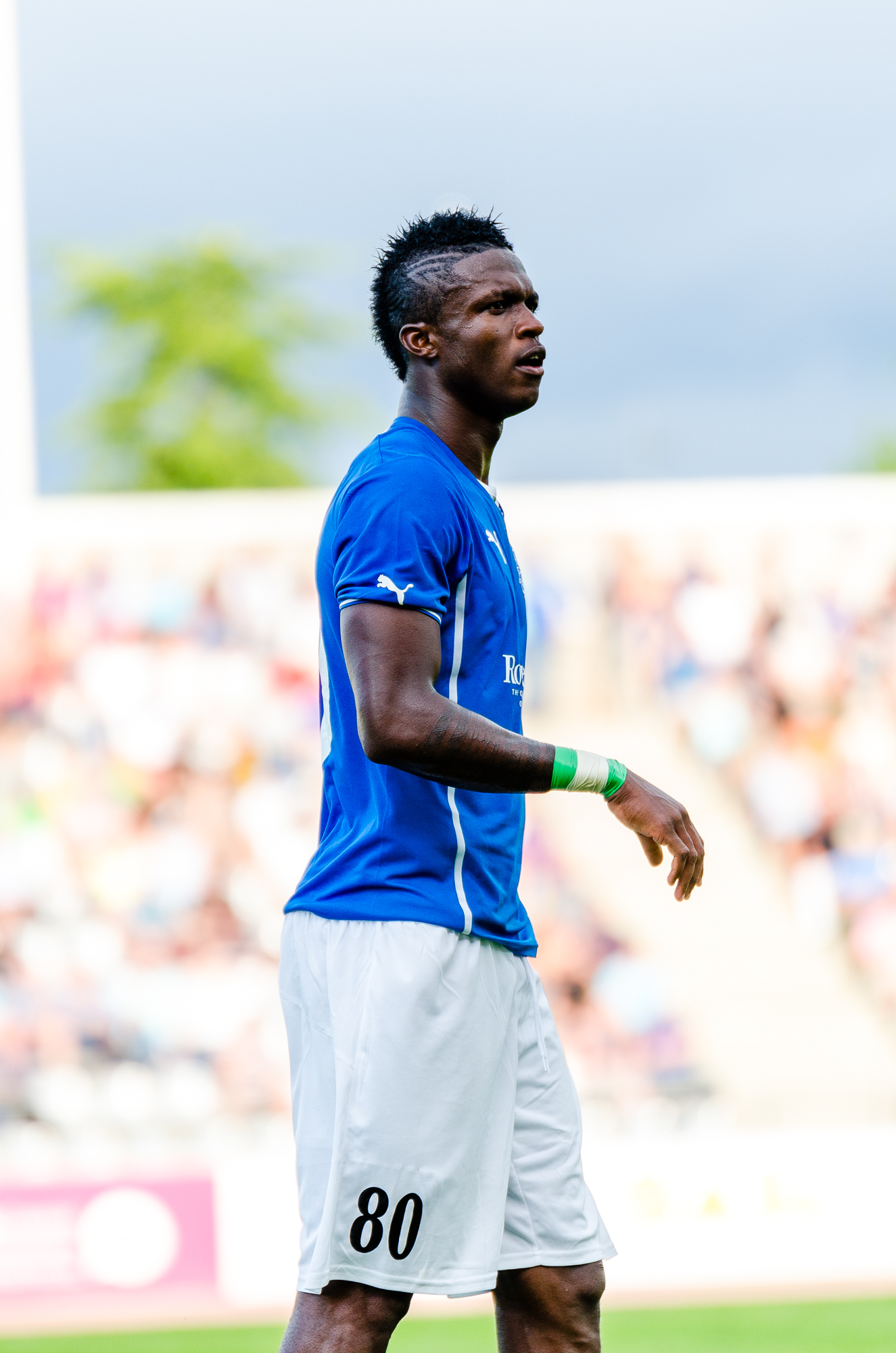
Faith Obilor has played 206 matches for Inter Turku, RoPS and HJK Helsinki

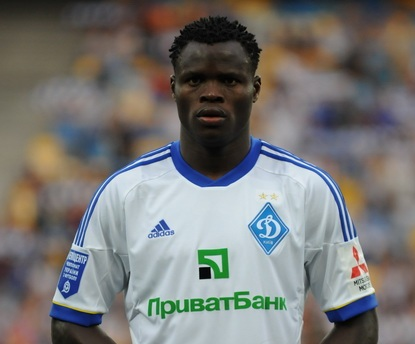
Taye Taiwo played 91 matches for HJK Helsinki and RoPS

- Aliyu Abubakar – KuPS, PS Kemi – 2016, 2018
- Adeneiyi Agbejule – VPS – 2001
- Taiye Ajiye – PS Kemi – 2018
- **Adeleke Akinyemi – Ilves** – 2024–
- Hope Akpan – SJK – 2021
- Joshua Akpudje – Ilves – 2024
- Ndukaku Alison – RoPS – 2013–14
- Ifaenyi Ani – HIFK – 2022
- Jeremiah Ani – RoPS – 2009
- Obiora Aniche – HJK – 1995–97
- Edward Anyamkyegh – KuPS – 2005
- Samuel Ayorinde – FF Jaro – 1997
- Bola – Ponnistus – 1995
- Yero Bello – Ilves – 2016
- Dominic Chatto – FC Inter – 2007–08
- Francis Chibuike – KuPS – 2014–15
- Samuel Chidi – FC Haka – 2020–21
- Macauley Chrisantus – HJK – 2018
- **Cody David – IFK Mariehamn** – 2025–
- Dudu – KuPS, FC Honka – 2010–13
- Osahon Eboigbe – VPS – 2010
- Samson Ebuka Obioha – SJK – 2022–2023
- Philip Edeipo – RoPS – 2008
- Raphael Edereho – RoPS, AC Oulu, VPS – 2005, 2007–08
- Daniel Osinachi Egwim – FC Inter – 2010–11, 2014
- Azubuike Egwueke – KuPS – 2016–17
- Elderson – HJK – 2019
- Kennedy Eriba – TPS – 2012–13
- **Mmenie-Abasi Etok – VPS** – 2025–
- Emeka Eze – RoPS – 2017
- Iyam Friday – AC Oulu – 2007
- Reuben Gabriel – KuPS – 2017–18
- Geoffrey Chinedu – FC Lahti – 2021–2022
- Michael Ibiyomi – RoPS – 2015
- Bright Igbinadolor – FC Jokerit – 2001
- Kennedy Igboananike – IFK Mariehamn – 2021
- Segun Ikudehinbu – KuPS – 2009
- Abdullahi Ishaka – FC Haka – 2008
- Abonima Izuegbu – SJK – 2016
- Augustine Jibrin – VPS – 2012
- Sani Kaita – RoPS – 2017
- Emenike Uchenna Mbachu – RoPS, Ilves – 2013–15
- Peter Godly Michael – VPS – 2023
- **Tijjani Mohammed – VPS** – 2025–
- Mohammed Muritala – KuPS – 2024
- Philip Njoku – FC Inter – 2015–17
- Dickson Nwakaeme – KuPS – 2009–11
- Kennedy Ugoala Nwanganga – FC Inter – 2009–10, 2016
- Harrison Nwanyanwu – KuPS – 2006
- Daniel Nwoke – Tampere United – 2007–08
- Jude Nworuh – Ilves – 2017
- Faith Friday Obilor – FC Inter, RoPS, HJK – 2012–19
- Paul Obiefule – KuPS – 2012
- Nnamdi Oduamadi – HJK – 2016
- Jerome Ogbuefi – KuPS – 2010
- Emmanuel Ogude – VPS – 2024
- **Michael Ogungbaro** – KTP, **FF Jaro** – 2021, 2023, 2025–
- Paul Ogunkoya – KuPS – 2024
- Obinna Okafor – KTP – 2008
- Dennis Okaru – TPS – 2011–14
- **Emmanuel Okereke** – **IFK Mariehamn** – 2024–
- Echiabhi Okodugha – KuPS, RoPS, IFK Mariehamn – 2008–11
- Frankline Okoye – IFK Mariehamn – 2020–21
- Samuel Olabisi – RoPS – 2019–20
- Ojembe Olatuga – PK-35 Vantaa – 2016
- Azubuike Oliseh – FC Jokerit – 2001
- Josh Oluwayemi – FC Lahti – 2024
- Gomo Onduku – Ilves – 2018
- Paul Onobi – KuPS – 2016
- Vincent Onovo – FC Inter, HJK – 2014–17
- David Onyeanula – HIFK – 2022
- Lucky Opara – AC Oulu – 2021
- John Owoeri – IFK Mariehamn – 2022
- Gbolahan Salami – KuPS – 2016–17
- Usman Sale – KuPS, AC Oulu – 2020–21
- Soga Sambo – FC Inter – 2008
- **Spencer Silas – AC Oulu** – 2025–
- Victor Raymond Solomon – VPS – 2007
- **Nathaniel Tahmbi – SJK Seinäjoki** – 2025–
- Taye Taiwo – HJK, RoPS – 2015–16, 2018–19
- Raphael Udah – KuPS – 2009–11
- Aniekpeno Udoh – KuPS – 2020–21
- Henry Chidozie Ugwunna – Ilves – 2015
- Akombo Ukeyima – IFK Mariehamn – 2008
- Henry Uzochukwu – KuPS – 2021–22
- Izunna Uzochukwu – FC Honka – 2021
- Olajide Williams – KuPS, MyPa – 2010–13
- Babatunde Wusu – TPS, JJK, KTP – 2003–04, 2009–13, 2015

== North Macedonia ==
- Betim Aliju – KuPS – 2009
- Ylber Aliu – VPS – 2000
- Shkumbin Arslani – JJK – 2009
- Toni Banduliev – AC Oulu – 2007
- Egzon Belica – FC Inter – 2015–16
- Husein Demiri – PS Kemi – 2018
- Ferhan Hasani – HJK – 2020
- Georgi Hristov – JJK – 2009
- Dejan Iliev – HJK Helsinki – 2023
- Demir Imeri – PS Kemi – 2018
- Filip Ivanovski – RoPS, KPV – 2018–19
- Nebi Mustafi – FC Haka, MyPa – 2006–09
- Calvin N'Sombo – PK-35 Vantaa – 2016
- Sakir Redzepi – FC Honka – 2014
- Artim Šakiri – FC Inter – 2006
- Marko Simonovski – FC Lahti – 2017
- Damjan Siskovski – FC Lahti, RoPS – 2018–19
- Davor Taleski – FC Honka – 2018

== Northern Ireland ==
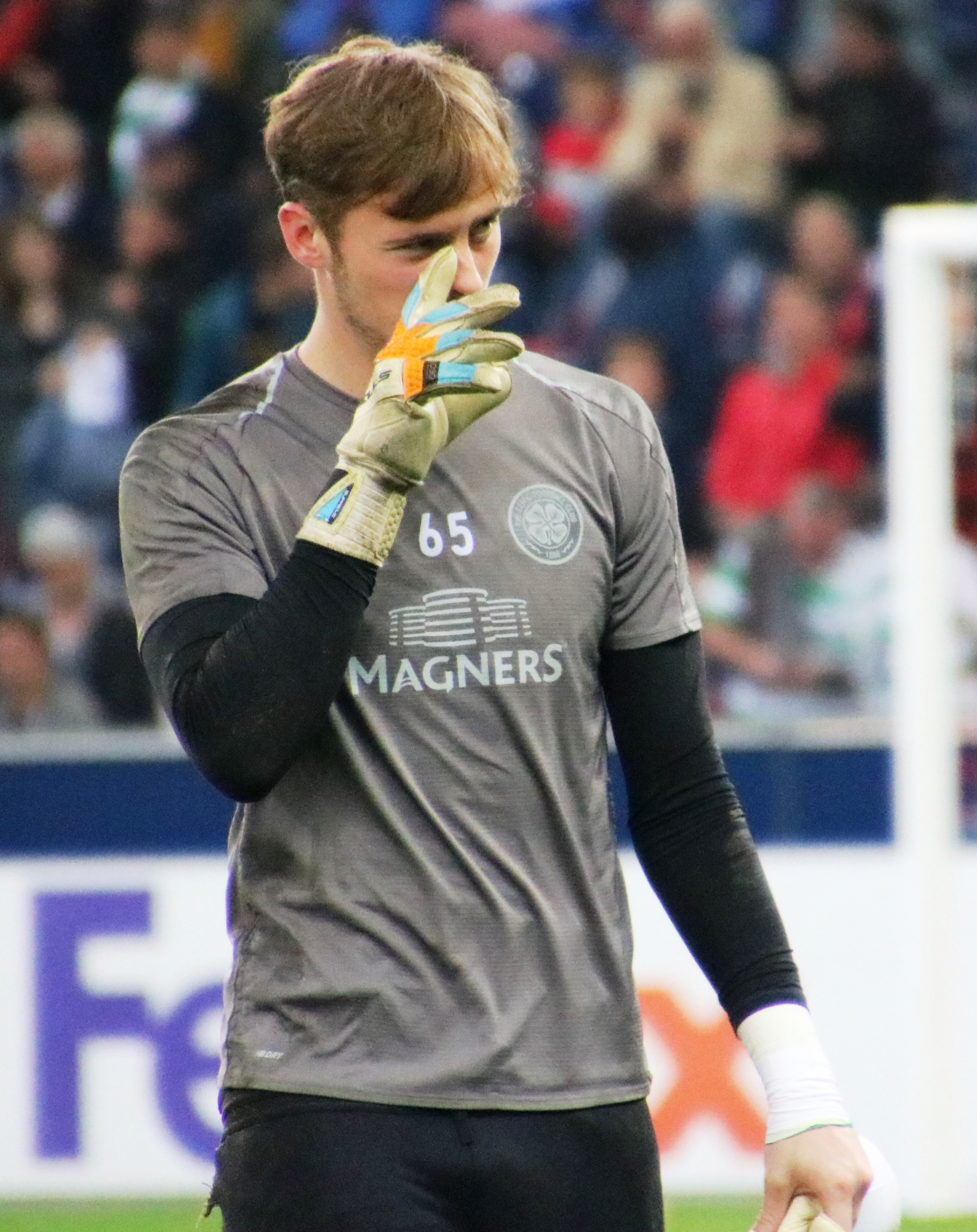
Conor Hazard played 24 matches for HJK

- Roy Essandoh – VPS – 1998–2000
- Jake Dunwoody – HIFK, SJK, AC Oulu – 2021, 2022–23, 2024
- Conor Hazard – HJK – 2022
- **Liam Hughes – FC Haka** – 2025–
- Tennant McVea – FC Lahti – 2010

== Norway ==
- Liiban Abadid – AC Oulu – 2024
- Jacob Dunsby – HIFK – 2019
- Ahmed El-Amrani – FC Honka – 2018
- Jonas Enkerud – IF Gnistan – 2024
- Mats Haakenstad – KuPS – 2020
- **Didrik Hafstad – IF Gnistan** – 2025–
- Mahmod Hejazi – FF Jaro – 2006
- Saibou Keita – FC Haka – 2020
- **Thomas Kinn – AC Oulu** – 2025–
- Roger Lange – VPS – 1998
- Marius Larsen – KTP – 2025
- Gunnar Norebö – VPS – 1998
- Joachim Osvold – TPS, KuPS – 2014–15
- Harmeet Singh – HJK – 2019
- Ståle Steen Sæthre – HIFK – 2022
- Ole Talberg – FF Jaro – 2002
- Tobias Vibe – HIFK – 2019
- Rune Warholm – MyPa – 1997

== Papua New Guinea ==
- David Browne – HJK – 2020–2022

== Paraguay ==
- Isidro Leguizamón – MyPa – 2006
- Hugo Miranda – MyPa, FC Lahti, FF Jaro – 2005–08, 2010, 2013

== Peru ==
- Josef Chávez – FC Haka – 2009–11
- Héctor Takayama – FC Jazz – 2000–01
- Benito Yllaconza – FC Haka – 2010

== Philippines ==
- Oskari Kekkonen – FC Lahti, KTP – 2017–18, 2021
- Amin Nazari – IFK Mariehamn – 2018

== Poland ==
- Andrzej Ambrożej – RoPS – 1990
- Tomasz Arceusz – VPS – 1995–96
- Cezary Baca – VPS – 1996–97
- Grzegorz Bała – RoPS – 2000
- Kazimierz Buda – VPS – 1995–96
- Piotr Burlikowski – RoPS – 2001
- Marek Czakon – Ilves – 1990–91
- Krzysztof Gawara – FF Jaro, TPV – 1991–95
- Robert Jadczak – RoPS – 2001
- Rafał Kaczor – RoPS – 2001
- Marek Kryński – RoPS – 1999, 2001
- Grzegorz Kubica – FC Jazz – 2001
- Dariusz Marzec – TPV, FC Jazz – 1999, 2001
- Marcin Pachowicz – AC Allianssi – 2003
- **Piotr Parzyszek – KuPS** – 2025–
- Jacek Perzyk – RoPS, VPS – 1994–96, 1999
- Janusz Prucheński – FF Jaro – 1998
- Kazimierz Putek – FC Jazz – 1991
- Jowin Radziński – AC Oulu – 2024
- Józef Robakiewicz – Mikkelin Palloilijat – 1992
- Robert Rogan – RoPS – 2000
- Tomasz Sajdak – HJK – 2008
- Mariusz Sawa – RoPS – 2001
- Michał Sławuta – FC Haka, FC Lahti – 2002–07, 2011
- Maciej Truszczyński – VPS – 2008
- Zbigniew Wachowicz – RoPS – 2000
- Grzegorz Wagner – TPV – 1999
- Rafał Wolsztyński – SJK – 2021–2022
- Wiesław Wraga – OTP, FC Oulu – 1990–92
- Piotr Zajączkowski – FF Jaro, VPS – 1998, 2000

== Portugal ==
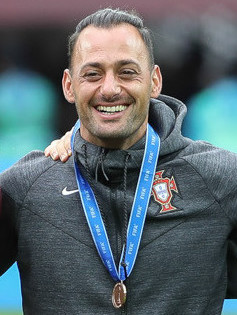
Beto played 12 matches for HIFK

- Beto – HIFK – 2022
- Jordão Cardoso – FC Lahti – 2024
- Tomás Castro – Gnistan – 2024
- Jorginho – Ilves – 2023–2024
- Bubacar Djaló – HJK, FC Lahti – 2020–2021, 2023–2024
- Sandro Sakho – AC Oulu – 2022
- Rafael Floro – AC Oulu – 2022
- Wato Kuaté – RoPS – 2018
- Rodrigo Macedo – FC Haka – 2024
- Pedro Machado – IFK Mariehamn – 2024
- André Martins – IFK Mariehamn – 2010
- Rui Modesto – FC Honka – 2020–2022
- Guilherme Morais – FC Haka – 2024
- Bruno Rodrigues – KuPS – 2020
- Luis Santos – MyPa – 1993
- **Miguel Santos – FF Jaro** – 2025–
- Nuno Tomás – KuPS – 2020

== Puerto Rico ==
- Alex Oikkonen – MyPa – 2014

== Romania ==
- Ciprian Brighiu – TP-47 – 2004
- Dan Chilom – IFK Mariehamn – 2008
- Alexandru Marca – Tampere United – 2000
- Vasile Marchis – FC Jazz, Tampere United, MyPa – 2002–07
- David Popa – AC Oulu – 2021
- Alexandru Udrea – RoPS – 2001
- Nicolae Vasile – PS Kemi – 2016

== Russia ==
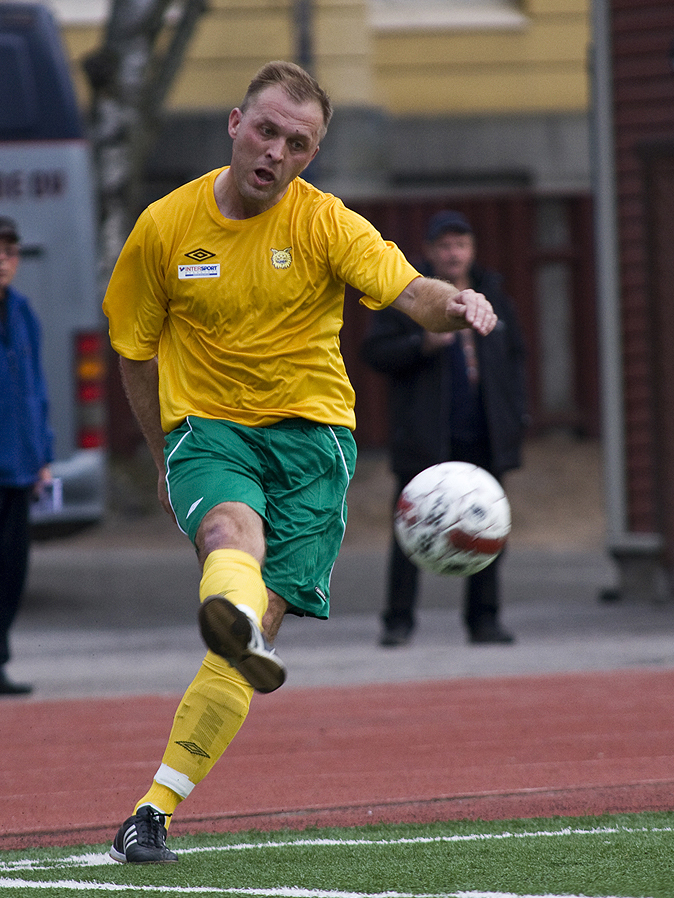
Valeri Popovitch has played 395 matches for TPV, Ilves, Haka and HJK. He is the all-time leading goalscorer of Veikkausliiga with 166 goals.

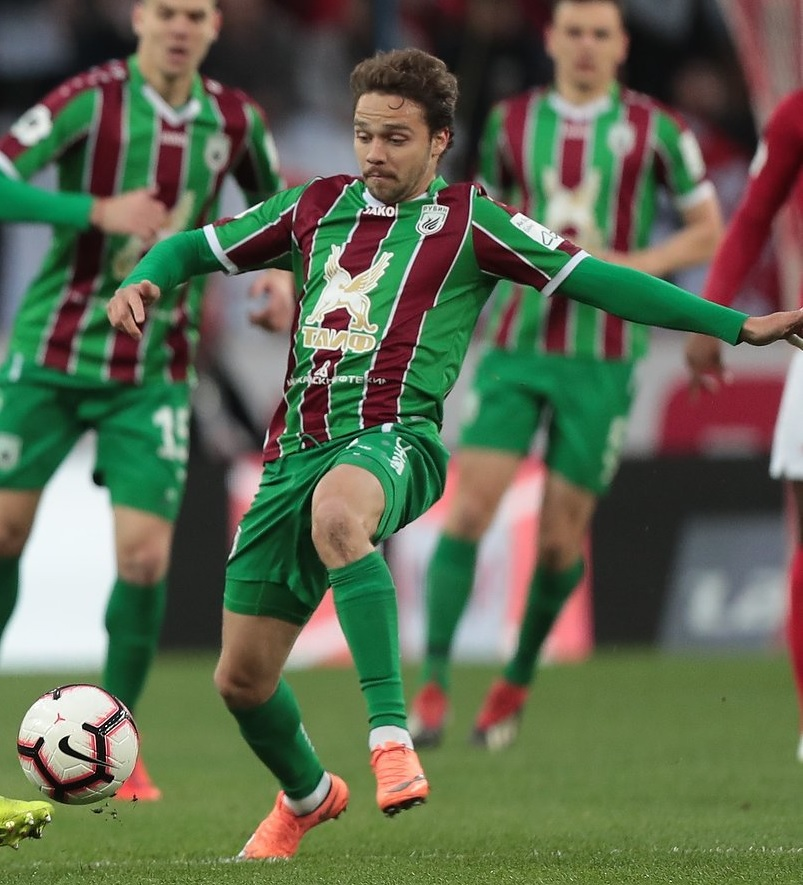
Yevgeni Bashkirov has played 55 matches for VPS.

- **Yevgeni Bashkirov** – VPS, **Gnistan** – 2023–2024, 2025–
- Mikhail Biryukov – MyPa – 1992–93 ( (Commonwealth of Independent States) when active)
- Valeri Broshin – KuPS – 1992 ( (Commonwealth of Independent States) when active)
- Anatoli Bulgakov – TP-47, AC Oulu – 2004–05, 2007
- Aleksei Burdman – FC Kuusysi – 1995
- Igor Cheminava – KuPS – 2017
- Igor Danilov – KuPS – 1994
- Anatoli Davydov – Ponnistus – 1995
- Aleksandr Dovbnya – FC Haka – 2007–08
- Aleksey Eremenko Sr. – FF Jaro, HJK – 1991–97, 1999–2005 ( (Soviet Union) when active)
- Sergey Eremenko – FF Jaro, SJK, AC Oulu – 2014–15, 2019, 2021
- Aleksei Gulo – KTP – 1999–2000
- Valeri Glushakov – FC Kuusysi – 1991–94 ( (Soviet Union) when active)
- Giorgi Gorozia – RoPS – 2018
- Aleksandr Halzov – Ilves – 1995
- Aleksandr Ivanov – TPS – 1991 ( (Soviet Union) when active)
- Oleg Ivanov – TPV, Ilves, FC Haka, KTP, FC Lahti, FC Hämeenlinna – 1993–96, 1998–2002
- Vasili Karataev – RoPS, HJK, TPV – 1991–95, 1997 ( (Soviet Union) when active)
- Almir Kayumov – KuPS – 1992 ( (Commonwealth of Independent States) when active)
- Dmitri Klimov – KuPS – 2006
- Evgeni Kobozev – VPS – 2016
- Aleksandr Komov – KTP – 2003
- Aleksandr Kostin – Ilves – 1995
- Igor Kuznetshenkov – Mikkelin Palloilijat – 1996
- Sergey Leonov – KTP – 2000
- Aleksandr Mishchuk – Atlantis FC, AC Allianssi, TP-47 – 2001–04
- Pavel Nazimov – FC Lahti – 2017
- Sergey Neyman – MyPa – 1993
- Pavel Osipov – FC Lahti – 2016, 2018
- Aleksei Petrov – RoPS – 2000–01
- Valeri Popovitch – TPV, Ilves, FC Haka, HJK – 1993–96, 1998–2009
- Aleksey Prudnikov – FF Jaro – 1993
- Maksim Rudakov – HJK, FC Honka – 2018–19, 2022–2023
- Evgeni Smirnov – MyPa, KuPS – 1999–2002
- Dmitriy Sokolov – TPS – 2003
- Ivan Solovyov – FC Lahti – 2016
- Vladimir Stroganov – VPS, Ilves – 1995–96
- Ivan Tarasov – HJK – 2019
- Evgeni Titov – Ilves – 1994
- Denis Tumasyan – FF Jaro – 2004–05
- Ilya Vaganov – FF Jaro – 2011–12, 2014–15
- Maksim Vasilyev – FF Jaro – 2010–12
- Aleksandr Vasyutin – FC Lahti – 2016–18
- Aleksandr Verinzhnikov – RoPS – 1992 ( (Commonwealth of Independent States) when active)
- Denis Volodin – MyPa, FC Jazz, TP-47 – 2000–04
- Aleksandr Vorobjov – FF Jaro – 1993
- Maksim Votinov – MyPa – 2009–2011
- Artem Vyatkin – FC Lahti – 2018
- Stanislav Yefimov – Ekenäs IF – 2024
- Aleksey Zhukov – RoPS – 2000

== Saint Vincent and the Grenadines ==
- Cornelius Stewart – VPS, PS Kemi – 2014, 2016

== Saudi Arabia ==
- Abdulfattah Asiri – IFK Mariehamn – 2023

== Scotland ==
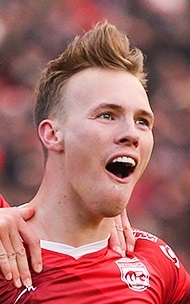
Lee Erwin has played 39 matches for Haka and HJK

- James Beattie – MyPa – 1993
- Stuart Callaghan – Finnairin Palloilijat – 1998
- Martyn Corrigan – FC Jokerit – 1999
- Robbie Crawford – IFK Mariehamn – 2019
- Gerry Creaney – TPV – 1999
- Lee Erwin – FC Haka, HJK – 2022, 2024
- Brian Gilmour – FC Haka – 2008
- **Jordan Houston – FC Haka** – 2025–
- Grant Kerr – VPS – 2013
- Billy MacDonald – FF Jaro – 1998
- Graeme Morrison – TPV – 1999
- Craig Ramsay – KPV – 1990
- Grant Smith – HJK – 2007
- Lewis Strapp – SJK Seinäjoki – 2024

== Senegal ==
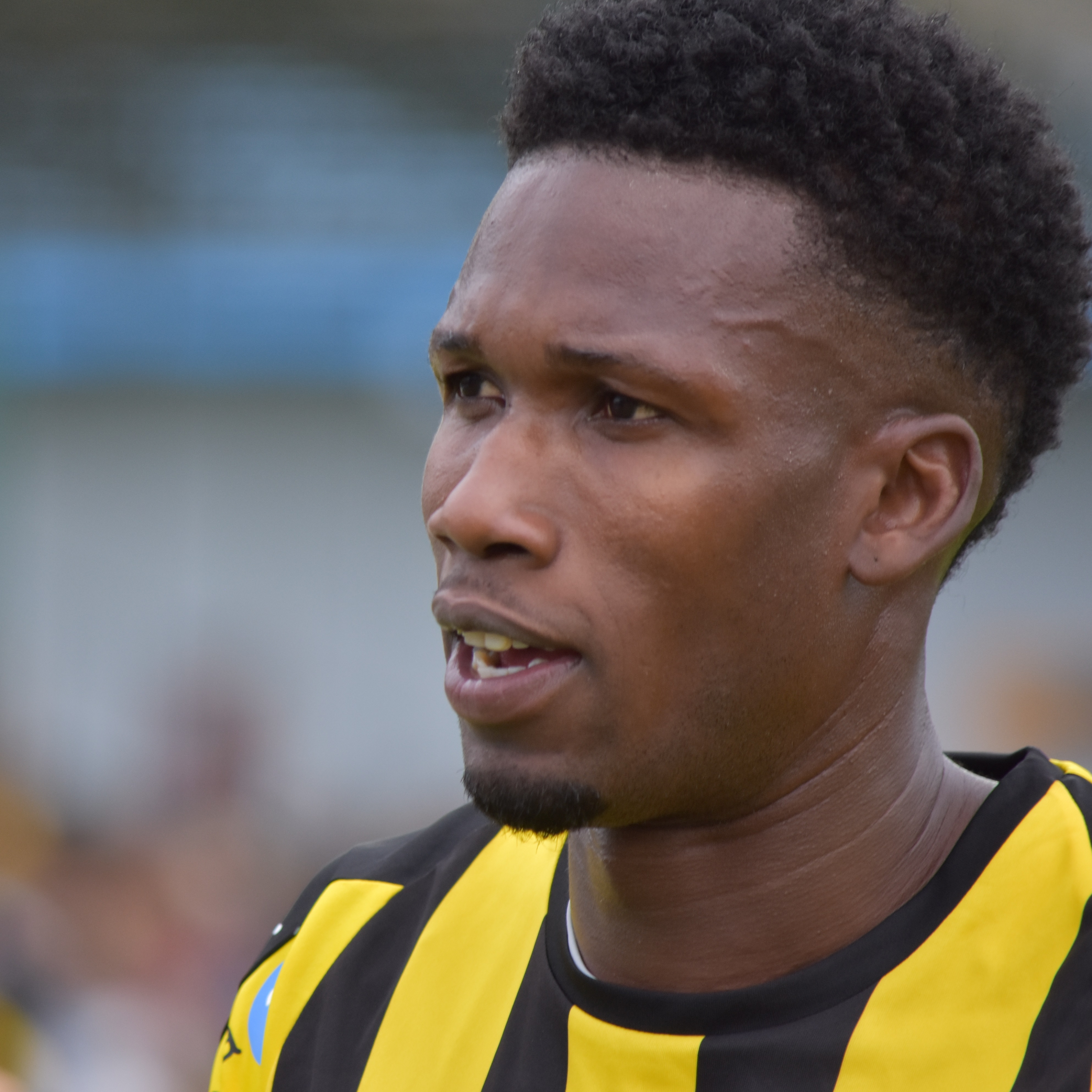
Macoumba Kandji has played 151 matches for HJK Helsinki, Inter Turku, Honka and Lahti

- Abdoulaye Ba – Ilves – 2018
- Samba Benga – SJK – 2019
- Elhadji Ciss – VPS – 2018
- Bouna Coundoul – VPS – 2012
- Ali Dia – Finnairin Palloilijat – 1995
- Diawandou Diagne – KTP – 2021
- Babacar Diallo – FC Inter, KuPS – 2011–13, 2015–16, 2019
- Matar Dieye – KuPS – 2023
- Babacar Diop – TPS – 2020
- Mamadou Diouf – Ilves – 2015
- **Maissa Fall** – FC Haka, **VPS** – 2023–
- El-Hadji Gana Kane – SJK, KPV – 2016, 2019
- Ibrahima Gueye – VPS – 2018
- Médoune Gueye – IFK Mariehamn – 2010
- Macoumba Kandji – HJK, FC Inter, FC Honka, FC Lahti – 2014–15, 2017–18, 2020–2022
- Yoro Ly – Ilves – 2016
- Fallou Ndiaye – FC Haka, SJK, 2023–2024
- Papa Niang – FF Jaro – 2009–12
- **Assan Seck – KTP Kotka** – 2025–
- Pape Sow – FC Inter – 2016
- Emile Paul Tendeng – Ilves, SJK, IFK Mariehamn – 2016–21
- Issa Thiaw – Ilves, KuPS – 2018–19

== Serbia ==
- Lulezim Avdija – RoPS – 2005 ( (Serbia and Montenegro) when active)
- Marko Bačanin – FC Haka – 2024
- Dragan Bajić – TPV, FC Haka – 1999–2001 ( (Federal Republic of Yugoslavia) when active)
- Vasilije Bakić – Ilves – 2025
- Zoran Bogešić – KTP, RoPS – 2003–05 ( (Serbia and Montenegro) when active)
- **Mihailo Bogićević – HJK Helsinki** – 2025–
- Nemanja Bosančić – FC Lahti – 2022
- Dejan Brankovic – JJK – 2005 ( (Serbia and Montenegro) when active)
- Davor Celic – AC Oulu – 2010
- Budimir Djukić – HJK – 2004 ( (Serbia and Montenegro) when active)
- Dalibor Djurić – RoPS – 2004 ( (Serbia and Montenegro) when active)
- Miloš Josimov – KPV – 2019
- Mihailo Jovanović – KuPS – 2001 ( (Federal Republic of Yugoslavia) when active)
- Aleksandar Katanić – FC Honka – 2023
- Velibor Kopunović – Tampere United – 2005 ( (Serbia and Montenegro) when active)
- Srdjan Lakić – RoPS – 2005 ( (Serbia and Montenegro) when active)
- Slavko Mandić – RoPS – 2004 ( (Serbia and Montenegro) when active)
- Ratko Marijanović – RoPS – 2004 ( (Serbia and Montenegro) when active)
- Mladen Milinković – FF Jaro – 1998 ( (Federal Republic of Yugoslavia) when active)
- Pavle Milosavljević – SJK, Ilves – 2014–16
- Nenad Nonković – TPV – 1999 ( (Federal Republic of Yugoslavia) when active)
- Nemanja Obradović – FC Honka – 2018
- Ivan Ostojić – HJK – 2020
- Zoran Peić – TP-47 – 2004 ( (Serbia and Montenegro) when active)
- Bojan Radulović – HJK – 2022–2023
- Željko Savić – SJK, PS Kemi, FC Honka, TPS – 2014–16, 2018
- Srđan Savičević – TPV – 1999 ( (Federal Republic of Yugoslavia) when active)
- Dejan Srdić – TPV – 2005 ( (Serbia and Montenegro) when active)
- Ivan Tatomirović – HJK, RoPS, IFK Mariehamn – 2016–18
- Nebojša Tomić – KTP – 2003 ( (Serbia and Montenegro) when active)
- Aleksandar Vasiljević – HJK – 2005 ( (Serbia and Montenegro) when active)

== Sierra Leone ==
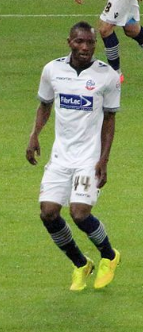
Medo has played 153 matches for KuPS, HJK and Haka

- Patrick Bantamoi – KuPS, FC Inter, RoPS – 2005–10, 2014
- Samuel Barlay – IFK Mariehamn – 2006, 2008
- **Abu Dumbuya – AC Oulu** – 2025–
- Kei Kamara – HIFK – 2021
- John Keister – HJK – 2006–07
- Mohamed Koroma – FC Haka – 2011–12
- Medo – KuPS, HJK, FC Haka – 2006–10, 2016, 2020
- Obi Metzger – FC Haka – 2011–12
- Kabba Samura – HJK – 2007
- Hassan Sesay – KuPS, FC Lahti, MyPa, HIFK – 2008, 2011–19
- Rodney Strasser – TPS – 2020

== Slovakia ==
- Mário Adamčík – KuPS – 2001
- Rudolf Matta – KuPS – 2001–03
- Michal Mravec – RoPS – 2016
- Robert Petrus – FC Kuusysi – 1995
- Vladimir Sykora – VPS – 1999
- Marian Takac – Lahden Reipas – 1990 ( (Czechoslovakia) when active)

== Slovenia ==
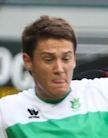
Filip Valenčič has played 133 matches for PS Kemi, HJK Helsinki, Inter Turku and KuPS

- Filip Valencic – PS Kemi, HJK, FC Inter – 2016–21

== Somalia ==
- Ahmed Said Ahmed – PK-35 Vantaa – 2016
- Omar Jama – PS Kemi, VPS – 2017–18
- Fahad Mohamed – Ekenäs IF – 2024
- Hussein Mohamed – HIFK, FC Haka – 2019, 2021

== South Africa ==
- Yanga Baliso – IFK Mariehamn, AC Oulu – 2020–2022, 2023
- Chad Botha – FC Inter, FF Jaro – 2004, 2007
- Ryan Botha – MyPa, FC Inter – 2002–04
- Grant Crawford – KuPS – 2003
- Cheyne Fowler – FC Haka, HJK, VPS – 2003–14
- Neathan Gibson – MyPa – 1998–2000
- Leroy Maluka – TPS – 2010–12, 2014
- Darren Smith – FC Honka, FC Inter Turku – 2021, 2023–2024

== South Korea ==
- Kim Hyeon-kwan – JJK – 2009
- Kwon Jung-hyuk – RoPS, VPS – 2009–10
- Lee Ho-jin – JJK – 2009
- Nam Ik-kyung – JJK, FC Haka – 2009–10

== Spain ==
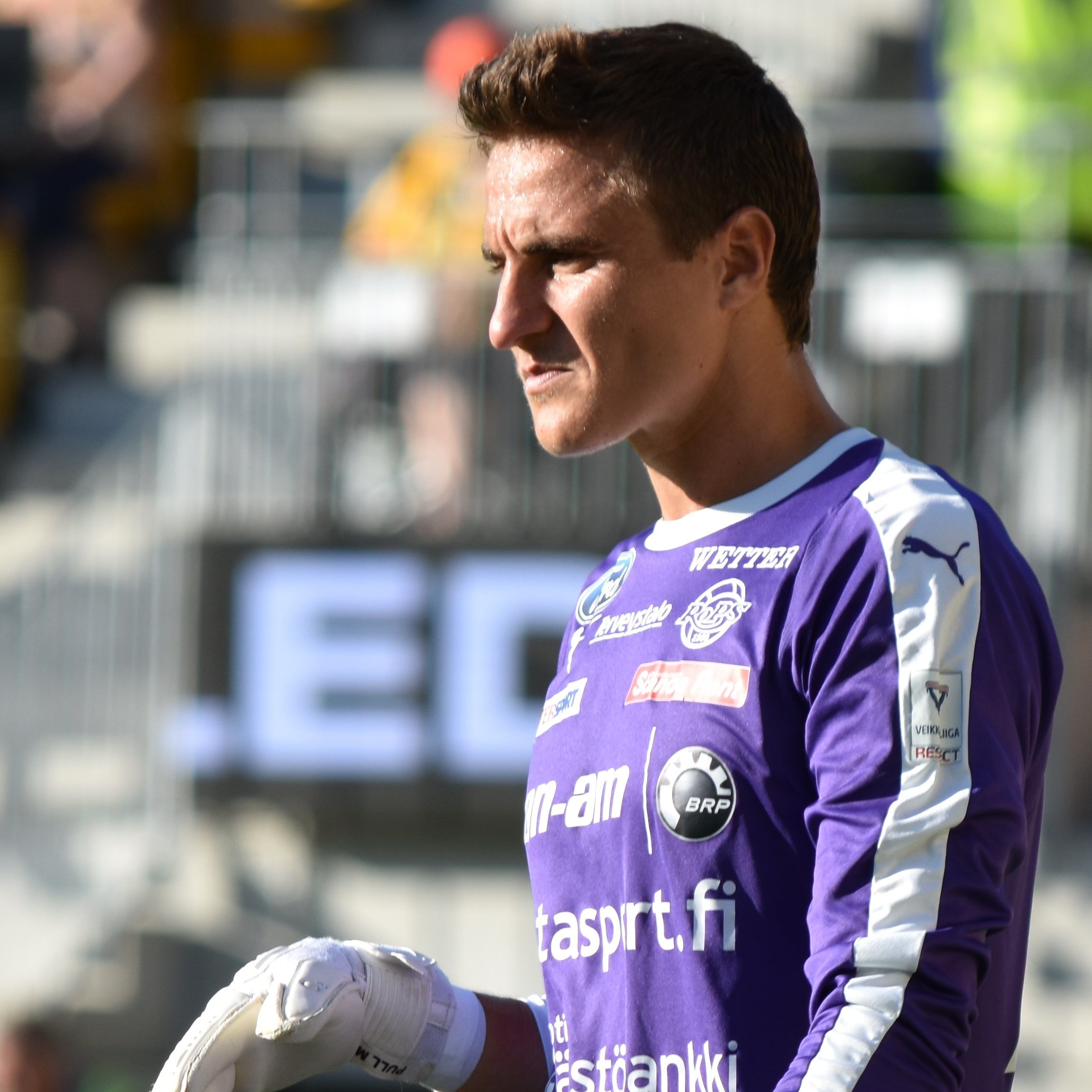
Antonio Reguero played 162 matches for RoPS, HJK Helsinki and FC Lahti.

- Fran Álvarez – KTP – 2021
- Chema Antón – SJK – 2017
- Sergi Arimany – SJK – 2017
- Asier Arranz – KTP – 2021
- Diego Bardanca – SJK – 2017
- Jagoba Beobide – RoPS – 2019
- Pablo Couñago – FC Honka, PK-35 Vantaa – 2014, 2016
- Nando Cózar – HIFK – 2019
- Toni Doblas – HJK – 2014
- Jordan Domínguez – HJK – 2018
- Juanan Entrena – HIFK – 2021
- Juan Esnáider – KTP – 2021
- Martin Fernández – FC Honka – 2014
- Jose Galán – RoPS – 2016
- Héctor García – SJK – 2014
- Javi Hervás – FC Honka, FC Lahti – 2018–21
- Fernando Liñán – PK-35 Vantaa – 2016
- Sergio Llamas – RoPS – 2019
- Carlos López – SJK – 2014
- Borjas Martín – FC Honka – 2018–20
- Mika – KTP – 2023
- Mateo Míguez – PK-35 Vantaa – 2016
- Aimar Moratalla – SJK – 2016
- Carlos Moros Gracia – HJK – 2024
- Álvaro Muñiz – FC Inter – 2019–20
- Derik Osede – Inter Turku – 2024
- Rubén Palazuelos – FC Honka – 2013
- Ibán Parra – Tampere United – 2000
- Carlos Portela – FC Honka, PK-35 Vantaa – 2014, 2016
- Josu Prieto – SJK, FC Lahti – 2014, 2019
- Antonio Reguero – RoPS, HJK, FC Lahti – 2016–2022
- Ricky – FC Jazz – 1998
- Joel Rodríguez – FC Inter Turku – 2022
- Ruxi – AC Oulu, FC Inter – 2021–2022
- Pipe Sáez – HIFK – 2021–2022
- Alejandro Sanz – FC Inter – 2021
- Rober Sierra – FC Inter Turku – 2022
- Abel Suárez – FC Honka – 2019
- Francis Suárez – FC Inter – 2014
- Yerai Couñago – FC Honka, PK-35 Vantaa – 2014, 2016

== Sudan ==
- Jusif Ali – Ilves, HIFK, Lahti – 2018, 2021–2022, 2023
- Patrick Peter – TPS – 2004

== Suriname ==
- Marciano Boumann – HJK, TP-Seinäjoki – 1997
- Gleofilo Vlijter – VPS – 2024

== Sweden ==
- Alibek Aliev – FF Jaro – 2015
- Filip Almström-Tähti – IFK Mariehamn – 2021
- Emil Andersson – IFK Mariehamn – 2013
- **Kofi Asare – Inter Turku** – 2025–
- Pontus Åsbrink – IFK Mariehamn – 2018
- Anders Bååth – SJK – 2018
- Gustaf Backaliden – IFK Mariehamn, SJK, VPS – 2019–22
- Arash Bayat – IFK Mariehamn – 2008
- Simon Bengtsson – AC Oulu – 2024
- Ludwig Bergström – IFK Mariehamn – 2012
- David Carlsson – IFK Mariehamn, HJK, FF Jaro – 2005–08, 2014–15
- Johan Carlsson – IFK Mariehamn – 2005–10
- Admir Catovic – KuPS, VPS – 2014–15
- Hasan Cetinkaya – FC Jazz – 1999
- Kristopher Da Graca – HJK Helsinki, KuPS – 2023, 2024
- Ousmane Diawara – KuPS – 2024
- **Emir El-Kathemi – IFK Mariehamn** – 2025–
- Örjan Engström – FF Jaro – 1998
- Björn Enqvist – VPS – 1999–2000
- **William Eskelinen – AC Oulu** – 2025–
- Bobbie Friberg da Cruz – IFK Mariehamn – 2014–17
- Andreas Friman – IFK Mariehamn – 2008
- Mikael Göransson – VPS – 1999
- Anders Granberg – FF Jaro – 2002
- **Erik Gunnarsson – FF Jaro** – 2025–
- Kenneth Gustafsson – IFK Mariehamn – 2009
- Mats Gustafsson – FC Inter, IFK Mariehamn – 1997, 1999–2007
- Felix Gustavsson – JJK – 2017
- Tarik Hamza – IFK Mariehamn – 2019–2020
- Elton Hedström – Ekenäs IF – 2024
- Philip Hellqvist – KuPS – 2021
- Benjamin Hjertstrand – Ekenäs IF – 2024
- Björn Hofvendahl – MyPa, FC Lahti – 1998–99
- Olof Hvidén-Watson – KTP – 2008
- Josef Ibrahim – IFK Mariehamn – 2013–16
- **Samouil Izountouemoi – Jaro** – 2025–
- Joakim Jensen – FC Inter, HJK – 1999–2005
- Daniel Johansson – IFK Mariehamn – 2007
- **Jardell Kanga – Ilves** – 2025–
- Robert Kjellin – FC Lahti – 2000
- Andreas Kristoffersson – FC Inter – 2000
- **Manasse Kusu – FF Jaro** – 2025–
- Erik Lantto – VPS – 2000
- Adam Larsson – Ilves, IFK Mariehamn – 2022–2023, 2024
- Mathias Larsson – VPS – 1999
- Alexander Leksell – Ekenäs IF – 2024
- **Pontus Lindgren – IFK Mariehamn** – 2025–
- **Albin Linnér – KTP** – 2025–
- **Oscar Linnér – KTP** – 2025–
- **Kevin Lund – IFK Mariehamn** – 2025–
- Hampus Lönn – IFK Mariehamn – 2019
- Peter Magnusson – HJK – 2010
- Rickson Mansiamina – HIFK – 2016
- Nicklas Maripuu – IFK Mariehamn – 2018
- David Mikhail – FC Lahti – 2024
- **Marokhy Ndione – AC Oulu** – 2025–
- Mathias Nilsson – IF Gnistan – 2024–
- Daniel Norrmén – IFK Mariehamn – 2005–08
- Simon Nurme – IFK Mariehamn – 2012–14
- Marcus Olofsson – IFK Mariehamn – 2009–12
- Daniel Örlund – HJK – 2015
- Robin Östlind – IFK Mariehamn – 2012–14
- Cesar Pacha – FC Lahti, KuPS – 2001, 2003
- Alexandros Pappas – IFK Mariehamn – 2009
- Gabriel Petrovic – IFK Mariehamn – 2006, 2016–18
- Moses Reed – IFK Mariehamn – 2008
- Filip Rogić – HJK Helsinki – 2023
- **Vilmer Rönnberg – VPS** – 2025–
- Magnus Samuelsson – FC Lahti – 2002
- Gabriel Sandberg – KTP – 2023
- Erik Sandvärn – IFK Mariehamn – 2005–07
- Robbin Sellin – IFK Mariehamn – 2017
- Simon Silverholt – IFK Mariehamn – 2018–19
- Philip Sparrdal Mantilla – IFK Mariehamn – 2015–18
- Björn Stringheim – VPS – 1998–2000
- Calle Svensson – IFK Mariehamn – 2021
- Nils Svensson – HJK Helsinki – 2024
- Jakob Tånnander – FC Haka, HJK – 2020–21
- Richard Teberio – FC Inter – 1999–2004
- Erik Törnros – PS Kemi, FC Lahti – 2016, 2019
- Sebastian Wiklander – IFK Mariehamn – 2005
- Mattias Wiklöf – IFK Mariehamn – 2008, 2012–13

== Switzerland ==
- Magnus Breitenmoser – AC Oulu – 2021–2023
- Jean-Pierre La Placa – AC Allianssi – 2005
- Stefan Marinkovic – FC Inter – 2014

== Togo ==
- Haymenn Bah-Traoré – FC Haka – 2023–2024
- Kuami Agboh – MyPa – 2007–08
- Henri Eninful – FC Lahti – 2020–21

== Trinidad and Tobago ==
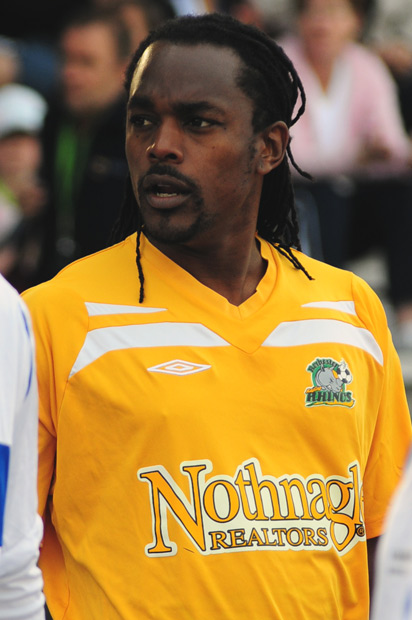
Brent Sancho played one match for MYPA

- Daniel Carr – RoPS – 2020
- Aubrey David – FF Jaro, PS Kemi, VPS – 2014, 2017–18
- Akil DeFreitas – FF Jaro – 2012
- Jamal Gay – RoPS – 2014
- Ataullah Guerra – RoPS – 2013
- Anthony Herbert – FC Haka – 2022–2023
- Joevin Jones – HJK – 2014
- Stefan de Las – MyPa – 2010
- Kareem Moses – VPS – 2022
- **Andre Raymond – Ilves** – 2025–
- Brent Sancho – MyPa – 1999
- Rundell Winchester – PS Kemi – 2016
- Shahdon Winchester – FF Jaro, SJK – 2013–14, 2018

== Tunisia ==
- Ady – TPS, MyPa – 2005–07, 2009–10

== Turkey ==
- Berkant Güner – VPS – 2018
- Senol Kök – FC Jokerit – 2001
- Ugur Özder – PS Kemi – 2018
- Fuat Usta – FC Jokerit – 2001
- Sükrü Uzuner – Finnairin Palloilijat, HJK, KTP, Atlantis FC – 1998–1999, 2001
- Kasim Yildiz – AC Allianssi – 2005

== Uganda ==
- Robert Kakeeto – HIFK – 2019
- Martin Mutumba – FC Inter – 2005–07
- Ibra Sekajja – AC Oulu – 2022
- Yunus Sentamu – Ilves – 2016

== Ukraine ==
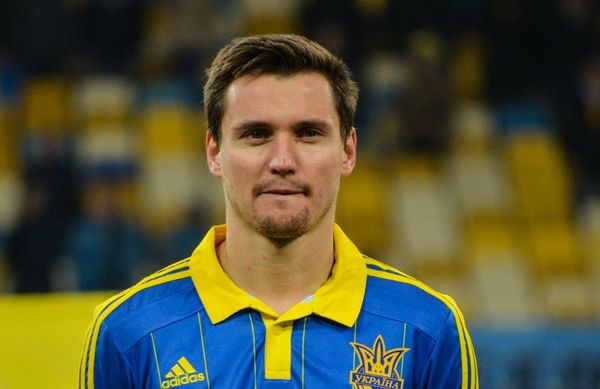
Denys Oliynyk played 94 matches for SJK Seinäjoki

- Andriy Androsov – FC Oulu – 1994
- Denys Balanyuk – IFK Mariehamn – 2021
- Dmytro Bilonog – IFK Mariehamn – 2020
- Sergiy Bozhko – Ilves – 1994
- Dmytro Brovkin – AC Oulu – 2007
- Denis Kostintshuk – VPS – 2002
- Igor Levchenko – IFK Mariehamn – 2018
- Roman Mirošnytšenko – TP-47 – 2004
- Denys Oliynyk – SJK – 2018–2022
- Serhiy Omelyanovych – AC Allianssi – 2005
- Mykola Pavlenko – RoPS – 2008
- Dmytro Pronevych – IFK Mariehamn – 2009
- Igor Saveljev – FC Oulu – 1994
- Serhiy Shpak – FF Jaro – 2011
- Andriy Telesnenko – FC Oulu – 1992
- Irakli Tsykolia – AC Oulu, RoPS – 2007–08
- Dmytro Voloshyn – IFK Mariehamn – 2009–10
- Ruslan Zanevsky – FF Jaro – 2007
- **Maksym Zhuk – KTP** – 2025–

== United States ==
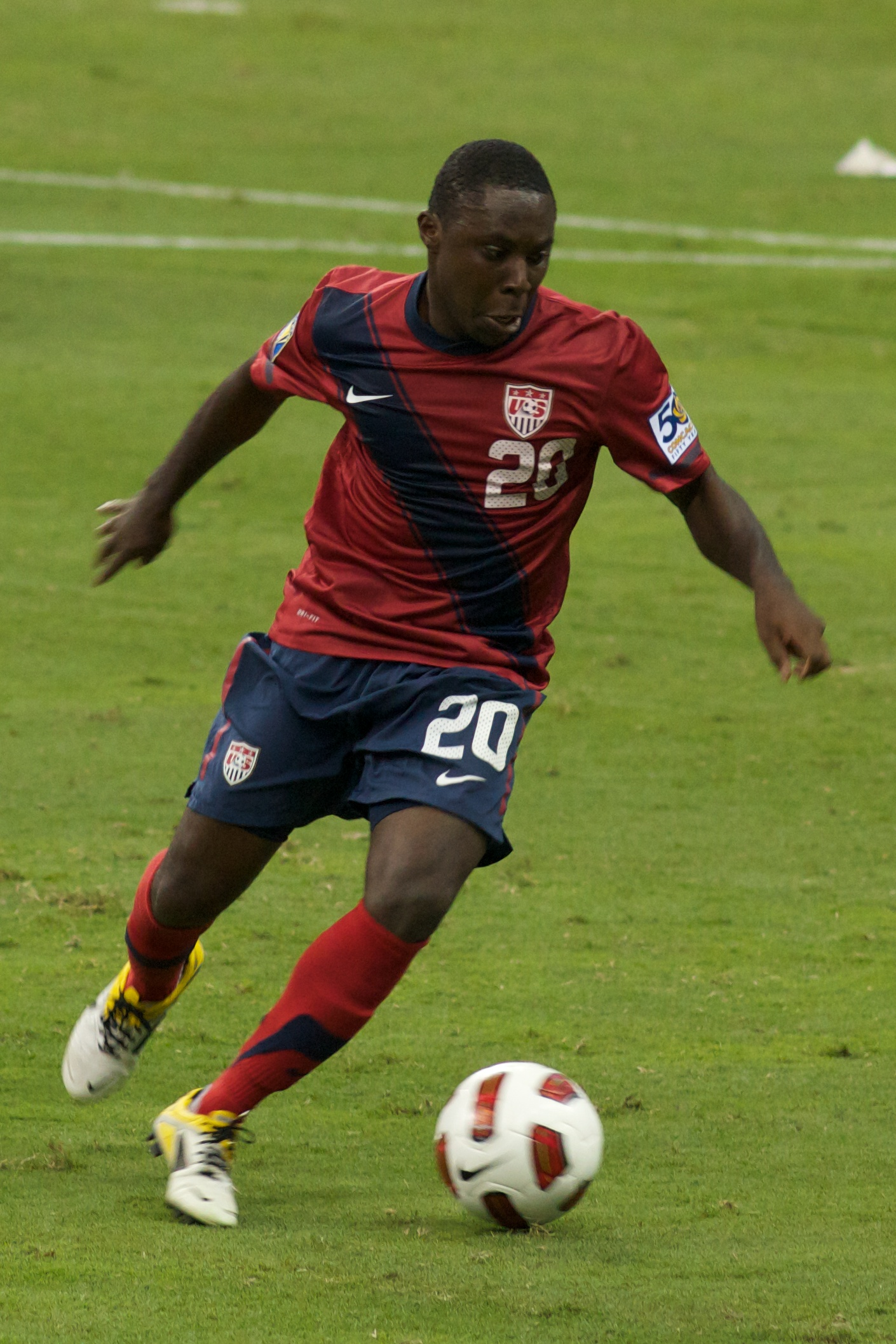
Freddy Adu played five matches for KuPS

- Dion Acoff – SJK – 2019
- Freddy Adu – KuPS – 2015
- Mike Banner – FF Jaro – 2012–13
- Tristan Bowen – KuPS – 2015
- Joe Broekhuizen – VPS – 2015
- Jacob Bushue – FC Haka – 2020–21
- Alex De John – TPS – 2014
- Jack de Vries - KTP – 2023
- Greg Eckhardt – VPS – 2010
- **Constantine Edlund – KTP Kotka** – 2025–
- Christian Eissele – PS Kemi – 2016
- Brandon Fonseca – PK-35 – 1998
- Michael Hartmann – FC Haka – 2020
- Craig Hill – KTP, KuPS – 2015–16
- Macario Hing-Glover – HIFK – 2019–2022
- Will John – RoPS – 2015–16
- AJ Marcucci – Gnistan – 2024
- Stephen McCarthy – KuPS – 2015
- **Benji Michel – HJK Helsinki** – 2025–
- Justin Moose – SJK – 2014
- Tim Murray – FC Honka – 2018–21
- Lamar Neagle – IFK Mariehamn – 2010
- Tony Odorisio – KTP – 2008
- Jon Okafor – MyPa – 2013
- Max Peterson – IFK Mariehamn – 2024
- **Justin Rennicks – AC Oulu – 2024–**
- Tyler Ruthven – KuPS – 2013
- Kevin Sawchak – MyPa – 2011
- Isaiah Schafer – VPS – 2015
- Jordan Seabrook – FC Haka, VPS – 2012–15
- Luis Silva – FC Honka – 2019
- Johann Smith – KuPS – 2012
- Karsten Smith – VPS – 2013
- Lawrence Smith – VPS – 2009
- Brian Waltrip – Tampere United – 2000
- Josh Wicks – IFK Mariehamn – 2011

== Uruguay ==
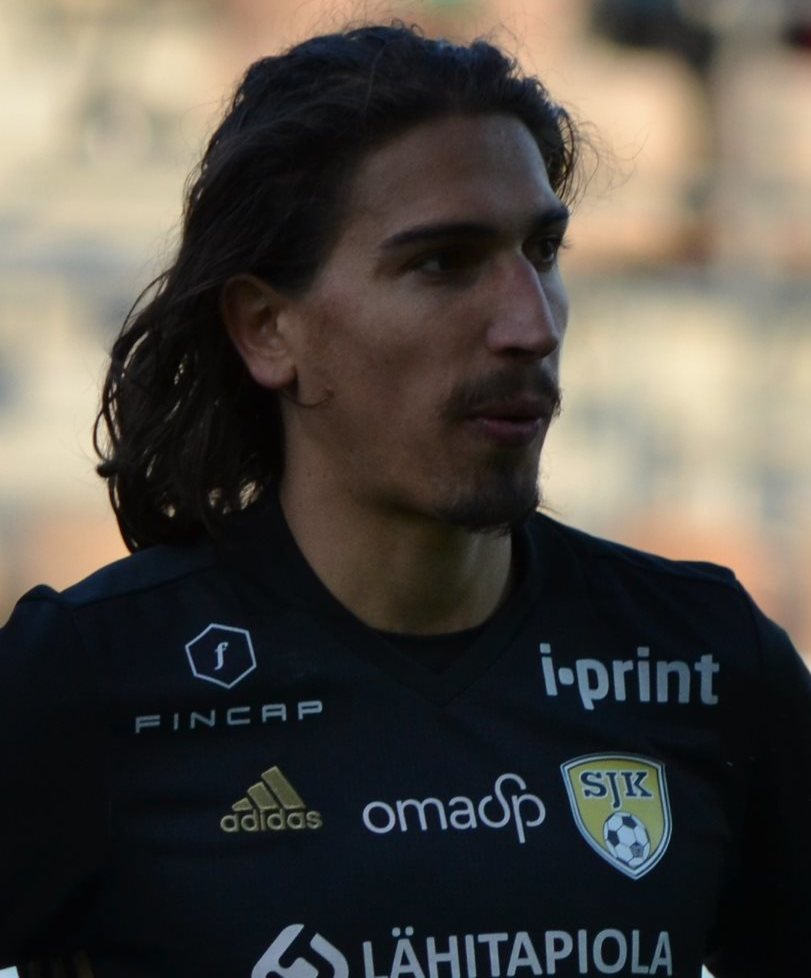
Facundo Guichón played 13 matches for SJK Seinäjoki.

- Luis Curbelo – TPS – 1996–97
- Facundo Guichón – SJK – 2017
- Álvaro Méndez – FC Jazz – 1997
- Pablo Muñiz – HJK – 2005
- César Pellegrin – RoPS – 2005
- Walter Surraco – TPS – 2005–06

== Venezuela ==
- Daniel Carrillo – KuPS – 2021–2022
- **Elías Romero – FC Haka** – 2025–

== Wales ==
- John Allen – Mikkelin Palloilijat, RoPS, TPS, MyPa, TPV – 1990–99
- **Danny Barrow** – **AC Oulu** – 2023–
- Richard Dorman – SJK – 2014–18
- Mark Joseph – Ilves – 1993–96
- Josh Pritchard – FC Honka – 2014

== Zambia ==
- Godfrey Chibanga – RoPS – 2009
- Jackson Chileshe – RoPS – 2008–09
- Dabid Chilufya – RoPS – 1998–2001
- George Chilufya – RoPS – 1990–2001, 2005
- Clive Hachilensa – IFK Mariehamn – 2007
- Kenny Katala – RoPS – 2001
- Stephen Kunda – RoPS – 2008–09
- Mordon Malitoli – RoPS – 1997–2001
- Christopher Musonda – RoPS – 2009
- Silvester Musonda – RoPS – 1998
- Chanda Mwaba – RoPS – 2008–09
- Nchimunya Mweetwa – RoPS – 2008–09
- Zeddy Saileti – RoPS – 1994–2001, 2004–05, 2008–09
- Musole Sakulanda – RoPS – 2001
- Whiteson Simwanza – RoPS – 2009
- Emmanuel Siwale – RoPS, TP-Seinäjoki – 1994–95, 1997
- Harrison Tembo – RoPS – 1997
- Dominic Yobe – AC Oulu – 2007, 2010
- Donewell Yobe – AC Oulu – 2010

== Zimbabwe ==
- Lucky Mkosana – IFK Mariehamn – 2017
- Admiral Muskwe – IFK Mariehamn – 2025
- **Prosper Padera – SJK Seinäjoki** – 2025–

== Notes ==
1. Born in Belgium
2. Born in Bosnia and Herzegovina
3. Born in Bosnia and Herzegovina (then part of Yugoslavia)
4. Born in Belarus
5. Born in Brazil
6. Born in Botswana
7. Born in Canada
8. Born in Ivory Coast
9. Born in Cameroon
10. Born in the Czech Republic (then part of Czechoslovakia)
11. Born in England
12. Born in Finland
13. Born in France
14. Born in Guinea-Bissau
15. Born in Georgia (then part of the Soviet Union)
16. Born in Germany
17. Born in Ghana
18. Born in Guinea
19. Born in Greece
20. Born in Guyana
21. Born in Iran
22. Born in Israel
23. Born in Jamaica
24. Born in Kenya
25. Born in Liberia
26. Born in Morocco
27. Born in Malta
28. Born in the Netherlands
29. Born in Northern Ireland
30. Born in Portugal
31. Born in Russia
32. Born in Russia (then part of the Soviet Union)
33. Born in Saudi Arabia
34. Born in Senegal
35. Born in Spain
36. Born in Serbia (then part of Yugoslavia)
37. Born in Suriname
38. Born in Sweden
39. Born in Switzerland
40. Born in Ukraine
41. Born in Ukraine (then part of the Soviet Union)
42. Born in the United States
43. Born in the Democratic Republic of Congo (then Zaïre)
44. Born in Zimbabwe
45. Capped for the Armenia national under-21 football team
46. Capped for the Armenia national football team
47. Capped for the England national under-16 football team
48. Capped for the England national under-17 football team
49. Capped for the England national under-18 football team
50. Capped for the England national under-19 football team
51. Capped for the England national under-20 football team
52. Capped for the Finland national under-16 football team
53. Capped for the Finland national under-17 football team
54. Capped for the Finland national under-18 football team
55. Capped for the Finland national under-19 football team
56. Capped for the Finland national under-20 football team
57. Capped for the Finland national under-21 football team
58. Capped for the Finland national football team
59. Capped for the France national under-21 football team
60. Capped for the France national football team
61. Capped for the Galicia national football team
62. Capped for the Georgia national under-17 football team
63. Capped for the Georgia national under-19 football team
64. Capped for the Georgia national under-21 football team
65. Capped for the Germany national under-15 football team
66. Capped for the Germany national under-16 football team
67. Capped for the Guyana national football team
68. Capped for the Kazakhstan national football team
69. Capped for the Netherlands national under-19 football team
70. Capped for the Netherlands national under-21 football team
71. Capped for the Norway national under-18 football team
72. Capped for the Norway national under-17 football team
73. Capped for the Philippines national football team
74. Capped for the Poland national under-15 football team
75. Capped for the Poland national under-17 football team
76. Capped for the Poland national under-18 football team
77. Capped for the Portugal national under-16 football team
78. Capped for the Portugal national under-17 football team
79. Capped for the Portugal national under-18 football team
80. Capped for the Portugal national under-19 football team
81. Capped for the Portugal national under-20 football team
82. Capped for the Sweden men's national under-17 football team
83. Capped for the Sweden men's national under-19 football team
84. Capped for the Sweden national under-21 football team
85. Capped for the Sweden men's national football team
86. Capped for the Turkey national under-15 football team
87. Capped for the Turkey national under-21 football team
88. Capped for the Turkmenistan national football team
89. Capped for the Ukraine national under-21 football team

== Sources ==
- Veikkausliiga player archive 1990–2013
- Finnish Football Association/Veikkausliiga
