= 1998–99 Manchester United F.C. season =

English football club season

Manchester United
1998–99 season
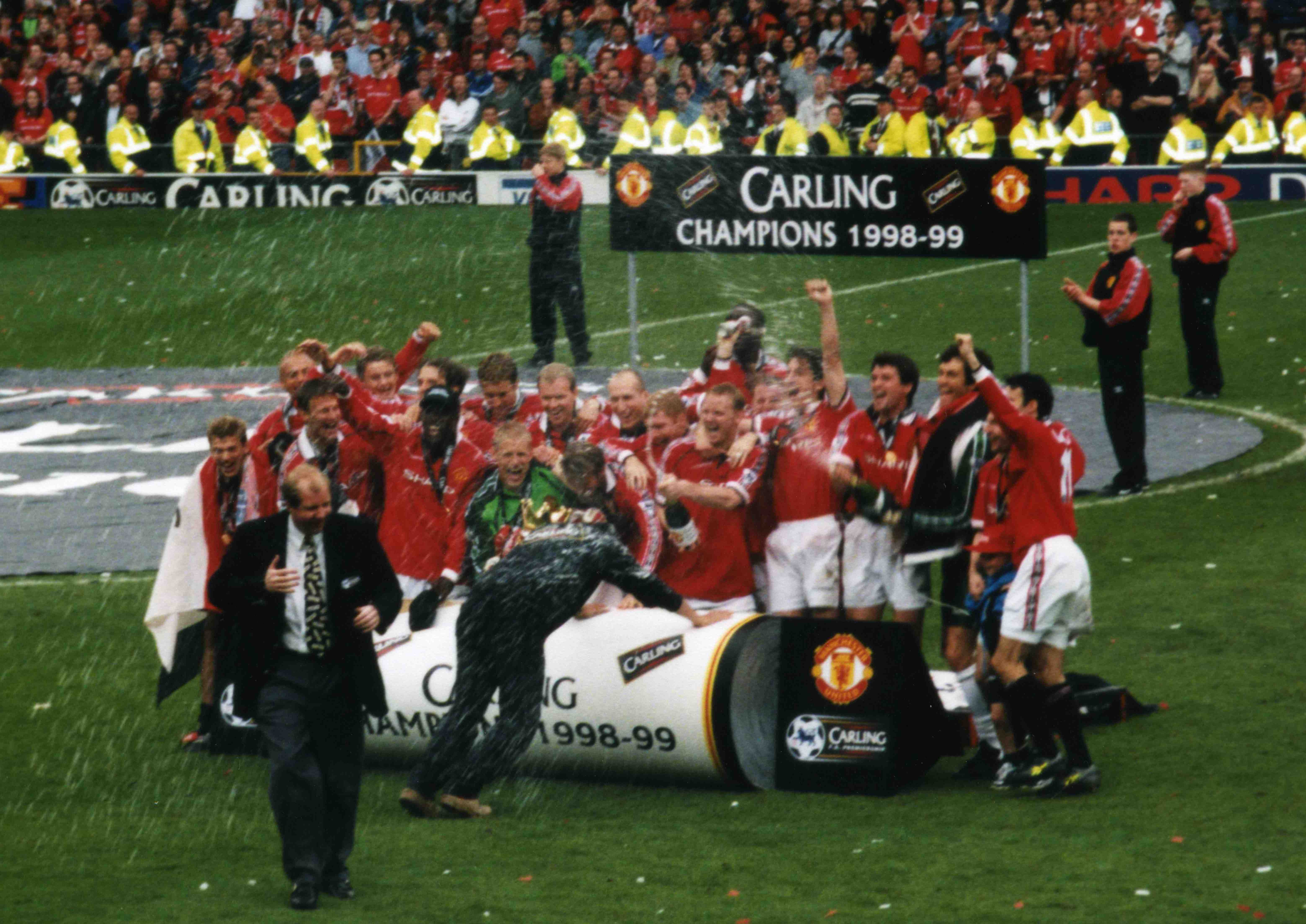
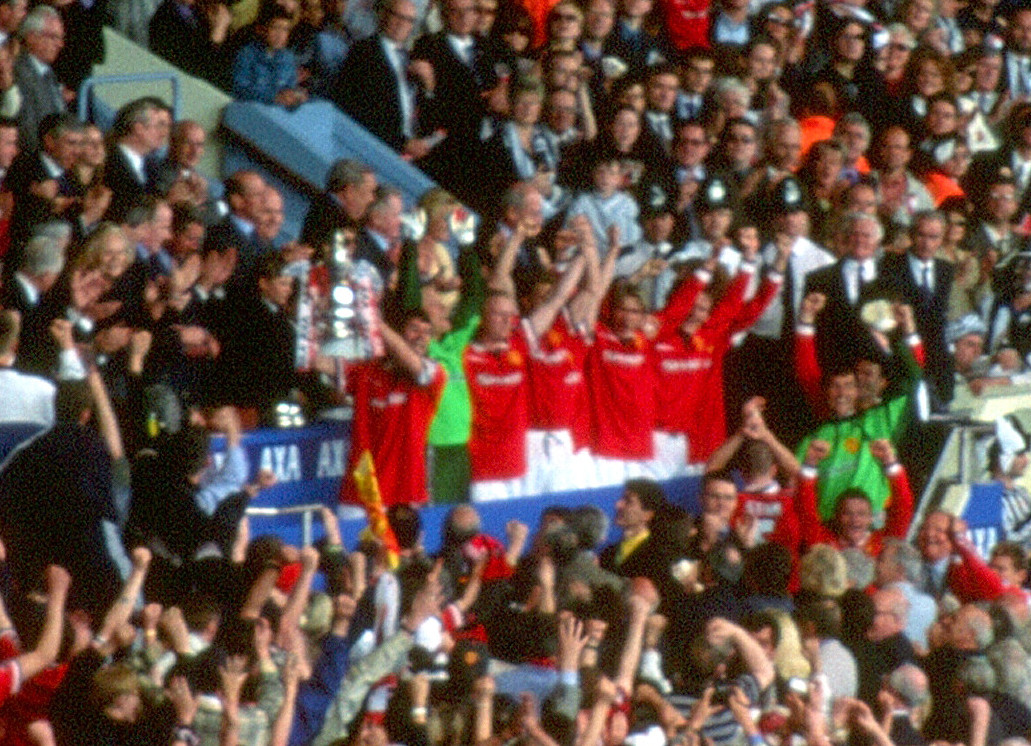
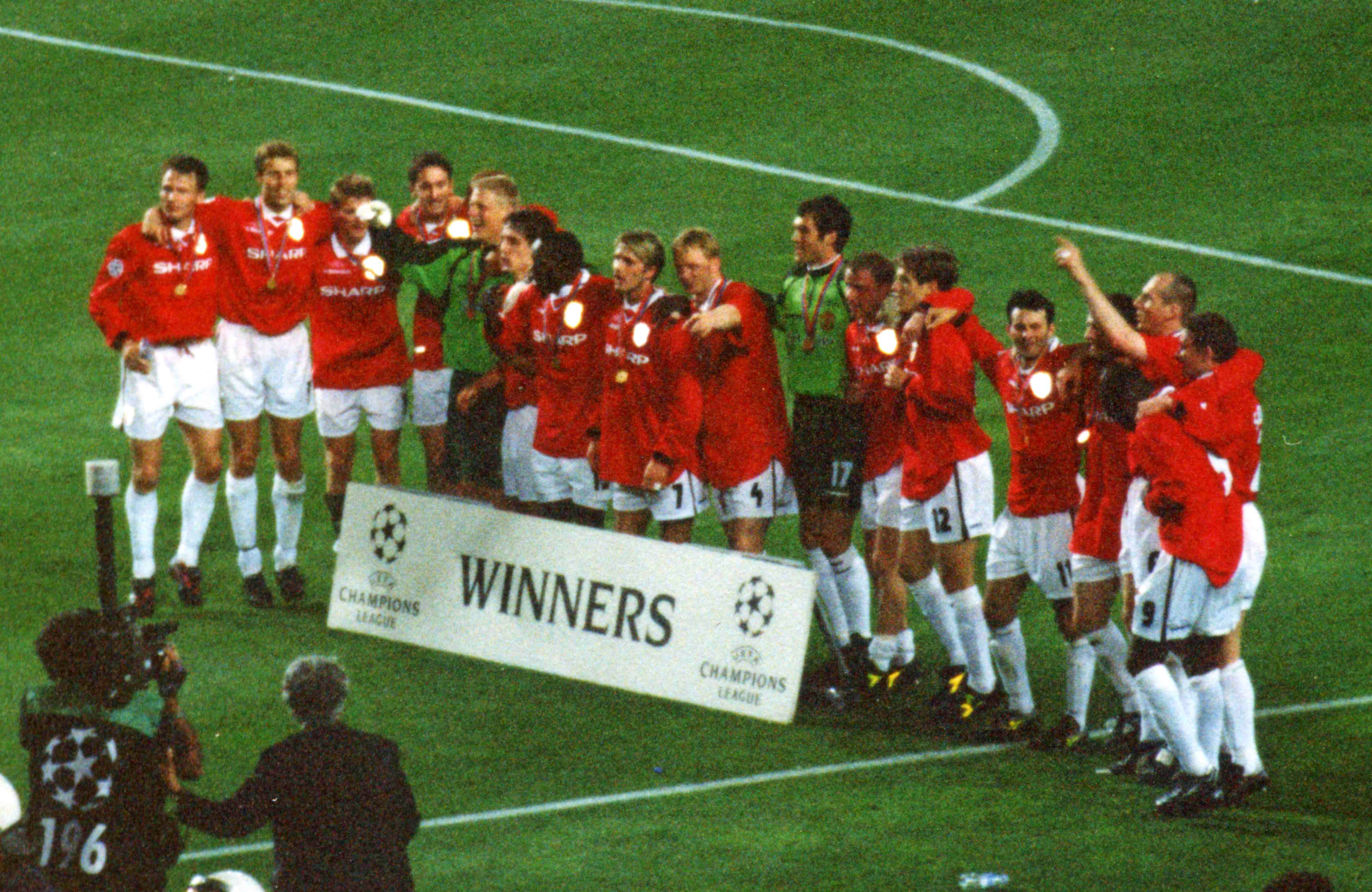
- Manchester United's treble-winning side celebration of winning the Premier League (top left), FA Cup (top right), and Champions League (bottom).
- Chairman: Martin Edwards
- Manager: Alex Ferguson
- FA Premier League: 1st
- FA Cup: Winners
- League Cup: Quarter-finals
- UEFA Champions League: Winners
- Charity Shield: Runners-up
- Top goalscorer: League: Dwight Yorke (18); All: Dwight Yorke (29)
- Highest home attendance: 55,316 vs Southampton (27 February 1999)
- Lowest home attendance: 37,237 vs Nottingham Forest (11 November 1998)
- Average home league attendance: 55,188
Home colours	Away colours	Third colours

The 1998–99 season was Manchester United Football Club's seventh season in the FA Premier League and their 24th consecutive season in the top division of English football. After finishing the previous season without winning any trophies, United won the Treble of the Premier League, FA Cup, and UEFA Champions League in 1998–99, the first side in English football to do so. During the campaign, United lost only five times: in the Charity Shield against Arsenal; in the fifth round of the League Cup against eventual winners Tottenham Hotspur; and three times in the league, including their only home loss all season, against Middlesbrough in December 1998. A run of 33 games unbeaten in all competitions began on 26 December at home to Nottingham Forest, whom they beat 8–1 away from home in February 1999. The season was characterised by comebacks, including the FA Cup fourth round against Liverpool, the semi-finals of the Champions League against Juventus, and the Champions League final, when Teddy Sheringham and Ole Gunnar Solskjær scored in injury time to overturn Bayern Munich's early lead.

Veteran players Gary Pallister and Brian McClair had left the club before the season began, but their replacements, Dutch defender Jaap Stam from PSV Eindhoven and Trinidadian striker Dwight Yorke from Aston Villa, were both signed for club record fees. In November 1998, goalkeeper Peter Schmeichel announced his intention to leave the club after eight years at Old Trafford, joining Sporting CP at the end of the season. The club was subjected to a takeover bid of more than £600 million from British Sky Broadcasting early in the season, but it was blocked by the Monopolies and Mergers Commission in March 1999.

Fans and writers regard the Treble as manager Alex Ferguson's greatest achievement. In recognition of his success, Ferguson was awarded a knighthood and handed the Freedom of the City of Glasgow in November 1999. David Beckham was named UEFA Club Footballer of the Year for the 1998–99 season, and was runner-up to Rivaldo for 1999's Ballon d'Or and FIFA World Player of the Year awards. As of 2025, the Treble has only been matched once by an English club: by local rivals Manchester City in the 2022–23 season.

== Background ==
Manchester United started the previous season by winning the Charity Shield. However, despite having a 12-point lead above second-placed Arsenal by the start of March, while having played three more matches, Arsenal's eight successive victories, paired with United's 1–0 loss against Arsenal at Old Trafford, meant that United finished second to them in the Premier League by a margin of one point. United exited both the FA Cup in the Fifth Round to Barnsley 3–2 in a replay, and the Champions League to Monaco in the quarter-finals on away goals. Ipswich Town, who were in the second-tier First Division at the time, defeated them 1–0 in the League Cup Third Round.

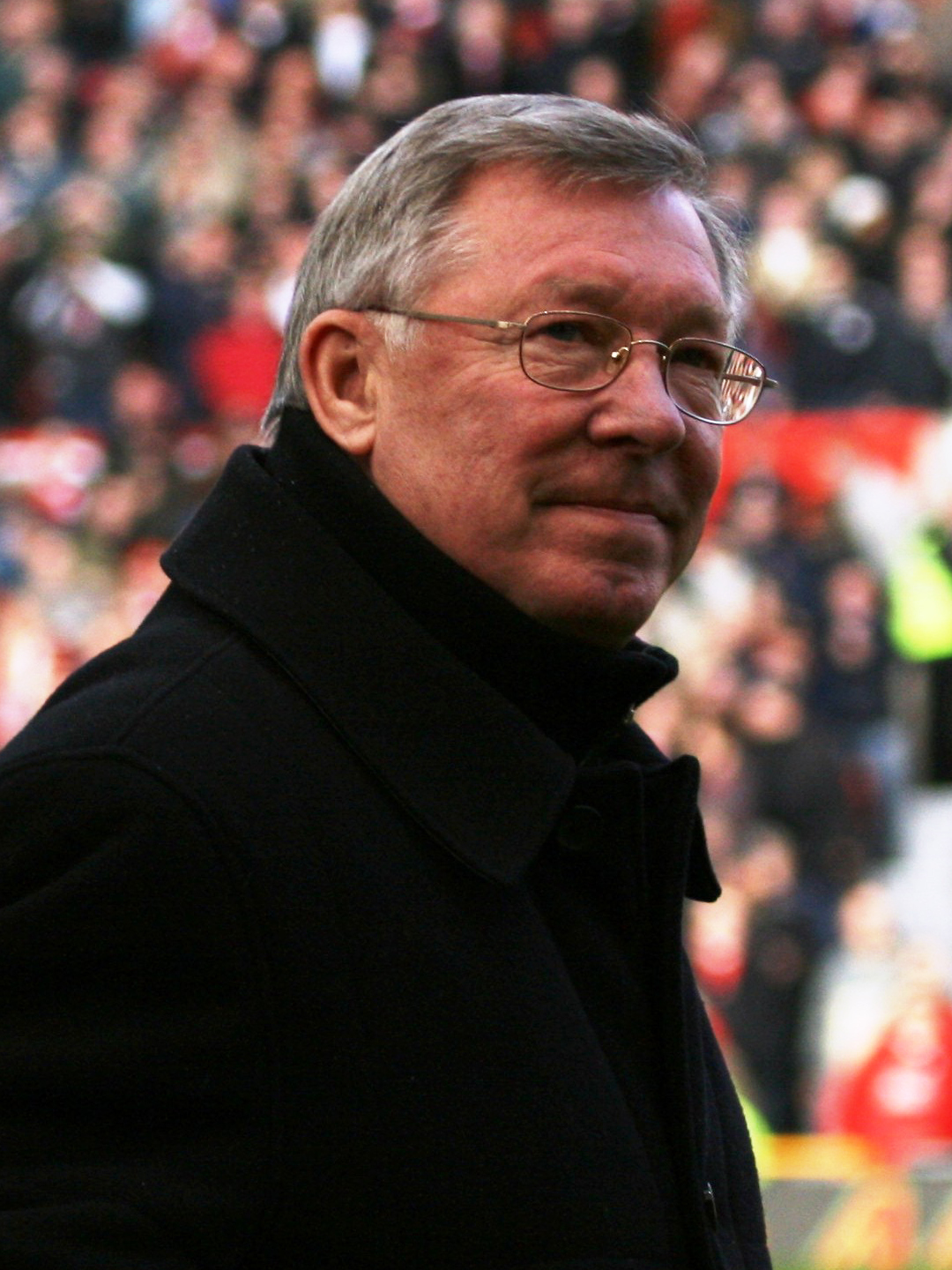
Alex Ferguson was the manager of Manchester United from 1986 to 2013.

Ahead of the 1998–99 season, Martin Edwards, the chief executive of the club, questioned manager Alex Ferguson's commitment to the club, who had almost left the club after chairman Roland Smith sent him a letter. Edwards told the Daily Mail:

We hadn't won anything and to be honest we were dissatisfied. We wondered if Alex [Ferguson] had taken his eye off the ball a little and if his celebrity status and interest in horses had maybe not helped. So we told him our feelings and Roland [Smith] thought we should follow it up with a letter. He received it and came pretty much straight back in to see me. He was furious, saying: 'If that's what you think of me then get stuffed... I am resigning'. And off he went.

== Pre-season and friendlies ==
Manchester United played four pre-season games ahead of the 1998–99 campaign. After losing 4–3 away to Birmingham City, they toured Scandinavia for three matches, starting with a 2–2 draw against Vålerenga, before comprehensive wins over Brøndby (6–0) and Brann (4–0). After the season began, they played a friendly against a European XI selected by former striker Eric Cantona as a 40-year memorial to the Munich air disaster; Cantona played for both teams during the match, which Manchester United won 8–4. A testimonial for Teddy Scott was scheduled against Aberdeen at Pittodrie in January; United lost 7–6 on penalties after a 1–1 draw in 90 minutes.

Date	Opponents	H / A	Result F–A	Scorers	Attendance
25 July 1998	Birmingham City	A	3–4	Mulryne (3) 21', 38', 56' (pen.)	20,708
27 July 1998	Vålerenga	A	2–2	Scholes 12', Solskjær 14'	19,700
31 July 1998	Brøndby	A	6–0	Sheringham (2) 33', 71', Scholes 44', Cole (2) 66', 84', Cruyff 90'	27,022
4 August 1998	Brann	A	4–0	Irwin (3) 43', 44' (pen.), 55' (pen.), Cole 82'	16,100
18 August 1998	European XI (Note: Squad selected by Eric Cantona.)	H	8–4	P. Neville, Butt, Scholes, Giggs, Cantona, Cruyff, Notman (2)	55,121
18 January 1999	Aberdeen	A	1–1 (6–7p)	Johnsen 51'	21,500

Colours: Green = Manchester United win; Yellow = draw; Red = opponents win.

== FA Charity Shield ==
The Charity Shield is played between the previous year's Premier League winner and the FA Cup winner, or the league runners-up if a club won both the league and the FA Cup. Manchester United, as league runners-up, faced the previous season's Double winners Arsenal on 9 August 1998 at Wembley Stadium in front of a crowd of 67,342. Goals from Marc Overmars, Christopher Wreh, and Nicolas Anelka left United losing the game 3–0. Roy Keane made his comeback after almost a year out injured and Jaap Stam made his debut for United.

Date	Opponents	H / A	Result F–A	Scorers	Attendance
9 August 1998	Arsenal	N	0–3		67,342

== FA Premier League ==
The Premier League is the top division of English league football. 20 clubs play against each other twice, with one match played in a club's stadium and the other in the opponent's stadium. Three points are awarded for a win, one point for a draw, and none for a loss. At the end of the season, the top two teams qualified for next year's UEFA Champions League, the third-placed team qualified for the qualifying rounds of the Champions League, the fourth-placed team qualified for the UEFA Cup, and the bottom three teams were relegated to the Football League First Division.

=== August–October ===
In the first match of the season, Manchester United faced Leicester City at Old Trafford and went a goal down within seven minutes, when Emile Heskey turned in Muzzy Izzet's cross via the crossbar. Tony Cottee – the scorer in the previous season's corresponding fixture – added a second with 15 minutes remaining. A long-range shot from David Beckham deflected in off Teddy Sheringham three minutes later, before Beckham himself scored with a direct free kick to salvage a point for the home side. The team's first away game followed at West Ham United, but despite the debut of striker Dwight Yorke, United were held to a goalless draw. Beckham, who had become a national hate figure after his dismissal at the World Cup, was poorly received by West Ham supporters, with his every touch of the ball jeered. Bottles and stones were directed at the team bus prior to kick-off. After the game, Ferguson, his players, and the Manchester United staff refused to be interviewed by the press or television.

Manchester United recorded their first win of the season on 9 September, beating newly promoted Charlton Athletic 4–1. Yorke and Ole Gunnar Solskjær each scored a brace to overturn the visitors' early lead. Old Trafford was covered in graffiti against the proposed takeover of the club by BSkyB. Chants were directed at chairman Martin Edwards, who had given his support to the merger. The following week, ahead of their midweek UEFA Champions League group stage visit against Barcelona, United earned a 2–0 victory against Coventry City, thanks to goals from Yorke and Ronny Johnsen. However, a 3–0 defeat to defending champions Arsenal left the team in 10th place after five matches, with Arsenal winning against United in four consecutive matches; goals from Tony Adams, Nicolas Anelka, and Freddie Ljungberg condemned Manchester United to their second 3–0 defeat by Arsenal in the season. Midfielder Nicky Butt, who had been sent off in the Champions League match earlier in the week, was handed a second red card in the space of four days for a foul on Patrick Vieira. After the match, Alex Ferguson admitted that his team was inferior to Arsenal, and later called their performance "depressing". United ended the month with a win, beating rivals Liverpool 2–0 to move into fifth spot, with Denis Irwin scoring a penalty and Paul Scholes scoring a cross from Andy Cole.

A trip to face Southampton at The Dell on 3 October was taken with caution, given United's return from Munich in the Champions League and poor record on the ground: United had lost to Southampton on each of their last three visits, including a 6–3 defeat in 1996. Cole was paired with Yorke for only the second time in the season, a tactic that paid off as both got on the scoresheet. Substitute Jordi Cruyff added a third in the 75th minute to move United into second place in the table, four points behind leaders Aston Villa. An international break followed the game, pausing club football for two weeks. Upon their return, Raimond van der Gouw, who deputised for injured goalkeeper and captain Peter Schmeichel at Southampton, featured again at home to Wimbledon, a match that Manchester United won 5–1, the biggest win of the season at Old Trafford. Ryan Giggs, Beckham, Yorke, and Cole all scored, with Cole scoring twice; Ferguson, in particular, hailed the contribution of 19-year-old defender Wes Brown. United earned a point away at Derby County on 24 October, with Cruyff scoring a late equaliser for United following Darryl Powell's goal, and beat Everton 4–1 at Goodison Park on 31 October to cut the gap at the top to just a point.

=== November–December ===
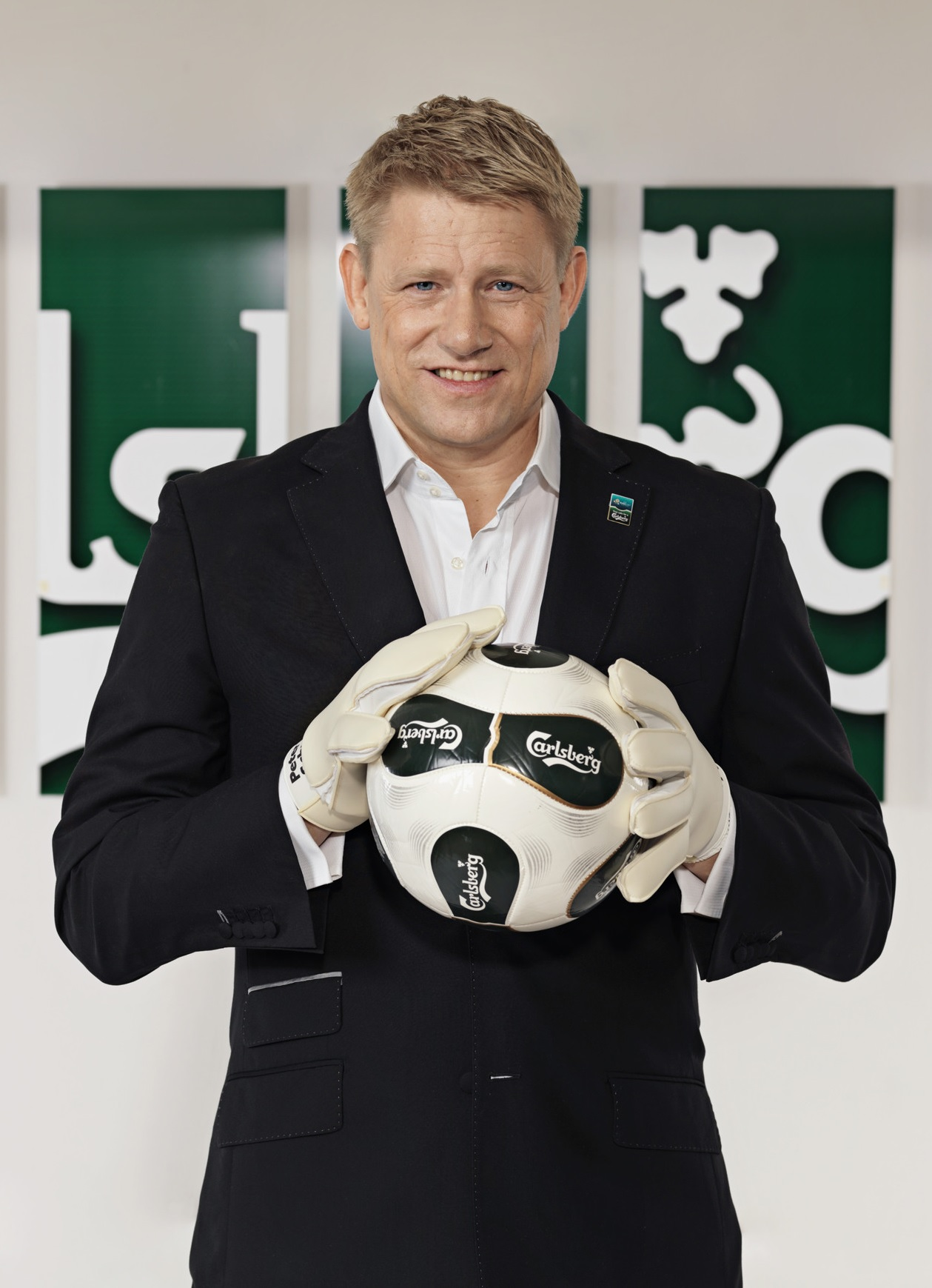
Peter Schmeichel, Manchester United's captain and main goalkeeper during the season.

Manchester United failed to score in a goalless draw against Newcastle United, but made amends with a 3–2 victory over the bottom team, Blackburn Rovers. Defensive frailties, most notably from Schmeichel, who had announced his intention to leave Manchester United at the end of the season, were on show away to Sheffield Wednesday as the team missed the chance to go top of the table, losing 3–1. A brace from winger Niclas Alexandersson and a debut goal scored by Wim Jonk consigned Ferguson to his second defeat in the league and extended a barren run at Hillsborough: United had won only a single game in their last eight league visits. On 29 November, Manchester United hosted Leeds United; Leeds opened the scoring with just under half an hour played, but a goal either side of half-time gave United the lead. Leeds equalised in the 52nd minute, Butt scored after receiving the ball from Phil Neville and spinning around, securing three points for United.

Three straight draws followed in December, the first away to league leaders Aston Villa. United were fortunate to pick up a point given their opponents' dominance in the second half. At the match against Tottenham Hotspur, United surrendered a 2–0 lead: Solskjær put United two goals ahead, but in the 39th minute, Gary Neville received a red card for a second bookable offence, tugging on David Ginola's shirt. Spurs captain Sol Campbell brought his team back into the match with 20 minutes remaining and powered a header into the top left-hand corner just before full-time. Ferguson refused to comment after the match. Despite losing the lead, the result put United top of the league on goal difference ahead of Aston Villa, before they faced Arsenal the following day.

Four days later, United missed the chance to lead the table again as Chelsea drew at Old Trafford: despite Chelsea not having a good chance at scoring until the 25th minute, United surrendered a 1–0 lead with a Gianfranco Zola goal from a Gustavo Poyet pass in the 81st minute, following a goal by Cole from "the unlikliest of positions" in the stoppage time of first half. Manchester United, who were without their manager Ferguson for the Middlesbrough game due to family bereavement, were beaten 3–2; it was their last defeat of the season. Having failed to keep a clean sheet since 8 November, The Independent declared that United would not win the league, citing a shallow squad. Ferguson returned on 26 December, as the team collected their only win in the month of December against Nottingham Forest by beating them 3–0, including two goals from Ronny Johnsen and a goal from Giggs. United's last match of 1998 was a goalless draw at Stamford Bridge, two weeks after the reverse fixture, to solidify their position in the top four.

=== January–February ===
A power failure at Old Trafford, caused by "unprecedented demand for electricity," delayed the match against West Ham on 10 January by 45 minutes, a match that ended 4–1 to Manchester United. The partnership of Yorke and Cole was evident in the 6–2 win at Leicester City: five goals were scored in the second half, including two goals each for Yorke and Cole and defender Jaap Stam's only goal for the club, cutting Chelsea's lead at the top to two points. On 31 January, Manchester United moved a point clear at the top of the league for the first time in the season. Yorke's late header in the 89th minute made the 1–0 victory at Charlton Athletic their third consecutive league win and their fifth in January. Ferguson praised the team's resolve, adding, "It's a good result for us, because there are games where you have to dig in and find a result."

In February, the winning streak was extended to five matches, with a 1–0 victory at home to Derby County on 3 February to move four points ahead of Chelsea, followed by an 8–1 win against Nottingham Forest at the City Ground; after Yorke and Cole had scored two goals each, Ole Gunnar Solskjaer came off the bench and scored four times in the space of ten minutes to record the biggest away win in Premier League history, a record that stood for 20 years until Leicester City beat Southampton 9–0 in 2019. Ron Atkinson, the manager of Nottingham Forest and Alex Ferguson's predecessor as Manchester United manager, declared Manchester United to be the best team in the league by "a country mile". During the home match against Arsenal on 17 February, the Gunners were without Dennis Bergkamp, Emmanuel Petit, and Martin Keown. Arsenal conceded an early penalty when Ray Parlour brought down Johnsen, but Yorke missed, shooting wide of the right-hand post. They scored early in the second half as Nwankwo Kanu's through-ball found striker Anelka, who put Arsenal into the lead. Cole just after the hour mark drew the game level, and Arsenal conceded their first goal in the league since 13 December. From then on, United had several chances to win the game, but a point each left the title race finely balanced. Back-to-back wins, starting with a 1–0 victory at Coventry on 20 February, followed by a 2–1 win at home to Southampton a week later, maintained United's grip on the top spot.

=== March–May ===
Cup duties were the main priority in March as United played only two league fixtures: away to Newcastle and at home to Everton. United won both games, including two goals by Cole against his former club Newcastle, and three second-half goals in a 3–1 win against Everton.

Manchester United could only manage a 1–1 draw at Wimbledon on 3 April as Beckham's well-drilled shot cancelled out Jason Euell's opener in the fifth minute. Despite several of the first-team members being rested for the Juventus tie, United won 3–0 at Old Trafford against Sheffield Wednesday and drew against Leeds to earn a point at Elland Road after the midweek tie at Juventus. However, the result allowed Arsenal to move to the top of the table for the first time in the season, albeit having played one game more, after scoring six against Middlesbrough at the Riverside.

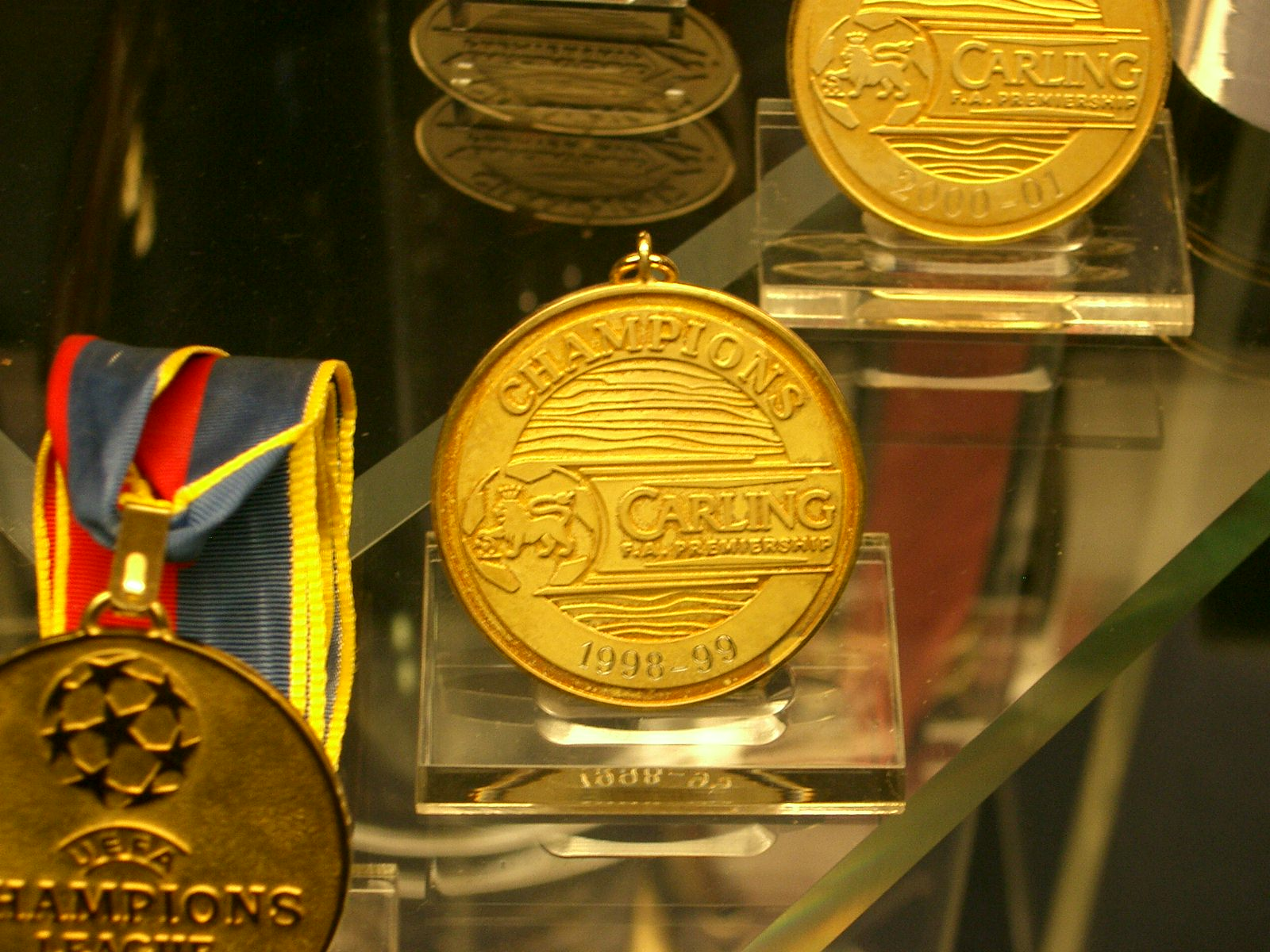
Premier League winner's medal at the Manchester United museum.

Another victory over Aston Villa on 1 May put United back on top of the league, but Arsenal's win at Derby the next day restored the champions' advantage. Against Liverpool at Anfield, Ferguson restored the Cole–Yorke strike partnership; the latter scored the opener from a Beckham cross. In the second half, United were awarded a penalty for a challenge on Jesper Blomqvist by Jamie Carragher, which Denis Irwin successfully converted; however, Irwin was sent off in the 75th minute for a second bookable offence, after Jamie Redknapp scored through a controversial penalty to give Liverpool hope. Former United midfielder Paul Ince scored the equaliser in the 88th minute. The United manager did not hide his discomfort, adding that he thought "the referee handed it to them". On the same night, Arsenal convincingly beat rivals Tottenham to move three points clear, having still played a game more, although Wenger admitted that United were marginal favourites.

With three games remaining, Yorke scored the only goal of the game away at Middlesbrough, helping his team return to the top of the table. Two days later, Arsenal lost to Leeds 1–0 with Jimmy Floyd Hasselbaink's late winner, requiring United to earn four points in the final two games to secure the title. A goalless draw at Ewood Park earned United a point, in the process relegating Blackburn Rovers, who were managed by former United assistant manager Brian Kidd. This result meant that the title would be decided on the final day, as it had been in 1995. On the final day, Manchester United secured the championship, their fifth in seven seasons, after Les Ferdinand had put Tottenham ahead, Beckham and Cole scored either side of half-time to give United a 2–1 win that rendered Arsenal's victory over Aston Villa irrelevant.

=== Matches ===
Date	Opponents	H / A	Result F–A	Scorers	Attendance	League position
15 August 1998	Leicester City	H	2–2	Sheringham 79', Beckham 90'	55,052	7th
22 August 1998	West Ham United	A	0–0		26,039	11th
9 September 1998	Charlton Athletic	H	4–1	Solskjær (2) 39', 63', Yorke (2) 45', 48'	55,147	9th
12 September 1998	Coventry City	H	2–0	Yorke 20', Johnsen 48'	55,193	5th
20 September 1998	Arsenal	A	0–3		38,142	10th
24 September 1998	Liverpool	H	2–0	Irwin 19' (pen.), Scholes 80'	55,181	5th
3 October 1998	Southampton	A	3–0	Yorke 12', Cole 60', Cruyff 75'	15,251	2nd
17 October 1998	Wimbledon	H	5–1	Cole (2) 19', 88', Giggs 45', Beckham 47', Yorke 52'	55,265	2nd
24 October 1998	Derby County	A	1–1	Cruyff 86'	30,867	2nd
31 October 1998	Everton	A	4–1	Yorke 14', Short 23' (o.g.), Cole 59', Blomqvist 64'	40,079	2nd
8 November 1998	Newcastle United	H	0–0		55,174	3rd
14 November 1998	Blackburn Rovers	H	3–2	Scholes (2) 31', 59', Yorke 43'	55,198	2nd
21 November 1998	Sheffield Wednesday	A	1–3	Cole 29'	39,475	2nd
29 November 1998	Leeds United	H	3–2	Solskjær 45', Keane 46', Butt 78'	55,172	2nd
5 December 1998	Aston Villa	A	1–1	Scholes 47'	39,241	2nd
12 December 1998	Tottenham Hotspur	A	2–2	Solskjær (2) 11', 18'	36,079	1st
16 December 1998	Chelsea	H	1–1	Cole 45'	55,159	2nd
19 December 1998	Middlesbrough	H	2–3	Butt 62', Scholes 70'	55,152	3rd
26 December 1998	Nottingham Forest	H	3–0	Johnsen (2) 28', 60', Giggs 62'	55,216	4th
29 December 1998	Chelsea	A	0–0		34,741	4th
10 January 1999	West Ham United	H	4–1	Yorke 10', Cole (2) 40', 68', Solskjær 81'	55,180	3rd
16 January 1999	Leicester City	A	6–2	Yorke (3) 10', 64', 86', Cole (2) 50', 62', Stam 90'	22,091	3rd
31 January 1999	Charlton Athletic	A	1–0	Yorke 89'	20,043	1st
3 February 1999	Derby County	H	1–0	Yorke 65'	55,174	1st
6 February 1999	Nottingham Forest	A	8–1	Yorke (2) 2', 67', Cole (2) 7', 50', Solskjær (4) 80', 88', 90', 90+1'	30,025	1st
17 February 1999	Arsenal	H	1–1	Cole 61'	55,171	1st
20 February 1999	Coventry City	A	1–0	Giggs 79'	22,596	1st
27 February 1999	Southampton	H	2–1	Keane 80', Yorke 84'	55,316	1st
13 March 1999	Newcastle United	A	2–1	Cole 25', 51'	36,776	1st
21 March 1999	Everton	H	3–1	Solskjær 55', G. Neville 64', Beckham 67'	55,182	1st
3 April 1999	Wimbledon	A	1–1	Beckham 44'	26,121	1st
17 April 1999	Sheffield Wednesday	H	3–0	Solskjær 34', Sheringham 45', Scholes 62'	55,270	1st
25 April 1999	Leeds United	A	1–1	Cole 55'	40,255	2nd
1 May 1999	Aston Villa	H	2–1	Watson 20' (o.g.), Beckham 47'	55,189	2nd
5 May 1999	Liverpool	A	2–2	Yorke 22', Irwin 57' (pen.)	44,702	2nd
9 May 1999	Middlesbrough	A	1–0	Yorke 45'	34,665	1st
12 May 1999	Blackburn Rovers	A	0–0		30,436	1st
16 May 1999	Tottenham Hotspur	H	2–1	Beckham 43', Cole 48'	55,189	1st

Colours: Green = Manchester United win; Yellow = draw; Red = opponents win.

=== Table ===
Pos	Team	Pld	W	D	L	GF	GA	GD	Pts	Qualification or relegation
1	Manchester United (C)	38	22	13	3	80	37	+43	79	Qualification for the Champions League first group stage
2	Arsenal	38	22	12	4	59	17	+42	78	Qualification for the Champions League first group stage
3	Chelsea	38	20	15	3	57	30	+27	75	Qualification for the Champions League third qualifying round
4	Leeds United	38	18	13	7	62	34	+28	67	Qualification for the UEFA Cup first round
5	West Ham United	38	16	9	13	46	53	−7	57	Qualification for the Intertoto Cup third round

Source: Premier League
Rules for classification: 1) points; 2) goal difference; 3) number of goals scored.
(C) Champions

== FA Cup ==
The FA Cup is the primary knockout cup competition in England, with each round consisting of a single match. The opponent and the venue of the match before the semi-finals were drawn randomly before each match. If a match is drawn, it would be replayed, typically at the venue of the away club of the first game. Premier League clubs are given a bye to the Third Round.

Despite receiving a home draw in each of their first four rounds, United were paired against difficult opponents throughout the competition. En route to the final, they defeated four Premier League teams: Middlesbrough, Liverpool, Chelsea, and Arsenal. The only team from outside the top flight that United played in the competition was Fulham, who at the time played in the Second Division, the third tier of English football, although they claimed wins over Premier League sides Southampton and Aston Villa in the previous rounds.

In the Third Round, United were drawn against Middlesbrough, who had beaten them in the league less than a month prior. Andy Townsend gave Middlesbrough the lead early in the second half, but goals from Cole, Irwin, and Giggs gave United a 3–1 victory. United faced Liverpool at home in the following round, where the visitors took the lead from a Michael Owen header inside three minutes. In spite of creating plenty of goal-scoring chances, the team failed to equalise until the 86th minute, when Yorke scored after a Beckham free kick was headed into his path by Cole inside the six-yard box. In the second minute of stoppage time, Solskjær hit a shot through the legs of Liverpool defender Jamie Carragher that beat goalkeeper David James at his near post to give United the win.

In the Fifth Round, Cole scored the only goal of the match in the 25th minute against Fulham to set up a quarter-final clash at home to Chelsea. Although there were no goals, Scholes and Roberto Di Matteo were both sent off in the Sixth Round and missed the replay three days later at Stamford Bridge. Yorke scored two goals against the Blues in the replay, scoring United's 100th goal of the season.

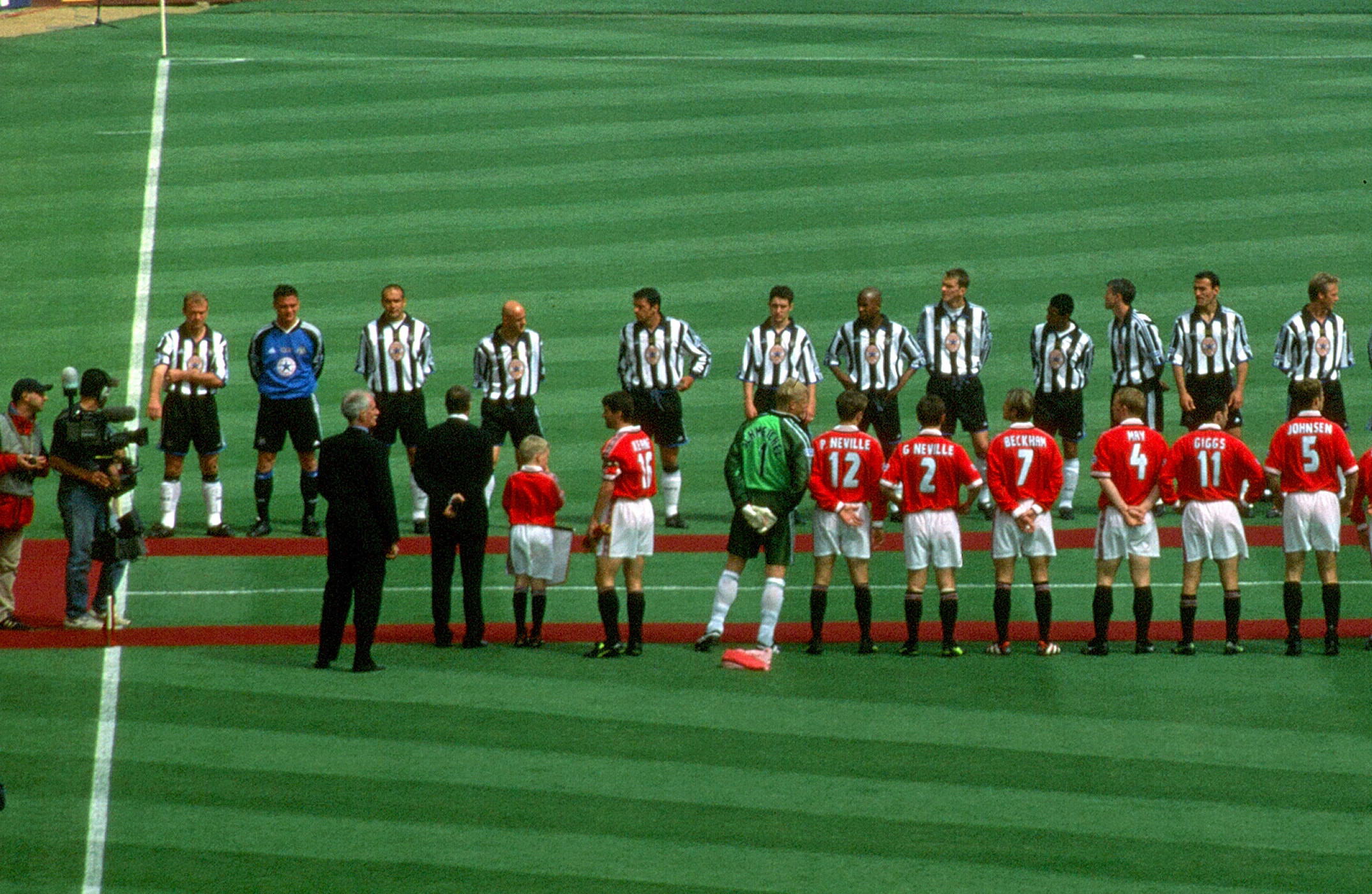
Players of Manchester United and Newcastle United lining up for the 1999 FA Cup final.

Manchester United played cup holders Arsenal in the semi-final at Villa Park on 11 April. Neither team was able to score even after extra time had been played, although Keane had a goal ruled out in the first half for a controversial offside decision against Yorke in the build-up, and Nelson Vivas was sent off for Arsenal. In the replay four days later, Beckham opened the scoring for United with a long-range effort, but Dennis Bergkamp drew Arsenal level with a shot that deflected off United's centre back Jaap Stam. Arsenal then thought they had taken the lead when Nicolas Anelka put the ball in the back of United's net, but the goal was ruled out for offside. United's captain, Roy Keane, was red-carded for two bookable offences and United played the last half-hour of normal time with 10 men. In injury time at the end of the second half, Phil Neville fouled Ray Parlour in the penalty area. Peter Schmeichel parried away Bergkamp's resultant penalty, and the game went into extra time. Giggs scored partway through the second half of extra time. Picking up possession on the halfway line after a loose pass from Patrick Vieira, he dribbled past the entire Arsenal back line before shooting just under goalkeeper David Seaman's bar. Giggs ran celebrating towards the United fans, and United held on to beat the Gunners 2–1.

Manchester United met Newcastle United in the final at Wembley Stadium, the penultimate FA Cup final to be held there before it was closed for rebuilding. Less than 10 minutes into the match, Keane was injured and replaced by Sheringham. Scholes and Sheringham both finished with a goal apiece in the 2–0 win that sealed the double.

Date	Round	Opponents	H / A	Result F–A	Scorers	Attendance
3 January 1999	Third Round	Middlesbrough	H	3–1	Cole 68', Irwin 82' (pen.), Giggs 90'	52,232
24 January 1999	Fourth Round	Liverpool	H	2–1	Yorke 88', Solskjær 90'	54,591
14 February 1999	Fifth Round	Fulham	H	1–0	Cole 26'	54,798
7 March 1999	Sixth Round	Chelsea	H	0–0		54,587
10 March 1999	Sixth Round replay	Chelsea	A	2–0	Yorke (2) 4', 59'	33,075
11 April 1999	Semi-final	Arsenal	N	0–0 (a.e.t.)		39,217
14 April 1999	Semi-final replay	Arsenal	N	2–1 (a.e.t.)	Beckham 17', Giggs 109'	30,223
22 May 1999	Final	Newcastle United	N	2–0	Sheringham 11', Scholes 52'	79,101

Colours: Green = Manchester United win; Yellow = draw; Red = opponents win.

== Football League Cup ==
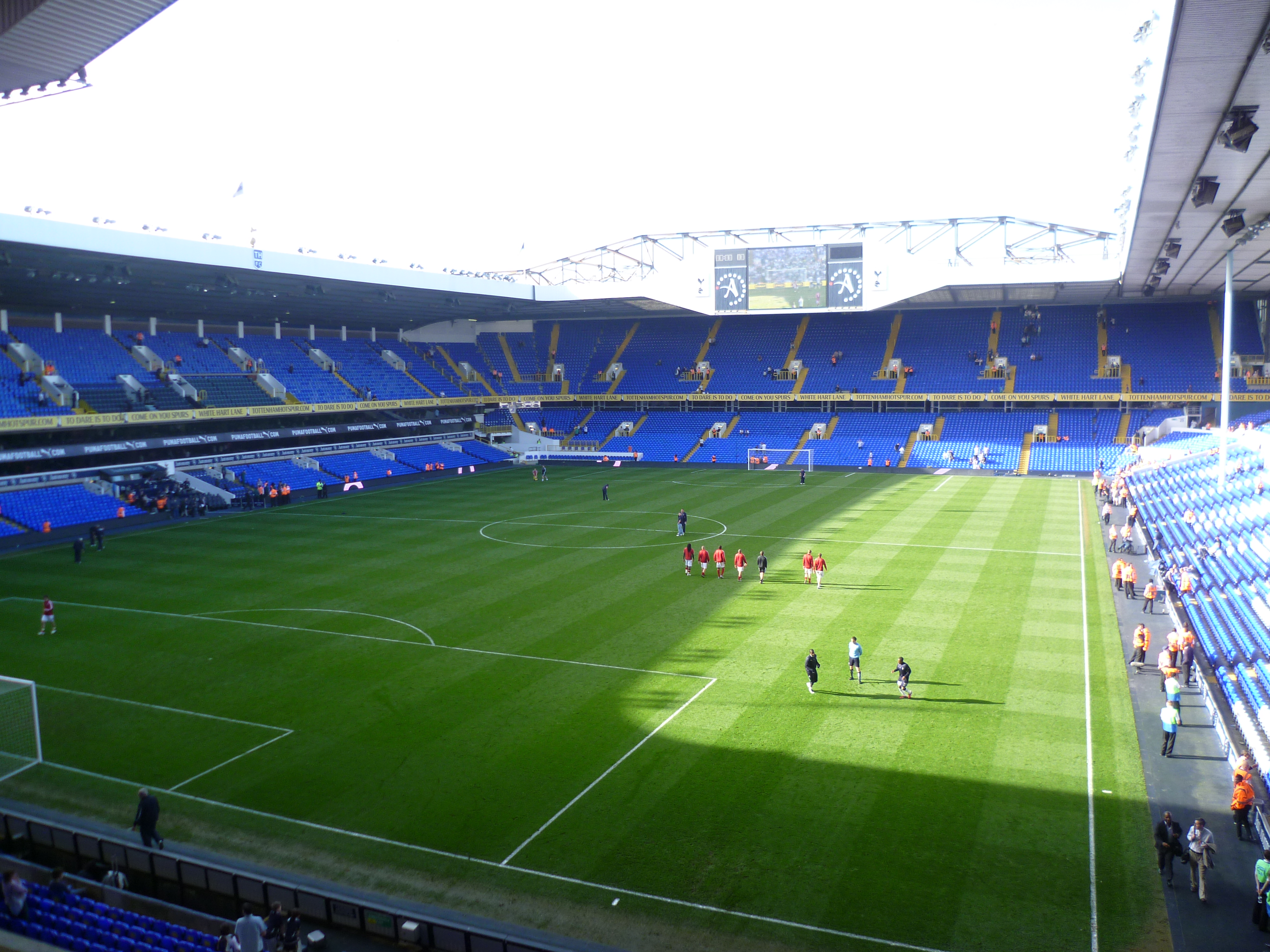
White Hart Lane, the stadium of the quarter-final match against Tottenham Hotspur.

The Football League Cup is a cup knockout competition open to clubs in the Premier League and the Football League; clubs participating in European competitions are given a bye to the Third Round, while other Premier League clubs are given a bye to the Second Round. In previous seasons, Ferguson used the League Cup as an opportunity to provide first-team experience to their younger players and reserves, while resting many of their first-team players. Ferguson has previously suggested reducing the number of fixtures in the League Cup.

In the third round of the competition, Ferguson started the game with just one player from the starting players against Derby in the league. United required extra time to defeat Bury, eventually winning 2–0 with goals from Erik Nevland and Ole Gunnar Solskjær. In the fourth round, two more goals from Solskjær gave United a 2–1 victory over Nottingham Forest, earning them a place in the quarter-finals for the first time since they reached the final in 1994. United were beaten in the quarter-finals by eventual winners Tottenham Hotspur: two goals from Chris Armstrong and one from David Ginola gave Spurs a 3–1 victory, despite Ferguson starting Ryan Giggs and Teddy Sheringham following their injuries, with ex-Spurs striker Sheringham scoring the consolation for United on his return to White Hart Lane.

Date	Round	Opponents	H / A	Result F–A	Scorers	Attendance
28 October 1998	Third Round	Bury	H	2–0 (a.e.t.)	Solskjær 106', Nevland 115'	52,495
11 November 1998	Fourth Round	Nottingham Forest	H	2–1	Solskjær (2) 57', 60'	37,337
2 December 1998	Fifth Round	Tottenham Hotspur	A	1–3	Sheringham 70'	35,702

Colours: Green = Manchester United win; Yellow = draw; Red = opponents win.

== UEFA Champions League ==
The club used a different home kit for European matches.

The UEFA Champions League is the primary continental tournament organised by UEFA. It consists of two qualifying rounds, a group stage, and a knockout round. This was the second season that runners-up of a national league could enter the competition; prior to the 1997–98 season, only champions from the previous year's national leagues could enter the competition. However, clubs qualifying this way (including Manchester United) must enter the competition in the second qualifying round.

=== Second qualifying round ===
Manchester United began their UEFA Champions League campaign as a seeded team against Polish champions ŁKS Łódź in the second qualifying round. The loser of the two-legged round was transferred to the first round of the UEFA Cup. Goals from Giggs and Cole in the home leg gave them a 2–0 win, and a goalless second leg ensured their qualification for the group stage.

Date	Round	Opponents	H / A	Result F–A	Scorers	Attendance
12 August 1998	Second qualifying round First leg	ŁKS Łódź	H	2–0	Giggs 16', Cole 81'	50,906
26 August 1998	Second qualifying round Second leg	ŁKS Łódź	A	0–0		8,000

Colours: Green = Manchester United win; Yellow = draw; Red = opponents win.

=== Group stage ===
The group stage of the Champions League consists of six groups of four teams. Teams play against each other twice in each group, once at home and once away. At the end of the group stage, the winners of each group, as well as the two best runners-up, advanced to the knockout phase. United were drawn in Group D, labelled the competition's "group of death", along with Spanish champions Barcelona, German champions Bayern Munich, and Danish champions Brøndby.

Both games against Barcelona ended in draws. Despite Giggs, Scholes, and Beckham putting the team into a 3–2 lead at Old Trafford, the visitors were awarded a late penalty after Butt was sent off for handling the ball. Luis Enrique converted the ball into the net to leave both teams with a point each. In the return game on 25 November at the Camp Nou, a fixture that Barcelona needed to win to avoid elimination, Dwight Yorke's goals put United ahead 3–2, but Rivaldo equalized and nearly scored again, but his effort hit the crossbar.

United were denied victory by Bayern Munich twice, home and away. In Munich, the home side equalised with two minutes to go wi United leading 2–1, after Schmeichel went for and missed Bixente Lizarazu's throw-in, allowing Giovane Élber to tap in from a few yards out and score his second of the match. The return leg ended in a stalemate; Roy Keane scored just before half-time via a low header before Hasan Salihamidžić equalised for the visitors. United inflicted two heavy defeats on Brøndby, beating them 6–2 in Copenhagen and 5–0 at Old Trafford.

Results in the other groups meant United advance to the quarter-finals as runners-up of group D, joining winners Bayern Munich.

Date	Opponents	H / A	Result F–A	Scorers	Attendance	Group position
16 September 1998	Barcelona	H	3–3	Giggs 17', Scholes 25', Beckham 64'	53,601	3rd
30 September 1998	Bayern Munich	A	2–2	Yorke 30', Scholes 49'	53,000	3rd
21 October 1998	Brøndby	A	6–2	Giggs (2) 2', 21', Cole 28', Keane 55', Yorke 60', Solskjær 62'	40,315	1st
4 November 1998	Brøndby	H	5–0	Beckham 7', Cole 13', P. Neville 16', Yorke 28', Scholes 62'	53,250	1st
25 November 1998	Barcelona	A	3–3	Yorke (2) 25', 68', Cole 53'	67,648	2nd
9 December 1998	Bayern Munich	H	1–1	Keane 43'	54,434	2nd

Colours: Green = Manchester United win; Yellow = draw; Red = opponents win.

Pos	Team	Pld	W	D	L	GF	GA	GD	Pts	Qualification
1	(Germany) Bayern Munich	6	3	2	1	9	6	+3	11	Advance to knockout stage
2	(England) Manchester United	6	2	4	0	20	11	+9	10	Advance to knockout stage
3	(Spain) Barcelona	6	2	2	2	11	9	+2	8	
4	(Denmark) Brøndby	6	1	0	5	4	18	−14	3	

Source: UEFA

Ranking of second-placed teams

Pos	Grp	Team	Pld	W	D	L	GF	GA	GD	Pts	Qualification
1	C	(Spain) Real Madrid	6	4	0	2	17	8	+9	12	Advance to knockout stage
2	D	(England) Manchester United	6	2	4	0	20	11	+9	10	Advance to knockout stage
3	B	(Turkey) Galatasaray	6	2	2	2	8	8	0	8	
4	F	(Portugal) Benfica	6	2	2	2	8	9	−1	8	
5	E	(France) Lens	6	2	2	2	5	6	−1	8	
6	A	Croatia Zagreb	6	2	2	2	5	7	−2	8	

Source: RSSSF
Rules for classification: 1) Points; 2) Goal difference; 3) Goals scored; 4) Away goals scored; 5) Association coefficient; 6) Club coefficient.

=== Knockout phase ===
The knockout phase consists of the quarter-finals, the semi-finals, and the final. Each round (except for the final) is played over two legs, with one match at home and the other away. The final is a single match played on a neutral venue, which, for 1999, was Camp Nou in Barcelona, Spain. Manchester United played two Italian sides in the knockout phase: Internazionale quarter-finals and Juventus in the semi-finals; United had never won on an Italian pitch before the season.

In the quarter-finals, Beckham faced Diego Simeone for the first time since the 1998 World Cup. In the first leg at Old Trafford, United beat Inter 2–0 with two almost identical goals from Yorke, both from crosses by Beckham; Simeone's second-half goal was disallowed for pushing. At the San Siro, substitute Scholes scored a late away goal to level the game at 1–1, following a Nicola Ventola goal, as United advanced 3–1 on aggregate.

In the first leg of the semi-finals, Juventus's captain, Antonio Conte, met Edgar Davids' pass to give them an away goal. United equalised in injury-time through Giggs, who converted a Beckham cross; a Teddy Sheringham goal a few minutes earlier had been disallowed. The draw meant that United needed to score at least one goal in Italy to qualify for the final. In the second leg at the Stadio delle Alpi, Filippo Inzaghi scored twice in the first 11 minutes to give Juve a 3–1 aggregate lead. United captain Roy Keane, who was shown a yellow card, preventing him from playing the final, headed in a Beckham cross. Dwight Yorke added a second to level the match just before the break. In the second half, Juventus had a goal by Inzaghi ruled out because of offside. Scholes received a yellow card and missed the final. Five minutes before full time, Cole put United ahead for the first time in the match and the tie: Yorke was brought down by the Juve keeper Angelo Peruzzi in the area as he went round him, but the referee played the advantage, and Cole scored from an acute angle. United held to win 3–2 in the second leg and 4–3 on aggregate, qualifying for a spot in the final.

==== Final ====
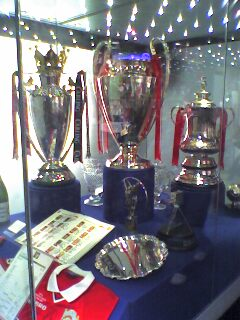
The Treble trophies: the Premier League, Champions League, and FA Cup (left to right)

Manchester United were without first-choice central midfielders Keane and Scholes, as both were suspended after receiving a second yellow card in the competition. Ferguson reorganised the team, with Blomqvist and Butt replacing Keane and Scholes, Beckham moving from right-wing to centre-midfield, and Giggs moving from the left to the right wing; United lined up in their normal 4–4–2 formation. This was the final match for Peter Schmeichel, who captained the team. Their opponent, Bayern Munich, was also contesting for the Treble, having won the Bundesliga earlier and reached the final of Germany's primary cup competition, the DFB-Pokal.

Mario Basler's free kick after six minutes went to the bottom corner of the net, opening the scoring for Bayern Munich. Bayern then had the chance to extend their lead with Mehmet Scholl hitting the post and Carsten Jancker the crossbar, forcing Peter Schmeichel to make numerous saves. In reaction to going a goal down, Ferguson substituted in Sheringham for Blomqvist and Solskjær for Cole. As the game went to injury time, referee Pierluigi Collina indicated that three minutes would be played. In almost the last attack of the game, United won a corner, which Beckham took, and goalkeeper Schmeichel went up front for. The ball was partially cleared by the Bayern defence before being played back to Giggs, who sent a low volley into the path of Sheringham, whose scuffed shot squeezed low inside the post. Almost immediately after the equaliser, United won another corner, taken by Beckham again. He landed the ball on the head of Sheringham, who nodded it to Solskjær; Solskjær rifled it into the top corner of the goal. Oliver Kahn, the Bayern goalkeeper, was motionless on the line. Bayern barely had time to restart the game, which referee Collina brought to a close just a few seconds later.

I can't believe it. I can't believe it. Football, bloody hell.

— Alex Ferguson, speaking moments after winning the Champions League

Schmeichel and Ferguson were presented with the trophy by UEFA president Lennart Johansson. Despite their suspensions, both Keane and Scholes received winners' medals on the rostrum. Keane claims that as of 2006 he has not looked at the medal, feeling that his absence had tainted the accomplishment to the extent that he "didn't deserve the medal". Substituted Bayern legend Lothar Matthäus removed his runner-up medal as soon as he received it, and later remarked that United were "lucky" to win the final.

Manchester United became the first English team to win the Champions League since it was rebranded in 1992, and the first to win the European Cup overall since Liverpool beat Roma in 1984. Coincidentally, the final was played on what would have been Sir Matt Busby's 90th birthday; he had died five years earlier. Bayern went on to lose the DFB-Pokal final on penalties to Werder Bremen.

Date	Round	Opponents	H / A	Result F–A	Scorers	Attendance
3 March 1999	Quarter-final; First leg	Internazionale	H	2–0	Yorke (2) 6', 45'	54,430
17 March 1999	Quarter-final; Second leg	Internazionale	A	1–1	Scholes 88'	79,528
7 April 1999	Semi-final; First leg	Juventus	H	1–1	Giggs 90+2'	54,487
21 April 1999	Semi-final; Second leg	Juventus	A	3–2	Keane 24', Yorke 34', Cole 84'	60,806
26 May 1999	Final	Bayern Munich	N	2–1	Sheringham 90+1', Solskjær 90+3'	91,000

Colours: Green = Manchester United win; Yellow = draw; Red = opponents win.

== Aftermath and legacy ==
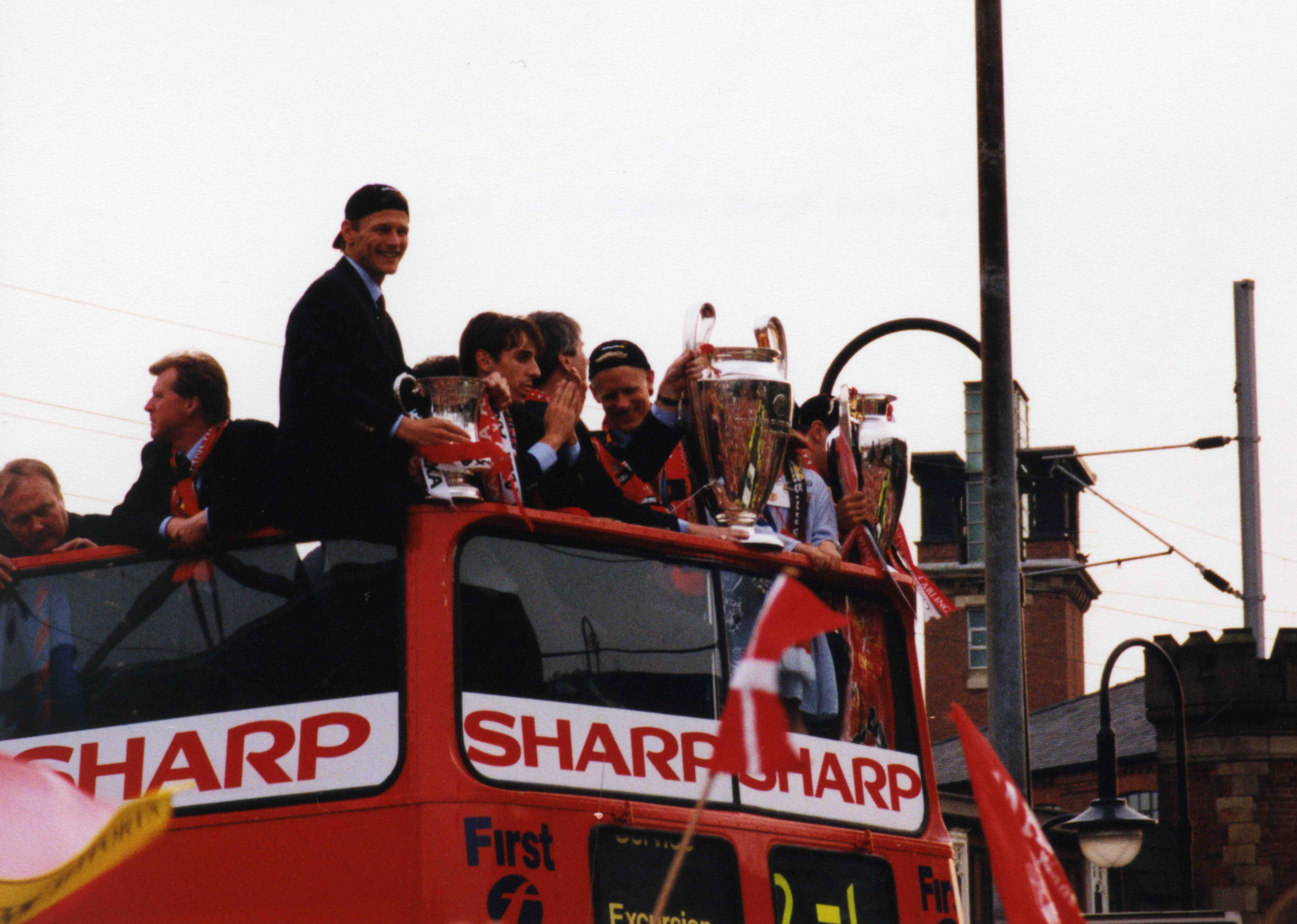
Manchester United celebrating their Treble win in Deansgate in May 1999.

Less than 24 hours after winning the Champions League in Barcelona, a crowd of 500,000 people turned up on the streets of Manchester to greet the United players, who paraded through the city with their trophies in an open-top bus. David Beckham was named as the winner of the UEFA Club Footballer of the Year, as well as UEFA's Best Midfielder award. Beckham was also voted as the runner-up for the 1999 Ballon d'Or and the 1999 FIFA World Player of the Year awards.

Along with the Busby Babes, the 1999 Treble-winning team is regarded by supporters as the benchmark of Manchester United teams. In 2007, The Daily Telegraph, in association with World Soccer Magazine, published a list of the 20 greatest football teams of all time: United were ranked in last position, behind Liverpool's double winners of 1977. The extra-time winner scored by Ryan Giggs in the FA Cup semi-final replay against Arsenal topped a poll for the best goal in the competition, and Channel 4 viewers rated the team's comeback in the Champions League final at number four on the list of 100 Greatest Sporting Moments. Winning the Treble is considered the greatest achievement in the career of manager Alex Ferguson, although he has disagreed with that assessment. In recognition of the team's success, Ferguson was made a Knight Bachelor and also received the Freedom of his home city of Glasgow.

As champions of Europe, Manchester United played against the 1998–99 UEFA Cup Winners' Cup winners Lazio in the 1999 UEFA Super Cup, but lost the match 1–0. Manchester United were also invited to play in the Intercontinental Cup against the winners of the 1999 Copa Libertadores, Brazilian side Palmeiras, in Tokyo. Roy Keane scored the winner, making the team the first and last British side to win the trophy before it was abolished in 2004. Having been led to believe it would help The Football Association with their bid to host the 2006 FIFA World Cup, United controversially withdrew from the 1999–2000 FA Cup, the first time the holders had done so, in order to play in the inaugural Club World Championship. They did not progress past the group stage, and Ferguson later regretted how they handled the situation. United won the 1999–2000 Premier League with 91 points, ahead of runners-up Arsenal by 18 points, but were beaten by Real Madrid in the quarter-finals of the 1999–2000 Champions League.

On 26 May 2019, Manchester United and Bayern Munich legends sides played each other in a charity match at Old Trafford to commemorate the 20th anniversary of United completing the Treble. Manchester United won the match 5–0, with goals from Solskjær, Yorke, Butt and Beckham, as well as Louis Saha, who played for the club from 2004 to 2008.

== Squad statistics ==
Manchester United used 29 players in the season, of which 23 players were used in the league.

Key

Pos = Playing position

Apps = Appearances

GK = Goalkeeper

DF = Defender

MF = Midfielder

FW = Forward

Numbers in parentheses denote appearances as substitute.

No.	Pos.	Name	League		FA Cup		League Cup		Champions League		Charity Shield		Total	
No.	Pos.	Name	Apps	Goals	Apps	Goals	Apps	Goals	Apps	Goals	Apps	Goals	Apps	Goals
1	GK	(Denmark) Peter Schmeichel	34	0	8	0	0	0	13	0	1	0	56	0
2	DF	(England) Gary Neville	34	1	7	0	0	0	12	0	1	0	54	1
3	DF	(Republic of Ireland) Denis Irwin	26(3)	2	6	1	0	0	12	0	1	0	45(3)	3
4	DF	(England) David May	4(2)	0	1	0	2	0	0	0	0	0	7(2)	0
5	DF	(Norway) Ronny Johnsen	19(3)	3	3(2)	0	1	0	6(2)	0	1	0	30(7)	3
6	DF	(Netherlands) Jaap Stam	30	1	6(1)	0	0	0	13	0	1	0	50(1)	1
7	MF	(England) David Beckham	33(1)	6	7	1	0(1)	0	12	2	1	0	53(2)	9
8	MF	(England) Nicky Butt	22(9)	2	5	0	2	0	4(4)	0	1	0	34(13)	2
9	FW	(England) Andy Cole	26(6)	17	6(1)	2	0	0	10	5	1	0	43(7)	24
10	FW	(England) Teddy Sheringham	7(10)	2	1(3)	1	1	1	2(2)	1	0(1)	0	11(16)	5
11	MF	(Wales) Ryan Giggs	20(4)	3	5(1)	2	1	0	9	5	1	0	36(5)	10
12	DF	(England) Phil Neville	19(9)	0	4(3)	0	2	0	4(2)	1	0(1)	0	29(15)	1
13	DF	(England) John Curtis	1(3)	0	0	0	3	0	0	0	0	0	4(3)	0
14	MF	(Netherlands) Jordi Cruyff	0(5)	2	0	0	2	0	0(3)	0	0(1)	0	2(9)	2
15	MF	(Sweden) Jesper Blomqvist	20(5)	1	3(2)	0	0(1)	0	6(1)	0	0	0	29(9)	1
16	MF	(Republic of Ireland) Roy Keane (c)	33(2)	2	7	0	0	0	12	3	1	0	53(2)	5
17	GK	(Netherlands) Raimond van der Gouw	4(1)	0	0	0	3	0	0	0	0	0	7(1)	0
18	MF	(England) Paul Scholes	24(7)	6	3(3)	1	0(1)	0	10(2)	4	1	0	38(13)	11
19	FW	(Trinidad and Tobago) Dwight Yorke	32	18	5(3)	3	0	0	11	8	0	0	48(3)	29
20	FW	(Norway) Ole Gunnar Solskjær	9(10)	12	4(4)	1	3	3	1(5)	2	0(1)	0	17(20)	18
21	DF	(Norway) Henning Berg	10(6)	0	5	0	3	0	3(1)	0	0(1)	0	21(8)	0
22	FW	(Norway) Erik Nevland	0	0	0	0	0(1)	1	0	0	0	0	0(1)	1
23	DF	(England) Michael Clegg	0	0	0	0	3	0	0	0	0	0	3	0
24	DF	(England) Wes Brown	11(3)	0	2	0	0(1)	0	3(1)	0	0	0	16(5)	0
26	DF	(England) Chris Casper	0	0	0	0	0	0	0	0	0	0	0	0
28	MF	(Northern Ireland) Philip Mulryne	0	0	0	0	2	0	0	0	0	0	2	0
29	FW	(Scotland) Alex Notman	0	0	0	0	0(1)	0	0	0	0	0	0(1)	0
30	DF	(England) Ronnie Wallwork	0	0	0	0	0(1)	0	0	0	0	0	0(1)	0
31	GK	(England) Nick Culkin	0	0	0	0	0	0	0	0	0	0	0	0
33	MF	(England) Mark Wilson	0	0	0	0	2	0	0(1)	0	0	0	2(1)	0
34	MF	(England) Jonathan Greening	0(3)	0	0(1)	0	3	0	0	0	0	0	3(4)	0
38	DF	(England) Danny Higginbotham	0	0	0	0	0	0	0	0	0	0	0	0
Own goal			—N/a	2	—N/a	0	—N/a	0	—N/a	0	—N/a	0	—N/a	2

Source: (Note: Source for appearances and goals in the Premier League, FA Cup, League Cup, and Champions League:. Source for appearances and goals in the Charity Shield:.)

== Transfers ==
Manchester United's first departure of the 1998–99 season was Ben Thornley, who joined Huddersfield Town for £175,000 on 3 July 1998. A day later, Leon Mills signed for Wigan Athletic for an undisclosed fee, and Adam Sadler was released. Two of the club's longest-serving players, Brian McClair and Gary Pallister, also left. McClair had been at United since 1987 and opted for a return to Motherwell in the Scottish Premier League; he had played at Fir Park in the early 1980s. Pallister agreed to return to Middlesbrough in a £2.5 million deal, nine years after he had left them for a £2.3 million transfer to Old Trafford. On 4 November 1998, Chris Casper signed for Reading for a fee of £300,000.

Addressing the loss of Pallister, Ferguson signed Jaap Stam from PSV Eindhoven, becoming the world's most expensive defender in a £10 million deal. Swedish winger Jesper Blomqvist soon followed, completing a £4.4 million transfer in July before Dwight Yorke was controversially drafted in from Aston Villa to become the club's record signing. Dutch striker Patrick Kluivert, who impressed during the World Cup, was on the verge of finalising a £9 million move from Milan, only for talks to fall through. A £5.5 million offer for Ole Gunnar Solskjær from Tottenham Hotspur was accepted, but Solskjær himself turned down the transfer after a meeting with Alex Ferguson.

On 24 March, Michael Ryan signed for Wrexham for an undisclosed fee. A day later, Paul Gibson signed for Notts County, and on the same day, Philip Mulryne signed for Norwich City. On 16 April, Terry Cooke signed for United's cross-town rivals, Manchester City. On 30 June, United released Gerard Gaff and Jason Hickson, the same day that Peter Schmeichel signed for Sporting CP, John Thorrington joined Bayer Leverkusen, and Lee Whiteley departed for Salford City.

United's only winter arrival was Bojan Djordjic, who signed for an undisclosed fee on 17 February.

=== In ===
Date	Pos.	Name	From	Fee
1 July 1998	DF	(Netherlands) Jaap Stam	(Netherlands) PSV Eindhoven	£10.75m
8 July 1998	DF	(England) Russell Best	(England) Notts County	Free
21 July 1998	MF	(Sweden) Jesper Blomqvist	(Italy) Parma	£4.4m
3 August 1998	DF	(Republic of Ireland) John O'Shea	(Republic of Ireland) Waterford Bohemians	Undisclosed
20 August 1998	FW	(Trinidad and Tobago) Dwight Yorke	(England) Aston Villa	£12.6m
17 February 1999	MF	(Sweden) Bojan Djordjic	(Sweden) Brommapojkarna	Undisclosed
2 June 1999	GK	(Australia) Mark Bosnich	(England) Aston Villa	Free

=== Out ===
Date	Pos.	Name	To	Fee
3 July 1998	MF	(England) Ben Thornley	(England) Huddersfield Town	£175k
4 July 1998	MF	(England) Leon Mills	(England) Wigan Athletic	Undisclosed
4 July 1998	GK	(England) Adam Sadler	Released	
9 July 1998	DF	(England) Gary Pallister	(England) Middlesbrough	£2.5m
8 October 1998	DF	(England) Russell Best	Released	
4 November 1998	DF	(England) Chris Casper	(England) Reading	£300k
24 March 1999	FW	(England) Michael Ryan	(Wales) Wrexham	Undisclosed
25 March 1999	GK	(England) Paul Gibson	(England) Notts County	Undisclosed
25 March 1999	MF	(Northern Ireland) Philip Mulryne	(England) Norwich City	£500k
16 April 1999	MF	(England) Terry Cooke	(England) Manchester City	£1m
30 June 1999	DF	(England) Gerard Gaff	Released	
30 June 1999	FW	(England) Jason Hickson	Released	
30 June 1999	GK	(Denmark) Peter Schmeichel	(Portugal) Sporting CP	Free
30 June 1999	MF	(United States) John Thorrington	(Germany) Bayer Leverkusen	Undisclosed
30 June 1999	MF	(England) Lee Whiteley	(England) Salford City	Undisclosed

=== Loan out ===
Date from	Date to	Position	Name	To
1 August 1998	10 March 1999	FW	(England) Michael Twiss	(England) Sheffield United
17 September 1998	1 November 1998	DF	(England) Chris Casper	(England) Reading
30 October 1998	9 January 1999	MF	(England) Terry Cooke	(Wales) Wrexham
1 November 1998	30 June 1999	DF	(England) Danny Higginbotham	(Belgium) Royal Antwerp
7 November 1998	7 December 1998	GK	(England) Paul Gibson	(England) Hull City
14 January 1999	14 April 1999	MF	(England) Terry Cooke	(England) Manchester City
14 January 1999	31 May 1999	FW	(Norway) Erik Nevland	(Sweden) IFK Göteborg
15 January 1999	31 May 1999	MF	(Netherlands) Jordi Cruyff	(Spain) Celta Vigo
27 January 1999	5 May 1999	DF	(England) Ronnie Wallwork	(Belgium) Royal Antwerp
27 January 1999	5 May 1999	FW	(England) Jamie Wood	(Belgium) Royal Antwerp
10 February 1999	1 May 1999	FW	(Scotland) Alex Notman	(Scotland) Aberdeen

== Attempted takeover by BSkyB ==
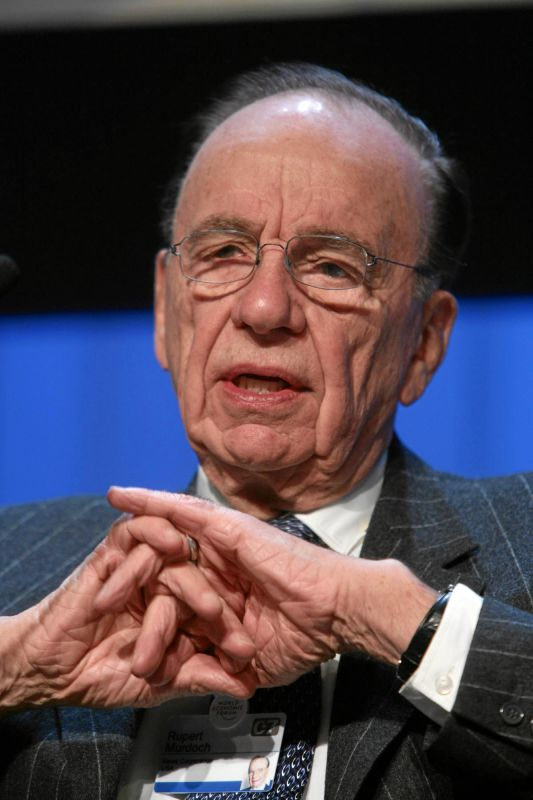
After a meeting with Silvio Berlusconi in spring 1998, Rupert Murdoch (pictured) informed BSkyB of the need to buy a football club if the company wanted to hold on to their Premier League rights.

In September 1998, Manchester United were the target of a proposed takeover by BSkyB, a subsidiary of Rupert Murdoch's News Corporation. Negotiations between both sides had begun during the summer, but had stalled after disagreements over the asking price. The satellite group's original bid of £575 million – initially thought to be their final offer – was deemed too low by two members of United's board (chairman Martin Edwards and Professor Sir Roland Smith), who pressed for a higher figure. On 9 September, Manchester United accepted a bid of £623.4 million; Figures announced during the season named Manchester United as the richest in world football, with a turnover of £88 million for 1996–97, 50% more than Barcelona in second place at £59 million. Bowing down to public pressure, trade secretary Peter Mandelson referred the deal to the Monopolies and Mergers Commission in October 1998. The report, finalised in April 1999, found that BSkyB acted selfishly and blocked the broadcaster's bid.

A year earlier, Murdoch's Fox Entertainment Group, which held broadcasting rights to the regular season of Major League Baseball, purchased the Los Angeles Dodgers for US$311 million. He was now able to control both programming content on his network and distribution rights to the Dodgers. For the same reason, BSkyB replicated Fox's strategy and went ahead with a takeover of a Premier League club. Manchester United was thus the unanimous choice of Murdoch and board members. The club was the most valuable in English football, making £30.1 million from gate receipts and programmes in 1997 alone. At the same time, more than 200 supporters' groups were established worldwide, and the club's fanbase exceeded 100 million, despite only a million having been to Old Trafford to watch the first team play. As a means of capitalising on this growing market, MUTV, a television station operated by the club, was launched in August 1998. In co-operation with Granada Media Group and BSkyB, it was the world's first channel dedicated to a football club, funded entirely through subscriptions. On the pitch, United's success was mostly due to the talents of manager Ferguson, who assembled a team capable of dominating in the long-term.

=== Reaction from supporters ===
When BSkyB publicised their intentions to take over Manchester United, supporters reacted angrily to the news. Many felt the club's traditions, built on a loyal fanbase and the attractive football played under Matt Busby and now Alex Ferguson, would be tarnished. United was no longer an independent entity, and major decisions affecting the club looked increasingly likely to be taken outside of the United Kingdom. As a means of rallying supporters to get behind their cause, awareness campaigns against the takeover were launched. Red Issue issued pamphlets to fans. Demonstrations in and around Old Trafford took place before the match against Charlton Athletic on 9 September. Football fans across the UK also lent support by lobbying their local Member of Parliament to passing legislation, preventing further sport takeovers in the future.

Murdoch's bid led to the formation of Shareholders United Against Murdoch, more commonly known as Manchester United Supporters' Trust today. Working alongside Independent Manchester United Supporters Association (IMUSA), they sought the merger to be referred by the Secretary of State for Trade and Industry to the Monopolies and Mergers Commission. Both groups therefore submitted papers to the Office of Fair Trading, arguing that the merger should not be carried out. IMUSA argued that BSkyB's main intention was to strengthen their already dominant position and not that of United. Sky Television's relevant market was premium subscription channels, and buying an established Premier League team when they already had rights to the division was purely for financial gain. Moreover, Manchester United's market was on the pitch, and an acquisition by a media organisation – particularly one run by Murdoch – may damage the sport in the long-term.
