= Arsenal 1–2 Manchester United (1999) =

1999 FA Cup semi-final replay

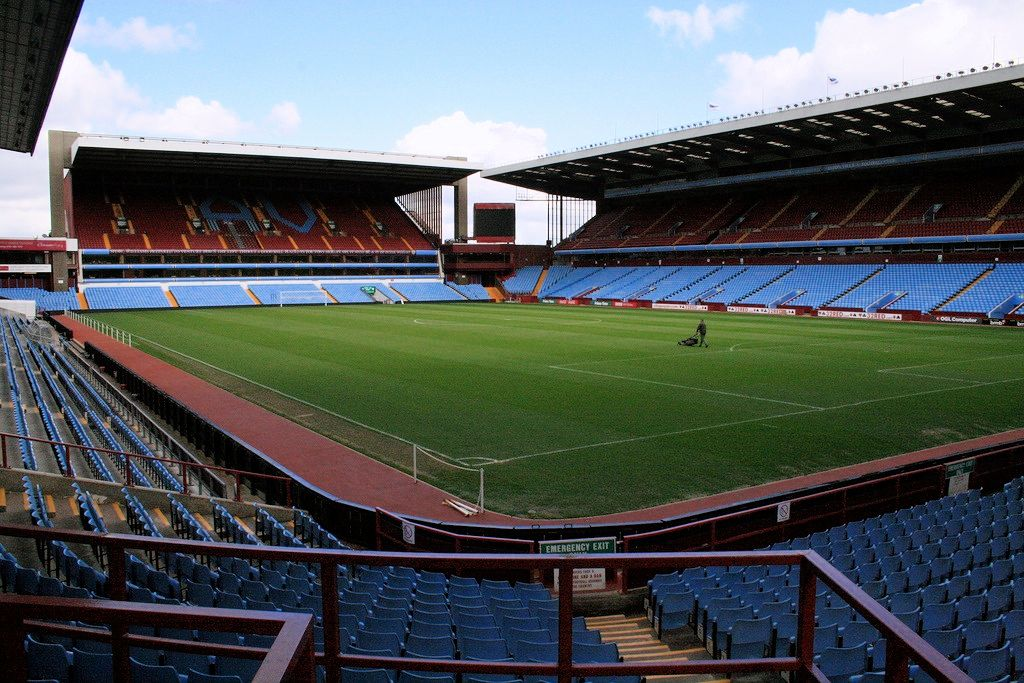
- Villa Park in 2008
- Event: 1998–99 FA Cup semi-final replay
Arsenal	Manchester United
1	2
- After extra time
- Date: 14 April 1999
- Venue: Villa Park, Birmingham
- Referee: David Elleray (Harrow)
- Attendance: 30,223

The replay of the 1998–99 FA Cup semi-final between Arsenal and Manchester United was a football match that took place at Villa Park in Birmingham, England, on 14 April 1999.

The game is often described as one of Manchester United's greatest ever, and Giggs' winning goal is frequently cited as one of the greatest goals ever scored in English football. Rob Smyth of The Guardian described it as "the greatest game in the modern era of English football. […] this match […] had such gravitas, subtlety, intensity and excellence that it should have been shown on HBO."

== Background ==
Manchester United and Arsenal were rivals at the top of English football; Arsenal won the 1997–98 FA Premier League with United finishing second. They achieved the Double by also winning the 1997–98 FA Cup. As a result, United took the vacated 1998 FA Charity Shield berth through their league position, which Arsenal won 3–0 at the start of the season. The two teams were also vying for the 1998–99 FA Premier League title where in the fixtures, Arsenal won 3–0 again at Highbury in September and both sides drew 1–1 at Old Trafford in February.

=== Initial semi-final tie ===
The original semi-final fixture took place three days prior, on 11 April also at Villa Park, which ended in a 0–0 draw after extra time and so necessitated a replay. During the first half, Roy Keane had a goal controversially disallowed for an offside decision against assist provider Ryan Giggs. Arsenal defender Nelson Vivas got sent off for a second bookable offence in extra time.

== Route to the semi-final ==
Arsenal			Round	Manchester United		
Opponent	Result	Replay	Round	Opponent	Result	Replay
Preston North End	4–2 (A)	—N/a	Third round	Middlesbrough	3–1 (H)	—N/a
Wolverhampton Wanderers	2–1 (A)	—N/a	Fourth round	Liverpool	2–1 (H)	—N/a
Sheffield United	2–1 (H) (Note: Both sides felt that Arsenal's winning goal had been gained unfairly. Marc Overmars scored following Nwankwo Kanu's failure to return the ball to Sheffield United following an injury. Arsenal manager Arsène Wenger offered to replay the tie.)	2–1 (H)	Fifth round	Fulham	1–0 (H)	—N/a
Derby County	1–0 (H)	—N/a	Sixth round	Chelsea	0–0 (H)	2–0 (A)
Manchester United	0–0 a.e.t. (N)	—N/a	Semi-final	Arsenal	0–0 a.e.t. (N)	—N/a

== Match ==
=== Summary ===
David Beckham scored an early goal for Manchester United, with Dennis Bergkamp equalising in the second half. Roy Keane, United's captain, received a second yellow card and was sent off for a bad tackle on Marc Overmars. After Phil Neville fouled Ray Parlour in the box in injury time, Arsenal were awarded a penalty. Bergkamp's shot was saved by Peter Schmeichel, taking the game to extra time. During the second half of extra time, Patrick Vieira misplaced a pass which was intercepted by Ryan Giggs in his team's half of the pitch, who went on to score a sensational solo goal by dribbling past five Arsenal players to give United a 2–1 lead and send them through to the 1999 FA Cup final.

=== Details ===
14 April 1999
19:45

Arsenal	1–2 (a.e.t.)	Manchester United
Bergkamp 69'	Report	Beckham 17'; Giggs 109'

Villa Park, Birmingham
Attendance: 30,223
Referee: David Elleray (Harrow)

Arsenal	Manchester United

GK	1	(England) David Seaman
RB	2	(England) Lee Dixon
CB	6	(England) Tony Adams (c)
CB	14	(England) Martin Keown	(yellow card) 29'
LB	3	(England) Nigel Winterburn
RM	15	(England) Ray Parlour	(yellow card) 61'	(substituted off) 105'
CM	4	(France) Patrick Vieira
CM	26	(France) Emmanuel Petit		(substituted off) 120'
LM	8	(Sweden) Fredrik Ljungberg		(substituted off) 62'
CF	10	(Netherlands) Dennis Bergkamp
CF	9	(France) Nicolas Anelka
Substitutes:
GK	24	(England) John Lukic
DF	5	(England) Steve Bould		(substituted on) 120'
DF	7	(Argentina) Nelson Vivas
MF	11	(Netherlands) Marc Overmars		(substituted on) 62'
FW	25	(Nigeria) Nwankwo Kanu		(substituted on) 105'
Manager:
(France) Arsène Wenger

GK	1	(Denmark) Peter Schmeichel
RB	2	(England) Gary Neville
CB	5	(Norway) Ronny Johnsen
CB	6	(Netherlands) Jaap Stam	(yellow card) 31'
LB	12	(England) Phil Neville
RM	7	(England) David Beckham	(yellow card) 35'
CM	8	(England) Nicky Butt
CM	16	(Republic of Ireland) Roy Keane (c)	(yellow card) 33' (yellow-red card) 74'
LM	15	(Sweden) Jesper Blomqvist		(substituted off) 61'
CF	10	(England) Teddy Sheringham		(substituted off) 75'
CF	20	(Norway) Ole Gunnar Solskjær		(substituted off) 91'
Substitutes:
GK	17	(Netherlands) Raimond van der Gouw
DF	3	(Republic of Ireland) Denis Irwin
MF	11	(Wales) Ryan Giggs		(substituted on) 61'
MF	18	(England) Paul Scholes		(substituted on) 75'
FW	19	(Trinidad and Tobago) Dwight Yorke		(substituted on) 91'
Manager:
(Scotland) Alex Ferguson

=== Statistics ===
Overall
Statistic	Arsenal	Manchester United
Goals scored	1	2
xG	2.51	1.62
Total shots	27	16
Shots on target	9	4
Ball possession	56%	44%
Pass completion	73%	72%
Passes (completed)	726 (532)	579 (417)
Pressures	167	195
Pressure Regains	50	47
Tackles won (Attempted)	31 (43)	30 (48)
Yellow cards	2	3
Red cards / Second yellows	0 / 0	0 / 1

== Aftermath ==
Martin Tyler: A rather weary one from Vieira. Giggs gets past Vieira, past Dixon who comes back at him... it's a wonderful run from Giggs! Sensational goal from Ryan Giggs in the second period of extra time. He's cut Arsenal to ribbons and the team with 10 men go back in front 2–1!

— Commentary of Giggs’ winning goal by Martin Tyler

The match was the last ever FA Cup semi-final to go to a replay. In the FA Cup final, Manchester United beat Newcastle United 2–0 to win the Cup, securing the Double, as they had won the Premier League a week earlier by pipping Arsenal to the title on the final day by one point. Four days later, they completed the Treble by beating Bayern Munich in the UEFA Champions League final.

The game is remembered as one of the greatest in English football; it was ranked #38 in The Times' 50 Greatest Football Matches (2019).

Giggs' winning goal is also considered among the greatest ever scored, and his celebration, removing his shirt to reveal copious chest hair, is considered an iconic image by football fans. Ian Wright described it as "arguably one of the best goals in FA Cup history." It has been compared to Diego Maradona's solo goal for Argentina against England in the 1986 World Cup quarter-final.

Both Ray Parlour and Arsène Wenger admitted to being "haunted" by the defeat and Giggs' goal.

A statistical analysis of the game in The Independent in 2019 gave Arsenal 2.51 expected goals (xG) to United's 1.62; Dennis Bergkamp's penalty miss was considered a key moment that won the game for United.
