= 1998–99 FA Cup =

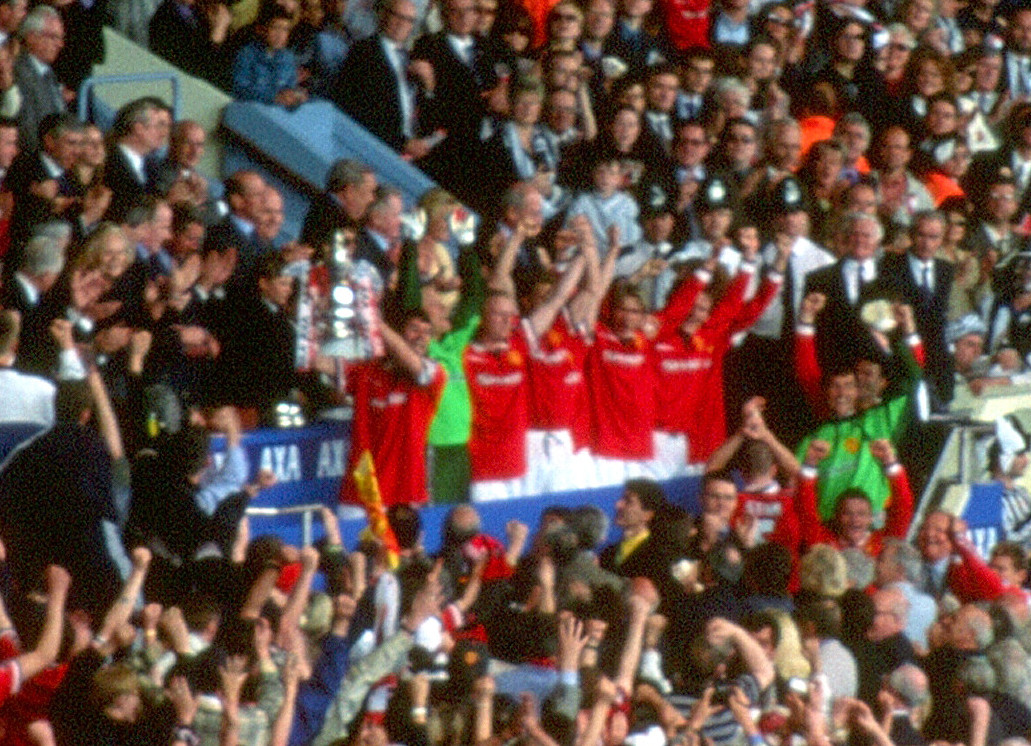
- Manchester United lifting the trophy

Tournament details
- Country: England; Wales
- Teams: 558

Final positions
- Champions: Manchester United (10th title)
- Runners-up: Newcastle United

Tournament statistics
- Top goal scorer(s): Jason Roberts (7 goals)

The 1998–99 FA Cup (known as the AXA-sponsored FA Cup for sponsorship reasons) was the 118th season of the FA Cup. The title defenders were Arsenal, who were eliminated in a semi-final replay by eventual winners Manchester United, who beat Newcastle United 2–0 in the final at the old Wembley Stadium. The goals were scored by Teddy Sheringham after 11 minutes, less than two minutes after coming on as a substitute for Roy Keane, and Paul Scholes on 53 minutes. It was the second leg of a historic treble for Manchester United; having already won the Premier League title the previous weekend, they went on to win the Champions League the following Wednesday.

== Calendar ==
Round	Initial matches	New entries	Clubs
Preliminary round	5 September 1998	172	558 → 472
First round qualifying	19 September 1998	206	472 → 326
Second round qualifying	3 October 1998	66	326 → 220
Third round qualifying	17 October 1998	22	220 → 156
Fourth round qualifying	31 October 1998	none	156 → 124
First round proper	14 November 1998	48	124 → 84
Second round proper	5 December 1998	none	84 → 64
Third round proper	2 January 1999	44	64 → 32
Fourth round proper	23 January 1999	none	32 → 16
Fifth round proper	13 February 1999	none	16 → 8
Sixth round proper	6 March 1999	none	8 → 4
Semi-finals	11 April 1999	none	4 → 2
Final	22 May 1999	none	2 → 1

== Qualifying rounds ==
Following the reformatting of the qualifying rounds for this season, all participating clubs that were not members of the Premier League or Football League entered the competition at various preliminary stages of the tournament to secure one of 32 places available in the first round proper.

The winners from the fourth qualifying round were Runcorn, West Auckland Town, Tamworth, Leigh RMI, Southport, Lancaster City, Telford United, Doncaster Rovers, Burton Albion, Gresley Rovers, Hednesford Town, Emley, Bedlington Terriers, Woking, Kingstonian, Enfield, Hayes, Stevenage Borough, Ford United, Hendon, Slough Town, Worcester City, Basingstoke Town, Camberley Town, Welling United, Boreham Wood, Rushden & Diamonds, Kidderminster Harriers, Yeovil Town, Salisbury City, Dulwich Hamlet and Cheltenham Town.

Bedlington Terriers, Ford United and Camberley Town were appearing in the competition proper for the first time (although Terriers were emulating the achievement of predecessor club Bedlington United in 1926-27). Of the others, Tamworth had not featured in the first round since 1990-91, Worcester City had not done so since 1987-88, Leigh RMI had not done so since 1982-83 (when the club was still based in Horwich), Lancaster City had not done so since 1972-73, West Auckland Town since 1961-62 and Dulwich Hamlet since 1948-49. Additionally, Emley was appearing in the first round for the last time before relocating to Wakefield in 2000.

== First round proper ==
The first round featured the 32 non-league teams from the qualifying rounds and the 48 teams from the third and fourth tiers of the Football League. Ford United and Camberley Town, from the Isthmian League Third Division at Step 9 of English football, were the lowest-ranked teams in the draw.

The matches were played on 14 November 1998. There were ten replays, with three ties requiring a penalty shoot-out to settle.

Tie no	Home team	Score	Away team	Date
1	Enfield (6)	2–2	York City (3)	14 November 1998
Replay	York City (3)	2–1	Enfield (6)	24 November 1998
2	Darlington (4)	3–2	Burnley (3)	17 November 1998
3	Bedlington Terriers (8)	4–1	Colchester United (3)	14 November 1998
4	Preston North End (3)	3–0	Ford United (9)	14 November 1998
5	Yeovil Town (5)	2–2	West Auckland Town (8)	14 November 1998
Replay	West Auckland Town (8)	1–1	Yeovil Town (5)	24 November 1998
Yeovil Town won 5–3 on penalties
6	Reading (3)	0–1	Stoke City (3)	14 November 1998
7	Walsall (3)	1–0	Gresley Rovers (6)	14 November 1998
8	Woking (5)	0–1	Scunthorpe United (4)	14 November 1998
9	Boreham Wood (6)	2–3	Luton Town (3)	15 November 1998
10	Macclesfield Town (3)	2–2	Slough Town (6)	14 November 1998
Replay	Slough Town (6)	1–1	Macclesfield Town (3)	24 November 1998
Macclesfield Town won 9–8 on penalties
11	Scarborough (4)	1–1	Rochdale (4)	14 November 1998
Replay	Rochdale (4)	2–0	Scarborough (4)	24 November 1998
12	Wrexham (3)	1–0	Peterborough United (4)	14 November 1998
13	Hednesford Town (5)	3–1	Barnet (4)	14 November 1998
14	Wycombe Wanderers (3)	1–0	Chesterfield (3)	14 November 1998
15	Manchester City (3)	3–0	Halifax Town (4)	13 November 1998
16	Fulham (3)	1–1	Leigh RMI (6)	15 November 1998
Replay	Leigh RMI (6)	0–2	Fulham (3)	24 November 1998
17	Brentford (4)	5–0	Camberley Town (9)	14 November 1998
18	Bristol Rovers (3)	3–0	Welling United (5)	14 November 1998
19	Northampton Town (3)	2–1	Lancaster City (6)	14 November 1998
20	Plymouth Argyle (4)	0–0	Kidderminster Harriers (5)	14 November 1998
Replay	Kidderminster Harriers (5)	0–0	Plymouth Argyle (4)	1 December 1998
Plymouth Argyle won 5–4 on penalties
21	Oldham Athletic (3)	2–0	Gillingham (3)	14 November 1998
22	Worcester City (6)	0–1	Torquay United (4)	14 November 1998
23	Southend United (4)	0–1	Doncaster Rovers (5)	14 November 1998
24	Mansfield Town (4)	2–1	Hayes (5)	14 November 1998
25	Cardiff City (4)	6–0	Chester City (4)	14 November 1998
26	Cheltenham Town (5)	0–1	Lincoln City (3)	14 November 1998
27	Kingstonian (5)	1–0	Burton Albion (6)	14 November 1998
28	Dulwich Hamlet (6)	0–1	Southport (5)	14 November 1998
29	Runcorn (6)	1–1	Stevenage Borough (5)	14 November 1998
Replay	Stevenage Borough (5)	2–0	Runcorn (6)	23 November 1998
30	Wigan Athletic (3)	4–3	Blackpool (3)	14 November 1998
31	Tamworth (6)	2–2	Exeter City (4)	14 November 1998
Replay	Exeter City (4)	4–1	Tamworth (6)	24 November 1998
32	Leyton Orient (4)	4–2	Brighton & Hove Albion (4)	14 November 1998
33	Hendon (6)	0–0	Notts County (3)	15 November 1998
Replay	Notts County (3)	3–0	Hendon (6)	1 December 1998
34	Basingstoke Town (6)	1–2	AFC Bournemouth (3)	14 November 1998
35	Telford United (5)	0–2	Cambridge United (4)	14 November 1998
36	Swansea City (4)	3–0	Millwall (3)	13 November 1998
37	Emley (6)	1–1	Rotherham United (4)	15 November 1998
Replay	Rotherham United (4)	3–1	Emley (6)	24 November 1998
38	Hartlepool United (4)	2–1	Carlisle United (4)	14 November 1998
39	Rushden & Diamonds (5)	1–0	Shrewsbury Town (4)	14 November 1998
40	Salisbury City (6)	0–2	Hull City (4)	14 November 1998

== Second round proper ==
The second round of the competition featured the winners of the first round ties. The matches were scheduled to be played on 5 December 1998, with eight replays and two penalty shoot-outs required, each of which featured a team who won on penalties in the previous round.

Step 8 side Bedlington Terriers, from the Northern League First Division, was the lowest-ranked team in the draw courtesy of their stunning upset victory over Second Division (Step 3) strugglers Colchester United in the previous round.

Tie no	Home team	Score	Away team	Date
1	Darlington (4)	1–1	Manchester City (3)	4 December 1998
Replay	Manchester City (3)	1–0	Darlington (4)	15 December 1998
2	Preston North End (3)	2–0	Walsall (3)	5 December 1998
3	Rochdale (4)	0–0	Rotherham United (4)	5 December 1998
Replay	Rotherham United (4)	4–0	Rochdale (4)	15 December 1998
4	Yeovil Town (5)	2–0	Northampton Town (3)	5 December 1998
5	Notts County (3)	1–1	Wigan Athletic (3)	5 December 1998
Replay	Wigan Athletic (3)	0–0	Notts County (3)	15 December 1998
Notts County won 4–2 on penalties
6	Macclesfield Town (3)	4–1	Cambridge United (4)	5 December 1998
7	Lincoln City (3)	4–1	Stevenage Borough (5)	5 December 1998
8	Luton Town (3)	1–2	Hull City (4)	5 December 1998
9	Doncaster Rovers (5)	0–0	Rushden & Diamonds (5)	5 December 1998
Replay	Rushden & Diamonds (5)	4–2	Doncaster Rovers (5)	15 December 1998
10	Wrexham (3)	2–1	York City (3)	5 December 1998
11	Wycombe Wanderers (3)	1–1	Plymouth Argyle (4)	5 December 1998
Replay	Plymouth Argyle (4)	3–2	Wycombe Wanderers (3)	15 December 1998
12	Fulham (3)	4–2	Hartlepool United (4)	5 December 1998
13	Oldham Athletic (3)	1–1	Brentford (4)	5 December 1998
Replay	Brentford (4)	2–2	Oldham Athletic (3)	15 December 1998
Oldham Athletic won 4–2 on penalties
14	Exeter City (4)	2–2	Bristol Rovers (3)	5 December 1998
Replay	Bristol Rovers (3)	5–0	Exeter City (4)	15 December 1998
15	Scunthorpe United (4)	2–0	Bedlington Terriers (8)	5 December 1998
16	Mansfield Town (4)	1–2	Southport (5)	5 December 1998
17	Cardiff City (4)	3–1	Hednesford Town (5)	5 December 1998
18	Kingstonian (5)	0–0	Leyton Orient (4)	6 December 1998
Replay	Leyton Orient (4)	2–1	Kingstonian (5)	15 December 1998
19	Torquay United (4)	0–1	AFC Bournemouth (3)	5 December 1998
20	Swansea City (4)	1–0	Stoke City (3)	5 December 1998

== Third round proper ==
The third round of the season's FA Cup was scheduled for 2 January 1999. This round marked the point at which the teams in the two highest divisions in the English league system, the Premier League and the Football League First Division entered the competition. The round featured three teams from the Football Conference at Step 5 who were the last non-league clubs left in the tournament: Yeovil Town, Southport and Rushden & Diamonds.

There were six replays, with none of these games requiring a penalty shoot-out.

Tie no	Home team	Score	Away team	Date
1	AFC Bournemouth (3)	1–0	West Bromwich Albion (2)	2 January 1999
2	Bristol City (2)	0–2	Everton (1)	2 January 1999
3	Bury (2)	0–3	Stockport County (2)	2 January 1999
4	Preston North End (3)	2–4	Arsenal (1)	4 January 1999
5	Southampton (1)	1–1	Fulham (3)	2 January 1999
Replay	Fulham (3)	1–0	Southampton (1)	13 January 1999
6	Leicester City (1)	4–2	Birmingham City (2)	2 January 1999
7	Nottingham Forest (1)	0–1	Portsmouth (2)	2 January 1999
8	Blackburn Rovers (1)	2–0	Charlton Athletic (1)	2 January 1999
9	Aston Villa (1)	3–0	Hull City (4)	2 January 1999
10	Sheffield Wednesday (1)	4–1	Norwich City (2)	3 January 1999
11	Bolton Wanderers (2)	1–2	Wolverhampton Wanderers (2)	2 January 1999
12	Crewe Alexandra (2)	1–3	Oxford United (2)	2 January 1999
13	Lincoln City (3)	0–1	Sunderland (2)	2 January 1999
14	Swindon Town (2)	0–0	Barnsley (2)	2 January 1999
Replay	Barnsley (2)	3–1	Swindon Town (2)	19 January 1999
15	Wrexham (3)	4–3	Scunthorpe United (4)	2 January 1999
16	Sheffield United (2)	1–1	Notts County (3)	2 January 1999
Replay	Notts County (3)	3–4	Sheffield United (2)	23 January 1999
17	Tranmere Rovers (2)	0–1	Ipswich Town (2)	2 January 1999
18	Newcastle United (1)	2–1	Crystal Palace (2)	2 January 1999
19	Tottenham Hotspur (1)	5–2	Watford (2)	2 January 1999
20	Queens Park Rangers (2)	0–1	Huddersfield Town (2)	2 January 1999
21	Coventry City (1)	7–0	Macclesfield Town (3)	2 January 1999
22	West Ham United (1)	1–1	Swansea City (4)	2 January 1999
Replay	Swansea City (4)	1–0	West Ham United (1)	13 January 1999
23	Manchester United (1)	3–1	Middlesbrough (1)	3 January 1999
24	Plymouth Argyle (4)	0–3	Derby County (1)	2 January 1999
25	Bradford City (2)	2–1	Grimsby Town (2)	2 January 1999
26	Oldham Athletic (3)	0–2	Chelsea (1)	2 January 1999
27	Wimbledon (1)	1–0	Manchester City (3)	2 January 1999
28	Cardiff City (4)	1–1	Yeovil Town (5)	2 January 1999
Replay	Yeovil Town (5)	1–2	Cardiff City (4)	12 January 1999
29	Port Vale (2)	0–3	Liverpool (1)	3 January 1999
30	Southport (5)	0–2	Leyton Orient (4)	2 January 1999
31	Rotherham United (4)	0–1	Bristol Rovers (3)	2 January 1999
32	Rushden & Diamonds (5)	0–0	Leeds United (1)	2 January 1999
Replay	Leeds United (1)	3–1	Rushden & Diamonds (5)	13 January 1999

== Fourth round proper ==
The fourth-round ties were played with the thirty-two winners of the previous round. The matches were originally scheduled for 23 January 1999. There were three replays. Third Division sides Cardiff City and Leyton Orient were the lowest-ranked teams in the draw.

Tie no	Home team	Score	Away team	Date
1	Leicester City (1)	0–3	Coventry City (1)	23 January 1999
2	Blackburn Rovers (1)	1–0	Sunderland (2)	23 January 1999
3	Aston Villa (1)	0–2	Fulham (3)	23 January 1999
4	Sheffield Wednesday (1)	2–0	Stockport County (2)	23 January 1999
5	Wolverhampton Wanderers (2)	1–2	Arsenal (1)	24 January 1999
6	Everton (1)	1–0	Ipswich Town (2)	23 January 1999
7	Wrexham (3)	1–1	Huddersfield Town (2)	23 January 1999
Replay	Huddersfield Town (2)	2–1	Wrexham (3)	3 February 1999
8	Sheffield United (2)	4–1	Cardiff City (4)	27 January 1999
9	Newcastle United (1)	3–0	Bradford City (2)	23 January 1999
10	Barnsley (2)	3–1	AFC Bournemouth (3)	23 January 1999
11	Bristol Rovers (3)	3–0	Leyton Orient (4)	23 January 1999
12	Portsmouth (2)	1–5	Leeds United (1)	23 January 1999
13	Manchester United (1)	2–1	Liverpool (1)	24 January 1999
14	Wimbledon (1)	1–1	Tottenham Hotspur (1)	23 January 1999
Replay	Tottenham Hotspur (1)	3–0	Wimbledon (1)	2 February 1999
15	Oxford United (2)	1–1	Chelsea (1)	25 January 1999
Replay	Chelsea (1)	4–2	Oxford United (2)	3 February 1999
16	Swansea City (4)	0–1	Derby County (1)	23 January 1999

== Fifth round proper ==
The fifth-round matches were scheduled for 13 February 1999. There were three replays but, in one game replayed, Arsenal had beaten Sheffield United in the original tie. However, both sides felt that Arsenal's winning goal had been gained unfairly after Marc Overmars scored following Nwankwo Kanu's failure to return the ball to the Blades after an injury. Arsenal's boss Arsene Wenger wrote himself into FA Cup folklore with an act of sportsmanship that saw him offer to play the game again.

Bristol Rovers and Fulham, from the Second Division, were the lowest-ranked teams in the draw and the last teams from the First Round left in the competition.

Tie no	Home team	Score	Away team	Date
1	Sheffield Wednesday (1)	0–1	Chelsea (1)	13 February 1999
2	Everton (1)	2–1	Coventry City (1)	13 February 1999
3	Newcastle United (1)	0–0	Blackburn Rovers (1)	14 February 1999
Replay	Blackburn Rovers (1)	0–1	Newcastle United (1)	24 February 1999
4	Barnsley (2)	4–1	Bristol Rovers (3)	13 February 1999
5	Manchester United (1)	1–0	Fulham (3)	14 February 1999
6	Huddersfield Town (2)	2–2	Derby County (1)	13 February 1999
Replay	Derby County (1)	3–1	Huddersfield Town (2)	24 February 1999
7	Arsenal (1)	2–1	Sheffield United (2)	13 February 1999
Rematch	Arsenal (1)	2–1	Sheffield United (2)	23 February 1999
8	Leeds United (1)	1–1	Tottenham Hotspur (1)	13 February 1999
Replay	Tottenham Hotspur (1)	2–0	Leeds United (1)	24 February 1999

== Sixth round proper ==
The four quarter-final games were scheduled for 6 March 1999, although only the match between Arsenal and Derby County was played on this date. One of the ties, Manchester United–Chelsea, resulted in a draw and went to a replay, which United won.

Barnsley, who lost 1–0 at home to Tottenham Hotspur, was the last team left in the competition from outside the Premier League.

6 March 1999
15:00

Arsenal (1)	1–0	Derby County (1)
Kanu 89'	Details

Arsenal Stadium, Highbury, London
Attendance: 38,046
Referee: Steve Dunn

7 March 1999
16:00

Newcastle United (1)	4–1	Everton (1)
Ketsbaia 21', 73'; Georgiadis 61'; Shearer 81'	Details	Unsworth 57'

St. James' Park, Newcastle
Attendance: 36,504
Referee: Graham Barber

7 March 1999
14:00

Manchester United (1)	0–0	Chelsea (1)
	Details

Old Trafford, Manchester
Attendance: 54,587
Referee: Paul Durkin

Replay

10 March 1999
19:45

Chelsea (1)	0–2	Manchester United (1)
	Details	Yorke 4', 59'

Stamford Bridge, London
Attendance: 33,075
Referee: Paul Durkin

16 March 1999
19:45

Barnsley (2)	0–1	Tottenham Hotspur (1)
	Details	Ginola 68'

Oakwell, Barnsley
Attendance: 18,793
Referee: Mike Reed

== Semi-finals ==
The semi-finals were played on 11 April 1999. The original match between Manchester United and Arsenal finished as a goalless draw, as Roy Keane's goal for Manchester United was controversially ruled out for offside, and the tie went to a replay; it was to be the last replay of a drawn semi-final, with all future ties decided by extra time and penalties.

In the replay, David Beckham opened the scoring for Manchester United in the 17th minute with a strike from 30 yards. Dennis Bergkamp equalised via a deflected shot from the same distance midway through the second half, before Arsenal had a second goal disallowed for offside against Nicolas Anelka. In the immediate aftermath, Keane was sent off for a foul on Overmars that earned him a second yellow card. In the final minutes of normal time, Phil Neville conceded a penalty with a foul on Ray Parlour, only for Manchester United goalkeeper Peter Schmeichel to correctly guess which way Bergkamp would shoot and save the kick. In extra time, Ryan Giggs intercepted a wayward pass from Patrick Vieira just inside the Manchester United half, before dribbling past Vieira, Lee Dixon (twice), Martin Keown and Tony Adams, and beating Arsenal goalkeeper David Seaman with a left-footed strike into the roof of the net. It was hailed almost immediately as one of the greatest goals ever scored in the history of the competition.

The other semi-final between Newcastle and Tottenham was goalless after 90 minutes, but two extra-time goals from Newcastle's Alan Shearer (one from the penalty spot) put the Magpies into their second consecutive FA Cup final and ended Spurs' hopes of adding to the League Cup title they had earned earlier in the season.

11 April 1999
12:30

Manchester United (1)	0–0 (a.e.t.)	Arsenal (1)
	Report

Villa Park, Birmingham
Attendance: 39,217
Referee: David Elleray

Replay

14 April 1999
19:45

Arsenal (1)	1–2 (a.e.t.)	Manchester United (1)
Bergkamp 69'	Report	Beckham 17'; Giggs 109'

Villa Park, Birmingham
Attendance: 30,223
Referee: David Elleray

11 April 1999
15:00

Newcastle United (1)	2–0 (a.e.t.)	Tottenham Hotspur (1)
Shearer 109' (pen.), 118'	Report

Old Trafford, Manchester
Attendance: 53,609
Referee: Paul Durkin

== Final ==
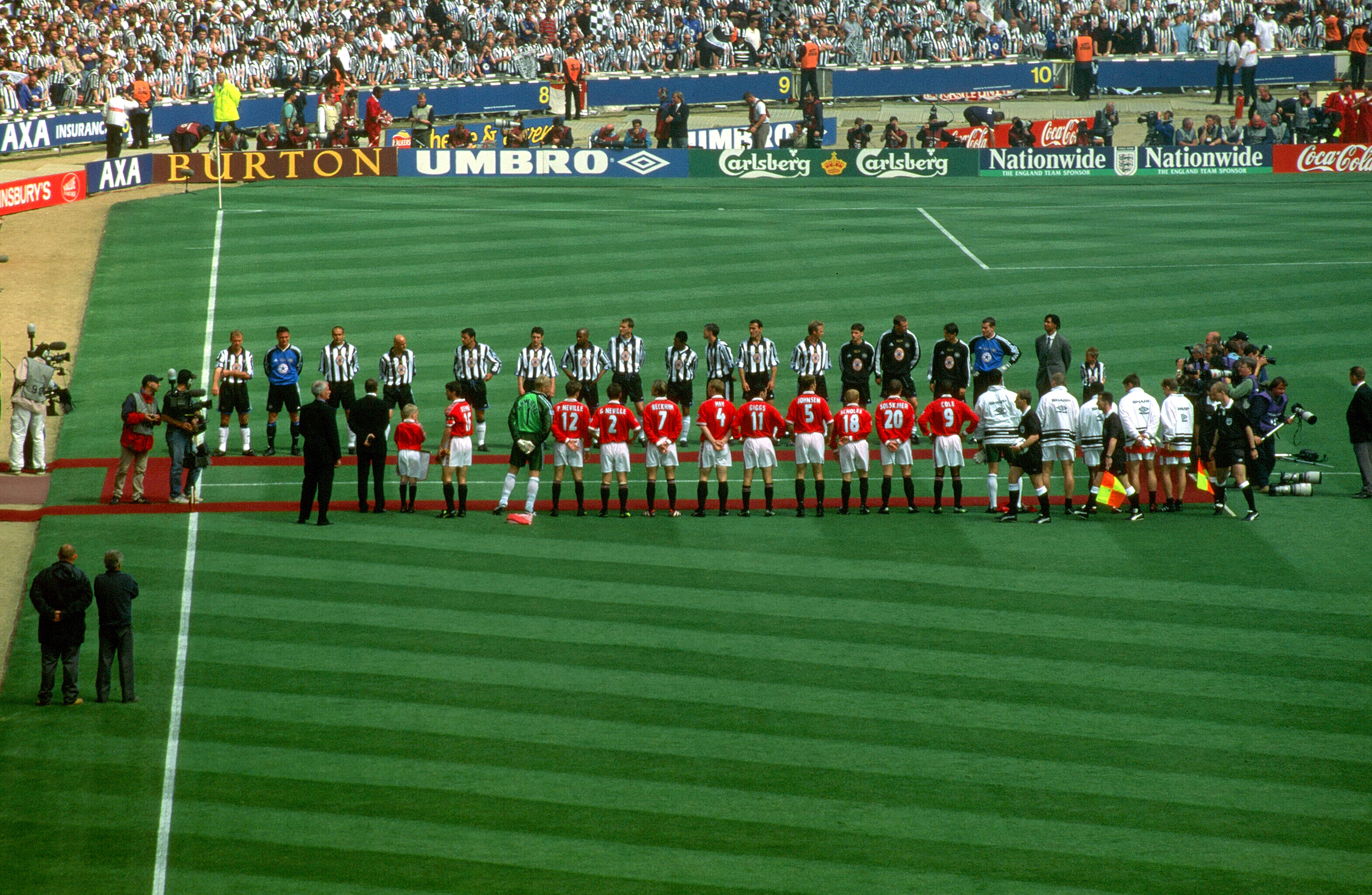
Teams lining up prior to kick-off

The final took place on 22 May 1999 and was played at the old Wembley Stadium, between Manchester United and Newcastle United. Manchester United had finished as champions and Newcastle 13th in the Premier League that season. The final was a slightly one-sided affair, Manchester United claiming a record 10th success with a 2–0 win. Goals from Teddy Sheringham and Paul Scholes were scored in the 11th and 53rd minutes respectively. It was the buildup to Manchester United's Treble. Manchester United also became the first team to win the double three times.

22 May 1999
15:00 BST

Manchester United	2–0	Newcastle United
Sheringham 11'; Scholes 53'	Report

Wembley, London
Attendance: 79,101
Referee: Peter Jones (Leicestershire)

== Media coverage ==
In the United Kingdom, ITV were the free-to-air broadcasters for the second consecutive season, while Sky Sports were the subscription broadcasters for the eleventh consecutive season.

The matches shown live on ITV Sport were:

• Port Vale 0-3 Liverpool (R3)

• Wolverhampton Wanderers 1-2 Arsenal (R4)

• Manchester United 1-0 Fulham (R5)

• Newcastle United 4-1 Everton (QF)

• Newcastle United 2-0 Tottenham Hotspur (SF)

• Manchester United 2-0 Newcastle United (Final)

The matches shown live on Sky Sports were:

• Manchester City 3-0 Halifax Town (R1)

• Boreham Wood 2-3 Luton Town (R1)

• Leigh RMI 0-2 Fulham (R1 Replay)

• Darlington 1-1 Manchester City (R2)

• Kingstonian 0-0 Leyton Orient (R2)

• Brentford 2-2 Oldham Athletic (R2 Replay)

• Manchester United 3-1 Middlesbrough (R3)

• Preston North End 2-4 Arsenal (R3)

• Fulham 1-0 Southampton (R3 Replay)

• Manchester United 2-1 Liverpool (R4)

• Oxford United 1-1 Chelsea (R4)

• Tottenham Hotspur 3-0 Wimbledon (R4 Replay)

• Newcastle United 0-0 Blackburn Rovers (R5)

• Tottenham Hotspur 2-0 Leeds United (R5 Replay)

• Manchester United 0-0 Chelsea (QF)

• Chelsea 0-2 Manchester United (QF Replay)

• Manchester United 0-0 Arsenal (SF)

• Arsenal 1-2 Manchester United (SF Replay)

• Manchester United 2-0 Newcastle United (Final)
