= Notational analysis =

In professional sports, notational analysis is the study of movement patterns, strategy and tactics in team sports. Successful patterns of play can be identified and used in subsequent matches. Notational analysis has a history in dance and music notation. Notational analysis is a way that critical events in a performance can be quantified in a consistent and reliable manner.

In notational analysis, no change in performance of any kind will take place without feedback. The role of feedback is central in the performance improvement process, and by inference, so is the need for accuracy and precision of such feedback. The provision of this accurate and precise feedback can only be facilitated if performance and practice is subjected to a vigorous process of analysis.

== Subjective observation ==
Augmented feedback has traditionally been provided by subjective observations, made during performance by the coaches, in the belief that they can accurately report on the critical elements of performance without any observation aids. Several studies not only contradict this belief, but also suggest that the recall abilities of experienced coaches are little better than those of novices, and that even with observational training, coaches' recall abilities improved only slightly. Furthermore, research in applied psychology has suggested that these recall abilities are also influenced by factors that include the observer's motives and beliefs. The coach is not a passive perceiver of information, and as such his or her perception of events is selective and constructive, not simply a copying process. This importance of feedback to performance improvement, and the limitations of coaches' recall abilities alluded to above, implies a requirement for objective data upon which to base augmented feedback, and the main methods of "objectifying" this data involve the use of video / notational analysis (Hughes and Franks, 1997 p. 11).

== History of data gathering in sports ==
Coaches have been aware, consciously or unconsciously, of these needs for accuracy of feedback and have been using simple data gathering systems for decades. More recently, sports scientists have been using notational analysis systems to answer fundamental questions about game play and performance in sport.

An early work, over some decades, on analysis of soccer was picked up by the then Director of Coaching at the Football Association in the United Kingdom. This had a profound effect on the patterns of play in British football – the adoption of the 'long ball' game. Generally, the first publications in Britain of the research process by notational analysis of sport were in the mid-1970s, so as a discipline it is one of the more recent to be embraced by sports science.

The publication of a number of notation systems in racket sports provided a fund of ideas used by other analysts. Because of the growth and development of sports science as an academic discipline, a number of scientists began using and extending the simple hand notation techniques that had served for decades. This also coincided with the introduction of personal computers, which transformed all aspects of data gathering in sports science. Currently hand and computerized notation systems are both used to equal extents by working analysts, although the use of computer databases to collate hand notated data post-event makes the analyses much more powerful.

The applications of notation have been defined as:

1. tactical evaluation,
2. technical evaluation,
3. analysis of movement,
4. development of a database and modelling, and
5. for educational use with both coaches and players.

Most pieces of research using notation, or indeed any practical applications working directly with coaches and athletes, will span more than one of these purposes.

== The applications of notation ==
=== Tactical evaluation ===
The definition of tactical patterns of play in sports has been a profitable source of work for a number of researchers. The maturation of tactics can be analysed at different levels of development of a specific sport, usually by means of a cross-sectional design. The different tactics used at each level of development within a sport will inevitably depend upon technical development, physical maturation and other variables. The 'maturation models' have very important implications for coaching methods and directions at the different stages of development in each of the racket sports. These tactical 'norms' or 'models', based both upon technique and tactics, demonstrate how the different applications, defined above, can overlap.

Sanderson and Way (1977) used symbols to notate seventeen different strokes, as well as incorporating court plans for recording accurate positional information. The system took an estimated 5–8 hours of use and practise before an operator was sufficiently skillful to record a full match actually during the game. In an average squash match there are about 1000 shots, an analyst using this system will gather over 30 pages of data per match. Not only were the patterns of rally-ending shots (the Nth shot of the rally) examined in detail, but also those shots that preceded the end shot, (N-1) to a winner or error, and the shots that preceded those, (N-2) to a winner or error. In this way the rally ending patterns of play were analysed. Not surprisingly, processing the data for just one match could take as long as 40 hours of further work. The major emphasis of this system was on the gathering of information concerning `play patterns' as well as the comprehensive collection of descriptive match data. Sanderson felt that `suggestive' symbols were better than codes, being easier for the operator to learn and remember. The main disadvantages of this system, as with all longhand systems, was the time taken to learn the system and the large amounts of data generated, which in turn needed so much time to process it.

The 1980s and 1990s saw researchers struggling to harness the developing technology to ease the problems inherent in gathering and interpreting large amounts of complex data. Hughes (1987) modified the method of Sanderson and Way so that the hand-notated data could be processed on a mainframe computer. Eventually, the manual method was modified so that a match could be notated in-match at courtside directly into a microcomputer. This work was then extended to examine the patterns of play of male squash players at recreational, county and elite levels, thus creating empirical models of performance, although the principles of data stabilisation were not thoroughly understood at the time. This form of empirical modelling of tactical profiles is fundamental to a large amount of the published work in notational analysis. By comparing the patterns of play of successful and unsuccessful teams or players in elite competitions, world cup competitions, for example, enables the definition of those performance indicators that differentiate between the two groups. This research template has been used in a number of sports to highlight the tactical parameters that determine success, and it has been extended in tennis to compare the patterns of play that are successful on the different surfaces on which the major tournaments are played.

Most of the examples for tactical applications of notation could appear in the other sections of direct applications of notational analysis, but their initial aims were linked with analysis of tactics. The interesting theme that is emerging, from some of the recent research, is that the tactical models that are defined are changing with time, as players become fitter, stronger, faster, bigger (think of the changes in rugby union since professionalisation in 1996), and the equipment changes – for example, the rackets in all the sports have become lighter and more powerful. Over a period of less than 15 years the length of rallies in squash, for elite players, has decreased from about 20 shots, to about 12 shots per rally. An excellent review (Croucher, 1996) of the application of strategies using notational analysis of different sports outlines the problems, advantages and disadvantages associated with this function.

=== Technical evaluation ===
To define quantitatively where technique fails or excels has very practical uses for coaches, in particular, and also for sports scientists aiming to analyse performance at different levels of development of athletes.

Winners and errors are powerful indicators of technical competence in racket sports and have often been used in research in notational analysis of net-wall games. It has been found that, for all standards of play in squash, if the winner: error ratio for a particular player in a match was greater than one, then that player usually won. (This was achieved with English scoring and a 19-inch tin). Although this ratio is a good index of technique, it would be better used with data for both players, and the ratios should not be simplified nor decimalised. Rally end distributions, winners and errors in the different position cells across the court, have often been used to define technical strengths and weaknesses. This use of these distributions as indicators is valid as long as the overall distribution of shots across the court is evenly balanced. This even distribution of shots rarely occurs in any net or wall game. Dispersions of winners and errors should be normalised with respect to the totals of shots from those cells. It would be more accurate to represent the winner, or error, frequency, from particular position cells, as a ratio to the total number of shots from those cells.

Similarly, performance indicators such as shots are insufficient and need to be expressed with more detail, for example shot to goal ratios (soccer). Even these, powerful as they are, need to be viewed with caution and perhaps integrated with some measure of shooting opportunities? In rugby union, simple numbers of rucks and mauls won by teams may not give a clear impression of the match, the ratio of 'rucks won' to 'rucks initiated' is a more powerful measure of performance. This too could be improved by some measure of how quickly the ball was won in critical areas of the pitch?

Many coaches seek the template of tactical play at the highest level for preparation and training of both elite players and/or teams, and also for those developing players who aspire to reach the highest position. Particular databases, aimed at specific individuals or teams, can also be used to prepare in anticipation of potential opponents for match play. This modelling of technical attainment has been replicated in many sports and form the basis of preparation at the highest levels by the sports science support teams.

== Movement analysis ==
Reilly and Thomas (1976) recorded and analysed the intensity and extent of discrete activities during match play in field soccer. With a combination of hand notation and the use of an audio tape recorder, they analysed in detail the movements of English first division soccer players. They were able to specify work-rates of the different positions, distances covered in a game and the percentage time of each position in each of the different ambulatory classifications. Reilly has continually added to this base of data enabling him to clearly define the specific physiological demands in not just soccer, but all the football codes. This piece of work by Reilly and Thomas has become a standard against which other similar research projects can compare their results and procedures, and it has been replicated by many other researchers in many different sports.

Modern tracking systems have taken the chore out of gathering movement data, which was the most time-consuming application of notational analysis, and advanced computer graphics make the data presentation very simple to understand. Modelling movement has created a better understanding of the respective sports and has enabled specific training programmes to be developed to improve the movement patterns, and fitness, of the respective athletes.

== Development of a database and modelling ==
Teams and performers often demonstrate a stereotypical way of playing and these are idiosyncratic models, which include positive and negative aspects of performance. Patterns of play will begin to establish over a period of time but the greater the database then the more accurate the model. An established model provides for the opportunity to compare single performance against it. The modelling of competitive sport is an informative analytic technique because it directs the attention of the modeller to the critical aspects of data that delineate successful performance. The modeller searches for an underlying signature of sport performance, which is a reliable predictor of future sport behaviour. Stochastic models have not yet, to our knowledge, been used further to investigate sport at the behavioural level of analysis. However, the modelling procedure is readily applicable to other sports and could lead to useful and interesting results.

Once notational analysis systems are used to collect amounts of data that are sufficiently large enough to define 'norms' of behaviour, then all the ensuing outcomes of the work are based upon the principles of modelling. It is an implicit assumption in notational analysis that in presenting a performance profile of a team or an individual that a 'normative profile' has been achieved. Inherently this implies that all the variables that are to be analysed and compared have all stabilised. Most researchers assume that this will have happened if they analyse enough performances. But how many is enough? In the literature there are large differences in sample sizes.

These problems have very serious direct outcomes for the analyst working with coaches and athletes, both in practical and theoretical applications. It is vital that when analysts are presenting profiles of performance that they are definitely stable otherwise any statement about that performance is spurious. The whole process of analysis and feedback of performance has many practical difficulties. The performance analyst working in this applied environment will experience strict deadlines and acute time pressures defined by the date of the next tournament, the schedule and the draw. The need then is to provide coaches with accurate information on as many of the likely opposition players, or teams, in the amount of time available. This may be achieved by the instigation of a library of team and/or player analysis files, which can be extended over time and receive frequent updating. Player files must be regularly updated by adding analyses from recent matches to the database held on each player.

Finally, some scientists have considered the use of a number of sophisticated techniques, such as neural networks, chaos theory, fuzzy logic and catastrophe theory, for recognizing structures, or processes, within sports contests. Each of these system descriptions, while incomplete, may assist in our understanding of the behaviours that form sports contests. Furthermore, these descriptions for sports contests need not be exclusive of each other, and a hybrid type of description (or model) may be appropriate in the future, a suggestion that remains only a point of conjecture at this time.

== Educational applications ==
It is accepted that feedback, if presented at the correct time and in the correct quantity, plays a great part in the learning of new skills and the enhancement of performance. Recent research, however, has shown that the more objective or quantitative the feedback, the greater effect it has on performance. However, in order to gauge the exact effect of feedback alone, complete control conditions would be needed in order to minimise the effect of other external variables, which is by definition impossible in real competitive environments. This experimental design is also made more difficult because working with elite athletes precludes large numbers of subjects.

Hughes and Robertson (1997) were using notation systems as an adjunct to a spectrum of tactical models that they have created for squash. The hand notation systems are used by the Welsh national youth squads, the actual notation being completed by the players, for the players. It is believed that in this way the tactical awareness of the players, doing the notation, are heightened by their administration of these systems. This type of practical educational use of notation systems has been used in a number of teams sports, soccer, rugby union, rugby league, basketball, cricket, and so on, by players in the squads, substitutes, injured players, as a way of enhancing their understanding of their sport, as well as providing statistics on their team.
