= Sarah Rudd =

Sports analyst (soccer)

Sarah Rudd is one of the early pioneers of sports analytics applied to soccer. In 2011, Rudd developed a method, based on Markov chains, for evaluating the performance of players. This method was later adopted by several other companies, academics and bloggers to evaluate actions from soccer event data.

Soon after presenting her work, Rudd worked for the startup StatsDNA which was acquired by Arsenal FC in 2013. She is currently head of Analytics and Software Development at the Arsenal FC Data Analytics group. Her work is reported to have been highly influential within the club.
