= 1998–99 Juventus FC season =

Italian football club season

Juventus
1998–99 season
- President: Vittorio Chiusano
- Manager: Marcello Lippi (until 7 February 1999); Carlo Ancelotti
- Stadium: Stadio delle Alpi
- Serie A: 7th
- Coppa Italia: Quarter-finals
- Supercoppa Italiana: Runners-up
- UEFA Champions League: Semi-finals
- Top goalscorer: League: Filippo Inzaghi (13); All: Filippo Inzaghi (20)
- Average home league attendance: 47,169
Home colours	Away colours	Third colours

The 1998–99 season was Juventus Football Club's 101st in existence and 97th consecutive season in the top flight of Italian football.

== Season summary ==
Juventus endured their worst domestic season since 1990–91, largely due to injury woes plaguing their star players.

Alessandro Del Piero picked up a serious knee injury in the final minutes of a 2–2 draw with Udinese on 8 November 1998. France's World Cup hero Zinedine Zidane was similarly plagued by injury. Having won the World Cup with France the previous July, Zidane promptly picked up a knee injury and further injured himself in November .

Unlike the preceding four seasons, under the guidance of Marcello Lippi, Juventus' attack malfunctioned. In December 1998, Lippi announced his intention to depart the following June to manage Inter. In February Lippi was let go by the club, with successful former Parma coach Carlo Ancelotti taking over.

With Ancelotti at the helm, Juve managed to salvage a little respectability by reaching the semi-finals of the Champions League, drawing the first-leg 1–1 at Old Trafford. Following the first-leg, playmaker Zidane limped off at half-time in Juve's home draw against Bologna on 12 April 1999. Eventual champions Manchester United then defeated Juventus 3–2 at Stadio delle Alpi in the second-leg of the semi-final.

Following that Champions League semi-final defeat, Juve's season ended poorly by their high standards, finishing a lowly seventh in Serie A. Juve had to settle for the relative ignominy of the UEFA Cup the next season.

== Players ==
=== Squad information ===
Note: Flags indicate national team as defined under FIFA eligibility rules; some limited exceptions apply. Players may hold more than one non-FIFA nationality.

No.	Pos.	Nation	Player
1	GK	ITA	Angelo Peruzzi (vice-captain)
2	DF	ITA	Ciro Ferrara
3	DF	YUG	Zoran Mirković
4	DF	URU	Paolo Montero
6	FW	FRA	Thierry Henry
7	MF	ITA	Angelo Di Livio
8	MF	ITA	Antonio Conte (captain)
9	FW	ITA	Filippo Inzaghi
10	FW	ITA	Alessandro Del Piero
11	FW	URU	Daniel Fonseca
12	GK	ITA	Morgan De Sanctis
13	DF	ITA	Mark Iuliano
14	MF	FRA	Didier Deschamps
15	DF	ITA	Alessandro Birindelli
16	FW	ITA	Nicola Amoruso
17	DF	ITA	Gianluca Pessotto

No.	Pos.	Nation	Player
18	MF	FRA	Jocelyn Blanchard
19	DF	CRO	Igor Tudor
20	MF	ITA	Alessio Tacchinardi
21	MF	FRA	Zinedine Zidane
22	GK	ITA	Michelangelo Rampulla
23	MF	ITA	Simone Perrotta
25	DF	ITA	Massimo Paci
26	MF	NED	Edgar Davids
27	DF	ITA	Massimiliano Marchio
28	MF	ITA	Luca Pellegrini
29	MF	ITA	Marco Rigoni
30	MF	ITA	Salvatore Papa
31	DF	ITA	Francesco Scardina
32	MF	ITA	Manuel Sinato
33	GK	ITA	Stefano Pergolizzi
34	FW	ARG	Juan Esnáider

=== Transfers ===
In
Pos.	Name	from
DF	Zoran Mirković	Atalanta
DF	Igor Tudor	Hajduk Split
MF	Jocelyn Blanchard	Metz
MF	Simone Perrotta	Reggina

Out
Pos.	Name	to	
DF	Moreno Torricelli	Fiorentina	
MF	Raffaele Ametrano	Genoa	loan
DF	Salvatore Aronica	Reggina	
DF	César Pellegrín	Ternana	

==== Winter ====
In
Pos.	Name	from	
FW	Thierry Henry	Monaco	U$14.5 million
FW	Juan Esnáider	Espanyol	

Out
Pos.	Name	to	
DF	Dimas Teixeira	Fenerbahçe	
MF	Fabio Pecchia	Sampdoria	loan
FW	Marcelo Zalayeta	Empoli	loan

== Competitions ==
=== Supercoppa Italiana ===
29 August 1998	Juventus	1–2	Lazio	Turin, Italy
20:30 CEST (UTC+2)	Del Piero 87' (pen.)	Report	Nedvěd 38'; Conceição 90+4'	Stadium: Stadio delle Alpi; Attendance: 16,500; Referee: Roberto Bettin

=== Serie A ===
==== League table ====
Pos	Team	Pld	W	D	L	GF	GA	GD	Pts	Qualification or relegation
5	Roma	34	15	9	10	69	49	+20	54 (Note: ROM 7pts. JUV 5pts. UDI 4pts.)	Qualification to UEFA Cup first round
6	Udinese (Note: Udinese gained entry to the 1999–2000 UEFA Cup winning the UEFA Cup qualification match against Juventus)	34	16	6	12	52	52	0	54	Qualification to UEFA Cup first round
7	Juventus (Note: Juventus qualified to the 1999 UEFA Intertoto Cup Third round.)	34	15	9	10	42	36	+6	54	Qualification to Intertoto Cup third round
8	Inter Milan	34	13	7	14	59	54	+5	46	
9	Bologna (Note: Bologna gained entry to the 1999–2000 UEFA Cup winning the cup third place UEFA Cup qualification match against Inter Milan)	34	11	11	12	44	47	−3	44	Qualification to UEFA Cup first round

Source: Serie A, RSSSF.com, Soccerway
Rules for classification: 1) Points; 2) Head-to-head points; 3) Head-to-head goal difference; 4) Goal difference; 5) Goals scored; 6) Draw. (Note: Head-to-head record is used only after all the matches between the teams in question have been played).

==== Results summary ====
Overall								Home						Away					
Pld	W	D	L	GF	GA	GD	Pts	W	D	L	GF	GA	GD	W	D	L	GF	GA	GD
34	15	9	10	42	36	+6	54	10	4	3	25	16	+9	5	5	7	17	20	−3

Last updated: 23 May 1999.
Source: Competitive matches

==== Results by round ====
Round	1	2	3	4	5	6	7	8	9	10	11	12	13	14	15	16	17	18	19	20	21	22	23	24	25	26	27	28	29	30	31	32	33	34
Ground	A	H	A	H	A	H	H	A	A	H	A	H	A	H	A	H	A	H	A	H	A	H	A	A	H	H	A	H	A	H	A	H	A	H
Result	W	W	L	W	D	W	W	D	L	D	L	L	L	W	D	D	D	W	L	L	W	W	D	W	W	D	L	D	W	W	L	L	W	W
Position	4	3	6	4	4	2	1	2	3	4	5	6	9	8	7	7	9	7	7	9	8	7	8	6	5	6	7	7	6	6	6	7	6	7

Source: Competitive matches
A = Away; H = Home; W = Win; D = Draw; L = Loss; = Leader, UEFA Champions League Group stage; = UEFA Champions League Group stage; = UEFA Champions League Qualifying round; = 1999-2000 UEFA Cup; = 1999 UEFA Intertoto Cup

==== Matches ====
13 September 1998 1	Perugia	3–4	Juventus	Perugia
	Nakata 52', 59'; Bernardini 87' (pen.)	Report	22' Davids; 32' Tudor; 45'Pessotto; 65' Fonseca	Stadium: Renato Curi; Attendance: 25,005; Referee: Daniele Tombolini

20 September 1998 2	Juventus	1–0	Cagliari	Turin
	Inzaghi 8'	Report		Stadium: Stadio delle Alpi; Attendance: 50,000; Referee: Domenico Messina

26 September 1998 3	Parma	1–0	Juventus	Parma
20:30 CEST (UTC+02:00)	D. Baggio 47'	Report		Stadium: Stadio Ennio Tardini; Referee: Cosimo Bolognino

4 October 1998 4	Juventus	1–0	Piacenza	Turin
15:30 CEST (UTC+02:00)	Inzaghi 8'	Report		Stadium: Stadio delle Alpi; Referee: Emilio Pellegrino

18 October 1998 5	Vicenza	1–1	Juventus	Vicenza
15:30 CEST (UTC+02:00)	Zauli 40'	Report	Del Piero 45'	Stadium: Stadio Romeo Menti; Referee: Salvatore Racalbuto

25 October 1998 6	Juventus	1–0	Internazionale	Turin
20:30 CET (UTC+01:00)	Del Piero 87' (pen.)	Report		Stadium: Stadio delle Alpi; Referee: Domenico Messina

1 November 1998 7	Juventus	2–0	Sampdoria	Turin
14:30 CET (UTC+01:00)	Inzaghi 44', 59'	Report		Stadium: delle Alpi; Referee: Cosimo Bolognino

8 November 1998 8	Udinese	2–2	Juventus	Udine
14:30 CET (UTC+01:00)	Bachini 65'; Sosa 90+4'	Report	44' Zidane; 49' Inzaghi	Stadium: Friuli; Referee: Graziano Cesari

15 November 1998 9	Roma	2–0	Juventus	Rome
14:30 CET (UTC+01:00)	Paulo Sérgio 45'; Candela 87'	Report		Stadium: Olimpico; Referee: Stefano Braschi

22 November 1998 10	Juventus	0–0	Empoli	Turin
14:30 CET (UTC+01:00)		Report		Stadium: Stadio delle Alpi; Referee: Emilio Pellegrino

29 November 1998 11	Bologna	3–0	Juventus	Bologna
14:30 CET (UTC+01:00)	Paramatti 3'; Signori 9'; Fontolan 28'	Report		Stadium: Stadio Renato Dall'Ara; Referee: Graziano Cesari

6 December 1998 12	Juventus	0–1	Lazio	Turin
14:30 CET (UTC+01:00)		Report	Salas 82'	Stadium: Stadio delle Alpi; Referee: Gennaro Borriello

13 December 1998 13	Fiorentina	1–0	Juventus	Florence
20:30 CET (UTC+01:00)	Batistuta 58'	Report		Stadium: Artemio Franchi; Referee: Stefano Farina

20 December 1998 14	Juventus	3–0	Salernitana	Turin
14:30 CET (UTC+01:00)	Inzaghi 20', 29', 87'	Report		Stadium: Stadio delle Alpi; Referee: Gennaro Borriello

6 January 1999 15	Milan	1–1	Juventus	Milan
20:30 CET (UTC+01:00)	Albertini 27' (pen.)	Report	Fonseca 85'	Stadium: San Siro; Referee: Roberto Bettin

10 January 1999 16	Juventus	1–1	Bari	Turin
14:30 CET (UTC+01:00)	Davids 47'	Report	D. Andersson 76' (pen.)	Stadium: Stadio delle Alpi; Referee: Stefano Farina

17 January 1999 17	Venezia	1–1	Juventus	Venice
14:30 CET (UTC+01:00)	Pedone 6'	Report	Fonseca 54'	Stadium: Stadio Pier Luigi Penzo; Referee: Massimo De Santis

24 January 1999 18	Juventus	2–1	Perugia	Turin
14:30 CET (UTC+01:00)	Fonseca 49'; Zidane 55'	Report	Kaviedes 20'	Stadium: Stadio delle Alpi; Referee: Cosimo Bolognino

31 January 1999 19	Cagliari	1–0	Juventus	Cagliari
14:30 CET (UTC+01:00)	Berretta 17'	Report		Stadium: Stadio Sant'Elia; Referee: Piero Ceccarini

7 February 1999 20	Juventus	2–4	Parma	Turin
20:30 CET (UTC+01:00)	Tacchinardi 15'; Fonseca 72'	Report	35', 40', 58' Crespo; 39'Chiesa	Stadium: delle Alpi; Referee: Robert Anthony Boggi

14 February 1999 21	Piacenza	0–2	Juventus	Piacenza
15:00 CET (UTC+01:00)		Report	Manighetti 45+1' (o.g.); Birindelli 90+5'	Stadium: Stadio Leonardo Garilli; Referee: Domenico Messina

21 February 1999 22	Juventus	2–0	Vicenza	Turin
15:00 CET (UTC+01:00)	Amoruso 11'; Conte 29'	Report		Stadium: Stadio delle Alpi; Referee: Piero Ceccarini

27 February 1999 23	Internazionale	0–0	Juventus	Milan
20:30 CET (UTC+01:00)		Report		Stadium: San Siro; Referee: Daniele Tombolini

7 March 1999 24	Sampdoria	1–2	Juventus	Genoa
20:30 CET (UTC+01:00)	Ortega 64'	Report	Amoruso 74'; Inzaghi 90'	Stadium: Stadio Luigi Ferraris; Referee: Stefano Farina

13 March 1999 25	Juventus	2–1	Udinese	Turin
15:00 CET (UTC+01:00)	Fonseca 29'; Inzaghi 76'	Report	Sosa 48'	Stadium: Stadio delle Alpi; Referee: Emilio Pellegrino

21 March 1999 26	Juventus	1–1	Roma	Turin
15:00 CET (UTC+01:00)	Iuliano 72'	Report	52' Delvecchio	Stadium: Stadio delle Alpi; Referee: Gennaro Borriello

3 April 1999 27	Empoli	1–0	Juventus	Empoli
16:00 CEST (UTC+02:00)	Bianconi 26'	Report		Stadium: Stadio Carlo Castellani; Referee: Livio Bazzoli

11 April 1999 28	Juventus	2–2	Bologna	Turin
16:00 CEST (UTC+02:00)	Inzaghi 17'; Di Livio 81'	Report	Kolyvanov 34'; Cappioli 52'	Stadium: Stadio delle Alpi; Referee: Cosimo Bolognino

17 April 1999 29	Lazio	1–3	Juventus	Rome
16:00 CEST (UTC+02:00)	Mancini 56'	Report	Henry 34', 64'; Amoruso 45+3'	Stadium: Stadio Olimpico; Referee: Livio Bazzoli

25 April 1999 30	Juventus	2–1	Fiorentina	Turin
16:00 CEST (UTC+02:00)	Inzaghi 24'; Conte 87'	Report	Tacchinardi 85' (o.g.)	Stadium: Stadio delle Alpi; Referee: Fiorenzo Treossi

2 May 1999 31	Salernitana	1–0	Juventus	Salerno
16:00 CEST (UTC+02:00)	Di Vaio 37'	Report		Stadium: Stadio Arechi; Referee: Gennaro Borriello

9 May 1999 32	Juventus	0–2	Milan	Turin
16:00 CEST (UTC+02:00)		Report	Weah 46', 64'	Stadium: Stadio delle Alpi; Referee: Graziano Cesari

16 May 1999 33	Bari	0–1	Juventus	Bari
16:30 CEST (UTC+02:00)		Report	Conte 83'	Stadium: Stadio San Nicola; Referee: Robert Boggi

23 May 1999 34	Juventus	3–2	Venezia	Turin
16:30 CEST (UTC+02:00)	Conte 12'; Inzaghi 45'; Henry 85'	Report	Pedone 63'; Recoba 90'	Stadium: Stadio delle Alpi; Referee: Gennaro Borriello

=== UEFA Cup qualification ===
28 May 1999 First leg	Udinese	0–0	Juventus	Udine
20:45 CEST (UTC+02:00)				Stadium: Stadio Friuli; Referee: Graziano Cesari

31 May 1999 Second leg	Juventus	1–1 (1–1a agg.)	Udinese	Turin
20:45 CEST (UTC+02:00)	Inzaghi 23' (pen.)		Poggi 71'	Stadium: Stadio delle Alpi; Referee: Stefano Braschi

=== Coppa Italia ===
==== Second round ====
10 September 1998 First leg	Ravenna	0–2	Juventus	Ravenna
		Report	Di Livio 70'; Fonseca 83'	Stadium: Stadio Bruno Benelli; Attendance: 12,000; Referee: Gennaro Borriello

23 September 1998 Second leg	Juventus	4–0 (6–0 agg.)	Ravenna	Turin
	Fonseca 35', 59'; Zalayeta 73', 78'	Report		Stadium: Stadio delle Alpi; Attendance: 583; Referee: Mucini

==== Round of 16 ====
27 October 1998 First leg	Juventus	1–1	Venezia	Turin
	Amoruso 11'	Report	Luppi 73' (pen.)	Stadium: Stadio delle Alpi; Attendance: 561; Referee: Graziano Cesari

11 November 1998 Second leg	Venezia	2–2 (a.e.t.) (3–3a agg.)	Juventus	Venice
	Tuta 87'; Luppi 107' (pen.)	Report	Fonseca 88' (pen.); Ferrara 109'	Stadium: Stadio Pier Luigi Penzo; Attendance: 11,101; Referee: Pasquale Rodomonti

==== Quarter-finals ====
13 January 1999 First leg	Juventus	1–2	Bologna	Turin
	Perrotta 13'	Report	Boselli 74'; Ingesson 90' (pen.)	Stadium: Stadio delle Alpi; Attendance: 8,000; Referee: Domenico Messina

26 January 1999 Second leg	Bologna	0–1 (2a–2 agg.)	Juventus	Bologna
		Report	Davids 78'	Stadium: Stadio Renato Dall'Ara; Attendance: 23,000; Referee: Salvatore Racalbuto

=== UEFA Champions League ===
==== Group stage ====
Pos	Team	Pld	W	D	L	GF	GA	GD	Pts	Qualification
1	(Italy) Juventus	6	1	5	0	7	5	+2	8	Advance to knockout stage
2	(Turkey) Galatasaray	6	2	2	2	8	8	0	8	
3	(Norway) Rosenborg	6	2	2	2	7	8	−1	8	
4	(Spain) Athletic Bilbao	6	1	3	2	5	6	−1	6	

Source: UEFA

16 September 1998 1	Juventus (Italy)	2–2	(Turkey) Galatasaray	Turin, Italy
20:45 CEST (UTC+02:00)	Inzaghi 17'; Birindelli 69'	Report	Şükür 44'; Ümit 63'	Stadium: Stadio delle Alpi; Attendance: 37,192; Referee: Markus Merk (Germany)

30 September 1998 2	Rosenborg (Norway)	1–1	(Italy) Juventus	Trondheim, Norway
20:45 CEST (UTC+02:00)	Skammelsrud 69' (pen.)	Report	Inzaghi 26'	Stadium: Lerkendal stadion Attendance: 15,385; Referee: Armand Ancion (Belgium)

21 October 1998 3	Athletic Bilbao (Spain)	0–0	(Italy) Juventus	Bilbao, Spain
20:45 CEST (UTC+02:00)		Report		Stadium: San Mamés; Attendance: 39,000; Referee: Kim Milton Nielsen (Denmark)

4 November 1998 4	Juventus (Italy)	1–1	(Spain) Athletic Bilbao	Turin, Italy
20:45 CET (UTC+01:00)	Lasa 68' (o.g.)	Report	Guerrero 45'	Stadium: Stadio delle Alpi; Attendance: 44,584; Referee: Hugh Dallas (Scotland)

2 December 1998 5	Galatasaray (Turkey)	1–1	(Italy) Juventus	Istanbul, Turkey
20:45 CET (UTC+01:00)	Suat 90'	Report	Amoruso 78'	Stadium: Ali Sami Yen Stadium; Attendance: 22,920; Referee: Gilles Veissière (France)

9 December 1998 6	Juventus (Italy)	2–0	(Norway) Rosenborg	Turin, Italy
20:45 CET (UTC+01:00)	Inzaghi 16'; Amoruso 36'	Report		Stadium: Stadio delle Alpi; Attendance: 7,174; Referee: Mario van der Ende (Netherlands)

==== Knockout phase ====
===== Quarter-finals =====
3 March 1999 First leg	Juventus (Italy)	2–1	(Greece) Olympiacos	Turin, Italy
20:45 CET (UTC+01:00)	Inzaghi 38'; Conte 78'	Report	Niniadis 90+' (pen.)	Stadium: Stadio delle Alpi; Attendance: 33,871; Referee: José María García-Aranda (Spain)

17 March 1999 Second leg	Olympiacos (Greece)	1–1 (2–3 agg.)	(Italy) Juventus	Athens, Greece
20:45 CET (UTC+01:00)	Gogić 13'	Report	Conte 85'	Stadium: Olympic Stadium; Attendance: 75,000; Referee: Markus Merk (Germany)

===== Semi-finals =====
7 April 1999 First leg	Manchester United (England)	1–1	(Italy) Juventus	Manchester, England
20:45 CEST (UTC+02:00)	Giggs 90+2'	Report	Conte 25'	Stadium: Old Trafford; Attendance: 54,487; Referee: Manuel Díaz Vega (Spain)

21 April 1999 Second leg	Juventus (Italy)	2–3 (3–4 agg.)	(England) Manchester United	Turin, Italy
20:45 CEST (UTC+02:00)	Inzaghi 6', 11'	Report	Keane 24'; Yorke 34'; Cole 83'	Stadium: Stadio delle Alpi; Attendance: 60,806; Referee: Urs Meier (Switzerland)

== Statistics ==
=== Players statistics ===
No.	Pos	Nat	Player	Total		Serie A		Coppa		Champions League	
No.	Pos	Nat	Player	Apps	Goals	Apps	Goals	Apps	Goals	Apps	Goals
1	GK	(Italy) ITA	Peruzzi	33	0	25	0	0	0	8	0
13	DF	(Italy) ITA	Iuliano	32	1	18+2	1	4	0	8	0
19	DF	(Croatia) CRO	Tudor	33	1	18+5	1	4	0	6	0
4	DF	(Uruguay) URU	Montero	33	0	22	0	2	0	9	0
17	DF	(Italy) ITA	Pessotto	32	1	15+4	1	5	0	8	0
7	MF	(Italy) ITA	Di Livio	45	2	28+5	1	4	1	8	0
14	MF	(France) FRA	Deschamps	39	0	26+3	0	1	0	9	0
26	MF	(Netherlands) NED	Davids	40	3	27	2	4	1	9	0
8	MF	(Italy) ITA	Conte	37	7	23+6	4	2	0	6	3
21	MF	(France) FRA	Zidane	39	2	24+1	2	4	0	10	0
9	FW	(Italy) ITA	Inzaghi	39	19	25+3	13	1	0	10	6
22	GK	(Italy) ITA	Rampulla	16	0	7	0	5	0	4	0
15	DF	(Italy) ITA	Birindelli	34	2	17+7	1	2	0	8	1
20	MF	(Italy) ITA	Tacchinardi	35	1	17+6	1	4	0	8	0
2	DF	(Italy) ITA	Ferrara	23	1	17+1	0	2	1	3	0
3	DF	(Federal Republic of Yugoslavia) YUG	Mirkovic	28	1	13+6	0	5	0	4	1
16	FW	(Italy) ITA	Amoruso	28	6	12+8	3	3	1	5	2
6	FW	(France) FRA	Henry	17	3	12+4	3	1	0	0	0
11	FW	(Uruguay) URU	Fonseca	34	10	8+17	6	5	4	4	0
10	FW	(Italy) ITA	Del Piero	13	2	8	2	1	0	4	0
34	FW	(Argentina) ARG	Esnaider	12	0	7+3	0	1	0	1	0
12	GK	(Italy) ITA	De Sanctis	4	0	2+1	0	1	0	0	0
18	MF	(France) FRA	Blanchard	21	0	2+10	0	6	0	3	0
23	MF	(Italy) ITA	Perrotta	12	1	1+4	0	6	1	1	0
25	DF	(Italy) ITA	Paci	0	0	0	0	0	0	0	0
27	DF	(Italy) ITA	Marchio	1	0	0	0	1	0	0	0
28	MF	(Italy) ITA	Pellegrini	0	0	0	0	0	0	0	0
29	MF	(Italy) ITA	Rigoni	6	0	0+1	0	5	0	0	0
5	MF	(Italy) ITA	Pecchia	2	0	0	0	2	0	0	0
24	FW	(Uruguay) URU	Zalayeta	3	2	0+1	0	1	2	1	0
35	DF	(Portugal) POR	Dimas	3	0	0+1	0	2	0	0	0
30	MF	(Italy) ITA	Papa	0	0	0	0	0	0	0	0
31	DF	(Italy) ITA	Scardina	0	0	0	0	0	0	0	0
32	MF	(Italy) ITA	Sinato	0	0	0	0	0	0	0	0
33	GK	(Italy) ITA	Pergolizzi	0	0	0	0	0	0	0	0
