= Juventus FC 2–3 Manchester United F.C. =

1999 UEFA Champions League match

Juventus 2–3 Manchester United
- Event: 1998–99 UEFA Champions League semi-final – second leg
Juventus	Manchester United
(Italy)	(England)
2	3
- Manchester United won 4–3 on aggregate
- Date: 21 April 1999
- Venue: Stadio Delle Alpi, Turin
- Referee: Urs Meier (Switzerland)
- Attendance: 60,806

The second leg of the 1998–99 UEFA Champions League semi-final between Juventus and Manchester United was a football match that took place at the Stadio Delle Alpi in Turin, Italy, on 21 April 1999. Manchester United won the match 3–2; combined with a 1–1 draw in the first leg, that gave them a 4–3 aggregate win and sent them to the 1999 UEFA Champions League final.

Having gone 2–0 down to early goals from Filippo Inzaghi, the win is often described as one of Manchester United's greatest ever. It is particularly notable for Roy Keane's performance, often described as one of the best individual performances in a football match ever; Keane scored United's first goal, sparking the comeback. Dwight Yorke scored Manchester United's equaliser, before Andy Cole scored the winning goal late in the game.

== Background ==
Manchester United were aiming to be the first English club to reach the European Cup / Champions League final since Liverpool in 1985. Juventus had been one of the strongest teams in European football during the 1990s; they had reached the Champions League final in each of the previous three seasons, winning the tournament in 1996. United had played Juventus in the 1996–97 and 1997–98 seasons of the Champions League; the Italians had won three of these meetings 1–0 each time whilst United won the other three by a 3–2 scoreline.

The first leg of the tie, played at Old Trafford in Manchester, was dominated by Juventus but ended in a 1–1 draw; Antonio Conte scored an early goal for Juventus that was matched by a late equaliser from Ryan Giggs.

This meant that whichever team won the second leg would advance to the 1999 UEFA Champions League Final, and Juventus, with home advantage, were strong favourites to do so, United veteran George Best saying the team needed "a miracle." Under the away goals rule that applied at the time, Juventus would also advance if the second leg ended 0–0; if it was 1–1, the tie would go to golden-goal extra time and possibly a penalty shootout; if it was 2–2 or a higher-scoring draw, United would advance.

Under the competition's rules at the time, a player who received two yellow cards in that season's tournament at any point would be suspended for one game. Twelve players in the matchday squads had received yellow cards earlier in the season and would be suspended for the final if they were booked in this game and qualify: Denis Irwin, Ronny Johnsen, Roy Keane, Paul Scholes and Phil Neville for United; Antonio Conte, Didier Deschamps, Edgar Davids, Angelo Di Livio, Zinedine Zidane, Paolo Montero and Angelo Peruzzi for Juventus.

== Route to the semi-final ==
(Italy) Juventus				Round	(England) Manchester United			
Opponent	Agg.	1st leg	2nd leg	Qualifying round	Opponent	Agg.	1st leg	2nd leg
Bye				Second qualifying round	(Poland) ŁKS Łódź	2–0	2–0 (H)	0–0 (A)
Opponent	Result			Group stage	Opponent	Result		
(Turkey) Galatasaray	2–2 (H)			Matchday 1	(Spain) Barcelona	3–3 (H)		
(Norway) Rosenborg	1–1 (A)			Matchday 2	(Germany) Bayern Munich	2–2 (A)		
(Spain) Athletic Bilbao	0–0 (A)			Matchday 3	(Denmark) Brøndby	6–2 (A)		
(Spain) Athletic Bilbao	1–1 (H)			Matchday 4	(Denmark) Brøndby	5–0 (H)		
(Turkey) Galatasaray	1–1 (A)			Matchday 5	(Spain) Barcelona	3–3 (A)		
(Norway) Rosenborg	2–0 (H)			Matchday 6	(Germany) Bayern Munich	1–1 (H)		
Group B winners: Pos / Team / Pld / Pts; 1 / (Italy) Juventus / 6 / 8; 2 / (Turkey) Galatasaray / 6 / 8; 3 / (Norway) Rosenborg / 6 / 8; 4 / (Spain) Athletic Bilbao / 6 / 6; Source: UEFA				Final standings	Group D runners-up: Pos / Team / Pld / Pts; 1 / (Germany) Bayern Munich / 6 / 11; 2 / (England) Manchester United / 6 / 10; 3 / (Spain) Barcelona / 6 / 8; 4 / (Denmark) Brøndby / 6 / 3; Source: UEFA			
Opponent	Agg.	1st leg	2nd leg	Knockout stage	Opponent	Agg.	1st leg	2nd leg
(Greece) Olympiacos	3–2	2–1 (H)	1–1 (A)	Quarter-finals	(Italy) Inter Milan	3–1	2–0 (H)	1–1 (A)
(England) Manchester United		1–1 (A)		Semi-finals	(Italy) Juventus		1–1 (H)	

=== Juventus ===
As winners of the 1997–98 Serie A title, Juventus qualified for the 1998–99 UEFA Champions League group stage automatically and were placed into Pot 1 for the draw, along with title holders Real Madrid and the domestic champions of Germany, Spain, France and the Netherlands: 1. FC Kaiserslautern, Barcelona, Lens and Ajax. They were drawn into Group B along with Spanish club Athletic Bilbao, Norwegian side Rosenborg and Galatasaray from Turkey.

After five straight draws – a Champions League record at the time – Juventus went into the final matchday needing to beat Rosenborg at the Stadio Delle Alpi and hope that Galatasaray lost to Athletic Bilbao at San Mamés. First-half goals from Filippo Inzaghi and Nicola Amoruso gave Juventus the victory they required, while Athletic's Julen Guerrero scored the only goal in the other game. That left the top three teams level on eight points; their order was determined by their head-to-head record, and since Galatasaray and Rosenborg had beaten each other in their matches on Matchdays 3 and 4, the three teams were separated by Juventus' final-day victory over the Norwegians. That made Juventus the first club to reach the Champions League knockout phase without winning any of their first five group matches.

Juventus were paired with Group A winners Olympiacos in the quarter-finals. A 2–1 win at the Stadio Delle Alpi in the first leg gave Juventus the advantage thanks to goals from Inzaghi and Antonio Conte; however, a late penalty from Andreas Niniadis meant Olympiacos only needed to win 1–0 in Athens to go through on the away goals rule. Siniša Gogić scored in the 12th minute to give the Greek side the scoreline they needed, but Conte scored in the 85th minute to make it 1–1 and send Juventus through with a 3–2 aggregate win.

=== Manchester United ===
Manchester United were the runners-up in the 1997–98 FA Premier League season, so they had to take part in qualifying in order to reach the Champions League group stage. They were drawn against Polish champions ŁKS Łódź, and goals from Ryan Giggs and Andy Cole in the first leg at Old Trafford gave them a 2–0 aggregate win. Because England ranked only sixth in the UEFA association club coefficient rankings, Manchester United were placed in Pot 3 for the group stage draw, along with Benfica, Olympiacos, Panathinaikos, Rosenborg and Sturm Graz. They were drawn into Group D along with Spanish champions Barcelona, German side Bayern Munich and Danish champions Brøndby in what became known as the "group of death".

United were in third place after their opening two matches – draws at home to Barcelona (3–3) and away to Bayern (2–2) – but victories of 6–2 and 5–0 over Brøndby on Matchdays 3 and 4 put them top with two matches to play. Another 3–3 draw with Barcelona meant Bayern were able to go ahead by a point in the group standings with a 2–0 win over Brøndby, leaving United needing victory over Bayern on the final day to guarantee qualification as group winners; only the two best-ranked runners-up went through to the quarter-finals. Roy Keane put United ahead just before half-time, but Hasan Salihamidžić's equaliser 10 minutes into the second half meant the match finished 1–1. Bayern won the group, but United's 10 points were enough to put them through as the second-best runners-up.

In the quarter-finals, United faced Italian side Internazionale. They won the first leg at Old Trafford 2–0 thanks to first-half goals from Dwight Yorke, and Inter's failure to score an away goal further increased United's advantage. Nicola Ventola pulled a goal back for the Italians midway through the second half of the return leg at the San Siro, but Paul Scholes' away goal two minutes from the end assured a 3–1 aggregate win for United.

== Match ==
=== Team selection ===
Juventus made two changes to their team from the first leg, both in their back four: in the centre, Montero was replaced by Ciro Ferrara, while Alessandro Birindelli replaced Zoran Mirković at right-back; Mirković was suspended, having picked up a second booking of the knockout phase in the first leg. Manchester United made three changes: Johnsen came in for fellow Norwegian Henning Berg to partner Jaap Stam in defence, Nicky Butt stood in for Scholes in central midfield, and Jesper Blomqvist took the place of Ryan Giggs on the left wing. Giggs had been carrying an injury to his left ankle, which had been put in plaster immediately after United's 2–1 win over Arsenal in the FA Cup semi-final replay, in which he scored the winning goal; United refused to rule him out for the Juventus game until the last minute, but he was ultimately deemed not fit enough for even a place on the bench.

=== Summary ===
Juventus took an early lead, with Filippo Inzaghi scoring twice in the first 11 minutes. Roy Keane scored for United but then was booked for a reckless tackle, meaning he would be suspended for the final if United reached it. Dwight Yorke then scored to make it 2–2 at half-time. Under the away goals rule, this meant Manchester United would go through if the score stayed the same. Paul Scholes came on as a substitute and was also booked, meaning he also faced suspension for the final. Andy Cole scored a late goal to make Manchester United's victory certain; they won 3–2 on the night and 4–3 on aggregate.

=== Details ===
21 April 1999
20:45 UTC+2

Juventus (Italy)	2–3	(England) Manchester United
Inzaghi 6', 11'	Report	Keane 24'; Yorke 34'; Cole 83'

Stadio Delle Alpi, Turin
Attendance: 60,806
Referee: Urs Meier (Switzerland)

Juventus	Manchester United

GK	1	(Italy) Angelo Peruzzi
RB	15	(Italy) Alessandro Birindelli		(substituted off) 46'
CB	2	(Italy) Ciro Ferrara
CB	13	(Italy) Mark Iuliano		(substituted off) 46'
LB	17	(Italy) Gianluca Pessotto
RM	8	(Italy) Antonio Conte (c)
CM	14	(France) Didier Deschamps
CM	26	(Netherlands) Edgar Davids	(yellow card) 53'
LM	7	(Italy) Angelo Di Livio		(substituted off) 80'
AM	21	(France) Zinedine Zidane
CF	9	(Italy) Filippo Inzaghi
Substitutes:
GK	22	(Italy) Michelangelo Rampulla
DF	4	(Uruguay) Paolo Montero		(substituted on) 46'
DF	19	(Croatia) Igor Tudor
MF	20	(Italy) Alessio Tacchinardi
FW	11	(Uruguay) Daniel Fonseca		(substituted on) 80'
FW	16	(Italy) Nicola Amoruso		(substituted on) 46'
FW	34	(Argentina) Juan Esnáider
Manager:
(Italy) Carlo Ancelotti

GK	1	(Denmark) Peter Schmeichel
RB	2	(England) Gary Neville
CB	5	(Norway) Ronny Johnsen
CB	6	(Netherlands) Jaap Stam
LB	3	(Republic of Ireland) Denis Irwin
RM	7	(England) David Beckham
CM	16	(Republic of Ireland) Roy Keane (c)	(yellow card) 33'
CM	8	(England) Nicky Butt
LM	15	(Sweden) Jesper Blomqvist		(substituted off) 68'
CF	19	(Trinidad and Tobago) Dwight Yorke
CF	9	(England) Andy Cole
Substitutes:
GK	17	(Netherlands) Raimond van der Gouw
DF	4	(England) David May
DF	12	(England) Phil Neville
DF	30	(England) Wes Brown
MF	18	(England) Paul Scholes	(yellow card) 76'	(substituted on) 68'
FW	10	(England) Teddy Sheringham
FW	20	(Norway) Ole Gunnar Solskjær
Manager:
(Scotland) Alex Ferguson

== Aftermath ==
United manager Alex Ferguson praised Keane's performance in his autobiography:

If we qualified for the final in Barcelona, suspension would make Roy a spectator. I didn't think I could have a higher opinion of any footballer than I already had of the Irishman but he rose even further in my estimation at the Stadio Delle Alpi. The minute he was booked and out of the final, he seemed to redouble his efforts to get the team there.

It was the most emphatic display of selflessness I have seen on a football field. Pounding over every blade of grass, competing as if he would rather die of exhaustion than lose, he inspired all around him. I felt it was an honour to be associated with such a player. When he leapt to meet a Beckham corner and headed in our first goal, it was if his will had given the ball no choice but to land in the net.

Keane dismissed this praise, saying that to praise him was "like praising the postman for delivering letters." Writing for The Guardian, Scott Murray and Rob Smyth said that Keane's "most significant contribution was offensive: not just his richly symbolic goal to get United back in the contest, but his rhythmic, hypnotic passing, particularly at 2-0 down, that got United going and broke the will of Juventus, who looked into his eyes and saw only an absolute certainty that United would go through. They would have been less scared had Keyser Söze walked on to the pitch." However, they questioned whether his performance would have become so famous had he not been suspended.

In the final, Manchester United beat Bayern Munich 2–1. They won another Champions League title in 2008 and reached the final twice more in 2009 and 2011. Juventus have not won the Champions League since this game, being runners-up in 2003, 2015 and 2017.

In 2014, the Champions League rules changed to allow an amnesty on yellow cards after the quarter-final stage, to avoid situations where players ended up being suspended for the final; the suspensions of Scholes and Keane were often cited as the most notable such suspensions.

A video of the Manchester United team celebrating their victory in the dressing room surfaced in 2020. Scholes and Keane were noted for looking unhappy, due to their suspensions. Keane would injure his ankle in the 1999 FA Cup final four days before the Champions League final, which would have ruled him out of the game regardless of his suspension.
