= 2002 Veikkausliiga =

Veikkausliiga
- Season: 2002
- Premiers: HJK Helsinki
- Top goalscorer: Mika Kottila, HJK Helsinki (18)

The 2002 season was the 72nd completed season of Finnish Football League Championship, known as the Veikkausliiga. At the same time it was the 13th season of the Veikkausliiga. This season three teams could promote from the 2nd division and only one would relegate, because the Veikkausliiga would extend its number of participating teams from 12 to 14, starting the 2003 season.

== Overview ==
The Veikkausliiga is administered by the Finnish Football Association and the competition's 2002 season was contested by 12 teams. Following the Preliminary Stage, the higher eight teams progressed to the Championship Group while the lower four teams competed in the promotion/relegation group with the higher 4 teams from the Ykkönen. HJK Helsinki won the championship and qualified for the 2003–04 UEFA Champions League qualification round, while the second and third placed teams qualified for the first qualification round of the 2003–04 UEFA Cup. The fourth placed team qualified for the UEFA Intertoto Cup 2002, while VPS Vaasa were relegated to the Ykkönen.

== Participating clubs ==
In 2002 there were 12 participants in the Veikkausliiga:

- Allianssi Vantaa - previously Atlantis Helsinki
- FC Jazz Pori
- FC Hämeenlinna - Promoted from Ykkönen
- FC Lahti
- Haka Valkeakoski
- HJK Helsinki
- Inter Turku
- Jaro Pietarsaari - Promoted from Ykkönen
- KuPS Kuopio
- MyPa 47 Anjalankoski
- Tampere United
- VPS Vaasa

Location of teams in 2002 Veikkausliiga

== Preliminary stage ==
=== Table ===
Pos	Team	Pld	W	D	L	GF	GA	GD	Pts	Qualification
1	HJK Helsinki	22	15	3	4	36	16	+20	48	Qualification to Championship group
2	MyPa Anjalankoski	22	12	7	3	43	20	+23	43	Qualification to Championship group
3	Haka Valkeakoski	22	11	5	6	31	18	+13	38	Qualification to Championship group
4	Allianssi Vantaa	22	10	4	8	35	36	−1	34	Qualification to Championship group
5	FC Inter Turku	22	8	8	6	28	17	+11	32	Qualification to Championship group
6	Tampere United	22	7	11	4	23	15	+8	32	Qualification to Championship group
7	FC Lahti	22	9	5	8	23	26	−3	32	Qualification to Championship group
8	Jaro Jakobstad	22	7	5	10	23	36	−13	26	Qualification to Championship group
9	KuPS Kuopio	22	6	6	10	26	30	−4	24	Qualification to Relegation group
10	FC Hämeenlinna	22	3	9	10	23	34	−11	18	Qualification to Relegation group
11	VPS Vaasa	22	4	5	13	21	39	−18	17	Qualification to Relegation group
12	FC Jazz Pori	22	4	4	14	17	42	−25	16	Qualification to Relegation group

=== Results ===
Home \ Away	ALL	HAK	HÄM	HJK	INT	JAR	JAZ	KUP	LAH	MYP	TAM	VPS
AC Allianssi		0–3	2–1	2–2	2–0	1–0	5–2	4–2	2–0	2–3	1–1	6–1
FC Haka	4–0		1–1	2–1	0–0	2–1	2–1	0–1	0–1	1–3	1–1	2–1
Hämeenlinna	2–2	0–1		0–1	0–0	0–1	3–0	2–1	2–1	0–0	1–1	2–4
HJK Helsinki	2–0	0–3	4–1		1–0	4–2	1–0	4–0	0–1	1–1	1–0	2–0
Inter Turku	1–0	1–0	4–1	0–1		3–1	0–0	0–0	3–0	1–1	0–1	5–1
Jaro	3–2	0–1	1–1	0–4	2–0		2–0	0–0	0–3	0–3	2–0	2–1
Jazz	0–1	0–3	0–0	0–2	0–5	0–1		2–2	1–2	0–1	1–0	2–0
KuPS	4–0	2–1	1–0	0–1	0–0	2–2	7–1		1–2	2–1	0–1	0–2
Lahti	1–2	0–0	2–2	0–1	0–2	0–0	3–2	2–1		2–1	0–2	0–0
MyPa	4–0	2–1	3–3	3–0	1–1	5–1	1–3	2–0	3–1		0–0	3–0
Tampere United	0–0	2–2	2–0	1–1	3–0	1–1	0–0	3–0	1–1	0–1		2–1
VPS	0–1	0–1	2–1	0–2	2–2	3–1	1–2	0–0	0–1	1–1	1–1	

Legend: Blue = home team win; Yellow = draw; Red = away team win.

== Final stage ==
=== Championship group ===
==== Table ====
Pos	Team	Pld	W	D	L	GF	GA	GD	Pts	Qualification
1	HJK Helsinki (C)	29	20	5	4	51	21	+30	65	Qualification to Champions League first qualifying round
2	MyPa Anjalankoski	29	17	9	3	57	25	+32	60	Qualification to UEFA Cup qualifying round
3	Haka Valkeakoski	29	15	7	7	51	30	+21	52	Qualification to UEFA Cup qualifying round
4	Allianssi Vantaa	29	12	5	12	39	44	−5	41	Qualification to Intertoto Cup first round
5	Tampere United	29	8	15	6	31	24	+7	39	Qualification to Intertoto Cup first round
6	FC Inter Turku	29	9	9	11	33	29	+4	36	
7	Jaro Jakobstad	29	10	6	13	34	46	−12	36	
8	FC Lahti	29	9	6	14	25	44	−19	33	

(C) Champions

==== Results ====
Home \ Away	ALL	HAK	HJK	INT	JAR	MYP	LAH	TAM
AC Allianssi				1–0	0–1	0–3	1–0	
FC Haka	2–1		1–1		4–2			1–1
HJK Helsinki	1–0				2–0	2–2		3–2
Inter Turku		2–5	0–1					0–2
Jaro				1–1			4–1	3–1
MyPa		5–3		2–0	1–0		1–0	
Lahti		0–4	0–5	0–2				
Tampere United	1–1					0–0	1–1	

Legend: Blue = home team win; Yellow = draw; Red = away team win.

=== Relegation group ===
==== Table ====
Pos	Team	Pld	W	D	L	GF	GA	GD	Pts	Promotion or relegation
1	KuPS Kuopio	7	4	1	2	14	4	+10	16	
2	TPS Turku (P)	7	4	2	1	10	9	+1	15	Promotion to Veikkausliiga
3	FC Hämeenlinna	7	3	0	4	8	8	0	11	
4	FC Jokerit (P)	7	3	1	3	13	13	0	10	Promotion to Veikkausliiga
5	FC Jazz Pori	7	2	3	2	6	5	+1	9	
6	FC KooTeePee (P)	7	2	2	3	8	11	−3	9	Promotion to Veikkausliiga
7	VPS Vaasa (R)	7	2	2	3	6	12	−6	9	Relegation to Ykkönen
8	TP-47	7	2	1	4	6	9	−3	7	

(P) Promoted; (R) Relegated

== Leading scorers ==
Rank	Player		Club	Goals
1	Mika Kottila	(Finland)	HJK Helsinki	18
2	Valeri Popovitch	(Russia)	Haka Valkeakoski	17
3	Petteri Kaijasilta	(Finland)	Allianssi Vantaa	13
3	Saku Puhakainen	(Finland)	MyPa 47 Anjalankoski	13
5	Richard Teberio	(Sweden)	Inter Turku	11

== Attendances ==
No.	Club	Average
1	Tampere	3,202
2	HJK	2,770
3	Inter Turku	2,286
4	KuPS	2,279
5	VPS	2,169
6	MyPa	1,741
7	Haka	1,653
8	Jaro	1,549
9	Lahti	1,507
10	Jazz	1,382
11	Allianssi	1,369
12	Hämeenlinna	1,325
