= Mats Gustafsson (footballer) =

Finnish footballer (born 1975)

Personal information
- Date of birth: 12 December 1975 (age 50)
- Height: 1.82 m (6 ft 0 in)
- Position: Right-back

Senior career*
| Years | Team | Apps | (Gls) |
| –1997 | Sund IF | | |
| 1997–2005 | Inter Turku | 178 | (23) |
| 2006–2007 | IFK Mariehamn | 41 | (0) |
| Total | | 219 | (23) |
- * Club domestic league appearances and goals

Mats Gustafsson (born 12 December 1975) is a Finnish former professional footballer who played as a right-back for Finnish clubs IFK Mariehamn and FC Inter Turku.

== Career ==
Gustafsson is a Swedish-speaking Finn from Åland. He moved to FC Inter Turku from Finnish fourth-tier side Sund IF in 1997. He missed the beginning of 2002 season the due to an ankle injury. Having previously played as a striker, he was converted into a right-back in the 2002 season. He played 178 league matches scoring 23 goals for Inter Turku.

In October 2005 it was announced he would join IFK Mariehamn from Inter Turku for the 2006 season. He signed a three-year contract. He made 41 league appearances for IFK Mariehamn.

Gustafsson announced his retirement from playing in November 2007 at the age of 31, with two years left on his contract with IFK Mariehamn.

== Personal life ==
Originally a construction worker, Gustafsson graduated from Åbo Akademi University with a degree in Economics in 2004.
