= Saku Puhakainen =

Finnish footballer (born 1975)

Personal information
- Date of birth: 14 January 1975 (age 51)
- Place of birth: Lappeenranta, Finland
- Height: 1.69 m (5 ft 7 in)
- Position: Forward

Senior career*
Years	Team	Apps	(Gls)
1992	Rakuunat	18	(2)
1993–1994	Kultsu	43	(17)
1995	Kuusysi	25	(8)
1996–1999	TPS	100	(30)
1997	→ Aarhus Fremad (loan)	3	(1)
2000–2009	MYPA	257	(75)
2010	Kultsu	9	(8)
Total		455	(141)

International career
1997	Finland	3	(2)
- * Club domestic league appearances and goals as of 18 May 2010

Saku Puhakainen (born 14 January 1975) is a Finnish former footballer who played as a striker.

== Club career ==
Since 2000 Puhakainen played for MyPa in the Finnish premier division, Veikkausliiga. His earlier clubs include FC Kuusysi and Turun Palloseura. He achieved the Veikkausliiga top scorer title in 2003. With MyPa he has won the Finnish Cup in 2004 and the Finnish championship in 2005. After being released from MYPA, he returned to Kultsu FC playing in third division. During his career, he made 382 appearances and scored 114 goals in Finnish top-tier Veikkausliiga.

== International career ==
Puhakainen played three times for Finland and scored twice under coach Richard Møller Nielsen in 1997.

== Career statistics ==
Appearances and goals by club, season and competition
Club	Season	League			Domestic cups (Note: Includes Suomen Cup and Finnish League Cup)		Europe		Total	
Club	Season	Division	Apps	Goals	Apps	Goals	Apps	Goals	Apps	Goals
Rakuunat	1992	Kakkonen	18	2	–		–		18	2
Kultsu	1993	Ykkönen	26	9	–		–		26	9
Kultsu	1994	Ykkönen	17	8	–		–		17	8
Kultsu	Total		43	17	0	0	0	0	43	17
Kuusysi	1995	Veikkausliiga	25	9	–		–		25	9
TPS	1996	Veikkausliiga	25	7	1	0	–		26	7
TPS	1997	Veikkausliiga	26	6	–		4 (Note: Appearances in UEFA Intertoto Cup)	0	30	6
TPS	1998	Veikkausliiga	24	5	–		4	2	28	7
TPS	1999	Veikkausliiga	25	12	–		–		25	12
TPS	Total		100	30	1	0	8	2	109	32
Aarhus Fremad (loan)	1997–98	Danish Superliga	3	1	–		–		3	1
MYPA	2000	Veikkausliiga	32	10	–		2	1	34	11
MYPA	2001	Veikkausliiga	31	9	–		2 (Note: Appearances in UEFA Cup)	1	33	10
MYPA	2002	Veikkausliiga	28	13	–		2	0	30	13
MYPA	2003	Veikkausliiga	26	14	–		4	0	30	14
MYPA	2004	Veikkausliiga	26	9	1	1	2	1	29	11
MYPA	2005	Veikkausliiga	20	8	0	0	2	0	22	8
MYPA	2006	Veikkausliiga	17	1	0	0	4 (Note: Appearances in UEFA Champions League)	2	21	3
MYPA	2007	Veikkausliiga	25	4	0	0	4	0	29	4
MYPA	2008	Veikkausliiga	26	5	–		–		26	5
MYPA	2009	Veikkausliiga	26	2	6	0	–		32	2
MYPA	Total		257	75	7	1	22	5	286	81
Kultsu	2010	Kolmonen	9	8	–		–		9	8
PEPO Lappeenranta	2011	Kakkonen	1	0	–		–		1	0
Career total			456	142	8	1	30	7	494	150

=== International ===
Finland
Year	Apps	Goals
1997	3	2
Total	3	2

=== International goals ===
As of match played 25 February 1997. Finland score listed first, score column indicates score after each Puhakainen goal.

List of international goals scored by Saku Puhakainen
No.	Date	Venue	Opponent	Score	Result	Competition
1	23 February 1997	Stadium Merdeka, Kuala Lumpur, Malaysia	China	1–1	1–2	Friendly
2	25 February 1997	Stadium Merdeka, Kuala Lumpur, Malaysia	Singapore	1–0	1–0	Friendly
