= 2003 Veikkausliiga =

Veikkausliiga
- Season: 2003
- Champions: HJK Helsinki
- Top goalscorer: Saku Puhakainen, MyPa (14)

The 2003 season was the 73rd completed season of Finnish Football League Championship, known as the Veikkausliiga. At the same time it was the 14th season of the Veikkausliiga.

== Overview ==
The Veikkausliiga is administered by the Finnish Football Association and the competition's 2003 season was contested by 14 teams. HJK Helsinki won the championship and qualified for the 2004–05 UEFA Champions League qualification round, while the second and sixth placed teams qualified for the first qualification round of the 2004–05 UEFA Cup. The third and fourth placed teams qualified for the UEFA Intertoto Cup 2004, while FC KooTeePee and KuPS Kuopio were relegated to the Ykkönen.

== Participating clubs ==
In 2003 there were 14 participants in the Veikkausliiga:

- Allianssi Vantaa
- FC Jazz Pori
- FC Hämeenlinna
- FC KooTeePee - Promoted from Ykkönen
- FC Lahti
- Haka Valkeakoski
- HJK Helsinki
- Inter Turku
- Jaro Pietarsaari
- FC Jokerit - Promoted from Ykkönen
- KuPS Kuopio
- MyPa 47 Anjalankoski
- Tampere United
- TPS Turku - Promoted from Ykkönen

== League standings ==
Location of teams in 2003 Veikkausliiga

Pos	Team	Pld	W	D	L	GF	GA	GD	Pts	Qualification or relegation
1	HJK Helsinki (C)	26	17	6	3	51	15	+36	57	Qualification to Champions League first qualifying round
2	Haka Valkeakoski	26	16	5	5	54	16	+38	53	Qualification to UEFA Cup first qualifying round
3	Tampere United	26	14	5	7	39	21	+18	47	Qualification to Intertoto Cup first round
4	MyPa Anjalankoski	26	13	4	9	46	29	+17	43	Qualification to Intertoto Cup first round
5	FC Lahti	26	11	8	7	40	31	+9	41	
6	Allianssi Vantaa	26	10	6	10	43	44	−1	36	Qualification to UEFA Cup first qualifying round (Note: Allianssi Vantaa as runners-up of the 2003 Finnish Cup qualified for the first qualifying round of the 2004–05 UEFA Cup.)
7	FC Inter Turku	26	10	5	11	43	41	+2	35	
8	Jaro Jakobstad	26	9	8	9	36	38	−2	35	
9	TPS Turku	26	8	8	10	30	35	−5	32	
10	FC Jokerit	26	7	7	12	29	37	−8	28	
11	FC Hämeenlinna	26	7	7	12	25	48	−23	28	
12	FC Jazz Pori	26	7	7	12	31	55	−24	28	
13	FC KooTeePee (R)	26	6	4	16	28	53	−25	22	Qualification to relegation play-offs
14	KuPS (R)	26	4	6	16	25	57	−32	18	Relegation to Ykkönen

(C) Champions; (R) Relegated

=== Promotion/relegation playoff ===
- RoPS Rovaniemi - KooTeePee Kotka 4-1
- KooTeePee Kotka - RoPS Rovaniemi 3-2

RoPS Rovaniemi promoted, KooTeePee Kotka relegated.

== Results ==
Home \ Away	ALL	HAK	HJK	HÄM	INT	JAR	JAZ	JOK	KTP	KUP	LAH	MYP	TAM	TPS
AC Allianssi		0–3	1–4	3–0	2–0	0–1	4–0	1–1	5–0	5–2	0–3	1–4	3–1	2–1
FC Haka	5–0		0–1	4–0	0–1	2–3	5–0	0–1	2–0	3–1	5–1	0–1	1–0	1–0
HJK Helsinki	2–2	0–0		3–0	2–1	0–0	3–0	1–1	5–0	3–0	2–0	1–0	2–0	1–1
Hämeenlinna	0–3	2–2	0–3		1–0	1–1	1–3	2–1	2–1	4–3	2–3	1–0	0–0	0–1
Inter Turku	5–2	2–4	1–2	4–1		1–1	2–0	3–2	2–1	1–2	1–1	1–0	1–3	0–2
Jaro	2–0	0–2	2–3	2–2	0–6		0–1	2–0	3–1	4–2	1–1	0–2	0–0	4–1
Jazz	1–1	1–1	2–6	2–0	1–2	1–1		0–3	3–2	2–2	1–1	2–2	1–1	2–1
Jokerit	0–0	0–0	0–1	2–2	4–0	1–1	3–1		1–1	1–2	2–0	2–4	0–1	2–0
KooTeePee	0–1	0–4	0–4	1–2	3–3	2–0	3–0	2–0		0–1	2–1	1–2	2–1	0–0
KuPS	0–0	0–3	0–2	0–2	0–3	1–5	0–2	2–1	1–3		1–1	2–2	1–3	0–0
Lahti	0–2	0–0	0–0	0–0	3–0	2–1	4–2	0–1	4–1	2–1		4–1	0–1	2–0
MyPa	3–1	2–3	2–0	0–0	2–2	3–0	4–0	3–0	2–0	1–0	1–2		0–1	1–2
Tampere United	4–2	0–2	1–0	4–0	1–0	0–1	2–0	5–0	0–0	4–1	1–3	2–0		2–0
TPS	2–2	0–2	1–0	2–0	1–1	3–1	1–3	3–0	4–2	0–0	2–2	1–4	1–1	

Legend: Blue = home team win; Yellow = draw; Red = away team win.

== Leading scorers ==
Pos.	Player	Nat.	Club	Goals
1.	Saku Puhakainen	(Finland)	MyPa	14
2.	Juho Mäkelä	(Finland)	HJK	13
-	Gábor Szilágyi	(Hungary)	FC KooTeePee	13
4.	Luciano Álvarez	(Argentina)	FC Inter	12
-	Arístides Pertot	(Argentina)	FC Inter	12
6.	Mika Kottila	(Finland)	HJK	11
-	Valeri Popovitch	(Russia)	FC Haka	11
8.	Ryan Botha	(South Africa)	MyPa	10
-	Jari Niemi	(Finland)	Tampere Utd	10
-	Sami Ristilä	(Finland)	FC Haka	10

== Attendances ==
No.	Club	Average	Highest
1	HJK	3,646	7,716
2	TPS	3,203	5,624
3	Tampere	3,062	5,040
4	Inter Turku	2,520	6,211
5	Lahti	2,403	6,450
6	KooTeePee	2,348	3,378
7	KuPS	2,242	3,015
8	Jokerit	2,231	3,789
9	Haka	2,067	3,121
10	MyPa	1,995	3,111
11	Jazz	1,898	3,248
12	Hämeenlinna	1,892	3,105
13	Jaro	1,709	2,627
14	Allianssi	1,701	2,402
