= 1998–99 UEFA Champions League =

European football tournament

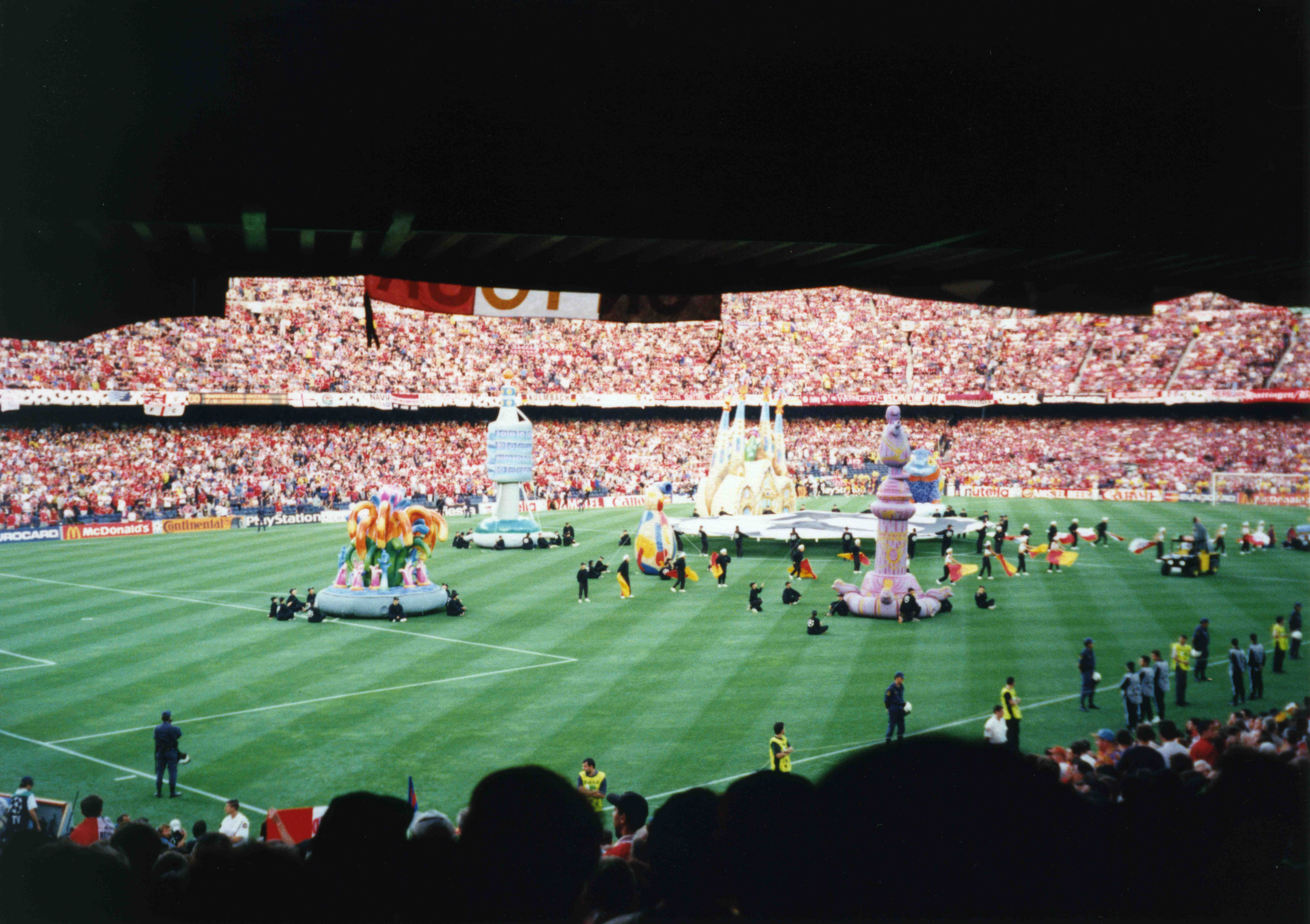
- The final was played at Camp Nou in Barcelona

Tournament details
- Dates: Qualifying: 22 July – 26 August 1998; Competition proper: 16 September 1998 – 26 May 1999
- Teams: Competition proper: 24; Total: 56

Final positions
- Champions: (England) Manchester United (2nd title)
- Runners-up: (Germany) Bayern Munich

Tournament statistics
- Matches played: 85
- Goals scored: 238 (2.8 per match)
- Attendance: 3,549,002 (41,753 per match)
- Top scorer(s): Andriy Shevchenko (Dynamo Kyiv); Dwight Yorke (Manchester United); 8 goals each

The 1998–99 UEFA Champions League was the 44th season of the UEFA Champions League, Europe's premier club football tournament, and the seventh since it was renamed from the "European Champion Clubs' Cup" or "European Cup". The competition was won by Manchester United, coming back from a goal down in the last two minutes of injury time to defeat Bayern Munich 2–1 in the final. Teddy Sheringham and Ole Gunnar Solskjær scored United's goals after Bayern had hit the post and the bar. They were the first English club to win Europe's premier club football tournament since 1984 and were also the first English club to reach a Champions League final since the Heysel Stadium disaster and the subsequent banning of English clubs from all UEFA competitions between 1985 and 1990. It was the first time since 1968 that Manchester United won the Champions League, giving them their second title.

Manchester United also completed the Treble, becoming the fourth side in Europe to do so and in the process prevented Bayern Munich from achieving the feat themselves; Bayern eventually finished runners-up in their domestic cup two weeks later.

Manchester United won the trophy without losing a single match, despite having competed in a group with Bayern Munich, Barcelona and Brøndby, plus two highly rated Italian clubs in the knock-out stages. However, United became champions with just five wins in total, the lowest number of wins recorded by a champion in the Champions League era to date, though the competition now has an extra round of two matches in the knock-out stages.

It was the first time the Champions League was won by a team that had neither won their domestic league nor the Champions League the previous season and therefore would not have qualified for the tournament under the old qualification rules (title holder or national league champion). For the second time, the runners-up of eight domestic leagues entered the competition.

Real Madrid were the defending champions, but were eliminated in the quarter-finals by Dynamo Kyiv.

== Association team allocation ==
Number of teams per country as well as the starting round for each club and seeding were based on UEFA association coefficients.

- Associations ranked 1–8 each have two participants
- Associations ranked 9–48 each have one participant (except Liechtenstein)

=== Association ranking ===
For the 1998–99 UEFA Champions League, the associations were allocated places according to their 1998 UEFA association coefficients, which took into account their performance in European competitions from 1993–94 to 1997–98.

Apart from the allocation based on the association coefficients, an association could have an additional team participating in the Champions League, as noted below:

- (TH) – Additional berth for UEFA Champions League title holders

Association ranking for 1998–99 UEFA Champions League

Rank	Association	Coeff.	Teams	Notes
1	Italy	59.640	2	
2	Germany	49.932	2	
3	Spain	48.580	2	+1 (TH)
4	France	41.433	2	
5	Netherlands	35.916	2	
6	England	35.566	2	
7	Portugal	31.266	2	
8	Greece	28.750	2	
9	Czech Republic	28.166	1	
10	Norway	27.449	1	
11	Austria	27.250	1	
12	Russia	26.866	1	
13	Croatia	26.166	1	
14	Turkey	25.650	1	
15	Denmark	24.200	1	
16	Switzerland	22.250	1	
17	Ukraine	22.082	1	

Rank	Association	Coeff.	Teams	Notes
18	Poland	22.000	1	
19	Hungary	21.083	1	
20	Belgium	21.000	1	
21	Slovakia	20.999	1	
22	Romania	20.750	1	
23	Sweden	20.600	1	
24	Georgia	20.333	1	
25	Cyprus	20.332	1	
26	Scotland	19.500	1	
27	Israel	16.749	1	
28	Slovenia	15.998	1	
29	Belarus	14.833	1	
30	Iceland	13.666	1	
31	Finland	13.415	1	
32	Latvia	11.498	1	
33	Bulgaria	10.499	1	
34	Macedonia	8.666	1	

Rank	Association	Coeff.	Teams	Notes
35	Lithuania	7.333	1	
36	FR Yugoslavia	7.083	1	
37	Moldova	6.666	1	
38	Liechtenstein	5.000	0	
39	Estonia	4.999	1	
40	Armenia	4.832	1	
41	Northern Ireland	4.665	1	
42	Malta	4.664	1	
43	Wales	3.999	1	
44	Republic of Ireland	3.998	1	
45	Faroe Islands	2.833	1	
46	Albania	2.666	1	
47	Luxembourg	2.333	1	
48	Azerbaijan	1.833	1	
49	Andorra	0.000	0	
50	Bosnia and Herzegovina	0.000	0	
51	San Marino	0.000	0	

=== Distribution ===
	Teams entering in this round	Teams advancing from previous round
First qualifying round (32 teams)	32 champions from associations 16–48 (except Liechtenstein)	
Second qualifying round (32 teams)	8 champions from associations 8–15; 8 runners-up from associations 1–8	16 winners from the first qualifying round
Group stage (24 teams)	Champions League title holders (Real Madrid); 7 champions from associations 1–7	16 winners from the second qualifying round
Knockout phase (8 teams)		6 group winners from the group stage; 2 best-ranked group runners-up from the group stage

=== Teams ===
Group stage
(Spain) Real Madrid (TH)	(Germany) 1. FC Kaiserslautern (1st)	(France) Lens (1st)	(England) Arsenal (1st)
(Italy) Juventus (1st)	(Spain) Barcelona (1st)	(Netherlands) Ajax (1st)	(Portugal) Porto (1st)
Second qualifying round
(Italy) Internazionale (2nd)	(Netherlands) PSV Eindhoven (2nd)	(Greece) Panathinaikos (2nd)	(Russia) Spartak Moscow (1st)
(Germany) Bayern Munich (2nd)	(England) Manchester United (2nd)	(Czech Republic) Sparta Prague (1st)	Croatia Zagreb (1st)
(Spain) Athletic Bilbao (2nd)	(Portugal) Benfica (2nd)	(Norway) Rosenborg (1st)	(Turkey) Galatasaray (1st)
(France) Metz (2nd)	(Greece) Olympiacos (1st)	(Austria) Sturm Graz (1st)	(Denmark) Brøndby (1st)
First qualifying round
(Switzerland) Grasshopper (1st)	(Georgia (country)) Dinamo Tbilisi (1st)	(Latvia) Skonto (1st)	(Northern Ireland) Cliftonville (1st)
(Ukraine) Dynamo Kyiv (1st)	(Cyprus) Anorthosis Famagusta (1st)	(Bulgaria) Litex Lovech (1st)	(Malta) Valletta (1st)
(Poland) ŁKS Łódź (1st)	(Scotland) Celtic (1st)	(North Macedonia) Sileks (1st)	(Wales) Barry Town (1st)
(Hungary) Újpest (1st)	(Israel) Beitar Jerusalem (1st)	(Lithuania) Kareda (1st)	(Republic of Ireland) St Patrick's Athletic (1st)
(Belgium) Club Brugge (1st)	(Slovenia) Maribor (1st)	(Federal Republic of Yugoslavia) Obilić (1st)	(Faroe Islands) B36 (1st)
(Slovakia) Košice (1st)	(Belarus) Dinamo Minsk (1st)	(Moldova) Zimbru Chișinău (1st)	(Albania) Vllaznia (1st)
(Romania) Steaua București (1st)	(Iceland) ÍBV (1st)	(Estonia) Flora (1st)	(Luxembourg) Jeunesse Esch (1st)
(Sweden) Halmstads BK (1st)	(Finland) HJK (1st)	(Armenia) Yerevan (1st)	(Azerbaijan) Kapaz (1st)

== Round and draw dates ==
The schedule of the competition was as follows (all draws were held in Geneva, Switzerland, unless stated otherwise).

Phase	Round	Draw date	First leg	Second leg
Qualifying	First qualifying round	6 July 1998	22 July 1998	29 July 1998
Qualifying	Second qualifying round	6 July 1998	12 August 1998	26 August 1998
Group stage	Matchday 1	27 August 1998 (Monaco)	16 September 1998	
Group stage	Matchday 2	27 August 1998 (Monaco)	30 September 1998	
Group stage	Matchday 3	27 August 1998 (Monaco)	21 October 1998	
Group stage	Matchday 4	27 August 1998 (Monaco)	4 November 1998	
Group stage	Matchday 5	27 August 1998 (Monaco)	25 November 1998	
Group stage	Matchday 6	27 August 1998 (Monaco)	9 December 1998	
Knockout phase	Quarter-finals	16 December 1998	3 March 1999	17 March 1999
Knockout phase	Semi-finals	19 March 1999	7 April 1999	21 April 1999
Knockout phase	Final	19 March 1999	26 May 1999 at Camp Nou, Barcelona	

== Qualifying rounds ==
=== First qualifying round ===
Team 1	Agg.	Team 2	1st leg	2nd leg
Sileks (North Macedonia)	1–2	(Belgium) Club Brugge	0–0	1–2
ŁKS Łódź (Poland)	7–2	(Azerbaijan) Kapaz	4–1	3–1
Litex Lovech (Bulgaria)	3–2	(Sweden) Halmstads BK	2–0	1–2
Grasshopper (Switzerland)	8–0	(Luxembourg) Jeunesse Esch	6–0	2–0
Celtic (Scotland)	2–0	(Republic of Ireland) St Patrick's Athletic	0–0	2–0
Kareda (Lithuania)	0–4	(Slovenia) Maribor	0–3	0–1
Dynamo Kyiv (Ukraine)	10–1	(Wales) Barry Town	8–0	2–1
Cliftonville (Northern Ireland)	1–13	(Slovakia) Košice	1–5	0–8
Skonto (Latvia)	2–1	(Belarus) Dinamo Minsk	0–0	2–1
Valletta (Malta)	0–8	(Cyprus) Anorthosis Famagusta	0–2	0–6
Beitar Jerusalem (Israel)	5–1	(Faroe Islands) B36	4–1	1–0
Dinamo Tbilisi (Georgia (country))	4–3	(Albania) Vllaznia	3–0 (Note: Awarded)	1–3
HJK (Finland)	5–0	(Armenia) Yerevan	2–0	3–0
Obilić (Federal Republic of Yugoslavia)	4–1	(Iceland) ÍBV	2–0	2–1
Zimbru Chișinău (Moldova)	2–3	(Hungary) Újpest	1–0	1–3
Steaua București (Romania)	5–4	(Estonia) Flora	4–1	1–3

=== Second qualifying round ===
The losing teams qualified for the first round of the 1998–99 UEFA Cup. The winning teams of the first qualifying round were drawn against teams qualified directly for the second qualifying round.

Team 1	Agg.	Team 2	1st leg	2nd leg
Rosenborg (Norway)	4–4 (a)	(Belgium) Club Brugge	2–0	2–4
Manchester United (England)	2–0	(Poland) ŁKS Łódź	2–0	0–0
Litex Lovech (Bulgaria)	2–11	(Russia) Spartak Moscow	0–5	2–6
Galatasaray (Turkey)	5–3	(Switzerland) Grasshopper	2–1	3–2
Celtic (Scotland)	1–3	Croatia Zagreb	1–0	0–3
Maribor (Slovenia)	3–5	(Netherlands) PSV Eindhoven	2–1	1–4 (a.e.t.)
Dynamo Kyiv (Ukraine)	1–1 (3–1 p)	(Czech Republic) Sparta Prague	0–1	1–0 (a.e.t.)
Košice (Slovakia)	1–2	(Denmark) Brøndby	0–2	1–0
Internazionale (Italy)	7–1	(Latvia) Skonto	4–0	3–1
Olympiacos (Greece)	6–3	(Cyprus) Anorthosis Famagusta	2–1	4–2
Benfica (Portugal)	8–4	(Israel) Beitar Jerusalem	6–0	2–4
Dinamo Tbilisi (Georgia (country))	2–2 (a)	(Spain) Athletic Bilbao	2–1	0–1
HJK (Finland)	2–1	(France) Metz	1–0	1–1
Bayern Munich (Germany)	5–1	(Federal Republic of Yugoslavia) Obilić	4–0	1–1
Sturm Graz (Austria)	7–2	(Hungary) Újpest	4–0	3–2
Steaua București (Romania)	5–8	(Greece) Panathinaikos	2–2	3–6

== Group stage ==
Location of teams of the 1998–99 UEFA Champions League group stage.
Brown: Group A; Red: Group B; Orange: Group C; Yellow: Group D; Green: Group E; Blue: Group F.

Twenty-four teams took part in the group stage: the national champions of Italy, Germany, Spain, France, Netherlands, England and Portugal, the title holders, and the 16 winning teams from the second qualifying round. Arsenal, Athletic Bilbao, Brøndby, Croatia Zagreb, HJK, Internazionale, 1. FC Kaiserslautern, Lens and Sturm Graz made their debuts in the group stage of the competition. This was the first time that a team from Finland played in the group stage.

The teams were divided into six groups of four teams each, with the teams in each group playing each other twice (home and away) in a double round-robin format. Three points were awarded for each win, with one point each for a draw and none for a defeat. The winners of each group progressed to the quarter-finals, along with the two best second-placed teams. In the event that two or more teams had the same number of points at the end of the group stage, the rankings of the teams in question were determined by the following criteria:

1. greater number of points obtained in the matches between the teams in question
2. goal difference resulting from the matches between the teams in question
3. greater number of goals scored away from home in matches between the teams in question
4. superior goal difference from all the matches played
5. greater number of goals scored
6. national association's coefficient at the start of the season in question

The two best runners-up were determined by the following criteria:

1. highest number of points obtained in the group matches
2. goal difference from all group matches
3. greater number of goals scored in all group matches
4. greater number of goals scored away from home
5. national association's coefficient at the start of the season in question
6. individual club coefficient at the start of the season in question

=== Group A ===
Pos	Team	Pld	W	D	L	GF	GA	GD	Pts	Qualification	OLY	CZG	POR	AJX
1	(Greece) Olympiacos	6	3	2	1	8	6	+2	11	Advance to knockout stage	—	2–0	2–1	1–0
2	Croatia Zagreb	6	2	2	2	5	7	−2	8		1–1	—	3–1	0–0
3	(Portugal) Porto	6	2	1	3	11	9	+2	7		2–2	3–0	—	3–0
4	(Netherlands) Ajax	6	2	1	3	4	6	−2	7		2–0	0–1	2–1	—

Source: UEFA

=== Group B ===
Pos	Team	Pld	W	D	L	GF	GA	GD	Pts	Qualification	JUV	GAL	ROS	ATH
1	(Italy) Juventus	6	1	5	0	7	5	+2	8	Advance to knockout stage	—	2–2	2–0	1–1
2	(Turkey) Galatasaray	6	2	2	2	8	8	0	8		1–1	—	3–0	2–1
3	(Norway) Rosenborg	6	2	2	2	7	8	−1	8		1–1	3–0	—	2–1
4	(Spain) Athletic Bilbao	6	1	3	2	5	6	−1	6		0–0	1–0	1–1	—

Source: UEFA

=== Group C ===
Pos	Team	Pld	W	D	L	GF	GA	GD	Pts	Qualification	INT	RMA	SPM	STM
1	(Italy) Internazionale	6	4	1	1	9	5	+4	13	Advance to knockout stage	—	3–1	2–1	1–0
2	(Spain) Real Madrid	6	4	0	2	17	8	+9	12	Advance to knockout stage	2–0	—	2–1	6–1
3	(Russia) Spartak Moscow	6	2	2	2	7	6	+1	8		1–1	2–1	—	0–0
4	(Austria) Sturm Graz	6	0	1	5	2	16	−14	1		0–2	1–5	0–2	—

Source: UEFA

=== Group D ===
Pos	Team	Pld	W	D	L	GF	GA	GD	Pts	Qualification	BAY	MUN	BAR	BRO
1	(Germany) Bayern Munich	6	3	2	1	9	6	+3	11	Advance to knockout stage	—	2–2	1–0	2–0
2	(England) Manchester United	6	2	4	0	20	11	+9	10	Advance to knockout stage	1–1	—	3–3	5–0
3	(Spain) Barcelona	6	2	2	2	11	9	+2	8		1–2	3–3	—	2–0
4	(Denmark) Brøndby	6	1	0	5	4	18	−14	3		2–1	2–6	0–2	—

Source: UEFA

=== Group E ===
Pos	Team	Pld	W	D	L	GF	GA	GD	Pts	Qualification	DKV	LEN	ARS	PAN
1	(Ukraine) Dynamo Kyiv	6	3	2	1	11	7	+4	11	Advance to knockout stage	—	1–1	3–1	2–1
2	(France) Lens	6	2	2	2	5	6	−1	8		1–3	—	1–1	1–0
3	(England) Arsenal	6	2	2	2	8	8	0	8		1–1	0–1	—	2–1
4	(Greece) Panathinaikos	6	2	0	4	6	9	−3	6		2–1	1–0	1–3	—

Source: UEFA

=== Group F ===
Pos	Team	Pld	W	D	L	GF	GA	GD	Pts	Qualification	KAI	BEN	PSV	HJK
1	(Germany) 1. FC Kaiserslautern	6	4	1	1	12	6	+6	13	Advance to knockout stage	—	1–0	3–1	5–2
2	(Portugal) Benfica	6	2	2	2	8	9	−1	8		2–1	—	2–1	2–2
3	(Netherlands) PSV Eindhoven	6	2	1	3	10	11	−1	7		1–2	2–2	—	2–1
4	(Finland) HJK	6	1	2	3	8	12	−4	5		0–0	2–0	1–3	—

Source: UEFA

=== Ranking of second-placed teams ===
Pos	Grp	Team	Pld	W	D	L	GF	GA	GD	Pts	Qualification
1	C	(Spain) Real Madrid	6	4	0	2	17	8	+9	12	Advance to knockout stage
2	D	(England) Manchester United	6	2	4	0	20	11	+9	10	Advance to knockout stage
3	B	(Turkey) Galatasaray	6	2	2	2	8	8	0	8	
4	F	(Portugal) Benfica	6	2	2	2	8	9	−1	8	
5	E	(France) Lens	6	2	2	2	5	6	−1	8	
6	A	Croatia Zagreb	6	2	2	2	5	7	−2	8	

Source: RSSSF
Rules for classification: 1) Points; 2) Goal difference; 3) Goals scored; 4) Away goals scored; 5) Association coefficient; 6) Club coefficient.

== Knockout stage ==
The knockout stage was played in a single-elimination tournament format consisting of three rounds: quarter-finals, semi-finals and final. Each tie in the quarter-finals and semi-finals was played over two legs, with each team playing one leg at home, while the final was played as a single match at a neutral venue. In the quarter-finals and semi-finals, in the event that two teams scored the same number of goals over the two legs of their tie, the winner would be determined by the number of goals scored away from home. If both sides scored the same number of goals away from home, two 15-minute periods of extra time would be played. If both teams scored the same number of goals during extra time, the visiting team would qualify for the next round by having scored more goals away from home. If neither side scored during extra time, the match would be decided by a penalty shoot-out. In the final, if the scores were level after 90 minutes, two 15-minute periods of golden goal extra time would be played; i.e. whichever team scored first would be declared the winner. If neither side scored during golden goal extra time, a penalty shoot-out would again be used to determine the winner.

In the quarter-finals, the two best runners-up cannot be drawn together, nor could the winners and runners-up from the same group. Both runners-up played the first leg of their quarter-final at home, as did the other two teams drawn first in the other two quarter-finals.

=== Bracket ===
Quarter-finals
(England) Manchester United	2	1	3
(Italy) Internazionale	0	1	1
(Italy) Juventus	2	1	3
(Greece) Olympiacos	1	1	2
(Spain) Real Madrid	1	0	1
(Ukraine) Dynamo Kyiv	1	2	3
(Germany) Bayern Munich	2	4	6
(Germany) 1. FC Kaiserslautern	0	0	0

Semi-finals
(England) Manchester United	1	3	4
(Italy) Juventus	1	2	3
(Ukraine) Dynamo Kyiv	3	0	3
(Germany) Bayern Munich	3	1	4

Final
26 May – Barcelona
(England) Manchester United	2
(Germany) Bayern Munich	1

=== Quarter-finals ===
Team 1	Agg.	Team 2	1st leg	2nd leg
Real Madrid (Spain)	1–3	(Ukraine) Dynamo Kyiv	1–1	0–2
Manchester United (England)	3–1	(Italy) Internazionale	2–0	1–1
Juventus (Italy)	3–2	(Greece) Olympiacos	2–1	1–1
Bayern Munich (Germany)	6–0	(Germany) 1. FC Kaiserslautern	2–0	4–0

=== Semi-finals ===
Team 1	Agg.	Team 2	1st leg	2nd leg
Manchester United (England)	4–3	(Italy) Juventus	1–1	3–2
Dynamo Kyiv (Ukraine)	3–4	(Germany) Bayern Munich	3–3	0–1

=== Final ===
The final was played on 26 May 1999 at the Camp Nou in Barcelona, Spain.

26 May 1999
20:45 UTC+2

Manchester United (England)	2–1	(Germany) Bayern Munich
Sheringham 90+1'; Solskjær 90+3'	Report	Basler 6'

Camp Nou, Barcelona
Attendance: 90,245
Referee: Pierluigi Collina (Italy)

== Top goalscorers ==
The top scorers from the 1998–99 UEFA Champions League (excluding qualifying rounds) are as follows:

Rank	Name	Team	Goals
1	(Ukraine) Andriy Shevchenko	(Ukraine) Dynamo Kyiv	8
1	(Trinidad and Tobago) Dwight Yorke	(England) Manchester United	8
3	(Slovenia) Zlatko Zahovič	(Portugal) Porto	7
4	(Italy) Filippo Inzaghi	(Italy) Juventus	6
5	(Netherlands) Ruud van Nistelrooy	(Netherlands) PSV Eindhoven	5
5	(Portugal) Nuno Gomes	(Portugal) Benfica	5
7	(Brazil) Sonny Anderson	(Spain) Barcelona	4
7	(Germany) Mario Basler	(Germany) Bayern Munich	4
7	(England) Andy Cole	(England) Manchester United	4
7	(Germany) Stefan Effenberg	(Germany) Bayern Munich	4
7	(Wales) Ryan Giggs	(England) Manchester United	4
7	(Cyprus) Siniša Gogić	(Greece) Olympiacos	4
7	(Ukraine) Serhiy Rebrov	(Ukraine) Dynamo Kyiv	4
7	(Germany) Jürgen Rische	(Germany) 1. FC Kaiserslautern	4
7	(England) Paul Scholes	(England) Manchester United	4

== See also ==
- 1998–99 UEFA Cup
- 1998–99 UEFA Cup Winners' Cup
- 1998 UEFA Intertoto Cup
