= 1998–99 UEFA Champions League group stage =

International football competition

The group stage of the 1998–99 UEFA Champions League began on 16 September 1998 and ended on 9 December 1998. Eight teams qualified automatically for the group stage, while 16 more qualified via a preliminary round. The 24 teams were divided into six groups of four, and the teams in each group played against each other on a home-and-away basis, meaning that each team played a total of six group matches. For each win, teams were awarded three points, with one point awarded for each draw.

== Seeding ==
Seeding was based on the UEFA associations 1998 ranking, similarly to the previous season. Title holders and champions of nations ranked 1–5 were put in the Pot 1. Champions of nations ranked 6–7 as well as runners-up of nations ranked 1–5 (except France) formed Pot 2. The remaining qualified runners-up (from the nations 6–8) and champions of top three nations ranked below 7 formed Pot 3. Finally, the remaining six national champions formed Pot 4.

Key to colours in group tables
Group winners and best-ranked runners-up advance to the knockout stage

Pot 1
| Assoc. | Team |
|---|---|
| TH | (Spain) Real Madrid |
| 1 | (Italy) Juventus |
| 2 | (Germany) 1. FC Kaiserslautern |
| 3 | (Spain) Barcelona |
| 4 | (France) Lens |
| 5 | (Netherlands) Ajax |

Pot 2
| Assoc. | Team |
|---|---|
| 6 | (England) Arsenal |
| 7 | (Portugal) Porto |
| 1 | (Italy) Internazionale |
| 2 | (Germany) Bayern Munich |
| 3 | (Spain) Athletic Bilbao |
| 5 | (Netherlands) PSV Eindhoven |

Pot 3
| Assoc. | Team |
|---|---|
| 6 | (England) Manchester United |
| 7 | (Portugal) Benfica |
| 8 | (Greece) Olympiacos |
| 8 | (Greece) Panathinaikos |
| 10 | (Norway) Rosenborg |
| 11 | (Austria) Sturm Graz |

Pot 4
| Assoc. | Team |
|---|---|
| 12 | (Russia) Spartak Moscow |
| 13 | Croatia Zagreb |
| 14 | (Turkey) Galatasaray |
| 15 | (Denmark) Brøndby |
| 17 | (Ukraine) Dynamo Kyiv |
| 31 | (Finland) HJK |

== Groups ==
Times are CET/CEST, (Note: CET (UTC+1) for matches from 4 November 1998, and CEST (UTC+2) for matches to 21 October 1998.) as listed by UEFA (local times, if different, are in parentheses)

=== Group A ===
| Pos | Team | Pld | W | D | L | GF | GA | GD | Pts | Qualification | OLY | CZG | POR | AJX |
|---|---|---|---|---|---|---|---|---|---|---|---|---|---|---|
| 1 | (Greece) Olympiacos | 6 | 3 | 2 | 1 | 8 | 6 | +2 | 11 | Advance to knockout stage | — | 2–0 | 2–1 | 1–0 |
| 2 | Croatia Zagreb | 6 | 2 | 2 | 2 | 5 | 7 | −2 | 8 | | 1–1 | — | 3–1 | 0–0 |
| 3 | (Portugal) Porto | 6 | 2 | 1 | 3 | 11 | 9 | +2 | 7 | | 2–2 | 3–0 | — | 3–0 |
| 4 | (Netherlands) Ajax | 6 | 2 | 1 | 3 | 4 | 6 | −2 | 7 | | 2–0 | 0–1 | 2–1 | — |

Source: UEFA
16 September 1998
20:45 (19:45 UTC+1)

| Porto (Portugal) | 2–2 | (Greece) Olympiacos |
|---|---|---|
| Zahovič 65'; Jardel 82' | Report | Giannakopoulos 86'; Gogić 89' |

Estádio das Antas, Porto
Attendance: 26,000
Referee: Gilles Veissière (France)
16 September 1998
20:45

| Croatia Zagreb | 0–0 | (Netherlands) Ajax |
|---|---|---|
| | Report |

Stadion Maksimir, Zagreb
Attendance: 27,600
Referee: Kim Milton Nielsen (Denmark)

30 September 1998
20:45

| Ajax (Netherlands) | 2–1 | (Portugal) Porto |
|---|---|---|
| Rudy 57'; Litmanen 86' (pen.) | Report | Zahovič 69' |

Amsterdam Arena, Amsterdam
Attendance: 41,000
Referee: Piero Ceccarini (Italy)
30 September 1998
20:45 (21:45 UTC+3)

| Olympiacos (Greece) | 2–0 | Croatia Zagreb |
|---|---|---|
| Alexandris 21'; Gogić 80' | Report |

Olympic Stadium, Athens
Attendance: 60,502
Referee: David Elleray (England)

21 October 1998
20:45 (21:45 UTC+3)

| Olympiacos (Greece) | 1–0 | (Netherlands) Ajax |
|---|---|---|
| Alexandris 38' | Report |

Olympic Stadium, Athens
Attendance: 73,208
Referee: Manuel Díaz Vega (Spain)
21 October 1998
20:45 (19:45 UTC+1)

| Porto (Portugal) | 3–0 | Croatia Zagreb |
|---|---|---|
| Doriva 33'; Zahovič 42', 75' | Report |

Estádio das Antas, Porto
Attendance: 16,500
Referee: Günter Benkö (Austria)

4 November 1998
20:45

| Ajax (Netherlands) | 2–0 | (Greece) Olympiacos |
|---|---|---|
| Witschge 36'; Gorré 88' | Report |

Amsterdam Arena, Amsterdam
Attendance: 46,000
Referee: Stefano Braschi (Italy)
4 November 1998
20:45

| Croatia Zagreb | 3–1 | (Portugal) Porto |
|---|---|---|
| Mikić 7'; Rukavina 37'; Mujčin 61' | Report | Jardel 39' |

Stadion Maksimir, Zagreb
Attendance: 5,000
Referee: Markus Merk (Germany)

25 November 1998
20:45

| Ajax (Netherlands) | 0–1 | Croatia Zagreb |
|---|---|---|
| | Report | Šimić 67' |

Amsterdam Arena, Amsterdam
Attendance: 47,000
Referee: Marc Batta (France)
25 November 1998
20:45 (21:45 UTC+2)

| Olympiacos (Greece) | 2–1 | (Portugal) Porto |
|---|---|---|
| Gogić 18'; Đorđević 55' | Report | Zahovič 76' |

Olympic Stadium, Athens
Attendance: 70,232
Referee: Hugh Dallas (Scotland)

9 December 1998
20:45 (19:45 UTC+0)

| Porto (Portugal) | 3–0 | (Netherlands) Ajax |
|---|---|---|
| Zahovič 54', 73'; Drulović 79' | Report |

Estádio das Antas, Porto
Attendance: 15,000
Referee: Pierluigi Collina (Italy)
9 December 1998
20:45

| Croatia Zagreb | 1–1 | (Greece) Olympiacos |
|---|---|---|
| Jeličić 35' | Report | Giannakopoulos 64' |

Stadion Maksimir, Zagreb
Attendance: 16,546
Referee: Rune Pedersen (Norway)

=== Group B ===
| Pos | Team | Pld | W | D | L | GF | GA | GD | Pts | Qualification | JUV | GAL | ROS | ATH |
|---|---|---|---|---|---|---|---|---|---|---|---|---|---|---|
| 1 | (Italy) Juventus | 6 | 1 | 5 | 0 | 7 | 5 | +2 | 8 | Advance to knockout stage | — | 2–2 | 2–0 | 1–1 |
| 2 | (Turkey) Galatasaray | 6 | 2 | 2 | 2 | 8 | 8 | 0 | 8 | | 1–1 | — | 3–0 | 2–1 |
| 3 | (Norway) Rosenborg | 6 | 2 | 2 | 2 | 7 | 8 | −1 | 8 | | 1–1 | 3–0 | — | 2–1 |
| 4 | (Spain) Athletic Bilbao | 6 | 1 | 3 | 2 | 5 | 6 | −1 | 6 | | 0–0 | 1–0 | 1–1 | — |

Source: UEFA
16 September 1998
20:45

| Juventus (Italy) | 2–2 | (Turkey) Galatasaray |
|---|---|---|
| Inzaghi 17'; Birindelli 69' | Report | Şükür 44'; Ümit 63' |

Stadio delle Alpi, Turin
Attendance: 37,192
Referee: Markus Merk (Germany)
16 September 1998
20:45

| Athletic Bilbao (Spain) | 1–1 | (Norway) Rosenborg |
|---|---|---|
| Etxeberria 7' | Report | Strand 64' |

San Mamés Stadium, Bilbao
Attendance: 33,500
Referee: Vasyl Melnychuk (Ukraine)

30 September 1998
20:45

| Rosenborg (Norway) | 1–1 | (Italy) Juventus |
|---|---|---|
| Skammelsrud 69' (pen.) | Report | Inzaghi 26' |

Lerkendal Stadion, Trondheim
Attendance: 15,385
Referee: Amand Ancion (Belgium)
30 September 1998
20:45 (21:45 UTC+3)

| Galatasaray (Turkey) | 2–1 | (Spain) Athletic Bilbao |
|---|---|---|
| Okan 16'; Hagi 90+3' | Report | Urzaiz 17' |

Ali Sami Yen Stadium, Istanbul
Attendance: 19,828
Referee: Graham Poll (England)

21 October 1998
20:45

| Rosenborg (Norway) | 3–0 | (Turkey) Galatasaray |
|---|---|---|
| Rushfeldt 69', 86', 89' | Report |

Lerkendal Stadion, Trondheim
Attendance: 15,372
Referee: Nikolai Levnikov (Russia)
21 October 1998
20:45

| Athletic Bilbao (Spain) | 0–0 | (Italy) Juventus |
|---|---|---|
| | Report |

San Mamés Stadium, Bilbao
Attendance: 39,000
Referee: Kim Milton Nielsen (Denmark)

4 November 1998
20:45

| Juventus (Italy) | 1–1 | (Spain) Athletic Bilbao |
|---|---|---|
| Lasa 68' (o.g.) | Report | Guerrero 45' |

Stadio delle Alpi, Turin
Attendance: 44,584
Referee: Hugh Dallas (Scotland)
4 November 1998
20:45 (21:45 UTC+2)

| Galatasaray (Turkey) | 3–0 | (Norway) Rosenborg |
|---|---|---|
| Şükür 55', 74'; Arif 66' | Report |

Ali Sami Yen Stadium, Istanbul
Attendance: 21,856
Referee: Hellmut Krug (Germany)

25 November 1998
20:45

| Rosenborg (Norway) | 2–1 | (Spain) Athletic Bilbao |
|---|---|---|
| Sørensen 2', 50' | Report | Pérez 90' |

Lerkendal Stadion, Trondheim
Attendance: 15,454
Referee: Bernd Heynemann (Germany)
2 December 1998 (Note: Originally scheduled for 25 November, delayed for political tensions between Turkey and Italy due to the Öcalan affair.)
20:45 (21:45 UTC+2)

| Galatasaray (Turkey) | 1–1 | (Italy) Juventus |
|---|---|---|
| Suat 90' | Report | Amoruso 78' |

Ali Sami Yen Stadium, Istanbul
Attendance: 22,920
Referee: Gilles Veissière (France)

9 December 1998
20:45

| Juventus (Italy) | 2–0 | (Norway) Rosenborg |
|---|---|---|
| Inzaghi 16'; Amoruso 36' | Report |

Stadio delle Alpi, Turin
Attendance: 7,174
Referee: Mario van der Ende (Netherlands)
9 December 1998
20:45

| Athletic Bilbao (Spain) | 1–0 | (Turkey) Galatasaray |
|---|---|---|
| Guerrero 44' | Report |

San Mamés Stadium, Bilbao
Attendance: 16,000
Referee: Urs Meier (Switzerland)

=== Group C ===
| Pos | Team | Pld | W | D | L | GF | GA | GD | Pts | Qualification | INT | RMA | SPM | STM |
|---|---|---|---|---|---|---|---|---|---|---|---|---|---|---|
| 1 | (Italy) Internazionale | 6 | 4 | 1 | 1 | 9 | 5 | +4 | 13 | Advance to knockout stage | — | 3–1 | 2–1 | 1–0 |
| 2 | (Spain) Real Madrid | 6 | 4 | 0 | 2 | 17 | 8 | +9 | 12 | Advance to knockout stage | 2–0 | — | 2–1 | 6–1 |
| 3 | (Russia) Spartak Moscow | 6 | 2 | 2 | 2 | 7 | 6 | +1 | 8 | | 1–1 | 2–1 | — | 0–0 |
| 4 | (Austria) Sturm Graz | 6 | 0 | 1 | 5 | 2 | 16 | −14 | 1 | | 0–2 | 1–5 | 0–2 | — |

Source: UEFA
16 September 1998
20:45

| Real Madrid (Spain) | 2–0 | (Italy) Internazionale |
|---|---|---|
| Hierro 80' (pen.); Seedorf 90' | Report |

Ramón Sánchez Pizjuán, Seville (Note: Real Madrid were ordered to play one match away from their usual home ground due to crowd trouble at their last home game in UEFA competition against Borussia Dortmund in the first leg of the 1997–98 Champions League semi-final.)
Attendance: 42,000
Referee: Hugh Dallas (Scotland)
16 September 1998
20:45

| Sturm Graz (Austria) | 0–2 | (Russia) Spartak Moscow |
|---|---|---|
| | Report | Titov 60'; Tsymbalar 63' |

Arnold Schwarzenegger-Stadion, Graz
Attendance: 11,000
Referee: Atanas Uzunov (Bulgaria)

30 September 1998
20:45

| Internazionale (Italy) | 1–0 | (Austria) Sturm Graz |
|---|---|---|
| Djorkaeff 90' | Report |

San Siro, Milan
Attendance: 24,791
Referee: Rune Pedersen (Norway)
30 September 1998
17:45 (19:45 UTC+4)

| Spartak Moscow (Russia) | 2–1 | (Spain) Real Madrid |
|---|---|---|
| Tsymbalar 72'; Titov 78' | Report | Raúl 63' |

Luzhniki Stadium, Moscow
Attendance: 60,000
Referee: Bernd Heynemann (Germany)

21 October 1998
20:45

| Real Madrid (Spain) | 6–1 | (Austria) Sturm Graz |
|---|---|---|
| Sávio 13', 90'; Raúl 22'; Jarni 61', 79'; Popović 67' (o.g.) | Report | Vastić 8' |

Santiago Bernabéu, Madrid
Attendance: 21,600
Referee: Graham Barber (England)
21 October 1998
20:45

| Internazionale (Italy) | 2–1 | (Russia) Spartak Moscow |
|---|---|---|
| Ventola 32'; Ronaldo 59' | Report | Tsymbalar 64' |

San Siro, Milan
Attendance: 44,199
Referee: Marc Batta (France)

4 November 1998
17:45 (19:45 UTC+3)

| Spartak Moscow (Russia) | 1–1 | (Italy) Internazionale |
|---|---|---|
| Tikhonov 67' | Report | Simeone 88' |

Luzhniki Stadium, Moscow
Attendance: 75,500
Referee: Urs Meier (Switzerland)
5 November 1998
20:00

| Sturm Graz (Austria) | 1–5 | (Spain) Real Madrid |
|---|---|---|
| Haas 3' | Report | Panucci 8', 61'; Mijatović 35'; Seedorf 57'; Šuker 74' |

Arnold Schwarzenegger-Stadion, Graz
Attendance: 13,851
Referee: Karl-Erik Nilsson (Sweden)

25 November 1998
20:45

| Internazionale (Italy) | 3–1 | (Spain) Real Madrid |
|---|---|---|
| Zamorano 51'; Baggio 86', 90' | Report | Seedorf 57' |

San Siro, Milan
Attendance: 77,829
Referee: Markus Merk (Germany)
25 November 1998
17:45 (19:45 UTC+3)

| Spartak Moscow (Russia) | 0–0 | (Austria) Sturm Graz |
|---|---|---|
| | Report |

Luzhniki Stadium, Moscow
Attendance: 38,000
Referee: Michel Piraux (Belgium)

9 December 1998
20:45

| Real Madrid (Spain) | 2–1 | (Russia) Spartak Moscow |
|---|---|---|
| Raúl 34'; Sávio 66' | Report | Khlestov 89' |

Santiago Bernabéu, Madrid
Attendance: 60,000
Referee: László Vagner (Hungary)
9 December 1998
20:45

| Sturm Graz (Austria) | 0–2 | (Italy) Internazionale |
|---|---|---|
| | Report | Zanetti 64'; Baggio 80' |

Arnold Schwarzenegger-Stadion, Graz
Attendance: 12,685
Referee: Jacek Granat (Poland)

=== Group D ===
| Pos | Team | Pld | W | D | L | GF | GA | GD | Pts | Qualification | BAY | MUN | BAR | BRO |
|---|---|---|---|---|---|---|---|---|---|---|---|---|---|---|
| 1 | (Germany) Bayern Munich | 6 | 3 | 2 | 1 | 9 | 6 | +3 | 11 | Advance to knockout stage | — | 2–2 | 1–0 | 2–0 |
| 2 | (England) Manchester United | 6 | 2 | 4 | 0 | 20 | 11 | +9 | 10 | Advance to knockout stage | 1–1 | — | 3–3 | 5–0 |
| 3 | (Spain) Barcelona | 6 | 2 | 2 | 2 | 11 | 9 | +2 | 8 | | 1–2 | 3–3 | — | 2–0 |
| 4 | (Denmark) Brøndby | 6 | 1 | 0 | 5 | 4 | 18 | −14 | 3 | | 2–1 | 2–6 | 0–2 | — |

Source: UEFA
16 September 1998
20:45 (19:45 UTC+1)

| Manchester United (England) | 3–3 | (Spain) Barcelona |
|---|---|---|
| Giggs 16'; Scholes 24'; Beckham 63' | Report | Anderson 47'; Giovanni 59' (pen.); Luis Enrique 70' (pen.) |

Old Trafford, Manchester
Attendance: 53,601
Referee: Stefano Braschi (Italy)
16 September 1998
20:45

| Brøndby (Denmark) | 2–1 | (Germany) Bayern Munich |
|---|---|---|
| Helmer 87' (o.g.); Ravn 89' | Report | Babbel 76' |

Parken Stadium, Copenhagen
Attendance: 30,378
Referee: László Vagner (Hungary)

30 September 1998
20:45

| Bayern Munich (Germany) | 2–2 | (England) Manchester United |
|---|---|---|
| Élber 11', 89' | Report | Yorke 30'; Scholes 49' |

Olympiastadion, Munich
Attendance: 53,000
Referee: Marc Batta (France)
30 September 1998
20:45

| Barcelona (Spain) | 2–0 | (Denmark) Brøndby |
|---|---|---|
| Anderson 44', 85' | Report |

Camp Nou, Barcelona
Attendance: 65,000
Referee: Gerd Grabher (Austria)

21 October 1998
20:45

| Brøndby (Denmark) | 2–6 | (England) Manchester United |
|---|---|---|
| Daugaard 35'; Sand 90' | Report | Giggs 2', 21'; Cole 28'; Keane 55'; Yorke 60'; Solskjær 62' |

Parken Stadium, Copenhagen
Attendance: 40,315
Referee: Vítor Melo Pereira (Portugal)
21 October 1998
20:45

| Bayern Munich (Germany) | 1–0 | (Spain) Barcelona |
|---|---|---|
| Effenberg 45' | Report |

Olympiastadion, Munich
Attendance: 56,000
Referee: Anders Frisk (Sweden)

4 November 1998
20:45

| Barcelona (Spain) | 1–2 | (Germany) Bayern Munich |
|---|---|---|
| Giovanni 29' (pen.) | Report | Zickler 48'; Salihamidžić 87' |

Camp Nou, Barcelona
Attendance: 85,000
Referee: Pierluigi Collina (Italy)
4 November 1998
20:45 (19:45 UTC+0)

| Manchester United (England) | 5–0 | (Denmark) Brøndby |
|---|---|---|
| Beckham 7'; Cole 12'; P. Neville 16'; Yorke 28'; Scholes 63' | Report |

Old Trafford, Manchester
Attendance: 53,250
Referee: Ľuboš Micheľ (Slovakia)

25 November 1998
20:45

| Barcelona (Spain) | 3–3 | (England) Manchester United |
|---|---|---|
| Anderson 1'; Rivaldo 57', 73' | Report | Yorke 25', 68'; Cole 53' |

Camp Nou, Barcelona
Attendance: 67,648
Referee: Günter Benkö (Austria)
25 November 1998
20:45

| Bayern Munich (Germany) | 2–0 | (Denmark) Brøndby |
|---|---|---|
| Jancker 51'; Basler 57' | Report |

Olympiastadion, Munich
Attendance: 34,000
Referee: Oğuz Sarvan (Turkey)

9 December 1998
20:45 (19:45 UTC+0)

| Manchester United (England) | 1–1 | (Germany) Bayern Munich |
|---|---|---|
| Keane 43' | Report | Salihamidžić 55' |

Old Trafford, Manchester
Attendance: 54,434
Referee: Dick Jol (Netherlands)
9 December 1998
20:45

| Brøndby (Denmark) | 0–2 | (Spain) Barcelona |
|---|---|---|
| | Report | Figo 6'; Rivaldo 36' |

Parken Stadium, Copenhagen
Attendance: 40,892
Referee: Nikolai Levnikov (Russia)

=== Group E ===
| Pos | Team | Pld | W | D | L | GF | GA | GD | Pts | Qualification | DKV | LEN | ARS | PAN |
|---|---|---|---|---|---|---|---|---|---|---|---|---|---|---|
| 1 | (Ukraine) Dynamo Kyiv | 6 | 3 | 2 | 1 | 11 | 7 | +4 | 11 | Advance to knockout stage | — | 1–1 | 3–1 | 2–1 |
| 2 | (France) Lens | 6 | 2 | 2 | 2 | 5 | 6 | −1 | 8 | | 1–3 | — | 1–1 | 1–0 |
| 3 | (England) Arsenal | 6 | 2 | 2 | 2 | 8 | 8 | 0 | 8 | | 1–1 | 0–1 | — | 2–1 |
| 4 | (Greece) Panathinaikos | 6 | 2 | 0 | 4 | 6 | 9 | −3 | 6 | | 2–1 | 1–0 | 1–3 | — |

Source: UEFA
16 September 1998
20:45 (21:45 UTC+3)

| Panathinaikos (Greece) | 2–1 | (Ukraine) Dynamo Kyiv |
|---|---|---|
| Mykland 56'; Liberopoulos 69' | Report | Rebrov 31' |

Nikos Goumas Stadium, Nea Filadelfeia (Note: Panathinaikos played their home match at Nikos Goumas Stadium instead of their regular stadium Olympic Stadium due to The Rolling Stones concert being held there.)
Attendance: 20,310
Referee: Vítor Melo Pereira (Portugal)
16 September 1998
20:45

| Lens (France) | 1–1 | (England) Arsenal |
|---|---|---|
| Vairelles 90+2' | Report | Overmars 51' |

Stade Félix-Bollaert, Lens
Attendance: 33,371
Referee: Hellmut Krug (Germany)

30 September 1998
20:45 (19:45 UTC+1)

| Arsenal (England) | 2–1 | (Greece) Panathinaikos |
|---|---|---|
| Adams 62'; Keown 75' | Report | Mauro 87' |

Wembley Stadium, London
Attendance: 73,454
Referee: Antonio López Nieto (Spain)
30 September 1998
20:45 (21:45 UTC+3)

| Dynamo Kyiv (Ukraine) | 1–1 | (France) Lens |
|---|---|---|
| Shevchenko 61' | Report | Vairelles 62' |

Olimpiyskiy National Sports Complex, Kyiv
Attendance: 52,500
Referee: Günter Benkö (Austria)

21 October 1998
20:45 (19:45 UTC+1)

| Arsenal (England) | 1–1 | (Ukraine) Dynamo Kyiv |
|---|---|---|
| Bergkamp 74' | Report | Rebrov 90+2' |

Wembley Stadium, London
Attendance: 73,256
Referee: Ryszard Wójcik (Poland)
21 October 1998
20:45

| Lens (France) | 1–0 | (Greece) Panathinaikos |
|---|---|---|
| Eloi 80' | Report |

Stade Félix-Bollaert, Lens
Attendance: 32,757
Referee: Dick Jol (Netherlands)

4 November 1998
20:45 (21:45 UTC+2)

| Dynamo Kyiv (Ukraine) | 3–1 | (England) Arsenal |
|---|---|---|
| Rebrov 26' (pen.); Holovko 61'; Shevchenko 72' | Report | Hughes 82' |

Olimpiyskiy National Sports Complex, Kyiv
Attendance: 76,600
Referee: Piero Ceccarini (Italy)
4 November 1998
20:45 (21:45 UTC+2)

| Panathinaikos (Greece) | 1–0 | (France) Lens |
|---|---|---|
| Vokolos 53' | Report |

Olympic Stadium, Athens
Attendance: 55,031
Referee: José García-Aranda (Spain)

25 November 1998
20:45 (19:45 UTC+0)

| Arsenal (England) | 0–1 | (France) Lens |
|---|---|---|
| | Report | Debève 72' |

Wembley Stadium, London
Attendance: 73,707
Referee: Anders Frisk (Sweden)
25 November 1998
18:45 (19:45 UTC+2)

| Dynamo Kyiv (Ukraine) | 2–1 | (Greece) Panathinaikos |
|---|---|---|
| Rebrov 72'; Basinas 80' (o.g.) | Report | Lagonikakis 36' |

Olimpiyskiy National Sports Complex, Kyiv
Attendance: 46,000
Referee: Hellmut Krug (Germany)

9 December 1998
20:45 (21:45 UTC+2)

| Panathinaikos (Greece) | 1–3 | (England) Arsenal |
|---|---|---|
| Sypniewski 74' | Report | Asanović 64' (o.g.); Anelka 80'; Boa Morte 86' |

Olympic Stadium, Athens
Attendance: 41,105
Referee: Stefano Braschi (Italy)
9 December 1998
20:45

| Lens (France) | 1–3 | (Ukraine) Dynamo Kyiv |
|---|---|---|
| Šmicer 78' | Report | Kaladze 60'; Vashchuk 75'; Shevchenko 85' |

Stade Félix-Bollaert, Lens
Attendance: 39,423
Referee: Ľuboš Micheľ (Slovakia)

=== Group F ===
| Pos | Team | Pld | W | D | L | GF | GA | GD | Pts | Qualification | KAI | BEN | PSV | HJK |
|---|---|---|---|---|---|---|---|---|---|---|---|---|---|---|
| 1 | (Germany) 1. FC Kaiserslautern | 6 | 4 | 1 | 1 | 12 | 6 | +6 | 13 | Advance to knockout stage | — | 1–0 | 3–1 | 5–2 |
| 2 | (Portugal) Benfica | 6 | 2 | 2 | 2 | 8 | 9 | −1 | 8 | | 2–1 | — | 2–1 | 2–2 |
| 3 | (Netherlands) PSV Eindhoven | 6 | 2 | 1 | 3 | 10 | 11 | −1 | 7 | | 1–2 | 2–2 | — | 2–1 |
| 4 | (Finland) HJK | 6 | 1 | 2 | 3 | 8 | 12 | −4 | 5 | | 0–0 | 2–0 | 1–3 | — |

Source: UEFA
16 September 1998
20:45

| PSV Eindhoven (Netherlands) | 2–1 | (Finland) HJK |
|---|---|---|
| Ooijer 57'; Bruggink 90+3' | Report | Kottila 32' |

Philips Stadion, Eindhoven
Attendance: 14,460
Referee: Ľuboš Micheľ (Slovakia)
16 September 1998
20:45

| 1. FC Kaiserslautern (Germany) | 1–0 | (Portugal) Benfica |
|---|---|---|
| Wagner 41' | Report |

Fritz-Walter-Stadion, Kaiserslautern
Attendance: 31,112
Referee: Pierluigi Collina (Italy)

30 September 1998
20:45 (19:45 UTC+1)

| Benfica (Portugal) | 2–1 | (Netherlands) PSV Eindhoven |
|---|---|---|
| Nuno Gomes 47'; João Pinto 76' | Report | Rommedahl 70' |

Estádio da Luz, Lisbon
Attendance: 45,000
Referee: Nikolai Levnikov (Russia)
30 September 1998
20:45 (21:45 UTC+3)

| HJK (Finland) | 0–0 | (Germany) 1. FC Kaiserslautern |
|---|---|---|
| | Report |

Olympic Stadium, Helsinki
Attendance: 21,217
Referee: Leslie Irvine (Northern Ireland)

21 October 1998
20:45

| PSV Eindhoven (Netherlands) | 1–2 | (Germany) 1. FC Kaiserslautern |
|---|---|---|
| Khokhlov 78' | Report | Riedl 67'; Rische 81' |

Philips Stadion, Eindhoven
Attendance: 20,500
Referee: Alain Sars (France)
21 October 1998
20:45 (21:45 UTC+3)

| HJK (Finland) | 2–0 | (Portugal) Benfica |
|---|---|---|
| Lehkosuo 20' (pen.); Kottila 70' | Report |

Olympic Stadium, Helsinki
Attendance: 25,126
Referee: Václav Krondl (Czech Republic)

4 November 1998
20:45

| 1. FC Kaiserslautern (Germany) | 3–1 | (Netherlands) PSV Eindhoven |
|---|---|---|
| Rische 68'; Reich 77'; Hristov 90' | Report | Van Nistelrooy 18' |

Fritz-Walter-Stadion, Kaiserslautern
Attendance: 31,444
Referee: David Elleray (England)
4 November 1998
20:45 (19:45 UTC+0)

| Benfica (Portugal) | 2–2 | (Finland) HJK |
|---|---|---|
| Nuno Gomes 78'; Calado 80' | Report | Minto 5' (o.g.); Luiz Antônio 84' |

Estádio da Luz, Lisbon
Attendance: 28,500
Referee: László Vagner (Hungary)

25 November 1998
18:45 (19:45 UTC+2)

| HJK (Finland) | 1–3 | (Netherlands) PSV Eindhoven |
|---|---|---|
| Lehkosuo 70' (pen.) | Report | Van Nistelrooy 30', 67', 82' (pen.) |

Olympic Stadium, Helsinki
Attendance: 34,146
Referee: José García-Aranda (Spain)
25 November 1998
20:45 (19:45 UTC+0)

| Benfica (Portugal) | 2–1 | (Germany) 1. FC Kaiserslautern |
|---|---|---|
| Nuno Gomes 31'; João Pinto 70' | Report | Rische 90' |

Estádio da Luz, Lisbon
Attendance: 15,000
Referee: Paul Durkin (England)

9 December 1998
20:45

| PSV Eindhoven (Netherlands) | 2–2 | (Portugal) Benfica |
|---|---|---|
| Khokhlov 41'; Van Nistelrooy 89' | Report | Nuno Gomes 47' (pen.), 64' |

Philips Stadion, Eindhoven
Attendance: 17,900
Referee: Karl-Erik Nilsson (Sweden)
9 December 1998
20:45

| 1. FC Kaiserslautern (Germany) | 5–2 | (Finland) HJK |
|---|---|---|
| Rösler 43', 61', 80'; Marschall 49'; Rische 85' | Report | Ilola 29'; Luiz Antônio 68' |

Fritz-Walter-Stadion, Kaiserslautern
Attendance: 27,310
Referee: Kim Milton Nielsen (Denmark)

== Ranking of second-placed teams ==
| Pos | Grp | Team | Pld | W | D | L | GF | GA | GD | Pts | Qualification |
|---|---|---|---|---|---|---|---|---|---|---|---|
| 1 | C | (Spain) Real Madrid | 6 | 4 | 0 | 2 | 17 | 8 | +9 | 12 | Advance to knockout stage |
| 2 | D | (England) Manchester United | 6 | 2 | 4 | 0 | 20 | 11 | +9 | 10 | Advance to knockout stage |
| 3 | B | (Turkey) Galatasaray | 6 | 2 | 2 | 2 | 8 | 8 | 0 | 8 | |
| 4 | F | (Portugal) Benfica | 6 | 2 | 2 | 2 | 8 | 9 | −1 | 8 | |
| 5 | E | (France) Lens | 6 | 2 | 2 | 2 | 5 | 6 | −1 | 8 | |
| 6 | A | Croatia Zagreb | 6 | 2 | 2 | 2 | 5 | 7 | −2 | 8 | |

Source: RSSSF
Rules for classification: 1) Points; 2) Goal difference; 3) Goals scored; 4) Away goals scored; 5) Association coefficient; 6) Club coefficient.
