= Mika Kottila =

Finnish footballer (born 1974)

Personal information
- Full name: Mika Antero Kottila
- Date of birth: 22 September 1974 (age 52)
- Place of birth: Vantaa, Finland
- Height: 1.95 m (6 ft 5 in)
- Position: Forward

Senior career*
Years	Team	Apps	(Gls)
1993	Helsingin Ponnistus	26	(8)
1994–1995	HJK	33	(6)
1996	RoPS	14	(2)
1996–1997	Hereford United	13	(1)
1997–1998	HJK	51	(8)
1999	Brann	13	(1)
2000–2001	Trelleborg	45	(9)
2002–2004	HJK	74	(33)
2005–2006	Lahti	32	(6)

International career
1995–2004	Finland	32	(7)
- * Club domestic league appearances and goals

Mika Antero Kottila, nicknamed Hirvi, (born 22 September 1974) is a Finnish former professional footballer. He played as a forward and spent the vast majority of his career playing in Nordic countries.

== Club career ==
Kottila was born in Vantaa, Finland. He joined RoPS in 1992. He had a spell on loan at Hereford United during the 1996–97 season. He made 13 league appearances, scoring 1 goal.

He then joined HJK Helsinki for the second of three spells, having previously played for the club during the 1994 season. He made 157 appearances and scored 56 goals for the club during his three spells. The top moment of his career came when he scored two goals for HJK in the UEFA Champions League group stage in 1998.

He joined a Norwegian Tippeligaen club SK Brann for a €500,000 transfer fee, where he was in the 1999 season, and then Sweden to play for Trelleborgs FF. A third spell at HJK followed between 2002 and 2004. He also featured in the 2004 UEFA Champions League playing against the likes of Linfield and Maccabi Tel Aviv F.C. in the qualifying rounds.

Between 2005 and 2006 he played for FC Lahti in the Finnish Premier Division.

== International career ==
He was capped 32 times for Finland, scoring seven goals between 1998 and 2004.

== Career statistics ==
As of 1 September 2024.

Appearances and goals by club, season and competition
Club	Season	League			Cup (Note: Includes Suomen Cup)		Europe		Total	
Club	Season	Division	Apps	Goals	Apps	Goals	Apps	Goals	Apps	Goals
MPS	1991	Kolmonen								
MPS	1992	Kolmonen								
MPS	Total		37	21	0	0	0	0	37	21
Ponnistus	1992	Kakkonen	26	8	–		–		26	8
HJK	1994	Veikkausliiga	12	2	–		2 (Note: Appearances in UEFA Cup Winners' Cup)	1	14	3
HJK	1995	Veikkausliiga	21	4	–		3 (Note: Appearances in UEFA Intertoto Cup)	2	24	6
HJK	Total		33	6	0	0	5	3	38	9
RoPS	1996	Veikkausliiga	14	2	–		–		14	2
Hereford United	1996–97	Third Division	13	1	–		–		13	1
HJK	1997	Veikkausliiga	25	7	–		2	0	27	7
HJK	1998	Veikkausliiga	26	1	1	0	9 (Note: Appearances in UEFA Champions League)	2	36	3
HJK	Total		51	8	1	0	11	2	63	10
Brann	1999	Tippeligaen	13	1	2	2	–		15	3
Brann 2	1999	2. divisjon	1	0	–		–		1	0
Trelleborg	2000	Allsvenskan	23	7	–		–		23	7
Trelleborg	2001	Allsvenskan	22	2	–		–		22	2
Trelleborg	Total		45	9	0	0	0	0	45	9
HJK	2002	Veikkausliiga	29	18	–		2 (Note: Appearancess in UEFA Euro Cup)	0	31	18
HJK	2003	Veikkausliiga	23	11	1	0	4	1	28	12
HJK	2004	Veikkausliiga	22	7	–		4	2	26	9
HJK	Total		74	36	1	0	10	2	85	38
Lahti	2005	Veikkausliiga	25	4	–		–		25	4
Lahti	2006	Veikkausliiga	7	2	–		–		7	2
Lahti	Total		32	6	0	0	0	0	32	6
Career total			339	97	4	2	26	7	369	106

=== International ===
As of match played 16 May 2004

Finland
Year	Apps	Goals
1995	1	0
1996	0	0
1997	0	0
1998	2	0
1999	4	0
2000	8	2
2001	5	1
2002	5	3
2003	5	1
2004	2	0
Total	32	7

=== International goals ===
As of match played 29 February 2003. Finland score listed first, score column indicates score after each Kottila goal.

List of international goals scored by Mika Kottila
No.	Date	Venue	Opponent	Score	Result	Competition
1	23 February 2000	Rajamangala Stadium, Bangkok, Thailand	Estonia	1–0	4–2	King's Cup
2	23 February 2000	Rajamangala Stadium, Bangkok, Thailand	Estonia	3–0	4–2	King's Cup
3	15 February 2001	Al-Sadaqua Walsalam Stadium, Kuwait City, Kuwait	Kuwait	1–0	3–4	Friendly
4	4 January 2002	Bahrain National Stadium, Riffa, Bahrain	Bahrain	1–0	2–0	Friendly
5	10 January 2002	Bahrain National Stadium, Riffa, Bahrain	North Macedonia	1–0	3–0	Friendly
6	10 January 2002	Bahrain National Stadium, Riffa, Bahrain	North Macedonia	3–0	3–0	Friendly
7	29 January 2003	Hasely Crawford Stadium, Port of Spain, Trinidad and Tobago	Trinidad and Tobago	1–1	2–1	Friendly

== Honours ==
HJK

- Veikkausliiga: 1997, 2002, 2003
- Finnish Cup: 1998, 2003

Individual

- Veikkausliiga top scorer: 2002
