= Richard Teberio =

Swedish footballer

Personal information
- Date of birth: 17 October 1971 (age 55)
- Place of birth: Gothenburg, Sweden
- Position: Forward

Senior career*
Years	Team	Apps	(Gls)
1993–1995	Västra Frölunda	40	(9)
1996	Kalmar FF	6	(0)
1996	Degerfors IF		
1996	FC Andorra		
1997	Assyriska FF		
1997	Croatia Zagreb		
1998	Nybergsund IL-Trysil		
1999–2003	Inter Turku		
2003–2004	VG-62		
2004	Inter Turku		
- * Club domestic league appearances and goals

Richard Teberio (born 17 October 1971) is a Swedish retired football striker.
