= Aristides Pertot =

Argentine footballer

Arístides Pertot
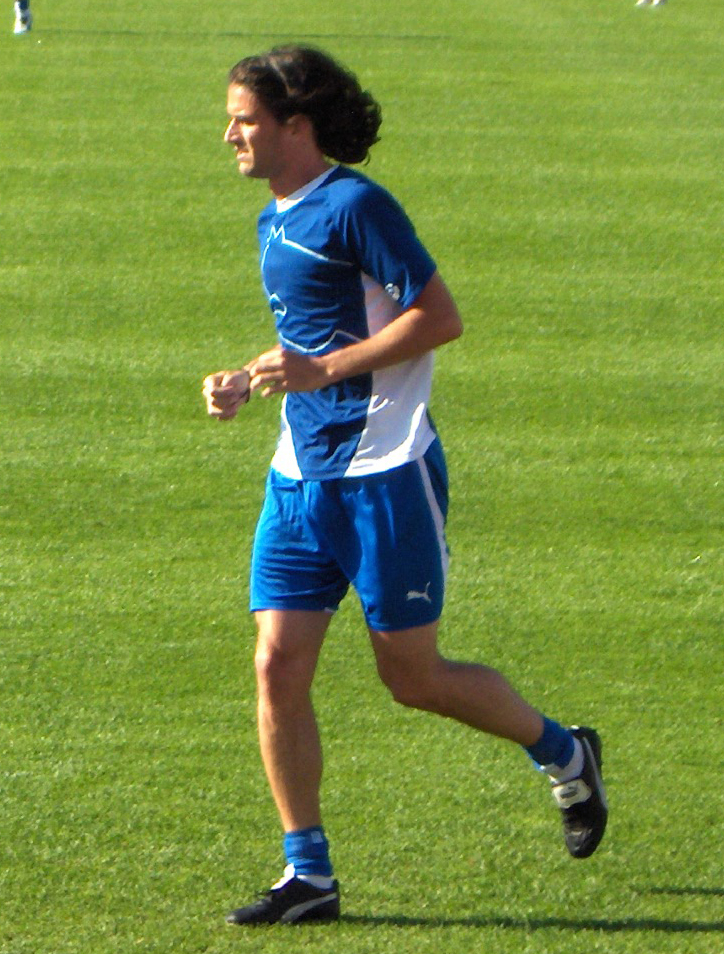

Personal information
- Full name: Arístides Laureano Pertot
- Date of birth: 24 September 1976 (age 50)
- Place of birth: Lanús, Argentina
- Height: 1.80 m (5 ft 11 in)
- Position: Midfielder

Senior career*
| Years | Team | Apps | (Gls) |
| 1995–2000 | Deportivo Español | 54 | (7) |
| 2000–2005 | FC Inter Turku | 140 | (46) |
| 2006 | Tampere United | 20 | (4) |
| 2007–2008 | Temperley | 7 | (1) |
| 2008 | TPS Turku | 24 | (6) |
| 2009–2010 | FC Inter Turku | 18 | (1) |
- * Club domestic league appearances and goals

Arístides Pertot (born 24 September 1976 in Lanús) is a former Argentine footballer.
