= 1998–99 UEFA Champions League knockout stage =

International football competition

The knockout stage of the 1998–99 UEFA Champions League began on 3 March 1999, and ended with the final at the Camp Nou in Barcelona, Spain, on 26 May 1999. The six group winners in the group stage, as well as the two best runners-up, competed in the knockout stage. For the quarter-finals, two group winners were randomly drawn against the two best runners-up from another group while the other four group winners face each other with the restriction that the two best runners-up cannot be drawn against the winners of their own group. The four quarter-final winners were then drawn together for the semi-finals, the winners of which contested the final.

Each quarter-final and semi-final was played over two legs, with each team playing one leg at home; the team that scored the most goals over the two legs qualified for the following round. If the two teams scored the same number of goals over the two legs, the team that scored more goals away from home qualified for the next round; if both teams scored the same number of away goals, matches would go to golden goal extra time and then penalties if the teams could not be separated after extra time.

== Qualified teams ==
Group	Winners	Runners-up (best two qualify)
A	(Greece) Olympiacos	—N/a
B	(Italy) Juventus	—N/a
C	(Italy) Internazionale	(Spain) Real Madrid
D	(Germany) Bayern Munich	(England) Manchester United
E	(Ukraine) Dynamo Kyiv	—N/a
F	(Germany) 1. FC Kaiserslautern	—N/a

== Bracket ==
Quarter-finals
(England) Manchester United	2	1	3
(Italy) Internazionale	0	1	1
(Italy) Juventus	2	1	3
(Greece) Olympiacos	1	1	2
(Spain) Real Madrid	1	0	1
(Ukraine) Dynamo Kyiv	1	2	3
(Germany) Bayern Munich	2	4	6
(Germany) 1. FC Kaiserslautern	0	0	0

Semi-finals
(England) Manchester United	1	3	4
(Italy) Juventus	1	2	3
(Ukraine) Dynamo Kyiv	3	0	3
(Germany) Bayern Munich	3	1	4

Final
26 May – Barcelona
(England) Manchester United	2
(Germany) Bayern Munich	1

== Quarter-finals ==
=== Summary ===
Team 1	Agg.	Team 2	1st leg	2nd leg
Real Madrid (Spain)	1–3	(Ukraine) Dynamo Kyiv	1–1	0–2
Manchester United (England)	3–1	(Italy) Internazionale	2–0	1–1
Juventus (Italy)	3–2	(Greece) Olympiacos	2–1	1–1
Bayern Munich (Germany)	6–0	(Germany) 1. FC Kaiserslautern	2–0	4–0

=== Matches ===
3 March 1999
20:45

Real Madrid (Spain)	1–1	(Ukraine) Dynamo Kyiv
Mijatović 66'	Report	Shevchenko 54'

Santiago Bernabéu, Madrid
Attendance: 35,183
Referee: Stefano Braschi (Italy)
17 March 1999
21:45

Dynamo Kyiv (Ukraine)	2–0	(Spain) Real Madrid
Shevchenko 62', 79'	Report

Olympic Stadium, Kyiv
Attendance: 81,500
Referee: Anders Frisk (Sweden)

Dynamo Kyiv won 3–1 on aggregate.

3 March 1999
19:45

Manchester United (England)	2–0	(Italy) Internazionale
Yorke 7', 45+1'	Report

Old Trafford, Manchester
Attendance: 54,682
Referee: Hellmut Krug (Germany)
17 March 1999
20:45

Internazionale (Italy)	1–1	(England) Manchester United
Ventola 63'	Report	Scholes 88'

San Siro, Milan
Attendance: 79,528
Referee: Gilles Veissière (France)

Manchester United won 3–1 on aggregate.

3 March 1999
20:45

Juventus (Italy)	2–1	(Greece) Olympiacos
Inzaghi 38'; Conte 79'	Report	Niniadis 90+7' (pen.)

Stadio delle Alpi, Turin
Attendance: 33,871
Referee: José María García-Aranda (Spain)
17 March 1999
21:45

Olympiacos (Greece)	1–1	(Italy) Juventus
Gogić 12'	Report	Conte 85'

Olympic Stadium, Athens
Attendance: 71,022
Referee: Markus Merk (Germany)

Juventus won 3–2 on aggregate.

3 March 1999
20:45

Bayern Munich (Germany)	2–0	(Germany) 1. FC Kaiserslautern
Élber 31'; Effenberg 35'	Report

Olympiastadion, Munich
Attendance: 54,000
Referee: Nikolay Levnikov (Russia)
17 March 1999
20:45

1. FC Kaiserslautern (Germany)	0–4	(Germany) Bayern Munich
	Report	Effenberg 9'; Jancker 22'; Rösler 39' (o.g.); Basler 56'

Fritz-Walter-Stadion, Kaiserslautern
Attendance: 30,158
Referee: Urs Meier (Switzerland)

Bayern Munich won 6–0 on aggregate.

== Semi-finals ==
=== Summary ===
Team 1	Agg.	Team 2	1st leg	2nd leg
Manchester United (England)	4–3	(Italy) Juventus	1–1	3–2
Dynamo Kyiv (Ukraine)	3–4	(Germany) Bayern Munich	3–3	0–1

=== Matches ===
7 April 1999
19:45

Manchester United (England)	1–1	(Italy) Juventus
Giggs 90+2'	Report	Conte 25'

Old Trafford, Manchester
Attendance: 54,487
Referee: Manuel Díaz Vega (Spain)
21 April 1999
20:45

Juventus (Italy)	2–3	(England) Manchester United
Inzaghi 6', 11'	Report	Keane 24'; Yorke 34'; Cole 84'

Stadio delle Alpi, Turin
Attendance: 60,806
Referee: Urs Meier (Switzerland)

Manchester United won 4–3 on aggregate.

7 April 1999
21:45

Dynamo Kyiv (Ukraine)	3–3	(Germany) Bayern Munich
Shevchenko 16', 43'; Kosovskyi 50'	Report	Tarnat 45'; Effenberg 78'; Jancker 88'

Olimpiysky, Kyiv
Attendance: 79,900
Referee: Kim Milton Nielsen (Denmark)
21 April 1999
20:45

Bayern Munich (Germany)	1–0	(Ukraine) Dynamo Kyiv
Basler 35'	Report

Olympic Stadium, Munich
Attendance: 60,000
Referee: Vítor Melo Pereira (Portugal)

Bayern Munich won 4–3 on aggregate.

== Final ==
The final was played on 26 May 1999 at the Camp Nou in Barcelona, Spain.

26 May 1999
20:45

Manchester United (England)	2–1	(Germany) Bayern Munich
Sheringham 90+1'; Solskjær 90+3'	Report	Basler 6'

Camp Nou, Barcelona
Attendance: 90,245
Referee: Pierluigi Collina (Italy)
