= 1998–99 UEFA Champions League qualifying rounds =

European football tournament

Two qualifying rounds comprised the first stage of the 1998–99 UEFA Champions League, the 44th season of Europe's premier club football competition and the seventh since it was rebranded as the UEFA Champions League. The stage determined which 16 teams joined the eight automatic qualifiers in the group stage. 32 teams entered at the first qualifying round, with a further 16 teams receiving a bye to the second qualifying round. Among the teams in the first qualifying round was Ukrainian side Dynamo Kyiv, who went on to reach the semi-finals of the competition proper, while both finalists – Manchester United of England and Bayern Munich of Germany – entered the competition in the second qualifying round, having finished as runners-up in their domestic leagues the previous season.

== Teams ==
The national champions from associations ranked 8 and below, along with all league runners-up, entered the qualifying rounds.

Key to colours
Winners of second qualifying round advanced to group stage
Losers of second qualifying round entered UEFA Cup first round

Second qualifying round
Assoc.	Team
1	(Italy) Internazionale
2	(Germany) Bayern Munich
3	(Spain) Athletic Bilbao
4	(France) Metz
5	(Netherlands) PSV Eindhoven
6	(England) Manchester United
7	(Portugal) Benfica
8	(Greece) Olympiacos
8	(Greece) Panathinaikos
9	(Czech Republic) Sparta Prague
10	(Norway) Rosenborg
11	(Austria) Sturm Graz
12	(Russia) Spartak Moscow
13	Croatia Zagreb
14	(Turkey) Galatasaray
15	(Denmark) Brøndby

First qualifying round
Assoc.	Team
16	(Switzerland) Grasshopper
17	(Ukraine) Dynamo Kyiv
18	(Poland) ŁKS Łódź
19	(Hungary) Újpest
20	(Belgium) Club Brugge
21	(Slovakia) Košice
22	(Romania) Steaua București
23	(Sweden) Halmstads BK
24	(Georgia (country)) Dinamo Tbilisi
25	(Cyprus) Anorthosis Famagusta
26	(Scotland) Celtic
27	(Israel) Beitar Jerusalem
28	(Slovenia) Maribor
29	(Belarus) Dinamo Minsk
30	(Iceland) ÍBV
31	(Finland) HJK
32	(Latvia) Skonto
33	(Bulgaria) Litex Lovech
34	(North Macedonia) Sileks
35	(Lithuania) Kareda
36	(Federal Republic of Yugoslavia) Obilić
37	(Moldova) Zimbru Chișinău
39	(Estonia) Flora
40	(Armenia) Yerevan
41	(Northern Ireland) Cliftonville
42	(Malta) Valletta
43	(Wales) Barry Town
44	(Republic of Ireland) St Patrick's Athletic
45	(Faroe Islands) B36
46	(Albania) Vllaznia
47	(Luxembourg) Jeunesse Esch
48	(Azerbaijan) Kapaz

== First qualifying round ==
=== Seeding ===
32 champions from associations ranked 16–48 (except Liechtenstein) started in First qualifying round. Champions of nations ranked 16–31 were seeded, while champions of nations ranked 32 and below were unseeded. The draw was performed on 6 July 1998 in Geneva, Switzerland.

Seeded		Unseeded	
(Switzerland) Grasshopper; (Ukraine) Dynamo Kyiv; (Poland) ŁKS Łódź; (Hungary) Újpest; (Belgium) Club Brugge; (Slovakia) Košice; (Romania) Steaua București; (Sweden) Halmstads BK	(Georgia (country)) Dinamo Tbilisi; (Cyprus) Anorthosis Famagusta; (Scotland) Celtic; (Israel) Beitar Jerusalem; (Slovenia) Maribor; (Belarus) Dinamo Minsk; (Iceland) ÍBV; (Finland) HJK	(Latvia) Skonto; (Bulgaria) Litex Lovech; (North Macedonia) Sileks; (Lithuania) Kareda; (Federal Republic of Yugoslavia) Obilić; (Moldova) Zimbru Chișinău; (Estonia) Flora; (Armenia) Yerevan	(Northern Ireland) Cliftonville; (Malta) Valletta; (Wales) Barry Town; (Republic of Ireland) St Patrick's Athletic; (Faroe Islands) B36; (Albania) Vllaznia; (Luxembourg) Jeunesse Esch; (Azerbaijan) Kapaz

=== Summary ===
Team 1	Agg.	Team 2	1st leg	2nd leg
Sileks (North Macedonia)	1–2	(Belgium) Club Brugge	0–0	1–2
ŁKS Łódź (Poland)	7–2	(Azerbaijan) Kapaz	4–1	3–1
Litex Lovech (Bulgaria)	3–2	(Sweden) Halmstads BK	2–0	1–2
Grasshopper (Switzerland)	8–0	(Luxembourg) Jeunesse Esch	6–0	2–0
Celtic (Scotland)	2–0	(Republic of Ireland) St Patrick's Athletic	0–0	2–0
Kareda (Lithuania)	0–4	(Slovenia) Maribor	0–3	0–1
Dynamo Kyiv (Ukraine)	10–1	(Wales) Barry Town	8–0	2–1
Cliftonville (Northern Ireland)	1–13	(Slovakia) Košice	1–5	0–8
Skonto (Latvia)	2–1	(Belarus) Dinamo Minsk	0–0	2–1
Valletta (Malta)	0–8	(Cyprus) Anorthosis Famagusta	0–2	0–6
Beitar Jerusalem (Israel)	5–1	(Faroe Islands) B36	4–1	1–0
Dinamo Tbilisi (Georgia (country))	4–3	(Albania) Vllaznia	3–0 (Note: Awarded)	1–3
HJK (Finland)	5–0	(Armenia) Yerevan	2–0	3–0
Obilić (Federal Republic of Yugoslavia)	4–1	(Iceland) ÍBV	2–0	2–1
Zimbru Chișinău (Moldova)	2–3	(Hungary) Újpest	1–0	1–3
Steaua București (Romania)	5–4	(Estonia) Flora	4–1	1–3

=== Matches ===
22 July 1998
17:00

Sileks (North Macedonia)	0–0	(Belgium) Club Brugge
	Report

Stadion Sileks, Kratovo
Attendance: 2,400
Referee: Juan Brito Arceo (Spain)
29 July 1998
20:30

Club Brugge (Belgium)	2–1	(North Macedonia) Sileks
Vermant 3'; Claessens 30'	Report	Božinov 76'

Jan Breydelstadion, Bruges
Attendance: 3,317
Referee: Syarhey Shmolik (Belarus)

Club Brugge won 2–1 on aggregate.

22 July 1998
18:00

ŁKS Łódź (Poland)	4–1	(Azerbaijan) Kapaz
Cebula 12'; Trzeciak 50' (pen.), 76' (pen.); Wieszczycki 72'	Report	İ. Süleymanov 82'

Stadion ŁKS, Łódź
Attendance: 2,800
Referee: Amit Klein (Israel)
29 July 1998
17:30

Kapaz (Azerbaijan)	1–3	(Poland) ŁKS Łódź
Smirnov 55'	Report	Trzeciak 45', 49'; Wieszczycki 82'

Ganja City Stadium, Ganja
Attendance: 8,000
Referee: Konrad Plautz (Austria)

ŁKS Łódź won 7–2 on aggregate.

22 July 1998
21:15

Litex Lovech (Bulgaria)	2–0	(Sweden) Halmstads BK
Bushi 9'; Yurukov 90'	Report

Stadion Neftochimik, Burgas (Note: Played at Stadion Neftochimik in Burgas because Litex Lovech's Gradski Stadion in Lovech did not meet UEFA standards.)
Attendance: 10,000
Referee: Miroslav Liba (Czech Republic)
29 July 1998
20:00

Halmstads BK (Sweden)	2–1	(Bulgaria) Litex Lovech
Šakiri 38'; Arvidsson 42'	Report	Yurukov 78'

Örjans Vall, Halmstad
Attendance: 3,438
Referee: Attila Juhos (Hungary)

Litex Lovech won 3–2 on aggregate.

22 July 1998
19:30

Grasshopper (Switzerland)	6–0	(Luxembourg) Jeunesse Esch
Nkufo 6', 51'; Kavelashvili 28'; Cabanas 41'; Tikva 65' (pen.); Tararache 90'	Report

Hardturm, Zurich
Attendance: 4,800
Referee: Sergei Gusev (Russia)
29 July 1998
20:00

Jeunesse Esch (Luxembourg)	0–2	(Switzerland) Grasshopper
	Report	Esposito 36' (pen.); Türkyilmaz 44'

Stade de la Frontière, Esch-sur-Alzette
Attendance: 612
Referee: John McDermott (Republic of Ireland)

Grasshopper won 8–0 on aggregate.

22 July 1998
19:45

Celtic (Scotland)	0–0	(Republic of Ireland) St Patrick's Athletic
	Report

Celtic Park, Glasgow
Attendance: 56,865
Referee: Bohdan Benedik (Slovakia)
29 July 1998
19:45

St Patrick's Athletic (Republic of Ireland)	0–2	(Scotland) Celtic
	Report	Brattbakk 12'; Larsson 71'

Tolka Park, Dublin
Attendance: 8,929
Referee: Mikko Vuorela (Finland)

Celtic won 2–0 on aggregate.

22 July 1998
18:00

Kareda (Lithuania)	0–3	(Slovenia) Maribor
	Report	Gajser 42', 87'; Filipović 70'

Savivaldybė Stadium, Šiauliai
Attendance: 2,500
Referee: Brian Lawlor (Wales)
29 July 1998
18:00

Maribor (Slovenia)	1–0	(Lithuania) Kareda
Balajić 77'	Report

Ljudski vrt, Maribor
Attendance: 2,405
Referee: Claus Bo Larsen (Denmark)

Maribor won 4–0 on aggregate.

22 July 1998
20:00

Dynamo Kyiv (Ukraine)	8–0	(Wales) Barry Town
Rebrov 9', 16', 37', 81'; Shevchenko 32', 58'; Gerasimenko 48'; Byalkevich 65'	Report

Stadion Dynamo, Kyiv
Attendance: 11,800
Referee: Andreas Georgiou (Cyprus)
29 July 1998
19:30

Barry Town (Wales)	1–2	(Ukraine) Dynamo Kyiv
Williams 30'	Report	Mykhaylenko 10'; Venhlinskyi 49'

Jenner Park, Barry
Attendance: 890
Referee: Bujar Pregia (Albania)

Dynamo Kyiv won 10–1 on aggregate.

22 July 1998
19:30

Cliftonville (Northern Ireland)	1–5	(Slovakia) Košice
Flynn 45'	Report	Zvara 22', 29'; Németh 36'; Lyubarskyi 65'; Prohászka 76'

Solitude, Belfast
Attendance: 1,492
Referee: Gylfi Orrason (Iceland)
29 July 1998
19:00

Košice (Slovakia)	8–0	(Northern Ireland) Cliftonville
Kozák 4'; Janočko 15', 54'; Németh 32'; Prohászka 58', 73'; Lyubarskyi 67'; Kožlej 83'	Report

Všešportový areál, Košice
Attendance: 1,948
Referee: Milan Mitrovič (Slovenia)

Košice won 13–1 on aggregate.

22 July 1998
19:00

Skonto (Latvia)	0–0	(Belarus) Dinamo Minsk
	Report

Daugava Stadium, Riga
Attendance: 2,600
Referee: Robert Sedlacek (Austria)
29 July 1998
18:00

Dinamo Minsk (Belarus)	1–2	(Latvia) Skonto
Asipovich 25'	Report	Astafjevs 44'; Novikovs 72'

Dinamo Stadium, Minsk
Attendance: 5,700
Referee: Constantin Zotta (Romania)

Skonto won 2–1 on aggregate.

22 July 1998
20:00

Valletta (Malta)	0–2	(Cyprus) Anorthosis Famagusta
	Report	Elia 49'; Okkas 78'

National Stadium, Ta' Qali
Attendance: 1,706
Referee: Joaquim Bento Marques (Portugal)
29 July 1998
21:00

Anorthosis Famagusta (Cyprus)	6–0	(Malta) Valletta
Ćirić 16'; Charalambous 18'; Andreou 45' (pen.); Sotiriou 52', 90'; Okkas 71'	Report

Antonis Papadopoulos Stadium, Larnaca
Attendance: 5,000
Referee: Ladislav Gádoši (Slovakia)

Anorthosis Famagusta won 8–0 on aggregate.

22 July 1998
18:00

Beitar Jerusalem (Israel)	4–1	(Faroe Islands) B36
Shitrit 2'; Sallói 9', 45', 78'	Report	Petersen 73' (pen.)

Teddy Stadium, Jerusalem
Attendance: 7,000
Referee: Spyros Papadakos (Greece)
27 July 1998
19:00

B36 (Faroe Islands)	0–1	(Israel) Beitar Jerusalem
	Report	Hamar 68'

Svangaskarð, Toftir
Attendance: 285
Referee: Algirdas Dubinskas (Lithuania)

Beitar Jerusalem won 5–1 on aggregate.

22 July 1998
19:00

Dinamo Tbilisi (Georgia (country))	3–0 Awarded (Note: The first leg originally finished 1–0 to Dinamo Tbilisi, but later was awarded to them 3–0 by default after Vllaznia fielded an ineligible player.)	(Albania) Vllaznia
Khomeriki 52'	Report

Boris Paichadze Dinamo Arena, Tbilisi
Attendance: 7,800
Referee: Carlo Bertolini (Switzerland)
29 July 1998
17:00

Vllaznia (Albania)	3–1	(Georgia (country)) Dinamo Tbilisi
Cungu 14'; Miloti 86'; Noga 90' (pen.)	Report	Ashvetia 88'

Qemal Stafa Stadium, Tirana
Attendance: 1,155
Referee: Alfred Micallef (Malta)

Dinamo Tbilisi won 4–3 on aggregate.

22 July 1998
19:00

HJK (Finland)	2–0	(Armenia) Yerevan
Wiss 50'; Kuqi 85'	Report

Olympiastadion, Helsinki
Attendance: 2,317
Referee: Roland Beck (Liechtenstein)
29 July 1998
19:00

Yerevan (Armenia)	0–3	(Finland) HJK
	Report	Lehkosuo 1', 79' (pen.); Jäväjä 28'

Hrazdan Stadium, Yerevan
Attendance: 1,500
Referee: Hans-Jürgen Weber (Germany)

HJK won 5–0 on aggregate.

22 July 1998
17:00

Obilić (Federal Republic of Yugoslavia)	2–0	(Iceland) ÍBV
Juškić 17'; Grozdić 64'	Report

Stadion FK Obilić, Belgrade
Attendance: 1,500
Referee: Peter Jones (England)
29 July 1998
18:00

ÍBV (Iceland)	1–2	(Federal Republic of Yugoslavia) Obilić
Hafliðason 21'	Report	Vasiljević 61'; Grozdić 89'

Hásteinsvöllur, Vestmannaeyjar
Attendance: 654
Referee: John Rowbotham (Scotland)

Obilić won 4–1 on aggregate.

22 July 1998
18:00

Zimbru Chișinău (Moldova)	1–0	(Hungary) Újpest
Kulyk 11' (pen.)	Report

Stadionul Republican, Chișinău
Attendance: 4,000
Referee: Tomasz Mikulski (Poland)
29 July 1998
20:00

Újpest (Hungary)	3–1	(Moldova) Zimbru Chișinău
Miriuță 18'; Z. Kovács 72', 89'	Report	Kulyk 28'

Megyeri úti Stadion, Budapest
Attendance: 3,050
Referee: Georgios Psychomanis (Greece)

Újpest won 3–2 on aggregate.

22 July 1998
20:45

Steaua București (Romania)	4–1	(Estonia) Flora
Ciocoiu 12', 38'; Șerban 78' (pen.); Dănciulescu 90'	Report	Terehhov 41'

Stadionul Steaua, Bucharest
Attendance: 5,603
Referee: Oğuz Sarvan (Turkey)
29 July 1998
17:00

Flora (Estonia)	3–1	(Romania) Steaua București
Smirnov 41'; Zelinski 46'; Oper 80'	Report	Dănciulescu 70'

Kadriorg Stadium, Tallinn
Attendance: 1,500
Referee: John Ferry (Northern Ireland)

Steaua București won 5–4 on aggregate.

== Second qualifying round ==
=== Seeding ===
16 clubs (champions of nations ranked 8–15 and runners-up of nations ranked 1–8) started in this round and were seeded. 16 winners of the First qualifying round were unseeded. Losing teams in the second qualifying round qualified for the first round of the 1998–99 UEFA Cup. The draw was performed on 6 July 1998 in Geneva, Switzerland, immediately after First qualifying round draw.

Seeded		Unseeded	
(Italy) Internazionale; (Germany) Bayern Munich; (Spain) Athletic Bilbao; (France) Metz; (Netherlands) PSV Eindhoven; (England) Manchester United; (Portugal) Benfica; (Greece) Olympiacos	(Greece) Panathinaikos; (Czech Republic) Sparta Prague; (Norway) Rosenborg; (Austria) Sturm Graz; (Russia) Spartak Moscow; Croatia Zagreb; (Turkey) Galatasaray; (Denmark) Brøndby	(Switzerland) Grasshopper; (Ukraine) Dynamo Kyiv; (Poland) ŁKS Łódź; (Hungary) Újpest; (Belgium) Club Brugge; (Slovakia) Košice; (Romania) Steaua București; (Bulgaria) Litex Lovech	(Georgia (country)) Dinamo Tbilisi; (Cyprus) Anorthosis Famagusta; (Scotland) Celtic; (Israel) Beitar Jerusalem; (Slovenia) Maribor; (Latvia) Skonto; (Federal Republic of Yugoslavia) Obilić; (Finland) HJK

Notes

1. ^{†} Winners of the previous qualifying round whose identity was not known at the time of the draw. Teams in italics defeated a team with a higher association coefficient, thus effectively taking the association coefficient of their opponent in the draw.

=== Summary ===
The losing teams qualified for the first round of the 1998–99 UEFA Cup. The winning teams of the first qualifying round were drawn against teams qualified directly for the second qualifying round.

Team 1	Agg.	Team 2	1st leg	2nd leg
Rosenborg (Norway)	4–4 (a)	(Belgium) Club Brugge	2–0	2–4
Manchester United (England)	2–0	(Poland) ŁKS Łódź	2–0	0–0
Litex Lovech (Bulgaria)	2–11	(Russia) Spartak Moscow	0–5	2–6
Galatasaray (Turkey)	5–3	(Switzerland) Grasshopper	2–1	3–2
Celtic (Scotland)	1–3	Croatia Zagreb	1–0	0–3
Maribor (Slovenia)	3–5	(Netherlands) PSV Eindhoven	2–1	1–4 (a.e.t.)
Dynamo Kyiv (Ukraine)	1–1 (3–1 p)	(Czech Republic) Sparta Prague	0–1	1–0 (a.e.t.)
Košice (Slovakia)	1–2	(Denmark) Brøndby	0–2	1–0
Internazionale (Italy)	7–1	(Latvia) Skonto	4–0	3–1
Olympiacos (Greece)	6–3	(Cyprus) Anorthosis Famagusta	2–1	4–2
Benfica (Portugal)	8–4	(Israel) Beitar Jerusalem	6–0	2–4
Dinamo Tbilisi (Georgia (country))	2–2 (a)	(Spain) Athletic Bilbao	2–1	0–1
HJK (Finland)	2–1	(France) Metz	1–0	1–1
Bayern Munich (Germany)	5–1	(Federal Republic of Yugoslavia) Obilić	4–0	1–1
Sturm Graz (Austria)	7–2	(Hungary) Újpest	4–0	3–2
Steaua București (Romania)	5–8	(Greece) Panathinaikos	2–2	3–6

=== Matches ===
12 August 1998
20:15

Rosenborg (Norway)	2–0	(Belgium) Club Brugge
Rushfeldt 62'; Skammelsrud 82'	Report

Lerkendal Stadion, Trondheim
Attendance: 12,191
Referee: Hugh Dallas (Scotland)
26 August 1998
20:15

Club Brugge (Belgium)	4–2	(Norway) Rosenborg
Fadiga 22'; Claessens 47', 83'; Schockaert 78'	Report	Rushfeldt 44', 72'

Jan Breydel Stadium, Bruges
Attendance: 7,000
Referee: Urs Meier (Switzerland)

4–4 on aggregate; Rosenborg won on away goals.

12 August 1998
19:45

Manchester United (England)	2–0	(Poland) ŁKS Łódź
Giggs 16'; Cole 80'	Report

Old Trafford, Manchester
Attendance: 50,906
Referee: Atanas Uzunov (Bulgaria)
26 August 1998
21:05

ŁKS Łódź (Poland)	0–0	(England) Manchester United
	Report

Stadion ŁKS, Łódź
Attendance: 8,700
Referee: Graziano Cesari (Italy)

Manchester United won 2–0 on aggregate.

12 August 1998
21:15

Litex Lovech (Bulgaria)	0–5	(Russia) Spartak Moscow
	Report	Pisarev 55', 86'; Leomar 76'; Titov 66'; Tsymbalar 90'

Neftochimik Stadium, Burgas
Attendance: 15,000
Referee: Alain Sars (France)
26 August 1998
19:00

Spartak Moscow (Russia)	6–2	(Bulgaria) Litex Lovech
Tikhonov 6', 31'; Titov 35'; Tsymbalar 49'; Robson 54', 90'	Report	Belyakov 27'; Bushi 70'

Luzhniki Stadium, Moscow
Attendance: 10,000
Referee: Ľuboš Micheľ (Slovakia)

Spartak Moscow won 11–2 on aggregate.

12 August 1998
19:00

Galatasaray (Turkey)	2–1	(Switzerland) Grasshopper
Hagi 58' (pen.); Şükür 66'	Report	Vogel 85' (pen.)

Ali Sami Yen Stadium, Istanbul
Attendance: 21,043
Referee: Marc Batta (France)
26 August 1998
20:00

Grasshopper (Switzerland)	2–3	(Turkey) Galatasaray
Türkyilmaz 50'; Vogel 70' (pen.)	Report	Şükür 17', 46'; Hagi 64' (pen.)

Hardturm, Zürich
Attendance: 15,000
Referee: Vítor Melo Pereira (Portugal)

Galatasaray won 5–3 on aggregate.

12 August 1998
19:45

Celtic (Scotland)	1–0	Croatia Zagreb
Jackson 51'	Report

Celtic Park, Glasgow
Attendance: 51,335
Referee: José María García-Aranda (Spain)
26 August 1998
20:30

Croatia Zagreb	3–0	(Scotland) Celtic
Marić 22'; Prosinečki 45' (pen.), 68'	Report

Maksimir, Zagreb
Attendance: 23,570
Referee: Pierluigi Collina (Italy)

Croatia Zagreb won 3–1 on aggregate.

12 August 1998
20:15

Maribor (Slovenia)	2–1	(Netherlands) PSV Eindhoven
Filipović 12'; Breznik 84'	Report	Marcos 61'

Ljudski vrt, Maribor
Attendance: 5,000
Referee: Anders Frisk (Sweden)
26 August 1998
20:00

PSV Eindhoven (Netherlands)	4–1 (a.e.t.)	(Slovenia) Maribor
Van Nistelrooy 8'; Bruggink 69'; Rommedahl 100'; De Bilde 102'	Report	Filipović 5'

Philips Stadion, Eindhoven
Attendance: 11,500
Referee: Graham Poll (England)

PSV Eindhoven won 5–3 on aggregate.

12 August 1998
20:00

Dynamo Kyiv (Ukraine)	0–1	(Czech Republic) Sparta Prague
	Report	Baranek 5'

Dynamo Stadium, Kyiv
Attendance: 15,000
Referee: Bernd Heynemann (Germany)
26 August 1998
20:15

Sparta Prague (Czech Republic)	0–1 (a.e.t.)	(Ukraine) Dynamo Kyiv
	Report	Gabriel 88' (o.g.)
Penalties
Čížek (penalty scored); Votava (penalty missed); Stracený (penalty missed); Baranek (penalty missed)	1–3	(penalty scored) Rebrov; (penalty scored) Kaladze; (penalty missed) Shevchenko; (penalty missed) Konovalov; (penalty scored) Dmytrulin

Stadion Letná, Prague
Attendance: 17,998
Referee: Gilles Veissière (France)

1–1 on aggregate; Dynamo Kyiv won 3–1 on penalties.

12 August 1998
19:00

Košice (Slovakia)	0–2	(Denmark) Brøndby
	Report	Daugaard 54'; Thygesen 85'

Všešportový areál, Košice
Attendance: 4,725
Referee: Manuel Díaz Vega (Spain)
26 August 1998
20:10

Brøndby (Denmark)	0–1	(Slovakia) Košice
	Report	Lapsansky 39'

Parken, Copenhagen
Attendance: 16,962
Referee: Michel Piraux (Belgium)

Brøndby won 2–1 on aggregate.

12 August 1998
20:45

Internazionale (Italy)	4–0	(Latvia) Skonto
Zamorano 4'; Simeone 10'; Ventola 20'; Baggio 59'	Report

Arena Garibaldi, Pisa (Note: Played at Arena Garibaldi in Pisa because Internazionale were temporarily banned from playing at their San Siro stadium in Milan.)
Attendance: 16,166
Referee: Fritz Stuchlik (Austria)
26 August 1998
21:00

Skonto (Latvia)	1–3	(Italy) Internazionale
Miholaps 21'	Report	Zamorano 6'; Galante 53'; Djorkaeff 69'

Daugava Stadium, Riga
Attendance: 6,500
Referee: Giorgos Bikas (Greece)

Internazionale won 7–1 on aggregate.

12 August 1998
21:30

Olympiacos (Greece)	2–1	(Cyprus) Anorthosis Famagusta
Giannakopoulos 11'; Luciano 32'	Report	Mihajlović 64'

Olympic Stadium, Athens
Attendance: 28,047
Referee: René Temmink (Netherlands)
26 August 1998

Anorthosis Famagusta (Cyprus)	2–4	(Greece) Olympiacos
Mihajlović 39'; Krčmarević 80'	Report	Georgatos 48'; Đorđević 60', 87'; Gogić 90'

Antonis Papadopoulos Stadium, Larnaca
Attendance: 6,380
Referee: Miroslav Radoman (FR Yugoslavia)

Olympiacos won 6–3 on aggregate.

12 August 1998
21:00

Benfica (Portugal)	6–0	(Israel) Beitar Jerusalem
Pembridge 25', 82'; Deane 29'; Calado 64' (pen.); Schelach 79' (o.g.); Nuno Gomes 85' (pen.)	Report

Estádio da Luz, Lisbon
Attendance: 55,000
Referee: Edgar Steinborn (Germany)
26 August 1998
18:00

Beitar Jerusalem (Israel)	4–2	(Portugal) Benfica
Hamar 24'; Sallói 26' (pen.); Shitrit 51'; Abukasis 79'	Report	Nuno Gomes 17' (pen.); João Pinto 90+2'

Teddy Stadium, Jerusalem
Attendance: 1,290
Referee: Ryszard Wójcik (Poland)

Benfica won 8–4 on aggregate.

12 August 1998
20:00

Dinamo Tbilisi (Georgia (country))	2–1	(Spain) Athletic Bilbao
Khomeriki 15'; Tskitishvili 30'	Report	Imaz 46'

Boris Paichadze National Stadium, Tbilisi
Attendance: 12,500
Referee: Rune Pedersen (Norway)
26 August 1998
20:30

Athletic Bilbao (Spain)	1–0	(Georgia (country)) Dinamo Tbilisi
Etxeberria 52'	Report

San Mamés, Bilbao
Attendance: 34,600
Referee: László Vágner (Hungary)

2–2 on aggregate; Athletic Bilbao won on away goals.

12 August 1998
19:00

HJK (Finland)	1–0	(France) Metz
Strasser 71' (o.g.)	Report

Olympic Stadium, Helsinki
Attendance: 8,287
Referee: Roelof Luinge (Netherlands)
26 August 1998
20:00

Metz (France)	1–1	(Finland) HJK
Meyrieu 78' (pen.)	Report	Vasara 68'

Stade Saint-Symphorien, Metz
Attendance: 11,922
Referee: William Young (Scotland)

HJK won 2–1 on aggregate.

12 August 1998
20:30

Bayern Munich (Germany)	4–0	(Federal Republic of Yugoslavia) Obilić
Effenberg 59'; Élber 63'; Zickler 64'; Fink 76'	Report

Olympiastadion, Munich
Attendance: 37,000
Referee: Terje Hauge (Norway)
26 August 1998
20:30

Obilić (Federal Republic of Yugoslavia)	1–1	(Germany) Bayern Munich
Šarac 67'	Report	Matthäus 88'

Partizan Stadium, Belgrade (Note: This match was played at FK Partizan's Partizan Stadium in Belgrade because Obilić's Miloš Obilić Stadium in Belgrade did not meet UEFA standards.)
Attendance: 8,500
Referee: Antonio López Nieto (Spain)

Bayern Munich won 5–1 on aggregate.

12 August 1998
20:30

Sturm Graz (Austria)	4–0	(Hungary) Újpest
Vastić 6', 70'; Neukirchner 81'; Haas 88'	Report

Stadion Graz-Liebenau, Graz
Attendance: 10,323
Referee: Robert Boggi (Italy)
26 August 1998
20:30

Újpest (Hungary)	2–3	(Austria) Sturm Graz
Kovács 36'; Jenei 72'	Report	Haas 8'; Reinmayr 49', 55'

Ferenc Szusza Stadium, Budapest
Attendance: 2,350
Referee: Arturo Dauden Ibáñez (Spain)

Sturm Graz won 7–2 on aggregate.

12 August 1998
20:45

Steaua București (Romania)	2–2	(Greece) Panathinaikos
Șerban 10'; Szekely 76'	Report	Asanović 6'; Liberopoulos 68'

Stadionul Steaua, Bucharest
Attendance: 9,800
Referee: Piero Ceccarini (Italy)
26 August 1998
21:00

Panathinaikos (Greece)	6–3	(Romania) Steaua București
Milojević 8' (pen.); Lincar 28'; Liberopoulos 34'; Warzycha 58', 66'; Asanović 87'	Report	Răchită 12', 16'; Belodedici 60'

Olympic Stadium, Athens
Attendance: 52,529
Referee: Mario van der Ende (Netherlands)

Panathinaikos won 8–5 on aggregate.
