= Dragoljub Acković =

Serbian writer, academic, activist and politician (1952–2025)

Dragoljub Acković (Serbian Cyrillic: Драгољуб Ацковић; 23 November 1952 – 27 June 2025) was a Serbian writer, academic, activist and politician. He was a prominent member of the Roma community in Serbia and wrote extensively on the history and identity of the Roma people. Acković served in the National Assembly of Serbia from 2020 to 2024 as a member of the Serbian Progressive Party (SNS).

== Early life and academic career ==
Acković was born in the village of Osipaonica, Smederevo, in what was then the People's Republic of Serbia in the Federal People's Republic of Yugoslavia. He attained university degrees in political science and ethnology from the Faculty of Philosophy, took post-graduate studies at the Faculty of Law, and received a doctorate in Romological studies from the United Nations University for Peace.

== Author and community activist ==
Acković penned more than twenty books and several hundred articles on the subject of the Roma community. His book The Roma in Belgrade focuses on the history of the Roma community in Serbia's capital; he notes that the Roma have lived in the city since at least 1328 and contends that for many centuries there was no hostility between the Serb and Roma communities. The work also addresses contemporary discrimination against the Roma community and argues for improved access to education as a means of breaking down modern prejudices.

He joined the Association of Writers of Serbia in 1997 and was a member of the Commission for the Study of Roma Life and Customs in the Serbian Academy of Sciences and Arts. From September 2011 until his death, he acted as deputy president of the International Roma Academy of Arts and Sciences. He was also a member of the National Committee for Intangible Culture Heritage in the Serbian ministry of culture, information, and informational society, and for over twenty years he worked as editor for the Roma programming at Radio Belgrade. He was the founder and director of the museum of Roma culture in Belgrade and of the radio station Khrlo e Romengo and started numerous other media initiatives in the Romani language.

In September 2012, he became deputy director of Serbia's office for human and minority rights. In 2020, he was involved in efforts to reduce the spread of COVID-19 among members of the Roma community.

Acković became a member of the International Commission for the Truth About Jasenovac in 2007. Three years later, he became president of Milan Bulajić's Genocide Research Fund. In 2018, he curated an exhibition entitled, "Suffering of Roma in the First World War" at the Museum of Vojvodina.

== Politician and representative ==
=== Roma political organizations ===
Acković was the first president of the Roma Congress Party. He was active in the World Romani Congress from its third convention in 1981 and was elected its president in April 2013. In this capacity, he condemned increasing attacks on Roma people in Europe and around the world.

He also served on Serbia's Roma National Council. He led his own electoral list in the 2014 council elections and was elected when the list won two out of thirty-five seats. He did not seek re-election in 2018.

=== Serbia ===
Acković was a Social Democracy candidate for the national assembly of Serbia in the 1997 Serbian parliamentary election, appearing in second place on the party's electoral list in Čukarica. The list did not win any seats in the division. This was the last Serbian parliamentary election where the country was divided into separate electoral constituencies.

Acković encouraged Roma people in Kosovo to support the Serb Civic Initiative in the 2013 Kosovan local elections.

He was given the 191st position on the Progressive Party's Let's Get Serbia Moving list in the 2012 Serbian parliamentary election. The list won seventy-three mandates, and he was not elected.

==== Parliamentarian ====
Acković received the 165th position on the SNS's For Our Children party list in the 2020 Serbian parliamentary election and was elected when the list won a landslide majority with 188 out of 250 seats. In his first assembly term, Acković was deputy chair of the assembly committee on human and minority rights and gender equality, as well as chair of a subcommittee for Roma affairs and a member of the committee's working group for initiatives, petitions, and proposals. He was also a member of the labour committee, (Note: Formally known as the Committee on Labour, Social Issues, Social Inclusion, and Poverty Reduction.) Serbia's delegation to the parliamentary assembly of the Francophonie, and Serbia's parliamentary friendship groups with France, India, and Russia.

He was promoted to the 105th position on the SNS's list in the 2022 Serbian parliamentary election and was re-elected when the list won a plurality victory with 120 seats. In his second term, he was a member of the committee on human and minority rights and gender equality, once again a member of Serbia's delegation to the parliamentary assembly of the Francophonie, and the head of Serbia's parliamentary friendship group with Bangladesh.

In the 2023 parliamentary election, he appeared in the 156th position on the SNS list and was not re-elected when the party won 129 seats. His term ended when the new assembly convened in February 2024.

== Death ==
Acković died on 27 June 2025, at the age of 72.
