= Vasović =

Vasović (Serbian Cyrillic: Васовић) is a Serbian surname, derived from the male given name Vaso, a diminutive of Vasilije (Basil).

== Geographical distribution ==
As of 2014, 82.0% of all known bearers of the surname Vasović were residents of Serbia (frequency 1:2,337), 8.9% of Montenegro (1:1,889), 4.5% of Kosovo (1:11,083), 1.9% of Bosnia and Herzegovina (1:50,510), 1.6% of Croatia (1:72,908) and 1.2% of the Republic of Macedonia (1:48,671).

In Serbia, the frequency of the surname was higher than national average (1:2,337) in the following districts:

1. Moravica District (1:243)
2. Šumadija District (1:697)
3. Raška District (1:818)
4. Zlatibor District (1:1,053)
5. West Bačka District (1:2,095)

== People ==
- Jugoslav Vasović (born 1974), Serbian water polo player
- Velibor Vasović (1939–2002), Serbian footballer and manager

== See also ==
- Vasić
- Vasojević
- Vasiljević
