= Aleksandar Vasić =

Aleksandar Vasić may refer to:

- Aleksandar Vasić (basketball) (born 1987), Serbian basketball player
- Aleksandar Vasić (politician), deputy chairman of the State Broadcasting Agency Council in the Republic of Serbia
