= 1999 UEFA Champions League final =

Association football match

- Match programme cover
- Event: 1998–99 UEFA Champions League
Manchester United	Bayern Munich
(England)	(Germany)
2	1
- Date: 26 May 1999
- Venue: Camp Nou, Barcelona
- Referee: Pierluigi Collina (Italy)
- Attendance: 90,245
- Weather: Clear; 21 °C (70 °F); 64% humidity

The 1999 UEFA Champions League final was an association football match between Manchester United of England and Bayern Munich of Germany, played at Camp Nou in Barcelona, Spain, on 26 May 1999, to determine the winner of the 1998–99 UEFA Champions League. Injury time goals from Manchester United's Teddy Sheringham and Ole Gunnar Solskjær cancelled out Mario Basler's early goal for Bayern to give Manchester United a 2–1 win and their first European Cup title since 1968, their second overall. Referee Pierluigi Collina has cited this match as one of the most memorable of his career, and described the noise from the crowd at the end of the game as being like a "lion's roar".

The two sides had played each other earlier in the competition, having both been drawn in Group D in the group stage; Bayern won the group, while Manchester United qualified for the knockout phase as one of the two best runners-up across all six groups. After beating Inter Milan in the quarter-finals, Manchester United beat another Italian side, Juventus, in the semis to reach the final; meanwhile, Bayern beat fellow Germans 1. FC Kaiserslautern in the quarter-finals, before overcoming Ukrainian side Dynamo Kyiv in the semis. The victory completed a treble-winning season for Manchester United, having already secured the Premier League and FA Cup titles in the preceding 10 days. Bayern were also playing for a treble, having won the Bundesliga and reached the DFB-Pokal final, although they went on to lose that match as well to Werder Bremen on penalties. It has been widely regarded as one of the greatest finals in the history of the tournament.

== Background ==
Manchester United and Bayern Munich had only met twice in competitive matches before the final, both meetings coming earlier in the 1998–99 season and both finished as draws. Manchester United's only other German opponents in their history were Borussia Dortmund, against whom they had an overall winning record, with three wins, two defeats and a draw in their six matches, including a 10–1 aggregate win in the second round of the 1964–65 Inter-Cities Fairs Cup and a 2–0 aggregate defeat in the 1996–97 UEFA Champions League semi-finals. Bayern Munich had an equally narrow advantage in their 22 matches against English opposition, with seven wins, nine draws and six defeats, including a win over Leeds United in the 1975 European Cup final and a defeat to Aston Villa in the 1982 final.

Including the victory over Leeds in 1975, Bayern Munich had won the European Cup on three occasions going into the 1999 final. With three victories in a row from 1974 to 1976, they became only the third team to achieve such a feat after Real Madrid (1956 to 1960) and Ajax (1971 to 1973). They had also finished as runners-up twice: in 1982 against Aston Villa and 1987 against Porto. Although Bayern had been waiting 23 years for a European Cup title, Manchester United had had to wait even longer, as their only victory had come in 1968 against Benfica at Wembley in extra time. Their manager then was Matt Busby, who had been seriously injured 10 years earlier in the Munich air disaster, which killed eight of his players on the way back from a European Cup tie in Belgrade, before rebuilding the team to become European Cup winners. Busby died in 1994; the day of the 1999 Champions League final would have been his 90th birthday.

Although it was the second Champions League season to feature clubs that had not won their national leagues the year before, Manchester United and Bayern Munich were the first such clubs to reach the final of the competition. Nevertheless, both went into the match as champions, having won their domestic leagues in 1998–99; Bayern Munich claimed the Bundesliga title with a 1–1 draw against Hertha BSC on 9 May with three games to go, while Manchester United left it until the last day of the season (16 May), when they came back from 1–0 down against Tottenham Hotspur to win 2–1 and beat Arsenal to the title by a point. Both teams were also playing for the treble; in addition to their league win, Manchester United had beaten Newcastle United in the 1999 FA Cup Final on 22 May to claim the Double, while Bayern were due to play Werder Bremen in the 1999 DFB-Pokal Final on 12 June.

== Route to the final ==
(England) Manchester United				Round	(Germany) Bayern Munich			
Opponent	Agg.	1st leg	2nd leg	Qualifying round	Opponent	Agg.	1st leg	2nd leg
(Poland) ŁKS Łódź	2–0	2–0 (H)	0–0 (A)	Second qualifying round	(Federal Republic of Yugoslavia) Obilić	5–1	4–0 (H)	1–1 (A)
Opponent	Result			Group stage	Opponent	Result		
(Spain) Barcelona	3–3 (H)			Matchday 1	(Denmark) Brøndby	1–2 (A)		
(Germany) Bayern Munich	2–2 (A)			Matchday 2	(England) Manchester United	2–2 (H)		
(Denmark) Brøndby	6–2 (A)			Matchday 3	(Spain) Barcelona	1–0 (H)		
(Denmark) Brøndby	5–0 (H)			Matchday 4	(Spain) Barcelona	2–1 (A)		
(Spain) Barcelona	3–3 (A)			Matchday 5	(Denmark) Brøndby	2–0 (H)		
(Germany) Bayern Munich	1–1 (H)			Matchday 6	(England) Manchester United	1–1 (A)		
Group D runners-up: Pos / Team / Pld / Pts; 1 / (Germany) Bayern Munich / 6 / 11; 2 / (England) Manchester United / 6 / 10; 3 / (Spain) Barcelona / 6 / 8; 4 / (Denmark) Brøndby / 6 / 3; Source: UEFA				Final standings	Group D winners: Pos / Team / Pld / Pts; 1 / (Germany) Bayern Munich / 6 / 11; 2 / (England) Manchester United / 6 / 10; 3 / (Spain) Barcelona / 6 / 8; 4 / (Denmark) Brøndby / 6 / 3; Source: UEFA			
Opponent	Agg.	1st leg	2nd leg	Knockout stage	Opponent	Agg.	1st leg	2nd leg
(Italy) Inter Milan	3–1	2–0 (H)	1–1 (A)	Quarter-finals	(Germany) 1. FC Kaiserslautern	6–0	2–0 (H)	4–0 (A)
(Italy) Juventus	4–3	1–1 (H)	3–2 (A)	Semi-finals	(Ukraine) Dynamo Kyiv	4–3	3–3 (A)	1–0 (H)

=== Qualifying round ===
Since neither Manchester United nor Bayern Munich had won their respective leagues in 1997–98, both sides faced a qualifier to enter the 1998–99 Champions League. Manchester United were drawn against Polish champions ŁKS Łódź and won 2–0 on aggregate, goals from Ryan Giggs and Andy Cole in the first leg at Old Trafford giving them the victory. Bayern Munich had an easier time against Yugoslavian champions Obilić, winning 4–0 in the first leg at the Olympiastadion with goals from Stefan Effenberg, Giovane Élber, Alexander Zickler and Thorsten Fink, all scored in the space of 17 second-half minutes. In the second leg, played at Partizan's ground in Belgrade, an 88th-minute goal from Lothar Matthäus rescued a 1–1 draw to give Bayern a 5–1 win on aggregate.

=== Group stage ===
In the draw for the group stage, Bayern Munich were placed in Pot 2 and Manchester United in Pot 3 as Germany was higher than England in the UEFA association club coefficient rankings. They were drawn together in Group D, along with Spanish champions Barcelona and Danish champions Brøndby, in what became known as the "group of death". United and Bayern found themselves bottom of the group after the first round of matches, in which Bayern lost 2–1 away to Brøndby after surrendering a 1–0 lead in the last three minutes; United, meanwhile, played out a 3–3 draw at home to Barcelona after twice giving up the lead. The first group stage meeting between United and Bayern took place at the Olympiastadion on matchday 2 and finished in a 2–2 draw; Élber opened the scoring for Bayern before goals from Dwight Yorke and Paul Scholes gave United the lead, only for a Teddy Sheringham own goal – brought about by an error by Peter Schmeichel – to level the scores in the 89th minute.

Matchdays 3 and 4 saw double-headers, with Manchester United taking on Brøndby and Bayern Munich playing Barcelona. Manchester United beat Brøndby 6–2 in their first match at Parken Stadium in Copenhagen, then 5–0 at Old Trafford two weeks later. Bayern also recorded a pair of victories over Barcelona, winning 1–0 at the Olympiastadion and 2–1 at the Camp Nou. On matchday 5, United played their second match against Barcelona – their first trip of the season to the Camp Nou – and again the two sides played out a 3–3 draw. With Bayern beating Brøndby 2–0 at home, the German side moved onto 10 points and took top spot in the group going into the final round of matches, one point ahead of United. Qualification for the quarter-finals was only guaranteed for the group winners, meaning that both United and Bayern had to play for victory in their final match against each other at Old Trafford. United took the lead just before half-time through a Roy Keane strike from just outside the penalty area; however, Hasan Salihamidžić equalised for Bayern in the 55th minute and the game finished as a 1–1 draw. The result meant that Bayern finished as group winners, but United's 10 points from their six matches was enough to see them go through as one of the two group runners-up with the best record.

=== Knockout stage ===
In the quarter-finals, Bayern Munich were drawn against Group F winners and fellow German side 1. FC Kaiserslautern, while Manchester United were paired with Group C winners Inter Milan. Two Yorke goals gave United a 2–0 win in their first leg at Old Trafford, while Bayern beat Kaiserslautern by the same scoreline at the Olympiastadion through goals from Élber and Effenberg. In the second leg, Nicola Ventola pulled a goal back for Inter, but Paul Scholes secured United's passage to the semi-finals with a late away goal. Meanwhile, Bayern won convincingly at Kaiserslautern, as goals from Effenberg, Carsten Jancker, Mario Basler and an own goal from Uwe Rösler gave them a 4–0 win, 6–0 on aggregate.

United again came up against Italian opposition in the semi-finals, facing Juventus, who had beaten Greek side Olympiacos in the quarters, and Bayern were drawn against Ukrainian side Dynamo Kyiv, who beat reigning champions Real Madrid to reach the semis. Both first legs finished as draws; Giggs scored in injury time to secure a 1–1 home draw for Manchester United after Antonio Conte had put Juventus ahead midway through the first half, while Bayern also had to come from behind to draw 3–3 in Kyiv. A single goal from Basler proved the difference between Bayern and Dynamo in the second leg, giving the Germans a 4–3 aggregate win. Manchester United fell behind early in the second leg in Turin, as Filippo Inzaghi scored twice in the first 11 minutes. Goals from Keane and Yorke before half-time levelled the tie but gave United the advantage on away goals, before Cole secured victory with the winning goal seven minutes from the end of the match.

== Pre-match ==
=== Venue and ticketing ===
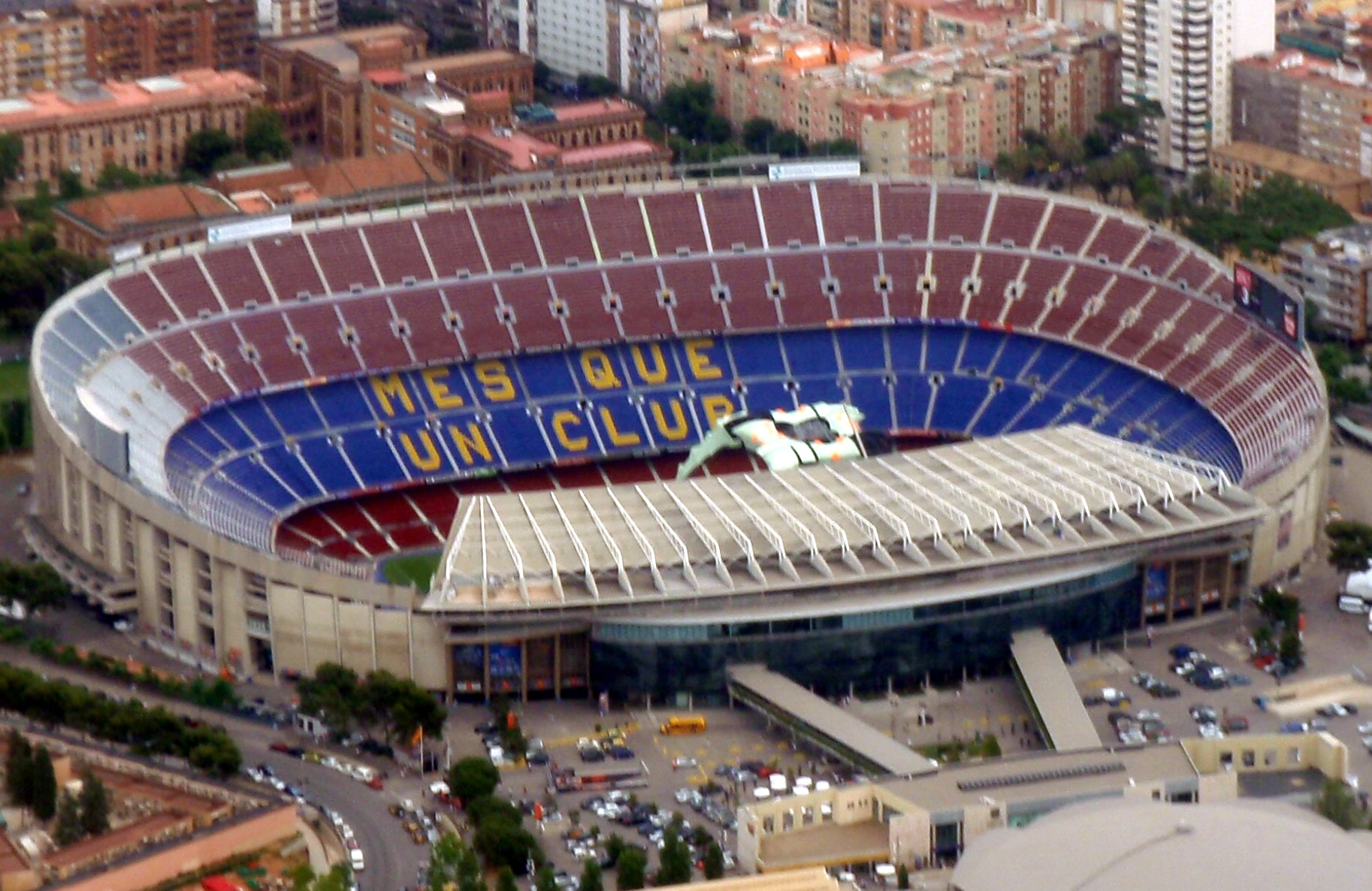
The capacity of the Camp Nou stadium was reduced from over 100,000 to 92,000 for the final.

The Camp Nou stadium in Barcelona, Spain, was selected as the venue for the final at a meeting of the UEFA Executive Committee in Lisbon, Portugal, on 6 October 1998. The selection process had begun more than four months earlier, in May 1998, when FC Barcelona submitted the Camp Nou as a contender to host the match in recognition of the club's centenary year. The other venues in contention to host the match were London's Wembley Stadium and Marseille's Stade Vélodrome, but the Camp Nou was considered by UEFA's Stadiums Commission to be the favourite for its superior security, comfort and capacity. The Camp Nou had hosted one previous European Cup final: Italian club Milan's 4–0 victory over Steaua București of Romania in 1989. It had also hosted two Cup Winners' Cup finals, in 1972 and 1982; the latter was won on home turf by Barcelona.

The Camp Nou was constructed over three years from 1954 to 1957 as a replacement for Barcelona's previous home, the nearby Camp de Les Corts. The original capacity of the Camp Nou was just over 93,000, but its first major European final, the 1972 Cup Winners' Cup Final, was attended by just 35,000 spectators. 1982 was the stadium's busiest year to date, hosting not only the 1982 Cup Winners' Cup Final, but also five matches at the FIFA World Cup, including the opening match, all three matches in Group A of the second group stage and the semi-final between Poland and Italy. Subsequent renovations meant that by 1999, the stadium's capacity had reached 115,000.

Due to UEFA regulations regarding standing at football matches, the Camp Nou's terraced sections were closed for the 1999 Champions League final, reducing the capacity to approximately 92,000. Of these, around two-thirds were reserved for the two finalist clubs (approximately 30,000 tickets each). The remaining third was divided between fans of FC Barcelona (around 7,500 tickets), UEFA, and competition sponsors. After an initial announcement that the clubs would only receive 25,000 tickets each, the Independent Manchester United Supporters Association (IMUSA) called that figure "ridiculous", claiming it would push black market prices to "astronomical levels"; the group's spokesman, Lee Hodgkiss, suggested a figure closer to 50,000 would be more appropriate, given the stadium's usual capacity of around 115,000. Despite the club receiving only 30,000 tickets, it was estimated that up to 100,000 Manchester United fans travelled to Barcelona for the final, paying around £300 for flights and around £1,000 for match tickets. Many were able to buy tickets from touts, who had paid up to £400 to buy from Barcelona fans who had bought through their club for the equivalent of £28.

As well as reducing the capacity of the stadium, UEFA also mandated that the Camp Nou pitch be narrowed by 4 metres (13 ft) from 72 metres (236 ft) to 68 metres (223 ft), to match UEFA's 'standard' pitch size.

=== Match officials ===
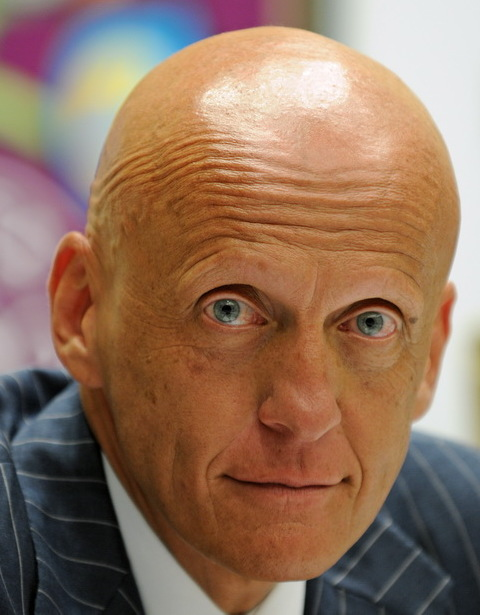
Pierluigi Collina was the referee for the match.

The match referee was Pierluigi Collina of the Italian Football Federation. Collina was promoted to the FIFA International Referees list in 1995, and took charge of his first UEFA Cup matches in the 1995–96 season. He had only refereed eight Champions League matches before the 1999 final, three of which came in the group stage earlier in the season, including the match between Barcelona and Bayern Munich at the Camp Nou on 4 November 1998; however, he had also taken charge of four matches at the 1996 Summer Olympics, including the final between Nigeria and Argentina, and two group stage matches at the 1998 FIFA World Cup. Collina was supported by fellow Italian officials Gennaro Mazzei and Claudio Puglisi as assistant referees, and fourth official Fiorenzo Treossi.

=== Match ball ===
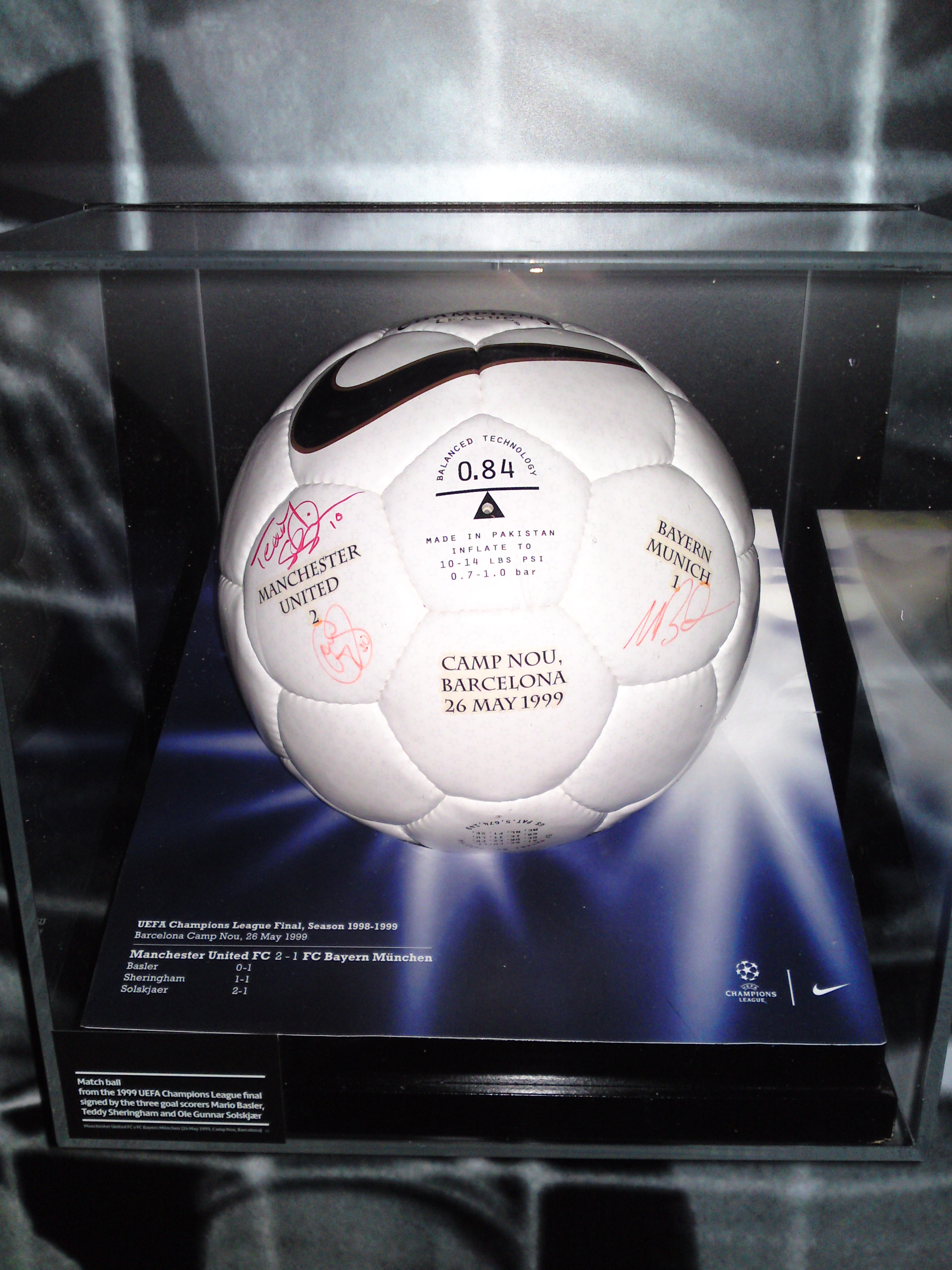
One of the Nike NK 800 Geo balls used for the final

The match ball for the final was the Nike NK 800 Geo, a white ball with a standard 32-panel design. It featured a large "swoosh" across two adjacent hexagonal panels with the Champions League logo on a pentagonal panel above, and a pattern of five-pointed stars similar to those used in the UEFA Champions League logo over the entire surface of the ball.

=== Kits ===
As both Manchester United and Bayern Munich's primary kits featured significant amounts of red, UEFA regulations about kit clashes would normally have required both teams to wear their change kits. However, the two clubs felt it would have been a shame for neither to wear their traditional colours, and they agreed to toss a coin to see who would have first choice. Manchester United won the toss and therefore wore their usual European colours of red shirts, white shorts and white socks, while Bayern wore silver shirts, shorts and socks, all with maroon trim.

=== Opening ceremony ===
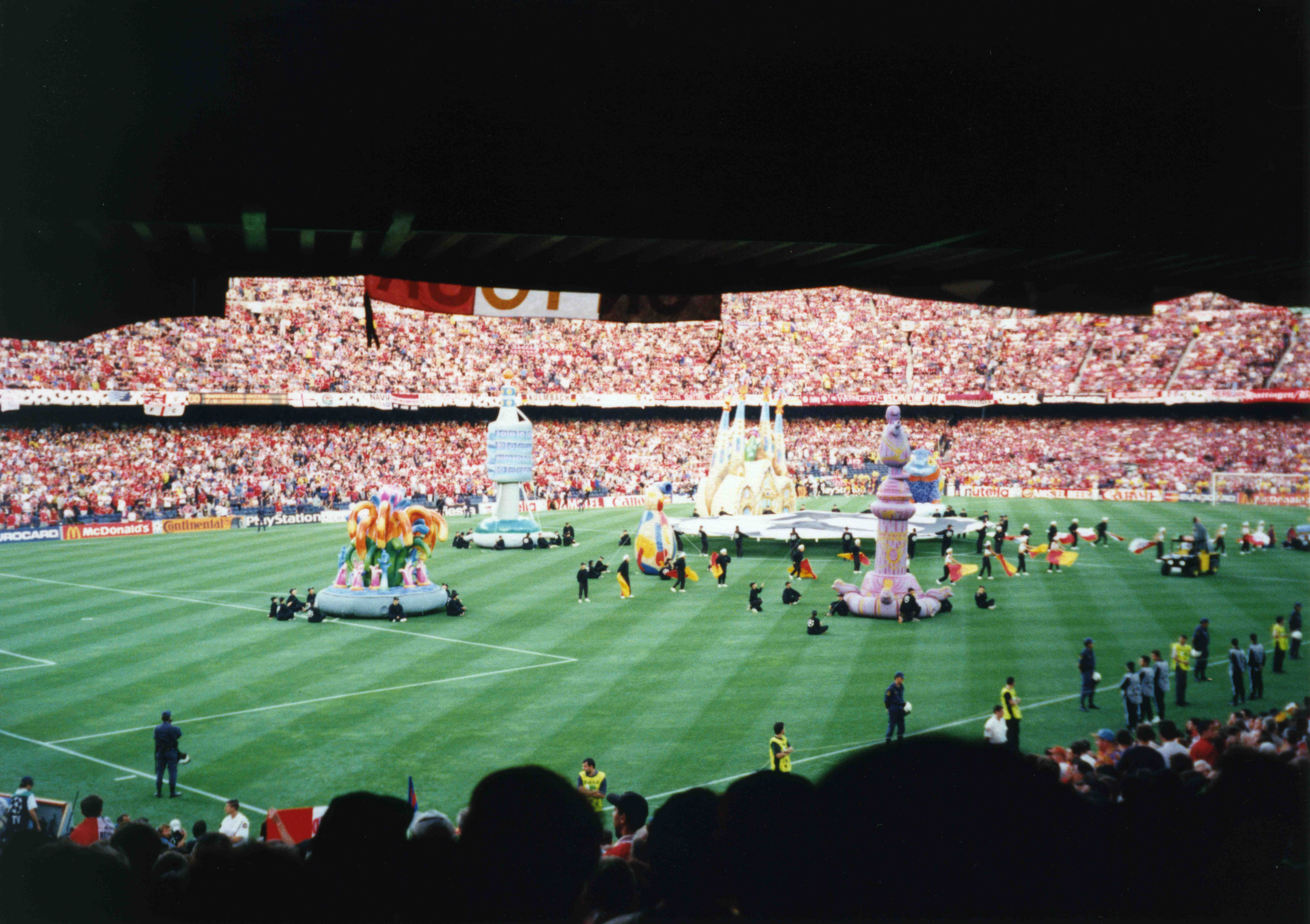
The opening ceremony featured inflatable versions of recognisable Barcelona landmarks.

Before kick-off, opera singer Montserrat Caballé – moving around the field on the back of a golf cart – performed a live version of "Barcelona", a song she recorded with the late Queen lead singer Freddie Mercury in 1987, accompanied by a recording of Mercury on the stadium's electronic screen. The opening ceremony featured inflatable versions of some of Barcelona's most recognisable landmarks, as well as flag-bearers waving flags of the crests of the participating teams. Bayern Munich's fans, meanwhile, created a tifo of the name of their team with thousands of coloured cards.

== Match ==
=== Team selection ===
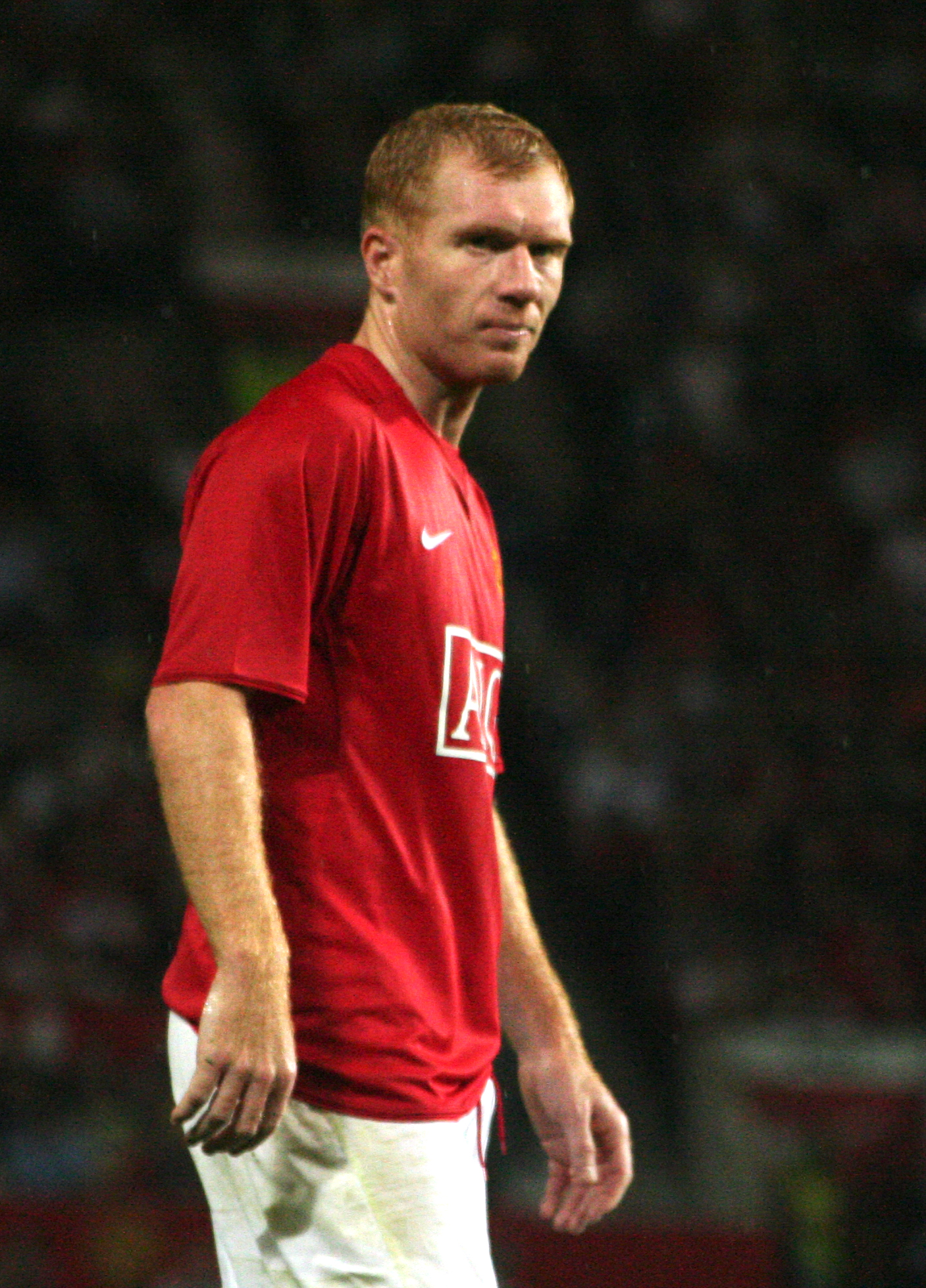
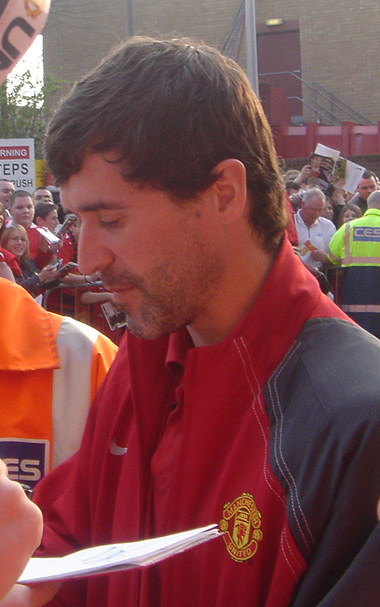
Midfielders Paul Scholes (left) and Roy Keane were both suspended for the final.

Manchester United left England two days before the final, first flying from Manchester Ringway Airport to Heathrow, where they boarded a Concorde aircraft for the flight to Barcelona. They stayed in the Meliá Gran hotel in the town of Sitges, about 20 miles (32 kilometres) down the coast south-west of Barcelona. Captain Roy Keane and midfielder Paul Scholes both missed out on the final due to suspension; manager Alex Ferguson had originally considered selecting Giggs to join Nicky Butt in central midfield, but ultimately picked David Beckham as a player who could help the team control possession in the middle of the pitch, with Giggs on the right wing and Jesper Blomqvist starting on the left. Keane had suffered an ankle injury in the FA Cup final that would keep him out until the start of the following season, but his suspension rendered the injury irrelevant to his selection. Norwegian defender Henning Berg also missed out through injury, meaning that his compatriot Ronny Johnsen—who had been an early contender to play alongside Butt in midfield—played in central defence alongside Jaap Stam, who overcame an Achilles injury. With Keane out, goalkeeper Schmeichel—who in November 1998 had announced his intention to leave Manchester United at the end of the season—was named as captain for his final Manchester United appearance; this meant that both sides were captained by their goalkeepers, as Oliver Kahn wore the armband for Bayern. As Manchester United's top two goalscorers throughout the season, Cole and Yorke started up front, leaving Sheringham—who had played a part in both goals in the FA Cup Final a few days earlier—on the bench. Also on the bench were fellow striker Ole Gunnar Solskjær, back-up goalkeeper Raimond van der Gouw, defenders David May, Phil Neville and Wes Brown, and midfielder Jonathan Greening.

Bayern coach Ottmar Hitzfeld announced his team's line-up for the final two full days ahead of the match. Injuries also impacted on his selections, with French left-back Bixente Lizarazu and Brazilian forward Élber having suffered season-ending knee injuries. Élber's absence resulted in Bayern playing a three-man attack of Basler, Jancker and Zickler, while Lizarazu was replaced on the left flank by Michael Tarnat playing in a wing-back role opposite Markus Babbel on the right. Babbel was originally intended to play a man-marking role on Giggs, with his defensive abilities earning him selection ahead of the more attack-minded Thomas Strunz; however, this was nullified by Giggs' selection on the right wing, where he would play against Tarnat. The Bayern defence was anchored around sweeper Matthäus, who played behind Thomas Linke and Ghana international Samuel Kuffour – the only non-German in the Bayern side (by comparison, Manchester United had four Englishmen in their team); Linke and Kuffour's partnership at centre-back meant club captain Thomas Helmer had to settle for a place on the bench. Effenberg and Jens Jeremies played in central midfield for Bayern, with Jeremies man-marking Beckham.

=== Summary ===
==== First half ====
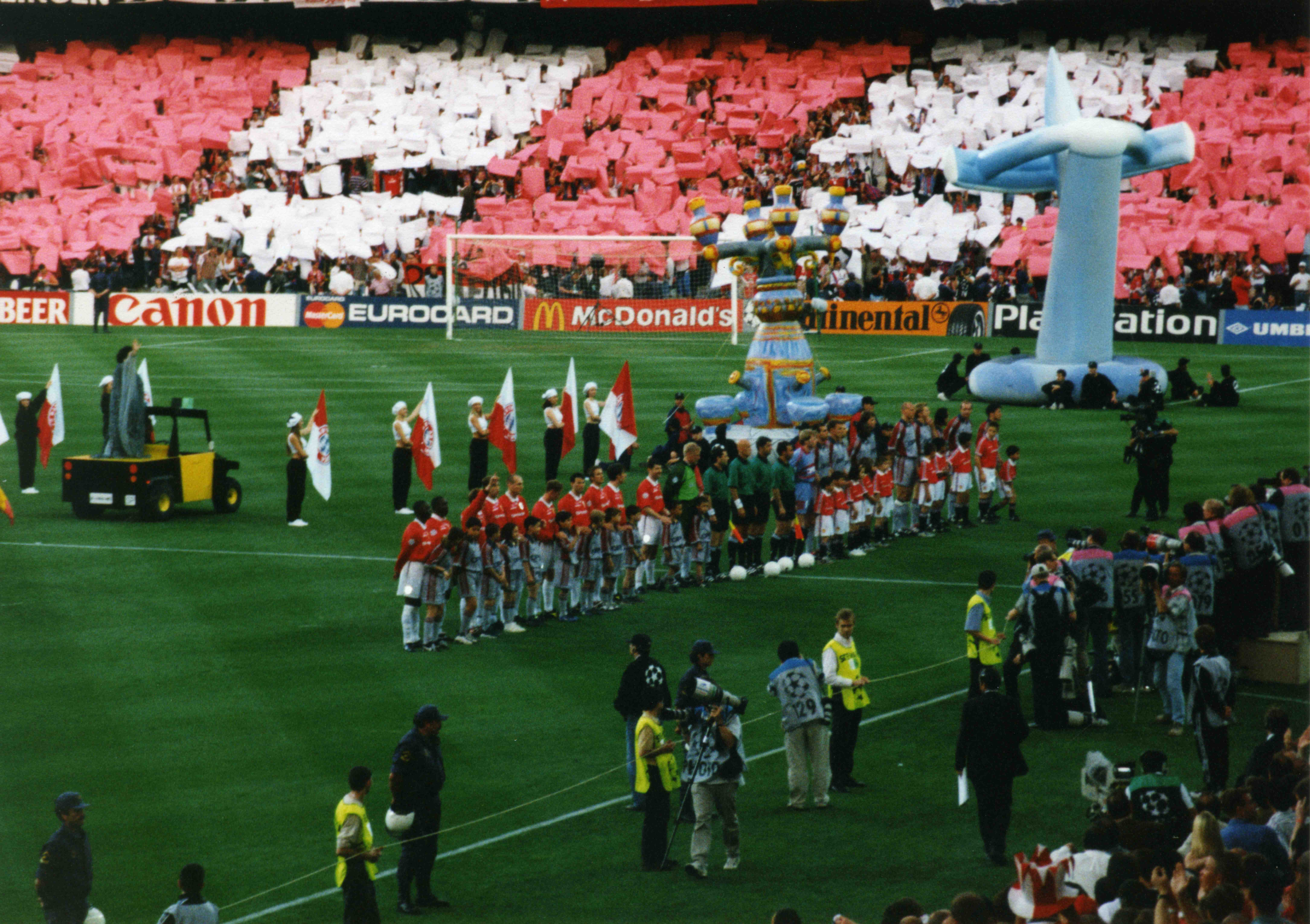
The teams line up ahead of kick-off.

Six minutes into the match, Johnsen fouled Bayern striker Jancker just outside the area, and Basler placed a low free kick around the United wall to score the first goal, as Schmeichel was caught flat-footed. Although they were now a goal down, United began to dominate possession, but failed to create any clear-cut chances. The Bayern defence remained strong and well-organised, as Cole found out when his close-range effort was quickly closed down by three defenders. As Bayern began to look increasingly dangerous on the counter-attack than their opponents did in possession, Jancker repeatedly tested the United back four with a number of clever runs, some of which were flagged offside.

Cole once again found himself with a chance in the Bayern box, but goalkeeper Kahn hurried out of his goal to punch the ball to safety. At the other end, Basler came close with another free kick before Zickler sent a shot just wide from the edge of the box. As half-time approached, United winger Giggs, playing out of position on the right, sent a weak header towards Kahn from a Cole cross, but that was as close as they were to come to a goal in the first half.

==== Second half ====
The German team started the second half in a more positive mood, with Jancker forcing a save from Schmeichel within a minute after the restart. Basler was proving to be Bayern's most dangerous player, first firing a 30-yard shot towards goal and then setting up a header for Babbel, who missed the ball entirely. United put together an attack when, after a healthy period of possession, Giggs crossed towards Blomqvist, who could only knock the ball over the bar after a desperate stretch. Another chance for Basler prompted Ferguson to bring on Sheringham for Blomqvist which resulted in a return to the more common formation of Giggs on the left (having started right-wing), with Beckham moving from an uncommon central to his more familiar right midfield position. Yorke dropped further back into a central midfield position. Hitzfeld responded with a substitution of his own, bringing on Mehmet Scholl, who immediately set up Effenberg for a long-range shot that went narrowly wide. Schmeichel kept his side in the game when tipping another Effenberg shot over the bar after 75 minutes. Scholl then almost scored from a delicate 20-yard chip after a run from Basler, but the ball bounced back off the post and into Schmeichel's arms. With the game seemingly drifting away from the English side, Ferguson introduced Solskjær to replace Cole with 10 minutes remaining. The substitute immediately forced Kahn into a diving save with a header; it was the closest United had come to scoring all game. A minute later, Bayern missed a chance to secure the trophy, when an overhead kick from Jancker came off the crossbar. As the game crept into the last five minutes, United's two substitutes forced Kahn into more saves, firstly through a Sheringham volley and then from another Solskjær header.

===== Injury time =====
Beckham, in towards Schmeichel. It's come for Dwight Yorke. Cleared... Giggs with the shot, Sheringham! Name on the trophy! Teddy Sheringham, with 30 seconds of added time played, has equalised for Manchester United – they are still in the European Cup!

— Clive Tyldesley on ITV's broadcast call of Sheringham's injury time equaliser

United won a corner when Effenberg deflected Gary Neville's cross over the Bayern goal line just as the fourth official indicated three minutes of injury time. With so little time left for an equaliser, Schmeichel ventured up to Bayern's penalty area. Beckham flighted the corner in just over Schmeichel's head, Yorke put the ball back towards the crowded area, and after Fink failed to clear sufficiently, the ball arrived at the feet of Giggs on the edge of the area. His right-footed snap-shot was weak and poorly struck, but it went straight to Sheringham, who swiped at the shot with his right foot, and nestled the ball in the bottom corner of the net. The goal was timed at 36 seconds into injury time. It looked as if, having been behind for most of the match, United had forced extra time.

You have to feel this is their year. Is this their moment? Beckham, into Sheringham – and Solskjær has won it! Manchester United have reached the promised land! Ole Solskjær! The two substitutes have scored the two goals in stoppage time and the treble looms large!

— Tyldesley on ITV's broadcast of Solskjær's injury time winner

Less than 30 seconds after the subsequent kick-off, United forced another corner when Kuffour deflected Solskjær's cross over the Bayern goal line, but Schmeichel stayed in his penalty area this time, under instruction from Ferguson. Beckham again swung the corner in, finding the head of Sheringham, who nodded the ball down across the face of goal. Solskjær reacted fastest, stuck out a foot and poked the ball into the roof of the Bayern goal for United to take the lead with just 43 seconds of the three minutes of injury time to play. Solskjær celebrated by sliding on his knees, mimicking Basler's earlier celebration, before quickly being mobbed by the United players, substitutes and coaching staff. Schmeichel, in his own penalty area, cartwheeled with glee.

The game restarted, but many Bayern players were overwhelmed with despair, virtually unable to continue and needed the assistance of referee Collina to drag themselves off the ground. They were stunned to have lost a game they had thought won just minutes before; several celebratory flares had already been ignited by the Bayern fans moments before United equalised, and ribbons in the club's colours had already been secured to the trophy in preparation for the presentation ceremony. United held onto their lead to record their second European Cup title, and at the final whistle, referee Collina described the cheers from the fans as being like a "lion's roar". Kuffour broke down in tears after the game, beating the floor in despair, and Jancker collapsed in anguish. Matthäus had captained Bayern in the 1987 European Cup final and lost in similar circumstances to two late Porto goals. He had been substituted with 10 minutes remaining, with victory seemingly assured.

=== Details ===
26 May 1999
20:45 UTC+2

Manchester United (England)	2–1	(Germany) Bayern Munich
Sheringham 90+1'; Solskjær 90+3'	Report	Basler 6'

Camp Nou, Barcelona
Attendance: 90,245
Referee: Pierluigi Collina (Italy)

Manchester United	Bayern Munich

GK	1	(Denmark) Peter Schmeichel (c)
RB	2	(England) Gary Neville
CB	5	(Norway) Ronny Johnsen
CB	6	(Netherlands) Jaap Stam
LB	3	(Republic of Ireland) Denis Irwin
RM	11	(Wales) Ryan Giggs
CM	7	(England) David Beckham
CM	8	(England) Nicky Butt
LM	15	(Sweden) Jesper Blomqvist	(substituted off) 67'
CF	19	(Trinidad and Tobago) Dwight Yorke
CF	9	(England) Andy Cole	(substituted off) 81'
Substitutes:
GK	17	(Netherlands) Raimond van der Gouw
DF	4	(England) David May
DF	12	(England) Phil Neville
DF	30	(England) Wes Brown
MF	34	(England) Jonathan Greening
FW	10	(England) Teddy Sheringham	(substituted on) 67'
FW	20	(Norway) Ole Gunnar Solskjær	(substituted on) 81'
Coach:
(Scotland) Alex Ferguson

GK	1	(Germany) Oliver Kahn (c)
SW	10	(Germany) Lothar Matthäus		(substituted off) 80'
RB	2	(Germany) Markus Babbel
CB	25	(Germany) Thomas Linke
CB	4	(Ghana) Samuel Kuffour
LB	18	(Germany) Michael Tarnat
CM	11	(Germany) Stefan Effenberg	(yellow card) 60'
CM	16	(Germany) Jens Jeremies
RF	14	(Germany) Mario Basler		(substituted off) 87'
CF	19	(Germany) Carsten Jancker
LF	21	(Germany) Alexander Zickler		(substituted off) 71'
Substitutes:
GK	22	(Germany) Bernd Dreher
DF	5	(Germany) Thomas Helmer
MF	7	(Germany) Mehmet Scholl		(substituted on) 71'
MF	8	(Germany) Thomas Strunz
MF	17	(Germany) Thorsten Fink		(substituted on) 80'
MF	20	(Bosnia and Herzegovina) Hasan Salihamidžić		(substituted on) 87'
FW	24	(Iran) Ali Daei
Coach:
(Germany) Ottmar Hitzfeld

Assistant referees:
Gennaro Mazzei (Italy)
Claudio Puglisi (Italy)
Fourth official:
Fiorenzo Treossi (Italy)

Match rules

- 90 minutes
- 30 minutes of golden goal extra time if necessary
- Penalty shoot-out if no goals occur in extra time
- Seven named substitutes, of which up to three may be used

=== Statistics ===
First half
Statistic	Manchester United	Bayern Munich
Goals scored	0	1
Total shots	6	7
Shots on target	4	2
Ball possession	55%	45%
Corner kicks	6	1
Fouls committed	5	6
Offsides	4	5
Yellow cards	0	0
Red cards	0	0

Second half
Statistic	Manchester United	Bayern Munich
Goals scored	2	0
Total shots	9	8
Shots on target	5	5
Ball possession	51%	49%
Corner kicks	6	6
Fouls committed	6	4
Offsides	2	3
Yellow cards	0	1
Red cards	0	0

Overall
Statistic	Manchester United	Bayern Munich
Goals scored	2	1
Total shots	15	15
Shots on target	9	7
Ball possession	53%	47%
Corner kicks	12	7
Fouls committed	11	10
Offsides	6	8
Yellow cards	0	1
Red cards	0	0

== Post-match and legacy ==
Of course ... In my dreams. This was the summit of unreality. Neither I nor any person involved in this extraordinary game have ever, or will ever see such a finish.

— Rinus Michels, Dutch football manager who won the European Cup and European Championship, responding to a question about whether he had ever witnessed a finish comparable to that of the Champions League final at Camp Nou.

…For me, it was as though the world stood still. I thought, "This is – this is what paradise is all about. It's got to be." And I honestly do not remember what I did for about five minutes…And suddenly, the world was great again. And I thought, "Well, this…There is nothing ever going to be better than this."

— Bobby Charlton, 1966 World Cup winner with England and United's 1968 European Cup-winning captain who watched the final live at the Camp Nou, recalling his reaction to Solskjær's winner in an interview

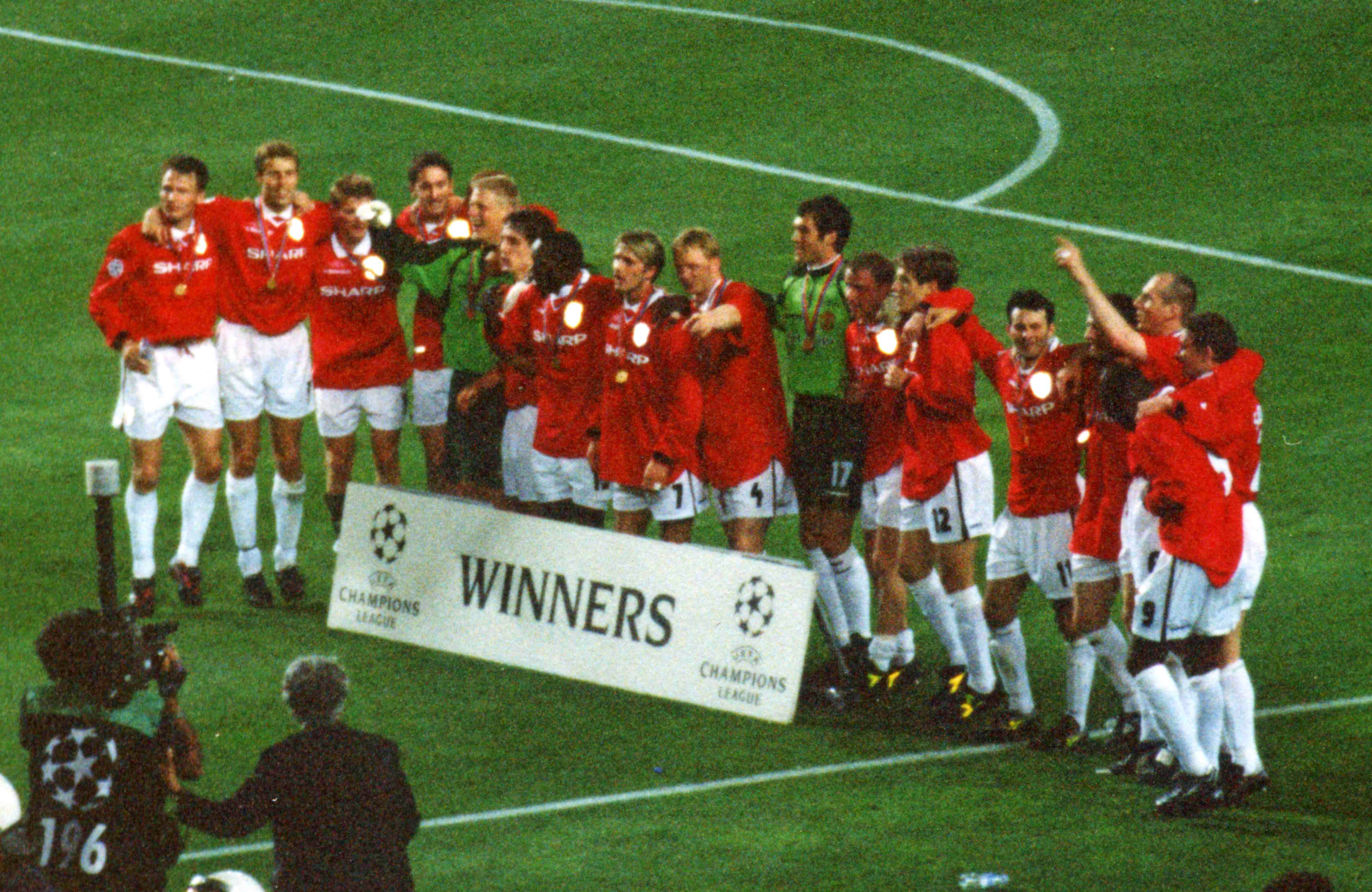
Manchester United's players celebrate after the game.

The game's ending was so unexpected that UEFA President Lennart Johansson had left his seat in the stands before Sheringham's equaliser to make his way down to the pitch to present the European Cup trophy, which was already decorated with red and white ribbons – the colours of both teams. When emerging from the tunnel at the final whistle, he was stunned, and he later said: "I can't believe it. The winners are crying and the losers are dancing." When the two teams went to collect their medals, Matthäus received his runner-up medal but removed it from his neck almost immediately. He never won the competition as a player, having moved to play in the United States for the MetroStars in March 2000, the year before Bayern next won the European Cup in 2001. Matthäus later commented that "it was not the best team that won but the luckiest". As captain of Manchester United, Schmeichel should have received his medal last, but instead he went up first before having to return to the back of the queue with Ferguson; the pair then lifted the trophy together, surrounded by the rest of Manchester United's players, including May, who climbed the presentation podium to a position of prominence in the celebration photographs.

Staying true to his word from earlier in the season, the match was Schmeichel's last in a Manchester United shirt, and a month later he signed for Portuguese club Sporting CP. He spent two seasons in Portugal before returning to England for spells with Aston Villa and Manchester City. It was also Blomqvist's last competitive appearance for the club. After playing in all four matches of the club's pre-season tour of Australia and China in July 1999, he suffered a succession of knee injuries that ruled him out of competitive action for the next two seasons. He made two more appearances for the first team during the 2000–01 pre-season campaign, as well as three matches for the reserves in September and October 2001, before a free transfer to Everton in November that year. For Bayern Munich, substitutes Helmer and Ali Daei left the club in the summer of 1999; Helmer moved to England to play for Sunderland, while Daei remained in Germany with Hertha BSC.

Bayern president Franz Beckenbauer recognised that it was a loss of concentration in the last few minutes that led to his side's defeat: "That was the cruellest defeat possible because victory was so close. We already had victory in the bag and there were only a few seconds to go. But those few seconds were enough for Manchester [United] to get back into the game. We were playing well in the last 20 minutes and should have been able to hold on to victory. But in the end, Manchester deservedly won." Manager Hitzfeld seemed more stunned by the result in his reaction: "I feel so sorry for my team because they were so close to winning this match but they have lost. It's really difficult to digest and this is inconceivable for us but then this is what football is all about. Normally when the opposition equalise you are expecting extra-time and it was a shock to our team when they scored the winner two minutes later. It could take days or even weeks to recover from this but I must say that Manchester are great champions."

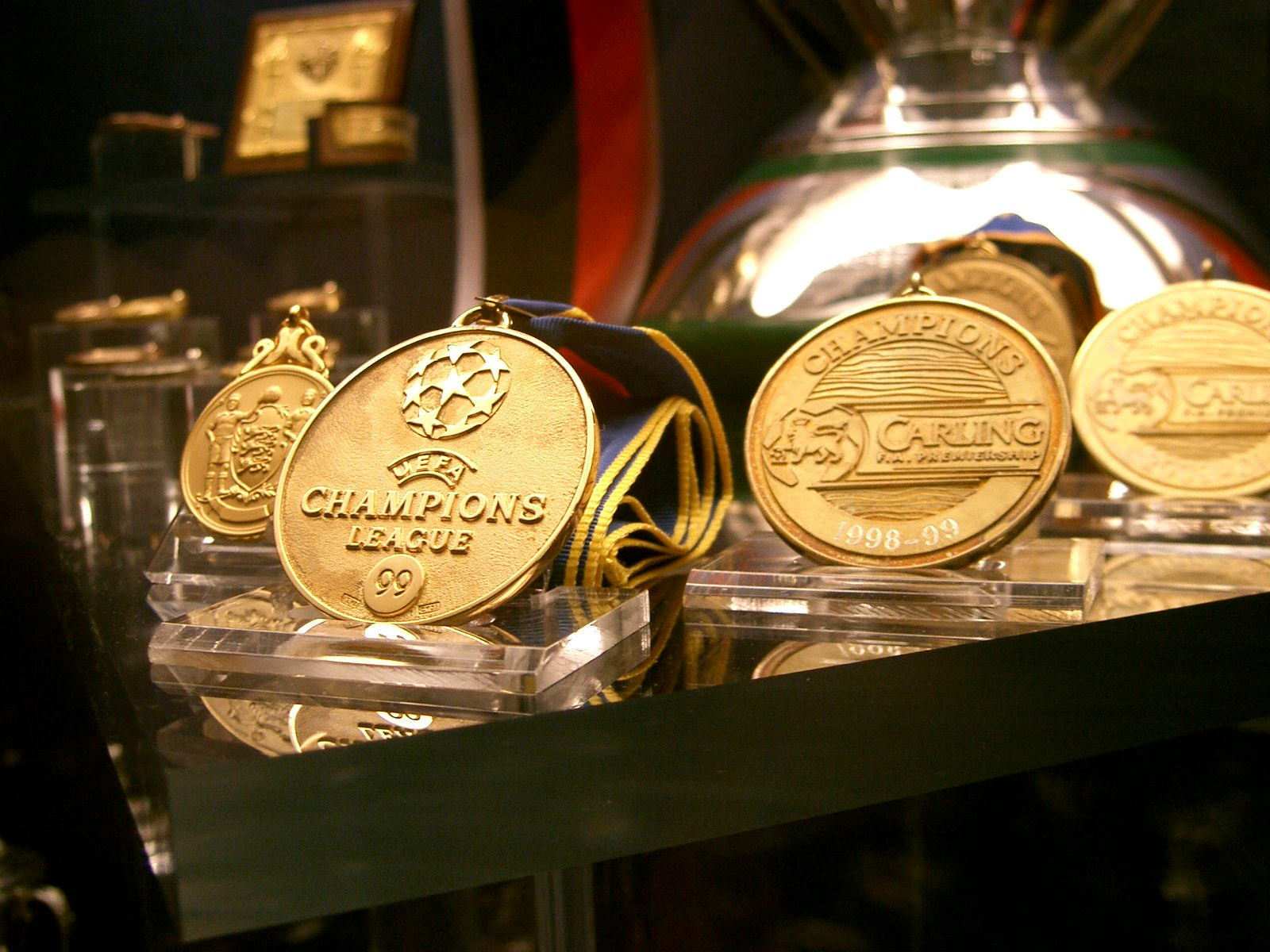
A winner's medal from the 1999 Champions League final on display in the Manchester United Museum

In winning the trophy, Manchester United became the first English team to be crowned European champions since the Heysel Stadium disaster ban in 1985, which had resulted in English clubs being excluded from UEFA competitions for five years, and also the first team to achieve the treble of the Premier League, FA Cup, and European Cup in the same season. It was the first time the treble had been won since PSV Eindhoven in 1988; it would not be won again until Barcelona beat Manchester United 10 years later in the 2009 UEFA Champions League final. After becoming the first manager of an English club to achieve this honour, Ferguson was made a Knight Bachelor on 12 June 1999 in recognition of his services to football, as well as a bonus from the club reported to be in the region of £350,000 (the players received bonuses of £150,000 each). In a post-match interview with ITV's Gary Newbon, Ferguson provided a succinct summary of the game: "Football, eh? Bloody hell". After the treble was secured, much debate arose among English football fans as to whether the 1999 Manchester United team was the greatest club side ever, alongside past European Cup-winning teams. It was such a significant achievement for an English football club that Prime Minister Tony Blair took the time to watch part of the match and congratulate Manchester United from the opening of the new National Assembly for Wales in Cardiff.

Manchester United became the first team to win the European Cup or Champions League without being the champions of Europe or champions of their country the preceding season. They had finished second behind Arsenal in the 1997–98 FA Premier League, but had qualified through UEFA's expanded 24-team format, which had been introduced a season earlier. Had Bayern won the cup, they would have become the first team to achieve this feat, having also finished second in the Bundesliga to Kaiserslautern the season before. While Manchester United finished the season as treble champions, Bayern ultimately lost the DFB-Pokal final to Werder Bremen, which meant they finished the season with the Bundesliga title as their only silverware.

Manchester United received £2 million in prize money from UEFA for winning the competition, on top of the £10 million they had already won just for reaching the final; by comparison, Bayern Munich received £1.6 million for finishing as runners-up. Manchester United also received another financial boost in the form of an increase in the share price of their parent company on the London Stock Exchange; following the match, the price rose from 187 pence per share to 190 pence; however, this was still around 50p less than the shares were trading for earlier in the season during the attempted buyout of the club by BSkyB.

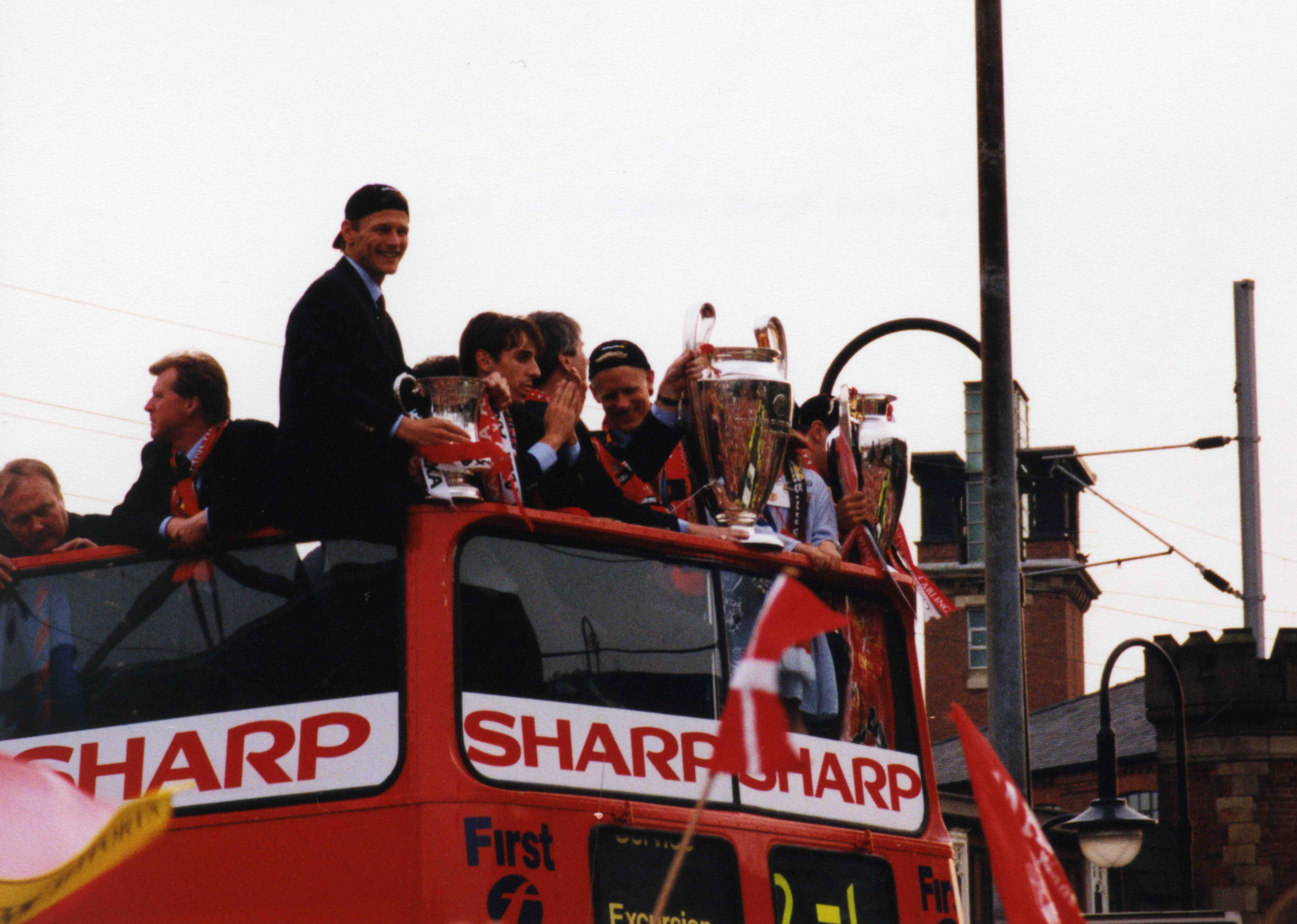
Manchester United celebrated the treble with an open-top bus down Deansgate in Manchester.

Manchester United planned an open-top bus tour of the city of Manchester the day after the game, at which they would parade their three trophies for an expected 700,000 people lining the streets between Sale and the city centre. The parade culminated with a reception at the Manchester Arena, for which 17,500 tickets were made available at £3 each; proceeds went to Ferguson's testimonial fund. Greater Manchester Police later estimated that the actual number of people who attended the parade was around 500,000.

United took UEFA's berth in the 1999 Intercontinental Cup by virtue of the Champions League win, as well as for the new FIFA-sanctioned Club World Championship the following season. The club's participation in the latter was controversial because, under pressure from the Football Association, they withdrew from defending their FA Cup title in the 1999–2000 edition for it.

== Broadcasting ==
In the United Kingdom, ITV Sport broadcast the final with commentary from Clive Tyldesley and Ron Atkinson. The broadcast attracted an average of 15.5 million viewers, with a peak audience of 18.8 million at 21:30, just as Manchester United scored their two goals. The climax of the game was voted as the fourth-greatest sporting moment ever by Channel 4 viewers in a 2002 poll. Alan Green and Mark Lawrenson commentated the final for BBC Radio 5 Live. In a 2024 BBC poll celebrating the station's 30th anniversary, listeners ranked it eighth on the list of most defining sporting moments in the station's history.

In Germany, the match was shown on RTL Television, and was seen by an average of 13.59 million people over the course of the broadcast. In Spain, the match was shown on TVE. In France, the match was shown on TF1 with commentary by Thierry Roland and Jean-Michel Larqué, the pairing who had also commentated the 1998 World Cup final for the same station.

== Treble Reunion match ==
On 26 May 2019, Manchester United hosted a reunion match at Old Trafford against a Bayern Munich Legends team to mark the 20th anniversary of winning the treble and to raise money for the Manchester United Foundation. Most of the Manchester United squad from the 1998–99 season returned for the match, with the exception of Giggs, who was on coaching duty with the Wales national team. Despite not having been with Manchester United during the 1998–99 season, Karel Poborský, Mikaël Silvestre and Louis Saha completed the squad as regular participants in Manchester United Legends matches. Ferguson returned to manage the side, six years after his retirement from full-time management, joined by his 1999 assistant Steve McClaren and former club captain Bryan Robson as head coach. The Bayern squad featured six players who appeared in the 1999 final – Babbel, Kuffour, Effenberg, Matthäus, Jancker and Fink – as well as striker Élber, who missed the original match through injury.

Manchester United won the match 5–0. Solskjær, who had been appointed as manager of Manchester United in December 2018, opened the scoring in the fifth minute, having come on for Cole in the first minute of the match due to Cole's continued struggle with kidney trouble. Yorke made it 2–0 on the half-hour mark, before second-half goals from Butt, Saha and Beckham completed the scoring. The match was played in front of 61,175 spectators and raised £1.5 million for the Manchester United Foundation.

== See also ==
- 1999 UEFA Cup final
- 1999 UEFA Cup Winners' Cup final
- 1998–99 FC Bayern Munich season
- 1998–99 Manchester United F.C. season
- FC Bayern Munich in international football
- Manchester United F.C. in international football
