= Vasić =

Vasić (Serbian Cyrillic: Васић) is a Serbian, Croatian and Bosnian surname, a patronymic derived from Vasa and Vaso (diminutives of Vasilije and Vasoje).

== Geographical distribution ==
As of 2014, 77.3% of all known bearers of the surname Vasić were residents of Serbia (frequency 1:285), 14.9% of Bosnia and Herzegovina (1:731), 5.1% of Kosovo (1:1,122) and 1.4% of Croatia (1:9,418).

In Serbia, the frequency of the surname was higher than national average (1:285) in the following districts:

1. Mačva District (1:79)
2. Pomoravlje District (1:121)
3. Rasina District (1:143)
4. Braničevo District (1:153)
5. Podunavlje District (1:160)
6. Kolubara District (1:188)
7. Nišava District (1:265)
8. Belgrade (1:270)
9. Toplica District (1:284)

== People ==
- Aleksandar Vasić (basketball) (born 1987), Serbian basketball player
- Aleksandar Vasić (politician), deputy chairman of the State Broadcasting Agency Council in the Republic of Serbia
- Bane Vasic, American engineer
- Dejan Vasić (born 1980), Serbian footballer
- Đurađ Vasić (born 1956), Serbian footballer and manager
- Jovan Vasić (born 1987), Serbian footballer
- Kara-Marko Vasić (fl. 1804–15), Serbian Revolutionary
- Milan Vasić (1928–2003), Serbian historian
- Miloš Vasić (born 1991), Serbian rower
- Nenad Vasić (born 1979), Serbian footballer
- Nikola Vasić (born 1984), Serbian basketball player
- Radojica Vasić (born 1976), Serbian footballer
- Sonja Vasić (born 1989), Serbian basketball player

== See also ==
- Vasović
- Vasojević
- Vasiljević
