= Vasilić =

Vasilić (Serbian: Василић) is a Serbian and Croatian surname. Notable people with the surname include:

- Jovica Vasilić (born 1990), Serbian footballer
- Velibor Vasilić (born 1980), Bosnia and Herzegovina footballer

== See also ==
- Vasilijević, surname
- Vasiljević, surname
- Vasić, surname
