= Vasiljević =

Vasiljević (Serbian Cyrillic: Васиљевић) is a Serbian patronymic surname, derived from the masculine Vasilije (itself a variation of Vassilios) or feminine Vasilisa. It may refer to:

== People ==
- Aco Vasiljević (born 1973), Serbian footballer
- Aleksandar Vasiljević (disambiguation), multiple individuals
- Dušan Vasiljević (footballer) (born 1982), Serbian footballer
- Mirka Vasiljević (born 1990), Serbian actress, model and television presenter
- Nikola Vasiljević (born 1983), Bosnian footballer
- Nikola Vasiljević (born 1983), Serbian footballer
- Petar Vasiljević (born 1970), Serbian footballer
- Saša Vasiljević (born 1979), Bosnian basketball player

== See also ==
- Vasilijević, surname
- Vasilić, surname
- Vasić, surname
