= Vasilijević =

Vasilijević (Serbian: Василијевић) is a montenegrin surname, a patronymic derived from the given name Vasilije.

== Geographical distribution ==
As of 2014, 94.0% of all known bearers of the surname Vasilijević were residents of Serbia (frequency 1:4,198) and 5.4% of Montenegro (1:6,426).

In Serbia, the frequency of the surname was higher than national average (1:4,198) in the following districts:

1. Moravica District (1:425)
2. Zlatibor District (1:978)
3. Rasina District (1:1,209)
4. Zaječar District (1:1,313)
5. Pomoravlje District (1:1,795)
6. Šumadija District (1:1,927)

== People ==
- Goran Vasilijević (born 1965), Serbian footballer
- Vladan Vasilijević, Serbian politician

== See also ==
- Vasiljević, surname
- Vasilić, surname
