= Kristinn Hafliðason =

Icelandic footballer

Personal information
- Date of birth: 3 June 1975 (age 51)
- Height: 1.80 m (5 ft 11 in)
- Position: Midfielder

Senior career*
Years	Team	Apps	(Gls)
1992–1993	Víkingur		
1994–1995	Fram		
1996–1999	ÍBV		
2000–2001	Raufoss IL		
2001–2004	KR		
2005	Þróttur		
2006–2008	Valur		

International career
1994	Iceland	1	(0)
- * Club domestic league appearances and goals

Kristinn Hafliðason (born 3 June 1975) is a retired Icelandic football midfielder.
