= Mihăiță Székely =

Romanian footballer

Personal information
- Full name: Mihăiță Gabriel Székely
- Date of birth: 8 September 1972 (age 54)
- Place of birth: Vatra Dornei, Romania
- Position: Midfielder

Senior career*
| Years | Team | Apps | (Gls) |
| 1996–1998 | Foresta Suceava | | |
| 1998–1999 | Steaua București | | |
| 1999–2000 | Școlar Reșița | | |
| –2002 | Győri ETO | | |
| 2002–2003 | CFR Cluj | | |
- * Club domestic league appearances and goals

Mihăiță Székely (born 8 September 1972) is a retired Romanian football midfielder.
