= Aleksandar Vasić (politician) =

Serbian politician

Aleksandar Vasić is the deputy chairman of the State Broadcasting Agency (RRA) Council in the Republic of Serbia.

He is currently embroiled in the controversy of the Khrlo e Romengo affair.

Vasić was also involved in the revocation of RTV BK Telecoms broadcasting license.
