= Osipaonica =

- Village (Selo)
- Location within Serbia
- Coordinates: 44°32′27″N 21°03′12″E
- Country: Serbia
- District: Podunavlje District
- Municipality: Smederevo
- Elevation: 246 ft (75 m)

Population (2022)
  - Total: 2,873
- Time zone: UTC+1 (CET)
  - Summer (DST): UTC+2 (CEST)

Osipaonica is a Village in the municipality of Smederevo, Serbia. According to the 2002 census, the village has a population of 4071 people.
