= Ivan Lapšanský =

Slovak footballer

Personal information
- Date of birth: 6 November 1973 (age 52)
- Height: 1.79 m (5 ft 10 in)
- Position: Forward

Senior career*
Years	Team	Apps	(Gls)
1993–1999	1. FC Košice		
1994	→ Dukla Banská Bystrica (loan)		
1996–1997	→ Dukla Banská Bystrica (loan)		
1998	→ Lokomotíva Košice (loan)		
1999–2002	SC Interwetten.com		
2002–2005	Steel Trans Licartovce/MFK Košice		
2005–2008	1. HFC Humenné		

Managerial career
- 2016: FC VSS Košice
- 2016–2017: MFK Zemplín Michalovce (assistant)
- 2017: FK Spartaks Jūrmala (assistant)
- 2018-2019: Podbrezová U19 (assistant)
- 2019: FK Poprad (assistant)
- 2020-21: FK Senica (assistant)
- 2021-2022: FC Košice (assistant)
- * Club domestic league appearances and goals

Ivan Lapšanský (born 6 November 1973) is a retired Slovak football striker and later manager.
