= Aleksandr Osipovich =

Belarusian footballer

Personal information
- Date of birth: 22 March 1977 (age 49)
- Place of birth: Minsk, Belarusian SSR
- Height: 1.78 m (5 ft 10 in)
- Position: Midfielder

Youth career
- 1994–1996: Dinamo-Juni Minsk

Senior career*
Years	Team	Apps	(Gls)
1995–1996	Dinamo-Juni Minsk	23	(7)
1997–1999	Dinamo Minsk	56	(3)
2000	Žalgiris Vilnius	27	(21)
2001–2002	Zagłębie Lubin	25	(7)
2002–2003	Žalgiris Vilnius	2	(0)
2003	Darida Minsk Raion	5	(0)
2003	MTZ-RIPO Minsk	9	(3)
2004	Polonia Warsaw	4	(0)
2004	ZLiN Gomel	9	(1)
2005	Žalgiris Vilnius	14	(2)
2005	Radomiak Radom	9	(4)
2006	Lokomotiv Vitebsk	1	(0)
2006	Sūduva Marijampolė	10	(0)
2007	Interas Visaginas	4	(0)
2008–2009	Gorodeya	34	(5)

International career
1994	Belarus U18	2	(3)
1996–1999	Belarus U21	16	(0)
- * Club domestic league appearances and goals

Aleksandr Osipovich (Belarusian: Аляксандр Асіповіч; Russian: Александр Осипович; born 22 March 1977) is a Belarusian former professional footballer who plays as a midfielder. After retirement, he works as a football agent.

== Honours ==
Dinamo Minsk

- Belarusian Premier League: 1997

Sūduva

- Lithuanian Cup: 2006
