= Paris Elia =

Cypriot footballer (born 1972)

Personal information
- Full name: Paraskevas Elia
- Date of birth: January 6, 1972 (age 54)
- Place of birth: Famagusta, Cyprus
- Position: Defender

Senior career*
| Years | Team | Apps | (Gls) |
| 1995–1997 | Alki Larnaca | 49 | (5) |
| 1997–1998 | Anorthosis Famagusta | 23 | (3) |
| 1998–1999 | Nea Salamina | 20 | (2) |
| 2000–2001 | AC Omonia | 20 | (0) |
| 2001–2004 | AEK Larnaca | 52 | (0) |
| 2004–2005 | Alki Larnaca | 23 | (0) |
| 2005–2006 | Nea Salamina | 18 | (0) |
| 2006–2007 | Alki Larnaca | 19 | (0) |
| 2007–2008 | Ermis Aradippou | 17 | (0) |

International career
| 1998 | Cyprus | 1 | (0) |

Managerial career
- 2012–2015: P.O. Xylotymbou
- * Club domestic league appearances and goals

Paris Elia (Greek: Πάρης Ηλία; born January 6, 1972) is a former international Cypriot football defender.

He started his career from Alki Larnaca but he played for many teams such as Anorthosis Famagusta, Nea Salamina, AC Omonia, AEK Larnaca, Ayia Napa FC. For 2007-2008 his team was Ermis Aradippou in Second Division where he finished his career.

== Honours ==
AEK Larnaca

- Cypriot Cup: 2003–04
