= Aleksandar Vasiljević =

Aleksandar Vasiljević may refer to:

- Aleksandar Vasiljević (general)
- Aleksandar Vasiljević (footballer, born 1982)
- Aleksandar Vasiljević (footballer, born 2001)
