= Jari Jäväjä =

Finnish footballer (born 1973)

Personal information
- Full name: Jari Petteri Jäväjä
- Date of birth: 16 August 1973 (age 53)
- Place of birth: Kemi, Finland
- Height: 1.82 m (6 ft 0 in)
- Position: Forward

Senior career*
Years	Team	Apps	(Gls)
1989–1994	KePS	75	(14)
1995–1997	VPS	72	(17)
1996	→ Närpes Kraft (loan)	1	(0)
1998–1999	HJK	34	(4)
1999	→ KäPa (loan)	2	(3)
1999	TPV	3	(1)
2000–2002	OLS Oulu	34	(31)
2003–2004	AC Oulu	23	(1)

International career
1995–1997	Finland	6	(0)

Managerial career
- 2007–2008: OLS Oulu (assistant)
- 2009: OLS Oulu
- * Club domestic league appearances and goals

Jari Jäväjä (born 16 August 1973) is a retired Finnish football striker.

Jäväjä was part of the HJK Helsinki squad that qualified for the 1998–99 UEFA Champions League group stage as the first and still the only Finnish club ever.

== Career statistics ==
As of 1 September 2024.

Appearances and goals by club, season and competition
Club	Season	League			Europe		Total	
Club	Season	Division	Apps	Goals	Apps	Goals	Apps	Goals
KePS	1989	Mestaruussarja	1	0	–		1	0
KePS	1990	Ykkönen	1	0	–		1	0
KePS	1991	Ykkönen	6	0	–		6	0
KePS	1992	Ykkönen	22	2	–		22	2
KePS	1993	Ykkönen	21	5	–		21	5
KePS	1994	Ykkönen	24	7	–		24	7
KePS	Total		75	14	0	0	75	14
VPS	1995	Veikkausliiga	25	9	–		25	9
VPS	1996	Veikkausliiga	20	1	–		20	1
VPS	1997	Veikkausliiga	27	7	–		27	7
VPS	Total		72	17	0	0	72	17
Närpes Kraft (loan)	1996	Kakkonen	1	0	–		1	0
HJK Helsinki	1998	Veikkausliiga	22	3	4 (Note: Appearances in UEFA Champions League)	1	26	4
HJK Helsinki	1999	Veikkausliiga	12	1	2 (Note: Appearances in UEFA Cup)	0	14	1
HJK Helsinki	Total		34	4	6	1	40	5
KäPa (loan)	1999	Kakkonen	2	3	–		2	3
TPV	1999	Veikkausliiga	3	1	–		3	1
OLS	2000	Kakkonen	4	6	–		4	6
OLS	2001	Kakkonen	15	12	–		15	12
OLS	2002	Kakkonen	15	13	–		15	13
OLS	Total		34	31	0	0	34	31
AC Oulu	2003	Ykkönen	5	0	–		5	0
AC Oulu	2004	Ykkönen	18	1	–		18	1
AC Oulu	Total		23	1	0	0	23	1
Career total			242	71	6	1	248	72
