= Dejan Vasić =

Serbian footballer

Personal information
- Full name: Dejan Vasić
- Date of birth: December 31, 1980 (age 45)
- Place of birth: Belgrade, SFR Yugoslavia
- Height: 1.71 m (5 ft 7 in)
- Position: Midfielder

Youth career
- Red Star Belgrade

Senior career*
Years	Team	Apps	(Gls)
2001–2006	Budućnost Banatski Dvor	49	(8)
2006–2008	Banat Zrenjanin	19	(0)
2008–2009	Sloga Kraljevo	23	(1)
2009–2010	Šumadija Radnički 1923	2	(0)
Total		93	(9)
- * Club domestic league appearances and goals

Dejan Vasić (Serbian Cyrillic: Дејан Васић; born December 31, 1980) is a Serbian footballer who lastly played for FK Šumadija Radnički 1923. He previously played for FK Budućnost Banatski Dvor and FK Banat Zrenjanin.
