= Aco Vasiljević =

Serbian footballer

Personal information
- Full name: Aleksandar Vasiljević
- Date of birth: 25 September 1973 (age 53)
- Place of birth: Čačak, SFR Yugoslavia
- Height: 1.89 m (6 ft 2 in)
- Position: Striker

Senior career*
| Years | Team | Apps | (Gls) |
| 1994 | Borac Čačak | | |
| 1998 | Obilić | 5 | (1) |
| 1999 | OFK Beograd | | |
| 1999–2002 | Metalurh Zaporizhzhia | 13 | (5) |
| 2000–2001 | → Metalurh-2 Zaporizhzhia | 4 | (1) |
| 2004–2005 | Närpes Kraft | | |
| 2005 | HJK Helsinki | 5 | (0) |
- * Club domestic league appearances and goals

Aleksandar Vasiljević (born 25 September 1973), commonly known as Aco Vasiljević, is a retired Serbian football striker.
