= Khrlo e Romengo =

Serbian radio station in the Romani language

Khrlo e Romengo is a radio station, transmitting by satellite from Belgrade, Serbia, run by the Voice of Roma NGO, featuring programming in the Romani language.
