= 2024 Vaasan Palloseura season =

Vaasan Palloseura
2024 season
- Manager: Jussi Nuorela
- Stadium: Hietalahti Stadium
- Veikkausliiga: 5th
- Finnish Cup: Sixth round
- UEFA Conference League: First qualifying round

The 2024 season is the 101st season in the history of Vaasan Palloseura and the club's third consecutive season in the Finnish top flight. VPS was eliminated from the Finnish Cup in the sixth round with a 5–1 loss to Seinäjoen Jalkapallokerho.

== Squad ==
Note: Flags indicate national team as defined under FIFA eligibility rules; some limited exceptions apply. Players may hold more than one non-FIFA nationality.

No.	Pos.	Nation	Player
1	GK	FIN	Teppo Marttinen
2	DF	FIN	Josep Nuorela
4	DF	FIN	Jesper Engström
5	DF	FIN	Mikko Pitkänen
9	FW	FIN	Riku Jääskä
10	FW	SUR	Gleofilo Vlijter
11	FW	DEN	Mads Borchers
14	MF	NGR	Peter Eletu
16	FW	FIN	Teemu Hytönen
17	FW	FIN	Kalle Multanen
19	DF	FIN	Martti Haukioja
20	DF	FIN	Juho Hyvärinen
21	MF	GHA	Prosper Ahiabu
23	DF	FIN	Miika Niemi

No.	Pos.	Nation	Player
24	GK	FIN	Rasmus Leislahti
25	MF	FIN	Samuel Lindeman
26	MF	FIN	Antonio Almen
27	DF	FIN	Gabriel Sillanpää
28	FW	FIN	Roni Hudd
29	DF	GBS	Pedro Justiniano
30	MF	FIN	Joonas Vahtera
33	MF	FIN	Akon Kuek
34	MF	FIN	Antti-Ville Räisänen
36	DF	FIN	Felix Friberg
44	MF	RUS	Yevgeni Bashkirov
77	FW	FIN	Samu Alanko
—	DF	ENG	Alfie Cicale
—	FW	NGR	Franklin Matib

=== Out on loan ===
Note: Flags indicate national team as defined under FIFA eligibility rules; some limited exceptions apply. Players may hold more than one non-FIFA nationality.

No.	Pos.	Nation	Player
—	GK	FIN	Lauri Vetri (at VIFK until 31 December 2024)

== Pre-season ==
20 January 2024 Friendly	SJK Akatemia (Finland)	1–0	(Finland) VPS

9 March 2024 Friendly	SJK (Finland)	2–2	(Finland) VPS

15 March 2024 Friendly	Umeå FC (Sweden)	1–4	(Finland) VPS

23 March 2024 Friendly	Ilves (Finland)	1–2	(Finland) VPS

29 March 2024 Friendly	VPS (Finland)	5–1	(Finland) FF Jaro

== Competitions ==
=== Overall record ===
Competition	First match	Last match	Starting round	Final position	Record							
Competition	First match	Last match	Starting round	Final position	Pld	W	D	L	GF	GA	GD	Win %
Veikkausliiga	6 April 2024	1 September 2024	Matchday 1		15	7	4	4	25	21	+4	46.67
Finnish Cup	15 June 2024	25 June 2024	Fifth round	Sixth round	2	1	0	1	6	6	+0	50.00
Finnish League Cup	27 January 2024	24 February 2024	Group stage	Group stage	5	1	1	3	4	11	−7	20.00
UEFA Conference League	11 July 2024		First qualifying round		1	0	0	1	1	2	−1	0.00
Total					23	9	5	9	36	40	−4	39.13

Last updated: 11 July 2024
Source: Soccerway

=== Veikkausliiga ===
==== Regular season ====
Pos	Team	Pld	W	D	L	GF	GA	GD	Pts	Qualification
4	SJK	22	10	6	6	40	33	+7	36	Qualification for the Championship Round
5	Haka	22	10	5	7	35	32	+3	35	Qualification for the Championship Round
6	VPS	22	9	5	8	34	36	−2	32	Qualification for the Championship Round
7	Inter Turku	22	9	4	9	38	29	+9	31	Qualification for the Relegation Round
8	Gnistan	22	8	6	8	32	34	−2	30	Qualification for the Relegation Round

Source: Flashscore
Rules for classification: 1) Points; 2) Goal difference; 3) Goals scored; 4) Head-to-head points; 5) Head-to-head goal difference; 6) Head-to-head away goals scored; 7) Play-off
(Note: Play-off is only played if need to decide champion, teams for relegation or UEFA competition and will be played on a neutral ground).

Pos	Team	Pld	W	D	L	GF	GA	GD	Pts	Qualification
2	Ilves	27	16	6	5	56	27	+29	54	Qualification for the Europa League first qualifying round (Note: The 2024 Finnish Cup winners qualified for the Conference League second qualifying round. Since the cup winners (KuPS) qualified based on league position, the Conference League second round spot was passed to the second-placed team. However due to the 2024-25 UEFA Conference League titleholders qualifying directly for the Champions League via their own domestic league, the spot reserved in the Europa League for the Conference League titleholders was vacated, and after rebalancing, the spot in the Conference League second qualifying round was transferred to the Europa League first qualifying round.)
3	HJK	27	13	6	8	44	27	+17	45	Qualification for the Conference League first qualifying round (Note: Since the Conference League second qualifying round spot was passed to the second-placed team, the Conference League first round spot was passed to the third-placed team, the Conference League play-off final spot was passed to the fourth-placed team, and the fourth Conference League play-off quarter-final spot was passed to the eighth-placed team.)
4	SJK (O)	27	11	7	9	46	44	+2	40	Qualification for the Conference League first qualifying round play-off final
5	VPS	27	11	6	10	43	45	−2	39	Qualification for the Conference League first qualifying round play-off quarter-finals
6	Haka	27	11	5	11	40	43	−3	38	Qualification for the Conference League first qualifying round play-off quarter-finals

Source: Flashscore
Rules for classification: 1) Points; 2) Goal difference; 3) Goals scored; 4) Head-to-head points; 5) Head-to-head goal difference; 6) Head-to-head away goals scored; 7) Play-off
(Note: Play-off is only played if need to decide champion, teams for relegation or UEFA competition and will be played on a neutral ground).
(O) Play-off winners
Notes:

Pos	Team	Pld	W	D	L	GF	GA	GD	Pts	Qualification or relegation
1	Inter Turku	27	12	5	10	46	34	+12	41	Qualification for the Conference League first qualifying round play-off quarter-finals
2	Gnistan	27	10	7	10	40	43	−3	37	Qualification for the Conference League first qualifying round play-off quarter-finals
3	Oulu	27	7	7	13	32	40	−8	28	
4	Mariehamn	27	7	5	15	27	44	−17	26	
5	Lahti (R)	27	4	12	11	31	47	−16	24	Qualification for the Veikkausliiga play-off
6	EIF (R)	27	4	7	16	24	57	−33	19	Relegation to the Ykkösliiga

Source: Flashscore
Rules for classification: 1) Points; 2) Goal difference; 3) Goals scored; 4) Head-to-head points; 5) Head-to-head goal difference; 6) Head-to-head away goals scored; 7) Play-off
(Note: Play-off is only played if need to decide champion, teams for relegation or UEFA competition and will be played on a neutral ground).
(R) Relegated

==== Results summary ====
Overall								Home						Away					
Pld	W	D	L	GF	GA	GD	Pts	W	D	L	GF	GA	GD	W	D	L	GF	GA	GD
15	7	4	4	25	21	+4	25	3	3	2	15	12	+3	4	1	2	10	9	+1

==== Results by round ====
Round	1	2	3	4	5	6	7	8	9	10	11	12	13	14	15	16
Ground	A	H	H	A	H	A	A	H	A	H	A	H	A	H	H	A
Result	W	D	W	W	W	L	W	W	W	D	D	D	L	L	L	
Position																

A = Away; H = Home; W = Win; D = Draw; L = Loss

==== Matches ====
The match schedule was released on 18 January.

6 April 2024 1	FC Haka	1–2	VPS	Valkeakoski
				Stadium: Tehtaan kenttä

12 April 2024 2	VPS	1–1	SJK

20 April 2024 3	VPS	3–2	IF Gnistan

27 April 2024 4	AC Oulu	1–2	VPS	Oulu
				Stadium: Raatti Stadion

3 May 2024 5	VPS	3–0	FC Lahti

10 May 2024 6	KuPS	2–1	VPS	Kuopio
				Stadium: Väre Areena

17 May 2024 7	HJK	1–2	VPS	Helsinki
				Stadium: Bolt Arena

22 May 2024 15	VPS	1–3	KuPS Kuopio

27 May 2024 8	VPS	3–1	Inter Turku

2 June 2024 9	Ekenäs IF	1–2	VPS	Raseborg
				Stadium: Ekenäs Centrumplan

7 June 2024 10	VPS	1–1	Ilves

12 June 2024 11	IFK Mariehamn	0–0	VPS	Mariehamn
				Stadium: Wiklöf Holding Arena

19 June 2024 12	VPS	1–1	AC Oulu

28 June 2024 13	Inter Turku	3–1	VPS	Turku
				Stadium: Veritas Stadion

6 July 2024 14	VPS	2–3	Ekenäs IF

21 July 2024 16	Ilves	v	VPS	Tampere
				Stadium: Tammelan Stadion

28 July 2024 17	VPS	v	IFK Mariehamn

=== Finnish Cup ===
15 June 2024 Fifth round	FC Inter 2	1–5	VPS	Turku
19:00 UTC+3				Stadium: Veritas Stadion; Referee: Jesse Salo

25 June 2024 Sixth round	SJK	5–1	VPS	Seinäjoki
19:00 UTC+3				Stadium: OmaSP Stadion; Referee: Matti Roth

=== Finnish League Cup ===
==== Group stage ====
27 January 2024 1	VPS	2–1	SJK	Vaasa
18:00 UTC+2	Nuorela 45+3'; Alanko 58'		Gasc 59'	Stadium: VEO Areena; Referee: Mikko Juusola

3 February 2024 2	Ilves	3–1	VPS	Tampere
14:45 UTC+2				Stadium: Pirkkahalli C

8 February 2024 3	KuPS	5–0	VPS	Kuopio
15:00 UTC+2				Stadium: Lippumäen kuplahalli

17 February 2024 4	VPS	1–1	AC Oulu	Vaasa
18:00 UTC+2				Stadium: VEO Areena

24 February 2024 5	VPS	0–1	Haka	Vaasa
18:00 UTC+2				Stadium: VEO Areena
