= Antonio Almen =

Finnish footballer (born 2004)

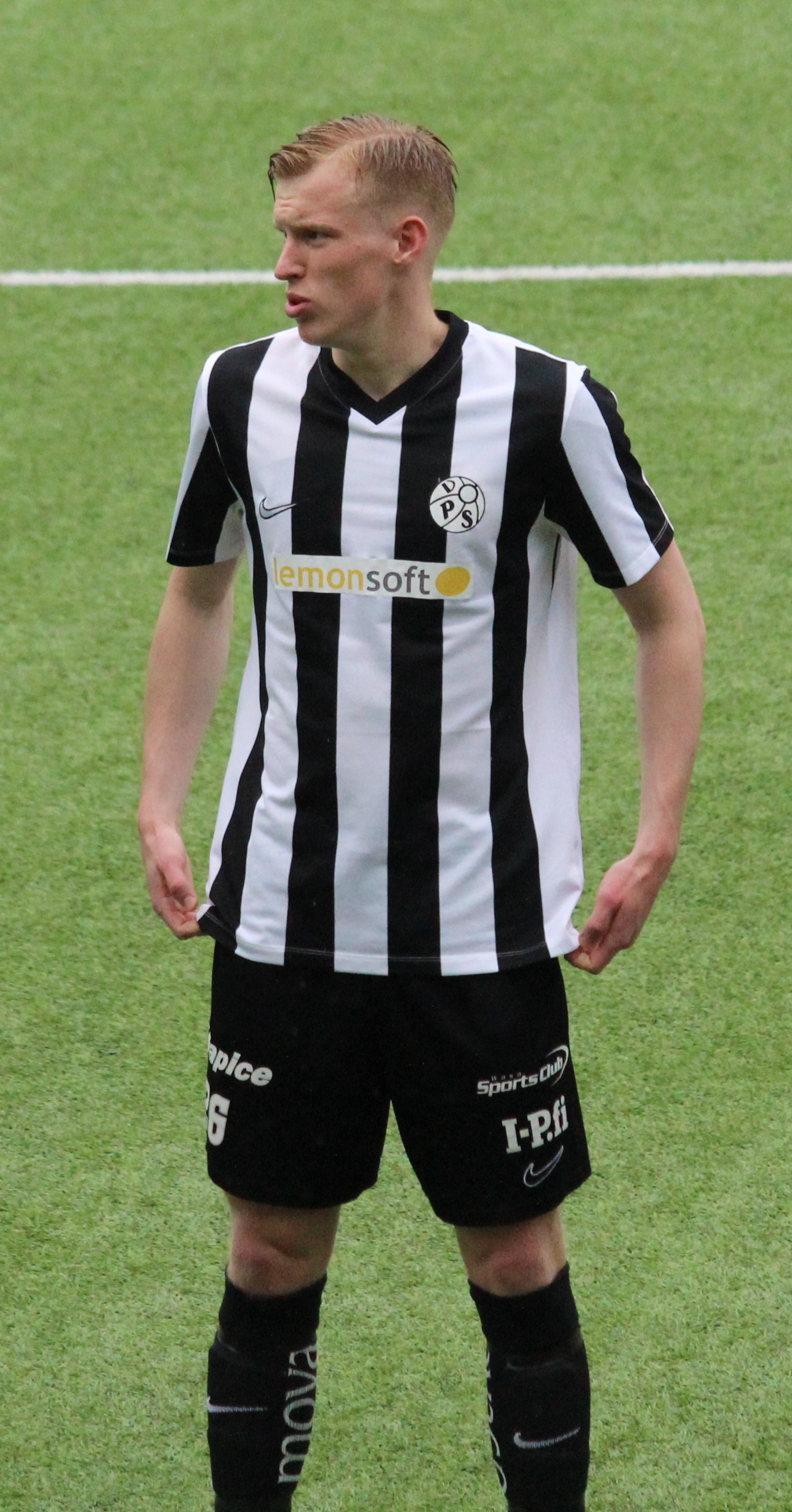
- Almen with VPS in 2025

Personal information
- Date of birth: 7 April 2004 (age 22)
- Place of birth: Korsholm, Finland
- Height: 1.84 m (6 ft 0 in)
- Position: Midfielder

Team information
- Current team: Skövde AIK
- Number: 26

Youth career
- VIFK
- VPS

Senior career*
Years	Team	Apps	(Gls)
2020–2025	VPS II	35	(27)
2022–2025	VPS	20	(1)
2023	→ VIFK (loan)	9	(0)
2026	Käpylän Pallo	18	(4)
2026–	Skövde AIK	6	(1)
- * Club domestic league appearances and goals as of 16 November 2026

Antonio Almen (born 7 April 2004) is a Finnish professional football player, playing as a midfielder for Skövde AIK.

== Club career ==
Almen debuted in Veikkausliiga with VPS first team on 20 April 2024 in a 3–2 home win against Gnistan. On 22 May 2024, he scored his first goal in the league, in a 3–1 home loss against Kuopion Palloseura (KuPS).

== Career statistics ==
As of 26 July 2026

Appearances and goals by club, season and competition
Club	Season	League			Cup (Note: Includes Suomen Cup)		League cup (Note: Includes Finnish League Cup)		Europe		Total	
Club	Season	Division	Apps	Goals	Apps	Goals	Apps	Goals	Apps	Goals	Apps	Goals
VPS Akatemia	2020	Kolmonen	3	0	–		–		–		3	0
VPS Akatemia	2021	Kolmonen	2	0	–		–		–		2	0
VPS Akatemia	2022	Kolmonen	6	0	–		–		–		6	0
VPS Akatemia	2023	Kolmonen	7	7	–		–		–		7	7
VPS Akatemia	2024	Kolmonen	11	11	–		–		–		11	11
VPS Akatemia	Total		29	18	0	0	0	0	0	0	29	18
VPS	2022	Veikkausliiga	0	0	0	0	2	0	–		2	0
VPS	2023	Veikkausliiga	0	0	1	0	2	0	–		3	0
VPS	2024	Veikkausliiga	13	1	1	0	3	0	1 (Note: Includes UEFA Conference League)	0	18	1
VPS	2025	Veikkausliiga	7	0	2	0	4	0	–		4	0
VPS	Total		20	1	4	0	11	0	1	0	34	1
VIFK (loan)	2023	Kakkonen	9	0	–		–		–		9	0
Käpylän Pallo	2026	Ykkösliiga	14	4	1	0	6	1	–		9	0
Career total			71	23	5	0	17	1	1	0	94	24
