= Rachide Gnanou =

Burkinabe footballer (born 2004)

Personal information
- Full name: Pakwo Abdoul Rachide Gnanou
- Date of birth: 16 November 2004 (age 21)
- Place of birth: Tangin Dassouri, Burkina Faso
- Height: 1.86 m (6 ft 1 in)
- Position: Centre back

Team information
- Current team: Gnistan
- Number: 24

Youth career
- AS SONABEL

Senior career*
Years	Team	Apps	(Gls)
2021–2023	Vitesse	39	(0)
2023–2024	Majestic	32	(1)
2025–	Gnistan	57	(8)
- * Club domestic league appearances and goals as of 13 November 2026

Pakwo Abdoul Rachide Gnanou (born 16 November 2004) is a Burkinabé professional footballer who plays as a centre back for Gnistan in the Veikkausliiga.

== Club career ==
After starting his career in his native Burkina Faso, in January 2025 Gnanou joined Finnish Veikkausliiga side IF Gnistan, signing a one-year contract with an option for two further years.

== Career statistics ==
As of 10 August 2025

Appearances and goals by club, season and competition
Club	Season	League			National cup (Note: Includes Coupe du Faso and Suomen Cup)		League cup (Note: Includes Finnish League Cup)		Continental		Total	
Club	Season	Division	Apps	Goals	Apps	Goals	Apps	Goals	Apps	Goals	Apps	Goals
Vitesse	2021–22	Burkinabé Premier League	22	0	0	0	–		–		22	0
Vitesse	2022–23	Burkinabé Premier League	17	0	2	0	–		–		19	0
Vitesse	Total		39	0	2	0	0	0	0	0	41	0
Majestic	2023–24	Burkinabé Premier League	19	1	2	0	–		–		21	1
Majestic	2024–25	Burkinabé Premier League	13	0	0	0	–		–		13	0
Majestic	Total		32	1	2	0	0	0	0	0	34	1
Gnistan	2025	Veikkausliiga	16	3	3	0	4	0	–		23	3
Career total			87	4	7	0	4	0	0	0	97	2
