= Martti Haukioja =

Finnish footballer (born 1999)

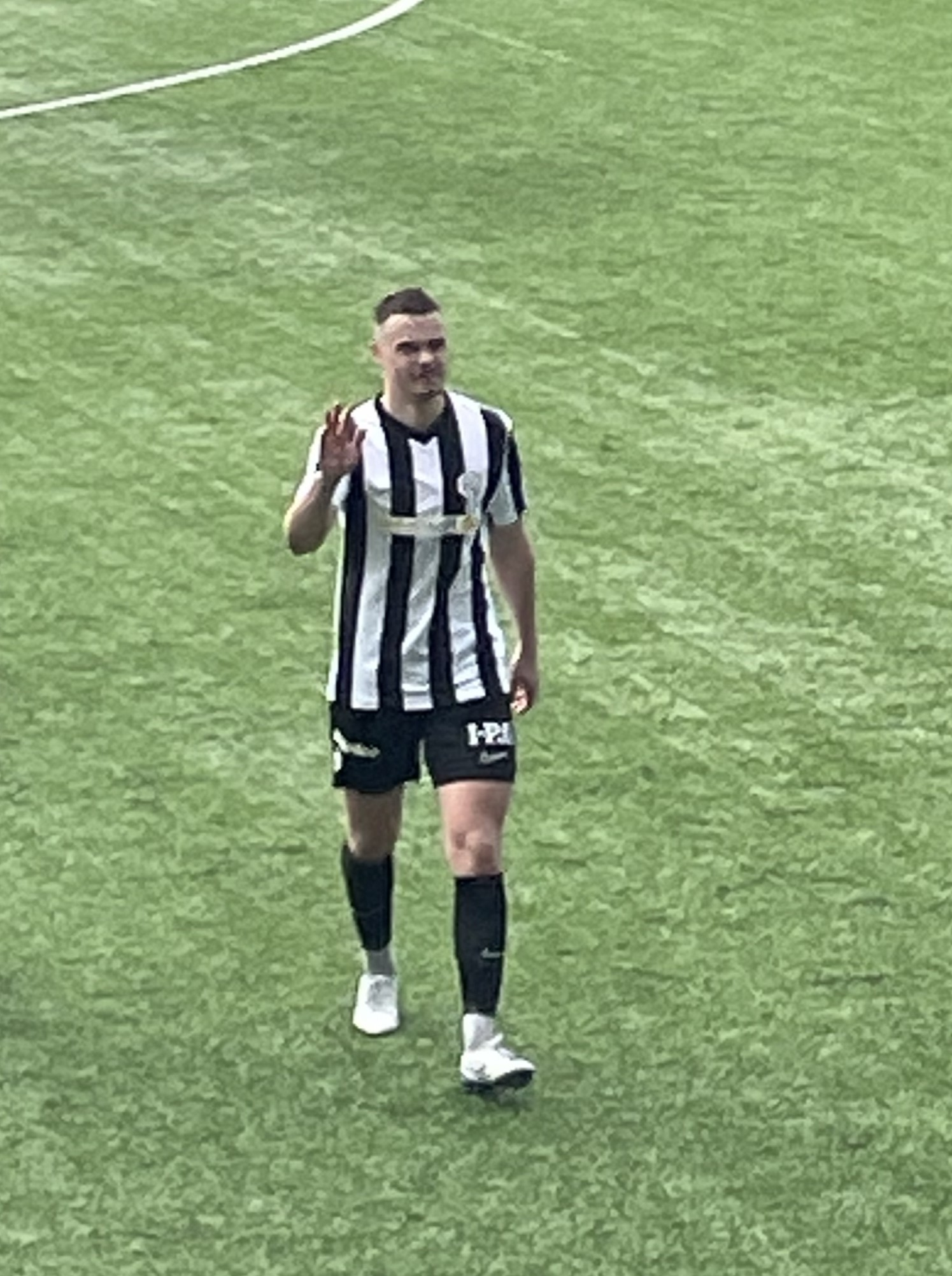
- Martti Haukioja

Personal information
- Full name: Martti Mikael Haukioja
- Date of birth: 6 October 1999 (age 27)
- Place of birth: Kuorevesi, Finland
- Height: 1.88 m (6 ft 2 in)
- Position: Left back

Team information
- Current team: VPS
- Number: 19

Youth career
- –2012: HJS
- 2012–2018: Ilves
- 2017–2018: → Chievo (loan)

Senior career*
Years	Team	Apps	(Gls)
2016–2018	Ilves	8	(0)
2017	→ Jazz (loan)	10	(0)
2018	→ JJK (loan)	7	(1)
2019	VPS	17	(0)
2020–2021	Inter Turku	37	(4)
2022–2023	SJK	17	(0)
2024–	VPS	77	(6)

International career
2016	Finland U17	1	(0)
2016–2017	Finland U18	5	(0)
2017–2018	Finland U19	10	(0)
2019–2020	Finland U21	6	(0)
- * Club domestic league appearances and goals as of 13 November 2026

Martti Mikael Haukioja (born 6 October 1999) is a Finnish professional footballer who plays as a left back for VPS in the Finnish Veikkausliiga. He previously played for FC Inter Turku and visited FC Jazz and the youth ranks of Chievo on loan.

== Career ==
Haukioja signed with VPS for the 2019 season. The deal was confirmed already on 14 November 2018.

After spending two seasons with Inter Turku and two seasons with SJK, Haukioja returned to Vaasa on 14 November 2023, and signed with VPS for the 2024 season, with an option for an additional year. On 29 August, his option was exercised.

== Career statistics ==
As of 27 February 2025

Appearances and goals by club, season and competition
Club	Season	League			Cup (Note: Includes Suomen Cup)		League cup		Europe		Total	
Club	Season	Division	Apps	Goals	Apps	Goals	Apps	Goals	Apps	Goals	Apps	Goals
Ilves II	2016	Kolmonen	8	0	–		–		–		8	0
Ilves II	2017	Kolmonen	1	0	–		–		–		1	0
Ilves II	Total		9	0	0	0	0	0	0	0	9	0
Ilves	2016	Veikkausliiga	3	0	0	0	1	0	–		4	0
Ilves	2017	Veikkausliiga	0	0	1	0	–		–		1	0
Ilves	2018	Veikkausliiga	5	0	–		–		–		5	0
Ilves	Total		8	0	1	0	1	0	0	0	10	0
Jazz (loan)	2017	Kakkonen	10	0	–		–		–		10	0
JJK (loan)	2018	Ykkönen	7	1	–		–		–		7	1
VPS	2019	Veikkausliiga	17	0	8	0	–		–		25	0
Inter Turku	2020	Veikkausliiga	16	0	9	0	–		0	0	25	0
Inter Turku	2021	Veikkausliiga	22	4	5	1	–		0	0	27	5
Inter Turku	Total		38	4	14	1	0	0	0	0	52	5
SJK	2022	Veikkausliiga	13	0	2	0	3	0	0	0	18	0
SJK	2023	Veikkausliiga	4	0	2	0	4	0	–		10	0
SJK	Total		17	0	4	0	7	0	0	0	28	0
SJK Akatemia	2022	Ykkönen	1	0	–		–		–		1	0
SJK Akatemia	2023	Ykkönen	1	0	–		–		–		1	0
SJK Akatemia	Total		2	0	0	0	0	0	0	0	2	0
VPS	2024	Veikkausliiga	27	4	1	1	2	0	2 (Note: Appearances in UEFA Conference League)	0	32	5
VPS	2025	Veikkausliiga	0	0	0	0	2	0	–		2	0
VPS	Total		27	4	1	1	4	0	2	0	34	5
Career total			118	9	28	2	12	0	2	0	160	11
