= Prosper Ahiabu =

Ghanaian professional footballer

Personal information
- Full name: Prosper Ahiabu Deyegbe
- Date of birth: 10 May 1999 (age 27)
- Place of birth: Ghana
- Height: 1.88 m (6 ft 2 in)
- Position: Midfielder

Team information
- Current team: Inter Turku
- Number: 4

Senior career*
Years	Team	Apps	(Gls)
2018–2020	WAFA	39	(1)
2020–2021	Liberty Professionals	17	(0)
2021	AS Soliman	4	(0)
2022–2025	VPS	108	(4)
2026–	Inter Turku	24	(2)

International career
2019	Ghana U20	3	(0)
- * Club domestic league appearances and goals as of 12 November 2026

Prosper Ahiabu Deyegbe (born 10 May 1999) is a Ghanaian footballer who plays as a midfielder for Finnish Veikkausliiga club Inter Turku.

== Career ==
Ahiabu started his career in his native Ghana with West African Football Academy (WAFA) in January 2018. He later joined a fellow Ghana Premier League club Liberty Professionals in February 2021.

After a short stint in Tunisia with AS Soliman, Ahiabu signed with Vaasan Palloseura (VPS) in Finland on 31 March 2022. His contract with VPS was extended on 4 April 2023, on a deal until the end of 2024 with an option for a further year. In the 2023 season, Ahiabu contributed in 27 Veikkausliiga appearances scoring two goals, as VPS finished 3rd in the league and qualified for the 2024–25 UEFA Conference League qualifiers. On 15 April 2024, his deal was extended until the end of 2025. On 11 July, Ahiabu scored a goal for VPS, in a Conference League qualifying loss against Žalgiris.

== International career ==
Ahiabu has made three appearances for the Ghana U20 national team in 2019.

== Career statistics ==
As of 27 February 2025

Appearances and goals by club, season and competition
Club	Season	Division	League		National cup (Note: Includes Suomen Cup)		League cup (Note: Includes Finnish League Cup)		Continental		Total	
Club	Season	Division	Apps	Goals	Apps	Goals	Apps	Goals	Apps	Goals	Apps	Goals
WAFA	2018	Ghana Premier League	14	0	—		—		—		14	0
WAFA	2019	Ghana Premier League	13	1	—		—		—		13	1
WAFA	2019–20	Ghana Premier League	12	0	—		—		—		12	0
WAFA	Total		39	1	0	0	0	0	0	0	39	1
Liberty Professionals	2020–21	Ghana Premier League	17	0	—		—		—		17	0
AS Soliman	2021–22	Tunisian Ligue 1	4	0	—		—		—		4	0
VPS	2022	Veikkausliiga	30	0	4	0	0	0	—		34	0
VPS	2023	Veikkausliiga	27	2	2	0	5	0	—		34	2
VPS	2024	Veikkausliiga	26	0	1	1	5	0	2 (Note: Includes UEFA Conference League)	1	34	2
VPS	2025	Veikkausliiga	0	0	0	0	5	0	–		5	0
VPS	Total		83	2	7	1	15	0	2	1	107	4
Career total			143	3	7	1	15	0	2	1	167	5
