= Pedro Justiniano =

Bissau-Guinean footballer (born 2000)

Personal information
- Full name: Pedro Justiniano Almeida Gomes
- Date of birth: 18 April 2000 (age 26)
- Place of birth: Vicenza, Italy
- Height: 1.90 m (6 ft 3 in)
- Position: Centre-back

Team information
- Current team: Giugliano
- Number: 5

Youth career
- 2012–2014: Vicenza
- 2014–2018: Juventus
- 2017–2018: → Porto (loan)
- 2018–2019: Porto

Senior career*
Years	Team	Apps	(Gls)
2018	Juventus	0	(0)
2018	→ Porto B (loan)	1	(0)
2018–2021	Porto B	38	(0)
2021–2022	Académica	18	(0)
2022–2024	Radomiak Radom	12	(0)
2023–2024	→ Petrolul Ploiești (loan)	7	(0)
2024–2025	VPS	35	(0)
2026–	Giugliano	13	(0)

International career
2015	Italy U15	8	(0)
2015	Portugal U15	2	(0)
2016	Portugal U16	5	(0)
2016–2017	Portugal U17	6	(1)
2018	Portugal U18	1	(0)
2022	Guinea-Bissau	2	(0)
- * Club domestic league appearances and goals as of 1 May 2026

Pedro Justiniano Almeida Gomes (born 18 April 2000) is a professional footballer who plays as a centre-back for Serie C Group C club Giugliano. Born in Italy, he represented his country of birth and Portugal as a youth international, before choosing to represent Guinea-Bissau at senior level.

Justiniano started out his senior career at Porto B in 2018, initially on loan from Juventus. He signed for Académica in 2021, and one year later moved to Polish side Radomiak Radom.

== Club career ==
Born in Italy, Justiniano represented Vicenza, Juventus and Porto at junior level.

On 11 March 2018, while on loan from Juventus, Justiniano made his professional debut for Porto B in a 0–1 LigaPro loss to Académico Viseu.

On 10 July 2022, after spending one season at Académica, he moved to Polish side Radomiak Radom on a three-year contract. On 2 July 2023, Justiniano was sent on a season-long loan to Liga I club Petrolul Ploiești. He was recalled in early January 2024.

On 12 March 2024, Justiniano signed a two-year deal with Finnish side Vaasan Palloseura (VPS) of the Veikkausliiga. After a short hiatus of competitive games, he made one appearance with the club's reserve team in the fifth-tier Kolmonen, before debuting with VPS first team on 27 April 2024 in a Veikkausliiga match against AC Oulu, as a starter in a 2–1 win.

== International career ==
Born in Italy, Justiniano featured his country of birth at under-15 level, before switching his allegiance to Portugal. He represented Portugal at several youth international levels, before making his full debut for Guinea-Bissau senior national team in 2022.

== Personal life ==
Justiniano holds a dual citizenship of Guinea-Bissau and Portugal.

== Career statistics ==
=== Club ===
As of match played 4 January 2026

Appearances and goals by club, season and competition
Club	Season	League			National cup (Note: Includes Taça de Portugal, Polish Cup, Cupa României and Suomen Cup)		Continental		Other		Total	
Club	Season	Division	Apps	Goals	Apps	Goals	Apps	Goals	Apps	Goals	Apps	Goals
Porto B	2017–18	LigaPro	1	0	—		—		—		1	0
Porto B	2018–19	LigaPro	6	0	—		—		—		6	0
Porto B	2019–20	LigaPro	11	0	—		—		—		11	0
Porto B	2020–21	Liga Portugal 2	19	0	—		—		—		19	0
Porto B	Total		37	0	—		—		—		37	0
Académica	2021–22	Liga Portugal 2	18	0	2	0	—		—		20	0
Radomiak Radom	2022–23	Ekstraklasa	12	0	2	0	—		—		14	0
Petrolul Ploiești (loan)	2023–24	Liga I	7	0	1	0	—		—		8	0
VPS	2024	Veikkausliiga	17	0	0	0	2 (Note: Appearances in UEFA Conference League)	0	0	0	19	0
VPS	2025	Veikkausliiga	18	0	2	0	—		1 (Note: Appearances in Finnish League Cup)	0	21	0
VPS	Total		35	0	2	0	2	0	1	0	40	0
VPS II	2024	Kolmonen	1	0	—		—		—		1	0
VPS II	2025	Kakkonen	1	0	—		—		—		1	0
VPS II	Total		2	0	—		—		—		2	0
Giugliano	2025–26	Serie C Group C	1	0	—		—		0	0	1	0
Career total			112	0	7	0	2	0	1	0	122	0

=== International ===
As of match played 20 November 2022

National team	Year	Apps	Goals
Guinea-Bissau
Guinea-Bissau	2022	2	0
Total		2	0

== Honours ==
Porto Youth

- UEFA Youth League: 2018–19
