= 2025 FC Haka season =

Finnish football club season

FC Haka
2025 season
- Veikkausliiga: Pre-season
- Finnish Cup: Pre-season
- Finnish League Cup: Group stage
- UEFA Conference League: Pre-season
- Highest home attendance: 3,780
- Average home league attendance: 2,773

The 2025 season is the 91st overall and fourth consecutive in the Veikkausliiga for the Finnish football club FC Haka. The club will compete in the Finnish Cup, Finnish League Cup and UEFA Europa Conference League qualifiers.

== Squad ==
=== Transfers In ===
Pos.	Player	Transferred from	Fee	Date	Source
FW	(England) James Akintunde	(Republic of Ireland) Bohemians	Free	17 January 2025	
FW	(Brazil) Lucas Falcão	(Croatia) HNK Šibenik	Free	21 January 2025	

=== Transfers Out ===
Pos.	Player	Transferred to	Fee	Date	Source
MF	(Belgium) Evangelos Patoulidis	(Norway) Sandefjord	Undisclosed	21 January 2025	

== Competitions ==
=== Overall record ===
Competition	First match	Last match	Starting round	Record							
Competition	First match	Last match	Starting round	Pld	W	D	L	GF	GA	GD	Win %
Veikkausliiga			Matchday 1	0	0	0	0	0	0	+0	—
Finnish Cup				0	0	0	0	0	0	+0	—
Finnish League Cup	22 January 2025		Group stage	0	0	0	0	0	0	+0	—
Total				0	0	0	0	0	0	+0	—

Source: Competitions

=== Finnish League Cup ===
==== Results by round ====
Round	1
Ground	
Result	
Position	

A = Away; H = Home; W = Win; D = Draw; L = Loss

22 January 2025 1	Haka	v	KTP
14:00 UTC+2
