= Samuel Lindeman =

Finnish footballer (born 1997)

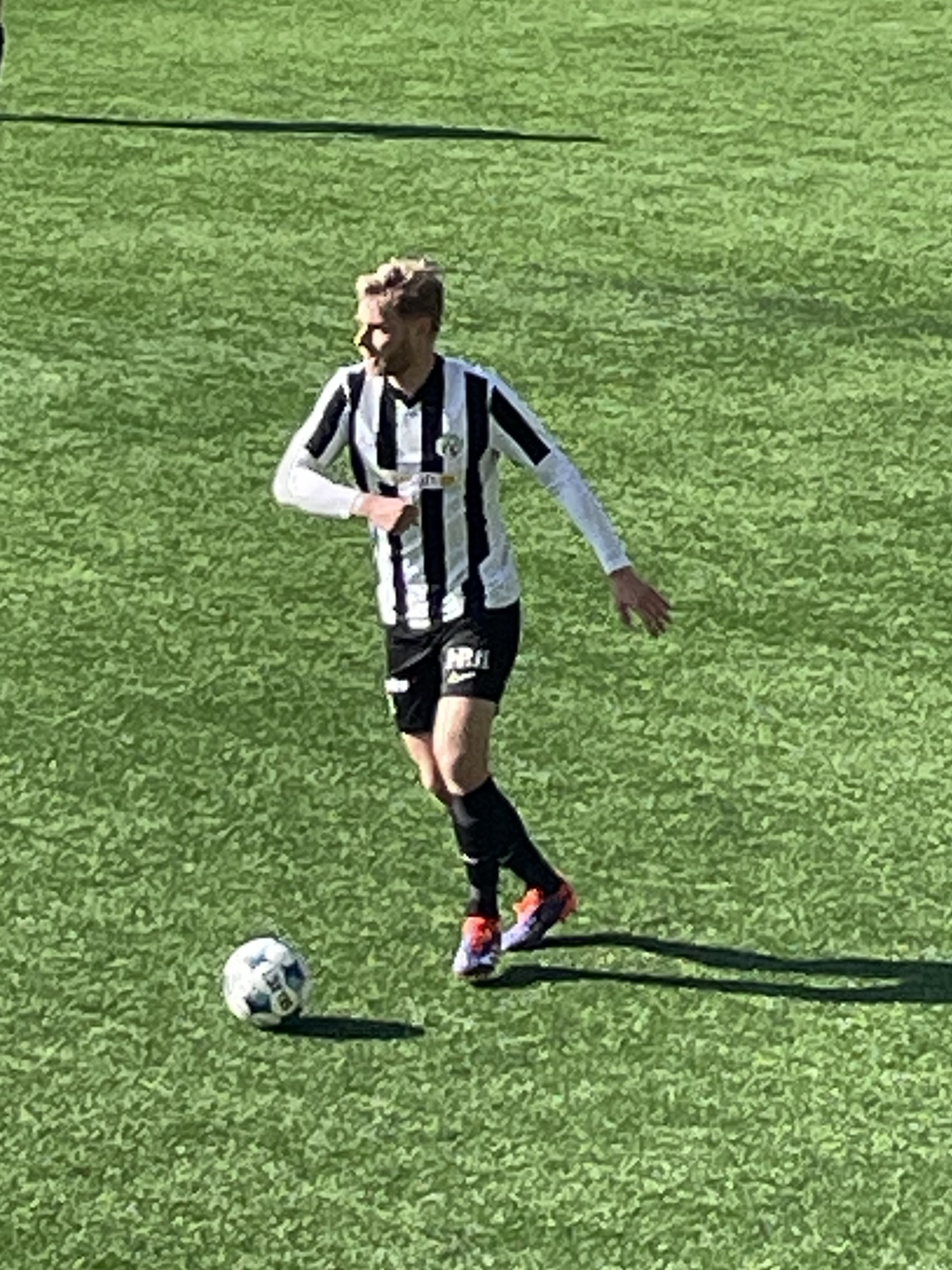
- Samuel Lindeman

Personal information
- Date of birth: 29 December 1997 (age 28)
- Place of birth: Kouvola, Finland
- Height: 1.88 m (6 ft 2 in)
- Positions: Defensive midfielder; centre back

Youth career
- Sudet
- MYPA

Senior career*
Years	Team	Apps	(Gls)
2013	Sudet II	1	(0)
2014	Peltirumpu	5	(0)
2015	Sudet	2	(0)
2016	Purha	4	(0)
2016–2020	MyPa	68	(12)
2021–2025	VPS	83	(3)
- * Club domestic league appearances and goals as of 20 November 2025

Samuel Lindeman (born 29 December 1997) is a Finnish former professional footballer who played as a midfielder and defender.

== Club career ==
Lindeman started football in his hometown Kouvola and played in the lower divisions in the Finnish football league system for Sudet, Peltirumpu and Inkeroisten Purha.

He signed with MYPA for the 2017 season in the fourth-tier Kolmonen. The club won two consecutive promotions and earned a spot to the second-tier Ykkönen for the 2019 season.

Lindeman left MYPA after the 2020 season, after the club were relegated to Kakkonen, and signed with Vaasan Palloseura (VPS) in Ykkönen. At the end of his first season with VPS, the club won the Ykkönen title and were promoted to top-tier Veikkausliiga. In October 2022, Lindeman signed a contract extension with VPS. In the 2023 season, VPS finished 3rd in the Veikkausliiga table and qualified for the 2024–25 UEFA Conference League qualifiers. Lindeman suffered an injury and missed the first half of the 2024 season. He scored his first Veikkausliiga goal on 20 September 2024, an equalizer in a 1–1 home draw against HJK Helsinki. He scored his second league goal in the next round, in a 4–1 away win in a derby against SJK Seinäjoki on 28 September.

After the 2025 season, Lindeman retired from his professional football career and started working as a carsalesman.

== Career statistics ==
As of 31 December 2025

Appearances and goals by club, season and competition
Club	Season	League			National cup (Note: Includes Suomen Cup)		League cup (Note: Includes Finnish League Cup)		Europe		Total	
Club	Season	Division	Apps	Goals	Apps	Goals	Apps	Goals	Apps	Goals	Apps	Goals
Sudet 2	2013	Kolmonen	1	0	–		–		–		1	0
Peltirumpu	2015	Kolmonen	5	0	–		–		–		5	0
Sudet	2016	Kakkonen	2	0	–		–		–		2	0
Inkeroisten Purha	2016	Kolmonen	4	0	–		–		–		4	0
MYPA	2017	Kolmonen	16	9	4	0	–		–		20	9
MYPA	2018	Kakkonen	14	1	0	0	–		–		14	1
MYPA	2019	Ykkönen	23	2	0	0	–		–		23	2
MYPA	2020	Ykkönen	15	0	3	2	–		–		18	2
MYPA	Total		68	12	7	2	0	0	0	0	75	14
VPS	2021	Ykkönen	25	1	4	0	–		–		29	1
VPS	2022	Veikkausliiga	25	0	3	0	3	0	–		31	0
VPS	2023	Veikkausliiga	18	0	3	0	0	0	–		21	0
VPS	2024	Veikkausliiga	11	2	2	0	0	0	0	0	13	2
VPS	2025	Veikkausliiga	4	0	1	0	5	0	–		10	0
VPS	Total		83	3	13	0	8	0	0	0	104	3
Career total			163	15	20	2	8	0	0	0	191	17

== Honours ==
MYPA

- Kakkonen, Group A: 2018
- Kolmonen, Kaakkois Suomi: 2017

VPS

- Ykkönen: 2021
