= Lucas von Hellens =

Finnish footballer (born 2005)

Personal information
- Full name: Júlio Lucas Freitas von Hellens
- Date of birth: 5 March 2005 (age 21)
- Place of birth: Funchal, Portugal
- Height: 1.87 m (6 ft 2 in)
- Position: Centre back

Team information
- Current team: Gnistan
- Number: 5

Youth career
- –2014: ADRC Os Xavelhas
- 2015–2017: Marítimo
- 2017–2021: Benfica
- 2021–2022: Marítimo

Senior career*
Years	Team	Apps	(Gls)
2023–2025	Marítimo B	17	(0)
2025–	Gnistan	5	(0)

International career^{‡}
2019	Finland U15	3	(0)
2021	Finland U17	6	(1)
2022	Finland U18	4	(0)
2023	Finland U19	1	(0)
2024	Finland U21	2	(0)
- * Club domestic league appearances and goals as of 19 November 2025 ‡ National team caps and goals as of 11 July 2025

Júlio Lucas Freitas von Hellens (born 5 March 2005) is a Finnish professional footballer who plays as a centre back for Veikkausliiga club Gnistan.

== Personal life ==
Born and raised in Madeira, Portugal, von Hellens is of Finnish and Portuguese descent. He is a Finnish youth international. His father Alberto is a former hurdler who represented Finland at the Finland–Sweden Athletics International competitions. His younger brother Tomas is a football goalkeeper who plays for Maritimo.
