= Jesper Engström =

Finnish footballer (born 1992)

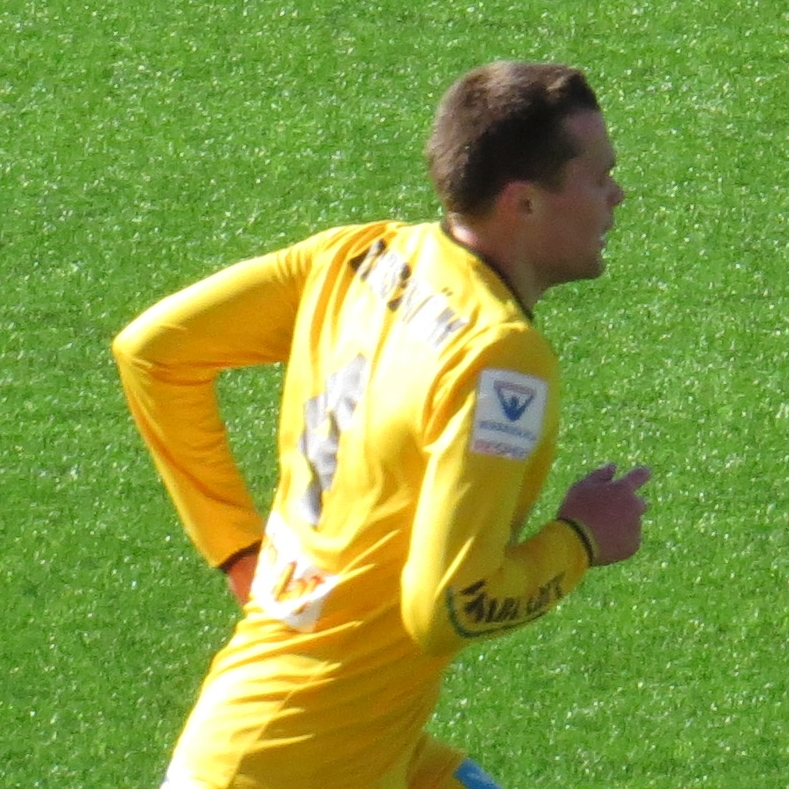
- Engström with VPS in 2015

Personal information
- Date of birth: 24 April 1992 (age 34)
- Place of birth: Vörå, Finland
- Height: 1.73 m (5 ft 8 in)
- Position: Left back

Team information
- Current team: VPS
- Number: 4

Youth career
- Hellnäs BK
- Norrvalla FF
- 2007–2008: Vasa IFK

Senior career*
Years	Team	Apps	(Gls)
2009	Norrvalla FF	24	(3)
2010	Vasa IFK	25	(7)
2011–2019	VPS	204	(3)
2016	→ YPA (loan)	2	(0)
2020–2021	Inter Turku	38	(3)
2022–	VPS	79	(4)
- * Club domestic league appearances and goals as of 20 November 2025

Jesper Engström (born 24 April 1992) is a Finnish professional footballer who plays as a defender and captains the Veikkausliiga club Vaasan Palloseura (VPS).

== Career ==
On 13 November 2019 Inter Turku confirmed that Engström would join the club for the 2020 season, signing a deal until the end of the year with an option for one further year.

In November 2021, it was announced that he would return to VPS for the 2022 season.

== Personal life ==
Engström was diagnosed with lymphoma in January 2013. He eventually survived the cancer with cytostatic treatment.

== Career statistics ==
As of 27 February 2025

Appearances and goals by club, season and competition
Club	Season	League			Cup (Note: Includes Suomen Cup)		League cup (Note: Includes Finnish League Cup)		Europe		Total	
Club	Season	Division	Apps	Goals	Apps	Goals	Apps	Goals	Apps	Goals	Apps	Goals
Norrvalla FF	2009	Kakkonen	24	3	–		–		–		24	3
VIFK	2010	Kakkonen	25	7	–		–		–		25	7
VPS	2011	Veikkausliiga	27	0	0	0	2	0	–		29	0
VPS	2012	Veikkausliiga	24	1	2	0	7	0	–		33	1
VPS	2013	Veikkausliiga	23	0	2	0	3	0	–		28	0
VPS	2014	Veikkausliiga	31	0	1	0	7	1	2 (Note: Appearances in UEFA Europa League)	0	41	1
VPS	2015	Veikkausliiga	29	0	1	0	0	0	2	0	32	0
VPS	2016	Veikkausliiga	16	0	2	0	4	0	–		22	0
VPS	2017	Veikkausliiga	29	2	5	0	–		4	0	38	0
VPS	2018	Veikkausliiga	16	0	6	0	–		–		22	0
VPS	2019	Veikkausliiga	9	0	1	0	–		–		10	0
VPS	Total		204	3	20	0	23	1	8	0	255	4
VPS Akatemia	2019	Kakkonen	2	0	–		–		–		2	0
FC YPA (loan)	2016	Kakkonen	2	0	–		–		–		2	0
Inter Turku	2020	Veikkausliiga	15	1	8	0	–		1	0	24	1
Inter Turku	2021	Veikkausliiga	23	2	3	0	–		1 (Note: Appearances in UEFA Conference League)	0	27	2
Inter Turku	Total		38	3	11	0	0	0	2	0	51	3
VPS	2022	Veikkausliiga	22	2	2	0	3	0	–		27	0
VPS	2023	Veikkausliiga	22	0	2	0	4	0	–		28	0
VPS	2024	Veikkausliiga	20	1	1	0	5	0	2	0	28	1
VPS	2025	Veikkausliiga	0	0	0	0	5	0	–		5	0
VPS	Total		64	3	5	0	17	0	2	0	88	3
Career total			259	19	36	0	40	1	12	0	347	20
