= Samu Alanko =

Finnish footballer (born 1998)

Personal information
- Full name: Samu Jesperi Alanko
- Date of birth: 16 May 1998 (age 28)
- Place of birth: Finland
- Height: 1.84 m (6 ft 0 in)
- Positions: Winger; forward

Team information
- Current team: Jerv
- Number: 77

Youth career
- VPS

Senior career*
Years	Team	Apps	(Gls)
2015–2016	VPS	2	(0)
2015	→ Kiisto (loan)	9	(0)
2016	→ Jaro (loan)	9	(7)
2017	First Vienna	9	(2)
2017–2018	Austria II	19	(2)
2018–2020	VPS	43	(8)
2021–2022	AC Oulu	29	(2)
2022–2024	VPS	61	(6)
2025–	Jerv	36	(7)
- * Club domestic league appearances and goals as of 15 November 2026

Samu Jesperi Alanko (born 16 May 1998) is a Finnish footballer who plays as a winger or attacker for Norwegian club Jerv.

== Career ==
Alanko started his career with Finnish top flight side VPS, where he made 9 appearances and scored 1 goal. On 11 February 2015, Alanko debuted for VPS during a 0–1 loss to SJK. On 20 February 2016, he scored his first goal for VPS during a 2–0 win over Kemi City FC.

In 2015, Alanko is sent on loan to Kiisto in the Finnish third division.

In 2016, he was sent on loan to Finnish second division club Jaro.

In 2018, he returned to VPS in the Finnish top flight after playing for Austrian third division team Austria II.

On 13 July 2022, Alanko returned to VPS once again, this time from AC Oulu.

For the 2025 season, Alanko moved to Norway and signed with Jerv in 2. divisjon. He revealed his spouse was already living in Norway.

== Career statistics ==
As of 22 July 2026

Appearances and goals by club, season and competition
Club	Season	League			Cup (Note: Includes Suomen Cup)		League cup (Note: Includes Finnish League Cup)		Europe		Total	
Club	Season	Division	Apps	Goals	Apps	Goals	Apps	Goals	Apps	Goals	Apps	Goals
VPS	2015	Veikkausliiga	1	0	1	0	4	0	1 (Note: Appearance(s) in UEFA Europa League)	0	7	0
VPS	2016	Veikkausliiga	1	0	0	0	3	1	–		4	1
VPS	Total		2	0	1	0	7	1	1	0	11	1
Kiisto (loan)	2015	Kakkonen	9	0	–		–		–		9	0
Jaro (loan)	2016	Ykkönen	9	7	–		–		–		9	7
First Vienna	2016–17	Austrian Regionalliga	9	2	–		–		–		9	2
Austria Wien II	2017–18	Austrian Regionalliga	19	2	–		–		–		19	2
VPS	2018	Veikkausliiga	9	0	–		–		–		9	0
VPS	2019	Veikkausliiga	16	2	8	1	–		–		24	3
VPS	2020	Ykkönen	18	5	5	0	–		–		23	5
VPS	Total		43	7	13	1	0	0	0	0	56	8
VPS Akatemia	2018	Kolmonen	2	2	–		–		–		2	2
VPS Akatemia	2019	Kakkonen	2	0	–		–		–		2	0
VPS Akatemia	Total		4	2	0	0	0	0	0	0	4	2
AC Oulu	2021	Veikkausliiga	27	2	3	0	–		–		30	2
AC Oulu	2022	Veikkausliiga	2	0	1	0	2	0	–		5	0
AC Oulu	Total		29	2	4	0	2	0	0	0	35	2
OLS	2022	Kakkonen	7	6	–		–		–		7	6
VPS	2022	Veikkausliiga	16	2	–		–		–		16	2
VPS	2023	Veikkausliiga	19	2	3	0	5	1	–		27	3
VPS	2024	Veikkausliiga	26	2	2	0	4	1	2 (Note: Appearances in UEFA Conference League)	0	34	3
VPS	Total		61	6	5	0	9	2	2	0	77	8
VPS Akatemia	2023	Kolmonen	1	0	–		–		–		1	0
Jerv	2025	2. divisjon	21	0	2	0	–		–		23	0
Jerv	2026	2. divisjon	11	3	0	0	–		–		11	3
Jerv	Total		32	3	2	0	0	0	0	0	34	3
Career total			225	37	25	1	18	3	3	0	269	41
