= Lucas Cini =

Brazilian footballer (born 1999)

Lucas Falcão
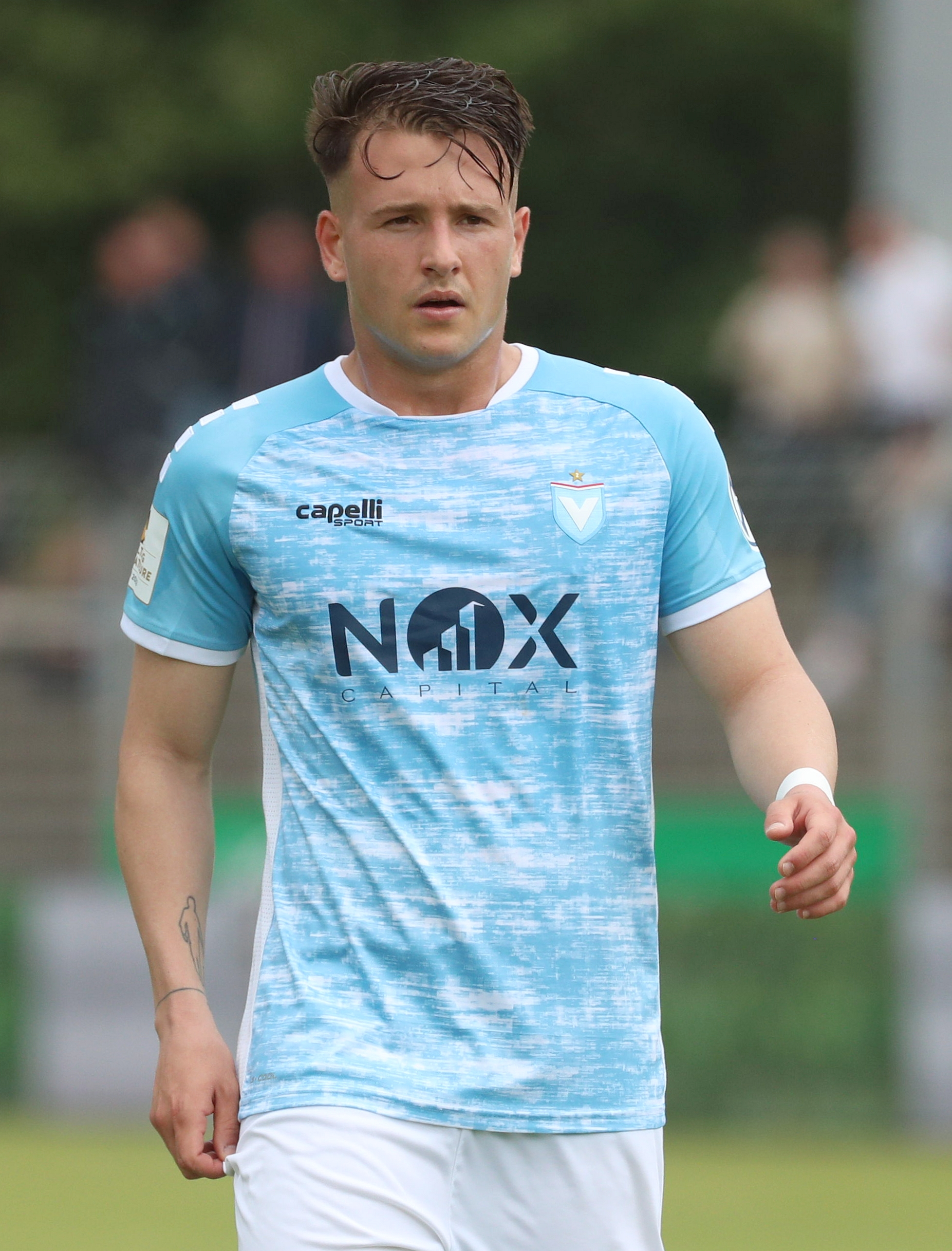
- Falcão with Viktoria Berlin in 2022

Personal information
- Full name: Lucas Bradley Falcão Cini
- Date of birth: 21 October 1999 (age 27)
- Place of birth: Cuiabá, Brazil
- Height: 1.75 m (5 ft 9 in)
- Position: Forward

Team information
- Current team: Rot-Weiß Erfurt
- Number: 55

Youth career
- 2013–2016: Boca United
- 2016–2017: Portland Timbers

Senior career*
Years	Team	Apps	(Gls)
2017–2018	Portland Timbers 2	2	(0)
2019	Estepona	13	(2)
2019–2022	Viktoria Berlin	61	(13)
2022	Irodotos	4	(0)
2023	Oskarshamn	13	(2)
2023–2024	Viktoria Berlin	32	(15)
2024	Šibenik	0	(0)
2025	Haka	18	(2)
2026–	Rot-Weiß Erfurt	20	(6)
- * Club domestic league appearances and goals as of 23 September 2026

Lucas Bradley Falcão Cini (born 21 October 1999), known as Lucas Falcão or Lucas Cini, is a Brazilian footballer who plays as a forward for German Regionalliga Nordost club Rot-Weiß Erfurt.

== Career ==
Cini joined United Soccer League side Portland Timbers 2 after spending time with the Portland Timbers academy. His first appearance came on 5 May 2017 vs. Seattle Sounders FC 2. In total, however, he only made two appearances for Timbers 2.

He then joined Spanish sixth-tier side CD Estepona FS in the winter of 2019.

On 28 June 2019, he joined Regionalliga side FC Viktoria Berlin. He made ten league appearances for Viktoria Berlin in the shortened 2020–21 season, and scored three goals. In the shortened season, Viktoria Berlin won all 11 of their games and won promotion to the 3. Liga.

After stints in Greek second-tier with Irodotos, Swedish third-tier with Oskarshamns AIK and in Croatia with Šibenik, he signed with Finnish Veikkausliiga club Haka in January 2025.

== Career statistics ==
As of 29 June 2026

Appearances and goals by club, season and competition
Club	Season	League			Cup (Note: Includes DFB-Pokal, Svenska Cupen, Croatian Cup and Suomen Cup)		League cup (Note: Includes Berlin Cup and Finnish League Cup)		Total	
Club	Season	Division	Apps	Goals	Apps	Goals	Apps	Goals	Apps	Goals
Portland Timbers 2	2017	United Soccer League	1	0	–		–		1	0
Portland Timbers 2	2018	United Soccer League	1	0	–		–		1	0
Portland Timbers 2	Total		2	0	0	0	0	0	2	0
Estepona	2018–19	Division Honor Andaluza Gr. 2	13	2	–		–		13	2
Viktoria Berlin	2019–20	Regionalliga Nordost	19	4	0	0	7	3	26	7
Viktoria Berlin	2020–21	Regionalliga Nordost	10	3	–		4	1	14	4
Viktoria Berlin	2021–22	3. Liga	32	6	–		4	5	36	11
Viktoria Berlin	Total		61	13	0	0	15	9	76	22
Irodotos	2022–23	Super League Greece 2	4	0	–		–		4	0
Oskarshamns AIK	2023	Ettan	13	2	4	1	–		17	3
Viktoria Berlin	2023–24	Regionalliga Nordost	32	15	–		6	7	38	22
Šibenik	2024–25	HNL	0	0	1	0	–		1	0
Haka	2025	Veikkausliiga	18	2	5	5	4	0	27	7
Rot-Weiß Erfurt	2025–2026	Regionalliga	15	6	0	0	1	0	16	6
Career total			158	40	10	6	26	16	194	62

== Honours ==
Viktoria Berlin

- Regionalliga Nordost: 2020–21
- Berlin Cup: 2021–22, 2023–24
