= Jarkko Jokiranta =

Finnish football coach (born 1984)

Personal information
- Date of birth: 17 May 1984 (age 42)
- Place of birth: Elimäki, Finland
- Position: Defensive midfielder

Team information
- Current team: Gnistan (sporting director)

Youth career
- MYPA

Senior career*
Years	Team	Apps	(Gls)
- Elimäen Villisiat
- City Stars
- JPS

Managerial career
- 2024–2026: Gnistan (sporting director)
- 2027–: Gnistan (technical director)
- * Club domestic league appearances and goals as of 6 June 2024

Jarkko Jokiranta (born 17 May 1984) is a Finnish sports coach and a former player, currently working as a technical director of IF Gnistan in Veikkausliiga.

== Playing career ==
Jokiranta has played in the youth sector of MyPa. As a senior player, he played for Elimäen Villisiat, City Stars and JPS in lower divisions.

== Career ==
While studying in Pajulahti, Jokiranta also worked as a youth coach for JyPK girls' teams in Jyväskylä.

He started as a youth director of JJK Jyväskylä in 2011. He has also worked as a youth talent coach for the club, before he joined HJK Helsinki as a talent coach in August 2017. On 17 September 2021, he started to work for Finnish FA as a director of club development in the Southern Finland.

On 4 October 2023, a newly promoted Veikkausliiga club IF Gnistan announced the appointment of Jokiranta as their new sporting director, starting in the position for the 2024 season. He is also responsible of developing the club's youth sector. His contract includes an unusual option for transforming the head coach in 2027.

== Personal life ==
Jokiranta has studied in the Pajulahti Sports Institute. In 2012, he graduated from the Faculty of Sport and Health Sciences at the University of Jyväskylä.
