= Adam Jouhi =

Finnish footballer (born 2006)

Personal information
- Date of birth: 20 September 2006 (age 20)
- Place of birth: Espoo, Finland
- Height: 1.77 m (5 ft 10 in)
- Position: Central midfielder

Team information
- Current team: Gnistan
- Number: 31

Youth career
- –2023: Honka

Senior career*
Years	Team	Apps	(Gls)
2023	Honka II	0	(0)
2024–2025	Käpylän Pallo	52	(2)
2026–	Gnistan	30	(3)

International career^{‡}
2026–	Finland U21		
- * Club domestic league appearances and goals as of 13 November 2026 ‡ National team caps and goals as of 29 September 2026

Adam Jouhi (born 20 September 2006) is a Finnish professional football player who plays as a central midfielder for Veikkausliiga side Gnistan.
