= Ruxi =

Spanish footballer

Personal information
- Full name: Roger Bonet Badía
- Date of birth: 11 April 1995 (age 31)
- Place of birth: Valls, Spain
- Height: 1.80 m (5 ft 11 in)
- Position: Centre-back

Team information
- Current team: IF Gnistan
- Number: 3

Youth career
- –2014: Gimnàstic Tarragona

Senior career*
Years	Team	Apps	(Gls)
2014–2016	Pobla Mafumet	57	(4)
2016	Olot	0	(0)
2017–2018	Gimnàstic Tarragona	0	(0)
2017–2018	→ Rápido de Bouzas (loan)	10	(0)
2018–2019	Formentera	41	(0)
2019	Afturelding	10	(1)
2020	KTP	20	(2)
2021	AC Oulu	26	(1)
2022	Inter Turku	27	(3)
2023	Tulsa	31	(0)
2024	Mineros de Zacatecas	12	(0)
2024–2025	PSIS Semarang	20	(0)
2025–2026	Madura United	34	(0)
2026–	IF Gnistan	13	(1)
- * Club domestic league appearances and goals as of 13 November 2026

Roger Bonet Badía (born 11 April 1995), commonly known as Ruxi, is a Spanish professional footballer who plays as a centre-back for Finnish Veikkausliiga club IF Gnistan. He also has a UEFA Pro coaching license. Besides Spain, he has played in Iceland, Finland, United States, Mexico, and Indonesia.

== Club career ==
Ruxi started his career in his native Spain in 2014 and played there until 2019. He represented Pobla Mafumet, Olot, Gimnàstic Tarragona, Rápido de Bouzas and Formentera.

In 2019, he moved abroad and joined Icelandic club Afturelding, competing in the country's second tier.

During 2020–2022, Ruxi played in Finland. First he joined Kotkan Työväen Palloilijat in second-tier Ykkönen. For the 2021 season, he moved to Veikkausliiga club AC Oulu, and continued to Inter Turku, which he represented in the UEFA Conference League qualifiers. Ruxi helped Inter also to advance to the finals of the Finnish Cup and Finnish League Cup.

In February 2023, Ruxi signed with FC Tulsa in USL Championship.

On 30 June 2024, PSIS Semarang brought in Ruxi ahead of the 2024–25 Liga 1 competition. Ruxi made his debut on 11 August 2024 in a match against Persita Tangerang at the Moch. Soebroto Stadium, Magelang.

== Personal life ==
While playing in Finland, Ruxi learned the Finnish language and became a fluent speaker.

== Career statistics ==
As of 23 May 2026

Appearances and goals by club, season and competition
Club	Season	League			Cup		League cup		Continental		Total	
Club	Season	Division	Apps	Goals	Apps	Goals	Apps	Goals	Apps	Goals	Apps	Goals
Pobla Mafumet	2014–15	Tercera División	26	1	–		–		–		26	1
Pobla Mafumet	2015–16	Segunda División B	0	0	–		–		–		0	0
Pobla Mafumet	2016–17	Tercera División	31	3	–		–		–		31	3
Pobla Mafumet	Total		57	4	0	0	0	0	0	0	57	4
Gimnàstic Tarragona	2017–18	Segunda División	0	0	0	0	–		–		0	0
Rápido de Bouzas (loan)	2017–18	Segunda División B	10	0	1	0	1	0	–		12	0
Formentera	2018–19	Tercera División	41	0	0	0	3	0	–		44	0
Afturelding	2019	1. deild karla	10	1	0	0	–		–		10	1
KTP	2020	Ykkönen	22	2	6	0	–		–		28	2
AC Oulu	2021	Veikkausliiga	27	1	3	0	–		–		30	1
Inter Turku	2022	Veikkausliiga	27	3	5	0	6	0	2 (Note: Appearances in UEFA Conference League)	0	40	3
Tulsa	2023	USL Championship	31	0	–		–		–		31	0
Mineros de Zacatecas	2023–24	Liga de Expansión MX	12	0	–		–		–		12	0
PSIS Semarang	2024–25	Liga 1	20	0	–		–		–		20	0
Madura United	2025–26	Super League	34	0	0	0	–		–		34	0
Career total			291	11	15	0	10	0	2	0	318	11

== Honours ==
Inter Turku

- Finnish Cup runner-up: 2022
- Finnish League Cup runner-up: 2022
