= Johannes Ström =

Finnish footballer (born 1990)

Personal information
- Full name: Johannes Carl Wilhelm Ström
- Date of birth: 30 October 1990 (age 36)
- Place of birth: Mustasaari, Finland
- Height: 1.88 m (6 ft 2 in)
- Position: Goalkeeper

Team information
- Current team: Pors 2
- Number: 1

Senior career*
Years	Team	Apps	(Gls)
2012–2015	VIFK	35	(0)
2012	→ Närpes Kraft (loan)	4	(0)
2016	GrIFK	18	(0)
2017	JBK	1	(0)
2017	Jaro	4	(0)
2019–2020	VIFK	10	(0)
2022	Stockholm Internazionale	8	(0)
2023	Ängelholm	4	(0)
2023–2025	Europa Point	33	(0)
2025–	Pors 2	2	(0)
- * Club domestic league appearances and goals as of 5 May 2025

Johannes Carl Wilhelm Ström (born 30 October 1990) is a Finnish professional football goalkeeper, playing for Norwegian side Pors 2.

== Career statistics ==
As of 16 March 2025.

Appearances and goals by club, season and competition
Club	Season	League			Cup (Note: Includes Suomen Cup, Svenska Cupen and Gibraltar Rock Cup)		Other		Total	
Club	Season	Division	Apps	Goals	Apps	Goals	Apps	Goals	Apps	Goals
VIFK	2012	Kakkonen	2	0	–		–		2	0
VIFK	2013	Kakkonen	3	0	0	0	–		3	0
VIFK	2014	Kakkonen	25	0	2	0	–		27	0
VIFK	2015	Ykkönen	6	0	1	0	–		7	0
VIFK	Total		36	0	3	0	0	0	39	0
Närpes Kraft (loan)	2012	Kakkonen	4	0	–		–		4	0
GrIFK	2016	Ykkönen	18	0	0	0	–		18	0
Jaro	2017	Ykkönen	4	0	0	0	–		4	0
Jakobstads BK	2017	Kakkonen	1	0	–		–		1	0
Närpes Kraft	2019	Kolmonen	0	0	–		1 (Note: Appearance(s) in UEFA Regions' Cup)	0	1	0
Närpes Kraft II	2019	Nelonen	1	0	–		–		1	0
VIFK	2019	Kakkonen	10	0	–		–		10	0
VIFK	2020	Kakkonen	0	0	–		–		0	0
VIFK	Total		10	0	0	0	0	0	10	0
Stockholm Internazionale	2021	Division 2			3	0	–		3	0
Stockholm Internazionale	2022	Ettan	8	0	1	0	–		9	0
Stockholm Internazionale	Total		8	0	4	0	0	0	12	0
Ängelholms FF	2023	Ettan	4	0	–		–		4	0
Europa Point	2023–24	Gibraltar Football League	20	0	1	0	–		21	0
Europa Point	2024–25	Gibraltar Football League	13	0	1	0	–		14	0
Europa Point	Total		33	0	2	0	0	0	35	0
Pors 2	2025	3. divisjon	2	0	–		–		2	0
Career total			121	0	9	0	1	0	131	0
