= Marko Kolsi =

Finnish footballer (born 1985)

Personal information
- Full name: Marko Tuomas Kolsi
- Date of birth: 20 January 1985 (age 41)
- Place of birth: Vantaa, Finland
- Height: 1.85 m (6 ft 1 in)
- Position: Midfielder

Team information
- Current team: Lahti (sporting director)

Senior career*
Years	Team	Apps	(Gls)
2001–2002	Jokrut	4	(1)
2002–2003	Jokerit	23	(2)
2004–2006	Willem II	17	(0)
2005–2006	→ TOP Oss (loan)	7	(0)
2006–2007	Eindhoven	4	(0)
2007–2008	Maribor	7	(0)
2008–2011	Rudar Velenje	46	(2)
2011	Šmartno 1928	11	(1)
2012	Willem II	0	(0)
2012–2013	Celje	20	(0)
2013	KäPa	7	(2)
2014	Honka	0	(0)
2014	PK-35 Vantaa	14	(0)
2016–2019	VJS	72	(42)

International career
- Finland U17
- Finland U19
- Finland U21

Managerial career
- 2020: Gnistan (assistant)
- 2020–2023: Gnistan (chief executive officer)
- 2025–: Lahti (sporting director)
- * Club domestic league appearances and goals as of 19 August 2019

Marko Kolsi (born 20 January 1985) is a Finnish football coach and a former footballer. He is currently the sporting director of Veikkausliiga club Lahti.

== Career ==
Kolsi, a midfielder, joined Willem II in the summer of 2004 after previously playing for FC Jokerit in the Finnish Veikkausliiga. He left the Dutch club in 2006 and joined TOP Oss, and later FC Eindhoven. In summer 2007 he went to Slovenia where he played for NK Maribor and NK Rudar Velenje in the Slovenian PrvaLiga. Kolsi made a brief return to his old club Willem II in January 2012, before returning to Slovenia, signing for NK Celje for the 2012–13 season.

He was part of the Finnish under-17 team at the 2002 UEFA European Under-17 Football Championship.

== Coaching career ==
Later Kolsi has worked as a youth coach for PK-35, VJS and PPJ.

He was the chief executive officer of Gnistan from January 2020 until the end of 2023.

== Career statistics ==
As of 1 September 2024.

Appearances and goals by club, season and competition
Club	Season	League			Cup (Note: Includes Suomen Cup and Slovenian Cup)		League cup (Note: Includes Finnish League Cup)		Europe		Total	
Club	Season	Division	Apps	Goals	Apps	Goals	Apps	Goals	Apps	Goals	Apps	Goals
Jokrut	2001	Ykkönen	4	1	–		–		–		4	1
Jokerit	2002	Ykkönen	7	2	–		–		–		7	2
Jokerit	2003	Veikkausliiga	16	0	–		–		–		16	0
Jokerit	Total		23	2	0	0	0	0	0	0	23	2
Willem II	2004–05	Eredivisie	14	0	–		–		–		14	0
Willem II	2005–06	Eredivisie	3	0	–		–		2 (Note: Appearances in UEFA Cup)	0	5	0
Willem II	Total		17	0	0	0	0	0	2	0	19	0
TOP Oss (loan)	2005–06	Eerste Divisie	7	0	–		–		–		7	0
FC Eindhoven	2006–07	Eerste Divisie	4	0	–		–		–		4	0
Maribor	2007–08	Slovenian PrvaLiga	7	0	–		–		–		7	0
Rudar Velenje	2008–09	Slovenian PrvaLiga	24	0	1	0	–		–		25	0
Rudar Velenje	2009–10	Slovenian PrvaLiga	8	1	–		–		4 (Note: Appearances in UEFA Europa League)	0	12	1
Rudar Velenje	2010–11	Slovenian PrvaLiga	6	0	–		–		–		6	0
Rudar Velenje	Total		38	1	1	0	0	0	4	0	43	1
Šmartno 1928	2011–12	Slovenian Second League	11	1	–		–		–		11	1
Willem II	2011–12	Eredivisie	0	0	0	0	–		–		0	0
Celje	2012–13	Slovenian PrvaLiga	20	0	2	0	–		2	0	24	0
KäPa	2013	Kakkonen	7	2	–		–		–		7	2
Honka	2014	Veikkausliiga	0	0	0	0	4	1	–		4	1
PK-35 Vantaa	2014	Ykkönen	14	0	1	0	–		–		15	0
VJS	2016	Nelonen	20	18	–		–		–		20	18
VJS	2017	Nelonen	21	17	–		–		4 (Note: Appearances in UEFA Regions' Cup)	4	25	21
VJS	2018	Kolmonen	14	4	–		–		6	3	20	7
VJS	2019	Kakkonen	17	3	1	0	–		–		18	3
VJS	Total		72	42	1	0	0	0	10	7	83	49
Career total			224	51	5	0	4	1	18	7	251	59
