= Teppo Marttinen =

Finnish footballer (born 1997)

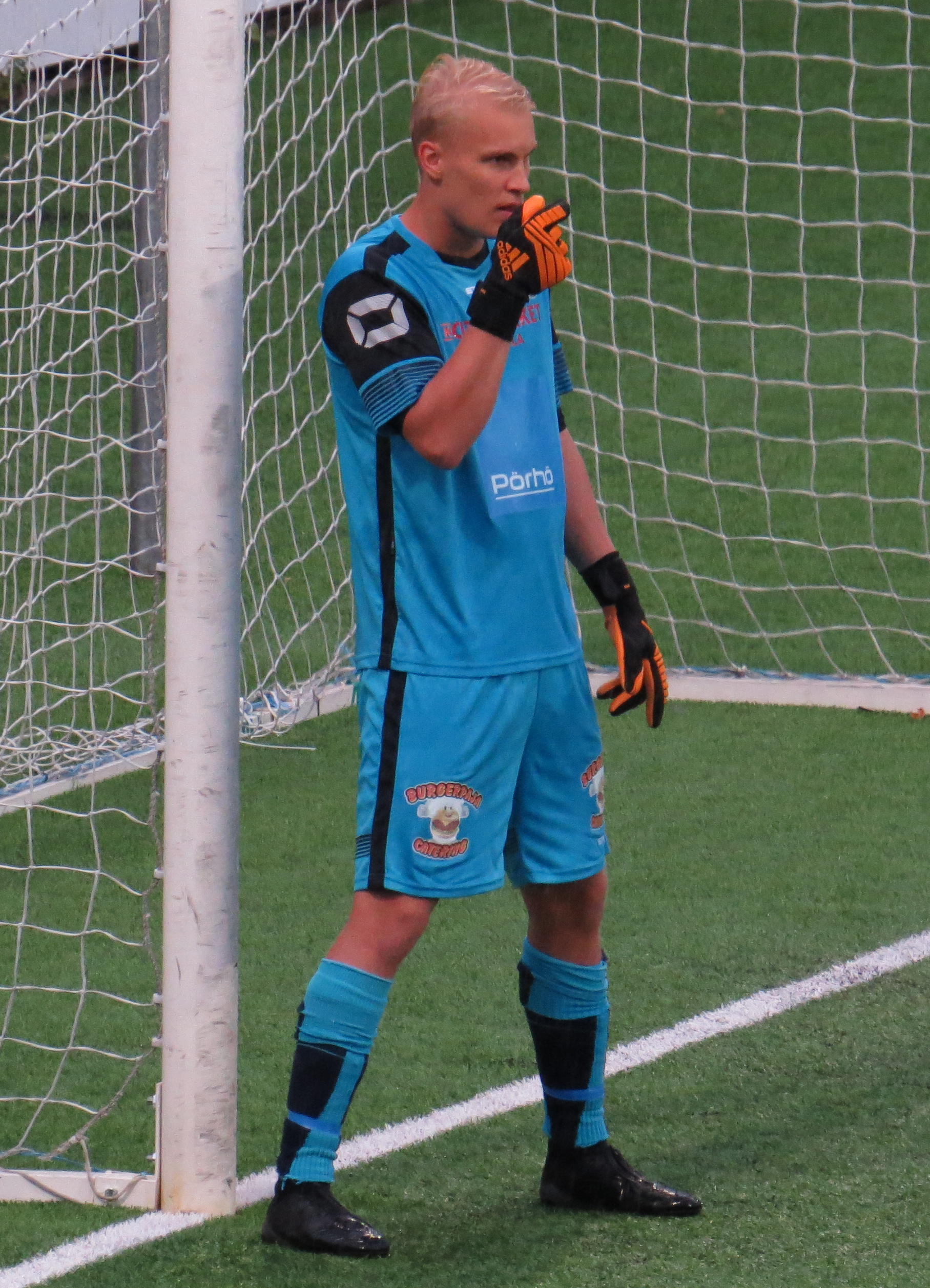
- Marttinen playing for KPV in 2018.

Personal information
- Date of birth: 6 May 1997 (age 29)
- Place of birth: Jyväskylä, Finland
- Height: 1.87 m (6 ft 2 in)
- Position: Goalkeeper

Team information
- Current team: VPS
- Number: 1

Youth career
- Halssilan Nousu
- –2013: JJK

Senior career*
Years	Team	Apps	(Gls)
2013–2017	JJK	48	(0)
2018	SJK	0	(0)
2018	→ KPV (loan)	29	(0)
2019–2020	KPV	23	(0)
2020	→ SJK II (loan)	6	(0)
2021–	VPS	68	(0)

International career
2014	Finland U17	1	(0)
2014	Finland U19	1	(0)
- * Club domestic league appearances and goals as of 28 July 2025

Teppo Marttinen (born 6 May 1997) is a Finnish professional footballer who plays as a goalkeeper for Veikkausliiga club Vaasan Palloseura (VPS).

== Club career ==
Born in Jyväskylä, Marttinen started playing football in a local club Halssilan Nousu before joining JJK Jyväskylä. He made his senior debut with the club's first team in Veikkausliiga in the 2013 season.

In April 2018, Marttinen was loaned out from SJK Seinäjoki to KPV in second-tier Ykkönen. The club won a promotion at the end of the season, and Marttinen signed a permanent contract with KPV.

Since 2021, Marttinen has represented Vaasan Palloseura (VPS), helping the club to win the Ykkönen title in 2021 and earning a promotion to top-tier Veikkausliiga.

== International career ==
Marttinen has represented Finland at under-17 and under-19 youth international levels.

== Career statistics ==
As of 17 February 2025

Appearances and goals by club, season and competition
Club	Season	League			Cup		League cup		Europe		Total	
Club	Season	Division	Apps	Goals	Apps	Goals	Apps	Goals	Apps	Goals	Apps	Goals
JJK	2013	Veikkausliiga	2	0	0	0	0	0	–		2	0
JJK	2014	Ykkönen	7	0	2	0	–		–		9	0
JJK	2015	Ykkönen	7	0	0	0	–		–		7	0
JJK	2016	Ykkönen	6	0	–		–		–		6	0
JJK	2017	Veikkausliiga	26	0	3	0	–		–		29	0
JJK	Total		48	0	5	0	0	0	0	0	53	0
Villiketut	2016	Kolmonen	3	0	–		–		–		3	0
Villiketut	2017	Kakkonen	1	0	–		–		–		1	0
Villiketut	Total		4	0	0	0	0	0	0	0	4	0
SJK	2018	Veikkausliiga	0	0	0	0	–		–		0	0
KPV (loan)	2018	Ykkönen	29	0	0	0	–		–		29	0
KPV	2019	Veikkausliiga	23	0	5	0	–		–		28	0
KPV	2020	Ykkönen	0	0	2	0	–		–		2	0
KPV	Total		23	0	7	0	0	0	0	0	30	0
KPV Akatemia	2020	Kolmonen	7	0	–		–		–		7	0
SJK Akatemia (loan)	2020	Ykkönen	6	0	–		–		–		6	0
VPS Akatemia	2021	Kolmonen	3	0	–		–		–		3	0
VPS	2021	Ykkönen	10	0	1	0	–		–		11	0
VPS	2022	Veikkausliiga	9	0	4	0	2	0	–		15	0
VPS	2023	Veikkausliiga	27	0	0	0	3	0	–		30	0
VPS	2024	Veikkausliiga	18	0	2	0	2	0	1 (Note: Appearances in UEFA Conference League)	0	23	0
VPS	2025	Veikkausliiga	0	0	0	0	2	0	–		2	0
VPS	Total		64	0	7	0	9	0	1	0	81	0
Career total			184	0	19	0	9	0	1	0	213	0

== Honours ==
JJK

- Ykkönen: 2016

KPV

- Ykkönen runner-up: 2018

VPS

- Ykkönen: 2021
