= 2025 FF Jaro season =

FF Jaro
2025 season
- Manager: Niklas Vidjeskog
- Veikkausliiga: Pre-season
- Finnish Cup: Pre-season
- Finnish League Cup: Group stage
- Highest home attendance: 3,616
- Average home league attendance: 2,282

The 2025 season is the 60th overall and their first in the Veikkausliiga after promotion for FF Jaro. The club will take part in the Finnish Cup and Finnish League Cup.

== Squad ==
=== Transfers In ===
Pos.	Player	Transferred to	Fee	Date	Source
DF	(Ghana) Robin Polley	Unattached	Free	9 January 2025	

=== Transfers Out ===
Pos.	Player	Transferred to	Fee	Date	Source
DF	(Trinidad and Tobago) Kareem Moses	(Finland) Jakobstads BK	End of contract	1 January 2025	

== Competitions ==
=== Overall record ===
Competition	Starting round	Record							
Competition	Starting round	Pld	W	D	L	GF	GA	GD	Win %
Veikkausliiga	Matchday 1	0	0	0	0	0	0	+0	—
Finnish Cup		0	0	0	0	0	0	+0	—
Finnish League Cup		0	0	0	0	0	0	+0	—
Total		0	0	0	0	0	0	+0	—

Source: Competitions

=== Finnish League Cup ===
==== Results by round ====
Round	1
Ground	
Result	
Position	

Updated to match(es) played on August 2024. Source:
A = Away; H = Home; W = Win; D = Draw; L = Loss

1	Jaro	v
