= Miika Niemi =

Finnish footballer (born 1994)

Personal information
- Date of birth: 4 March 1994 (age 32)
- Place of birth: Vaasa, Finland
- Height: 1.76 m (5 ft 9 in)
- Position: Full back

Team information
- Current team: VPS
- Number: 23

Youth career
- VPS

Senior career*
Years	Team	Apps	(Gls)
2011–2015	VPS	17	(0)
2015	→ Kiisto (loan)	8	(0)
2016	VIFK	22	(0)
2017	AC Kajaani	20	(0)
2018–2019	VIFK	44	(1)
2020–	VPS	147	(3)
- * Club domestic league appearances and goals as of 13 November 2026

Miika Niemi (born 4 March 1994) is a Finnish professional footballer who plays as a defender for Veikkausliiga club VPS.

== Career ==
Niemi is a product of the youth program of Vaasan Palloseura, and made his Veikkausliiga debut in the 2012 season. He left the club in 2015 to join another local club Kiisto on loan. He represented Kiisto, VIFK and AC Kajaani, before returning to his former club VPS for the 2020 season in the second tier Ykkönen. Next year they won the Ykkönen title and were promoted back to top-tier Veikkausliiga. On 24 October 2023, Niemi extended his contract with VPS until the end of 2025.

== Career statistics ==
As of 13 November 2026

Appearances and goals by club, season and competition
Club	Season	League			Cup (Note: Includes Suomen Cup)		League cup (Note: Includes Finnish League Cup and UEFA Regions' Cup)		Europe		Total	
Club	Season	Division	Apps	Goals	Apps	Goals	Apps	Goals	Apps	Goals	Apps	Goals
VPS	2011	Veikkausliiga	0	0	0	0	0	0	–		0	0
VPS	2012	Veikkausliiga	2	0	0	0	0	0	–		2	0
VPS	2013	Veikkausliiga	2	0	0	0	2	0	–		4	0
VPS	2014	Veikkausliiga	9	0	1	0	4	0	0	0	14	0
VPS	2015	Veikkausliiga	6	0	1	0	5	0	1 (Note: Appearance(s) in UEFA Europa League)	0	13	0
VPS	Total		19	0	2	0	11	0	1	0	33	0
Kiisto (loan)	2015	Kakkonen	8	0	–		–		–		8	0
VIFK	2016	Kakkonen	22	0	0	0	–		–		22	0
AC Kajaani	2017	Kakkonen	20	0	0	0	–		–		20	0
VIFK	2018	Kakkonen	22	0	0	0	–		–		22	0
VIFK	2019	Kakkonen	22	1	–		–		–		22	1
VIFK	Total		44	1	0	0	0	0	0	0	44	1
Kiisto	2019	Kolmonen	0	0	1	0	1	0	–		2	0
VPS	2020	Ykkönen	2	0	5	0	–		–		7	0
VPS	2021	Ykkönen	27	1	2	0	–		–		29	1
VPS	2022	Veikkausliiga	28	1	3	0	3	0	–		34	1
VPS	2023	Veikkausliiga	18	0	1	0	2	0	–		21	0
VPS	2024	Veikkausliiga	24	1	2	0	5	0	2 (Note: Appearances in UEFA Conference League)	0	33	1
VPS	2025	Veikkausliiga	21	0	2	0	5	0	–		28	0
VPS	2026	Veikkausliiga	27	0	5	0	4	0	–		36	0
VPS	Total		147	3	20	0	19	0	2	0	188	3
VPS Akatemia	2022	Kolmonen	1	0	–		–		–		1	0
VPS Akatemia	2023	Kolmonen	1	0	–		–		–		1	0
VPS Akatemia	Total		2	0	0	0	0	0	0	0	2	0
Career total			262	4	23	0	31	0	3	0	319	4

== Honours ==
VPS

- Ykkönen: 2021
