= Oulunkylä Football Stadium =

Stadium in Helsinki, Finland

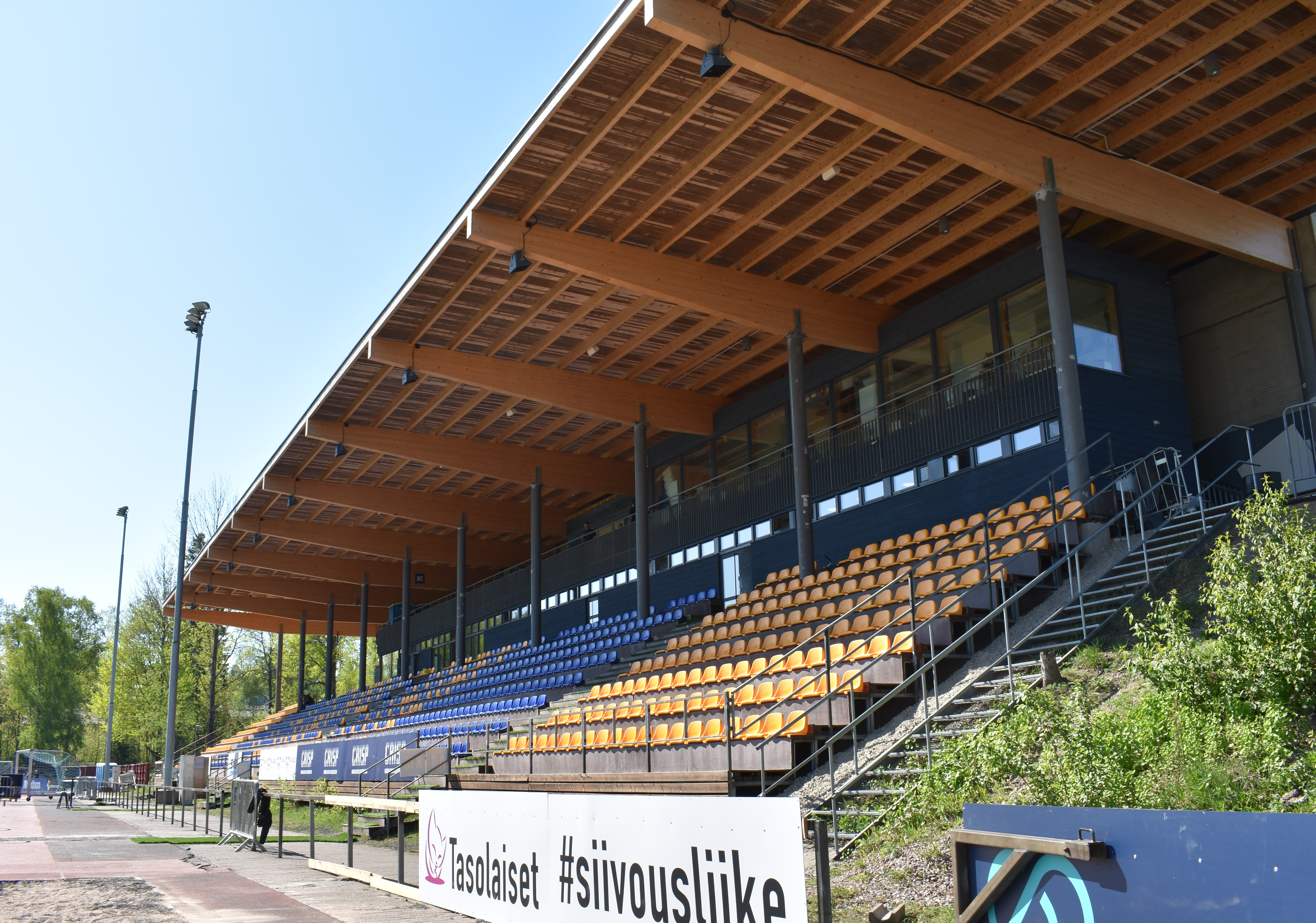
- Main grandstand before the fire in 2024
- Interactive map of Oulunkylä Football Stadium
- Location: Käskynhaltijantie 11, 00640, Helsinki
- Coordinates: 60.234757°N 24.962530°E
- Owner: IF Gnistan/ City of Helsinki
- Capacity: 2,700
- Surface: Artificial grass

Construction
- Opened: 1934
- Renovated: 2006, 2010, 2024

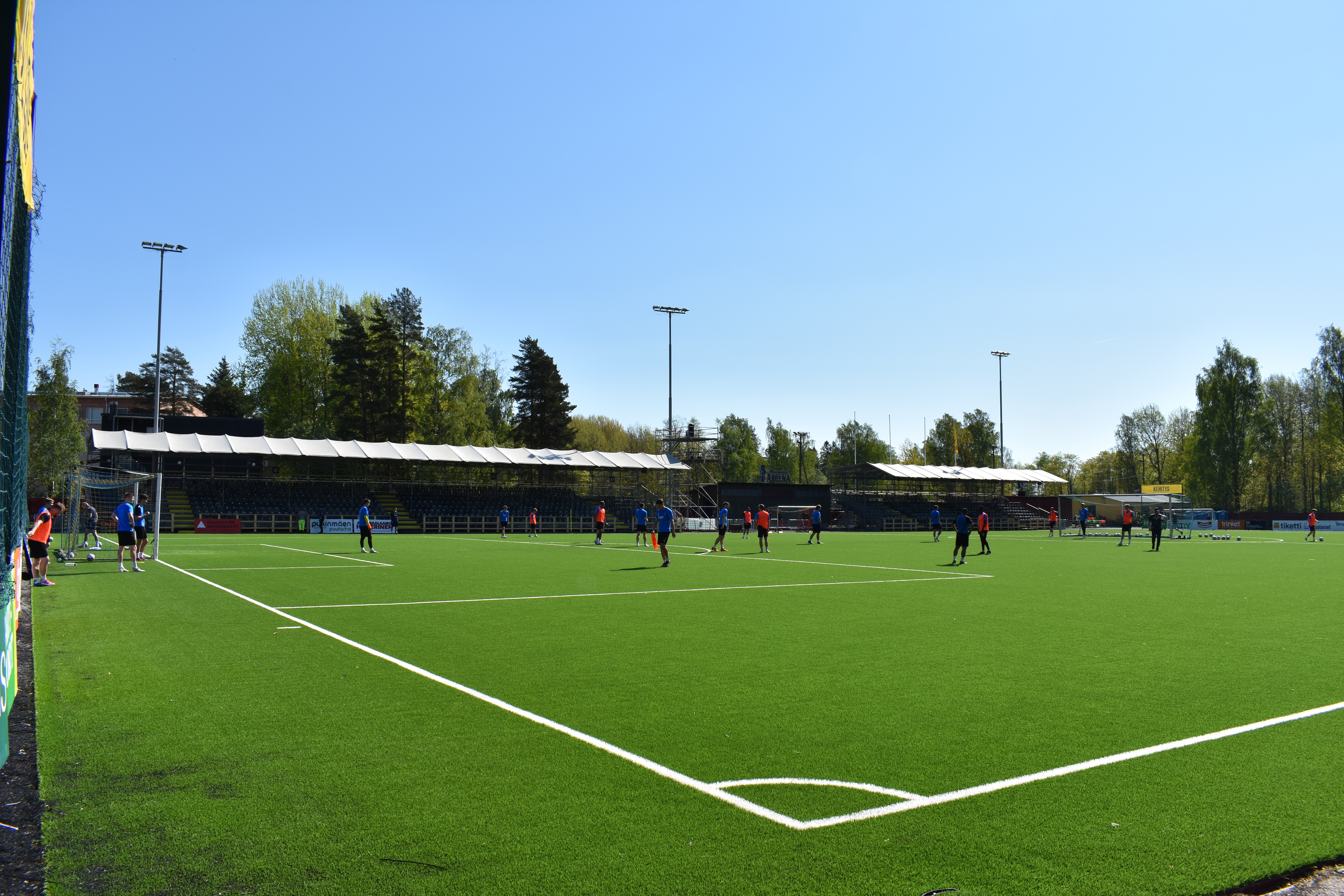
East grandstand and football pitch.

Oulunkylä Football Stadium (Finnish: Oulunkylän jalkapallostadion), known as Markku.fi Areena for sponsorship reasons, is a football stadium in Oulunkylä sports park area in the Oulunkylä neighbourhood of Helsinki, Finland and is the home stadium of football club IF Gnistan.

The stadium holds a seating capacity for 2,700 people.

== History ==
The original Oulunkylä track and field stadium, which had a natural grass surface, opened in 1934 on the site of Finland's first harness racing track. This track had moved to Käpylä in 1927.

In 2006, an artificial turf surface with a heating system was installed, and the stadium was renamed Fair Pay Areena after the project sponsor, Intrum Justitia Oy. This enabled the stadium to be used throughout the year. In 2010, a covered main stand with new facilities, including changing rooms, saunas, a cafeteria and conference rooms, was built. The City of Helsinki was the original owner, but in 2017 Gnistan acquired control and management of the stadium. At the same time, the stadium was renamed Mustapekka Arena in collaboration with the local supermarket and club sponsor, K-Mustapekka.

During the 2017 Ykkönen season, Gnistan was forced to play their first two home games at the Töölö Football Stadium due to the replacement of the artificial turf. The artificial turf was replaced again in 2023.

On 22 February 2024, it was confirmed that Gnistan would play their upcoming Veikkausliiga matches at the Oulunkylä Football Stadium, starting from the 2024 season. According to league requirements, an irrigation system was installed and the pitch lighting was upgraded. The seating capacity was increased from 1,100 to 2,200.

On 13 July 2024, the main stand at the stadium was destroyed by fire. This forced Gnistan to play the rest of their home matches at the Töölö Football Stadium. The following day, it was reported that the club was planning to build a new 6,000–8,000-seater stadium next to the destroyed one.

In April 2025, construction of a new temporary main stand was completed. The main stand's capacity was increased to 1,400 seats, which increased the stadium's total capacity by 500 to around 2,700 seats. On 27 April, Gnistan played their first home match at the Oulunkylä Football Stadium since July 2024, losing 2–1 to visitors KuPS in front of 2,253 spectators.

== Attendance records ==
On 25 October 2023, Gnistan set a new attendance record of 1,622 at the stadium while playing in the Ykkönen league against IFK Mariehamn in a Veikkausliiga promotion play-off match.

On 6 April 2024, in Gnistan's first-ever Veikkausliiga match against Inter Turku, the Oulunkylä Football Stadium set an attendance record with 2,352 spectators. Two months later, on 12 June, a new attendance record of 3,024 was set for a league match against HJK Helsinki. Then, on 28 July 2025, a new attendance record of 3,113 was set at the stadium in a Veikkausliiga match against HJK.

== Names ==
The stadium's current sponsorship name is Markku.fi Areena, named after a property maintenance company. Previous sponsorship names were Mustapekka Areena (2017–2026) and Fair Pay Areena (2006–2017). The stadium is also called Oulunkylä Football Stadium (Finnish: Oulunkylä jalkapallostadion) due to the changing sponsorship names. Before the sponsorship names, the name of the arena was Oulunkylä sports park field (Finnish: Oulunkylän liikuntapuiston kenttä) or Oulunkylä football field (Finnish: Oulunkylän jalkapallokenttä).
