= 2025 Veikkausliiga =

Veikkausliiga
- Season: 2025
- Dates: 5 April – 26 October 2025
- Champions: KuPS
- Relegated: KTP; Haka
- Champions League: KuPS
- Conference League: HJK; Ilves; Inter Turku
- Matches: 162
- Goals: 583 (3.6 per match)
- Top goalscorer: Kasper Paananen (18)
- Biggest home win: HJK 8–2 IFK Mariehamn (24 August 2025)
- Biggest away win: KTP 0–5 Ilves (19 April 2025)
- Highest scoring: HJK 8–2 IFK Mariehamn (24 August 2025)
- Highest attendance: 8,133; HJK 0–0 KuPS (31 May 2025)
- All statistics correct as of 26 October 2025.

The 2025 Veikkausliiga was the 95th season of top-tier football in Finland, which takes place from April to November. Veikkaus was the league's sponsor.

== Teams ==
The league consisted of twelve teams; ten teams remaining from the previous season, and two teams promoted from the Ykkösliiga. KuPS entered the season as defending champions.

=== Team changes ===
Promoted from 2024 Ykkösliiga	Relegated to 2025 Ykkösliiga
KTP; FF Jaro	EIF; Lahti

The promoted teams were the 2024 Ykkösliiga champions KTP (returning to the top flight after a single-season absence), and 2024 Veikkausliiga play-off winners Jaro (returning to the top flight after a nine-year absence). They replaced the 2024 Veikkausliiga bottom-placed team EIF (relegated after a single season), and Veikkausliiga play-off losers Lahti (relegated after a 13-year stint in the top flight).

=== Stadiums and locations ===
Location of teams in 2025 Veikkausliiga

Club	Location	Stadium	Turf	Capacity
IF Gnistan	Oulunkylä, Helsinki	Mustapekka Areena	Artificial	2,700
FC Haka	Valkeakoski	Tehtaan kenttä	Artificial	3,516
HJK	Töölö, Helsinki	Bolt Arena	Artificial	10,770
Ilves	Tampere	Tammelan Stadion	Artificial	8,000
FC Inter Turku	Turku	Veritas Stadion	Artificial	9,372
FF Jaro	Jakobstad (Pietarsaari)	Jakobstads Centralplan	Natural	5,000
KTP	Kotka	Arto Tolsa Areena	Artificial	4,780
KuPS	Kuopio	Väre Areena	Artificial	4,778
IFK Mariehamn	Mariehamn	Wiklöf Holding Arena	Artificial	1,650
AC Oulu	Oulu	Raatti Stadium	Natural	5,000
SJK	Seinäjoki	OmaSP Stadion	Artificial	6,075
VPS	Vaasa	Hietalahti Stadium	Artificial	6,005

=== Personnel and kits ===
All teams are obligated to have the Veikkausliiga logo on the right sleeve of their shirt.

Note: Flags indicate national team as has been defined under FIFA eligibility rules. Players and Managers may hold more than one non-FIFA nationality.

Team	Head coach	Captain	Kit manufacturer
IF Gnistan	(Finland) Jussi Leppälahti	(Finland) Jukka Raitala	Puma
FC Haka	(Finland) Kari Martonen	(Finland) Niklas Friberg	Puma
HJK	(Finland) Miika Nuutinen (interim)	(Finland) Daniel O'Shaughnessy	Adidas
Ilves	(Finland) Joonas Rantanen	(Finland) Otso Virtanen	Adidas
FC Inter Turku	(Finland) Vesa Vasara	(Finland) Juuso Hämäläinen	Nike
FF Jaro	(Finland) Niklas Vidjeskog	(Finland) Sergei Eremenko	Puma
KTP	(Finland) Ossi Virta (interim)	(Finland) Joona Toivio	Puma
KuPS	(Finland) Jarkko Wiss	(Finland) Petteri Pennanen	Puma
IFK Mariehaman	(England) Gary Williams	(Sweden) Pontus Lindgren	Puma
AC Oulu	(Finland) Mikko Isokangas	(Finland) Niklas Jokelainen	Craft
SJK	(Scotland) Stevie Grieve	(Finland) Rasmus Karjalainen	Adidas
VPS	(Finland) Jussi Nuorela	(Finland) Jesper Engström	Nike

=== Managerial changes ===
Team	Outgoing manager	Manner of departure	Date of vacancy	Position in the table	Incoming manager	Date of appointment	Ref
KuPS	(Finland) Jani Honkavaara	Signed by Djurgårdens IF	31 December 2024	Pre-season	(Finland) Jarkko Wiss	1 January 2025	
HJK	(Finland) Toni Korkeakunnas	Sacked	4 May 2025	10th	(Finland) Miika Nuutinen (interim)	4 May 2025	
FC Haka	(Northern Ireland) Andy Smith	Sacked	28 July 2025	10th	(Finland) Kari Martonen	28 July 2025	
KTP	(Finland) Jonas Nyholm	Sacked	20 September 2025	12th	(Finland) Ossi Virta (interim)	20 September 2025	

== Regular season ==
=== League table ===
Pos	Team	Pld	W	D	L	GF	GA	GD	Pts	Qualification
1	Inter Turku	22	13	7	2	46	20	+26	46	Qualification for the Championship Round
2	Ilves	22	14	3	5	47	27	+20	45	Qualification for the Championship Round
3	HJK	22	14	2	6	59	29	+30	44	Qualification for the Championship Round
4	KuPS	22	13	5	4	39	23	+16	44	Qualification for the Championship Round
5	SJK	22	12	5	5	45	31	+14	41	Qualification for the Championship Round
6	Gnistan	22	7	7	8	34	39	−5	28	Qualification for the Championship Round
7	VPS	22	6	7	9	32	34	−2	25	Qualification for the Relegation Round
8	Jaro	22	7	4	11	25	36	−11	25	Qualification for the Relegation Round
9	IFK Mariehamn	22	5	6	11	25	48	−23	21	Qualification for the Relegation Round
10	AC Oulu	22	5	3	14	30	48	−18	18	Qualification for the Relegation Round
11	Haka	22	4	4	14	27	43	−16	16	Qualification for the Relegation Round
12	KTP	22	3	5	14	24	55	−31	14	Qualification for the Relegation Round

Source: Flashscore
Rules for classification: 1) Points; 2) Goal difference; 3) Goals scored; 4) Head-to-head points; 5) Head-to-head goal difference; 6) Head-to-head away goals scored; 7) Play-off
(Note: Play-off is only played if need to decide champion, teams for relegation or UEFA competition and will be played on a neutral ground).

=== Results ===
Home \ Away	GNI	HAK	HJK	ILV	INT	JAR	KTP	KPS	MAR	OUL	SJK	VPS
Gnistan	—	2–0	2–4	0–2	2–2	1–2	2–1	1–2	2–0	3–2	2–2	0–0
Haka	3–2	—	1–2	0–4	0–2	0–1	2–3	1–3	0–1	2–1	2–3	2–1
HJK	0–1	3–1	—	5–1	1–4	2–3	4–1	0–0	8–2	3–1	4–2	3–1
Ilves	2–2	3–2	3–2	—	1–0	2–1	2–1	3–0	2–1	0–0	2–3	3–2
Inter Turku	3–0	1–1	1–1	3–1	—	3–1	5–0	1–1	0–0	3–2	4–1	2–1
Jaro	1–1	2–1	0–3	0–1	0–1	—	2–3	1–3	1–1	2–1	0–4	2–2
KTP	0–0	0–0	1–4	0–5	2–2	3–2	—	0–2	2–2	1–3	0–1	2–2
KuPS	6–2	3–2	3–0	0–3	2–1	1–0	3–0	—	4–1	1–0	1–0	0–2
IFK Mariehamn	2–5	1–1	0–4	3–2	2–2	0–2	3–0	1–0	—	0–1	1–2	1–5
AC Oulu	2–3	3–2	0–4	0–4	1–4	0–1	3–2	2–2	0–1	—	2–2	2–1
SJK	3–1	2–2	1–0	1–1	0–1	3–1	3–0	1–1	4–1	3–1	—	2–3
VPS	0–0	1–2	0–2	1–0	0–2	0–0	3–2	1–1	1–1	4–3	1–2	—

Source: Flashscore
Legend: Blue = home team win; Yellow = draw; Red = away team win.

== Championship round ==
=== League table ===
Pos	Team	Pld	W	D	L	GF	GA	GD	Pts	Qualification
1	KuPS (C)	32	20	7	5	62	34	+28	67	Qualification for the Champions League first qualifying round
2	Inter Turku	32	17	10	5	60	33	+27	61	Qualification for the Conference League first qualifying round
3	Ilves	32	18	6	8	68	45	+23	60	Qualification for the Conference League first qualifying round
4	SJK	32	17	8	7	70	51	+19	59	
5	HJK	32	14	7	11	74	52	+22	49	Qualification for the Conference League second qualifying round (Note: HJK qualified for the Conference League second qualifying round as the 2025 Finnish Cup winners.)
6	Gnistan	32	8	9	15	47	65	−18	33	

Source: Flashscore
Rules for classification: 1) Points; 2) Goal difference; 3) Goals scored; 4) Head-to-head points; 5) Head-to-head goal difference; 6) Head-to-head away goals scored; 7) Play-off
(Note: Play-off is only played if need to decide champion, teams for relegation or UEFA competition and will be played on a neutral ground).
(C) Champions

=== Results ===
Home \ Away	GNI	HJK	ILV	INT	KPS	SJK
Gnistan	—	2–2	1–3	0–2	0–4	3–4
HJK	2–3	—	2–2	1–1	0–2	3–4
Ilves	3–2	3–1	—	1–2	1–1	3–3
Inter Turku	2–1	0–0	2–0	—	0–3	2–2
KuPS	1–1	3–1	2–4	3–2	—	3–2
SJK	3–0	3–3	2–1	2–1	0–1	—

Source: Flashscore
Legend: Blue = home team win; Yellow = draw; Red = away team win.

== Relegation round ==
=== League table ===
Pos	Team	Pld	W	D	L	GF	GA	GD	Pts	Qualification or relegation
1	Jaro	27	10	4	13	35	44	−9	34	
2	IFK Mariehamn	27	8	8	11	34	53	−19	32	
3	VPS	27	8	7	12	37	42	−5	31	
4	AC Oulu	27	8	3	16	35	53	−18	27	
5	KTP (R)	27	5	6	16	31	61	−30	21	Qualification for the Veikkausliiga play-off
6	Haka (R)	27	4	5	18	30	50	−20	17	Relegation to the Ykkösliiga

Source: Flashscore
Rules for classification: 1) Points; 2) Goal difference; 3) Goals scored; 4) Head-to-head points; 5) Head-to-head goal difference; 6) Head-to-head away goals scored; 7) Play-off
(Note: Play-off is only played if need to decide champion, teams for relegation or UEFA competition and will be played on a neutral ground).
(R) Relegated

=== Results ===
Home \ Away	HAK	JAR	KTP	MAR	OUL	VPS
Haka	—	—	1–2	—	0–1	—
Jaro	2–1	—	—	2–3	1–2	—
KTP	—	1–2	—	1–1	—	—
IFK Mariehamn	1–1	—	—	—	2–0	2–1
AC Oulu	—	—	0–2	—	—	2–0
VPS	1–0	1–3	2–1	—	—	—

Source: Flashscore
Legend: Blue = home team win; Yellow = draw; Red = away team win.

== Results by round ==
Team ╲ Round	1	2	3	4	5	6	7	8	9	10	11	12	13	14	15	16	17	18	19	20	21	22	23	24	25	26	27	28	29	30	31	32
KuPS	D	W	W	W	W	W	W	L	D	L	L	W	W	D	W	D	L	W	W	W	W	D	L	W	W	W	W	D	W	D	W	W
Inter Turku	D	W	W	W	D	D	W	W	W	D	W	D	D	W	W	D	W	W	W	L	L	W	W	D	L	L	W	W	D	D	L	W
Ilves	W	W	W	L	L	W	L	D	W	W	L	W	W	D	W	W	W	D	L	W	W	W	W	W	D	L	L	D	W	W	D	L
SJK	W	W	W	D	L	L	D	L	D	W	W	W	W	D	L	W	L	W	W	W	W	D	D	L	W	W	W	W	L	D	D	W
HJK	L	L	L	W	D	W	W	W	D	W	W	L	L	W	W	W	W	L	W	W	W	W	D	D	D	L	L	L	D	L	D	L
Gnistan	L	L	W	L	W	W	D	D	L	W	D	D	L	D	W	L	L	D	W	D	W	L	L	L	L	W	L	L	L	D	D	L
Jaro	W	L	L	L	W	L	D	D	L	L	W	L	W	D	L	L	D	W	W	L	L	W	L	W	L	W	W					
IFK Mariehamn	L	W	L	W	L	D	W	L	D	L	W	L	D	D	L	D	L	D	L	W	L	L	D	W	W	D	W					
VPS	W	D	L	L	W	W	D	W	L	W	D	L	L	L	L	D	D	D	L	D	W	L	W	L	W	L	L					
AC Oulu	L	L	L	L	W	L	L	D	D	L	L	W	L	D	W	L	W	L	L	L	L	W	W	W	L	W	L					
KTP	L	D	L	W	L	L	L	D	D	L	L	W	L	D	L	D	W	L	L	L	L	L	L	L	W	D	W					
Haka	W	L	W	D	L	L	L	D	W	D	L	L	W	L	L	D	L	L	L	L	L	L	D	L	L	L	L					

Updated to match(es) played on 9 November 2025. Source: veikkausliiga.com (in Finnish)
W = Win; D = Draw; L = Lose

== Veikkausliiga play-off ==
The eleventh-placed team (KTP) faced the second-placed team of the 2025 Ykkösliiga (TPS) in a two-legged play-off for the final place in the 2026 Veikkausliiga.

=== First leg ===
23 October 2025	TPS	3–0	KTP	Turku
16:30 BST	Muzaci 78'; Helén 85', 87'			Stadium: Veritas Stadion

=== Second leg ===
26 October 2025	KTP	2–3 (2–6 agg.)	TPS	Kotka
12:00 BST	Rangel 49'; Tahmbi 74'		Helén 3'; Muzaci 56' (pen.); Boström 84' (pen.)	Stadium: Arto Tolsa Areena

== Season statistics ==
=== Top goalscorers ===
As of 9 November 2025

Rank	Player	Club	Goals
1	(Finland) Kasper Paananen	SJK Seinäjoki	18
2	(Finland) Alexander Ring	HJK	14
2	(Guinea) Kerfala Cissoko	Jaro	14
2	(Finland) Teemu Pukki	HJK	14
5	(Finland) Roope Riski	Ilves	13
5	(Guinea) Mohamed Toure	KuPS	13
7	(Ivory Coast) Dimitri Legbo	Inter Turku	12
8	(Senegal) Maissa Fall	VPS	11
9	(Finland) Santeri Hostikka	HJK	10
9	(Nigeria) Korede Adedoyin	IFK Mariehamn	10
9	(Finland) Agon Sadiku	KuPS	10

=== Hat-tricks ===
Player	For	Against	Result	Date
(Denmark) Mads Borchers	VPS	AC Oulu	4–3 (H)	5 April 2025
(Finland) Joslyn Luyeye-Lutumba	KuPS	HJK	3–0 (H)	27 June 2025
(Finland) Agon Sadiku	KuPS	Gnistan	6–2 (H)	1 July 2025
(Finland) Alexander Ring	HJK	IFK Mariehamn	8–2 (H)	24 August 2025

=== Clean sheets ===
As of 26 October 2025

Rank	Player	Club	Clean sheets
1	(Austria) Johannes Kreidl	KuPS	10
1	(Finland) Eetu Huuhtanen	Inter Turku	10
3	(Finland) Otso Virtanen	Ilves	7
4	(Netherlands) Thijmen Nijhuis	HJK Helsinki	5
4	(Finland) Roope Paunio	SJK Seinäjoki	5
4	(Belgium) Álex Craninx	Gnistan	5
7	(Portugal) Miguel Santos	Jaro	4
8	(Finland) Matias Riikonen	Mariehamn	3
8	(Finland) Teppo Marttinen	VPS	3
8	(Finland) Rasmus Leislahti	VPS	3

== Awards ==
=== Monthly awards ===
Month	Player of the Month	Manager of the Month	Ref
April	(Finland) Kasper Paananen (SJK Seinäjoki)	(Scotland) Stevie Grieve (SJK Seinäjoki)	
May	(Finland) Alexander Ring (HJK Helsinki)	(Finland) Vesa Vasara (Inter Turku)	
June	(Cameroon) Antoin Essomba (Inter Turku)	(Scotland) Stevie Grieve (SJK Seinäjoki) ^{(2)}	
July	(United States) Benji Michel (HJK Helsinki)	(Finland) Vesa Vasara (Inter Turku) ^{(2)}	
August	(Finland) Kasper Paananen (SJK Seinäjoki) ^{(2)}	(Finland) Jarkko Wiss (KuPS)	
September	(Nigeria) Cody David (IFK Mariehamn)	(Finland) Joonas Rantanen (Ilves)	
October	(Ivory Coast) Dimitri Legbo (Inter Turku)	(Finland) Jarkko Wiss (KuPS) ^{(2)}	

== Attendances ==
The clubs are listed by average home league attendance.

No.	Club	Average attendance	vs '24	Highest
1	HJK	6,223	-2,2%	8,133
2	FC Ilves	5,447	-5,8%	7,651
3	Seinäjoen JK	3,540	14,0%	6,075
4	FC Inter Turku	3,208	27,8%	4,489
5	VPS Vaasa	2,871	-3,1%	4,632
6	FC Haka	2,773	23,8%	3,780
7	KuPS	2,698	-24,2%	4,023
8	FC KTP	2,428	35,4%	3,412
9	IF Gnistan	2,329	9,3%	3,112
10	FF Jaro	2,282	63,6%	3,616
11	AC Oulu	1,849	6,4%	3,649
12	IFK Mariehamn	1,250	-8,0%	2,267

== See also ==
Competitions

- 2025 Ykkösliiga
- 2025 Ykkönen
- 2025 Kakkonen
- 2025 Finnish Cup

Team seasons

- 2025 FC Haka season
- 2025 FC Inter Turku season
- 2025 FF Jaro season
- 2025 Kuopion Palloseura season
- 2025 SJK season
- 2025 Vaasan Palloseura season

Transfers

- List of Finnish football transfers winter 2024–25
