= 2025 Vaasan Palloseura season =

Vaasan Palloseura
2025 season
- Veikkausliiga: Pre-season
- Finnish Cup: Pre-season
- Finnish League Cup: Group stage
- Highest home attendance: 4,632
- Average home league attendance: 2,871

The 2025 season is the 101st overall and 4th consecutive in the Veikkausliiga for VPS. The club will also participate in the Finnish Cup and Finnish League Cup.

== Squad ==
=== Transfers out ===
Pos.	Player	Transferred to	Fee	Date	Source
MF	(Russia) Yevgeni Bashkirov	(Finland) Gnistan	Free	1 January 2025	

== Competitions ==
=== Overall record ===
Competition	Starting round	Record							
Competition	Starting round	Pld	W	D	L	GF	GA	GD	Win %
Veikkausliiga	Matchday 1	0	0	0	0	0	0	+0	—
Finnish Cup		0	0	0	0	0	0	+0	—
Finnish League Cup		0	0	0	0	0	0	+0	—
Total		0	0	0	0	0	0	+0	—

Source: Competitions

=== Finnish League Cup ===
==== Results by round ====
Round	1
Ground	
Result	
Position	

Updated to match(es) played on August 2024. Source:
A = Away; H = Home; W = Win; D = Draw; L = Loss

1	VPS	v
