= Vasa IFK =

Finnish football club

- Full name: Idrottsföreningen Kamraterna Vasa
- Nickname: VIFK
- Founded: 1900
- Ground: Hietalahti Stadium, Vaasa
- Capacity: 6,009
- Chairman: Kim Sund
- Manager: Max Peltonen
- League: National league, women’s team Kakkonen, men’s team
- 2024: Ykkönen, 11th of 12 (relegated)
Home colours	Away colours

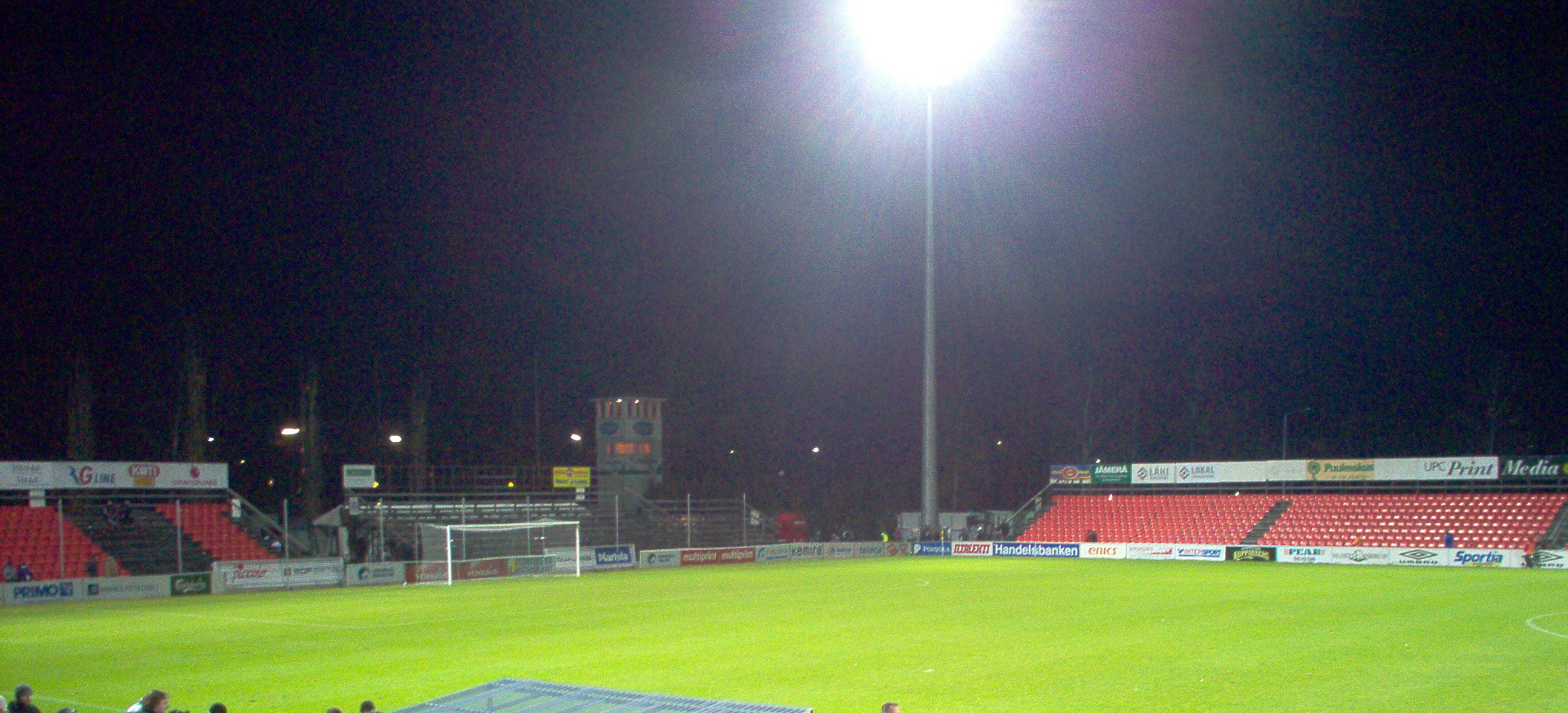
Hietalahden Jalkapallostadion

Vasa IFK (VIFK) is a Finnish football club, located in Vaasa. It was founded in 1900. The club changed its name in 1988 after a merger with another club, BK-48, and was called BK-IFK during the late 1900s. The name was changed back to VIFK in year 2000.

Their men’s representative team moved up to Ykkönen at end of season 2005 which is the second-highest level in Finland. The visit lasted three years and the team was relegated to Kakkonen after finishing 12th place in the 2008 season.

The Vaasa IFK women’s team was promoted to the highest national level, the Briotech National League, in 2025 under the leadership of head coach Tom Kärkkäinen.

The club has a great history, but has yet to achieve the same kind of success as in the mid-20th century. Vasa IFK have won the Finnish championship three times, in 1944, 1946 and 1953. They were runners-up in 1945 and 1951 and finished third in 1950 and 1955. In 1947 and 1948, Vasa IFK also won the league hosted by the FA. In that time there were two separate leagues due to political circumstances. The other league was hosted by the organisation for the labour clubs, TUL.

In 1949 and in 1964 VIFK was the runner-up for the Finnish championship in bandy.

== Current squad ==
Note: Flags indicate national team as defined under FIFA eligibility rules; some limited exceptions apply. Players may hold more than one non-FIFA nationality.

No.	Pos.	Nation	Player
1	GK	USA	Scott Angevine
2	DF	FIN	Merhawi Birhane
3	DF	FIN	Ilari Antila
4	DF	FIN	Jonas Pitkäkangas
6	MF	FIN	Kristian Kokko
7	DF	FIN	Miika Niemi
8	FW	FIN	Casper Källberg
9	FW	FIN	Markus Nordman
10	DF	FIN	Mustafa Maki
11	MF	FIN	Arttu Nuutinen
12	GK	FIN	William Rosenlöf

No.	Pos.	Nation	Player
13	DF	FIN	Ville Huuhka
16	FW	CMR	Junior Oyono
18	MF	FIN	Tony Björk
18	MF	FIN	Christian Österlund
19	FW	FIN	Henry Louko
21	FW	FIN	Hamed Ahmadi
22	GK	FIN	Johannes Ström
23	FW	FIN	Hane Birhane
25	FW	FIN	Nico Renlund
35	GK	FIN	Jussi Virkajärvi
—	FW	JAM	Steven Morrissey

== Achievements ==
- Finnish Premier League:
  - Winners (3): 1944, 1946, 1953
  - Runners-up (2): 1951, 1952

== Season to season ==
Season to season of Vasa IFK

Season	Level	Division	Section	Administration	Position	Movements
1930	Tier 2	B-Sarja (Second Division)	Cup format	Finnish FA (Suomen Pallolitto)	quarter finals	
1931	Tier 2	B-Sarja (Second Division)		Finnish FA (Suomen Pallolitto)	4th	
1932	Tier 2	B-Sarja (Second Division)		Finnish FA (Suomen Pallolitto)	3rd	
1933	Tier 2	B-Sarja (Second Division)		Finnish FA (Suomen Pallolitto)	3rd	
1934	Tier 2	B-Sarja (Second Division)	Western Group	Finnish FA (Suomen Pallolitto)	2nd	Promotion Group 2nd- Promoted
1935	Tier 1	A-Sarja (Premier League)		Finnish FA (Suomen Pallolitto)	7th	Relegated
1936	Tier 2	Itä-Länsi-Sarja (Second Division)	West League	Finnish FA (Suomen Pallolitto)	1st	Promotion Group 1st - Promoted
1937	Tier 1	Mestaruussarja (Premier League)		Finnish FA (Suomen Pallolitto)	7th	Relegation Playoff - Relegated
1938	Tier 2	Itä-Länsi-Sarja (Second Division)	West League, Northern Group	Finnish FA (Suomen Pallolitto)	2nd	
1939	Tier 2	Itä-Länsi-Sarja (Second Division)	West League, Group 4	Finnish FA (Suomen Pallolitto)	2nd	
1940	Tier 1	Cup-Competition	Cup format	Finnish FA (Suomen Pallolitto)	Quarter-Finals	
1940-41	Tier 2	B-Sarja (Second Division)		Finnish FA (Suomen Pallolitto)	1st	Promoted
1943-44	Tier 1	SPL Mestaruussarja (Premier League)		Finnish FA (Suomen Pallolitto)	1st	Championship rematch - Champions
1945	Tier 1	SPL Mestaruussarja (Premier League)	Group B	Finnish FA (Suomen Pallolitto)	1st	SPL Championship final
1945-46	Tier 1	SPL Mestaruussarja (Premier League)		Finnish FA (Suomen Pallolitto)	1st	Finnish championship Playoff vs TUL Champions - Champions
1946-47	Tier 1	SPL Mestaruussarja (Premier League)		Finnish FA (Suomen Pallolitto)	1st	Championship rematch - SPL Champions, Finnish championship Group 4th
1947-48	Tier 1	SPL Mestaruussarja (Premier League)		Finnish FA (Suomen Pallolitto)	1st	Champions
1948	Tier 1	Mestaruussarja (Premier League)		Finnish FA (Suomen Pallolitto)	5th	
1949	Tier 1	Mestaruussarja (Premier League)		Finnish FA (Suomen Pallolitto)	4th	
1950	Tier 1	Mestaruussarja (Premier League)		Finnish FA (Suomen Pallolitto)	3rd	
1951	Tier 1	Mestaruussarja (Premier League)		Finnish FA (Suomen Pallolitto)	2nd	
1952	Tier 1	Mestaruussarja (Premier League)		Finnish FA (Suomen Pallolitto)	2nd	
1953	Tier 1	Mestaruussarja (Premier League)		Finnish FA (Suomen Pallolitto)	1st	Championship rematch - Champions
1954	Tier 1	Mestaruussarja (Premier League)		Finnish FA (Suomen Pallolitto)	4th	
1955	Tier 1	Mestaruussarja (Premier League)		Finnish FA (Suomen Pallolitto)	3rd	
1956	Tier 1	Mestaruussarja (Premier League)		Finnish FA (Suomen Pallolitto)	9th	Relegated
1957	Tier 2	Suomensarja (Second Division)	West Group	Finnish FA (Suomen Pallolitto)	1st	Promoted
1958	Tier 1	Mestaruussarja (Premier League)		Finnish FA (Suomen Pallolitto)	6th	
1959	Tier 1	Mestaruussarja (Premier League)		Finnish FA (Suomen Pallolitto)	7th	
1960	Tier 1	Mestaruussarja (Premier League)		Finnish FA (Suomen Pallolitto)	8th	
1961	Tier 1	Mestaruussarja (Premier League)		Finnish FA (Suomen Pallolitto)	10th	Relegated
1962	Tier 2	Suomensarja (Second Division)	North Group	Finnish FA (Suomen Pallolitto)	1st	Promoted
1963	Tier 1	Mestaruussarja (Premier League)		Finnish FA (Suomen Pallolitto)	12th	Relegated
1964	Tier 2	Suomensarja (Second Division)	North Group	Finnish FA (Suomen Pallolitto)	3rd	
1965	Tier 2	Suomensarja (Second Division)	North Group	Finnish FA (Suomen Pallolitto)	10th	Relegation Playoff - Relegated
1966	Tier 3	Maakuntasarja (Third Division)	Group 8	Finnish FA (Suomen Pallolitto)	3rd	
1967	Tier 3	Maakuntasarja (Third Division)	Group 9	Finnish FA (Suomen Pallolitto)	2nd	
1968	Tier 3	Maakuntasarja (Third Division)	Group 7	Finnish FA (Suomen Pallolitto)	1st	Promoted
1969	Tier 2	Suomensarja (Second Division)	West Group	Finnish FA (Suomen Pallolitto)	3rd	
1970	Tier 2	II Divisioona (Second Division)	North Group	Finnish FA (Suomen Pallolitto)	8th	
1971	Tier 2	II Divisioona (Second Division)	West Group	Finnish FA (Suomen Pallolitto)	6th	
1972	Tier 2	II Divisioona (Second Division)	North Group	Finnish FA (Suomen Pallolitto)	8th	
1973	Tier 3	II divisioona (Second Division)	North Group	Finnish FA (Suomen Pallolitto)	11th	Relegated
1974	Tier 4	III Divisioona (Third Division)	Group 8	Vaasa District (SPL Vaasa)	6th	
1975	Tier 4	III Divisioona (Third Division)	Group 8	Vaasa District (SPL Vaasa)	2nd	
1976	Tier 4	III Divisioona (Third Division)	Group 8	Vaasa District (SPL Vaasa)	10th	Relegated
1977	Tier 5	IV Divisioona (Fourth Division)	Group 14 - Vaasa	Vaasa District (SPL Vaasa)	1st	Promoted
1978	Tier 4	III Divisioona (Third Division)	Group 8	Vaasa District (SPL Vaasa)	1st	Promoted
1979	Tier 3	II divisioona (Second Division)	North Group	Finnish FA (Suomen Pallolitto)	2nd	Promotion Playoff - Promoted
1980	Tier 2	I Divisioona (First Division)		Finnish FA (Suomen Pallolitto)	9th	Relegation Group 2nd
1981	Tier 2	I Divisioona (First Division)		Finnish FA (Suomen Pallolitto)	10th	Relegation Group 7th – Relegated
1982	Tier 3	II divisioona (Second Division)	North Group	Finnish FA (Suomen Pallolitto)	11th	Relegated
1983	Tier 4	III Divisioona (Third Division)	Group 8	Vaasa District (SPL Vaasa)	2nd	Promotion Playoff
1984	Tier 4	III Divisioona (Third Division)	Group 8	Vaasa District (SPL Vaasa)	3rd	
1985	Tier 4	III Divisioona (Third Division)	Group 8	Vaasa District (SPL Vaasa)	2nd	Rematch for promotion
1986	Tier 4	III Divisioona (Third Division)	Group 8	Vaasa District (SPL Vaasa)	3rd	
1987	Tier 4	III Divisioona (Third Division)	Group 8	Vaasa District (SPL Vaasa)	1st	Promoted
1988	Tier 3	II divisioona (Second Division)	North Group	Finnish FA (Suomen Pallolitto)	10th	Relegated, merger with ABK-48 to stay in II divisioona
1989	Tier 3	II divisioona (Second Division)	North Group	Finnish FA (Suomen Pallolitto)	7th	BK-IFK
1990	Tier 3	II Divisioona (Second Division)	North Group	Finnish FA (Suomen Pallolitto)	9th	BK-IFK
1991	Tier 3	II divisioona (Second Division)	North Group	Finnish FA (Suomen Pallolitto)	4th	BK-IFK
1992	Tier 3	II divisioona (Second Division)	North Group	Finnish FA (Suomen Pallolitto)	2nd	BK-IFK
1993	Tier 3	II divisioona (Second Division)	North Group	Finnish FA (Suomen Pallolitto)	2nd	BK-IFK – Promoted
1994	Tier 2	Ykkönen (First Division)		Finnish FA (Suomen Pallolitto)	11th	BK-IFK – Relegated
1995	Tier 3	Kakkonen (Second Division)	West Group	Finnish FA (Suomen Pallolitto)	3rd	BK-IFK
1996	Tier 3	Kakkonen (Second Division)	North Group	Finnish FA (Suomen Pallolitto)	4th	BK-IFK
1997	Tier 3	Kakkonen (Second Division)	West Group	Finnish FA (Suomen Pallolitto)	4th	BK-IFK
1998	Tier 3	Kakkonen (Second Division)	West Group	Finnish FA (Suomen Pallolitto)	6th	BK-IFK
1999	Tier 3	Kakkonen (Second Division)	North Group	Finnish FA (Suomen Pallolitto)	6th	BK-IFK
2000	Tier 3	Kakkonen (Second Division)	North Group	Finnish FA (Suomen Pallolitto)	10th	BK-IFK – Relegated
2001	Tier 4	Kolmonen (Third Division)	Vaasa	Vaasa District (SPL Vaasa)	2nd	Promoted
2002	Tier 3	Kakkonen (Second Division)	North Group	Finnish FA (Suomen Pallolitto)	8th	
2003	Tier 3	Kakkonen (Second Division)	North Group	Finnish FA (Suomen Pallolitto)	3rd	
2004	Tier 3	Kakkonen (Second Division)	North Group	Finnish FA (Suomen Pallolitto)	6th	
2005	Tier 3	Kakkonen (Second Division)	North Group	Finnish FA (Suomen Pallolitto)	1st	Promoted
2006	Tier 2	Ykkönen (First Division)		Finnish FA (Suomen Pallolitto)	8th	
2007	Tier 2	Ykkönen (First Division)		Finnish FA (Suomen Pallolitto)	6th	
2008	Tier 2	Ykkönen (First Division)		Finnish FA (Suomen Pallolitto)	12th	Relegated
2009	Tier 3	Kakkonen (Second Division)	Group C	Finnish FA (Suomen Pallolitto)	4th	
2010	Tier 3	Kakkonen (Second Division)	Group C	Finnish FA (Suomen Pallolitto)	6th	
2011	Tier 3	Kakkonen (Second Division)	Group C	Finnish FA (Suomen Pallolitto)	5th	
2012	Tier 3	Kakkonen (Second Division)	West Group	Finnish FA (Suomen Pallolitto)	4th	
2013	Tier 3	Kakkonen (Second Division)	North Group	Finnish FA (Suomen Pallolitto)	3rd	
2014	Tier 3	Kakkonen (Second Division)	West Group	Finnish FA (Suomen Pallolitto)	1st	Promoted
2015	Tier 2	Ykkönen (First Division)		Finnish FA (Suomen Pallolitto)	10th	Relegated
2016	Tier 3	Kakkonen (Second Division)	Group C	Finnish FA (Suomen Pallolitto)	9th	
2017	Tier 3	Kakkonen (Second Division)	Group C	Finnish FA (Suomen Pallolitto)	3rd	
2018	Tier 3	Kakkonen (Second Division)	Group C	Finnish FA (Suomen Pallolitto)	10th	Relegated - Retained position in kakkonen
2019	Tier 3	Kakkonen (Second Division)	Group C	Finnish FA (Suomen Pallolitto)	8th	
2020	Tier 3	Kakkonen (Second Division)	Group C	Finnish FA (Suomen Pallolitto)	10th	
2021	Tier 3	Kakkonen (Second Division)	Group C	Finnish FA (Suomen Pallolitto)	9th	
2022	Tier 3	Kakkonen (Second Division)	Group C	Finnish FA (Suomen Pallolitto)	2nd	
2023	Tier 3	Kakkonen (Second Division)	Group C	Finnish FA (Suomen Pallolitto)	5th	Qualifiers for Ykkönen - Qualified
2024	Tier 3	Ykkönen (First Division)		Finnish FA (Suomen Pallolitto)	11th	Relegated
2025	Tier 4	Kakkonen (Second Division)	Group C	Finnish FA (Suomen Pallolitto)		

- 21 seasons in Veikkausliiga
- 24 seasons in Ykkönen
- 37 seasons in Kakkonen
- 11 season in Kolmonen
- 1 seasons in Nelonen
