= IF Gnistan =

Finnish football club

Gnistan
- Nickname: Kipinä (The Spark)
- Founded: 1924; 102 years ago
- Ground: Oulunkylä Football Stadium, Oulunkylä, Helsinki, Finland
- Capacity: 2,700
- Chairman: Risto Murto
- Head Coach: Jussi Leppälahti
- League: Veikkausliiga
- 2026: Veikkausliiga, 5th of 12
Home colours	Away colours	Third colours

IF Gnistan (Kipinä in Finnish; The Spark in English), commonly known as Gnistan, is a Finnish professional football club from the city of Helsinki, founded in 1924. The club is currently playing in the Veikkausliiga, the first tier of the Finnish league system. IF Gnistan play their home matches at Oulunkylä Football Stadium. The club's home district is Oulunkylä, which is located in the northern part of the capital city.

== History ==
The club is originally Swedish-speaking, but nowadays it is supported by Finnish-speaking majority also. The club was founded by a few Svenska Reallyceum and Åggelby Svenska Samskola students from Oulunkylä in 1924. IF Gnistan was a multi-sport club and had several competitive departments including ski, athletics, swim and pesäpallo (Finnish baseball). Football department were founded in 1935, when the club joined Finnish Football Association Helsinki district. Later in the 1950s Gnistan had strong teams in orienteering, women's gymnastics, table tennis and cross country running alongside the classical sports.

During the late 1950s, the club decided to dissolve all the other departments except for the football teams. When ski and athletics were eliminated, Gnistan turned to a football club, and named Jacob Söderman as their new chairman. They became a significant team in lower leagues of the capital region but never promoted to the top tier. After season 1994, they achieved their place to Ykkönen for the first time. They stayed in the second tier four years and then relegated back to Kakkonen in 1998. They have been in Ykkönen level on four occasions.

Gnistan has played seven seasons in the Ykkönen (First Division), the second tier of Finnish football in 1995–98, 2001–02 and from the season 2017. The club has played fourteen seasons in the Kakkonen (Second Division), the third tier of Finnish football in 1990, 1994, 1999–2000 and 2003–2016.

In 2002, the club nearly made it to the semi-finals of the Finnish Cup, by leading FC Lahti 2–0 till the 90th minute. A FC Lahti fan, ran naked to the field, which caused 5 minutes of added time. Lahti scored twice in injury time and in extra time they made the final score 2–3.

After season 2016, the club won their Kakkonen group and achieved a chance to qualify for Ykkönen for the next season. They faced another group winner Musan Salama on two-legged tie, which started away from home in Pori. Both meetings ended 1–0 victories for the home teams, so the promoting team were solved by penalty shoot-out. Gnistan beat their opponents by 4–3 and promoted to the second tier of Finnish football after spending 14 seasons in a row in Kakkonen.

After establishing their place in then second-tier Ykkönen, Gnistan finished 2nd in the 2023 season, and earned a spot to Veikkausliiga promotion play-offs, where they eventually fell short to IFK Mariehamn. However, it was later announced that Gnistan were granted a Veikkausliiga league license via supplemental process, after FC Honka was declared for bankruptcy. 2024 Veikkausliiga season will be the first in the Finnish top-tier level in the club's entire history. After the 2023 season, the CEO Marko Kolsi, who had served for four seasons, left the position and Ilkka Vanala was named the new chief executive officer of Gnistan.

Early in the morning on 13 July 2024, the main stand and the facilities of Gnistan's home stadium Oulunkylä Football Stadium were destroyed in a fire.

== Season to season ==
Season to Season

Season	Level	Division	Section	Administration	Position	Movements
1948	Tier 4	Piirinsarja (District League)		Helsinki (SPL Helsinki)		Promotion Playoff - Promoted
1949	Tier 3	Maakuntasarja (Third Division)	South Group B	Finnish FA (Suomen Pallolitto)	5th	
1950	Tier 3	Maakuntasarja (Third Division)	South Group A	Finnish FA (Suomen Pallolitto)	2nd	
1951	Tier 3	Maakuntasarja (Third Division)	South Group A	Finnish FA (Suomen Pallolitto)	4th	
1952	Tier 3	Maakuntasarja (Third Division)	South Group A	Finnish FA (Suomen Pallolitto)	6th	
1953	Tier 3	Maakuntasarja (Third Division)	South Group A	Finnish FA (Suomen Pallolitto)	5th	
1954	Tier 3	Maakuntasarja (Third Division)	West Group IV	Finnish FA (Suomen Pallolitto)	3rd	
1955	Tier 3	Maakuntasarja (Third Division)	South Group II	Finnish FA (Suomen Pallolitto)	2nd	
1956	Tier 3	Maakuntasarja (Third Division)	South Group I	Finnish FA (Suomen Pallolitto)	3rd	
1957	Tier 3	Maakuntasarja (Third Division)	South Group I	Finnish FA (Suomen Pallolitto)	6th	
1958	Tier 3	Maakuntasarja (Third Division)	Group 1	Finnish FA (Suomen Pallolitto)	3rd	
1959	Tier 3	Maakuntasarja (Third Division)	Group 1	Finnish FA (Suomen Pallolitto)	3rd	
1960	Tier 3	Maakuntasarja (Third Division)	Group 1	Finnish FA (Suomen Pallolitto)	4th	
1961	Tier 3	Maakuntasarja (Third Division)	Group 1	Finnish FA (Suomen Pallolitto)	5th	
1962	Tier 3	Maakuntasarja (Third Division)	Group 1	Finnish FA (Suomen Pallolitto)	6th	
1963	Tier 3	Maakuntasarja (Third Division)	Group 1	Finnish FA (Suomen Pallolitto)	3rd	
1964	Tier 3	Maakuntasarja (Third Division)	Group 1	Finnish FA (Suomen Pallolitto)	5th	
1965	Tier 3	Maakuntasarja (Third Division)	Group 1	Finnish FA (Suomen Pallolitto)	2nd	
1966	Tier 3	Maakuntasarja (Third Division)	Group 1	Finnish FA (Suomen Pallolitto)	7th	
1967	Tier 3	Maakuntasarja (Third Division)	Group 1	Finnish FA (Suomen Pallolitto)	3rd	
1968	Tier 3	Maakuntasarja (Third Division)	Group 1	Finnish FA (Suomen Pallolitto)	5th	
1969	Tier 3	Maakuntasarja (Third Division)	Group 1	Finnish FA (Suomen Pallolitto)	8th	
1970	Tier 3	III Divisioona (Third Division)	Group 1	Finnish FA (Suomen Pallolitto)	6th	
1971	Tier 3	III Divisioona (Third Division)	Group 1	Finnish FA (Suomen Pallolitto)	10th	
1972	Tier 3	III Divisioona (Third Division)	Group 5	Finnish FA (Suomen Pallolitto)	5th	
1973	Tier 4	III Divisioona (Third Division)	Group 1	Helsinki (SPL Helsinki)	9th	Relegation Playoff - Relegated
1974	Tier 5	IV Divisioona (Fourth Division)	Group 3	Helsinki District (SPL Helsinki)	2nd	
1975	Tier 5	IV Divisioona (Fourth Division)	Group 2	Helsinki District (SPL Helsinki)	4th	
1976	Tier 5	IV Divisioona (Fourth Division)	Group 3	Helsinki District (SPL Helsinki)	3rd	
1977	Tier 5	IV Divisioona (Fourth Division)	Group 2	Helsinki District (SPL Helsinki)	1st	Promoted
1978	Tier 4	III Divisioona (Third Division)	Group 2	Helsinki (SPL Helsinki)	7th	
1979	Tier 4	III Divisioona (Third Division)	Group 1	Helsinki (SPL Helsinki)	10th	
1980	Tier 4	III Divisioona (Third Division)	Group 2	Helsinki (SPL Helsinki)	12th	Relegated
1981	Tier 5	IV Divisioona (Fourth Division)	Group 2	Helsinki District (SPL Helsinki)	6th	
1982	Tier 5	IV Divisioona (Fourth Division)	Group 1	Helsinki District (SPL Helsinki)	6th	
1983	Tier 5	IV Divisioona (Fourth Division)	Group 3	Helsinki District (SPL Helsinki)	11th	Relegated
1984	Tier 6	V Divisioona (Fifth Division)	Group 2	Helsinki District (SPL Helsinki)		
1985	Tier 6	V Divisioona (Fifth Division)		Helsinki District (SPL Helsinki)		Promoted
1986	Tier 5	IV Divisioona (Fourth Division)	Group 2	Helsinki District (SPL Helsinki)	3rd	
1987	Tier 5	IV Divisioona (Fourth Division)		Helsinki District (SPL Helsinki)		Promoted
1988	Tier 4	III Divisioona (Third Division)	Group 1	Helsinki (SPL Helsinki)	3rd	
1989	Tier 4	III Divisioona (Third Division)	Group 2	Helsinki (SPL Helsinki)	1st	Promoted
1990	Tier 3	II Divisioona (Second Division)	East Group	Finnish FA (Suomen Pallolitto)	10th	Relegated
1991	Tier 4	III Divisioona (Third Division)	Group 1	Helsinki (SPL Helsinki)	5th	
1992	Tier 4	III Divisioona (Third Division)	Group 2	Helsinki (SPL Helsinki)	2nd	
1993	Tier 4	Kolmonen (Third Division)	Group 1	Helsinki (SPL Helsinki)	1st	Promoted
1994	Tier 3	Kakkonen (Second Division)	South Group	Finnish FA (Suomen Pallolitto)	2nd	Promoted
1995	Tier 2	Ykkönen (First Division)		Finnish FA (Suomen Pallolitto)	9th	
1996	Tier 2	Ykkönen (First Division)	South Group	Finnish FA (Suomen Pallolitto)	6th	
1997	Tier 2	Ykkönen (First Division)	South Group	Finnish FA (Suomen Pallolitto)	7th	Relegation Group (South) – 3rd – Relegation Play-offs
1998	Tier 2	Ykkönen (First Division)	South Group	Finnish FA (Suomen Pallolitto)	9th	Relegation Group (South) – 4th – Relegated
1999	Tier 3	Kakkonen (Second Division)	West Group	Finnish FA (Suomen Pallolitto)	7th	
2000	Tier 3	Kakkonen (Second Division)	South Group	Finnish FA (Suomen Pallolitto)	1st	Promoted
2001	Tier 2	Ykkönen (First Division)	South Group	Finnish FA (Suomen Pallolitto)	8th	Relegation Play-offs
2002	Tier 2	Ykkönen (First Division)	South Group	Finnish FA (Suomen Pallolitto)	9th	Relegation Group (South) – 7th – Relegated
2003	Tier 3	Kakkonen (Second Division)	South Group	Finnish FA (Suomen Pallolitto)	7th	
2004	Tier 3	Kakkonen (Second Division)	South Group	Finnish FA (Suomen Pallolitto)	5th	
2005	Tier 3	Kakkonen (Second Division)	South Group	Finnish FA (Suomen Pallolitto)	2nd	
2006	Tier 3	Kakkonen (Second Division)	Group A	Finnish FA (Suomen Pallolitto)	4th	
2007	Tier 3	Kakkonen (Second Division)	Group A	Finnish FA (Suomen Pallolitto)	7th	
2008	Tier 3	Kakkonen (Second Division)	Group A	Finnish FA (Suomen Pallolitto)	4th	
2009	Tier 3	Kakkonen (Second Division)	Group A	Finnish FA (Suomen Pallolitto)	2nd	
2010	Tier 3	Kakkonen (Second Division)	Group A	Finnish FA (Suomen Pallolitto)	3rd	
2011	Tier 3	Kakkonen (Second Division)	Group A	Finnish FA (Suomen Pallolitto)	2nd	
2012	Tier 3	Kakkonen (Second Division)	East Group	Finnish FA (Suomen Pallolitto)	2nd	
2013	Tier 3	Kakkonen (Second Division)	South Group	Finnish FA (Suomen Pallolitto)	2nd	
2014	Tier 3	Kakkonen (Second Division)	South Group	Finnish FA (Suomen Pallolitto)	8th	
2015	Tier 3	Kakkonen (Second Division)	South Group	Finnish FA (Suomen Pallolitto)	2nd	
2016	Tier 3	Kakkonen (Second Division)	Group A	Finnish FA (Suomen Pallolitto)	1st	Promoted via Play-offs
2017	Tier 2	Ykkönen (First Division)		Finnish FA (Suomen Pallolitto)	10th	Relegated
2018	Tier 3	Kakkonen (Second Division)	Group A	Finnish FA (Suomen Pallolitto)	6th	
2019	Tier 3	Kakkonen (Second Division)	Group B	Finnish FA (Suomen Pallolitto)	1st	Promoted
2020	Tier 2	Ykkönen (First Division)		Finnish FA (Suomen Pallolitto)	9th	
2021	Tier 2	Ykkönen (First Division)		Finnish FA (Suomen Pallolitto)	6th	
2022	Tier 2	Ykkönen (First Division)		Finnish FA (Suomen Pallolitto)	7th	
2023	Tier 2	Ykkönen (First Division)		Finnish FA (Suomen Pallolitto)	2nd	Promotion play-offs – Promoted via supplemental process
2024	Tier 1	Veikkausliiga (Premier League)		Finnish FA (Suomen Pallolitto)	8th	
2025	Tier 1	Veikkausliiga (Premier League)		Finnish FA (Suomen Pallolitto)	6th	

- 1 season in Veikkausliiga
- 11 seasons in Ykkönen
- 44 seasons in Kakkonen
- 10 seasons in Kolmonen
- 9 seasons in Nelonen
- 2 seasons in Vitonen

== Club structure ==
Gnistan run a number of teams including 4 men's teams, 3 veteran's teams, 2 ladies teams, 11 boys team and 6 girls teams. The club also runs a Football School for youngsters.

== 2025 season ==
IF Gnistan are competing in Veikkausliiga, highest level of the Finnish football league system.

Gnistan/Ogeli are participating in Group B of the Kolmonen (Third Division) administered by the Helsinki SPL. This is the current fifth tier in Finland.

Gnistan/3 are participating in the Southern Group of the Vitonen (Fifth Division) administered by the Helsinki SPL. This is the current seventh tier in Finland

Gnistan's women's top representative team competes in the third-tier Naisten Kakkonen.

Gnistan's women's reserve team Gnistan/2 is competing in Naisten Nelonen, which is the fifth-tier in Finnish women's football.

== Current squad ==
As of 7 September 2026

Note: Flags indicate national team as defined under FIFA eligibility rules; some limited exceptions apply. Players may hold more than one non-FIFA nationality.

No.	Pos.	Nation	Player
1	GK	FIN	Otso Virtanen (on loan from Ilves)
2	DF	FIN	Benjamin Dahlström
3	DF	ESP	Ruxi
4	DF	BRA	Marcelo Costa
7	FW	FIN	Artur Atarah
10	FW	FIN	Joakim Latonen
11	FW	VEN	Danny Pérez
12	DF	GHA	Edmund Arko-Mensah
13	GK	FIN	Oskar Lyberopoulos
14	MF	FIN	Sergei Eremenko
15	MF	FIN	Gabriel Europaeus
19	DF	ESP	Bogdan Milovanov (on loan from Sirius)
20	DF	NOR	Max Bjurström (on loan from Helsingborgs)

No.	Pos.	Nation	Player
23	FW	FIN	Saku Ylätupa
24	DF	BFA	Rachide Gnanou
25	DF	FIN	Noah Rossi
26	MF	FIN	Roman Eremenko
27	MF	FIN	Otto Hannula
31	MF	FIN	Adam Jouhi
33	DF	FIN	Samuel Heikari
40	DF	FIN	Juhani Ojala
44	MF	RUS	Yevgeni Bashkirov
45	FW	FIN	Kosmo Launiala
50	MF	FIN	Jeff Selenge
67	DF	ENG	Ayo Obileye
95	GK	SVK	Matej Jurička (on loan from Železiarne Podbrezová)

=== Out on loan ===
Note: Flags indicate national team as defined under FIFA eligibility rules; some limited exceptions apply. Players may hold more than one non-FIFA nationality.

No.	Pos.	Nation	Player

== Management and boardroom ==
=== Management ===
As of 15 February 2024

Name	Role
(Finland) Jussi Leppälahti	Head Coach
(Finland) Mikke Salonen	Assistant Coach
(Finland) Marko Frantsi	Goalkeeping Coach
(Finland) Patrick Cousins	Team Manager
(Finland) Ari Ahonen	Kit Manager
(Finland) Joni Välilä	Physiotherapist

=== Boardroom ===
As of 28 August 2024

Name	Role
(Finland) Risto Murto	Chairman
(Finland) Patrik Ekström	Vice Chairman
(Finland) Ilkka Vanala	CEO
(Finland) Toni Korkeakunnas	Sporting Director
(Finland) Juhani Ojala	Head of Recruitment and Scouting
(Finland) Jarkko Jokiranta	Technical Director

== Sources ==
- Suomen Cup
