= Petteri Pennanen =

Finnish footballer (born 1990)

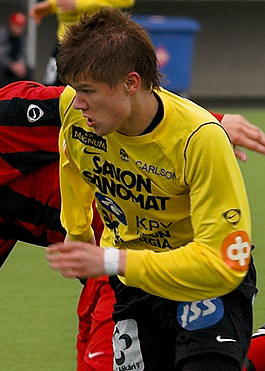
- Pennanen playing for KuPS in 2007

Personal information
- Full name: Petteri Henri Juhana Pennanen
- Date of birth: 19 September 1990 (age 36)
- Place of birth: Kuopio, Finland
- Height: 1.81 m (5 ft 11 in)
- Position: Central midfielder

Team information
- Current team: KuPS
- Number: 8

Youth career
- −2006: KuPS

Senior career*
Years	Team	Apps	(Gls)
2007–2008	KuPS	30	(0)
2009–2010	Twente	0	(0)
2011–2014	TPS	91	(12)
2014	RoPS	7	(2)
2015–2016	KuPS	41	(8)
2016–2017	Miedź Legnica	14	(0)
2017–2019	KuPS	77	(19)
2020	Persikabo 1973	3	(0)
2020	KuPS	18	(3)
2021	Sacramento Republic	22	(0)
2022–2023	Ilves	38	(13)
2023	Hyderabad	11	(1)
2024–	KuPS	85	(19)

International career
2009	Finland U19	5	(0)
2010–2012	Finland U21	10	(0)
2013	Finland	1	(0)
- * Club domestic league appearances and goals as of 12 November 2026

Petteri Henri Juhana Pennanen (born 19 September 1990) is a Finnish professional footballer who plays as a central midfielder for Veikkausliiga club KuPS.

== Club career ==
A product of local Kuopion Palloseura (KuPS), Pennanen made his senior début on 29 April 2007, aged 16, against VIFK. A month later, he was a starter against PK-35. That season he appeared in 13 first-team matches. In February 2009 Pennanen signed a two-year contract with the Dutch team Twente along with teammate Tuomas Rannankari.

After not making a single appearance for the Twente's first-team, Pennanen left the Dutch champions during winter 2011 and signed with TPS. He signed with RoPS before the 2014 season.

On 14 January 2020, Pennanen left KuPS and signed a contract with Indonesian Liga 1 club Persikabo 1973.

In 2021, Pennanen joined USL Championship side Sacramento Republic. Pennanen was released by Sacramento following the 2021 season.

On 14 December 2021, he signed a three-year contract with Ilves.

On 23 July 2023, Indian Super League club Hyderabad announced the signing of Pennanen on a one-year deal. In February 2024, Pennanen terminated his contract with Hyderabad due to unpaid salaries.

On 28 February 2024, Pennanen returned to Finland and Kuopio after signing a one-year deal with his hometown club KuPS, with an option to extend for one more, reuniting with his former coach Jani Honkavaara. On 24 July, his deal was extended for the 2025. On 21 September, Pennanen helped his team to win the 2024 Finnish Cup title by scoring a brace in the final in a 2–1 win against Inter Turku. On 19 October, Pennanen scored the winning goal in the last match of the season against HJK Helsinki, helping his side secure the Veikkausliiga championship title and completing the club's first-ever double.

== International career ==
Pennanen represented Finland at under-19 and under-21 youth national team levels. He made his full senior national team debut on 26 January 2013, in a friendly match against Sweden.

== Career statistics ==
=== Club ===
As of match played 26 February 2026

Appearances and goals by club, season and competition
Club	Season	League			National cup		League cup		Continental		Total	
Club	Season	Division	Apps	Goals	Apps	Goals	Apps	Goals	Apps	Goals	Apps	Goals
KuPS	2007	Ykkönen	10	0	0	0	—		—		10	0
KuPS	2008	Veikkausliiga	17	0	0	0	0	0	—		17	0
KuPS	Total		27	0	0	0	0	0	0	0	27	0
TPS	2011	Veikkausliiga	32	1	0	0	0	0	2 (Note: Appearances in UEFA Europa League)	0	34	1
TPS	2012	Veikkausliiga	27	6	1	0	8	2	—		36	8
TPS	2013	Veikkausliiga	32	5	1	0	7	4	2	0	42	9
TPS	Total		91	12	2	0	15	4	6	0	114	16
RoPS	2014	Veikkausliiga	7	2	1	0	4	0	—		12	2
KuPS	2015	Veikkausliiga	9	1	4	4	1	1	—		14	6
KuPS	2016	Veikkausliiga	32	7	4	0	3	0	—		44	0
KuPS	Total		41	8	8	4	4	1	0	0	50	13
Miedź Legnica	2016–17	I liga	14	0	—		—		—		14	0
KuPS	2017	Veikkausliiga	17	1	—		—		—		17	1
KuPS	2018	Veikkausliiga	33	12	5	5	—		2	0	40	17
KuPS	2019	Veikkausliiga	27	6	5	0	—		4	0	36	0
KuPS	Total		77	19	10	5	0	0	6	0	93	24
Persikabo 1973	2020	Indonesian Liga 1	3	0	—		—		—		3	0
KuPS	2020	Veikkausliiga	18	3	—		—		4 (Note: One appearance in UEFA Champions League, three appearances in UEFA Europa League)	0	22	3
Sacramento Republic	2021	USL Championship	22	0	—		—		—		22	0
Ilves	2022	Veikkausliiga	26	9	0	0	3	1	—		29	10
Ilves	2023	Veikkausliiga	12	4	5	3	5	1	—		22	8
Ilves	Total		38	13	5	3	8	2	0	0	51	18
Hyderabad	2023–24	Indian Super League	11	1	—		—		—		11	1
KuPS	2024	Veikkausliiga	26	7	3	3	2	0	4 (Note: Appearances in UEFA Conference League)	0	35	10
KuPS	2025	Veikkausliiga	31	7	5	0	3	0	14 (Note: Four appearances in UEFA Champions League, four appearances and one goal in UEFA Europa League, six appearances in UEFA Conference League)	1	53	8
KuPS	2026	Veikkausliiga	0	0	0	0	2	1	2	0	4	1
KuPS	Total		57	14	8	3	7	1	20	1	92	19
Career total			401	69	34	15	14	3	28	1	480	90

=== International ===
Appearances and goals by national team and year
National team	Year	Apps	Goals
Finland	2013	1	0
Total		1	0

== Honours ==
KuPS

- Veikkausliiga: 2019, 2024, 2025
- Finnish Cup: 2024
- Finnish League Cup runner-up: 2024

TPS

- Finnish League Cup: 2012

Individual

- Veikkausliiga Player of the Year: 2024
- Veikkausliiga Midfielder of the Year: 2018, 2019, 2022, 2024
- Veikkausliiga Team of the Year: 2018, 2019, 2024
- Veikkausliiga Player of the Month: April 2018, October 2018, April 2023, October 2024
