= Jani Honkavaara =

Finnish footballer and manager (born 1976)

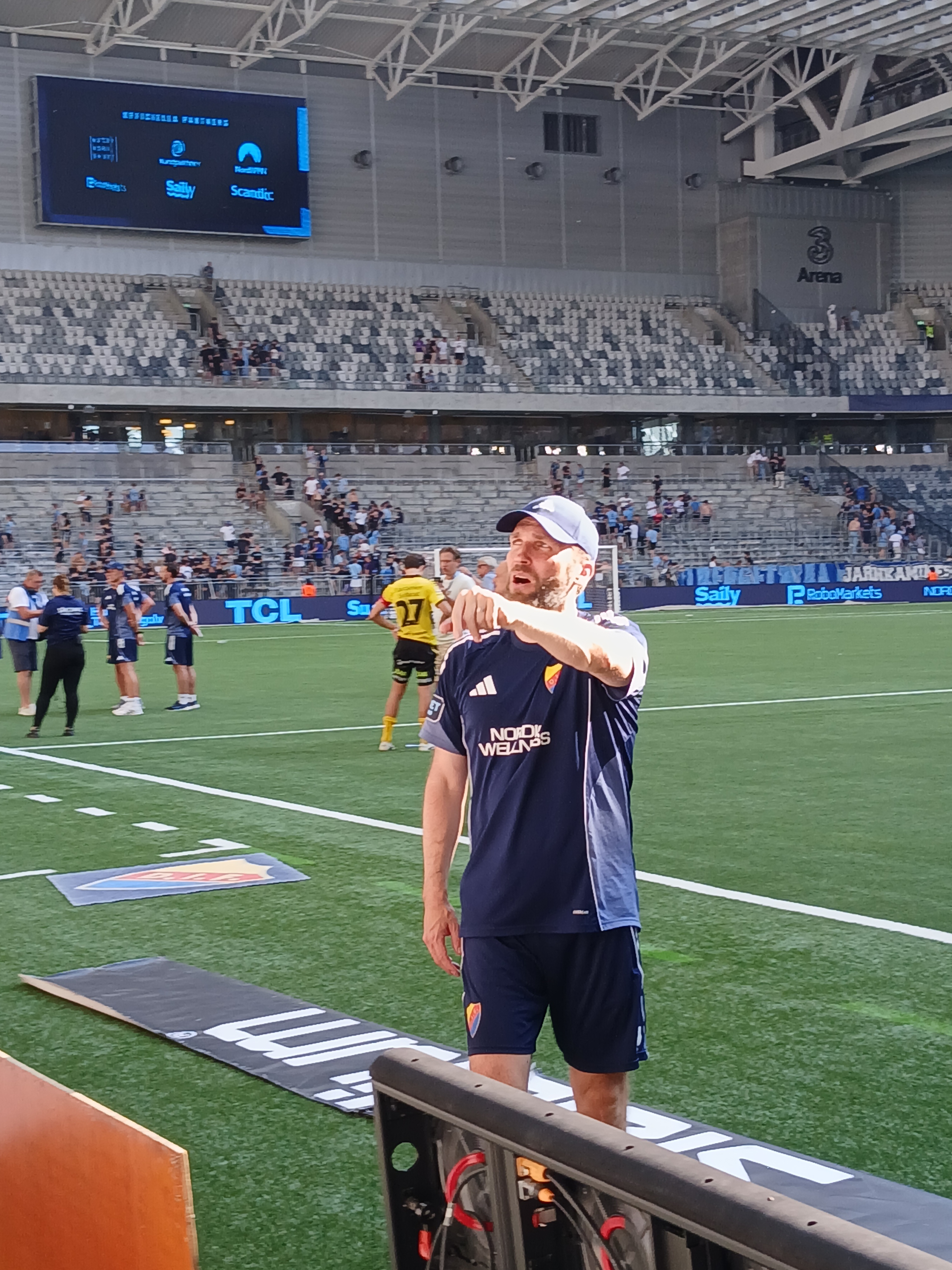
- Jani Honkavaara as head coach of Djurgården in 2025

Personal information
- Date of birth: 2 February 1976 (age 50)
- Place of birth: Seinäjoki, Finland
- Height: 1.80 m (5 ft 11 in)
- Positions: Forward; midfielder

Senior career*
Years	Team	Apps	(Gls)
1993–1999	TP-Seinäjoki (Note: Törnävän Pallo-55 before the name change in 1994)	121	(10)
2000	Joensuun Pallo	18	(1)
2001	TP-Seinäjoki	14	(0)
2002	Jippo	12	(4)
2002–2004	Viikingit	45	(7)
2005	Someron Voima	16	(1)
2006	Kontu	2	(1)
2006	Viikingit	10	(0)
Total		221	(118)

Managerial career
- 2007–2009: Viikingit (assistant)
- 2010–2011: HIFK
- 2012: Gnistan
- 2013–2016: HIFK
- 2017–2019: KuPS
- 2020–2021: SJK
- 2023–2024: KuPS
- 2024: Finland (assistant)
- 2025–2026: Djurgården
- * Club domestic league appearances and goals

Jani Honkavaara (born 2 February 1976), is a Finnish professional football manager and former player, who most recently managed Swedish Allsvenskan club Djurgården. Nicknamed "Super-Honsu", he led Veikkausliiga club KuPS to two Finnish championship titles in two separate stints as manager, in 2019 and 2024.

== Playing career ==
Honkavaara began his football career in his hometown club TP-Seinäjoki (formerly known as Törnävän Pallo-55). During his time with the club, he played 10 matches in the Finnish top tier Veikkausliiga in the 1997 season. While studying in Joensuu, Honkavaara played for local clubs Joensuun Pallo and Jippo in the third-tier Kakkonen, in 2000 and 2002 respectively. Later in his career, he was mainly known for playing for East Helsinki based club FC Viikingit of Vuosaari in the second-tier Ykkönen.

== Managerial career ==
=== Viikingit ===
After retiring as a football player, Honkavaara started as an assistant coach of FC Viikingit, in the coaching staff of Toni Korkeakunnas. In 2007, he was appointed the head coach for the 2007 Veikkausliiga season and held the position of coach in the club until 2009.

=== HIFK and Gnistan ===
In the autumn of 2009, he was selected as head coach of HIFK where he led the club towards promotion to the Finnish first division Ykkönen after season 2010. He resigned from the role of manager of HIFK after season 2011. After the successful spell at HIFK, he went to coach another Helsinki based club IF Gnistan. Despite a rather successful season, he then resigned from the club after season 2012, citing family reasons. Soon after he was appointed as the new head coach of HIFK which had faced relegation back to Finnish second division, Kakkonen, after the ending season, led by Honkavaara's successor in the managerial role, Juha Moilanen. Right after next and very successful season 2013, he led HIFK back to Ykkönen. After the 2014 season, HIFK was promoted to Veikkausliiga, making it to the top tier of Finnish football for the first time in over 40 years.

=== KuPS ===
At the end of November 2016 it was announced, that Honkavaara would be the new manager of Kuopion Palloseura (KuPS), starting from 1 January 2017. He managed the club to finish 2nd in the league in 2017, and in the 3rd place in 2018. In June 2019, he was offered a head coach position of Royale Union Saint-Gilloise. The Belgian club offered to pay a €100,000 fee for his contract, but KuPS was reluctant to let Honkavaara leave. Eventually, in the 2019 Veikkausliiga season, Honkavaara led KuPS to its first Finnish championship title in 43 years.

=== SJK Seinäjoki ===
In October 2019 Honkavaara was announced as the new manager of his hometown side Seinäjoen Jalkapallokerho (SJK). In the 2021 season, the team finished 3rd in Veikkausliiga and won the bronze medal.

In the early 2022, Honkavaara started to work as a coach educator for the Football Association of Finland.

=== Return to KuPS ===
In April 2023, Honkavaara returned to KuPS, when the club sacked Pasi Tuutti after only three games in the season. Honkavaara improved the team's performances and led KuPS to finish 2nd in the 2023 Veikkausliiga season, by a goal difference to HJK. In the end of the season, the club first didn't exercise their option, but later announced that Honkavaara's contract was extended for the 2024 season. For the 2024 season, KuPS reduced the player budget and acquired more of young potential players, rather than players who had already proved their league-level.

On 17 June 2024, Honkavaara was also named the new assistant coach of the Finland national football team. It was also announced that he would not continue as the manager of KuPS after the 2024 season. In September, Honkavaara guided KuPS to win the Finnish Cup, and in October they won the Veikkausliiga championship title again, making it the first double win in the club's history, and the second title for Honkavaara with KuPS. He was awarded Finnish Football Manager of the Year and Veikkausliiga Manager of the Year in 2024.

=== Djurgårdens IF ===
On 20 December 2024, Swedish Allsvenskan side Djurgården announced that they had appointed Honkavaara as their new manager on a three-year contract, starting in January 2025. His tenure with the Finland national team ended simultaneously. After Djurgården was knocked out of the Svenska Cupen in group stage, in March Honkavaara led the club to qualify for the quarter finals of the UEFA Conference League by defeating Pafos 3–1 on aggregate, making it the first European quarter final appearance for a Swedish club since AIK in 1996–97. Later they advanced to the semi-finals against Chelsea, after beating Rapid Wien in the quarter-finals. Honkavaara was named the Allsvenskan Manager of the Month for September 2025, after leading Djurgården to an eleven-game unbeaten run.

== Personal life ==
Honkavaara has studied Finnish language and literature at the University of Eastern Finland in Joensuu, and has later worked as a teacher.

In 2005, he worked briefly as a host of a TV-program Näytetään kieltä, produced by Yle.

Honkavaara is married and a father, and has lived in Tuusula with his family.

== Managerial statistics ==
As of 8 November 2026

Team	Nat	From	To	Record				
Team	Nat	From	To	P	W	D	L	W%
HIFK	(Finland)	1 January 2010	31 December 2011	50	23	11	16	46.00
Gnistan	(Finland)	1 January 2012	31 December 2012	27	15	7	5	55.56
HIFK	(Finland)	1 January 2013	27 July 2016	113	46	27	40	40.71
KuPS	(Finland)	1 January 2017	31 December 2019	116	58	28	30	50.00
SJK Seinäjoki	(Finland)	1 January 2020	31 December 2021	59	25	12	22	42.37
KuPS	(Finland)	21 April 2023	20 December 2024	72	45	11	16	62.50
Djurgården	(Sweden)	20 December 2024	10 November 2026	73	36	15	22	49.32
Total				510	248	111	151	48.63

== Managerial honours ==
KuPS

- Veikkausliiga: 2019, 2024
- Veikkausliiga runner-up: 2017, 2023
- Veikkausliiga 3rd place: 2018
- Finnish Cup: 2024
- Finnish League Cup runner-up: 2024

SJK

- Veikkausliiga 3rd place: 2021

HIFK

- Ykkönen: 2014
- Kakkonen Group 2: 2013
- Kakkonen Group A: 2010

Individual

- Finnish Football Manager of the Year: 2024
- Veikkausliiga Manager of the Year 2024
- Allsvenskan Manager of the Month: September 2025
- Veikkausliiga Manager of the Month (6): May 2017, August 2019, October 2019 May 2024, July 2024, October 2024
