= 2024 Veikkausliiga =

Veikkausliiga
- Season: 2024
- Dates: 6 April – 19 October 2024
- Champions: KuPS
- Relegated: EIF; Lahti
- Champions League: KuPS
- Europa League: Ilves
- Conference League: HJK; SJK
- Matches: 167
- Goals: 492 (2.95 per match)
- Top goalscorer: Ashley Coffey; Jaime Moreno (12 goals)
- Biggest home win: Ilves 5–0 FC Haka; 17 May 2024
- Biggest away win: Ekenäs IF 0–7 Inter Turku; 14 July 2024
- Highest scoring: Ilves 4–6 IF Gnistan; 13 April 2024; SJK 5–5 FC Lahti; 27 July 2024
- Highest attendance: 8,835; HJK 0–1 Ilves (28 September 2024)
- All statistics correct as of 19 October 2024.

The 2024 Veikkausliiga was the 94th season of top-tier football in Finland, which takes place from April to November. Veikkaus was the league's sponsor.

== Teams ==
The league consisted of twelve teams; ten teams remaining from the previous season, and two teams promoted from the Ykkönen. HJK entered the season as defending champions (for the fourth consecutive season).

=== Team changes ===
Promoted from 2023 Ykkönen	Relegated to 2024 Ykkösliiga	Relegated to 2025 Ykkösliiga
EIF; Gnistan	KTP	EIF; Lahti

EIF were promoted as champions of the 2023 Ykkönen (returning to the top flight after a 90-year absence), replacing the bottom-placed 2023 Veikkausliiga team (KTP, relegated after a single-year stint in top flight). Ykkönen runners-up Gnistan were also promoted (marking their debut in the top flight) after fifth-placed Veikkausliiga team Honka were demoted due to bankruptcy, replacing them in the league.

At the end of the season, EIF were relegated back to Ykkösliiga after finishing 12th. The 11th placed team FC Lahti were defeated in the relegation play-offs by FF Jaro and were also relegated.

=== Stadiums and locations ===
Location of teams in 2024 Veikkausliiga

Club	Location	Stadium	Turf	Capacity
AC Oulu	Oulu	Raatti Stadium	Natural	5,000
Ekenäs IF	Ekenäs, Raseborg	Ekenäs Centrumplan	Artificial	1,900
FC Haka	Valkeakoski	Tehtaan kenttä	Artificial	3,516
FC Inter Turku	Turku	Veritas Stadion	Artificial	9,372
FC Lahti	Lahti	Lahti Stadium	Natural	7,465
HJK	Töölö, Helsinki	Bolt Arena	Artificial	10,770
IF Gnistan	Oulunkylä, Helsinki	Mustapekka Areena	Artificial	2,200
IFK Mariehamn	Mariehamn	Wiklöf Holding Arena	Artificial	1,650
Ilves	Tampere	Tammelan Stadion	Artificial	8,000
KuPS	Kuopio	Väre Areena	Artificial	4,778
SJK	Seinäjoki	OmaSP Stadion	Artificial	5,817
VPS	Vaasa	Hietalahti Stadium	Artificial	6,005

=== Personnel and kits ===
All teams are obligated to have the Veikkausliiga logo on the right sleeve of their shirt.

Note: Flags indicate national team as has been defined under FIFA eligibility rules. Players and Managers may hold more than one non-FIFA nationality.

Team	Head coach	Captain	Kit manufacturer
AC Oulu	(Finland) Mikko Isokangas and (Brazil) / (Finland) Rafinha	(Finland) Niklas Jokelainen	Craft
Ekenäs IF	(Finland) Christian Sund	(Ghana) Enoch Kofi Adu	Craft
FC Haka	(Northern Ireland) Andy Smith	(Portugal) Guilherme Morais	Puma
FC Inter Turku	(Finland) Vesa Vasara	(Finland) Juuso Hämäläinen	Nike
FC Lahti	(Portugal) Ricardo Duarte	(Finland) Mikko Viitikko	Adidas
HJK	(Finland) Toni Korkeakunnas	(Finland) Joona Toivio	Adidas
IF Gnistan	(Finland) Jussi Leppälahti	(Finland) Jukka Raitala	Puma
IFK Mariehaman	(England) Gary Williams	(Finland) Robin Sid	Puma
Ilves	(Finland) Joonas Rantanen	(Finland) Otso Virtanen	Adidas
KuPS	(Finland) Jani Honkavaara	(Finland) Petteri Pennanen	Puma
SJK	(Scotland) Stevie Grieve	(Finland) Ville Tikkanen	Adidas
VPS	(Finland) Jussi Nuorela	(Finland) Jesper Engström	Nike

=== Managerial changes ===
Team	Outgoing manager	Manner of departure	Date of vacancy	Position in the table	Incoming manager	Date of appointment
AC Oulu	(Finland) Rauno Ojanen / (Finland) Jussi-Pekka Savolainen	Contract expired	30 November 2023	Pre-season	(Finland) Tuomas Silvennoinen	8 November 2023
AC Oulu	(Finland) Tuomas Silvennoinen	Dismissed	13 June 2024	10th	(Greece) Kostas Bratsos	20 June 2024
AC Oulu	(Greece) Kostas Bratsos	Dismissed	2 September 2024	9th	(Finland) Mikko Isokangas (Brazil) / (Finland) Rafinha (caretakers)	2 September 2024
Ekenäs IF	(Spain) Gabriel Garcia Xatart	Dismissed	10 August 2024	12th	(Finland) Christian Sund	12 August 2024
FC Haka	(Finland) Teemu Tainio	Signed by AEL Limassol		Pre-season	(Northern Ireland) Andy Smith	31 October 2023
FC Inter Turku	(Finland) Jarkko Wiss	Contract terminated	6 November 2023	Pre-season	(Finland) Vesa Vasara	17 November 2023
FC Lahti	(Finland) Toni Lindberg	Dismissed	20 June 2024	11th	(Portugal) Ricardo Duarte	21 June 2024
HJK	(Finland) Toni Korkeakunnas	Contract expired		Pre-season	(Finland) Ossi Virta / (Spain) Ferran Sibila	14 November 2023
HJK	(Finland) Ossi Virta / (Spain) Ferran Sibila	Dismissed	20 May 2024	5th	(Finland) Toni Korkeakunnas	20 May 2024
IF Gnistan	(Finland) Joonas Rantanen	Signed by Ilves	23 October 2023	Pre-season	(Finland) Jussi Leppälahti	10 November 2023
IFK Mariehamn	(Finland) Jimmy Wargh	Appointed the club director		Pre-season	(Portugal) Bruno Romão	20 December 2023
IFK Mariehamn	(Portugal) Bruno Romão	Resigned	14 August 2024	11th	(England) Gary Williams	16 August 2024
Ilves	(Finland) Joni Lehtonen	Appointed the assistant coach		Pre-season	(Finland) Joonas Rantanen	23 October 2023
SJK	(Spain) Joaquín Gomez	Signed by Al Qadsiah FC	4 November 2023	Pre-season	(Scotland) Stevie Grieve/ (Finland) Toni Lehtinen	12 January 2024

== Regular season ==
=== League table ===
Pos	Team	Pld	W	D	L	GF	GA	GD	Pts	Qualification
1	KuPS	22	13	5	4	39	22	+17	44	Qualification for the Championship Round
2	HJK	22	13	4	5	41	21	+20	43	Qualification for the Championship Round
3	Ilves	22	11	6	5	45	25	+20	39	Qualification for the Championship Round
4	SJK	22	10	6	6	40	33	+7	36	Qualification for the Championship Round
5	Haka	22	10	5	7	35	32	+3	35	Qualification for the Championship Round
6	VPS	22	9	5	8	34	36	−2	32	Qualification for the Championship Round
7	Inter Turku	22	9	4	9	38	29	+9	31	Qualification for the Relegation Round
8	Gnistan	22	8	6	8	32	34	−2	30	Qualification for the Relegation Round
9	Oulu	22	5	6	11	26	36	−10	21	Qualification for the Relegation Round
10	Mariehamn	22	5	5	12	20	38	−18	20	Qualification for the Relegation Round
11	Lahti	22	3	10	9	26	38	−12	19	Qualification for the Relegation Round
12	EIF	22	3	4	15	19	51	−32	13	Qualification for the Relegation Round

Source: Flashscore
Rules for classification: 1) Points; 2) Goal difference; 3) Goals scored; 4) Head-to-head points; 5) Head-to-head goal difference; 6) Head-to-head away goals scored; 7) Play-off
(Note: Play-off is only played if need to decide champion, teams for relegation or UEFA competition and will be played on a neutral ground).

=== Results ===
Home \ Away	EIF	GNI	HAK	HJK	ILV	INT	KPS	LAH	MAR	OUL	SJK	VPS
EIF	—	1–0	1–2	0–3	0–2	0–7	1–2	1–1	1–2	1–1	1–1	1–2
Gnistan	1–2	—	0–3	0–4	1–1	2–1	0–0	2–1	2–1	2–0	0–1	3–0
Haka	2–1	1–2	—	1–1	4–3	0–0	2–2	1–1	2–0	4–3	2–0	1–2
HJK	0–0	1–0	2–0	—	1–1	1–0	3–1	4–0	2–1	3–0	4–1	1–2
Ilves	5–0	4–6	5–0	3–0	—	3–0	1–2	0–0	2–0	3–2	2–2	3–2
Inter Turku	2–1	2–2	3–1	0–1	0–2	—	1–1	3–0	3–0	3–3	3–0	3–1
KuPS	4–1	3–1	0–1	3–1	1–0	1–2	—	1–0	3–0	4–1	2–1	2–1
Lahti	4–0	3–3	1–1	2–1	2–2	0–2	0–1	—	3–0	1–2	0–4	0–0
Mariehamn	3–2	1–1	0–3	1–2	0–1	3–1	2–2	0–0	—	2–1	0–4	0–0
Oulu	2–0	1–1	0–1	1–0	0–1	1–0	1–0	2–2	1–1	—	1–2	1–2
SJK	3–1	0–1	2–1	3–3	1–0	3–1	1–1	5–5	0–2	2–1	—	3–1
VPS	2–3	3–2	3–2	1–3	1–1	3–1	1–3	3–0	2–1	1–1	1–1	—

Source: Flashscore
Legend: Blue = home team win; Yellow = draw; Red = away team win.

== Championship Round ==
=== League table ===
Pos	Team	Pld	W	D	L	GF	GA	GD	Pts	Qualification
1	KuPS (C)	27	17	5	5	46	24	+22	56	Qualification for the Champions League first qualifying round
2	Ilves	27	16	6	5	56	27	+29	54	Qualification for the Europa League first qualifying round (Note: The 2024 Finnish Cup winners qualified for the Conference League second qualifying round. Since the cup winners (KuPS) qualified based on league position, the Conference League second round spot was passed to the second-placed team. However due to the 2024-25 UEFA Conference League titleholders qualifying directly for the Champions League via their own domestic league, the spot reserved in the Europa League for the Conference League titleholders was vacated, and after rebalancing, the spot in the Conference League second qualifying round was transferred to the Europa League first qualifying round.)
3	HJK	27	13	6	8	44	27	+17	45	Qualification for the Conference League first qualifying round (Note: Since the Conference League second qualifying round spot was passed to the second-placed team, the Conference League first round spot was passed to the third-placed team, the Conference League play-off final spot was passed to the fourth-placed team, and the fourth Conference League play-off quarter-final spot was passed to the eighth-placed team.)
4	SJK (O)	27	11	7	9	46	44	+2	40	Qualification for the Conference League first qualifying round play-off final
5	VPS	27	11	6	10	43	45	−2	39	Qualification for the Conference League first qualifying round play-off quarter-finals
6	Haka	27	11	5	11	40	43	−3	38	Qualification for the Conference League first qualifying round play-off quarter-finals

Source: Flashscore
Rules for classification: 1) Points; 2) Goal difference; 3) Goals scored; 4) Head-to-head points; 5) Head-to-head goal difference; 6) Head-to-head away goals scored; 7) Play-off
(Note: Play-off is only played if need to decide champion, teams for relegation or UEFA competition and will be played on a neutral ground).
(C) Champions; (O) Play-off winners

=== Results ===
Home \ Away	HAK	HJK	ILV	KPS	SJK	VPS
Haka	—	—	—	—	0–3	2–3
HJK	0–1	—	0–1	—	2–2	—
Ilves	3–2	—	—	1–0	4–0	—
KuPS	2–0	1–0	—	—	—	3–1
SJK	—	—	—	0–1	—	1–4
VPS	—	1–1	0–2	—	—	—

Source: Flashscore
Legend: Blue = home team win; Yellow = draw; Red = away team win.

== Relegation Round ==
=== League table ===
Pos	Team	Pld	W	D	L	GF	GA	GD	Pts	Qualification or relegation
1	Inter Turku	27	12	5	10	46	34	+12	41	Qualification for the Conference League first qualifying round play-off quarter-finals
2	Gnistan	27	10	7	10	40	43	−3	37	Qualification for the Conference League first qualifying round play-off quarter-finals
3	Oulu	27	7	7	13	32	40	−8	28	
4	Mariehamn	27	7	5	15	27	44	−17	26	
5	Lahti (R)	27	4	12	11	31	47	−16	24	Qualification for the Veikkausliiga play-off
6	EIF (R)	27	4	7	16	24	57	−33	19	Relegation to the Ykkösliiga

Source: Flashscore
Rules for classification: 1) Points; 2) Goal difference; 3) Goals scored; 4) Head-to-head points; 5) Head-to-head goal difference; 6) Head-to-head away goals scored; 7) Play-off
(Note: Play-off is only played if need to decide champion, teams for relegation or UEFA competition and will be played on a neutral ground).
(R) Relegated

=== Results ===
Home \ Away	EIF	GNI	INT	LAH	MAR	OUL
EIF	—	3–1	—	—	—	1–1
Gnistan	—	—	—	2–2	2–1	1–0
Inter Turku	1–1	3–2	—	3–1	—	—
Lahti	0–0	—	—	—	2–1	—
Mariehamn	3–0	—	0–1	—	—	—
Oulu	—	—	1–0	3–0	1–2	—

Source: Flashscore
Legend: Blue = home team win; Yellow = draw; Red = away team win.

== Results by round ==
Team ╲ Round	1	2	3	4	5	6	7	8	9	10	11	12	13	14	15	16	17	18	19	20	21	22	23	24	25	26	27
AC Oulu	L	D	D	L	L	D	D	L	W	L	D	D	W	L	W	W	L	L	W	L	L	L	W	W	L	D	L
Ekenäs IF	L	L	D	L	D	L	D	L	L	W	L	L	W	W	L	L	L	L	L	L	L	D	D	W	L	D	D
FC Haka	L	W	D	D	W	W	L	W	L	W	W	D	L	W	W	L	L	W	D	L	W	D	L	L	L	W	L
FC Inter Turku	L	D	D	W	L	L	L	L	L	W	W	L	D	W	W	W	D	W	L	W	L	W	D	L	W	W	W
FC Lahti	D	L	D	L	L	W	D	L	L	L	D	D	D	L	L	L	D	W	W	D	D	D	L	W	L	D	D
HJK	L	W	W	D	D	D	W	L	W	D	L	W	W	W	W	L	W	W	L	W	W	W	D	D	L	L	L
IF Gnistan	W	W	L	L	L	D	D	L	D	W	L	L	D	L	L	D	W	W	W	W	W	D	W	L	W	D	L
IFK Mariehamn	W	D	L	L	W	L	D	D	W	L	D	W	L	L	L	L	L	L	D	L	L	W	L	L	W	L	W
Ilves	D	L	L	W	W	W	W	W	D	L	D	W	D	D	W	L	W	W	W	L	W	D	W	W	W	W	W
KuPS	W	D	D	W	D	W	D	W	W	W	W	L	L	L	W	W	W	W	D	W	W	L	W	L	W	W	W
SJK	W	D	W	D	W	D	L	W	W	L	L	W	D	W	W	W	D	D	W	L	L	D	D	W	L	L	L
VPS	W	D	W	W	W	L	W	L	W	W	D	D	D	L	L	L	W	L	L	W	D	L	L	D	W	L	W

Source: veikkausliiga.com (in Finnish)
W = Win; D = Draw; L = Lose

== Play-offs ==
=== Conference League play-off ===
Teams placed 4th-8th entered play-off matches for the second spot in the Conference League first qualifying round; the 4th-placed team received a bye to the final. The quarter and semi-finals are held over one leg (with the higher-placed team gaining home advantage), while the final is held over two legs.

==== Quarter-finals ====
23 October 2024	Haka (6th)	2–1 (a.e.t.)	Inter Turku (7th)	Valkeakoski
13:00 BST	Olusanya 73'; Bah-Traoré 114'		Botué 40'	Stadium: Tehtaan kenttä

23 October 2024	VPS (5th)	0–1	Gnistan (8th)	Vaasa
13:00 BST			Penninkangas 78'	Stadium: Hietalahti

==== Semi-finals ====
26 October 2024	Haka (6th)	3–3 (a.e.t.) (4–3 p)	Gnistan (8th)	Valkeakoski
15:00 BST	Olusanya 32'; Whyte 89'; Dantas 115'		Väyrynen 68'; Heiskanen 83'; Latonenn 109'	Stadium: Tehtaan kenttä
	Penalties
	Lanquedoc (penalty scored); Mastokangas (penalty scored); Olusanya (penalty scored); Dantas (penalty missed); Whyte (penalty scored)		Väyrynen (penalty scored); Pyyskänen (penalty scored); Eremenko (penalty scored); Kabashi (penalty missed); Tatar (penalty missed)

==== Final ====
===== First leg =====
30 October 2024	Haka (6th)	1–2	SJK (4th)	Valkeakoski
16:00 BST	Fall 66'		Streng 45'; Moreno 80'	Stadium: Tehtaan kenttä

===== Second leg =====
2 November 2024	SJK (4th)	2–2 (4–3 agg.)	Haka (6th)	Seinäjoki
12:30 BST				Stadium: OmaSP Stadion

=== Veikkausliiga play-off ===
The eleventh-placed team (Lahti) faced the second-placed team from the 2024 Ykkösliiga (Jaro) in a two-legged play-off for the final place in the 2025 Veikkausliiga.

==== First leg ====
23 October 2024	Jaro	2–0	Lahti	Jakobstad
16:30 BST	Crona 35'; Eremenko 52' (pen.)			Stadium: Centralplan

==== Second leg ====
27 October 2024	Lahti	1–0 (1–2 agg.)	Jaro	Lahti
14:00 BST	Luquinhas 56' (pen.)			Stadium: Lahden Stadion

== Season statistics ==
=== Top goalscorers ===
As of 2 November 2024

Rank	Player	Club	Goals
1	(England) Ashley Coffey	AC Oulu	12
1	(Nicaragua) Jaime Moreno	SJK	12
3	(Finland) Joakim Latonen	Gnistan	11
3	(Finland) Roope Riski	Ilves	11
3	(Sweden) Adam Larsson	IFK Mariehamn	11
6	(Denmark) Mads Borchers	VPS	10
6	(Finland) Santeri Haarala	Ilves	10
8	(Argentina) Michael López	Lahti	9
8	(Belgium) Evangelos Patoulidis	Haka	9
8	(South Africa) Darren Smith	Inter Turku	9
8	(Finland) Anthony Olusanya	HJK / Haka	9
12	(Senegal) Maissa Fall	Haka	8
12	(Finland) Kasper Paananen	SJK	8
14	(Finland) Teemu Hytönen	VPS	7
14	(Finland) Rasmus Karjalainen	SJK	7
14	(Finland) Salomo Ojala	EIF	7
14	(Finland) Petteri Pennanen	KuPS	7
14	(Burkina Faso) Jean Botué	Inter Turku	7
19	(Finland) Topi Keskinen	HJK	6
19	(England) Luke Plange	HJK	6
19	(Finland) Vertti Hänninen	Gnistan	6
19	(Australia) Luke Ivanovic	Lahti	6

=== Hat-tricks ===
As of 7 June 2024

Player	For	Against	Result	Date
(Finland) Joakim Latonen	Gnistan	Ilves	6–4 (A)	13 April 2024
(England) Luke Plange	HJK	SJK	4–1 (H)	7 June 2024

== Awards ==
=== Annual awards ===
Award	Winner	Club
Player of the Year	(Finland) Petteri Pennanen	KuPS
Goalkeeper of the Year	(Austria) Johannes Kreidl	KuPS
Defender of the Year	(Finland) Juhani Pikkarainen	Ilves
Midfielder of the Year	(Finland) Petteri Pennanen	KuPS
Striker of the Year	(England) Ashley Coffey	AC Oulu
Rookie of the Year	(Finland) Matias Siltanen	KuPS
Manager of the Year	(Finland) Jani Honkavaara	KuPS

=== Monthly awards ===
Month	Coach of the Month	Player of the Month
April	(Finland) Toni Lehtinen (SJK)	(Finland) Topi Keskinen (HJK)
May	(Finland) Jani Honkavaara (KuPS)	(England) Ashley Coffey (AC Oulu)
June	(Finland) Toni Korkeakunnas (HJK)	(Nicaragua) Jaime Moreno (SJK)
July	(Finland) Jani Honkavaara (KuPS) (2)	(Finland) Santeri Haarala (Ilves)
August	(Finland) Jussi Leppälahti (Gnistan)	(Finland) Tim Väyrynen (Gnistan)
September	(Finland) Joonas Rantanen (Ilves)	(Nigeria) Adeleke Akinyemi (Ilves)
October	(Finland) Jani Honkavaara (KuPS) (3)	(Finland) Petteri Pennanen (KuPS)

=== Team of the Year ===

Team of the Year
Goalkeeper	(Austria) Johannes Kreidl (KuPS)			
Defence	(Ghana) Clinton Antwi (KuPS)	(Finland) Juhani Pikkarainen (Ilves)	(Ivory Coast) Ibrahim Cissé (KuPS)	(Finland) Saku Heiskanen (Gnistan)
Midfield	(Finland) Petteri Pennanen (KuPS)	(Finland) Anton Popovitch (Ilves)	(Finland) Joona Veteli (Ilves)	(Finland) Oiva Jukkola (Ilves)
Attack	(Nicaragua) Jaime Moreno (SJK)		(Finland) Santeri Haarala (Ilves)	

Manager	(Finland) Jani Honkavaara (KuPS)
Director	(Finland) Miika Takkula (Ilves)

== Attendance ==
Pos	Team	Total	High	Low	Average	Change
1	HJK	85,069	8,835		6,363	+13.0%
2	Ilves	80,941	8,017		5,782	+128.2%
3	KuPS	49,843	8,543		3,560	+26.4%
4	SJK	40,384	4,619		3,106	+1.2%
5	VPS	37,727	3,412		2,961	+10.6%
6	FC Inter Turku	35,967	4,023		2,511	−17.0%
7	FC Lahti	29,315	3,471		2,255	+3.7%
8	Haka	29,116	4,347		2,240	−11.8%
9	Gnistan	29,838	3,024		2,131	+161.8%^{†}
10	AC Oulu	24,336	2,929		1,738	−10.5%
11	IFK Mariehamn	17,446	1,723		1,342	+14.4%
12	EIF	15,053	1,640		1,158	+24.2%^{†}
	League total	473,225	8,835		2,957	+9.3%

Notes:
^{†} Promoted from 2023 Ykkönen

== See also ==
Competitions

- 2024 Ykkösliiga
- 2024 Ykkönen
- 2024 Kakkonen
- 2024 Finnish Cup

Team seasons

- 2024 HJK season
- 2024 Kuopion Palloseura season
- 2024 Vaasan Palloseura season
