= 2026 Veikkausliiga =

Veikkausliiga
- Season: 2026
- Dates: 4 April - 1 November 2026
- Champions: Inter Turku
- Relegated: IFK Mariehamn
- Champions League: Inter Turku
- Conference League: HJK; AC Oulu; KuPS
- Matches: 58
- Goals: 141 (2.43 per match)
- Top goalscorer: Rasmus Karjalainen (7)
- Biggest home win: IF Gnistan 5–0 FF Jaro (16 May 2026); FC Lahti 5–0 Ilves (30 May 2026)
- Biggest away win: IF Gnistan 1–5 AC Oulu (4 April 2026)
- Highest scoring: IF Gnistan 1–5 AC Oulu (4 April 2026)
- Highest attendance: 8,102; Inter Turku 2–1 TPS (23 May 2026)
- All statistics correct as of 23 May 2026.

The 2026 Veikkausliiga is the 96th season of top-tier football in Finland, which takes place from April to November. Veikkaus is the league's main sponsor.

== Teams ==
The league consists of twelve teams; ten teams remaining from the previous season, and two teams promoted from the Ykkösliiga. KuPS entered the season as defending champions.

=== Team changes ===
Promoted from 2025 Ykkösliiga	Relegated to 2026 Ykkösliiga
FC Lahti; TPS	FC Haka; KTP

The promoted teams are the 2025 Ykkösliiga champions FC Lahti (returning to the top flight after a single-season absence), and 2025 Veikkausliiga play-off winners TPS (returning to the top flight after a five-year absence). They replaced the 2025 Veikkausliiga bottom-placed team FC Haka (relegated after a six-year stint in the top flight), and Veikkausliiga play-off losers KTP (relegated after a single season).

=== Stadiums and locations ===
Location of teams in 2026 Veikkausliiga

Club	Location	Stadium	Turf	Capacity
AC Oulu	Oulu	Raatti Stadium	Natural	4,392
FC Inter	Turku	Veritas Stadion	Artificial	9,072
FC Lahti	Lahti	Lahti Stadium	Natural	7,465
FF Jaro	Jakobstad (Pietarsaari)	Project Liv Arena	Artificial	3,600
HJK	Töölö, Helsinki	Bolt Arena	Artificial	10,770
IF Gnistan	Oulunkylä, Helsinki	Markku.fi Areena	Artificial	2,700
IFK Mariehamn	Mariehamn	Wiklöf Holding Arena	Artificial	1,635
Ilves	Tampere	Tammelan Stadion	Artificial	8,017
KuPS	Kuopio	Väre Areena	Artificial	5,000
SJK	Seinäjoki	OmaSP Stadion	Artificial	6,075
TPS	Turku	Veritas Stadion	Artificial	9,072
VPS	Vaasa	Hietalahti Stadium	Artificial	6,009

=== Personnel and kits ===
All teams are obligated to have the Veikkausliiga logo on the right sleeve of their shirt.

Note: Flags indicate national team as has been defined under FIFA eligibility rules. Players and Managers may hold more than one non-FIFA nationality.

Team	Head coach	Captain	Kit manufacturer
AC Oulu	(Finland) Mikko Isokangas	(Finland) Rasmus Karjalainen	Craft
FC Inter	(Finland) Vesa Vasara	(Finland) Juuso Hämäläinen	Nike
FC Lahti	(Portugal) Gonçalo Pereira	(Finland) Matias Vainionpää	Adidas
FF Jaro	(Sweden) Jens Karlsson	(Sweden) Erik Gunnarsson	Puma
HJK	(Finland) Joonas Rantanen	(Finland) Alexander Ring	Adidas
IF Gnistan	(Finland) Jussi Leppälahti	(Russia) Yevgeni Bashkirov	Puma
IFK Mariehamn	(England) Gary Williams	(Finland) Sebastian Dahlström	Puma
Ilves	(Finland) Joni Lehtonen	(Finland) Sauli Väisänen	Adidas
KuPS	(Finland) Miika Nuutinen	(Finland) Petteri Pennanen	Puma
SJK	(Finland) Jarkko Wiss	(Finland) Markus Arsalo	Adidas
TPS	(Spain) Ivan Piñol	(Finland) Atte Sihvonen	Puma
VPS	(Finland) Jussi Nuorela	(Finland) Martti Haukioja	Nike

== Regular season ==
=== League table ===
Pos	Team	Pld	W	D	L	GF	GA	GD	Pts	Qualification
1	KuPS	22	12	7	3	38	23	+15	43	Qualification for the Championship Round
2	Inter Turku	22	11	9	2	29	16	+13	42	Qualification for the Championship Round
3	HJK	22	11	4	7	36	27	+9	37	Qualification for the Championship Round
4	IF Gnistan	22	10	6	6	36	29	+7	36	Qualification for the Championship Round
5	AC Oulu	22	10	4	8	25	25	0	34	Qualification for the Championship Round
6	VPS	22	9	6	7	29	22	+7	33	Qualification for the Championship Round
7	FC Lahti	22	9	5	8	26	19	+7	32	Qualification for the Relegation Round
8	TPS	22	8	7	7	28	23	+5	31	Qualification for the Relegation Round
9	Ilves	22	7	4	11	34	37	−3	25	Qualification for the Relegation Round
10	SJK	22	4	7	11	25	33	−8	19	Qualification for the Relegation Round
11	FF Jaro	22	3	6	13	18	44	−26	15	Qualification for the Relegation Round
12	IFK Mariehamn	22	3	5	14	17	43	−26	14	Qualification for the Relegation Round

Source: Flashscore
Rules for classification: 1) Points; 2) Goal difference; 3) Goals scored; 4) Head-to-head points; 5) Head-to-head goal difference; 6) Head-to-head away goals scored; 7) Play-off
(Note: Play-off is only played if need to decide champion, teams for relegation or UEFA competition and will be played on a neutral ground).

=== Results ===
Home \ Away	OUL	INT	LAH	JAR	HJK	GNI	MAR	ILV	KPS	SJK	TPS	VPS
AC Oulu	—	2–3	1–1	2–1	0–1	0–2	2–1	1–0	2–0	0–0	1–0	1–0
Inter Turku	0–0	—	0–0	2–0	1–1	1–2	1–0	2–1	1–0	1–1	2–1	0–0
FC Lahti	2–1	0–2	—	2–0	2–0	1–0	1–1	5–0	1–2	2–3	0–0	1–1
FF Jaro	0–1	0–0	0–1	—	2–5	1–1	3–0	2–1	1–1	2–1	2–2	1–3
HJK	0–1	3–3	1–0	3–0	—	2–3	1–0	2–2	0–4	3–0	1–0	2–1
IF Gnistan	1–5	2–0	1–0	5–0	0–3	—	4–2	3–2	0–1	3–2	1–1	1–1
IFK Mariehamn	1–1	0–2	0–2	2–0	0–4	0–3	—	2–2	1–1	2–0	1–1	0–1
Ilves	1–0	1–3	1–0	5–0	1–2	2–0	2–0	—	1–3	2–2	1–0	0–1
KuPS	3–2	1–1	2–1	3–0	1–1	1–0	2–4	4–3	—	0–0	1–1	3–1
SJK	0–1	1–3	1–2	1–1	3–0	2–2	3–0	1–1	0–2	—	3–1	1–2
TPS	3–0	0–0	2–1	3–2	1–0	1–1	3–0	1–3	1–2	2–0	—	1–0
VPS	5–1	0–1	0–1	0–0	2–1	1–1	4–0	3–2	1–1	1–0	1–3	—

Source: Flashscore
Legend: Blue = home team win; Yellow = draw; Red = away team win.

== Championship round ==
=== League table ===
Pos	Team	Pld	W	D	L	GF	GA	GD	Pts	Qualification
1	Inter Turku (C)	32	17	10	5	43	27	+16	61	Qualification for the Champions League first qualifying round
2	HJK	32	17	8	7	66	39	+27	59	Qualification for the Conference League second qualifying round (Note: Inter Turku qualified for the Conference League second qualifying round as the 2026 Finnish Cup winners. Since they won the championship, the spot passed to the second-placed team.)
3	KuPS	32	14	11	7	46	33	+13	53	Qualification for the Conference League first qualifying round
4	AC Oulu	32	14	6	12	41	40	+1	48	Qualification for the Conference League first qualifying round
5	IF Gnistan	32	12	10	10	52	47	+5	46	
6	VPS	32	11	7	14	32	43	−11	40	

Source: Flashscore
Rules for classification: 1) Points; 2) Goal difference; 3) Goals scored; 4) Head-to-head points; 5) Head-to-head goal difference; 6) Head-to-head away goals scored; 7) Play-off
(Note: Play-off is only played if need to decide champion, teams for relegation or UEFA competition and will be played on a neutral ground).
(C) Champions

=== Results ===
Home \ Away	OUL	INT	HJK	GNI	KPS	VPS
AC Oulu	—	0–1	3–4	1–2	2–0	0–0
Inter Turku	1–2	—	2–4	4–3	1–0	1–0
HJK	3–3	2–1	—	4–0	2–2	6–0
IF Gnistan	3–4	0–0	1–1	—	1–1	5–1
KuPS	0–1	0–2	0–0	1–1	—	2–0
VPS	1–0	0–1	0–4	1–0	0–2	—

Legend: Blue = home team win; Yellow = draw; Red = away team win.

== Relegation round ==
=== League table ===
Pos	Team	Pld	W	D	L	GF	GA	GD	Pts	Qualification or relegation
1	FC Lahti	27	11	6	10	35	26	+9	39	
2	Ilves	27	11	5	11	45	39	+6	38	
3	TPS	27	8	8	11	29	33	−4	32	
4	SJK	27	6	9	12	29	37	−8	27	
5	FF Jaro (O)	27	4	9	14	22	49	−27	21	Qualification for the Veikkausliiga play-off
6	IFK Mariehamn (R)	27	4	7	16	22	49	−27	19	Relegation to the 2027 Ykkösliiga

Source: Flashscore
Rules for classification: 1) Points; 2) Goal difference; 3) Goals scored; 4) Head-to-head points; 5) Head-to-head goal difference; 6) Head-to-head away goals scored; 7) Play-off
(Note: Play-off is only played if need to decide champion, teams for relegation or UEFA competition and will be played on a neutral ground).
(O) Play-off winners; (R) Relegated

=== Results ===
Home \ Away	LAH	JAR	MAR	ILV	SJK	TPS
FC Lahti	—	1–1	2–1	—	—	5–1
FF Jaro	—	—	1–1	—	1–1	—
IFK Mariehamn	—	—	—	1–1	—	1–0
Ilves	3–1	2–0	—	—	2–0	—
SJK	1–0	—	2–1	—	—	—
TPS	—	0–1	—	0–3	0–0	—

Legend: Blue = home team win; Yellow = draw; Red = away team win.

== Veikkausliiga play-off ==
The eleventh-placed team (FF Jaro) faced the second-placed team of the 2026 Ykkösliiga (PK-35) in a two-legged play-off for the final place in the 2027 Veikkausliiga.

=== First leg ===
21 October 2026	PK-35	1–1	FF Jaro	Helsinki
19:00	Uchiyama 2'		Myrevik 27'	Stadium: Oulunkylä Football Stadium

=== Second leg ===
25 October 2026	FF Jaro	1–0 (2–1 agg.)	PK-35	Jakobstad
18:00	Lawson 72'			Stadium: Project Liv Arena

== Positions by round ==
Team ╲ Round	1	2	3	4	5	6	7	8	9	10	11	12	13	14	15	16	17	18	19	20	21	22	23	24	25	26	27	28	29	30	31	32
Inter Turku	7	4	2	1	1	1	1	1	1	1	1	1	1	1	2	2	2	2	2	2	2	2	2	2	2	1	1	1	1			
HJK	2	5	4	4	5	5	4	5	4	4	4	4	4	5	5	5	3	4	3	3	4	3	3	3	3	3	2	2	2			
KuPS	3	2	3	3	4	4	2	2	2	3	3	2	2	2	1	1	1	1	1	1	1	1	1	1	1	2	3	3	3			
AC Oulu	1	1	1	2	3	3	3	3	3	2	2	3	3	3	4	4	6	3	5	6	6	5	6	6	6	5	6	5	4			
IF Gnistan	12	12	12	12	10	10	7	8	8	6	5	6	6	7	6	6	4	5	6	4	3	4	4	4	4	4	4	4	5			
VPS	8	8	8	8	8	8	6	4	6	7	6	5	5	4	3	3	5	6	4	5	5	6	5	5	5	6	5	6	6			
FC Lahti	4	6	7	6	7	7	8	9	7	8	9	9	9	8	8	7	7	7	7	8	8	7	7	7	7	7	7					
Ilves	10	11	11	11	9	9	10	7	9	9	8	8	8	9	9	9	9	9	9	9	9	9	9	9	8	8	8					
TPS	6	7	6	5	2	2	5	6	5	5	7	7	7	6	7	8	8	8	8	7	7	8	8	8	9	9	9					
SJK	11	3	5	7	6	6	9	11	11	11	10	10	10	10	10	10	11	10	10	10	10	10	10	10	10	10	10					
FF Jaro	9	9	10	9	11	11	12	12	10	10	11	11	11	11	11	11	10	11	11	11	11	11	11	12	12	11	11					
IFK Mariehamn	5	10	9	10	12	12	11	12	12	12	12	12	12	12	12	12	12	12	12	12	12	12	12	11	11	12	12					

Leader and 2027–28 UEFA Champions League first qualifying round
Conference League first qualifying round
Veikkausliiga play-off
Relegation to 2027 Ykkösliiga

Updated to match(es) played on 25 October 2026. Source: Veikkausliiga

== Results by round ==
Team ╲ Round	1	2	3	4	5	6	7	8	9	10	11	12	13	14	15	16	17	18	19	20	21	22	23	24	25	26	27	28	29	30	31	32
IF Gnistan	L	L	L	D	W	D	W	L	W	W	W	D	D	L	W	W	W	L	D	W	W	D	D									
HJK	W	L	W	D	W	L	D	L	W	W	D	W	L	D	L	W	W	L	W	W	L	W										
Ilves	L	L	D	L	D	W	D	W	L	W	W	L	D	L	L	W	W	L	W	L	L	L	W									
Inter Turku	D	W	W	W	L	W	W	W	D	D	D	D	D	D	W	D	L	W	D	W	D	W										
FF Jaro	L	D	D	D	D	L	L	W	L	L	L	D	L	W	L	D	W	L	L	L	L	L	L									
KuPS	W	W	D	D	L	D	D	W	D	D	W	W	W	W	W	W	W	W	D	W	L	L	D									
FC Lahti	W	L	L	W	L	D	D	L	W	L	L	D	D	W	W	W	L	W	D	L	W	W	W									
IFK Mariehamn	D	L	D	L	L	D	D	L	L	L	L	L	L	L	L	L	D	L	L	W	W	W	L									
AC Oulu	W	W	W	L	W	L	W	W	W	D	W	L	D	L	L	L	D	W	L	L	W	D	L									
SJK	L	W	L	D	D	D	L	L	L	W	L	D	D	W	L	L	L	W	D	L	L	D	D									
TPS	D	W	W	D	D	W	L	L	W	L	L	D	W	L	W	L	L	W	D	W	D	D	D									
VPS	D	D	L	W	W	D	D	W	L	D	W	W	D	W	W	L	L	L	W	L	W	L	W									

Updated to match(es) played on 8 September 2026. Source: Soccerstats.com (in English)
W = Win; D = Draw; L = Lose; P = Postponed

== Season statistics ==
=== Top goalscorers ===
As of 31 August 2026

Rank	Player	Club	Goals
1	(Nigeria) Adeleke Akinyemi	Gnistan	13
2	(Finland) Rasmus Karjalainen	AC Oulu	10
2	(Sierra Leone) Alie Conteh	Inter Turku	10
2	(Nicaragua) Jaime Moreno	KuPS	10
2	(Finland) Teemu Hytönen	Ilves	10
2	(Sweden) Jardell Kanga	Ilves	10
7	(Denmark) Mads Borchers	HJK	9
7	(Finland) Albijon Muzaci	TPS	9
9	(Sweden) Herman Sjögrell	Jaro/Inter Turku	7
9	(Australia) Luka Smyth	VPS	7
9	(Finland) Simon Lindholm	VPS	7
