= Maissa Fall =

Senegalese footballer (born 1995)

Personal information
- Full name: Maissa El Hadji Fall
- Date of birth: 6 March 1995 (age 31)
- Place of birth: Linguère, Senegal
- Height: 1.93 m (6 ft 4 in)
- Position: Midfielder

Team information
- Current team: Gimhae
- Number: 99

Senior career*
Years	Team	Apps	(Gls)
2014–2015	Camaiore	0	(0)
2015–2016	Colligiana	23	(3)
2016–2017	Ponsacco	16	(4)
2017	Lavagnese	9	(1)
2018	Valdinievole Montecatini	2	(0)
2018	Real Forte Querceta	14	(0)
2019	Andrézieux-Bouthéon	2	(0)
2019–2021	Lealtad	40	(7)
2021–2023	Sandecja Nowy Sącz	51	(3)
2023–2024	Haka	40	(10)
2025	VPS	24	(11)
2026–	Gimhae	16	(2)
- * Club domestic league appearances and goals as of 8 August 2026

Maissa El-Hadji Fall (born 6 March 1995) is a Senegalese professional footballer who plays as a midfielder for K League 2 club Gimhae.

== Early life ==
Fall was born in Linguère, Senegal, and moved to Dakar at an early age, living mostly with his grandparents. He started playing football in a local club, and aged 18 he moved to Italy where his family was already living. He also trialed with Hellas Verona, but the official transfer collapsed due to financial claim from his Senegalese club.

== Career ==
Fall started his senior career playing in Italian Serie D for Camaiore, Colligiana, Ponsacco, Lavagnese, Montecatini and Real Forte Querceta between 2014 and 2018. In the early 2019, he had a brief stint in France when he signed with Andrézieux-Bouthéon in National 2.

He joined Spanish side CD Lealtad in the summer 2019. They finished as the 2019–20 Tercera División Group 2 winners, and eventually were promoted to Segunda División B.

Since summer 2021, he played two seasons for Sandecja Nowy Sącz in Polish second-tier I liga. In November 2022, during a penalty shoot-out in a Polish Cup match against Śląsk Wrocław, the Slask supporters were yelling racist insults to him. He informed the referee of this but the referee commanded him to shoot a penalty nevertheless. However, the captain of Sandecja told the referee that out of the solidarity, the team refused to continue the penalty shoot-out and left to locker room. Sandecja were ordered to lose the match. Fall left Poland when Sandecja were relegated after the 2022–23 season.

In the 2023 summer transfer window, Fall moved to Finnish Veikkausliiga club Haka on a short contract. After the season in early November 2023, his contract with Haka was extended for the 2024 season, and he moved to more attacking position.

In March 2025 Fall signed with VPS. On 26 September 2025, Fall scored for VPS in the relegation round against his former club Haka in a 1–0 victory.

On 19 February 2026, Fall announce official transfer to K League 2 promoted club, Gimhae for 2026 season.

== Personal life ==
Born in Senegal, Fall has a dual citizenship of Senegal and Italy. He is married and a father of a daughter.

== Career statistics ==
As of 19 February 2026

Appearances and goals by club, season and competition
Club	Season	League			National cup (Note: Includes Copa del Rey, Polish Cup and Suomen Cup)		League cup (Note: Includes Coppa Italia Serie D and Finnish League Cup)		Europe		Total	
Club	Season	Division	Apps	Goals	Apps	Goals	Apps	Goals	Apps	Goals	Apps	Goals
Colligiana	2015–16	Serie D	23	3	–		–		–		23	3
Ponsacco	2016–17	Serie D	16	4	–		–		–		16	4
Lavagnese	2017–18	Serie D	9	1	–		1	0	–		10	1
Valdinievole Montecatini	2017–18	Serie D	2	0	–		–		–		2	0
Real Forte Querceta	2018–19	Serie D	14	0	–		3	0	–		17	0
Andrézieux-Bouthéon	2018–19	National 2	2	0	–		–		–		2	0
Andrézieux-Bouthéon	2019–20	National 2	0	0	–		–		–		0	0
Andrézieux-Bouthéon	Total		2	0	0	0	–	–	–	–	41	7
Lealtad	2019–20	Tercera División	16	3	0	0	–		–		16	3
Lealtad	2020–21	Segunda División B	24	4	1	0	–		–		25	4
Lealtad	Total		40	7	1	0	–	–	–	–	41	7
Sandecja Nowy Sącz	2021–22	I liga	28	1	1	0	–		–		29	1
Sandecja Nowy Sącz	2022–23	I liga	23	2	3	0	–		–		26	2
Sandecja Nowy Sącz	Total		51	3	4	0	–	–	–	–	55	3
Haka	2023	Veikkausliiga	11	2	0	0	0	0	0	0	11	2
Haka	2024	Veikkausliiga	29	8	4	0	3	0	–		36	8
Haka	Total		40	10	4	0	3	0	–	–	47	9
VPS	2025	Veikkausliiga	24	11	2	1	0	0	–		26	12
Gimhae	2026	K League 2	0	0	0	0	–				0	0
Career total			219	38	11	1	7	0	0	0	237	40

== Honours ==
Lealtad

- Tercera División Group 2: 2019–20
