= Jaime Moreno =

Jaime Moreno may refer to:

- Jaime Moreno (footballer, born 1974), Bolivian footballer
- Jaime Moreno (footballer, born 1995), Nicaraguan footballer
