= Ossi Virta =

Finnish football manager (born 1988)

Personal information
- Full name: Ossi-Pekka Juhani Virta
- Date of birth: 9 July 1988 (age 38)
- Place of birth: Helsinki, Finland

Team information
- Current team: Finland U17 (head coach)

Youth career
- KäPa

Senior career*
Years	Team	Apps	(Gls)
- KäPa

Managerial career
- 2005–2014: KäPa (youth)
- 2015: SJK II
- 2016–2020: KTP (assistant)
- 2016: KTP (interim)
- 2021: KäPa
- 2022–2023: Haka II
- 2022–2023: Haka (assistant)
- 2023: HJK (assistant)
- 2024: HJK
- 2024: HJK (assistant)
- 2025: KTP (assistant)
- 2026–: Finland U17
- * Club domestic league appearances and goals as of 14 March 2024

Ossi-Pekka Juhani Virta (born 9 July 1988) is a Finnish football coach and a former player. He is the head coach of the Finland U17 national team. Virta has completed UEFA Pro -coaching license in March 2023.

== Playing career ==
Virta started playing football with Käpylän Pallo (KäPa) youth sector in 1992. He also played for the club's first team in the third-tier Kakkonen.

== Coaching career ==
Virta started his coaching career also in KäPa youth sector in 2005, where he coached several youth teams during his 10-year spell. He worked also as a coaching director for the club.

On 15 April 2015, Virta was named the director of SJK Akatemia. He also worked in the coaching staff of head coach Simo Valakari for SJK first team in Veikkausliiga.

During 2016–2020, he worked for Kotkan Työväen Palloilijat (KTP) as a youth coach, assistant coach and interim head coach. He left the club after the 2020 season, when he was named the head coach of KäPa in third-tier Kakkonen.

After one season with KäPa, Virta signed with Veikkausliiga side FC Haka on 5 November 2021 as an academy director, and simultaneously joined the coaching staff of Teemu Tainio in the Haka first team. During his time in Haka, Virta gained a relatively wide popularity in social media with his passionate goal celebrations.

=== HJK Helsinki ===
In July 2023, Virta was named the assistant coach of HJK Helsinki, after Haka and HJK had agreed on a fee for his contract. Virta joined the coaching staff of Toni Korkeakunnas on a deal until the end of 2024, with a club option. He became a viral social media hit again during HJK's 2023–24 UEFA Europa Conference League campaign with his rapid and accurate half-time live analyses. In January 2024, Virta was unexpectedly named the manager of HJK for the 2024 Veikkausliiga season, after it was revealed that a newly recruited head coach Ferran Sibila lacks the required UEFA Pro -coaching license. According to his contract with the club, Virta works as a manager until Sibila is able to attend and start the UEFA Pro coaching class. Sibila was sacked on 20 May 2024, and Virta continued as an assistant coach for newly returned manager Toni Korkeakunnas. He left the club after the season.
