= 2022 Ykkönen =

Ykkönen
- Season: 2022
- Champions: KPT
- Promoted: KPT
- Relegated: PK35; PEPO; PIF

The 2022 Ykkönen was the 51st season of Ykkönen in its current format as the second tier of Finnish football since its inception in 1973. The season began on 18 April 2022 and ended on 8 October 2022.

== Teams ==
Twelve teams compete in the league. Following the 2021 season, VPS (champions) were promoted to the Veikkausliiga. They were replaced by KPT, who were relegated from the first tier. Klubi 04, MuSa and JIPPO were relegated to Kakkonen and replaced by the 2021 Kakkonen champions, JaPs, Pargas IF and SJK Akatemia.

=== Stadiums and locations ===
Location of teams in 2022 Ykkönen

The following teams are participating in the 2022 Ykkönen season.

Club	Location	Stadium	Capacity	Manager
Ekenäs IF	Ekenäs	Ekenäs Sparbank Arena	2,500	(Finland) Johan Esteves
FF Jaro	Jakobstad	Jakobstads Centralplan	5,000	(Finland) Niklas Vidjeskog
Gnistan	Helsinki	Mustapekka Areena	1,000	(Finland) Jussi Leppälahti
JaPS	Järvenpää	Järvenpään keskuskenttä	1,000	(Finland) Jani Sarajärvi
KPV	Kokkola	Kokkolan keskuskenttä	3,000	(Finland) Janne Hyppönen
KPT Koparit	Kotka	Arto Tolsa Areena	4,780	(Finland) Argo Arumäe
MP	Mikkeli	Mikkelin Urheilupuisto	7,000	(Finland) Juha Pasoja
PEPO	Lappeenranta	Kimpinen Sports Center	5,000	(Finland) Mika Lahtinen
Pargas IF	Pargas	Pajbacka Idrottsplan	1,000	(Finland) Sami Ristilä
PK-35	Vantaa	Myyrmäen jalkapallostadion	4,700	(Finland) Jari Pyykölä
SJK Akatemia	Seinäjoki	OmaSP Stadion	6,000	(Finland) Stevie Grieve
TPS	Turku	Veritas Stadion	9,372	(Finland) Jonatan Johansson

== Regular season ==
=== League table ===
Pos	Team	Pld	W	D	L	GF	GA	GD	Pts	Qualification
1	KTP	22	14	4	4	44	20	+24	46	Qualification for the Promotion Round
2	TPS	22	13	6	3	39	16	+23	45	Qualification for the Promotion Round
3	FF Jaro	22	10	5	7	43	25	+18	35	Qualification for the Promotion Round
4	EIF	22	8	8	6	39	34	+5	32	Qualification for the Promotion Round
5	KPV	22	8	8	6	24	32	−8	32	Qualification for the Promotion Round
6	JaPS	22	9	4	9	31	39	−8	31	Qualification for the Promotion Round
7	Gnistan	22	8	6	8	35	31	+4	30	Qualification for the Relegation Round
8	MP	22	7	6	9	35	33	+2	27	Qualification for the Relegation Round
9	SJK Akatemia	22	6	7	9	31	32	−1	25	Qualification for the Relegation Round
10	PEPO	22	6	6	10	25	38	−13	24	Qualification for the Relegation Round
11	PK-35	22	5	7	10	28	44	−16	22	Qualification for the Relegation Round
12	Pargas IF	22	4	1	17	21	51	−30	13	Qualification for the Relegation Round

Source: Soccerway
Rules for classification: 1) Points; 2) Goal difference; 3) Goals scored; 4) Head-to-head points; 5) Head-to-head goal difference; 6) Head-to-head away goals scored; 7) Play-off
(Note: Play-off is only played if need to decide champion, teams for relegation or UEFA competition and will be played on a neutral ground).

=== Results ===
Home \ Away	EIF	GNS	JAR	JPS	KPV	KTP	MIP	PEP	PKK	PIF	SJK	TPS
EIF	—	0–2	2–1	0–3	0–3	2–0	2–2	2–1	2–1	4–0	5–0	1–3
Gnistan	1–1	—	2–2	10–1	1–2	2–1	0–2	5–0	1–1	1–0	0–0	0–1
FF Jaro	3–3	0–2	—	3–1	3–0	2–2	2–0	3–0	4–0	4–0	1–1	1–2
JaPS	1–0	2–1	0–0	—	0–0	2–1	1–4	0–1	3–0	4–1	1–1	0–1
KPV	1–1	0–2	1–0	1–0	—	1–3	3–2	2–1	1–1	2–1	0–3	1–1
KTP	1–1	4–0	2–1	3–1	3–0	—	4–1	1–0	4–0	3–1	1–0	0–0
MP	2–2	1–1	3–0	2–0	1–1	3–0	—	2–1	1–2	2–3	1–1	1–1
PEPO	2–2	1–2	0–3	2–4	1–1	0–2	2–1	—	3–3	2–1	1–0	1–1
PK-35	3–1	2–2	0–4	2–2	1–1	0–1	2–0	1–2	—	2–2	2–0	2–1
Pargas IF	2–3	1–0	0–2	0–1	1–2	1–4	2–3	0–2	3–2	—	0–2	0–2
SJK Akatemia	0–3	4–0	1–3	3–4	1–1	1–1	2–1	2–2	4–1	4–0	—	0–2
TPS	2–2	5–0	3–1	3–0	5–0	1–3	1–0	0–0	2–0	0–2	2–1	—

Source: Soccerway
Legend: Blue = home team win; Yellow = draw; Red = away team win.

== Promotion Round ==
The top six from the regular season enter the Promotion Round and play each other for the third time. The winner qualifies directly for promotion to Veikkausliiga, whilst 2nd, 3rd and 4th which are runners-up enter a playoff against the second to last team in the 2022 Veikkausliiga for promotion.

=== League table ===
Pos	Team	Pld	W	D	L	GF	GA	GD	Pts	Promotion or qualification
1	KTP (C, P)	27	17	4	6	60	28	+32	55	Promotion to the Veikkausliiga
2	TPS	27	15	7	5	47	23	+24	52	Qualification for the Veikkausliiga play-off
3	FF Jaro	27	15	5	7	55	29	+26	50	Qualification for the Veikkausliiga play-off
4	EIF	27	10	8	9	46	41	+5	38	Qualification for the Veikkausliiga play-off
5	KPV	27	9	9	9	32	45	−13	36	
6	JaPS	27	10	4	13	37	57	−20	34	

Source: Soccerway
Rules for classification: 1) Points; 2) Goal difference; 3) Goals scored; 4) Head-to-head points; 5) Head-to-head goal difference; 6) Head-to-head away goals scored; 7) Play-off
(Note: Play-off is only played if need to decide champion, teams for relegation or UEFA competition and will be played on a neutral ground).
(C) Champions; (P) Promoted

=== Results ===
Home \ Away	KTP	TPS	JAR	EIF	KPV	JPS
KTP	—	0–1	—	—	6–2	6–0
TPS	—	—	0–1	2–0	2–2	—
FF Jaro	4–2	—	—	2–0	2–1	—
EIF	1–2	—	—	—	—	4–0
KPV	—	—	—	1–2	—	2–1
JaPS	—	4–3	1–3	—	—	—

Source: Soccerway
Legend: Blue = home team win; Yellow = draw; Red = away team win.

== Relegation Round ==
The bottom six from the regular season enter the Relegation Round and play each other for the third time. The bottom three sides are relegated to the Kakkonen.

=== League table ===
Pos	Team	Pld	W	D	L	GF	GA	GD	Pts	Relegation
1	Gnistan	27	11	7	9	45	38	+7	40	
2	MP	27	10	6	11	48	42	+6	36	
3	SJK Akatemia	27	9	8	10	43	40	+3	35	
4	PK-35 (R)	27	8	7	12	36	52	−16	31	Relegation to the Kakkonen
5	PEPO (R)	27	7	6	14	43	40	+3	27	Relegation to the Kakkonen
6	Pargas IF (R)	27	5	1	21	29	61	−32	16	Relegation to the Kakkonen

Source: Soccerway
Rules for classification: 1) Points; 2) Goal difference; 3) Goals scored; 4) Head-to-head points; 5) Head-to-head goal difference; 6) Head-to-head away goals scored; 7) Play-off
(Note: Play-off is only played if need to decide champion, teams for relegation or UEFA competition and will be played on a neutral ground).
(R) Relegated

=== Results ===
Home \ Away	GNS	MIP	PEP	PKK	PIF	SJK
Gnistan	—	2–1	4–2	—	2–1	—
MP	—	—	6–2	1–0	—	1–2
PEPO	—	—	—	4–2	1–3	—
PK-35	1–0	—	—	—	1–0	—
Pargas IF	—	3–4	—	—	—	1–2
SJK Akatemia	2–2	—	3–0	3–4	—	—

Source: Soccerway
Legend: Blue = home team win; Yellow = draw; Red = away team win.
