= Joakim Latonen =

Finnish footballer (born 1998)

Personal information
- Date of birth: 24 February 1998 (age 28)
- Place of birth: Kaarina, Finland
- Height: 1.72 m (5 ft 8 in)
- Position: Midfielder

Team information
- Current team: IF Gnistan
- Number: 10

Youth career
- –2014: KaaPo
- 2015–2017: TPS

Senior career*
Years	Team	Apps	(Gls)
2018–2021	TPS	81	(15)
2018	→ SalPa (loan)	8	(6)
2022	IFK Mariehamn	20	(2)
2023–	Gnistan	122	(43)
- * Club domestic league appearances and goals as of 13 November 2026

Joakim Latonen (born 24 February 1998) is a Finnish professional footballer who plays for Veikkausliiga club Gnistan, as an attacking midfielder.

== Club career ==
=== Early career ===
Latonen started to play football in a youth team of Kaarinan Pojat (KaaPo) in Kaarina.

=== Turun Palloseura ===
Latonen joined the youth sector of Turun Palloseura (TPS) in the neighbouring town of Turku in 2015. He made his senior debut with TPS first team in Veikkausliiga in 2018. During the season, he occasionally represented the associate farm club Salon Palloilijat (SalPa), playing in third-tier Kakkonen.

He spent four seasons with TPS, alternately in Veikkausliiga and second-tier Ykkönen, before his departure was announced in December 2021.

=== IFK Mariehamn ===
For the 2022 season, he signed a one-year contract with IFK Mariehamn in Veikkausliiga.

=== IF Gnistan ===
On 31 January 2023, Latonen signed with IF Gnistan in the second-tier Ykkönen. He was named the Ykkönen Player of the Month in September and October 2023. At the end of the season, Latonen won the Golden Boot as the top scorer in Ykkönen with 19 goals, and Gnistan were promoted to Veikkausliiga via supplemental process. Latonen was also named the Best Player and the Best Forward in Ykkönen.

On 2 January 2024, he renewed his contract with Gnistan, signing a one-year deal for the 2024 season. On 24 February, Latonen scored a hat-trick in a 5–2 Finnish League Cup win against EIF. On 6 April, in the opening match of the 2024 Veikkausliiga season, Latonen scored the first-ever goal for Gnistan in Veikkausliiga, an equalizer from penalty spot against Inter Turku. Gnistan eventually won the game 2–1. One week later on 13 April, Latonen scored his first hat-trick in Veikkausliiga, in a 6–4 away win against Ilves. During the 2024 Veikkausliiga season, Latonen made 29 appearances and scored 11 goals, making it his highest-scoring campaign in Finnish top-tier. On 4 January 2025, Latonen signed a two-year contract extension with Gnistan.

== Career statistics ==
As of 27 July 2026

Appearances and goals by club, season and competition
Club	Season	League			National cup (Note: Includes Suomen Cup)		League cup (Note: Includes Finnish League Cup and Ykkönen Cup)		Europe		Total	
Club	Season	Division	Apps	Goals	Apps	Goals	Apps	Goals	Apps	Goals	Apps	Goals
TPS	2018	Veikkausliiga	11	0	3	0	—		—		14	0
TPS	2019	Ykkönen	25	3	4	1	—		—		29	4
TPS	2020	Veikkausliiga	20	1	7	2	—		—		27	3
TPS	2021	Ykkönen	25	11	3	1	—		—		28	12
TPS	Total		81	15	17	4	0	0	0	0	98	19
TPS U23	2020	Kolmonen	2	0	—		—		—		2	0
SalPa (loan)	2018	Kakkonen	8	6	—		—		—		8	6
IFK Mariehamn	2022	Veikkausliiga	20	2	4	0	3	1	—		27	3
Gnistan	2023	Ykkönen	29	19	1	0	4	1	—		34	20
Gnistan	2024	Veikkausliiga	29	11	2	0	3	3	—		34	14
Gnistan	2025	Veikkausliiga	32	6	2	1	5	2	–		39	9
Gnistan	2026	Veikkausliiga	17	5	0	0	4	1	–		21	6
Gnistan	Total		90	36	5	1	16	7	0	0	128	49
Career total			218	64	26	5	19	8	0	0	263	77

== Honours ==
Turun Palloseura

- Ykkönen runner-up: 2019

IF Gnistan

- Ykkönen runner-up: 2023

Individual

- Ykkönen: Player of the Year 2023
- Ykkönen: Forward of the Year 2023
- Ykkönen Player of the Month: September 2023, October 2023
