= Haymenn Bah-Traoré =

German footballer (born 1997)

Personal information
- Date of birth: 12 June 1997 (age 29)
- Place of birth: Essen, Germany
- Height: 1.77 m (5 ft 10 in)
- Position: Defender

Youth career
- Rot-Weiss Essen

Senior career*
Years	Team	Apps	(Gls)
2016–2017	SG Wattenscheid 09	32	(0)
2017–2022	Borussia Dortmund II	70	(2)
2023–2024	Haka	41	(1)
2025	Kauno Žalgiris	29	(1)
- * Club domestic league appearances and goals as of 21 November 2025

Haymenn Bah-Traoré (born 12 June 1997) is a German professional footballer who plays as a defender.

== Club career ==
Bah-Traoré is a former youth academy player of Rot-Weiss Essen. He started his senior career with SG Wattenscheid 09 in July 2016. He moved to Borussia Dortmund's reserve team following season. He made his professional debut for the team on 13 August 2021 in a 5–2 league win against SC Freiburg II.

After spending six months as a free agent, Bah-Traoré joined Finnish club Haka in December 2022.

In January 2025, he joined Kauno Žalgiris.

== International career ==
In September 2021, Bah-Traoré received his first call-up to the Togo national team for FIFA World Cup qualifying matches against Congo.

== Personal life ==
Born in Germany, Bah-Traoré is of Togolese descent.

== Career statistics ==
As of 2 November 2024

Club	Season	League			Cup (Note: Includes DFB-Pokal and Suomen Cup)		Europe		Other		Total	
Club	Season	Division	Apps	Goals	Apps	Goals	Apps	Goals	Apps	Goals	Apps	Goals
SG Wattenscheid 09	2016–17	Regionalliga West	32	0	2	0	—		1 (Note: Includes Westfalenpokal)	0	35	0
Borussia Dortmund II	2017–18	Regionalliga West	19	1	–		—		—		19	1
Borussia Dortmund II	2018–19	Regionalliga West	8	0	–		—		—		8	0
Borussia Dortmund II	2019–20	Regionalliga West	0	0	–		—		—		0	0
Borussia Dortmund II	2020–21	Regionalliga West	21	0	–		—		—		21	0
Borussia Dortmund II	2021–22	3. Liga	22	1	–		–		—		22	1
Borussia Dortmund II	Total		70	2	–	–	–	–	–	–	70	2
Haka	2023	Veikkausliiga	17	0	1	0	2 (Note: Appearance(s) in UEFA Europa Conference League)	0	3 (Note: Includes Finnish League Cup)	0	23	0
Haka	2024	Veikkausliiga	24	1	1	0	—		5	0	30	1
Haka	Total		41	1	2	0	2	0	8	0	53	1
Kauno Žalgiris	2025	A Lyga	0	0	0	0	—		—		0	0
Career total			143	3	4	0	2	0	8	0	157	3

== Honours ==
Borussia Dortmund II

- Regionalliga West: 2020–21
