= Nícolas Dantas =

Brazilian footballer (born 1998)

Personal information
- Full name: Nícolas Gianini Dantas
- Date of birth: 15 May 1998 (age 28)
- Place of birth: São Bernardo do Campo, Brazil
- Height: 1.88 m (6 ft 2 in)
- Position: Centre back

Team information
- Current team: FC Lahti
- Number: 5

Youth career
- Vila Nova

Senior career*
Years	Team	Apps	(Gls)
2018	Vila Nova	2	(0)
2019–2021	Sao Bernardo	9	(0)
2019–2020	→ Vejle (loan)	9	(2)
2021–2022	Brage	10	(0)
2022	→ Vasalunds IF (loan)	25	(0)
2023	Oskarshamns AIK	26	(0)
2024–2025	Haka	40	(2)
2026–	Lahti	24	(0)
- * Club domestic league appearances and goals as of 13 November 2026

Nícolas Gianini Dantas (born 15 May 1998) is a Brazilian professional footballer who plays as a centre back for Veikkausliiga club FC Lahti.

== Club career ==
After playing in his native Brazil, Denmark and Sweden, Dantas moved to Finland in December 2023 after signing with Veikkausliiga club FC Haka on a two-year deal, starting in the 2024 Veikkausliiga season.

== Personal life ==
Dantas is of Italian descent. He is married and living together with his wife in Finland. As of February 2025, they are expecting their first child.

== Career statistics ==
As of 27 July 2026

Appearances and goals by club, season and competition
Club	Season	Division	League		State league		National cup (Note: Includes Svenska Cupen and Suomen Cup)		League cup (Note: Includes Copa Paulista and Finnish League Cup)		Continental		Total	
Club	Season	Division	Apps	Goals	Apps	Goals	Apps	Goals	Apps	Goals	Apps	Goals	Apps	Goals
Vila Nova	2018	Série B	0	0	2 (Note: Includes Campeonato Goiano)	0	–		–		–		2	0
Sao Bernardo	2019	Campeonato Paulista A2			9	0	–		15	1	–		24	1
Sao Bernardo	2020	Campeonato Paulista A2			0	0	–		3	1	–		3	1
Sao Bernardo	2021	Campeonato Paulista A2			0	0	–		–		–		0	0
Sao Bernardo	Total		–	–	9	0	–	–	18	2	–	–	27	2
Vejle (loan)	2019–20	Danish 1st Division	9	2	–		–		–		–		9	2
Brage	2021	Superettan	10	0	–		1	0	–		–		11	0
Vasalunds IF (loan)	2022	Ettan	25	0	–		1	0	–		–		26	0
Oskarshamns AIK	2023	Ettan	26	0	–		4	0	–		–		30	0
Haka	2024	Veikkausliiga	25	2	–		6	0	4	0	–		35	2
Haka	2025	Veikkausliiga	15	0	–		3	0	4	1	–		22	1
Haka	Total		40	2	0	0	7	0	10	1	0	0	57	3
FC Lahti	2026	Veikkausliiga	14	0	–		3	0	3	0	–		20	0
Career total			125	3	11	0	16	0	31	3	0	0	182	6
