= Stevie Grieve =

Scottish football manager

Personal information
- Full name: Stevie Grieve
- Date of birth: 31 December 1986 (age 39)
- Place of birth: Perth, Scotland

Managerial career
- Years: Team
- 2014–2016: Garhwal FC
- 2016–2019: Burlington SC (academy manager)
- 2019–2021: Dundee United (opponent analyst)
- 2021–2022: St Johnstone (head of scouting)
- 2022–2023: Forest Green (head of scouting)
- 2023: SJK Akatemia
- 2024: SJK (assistant)
- 2024–2025: SJK
- 2026: Helsingborgs IF

Stevie Grieve (born 31 December 1986) is a Scottish football manager. Having never played football professionally, he was described by the BBC Sport as the person who "has a wealth of experience in scouting and analysis."

== Career ==
Grieve played futsal for Perth Saltires in his teenage years. His first taste of coaching came when he teach "a group of inquisitive children how to do tricks like an elastico and a rainbow flick". This caught an attention from the owner, who offered him a job at aged 16. When Grieve was 17, he acknowledge his "talent for coaching". Grieve worked part-time in River Island and a call centre while coaching at the Letham Tangerines youth teams.

During his career, Grieve has coached in United States, India, Scotland, Switzerland and Finland. While in India, he had a weekly TV-program called The Mind Game. This earned him a nickname "Scottish Gary Neville". Grieve then joined Dundee United as an opponent analyst. After spending two years with the Tangerines, he left the Arabs on 1 July 2021.

On 22 July 2021, Grieve joined his boyhood club St Johnstone as their new head of scouting. On 7 April 2022, he left the club, citing his desires to look for "new opportunities".

On 1 November 2022, Grieve joined Forest Green as a new head of scouting. He was instrumental of making 11 signings in the January transfer window. However, on 13 March 2023, Grieve left Forest Green with immediate effect. It was later revealed by local newspaper Gloucestershire Live that travel was the factor of his departure, due to being based in Dundee.

On 19 April 2023, Grieve was appointed as a manager of SJK Akatemia. He managed his first match at the club, winning 2–1 against SalPa two days later. Grieve led SJK Akatemia to the play-offs. As a result, he signed a contract extension with the club. However, he helped SJK Akatemia beat MP 4–1 in the quarter-finals before losing 4–2 against Gnistan. The inclusion of SJK Akatemia led the Finnish Football Federation to change the rules so that reserve teams and cooperation teams can not promote.

On 4 December 2023, Grieve was named the manager of SJK's first team. His appointment was confirmed on 12 January 2024 where he worked alongside Toni Lehtinen. Around the same time, Grieve would be studying for Uefa Pro Licence. Their first match in charge came on 6 April 2024 where he helped the club win 2–1 against AC Oulu. On 28 May 2024, Grieve was confirmed as SJK's head coach. He helped the club seal a place in the league's Championship round. He was named the Veikkausliiga Manager of the Month for April 2025.

On 30 November 2025, Grieve was appointed head coach of Swedish Superettan side Helsingborgs IF on a two-year contract. His previous contract with SJK was amicably terminated. On 28 August 2026, Grieve left his position at Helsingborgs after taking charge of 30 matches.

== Personal life ==
Grieve is married to his wife, Sarah, having been together since they were 17.

== Managerial statistics ==
As of 8 March 2026

Team	Nat	From	To	Record							
Team	Nat	From	To	P	W	D	L	GF	GA	GD	W%
SJK Akatemia	(Finland)	19 April 2023	31 December 2023	29	13	5	11	52	55	−3	44.83
SJK	(Finland)	28 May 2024	30 November 2025	66	30	15	21	140	117	+23	45.45
Helsingborgs IF	(Sweden)	30 November 2025	28 August 2026	3	0	1	2	2	9	−7	0.00
Total				98	43	21	34	194	181	+13	43.88

== Honours ==
Individual

- Veikkausliiga Manager of the Month: April 2025, June 2025
