= Ashley Coffey =

English footballer (born 1993)

Personal information
- Full name: Ashley Mark Coffey
- Date of birth: 1 December 1993 (age 32)
- Place of birth: Leeds, England
- Height: 1.93 m (6 ft 4 in)
- Position: Forward

Team information
- Current team: BG Pathum United
- Number: 19

Youth career
- 2006–2008: Bradford City

Senior career*
Years	Team	Apps	(Gls)
2013–2014	West Auckland Town	14	(3)
2014–2016	Newton Aycliffe		
2016–2018	Marske United		
2018–2019	Whitby Town	12	(2)
2019	Huddinge	11	(12)
2020	Haninge	29	(28)
2021–2022	AFC Eskilstuna	47	(18)
2023–2024	AC Oulu	48	(25)
2025	Shanghai Jiading Huilong	27	(10)
2026	Al-Hussein	11	(2)
2026–	BG Pathum United	0	(0)
- * Club domestic league appearances and goals as of 17:11, 2 February 2026 (UTC)

Ashley Mark Coffey (born 1 December 1993) is an English professional footballer who plays as a forward for Thai League 1 club BG Pathum United. Born in Leeds, Coffey played for various English non-league clubs before turning professional in Sweden and going on to play in Finland, China and Jordan.

== Career ==
=== England ===
Growing up, Coffey spent two years as part of the Bradford City academy before being released at aged 15 after being told that he was "too slow". Following this, Coffey reflected on being released by the Bradford City academy, saying: "I didn't get a contract, so from there, I just thought, 'this is kind of over in terms of professional football, I'll get a qualification at university'". He then attended the Teesside University. While at university, he played for West Auckland Town before joining Newton Aycliffe in October 2014. He later joined Marske United where he spent a year-and-a-half. Following that he had a spell with Northern Premier League side Whitby Town scoring twice in 12 league games.

=== Sweden ===
In 2019 he moved abroad for the first time to join Swedish Division 2 side Huddinge where he scored 12 goals in the second half of the season. The following season, he moved up a division to join Haninge where he finished as the top scorer in the league. In January 2021, he joined Superettan side AFC Eskilstuna on a three-year deal. After two years, he left the club.

=== AC Oulu ===
In January 2023, he joined Finnish Veikkausliiga side AC Oulu on a one-year deal with an option to extend for an additional year. On 5 April 2023, Coffey made his professional league debut starting in a 2–0 win over KTP. Coffey was the top goalscorer of the club in the 2023 season, scoring 19 goals and giving 6 assists in 36 matches in all competitions combined. He was also the third-best goalscorer of the whole league in the 2023 season, after Bojan Radulović and Peter Godly Michael.

On 10 November 2023, the club exercised their option to extend Coffey's contract for the 2024 season. Coffey finished his second season with the club scoring 12 goals as the joint top goalscorer of Veikkausliiga with Jaime Moreno. After the last match of the season, he confirmed he would leave Oulu. He scored a total of 36 goals, making him the second-best goalscorer in AC Oulu's history.

=== Shanghai Jiading Huilong ===
On 30 January 2025, Coffey joined China League One club Shanghai Jiading Huilong.

=== Al-Hussein ===
On 30 January 2026, Coffey joined Jordanian Pro League club Al-Hussein.

== Personal life ==
Before going professional with AFC Eskilstuna, Coffey worked at Internationella Engelska Skolan during his first year-and-a-half in Sweden. Growing up, he was a Leeds United supporter and was both a season ticket holder and a mascot.

== Career statistics ==
As of match played 30 January 2026

Appearances and goals by club, season and competition
Club	Season	League			National cup (Note: Includes Svenska Cupen and Suomen Cup)		League cup (Note: Includes Finnish League Cup)		Continental (Note: Includes AFC Champions League Two)		Total	
Club	Season	Division	Apps	Goals	Apps	Goals	Apps	Goals	Apps	Goals	Apps	Goals
Whitby Town	2018–19	Northern Premier League	12	2	—		—		—		12	2
Huddinge IF	2019	Division 2	11	12	—		—		—		11	12
IFK Haninge	2020	Ettan	29	28	1	0	—		—		30	29
AFC Eskilstuna	2021	Superettan	28	13	2	0	—		—		30	13
AFC Eskilstuna	2022	Superettan	19	5	1	0	—		—		20	5
AFC Eskilstuna	Total		47	18	3	0	0	0	0	0	50	18
AC Oulu	2023	Veikkausliiga	25	13	5	2	6	4	—		36	19
AC Oulu	2024	Veikkausliiga	23	12	2	2	4	3	—		29	17
AC Oulu	Total		48	25	7	4	10	7	0	0	65	36
Shanghai Jiading Huilong	2025	China League One	27	10	0	0	—		—		27	10
Al-Hussein	2025–26	Jordanian Pro League	0	0	0	0	—		0	0	0	0
Career total			174	95	11	4	10	7	0	0	195	106

== Honours ==
AC Oulu

- Finnish League Cup runner-up: 2023

Individual

- Veikkausliiga Forward of the Year: 2024
- Veikkausliiga Golden Boot: 2024
- Veikkausliiga Player of the Month: May 2024
- Ettan Norra Golden Boot: 2020
- AC Oulu Supperters' Player of the Year: 2023, 2024
