= Pasi Tuutti =

Finnish football manager (born 1979)

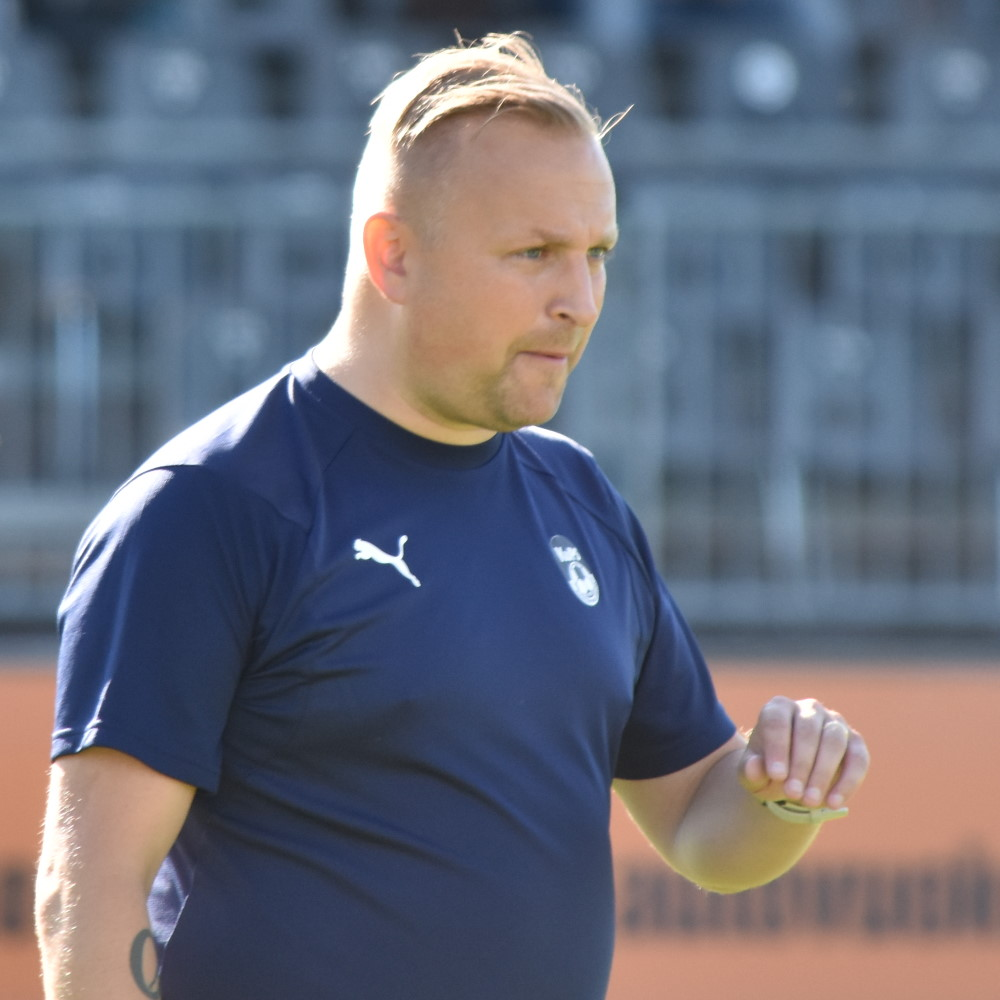
- Tuutti with KuPS in 2020

Personal information
- Full name: Pasi Mikael Tuutti
- Date of birth: 21 March 1979 (age 47)
- Place of birth: Kuopio, Finland
- Height: 1.81 m (5 ft 11 in)
- Position: Midfielder

Team information
- Current team: Ilves (assistant coach)

Youth career
- 1985–1989: Kuopion Elo
- 1990–1998: KuPS

Senior career*
Years	Team	Apps	(Gls)
1998–2001	KuPS	47	(4)
2002	Warkaus JK	19	(5)
2003	Kings Kuopio	19	(10)
2004	KuPS	24	(1)
2005–2008	Kings Kuopio	64	(9)

Managerial career
- 2014–2017: Ilves (youth)
- 2018–2019: RoPS (assistant)
- 2019: RoPS
- 2020–2023: KuPS (assistant)
- 2023: KuPS
- 2023–: Ilves (assistant)
- * Club domestic league appearances and goals as of 4 April 2024

Pasi Mikael Tuutti (born 21 March 1979) is a Finnish football coach and a former player, who played as a midfielder. He is currently working as an assistant coach of Veikkausliiga club Ilves. Tuutti has completed the UEFA Pro -coaching license.

== Career ==
Tuutti was born in Kuopio, and played mostly with local clubs Kuopion Elo, KuPS and Kings Kuopio.

During 2014–2017, he was a youth coach in Ilves organisation. In 2018, he started as an assistant coach of Toni Koskela in Veikkausliiga club RoPS, and after Koskela left to HJK in 2019, Tuutti was named the head coach for the remainder of the season.

In 2020, he returned to his hometown Kuopio and started as an assistant coach of KuPS, where he worked with managers Arne Erlandsen and Simo Valakari. Tuutti was named the first team's head coach for the 2023 Veikkausliiga season, but was sacked after three league matches.

In late July 2023, he was named assistant coach of Ilves in Veikkausliiga.

== Coaching record ==
As of 9 July 2023

Team	Nat	From	To	Record				
Team	Nat	From	To	G	W	D	L	Win %
RoPS	(Finland)	23 May 2019	31 December 2019	20	5	5	10	25.00
KuPS	(Finland)	19 January 2023	20 April 2023	9	2	2	5	22.22
Total				29	7	7	15	24.14
