= Teemu Hytönen =

Finnish footballer (born 2002)

Personal information
- Date of birth: 15 August 2002 (age 24)
- Place of birth: Viiala, Finland
- Height: 1.94 m (6 ft 4 in)
- Position: Forward

Team information
- Current team: Ilves
- Number: 9

Youth career
- Ilves

Senior career*
Years	Team	Apps	(Gls)
2020–2022	Ilves II	42	(12)
2022–2023	VPS II	18	(19)
2022–2024	VPS	33	(7)
2023	→ Närpes Kraft (loan)	8	(2)
2025–	Ilves	50	(20)

International career^{‡}
2024–2025	Finland U21	4	(0)
- * Club domestic league appearances and goals as of 13 November 2026 ‡ National team caps and goals as of 20 June 2025

Teemu Hytönen (born 15 August 2002) is a Finnish professional football player who plays as a forward for Veikkausliiga side Ilves.

== Club career ==
Hytönen started football in the youth sector of Ilves in Tampere. He made his senior debut with the club's reserve team in 2020, in Finnish third-tier Kakkonen.

In August 2022, Hytönen left Ilves and joined Veikkausliiga club Vaasan Palloseura, and eventually made his league debut later in the same year. On 6 April 2024, in the opening game of the 2024 season, Hytönen scored his first goal in Veikkausliiga for VPS, in a 2–1 away win against Haka. In his first full season in the league, he recorded 27 appearances and scored seven goals.

On 30 October, Hytönen signed with Ilves on a two-year deal, starting in 2025, returning to his former club.

== International career ==
Hytönen made his national team debut for Finland U21 in September 2024, as a substitute in a 2–0 home win over Romania. He went on to make one more appearance in the 2025 UEFA European Under-21 Championship qualification, in which Finland qualified for the final tournament, for the second time in the nation's history.

== Career statistics ==
As of 6 June 2025

Appearances and goals by club, season and competition
Club	Season	Division	League		National cup (Note: Includes Suomen Cup)		League cup (Note: Includes Kakkonen Cup and Finnish League Cup)		Europe		Total	
Club	Season	Division	Apps	Goals	Apps	Goals	Apps	Goals	Apps	Goals	Apps	Goals
Ilves II	2020	Kakkonen	3	0	–		2	0	–		5	0
Ilves II	2021	Kakkonen	22	9	–		4	1	–		26	10
Ilves II	2022	Kakkonen	17	3	3	0	–		–		20	3
Ilves II	Total		42	12	2	0	6	1	0	0	50	13
VPS Akatemia	2022	Kolmonen	8	7	–		–		–		8	7
VPS Akatemia	2023	Kolmonen	10	12	–		–		–		10	12
VPS Akatemia	Total		18	19	0	0	0	0	0	0	18	19
VPS	2022	Veikkausliiga	1	0	–		–		–		1	0
VPS	2023	Veikkausliiga	5	0	3	2	5	1	–		13	3
VPS	2024	Veikkausliiga	27	7	1	0	5	0	2 (Note: Includes UEFA Conference League)	0	35	7
VPS	Total		33	7	4	2	10	1	2	0	49	10
Närpes Kraft (loan)	2023	Kakkonen	8	2	–		–		–		8	2
Ilves	2025	Veikkausliiga	8	2	1	0	5	3	0	0	14	5
Career total			109	42	8	2	21	5	2	0	138	49
