= Toni Korkeakunnas =

Finnish footballer and manager (born 1968)

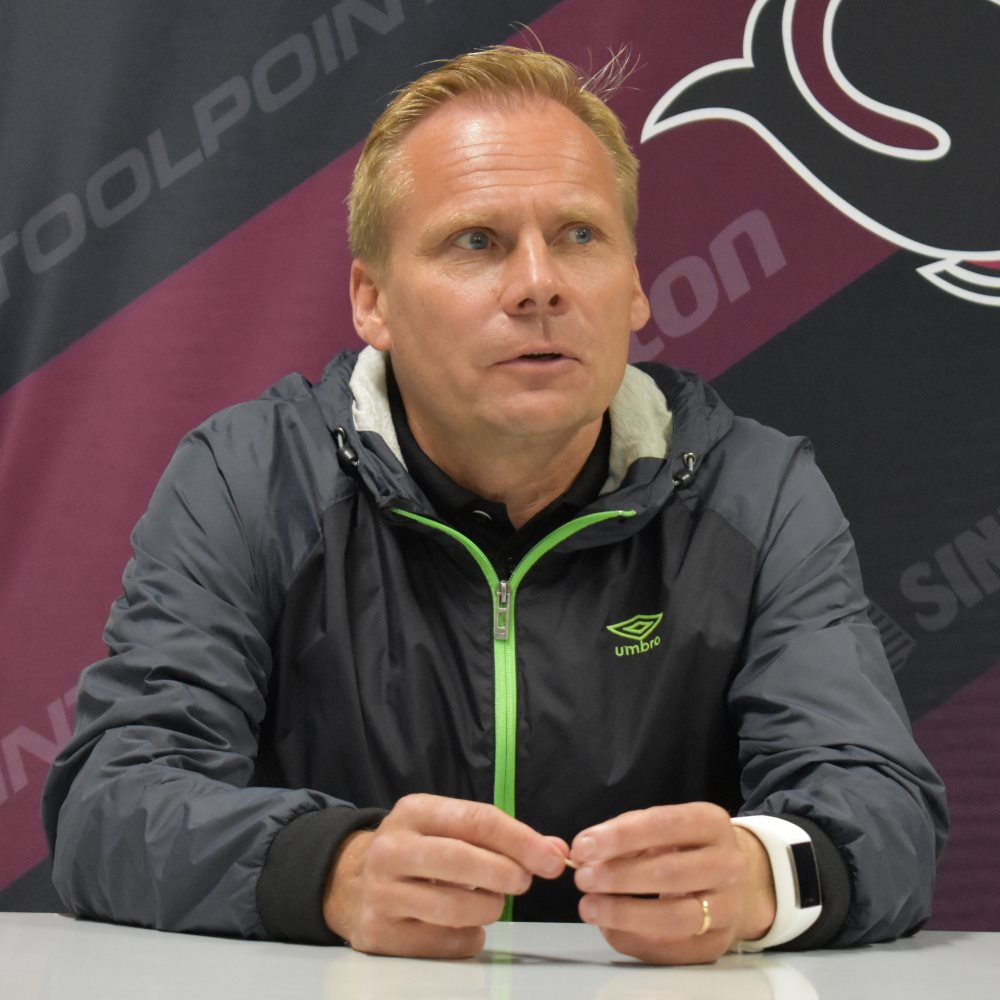
- Korkeakunnas with Lahti in 2017

Personal information
- Date of birth: 15 May 1968 (age 58)
- Place of birth: Helsinki, Finland
- Height: 1.74 m (5 ft 9 in)
- Position: Midfielder

Team information
- Current team: Gnistan (sporting director)

Senior career*
Years	Team	Apps	(Gls)
1987–1993	TP-Seinäjoki	141	(28)
1994	VPS	24	(3)
1995	TP-Seinäjoki	11	(1)
1995	PK-35	8	(2)
1996–1997	HIFK	39	(12)
1998–1999	Gnistan	36	(5)

Managerial career
- 1999–2002: Gnistan
- 2004: Hämeenlinna
- 2007: Gnistan
- 2008–2010: Viikingit
- 2008–2010: Finland U19
- 2011–2013: MYPA
- 2014–2018: Lahti
- 2019–2022: Finland (analyst)
- 2022: HJK (assistant)
- 2023: HJK
- 2023–2024: Finland (assistant)
- 2024–2025: HJK
- 2025–2026: Haugesund
- 2026: Panevėžys
- 2027–: Gnistan (sporting director)
- * Club domestic league appearances and goals

Toni Korkeakunnas (born 15 May 1968) is a Finnish football manager and a former professional player. He was most recently the head coach of Lithuanian club Panevėžys. He would start as sporting director of Veikkausliiga club IF Gnistan in 2027.

== Playing career ==
Korkeakunnas started his senior career with TP-Seinäjoki, where he spent eight years in total. Additionally he played for Vaasan Palloseura (VPS), PK-35, HIFK and Gnistan during his career.

== Managerial career ==
At the club level, Korkeakunnas has managed in Veikkausliiga in FC Hämeenlinna, MYPA and FC Lahti. At the end of his first season with Lahti in 2014, he led the club to finish 3rd in Veikkausliiga, tying their best-record in the league. He has also been a head coach of IF Gnistan in second-tier Ykkönen and third-tier Kakkonen, and FC Viikingit in Ykkönen.

On 23 November 2021, Korkeakunnas signed a contract to join HJK as an assistant coach for the 2022 season.

On 13 July 2023, HJK sacked Toni Koskela following a poor run of form, and appointed Korkeakunnas manager for the rest of the 2023 season. Korkeakunnas also works in Markku Kanerva’s coaching staff in the Finland national football team. Korkeakunnas led HJK to the 2023–24 UEFA Europa Conference League group stage, and won the fourth straight Veikkausliiga title for the club in 2023. In the end of the season, his contract was not extended.

However, after a poor start to the 2024 season, HJK sacked their associate head coach Ferran Sibila and sporting director Vesa Mäki on 20 May 2024, and Korkeakunnas returned again to the club's head coach position, on a deal until the end of 2025. His contract with Finland national team and the Finnish FA was simultaneously terminated. Korkeakunnas managed HJK to qualify for the new UECL league phase in 2024, but couldn't defend the domestic championship as HJK finished third in the league. On 22 April 2025, after a 1–0 home loss against IF Gnistan, Korkeakunnas led HJK to a historical six-game losing streak in the league. He was sacked on 4 May, after a 1–1 draw against Inter Turku.

On 27 May 2025, Korkeakunnas was named the manager of FK Haugesund in Norwegian Eliteserien. The club were sitting at the bottom of the table having gained only one point in nine matches. On 10 August, Korkeakunnas managed Haugesund to win their first match of the season, in a 3–2 home win against Sarpsborg. In March 2026, before the start of the new season, Korkeakunnas was sacked.

In the 2026 season, Korkeakunnas managed Lithuanian top-tier club Panevėžys.

On 11 November 2026, Korkeakunnas was announced as the sporting director of Veikkausliiga club IF Gnistan.

== Personal life ==
Korkeakunnas was born in Helsinki and grew up in Loviisa. He holds a Master of Education degree and has worked as an elementary school teacher.

Korkeakunnas or "Toke", as he is called, has also earned an extra nickname "Tikku" for constantly chewing toothpicks during the match.

== Managerial statistics ==
As of 11 November 2026

Team	Nat	From	To	Record							
Team	Nat	From	To	P	W	D	L	GF	GA	GD	W%
Gnistan	(Finland)	1 January 1999	31 December 2002					–	–	—	
Hämeenlinna	(Finland)	19 May 2004	31 December 2004	24	2	6	16	24	47	−23	8.33
Gnistan	(Finland)	1 January 2007	31 December 2007	27	10	9	8	43	31	+12	37.04
Viikingit	(Finland)	1 January 2008	31 December 2010	73	37	19	17	126	60	+66	50.68
MYPA	(Finland)	1 January 2011	31 December 2013	125	48	23	54	158	164	−6	38.40
Lahti	(Finland)	1 January 2014	1 October 2018	202	73	73	56	262	228	+34	36.14
HJK	(Finland)	14 July 2023	31 December 2023	24	10	4	10	41	41	+0	41.67
HJK	(Finland)	21 May 2024	3 May 2025	43	19	8	16	82	65	+17	44.19
Haugesund	(Norway)	27 May 2025	9 March 2026	22	2	2	18	18	61	−43	9.09
Panevėžys	(Lithuania)	9 April 2026	11 November 2026	31	12	4	15	41	45	−4	38.71
Total				571	213	148	210	795	722	+73	37.30

== Managerial honours ==
HJK

- Veikkausliiga: 2023

FC Lahti

- Finnish League Cup: 2016

Individual

- Veikkausliiga Manager of the Year: 2012
- Veikkausliiga Manager of the Month: July 2011, April 2012, August 2012, August 2013, July 2014, July 2015, July 2017, June 2024
- Finnish Coach of the Month: October 2023
