= Herman Sjögrell =

Swedish footballer

Personal information
- Full name: Herman Hilmer Johannes Sjögrell
- Date of birth: 8 May 2001 (age 25)
- Height: 1.79 m (5 ft 10 in)
- Positions: Winger; midfielder

Team information
- Current team: Inter Turku
- Number: 7

Youth career
- Azalea BK
- –2020: Örgryte IS

Senior career*
Years	Team	Apps	(Gls)
2020–2021	Örgryte IS	23	(1)
2021–2025	IK Sirius	43	(1)
2022	→ Örgryte IS (loan)	16	(1)
2026	Jaro	21	(7)
2026–	Inter Turku	10	(3)
- * Club domestic league appearances and goals as of 12 November 2026

Herman Sjögrell (born 8 May 2001) is a Swedish footballer who plays as a midfielder or right winger for Veikkausliiga club Inter Turku.

His first Allsvenskan goal came as Sirius overturned a 0–2 deficit to 3–2, exclusively in extra time. First, Wessam Abou Ali scored two goals in the 90+1 and 90+5 minute, with Sjögrell recording an assist on the latter. Then, Sjögrell scored the 3–2 goal in the 90+9 minute.

== Honours ==
Inter Turku

- Veikkausliiga: 2026
- Finnish Cup: 2026
