= Erik Gunnarsson =

Swedish footballer (born 1999)

Personal information
- Full name: Hans Erik Gunnarsson
- Date of birth: 8 February 1999 (age 27)
- Place of birth: Sweden
- Height: 1.83 m (6 ft 0 in)
- Position: Centre back

Team information
- Current team: Jaro
- Number: 3

Youth career
- Lerums IS
- IFK Göteborg

Senior career*
Years	Team	Apps	(Gls)
2017–2019	IFK Göteborg	1	(0)
2018–2019	→ Utsiktens BK (loan)	49	(0)
2020–2023	Utsiktens BK	106	(4)
2024	07 Vestur	21	(2)
2025–	Jaro	37	(0)

International career
2015	Sweden U17	2	(0)
2016	Sweden U19	2	(0)
- * Club domestic league appearances and goals as of 13 November 2026

Hans Erik Gunnarsson (born 8 February 1999) is a Swedish professional footballer who plays as a centre back for Veikkausliiga club Jaro.

== Club career ==
After playing for Utsiktens BK on loan from IFK Göteborg in 2018 and 2019, he signed for the club permanently on a two-year deal.

In March 2024, he joined 07 Vestur in Faroe Islands Premier League.

In January 2025, Gunnarsson signed with newly promoted Veikkausliiga club FF Jaro in Finland.

== Career statistics ==
As of 13 November 2026

Appearances and goals by club, season and competition
Club	Season	League			Cup (Note: Includes Svenska Cupen, Faroe Islands Cup and Suomen Cup)		League cup (Note: Includes Finnish League Cup)		Total	
Club	Season	Division	Apps	Goals	Apps	Goals	Apps	Goals	Apps	Goals
IFK Göteborg	2017	Allsvenskan	1	0	2	0	–		3	0
Utsiktens BK (loan)	2018	Swedish Division 1	20	0	0	0	–		20	0
Utsiktens BK (loan)	2019	Swedish Division 1	29	0	2	0	–		31	0
Utsiktens BK (loan)	Total		49	0	2	0	0	0	51	0
Utsiktens BK	2020	Ettan	27	1	5	0	–		32	1
Utsiktens BK	2021	Ettan	25	0	2	0	–		27	0
Utsiktens BK	2022	Superettan	25	0	4	0	–		29	0
Utsiktens BK	2023	Superettan	28	3	1	0	–		29	3
Utsiktens BK	Total		105	4	12	0	0	0	117	4
07 Vestur	2024	Faroe Islands Premier League	21	2	1	0	–		22	2
Jaro	2025	Veikkausliiga	23	0	5	0	3	0	26	0
Jaro	2026	Veikkausliiga	14	0	3	0	2	0	19	0
Jaro	Total		37	0	8	0	5	0	50	0
Career total			213	6	25	0	5	0	243	6
