= Roope Pyyskänen =

Finnish footballer (born 2002)

Personal information
- Full name: Roope Johannes Pyyskänen
- Date of birth: 8 April 2002 (age 24)
- Place of birth: Espoo, Finland
- Height: 1.87 m (6 ft 2 in)
- Position: Attacking midfielder

Team information
- Current team: Honka
- Number: 6

Youth career
- Honka

Senior career*
Years	Team	Apps	(Gls)
2020	Honka	1	(0)
2019–2022	→ Honka II	72	(11)
2023	SalPa	25	(5)
2024	Gnistan	17	(2)
2025–	Honka	45	(20)

International career
2018	Finland U16	3	(1)
- * Club domestic league appearances and goals as of 8 November 2026

Roope Johannes Pyyskänen (born 8 April 2002) is a Finnish professional football player who plays as a midfielder for Honka.

== Club career ==
Pyyskänen debuted in Veikkausliiga with FC Honka first team in the 2020 season.

He signed with Salon Palloilijat (SalPa) in Finnish second-tier Ykkönen for the 2023 season.

On 5 January 2024, Pyyskänen joined newly promoted Veikkausliiga club IF Gnistan on a one-year deal.

== Career statistics ==
As of 23 October 2024.

Appearances and goals by club, season and competition
Club	Season	League			Cup (Note: Includes Suomen Cup)		League cup (Note: Includes Finnish League Cup)		Europe		Total	
Club	Season	Division	Apps	Goals	Apps	Goals	Apps	Goals	Apps	Goals	Apps	Goals
Honka	2020	Veikkausliiga	1	0	0	0	–		–		1	0
Honka Akatemia	2019	Kakkonen	12	0	1	0	–		–		13	0
Honka Akatemia	2020	Kakkonen	15	3	–		–		–		15	3
Honka Akatemia	2021	Kakkonen	21	4	–		–		–		21	4
Honka Akatemia	2022	Kakkonen	24	4	–		–		–		24	4
Honka Akatemia	Total		72	11	1	0	0	0	0	0	73	11
SalPa	2023	Ykkönen	25	5	4	1	4	1	–		33	7
Gnistan	2024	Veikkausliiga	17	2	2	1	4	0	–		23	3
Honka	2025	Kakkonen	0	0	0	0	–		–		0	0
Career total			115	18	7	2	8	1	0	0	130	21
