= Gary Williams (football manager) =

English football manager (born 1977)

Personal information
- Date of birth: 7 December 1977 (age 48)
- Place of birth: Ashford, England

Team information
- Current team: IFK Mariehamn (manager)

Youth career
- Chelsea

College career
Years	Team	Apps	(Gls)
1996–2000	Lindsey Wilson Blue Raiders		

Managerial career
- 2008–2010: HJK women
- 2012–2016: Åland United
- 2021: Finland U23 women
- 2024–: IFK Mariehamn

Gary Williams (born 7 December 1977) is an English professional football manager and former player who is currently the manager of Veikkausliiga club IFK Mariehamn.

== Career ==
Williams has studied in Lindsey Wilson College in the United States and played for school's men's soccer team. Later he coached the women's and men's soccer team between 2004 and 2007.

In August 2008, he was named the head coach of HJK women, leading the team to win the Finnish Women's Cup later in 2008. Previously he had coached the club's girls' youth team. He continued with the first team until the end of the 2009 season.

From 2011 to 2012, Williams worked for the youth sectors of HJK Helsinki and PK-35.

From 2013 to 2016, Williams was the manager of Åland United in the Finnish women's top-tier league, the Naisten Liiga, winning the title in 2013. During 2015–2016, he also worked as an assistant coach of the Finland women's national team.

From April 2017 to December 2021, Williams was the director of coaching and player development for an Åland-based club Jomala IK, continuing with IFK Mariehamn in January 2022 as talent coach and youth sports director.

On 16 August 2024, after the dismissal of Bruno Romão, Williams was named the manager of IFK Mariehamn's first team in the Veikkausliiga, the Finnish men's top-tier league. In November, his contract was extended for the 2025 season.

== Personal life ==
Williams has obtained Finnish citizenship. He is married to a Finnish woman with whom he has two children.

== Honours ==
HJK women

- Finnish Women's Cup: 2008
- Naisten Liiga runner-up: 2008

Åland United

- Naisten Liiga: 2013
- Naisten Liiga runner-up: 2014
