= Jussi Leppälahti =

Finnish football manager (born 1986)

Personal information
- Date of birth: 22 August 1986 (age 40)
- Place of birth: Finland

Team information
- Current team: Gnistan (manager)

Youth career
- 1992–1998: EPS
- 1999–2006: Honka

Senior career*
Years	Team	Apps	(Gls)
2005	Salamat	19	(3)
2006–2008	Espoo	65	(9)
2009–2010	HIFK	43	(14)

Managerial career
- 2015–2016: EPS
- 2019–2021: Jippo
- 2022–2023: KTP
- 2024–: Gnistan
- * Club domestic league appearances and goals as of 12 February 2024

Jussi Leppälahti (born 22 August 1986) is a Finnish football manager and a former player, currently working as a manager of IF Gnistan in Veikkausliiga.

== Playing career ==
Leppälahti played in the youth sectors of Espoon Palloseura (EPS) and FC Honka. Later he played for FCK Salamat, FC Espoo and HIFK, where he met Gert Remmel.

== Coaching career ==
Leppälahti started as a youth coach for FC Espoo, HIFK and FC Honka, and in 2015 was named the head coach of his former youth club Espoon Palloseura (EPS), competing in the fifth-tier Nelonen. At the end of the season, the club gained a promotion to Kolmonen. In 2017 he was a youth coach for Käpylän Pallo (KäPa).

=== Jippo ===
After coaching in the Northampton Town academy between 2017 and 2018, Leppälahti returned to Finland and on 25 September 2018 he was named the head coach of Jippo in the third-tier Kakkonen. The club gained a promotion to Ykkönen for the 2021 season, but was relegated back one year later.

=== KTP ===
Leppälahti was named the head coach of newly relegated Kotkan Työväen Palloilijat (KTP) for the 2022 Ykkönen season, and led the team win the Ykkönen title and earn a promotion back to top-tier Veikkausliiga for the 2023. On 23 August 2023, Leppälahti was unexpectedly dismissed by KTP, after the club had first exercised their option and extended his contract earlier in the summer. Prior to his departure, KTP were 10th in the league standings and had gained 20 points in 20 matches, with five wins and five draws.

=== Gnistan ===
On 10 November 2023, IF Gnistan from Oulunkylä, Northern Helsinki, appointed Leppälahti as their new manager. Later it was announced that Gnistan were granted the league license for 2024 Veikkausliiga season via supplemental process. Leppälahti was named the Veikkausliiga Coach of the Month in August 2024, after leading his team to a four-game unbeaten run in the league during the month, and a five-game winning streak in total. On 30 September, his contract was extended for the 2025.

== Personal life ==
As a teenager, Leppälahti also played basketball for Espoon Honka.

Leppälahti has also worked as a sports journalist in 2010s for Jalkapallolehti, Urheilulehti and Elmo, gaining popularity as a critical writer with controversial and provocative style.

== Managerial statistics ==
As of 27 October 2024

Team	Nat	From	To	Record				
Team	Nat	From	To	P	W	D	L	W%
EPS	(Finland)	1 January 2015	31 December 2016	48	26	8	14	54.17
Jippo	(Finland)	1 January 2019	31 December 2021	82	37	21	24	45.12
KTP	(Finland)	1 January 2022	22 August 2023	64	31	12	21	48.44
Gnistan	(Finland)	1 January 2024	present	36	14	8	14	38.89
Total				230	108	49	73	46.96

== Managerial honours ==
EPS

- Nelonen, Uusimaa Group 1, runner-up: 2015

Jippo

- Kakkonen, Group C: 2020

KTP

- Ykkönen: 2022

Individual

- Veikkausliiga Coach of the Month: August 2024
