= Ferran Sibila =

Spanish football coach

Personal information
- Full name: Ferran Sibila Pont
- Date of birth: 13 July 1988 (age 38)
- Place of birth: Gironella, Spain
- Position: Midfielder

Youth career
- Espanyol
- Fundaciò Ferran Martorell
- Manresa

Senior career*
Years	Team	Apps	(Gls)
2007–2017	Atlètic Gironella		

Managerial career
- 2020: IFK Göteborg (caretaker)
- 2024: HJK Helsinki (associate)
- 2024–2025: IFK Värnamo
- * Club domestic league appearances and goals

Ferran Sibila Pont (born 13 July 1988) is a Spanish football coach.

== Coaching career ==
Sibila was an assistant coach of GIF Sundsvall in Allsvenskan during 2017–2018.

On 3 September 2020, after the then head coach Poya Asbaghi was sacked, Sibila was appointed caretaker head coach of Allsvenskan club IFK Göteborg. after being an assistant since 2019.

During the 2021–22 season, Sibila worked as an assistant coach of EFL Championship club Barnsley.

On 23 August 2022 he was hired as a development coach by Malmö FF, with a special focus on players who were out on loan.

In the early November 2023, it was announced that Sibila will become the new manager of Finnish champions HJK Helsinki on a two-year deal, starting in 2024. Later in January 2024, the club announced that due to his lack of the required UEFA Pro -coaching license, Sibila is not eligible to work as a manager in Veikkausliiga, and was named the associate coach of HJK with interim manager Ossi Virta, until he is able to attend the required coaching training class. Sibila was fired from HJK on 20 May 2024.

On 29 May 2024, it was announced that Sibila would start the UEFA Pro -training, organized by Scottish FA.

He was named the head coach of Swedish Allsvenskan club IFK Värnamo on 23 August 2024. He was sacked on 28 April 2025.
