= Bruno Romão =

Portuguese football manager (born 1984)

Personal information
- Full name: Bruno Alexandre Rodrigues Romão
- Date of birth: 7 January 1984 (age 42)
- Place of birth: Lisbon, Portugal

Managerial career
- Years: Team
- 2005–2006: Oriental U13
- 2006–2007: Casa Pia (assistant)
- 2007–2009: Oriental (assistant)
- 2007–2009: Oriental U15
- 2009–2012: Sporting CP U15 (assistant/GK coach)
- 2009–2012: Sporting CP U19 (assistant/GK coach)
- 2012–2013: Al Hilal U20
- 2013–2014: Portugal (assistant)
- 2014–2016: Cape Verde (assistant)
- 2016: Olhanense (assistant)
- 2017–2018: Pharco (assistant)
- 2020–2022: Busan IPark (assistant)
- 2022–2023: Pharco
- 2024: Mariehamn
- 2025–2026: Universitatea Craiova (assistant)

Bruno Alexandre Rodrigues Romão (born 7 January 1984) is a Portuguese professional football manager.

== Life ==
Romão grew up in Lisbon, Portugal.

He worked as assistant coach of South Korean side Busan IPark.

He obtained a UEFA Pro License.

In 2023, Romão was the head coach of Pharco in Egyptian Premier League.

On 20 December 2023, he was announced as the new manager of Veikkausliiga club IFK Mariehamn in Finland, starting in 2024 season.
