= Jaime Moreno (footballer, born 1995) =

Nicaraguan footballer

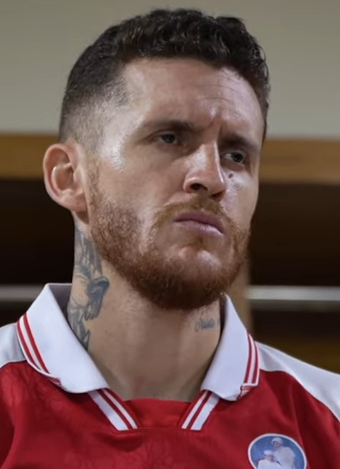
- Moreno in 2025

Personal information
- Full name: Jaime José Moreno Ciorciari
- Date of birth: 30 March 1995 (age 31)
- Place of birth: Puerto la Cruz, Venezuela
- Height: 1.83 m (6 ft 0 in)
- Position: Forward

Team information
- Current team: KuPS
- Number: 11

Youth career
- Deportivo Anzoátegui

Senior career*
Years	Team	Apps	(Gls)
2012–2015	Deportivo Anzoátegui	37	(10)
2014	→ AEL Limassol (loan)	0	(0)
2015–2018	Málaga B	69	(36)
2015	→ El Palo (loan)	9	(2)
2016	→ Cultural Leonesa (loan)	13	(2)
2017	→ Lorca (loan)	7	(1)
2018	Internacional Madrid	8	(2)
2019	Deportivo Lara	8	(3)
2019	Real Estelí	12	(1)
2020	Estudiantes de Mérida	5	(1)
2021–2022	Diriangén	53	(30)
2022	Sol de América	11	(1)
2023–2024	SJK	53	(23)
2025	Barito Putera	24	(9)
2026	Carabobo	5	(0)
2026–	KuPS	27	(12)

International career^{‡}
2013	Venezuela U17		
2015	Venezuela U20	3	(1)
2016–	Nicaragua	53	(17)
- * Club domestic league appearances and goals as of 12 November 2026 ‡ National team caps and goals as of 4 October 2026

Jaime José Moreno Ciorciari (born 30 March 1995) is a professional footballer who plays as a forward for Veikkausliiga club KuPS. Born in Venezuela, he plays for the Nicaragua national team.

== Club career ==
Born in Puerto la Cruz from a Nicaraguan father and an Italian-Venezuelan mother, Moreno graduated with Deportivo Anzoátegui's youth setup. He played his first match as a professional on 21 October 2012, coming on as a late substitute in a 2–0 home win against Deportivo Petare for the Primera División championship.

Moreno scored his first goal on 28 April 2013, netting his side's last in a 3–2 home success over Mineros de Guayana. Despite being only a backup in 2012–13, he was an undisputed starter in 2013–14, appearing in 29 matches and scoring nine goals.

On 17 June 2014, Moreno was loaned to Cyprus First Division's AEL Limassol, in a season-long deal. He made no appearances for the side, and eventually returned to DANZ in December.

On 27 January 2015, Moreno signed a three-year deal with Málaga CF, being assigned to the reserves in Tercera División. On 13 February he was loaned to Segunda División B's CD El Palo, until June.

On 24 August 2018, after loans at Cultural y Deportiva Leonesa and Lorca FC, Moreno signed a permanent contract with Internacional de Madrid in the third division.

On 2 January 2023, Moreno joined Veikkausliiga club SJK ahead of the 2023 season. On 24 August 2023, Moreno extended his contract with SJK, signing a new two-year deal until the end of 2025. Moreno was named the Veikkausliiga Player of the Month in June 2024. In the 2024 season, Moreno scored 12 goals and was the joint top scorer in Veikkausliiga with Ashley Coffey.

In January 2025, he signed with Barito Putera in Liga 1 Indonesia.

== International career ==
A former youth international for Venezuela, Moreno has represented Nicaragua national football team since 2016.

== Personal life ==
Moreno is married and a father. Their first child was born in October 2024, in Seinäjoki, Finland.

== Career statistics ==
=== Club ===
As of 23 March 2026

Appearances and goals by club, season and competition
Club	Season	League			National cup (Note: Includes Copa del Rey and Suomen Cup)		Continental		Other		Total	
Club	Season	Division	Apps	Goals	Apps	Goals	Apps	Goals	Apps	Goals	Apps	Goals
Deportivo Anzoátegui	2012–13	Venezuelan Primera División	8	1	0	0	0	0	–		8	1
Deportivo Anzoátegui	2013–14	Venezuelan Primera División	29	9	0	0	5 (Note: Includes Copa Libertadores)	0	–		34	9
Deportivo Anzoátegui	Total		37	10	0	0	5	0	0	0	42	10
AEL Limassol (loan)	2014–15	Cypriot First Division	0	0	0	0	–		–		0	0
Málaga B	2014–15	Tercera División	0	0	0	0	–		–		0	0
Málaga B	2015–16	Tercera División	32	23	0	0	–		–		32	23
Málaga B	2016–17	Tercera División	0	0	0	0	–		–		0	0
Málaga B	2017–18	Tercera División	37	13	0	0	–		–		37	13
Málaga B	Total		69	36	0	0	0	0	0	0	69	36
El Palo (loan)	2014–15	Segunda División B	9	2	–		–		–		9	2
Cultural Leonesa (loan)	2016–17	Segunda División B	16	4	3	2	–		–		19	6
Lorca (loan)	2016–17	Segunda División B	8	1	–		–		–		8	1
Internacional Madrid	2018–19	Segunda División B	8	2	–		–		–		8	2
Deportivo Lara	2019	Venezuelan Primera División	8	3	0	0	6 (Note: Includes Copa Libertadores and Copa Sudamericana)	0	–		14	3
Real Estelí	2019–20	Liga Primera de Nicaragua	12	1	–		2 (Note: Includes CONCACAF League)	0	–		14	1
Estudiantes de Mérida	2020	Venezuelan Primera División	5	1	–		2	0	–		7	1
Diriangén	2020–21	Liga Primera de Nicaragua	16	5	–		–		–		16	5
Diriangén	2021–22	Liga Primera de Nicaragua	37	25	–		1	0	–		38	25
Diriangén	Total		53	30	0	0	1	0	0	0	54	30
Sol de América	2022	Paraguayan Primera División	11	1	–		–		–		11	1
SJK	2023	Veikkausliiga	26	11	1	0	–		5 (Note: Includes Finnish League Cup)	1	32	12
SJK	2024	Veikkausliiga	27	12	4	6	–		5	4	36	22
SJK	Total		53	23	5	6	0	0	10	5	68	34
Barito Putera	2024–25	Liga 1 Indonesia	16	5	0	0	–		0	0	16	5
Barito Putera	2025–26	Liga 2 Indonesia	8	4	0	0	–		0	0	8	4
Barito Putera	Total		24	9	0	0	0	0	0	0	24	9
Carabobo	2026	Liga FUTVE	5	0	0	0	4	0	–		5	0
KuPS	2026	Veikkausliiga	0	0	0	0	0	0	0	0	0	0
Career total			317	123	8	8	20	0	10	5	355	136

=== International ===
Appearances and goals by national team and year
National team	Year	Apps	Goals
Nicaragua	2016	1	0
Nicaragua	2017	4	0
Nicaragua	2018	5	4
Nicaragua	2019	6	0
Nicaragua	2020	0	0
Nicaragua	2021	4	0
Nicaragua	2022	8	4
Nicaragua	2023	8	2
Nicaragua	2024	6	3
Nicaragua	2025	8	2
Nicaragua	2026	3	1
Total		53	17

Scores and results list Nicaragua's goal tally first, score column indicates score after each Moreno goal.

List of international goals scored by Jaime Moreno
No.	Date	Venue	Opponent	Score	Result	Competition
1	22 March 2018	Nicaragua National Football Stadium, Managua, Nicaragua	Cuba	2–1	3–1	Friendly
2	25 March 2018	Nicaragua National Football Stadium, Managua, Nicaragua	Cuba	3–1	3–3	Friendly
3	14 October 2018	Estadio Eladio Rosabal Cordero, Heredia, Costa Rica	Anguilla	1–0	6–0	2019–20 CONCACAF Nations League qualifying
4	14 October 2018	Estadio Eladio Rosabal Cordero, Heredia, Costa Rica	Anguilla	5–0	6–0	2019–20 CONCACAF Nations League qualifying
5	10 June 2022	Thomas Robinson Stadium, Nassau, Bahamas	Bahamas	1–0	2–0	2022–23 CONCACAF Nations League B
6	13 June 2022	Nicaragua National Football Stadium, Managua, Nicaragua	Bahamas	2–0	4–0	2022–23 CONCACAF Nations League B
7	13 June 2022	Nicaragua National Football Stadium, Managua, Nicaragua	Bahamas	3–0	4–0	2022–23 CONCACAF Nations League B
8	19 November 2022	Dignity Health Sports Park, Carson, United States	Guatemala	1–3	1–3	Friendly
9	11 September 2023	Nicaragua National Football Stadium, Managua, Nicaragua	Barbados	3–0	5–1	2023–24 CONCACAF Nations League B
10	11 September 2023	Nicaragua National Football Stadium, Managua, Nicaragua	Barbados	5–0	5–1	2023–24 CONCACAF Nations League B
11	5 June 2024	Nicaragua National Football Stadium, Managua, Nicaragua	Montserrat	1–0	4–1	2026 FIFA World Cup qualification
12	8 June 2024	FFB Stadium, Belmopan, Belize	Belize	4–0	4–0	2026 FIFA World Cup qualification
13	14 October 2024	Nicaragua National Football Stadium, Managua, Nicaragua	French Guiana	1–1	3–2	2024–25 CONCACAF Nations League A
14	6 June 2025	Nicaragua National Football Stadium, Managua, Nicaragua	Guyana	1–0	1–0	2026 FIFA World Cup qualification
15	13 November 2025	Nicaragua National Football Stadium, Managua, Nicaragua	Honduras	2–0	2–0	2026 FIFA World Cup qualification
16	27 September 2026	Ergilio Hato Stadium, Willemstad, Curacao	Curaçao	1–5	1–6	2026–27 CONCACAF Nations League A
17	4 October 2026	Nicaragua National Football Stadium, Managua, Nicaragua	Dominican Republic	1–0	1–2	2026–27 CONCACAF Nations League A

== Honours ==
Real Estelí

- Liga Primera de Nicaragua: 2019–20

Diriangén

- Liga Primera de Nicaragua: 2020–21, 2021–22

Individual

- Veikkausliiga Top scorer: 2024
- Veikkausliiga Team of the Year: 2024
- Veikkausliiga Player of the Month: June 2024
