= Joni Lehtonen =

Finnish football manager (born 1973)

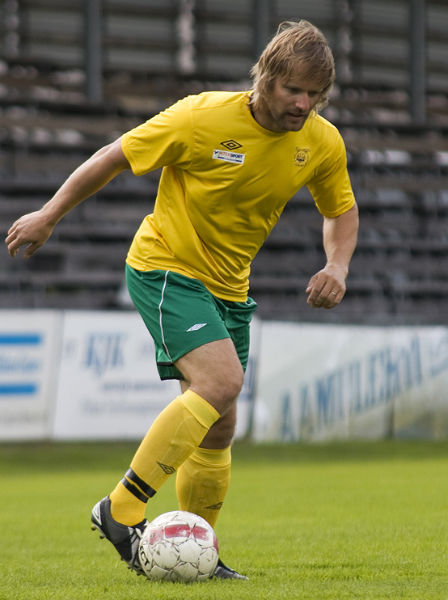
- Lehtonen in a charity match in 2010

Personal information
- Date of birth: 30 September 1973 (age 53)
- Place of birth: Tampere, Finland
- Height: 1.75 m (5 ft 9 in)
- Position: Midfielder

Team information
- Current team: VPS (assistant coach)

Youth career
- Ilves

Senior career*
Years	Team	Apps	(Gls)
1992–1996	Ilves	88	(10)
1996–1997	Motherwell	6	(0)
1997–1998	Ilves	28	(4)
1998	RoPS	17	(0)
1999	Tampere United	12	(1)
2000–2001	TPV	53	(12)
2002–2003	PP-70	45	(4)
2004	FJK	19	(1)
2005	PP-70	25	(4)
2006	Someron Voima	12	(0)
2006–2009	PP-70	64	(3)

Managerial career
- 2017–2018: Ilves (youth)
- 2019–2021: Ilves II (assistant)
- 2021–2023: Ilves (assistant)
- 2023: Ilves
- 2024–2025: Ilves (assistant)
- 2026: Ilves
- 2026–: VPS (assistant)
- * Club domestic league appearances and goals as of 4 April 2024

Joni Lehtonen (born 30 September 1973) is a Finnish football coach and a former player, who played as a midfielder. He would start as assistant coach of Veikkausliiga club VPS in late 2026.

After the dismissal of Toni Kallio in August 2023, Lehtonen was named the head coach of Ilves for the rest of the season, guiding the club to win the 2023 Finnish Cup title.

== Personal life ==
His son Rasmus Lehtonen is also a footballer, playing for Ykkösliiga club Mikkelin Palloilijat (MP).

== Honours ==
As a manager

=== Ilves ===
- Finnish Cup: 2023
