= 2023 Veikkausliiga =

Veikkausliiga
- Season: 2023
- Dates: 5 April – 5 November
- Champions: HJK
- Relegated: Honka; KTP
- Champions League: HJK
- Conference League: Ilves (via Finnish Cup); KuPS; VPS
- Matches: 132
- Goals: 329 (2.49 per match)
- Top goalscorer: Bojan Radulović (18 goals)
- Biggest home win: HJK 4–0 VPS (19 April 2023)
- Biggest away win: Oulu 0–3 SJK (29 April 2023); SJK 1–4 Oulu (27 June 2023)
- Highest scoring: Lahti 3–4 KuPS (1 July 2023)
- Longest winning run: 10 matches VPS
- Longest unbeaten run: 11 matches SJK
- Longest winless run: 11 matches Haka, Lahti
- Longest losing run: 5 matches VPS
- All statistics correct as of 9 October 2023.

The 2023 Veikkausliiga was the 93rd season of top-tier football in Finland, which takes place from April to November.

The winners (HJK, their fourth successive title win and thirty-third overall) qualified for the Champions League first qualifying round. The 2023 Finnish Cup winners (Ilves) qualified for the Conference League second qualifying round. The second-placed team (KuPS) and Conference League play-off winners (VPS) qualified for the Conference League first qualifying round. The eleventh-placed team (Mariehamn) qualified for the Veikkausliiga play-off, winning to retain their place in the league. The bottom-placed team (KTP) were relegated to the 2024 Ykkösliiga. The fifth-placed team (Honka) were demoted to the 2024 Kakkonen due to financial issues.

== Teams ==
The league consisted of twelve teams; the top eleven teams from the previous season, and one team promoted from the Ykkönen. After 22 games, the season split into a championship/relegation round.

HJK were the defending champions. HJK drew an average home attendance of 5,631 in the 2023 Veikkausliiga, the highest in the league. Veikkaus was the league’s sponsor.

Promoted from 2022 Ykkönen	Relegated to 2023 Ykkönen
KTP	HIFK

=== Stadia and locations ===
Location of teams in 2023 Veikkausliiga

Club	Location	Stadium	Turf	Capacity
AC Oulu	Oulu	Raatti Stadion	Natural	5,000
FC Haka	Valkeakoski	Tehtaan kenttä	Artificial	3,516
FC Honka	Espoo	Tapiolan Urheilupuisto	Natural	6,000
FC Inter	Turku	Veritas Stadion	Natural	9,372
FC Lahti	Lahti	Lahden Stadion	Natural	7,465
HJK	Helsinki	Bolt Arena	Artificial	10,770
IFK Mariehamn	Mariehamn	Wiklöf Holding Arena	Artificial	1,650
Ilves	Tampere	Tampere Stadium	Natural	16,800
KTP	Kotka	Arto Tolsa Areena	Artificial	4,780
KuPS	Kuopio	Savon Sanomat Areena	Artificial	2,700
SJK	Seinäjoki	OmaSP Stadion	Artificial	5,817
VPS	Vaasa	Hietalahti	Artificial	6,005

== Regular season ==
=== League table ===
Pos	Team	Pld	W	D	L	GF	GA	GD	Pts	Qualification
1	HJK	22	12	8	2	39	19	+20	44	Qualification for the Championship Round
2	KuPS	22	13	4	5	34	15	+19	43	Qualification for the Championship Round
3	SJK	22	11	5	6	29	24	+5	38	Qualification for the Championship Round
4	VPS	22	11	3	8	30	23	+7	36	Qualification for the Championship Round
5	Honka	22	10	5	7	23	17	+6	35	Qualification for the Championship Round
6	Inter Turku	22	10	4	8	33	31	+2	34	Qualification for the Championship Round
7	Oulu	22	9	4	9	32	37	−5	31	Qualification for the Relegation Round
8	Haka	22	5	9	8	27	37	−10	24	Qualification for the Relegation Round
9	Lahti	22	5	7	10	21	32	−11	22	Qualification for the Relegation Round
10	Ilves	22	4	8	10	20	27	−7	20	Qualification for the Relegation Round
11	KTP	22	5	5	12	20	33	−13	20	Qualification for the Relegation Round
12	Mariehamn	22	3	6	13	21	34	−13	15	Qualification for the Relegation Round

Source: Flashscore
Rules for classification: 1) Points; 2) Goal difference; 3) Goals scored; 4) Head-to-head points; 5) Head-to-head goal difference; 6) Head-to-head away goals scored; 7) Play-off
(Note: Play-off is only played if need to decide champion, teams for relegation or UEFA competition and will be played on a neutral ground).

=== Results ===
Home \ Away	HAK	HJK	HON	ILV	INT	KTP	KPS	LAH	MAR	OUL	SJK	VPS
Haka	—	1–1	1–1	1–1	2–2	4–2	2–2	1–1	1–1	2–2	1–0	2–2
HJK	2–0	—	2–0	1–0	4–1	1–0	2–2	0–1	4–2	1–1	0–0	4–0
Honka	0–2	1–1	—	2–0	1–0	0–1	0–1	3–0	2–1	4–1	0–0	1–0
Ilves	1–2	1–1	1–1	—	2–1	1–0	0–3	2–2	0–0	1–2	1–1	0–2
Inter Turku	3–0	1–3	2–0	2–1	—	2–1	1–1	2–1	1–1	2–1	1–2	0–2
KTP	1–2	3–3	1–2	0–0	1–4	—	0–0	2–0	2–1	0–2	0–2	1–0
KuPS	3–0	2–1	0–1	1–0	1–2	2–0	—	2–0	0–1	1–0	3–0	0–1
Lahti	1–0	1–2	1–0	3–2	1–2	0–0	3–4	—	0–2	1–2	1–1	0–2
Mariehamn	2–1	0–0	0–1	1–1	0–2	0–0	0–2	2–3	—	1–2	0–2	1–2
Oulu	3–0	1–3	1–3	0–3	1–1	3–1	0–2	1–1	3–2	—	0–3	2–1
SJK	2–1	1–2	1–0	1–0	2–1	2–3	1–0	0–0	3–2	1–4	—	2–1
VPS	4–1	0–1	0–0	0–2	3–0	2–1	0–2	0–0	2–1	3–0	3–2	—

Source: Flashscore
Legend: Blue = home team win; Yellow = draw; Red = away team win.

== Championship Round ==
=== League table ===
Pos	Team	Pld	W	D	L	GF	GA	GD	Pts	Qualification
1	HJK (C)	27	15	8	4	50	26	+24	53	Qualification for the Champions League first qualifying round
2	KuPS	27	16	5	6	41	20	+21	53	Qualification for the Conference League first qualifying round
3	VPS (O)	27	15	4	8	41	26	+15	49	Qualification for the Conference League first qualifying round play-off final
4	SJK	27	12	6	9	35	33	+2	42	Qualification for the Conference League first qualifying round play-off quarter-finals
5	Honka (R)	27	12	5	10	29	27	+2	41	Relegation to the 2024 Kakkonen and qualification for the Conference League first qualifying round play-off quarter-finals (Note: Honka were relegated to 2024 Kakkonen after the end of the season due to financial issues.)
6	Inter Turku	27	10	5	12	35	40	−5	35	Qualification for the Conference League first qualifying round play-off quarter-finals

Source: Flashscore
Rules for classification: 1) Points; 2) Goal difference; 3) Goals scored; 4) Head-to-head points; 5) Head-to-head goal difference; 6) Head-to-head away goals scored; 7) Play-off
(Note: Play-off is only played if need to decide champion, teams for relegation or UEFA competition and will be played on a neutral ground).
(C) Champions; (O) Play-off winners; (R) Relegated

=== Results ===
Home \ Away	HJK	HON	INT	KPS	SJK	VPS
HJK	—	3–0	2–0	1–2	—	—
Honka	—	—	3–0	—	—	0–3
Inter Turku	—	—	—	0–1	1–2	—
KuPS	—	3–1	—	—	1–1	0–2
SJK	2–3	1–2	—	—	—	0–2
VPS	3–2	—	1–1	—	—	—

Legend: Blue = home team win; Yellow = draw; Red = away team win.

== Relegation Round ==
=== League table ===
Pos	Team	Pld	W	D	L	GF	GA	GD	Pts	Qualification or relegation
1	Oulu	27	11	5	11	41	45	−4	38	Qualification for the Conference League first qualifying round play-off quarter-finals
2	Ilves	27	8	9	10	35	33	+2	33	Qualification for the Conference League second qualifying round (Note: Ilves qualified for the Conference League second qualifying round by winning the 2023 Finnish Cup.)
3	Haka	27	7	11	9	35	42	−7	32	
4	Lahti	27	7	8	12	26	41	−15	29	
5	Mariehamn (O)	27	5	7	15	28	40	−12	22	Qualification for the Veikkausliiga play-off final
6	KTP (R)	27	5	5	17	21	44	−23	20	Relegation to the Ykkösliiga

Source: Flashscore
Rules for classification: 1) Points; 2) Goal difference; 3) Goals scored; 4) Head-to-head points; 5) Head-to-head goal difference; 6) Head-to-head away goals scored; 7) Play-off
(Note: Play-off is only played if need to decide champion, teams for relegation or UEFA competition and will be played on a neutral ground).
(O) Play-off winners; (R) Relegated

=== Results ===
Home \ Away	HAK	ILV	KTP	LAH	MAR	OUL
Haka	—	2–2	2–0	2–0	—	—
Ilves	—	—	—	—	2–1	3–2
KTP	—	0–3	—	—	0–2	—
Lahti	—	1–5	2–1	—	—	2–1
Mariehamn	2–1	—	—	0–0	—	—
Oulu	1–1	—	2–0	—	3–2	—

Legend: Blue = home team win; Yellow = draw; Red = away team win.

== Play-offs ==
=== Conference League play-off ===
Teams placed 3rd-7th (Honka, Inter Turku, Oulu, SJK, and VPS) entered play-off matches for the second spot in the Conference League first qualifying round. The third-placed team (VPS) received a bye to the final. The quarter-finals and semi-finals are held over one leg (with the higher-placed team gaining home advantage), while the final is held over two legs.

==== Quarter-finals ====
25 October 2023	Honka (5th)	0–0 (a.e.t.) (4–2 p)	Inter Turku (6th)	Tapiolan urheilupuisto, Espoo
16:00 BST

25 October 2023	SJK (4th)	2–2 (a.e.t.) (4–5 p)	Oulu (7th)	OmaSP Stadion, Seinäjoki
16:00 BST

==== Semi-finals ====
28 October 2023	Honka (5th)	5–0	Oulu (7th)	Tapiolan urheilupuisto, Espoo
15:00 BST

==== First leg ====
1 November 2023	Honka (5th)	0–1	VPS (3rd)	Tapiolan urheilupuisto, Espoo
16:00 BST

==== Second leg ====
5 November 2023	VPS (3rd)	1–0 (2–0 agg.)	Honka (5th)	Hietalahti Stadium, Vaasa
14:00 BST

=== Veikkausliiga play-off ===
The eleventh-placed team (Mariehamn) qualified for a play-off alongside the second, third, and fourth-placed teams from the 2023 Ykkönen (Gnistan, MP, and SJK Akatemia). The third and fourth-placed Ykkönen teams entered the quarter-finals, with the winners facing the second-placed Ykkönen team in the semi-finals. The semi-final winners then face the eleventh-placed Veikkausliiga team, with the winners securing the final place in the 2024 Veikkausliiga. For the quarter and semi-finals, the higher-placed team gained home advantage.

==== Quarter-finals ====
14 October 2023	MP (3rd, Ykkönen)	1–4	SJK Akatemia (4th, Ykkönen)	Mikkelin Urheilupuisto, Mikkeli
13:00 BST

==== Semi-finals ====
21 October 2023	Gnistan (2nd, Ykkönen)	4–2 (a.e.t.)	SJK Akatemia (4th, Ykkönen)	Mustapekka Areena, Helsinki
16:00 BST

==== Final ====
===== First leg =====
25 October 2023	Gnistan (2nd, Ykkönen)	0–0	Mariehamn (11th, Veikkausliiga)	Mustapekka Areena, Helsinki
16:30 BST

===== Second leg =====
29 October 2023	Mariehamn (11th, Veikkausliiga)	3–0 (3–0 agg.)	Gnistan (2nd, Ykkönen)	Wiklöf Holding Arena, Mariehamn
13:00 BST

== Top scorers ==
As of 1 November 2023

Rank	Player	Club	Goals
1	(Serbia) Bojan Radulović	HJK	18
2	(Nigeria) Peter Godly Michael	VPS	17
3	(England) Ashley Coffey	Oulu	13
4	(Nicaragua) Jaime Moreno	SJK	11
5	(Argentina) Juan Lescano	Haka	9
6	(South Africa) Darren Smith	Inter Turku	8
6	(Finland) Santeri Haarala	Ilves	8
6	(Finland) Rasmus Karjalainen	Oulu	8
9	(Finland) Jeremiah Streng	SJK	7
9	(Finland) Elias Mastokangas	Haka	7
9	(Finland) Tuomas Ollila	HJK	7
9	(Finland) Niklas Jokelainen	Oulu	7

== Attendances ==
No.	Club	Average	Highest
1	HJK	5,631	10,121
2	SJK	3,069	5,016
3	Inter Turku	3,024	5,012
4	KuPS	2,816	5,423
5	VPS	2,678	4,626
6	KTP	2,550	3,332
7	Haka	2,541	3,347
8	Ilves	2,534	6,588
9	Honka	2,183	3,443
10	Lahti	2,175	2,890
11	Oulu	1,942	3,312
12	Mariehamn	1,173	1,571
