= Stadin derby =

Fixture between HIFK Fotboll and HJK Helsinki

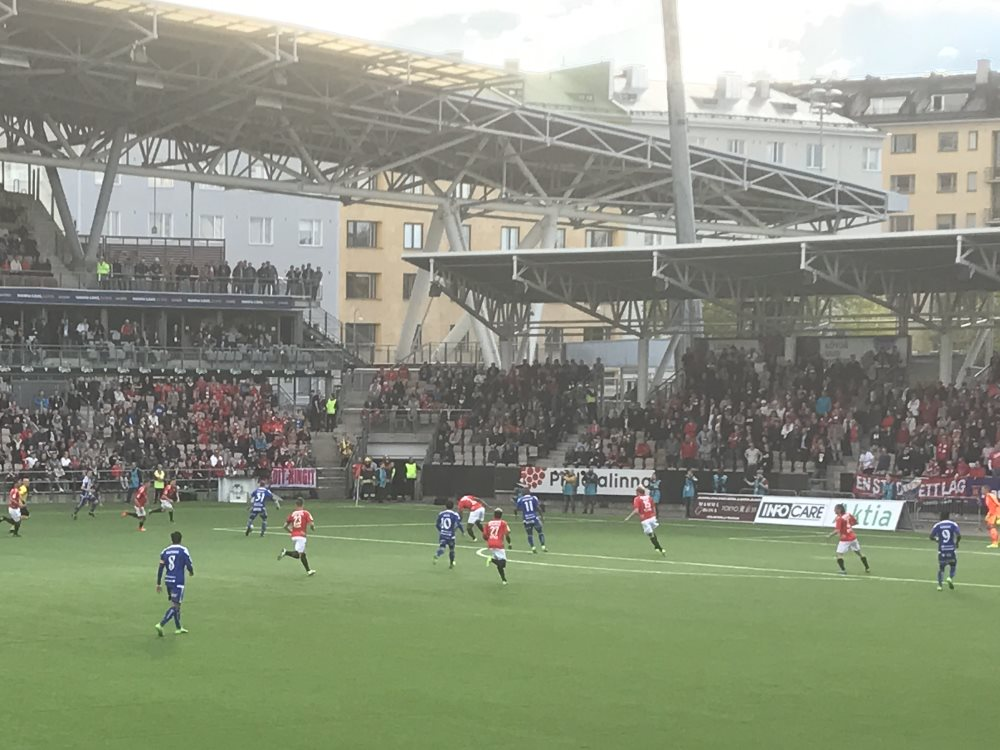
- HIFK–HJK 23rd May 2017
- Other names: Helsingin derby, Helsinki derby
- Location: Helsinki, Finland
- Teams: HIFK; HJK
- First meeting: HIFK - HJK 7-0 (9 May 1909)
- Latest meeting: HJK - HIFK 2-1 (5 September 2022)

Statistics
- Largest victory: HIFK-HJK 1–9 (1984)

The Stadin derby, also known as the Helsinki derby (Finnish: Helsingin derby, Swedish: Helsingfors derby), is the name for a Helsinki association football fixture played between HIFK Fotboll and HJK Helsinki. The name of the derby derives from the common slang word nickname for Helsinki (Stadi), widely used by the locals. Both the teams play at the highest level of football in Finland, in Veikkausliiga. Before 2015, the clubs had not faced each other at the highest level since 1972 when HIFK got relegated from the top league, which was then known as Mestaruussarja.

The rivalry extends from 1909 when the two teams faced each other for the first time. HJK used to be associated with the Finnish speaking middle-class population at the time, whereas HIFK was known for being a club of the Swedish speaking middle-class population. The language has been the main reason for the rivalry but to date the importance of it has diminished significantly. Before HIFK got relegated from the top league the fixtures had been played at the Helsinki Olympic Stadium, but are nowadays played at the Bolt Arena. Both clubs play their home fixtures at this particular venue.

The two teams clashed for the first time at the top level since 1972 on 23 April 2015. The match was played at a sold out Bolt Arena and ended in a 1-1 draw.

HIFK Fotboll declared bankruptcy in January 2024, and will operate with a new team in the fifth tier of Finnish football, Kolmonen, for the 2024 season. This has led to speculation among fans regarding when, or if, a match between the two teams will be played again.

== Supporters ==
The supporters of both of the teams are known for the rivalry against each other and winning the derby fixtures decides "Stadin herruus" (in English: the mastership of Helsinki) between the clubs. The team which manages to earn more points from Stadin derby fixtures within a single season, are awarded the Stadin herruus-trophy, which was first awarded in the late 1920s. If the points are even, goal difference decides the winner of the trophy. In case the goal differences are same, the winner will be undecided for the season.

The most renowned supporter group of HIFK is known as Stadin kingit (in English: the kings of Helsinki). The supporters of HJK on the other hand are divided into two separate groups: Forza HJK and Sakilaiset. Stadin kingit and Sakilaiset have caused some controversy due to fights and minor football hooliganism between some members of the two groups. For example, prior to a Europa League fixture on 27 November 2014, some supporters of HJK and FC Copenhagen had a fight with each other. Copenhagen supporters were allegedly accompanied by Stadin kingit, as Stadin kingit share a friendship between Copenhagen supporters. Hooliganism is a relatively small issue in Finland and attending football matches in Finland is safe.

According to a 2012 survey, HJK was supported by 25% of all Finnish football supporters and 59% of those living in the Uusimaa region. The HIFK football branch was supported by 7% of all supporters and 12% of those living in Uusimaa. Ultimately both clubs are well supported all over the country as 30% of HJK supporters and 49% of HIFK supporters came outside of the Uusimaa region. However, HIFK's most popular sports section is the ice hockey one.

== Matches ==
Updated 1.2.2020

	Matches	Wins		Draws	Goals	
	Matches	HIFK	HJK	Draws	HIFK	HJK
Finnish Football Championship	76	27	27	22	134	138
Suomensarja	2	2	0	0	4	2
Suomen Cup	7	0	7	0	5	26
Liigacup	2	0	1	1	3	5
Other tournaments	47	24	17	6	128	89
Friendlies	12	4	5	3	17	18
Total	146	57	57	32	291	278

=== HIFK in the league at home ===
Date	Venue	Score	Competition	Attendance
1933		3-0	Mestaruussarja	
1934		2-0	Mestaruussarja	
1935		1-0	Mestaruussarja	
1936		2–1	Mestaruussarja	
1937		3–4	Mestaruussarja	
1938		3–5	Mestaruussarja	
1939		1–5	Mestaruussarja	
1940-41		4-2	Mestaruussarja	
1945-46		2–1	Suomensarja	
21 September 1946	Olympiastadion	7–1	Mestaruussarja	
14 July 1948		3–2	Mestaruussarja	
31 August 1948		1–1	Mestaruussarja	
7 May 1949		4–1	Mestaruussarja	1,1450
30 May 1958		0-3	Mestaruussarja	
20 May 1959	Olympiastadion	1–0	Mestaruussarja	3,355
30 May 1960	Olympiastadion	2–2	Mestaruussarja	
15 May 1961		2–2	Mestaruussarja	
1962		2–1	Mestaruussarja	
1964		3–2	Mestaruussarja	
1965		2–5	Mestaruussarja	4,204
1966		2–3	Mestaruussarja	6,697
1970		1–3	Mestaruussarja	8,485
1971		1–1	Mestaruussarja	3,980
1972		1–2	Mestaruussarja	3,604
23 April 2015	Sonera Stadium	1–1	Veikkausliiga	10,071
10 August 2016	Sonera Stadium	0–0	Veikkausliiga	10,500
30 September 2016	Sonera Stadium	2–1	Veikkausliiga	10,171
23 May 2017	Telia 5G -areena	0-0	Veikkausliiga	10,500

=== HJK in the league at home ===
Date	Venue	Score	Competition	Attendance
1931	Töölön Pallokenttä	2-3	Mestaruussarja	
1933		0–3	Mestaruussarja	
1934		0–3	Mestaruussarja	
1935		4–5	Mestaruussarja	
1936		1–0	Mestaruussarja	
31 August 1937	Töölön Pallokenttä	1–3	Mestaruussarja	4,500
1938		4-1	Mestaruussarja	
1939		3-3	Mestaruussarja	
1940-41		3-2	Mestaruussarja	
1943		2–4	Mestaruussarja	
21 May 1946	Olympiastadion	1-2	Suomensarja	1,683
22 May 1947	Velodromi	1–1	Mestaruussarja	
19 September 1947	Töölön Pallokenttä	2-3	Mestaruussarja	
10 August 1949		1–2	Mestaruussarja	
9 September 1958		1–3	Mestaruussarja	
25 August 1959	Töölön Pallokenttä	0–2	Mestaruussarja	
6 September 1960	Olympiastadion	4–4	Mestaruussarja	
22 August 1961		2–2	Mestaruussarja	
1962		2–1	Mestaruussarja	
1964		0–0	Mestaruussarja	
1965		1–0	Mestaruussarja	6,278
1966		1–1	Mestaruussarja	3,026
1970		1–5	Mestaruussarja	4,688
1971		2–2	Mestaruussarja	2,493
1972		2–3	Mestaruussarja	3,179
6 July 2015	Sonera Stadium	1–1	Veikkausliiga	10,521
24 August 2015	Sonera Stadium	1–1	Veikkausliiga	10,325
26 May 2016	Sonera Stadium	2–1	Veikkausliiga	10,500
31 July 2017	Telia 5G -areena	2–0	Veikkausliiga	10,500
12 September 2017	Telia 5G -areena	2–1	Veikkausliiga	8,567

=== Cup ===
Date	Venue	Matches			Competition	Attendance
Date	Venue	Team 1	Score	Team 2	Competition	Attendance
10 October 1909	Eläintarhan kenttä	HIFK	3-1	HJK	Finnish Football Championship Semi final	
18 September 1910	Kaisaniemen kenttä	HIFK	1-2	HJK	Finnish Football Championship Preliminary round	
15 October 1911	Eläintarhan kenttä	HJK	0-0	HIFK	Finnish Football Championship Semi final	
18 October 1911	Eläintarhan kenttä	HJK	0-0	HIFK	Finnish Football Championship Semi final Rep.	
29 October 1911	Eläintarhan kenttä	HJK	4-0	HIFK	Finnish Football Championship Semi final 2nd Rep.	
20 October 1912	Eläintarhan kenttä	HJK	7-1	HIFK	Finnish Football Championship Final	1,000
3 October 1915	Töölön Pallokenttä	HIFK	1-0	HJK	Finnish Football Championship Quarter-final	450
23 September 1917	Eläintarhan kenttä	HJK	5-2	HIFK	Finnish Football Championship Quarter-final	700
6 October 1918	Eläintarhan kenttä	HJK	1-1	HIFK	Finnish Football Championship Semi final	
13 October 1918	Eläintarhan kenttä	HJK	4-1	HIFK	Finnish Football Championship Semi final Rep.	
26 October 1919	Töölön Pallokenttä	HJK	1-1	HIFK	Finnish Football Championship Semi final	
30 October 1919	Töölön Pallokenttä	HJK	2-1	HIFK	Finnish Football Championship Semi final Rep.	
26 September 1920	Töölön Pallokenttä	HJK	0-0	HIFK	Finnish Football Championship Preliminary round	
3 October 1920	Töölön Pallokenttä	HJK	1-0	HIFK	Finnish Football Championship Preliminary round Rep.	
25 September 1921		HJK	2-2	HIFK	Finnish Football Championship Quarter-final	
1921		HJK	3-2	HIFK	Finnish Football Championship Quarter-final Rep.	
3 September 1922	Töölön Pallokenttä	HIFK	1-4	HJK	Finnish Football Championship Quarter-final	
10 July 1945		HIFK	1-3	HJK	Finnish Football Championship 2nd Round	
1961		HJK	6-1	HIFK	Suomen Cup 2nd Round	1,408
1966		HIFK	2-3	HJK	Suomen Cup Quarter-final	
1984		HIFK	1-9	HJK	Suomen Cup	
14 March 2015	Talin jalkapallohalli	HJK	2-0	HIFK	Liigacup Semi final	542
9 February 2016	Talin jalkapallohalli	HJK	3-3	HIFK	Liigacup Group Stage	827
1 March 2017	Sonera Stadium	HJK	4-0	HIFK	Suomen Cup Group Stage	1,752
24 February 2018	Talin jalkapallohalli	HJK	1-0	HIFK	Suomen Cup Group Stage	700

=== Other ===
Date	Venue	Matches			Competition	Attendance
Date	Venue	Team 1	Score	Team 2	Competition	Attendance
9 May 1909	Kaisaniemen kenttä	HIFK	7-0	HJK	Townsend Trophy	
23 May 1909	Kaisaniemen kenttä	HJK	0-1	HIFK	Hopeapokaali (Helsinki Championship) Semi final	
5 September 1909	Kaisaniemen kenttä	HJK	0-2	HIFK	Friendly	
19 September 1909	Kaisaniemen kenttä	HIFK	2-2	HJK	Friendly	
24 April 1910	Kaisaniemen kenttä	HJK	1-4	HIFK	HJK Trophy	
7 May 1910	Kaisaniemen kenttä	HIFK	4-0	HJK	Unitas Trophy	
10 September 1910	Haapaniemen kenttä	HIFK	3-1	HJK	Townsend Trophy	
7 May 1911	Kaisaniemen kenttä	HIFK	7-2	HJK	HJK- and IFK-Trophy Final	
20 May 1911	Haapaniemen kenttä	HIFK	3-0	HJK	Friendly	
9 September 1911	Eläintarhan kenttä	HJK	3-3	HIFK	Stjärnan Trophy	
22 September 1912	Eläintarhan kenttä	HJK	3-2 (a.e.t.)	HIFK	HJK Trophy Final	
4 May 1913	Eläintarhan kenttä	HJK	2-1	HIFK	Helsinki Championship	
18 October 1914	Eläintarhan kenttä	HIFK	6-1	HJK	Helsinki Championship	
17 October 1915	Töölön Pallokenttä	HJK	2-0	HIFK	Helsinki Championship	
14 May 1916	Eläintarhan kenttä	HJK	5-2	HIFK	HJK Trophy	
21 May 1916	Eläintarhan kenttä	HJK	3-0	HIFK	HJK Trophy	
14 October 1916	Töölön Pallokenttä	HJK	4-0	HIFK	Helsinki Championship	
6 May 1917	Eläintarhan kenttä	HJK	1-1	HIFK	Helsinki Championship	
3 November 1918	Eläintarhan kenttä	HJK	3-0	HIFK	Helsinki Championship	
18 May 1919		HIFK	8-1	HJK	Helsinki Championship	
11 April 1920	Eläintarhan kenttä	HIFK	3-1	HJK	Friendly	
25 April 1920	Eläintarhan kenttä	HIFK	5-0	HJK	Helsinki Championship	
4 July 1920	Töölön Pallokenttä	HIFK	2-0	HJK	Stjärnan Trophy	
14 May 1921	Töölön Pallokenttä	HJK	3-1	HIFK	Helsinki Championship	
13 August 1922	Töölön Pallokenttä	HIFK	1-5	HJK	IFK Trophy Final	
16 August 1922	Töölön Pallokenttä	HJK	9-2	HIFK	HJK "Maalivahtipatsas" Semi final	
4 October 1922	Töölön Pallokenttä	HJK	4-2	HIFK	Sotilaspukimon palkinto	
16 May 1923	Eläintarhan kenttä	HJK	1-1	HIFK	Helsinki Championship	
17 May 1925	Töölön Pallokenttä	HJK	2-1	HIFK	Helsinki Championship	
17 July 1925		HJK	6-2	HIFK	Friendly	
19 May 1926	Töölön Pallokenttä	HJK	0-0	HIFK	Helsinki Championship	
13 June 1926	Töölön Pallokenttä	HJK	2-2	HIFK	HJK "Maalivahtipatsas"	
30 September 1926	Töölön Pallokenttä	HIFK	3-2	HJK	HJK "Maalivahtipatsas"	
18 April 1927	Eläintarhan kenttä	HJK	1-0	HIFK	Friendly	500
3 May 1927	Eläintarhan kenttä	HJK	3-2	HIFK	Helsinki Championship	
15 May 1927	Töölön Pallokenttä	HIFK	4-2	HJK	Suomen sarja	
15 August 1927	Töölön Pallokenttä	HJK	6-2	HIFK	Tina-tuoppi	300

== Honours ==
HJK	Competition	HIFK
National
30	Finnish Championship	7
14	Suomen Cup	-
5	League Cup(1994-2016)	-
49	Total	7
Local
27	Helsinki district championship(1924-1998)	15
27	Total	15
76	Grand Total	22

== Records ==
=== Biggest wins (5+ goals) ===
Margin	Result	Date	Event
8	HIFK - HJK 1-9	1984	Suomen Cup
7	HJK - HIFK 9-2	16.8.1922	HJK:n "Maalivahtipatsas" Quarter-final
7	HIFK - HJK 8-1	18.5.1919	Helsinki Championship
7	HIFK - HJK 7-0	9.5.1909	Townsend Trophy
6	HJK - HIFK 7-1	20.10.1912	Finnish Football Championship Final
6	HIFK - HJK 7-1	21.9.1946	Mestaruussarja
5	HIFK - HJK 7-2	7.5.1911	HJK and IFK Trophy Final
5	HIFK - HJK 6-1	18.10.1914	Helsinki Championship
5	HJK - HIFK 6-1	1966	Suomen Cup 2nd Round
5	HIFK - HJK 5-0	25.4.1920	Helsinki Championship

=== Goalscorers ===
==== Top 10 scorers (Modern era) ====
As of 6 July 2018

Rank	Player	Nationality	Club	Goals
1	Alfredo Morelos	Colombia	HJK	3
2	Evans Mensah	Ghana	HJK	2
3	Filip Valenčič	Slovenia	HJK	2
4	Atomu Tanaka	Japan	HJK	1
5	Joni Korhonen	Finland	HIFK	1
6	Mike Havenaar	Japan	HJK	1
7	Tommi Vesala	Finland	HIFK	1
8	Jukka Sinisalo	Finland	HIFK	1
9	Formose Mendy	Guinea-Bissau	HJK	1
10	Esa Terävä	Finland	HIFK	1

==== Top scorers (Mestaruussarja) ====
Rank	Player	Nationality	Club	Goals
1	Holger Salin	Finland	HIFK	15
2	Aatos Lehtonen	Finland	HJK	12
3	Olof Strömsten	Finland	HIFK	8
4	Matti Paatelainen	Finland	HIFK	6
5	Ernst Grönlund	Finland	HIFK	6

== Players for both clubs ==
This is a list of players who played at least one competitive first team fixture for both clubs either in finnish championship competition or lower division.

Name	Period at HIFK	Period at HJK	Notes
Verner Eklöf	1913–1920	1920–1927	First transfer between clubs
Thor Wikberg	1948-1949	1940-1947	
Rauli Hakala	1960-1963, 1965	1948-1949	
Hannu Kankkonen	1953–1962	1963-1965	
Stig Holmqvist	1955-1962	1963-1964	
Jarmo Lindahl	1973-1974	1965-1966	
Henry Forssell	1966-1967	1968-1980	HJK Hall of Fame member
Tryggve Wahlbäck	1966-1972, 1974-1976	1973	
Timo Rahja	1972	1967-1971, 1973-1976	
Martti Kuusela	1969-1971	1972	Also a head coach for HJK in 1980-1981 and 1990 seasons
Paul Degerth	1971	1969-1970	
Markku Viro	1969-1971	1972-1974	
Juha-Pekka Laine	1971-1973	1974, 1976-1979	
Östen Brännäs	1975-1976	1972-1973	
Raine Salmi	1972-1975	1976-1977	
Matti Kinnunen	1973-1975	1977-1978	
Erkki Salo	1987	1975-1976	
Pasi Jaakonsaari	1976-1978	1980-1984, 1991-1992	
Adil Ismail	1987-1991	1977-1981	
fi:Risto Salomaa	1983-????	1978-1981	
Reima Kokko	1984-1985	1979-1982	
Petteri Paukku	1987-1988	1979-1980	
Mika Muhonen	1987-1988	1982-1985	
Mika Väyrynen(1965)	1992-1993, 1995-1997	1987-1990	
Janne Murtomäki	2001-2002	1988, 1993-1994	
Erkka V. Lehtola	1992, 1999	1996-1997, 1998	
Jari Takatalo	1998-2002	1993	
Mikael Forssell	2017	1997-1998, 2012-2014, 2016	
Jani Nyholm	1999-2001	2001	
Juho Mäkelä	2016-2018	2003-2006,2008-2010, 2012	
Otto-Pekka Jurvainen	2015-2018	2004	
Antonio Inutile	2014	2006	
Tuomas Aho	2015-2016	2006-2008	
Mika Johansson	2012, 2014-2016	2007	
Ville Taulo	2013-2016	2008-2009	
Sakari Mattila	2020-	2008, 2012-2013	
Mika Väyrynen	2016-2017	2012-2014	
Fredrik Lassas	2015-2017	2013-2014	
Carljohan Eriksson	2015-2017	2014	
Moshtagh Yaghoubi	2020-	2017-2018	
Hannu Patronen	2019-	2017-2018	

Other:

- Tommy Lindholm played for HIFK in 1969 and 1970 seasons and managed HJK in 1996
- Hannu Kautiainen played for HJK from 1970 to 1976 and coached HIFK for 10 seasons after his playing career
- Gösta Löfgren was founding member of HJK but left the club before the first finnish championship in 1908 and later joined HIFK
- Antti Muurinen Head coach for HJK 1997-1999 and 2007-2012 and for HIFK 2016-2017
