= Ville (given name) =

Ville is a Finnish and Swedish male given name. Its name day is celebrated on the 6th of April. In Finland, it reached its peak of popularity in the last two decades of the 20th century.

== Origin and variants ==
It might have originated as a variant of the name Vilho, which in turn is the Finnish form of William. The names Wille and Vili are variants of Ville.

== Notable people ==
- Ville Andersson (born 1972), Finnish footballer
- Ville Haapasalo (born 1972), Finnish actor
- Ville Husso (born 1995), Finnish professional ice hockey goaltender
- Ville Itälä (born 1959), Finnish politician
- Ville Jalasto (born 1986), Finnish professional footballer
- Ville Kähkönen (born 1984), Finnish Nordic combined skier
- Ville Kiviniemi (1877–1951), Finnish politician
- Ville Koistinen (born 1982), Finnish professional ice hockey defenceman
- Ville Laihiala (born 1973), Finnish vocalist and guitarist
- Ville Lång (born 1985), Finnish male badminton player
- Ville Larinto (born 1990), Finnish ski jumper
- Ville Leino (born 1983), Finnish professional ice hockey forward
- Ville Liukko (born 1974), Finnish professional tennis player
- Ville Mäntymaa (born 1985), Finnish professional ice hockey defenceman
- Ville Nieminen (born 1977), Finnish professional ice hockey forward
- Ville Niinistö (born 1976), Finnish politician
- Ville Nousiainen (born 1983), Finnish cross country skier
- Ville Nylund (born 1972), Finnish footballer
- Ville Peltonen (born 1973), Finnish professional ice hockey forward
- Ville Pessi (1902–1983), Finnish politician
- Ville Pokka (born 1994), Finnish professional ice hockey player
- Ville Ritola (1896–1982), Finnish long-distance runner
- Ville Sirén (born 1964), Finnish professional ice hockey defender
- Ville Sorvali (born 1980), Finnish musician and music journalist
- Ville Tiisanoja (born 1975), Finnish shot putter
- Ville Vänni (born 1979), Finnish musician
- Ville Vainola (born 1996), Finnish professional ice hockey defenceman
- Ville Väisänen (born 1977), Finnish footballer
- Ville Vallgren (1855–1940), Finnish sculptor
- Ville Valo (born 1976), Finnish singer and songwriter
- Ville Virtanen (actor) (born 1961), Finnish actor
- Ville Virtanen (born 1975), better known by his stage name Darude, Finnish DJ
- Ville Wallén (born 1976), Finnish footballer
- Wille Mäkelä (born 1974), Finnish curler and Olympic medalist
