= Joonas Rantanen =

Finnish football manager (born 1987)

Personal information
- Date of birth: 27 July 1987 (age 39)
- Place of birth: Finland

Team information
- Current team: HJK (manager)

Youth career
- Years: Team
- Gnistan

Managerial career
- 2016–2019: HJK women
- 2020: Klubi 04
- 2021: HJK (assistant)
- 2022–2023: Gnistan
- 2024–2025: Ilves
- 2026–: HJK

Joonas Rantanen (born 27 July 1987) is a Finnish football manager, currently working as a manager of Veikkausliiga club HJK. He has obtained a UEFA Pro -coaching license.

== Coaching career ==
Rantanen was raised in Oulunkylä neighbourhood of Helsinki, and played in a local club IF Gnistan as a youth player. His first coaching position was also in a youth team of Gnistan.

=== HJK organisation ===
Rantanen started as a sports coordinator for youth teams in HJK Helsinki organisation in 2009. He worked for HJK in various positions until 2015, when he had a brief study leave.

During 2016–2019, Rantanen worked as a head coach of HJK women's team competing in Naisten Liiga, leading the team to win Finnish championship title in 2019, and Finnish Women's Cup in 2017 and 2019.

He was named the head coach of Klubi 04, the reserve team of HJK men's team, for the 2020 season, winning the Kakkonen Group B and gaining a promotion to Ykkönen. Rantanen worked as an assistant coach in Toni Koskela's coaching staff in HJK first team for the 2021 Veikkausliiga season.

=== Gnistan ===
In October 2021, Rantanen returned to his former club Gnistan, and during 2022–2023 he served as the head coach of the club's first team in the second-tier Ykkönen. At the end of the 2023 season, he led the team to finish as Ykkönen runner-up and qualify for the Veikkausliiga promotion play-offs, eventually losing to IFK Mariehamn. However, Gnistan were later granted the Veikkausliiga license and promoted via supplemental process, after FC Honka was declared for bankruptcy.

=== Ilves ===
On 23 October 2023, Rantanen was appointed as the manager of Veikkausliiga club Ilves on a two-year deal, starting in 2024, and reuniting with former HJK sporting director Miika Takkula. In his first season as a manager in the top tier, he coached the team in the 2024–25 UEFA Conference League qualifiers, advancing to the 3rd round by an aggregate win against Austria Wien. He was named the Veikkausliiga Manager of the Month in September 2024, after leading his team to a winning streak during the month. He led Ilves to finish as the season's runners-up, falling two points short of the champions KuPS.

On 19 April 2025, after a 5–0 away win over KTP, Rantanen led Ilves to the club's record-breaking streak of eight consecutive league victories. One week later, he extended his contract with Ilves.

=== Return to HJK ===
On 30 November 2025, HJK announced the signing of Rantanen as the new head coach on a three-year deal. HJK paid Ilves a fee of €250,000 for his contract.

== Personal life ==
Rantanen has graduated as a Master of Education (MEd).

His father Jari Rantanen is a former police and football coach.

His brothers Tuomas and Juuso have also worked for Gnistan.

== Managerial statistics ==
As of 31 July 2025

Team	Nat	From	To	Record				
Team	Nat	From	To	P	W	D	L	W%
HJK women	(Finland)	25 August 2016	31 December 2019	84	58	12	14	69.05
Klubi 04	(Finland)	1 January 2020	31 December 2020	20	17	2	1	85.00
Gnistan	(Finland)	1 January 2022	31 December 2023	71	34	20	17	47.89
Ilves	(Finland)	1 January 2024	30 November 2025	81	43	17	21	53.09
HJK	(Finland)	30 November 2025	present					
Total				256	152	51	53	59.38

== Managerial honours ==
HJK women

- Naisten Liiga: 2019
- Finnish Women's Cup: 2017, 2019

Klubi 04

- Kakkonen, Group B: 2020

Gnistan

- Ykkönen runner-up: 2023

Ilves

- Veikkausliiga runner-up: 2024

Individual

- Western Finland FA Manager of the Year: 2024
- Veikkausliiga Manager of the Month: September 2024
