= Kari Rissanen =

Finnish former footballer (born 1966)

Personal information
- Date of birth: 29 August 1966 (age 60)
- Place of birth: Helsinki, Finland
- Height: 1.84 m (6 ft 0 in)
- Position: Midfielder

Youth career
- 1976–1980: EPS
- 1981–1984: HJK

Senior career*
Years	Team	Apps	(Gls)
1985–1991	HJK	123	(27)
1989	→ Geylang International (loan)	12	(5)
1992	Ilves	33	(2)
1992	→ Geylang International (loan)	10	(3)
1993–1997	FinnPa	126	(6)
1995	→ Dunfermline Athletic (loan)	2	(0)
1998–1999	Ikast	25	(4)
1999–2000	Midtjylland	13	(3)
2000	Jokerit	15	(1)
2001	Atlantis	29	(2)
2002–2003	AC Allianssi	43	(0)
2004	PK-35	20	(4)

International career
1984	Finland U17	5	(0)
1985	Finland U18	2	(1)
1986–1989	Finland U21	9	(0)
1987–1998	Finland	25	(1)
- * Club domestic league appearances and goals

Kari Rissanen (born 29 August 1966) is a Finnish former professional footballer who played as a midfielder. He was capped 25 times for the Finland national team, scoring one goal. While playing for HJK Helsinki, Rissanen won four Finnish championship titles. Besides in his native Finland, Rissanen played in Singapore, Scotland and Denmark.

Later he has worked as a sports masseur for the Finland national team.

== Career statistics ==
Appearances and goals by national team and year
National team	Year	Apps	Goals
Finland
Finland	1988	3	0
Finland	1989	0	0
Finland	1990	0	0
Finland	1991	0	0
Finland	1992	0	0
Finland	1993	0	0
Finland	1994	0	0
Finland	1995	3	0
Finland	1996	8	1
Finland	1997	7	0
Finland	1998	3	0
Total		24	1

Scores and results list Finland's goal tally first, score column indicates score after each Rissanen goal.

List of international goals scored by Kari Rissanen
No.	Date	Venue	Opponent	Score	Result	Competition
1.	16 February 1996	Rajamangala Stadium, Bangkok, Thailand	Thailand	2–4	2–5	Friendly

== Honours ==
HJK

- Mestaruussarja: 1985, 1987, 1988
- Veikkausliiga: 1990

Atlantis

- Finnish Cup: 2001

Geylang International

- FAS Premier League: 1989, 1992
