= Helsingin Jalkapalloklubi =

Association football club in Helsinki, Finland

HJK Helsinki
- Full name: Helsingin Jalkapalloklubi
- Nickname: Klubi (The Club)
- Founded: 19 June 1907; 119 years ago
- Ground: Töölö Football Stadium
- Capacity: 10,770
- Chairman: Olli-Pekka Lyytikäinen
- Manager: Joonas Rantanen
- League: Veikkausliiga
- 2026: Veikkausliiga, 2nd of 12
- Website: www.hjk.fi
Home colours	Away colours	Third colours

Helsingin Jalkapalloklubi (lit. 'Helsinki's Football Club'), commonly known as HJK Helsinki (Swedish: HJK Helsingfors) outside of Finland, or simply as HJK (Finnish: ['hoː jiː koː]), is a Finnish football club based in Helsinki. The club competes in Veikkausliiga, the top division of the Finnish football league system. Founded in 1907, the club has spent most of its history in the top tier of Finnish football. The club's home ground is the 10,770-seat Töölö Football Stadium, where they have played their home games since 2000.

Generally considered as Finland's biggest football club, HJK is the most successful Finnish club in terms of championship titles with 33. The club has also won 14 Finnish Cups and 6 Finnish League Cups. Many of Finland's most successful players have played for HJK before moving abroad. The club has also similar success with women's Kansallinen Liiga.

HJK is the only Finnish club that has participated in the UEFA Champions League group stage. In 1998, they beat Metz in the play-off round to clinch their place in the competition for the following season. HJK have also participated twice in the group stages of the UEFA Europa League in 2014–15 and 2022–23 respectively, along with appearing three times in the UEFA Europa Conference League. The club's highest score in a European competition came during the 2011–12 season, with a 13–0 aggregate victory over Welsh champions Bangor City, which included a 10–0 home win.

HJK's traditional kit colours have long been blue and white striped shirts with blue shorts and socks. The club's crest has been nearly untouched for a century, it has only undergone one minor font change to modernize it.

== History ==
=== 20th century ===
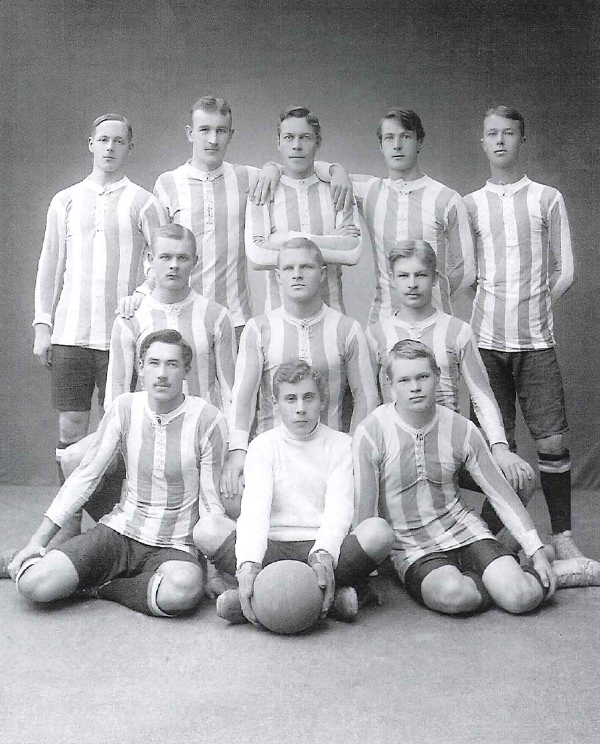
HJK squad that won the club's first title in 1911.

The club was founded as Helsingin Jalkapalloklubi – Helsingfors Fotbollsklubb in 1907 by Fredrik Wathén. The founding meeting was held at a bowling alley in Kaisaniemi Park in May. The first ever competitive fixture was played against Ekenäs IF in Ekenäs. HJK won 2–4.

Early on, HJK became popular among Finnish-speaking students, while Swedish-speaking students preferred to play mainly for Unitas or HIFK. In late 1908, after a heated debate, the language was switched to unilingually Finnish and this resulted in many Swedish-speaking members switching over to HIFK and other clubs, although a few chose to stay.

In 1909, the colours blue and white were chosen to support the fennoman movement and bandy was introduced as the club's second official sport. The club moved from Kaisaniemi Ground to the new Eläintarha Stadium. At the end of the year, Fredrik Wathen was forced to leave his post as the club's chairman due to illness.

In 1910, Lauri Tanner became the longest-running club chairman to date. The same year, the club's first international match was played, against Eriksdals IF from Stockholm in Kaisaniemi. The first championship title was won in 1911. In 1915, the club moved to newly build Töölön Pallokenttä. In 1916, tennis was introduced as the third official sport in HJK, and it was played in the club until the early 1920s. During the Finnish Civil War in 1918, two HJK club members, fighting for the "Whites", were killed.

In 1921, the first bandy championship was won and during the following five seasons, HJK reached five finals, winning three more titles. Bowling was added to the club's repertoire in 1925, but the bowlers formed their own club, Helsingin Keilaajat, the following year. In 1928, ice hockey became an official sport and the first championship was won in 1929. League format was introduced to Finnish football in 1930 but HJK failed to qualify for the first season. In 1931, HJK played their first season in the league, however at the end of the season, they were relegated.

During World War II, HJK lost 22 members serving in the military, of which nine fell in the Winter War, twelve in the Continuation War and one in the Lapland War. In 1943, handball was introduced as the club's sixth official sport. HJK won one silver and two bronze medals in handball during the following three seasons but did not gain further success. Handball was first of HJK's sports where women also competed. The women's team played a total of 22 seasons at the highest level; their highest finish was fourth.

In 1963, HJK played their last ever season in the second level of the football pyramid, winning 20 out of 22 matches and scoring 127 goals. In 1964, the newly promoted club won their tenth championship title and the following season, in 1965–66, they played their first European Cup match, against Manchester United at the Helsinki Olympic Stadium. However, a 2–9 aggregate loss resulted in HJK's elimination from the competition.

In 1966, the club secured their first ever cup title by winning KTP 6–1 in the final in front of 7,000 spectators. Bandy section was disbanded in the late 1960s. The last official sport, figure skating, was added into the club's repertoire in 1966, was abolished in 1972. The ice hockey section was also disbanded in 1972 and the last season in handball was played in 1978. Hereafter, HJK therefore only participated in football following 69 years as a multisport club.

=== 1998–1999: First Champions League appearance ===

The starting line-up in HJK's first-ever UEFA Champions League group stage match against PSV on 16 September 1998.

The 1998–99 season saw HJK become the first and, to date, only Finnish club to play in the group stage of the UEFA Champions League, after defeating Metz in the second qualifying round. The club also managed a respectable five points in their group, defeating Benfica at home and earning draws at home to 1. FC Kaiserslautern and away to Benfica. They lost to PSV twice and to Kaiserslautern away.

=== 2000–2018: First Europa League appearance ===
The club's current home stadium, the Bolt Arena, was opened in 2000. The 20th championship title was won in 2002, and in 2008 the club won its tenth Finnish Cup title. The 2009 season was the start of a championship run that resulted in six titles in a row from 2009 to 2014.

In 2014, HJK became the first Finnish club to play in the UEFA Europa League group stage after defeating Rapid Wien in the play-off round. HJK, with wins over Torino and Copenhagen at home, finished third in their group with six points.

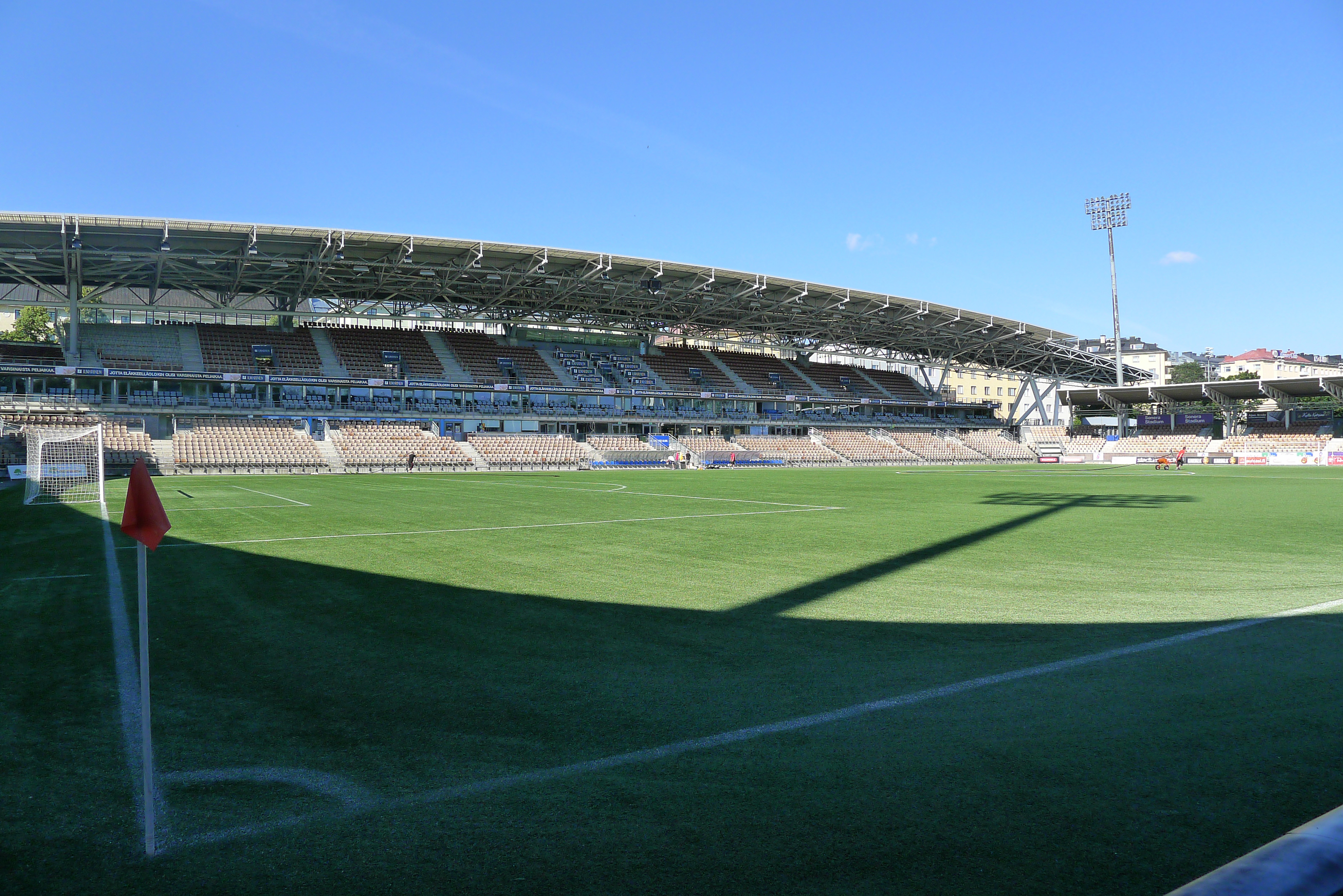
Bolt Arena, located in the Töölö district of Helsinki, was opened in 2000.

HJK made several acquisitions during the winter of 2015, including Córdoba forward Mike Havenaar, J-league playmaker Atomu Tanaka and Birmingham City holding midfielder Guy Moussi. With the new signings on their side, HJK began the season on a high by winning the league cup, a feat they had not accomplished since 1998. HJK also played its first local derby against HIFK since April 1972, drawing 1–1. However, HJK could not replicate the league success they had enjoyed for the last six seasons, finishing the 2015 season in third place, behind champions SJK and runners-up RoPS.

During the 2017 campaign the club lost only three games, which resulted in a domestic double.

HJK won the 2018 Veikkausliiga, 16 points clear at the top.

=== 2019–2023: Toni Koskela era ===
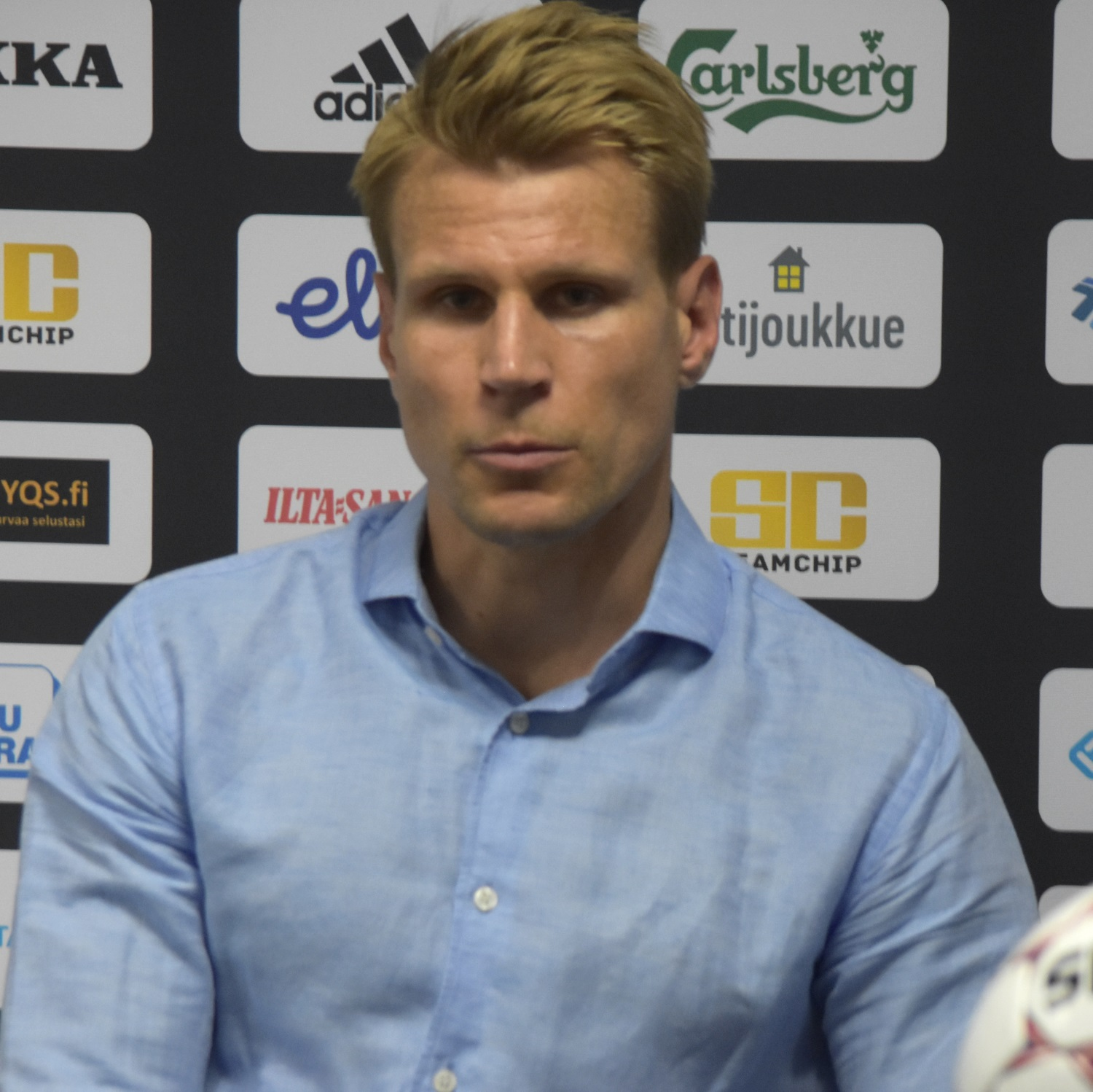
Toni Koskela managed HJK to win three Veikkausliiga titles in 2020–2022

HJK failed to win the 2019 championship, as KuPS won the league. HJK's season was unusually unsuccessful, manager Mika Lehkosuo was replaced by Toni Koskela mid-season, and the club finished in a disappointing 5th place in the league with 37 points. During the season, HJK named Miika Takkula their new sporting director in July.

Koskela's first three full seasons have seen HJK win three titles in a row, including the club's 30th championship in 2020. HJK also won the Finnish cup in 2020. For the 2022 season, HJK loaned in some new additions like Conor Hazard, Nassim Boujellab, Bojan Radulović and Malik Abubakari. The club's 2022 title was a remarkable 11th in 15 years.

The club has also fared well in European competitions under Koskela. During the 2021 season, HJK qualified for the 2021–22 UEFA Europa Conference League group stage, where they finished 3rd in the group with six points. During the 2022 season, HJK qualified for the 2022–23 UEFA Europa League for only the second time in the club's history, by defeating Silkeborg IF 2–1 on aggregate in the play-off round. HJK's group included Italian AS Roma, Spanish Real Betis, and Bulgarian Ludogorets. Despite valiant home performances, HJK performed poorly on the road, losing all three away games with a total goal difference of 0–7. HJK ended the campaign fourth in the group with a single point, from a 1–1 draw to Ludogorets at home.

HJK started the 2023 Veikkausliiga season relatively poorly, and eventually head coach Koskela was dismissed, following a 1–0 home victory against Larne FC in the Champions League qualifiers in July.

=== 2023–present ===
Koskela was replaced by his last season's assistant coach Toni Korkeakunnas. Korkeakunnas led HJK to a third consecutive European group stage, advancing to the 2023–24 UEFA Europa Conference League, by defeating Romanian champions Farul Constanța in the play-off round 3–2 on aggregate. HJK also renewed their league title for the fourth straight season, on a goal difference against KuPS.

After the season, the club announced that Korkeakunnas will not receive a contract extension, and that the new manager would be announced soon. It was also announced earlier in late August 2023, that sporting director Miika Takkula departs from the club. In September, Vesa Mäki was named as his replacement as a new sporting director.

On 3 November 2023, the club announced that they had appointed Spanish coach Ferran Sibila as the manager of HJK on a two-year deal, starting in January 2024. On 21 December, it was reported by Helsingin Sanomat that Sibila lacks the required UEFA Pro -coaching licence, and thus would not be eligible to work solely as a head coach in Veikkausliiga. The club's new sporting director Vesa Mäki, who was in charge of recruiting Sibila, said in the media that Sibila is going to start the required UEFA Pro -training in February 2024 in Sweden, or the club could name their assistant coach Ossi Virta as an associate head coach with Sibila.

On 3 January 2024, it was reported in Swedish media that Sibila was not granted a spot in the aforementioned UEFA Pro -training class by Swedish FA. The next day, HJK announced that the club will comply with the licence requirements set by Veikkausliiga, Finnish FA and UEFA. On 12 January, HJK appointed Ossi Virta as the club's new interim head coach, until Sibila is able to attend the UEFA Pro -class.

During the 2024 pre-season, reigning Veikkausliiga Top Goalscorer Bojan Radulović was sold to Huddersfield Town for £1.2 million and Defender of the Year Tuomas Ollila was acquired by Paris FC.

On 20 May 2024, Ferran Sibila and the sporting director Vesa Mäki were both sacked and Toni Korkeakunnas was appointed the head coach of the first team again.

Winger Topi Keskinen joined Aberdeen FC in August for an estimated transfer fee of around €1 million. During the summer of 2024, as has become routine, HJK made a slate of transfers mid-season as the team's form remained poor. The club brought in striker and former Veikkausliiga golden boot winner Lee Erwin, goalkeeper Thijmen Nijhuis, centre-backs Georgios Antzoulas and Daniel O'Shaughnessy, midfielder Kevor Palumets, and wingers Alessandro Albanese and Ozan Kökcü. Despite being knocked out of the Champions League earlier in the 1st qualifying round by Panevėžys, HJK managed to qualify for the 2024–25 UEFA Conference League new league phase, after defeating KÍ Klaksvík in the play-off round 3–2 on aggregate with two stoppage-time goals, making it the club's fourth consecutive appearance in the final phase of a European competition. During the club's European qualification campaign, Erwin scored five goals in six matches, including three goals over the two games against Klaksvik.

After HJK was not able to defend their championship and had finished third in Veikkausliiga, in late October 2024 the club appointed Petri Vuorinen the new sporting director to fill the vacancy. Korkeakunnas led the club to start the 2025 Veikkausliiga season with a historical record-breaking six-game losing streak. Korkeakunnas was fired on 4 May, after 1–1 draw against Inter Turku. Assistant coach Miika Nuutinen was named the interim manager.

HJK started their European campaign poorly by losing 4–0 away against Faroese club NSÍ Runavík in the first leg game of the 2025–26 UECL qualifiers. However, they managed to advance to the second round, thanks to a 5–0 comeback win at home. Next round they were knocked out by Bulgarian Arda Kardzhali on penalties. In late-September, HJK won the 2025 Finnish Cup title by 1–0 win over KuPS, which was the club's first cup title since 2020. They finished the 2025 season in disappointing 5th place, having not won a single game in Veikkausliiga championship group in over two years.

After the 2025 league season, HJK announced Joonas Rantanen as the new head coach. They had paid Ilves €250,000 for buy-out of his contract.

== Crest and colours ==
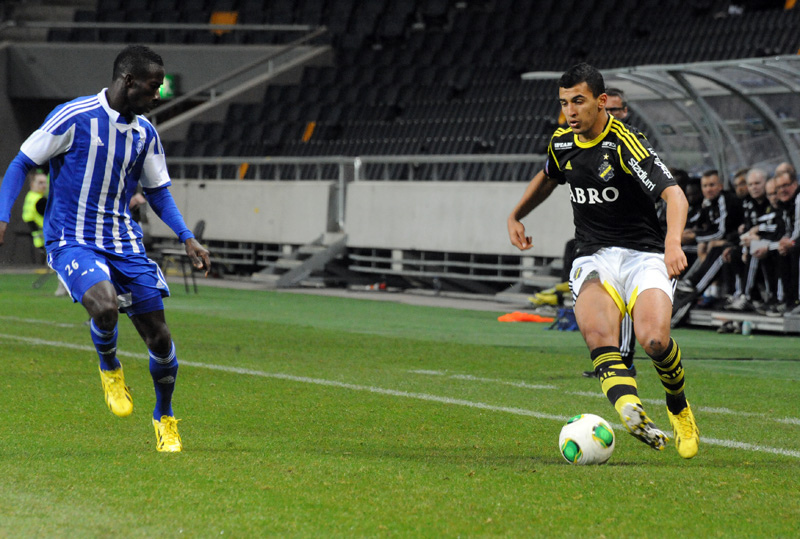
Nabil Bahoui of AIK taking on HJK winger Demba Savage during a friendly match in March 2013

=== Badge ===
In 1910, HJK arranged competition to find a crest for club, but the club board wasn't happy with the proposals. The crest was finally designed by Osmo Korvenkontio in 1913, it has only gone through minor changes during history.

=== Colours ===
First kit of HJK was plain white shirt, black shorts and black socks with few white horizontal stripes on top. In 1909 HJK introduced its trademark blue and white striped shirt. Blue and white colours were homage to fennoman movement. Black trunks still remained for decades. Shirt was changed to unicolour blue for season 1973 due to pressure from sponsors. In attempt to professionalize hockey department club had fallen in to financial despair and sponsors demanded more visibility for their logos. Clubs financial situation had improved by 1986 and due fans demands shirt was changed back to striped by the end of the year and has remained so ever since.

HJK home colours 1907–08	HJK home colours 1909–50s	HJK home colours 1960s–72, 1986–	HJK home colours 1973	HJK home colours 1979	HJK home colours 1985

== Honours ==
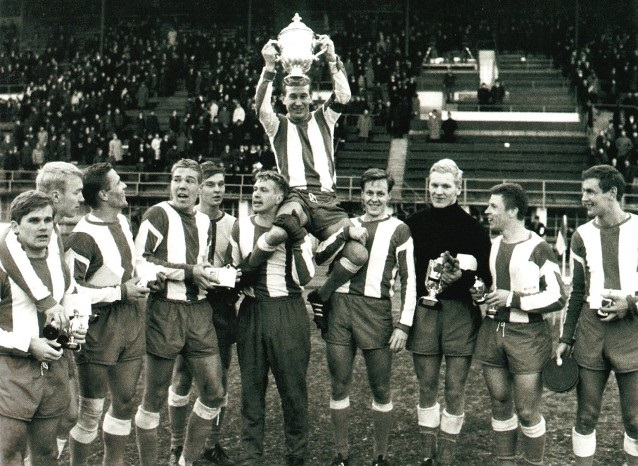
HJK after winning the club's first Finnish Cup title in 1966

- Veikkausliiga:
  - Winners (33): 1911, 1912, 1917, 1918, 1919, 1923, 1925, 1936, 1938, 1964, 1973, 1978, 1981, 1985, 1987, 1988, 1990, 1992, 1997, 2002, 2003, 2009, 2010, 2011, 2012, 2013, 2014, 2017, 2018, 2020, 2021, 2022, 2023
  - Runners-up (14): 1921, 1933, 1937, 1939, 1956, 1965, 1966, 1982, 1983, 1999, 2001, 2005, 2006, 2016
- Finnish Cup:
  - Winners (15): 1966, 1981, 1984, 1993, 1996, 1998, 2000, 2003, 2006, 2008, 2011, 2014, 2016–17, 2020, 2025
  - Runners-up (9): 1975, 1985, 1990, 1994, 2010, 2016, 2017–18, 2021, 2026
- Finnish League Cup:
  - Winners (6): 1994, 1996, 1997, 1998, 2015, 2023
  - Runners-up (3): 1995, 2009, 2012

Honours of HJK women and other sports

=== Women's football ===
- Finnish Women's Championship:
  - Winners (24): 1971, 1972, 1973, 1974, 1975, 1979, 1980, 1981, 1984, 1986, 1987, 1988, 1991. 1992, 1995, 1996, 1997, 1998, 1999, 2000, 2001, 2005, 2019, 2024
- Finnish Women's Cup:
  - Winners (17): 1981, 1984, 1985, 1986, 1991, 1992, 1993, 1998, 1999, 2000, 2002, 2006, 2007, 2008, 2010, 2017, 2019

=== Ice hockey ===
- Finnish Championship:
  - Winners (3): 1928–29, 1931–32, 1934–35
  - Runners-up (6): 1930–31, 1932–33, 1937–38, 1938–39, 1940–41, 1971–72
- Finnish Cup:
  - Winners (1): 1970

=== Bandy ===
- Finnish Championship:
  - Winners (5): 1921, 1923, 1924, 1928, 1937
  - Runners-up (3): 1925, 1927, 1946

=== Figure skating ===
- Finnish Champions
  - Pia Wingisaar: 1966, 1967
  - Anuliisa Numminen: 1970
  - Tarja Säde: 1971
  - Tarja Näsi: 1972

== League history ==
- 86 seasons in Veikkausliiga/Mestaruussarja/SM-Sarja
- 6 seasons in Ykkönen/Suomisarja

Season to Season of HJK Helsinki

Season	Level	Division	Section	Record	Position	Movements
1931	Tier 1	SM-Sarja (Division One)		7 0 3 4 12–16 3	7th	Relegated
1932	Tier 2	Suomensarja (Division Two)		5 4 0 1 10–4 8	1st	Promoted
1933	Tier 1	SM-Sarja (Division One)		14 5 6 3 20–14 16	2nd	
1934	Tier 1	SM-Sarja (Division One)		14 5 4 5 23–18 14	5th	
1935	Tier 1	SM-Sarja (Division One)		14 6 2 6 32–26 14	4th	
1936	Tier 1	SM-Sarja (Division One)		14 9 1 4 37–21 19	1st	Champions
1937	Tier 1	SM-Sarja (Division One)		14 8 4 2 58–24 20	2nd	
1938	Tier 1	SM-Sarja (Division One)		14 8 4 2 43–24 20	1st	Champions
1939	Tier 1	SM-Sarja (Division One)		13 7 4 2 40–18 18	2nd	
1940–1941	Tier 1	SM-Sarja (Division One)		12 4 2 6 22–30 10	5th	
1943–1944	Tier 1	SM-Sarja (Division One)		7 1 2 4 20–22 4	7th	
1945	Tier 1	SM-Sarja (Division One)		5 2 1 2 11–13 5	5th	Relegated
1945–1946	Tier 2	Suomensarja (Division Two)		14 11 0 3 60–25 20	2nd	Promoted
1946–1947	Tier 1	SM-Sarja (Division One)		14 4 3 7 26–41 11	6th	
1947–1948	Tier 1	SM-Sarja (Division One)		14 6 2 6 33–27 14	5th	
1948	Tier 1	SM-Sarja (Division One)		15 6 6 3 32–20 18	4th	
1949	Tier 1	SM-Sarja (Division One)		22 5 4 13 27–55	10th	Relegated
1950	Tier 2	Suomensarja (Division Two)	East	18 13 3 2 56–17 29	2nd	
1951	Tier 2	Suomensarja (Division Two)	East	18 12 2 4 56–20 26	2nd	
1952	Tier 2	Suomensarja (Division Two)	West	18 12 3 3 63–27 27	1st	Promoted
1953	Tier 1	SM-Sarja (Division One)		18 7 3 8 28–22 17	6th	
1954	Tier 1	SM-Sarja (Division One)		18 9 4 5 31–18 22	3rd	
1955	Tier 1	SM-Sarja (Division One)		18 5 5 8 35–35 15	8th	
1956	Tier 1	SM-Sarja (Division One)		18 9 3 6 39–28 21	2nd	
1957	Tier 1	SM-Sarja (Division One)		18 5 8 5 26–26 18	6th	
1958	Tier 1	SM-Sarja (Division One)		18 9 2 7 45–34 20	5th	
1959	Tier 1	SM-Sarja (Division One)		18 4 5 9 28–39 13	8th	
1960	Tier 1	SM-Sarja (Division One)		22 5 8 9 44–51 18	9th	
1961	Tier 1	SM-Sarja (Division One)		22 7 7 8 42–41 21	6th	
1962	Tier 1	SM-Sarja (Division One)		22 6 4 12 33–57 16	11th	Relegated
1963	Tier 2	Suomensarja (Division Two)	East	22 20 1 1 127–18 41	1st	Promoted
1964	Tier 1	SM-Sarja (Division One)		22 14 6 2 42–18 34	1st	Champions
1965	Tier 1	SM-Sarja (Division One)		22 12 5 5 50–30 29	2nd	
1966	Tier 1	SM-Sarja (Division One)		22 10 7 5 46–30 27	2nd	
1967	Tier 1	SM-Sarja (Division One)		22 11 3 8 59–38 25	5th	
1968	Tier 1	SM-Sarja (Division One)		22 11 7 4 51–30 29	3rd	
1969	Tier 1	SM-Sarja (Division One)		22 11 5 6 50–32 27	3rd	
1970	Tier 1	SM-Sarja (Division One)		22 9 7 6 37–26 25	5th	
1971	Tier 1	SM-Sarja (Division One)		26 10 11 5 46–32 31	4th	
1972	Tier 1	SM-Sarja (Division One)		22 10 1 11 24–32 21	9th	
1973	Tier 1	SM-Sarja (Division One)		22 14 5 3 36–21 33	1st	Champions
1974	Tier 1	SM-Sarja (Division One)		22 12 4 6 43–27 28	3rd	
1975	Tier 1	SM-Sarja (Division One)		22 8 2 12 29–37 18	8th	
1976	Tier 1	SM-Sarja (Division One)		22 12 5 5 40–25 29	3rd	
1977	Tier 1	SM-Sarja (Division One)		22 9 5 8 27–25 23	7th	
1978	Tier 1	SM-Sarja (Division One)		22 13 7 2 52–29 33	1st	Champions
1979	Tier 1	SM-Sarja (Division One)		29 14 7 8 48–36 35	3rd	
1980	Tier 1	SM-Sarja (Division One)		29 15 9 5 48–28 24	3rd	
1981	Tier 1	SM-Sarja (Division One)		29 17 5 7 57–32 25	1st	Champions
1982	Tier 1	SM-Sarja (Division One)		29 15 4 10 62–47 22	2nd	
1983	Tier 1	SM-Sarja (Division One)		29 15 9 5 61–37 25	2nd	
1984	Tier 1	SM-Sarja (Division One)		22 10 6 6 49–37 26	5th	
1985	Tier 1	SM-Sarja (Division One)		22 11 6 5 41–23 28(Preliminary)	1st	Champions via Playoffs
1986	Tier 1	SM-Sarja (Division One)		22 10 10 2 42–23 30	3rd	
1987	Tier 1	SM-Sarja (Division One)		22 15 3 4 38–14 33	1st	Champions
1988	Tier 1	SM-Sarja (Division One)		27 20 3 4 55–28 43	1st	Champions
1989	Tier 1	SM-Sarja (Division One)		27 11 7 9 36–28 29	5th	
1990	Tier 1	Veikkausliiga (Division One)		22 11 6 5 40–29 28(Preliminary)	1st	Champions via Playoffs
1991	Tier 1	Veikkausliiga (Division One)		33 14 9 10 61–44 51	5th	
1992	Tier 1	Veikkausliiga (Division One)		33 20 6 7 59–35 66	1st	Champions
1993	Tier 1	Veikkausliiga (Division One)		29 15 4 10 34–26 49	3rd	
1994	Tier 1	Veikkausliiga (Division One)		26 12 7 7 40–29 43	3rd	
1995	Tier 1	Veikkausliiga (Division One)		26 14 10 2 44–18 52	3rd	
1996	Tier 1	Veikkausliiga (Division One)		27 11 5 11 36–37 38	9th	
1997	Tier 1	Veikkausliiga (Division One)		27 18 4 5 53–18 58	1st	Champions
1998	Tier 1	Veikkausliiga (Division One)		27 9 11 7 33–31 38	4th	
1999	Tier 1	Veikkausliiga (Division One)		29 20 5 4 53–18 65	2nd	
2000	Tier 1	Veikkausliiga (Division One)		33 16 9 8 51–33 57	4th	
2001	Tier 1	Veikkausliiga (Division One)		33 19 10 4 64–19 67	2nd	
2002	Tier 1	Veikkausliiga (Division One)		29 20 5 4 51–21 65	1st	Champions
2003	Tier 1	Veikkausliiga (Division One)		26 17 6 3 51–15 57	1st	Champions
2004	Tier 1	Veikkausliiga (Division One)		26 9 12 5 42–31 39	6th	
2005	Tier 1	Veikkausliiga (Division One)		26 15 7 4 43–26 52	2nd	
2006	Tier 1	Veikkausliiga (Division One)		24 13 6 5 45–18 45	2nd	
2007	Tier 1	Veikkausliiga (Division One)		26 7 13 6 31–25 34	7th	
2008	Tier 1	Veikkausliiga (Division One)		26 14 5 7 47–29 47	4th	
2009	Tier 1	Veikkausliiga (Division One)		26 14 10 2 45–21 52	1st	Champions
2010	Tier 1	Veikkausliiga (Division One)		26 15 7 4 43–19 52	1st	Champions
2011	Tier 1	Veikkausliiga (Division One)		33 26 3 4 86–23 81	1st	Champions
2012	Tier 1	Veikkausliiga (Division One)		33 19 7 7 63–33 64	1st	Champions
2013	Tier 1	Veikkausliiga (Division One)		33 22 7 4 78–25 73	1st	Champions
2014	Tier 1	Veikkausliiga (Division One)		33 21 9 3 65–22 72	1st	Champions
2015	Tier 1	Veikkausliiga (Division One)		33 16 10 7 45–30 58	3rd	
2016	Tier 1	Veikkausliiga (Division One)		33 16 10 7 52–36 58	2nd	
2017	Tier 1	Veikkausliiga (Division One)		33 23 7 3 78–16 76	1st	Champions
2018	Tier 1	Veikkausliiga (Division One)		33 24 6 3 61–19 78	1st	Champions
2019	Tier 1	Veikkausliiga (Division One)		27 9 10 8 33–29 37	5th	
2020	Tier 1	Veikkausliiga (Division One)		22 14 6 2 53–17 48	1st	Champions
2021	Tier 1	Veikkausliiga (Division One)		27 18 5 4 41–19 59	1st	Champions
2022	Tier 1	Veikkausliiga (Division One)		27 18 4 5 41–23 58	1st	Champions
2023	Tier 1	Veikkausliiga (Division One)		27 15 8 4 50–26 53	1st	Champions
2024	Tier 1	Veikkausliiga (Division One)		27 13 6 8 44–27 45	3rd	
2025	Tier 1	Veikkausliiga (Division One)		32 14 7 11 52–22 49	5th	

== Supporters and rivalries ==
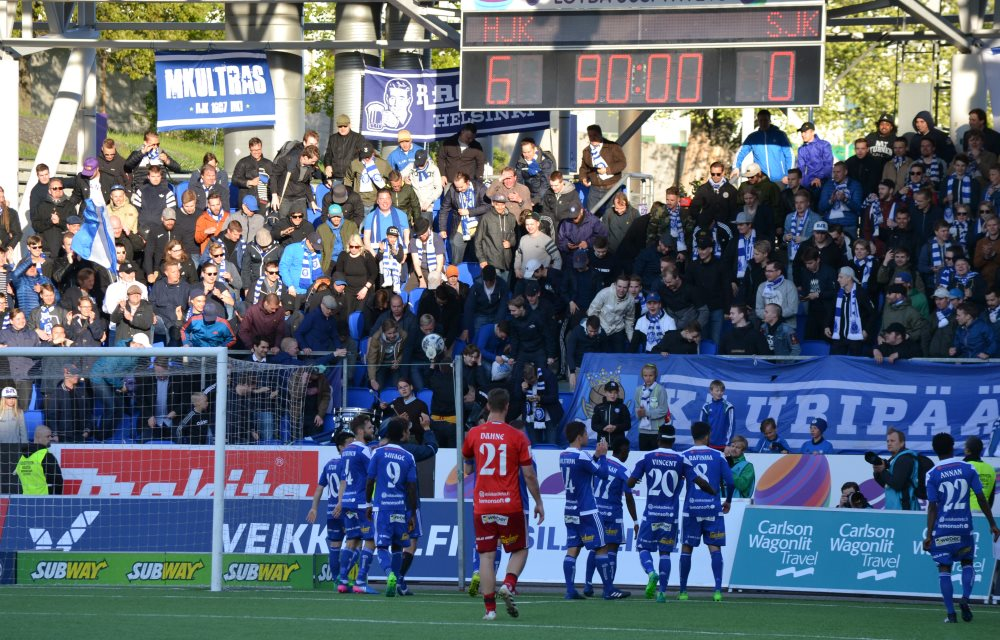
HJK supporters at the Bolt Arena in 2017.

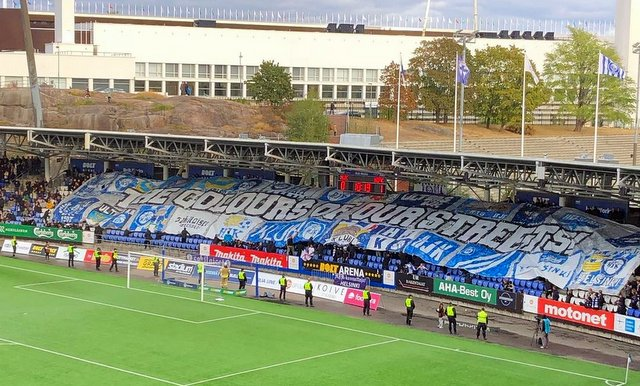
HJK supporters Tifo in 2022

HJK Helsinki supporters Historically HJK had a wide support within Finnish speaking, prosperous middle class of Helsinki. The club's supporters were often nationalistic after the fashion of almost every other Finnish FA club at the time. Leftist working class' clubs played their own leagues and competitions under the Finnish Workers' Sports Federation. However, The club remained open to all 'honorable citizens' regardless of their native language, race or social class, and always had members from other communities as well. Before the 1970s HJK came to be known especially as a Töölöan club due to most of their activity taking place in this particular district.

During recent decades the club's old image as a prosperous, middle class group from Töölö has largely disappeared due to social changes in Finland as well as migration from inner city to housing projects built during the mass migration from the countryside during the 1960s and the 1970s.

=== The Helsinki Derby and other local rivalries ===
HJK's main rivals in Helsinki were widely considered to be Kiffen, HPS and HIFK. In the past these were the four big clubs from Helsinki. The clubs were mainly separated by language, HJK and HPS being Finnish speaking clubs whereas HIFK and KIF were Swedish speaking. These four clubs competed also in bandy, ice hockey and handball. The support for HJK mainly came from around the inner city and after 1940s also from Töölö, in its early years HPS Support came from same areas as HJK. Later in 1940s and 1950s when HJK support shifted more towards Töölö area, HPS gained more support in Vallila and Alppila districts, this was mostly due their youth activities taking part in those particular areas, these boundaries were not strict however and each of the four clubs had support, players and members across the city. HJK were already founding youth teams to new suburbs in 1960s and their reputation as a Töölöan club was short lived. KIF and HPS were both struggling to survive and were both relegated to lower leagues after 1964 season and rapidly lost their support. KIF made a brief two season stint to first level in 1977–78. While both KIF and HPS are still active as of 2020, they have spend their recent decades playing in lower levels, HPS focusing more on youth football in northern Helsinki.

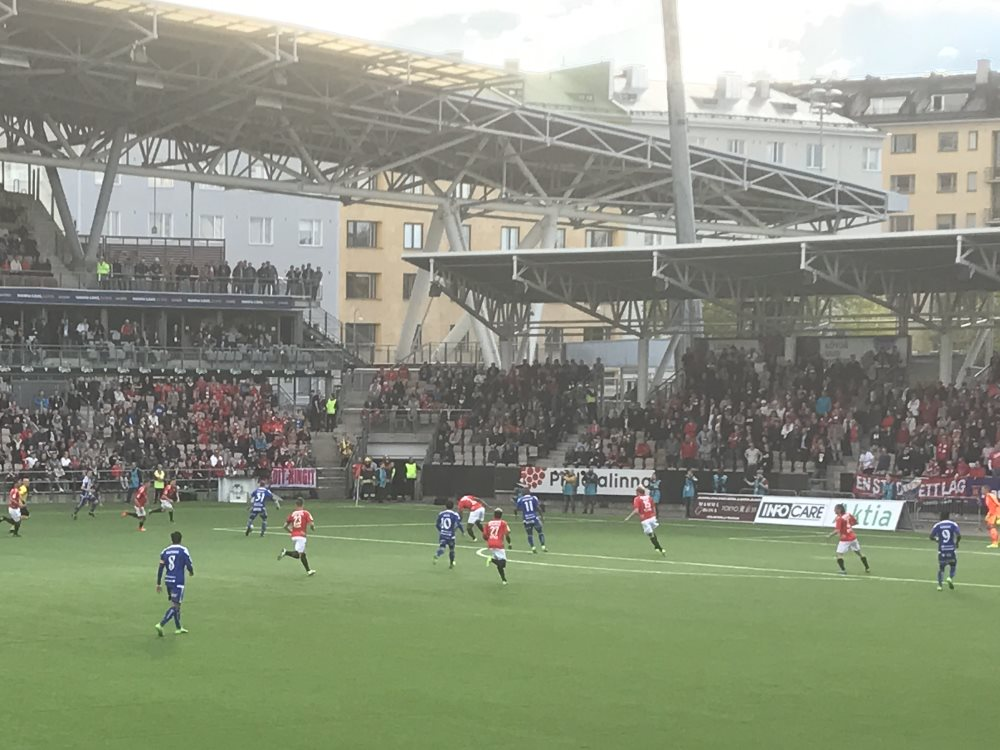
Stadin derby against HIFK in 2017

HJK and HIFK share the biggest rivalry being two of the oldest and most successful clubs. Both were also successful in Bandy which was major winter sport in the first half of the 20th century, KIF and HPS gained lesser success. Also in Ice Hockey clubs faced numerous times and played more seasons in first level than HPS or KIF. A match between these two clubs is called as Stadin derby. Language was the biggest separating factor between the clubs, HIFK was the club of choice for the Swedish speaking population of the city and HJK for the Finnish speaking. In 2015 HIFK was promoted back to the top flight after 40 years of struggling in the lower leagues having played their last season in the top division in 1972. Since HJK ceased their activity in other sports during the 1960s and 1970s the rivalry faded away on a large scale and in recent decades many even supported both clubs at the same time, HJK in football and HIFK in ice hockey. However, due to the rise of the Finnish supporter scene in the 2000s, there is a high tension between the most vocal supporters.

HJK shared a short but fierce rivalry with FC Jokerit around the late 1990s and the early 2000s. Jokerit were well supported due to their popular ice hockey section and the clubs also competed against each other in ice hockey in the late 1960s and the early 1970s.

Multiple Helsinki based clubs have played in the league but due to their short term visits and relatively low support base large scale rivalries were never born. Some notable clubs were Ponnistus, FinnPa, Pallo-Pojat and Helsingin Toverit.

=== Helsinki-Lahti rivalry ===
HJK has competed against Lahti based clubs from the 1960s, between 1964 and 1980 HJK and Lahden Reipas had a minor rivalry as both clubs gained good success winning some titles and were also generally well supported. Reipas also won seven cup titles against one of HJK. Reipas was relegated after 1980 season. More notable rivalry was against Kuusysi from the early 1980s to the mid-1990s. Between 1981 and 1992 HJK won six league titles against Kuusysi's five, both clubs also won the cup twice, facing two times in the finals (which were both won by HJK). Both clubs also performed well in the European competitions. In 1996 both the Lahti clubs merged and FC Lahti was born, HJK and FC Lahti matches are more known from outside pitch activities, some crowd disturbances and small fights have occurred which otherwise are rare in Finnish football. Due to a relatively short distance between the two cities, these matches often draw more notable away support than others.

=== HJK-Haka rivalry ===
HJK and Valkeakosken Haka are the two most successful clubs in Finnish football, HJK with 27 league and 12 cup titles and Haka with 9 league and 12 cup titles. The match is also considered as "urban vs. rural" rivalry as HJK is a club from Finland's biggest city Helsinki and Haka is representing the small town of Valkeakoski.

On 1 October 2012, in a Veikkausliiga match at the Tehtaan kenttä, Valkeakoski, Haka and HJK drew 2–2 after scandalous events. When Haka was leading the match 2–0, HJK was given a throw-in. Two HJK players threw two balls in at the same time in different places, and the referee let the game continue with two balls on the field. Seconds later, Juho Mäkelä scored a goal for HJK with the ball which was thrown-in further up the pitch. The goal was granted and shortly after HJK equalized the game. At the end of the season, HJK won their 18th Finnish championship title, and Haka were relegated to second-tier Ykkönen, after 15 consecutive seasons in the Veikkausliiga.

== Stadiums ==
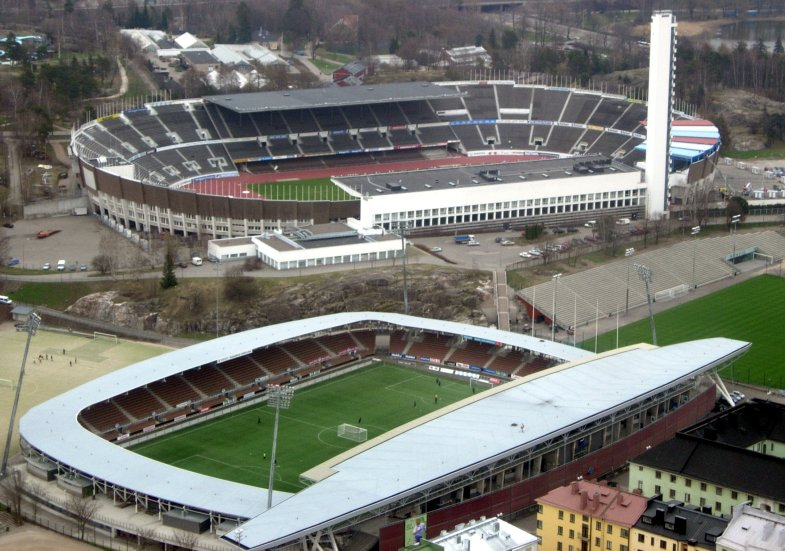
Stadiums in Töölö in 2005: Helsinki Olympic Stadium before the renovation (above), Töölö Football Stadium (front) and Töölön Pallokenttä (right)

The club's current home stadium is Töölö Football Stadium, located in Töölö neighbourhood in Helsinki, where HJK has played their home matches since its completion in 2000. Initially the stadium had natural grass pitch, but in 2003 the surface was changed to artificial turf.

During their first years in 1907–1908, HJK played at the Kaisaniemen kenttä, and in 1909–1914 at the Eläintarha Stadium. HJK's first official home ground was Töölön Pallokenttä where they played in 1915–1998. During the Veikkausliiga era, HJK played their home matches occasionally also at the Helsinki Olympic Stadium.

=== Home grounds ===
- Kaisaniemen kenttä: 1907–1908
- Eläintarha Stadium: 1909–1914
- Töölön Pallokenttä: 1915–1998
- Helsinki Olympic Stadium: 1939–2000
- Töölö Football Stadium: 2000–present

=== Attendances ===
HJK reached their highest average attendance record in the 1969 Mestaruussarja-season with 8,058 spectators, when the club was playing at Töölön Pallokenttä.

HJK's average league attendance
Season	Avg. attendance
2010	3,464
2011	3,610
2012	3,744
2013	5,098
2014	4,017
2015	5,281
2016	5,101
2017	4,779
2018	3,779
2019	5,007
2020	2,117 (Note: The season interrupted by the COVID-19 pandemic)
2021	1,530 (Note: Attendance limitations due to COVID-19 pandemic)
2022	4,002
2023	5,631
2024	6,363 (Note: The highest average attendance in Bolt Arena-era since 2000.)
2025	6,223

HJK's average league attendance over a ten-year interval
Season	Avg. attendance	Ten-year change
1950–1959	2,372	—N/a
1960–1969	5,099	+114,97% ▲
1970–1979	3,365	—34% ▼
1980–1989	4,501	+33,76% ▲
1990–1999	3,528	—21,62% ▼
2000–2009	4,099	+16,18% ▲
2010–2019	4,397	+7,27% ▲

== Transfers ==
HJK Helsinki has produced a large number of players who have gone on to represent the Finland national team. Over the years, HJK has also provided the most probable way for transfers abroad in Finland for Finnish and international players. In August 2011, HJK sold Teemu Pukki to a German Bundesliga club Schalke 04 for €1.8 million, which wass the record transfer fee in Veikkausliiga until 2026. Besides Pukki, also Joel Pohjanpalo, Alexander Ring, Jukka Raitala, Dawda Bah and Luka Hyryläinen transferred to Bundesliga clubs from HJK.

=== Record transfers ===
Rank	Player	To	Fee	Year
1.	(Finland) Teemu Pukki	(Germany) Schalke 04	€1.8 million	2011
2.	(Finland) Joel Pohjanpalo	(Germany) Bayer Leverkusen	€1.5 million	2014
3.	(Serbia) Bojan Radulović	(England) Huddersfield Town	€1.4 million	2024
4.	(Colombia) Alfredo Morelos	(Scotland) Rangers	€1.2 million	2017
5.	(Finland) Topi Keskinen	(Scotland) Aberdeen	€1.0 million	2024
6.	(Finland) Sakari Mattila	(Italy) Udinese	€800,000	2009
6.	(Finland) Janne Saarinen	(Norway) Rosenborg	€800,000	2001
8.	(Finland) Juho Mäkelä	(Scotland) Hearts	€730,000	2006
9.	(Finland) Lassi Lappalainen	(Italy) Bologna	€700,000	2019
10.	(Finland) Juhani Ojala	(Switzerland) Young Boys	€600,000	2011
11.	(Finland) Aapo Halme	(England) Leeds United	€560,000	2018
12.	(Finland) Paulus Roiha	(Netherlands) Utrecht	€500,000	2002
12.	(Finland) Mika Kottila	(Norway) Brann	€500,000	1999
12.	(Finland) Alexander Ring	(Germany) FC Kaiserslautern	€500,000	2013
15.	(Finland) Perparim Hetemaj	(Greece) AEK Athens	€450,000	2006

== Players ==
=== First team squad ===
As of 3 October 2026

Note: Flags indicate national team as defined under FIFA eligibility rules; some limited exceptions apply. Players may hold more than one non-FIFA nationality.

No.	Pos.	Nation	Player
1	GK	FIN	Jesse Öst
3	DF	FRA	Till Cissokho
4	MF	FIN	Alexander Ring
6	DF	FIN	Ville Tikkanen
7	MF	ENG	Alfie Cicale
8	MF	FIN	Pyry Mentu
9	FW	DEN	Mads Borchers
10	MF	FIN	Lucas Lingman
11	MF	FIN	Martin Kirilov
12	GK	FIN	Mitja Haapanen
13	DF	FIN	Kaius Simojoki
14	DF	DEN	Leonel Montano (on loan from Silkeborg)
15	MF	FIN	Jere Kallinen
16	MF	FIN	Antton Nylund
17	DF	FIN	Nikolai Alho

No.	Pos.	Nation	Player
19	FW	FIN	David Ezeh
20	FW	FIN	Teemu Pukki
22	MF	FIN	Liam Möller
24	DF	FIN	Emil Leveälahti
26	FW	FIN	Lassi Lappalainen
29	FW	FIN	Santeri Haarala
30	GK	FIN	Jasper Samooja (on loan from Lecce)
31	DF	SRB	Mihailo Bogićević
32	MF	SEN	Mouhamed Guèye
33	GK	FIN	Osku Maukonen
35	DF	FIN	Eemil Toivonen
44	GK	CRO	Matej Marković
77	MF	FIN	Joona Veteli
91	FW	FIN	Roni Hudd

=== Out on loan ===
Note: Flags indicate national team as defined under FIFA eligibility rules; some limited exceptions apply. Players may hold more than one non-FIFA nationality.

No.	Pos.	Nation	Player
28	DF	FIN	Miska Ylitolva (at Kalmar FF until 31 December 2026)

== Reserve team ==
HJK's reserve team Klubi 04 currently plays in the Ykkösliiga, Finnish second tier.

=== Klubi 04 squad ===
As of 19 January 2026

Note: Flags indicate national team as defined under FIFA eligibility rules; some limited exceptions apply. Players may hold more than one non-FIFA nationality.

No.	Pos.	Nation	Player
45	DF	FIN	Lukas Kuusisto
48	FW	NGR	Francis Etu
51	FW	FIN	Kaius Hardén
62	DF	SWE	Nils Svensson
76	GK	FIN	Vilho Tuokkola
98	DF	FIN	Alex Lietsa
—	MF	FIN	Otto Hannula
—	FW	KOS	Art Berisha

No.	Pos.	Nation	Player
—	GK	FIN	Mustafa Abdulmuttaleb
—	DF	FIN	Jere Kari
—	MF	FIN	Marlo Hyvönen
—	FW	FIN	Emil Ingman
—	DF	FIN	Arop Ring
—	FW	AUS	Liam Rippon
—	MF	SWE	Hadi Noori

=== Out on loan ===
Note: Flags indicate national team as defined under FIFA eligibility rules; some limited exceptions apply. Players may hold more than one non-FIFA nationality.

No.	Pos.	Nation	Player
—	FW	FIN	Salem Bouajila (at SV Ried II until 30 June 2025)

== Management and boardroom ==
=== Coaching staff ===
Updated 22 April 2026

Name	Role
(Finland) Joonas Rantanen	Manager
(Finland) Aleksi Lalli	Interim manager
(Finland) Erkka V. Lehtola	Assistant coach
(Spain) Edgar Reina	Coach, Analyst
(Finland) Ville Wallén	Goalkeeping coach, Team Manager
(Finland) Joni Ruuskanen	Conditioning coach
(Hungary) Tamás Gruborovics	Mental coach
(Finland) Lasse Lagerblom	Physiotherapist
(Finland) Matias Kalliokoski	Physiotherapist
(Finland) / (Chile) Boris Wistuba-Marino	Kit manager
(Finland) Petteri Jutila	Kit manager

=== Performance Unit ===
Also with Women's team and Reserve team. Updated 24 April 2025

Name	Role
(Finland) Risto-Matti Toivonen	Head of sports science
(Finland) Joni Ruuskanen	Conditioning coach
(Finland) Toni Taipale	Physiotherapist
(Finland) Tony Elomaa	Physiotherapist
(Finland) Tuomas Brinck	Doctor
(Finland) Klaus Köhler	Doctor

=== Boardroom ===
Updated 20 May 2024

Name	Role
(Finland) Aki Riihilahti	CEO
(Finland) Sirja Luomaniemi	Commercial Director
(Finland) Petri Vuorinen	Sporting Director

== Managers and captains ==
=== Managers ===
Name	Year(s)
(Finland) Yrjö Larha	1933–1944
(Finland) Eino Nuutinen	1945–1947
(England) George Duke	1948–1949
(Finland) Eino Nuutinen	1950
(Hungary) János Nagy	1951
(Finland) Eino Nuutinen	1952
(Finland) Niilo Nordman	1953–1955
(Finland) Aatos Lehtonen	1956–1958
(Finland) Aulis Rytkönen	1960–1971
(Finland) Raimo Kauppinen	1 January 1972 – 1974
(Finland) Kai Pahlman	1973–1974
(Finland) Aulis Rytkönen	1 July 1975 – 1979
(Finland) Raimo Kauppinen	1975–31 December 1979
(Finland) Martti Kuusela	1 January 1980 – 31 December 1981
(Finland) Raimo Kauppinen	1 January 1981 – 1982
(Finland) Thure Sarnola	1982
(Finland) Miikka Toivola	1983–1984
(Finland) Jyrki Heliskoski	1 January 1985 – 31 December 1989
(Finland) Martti Kuusela	1 January 1990 – 31 December 1990
(Finland) Jyrki Nieminen	1 January 1991 – 31 December 1991
(Finland) Jari-Pekka Keurulainen	1 January 1992 – 31 December 1994
(Sweden) Bo Johansson	1 January 1995 – 31 December 1995
(Finland) Tommy Lindholm	1 January 1996 – 8 July 1996
(Finland) Jari-Pekka Keurulainen / (Finland) Martti Kuusela	8 July 1996 – 31 December 1996
(Finland) Antti Muurinen	1 January 1997 – 31 December 1999
(Finland) Jyrki Heliskoski	1 January 2000 – 31 December 2001
(England) (Finland) Keith Armstrong	1 January 2002 – 5 September 2007
(Finland) Aki Hyryläinen	6 September 2007 – 10 October 2007
(Finland) Antti Muurinen	10 October 2007 – 31 December 2012
(Finland) Sixten Boström	1 Jan 2013–28 April 2014
(Finland) Mika Lehkosuo	29 April 2014 – 22 May 2019
(Finland) Toni Koskela	22 May 2019 – 13 July 2023
(Finland) Toni Korkeakunnas	13 July 2023 – 31 December 2023
(Finland) Ossi Virta / (Spain) Ferran Sibila	1 January 2024 – 20 May 2024
(Finland) Toni Korkeakunnas	20 May 2024 – 4 May 2025
(Finland) Miika Nuutinen (interim)	4 May 2025 – 31 December 2025
(Finland) Joonas Rantanen	1 January 2026 – present

=== Captains ===
Name	Year(s)
(Finland) Jarkko Wiss	1997–1998
(Finland) Ville Nylund	2001–2006
(Finland) Mika Nurmela	2007
(Finland) Tuomas Aho	2008
(Finland) Tuomas Haapala	2009
(Finland) Ville Wallén	2010–2013
(Finland) Teemu Tainio	2014
(Finland) Markus Heikkinen	2015
(Finland) Sebastian Sorsa	2016
(Brazil) / (Finland) Rafinha	2017–2018
(Finland) Sebastian Dahlström	2019
(Finland) Nikolai Alho	2020
(Finland) Daniel O'Shaughnessy	2021
(Finland) Miro Tenho	2022–2023
(Finland) Joona Toivio	2024
(Finland) Daniel O'Shaughnessy	2025
(Finland) Alexander Ring	2026 – present

== Hall of Fame ==
The HJK Hall of Fame was established in 1997, when the club celebrated its 90th anniversary. Initially 16 people were named, after which it has been completed several times.

- 1. (Finland) Niilo Tammisalo
- 2. (Finland) Eino Soinio
- 3. (Finland) Aatos Lehtonen
- 4. (Finland) Reijo Jalava
- 5. (Finland) Kai Pahlman
- 6. (Finland) Aulis Rytkönen
- 7. (Finland) Paavo Heinonen
- 8. (Finland) Lauri Lehtinen
- 9. (Finland) Miikka Toivola
- 10. (Finland) Jari Europaeus
- 11. (Finland) Henry Forssell
- 12. (Finland) Juha Dahllund
- 13. (Finland) Pasi Rautiainen
- 14. (Finland) Jyrki Nieminen
- 15. (Finland) Hanna-Mari Sarlin
- 16. (Finland) Atik Ismail
- 17. (Finland) Markku Kanerva
- 18. (Finland) Markku Peltoniemi
- 19. (Finland) Jari Rantanen
- 20. (Finland) Kari Rissanen
- 21. (Finland) Aki Hyryläinen
- 22. (Finland) Tommi Grönlund
- 23. (Finland) Petri Helin
- 24. (Finland) Mika Lehkosuo
- 25. (Finland) Aarno Turpeinen
- 26. (Finland) Ville Nylund
- 27. (Finland) Christina Forssell
- 28. (Finland) Terhi Uusi-Luomalahti
- 29. (Finland) Markku Palmroos
- 30. (Finland) Aki Riihilahti
- 31. (Finland) Pasi Rasimus
- 32. (Finland) Kaija Salopuro
- 33. (Finland) Heidi Lindström
- 34. (Finland) Ville Wallén
- 35. (Finland) Mikael Forssell
- 36. (Finland) Sanna Malaska
- 37. (Finland) Sebastian Sorsa

== European record ==
=== UEFA club competition record ===
Updated 22 April 2026.

Competition	Pld	W	D	L	GF	GA
UEFA Champions League	85	31	14	40	109	132
UEFA Cup / UEFA Europa League	78	22	12	44	79	152
UEFA Cup Winners' Cup	12	6	1	5	18	24
UEFA Conference League	24	8	6	13	31	54
UEFA Intertoto Cup	4	1	2	1	6	6
Total	206	68	36	102	252	371

=== Matches ===
Season	Competition	Round	Opponent	Home	Away	Aggregate	Y/N
1965–66	European Cup	PR	(England) Manchester United	2–3	0–6	2–9	
1967–68	UEFA Cup Winners' Cup	1R	(Poland) Wisła Kraków	1–4	0–4	1–8	
1974–75	European Cup	1R	(Malta) Valletta	4–1	0–1	4–2	
1974–75	European Cup	2R	(Sweden) Åtvidabergs FF	0–3	0–1	0–4	
1975–76	UEFA Cup	PR	(Germany) Hertha Berlin	1–2	1–4	2–6	
1979–80	European Cup	1R	(Netherlands) Ajax Amsterdam	1–8	1–8	2–16	
1982–83	European Cup	1R	(Cyprus) Omonia	3–0	0–2	3–2	
1982–83	European Cup	2R	(England) Liverpool	1–0	0–5	1–5	
1983–84	UEFA Cup	1R	(Soviet Union) Spartak Moscow	0–5	0–2	0–7	
1984–85	UEFA Cup	PR	(Soviet Union) Dinamo Minsk	0–6	0–4	0–10	
1985–86	UEFA Cup Winners' Cup	1R	(Albania) Flamurtari	3–2	2–1	5–3	
1985–86	UEFA Cup Winners' Cup	2R	(East Germany) Dynamo Dresden	1–0	2–7	3–7	
1986–87	European Cup	1R	(Cyprus) APOEL	3–2	0–1	3–3 (a)	
1988–89	European Cup	1R	(Portugal) FC Porto	2–0	0–3	2–3	
1989–90	European Cup	1R	(Italy) A.C. Milan	0–1	0–4	0–5	
1991–92	European Cup	1R	(Soviet Union) Dynamo Kyiv	0–1	0–3	0–4	
1993–94	UEFA Champions League	PR	(Estonia) Norma Tallinn	1–1	1–0	2–1	
1993–94	UEFA Champions League	1R	(Belgium) Anderlecht	0–3	0–3	0–6	
1994–95	UEFA Cup Winners' Cup	PR	(Faroe Islands) B71 Sandur	2–0	5–0	7–0	
1994–95	UEFA Cup Winners' Cup	1R	(Turkey) Beşiktaş	1–1	0–2	1–3	
1995	UEFA Intertoto Cup	Group 5	(Sweden) IFK Norrköping	—N/a	1–1	3rd	
1995	UEFA Intertoto Cup	Group 5	(Republic of Ireland) Bohemians	3–2	—N/a	3rd	
1995	UEFA Intertoto Cup	Group 5	(Denmark) OB Odense	—N/a	1–2	3rd	
1995	UEFA Intertoto Cup	Group 5	(France) Bordeaux	1–1	—N/a	3rd	
1996–97	UEFA Cup	PR	(Armenia) Pyunik Yerevan	5–2 (aet)	1–3	6–5	
1996–97	UEFA Cup	QR	(Ukraine) Chernomorets Odesa	2–2	0–2	2–4	
1997–98	UEFA Cup Winners' Cup	QR	(Serbia and Montenegro) Red Star Belgrade	1–0	0–3	1–3	
1998–99	UEFA Champions League	1QR	(Armenia) FC Yerevan	2–0	3–0	5–0	
1998–99	UEFA Champions League	2QR	(France) FC Metz	1–0	1–1	2–1	
1998–99	UEFA Champions League	Group F	(Netherlands) PSV Eindhoven	1–3	1–2	4th	
1998–99	UEFA Champions League	Group F	(Germany) 1. FC Kaiserslautern	0–0	2–5	4th	
1998–99	UEFA Champions League	Group F	(Portugal) Benfica	2–0	2–2	4th	
1999–00	UEFA Cup	QR	(Armenia) Shirak Gyumri	2–0	0–1	2–1	
1999–00	UEFA Cup	1R	(France) Lyon	0–1	1–5	1–6	
2000–01	UEFA Cup	QR	(Luxembourg) CS Grevenmacher	4–1	0–2	4–3	
2000–01	UEFA Cup	1R	(Scotland) Celtic	2–1 (aet)	0–2	2–3	
2001–02	UEFA Cup	QR	(Latvia) FK Ventspils	2–1	1–0	3–1	
2001–02	UEFA Cup	1R	(Italy) Parma	0–2	0–1	0–3	
2002–03	UEFA Cup	QR	(Belarus) FC Gomel	0–4	0–1	0–5	
2003–04	UEFA Champions League	1QR	(Northern Ireland) Glentoran	1–0	0–0	1–0	
2003–04	UEFA Champions League	2QR	(Hungary) MTK Budapest	1–0	1–3	2–3	
2004–05	UEFA Champions League	1QR	(Northern Ireland) Linfield	1–0	1–0	2–0	
2004–05	UEFA Champions League	2QR	(Israel) Maccabi Tel Aviv	0–0	0–1	0–1	
2006–07	UEFA Cup	1QR	(Republic of Ireland) Drogheda United	1–1	1–3 (aet)	2–4	
2007–08	UEFA Cup	1QR	(Luxembourg) FC Etzella Ettelbruck	2–0	1–0	3–0	
2007–08	UEFA Cup	2QR	(Denmark) Aalborg BK	2–1	0–3	2–4	
2009–10	UEFA Europa League	2QR	(Lithuania) FK Vėtra	1–3	1–0	2–3	
2010–11	UEFA Champions League	2QR	(Lithuania) FK Ekranas	2–0 (aet)	0–1	2–1	
2010–11	UEFA Champions League	3QR	(Serbia) FK Partizan	1–2	0–3	1–5	
2010–11	UEFA Europa League	PO	(Turkey) Beşiktaş	0–4	0–2	0–6	
2011–12	UEFA Champions League	2QR	(Wales) Bangor City	10–0	3–0	13–0	
2011–12	UEFA Champions League	3QR	(Croatia) Dinamo Zagreb	1–2	0–1	1–3	
2011–12	UEFA Europa League	PO	(Germany) Schalke 04	2–0	1–6	3–6	
2012–13	UEFA Champions League	2QR	(Iceland) KR Reykjavik	7–0	2–1	9–1	
2012–13	UEFA Champions League	3QR	(Scotland) Celtic	0–2	1–2	1–4	
2012–13	UEFA Europa League	PO	(Spain) Athletic Bilbao	3–3	0–6	3–9	
2013–14	UEFA Champions League	2QR	(Estonia) Nõmme Kalju	0–0	1–2	1–2	
2014–15	UEFA Champions League	2QR	(North Macedonia) FK Rabotnički	2–1	0–0	2–1	
2014–15	UEFA Champions League	3QR	(Cyprus) APOEL	2–2	0–2	2–4	
2014–15	UEFA Europa League	PO	(Austria) SK Rapid Wien	2–1	3–3	5–4	
2014–15	UEFA Europa League	Group B	(Denmark) Copenhagen	2–1	0–2	3rd	
2014–15	UEFA Europa League	Group B	(Belgium) Club Brugge	0–3	1–2	3rd	
2014–15	UEFA Europa League	Group B	(Italy) Torino	2–1	0–2	3rd	
2015–16	UEFA Champions League	2QR	(Latvia) FK Ventspils	1–0	3–1	4–1	
2015–16	UEFA Champions League	3QR	(Kazakhstan) Astana	0–0	3–4	3–4	
2015–16	UEFA Europa League	PO	(Russia) Krasnodar	0–0	1–5	1–5	
2016–17	UEFA Europa League	1QR	(Lithuania) FK Atlantas	1–1	2–0	3–1	
2016–17	UEFA Europa League	2QR	(Bulgaria) Beroe Stara Zagora	1–0	1–1	2–1	
2016–17	UEFA Europa League	3QR	(Sweden) IFK Göteborg	0–2	2–1	2–3	
2017–18	UEFA Europa League	1QR	(Wales) Connah's Quay Nomads	3–0	0–1	3–1	
2017–18	UEFA Europa League	2QR	(North Macedonia) Shkëndija	1–1	1–3	2–4	
2018–19	UEFA Champions League	1QR	(Faroe Islands) Víkingur Gøta	3–1	2–1	5–2	
2018–19	UEFA Champions League	2QR	(Belarus) BATE Borisov	1–2	0–0	1–2	
2018–19	UEFA Europa League	3QR	(Slovenia) Olimpija Ljubljana	1–4	0–3	1–7	
2019–20	UEFA Champions League	1QR	(Faroe Islands) HB Tórshavn	3–0	2–2	5–2	
2019–20	UEFA Champions League	2QR	(Serbia) Red Star Belgrade	2–1	0–2	2–3	
2019–20	UEFA Europa League	3QR	(Latvia) Riga FC	2–2	1–1	3–3 (a)	
2021–22	UEFA Champions League	1QR	(Montenegro) Budućnost Podgorica	3–1	4–0	7–1	
2021–22	UEFA Champions League	2QR	(Sweden) Malmö FF	2–2	1–2	3–4	
2021–22	UEFA Europa League	3QR	(Azerbaijan) Neftçi Baku	3–0	2–2	5–2	
2021–22	UEFA Europa League	PO	(Turkey) Fenerbahçe	2–5	0–1	2–6	
2021–22	UEFA Europa Conference League	Group A	(Austria) LASK	0–2	0–3	3rd	
2021–22	UEFA Europa Conference League	Group A	(Armenia) Alashkert	1–0	4–2	3rd	
2021–22	UEFA Europa Conference League	Group A	(Israel) Maccabi Tel Aviv	0–5	0–3	3rd	
2022–23	UEFA Champions League	1QR	(Latvia) RFS	1–0	1–2 (a.e.t.)	2–2 (5–4 p)	
2022–23	UEFA Champions League	2QR	(Czech Republic) Viktoria Plzeň	1–2	0–5	1–7	
2022–23	UEFA Europa League	3QR	(Slovenia) Maribor	1–0	2–0	3–0	
2022–23	UEFA Europa League	PO	(Denmark) Silkeborg	1–0	1–1	2–1	
2022–23	UEFA Europa League	Group C	(Italy) AS Roma	1–2	0–3	4th	
2022–23	UEFA Europa League	Group C	(Bulgaria) Ludogorets Razgrad	1–1	0–2	4th	
2022–23	UEFA Europa League	Group C	(Spain) Real Betis	0–2	0–3	4th	
2023–24	UEFA Champions League	1QR	(Northern Ireland) Larne	1–0	2–2 (a.e.t.)	3–2	
2023–24	UEFA Champions League	2QR	(Norway) Molde	1–0	0–2	1–2	
2023–24	UEFA Europa League	3QR	(Azerbaijan) Qarabağ	1–2	1–2	2–4	
2023–24	UEFA Europa Conference League	PO	(Romania) Farul Constanța	2–0	1–2	3–2	
2023–24	UEFA Europa Conference League	Group G	(Germany) Eintracht Frankfurt	0–1	0–6	4th	
2023–24	UEFA Europa Conference League	Group G	(Greece) PAOK	2–3	2–4	4th	
2023–24	UEFA Europa Conference League	Group G	(Scotland) Aberdeen	2–2	1–1	4th	
2024–25	UEFA Champions League	1QR	(Lithuania) Panevėžys	1–1	0–3	1–4	
2024–25	UEFA Conference League	2QR	Bye	—N/a	—N/a	—N/a	
2024–25	UEFA Conference League	3QR	(Montenegro) Dečić	1–0	1–2 (a.e.t.)	2–2 (4–3 p)	
2024–25	UEFA Conference League	PO	(Faroe Islands) KÍ Klaksvík	2–1	2–2	4–3	
2024–25	UEFA Conference League	League	(Switzerland) Lugano	—N/a	0–3	30th	
2024–25	UEFA Conference League	League	(Belarus) Dinamo Minsk	1–0	—N/a	30th	
2024–25	UEFA Conference League	League	(Slovenia) Olimpija Ljubljana	0–2	—N/a	30th	
2024–25	UEFA Conference League	League	(Greece) Panathinaikos	—N/a	0–1	30th	
2024–25	UEFA Conference League	League	(Norway) Molde	2–2	—N/a	30th	
2024–25	UEFA Conference League	League	(Spain) Real Betis	—N/a	0–1	30th	
2025–26	UEFA Conference League	1QR	(Faroe Islands) NSÍ Runavík	5–0 (a.e.t.)	0–4	5–4	
2025–26	UEFA Conference League	2QR	(Bulgaria) Arda Kardzhali	2–2 (a.e.t.)	0–0	2–2 (3–4 p)	
2026–27	UEFA Conference League	2QR	(Northern Ireland) Coleraine	5–0	3–0	8−0	
2026–27	UEFA Conference League	3QR	(Scotland) Motherwell	1–1	0–2	1−3	
2027–28	UEFA Conference League	2QR					

=== UEFA coefficient ===
Correct as of 21 May 2025.

Rank	Team	Points
126	(Russia) Zenit Saint Petersburg	13.000
127	(Belgium) Cercle Brugge	12.750
128	(Finland) HJK Helsinki	12.500
129	(Portugal) Arouca	12.453
130	(Portugal) Gil Vicente	12.453
