= Hannu Takkula =

Finnish politician (born 1963)

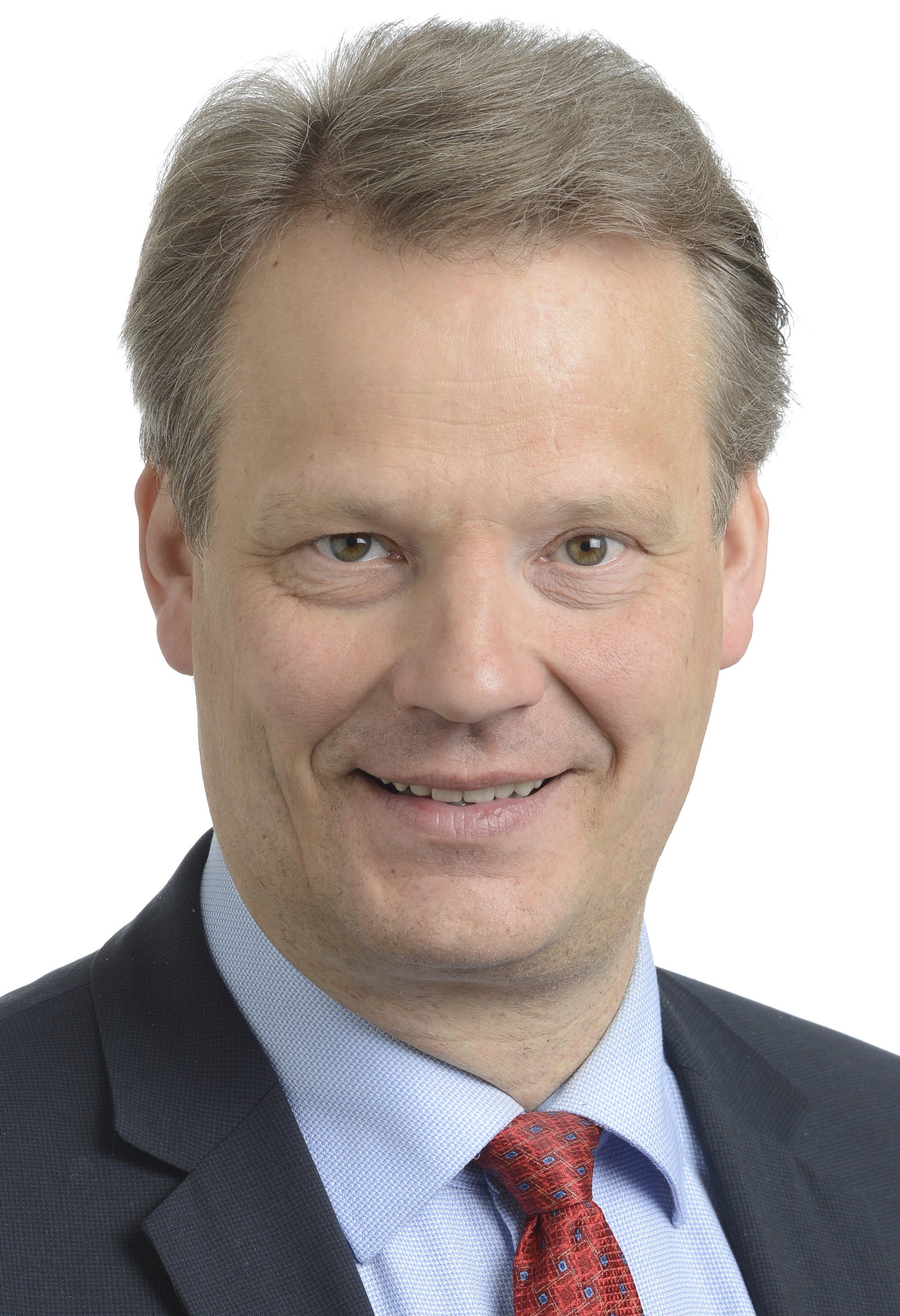

Member of the European Parliament
- In office 1 July 2004 – 28 February 2018
- Constituency: Finland

Member of the Finnish Parliament
- In office 24 March 1995 – 20 July 2004
- Constituency: Central Finland

Personal details
- Born: Hannu Aapa Takkula; 20 November 1963 (age 62) Ristijärvi, Finland
- Party: Finnish; Centre Party; EU; Alliance of Liberals and Democrats for Europe
- Education: Aalto University
- Website: www.hannutakkula.fi

Hannu Aapa Takkula (born 20 November 1963) is a Finnish politician and former Member of the European Parliament (MEP) from Finland. He is a member of the Centre Party, part of the Alliance of Liberals and Democrats for Europe.

== Early life ==
Takkula was raised in a Laestadianism family, which is a revivalist group within the Lutheran church. At the age of 15, his family was excommunicated because he played sports, and was allowed to watch television at school by his father who was the headmaster. Takkula and his siblings were also studying classical music, which is forbidden by Laestadianism. Disappointed he started a rock 'n' roll band. His parents became very worried and scared in the changes in their son. So his father researched schools for Takkula and chose a Seventh-day Adventist school in Toivonlinna. Takkula agreed to go to the school which was in southern Finland, to get away from his family in the north. Eventually he joined the Seventh-day Adventist Church.

Before attending university, Takkula studied music at the Tampere Conservatory and majored in singing. In 1993 he graduated with a Master of Education from the University of Lapland, going on to teach at Anetjärvi comprehensive school in 1992–1995. In 2016, Takkula completed his doctorate degree in the Faculty of Education of the University of Lapland.

== Political career ==
Takkula was elected to the Finnish Parliament in 1995 and acted as a member on the Education and Culture Committee, Environment Committee and Foreign Affairs Committee until 2004. In 2004 and 2009, Takkula was elected Member of the European Parliament.

In 2014 European Parliament election Takkula lost his seat, but returned later in 2015, when Olli Rehn resigned his seat after being elected to the Parliament of Finland. His work focuses mainly on the areas of International Trade, Agriculture, Education, Culture and Sports. He is a member of the ALDE group (Alliance of Liberals and Democrats for Europe) and the Centre Party of Finland, currently leading the Centre Party MEP delegation. Since 2008, Takkula has hosted the annual weeklong event Supporting Multilingualism through Language Assessment at the European Parliament together with Vice-President Miguel Angel Martínez.

In August 2017, the Finnish government appointed Takkula as the Finnish candidate to the European Court of Auditors. His term did begin in March 2018, while Takkula's seat in the European Parliament was taken by Elsi Katainen.

== Personal life ==
He is brother of Finnish football sporting director Miika Takkula, and cellist Heikki Takkula.

Takkula has authored books. He has two children and five grandchildren.

== Works ==
- Where Would You Find the Courage . Helsinki: Arkki, 2006. ISBN 951-618-803-6 .
- For the Future: Hearts from Europe . Helsinki: Image and Word, 2014. ISBN 978-951-585-288-5 .
