= Ville Nylund =

Finnish footballer (born 1972)

Personal information
- Full name: Kaj Wilhelm Nylund
- Date of birth: 14 August 1972 (age 54)
- Place of birth: Kokkola, Finland
- Height: 1.75 m (5 ft 9 in)
- Position: Right back

Youth career
- 1983–1991: OLS

Senior career*
| Years | Team | Apps | (Gls) |
| 1991 | OLS | 14 | (0) |
| 1992–1994 | FC Oulu | 61 | (1) |
| 1995–1996 | Jaro | 49 | (2) |
| 1997–2006 | HJK | 206 | (1) |

International career
| 1991–1992 | Finland U21 | 4 | (0) |
| 1996–2004 | Finland | 21 | (0) |
- * Club domestic league appearances and goals as of 14 May 2024

Ville Nylund (born 14 August 1972) is a Finnish former professional footballer, who played as a right back. He was capped 21 times for Finland national football team during 1996–2004.

== Career ==
Nylund started playing football with Oulun Luistinseura (OLS). He has also played for FC Oulu, FF Jaro and HJK Helsinki. While playing with HJK, Nylund won three Finnish championship titles, two Finnish Cups, and historically represented HJK in the 1998–99 UEFA Champions League group stage, the first time for a Finnish club in the UCL. Nylund served as the captain of HJK for several seasons.

He ended his professional playing career after the 2006 season, having made a total of 285 appearances in top-tier Veikkausliiga. In March 2008, he started working for the Finnish FA.

== Personal life ==
His son Antton Nylund is a footballer for HJK Klubi 04.

== Career statistics ==
=== Club ===
As of 1 September 2024.

Appearances and goals by club, season and competition
| Club | Season | League | | | Cup (Note: Includes Suomen Cup) | | Europe | | Total | |
| Club | Season | Division | Apps | Goals | Apps | Goals | Apps | Goals | Apps | Goals |
|---|---|---|---|---|---|---|---|---|---|---|
| OLS | 1991 | Kakkonen | 14 | 0 | – | | – | | 14 | 0 |
| FC Oulu | 1992 | Veikkausliiga | 14 | 0 | – | | – | | 14 | 0 |
| FC Oulu | 1992 | Ykkönen | 17 | 0 | – | | – | | 17 | 0 |
| FC Oulu | 1993 | Veikkausliiga | 26 | 0 | – | | – | | 26 | 0 |
| FC Oulu | Total | | 57 | 0 | 0 | 0 | 0 | 0 | 57 | 0 |
| Jaro | 1995 | Veikkausliiga | 23 | 2 | – | | – | | 23 | 2 |
| Jaro | 1996 | Veikkausliiga | 26 | 0 | – | | 4 (Note: Appearances in UEFA Intertoto Cup) | 0 | 30 | 0 |
| Jaro | Total | | 49 | 2 | 0 | 0 | 4 | 0 | 53 | 2 |
| HJK Helsinki | 1997 | Veikkausliiga | 24 | 0 | – | | 2 (Note: Appearances in UEFA Cup Winners' Cup) | 0 | 26 | 0 |
| HJK Helsinki | 1998 | Veikkausliiga | 21 | 0 | 1 | 0 | 10 (Note: Appearances in UEFA Champions League) | 0 | 32 | 0 |
| HJK Helsinki | 1999 | Veikkausliiga | 28 | 0 | – | | 4 (Note: Appearances in UEFA Cup) | 0 | 32 | 0 |
| HJK Helsinki | 2000 | Veikkausliiga | 25 | 0 | 1 | 0 | 4 | 0 | 30 | 0 |
| HJK Helsinki | 2001 | Veikkausliiga | 23 | 1 | – | | 2 | 0 | 25 | 1 |
| HJK Helsinki | 2002 | Veikkausliiga | 26 | 0 | – | | 2 | 0 | 28 | 0 |
| HJK Helsinki | 2003 | Veikkausliiga | 22 | 0 | 1 | 0 | 3 | 0 | 26 | 0 |
| HJK Helsinki | 2004 | Veikkausliiga | 18 | 0 | – | | 4 | 0 | 22 | 0 |
| HJK Helsinki | 2005 | Veikkausliiga | 18 | 0 | – | | – | | 18 | 0 |
| HJK Helsinki | 2006 | Veikkausliiga | 1 | 0 | – | | – | | 1 | 0 |
| HJK Helsinki | Total | | 206 | 1 | 3 | 0 | 31 | 0 | 240 | 1 |
| Klubi 04 | 2006 | Ykkönen | 4 | 0 | – | | – | | 4 | 0 |
| Career total | | | 330 | 3 | 3 | 0 | 35 | 0 | 368 | 3 |

=== International ===
As of match played 21 March 2024

Finland
| Year | Apps | Goals |
|---|---|---|
| 1996 | 1 | 0 |
| 1997 | 0 | 0 |
| 1998 | 0 | 0 |
| 1999 | 2 | 0 |
| 2000 | 5 | 0 |
| 2001 | 6 | 0 |
| 2002 | 1 | 0 |
| 2003 | 4 | 0 |
| 2004 | 2 | 0 |
| Total | 21 | 0 |

== Honours ==
HJK

- Veikkausliiga: 1997, 2002, 2003
- Finnish Cup: 2000, 2003
