= Joni Ruuskanen =

Finnish football coach (born 1988)

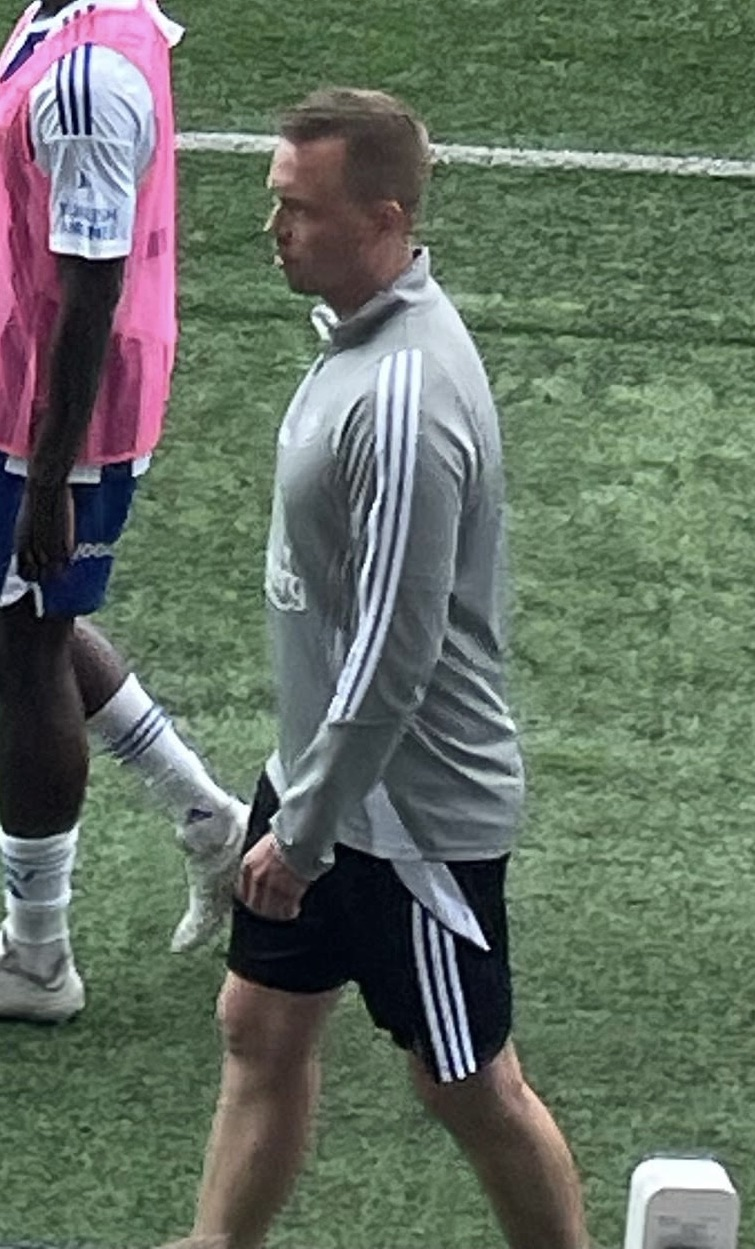
- Ruuskanen with HJK in 2024

Personal information
- Date of birth: 2 February 1988 (age 38)
- Place of birth: Anjalankoski, Finland
- Height: 1.85 m (6 ft 1 in)
- Position: Winger

Team information
- Current team: HJK Helsinki (conditioning coach)

Youth career
- Purha
- KTP
- KooTeePee

Senior career*
| Years | Team | Apps | (Gls) |
| 2005–2009 | KooTeePee | 23 | (0) |
| 2010–2011 | KTP | 13 | (1) |
| 2012 | PEPO | | |
| 2013 | Kotkan Jäntevä | 5 | (6) |
| 2014–2016 | PeKa | 5 | (3) |
| 2017 | KTP | 4 | (0) |

Managerial career
- KäPa (conditioning coach)
- 2021–: Finland (conditioning coach)
- 2024–: HJK (conditioning coach)
- * Club domestic league appearances and goals as of 20 May 2024

Joni Ruuskanen (born 2 February 1988) is a Finnish football coach and a former player who played as a forward or winger. He is currently working as a conditioning coach of Veikkausliiga club HJK Helsinki and the Finland national team. As a player, Ruuskanen made 15 appearances in Veikkausliiga for KooTeePee in 2006–2008.

Since 2019, Ruuskanen has also worked for Football Association of Finland responsible for conditioning coaching.
