= Ville Wallén =

Finnish footballer (born 1976)

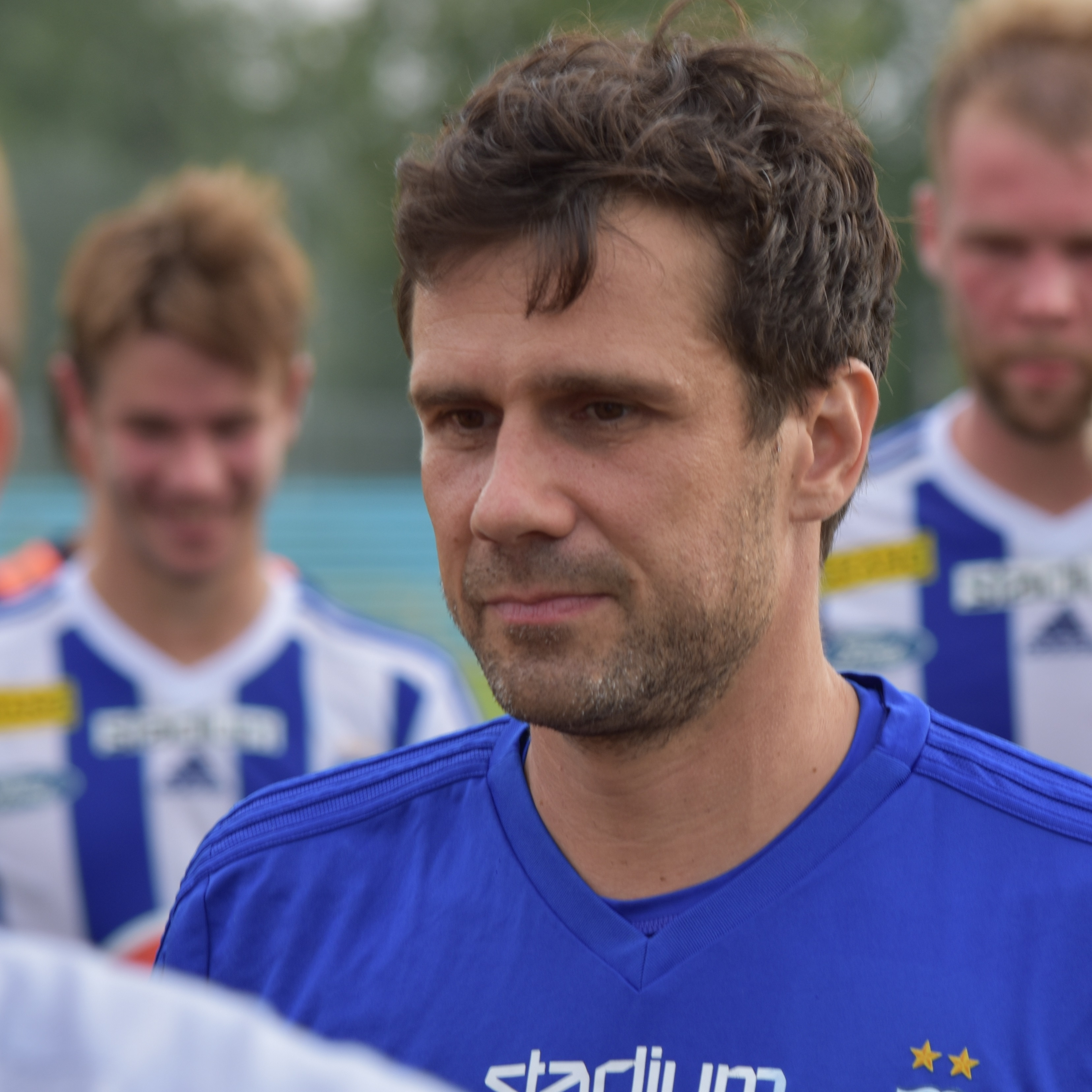
- Wallén with HJK in 2018.

Personal information
- Date of birth: 20 June 1976 (age 50)
- Place of birth: Helsinki, Finland
- Height: 1.83 m (6 ft 0 in)
- Position: Goalkeeper

Team information
- Current team: HJK (goalkeeping coach)

Youth career
- JU-58
- Kasiysi
- VanPa Vantaa
- Honka

Senior career*
Years	Team	Apps	(Gls)
2000–2002	HJK	18	(0)
2002	→ Lahti (loan)	8	(0)
2002	Jokerit	11	(0)
2003–2013	HJK	244	(0)
2004	→ RoPS (loan)	18	(0)

Managerial career
- 2015–: HJK (gk coach)
- * Club domestic league appearances and goals as of 1 September 2011

Ville Wallén (born 20 June 1976) is a Finnish football coach and a retired Finnish footballer who played as a goalkeeper. After his retirement as a player in 2013, he became the goalkeeping coach of HJK Helsinki.

== Honours ==
HJK

- Veikkausliiga (7): 2003, 2009, 2010, 2011, 2012, 2013, 2014
- Finnish Cup (5): 2000, 2003, 2006, 2008, 2011

Individual

- Veikkausliiga Goalkeeper of the Year: 2011
