= Finland national under-17 football team =

National under-17 football team representing Finland

Finland U-17
- Association: Football Association of Finland
- Confederation: UEFA (Europe)
- Head coach: (Finland) Erkka V. Lehtola
- FIFA code: FIN
First colours	Second colours

First international
- Finland 2–1 China (Helsinki, Finland; 13 August 2003)

Biggest win
- Liechtenstein 0–8 Finland (Oeiras, Portugal; 19 November 2024)

Biggest defeat
- Colombia 9–1 Finland (Helsinki, Finland; 19 August 2003)

World Cup
- Appearances: 1 (first in 2003)
- Best result: Group Stage (2003)

European Championship
- Appearances: 1 (first in 2002)
- Best result: Group Stage (2002)

The Finland national under-17 football team represents Finland in international football competitions in the FIFA U-17 World Cup and the UEFA European Under-17 Championship, as well as any other under-17 international football tournaments. It is governed by the Football Association of Finland.

== Competitive record ==
=== FIFA U-16/17 World Cup Record ===
Year	Round	Position	Matches	Wins	Draws	Losses	GF (Note: Goals for / scored)	GA (Note: Goals against / conceded)
(China) 1985	did not qualify							
(Canada) 1987	did not qualify							
(Scotland) 1989	did not qualify							
(Italy) 1991	did not qualify							
(Japan) 1993	did not qualify							
(Ecuador) 1995	did not qualify							
(Egypt) 1997	did not qualify							
(New Zealand) 1999	did not qualify							
(Trinidad and Tobago) 2001	did not qualify							
(Finland) 2003	Group Stage	12th	3	1	0	2	3	12
(Peru) 2005	did not qualify							
(South Korea) 2007	did not qualify							
(Nigeria) 2009	did not qualify							
(Mexico) 2011	did not qualify							
(United Arab Emirates) 2013	did not qualify							
(Chile) 2015	did not qualify							
(India) 2017	did not qualify							
(Brazil) 2019	did not qualify							
(Indonesia) 2023	did not qualify							
(Qatar) 2025	did not qualify							
(Qatar) 2026	did not qualify							
Total	1/21	12th	3	1	0	2	3	12

=== UEFA European U-17 Championship record ===
Year	Round	Pld	W	D*	L	GF	GA
1982-2001	See Finland national under-16 football team						
(Denmark) 2002	Group Stage	3	0	0	3	3	15
(Portugal) 2003	did not qualify						
(France) 2004	did not qualify						
(Italy) 2005	did not qualify						
(Luxembourg) 2006	did not qualify						
(Belgium) 2007	did not qualify						
(Turkey) 2008	did not qualify						
(Germany) 2009	did not qualify						
(Liechtenstein) 2010	did not qualify						
(Serbia) 2011	did not qualify						
(Slovenia) 2012	did not qualify						
(Slovakia) 2013	did not qualify						
(Malta) 2014	did not qualify						
(Bulgaria) 2015	did not qualify						
(Azerbaijan) 2016	did not qualify						
(Croatia) 2017	did not qualify						
(England) 2018	did not qualify						
(Republic of Ireland) 2019	did not qualify						
(Estonia) 2020	Cancelled due to COVID-19 pandemic						
(Cyprus) 2021	Cancelled due to COVID-19 pandemic						
(Israel) 2022	did not qualify						
(Hungary) 2023	did not qualify						
(Cyprus) 2024	did not qualify						
(Albania) 2025	did not qualify						
(Estonia) 2026	did not qualify						
(Latvia) 2027	Future event						
Total	1/24	3	0	0	3	3	15

*Draws include knockout matches decided on penalty kicks.
**Gold background colour indicates that the tournament was won.
***Red border colour indicates tournament was held on home soil.

== Players ==
=== Current squad ===
The following players were called up for the most recent 2026 UEFA European Under-17 Championship qualification matches.

No.	Pos.	Player	Date of birth (age)	Club
12	GK	Dan Lauri	17 July 2009 (age 17)	(Football Association of Finland) TPS
1	GK	Elias Lahti	9 January 2009 (age 17)	(German Football Association) Hamburg
4	DF	Niilo Tarvajärvi	18 June 2009 (age 17)	(Royal Dutch Football Association) Ajax
5	DF	Miguel Yinkfu Chuye	17 May 2010 (age 16)	(Football Association of Finland) IF Gnistan
14	DF	Aamos Oinas	11 July 2009 (age 17)	(Football Association of Finland) RoPS
17	DF	Ruben Barrett	4 August 2009 (age 17)	(Football Association of Finland) HJK
3	DF	Samuel Heikari	1 June 2009 (age 17)	(Football Association of Finland) IF Gnistan
21	DF	Dion Zaberxha	19 October 2009 (age 17)	(Football Association of Finland) HJK
22	DF	Niilo Kyllönen	5 August 2009 (age 17)	(Football Association of Finland) Ilves
6	MF	Paavo Aalto	22 April 2009 (age 17)	(Football Association of Finland) Inter Turku
8	MF	Juuso Mäkeläinen	27 January 2009 (age 17)	(Football Association of Finland) AC Oulu
16	MF	Jeff Selenge	7 November 2009 (age 17)	(Football Association of Finland) IF Gnistan
19	MF	Nestori Meltoranta	10 July 2009 (age 17)	(Football Association of Finland) Inter Turku
2	MF	Nicklas Kroupkin	19 July 2009 (age 17)	(Football Association of Finland) HJK
15	MF	Veikko Karppinen	23 May 2009 (age 17)	(Football Association of Finland) Honka
11	FW	Toivo Koivuranta	14 December 2009 (age 16)	(Football Association of Finland) KäPa
7	FW	Lucas Helander	14 August 2009 (age 17)	(Football Association of Finland) Ekenäs IF
20	FW	Rasmus Rautavirta	13 May 2009 (age 17)	(Football Association of Finland) Ilves
9	FW	Jay De Nascimento	3 January 2009 (age 17)	(Football Association of Finland) HJK
10	FW	Rasmus Mendolin	9 April 2009 (age 17)	(Football Association of Finland) Inter Turku

== Coaching staff ==
- Head coach: Erkka V. Lehtola
- Coach: Teemu Eskola
- Goalkeeping Coach: Eemeli Reponen
- Video Analyst: Juho Suuperko
- Doctor: Aapo Haavisto
- Physiotherapist: Niklas Virtanen
- Kit Manager: Jaakko Tawast
- Team Manager: Ville Sairanen

== Head-to-head record ==
The following table shows Finland's head-to-head record in the FIFA U-17 World Cup.

Opponent	Pld	W	D	L	GF	GA	GD	Win %
China	1	1	0	0	2	1	+1	100.00
Colombia	1	0	0	1	1	9	−8	0.00
Mexico	1	0	0	1	0	2	−2	0.00
Total	3	1	0	2	3	12	−9	33.33

=== Minor tournaments ===
- Under-17 Baltic Cup
  - Winners: 2011, 2013
  - Runners-up: 2015, 2016, 2017, 2018
  - Third-place: 2012, 2014
- Nordic Under-17 Football Championship
  - Winners: 1999, 2013
  - Runners-up: 1975, 2018
  - Third-place: 1982, 1986, 1992, 1996, 2000, 2006

== See also ==
- Finland men's national football team
- Finland men's national under-21 football team
- Finland men's national under-19 football team
- Finland men's national under-18 football team
- Finland men's national under-16 football team
- Finland women's national football team
- Finland women's national under-20 football team
- Finland women's national under-17 football team
