= Miika Takkula =

Finnish sporting director and former footballer, born 1983

Personal information
- Date of birth: 17 April 1983 (age 43)
- Place of birth: Kiiminki, Finland
- Position: Midfielder

Team information
- Current team: AIK (head of scouting and recruitment)

Senior career*
Years	Team	Apps	(Gls)
2001–2002	Tervarit	12	(0)
2002	→ KajHa (loan)	7	(0)
2003–2004	AC Oulu	40	(0)
2005	Inter Turku	0	(0)
2005	→ VG-62 (loan)	20	(0)
2006–2007	AC Oulu	12	(1)
2006	→ OLS (loan)	3	(0)
2007	→ OPS (loan)	2	(0)

Managerial career
- 2019–2023: HJK (sporting director)
- 2023–2025: Ilves (sporting director)
- 2026–: AIK (head of recruitment)
- * Club domestic league appearances and goals

Miika Takkula (born 17 April 1983) is a Finnish sporting director and former footballer who played as a midfielder. He is currently serving as the head of scouting and recruitment of Allsvenskan club AIK

== Playing career ==
During his playing career, Takkula played in Finland for his hometown clubs Tervarit and AC Oulu in Ykkönen and in Kakkonen. He had also loan stints with Kajaanin Haka, VG-62, Oulun Luistinseura and Oulun Palloseura. He ended his playing career after the 2007 season due to injuries.

== Career ==
After his retirement as a player, Takkula started to work in HJK Helsinki organisation in 2008. He started in an after-school day care arranged by the club. He worked with youth teams, as a youth coach and as an academy coach, and additionally in other positions in the club. In 2013, he was named the coaching director of the club's youth sector. In 2018–2019, he spent eight months in Australia working in a local academy of AC Milan.

In July 2019, Takkula returned to Finland and was named the sporting director of HJK first team in Veikkausliiga. During his four-year spell in HJK, the club won three Finnish Championship titles in a row and qualified to the group stages of European competitions in three consecutive seasons.

In the middle of the 2023 season, it was announced that Takkula departed HJK and was named the sporting director of fellow Veikkausliiga side Ilves. Takkula had worked in different roles in HJK for a total of 15 years before his departure. At the end of the 2024 season, the Ilves first team built by Takkula, finished as the Veikkausliiga runners-up, falling two points short to KuPS.

In December 2025, Takkula was named the head of scouting and recruitment of Allsvenskan club AIK.

== Personal life ==
He is the brother of Finnish politician and former MEP Hannu Takkula, and cellist Heikki Takkula.
