= Erkka V. Lehtola =

Finnish football manager (born 1972)

Personal information
- Full name: Erkka Viktor Lehtola
- Date of birth: 23 January 1972 (age 54)
- Place of birth: Helsinki, Finland
- Height: 1.87 m (6 ft 2 in)
- Position: Forward

Team information
- Current team: HJK (assistant)

Youth career
- Jupperin Urheilijat-58
- 1981–1991: HJK

Senior career*
Years	Team	Apps	(Gls)
1992	HIFK	13	(2)
1993–1994	Vantaan Pallo-70	11	(8)
1994–1996	Honka	26	(24)
1996–1998	HJK	35	(5)
1997–1998	→ Honka (loan)	9	(2)
1999	HIFK	14	(2)
1999	→ KäPa (loan)	1	(2)
2000–2001	Atlantis	29	(6)
2002	AC Allianssi	21	(3)
2002	→ AC Vantaa (loan)	1	(0)
2003	Atlantis	7	(1)
2003	TuPS		

Managerial career
- 2004–2005: FC Espoo
- 2013: Gnistan
- 2016–2017: Finland U16
- 2017–2025: Finland U17
- 2026–: HJK (assistant)
- * Club domestic league appearances and goals as of 21 February 2024

Erkka Viktor Lehtola (born 23 January 1972) is a Finnish football manager and a former player who played as a forward. He is currently working as an assistant coach of HJK Helsinki.

== Playing career ==
After playing in the HJK Helsinki youth sector, Lehtola played for various clubs in the Greater Helsinki area. He won the Finnish championship title with HJK in 1997, and the 1998 Finnish Cup. He was also part of the HJK squad that historically qualified for the UEFA Champions League group stage in 1998–99.

== Managerial career ==
After retiring as a player, Lehtola has managed FC Espoo and IF Gnistan. He has also worked as a youth coach for Finnish FA, Uusimaa area and HJK, and as a coaching director of HJK youth sector. Since 2017, Lehtola is a head coach of Finland U17 national team.

== Personal life ==
Lehtola is a regular football pundit for Yle during international tournaments.

He has publicly campaigned against the nicotine use in sports. Lehtola has also criticized the previous "Fair Play - Kaikki pelaa" system of Finnish FA.

== Honours ==
as a player
HJK

- Veikkausliiga: 1997
- Finnish Cup: 1998

Atlantis

- Finnish Cup: 2001
