= Heidi Lindström =

Finnish footballer (born 1981)

Personal information
- Date of birth: 30 November 1981 (age 44)
- Position: Midfielder

Senior career*
Years	Team	Apps	(Gls)
1997-2011	HJK		
2012-2013	Honka		
2014–2015	HJK		

International career
	Finland	21	(0)
- * Club domestic league appearances and goals

Heidi Lindström (born 30 November 1981) is a retired Finnish footballer. Lindstrom spend most of her career at HJK. During Lindstrom's career she won 6 Kansallinen Liiga titles. Since retiring Lindstrom became a youth coach for HJK. She also took up playing handball for Sparta.

== International career ==
Lindström was part of the Finnish team at the 2005 European Championships.
