= Martti Kuusela =

Finnish footballer and manager (born 1945)

Personal information
- Full name: Martti Kuusela
- Date of birth: 9 October 1945 (age 81)
- Place of birth: Rovaniemi, Finland
- Position: Midfielder

Senior career*
Years	Team	Apps	(Gls)
1963–1964	RoPS	?	(4)
1967	OTP	?	(11)
1965–1968	MP	?	(20)
1969–1971	HIFK	?	(7)
1972	HJK	21	(3)
1973–1974	Haka	43	(8)
1975–1976	FC Ilves	?	(4)
1977–1978	FinnPa	?	(4)
Total		64+	(61)

International career
1972–1973	Finland	2	(0)

Managerial career
- 1979: GrIFK
- 1980–1981: HJK Helsinki
- 1982–1987: Finland
- 1989: B 1903
- 1990: HJK Helsinki
- 1991: Beerschot
- 1992–1994: Budapest Honvéd
- 1994–1995: Proodeftiki
- 1995–1996: Apollon Limassol
- 1997: FinnPa
- 2000–2001: Panionios
- 2005: Aris
- 2008: TPS Turku
- * Club domestic league appearances and goals

Martti Kuusela (born 9 October 1945) is a Finnish football manager and former midfielder.

Kuusela enjoyed a moderately successful career as a player in Finland. As a coach, he won the Finnish championship in 1981 and 1990 with HJK Helsinki. He was the head coach of the Finland national team from 1982 to 1987, helping the team to the brink of qualifying for the 1986 World Cup.

Kuusela has worked as coach in Belgium, Greece, Cyprus, Denmark and Hungary. He led Budapest Honvéd FC to the Hungarian championship in 1993. Kuusela coached Aris Thessaloniki F.C. in Greece in 2005. On 15 January 2008, TPS announced they had appointed Kuusela as their new manager. He took the reins at TPS when the previous manager Mixu Paatelainen left the club to become manager of Scottish club Hibernian. Kuusela was sacked by TPS in September 2008, a few weeks before the end of the season. Kuusela also works as an expert commentator for Yle.

He was inducted into the Finnish Football Hall of Fame in 2016.

== Managerial honours ==
Budapest Honvéd

- Nemzeti Bajnokság I: 1992–93

Individual

- Football Association of Finland: Captain's Ball 2020
