= 2000 Finnish Cup =

2000 Suomen Cup
Tournament details
- Country: Finland

The 2000 Finnish Cup (Finnish: Suomen Cup) was the 46th season of the main annual association football cup competition in Finland. It was organised as a single-elimination knock–out tournament and participation in the competition was voluntary. The final was held at the Finnair Stadium, Helsinki on 10 November 2000 with HJK defeating Kotkan TP by 1-0 before an attendance of 3,471 spectators.

== Early rounds ==
Not currently available.

== Round 7 ==
Tie no	Home team	Score	Away team	Information
1	AC Vantaa	5-1	KontU Helsinki	
2	Jokerit Helsinki	1-2	KTP Kotka	
3	FC Hämeenlinna	2-3	FC Lahti	
4	HJK Helsinki	3-0	United Tampere	

Tie no	Home team	Score	Away team	Information
5	Jaro Pietarsaari	1-0 (aet)	MyPa Anjalankoski	
6	RiPS Riihimäki	1-0	TPS Turku	
7	VJS Vantaa	0-4	VPS Vaasa	
8	Haka Valkeakoski	1-2 (aet)	Inter Turku	

== Quarter-finals ==
Tie no	Home team	Score	Away team	Information
1	FC Lahti	3-0	AC Vantaa	
2	KTP Kotka	5-0	RiPS Riihimäki	

Tie no	Home team	Score	Away team	Information
3	HJK Helsinki	4-0	Jaro Pietarsaari	
4	VPS Vaasa	1-3	Inter Turku	

== Semi-finals ==
Tie no	Home team	Score	Away team	Information
1	KTP Kotka	3-0	FC Lahti	

Tie no	Home team	Score	Away team	Information
2	HJK Helsinki	2-1	Inter Turku	

== Final ==
Tie no	Team 1	Score	Team 2	Information
1	HJK Helsinki	1-0	KTP Kotka	Att. 3,471
