= Eläintarha Stadium =

Multi-purpose stadium in Helsinki, Finland

- Eltsu
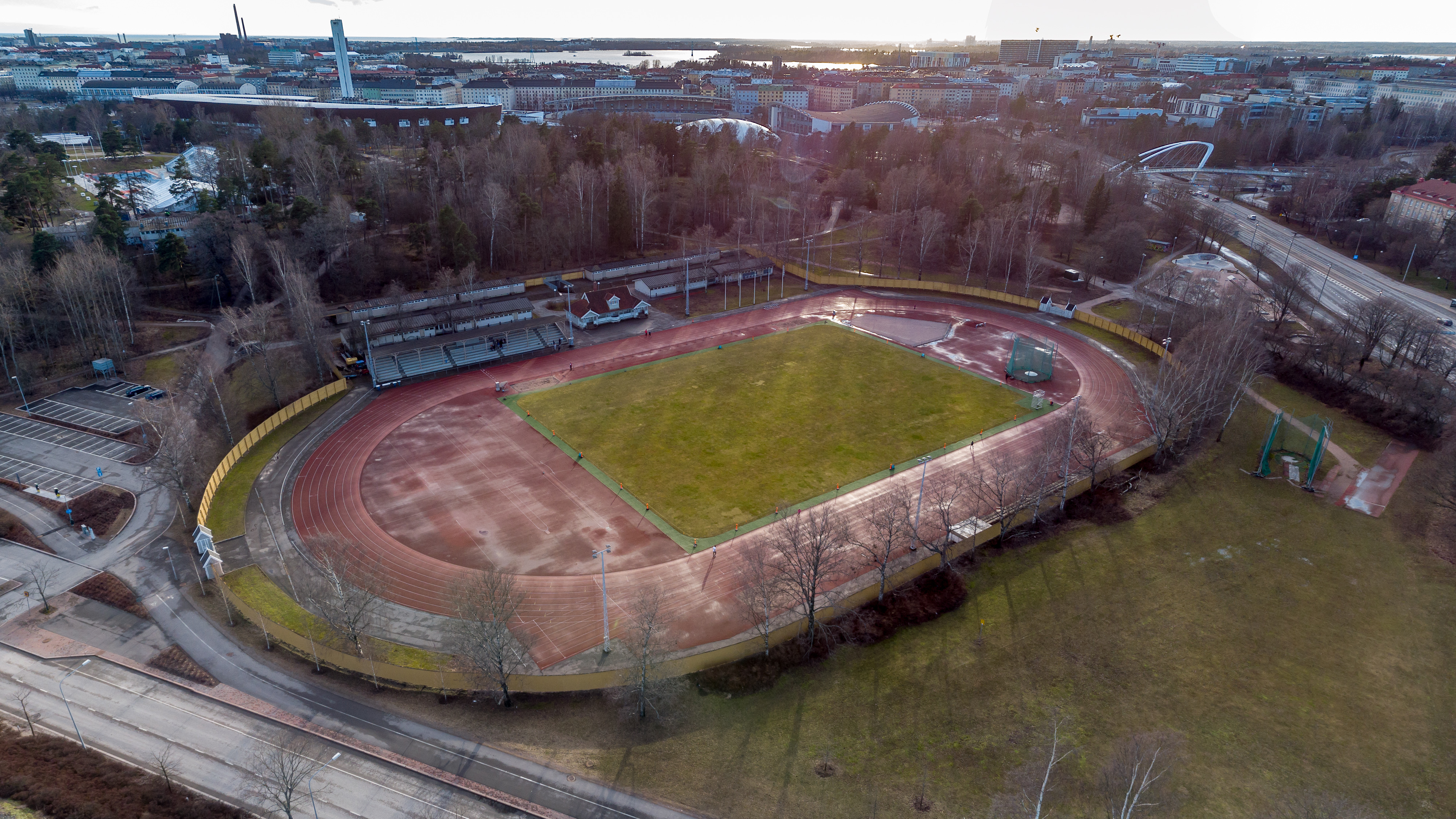
- Interactive map of Eläintarha Stadium
- Location: Helsinki, Finland
- Coordinates: 60°11′28″N 24°55′51″E
- Owner: City of Helsinki

Construction
- Built: 1903–1910
- Opened: 1910

Eläintarha Stadium (Finnish: Eläintarhan kenttä, Swedish: Djurgårdens sportplan) is a multi-purpose stadium at the Eläintarha park in Helsinki, Finland. It was opened in 1910 as the first stadium in Helsinki. Today it is mostly used by track and field athletes.

== History ==
Eläintarha Stadium served as the main sports venue of Helsinki until 1938, as the Olympic Stadium was completed. In 1911 Eläintarha hosted the first international of the Finland national football team and in 1925 the first annual Finland-Sweden Athletics International. It was fully renovated in 2005 and 2012 as the stadium was used as a warm-up area for the Athletics World and European Championships.

== World Records ==
The following World Records were set at the Eläintarha Stadium. On 19 June 1924 Paavo Nurmi first broke the 1,500 meters world record and 45 minutes later he set a new record in the 5,000 meter run.

1,500 meters

- 3:52.6 – (Finland) Paavo Nurmi, 19 June 1924

5 000 meters

- 14:28.2 – (Finland) Paavo Nurmi, 19 June 1924
- 14:17.0 – (Finland) Lauri Lehtinen, 19 June 1932

10 000 meters

- 30:35.4 – (Finland) Ville Ritola, 25 May 1924

110 metres hurdles

- 14.4 – (Finland) Bengt Sjöstedt, 5 September 1931

Javelin throw

- 76.10 – (Finland) Matti Järvinen, 15 June 1933

Decathlon

- 7,485.61 – (Estonia) Aleksander Klumberg, 22 September 1922
- 7,995.19 – (Finland) Paavo Yrjölä, 17 July 1927
