= Concession stand =

Place to buy snack or food

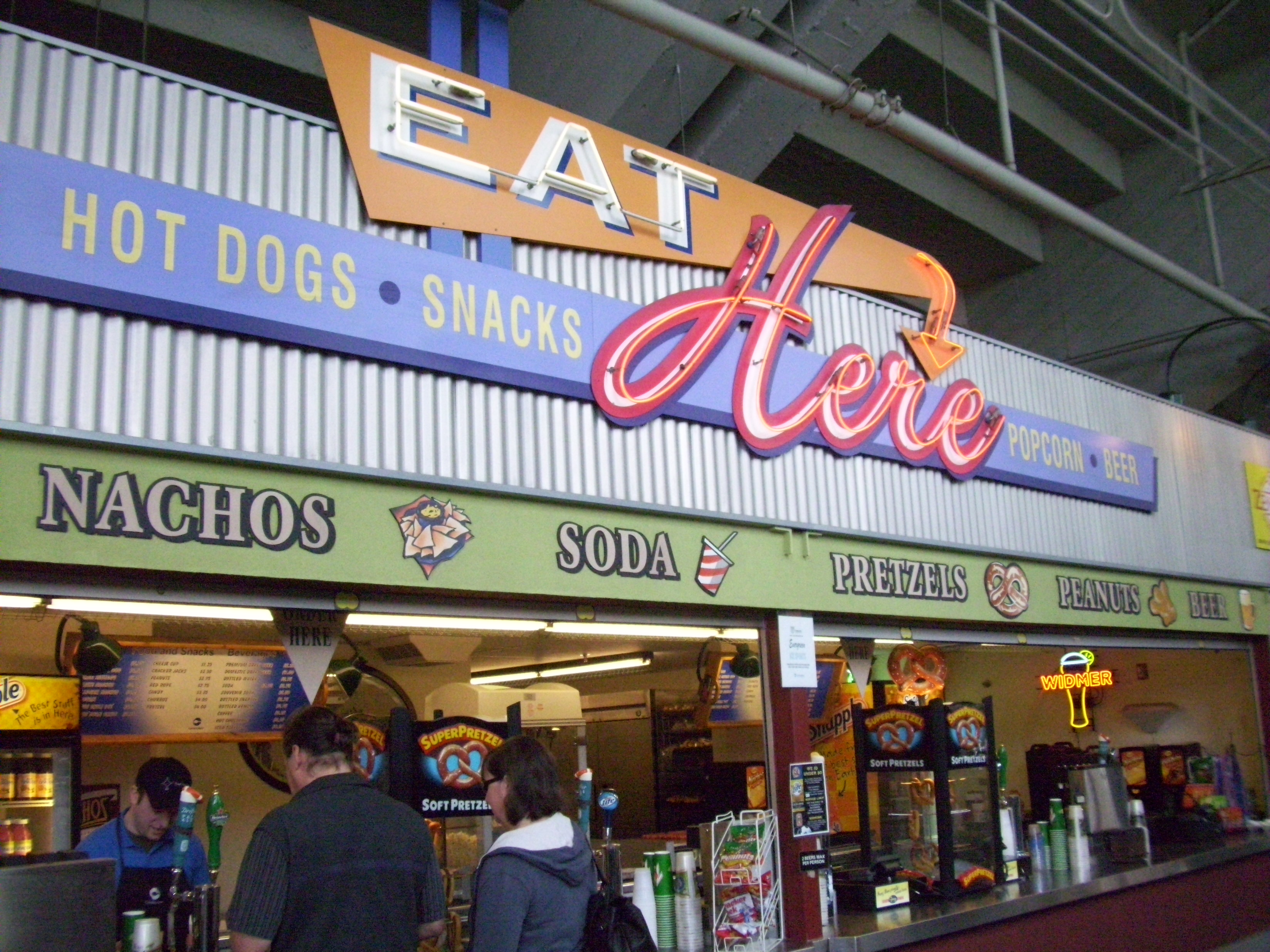
A concession stand at Providence Park in Portland, Oregon. Concession stands are a main fixture at sporting venues.

A concession stand, or refreshment stand (American English, Canadian English), snack kiosk or snack bar (British English, Irish English) is a place where patrons can purchase snacks or food at a cinema, amusement park, zoo, aquarium, circus, fair, stadium, beach, swimming pool, concert, sporting event, or other entertainment venue. Some events or venues contract the right to sell food to third parties. Those contracts are often referred to as a concession, hence the name for a stand where food is sold. Usually prices for goods at concession stands are greater than elsewhere for the convenience of being close to an attraction and thus often contribute significant revenue to the venue operator (especially in the case of movie theaters). Additionally, outside food and drink is often prohibited to incentivise spending at the concession stands.

== History ==
Concession stands were not originally operated by the movie theaters, and food was often sold by people attending the film or by vendors outside of the theater.

Movie theaters were at first hostile to food being brought into their facilities, but during the Great Depression, theaters added concession stands as a way to increase revenue in the economically stagnant times. Entrepreneur Jacob Beresin of Philadelphia is credited with pioneering the modern concession stand in U.S. movie theaters through his early 20th-century innovations and founding of Berlo Vending Company. By the 1930s, concession stands were a main fixture in many theaters. During World War II, candy was scarce at concession stands because of the sugar rationing going on at the time, and popcorn became more popular than before.

In the late 1940s, and early 1950s, as movie ticket sales were down, sales of food at concession stands increased. In the United States, concession owners are represented by the National Association of Concessionaires and the National Independent Concessionaires Association.

== Gallery ==
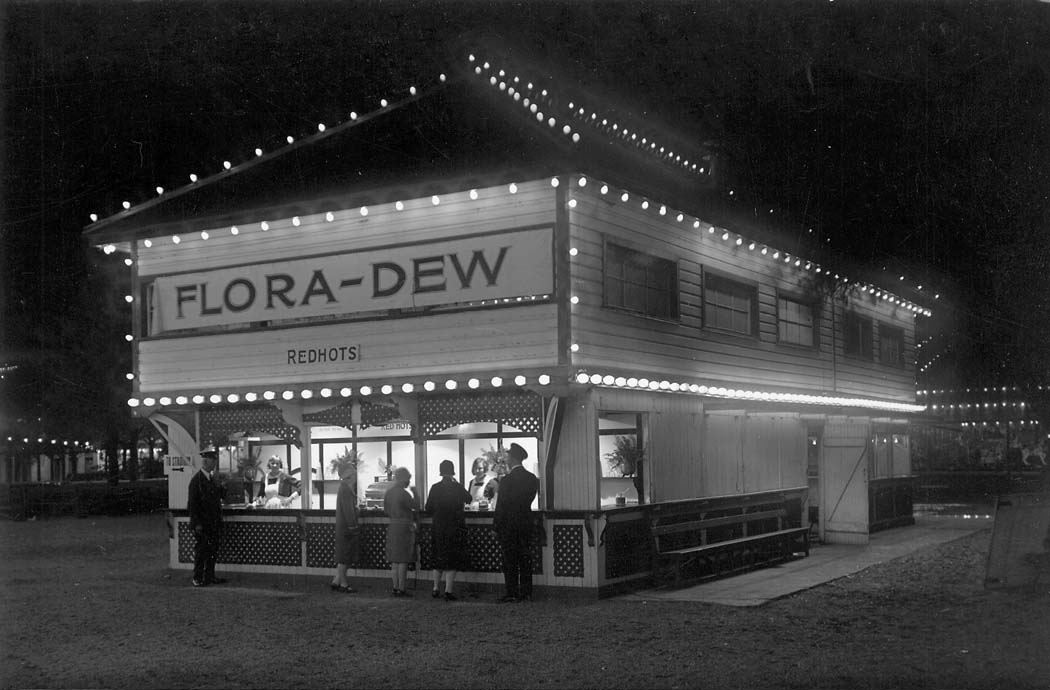
A concession stand by the name of "Flora-Dew" at Hanlan's Point in Toronto, Ontario. The image was taken in 1928 and depicts a typical stand from that time period.

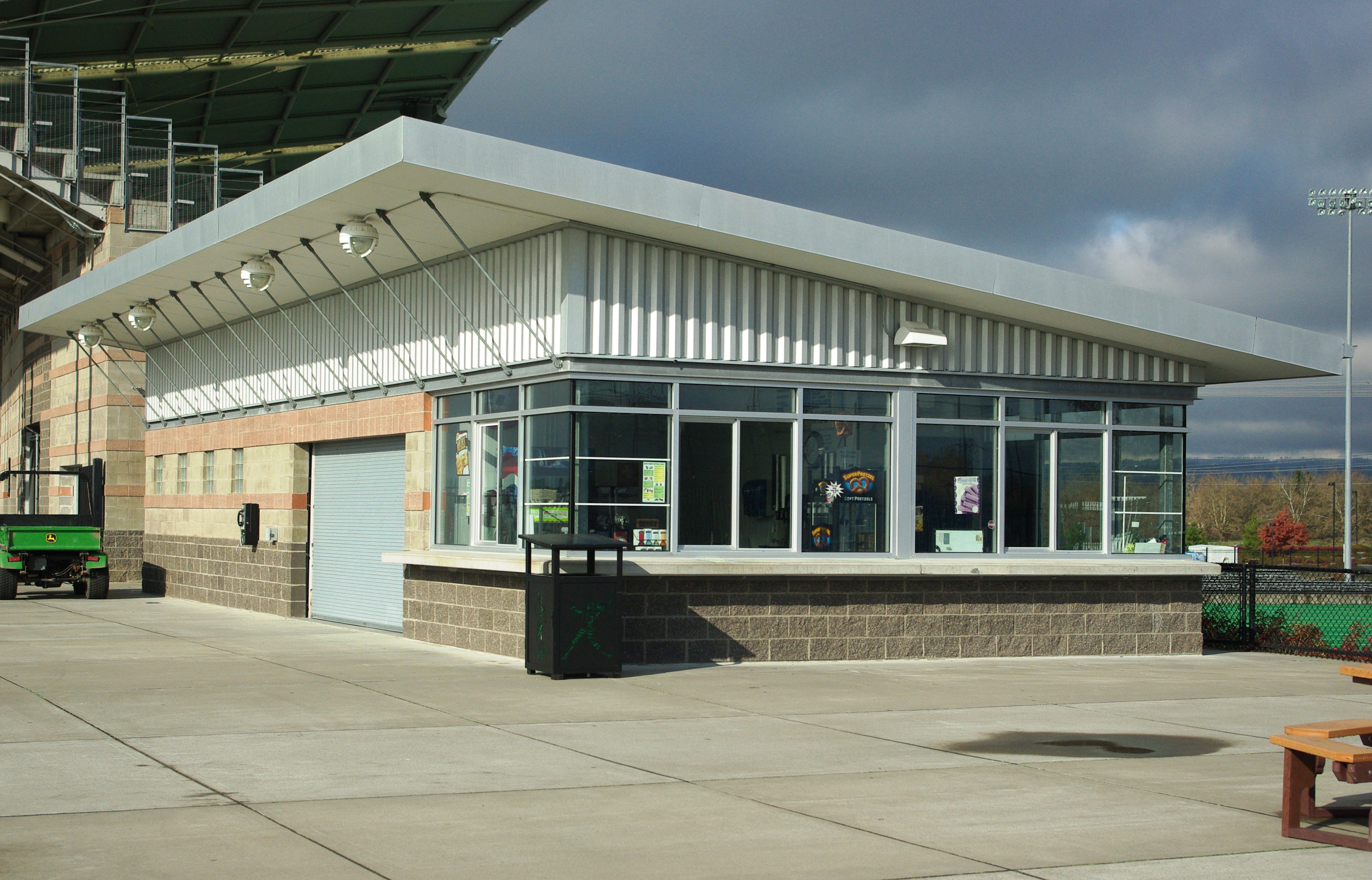
The concession stand at Hillsboro Stadium, in Hillsboro, Oregon, is an outdoor stand at a football field.

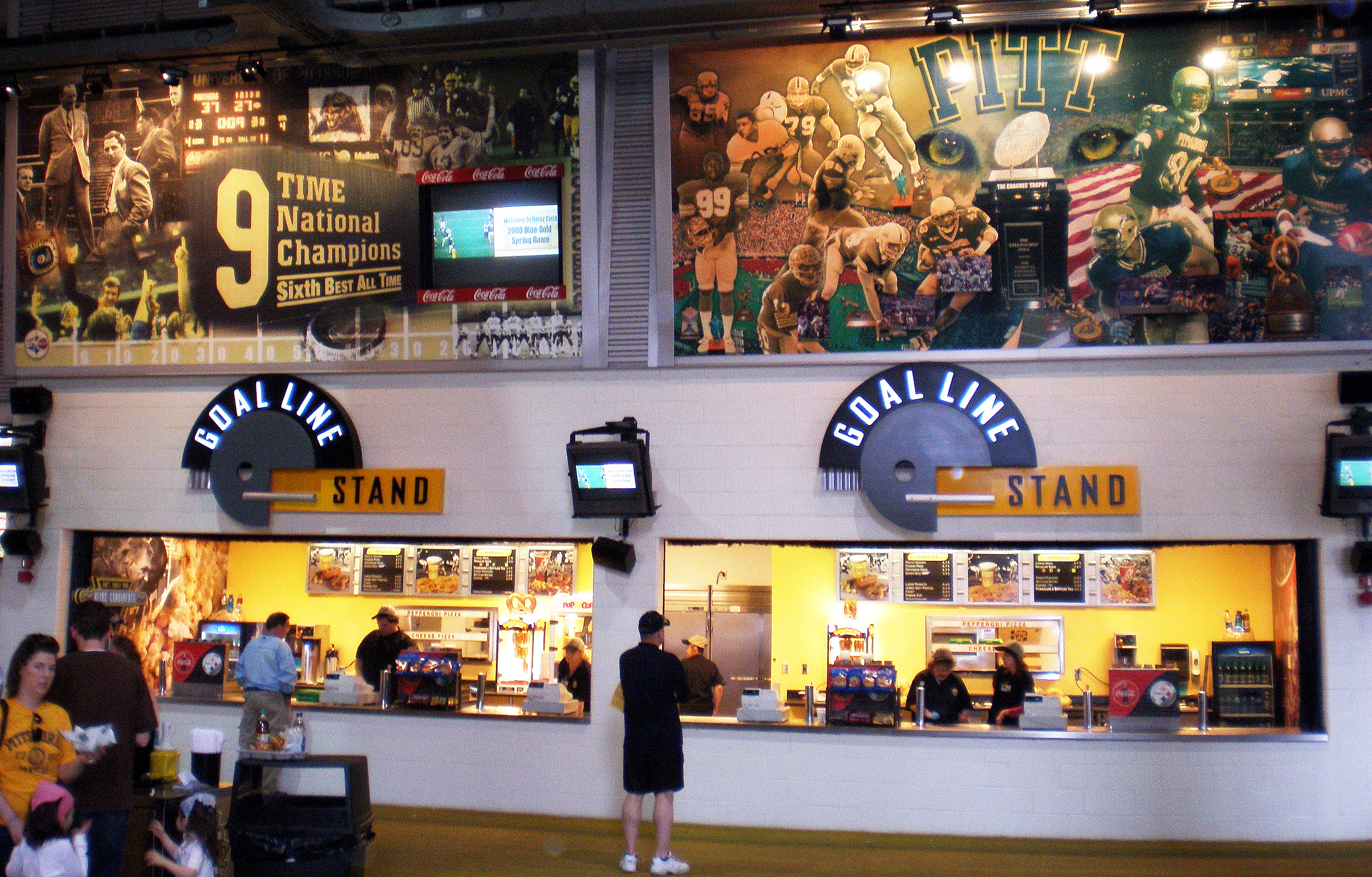
At Heinz Field, in Pittsburgh, Pennsylvania, the "Goal Line Stand" incorporates sports and food into their concession stand.

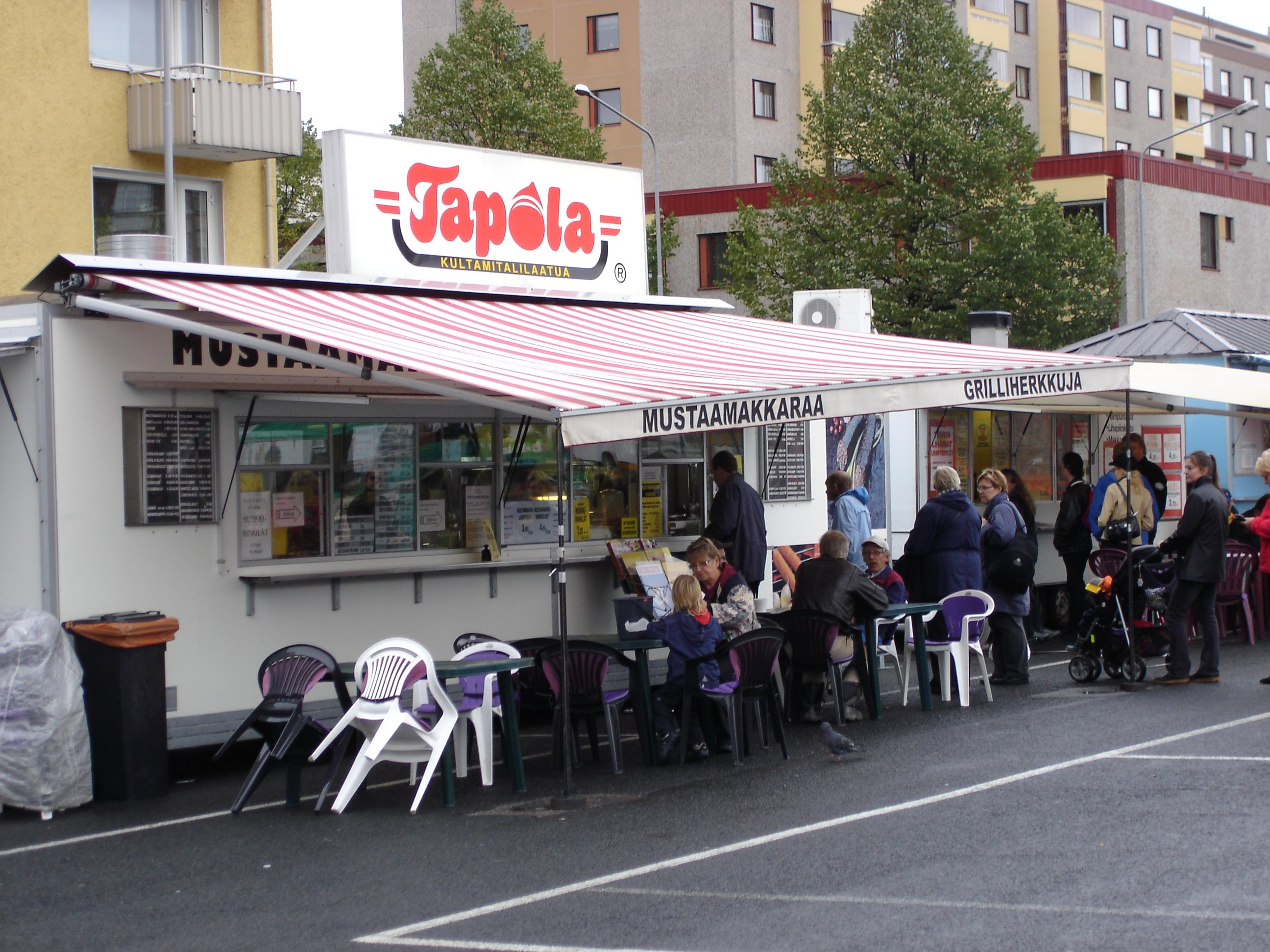
Tapola, famous purveyors of mustamakkara, at the Tammelantori square in Tampere, Finland

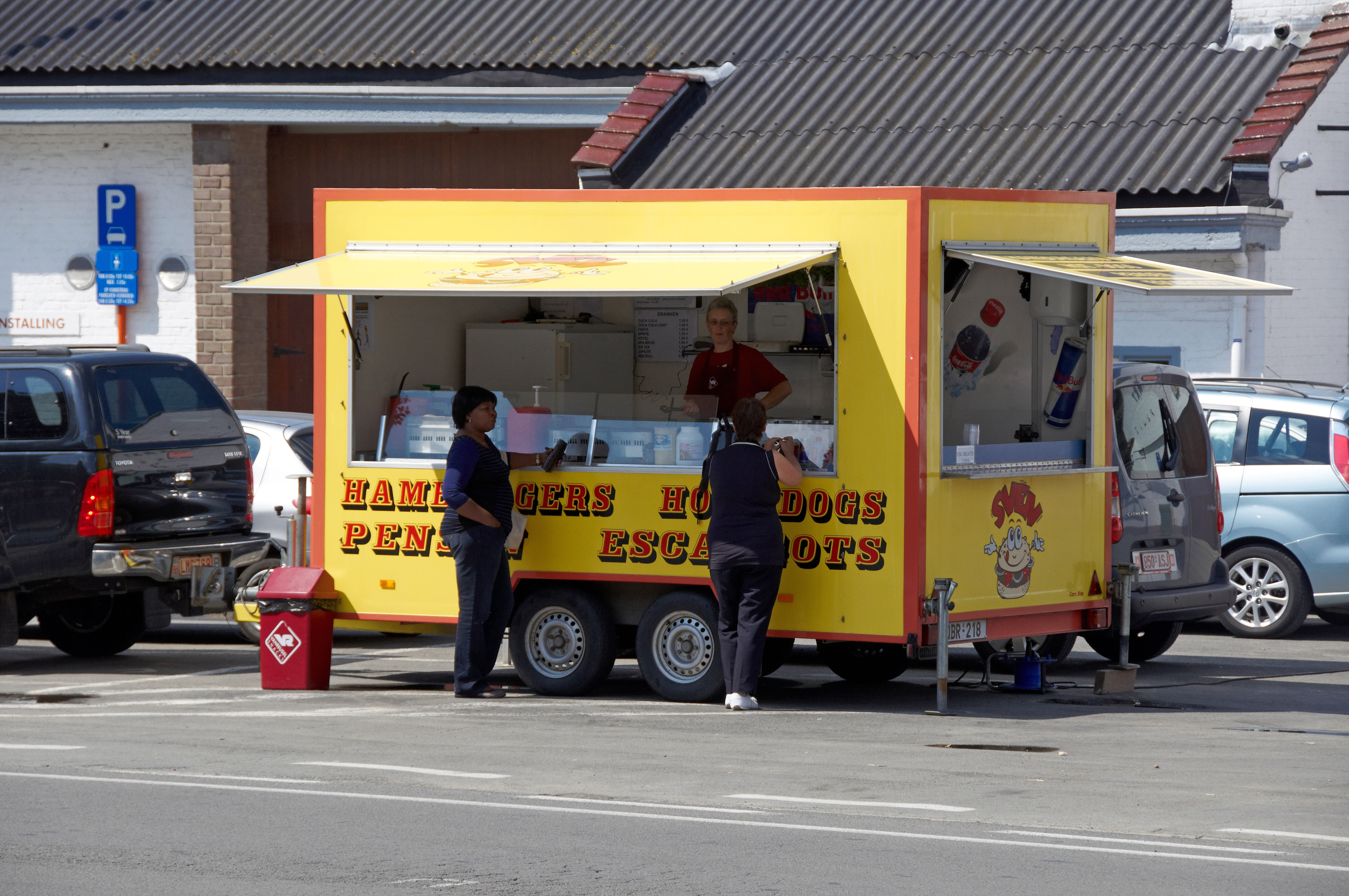
A mobile snack bar in Overijse, Belgium.

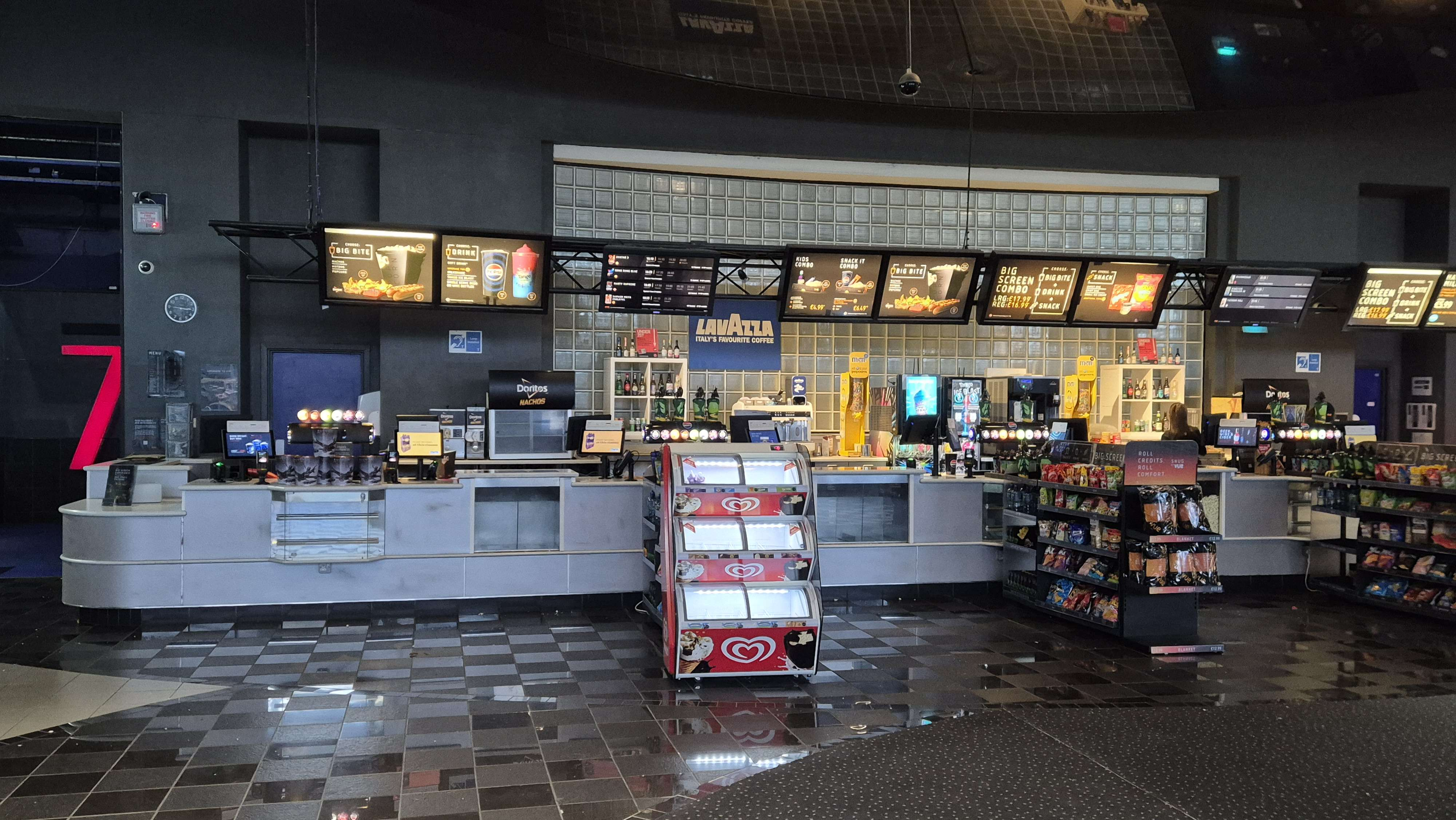
A snack kiosk at a cinema in Longwell Green, England.
