= Ilves (football) =

Finnish football club

- Full name: Tampereen Ilves
- Nickname: Ipa
- Founded: 1931; 95 years ago
- Ground: Tammela Stadion, Tampere
- Capacity: 8,000
- Chairman: Petri Ojala
- Manager: Camilo Speranza
- League: Veikkausliiga
- 2026: Veikkausliiga, 8th of 12
- Website: ilvesfootball.com
Home colours	Away colours	Third colours

Tampereen Ilves (pronounced [ˈilʋes]; Finnish for "Lynx"; Swedish: Ilves Tammerfors), commonly known as Ilves, is a Finnish professional football club based in Tampere. They currently play in the Veikkausliiga, the highest level of professional football in Finland.

== History ==
The club was founded in 1931 and played its first official football matches in the following year, playing in the local city and district leagues.

The young club found it difficult to recruit experienced players, however, and schoolboys who at the time made up the bulk of the membership often spent their summers in the country and were thus unavailable for matches. Thus the Ilves football team was disbanded in 1938 and the club concentrated on its other main sport, ice hockey.

Another brief stint of football activity begun during World War II, and in 1947, Ilves was for the first time close to being promoted to nationwide leagues. However, they lost the decisive match—their only loss that year—and after this disappointment, football was again removed from the club repertoire.

The third coming proved to be more long-lasting and successful, as Ilves merged with erstwhile rivals Tampellan Palloilijat and Ilves-Kissat (an unrelated club despite the similar name) in 1974. Ilves assumed the considerable debts of Ilves-Kissat and in return inherited their league berth in the I-Divisioona (first division). They spent four years there before gaining promotion to the Mestaruussarja for the first time in 1978.

Ilves' first year in the top flight was a mediocre one but they managed to avoid relegation and, more importantly, won their first major trophy as they beat TPS in the Finnish Cup final.

The cup win brought along Ilves' first European matches next year as they were drawn against Feyenoord in the 1980–81 Cup Winners' Cup. The Dutch giants proved too tough for the Finnish amateurs who won both legs.

The years 1983 to 1985 were Ilves' most successful to date. The club won their first league championship in 1983, finished 3rd the following year and 2nd in 1985. In the 1984–85 European Cup they met Juventus who easily swept Ilves away on their way to win the whole competition. The home leg at Tampere Stadium was witnessed by Ilves' all-time largest crowd of 24,073 spectators.

In the 1986–87 UEFA Cup Ilves played against Glasgow Rangers. Ilves scored their first European win on their home turf but the Glaswegians advanced to the second round with aggregate goals 2–4.

In 1990, Ilves scored their last trophy for a long while when they won the Finnish Cup. In the 1991–92 Cup Winners' Cup Ilves advanced for the first time to the second round in European competitions as they beat the Northern Irish club Glenavon F.C. They held AS Roma to a draw at home in the second round, but in the end Roma won the second leg 5–2.

In the early 1990s, Ilves struggled on and off the pitch. The Finnish economy entered a deep recession. Ilves found it difficult to acquire sponsorships, and high unemployment and lack of disposable income resulted in low attendance figures. At the end of the 1996 season they were relegated to the Ykkönen.

After two seasons on the second tier, Ilves was close to bankruptcy. Another merger was attempted, this time with TPV, but they withdrew from the talks after a close membership vote. Despite this, the Ilves' men's football team was reformed as Tampere United, and Ilves focused on its junior teams.

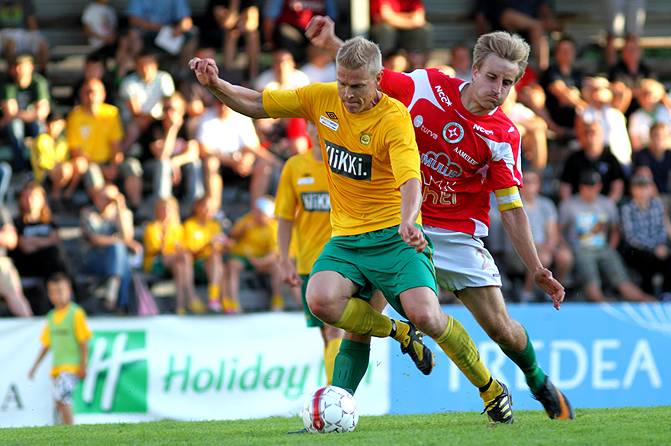
Jari Niemi of Ilves in a local derby against TPV in 2011

In the early 2010s, Tampere United was embroiled in a match-fixing and money laundering scandal. They were disqualified from the league and consequently went bankrupt. This left Tampere without a top-level football team, as TPV was also mired in the lower leagues.

Ilves had restarted its men's team in 2008 in the Kakkonen and begun a slow climb back to the top. After the demise of United, this was accelerated, and Ilves reached the Ykkönen in 2013 and returned to the Veikkausliiga for the 2015 season.

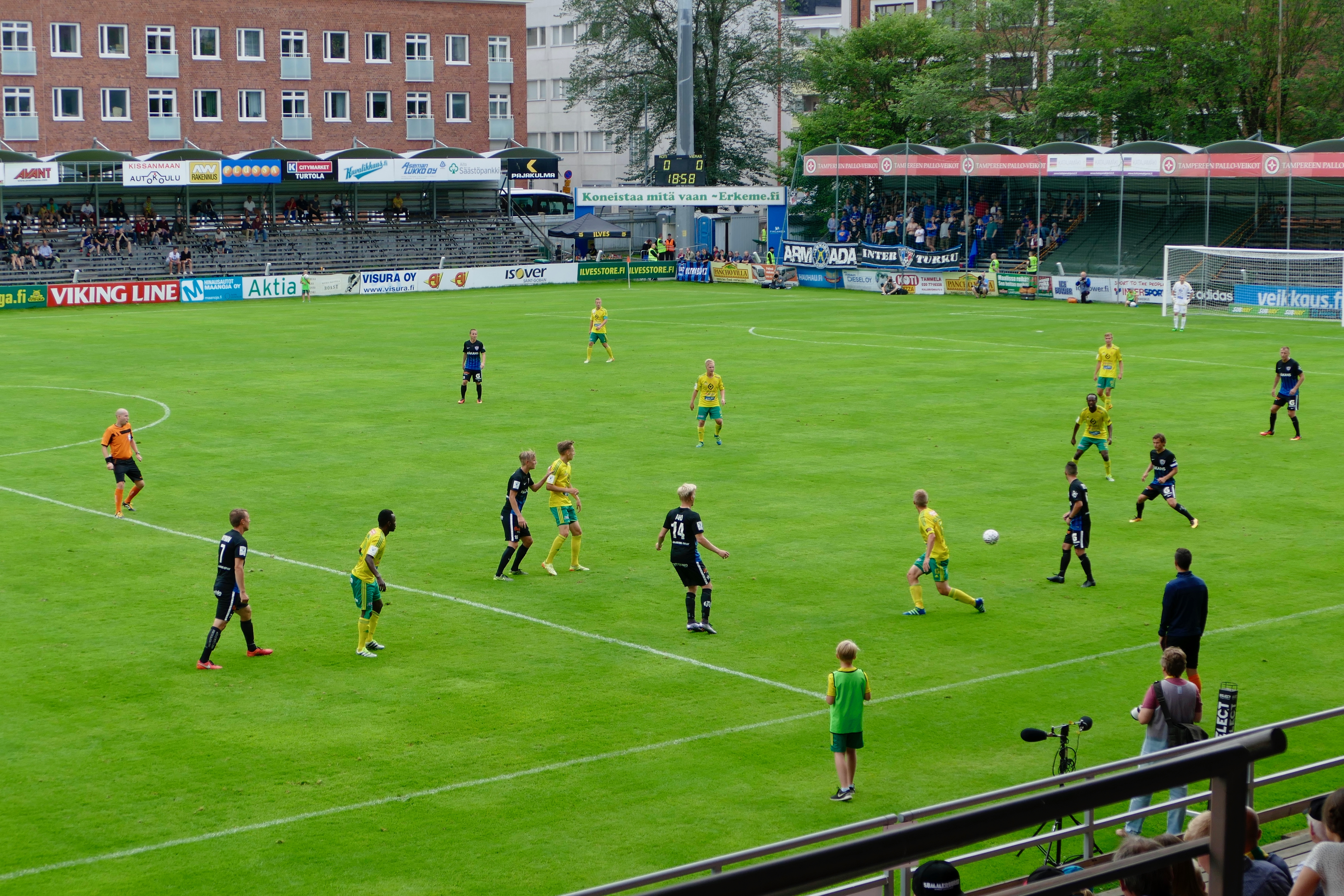
Against Inter Turku at the old Tammela Stadium in 2016

The club managed solidify its place in the Veikkausliiga, finishing in the middle of the table in their first two seasons and reaching 3rd place in 2017. This achievement brought them back into the Europa League, but the Bulgarian side Slavia Sofia proved too tough in the first qualifying round.

Ilves claimed their third Finnish Cup title in 2019 and returned to Europe in the following year, playing against Shamrock Rovers of Dublin in the 1st qualifying round of the Europa League. The match—played as a single leg due to the COVID-19 pandemic—ended 2–2, but after a lengthy penalty shootout which featured 13 attempts from both sides, the Rovers were victorious 12 to 11.

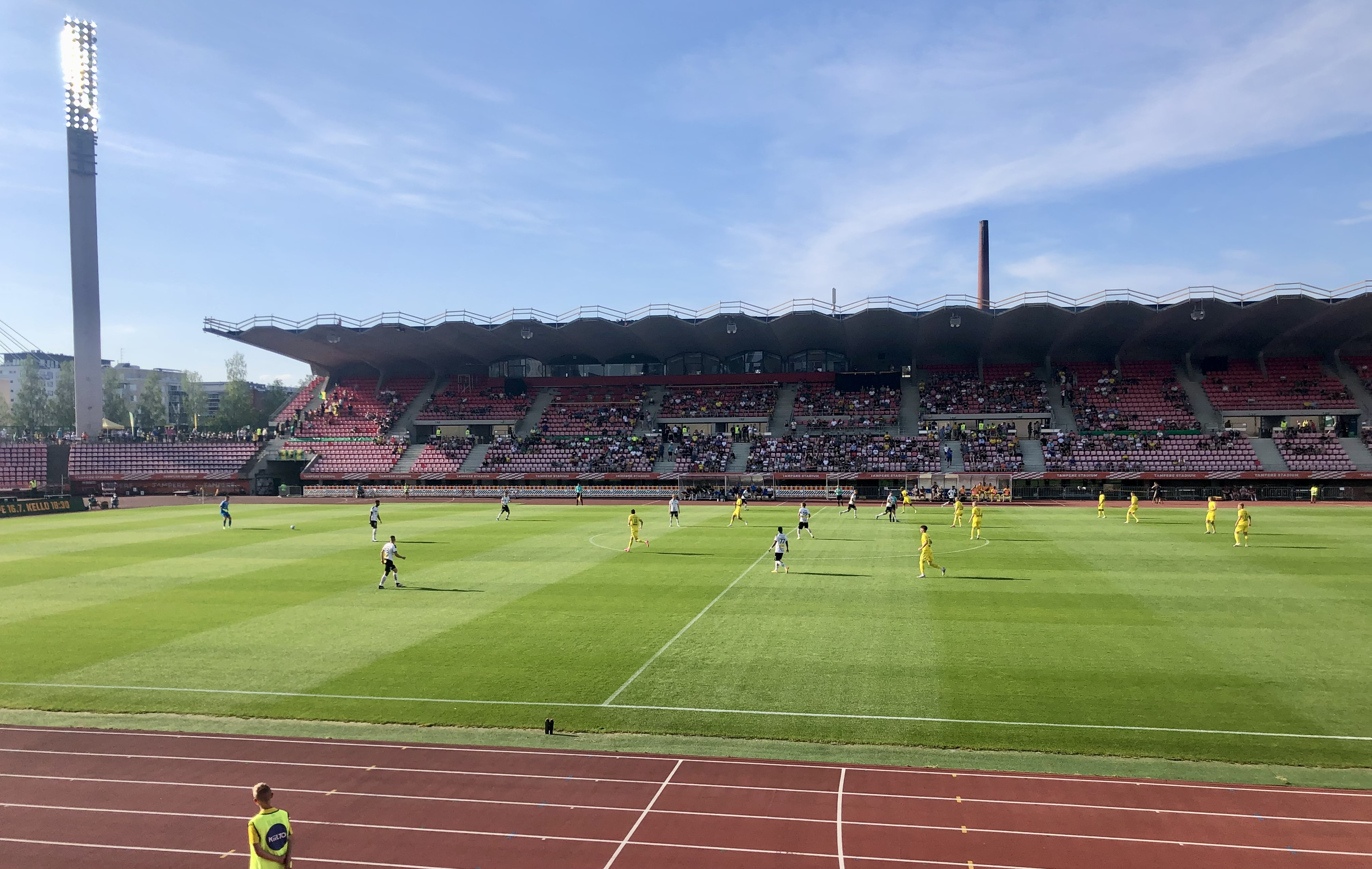
Against Haka at Tampere Stadium in 2021

Coming to the late 2010s, the atmospheric but aging Tammela stadium was no longer fit for professional football. The city decided to tear it down and build a completely new stadium in its place. This forced Ilves to relocate to the Tampere Stadium starting from the 2020 season. With a capacity of over 16,000, the Tampere Stadium was too large for the crowds Ilves was drawing at the time, and the running track between the pitch and the stands further contributed to a poor atmosphere in the games. This, combined with the effects of the pandemic and disappointing performance on the pitch, resulted in poor attendance and financial trouble.

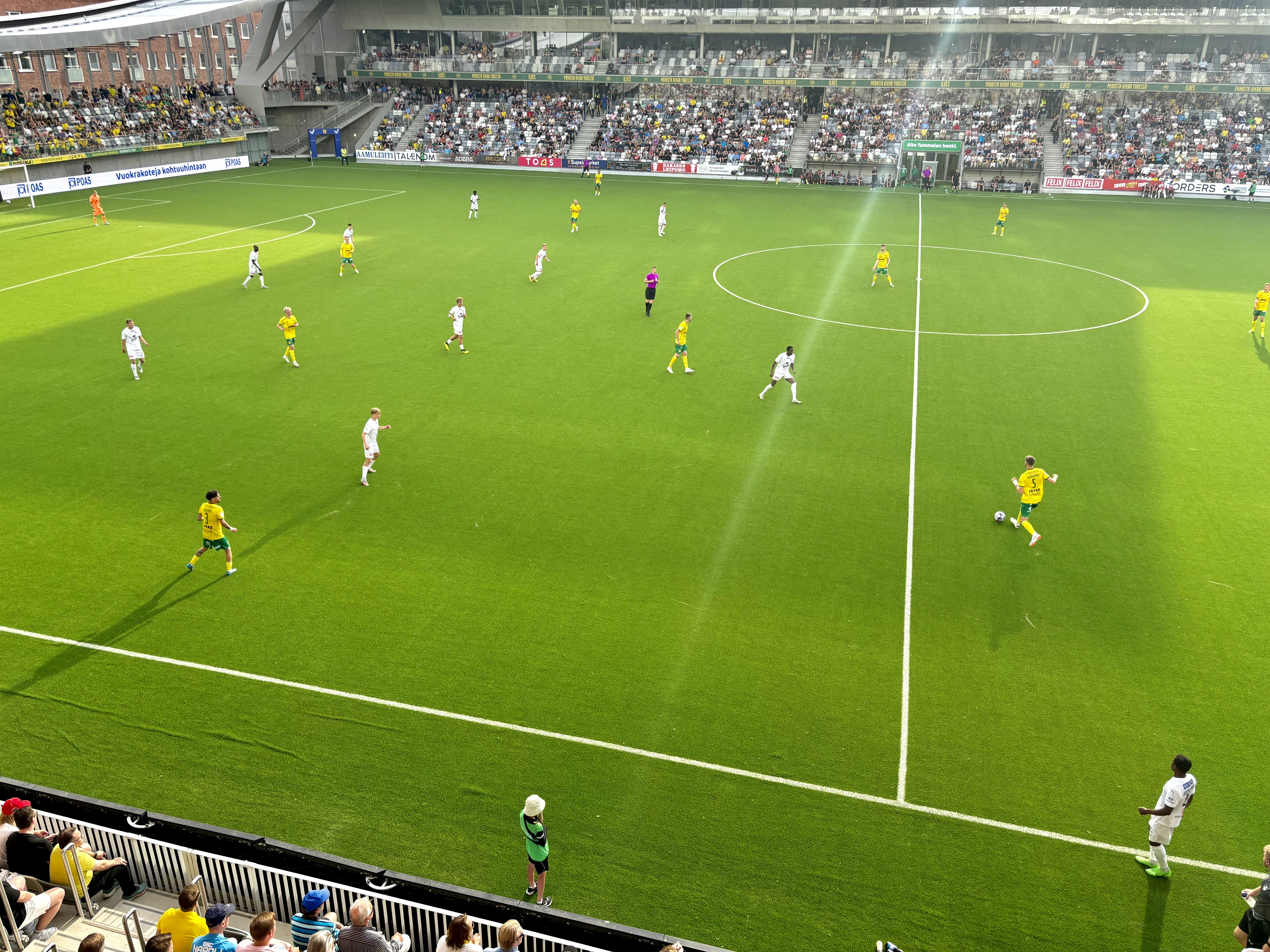
Against KuPS at the new Tammelan Stadion 2024

However, with a surprise Cup victory in 2023, together with the completion of the new stadium and the ice hockey division of Ilves stepping in to provide financial backing, Ilves was soon back among the top teams of the Veikkausliiga, having acquired sporting director Miika Takkula and head coach Joonas Rantanen. The first season in their rebuilt home resulted in a 2nd-place finish in the league and a strong run in Europe, during which Ilves eliminated Austria Wien in the 2nd qualification round of the 2024–25 UEFA Conference League before falling to Djurgården in the 3rd, with the aggregate score of 2–4.

== Colours and Badge ==
Ilves' traditional colours are green and yellow, with the home kit usually consisting of a yellow shirt and green shorts and the away kit being all green. Their first shirt had green and black vertical stripes; this has occasionally been repeated as a special kit, for example for the club's 90th anniversary match in 2021.

In 1992 and 1993 Ilves played in red, in accordance with the wishes of their main sponsor at the time; the away kit was white. The choice proved highly unpopular among supporters.

Ilves' first badge depicted a lynx passant. The current logo was designed by Rauno Broms in 1962 and has been used ever since.

=== Kit Suppliers ===
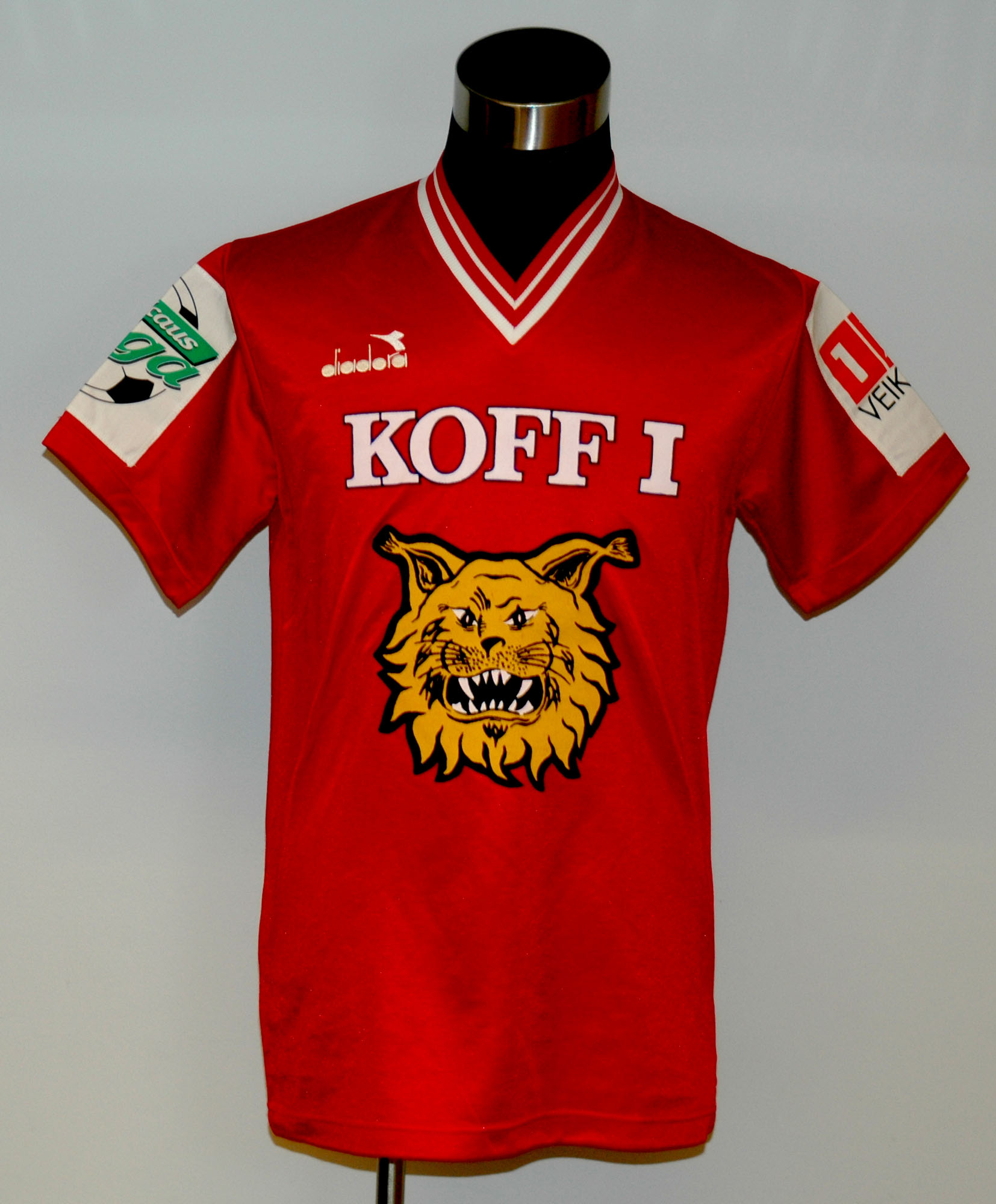
The infamous red shirt of the 1990s

Supplier	Period
Adidas	1975–1983
Umbro	1984–1986
Hummel	1987–1989
NR	1990
Hummel	1991–1992
Diadora	1993–1996
Mitre	1997–1998
Umbro	1999–2014
Adidas	2015–

== Grounds ==
The club's home ground is the Tammelan Stadion. Between 2020 and 2023, they played at Tampere Stadium while waiting for the Tammela stadium to be rebuilt.

== Honours ==
- Mestaruussarja/Veikkausliiga
  - Champions: 1983
  - Runners-up: 1985, 2024
- Finnish Cup
  - Winners: 1979, 1990, 2019, 2023

== Season to season ==
Season to Season

Season	Level	Division	Section	Administration	Position	Movements
1932-38 Tampere District Leagues
1939-42 No men's team.
1945-46	Tier 3	SPL Maakuntasarja (Third Division)	Group Häme	Finnish FA (Suomen Palloliitto)	2nd	
1946-47	Tier 3	SPL Maakuntasarja (Third Division)	Group Tampere	Finnish FA (Suomen Palloliitto)	3rd	
1948-74 Tampere District Leagues
1975	Tier 2	I Divisioona (First Division)		Finnish FA (Suomen Palloliitto)	3rd	Received league position from Ilves-Kissat
1976	Tier 2	I Divisioona (First Division)		Finnish FA (Suomen Palloliitto)	4th	
1977	Tier 2	I Divisioona (First Division)		Finnish FA (Suomen Palloliitto)	5th	
1978	Tier 2	I Divisioona (First Division)		Finnish FA (Suomen Palloliitto)	1st	Promoted
1979	Tier 1	Mestaruussarja (Premier League)		Finnish FA (Suomen Palloliitto)	10th	Relegation Group 1st
1980	Tier 1	SM-Sarja (Premier League)		Finnish FA (Suomen Palloliitto)	6th	Championship Group 6th
1981	Tier 1	SM-Sarja (Premier League)		Finnish FA (Suomen Palloliitto)	7th	Championship Group 5th
1982	Tier 1	SM-Sarja (Premier League)		Finnish FA (Suomen Palloliitto)	4th	Championship Group 7th
1983	Tier 1	SM-Sarja (Premier League)		Finnish FA (Suomen Palloliitto)	2nd	Championship Group 1st - Champions
1984	Tier 1	SM-Sarja (Premier League)		Finnish FA (Suomen Palloliitto)	4th	Championship Playoffs 3rd
1985	Tier 1	SM-Sarja (Premier League)		Finnish FA (Suomen Palloliitto)	4th	Championship Playoffs 2nd
1986	Tier 1	SM-Sarja (Premier League)		Finnish FA (Suomen Palloliitto)	6th	
1987	Tier 1	SM-Sarja (Premier League)		Finnish FA (Suomen Palloliitto)	4th	
1988	Tier 1	SM-Sarja (Premier League)		Finnish FA (Suomen Palloliitto)	8th	Relegation Group 3rd
1989	Tier 1	SM-Sarja (Premier League)		Finnish FA (Suomen Palloliitto)	6th	Championship Group 6th
1990	Tier 1	Futisliiga (Premier League)		Finnish FA (Suomen Palloliitto)	9th	
1991	Tier 1	Futisliiga (Premier League)		Finnish FA (Suomen Palloliitto)	6th	
1992	Tier 1	Veikkausliiga (Premier League)		Finnish FA (Suomen Palloliitto)	8th	
1993	Tier 1	Veikkausliiga (Premier League)		Finnish FA (Suomen Palloliitto)	12th	Relegation Group 6th
1994	Tier 1	Veikkausliiga (Premier League)		Finnish FA (Suomen Palloliitto)	12th	
1995	Tier 1	Veikkausliiga (Premier League)		Finnish FA (Suomen Palloliitto)	7th	
1996	Tier 1	Veikkausliiga (Premier League)		Finnish FA (Suomen Palloliitto)	10th	Relegation Group 4th - Relegated
1997	Tier 2	Ykkönen (First Division)	North Group	Finnish FA (Suomen Palloliitto)	8th	Relegation Group North 2nd
1998	Tier 2	Ykkönen (First Division)	North Group	Finnish FA (Suomen Palloliitto)	2nd	Relegation Group 5th, Promotion Playoff. First team continued as TamU
1999-2007 No men's team.
2008	Tier 3	Kakkonen (Second Division)	Group B	Finnish FA (Suomen Palloliitto)	5th	Received league spot from KooVee
2009	Tier 3	Kakkonen (Second Division)	Group B	Finnish FA (Suomen Palloliitto)	3rd	
2010	Tier 3	Kakkonen (Second Division)	Group B	Finnish FA (Suomen Palloliitto)	1st	Promotion Group 3rd
2011	Tier 3	Kakkonen (Second Division)	Group B	Finnish FA (Suomen Palloliitto)	2nd	Promotion Playoff
2012	Tier 3	Kakkonen (Second Division)	Group West	Finnish FA (Suomen Palloliitto)	1st	Promotion Playoff - Promoted
2013	Tier 2	Ykkönen (First Division)		Finnish FA (Suomen Palloliitto)	4th	
2014	Tier 2	Ykkönen (First Division)		Finnish FA (Suomen Palloliitto)	3rd	Promoted
2015	Tier 1	Veikkausliiga (Premier League)		Finnish FA (Suomen Palloliitto)	8th	
2016	Tier 1	Veikkausliiga (Premier League)		Finnish FA (Suomen Palloliitto)	5th	
2017	Tier 1	Veikkausliiga (Premier League)		Finnish FA (Suomen Palloliitto)	3rd	
2018	Tier 1	Veikkausliiga (Premier League)		Finnish FA (Suomen Palloliitto)	5th	
2019	Tier 1	Veikkausliiga (Premier League)		Finnish FA (Suomen Palloliitto)	4th	
2020	Tier 1	Veikkausliiga (Premier League)		Finnish FA (Suomen Palloliitto)	5th	
2021	Tier 1	Veikkausliiga (Premier League)		Finnish FA (Suomen Palloliitto)	5th	
2022	Tier 1	Veikkausliiga (Premier League)		Finnish FA (Suomen Palloliitto)	9th	
2023	Tier 1	Veikkausliiga (Premier League)		Finnish FA (Suomen Palloliitto)	8th	
2024	Tier 1	Veikkausliiga (Premier League)		Finnish FA (Suomen Palloliitto)	2nd	

- 28 seasons in the top flight (Mestaruussarja, SM-sarja, Futisliiga or Veikkausliiga)
- 13 seasons on tier 2 (then Ykkönen)
- 8 seasons on tier 3 (then Kakkonen)

== European record ==
Season	Competition	Round	Club	1st leg	2nd leg	Aggregate	Y/N
1980–81	UEFA Cup Winners' Cup	1R	(Netherlands) Feyenoord	1–3	2–4	3–7	
1984–85	European Cup	1R	(Italy) Juventus	0–4	1–2	1–6	
1986–87	UEFA Cup	1R	(Scotland) Rangers	0–4	2–0	2–4	
1991–92	UEFA Cup Winners' Cup	1R	(Northern Ireland) Glenavon	2–3	2–1	4–4 (a)	
1991–92	UEFA Cup Winners' Cup	2R	(Italy) Roma	1–1	2–5	3–6	
2018–19	UEFA Europa League	1QR	(Bulgaria) Slavia Sofia	0–1	1–2	1–3	
2020–21	UEFA Europa League	1QR	(Republic of Ireland) Shamrock Rovers			2–2 (11–12 p)	
2024–25	UEFA Conference League	2QR	Austria Wien	2–1	3–4 (a.e.t.)	5–5 (5–4 p)	
2024–25	UEFA Conference League	3QR	(Sweden) Djurgården	1–1	1–3	2–4	
2025–26	UEFA Europa League	1QR	(Ukraine) Shakhtar Donetsk	0–6	0–0	0–6	
2025–26	UEFA Conference League	2QR	(Netherlands) AZ	4–3	0–5	4–8	
2026–27	UEFA Conference League	1QR	(Luxembourg) Differdange 03	0–0	3–1	3–1	
2026–27	UEFA Conference League	2QR	(Iceland) Stjarnan	0–1	2–1 (a.e.t.)	2–2 (5–4 p)	
2026–27	UEFA Conference League	3QR	(Croatia) Rijeka	0–1	1–1	1–2	

== Current squad ==
As of 11 September 2026

Note: Flags indicate national team as defined under FIFA eligibility rules; some limited exceptions apply. Players may hold more than one non-FIFA nationality.

No.	Pos.	Nation	Player
3	DF	FIN	Matias Rale
4	DF	FIN	Oliver Pettersson
5	DF	FIN	Sauli Väisänen (captain)
6	MF	VEN	Yiandro Raap
8	MF	FIN	Maksim Stjopin
9	FW	FIN	Teemu Hytönen
11	FW	CIV	Hamidou Coulibaly
12	GK	BIH	Faris Krkalić
13	DF	FIN	Kalle Wallius
14	MF	FIN	Anton Popovitch
15	MF	FIN	Lauri Ala-Myllymäki

No.	Pos.	Nation	Player
16	DF	FIN	Tatu Miettunen
17	FW	FIN	Stanislav Baranov
19	DF	CIV	Goudouss Bamba
22	MF	FIN	Oskari Multala
24	DF	FIN	Ville Kumpu
25	DF	FIN	Sebastian Suvanne
27	DF	CIV	Franck Kouakou
28	MF	FIN	Jesse Kilo
31	GK	FIN	Rasmus Leislahti
33	MF	CIV	Yacouba Sacko

=== On loan ===
Note: Flags indicate national team as defined under FIFA eligibility rules; some limited exceptions apply. Players may hold more than one non-FIFA nationality.

No.	Pos.	Nation	Player
1	GK	FIN	Otso Virtanen (at Gnistan until 31 December 2026)
2	DF	FIN	Eetu Turkki (at TPS until 31 December 2026)
—	MF	FIN	Miko Koivuniemi (at MP until 31 December 2026)
20	MF	FIN	Otto Tiitinen (at Charlton Athletic until 30 June 2027)
10	FW	FIN	Roope Riski (at AC Oulu until 31 December 2026)
33	FW	FIN	Oskari Paavola (at Haka until 31 December 2026)
—	FW	LAT	Nils Veinbergs (at TPS until 31 December 2026)

== Management and boardroom ==
=== Management and staff ===
As of 8 July 2026.

Name	Role
(Uruguay) Camilo Speranza	Head coach
(Finland) Henri Jussila	Coach
(Finland) Jarkko Ojaniemi	Goalkeeping coach
(Finland) Ville Niemelä	Kit manager / Team manager
(Finland) Heli Rekimies	Fitness coach / Physiotherapist
(Finland) Jonne Väisänen	Doctor
(Finland) Jussi Saariaho	Physiotherapist
(Finland) Tiina Röning	Mental coach

=== Scouting ===
As of 28 August 2024

Name	Role
(Finland) Jyrki Ahola	Scout
(Finland) Henri Määttä	Scout
(France) Simon Garnier	Scout

=== Boardroom ===
As of 7 February 2026

Name	Role
(Finland) Petri Ojala	Chairman
(Finland) Risto Niklas-Salminen	Chief Executive Officer
(Finland) Iikka Miettinen	Sporting director
(Finland) Sanna Rinne	Chief Financial Officer

== Ilves/2 ==
Ilves/2 is the reserve team of Ilves. The team plays in Kakkonen in 2026 season. It is coached by Pasi Tuutti.

== Managers ==
- (Finland) Raimo Vasama (1975)
- (Finland) Martti Halme (1976–1977)
- (Finland) Pertti Mäkipää (1978–1981)
- (Finland) Jussi Ristimäki (1982–1984)
- (Finland) Turo Flink (1985–1986)
- (Finland) Harri Holli (1987–1989)
- (Finland) Jussi Ristimäki (1990)
- (Scotland) Ian Crawford (1991–1992)
- (Finland) Matti Paatelainen (1993)
- (Finland) Markku Wacklin (1993–1994)
- (Finland) Esa Kuusisto (1995–1996)
- (Finland) Arto Uimonen (1997)
- (Finland) Ari Hjelm (1997)
- (Finland) Kari Nikkilä (1998)
- (Finland) Janne Salovaara / Jarmo Virtanen (2001)
- (Finland) Veijo Visuri (2008–2009)
- (Russia) (Finland) Valeri Popovitch (2010–11)
- (Finland) Mika Malinen (2012–2014)
- (England) Keith Armstrong (2015)
- (Finland) Jarkko Wiss (2016–2021)
- (Finland) Toni Kallio (2021–2023)
- (Finland) Joonas Rantanen (2023–2025)
- (Finland) Joni Lehtonen (2023, 2026)
- (Uruguay) Camilo Speranza (2026–present)

== See also ==
- Ilves (ice hockey)
