= Tammelan Stadion (1931) =

Former football stadium in Tampere, Finland

Coordinates: 61.5003°N 23.7853°E

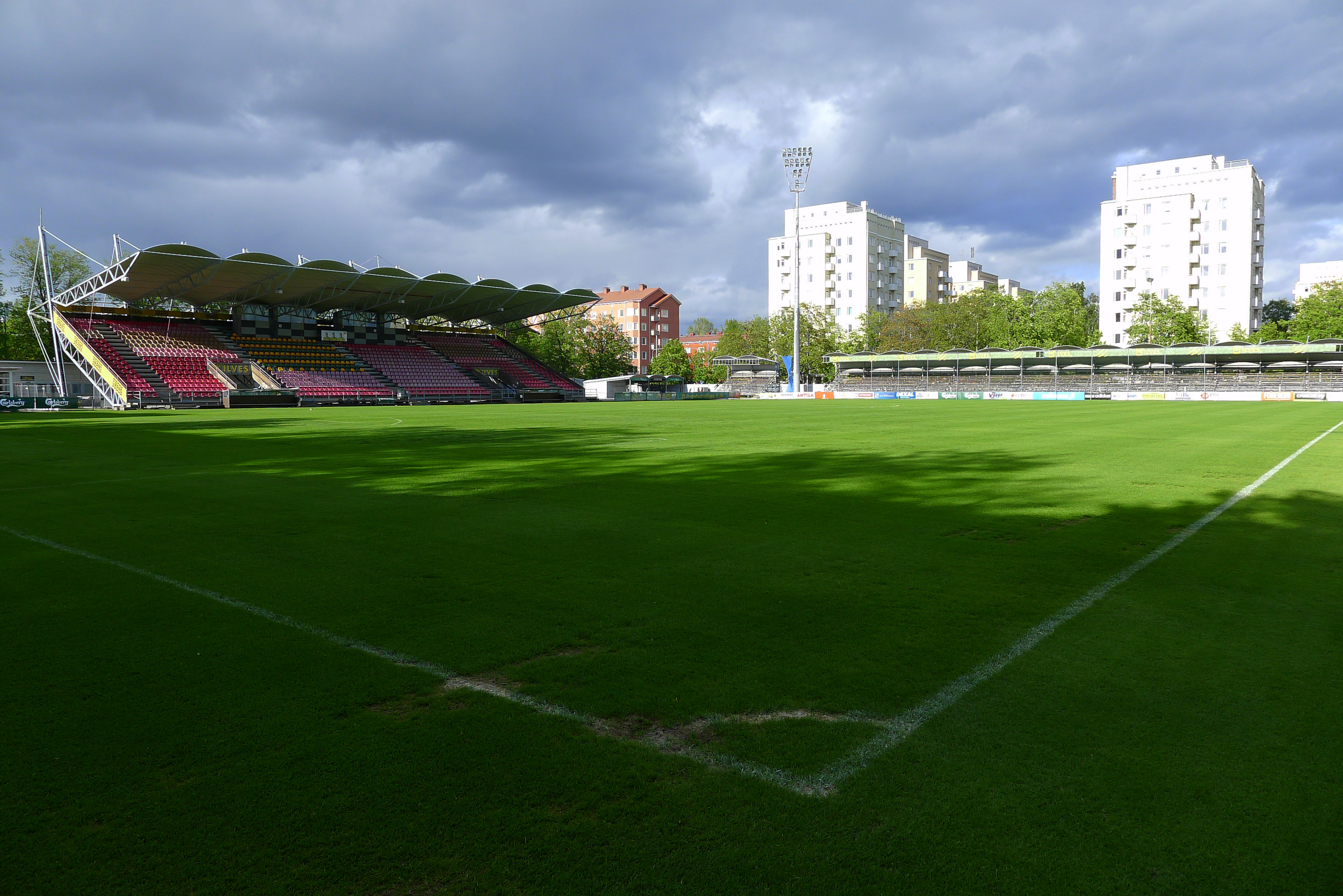
- Tammelan Stadion in 2015
- Interactive map of Tammelan Stadion
- Location: Tammela, Tampere
- Owner: City of Tampere
- Operator: Ilves
- Capacity: 5,050
- Surface: Grass

Construction
- Opened: 1931
- Renovated: 1994
- Closed: 2020

Tenants
- Ilves; TPV; Tampere United

The former Tammelan Stadion was a football stadium in Tampere, Finland. It was the home ground for football clubs Ilves and TPV and Tampere United. The old ground was in use between 1931 and 2020.

== Old stadium (1931-2020) ==
The history of the stadium dates back to 1926, when the city council of Tampere decided to build a football field in Tammela. Progress, however, was slow due to limited funds, and the situation worsened during the economic depression of the late 1920s and early 1930s. Despite these setbacks, the field officially opened in 1931, though it didn't resemble a stadium until 1937 when the first stand was constructed. In 1993, the stands were expanded to a nominal capacity of 5,050, with only the main stand offering 1,300 numbered seats. The stadium's attendance record was set on October 2, 1994, when 5,490 spectators attended a match between TPV and HJK.

As the stadium no longer met Veikkausliiga standards, plans for a replacement became necessary. In 2014, the city of Tampere held an architectural competition for a new stadium design. The winning proposal included not only a UEFA Category 4 stadium with artificial turf but also apartments, offices, and retail spaces. Construction was completed in January 2024.
