= Henri Määttä =

Finnish football scout, TV-director and former footballer, born 1987

Personal information
- Date of birth: 14 July 1987 (age 39)
- Place of birth: Vantaa, Finland
- Height: 1.79 m (5 ft 10 in)
- Position: Midfielder

Team information
- Current team: Ilves (scout)

Senior career*
Years	Team	Apps	(Gls)
- PK-35
2008–2010	HIFK		
- Futura

Managerial career
- 2013–2016: HIFK (sporting director)
- 2017–2019: KuPS (scout)
- 2020–2023: HJK (scout)
- 2023–: Ilves (scout)
- * Club domestic league appearances and goals

Henri Määttä (born 14 July 1987) is a Finnish football scout and a data-analyst, and a former footballer who played as a midfielder. He is currently working in a scouting team of Veikkausliiga club Ilves. Määttä is also a freelance TV-director, and has worked for Yle.

== Personal life ==
Määttä is married with Finnish sports reporter Inka Henelius since 2012. The wedding ceremony was held in the Porvoo Cathedral. Their first child, a boy, was born in October 2016. They currently reside in Porvoo.
