= Sebastian Suvanne =

Finnish footballer (born 2006)

Personal information
- Date of birth: 27 December 2006 (age 19)
- Place of birth: Helsinki, Finland
- Height: 1.79 m (5 ft 10 in)
- Position: Left back

Team information
- Current team: Ilves
- Number: 25

Youth career
- –2018: FC POHU
- 2018–2019: PiTa
- 2020–2021: HJK
- 2022: PPJ
- 2023: FC Honka

Senior career*
Years	Team	Apps	(Gls)
2023	Honka akatemia	1	(0)
2024–	Ilves II	31	(2)
2026–	Ilves	5	(0)

International career^{‡}
2023	Finland U17	1	(0)
2023–2024	Finland U18	3	(0)
- * Club domestic league appearances and goals as of 13 November 2026 ‡ National team caps and goals as of 18 July 2026

Sebastian Suvanne (born 27 December 2006) is a Finnish professional football player who plays as a left back for Veikkausliiga side Ilves.

== Club career ==
Born in Helsinki, Suvanne played for various youth setups including FC POHU, Pitäjänmäen Tarmo, HJK, and PPJ, before joining FC Honka in 2023. During his single season with Honka, he made his senior-level debut for the club's academy side in the third-tier Kakkonen, while also breaking into the first-team training squad.

In December 2023, Suvanne signed a two-year contract with a one-year extension option to join Ilves, initially assigned to their reserve squad, Ilves II. Despite suffering from early-season injuries during his 2024 campaign, he established himself as a versatile, pacey wingback upon his return to the pitch in late August. Following a string of positive developmental steps, Ilves formally exercised their contract option in November 2025, securing his position with the club through the 2026 season. Suvanne subsequently earned his competitive first-team breakthrough into the senior squad during the 2026 Veikkausliiga campaign.

== International career ==
Suvanne is a youth international for Finland, having represented his country at both the under-17 and under-18 levels, making his debut during the 2023 international cycle.
