= Tammelan Stadion =

Football stadium in Tampere, Finland

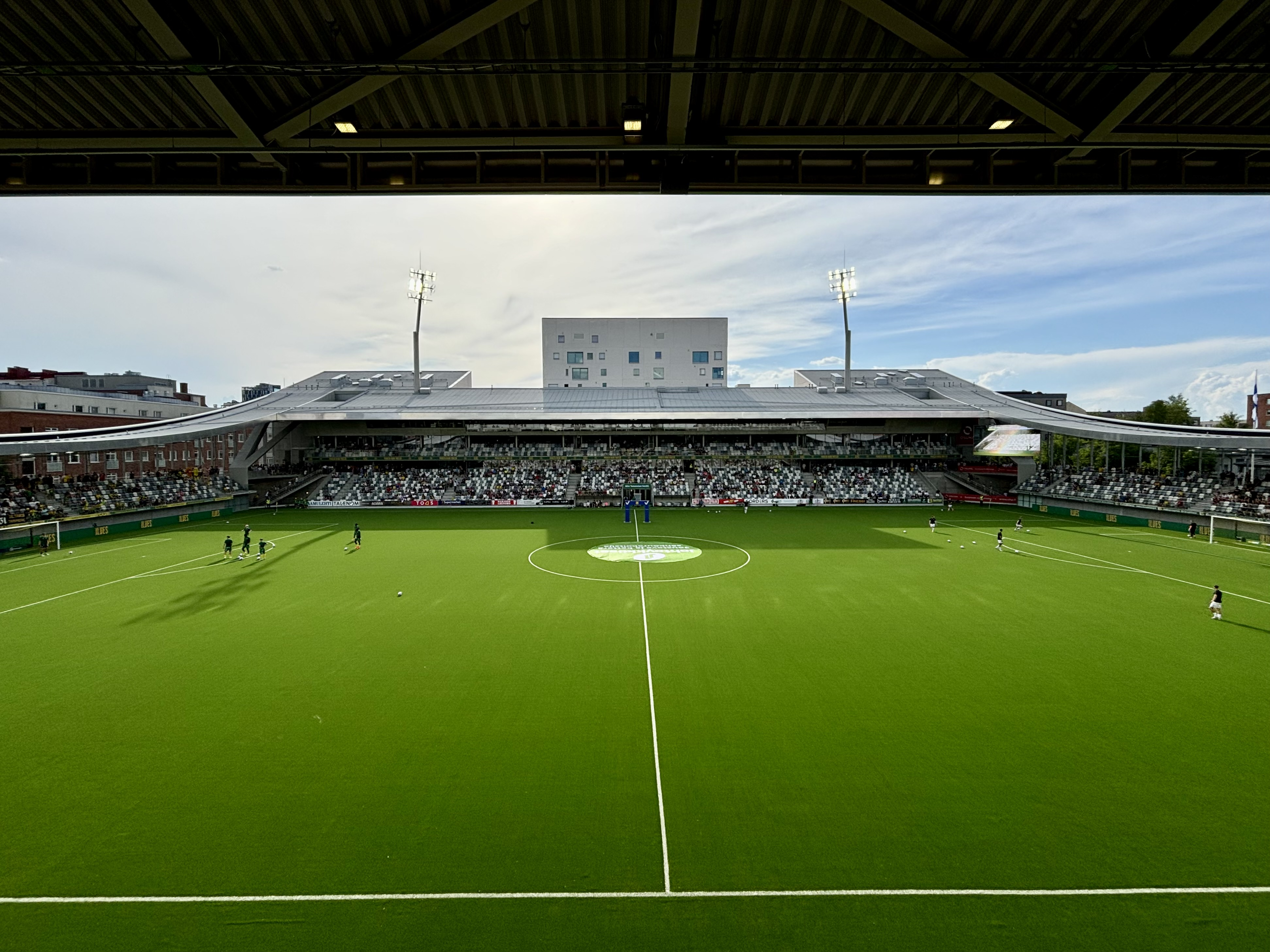
- UEFA
- Interactive map of Tammelan Stadion
- Location: Tammela, Tampere
- Coordinates: 61°30′1″N 23°47′7″E
- Owner: City of Tampere
- Operator: Ilves
- Capacity: 8,017
- Surface: Artificial Turf

Construction
- Groundbreaking: July 2021; 5 years ago
- Built: 2021-2023
- Opened: November 2023; 2 years ago
- Architect: JKMM Architects

Tenant
- Ilves

Tammelan Stadion is a football stadium in Tampere, Finland. It is the home ground for the Veikkausliiga club Ilves and the Ilves women's team, which competes in the Kansallinen Liiga. The stadium is a UEFA category 4 stadium with an artificial turf and a seating capacity of 8,017.

The stadium complex also includes a shopping center, parking garage and auxiliary facilities on an underground level. The shopping center was opened on the 9th of November 2023.

== Construction ==
As the 2010s began, the previous stadium in Tammela no longer met the requirements set by Veikkausliiga, so a replacement was necessary. The city of Tampere held an architecture competition in 2014 in which a proposal called Hattutemppu (‘hat trick’) by JKMM Architects was chosen as the basis for the development project. To help finance the project, the new building would comprise apartments as well as office and retail spaces, in addition to the stadium.

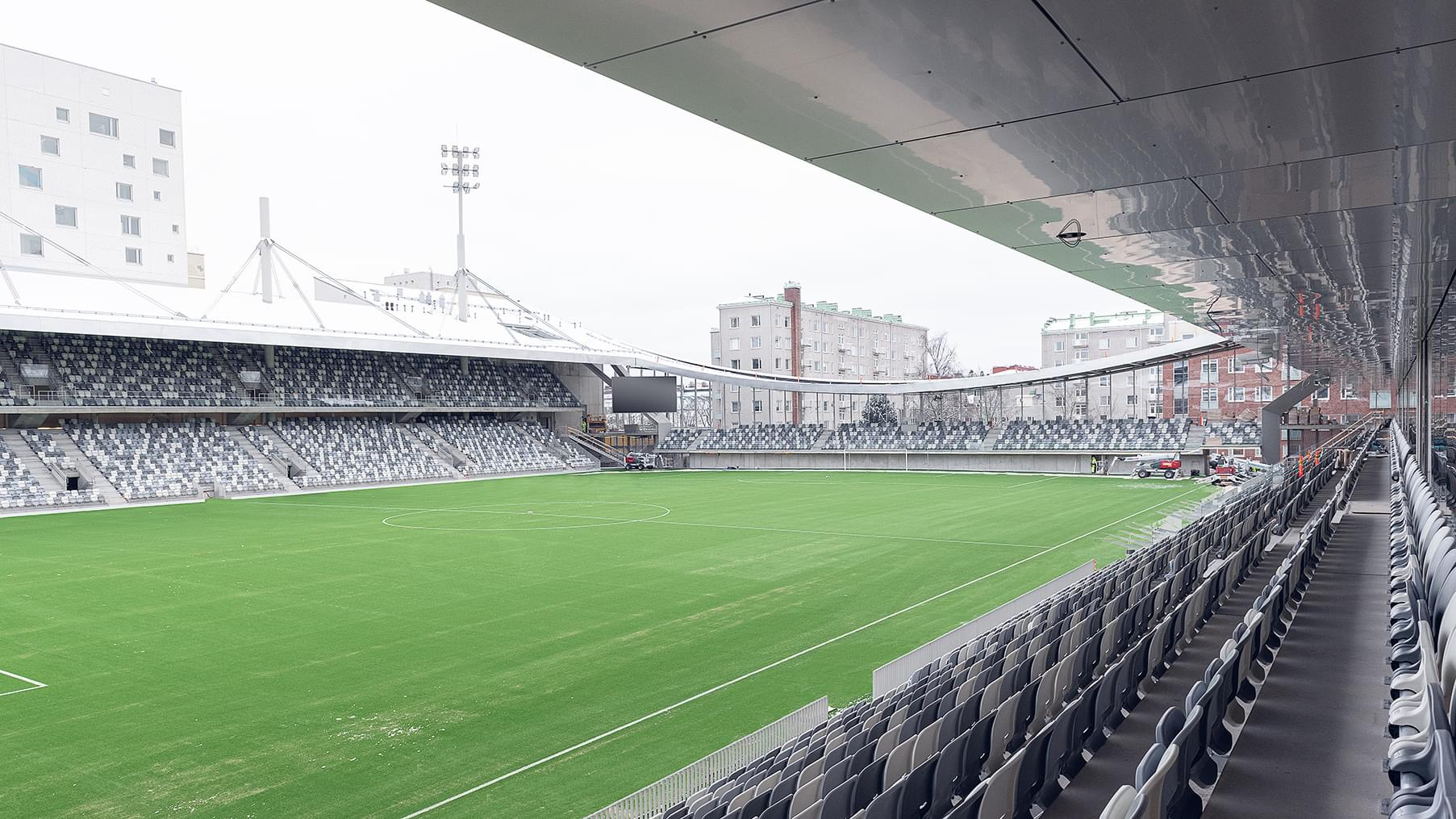
The stadium shortly before opening, in November 2023

The new stadium was originally set to seat approximately 6,500 spectators and meet the UEFA Category 3 criteria. However, in December 2020, the city council decided to increase allocated funding so that the stadium would have 8,000 seats and meet the criteria for Category 4, which makes it eligible for top-level international football matches.

The building won the prestigious Finlandia Prize for Architecture in 2024. It was also named the Steel Structure of the Year 2023 by the Finnish Constructional Steelwork Association, and the Concrete Structure of the Year 2024 by the Finnish Concrete Industry Association.

Construction work on the stadium was completed in November 2023 and the first competitive games were held in the pre-season Finnish League Cup. The official premiere was held on 6 April, in the 2024 Veikkausliiga season opening game between Ilves and FC Lahti.

== Transport ==
The stadium is easily accessible by public transport. The easiest way to arrive at the stadium is by tram, with the Sammon aukio stop, shared by both line 1 and line 3 of the Tampere tramway located approximately 80 metres from the stadium entrance. Some bus routes coming into the city from the east also have stop nearby, on Teiskontie.

The distance to the central railway station is about 600 metres, and about 1.6 km to the long-distance bus station.

There is also a taxi stand on Kalevan puistotie on the eastern side of the stadium.

== International Matches ==
Since its opening, Tammelan Stadion has hosted the home matches of the Finland women's national football team and the Finland national under-21 football team.

== Concerts ==
Date	Artist(s)	Tour/Event
29 June 2024	Lauri Tähkä	Näissä juhlissa ei itketä
