= Camilo Speranza =

Uruguayan football manager

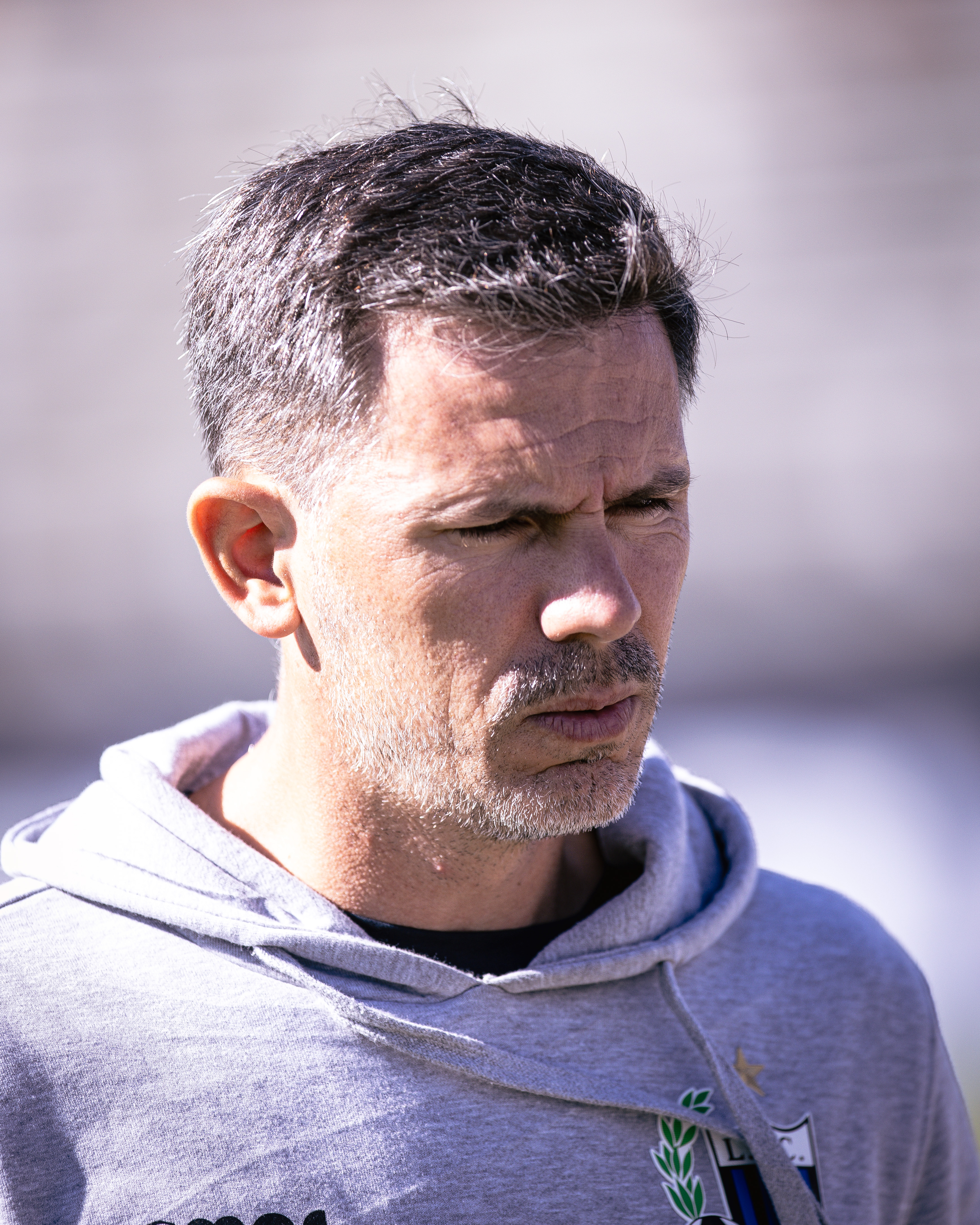
- Speranza in 2026

Personal information
- Full name: Camilo Speranza Borde
- Date of birth: 1 February 1982 (age 44)
- Place of birth: Montevideo, Uruguay

Managerial career
- Years: Team
- 2008–2009: Masnou (assistant)
- 2009–2010: Masnou (youth)
- 2010–2012: Masnou (assistant)
- 2012–2013: PB Sant Cugat (youth)
- 2012–2013: Olesa Montserrat (assistant)
- 2013–2015: Sant Cugat Esport
- 2018–2019: Auckland City (youth)
- 2019–2020: Guayaquil City (assistant)
- 2021: Independiente Juniors (assistant)
- 2023: Guayaquil City (assistant)
- 2023–2024: Valladolid (assistant)
- 2025: Watford (assistant)
- 2026: Liverpool Montevideo
- 2026–: Ilves

Camilo Speranza Borde (born 1 February 1982) is a Uruguayan football manager, currently working as the head coach of Ilves in Veikkausliiga.

== Career ==
Born in Montevideo, Speranza moved to Spain at early age and worked at CD Masnou as a youth and assistant manager. On 11 June 2013, after being the manager of PB Sant Cugat's youth teams and an assistant at CF Olesa de Montserrat, he was appointed manager of Sant Cugat Esport FC in the Segona Catalana.

Speranza resigned from Sant Cugat on 20 January 2015, and subsequently joined CE Manresa in August to be a Head of Methodology. Between 2017 and 2018, he worked at FC Barcelona's youth schools in Rio de Janeiro and in Arizona before joining Auckland City FC on 12 October 2018, as the head coach of the National Youth League side.

In June 2019, Speranza left Auckland City to join Ecuadorian side Guayaquil City, as an assistant coach. In 2022, after one year as an assistant at Independiente Juniors, he returned to the Barça Academy and worked in an outpost in Nashville.

In 2023, Speranza returned to Guayaquil City, again as an assistant, before joining Paulo Pezzolano's staff at Real Valladolid in July of that year. He also often worked as an interim manager when Pezzolano was suspended.

In May 2025, Speranza followed Pezzolano to EFL Championship side Watford. He departed the side in October, and became the manager of Liverpool Montevideo on 12 December, replacing Joaquín Papa.

On 6 April 2026, Speranza resigned from Liverpool.

On 6 July 2026, Speranza was announced as the new manager of Finnish club Ilves.

== Honours ==
Auckland City

- National Youth League: 2018
