= Ryynimakkara =

Finnish sausage

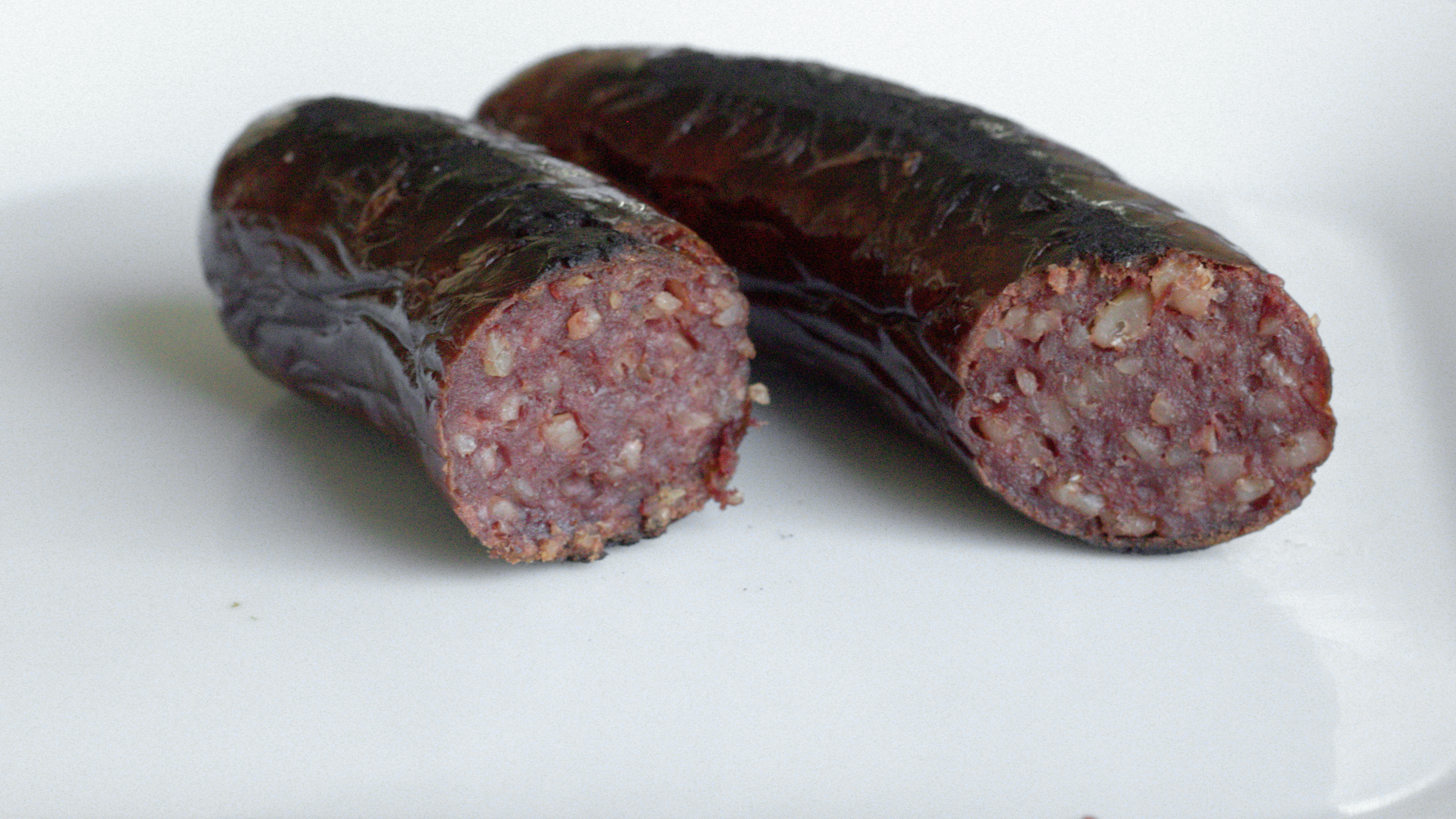
Ryynimakkara

Ryynimakkara (lit. 'groat sausage') is a type of sausage in Finnish cuisine containing groats. Ryynimakkara has barley groats, about one fifth of its weight, lowering its meat and fat content. Also, the fat content is considerably lower than other sausages, usually between 10 and 15%. In some traditional recipes ryynimakkaras are prepared with no meat at all.

The closest relatives to the ryynimakkara are the potato sausage (perunamakkara) from the Häme region of Finland, which has potato instead of the barley groats, blood sausages (verimakkara) and the black sausage (mustamakkara) from Tampere. The use of groats in the ryynimakkara is similar to the British black pudding although its appearance is different, being a thick and small sausage. Also, the Scottish traditional food haggis have some similarities to ryynimakkara, although instead of intestines it is made in the stomach of a sheep.

== See also ==
- Kaszanka
