= Mustamakkara =

Finnish blood sausage

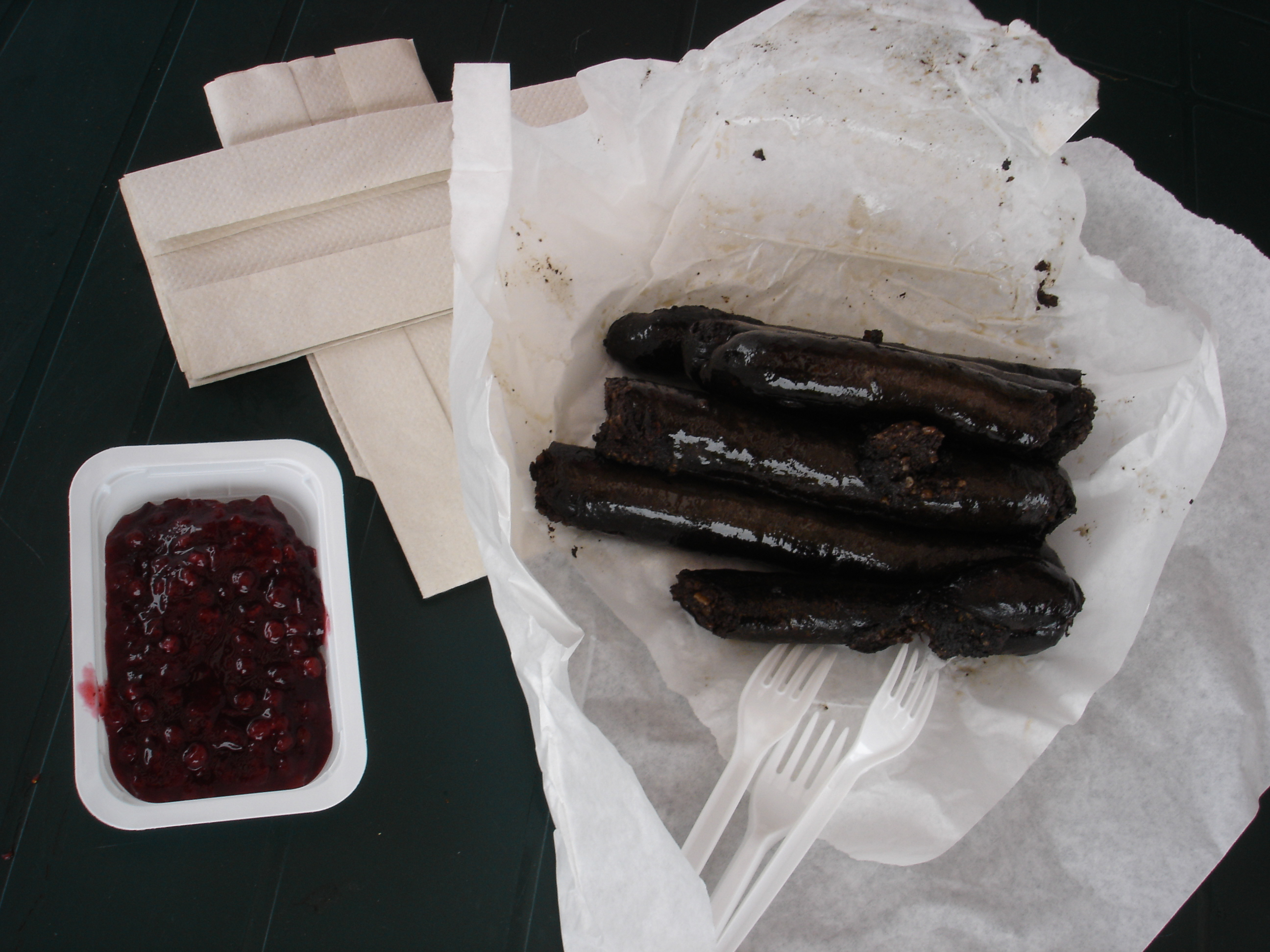
- Mustamakkara with lingonberry jam
- Alternative names: Kuuma sian verimakkara (until the 1980s)
- Type: Sausage
- Place of origin: Finland
- Region or state: Pirkanmaa
- Main ingredients: Pork, pig blood, crushed rye and flour

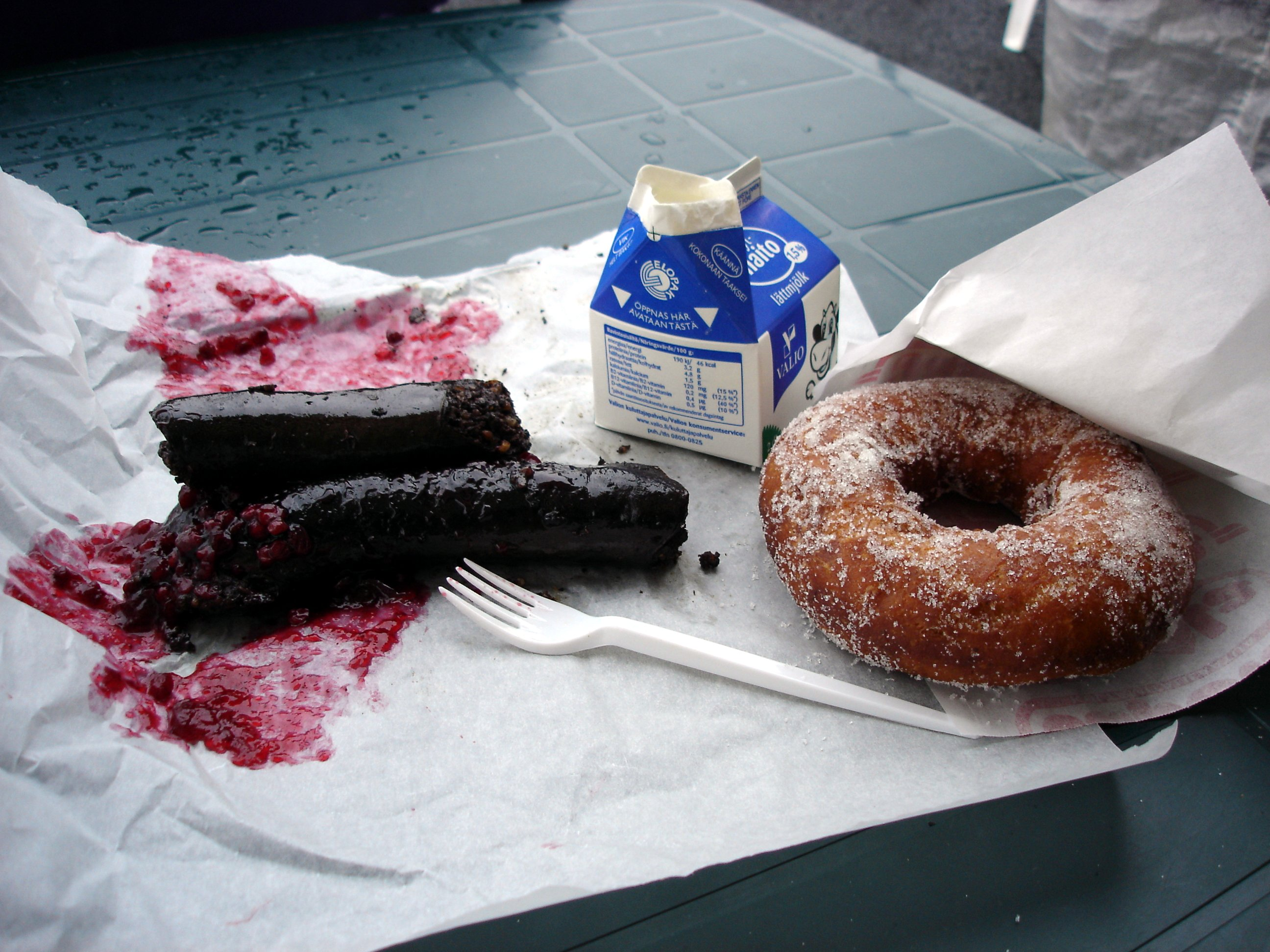
Mustamakkara with lingonberry jam, milk, and a doughnut

Mustamakkara (Finnish pronunciation: [ˈmustɑˌmɑkːɑrɑ], lit. 'black sausage') is a type of Finnish blood sausage traditionally eaten with lingonberry jam. It is available in many stores across Finland, but is considered a specialty of Tampere.

Mustamakkara is known to have been eaten as early as the 17th century and was generally cooked over a small fire, in a hot cauldron, or in an oven. Mustamakkara is made by mixing ground pork, pig blood, crushed rye and flour, after which it is stuffed into a casing of intestine. The two major producers of this food are Tapola and Savupojat.

When buying mustamakkara in the Tampere region, it is customary to specify the monetary amount's worth of sausage one wishes to buy instead of the weight, length or quantity, e.g. "Five euros' worth of black sausage, please". Often people simply point at their preferred piece. The shape and moisture content of mustamakkara varies, and this method allows the buyer to get their preferred piece. An entire sausage can be ordered by requesting a "round trip", menopaluu, which refers to the sausage's U-shape. A traditional location for enjoying mustamakkara is Tammelantori square in the district of Tammela.

Mustamakkara is at its best when bought and eaten fresh at market stalls, to which it is delivered in styrofoam boxes straight from the factories, still piping hot. A typical practice of reheating the sausage is to fry it in a pan.

On his show, Anthony Bourdain: No Reservations, celebrity chef Anthony Bourdain praised mustamakkara, calling it "Good stuff!" Mustamakkara is generally considered to be an acquired taste in Finland.

== See also ==
- Ryynimakkara
