= Martti Halme =

Finnish footballer (born 1943)

Personal information
- Date of birth: 5 April 1943 (age 83)

International career
Years	Team	Apps	(Gls)
1964–1969	Finland	12	(0)

Martti Halme (born 5 April 1943) is a Finnish footballer. He played in 12 matches for the Finland national football team from 1964 to 1969.
