= Tammela, Tampere =

Area of Tampere, Finland

Coordinates: 61.501671°N 23.779611°E

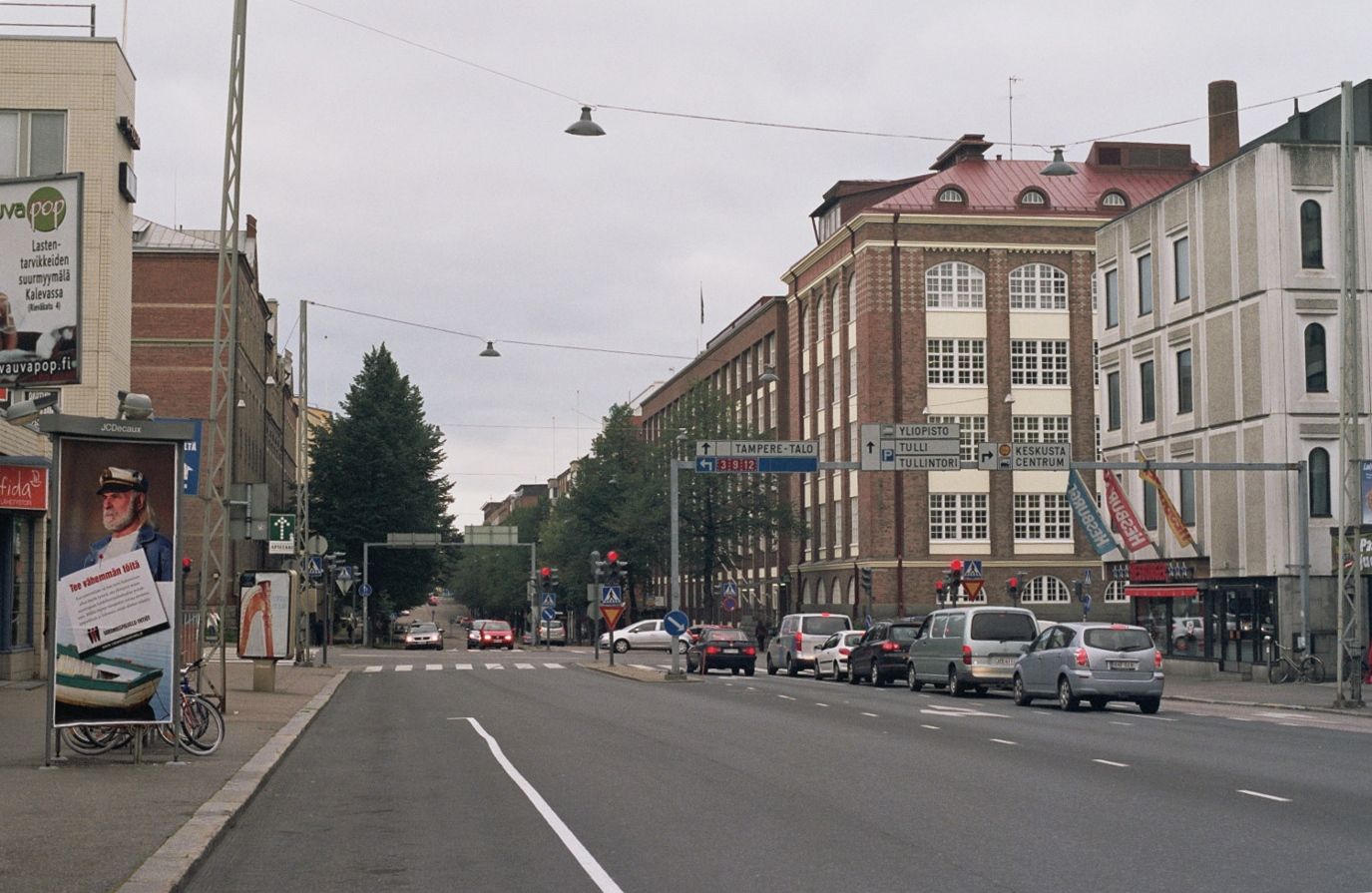
Tammelan puistokatu is the main street of Tammela

Tammela is a district in Tampere, Finland, located east of the city centre. Tammela was born in the 1870s as a working-class neighbourhood, today it is especially popular among the students of the nearby Tampere University. As of 2014, the population of Tammela was 5,646.

Tammela was almost completely destroyed in the 1918 Finnish Civil War Battle of Tampere and also severely damaged in the air raids of World War II. Some wooden houses from the early 1900s have remained in the so-called Puu-Tammela area in the eastern side of the district. Today Tammela is known for the Tammelantori Market Square and its mustamakkara kiosks, and the Tammela Football Stadium.
