= Tammelantori =

Market square in Tammela in Tampere, Finland

Coordinates: 61°30.10′N 23°46.73′E

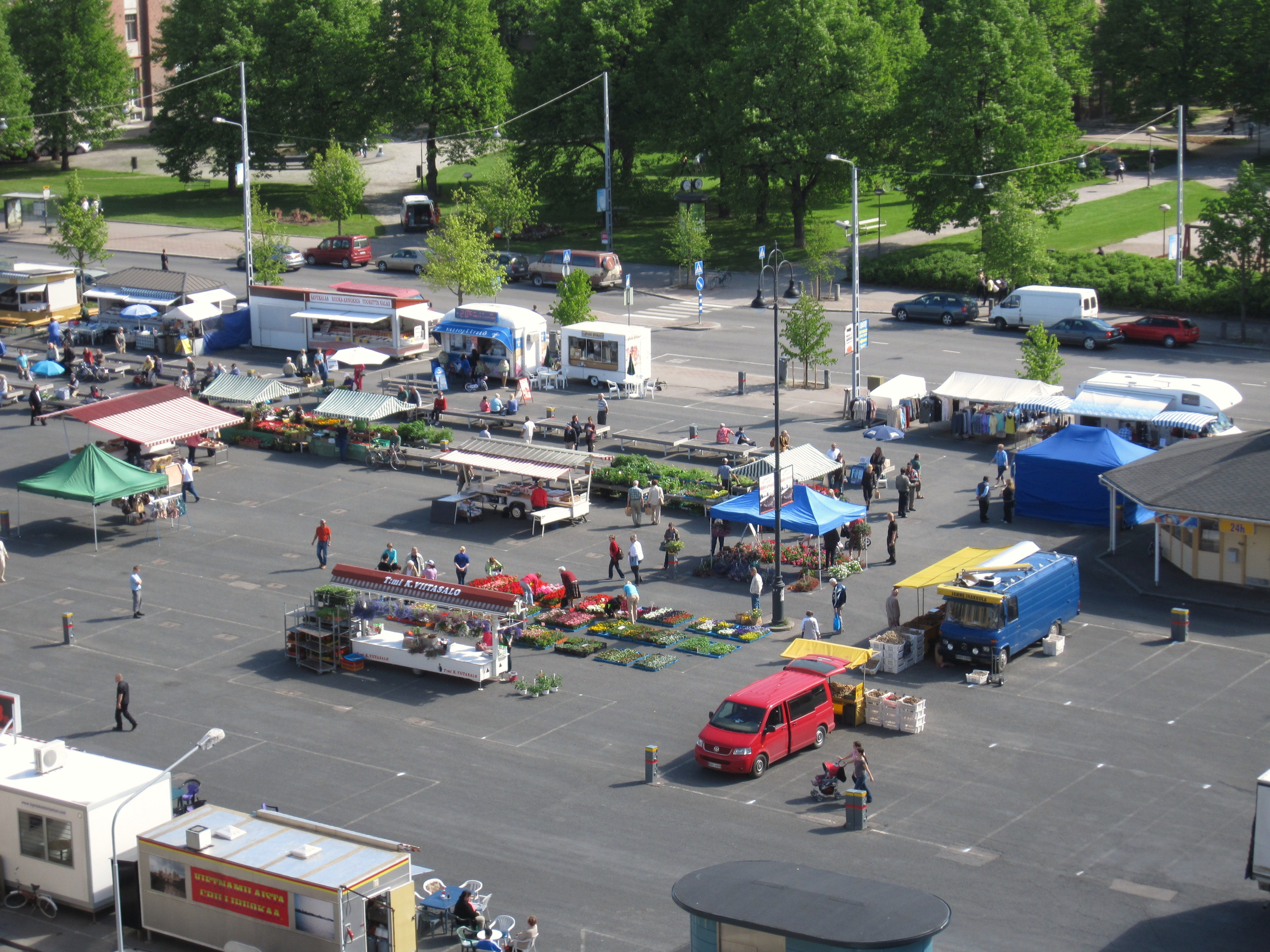
An aerial view of Tammelantori

Tammelantori is a market square in the Tammela district in the center of Tampere in Pirkanmaa, Finland. It is one of Tampere's most significant marketplaces, which is very popular, especially during the summer. The market is very famous for its cafes and mustamakkara kiosks.

== History ==
As late as the late 19th century, the market place was the city's rental field. However, the town plan for Tammela, which includes the current Tammelantori, was drawn up as early as 1887, and the market was opened on July 7, 1900. At the time, little was for sale: sheet metal, wood, porcelain, glass, footwear, fabrics, clothing, animal feed, hay and straw. Many families in Tammela bought almost everything they needed from Tammelantori.

In 1899, the western side of the market area was paved with cobblestones, while the eastern side of the market area remained natural terrain until 1932. Tammelantori was paved with asphalt in 1936–1937. Mustamakkara, a black-colored blood sausage, began to be sold in the market at least from the beginning of the 1920s, and at the same time the first fixed sales tables came to the market.

Today, the market is Tampere's only year-round market, and it has a large flea market every Saturday. Sellers of agricultural products regularly come to the market all over Pirkanmaa, many from Satakunta.

== Gallery ==
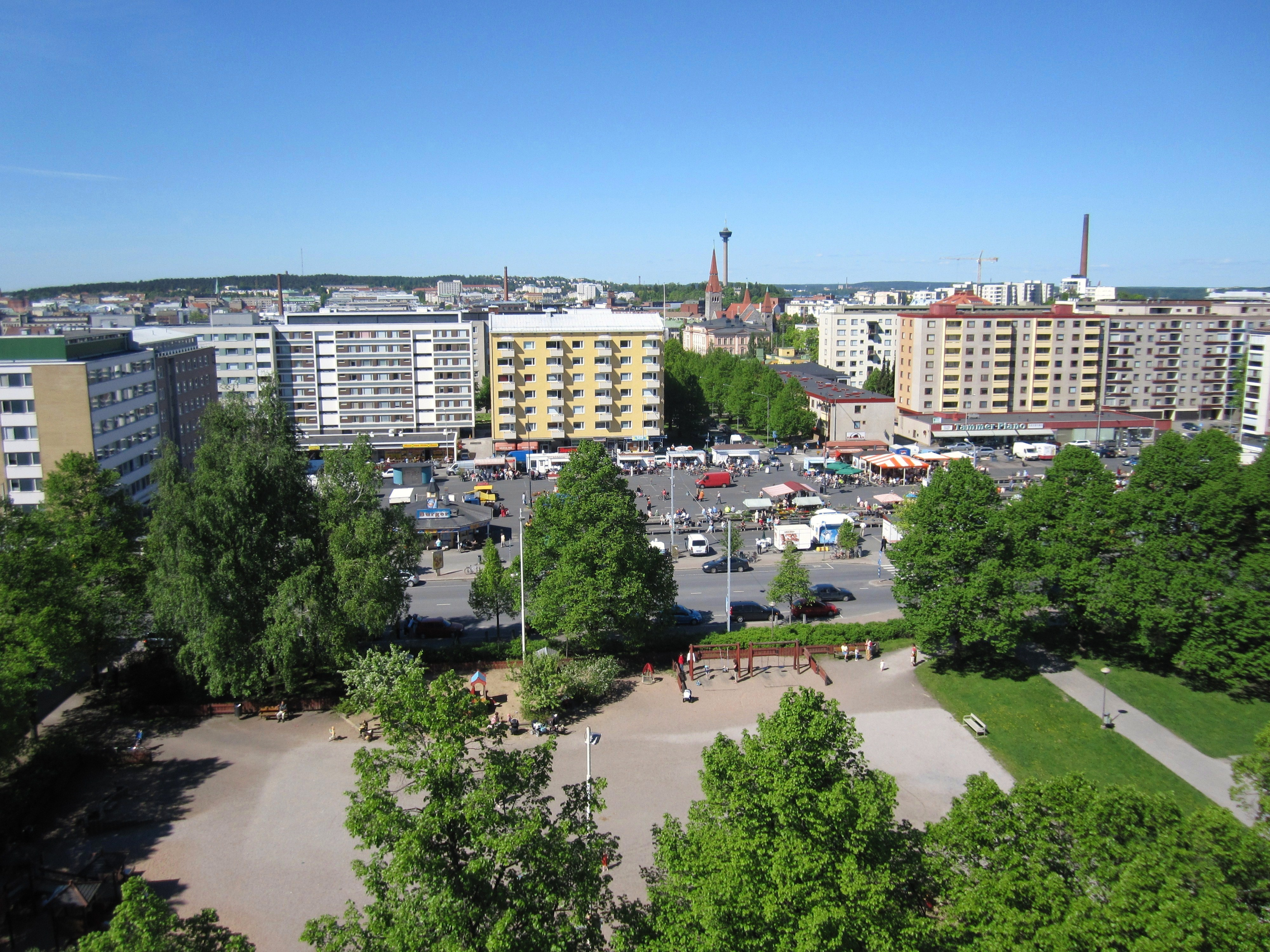
Tammelantori viewed from the east

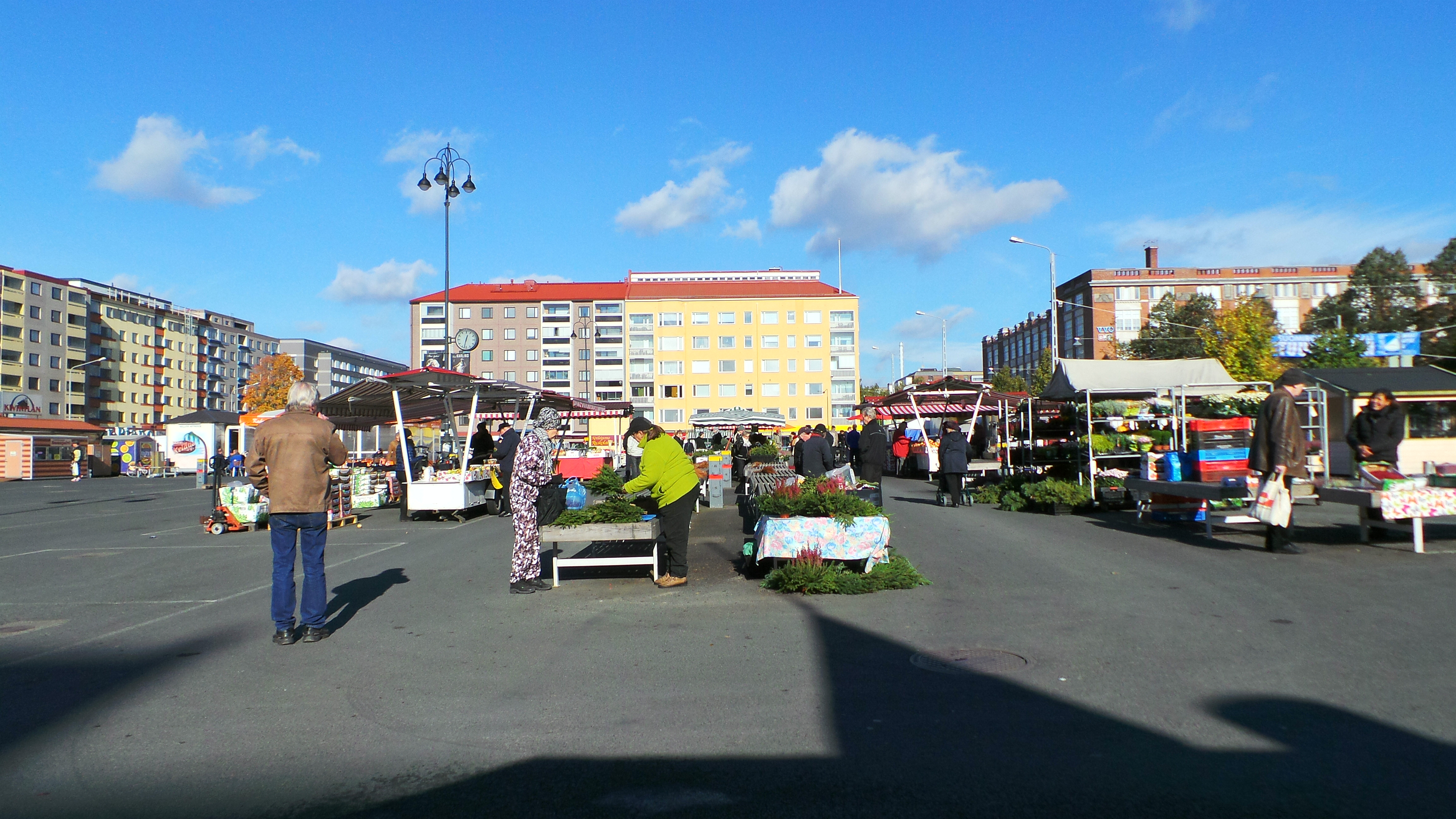
Tammelantori in October 2013

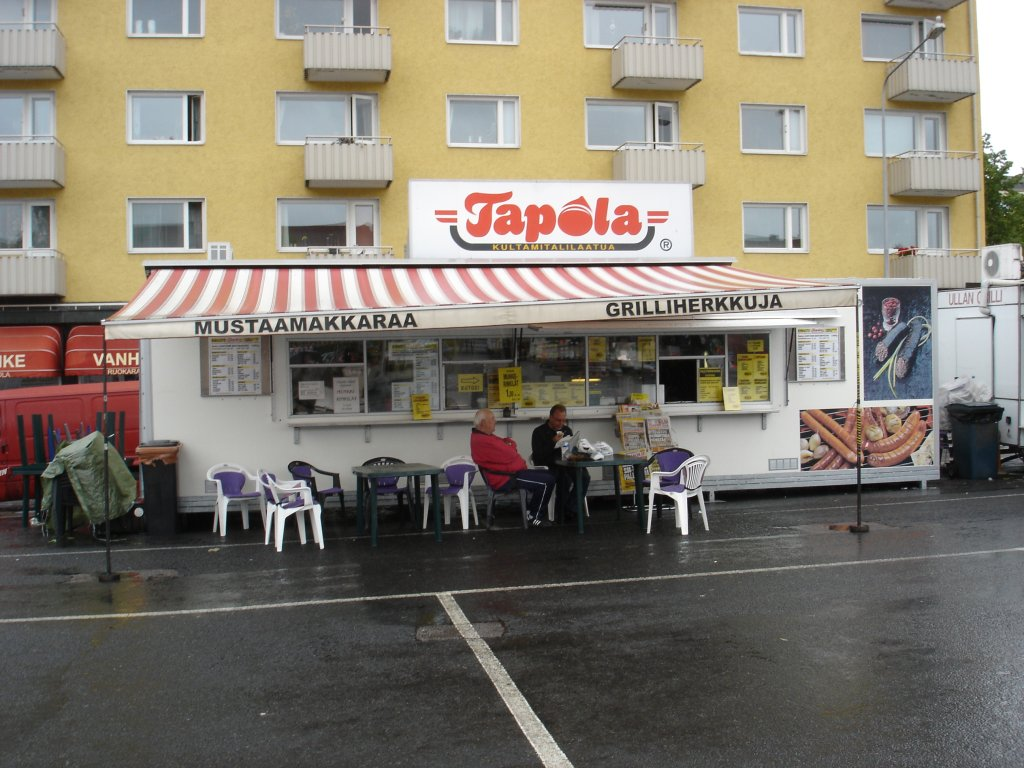
Tapola's mustamakkara kiosk in Tammelantori

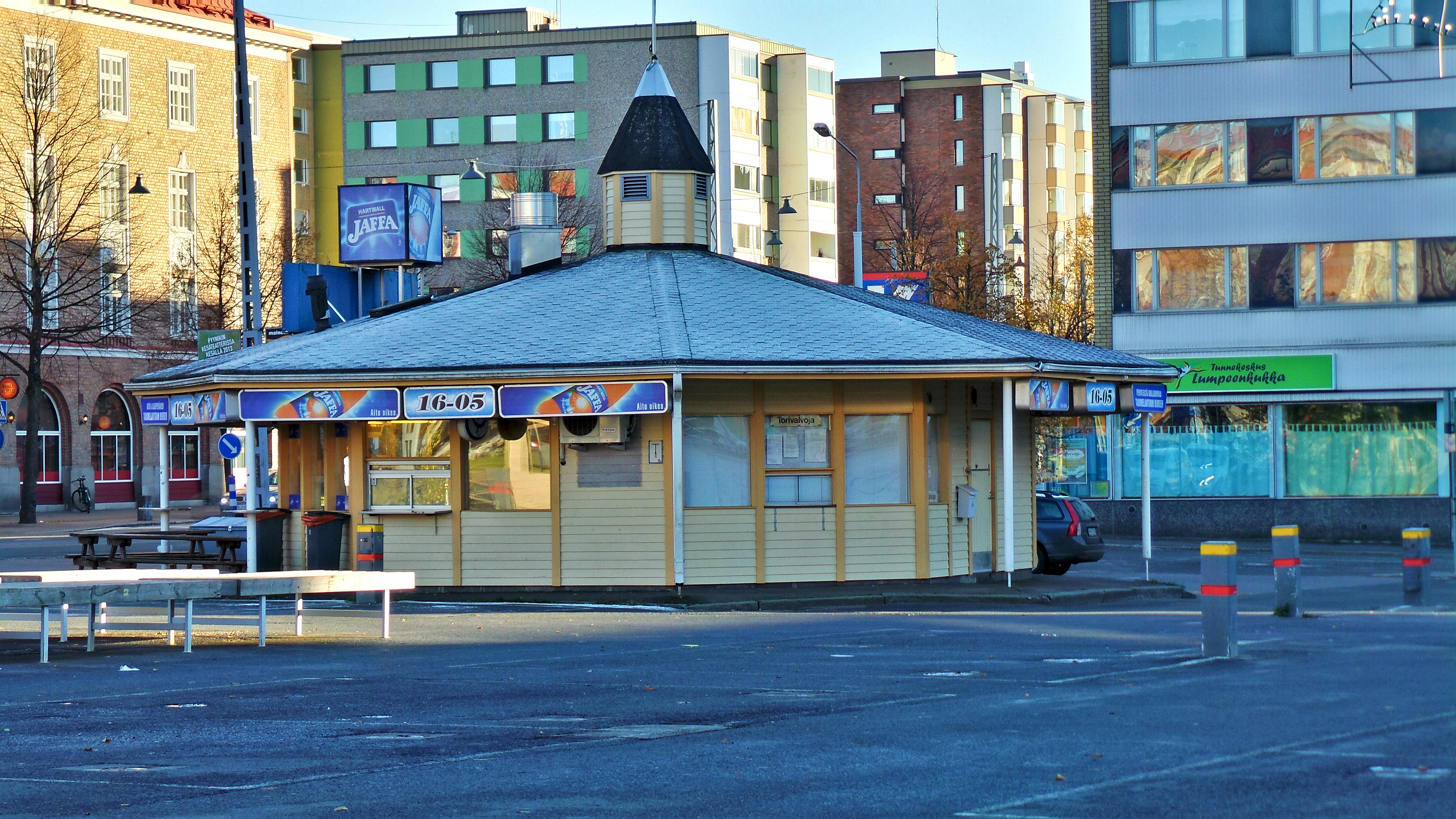
Hamburger stand in Tammelantori

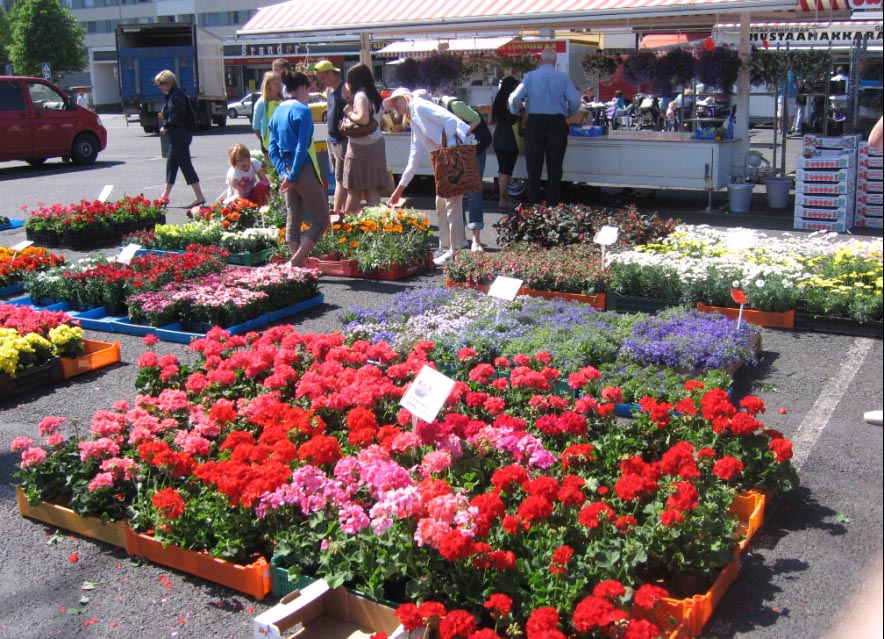
Flowers in Tammelantori

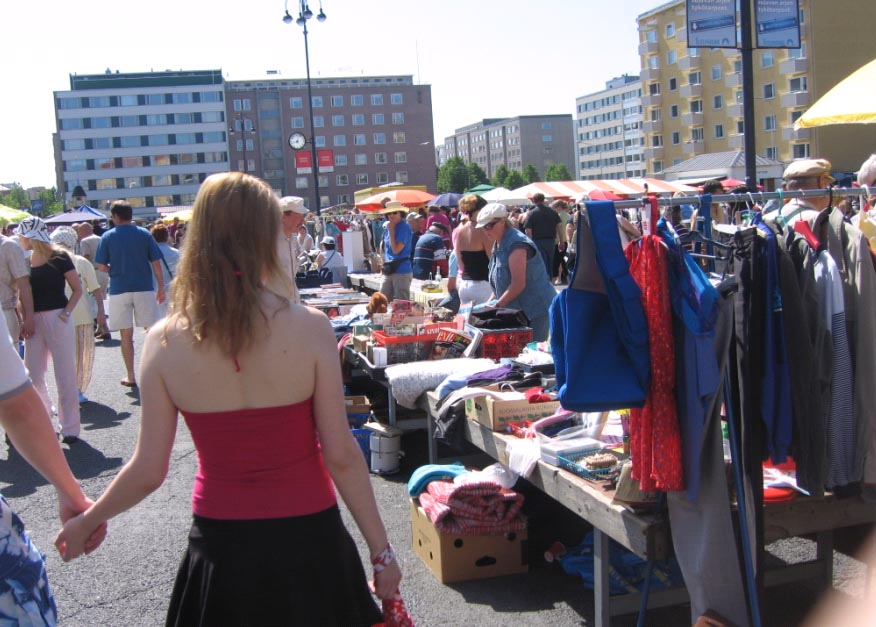
A flea market of Tammelantori in August 2009

== See also ==
- Laukontori
- Tampere Central Square
