= 2013 Veikkausliiga =

Veikkausliiga
- Season: 2013
- Champions: HJK; 10th Veikkausliiga title 26th Finnish title
- Relegated: JJK
- Champions League: HJK Helsinki
- Europa League: FC Honka; VPS; MYPA; RoPS
- Matches: 198
- Goals: 525 (2.65 per match)
- Top goalscorer: Tim Väyrynen (17 goals)
- Biggest home win: HJK 6–0 FC Inter (13 June); FF Jaro 7–1 FC Lahti (13 July)
- Biggest away win: IFK Mariehamn 0–5 HJK (27 June)
- Highest scoring: FF Jaro 7–1 FC Lahti (13 July)

The 2013 Veikkausliiga was the 83rd season of top-tier football in Finland. The season began on 13 April 2013 and ended on 26 October 2013. HJK Helsinki are the defending champions.

== Teams ==
FC Haka were relegated to Ykkönen after finishing at the bottom of the 2012 season. Their place was taken by Ykkönen champions RoPS.

=== Team summaries ===
Location of teams in 2013 Veikkausliiga

| Club | Location | Stadium | Capacity | Manager | Captain |
|---|---|---|---|---|---|
| FC Honka | Espoo | Tapiolan Urheilupuisto | 6,000 | (Finland) Mika Lehkosuo | (Finland) Jussi Vasara |
| FC Inter | Turku | Veritas Stadion | 10,000 | (Netherlands) Job Dragtsma | (Finland) Henri Lehtonen |
| FC Lahti | Lahti | Lahden Stadion | 15,000 | (Finland) Juha Malinen | (Finland) Mikko Hauhia |
| FF Jaro | Jakobstad | Jakobstads Centralplan | 5,000 | (Finland) (Russia) Alexei Eremenko Sr. | (Finland) Jonas Emet |
| HJK | Helsinki | Sonera Stadium | 10,770 | (Finland) Sixten Boström | (Finland) Ville Wallén |
| IFK Mariehamn | Mariehamn | Wiklöf Holding Arena | 4,000 | (Finland) Pekka Lyyski | (Finland) Jani Lyyski |
| JJK | Jyväskylä | Harjun stadion | 3,000 | (Finland) Juha Pasoja | (Finland) Janne Korhonen |
| KuPS | Kuopio | Savon Sanomat Areena | 5,000 | (Finland) Esa Pekonen | (Finland) Rami Hakanpää |
| MYPA | Myllykoski, Kouvola | Kymenlaakson Sähkö Stadion | 4,167 | (Finland) Toni Korkeakunnas | (Finland) Tuomas Aho |
| RoPS | Rovaniemi | Rovaniemen keskuskenttä | 4,000 | (Finland) Kari Virtanen | (Finland) Antti Okkonen |
| TPS | Turku | Veritas Stadion | 10,000 | (Finland) Marko Rajamäki | (Finland) Jarkko Hurme |
| VPS | Vaasa | Hietalahti Stadium | 4,600 | (Finland) Olli Huttunen | (Finland) Sebastian Strandvall |

=== Managerial changes ===
| Team | Outgoing manager | Manner of departure | Date of vacancy | Incoming manager | Date of appointment | Table |
|---|---|---|---|---|---|---|
| HJK | (Finland) Antti Muurinen | End of contract | n/a | (Finland) Sixten Boström | 1 January 2013 | Pre-season |
| FC Lahti | (Finland) Tommi Kautonen | Sacked | 4 June 2013 | (Finland) Juha Malinen | 5 June 2013 | 12th |
| JJK | (Finland) Kari Martonen | Sacked | 30 June 2013 | (Finland) Juha Pasoja (as caretaker) | 30 June 2013 | 12th |

== League table ==
| Pos | Team | Pld | W | D | L | GF | GA | GD | Pts | Qualification or relegation |
|---|---|---|---|---|---|---|---|---|---|---|
| 1 | HJK (C) | 33 | 22 | 7 | 4 | 78 | 25 | +53 | 73 | Qualification to Champions League second qualifying round |
| 2 | FC Honka | 33 | 18 | 7 | 8 | 51 | 37 | +14 | 61 | Qualification to Europa League first qualifying round |
| 3 | VPS | 33 | 14 | 9 | 10 | 41 | 39 | +2 | 51 | Qualification to Europa League first qualifying round |
| 4 | IFK Mariehamn | 33 | 14 | 7 | 12 | 57 | 62 | −5 | 49 | |
| 5 | FC Lahti | 33 | 15 | 3 | 15 | 47 | 49 | −2 | 48 | |
| 6 | MYPA | 33 | 14 | 5 | 14 | 42 | 37 | +5 | 47 | Qualification to Europa League first qualifying round (Note: MYPA qualified for the first qualifying round of the UEFA Europa League by Fair-Play ranking.) |
| 7 | KuPS | 33 | 11 | 8 | 14 | 43 | 42 | +1 | 41 | |
| 8 | TPS | 33 | 10 | 11 | 12 | 42 | 46 | −4 | 41 | |
| 9 | FC Inter | 33 | 9 | 13 | 11 | 31 | 38 | −7 | 40 | |
| 10 | FF Jaro | 33 | 9 | 10 | 14 | 41 | 50 | −9 | 37 | |
| 11 | RoPS | 33 | 8 | 10 | 15 | 25 | 36 | −11 | 34 | Qualification to Europa League second qualifying round (Note: RoPS qualified for the second qualifying round of the UEFA Europa League by winning the 2013 Finnish Cup.) |
| 12 | JJK (R) | 33 | 4 | 10 | 19 | 27 | 64 | −37 | 22 | Relegation to Ykkönen |

Source: veikkausliiga.com
Rules for classification: 1) points; 2) goal difference; 3) number of goals scored.
(C) Champions; (R) Relegated

== Results ==
=== Matches 1–22 ===
| Home \ Away | HON | INT | LAH | JAR | HJK | MAR | JJK | KPS | MYP | RPS | TPS | VPS |
|---|---|---|---|---|---|---|---|---|---|---|---|---|
| FC Honka | | 0–0 | 1–0 | 4–2 | 0–2 | 2–1 | 3–2 | 1–0 | 2–0 | 2–0 | 2–1 | 3–0 |
| FC Inter | 0–1 | | 2–0 | 1–0 | 2–2 | 0–2 | 3–1 | 2–2 | 0–0 | 0–0 | 1–1 | 0–0 |
| FC Lahti | 0–1 | 1–0 | | 1–2 | 0–1 | 2–1 | 2–1 | 1–0 | 3–0 | 0–0 | 0–1 | 0–2 |
| FF Jaro | 2–2 | 0–0 | 7–1 | | 2–3 | 1–2 | 3–0 | 2–1 | 2–0 | 2–1 | 1–1 | 2–1 |
| HJK | 4–2 | 6–0 | 2–1 | 0–0 | | 0–0 | 2–0 | 1–2 | 2–0 | 2–0 | 0–2 | 1–2 |
| IFK Mariehamn | 1–4 | 1–2 | 2–2 | 1–0 | 0–5 | | 2–2 | 4–2 | 0–4 | 1–0 | 2–0 | 0–1 |
| JJK | 1–0 | 2–0 | 0–0 | 0–0 | 1–3 | 3–2 | | 0–0 | 0–3 | 1–1 | 1–1 | 0–1 |
| KuPS | 1–2 | 1–1 | 0–1 | 3–0 | 0–0 | 0–1 | 2–1 | | 1–1 | 1–0 | 4–1 | 1–0 |
| MYPA | 1–0 | 1–0 | 2–0 | 1–2 | 2–4 | 3–1 | 0–1 | 2–0 | | 0–1 | 2–1 | 3–0 |
| RoPS | 0–1 | 1–0 | 3–0 (Note: The match originally finished 1–1, but FC Lahti fielded an ineligible player.) | 0–0 | 0–0 | 1–3 | 4–0 | 1–0 | 2–1 | | 1–0 | 0–0 |
| TPS | 2–0 | 2–1 | 1–2 | 2–2 | 0–3 | 2–4 | 1–0 | 0–0 | 1–2 | 2–1 | | 0–1 |
| VPS | 0–0 | 1–2 | 0–3 | 2–1 | 1–1 | 2–2 | 1–0 | 1–2 | 4–1 | 3–1 | 0–0 | |

Source: veikkausliiga.com
Legend: Blue = home team win; Yellow = draw; Red = away team win.

=== Matches 23–33 ===
| Home \ Away | HON | INT | LAH | JAR | HJK | MAR | JJK | KPS | MYP | RPS | TPS | VPS |
|---|---|---|---|---|---|---|---|---|---|---|---|---|
| FC Honka | | | 4–2 | | 1–0 | | 3–3 | 2–4 | | 0–0 | | |
| FC Inter | 1–2 | | 1–3 | 1–0 | 1–1 | | 2–0 | | | | | 1–2 |
| FC Lahti | | | | 5–2 | 0–2 | 5–1 | | 2–0 | | 2–3 | 3–2 | |
| FF Jaro | 1–3 | | | | 1–5 | | | 2–2 | | 2–0 | 0–3 | |
| HJK | | | | | | 6–1 | | 4–2 | 2–1 | 3–0 | 3–1 | 3–0 |
| IFK Mariehamn | 3–2 | 1–1 | | 0–0 | | | 4–1 | | 3–2 | | | 4–1 |
| JJK | | | 2–3 | 0–0 | 0–5 | | | 0–4 | | | | 1–3 |
| KuPS | | 1–2 | | | | 3–2 | | | 0–2 | 2–0 | 1–1 | |
| MYPA | 0–0 | 1–1 | 0–1 | 1–0 | | | 3–0 | | | | | 1–1 |
| RoPS | | 1–2 | | | | 0–2 | 1–1 | | 0–1 | | 1–1 | |
| TPS | 2–0 | 1–1 | | | | 3–3 | 2–2 | | 2–1 | | | 2–1 |
| VPS | 1–1 | | 3–1 | 3–0 | | | | 2–1 | | 1–1 | | |

Source: veikkausliiga.com
Legend: Blue = home team win; Yellow = draw; Red = away team win.

== Statistics ==
=== Top scorers ===
Source: veikkausliiga.com (in Finnish)

| Rank | Player | Club | Goals |
|---|---|---|---|
| 1 | (Finland) Tim Väyrynen | FC Honka | 17 |
| 2 | (Brazil) Rafael | FC Lahti | 16 |
| 3 | (Finland) Mikael Forssell | HJK | 14 |
| 4 | (Finland) Pekka Sihvola | MYPA | 12 |
| 4 | (Finland) Ilja Venäläinen | KuPS | 12 |
| 6 | (The Gambia) Demba Savage | HJK | 11 |
| 6 | (Finland) Erfan Zeneli | HJK | 11 |
| 8 | (England) Tomi Ameobi | VPS | 9 |
| 8 | (New Zealand) Kris Bright | IFK Mariehamn | 9 |
| 8 | (Finland) Jonas Emet | FF Jaro | 9 |
| 8 | (Georgia (country)) Irakli Sirbiladze | FC Inter | 9 |
| 12 | (Finland) Sasha Anttilainen | MYPA | 8 |
| 12 | (Jamaica) Dever Orgill | IFK Mariehamn | 8 |
| 12 | (Trinidad and Tobago) Shahdon Winchester | FF Jaro | 8 |
| 15 | 8 players | | 7 |
| 23 | 4 players | | 6 |
| 27 | 12 players | | 5 |
| 39 | 13 players | | 4 |
| 52 | 25 players | | 3 |
| 77 | 29 players | | 2 |
| 106 | 36 players | | 1 |

== Monthly awards ==
| Month | Coach of the Month | Player of the Month |
|---|---|---|
| April | (Finland) Pekka Lyyski (IFK Mariehamn) | (Finland) Petteri Forsell (IFK Mariehamn) |
| May | (Finland) Mika Lehkosuo (FC Honka) | (Finland) Pekka Sihvola (MYPA) |
| June | (Finland) Mika Lehkosuo (FC Honka) | (Finland) Tim Väyrynen (FC Honka) |
| July | (Finland) (Russia) Alexei Eremenko Sr. (FF Jaro) | (Finland) Tomi Maanoja (RoPS) |
| August | (Finland) Toni Korkeakunnas (MYPA) | (Ivory Coast) Abdoulaye Méïté (FC Honka) |
| September | (Finland) Sixten Boström (HJK) | (Finland) Erfan Zeneli (HJK) |
| October | (Finland) Olli Huttunen (VPS) | (Finland) Tim Väyrynen (FC Honka) |

== Annual awards ==
Source: Kauden 2013 pelipaikkojen parhaat nimetty (in Finnish)

| Position | Player |
|---|---|
| Best Player | (Finland) Tim Väyrynen (FC Honka) |
| Best Goalkeeper | (Finland) Henri Sillanpää (VPS) |
| Best Defender | (Ghana) Gideon Baah (FC Honka) |
| Best Midfielder | (Finland) Erfan Zeneli (HJK) |
| Best Striker | (Finland) Tim Väyrynen (FC Honka) |
| Best Manager | (Finland) Olli Huttunen (VPS) |

== Attendances ==
HJK Helsinki, the defending champions, saw significantly more attendees at their games than any other club.

| No. | Club | Average |
|---|---|---|
| 1 | HJK | 5,098 |
| 2 | VPS | 2,668 |
| 3 | JJK | 2,630 |
| 4 | TPS | 2,553 |
| 5 | KuPS | 2,384 |
| 6 | Lahti | 2,217 |
| 7 | Honka | 2,041 |
| 8 | Jaro | 1,743 |
| 9 | Inter Turku | 1,691 |
| 10 | RoPS | 1,654 |
| 11 | MyPa | 1,431 |
| 12 | Mariehamn | 1,300 |

== See also ==
- 2013 Ykkönen
- 2013 Kakkonen
