= 2011 Veikkausliiga =

Veikkausliiga
- Season: 2011
- Champions: HJK; 8th Veikkausliiga title 24th Finnish title
- Relegated: RoPS
- Champions League: HJK
- Europa League: Inter Turku; JJK; KuPS; MYPA
- Matches: 198
- Goals: 599 (3.03 per match)
- Top goalscorer: Timo Furuholm (22 goals)
- Biggest home win: HJK 6–0 TPS (22 June); FF Jaro 8–2 RoPS (29 June); HJK 6–0 FF Jaro (28 September)
- Biggest away win: Haka 0–5 HJK (18 June)
- Highest scoring: FF Jaro 8–2 RoPS (29 June)
- Longest winning run: HJK (10 games)
- Longest unbeaten run: FC Honka (14 games)
- Longest winless run: RoPS (21 games)
- Longest losing run: RoPS (6 games)

The 2011 Veikkausliiga was the 81st season of top-tier football in Finland. It began on 2 May 2011 and ended on 29 October 2011. HJK were the defending champions and successfully defended their title.

The pre-season was severely affected by license revocations to two teams, which eventually resulted in a later than originally scheduled begin date and an increase of scheduled matches from 26 to 33 per team.

== Teams ==
The league was originally supposed to have 14 teams, but AC Oulu was refused a license due to club's bad economic situation and Tampere United was excluded from every official competition of Football Association of Finland due to breaking the rules of the association, and the league will therefore be played with only 12 teams. AC Oulu was, however, obtained a license for Ykkönen, where it will play this season.

FC Lahti were relegated to Ykkönen after finishing at the bottom of the 2010 season. Their place was taken by Ykkönen champions RoPS. 13th-placed Veikkausliiga team JJK and Ykkönen runners-up FC Viikingit competed in a two-legged relegation play-offs for one spot in this season. JJK won 3–1 on aggregate and thereby retained their league position once again.

=== Team summaries ===
Location of teams in 2011 Veikkausliiga

Club	Location	Stadium	Capacity	Manager	Captain
FC Honka	Espoo	Tapiolan Urheilupuisto	6,000	(Finland) Mika Lehkosuo	(Finland) Tomi Maanoja
FC Inter	Turku	Veritas Stadion	10,000	(Netherlands) Job Dragtsma	(Finland) Henri Lehtonen
FF Jaro	Jakobstad	Jakobstads Centralplan	5,000	(Finland) / (Russia) Alexei Eremenko Sr.	(Finland) Heikki Aho
Haka	Valkeakoski	Tehtaan kenttä	3,516	(Finland) Sami Ristilä	(Haiti) Regillio Nooitmeer
HJK	Helsinki	Sonera Stadium	10,770	(Finland) Antti Muurinen	(Finland) Ville Wallén
JJK	Jyväskylä	Harjun stadion	3,000	(Finland) Kari Martonen	(Finland) Mikko Hyyrynen
KuPS	Kuopio	Kuopion keskuskenttä	5,000	(Finland) Esa Pekonen	(Finland) Pietari Holopainen
IFK Mariehamn	Mariehamn	Wiklöf Holding Arena	4,000	(Finland) Pekka Lyyski	(Denmark) Allan Olesen
MYPA	Myllykoski, Kouvola	Saviniemi	4,167	(Finland) Toni Korkeakunnas	(Finland) Tuomas Aho
RoPS	Rovaniemi	Rovaniemen keskuskenttä	4,000	(Finland) Matti Hiukka	(Finland) Tuomo Könönen
TPS	Turku	Veritas Stadion	10,000	(Finland) Marko Rajamäki	(Finland) Jarno Heinikangas
VPS	Vaasa	Hietalahti Stadium	4,600	(Finland) Petri Vuorinen	(Finland) Tero Koskela

=== Managerial changes ===
Team	Outgoing manager	Manner of departure	Date of vacancy	Incoming manager	Date of appointment	Table
VPS	(Finland) Tommi Pikkarainen	Resigned	28 July 2011	(Finland) Petri Vuorinen	28 July 2011	11th
RoPS	(Wales) John Allen	Sacked	8 August 2011	(Finland) Matti Hiukka	8 August 2011	12th

== League table ==
Pos	Team	Pld	W	D	L	GF	GA	GD	Pts	Qualification or relegation
1	HJK (C)	33	26	3	4	86	23	+63	81	Qualification to Champions League second qualifying round
2	FC Inter	33	16	9	8	70	44	+26	57	Qualification to Europa League second qualifying round (Note: HJK won the 2011 Finnish Cup competition. Because they won the league, they will enter the second qualifying round of UEFA Champions League and their cup winner spot in UEFA Europa League will be given to the league runners-up. KuPS qualify for the first qualifying round of UEFA Europa League as cup runners-up.)
3	JJK	33	14	12	7	60	48	+12	54	Qualification to Europa League first qualifying round
4	FC Honka	33	13	14	6	57	40	+17	53	
5	TPS	33	13	11	9	48	44	+4	50	
6	KuPS	33	10	10	13	44	55	−11	40	Qualification to Europa League first qualifying round
7	IFK Mariehamn	33	10	8	15	39	47	−8	38	
8	MYPA	33	11	5	17	39	52	−13	38	Qualification to Europa League first qualifying round (Note: MYPA qualify for the first qualifying round of UEFA Europa League via Fair Play ranking.)
9	VPS	33	8	13	12	32	44	−12	37	
10	Haka	33	10	7	16	36	60	−24	37	
11	FF Jaro	33	7	10	16	49	64	−15	31	
12	RoPS (R)	33	5	8	20	39	78	−39	23	Relegation to Ykkönen

Source: soccerway.com
Rules for classification: 1) points; 2) goal difference; 3) number of goals scored.
(C) Champions; (R) Relegated

== Results ==
As a consequence of the decreased number of teams immediately prior to the start of the season, the schedule for this season had to be significantly altered. Teams will now play each other a third time after a regular double-round robin schedule; each team will hence play a total of 33 matches. The schedule for the additional round of matches was determined by the final positions of the 2010 season, with the best six teams being assigned an extra home match in the process.

=== Matches 1–22 ===
Home \ Away	HAK	HJK	HON	INT	JAR	JJK	KPS	MAR	MYP	RPS	TPS	VPS
Haka		0–5	2–2	2–0	3–1	0–2	1–0	0–2	1–2	2–0	0–1	0–0
HJK	5–2		2–1	1–0	1–0	6–2	4–1	1–0	4–1	5–1	6–0	3–0
FC Honka	1–1	0–2		2–3	4–1	0–0	3–1	2–0	1–1	1–0	1–2	1–1
FC Inter	6–1	1–1	4–0		2–0	2–0	4–4	2–0	1–1	3–0	0–0	3–1
FF Jaro	1–2	1–0	2–2	1–3		1–1	1–1	4–0	1–5	8–2	1–1	2–0
JJK	4–2	0–2	2–2	1–0	3–3		2–0	2–1	1–0	3–0	1–1	2–0
KuPS	1–2	2–4	0–2	0–1	1–1	4–4		2–1	2–0	1–0	1–1	2–1
IFK Mariehamn	2–1	2–0	1–0	1–0	3–1	2–2	2–2		1–1	3–3	0–1	0–1
MYPA	3–0	0–2	0–1	2–3	2–1	2–1	1–0	0–2		0–4	0–0	1–0
RoPS	1–2	1–4	1–2	3–4	1–0	1–2	0–0	1–1	2–1		1–1	1–1
TPS	2–0	2–0	2–4	2–1	1–3	2–3	5–0	2–0	2–1	2–1		1–1
VPS	1–1	0–2	1–1	3–3	0–0	1–1	1–1	1–0	1–2	2–1	2–1	

Source: Soccerway
Legend: Blue = home team win; Yellow = draw; Red = away team win.

=== Matches 23–33 ===
Home \ Away	HAK	HJK	HON	INT	JAR	JJK	KPS	MAR	MYP	RPS	TPS	VPS
Haka		1–3	0–4				2–1	1–1		0–1		
HJK				4–2	6–0	0–0	1–0			5–0		2–0
FC Honka		1–1			1–1	2–2			2–0	5–2	1–1	
FC Inter	1–1		2–2			2–1		2–0	5–2	6–2		
FF Jaro	1–1			3–2		2–3	1–1		2–4			0–1
JJK	2–1						1–2	2–0	4–0			1–2
KuPS			1–4	2–1				2–1	2–0		2–0	4–2
IFK Mariehamn		0–2	1–1		5–2					5–2	0–3	
MYPA	2–0	0–1						0–1		2–0		2–3
RoPS					0–2	3–3	1–1				3–1	0–0
TPS	1–2	2–1		1–1	2–1	2–2			1–1			
VPS	1–2		0–1	0–0				1–1			3–2	

Source: Soccerway
Legend: Blue = home team win; Yellow = draw; Red = away team win.

== Statistics ==
Updated to games played on 29 October 2011.

=== Top scorers ===
Source: veikkausliiga.com (in Finnish)

Rank	Player	Club	Goals
1	(Finland) Timo Furuholm	FC Inter	22
2	(Hungary) Tamás Gruborovics	JJK	16
2	(Finland) Mika Ojala	FC Inter	16
2	(Finland) Akseli Pelvas	HJK	16
5	(Finland) Henri Lehtonen	FC Inter	15
5	(Finland) Berat Sadik	HJK	15
5	(The Gambia) Demba Savage	FC Honka	15
8	(Nigeria) Babatunde Wusu	JJK	14
9	(Senegal) Papa Niang	FF Jaro	11
9	(Finland) Teemu Pukki	HJK	11
9	(Finland) Ilja Venäläinen	KuPS	11
9	(Finland) Mika Ääritalo	TPS	11
13	(Mexico) José Manuel Rivera	RoPS	10
14	(Nigeria) Dudu	FC Honka	9
14	(Georgia (country)) Irakli Sirbiladze	FF Jaro	9
14	(Nigeria) Olajide Williams	KuPS	9
17	3 players		8
20	5 players		7
25	12 players		6
37	6 players		5
43	9 players		4
52	20 players		3
72	32 players		2
104	58 players		1

== Monthly awards ==
Month	Coach of the Month	Player of the Month
May	(Netherlands) Job Dragtsma (FC Inter)	(Finland) Timo Furuholm (FC Inter)
June	(Finland) Antti Muurinen (HJK)	(Finland) Mika Ojala (FC Inter)
July	(Finland) Toni Korkeakunnas (MYPA)	(Finland) Mika Ojala (FC Inter)
August	(Finland) Sami Ristilä (Haka)	(Finland) Sampsa Timoska (MYPA)
September	(Finland) Kari Martonen (JJK)	(Finland) Alexander Ring (HJK)
October	(Finland) Mika Lehkosuo (FC Honka)	(Finland) Akseli Pelvas (HJK)

== Players of the year ==
Source: veikkausliiga.com (in Finnish)

Position	Player
Best Goalkeeper	(Finland) Ville Wallén (HJK)
Best Defender	(Finland) Mathias Lindström (HJK)
Best Midfielder	(Finland) Mika Ojala (FC Inter)
Best Striker	(Finland) Timo Furuholm (FC Inter)

== Attendances ==
No.	Club	Average
1	HJK	3,610
2	TPS	3,596
3	JJK	3,512
4	Inter Turku	2,224
5	VPS	2,112
6	KuPS	2,035
7	Honka	1,954
8	Jaro	1,473
9	Mariehamn	1,416
10	RoPS	1,412
11	Haka	1,321
12	MyPa	1,122
