= 2010 Veikkausliiga =

Veikkausliiga
- Season: 2010
- Champions: HJK; 7th Veikkausliiga title 23rd Finnish title
- Relegated: Lahti
- Champions League: HJK
- Europa League: KuPS; TPS (via dom. cup); Honka
- Matches: 182
- Goals: 513 (2.82 per match)
- Top goalscorer: Juho Mäkelä (16 goals)
- Biggest home win: JJK 6–1 Oulu (5 July); Jaro 5-0 Haka (2 August); TPS 5-0 Oulu (22 September)
- Biggest away win: KuPS 0–5 HJK (16 April)
- Highest scoring: KuPS 6–2 TamU (30 June)
- Longest winning run: TPS (5 games) (1 August–28 August)
- Longest unbeaten run: 8 games by 2 teams HJK (24 May–10 July); Tampere United (3 May–20 June)
- Longest winless run: FC Lahti (11 games) (10 May–16 July)
- Longest losing run: AC Oulu (6 games) (19 June–30 July)

The 2010 Veikkausliiga was the 80th season of top-tier football in Finland. It began on 16 April 2010 and ended on 23 October 2010.

== Teams ==
RoPS finished at the bottom of the 2009 season and were relegated to Ykkönen. Their place was taken by Ykkönen champions AC Oulu. 13th-placed Veikkausliiga team JJK and Ykkönen runners-up KPV competed in a two-legged relegation play-offs for one spot in this season. JJK won 5–3 on aggregate and thereby retained their league position.

== Team summaries ==
Location of teams in 2010 Veikkausliiga

Club	Location	Stadium	Capacity	Manager	Kitmaker
AC Oulu	Oulu	Castrén	4,000	(Finland) Juha Malinen	Umbro
FC Honka	Espoo	Tapiolan Urheilupuisto	6,000	(Finland) Mika Lehkosuo	Kappa
FC Inter	Turku	Veritas Stadion	9,372	(Netherlands) Job Dragtsma	Nike
FC Lahti	Lahti	Lahden Stadion	15,000	(Finland) Ilkka Mäkelä	Umbro
FF Jaro	Jakobstad	Jakobstads Centralplan	5,000	(Finland) / (Russia) Alexei Eremenko Sr.	Errea
Haka	Valkeakoski	Tehtaan kenttä	3,516	(Finland) Sami Ristilä	Umbro
HJK	Helsinki	Sonera Stadium	10,770	(Finland) Antti Muurinen	Adidas
IFK Mariehamn	Mariehamn	Wiklöf Holding Arena	4,000	(Finland) Pekka Lyyski	Puma
JJK	Jyväskylä	Harjun stadion	3,000	(Finland) Kari Martonen	Legea
KuPS	Kuopio	Kuopion keskuskenttä	5,000	(Finland) Esa Pekonen	Puma
MYPA	Myllykoski, Kouvola	Saviniemi	4,167	(Finland) Janne Lindberg	Puma
Tampere United	Tampere	Ratina Stadion	17,000	(Finland) Ari Hjelm	Puma
TPS	Turku	Veritas Stadion	9,372	(Finland) Marko Rajamäki	Puma
VPS	Vaasa	Hietalahti Stadium	4,600	(Finland) Tommi Pikkarainen	Umbro

== League table ==
Pos	Team	Pld	W	D	L	GF	GA	GD	Pts	Qualification or relegation
1	HJK (C)	26	15	7	4	43	19	+24	52	Qualification to Champions League second qualifying round
2	KuPS	26	15	3	8	45	36	+9	48	Qualification to Europa League second qualifying round
3	TPS	26	13	6	7	46	30	+16	45	Qualification to Europa League second qualifying round (Note: TPS were the winners of the 2010 Finnish Cup competition and qualified for the second qualifying round of the UEFA Europa League.)
4	FC Honka	26	12	5	9	42	34	+8	41	Qualification to Europa League first qualifying round
5	FF Jaro	26	11	5	10	42	34	+8	38	
6	FC Inter	26	10	7	9	34	32	+2	37	
7	Tampere United	26	10	4	12	37	46	−9	34	Folded as a team, refounded as TamU-K
8	Haka	26	9	6	11	30	38	−8	33	
9	MYPA	26	7	11	8	36	39	−3	32	
10	VPS	26	8	7	11	29	40	−11	31	
11	AC Oulu	26	8	6	12	31	44	−13	30	
12	IFK Mariehamn	26	7	7	12	38	43	−5	28	
13	JJK (O)	26	8	3	15	34	41	−7	27	Qualification to relegation play-offs
14	FC Lahti (R)	26	5	11	10	26	37	−11	26	Relegation to Ykkönen

Source: soccerway.com
Rules for classification: 1) points; 2) goal difference; 3) number of goals scored.
(C) Champions; (O) Play-off winners; (R) Relegated

=== Relegation play-offs ===
The 13th placed team of 2010 Veikkausliiga and the runners-up of the 2010 Ykkönen will compete in a two-legged play-offs for one spot in the 2011 Veikkausliiga. JJK won the playoffs by 3-1 and remained again in Veikkausliiga.

27 October 2010
18:30 EEST

FC Viikingit	1 – 1	JJK
Sesay 87'		Hyyrynen 62'

Vuosaaren Urheilukenttä, Helsinki
Attendance: 3172

30 October 2010
14:00 EEST

JJK	2 – 0	FC Viikingit
Tuomanen 9'; Linjala 31'

Harjun Stadion, Jyväskylä
Attendance: 3232

== Results ==
Home \ Away	HAK	HJK	HON	INT	JAR	JJK	KPS	LAH	MAR	MYP	ACO	TAM	TPS	VPS
Haka		0–3	2–0	1–3	4–3	1–2	2–1	0–0	2–1	0–1	2–0	1–0	0–0	1–1
HJK	1–1		0–1	2–2	2–1	1–0	1–2	0–0	3–1	2–0	2–0	3–1	2–0	3–0
FC Honka	4–2	3–1		1–1	3–1	2–3	2–1	1–2	3–0	3–1	3–4	0–2	1–0	0–0
FC Inter	1–0	0–0	2–0		2–0	3–2	1–3	1–3	1–1	1–1	0–2	0–2	1–2	1–0
FF Jaro	5–0	1–1	0–0	0–1		1–3	0–1	2–0	2–0	3–2	1–2	2–2	1–3	3–2
JJK	1–2	1–2	0–1	0–3	1–2		1–3	2–2	0–2	1–1	6–1	0–1	0–2	0–1
KuPS	1–0	0–5	0–2	2–1	2–1	2–0		1–1	0–0	2–1	3–1	6–2	2–1	1–2
FC Lahti	0–1	0–1	2–4	1–1	1–3	0–0	2–1		1–1	0–2	0–3	0–1	1–3	2–1
IFK Mariehamn	2–3	1–2	2–2	3–0	0–0	3–2	1–2	2–2		1–2	0–2	2–3	2–1	0–3
MYPA	2–1	1–1	2–2	3–2	0–1	2–4	1–1	1–1	2–1		1–1	3–0	2–2	2–2
AC Oulu	1–1	1–1	2–0	1–0	0–1	1–2	2–5	1–2	0–0	1–1		3–0	0–2	1–1
Tampere United	2–1	2–0	2–1	0–1	1–4	0–2	1–3	0–0	3–4	1–1	3–1		1–1	3–0
TPS	1–1	0–1	1–0	2–2	0–3	2–0	3–0	3–2	1–4	3–0	5–0	4–3		1–1
VPS	2–1	0–3	1–3	0–3	1–1	0–1	2–0	1–1	1–4	2–1	2–0	3–1	0–3	

Source: Soccerway
Legend: Blue = home team win; Yellow = draw; Red = away team win.

== Statistics ==
=== Top goalscorers ===
Source: veikkausliiga.com (in Finnish)

Rank	Player	Club	Goals
1	(Finland) Juho Mäkelä	HJK	16
2	(Finland) Roope Riski	TPS	12
3	(Finland) Henri Lehtonen	FC Inter	11
4	(Finland) Tamás Gruborovics	IFK Mariehamn	10
4	(Finland) Jonatan Johansson	TPS	10
6	(Finland) Tommi Kari	JJK	9
6	(Finland) Jami Puustinen	Honka	9
6	(Russia) Maxim Votinov	MYPA	9
9	(Nigeria) Dudu	KuPS	8
9	(Canada) Frank Jonke	Oulu	8
9	(Senegal) Papa Niang	FF Jaro	8
9	(Finland) Mikko Paatelainen	IFK Mariehamn	8

=== Top assistants ===
Source: veikkausliiga.com (in Finnish)

Rank	Player	Club	Assists
1	(Finland) Alexei Eremenko Jr.	FF Jaro	8
2	(Finland) Miikka Ilo	KuPS	7
2	(Finland) Tomi Petrescu	Tampere United	7
4	(Finland) Sasha Anttilainen	IFK Mariehamn	6
4	(Finland) Jonne Hjelm	Tampere United	6
4	(Finland) Antti Hynynen	Haka/KuPS	6
4	(Finland) Tommi Kari	JJK	6
4	(Finland) Mika Lahtinen	JJK	6
4	(Finland) Mikko Manninen	TPS	6
4	(Russia) Maxim Votinov	MYPA	6
11	(Brazil) Dema	Tampere United/HJK	5
11	(Senegal) Papa Niang	FF Jaro	5
11	(Finland) Mika Nurmela	Oulu	5
11	(Finland) Sebastian Strandvall	IFK Mariehamn	5

== Monthly awards ==
Month	Coach of the Month	Player of the Month
April	(Finland) Kari Martonen (JJK)	(Finland) Janne Korhonen (Haka)
May	(Finland) Esa Pekonen (KuPS)	(Finland) Miikka Ilo (KuPS)
June	(Netherlands) Job Dragtsma (FC Inter)	(Finland) Henri Lehtonen (FC Inter)
July	(Finland) Pekka Lyyski (IFK Mariehamn)	(Finland) Tamás Gruborovics (IFK Mariehamn)
August	(Finland) Marko Rajamäki (TPS)	(Finland) Roope Riski (TPS)
September	(Finland) / (Russia) Alexei Eremenko Sr. (FF Jaro)	(Finland) Toni Kolehmainen (TPS)
October	(Finland) Sami Ristilä (Haka)	(Nigeria) Dudu (KuPS)

== Players of the year ==
Position	Player
Best Goalkeeper	(Finland) Jukka Lehtovaara (TPS)
Best Defender	(Finland) Juhani Ojala (HJK)
Best Midfielder	(Finland) Miikka Ilo (KuPS)
Best Striker	(Finland) Juho Mäkelä (HJK)
Best Player	(Finland) Medo (HJK)

== Attendances ==
No.	Club	Average
1	TPS	3,658
2	HJK	3,545
3	JJK	2,922
4	KuPS	2,628
5	Lahti	2,406
6	Honka	2,265
7	VPS	2,133
8	Oulu	1,992
9	Jaro	1,904
10	Inter Turku	1,853
11	Tampere	1,776
12	Haka	1,449
13	Mariehamn	1,445
14	MyPa	1,172
