= Miikka Ilo =

Finnish footballer (born 1982)

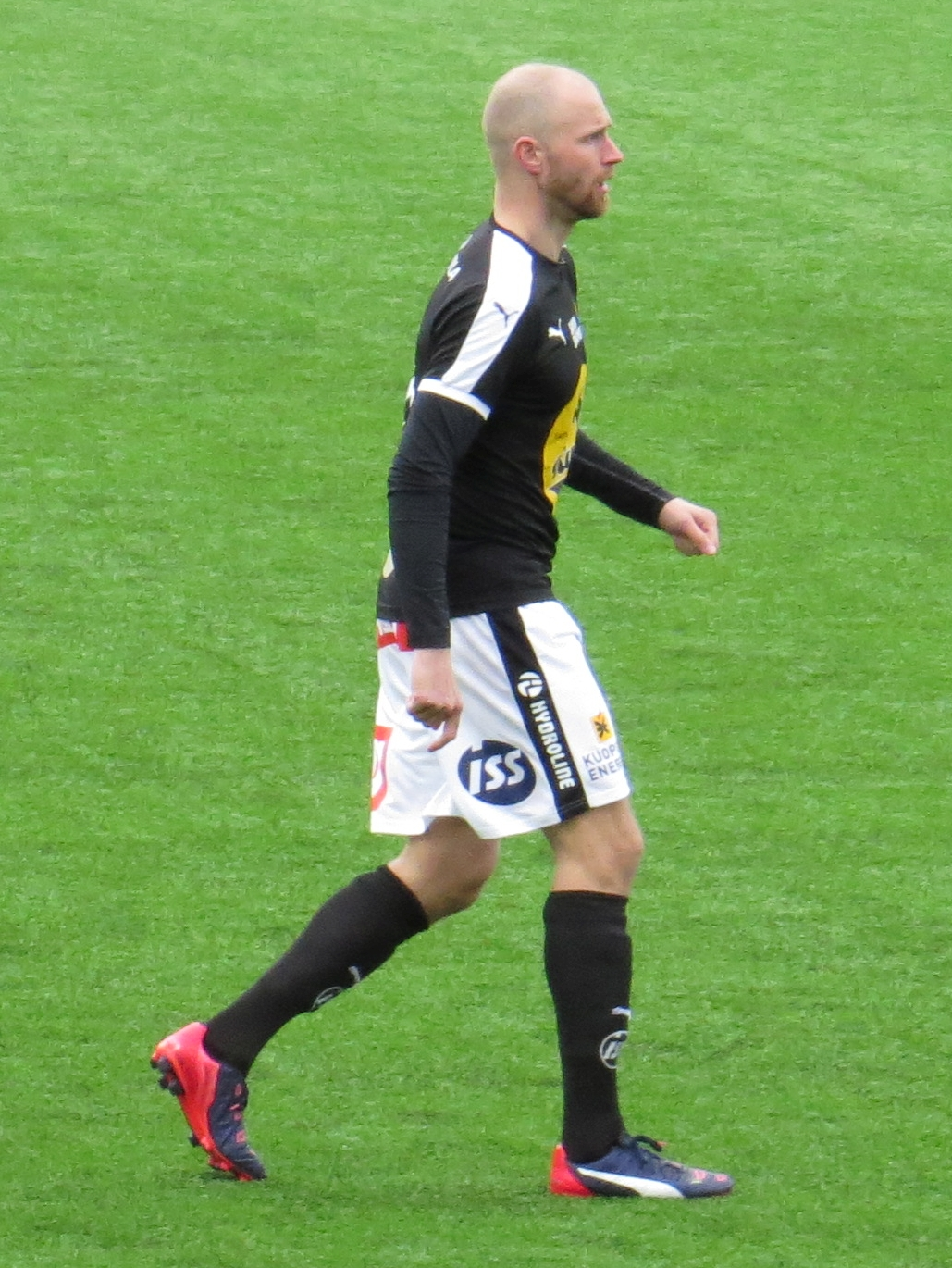
- Ilo with KuPS in 2015

Personal information
- Full name: Miikka Ilo
- Date of birth: 9 May 1982 (age 44)
- Place of birth: Turku, Finland
- Height: 1.88 m (6 ft 2 in)
- Position: Striker

Senior career*
Years	Team	Apps	(Gls)
2000	Pargas IF	11	(4)
2001	SalPa	21	(2)
2001–2002	Telstar	7	(0)
2003–2005	Cambuur	14	(1)
2005–2007	Inter Turku	60	(9)
2008–2015	KuPS	212	(32)
- * Club domestic league appearances and goals as of 6 October 2010

Miikka Ilo (born 9 May 1982) is a Finnish former football player who last played for KuPS.

After his retirement as a player after the 2015 season, Ilo worked for KuPS office as a sales manager. He is currently working in a construction field.

== Career statistics ==
As of 1 September 2024.

Appearances and goals by club, season and competition
Club	Season	League			Cup (Note: Includes Suomen Cup and KNVB Beker)		League cup (Note: Includes Finnish League Cup)		Europe		Total	
Club	Season	Division	Apps	Goals	Apps	Goals	Apps	Goals	Apps	Goals	Apps	Goals
Pargas IF	2000	Kakkonen	11	4	–		–		–		11	4
SalPa	2001	Ykkönen	21	2	–		–		–		21	2
Telstar	2001–02	Eerste Divisie	1	0	0	0	–		–		1	0
Telstar	2002–03	Eerste Divisie	6	0	2	0	–		–		8	0
Telstar	Total		7	0	2	0	0	0	0	0	9	0
Cambuur	2003–04	Eerste Divisie	9	1	–		–		–		14	1
Cambuur	2004–05	Eerste Divisie	5	0	–		–		–		5	0
Cambuur	Total		14	1	0	0	0	0	0	0	14	1
Inter Turku	2005	Veikkausliiga	24	7	–		–		4 (Note: Appearances in UEFA Intertoto Cup)	2	28	9
Inter Turku	2006	Veikkausliiga	23	2	1	1	–		–		24	3
Inter Turku	2007	Veikkausliiga	13	0	–		–		–		13	0
Inter Turku	Total		60	9	1	1	0	0	4	2	65	12
KuPS	2008	Veikkausliiga	25	2	–		–		–		25	2
KuPS	2009	Veikkausliiga	25	3	2	0	6	0	–		33	3
KuPS	2010	Veikkausliiga	24	7	2	0	–		–		26	7
KuPS	2011	Veikkausliiga	30	3	3	1	–		2 (Note: Appearances in UEFA Europa League)	0	35	4
KuPS	2012	Veikkausliiga	26	4	5	1	7	2	6	0	44	7
KuPS	2013	Veikkausliiga	27	3	3	1	7	1	–		37	5
KuPS	2014	Veikkausliiga	29	7	3	2	4	2	–		36	11
KuPS	2015	Veikkausliiga	26	3	3	0	2	0	–		31	3
KuPS	Total		212	32	21	5	26	5	8	0	267	42
Career total			325	48	24	6	26	5	12	2	387	61

== Honours ==
Individual

- Veikkausliiga Player of the Month: May 2010
- Veikkausliiga Midfielder of the Year: 2010,
