= Sampsa Timoska =

Finnish footballer (born 1979)

Personal information
- Date of birth: 12 February 1979 (age 47)
- Place of birth: Kokemäki, Finland
- Height: 1.85 m (6 ft 1 in)
- Position: Defender

Youth career
- 1987–1990: Teljän Nousu
- 1991: Nakkilan Nasta
- 1992: Teljän Nousu
- 1993–1995: Musan Salama

Senior career*
Years	Team	Apps	(Gls)
1996–1998	TPV	6	(0)
1998–2007	MYPA	153	(6)
2007–2008	QPR	21	(0)
2008–2011	MYPA	77	(0)
2012–2016	Ekenäs IF	102	(6)
Total		377	(12)

International career^{‡}
2005	Finland	2	(0)
- * Club domestic league appearances and goals as of 21 April 2024 ‡ National team caps and goals as of 17 December 2009

Sampsa Timoska (born 12 February 1979) is a retired Finnish footballer who played as a defender.

His professional career began in Finland in 1996 at Tampere. Timoska moved to MyPa in 1998 making over 150 appearances before playing for English side Queen's Park Rangers between January 2007 and February 2008 where, after 21 appearances, he was released from his contract by mutual consent.

== Personal life ==
His older brother Jan is also a former professional footballer.

== Career statistics ==
Appearances and goals by club, season and competition
Club	Season	League			Cup (Note: Includes Suomen Cup)		League cup (Note: Includes Finnish League Cup)		Europe		Total	
Club	Season	Division	Apps	Goals	Apps	Goals	Apps	Goals	Apps	Goals	Apps	Goals
TPV	1996	Ykkönen	3	0	–		–		–		3	0
TPV	1997	Ykkönen	3	0	–		–		–		3	0
TPV	Total		6	0	0	0	0	0	0	0	6	0
Euran Pallo (loan)	1997	Kakkonen	7	0	–		–		–		7	0
MYPA	1998	Veikkausliiga	1	0	–		–		–		1	0
MYPA	1999	Veikkausliiga	14	0	–		–		–		14	0
MYPA	2000	Veikkausliiga	16	0	–		–		–		16	0
MYPA	2001	Veikkausliiga	19	0	–		–		1 (Note: Appearance(s) in UEFA Cup)	0	20	0
MYPA	2002	Veikkausliiga	26	1	–		–		2	0	28	1
MYPA	2003	Veikkausliiga	18	1	–		–		1	0	19	1
MYPA	2004	Veikkausliiga	23	2	1	0	–		2	0	26	2
MYPA	2005	Veikkausliiga	17	2	–		–		2	0	19	2
MYPA	2006	Veikkausliiga	20	0	–		–		4 (Note: Appearances in UEFA Champions League)	0	24	0
MYPA	Total		154	6	1	0	0	0	12	0	167	6
AC Vantaa (loan)	2000	Kakkonen	1	0	–		–		–		1	0
Kuusankoski (loan)	2001	Ykkönen	1	0	–		–		–		1	0
Rakuunat (loan)	2004	Ykkönen	1	0	–		–		–		1	0
QPR	2006–07	Championship	14	0	0	0	0	0	–		14	0
QPR	2007–08	Championship	7	0	0	0	0	0	–		7	0
QPR	Total		21	0	0	0	0	0	0	0	21	0
MYPA	2008	Veikkausliiga	24	0	–		–		–		24	0
MYPA	2009	Veikkausliiga	9	0	0	0	5	0	–		14	0
MYPA	2010	Veikkausliiga	19	0	0	0	1	0	5 (Note: Appearances in UEFA Europa League)	0	25	0
MYPA	2011	Veikkausliiga	25	0	0	0	2	0	–		27	0
MYPA	Total		77	0	0	0	8	0	5	0	90	0
Ekenäs IF	2012	Kakkonen	24	2	3	0	–		–		27	2
Ekenäs IF	2013	Kakkonen	21	2	2	0	–		–		23	2
Ekenäs IF	2014	Kakkonen	23	2	0	0	–		–		23	2
Ekenäs IF	2015	Ykkönen	19	0	2	0	–		–		21	0
Ekenäs IF	2016	Ykkönen	19	0	0	0	–		–		19	0
Ekenäs IF	Total		106	6	7	0	0	0	0	0	113	6
Kokemäen Pallo	2017	Nelonen	11	1	–		–		–		11	1
Career total			385	13	8	0	8	0	17	0	418	13

== Honours ==
Individual

- Veikkausliiga Player of the Month: August 2011,
