= Uzuner =

Uzuner is a surname. Notable people with the surname include:

- Buket Uzuner (born 1955), Turkish writer and author
- Muhammet Uzuner (born 1965), Turkish actor
- Şükrü Uzuner (born 1969), Turkish former footballer
