= Juha Pasoja =

Finnish footballer and coach (born 1976)

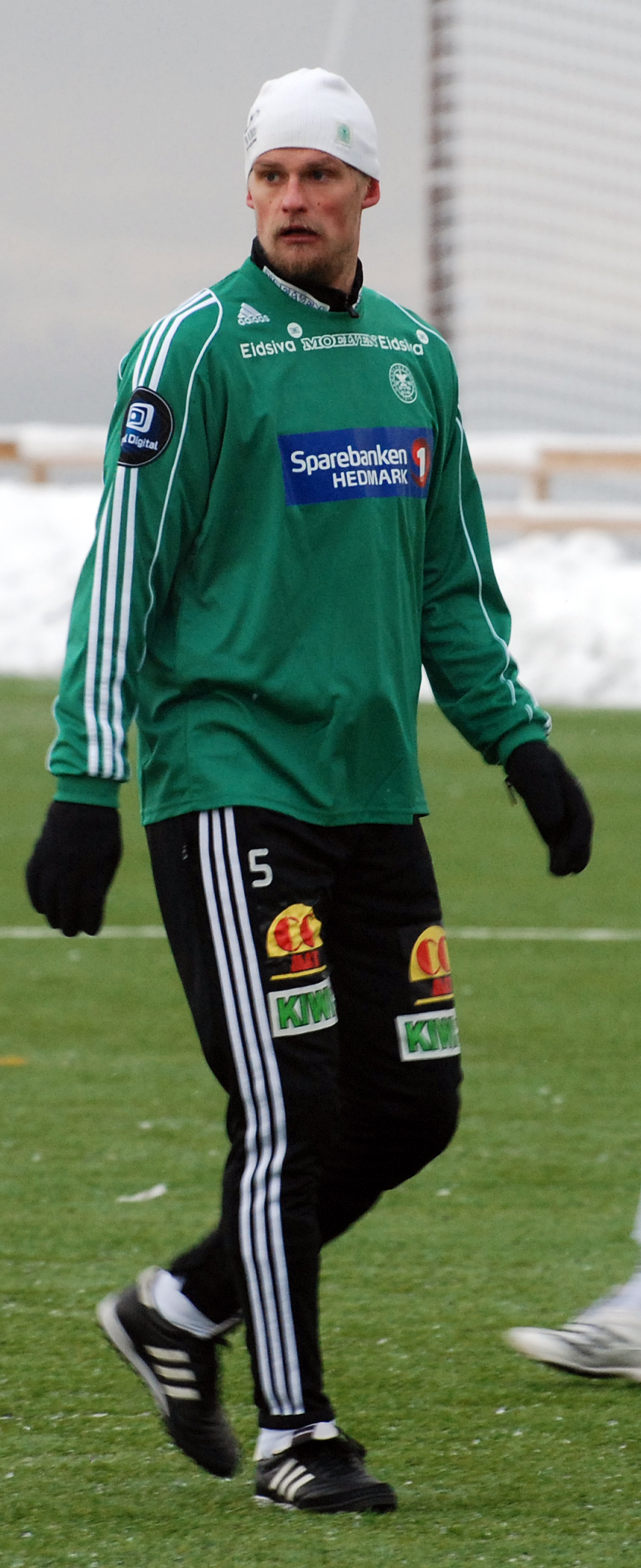
- Pasoja with HamKam in 2009

Personal information
- Full name: Juha Pasoja
- Date of birth: 16 November 1976 (age 49)
- Place of birth: Kemi, Finland
- Height: 1.85 m (6 ft 1 in)
- Position: Defender

Senior career*
Years	Team	Apps	(Gls)
1992–1999	KPT-85	152	(19)
2000–2001	Jazz	59	(9)
2002–2005	Haka	92	(10)
2006–2009	HamKam	84	(19)
2010–2012	JJK	73	(3)
Total		460	(70)

International career
2003–2008	Finland	15	(0)

Managerial career
- 2013–2018: JJK
- 2018–2019: Dreams
- 2019–2020: Kemi City
- 2020–2024: MP
- * Club domestic league appearances and goals

Juha Pasoja (born 16 November 1976) is a Finnish football coach and former defender. From 2020 to 2024, he was the head coach of Mikkelin Palloilijat (MP) in second-tier Ykkösliiga. Before that, he was the head coach of Dreams FC in Ghana Premier League. Currently Pasoja works for EIF youth sector.

== Playing career ==
During his playing career, Pasoja played for FC Haka, FC Jazz, JJK in the Veikkausliiga and has 224 matches and 22 goals. In addition he played for HamKam in Norway and has been capped 15 times for Finland.

He has also played futsal and represented Finland national futsal team.

== Coaching career ==
Pasoja started his coaching career in JJK Jyväskylä after his playing career. After five years in Jyväskylä, Pasoja was named the head coach of Ghana Premier League club Dreams FC in 2018.

In 2019, he returned to his hometown in Finland and was named the head coach of Kemi City.

In 2020, Pasoja was appointed as the head coach of Mikkelin Palloilijat. In August 2023, the club exercised their option and his contract was extended on a one-year deal.

In November 2024, Pasoja joined Ekenäs IF (EIF) youth sector to develop the club's coaching.

== Career statistics ==
As of 26 August 2024.

Appearances and goals by club, season and competition
Club	Season	League			Cup (Note: Includes Suomen Cup)		League cup (Note: Includes Finnish League Cup)		Europe		Total	
Club	Season	Division	Apps	Goals	Apps	Goals	Apps	Goals	Apps	Goals	Apps	Goals
KPT-85	1992	Kakkonen										
KPT-85	1993	Kakkonen										
KPT-85	1994	Kakkonen										
KPT-85	1995	Kakkonen										
KPT-85	1996	Kakkonen										
KPT-85	1997	Ykkönen	22	5							22	5
KPT-85	1998	Ykkönen	23	2							23	2
KPT-85	1999	Ykkönen	25	7							25	7
KPT-85	Total		152	19	0	0	0	0	0	0	152	19
Jazz	2000	Veikkausliiga	29	4	–		–		–		29	4
Jazz	2001	Veikkausliiga	30	5	0	0	–		4 (Note: Appearances in UEFA Intertoto Cup)	0	34	5
Jazz	Total		59	9	0	0	0	0	4	0	63	9
Haka	2002	Veikkausliiga	26	1	1	1	–		4	0	31	2
Haka	2003	Veikkausliiga	25	5	–		–		2 (Note: Appearances in UEFA Cup)	0	27	5
Haka	2004	Veikkausliiga	16	3	–		–		3	0	19	3
Haka	2005	Veikkausliiga	25	1	1	0	–		4 (Note: Appearances in UEFA Champions League)	1	30	2
Haka	Total		92	10	2	1	0	0	13	1	107	12
HamKam	2006	Tippeligaen	23	4	–		–		–		23	4
HamKam	2007	1. divisjon	25	9	–		–		–		25	9
HamKam	2008	Tippeligaen	17	2	–		–		–		17	2
HamKam	2009	1. divisjon	19	4	–		–		–		19	4
HamKam	Total		84	19	0	0	0	0	0	0	84	19
JJK Jyväskylä	2010	Veikkausliiga	26	1	0	0	1	0	–		27	1
JJK Jyväskylä	2011	Veikkausliiga	29	1	1	0	0	0	–		30	1
JJK Jyväskylä	2012	Veikkausliiga	20	1	2	0	5	0	4 (Note: Appearances in UEFA Europa League)	0	31	1
JJK Jyväskylä	Total		75	3	3	0	6	0	4	0	88	3
Career total			362	60	5	1	6	0	21	1	394	62

== Honours ==
As a player
Haka

- Veikkausliiga: 2004
- Finnish Cup: 2002, 2005
