= Martti J. Kari =

Finnish intelligence officer and university teacher

- Born: 17 November 1960; Tampere, Finland
- Died: 30 August 2023 (aged 62); Jyväskylä, Finland
- Education: National Defence University; University of Jyväskylä
- Military career
- Allegiance: Finland
- Branch: Finnish Army
- Rank: Colonel (retd)
- Known for: Military intelligence; Russia analysis

Martti Johannes Kari (17 November 1960 – 30 August 2023) was a Finnish cyber security and hybrid warfare expert and retired military intelligence officer. He came to wider public attention, especially as a result of the Russian invasion of Ukraine, as a commentator on Russian military strategy based on his over 30 years of experience monitoring and analysing Russia and the Soviet Union.

Kari began his military career by undergoing his national service in the airborne special forces at the Parachute Jaeger School (now Utti Jaeger Regiment), finishing at the head of his class. He stayed with the military and was commissioned as an officer, first at the Armoured Brigade, later moving to the Signal Regiment.

He served in a number of roles in the Finnish Defence Forces, including as a deputy head of intelligence at the Defence Command, director of the Centre for signals intelligence (Viestikoekeskus), and military attaché at the Finnish Embassies to Warsaw and Kyiv. He also contributed to the structural reforms of the Ukrainian military intelligence activity in 2020 as a strategic advisor. He retired from active service in 2017 at the rank of colonel.

Later, Kari had an academic career at the University of Jyväskylä, where he lectured on strategic and security subjects, and where, in 2022, he was appointed professor of practice in security and strategic analysis at the faculty of information technology.

His December 2018 lecture titled Venäläinen strateginen kulttuuri – miksi Venäjä toimii niin kuin se toimii (lit. 'Russian strategic culture – why Russia acts the way it does') was published online and had 1.8 million views on YouTube as of December 2023, making it the most-viewed Finnish university lecture of all time.

Kari held a degree in Arabic language and Islamic studies, a master's degree in Russian language, and a PhD in cyber security; he had additionally studied international law. He spoke fluent Russian, English, Swedish, and French, as well as some Arabic and Polish.

He was diagnosed with terminal cancer and died in August 2023. He is survived by his second wife, Revd. Niina Kari, and the couple's daughter. He also had four other children from his earlier marriage, one of whom is the footballer Tommi Kari.
