= Sixten Boström =

Finnish footballer and coach (born 1963)

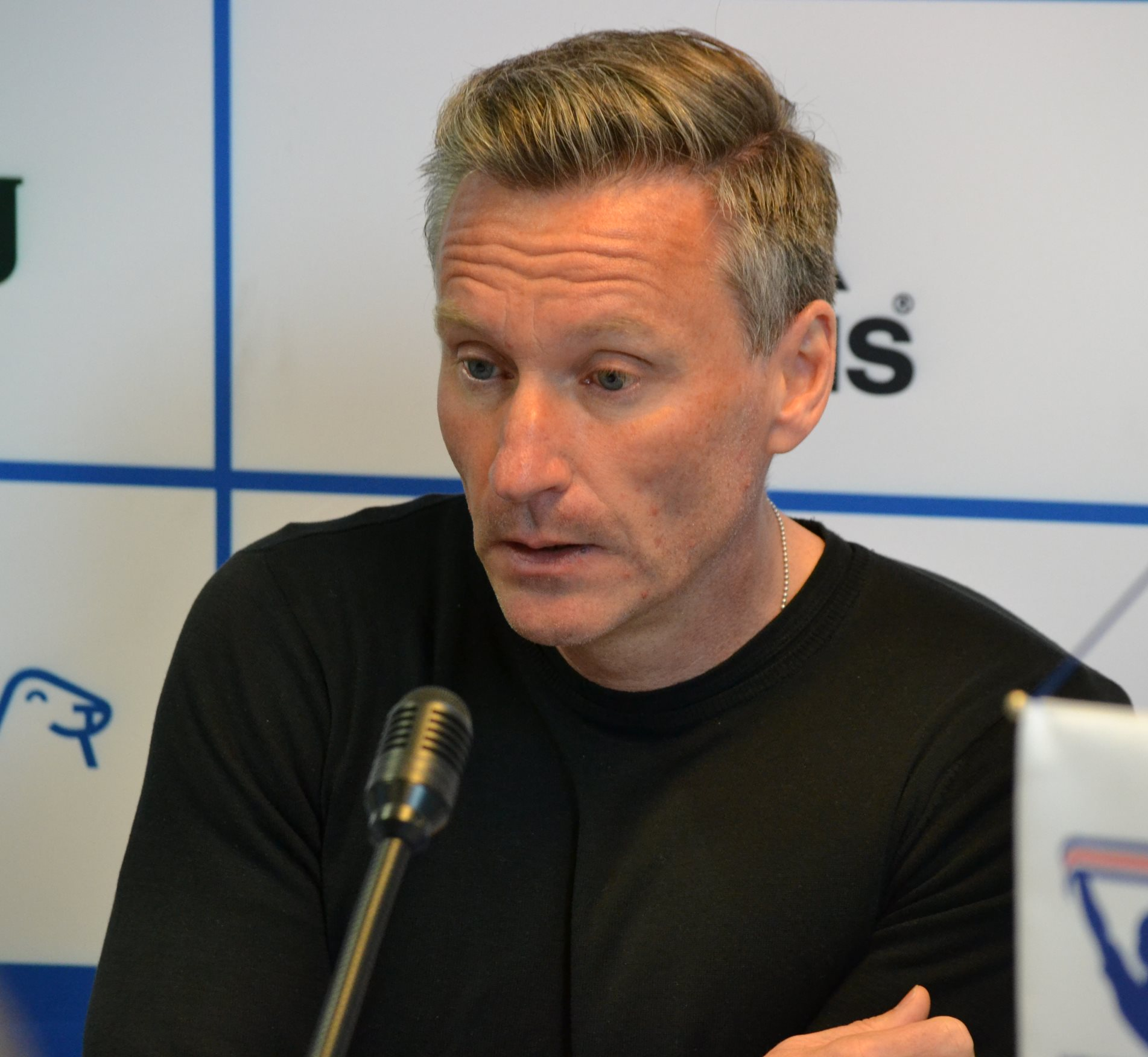
- Boström in 2017

Personal information
- Full name: Sixten Boström
- Date of birth: 15 September 1963 (age 63)
- Place of birth: Helsinki, Finland
- Height: 1.77 m (5 ft 9 1/2 in)
- Position: Midfielder

Team information
- Current team: KuPS (sporting director)

Youth career
- HJK

Senior career*
Years	Team	Apps	(Gls)
1981–1983	HJK	59	(16)
1984–1985	Häcken	41	(10)
1986–1987	HJK	28	(6)
1988	Geylang International	?	(?)
1988–1991	Kuusysi	90	(18)
1989	→ Jurong Town (loan)	?	(?)
1990	→ Geylang International (loan)	?	(?)
1991–1993	FinnPa	21	(6)
1993	TiPS	?	(?)
1994	Helsinki United	?	(?)
Total		239	(56)

International career
1982–1985	Finland U21	11	(1)
1983–1987	Finland	14	(2)

Managerial career
- 1995–1996: EIF
- Jokerit II (assistant)
- 2002–2004: Jaro
- 2008–2012: Örebro
- 2013–2014: HJK
- 2015–2017: Columbus Crew (assistant)
- 2017: SJK
- 2019–2023: PK-35 (academy director)
- 2023–2024: KuPS (assistant)
- 2024–: KuPS (sporting director)
- * Club domestic league appearances and goals

Sixten Boström (born 15 September 1963) is a Finnish football coach and former midfielder, who is currently serving as the sporting director for Veikkausliiga club Kuopion Palloseura (KuPS).

== Playing career ==
Boström was born in Helsinki to a Swedish-speaking family. During his playing career, Boström played as a midfielder for HJK Helsinki, Kuusysi and FinnPa in Finland, for Häcken in Sweden, and for Geylang International and Jurong Town in Singapore. He earned 14 caps for Finland, scoring 2 goals.

== Coaching career ==
Boström started as a youth coach for VJS, HJK Helsinki, and FinnPa.

As a head coach, Boström was in charge of Ekenäs IF (EIF), Jaro in Finland, and Örebro in Swedish Allsvenskan, before he was named the manager of HJK in 2013, leading the club to win the championship title in his first season. A poor start to the following season led to his firing on 29 April 2014.

During 2015–2017, he worked as an assistant coach under Gregg Berhalter for Columbus Crew of Major League Soccer (MLS).

He was announced at head coach of Finnish club SJK on 20 February 2017, and the club announced his departure on 2 June 2017.

During 2019–2023, Boström worked as an academy director of PK-35.

In May 2023, he was named an assistant coach of Kuopion Palloseura (KuPS) in Veikkausliiga, joining the coaching staff of Jani Honkavaara. After Honkavaara had announced his departure after the 2024 season, on 15 August the club announced that Boström will continue as the club's new sporting director from the start of 2025, while working also as an assistant coach of the upcoming manager Jarkko Wiss. At the end of the 2024 season, Honkavaara and Boström led KuPS to win the Finnish Championship and Finnish Cup titles, completing the club's first-ever double.

== Coaching record ==
As of 9 July 2023

Team	Nat	From	To	Record							
Team	Nat	From	To	G	W	D	L	GF	GA	GD	Win %
Jaro	(Finland)	1 January 2002	16 July 2004	81	29	15	37	117	129	−12	35.80
Örebro	(Sweden)	30 November 2007	8 June 2012	146	57	31	58	175	183	−8	39.04
HJK Helsinki	(Finland)	1 January 2013	29 April 2014	56	33	12	11	116	46	+70	58.93
SJK Seinäjoki	(Finland)	20 February 2017	2 June 2017	11	3	4	4	15	19	−4	27.27
Total				283	119	58	106	408	358	+50	42.05

== Honours ==
=== As a player ===
HJK

- Mestaruussarja: 1981, 1987
- Finnish Cup: 1981

Kuusysi

- Mestaruussarja: 1989
- Veikkausliiga: 1991

Geylang International

- FAS Premier League: 1988, 1990

Jurong Town

- President's Cup: 1989

== Coaching honours ==
=== As head coach ===
HJK

- Veikkausliiga: 2013

Individual

- Veikkausliiga Coach of the Month: September 2013

=== As assistant coach ===
Columbus Crew

- MLS Cup: 2015

KuPS

- Veikkausliiga: 2024
- Veikkausliiga runner-up: 2023
- Finnish Cup: 2024
- Finnish League Cup runner-up: 2024
