= Tomi Maanoja =

Finnish footballer (born 1986)

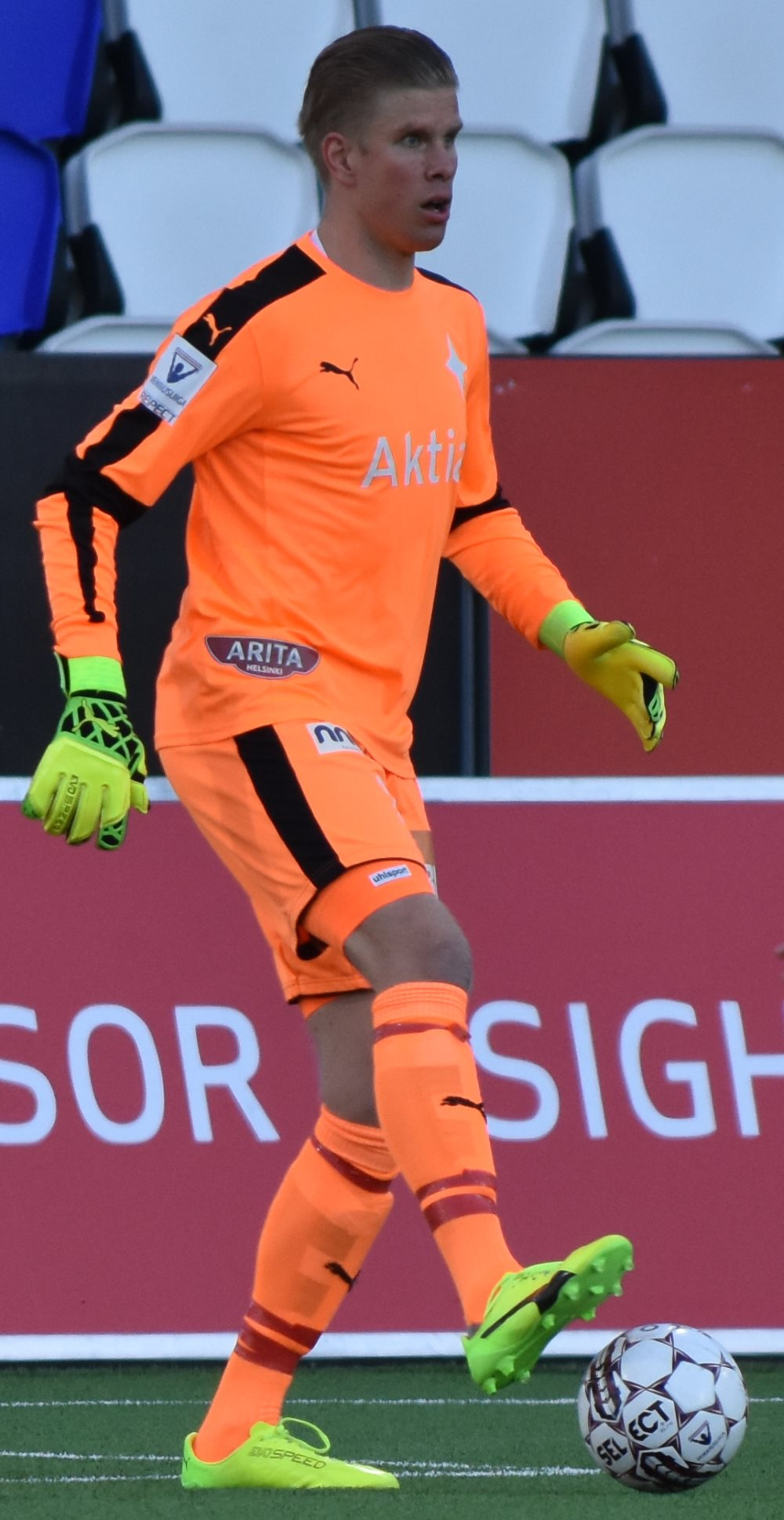
- Maanoja with HIFK in 2017

Personal information
- Full name: Tomi Antero Maanoja
- Date of birth: 12 September 1986 (age 40)
- Place of birth: Espoo, Finland
- Height: 1.96 m (6 ft 5 in)
- Position: Goalkeeper

Team information
- Current team: HIFK (assistant)

Youth career
- VJS

Senior career*
Years	Team	Apps	(Gls)
2005	Allianssi	2	(0)
2006–2008	Honka	37	(0)
2008–2011	AIK	26	(0)
2011	Honka	23	(0)
2012	Sandefjord	1	(0)
2013	RoPS	25	(0)
2014–2015	KuPS	64	(0)
2016–2017	Lahti	12	(0)
2016–2017	→ HIFK (loan)	13	(0)
2017–2018	HIFK	30	(0)
2020	IF Gnistan	13	(0)
2021	VJS	13	(0)
2022	PK-35	1	(0)

International career
- Finland U21
2009	Finland	2	(0)

Managerial career
- 2022: PK-35 (gk coach)
- 2023: HIFK (gk coach)
- 2024: KäPa (assistant)
- 2025–: HIFK (assistant)
- * Club domestic league appearances and goals

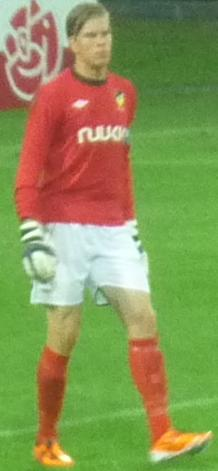
Maanoja with Honka in 2011

Tomi Antero Maanoja (born 12 September 1986) is a Finnish football coach and a former professional goalkeeper, currently serving as assistant coach of HIFK. Maanoja has been capped twice for Finland.

== Career ==
Maanoja made his first appearance in the Veikkausliiga with AC Allianssi from Vantaa in 2005. He completed a move to the neighbouring city's (Espoo) most notable football club, FC Honka, the following season. Maanoja was regarded as one of the best Finnish young goalkeepers and attracted interest from several foreign clubs before his move to AIK on 29 July 2008. He signed a three-and-a-half-year deal with the club for a fee of €450,000.

On 28 February 2009, Maanoja became seriously injured in a pre-season game against Assyriska Föreningen. He broke his leg in two places, rushing out to stop an Assyriska attack. The injury made him miss the 2009 UEFA European Under-21 Football Championship, hosted in Sweden, in the summer. He also missed the whole 2009 Allsvenskan season, when AIK won the double. He moved back to Honka in 2011, and on 21 February 2012 he signed a contract with the Norwegian First Division club Sandefjord Fotball as a free agent. Sandefjord's head coach Arne Sandstø let Maanoja play the match against Alta in May 2012 instead of Iven Austbø, but Maanoja spent the rest of the season as the reserve goalkeeper. After one season in Norway, he moved back to Finland and signed for RoPS.

During the season spent with Rovaniemen Palloseura (RoPS), he was selected the Veikkausliiga Player of the Month in July 2013 after showing impressive form and going through the whole month without conceding a goal.

In 2014, He moved to Kuopion Palloseura (KuPS), signing a two-year contract. During the 2014 season Maanoja made a new club record by keeping 13 clean sheets in the league while featuring in all of the competitive matches playing every minute during that season.

In 2020, he joined IF Gnistan.

== Coaching career ==
Maanoja has worked as a goalkeeping coach of PK-35 and HIFK. Since February 2024, he was the assistant coach of KäPa in Ykkösliiga until the end of July. In January 2025, he was named an assistant coach of HIFK, focusing on the set-pieces.

== Career statistics ==
=== Club ===
As of 1 September 2024.

Appearances and goals by club, season and competition
Club	Season	League			Cup (Note: Includes Suomen Cup, Svenska Cupen and Norwegian Cup)		League cup (Note: Includes Finnish League Cup)		Europe		Total	
Club	Season	Division	Apps	Goals	Apps	Goals	Apps	Goals	Apps	Goals	Apps	Goals
AC Allianssi	2005	Veikkausliiga	2	0	0	0	–		0	0	2	0
Honka	2006	Veikkausliiga	3	0	0	0	–		–		3	0
Honka	2007	Veikkausliiga	14	0	1	0	–		–		15	0
Honka	2008	Veikkausliiga	14	0	0	0	–		2 (Note: Appearances in UEFA Cup)	0	16	0
Honka	Total		31	0	1	0	0	0	2	0	34	0
AIK	2008	Allsvenskan	12	0	0	0	–		–		12	0
AIK	2009	Allsvenskan	0	0	1	0	–		–		1	0
AIK	2010	Allsvenskan	14	0	1	0	–		–		15	0
AIK	Total		26	0	2	0	0	0	0	0	28	0
Honka	2011	Veikkausliiga	24	0	0	0	2	0	4 (Note: Appearances in UEFA Europa League)	0	30	0
Sandefjord	2012	1. divisjon	1	0	2	0	–		–		3	0
Sandefjord 2	2012	3. divisjon	12	0	–		–		–		12	0
RoPS	2013	Veikkausliiga	25	0	2	0	3	0	–		30	0
KuPS	2014	Veikkausliiga	33	0	3	0	5	0	–		41	0
KuPS	2015	Veikkausliiga	31	0	5	0	3	0	–		39	0
KuPS	Total		64	0	8	0	8	0	0	0	80	0
Lahti	2016	Veikkausliiga	12	0	4	0	4	0	–		20	0
HIFK (loan)	2016	Veikkausliiga	13	0	–		–		–		13	0
HIFK	2017	Veikkausliiga	17	0	1	0	–		–		18	0
HIFK	2018	Ykkönen	13	0	–		–		–		13	0
HIFK	Total		30	0	1	0	0	0	0	0	31	0
HIFK II	2018	Kakkonen	1	0	–		–		–		1	0
Gnistan	2020	Ykkönen	13	0	2	0	–		–		15	0
VJS	2021	Kakkonen	13	0	–		–		–		13	0
PK-35	2022	Ykkönen	1	0	–		–		–		1	0
Career total			268	0	22	0	17	0	6	0	313	0

=== International ===
As of match played 4 February 2009

Finland
Year	Apps	Goals
2009	1	0
Total	1	0

== Honours ==
AC Allianssi

- Finnish League Cup: 2004, 2005

AIK

- Allsvenskan: 2009
- Svenska Cupen: 2009
- Supercupen: 2010

Honka

- Finnish League Cup: 2011

RoPS

- Finnish Cup: 2013

Individual

- Veikkausliiga Player of the Month: July 2013
