= Jukka Sinisalo =

Finnish footballer (born 1982)

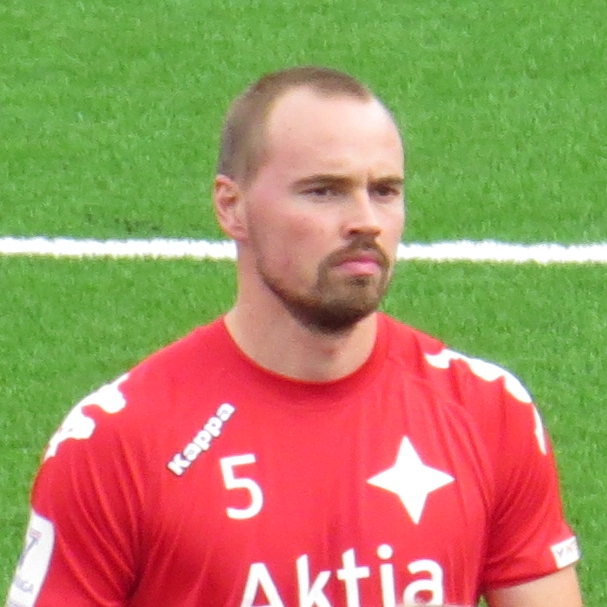
- Jukka Sinisalo in 2015.

Personal information
- Date of birth: 21 May 1982 (age 44)
- Place of birth: Jyväskylä, Finland
- Height: 1.81 m (5 ft 11 1/2 in)
- Position: Defender

Team information
- Current team: HIFK
- Number: 5

Youth career
- 1989–1994: JPS
- 1995–1999: JJK

Senior career*
Years	Team	Apps	(Gls)
2000–2002	JJK	55	(6)
2002–2003	FC Inter	2	(0)
2002–2003	→ VG-62 (loan)	19	(0)
2004	VG-62	25	(0)
2005–2006	FC Inter	36	(0)
2005–2006	→ VG-62 (loan)	7	(0)
2007–2010	JJK	85	(4)
2010	→ FC Blackbird (loan)	1	(0)
2011–2013	FC Lahti	75	(3)
2014–	HIFK	37	(2)
- * Club domestic league appearances and goals as of 25 August 2015

Jukka Sinisalo (born 21 May 1982) is a Finnish football player who signed for Veikkausliiga side HIFK in early 2014. His position is central defender. Sinisalo began his career as a junior footballer in JPS and later in JJK. From JJK he transferred to VG-62 before moving to FC Inter of Turku. During his spell in Inter, he also made his debut in Veikkausliiga, the Finnish top level.

In early 2014, he signed a contract with HIFK that played in the second tier of Finnish football, Ykkönen, at the time being. Ever since then, Sinisalo has represented HIFK and was one of the key players during their successful season of 2014, after which HIFK got promoted back to the top flight, Veikkausliiga.

== Playing style ==
Sinisalo is being described as being a defender upon whom the team can trust. His experience brings value to the team and his style to lead with example improves performances of his teammates.

== Personal life ==
Sinisalo studies welfare technology and is a father.
