= Mikko Manninen =

Finnish footballer (born 1985)

Personal information
- Date of birth: 25 May 1985 (age 41)
- Place of birth: Korpilahti, Finland
- Height: 1.71 m (5 ft 7 in)
- Position: Winger

Team information
- Current team: JJK
- Number: 5

Youth career
- –2003: JJK Jyväskylä
- 2004: Haka Valkeakoski

Senior career*
Years	Team	Apps	(Gls)
2005–2008	Haka	109	(9)
2009–2010	TPS	63	(7)
2011–	JJK	270	(40)

International career
2008	Finland B	1	(0)
- * Club domestic league appearances and goals as of 27 November 2023

Mikko Manninen (born 25 May 1985) is a Finnish footballer who plays as a midfielder for Ykkönen club JJK.

Manninen played well in pre-season for TPS but since the Veikkausliiga started, he's been struggling to find his old form, although he has been able to hold on his starting place for now. On 17 November JJK announced that Manninen would "return home" for the 2011 season as he signed a three-year contract with his old club.

== Honours ==
=== Individual ===
- Veikkausliiga player of the month: July 2008
- Top Assist Player Veikkausliiga 2006 with 9 Assists.
- Top Assist Player Veikkausliiga 2008 with 11 Assists.
