= Anssi Viren =

Finnish footballer (born 1977)

Personal information
- Date of birth: 10 April 1977 (age 49)
- Place of birth: Lahti, Finland
- Height: 1.79 m (5 ft 10 1/2 in)
- Position: Defender

Senior career*
Years	Team	Apps	(Gls)
1995	Kuusysi	10	(0)
1998	PK-35	26	(0)
1999	Jokerit	14	(0)
2000–2001	Lahti		
2002	Hämeenlinna	18	(0)
2003	Jokerit	26	(0)
2004–2007	KooTeePee	93	(1)
2008–2011	JJK Jyväskylä	60	(2)
2013	JJK Jyväskylä	21	(0)
2015–2018	Vaajakoski	44	(0)

Managerial career
- 2018–2019: Vaajakoski (assistant)
- * Club domestic league appearances and goals

Anssi Viren (born 10 April 1977) is a Finnish football coach and a former player.
