= Touko Tumanto =

Finnish footballer (born 1982)

Personal information
- Date of birth: 6 March 1982 (age 44)
- Place of birth: Helsinki, Finland
- Height: 1.81 m (5 ft 11 1/2 in)
- Position: Midfielder

Senior career*
Years	Team	Apps	(Gls)
2003–2009	Inter Turku	84	(3)
2010–2011	JJK	24	(0)
2012	SJK	23	(2)
- * Club domestic league appearances and goals as of 2 May 2013

Touko Tumanto (born 6 March 1982) is a Finnish professional football player.

Tumanto has played many places in different teams. He is known for his versatile style of playing. Midfielder is his strongest position.
