= Tamás Gruborovics =

Hungarian footballer

- Gruborovics (left) and Hermanni Vuorinen

Personal information
- Date of birth: 3 July 1984 (age 42)
- Place of birth: Szeged, Hungary
- Height: 1.88 m (6 ft 2 in)
- Position: Midfielder

Team information
- Current team: HJK (mental coach)

Youth career
- MP

Senior career*
Years	Team	Apps	(Gls)
2004	MP	25	(8)
2005–2007	KuPS	67	(12)
2008	FC KooTeePee	24	(2)
2009–2010	IFK Mariehamn	51	(18)
2011–2012	JJK	51	(28)
2013–2014	FC Inter Turku	60	(9)
2015	KTP	29	(5)
2016	EIF	18	(3)

Managerial career
- 2018: BK-46 (assistant)
- 2026–: HJK (mental coach)
- * Club domestic league appearances and goals

Tamás Gruborovics (born 3 July 1984) is a Hungarian football coach and a former player. He is currently mental coach of HJK Helsinki.

He formerly played for MP, KuPS, FC KooTeePee and JJK Jyväskylä. During the 2010 season, he was his team's best goalscorer with 10 goals playing for IFK Mariehamn 2009–2010.

On 17 November 2010 he signed a two-year contract with JJK.

His father, Tibor, played six seasons for MP between 1989-1995 and made 177 appearances for the Mikkeli-based club.

In 2011 it was revealed that Gruborovics does not actually hold a Finnish passport despite being raised there and living there since child. He has since declared his interest in playing for the Hungary national team.

== Honours ==
Individual

- Veikkausliiga Player of the Month: July 2010, May 2012,
