= Babatunde Wusu =

Nigerian-Finnish footballer

Baba Wusu
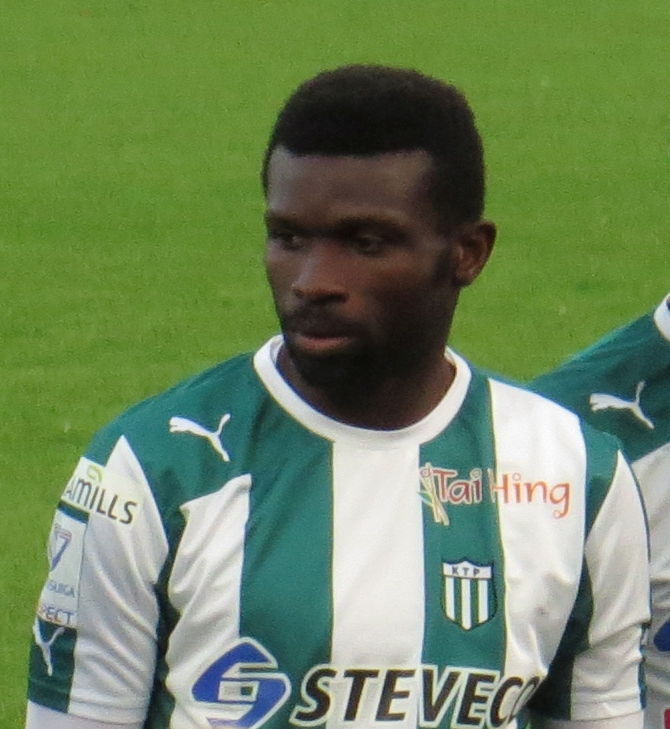
- Babatunde Wusu in 2015.

Personal information
- Full name: Babatunde Enitan Wusu
- Date of birth: April 18, 1984 (age 42)
- Place of birth: Lagos, Nigeria
- Height: 1.81 m (5 ft 11 in)
- Position: Striker

Team information
- Current team: KTP
- Number: 20

Senior career*
Years	Team	Apps	(Gls)
2002	Kanavan Pallohait	22	(21)
2003–2004	TPS	14	(1)
2004	Ljungskile SK	10	(3)
2005–2006	Mikkelin Palloilijat	38	(16)
2007–2008	JJK	45	(35)
2009–2010	TPS	36	(13)
2011–2013	JJK	59	(28)
2013–2014	Al Khaleej Club	6	(4)
2014	FC Vaajakoski	5	(7)
2015	KTP	1	(1)
- * Club domestic league appearances and goals as of 14 September 2015

Babatunde Enitan Wusu (born April 4, 1984 in Lagos, Nigeria) is a former football striker from Nigeria who ended his career in KTP.

He also has a Finnish citizenship. After the playing career, he has coached Jyväskylän Komeetat.

== Career ==
The top scorer 2008 of Ykkönen moved on 1 January 2008 from Jyväskylän Jalkapalloklubi to Turun Palloseura. Babatunde is very strong and straight forward who is known for his goal scoring ability. He rejoined JJK on a three-year contract on 11 November 2010.

== Honours ==
Jyväskylän Jalkapalloklubi

- Ykkönen: 2008

TPS

- Finnish Cup: 2010

=== Individual ===
- Ykkönen top scorer (22 goals): 2008
- Ykkönen Players' Player of the Season: 2008
