= Janne Korhonen (footballer) =

Finnish footballer (born 1979)

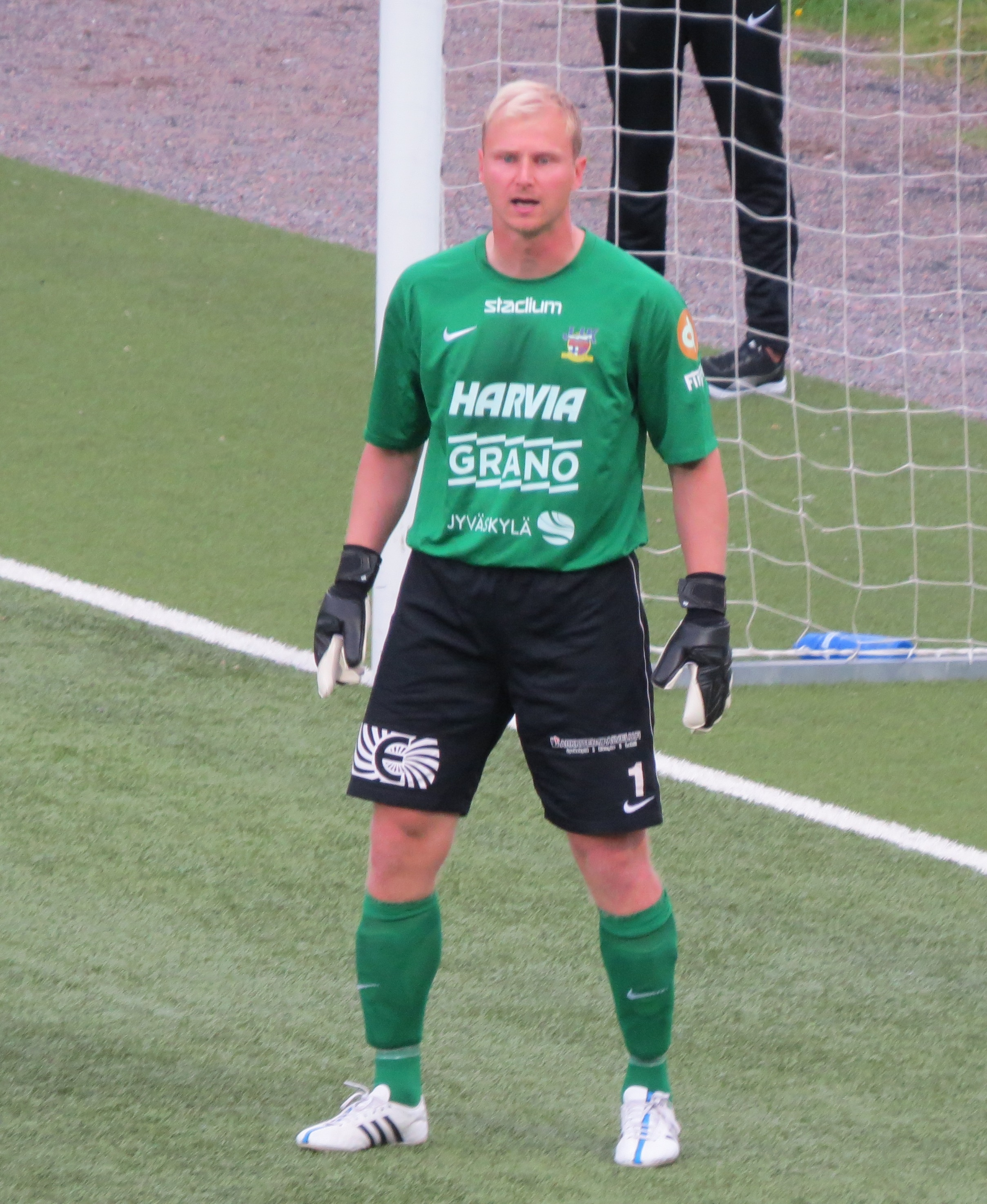

Personal information
- Date of birth: 28 November 1979 (age 46)
- Place of birth: Jyväskylä, Finland
- Height: 1.84 m (6 ft 1/2 in)
- Position: Goalkeeper

Senior career*
| Years | Team | Apps | (Gls) |
| 1999–2008 | MYPA | 141 | (0) |
| 2009–2010 | FC Haka | 38 | (0) |
| 2010–2015 | JJK | 141 | (0) |

Managerial career
- 2015–2018: JJK (GK coach)
- * Club domestic league appearances and goals

Janne Korhonen (born 28 November 1979) is a Finnish professional football coach and a former goalkeeper. During years 1999–2008 he played for first division side MYPA. On 30 April 2010 he was selected as the Player of The Month in Veikkausliiga. (in Finnish)

Due to his good performances in Veikkausliiga, he was the Finland national team choice against Belgium as a third choice goalkeeper by the national team coach Stuart Baxter.

== Honours ==
Individual

- Veikkausliiga Player of the Month: April 2010
