= Jukka-Pekka Tuomanen =

Finnish footballer (born 1985)

Personal information
- Date of birth: 4 December 1985 (age 40)
- Place of birth: Lohja, Finland
- Height: 1.79 m (5 ft 10 1/2 in)
- Position: Midfielder

Senior career*
Years	Team	Apps	(Gls)
2003–2007	TPS	68	(1)
2008	Jaro	26	(1)
2009–2013	JJK	128	(2)
2014–2016	SalPa	47	(2)
2017–2020	KaaPo	28	(0)

International career
	Finland U21	2	(0)
- * Club domestic league appearances and goals

Jukka-Pekka Tuomanen (born 4 December 1985) is a Finnish former football player.
