= Şükrü Uzuner =

Turkish association football player

Personal information
- Date of birth: 2 February 1969 (age 57)
- Place of birth: Istanbul, Turkey
- Position: Forward

Senior career*
Years	Team	Apps	(Gls)
–1993	Kartalspor	0	(0)
1992	→ Darıca Gençlerbirliği (loan)		
1993–1994	Maltepespor		
1994–1995	Huima		
1995–1997	JJK		
1998	FinnPa	24	(9)
1999	HJK	16	(2)
1999	KTP	8	(4)
2000–2001	Atlantis FC	3+	(0+)
2001	FC Hämeenlinna		
2002	JJK		
2005–2006	JJK		
2007–2010	FC Blackbird		
2009	→ BET (loan)		
- * Club domestic league appearances and goals

Şükrü Uzuner (born 2 February 1969) is a Turkish former footballer who is last known to have played as a forward for FC Blackbird.

== Career ==
Uzuner started his career with Turkish second tier side Kartalspor. In 1992, he was sent on loan to Darıca Gençlerbirliği in the Turkish fourth tier. In 1994, Uzuner signed for Finnish fourth tier club Huima. In 1995, he signed for JJK in the Finnish third tier, helping them earn promotion to the Finnish second tier. Before the 1998 season, Uzuner signed for Finnish top flight team FinnPa, where he made 24 league appearances and scored 9 goals. Before the 1999 season, he signed for HJK in the Finnish top flight.

Before the 2000 season, Uzuner signed for Finnish second tier outfit Atlantis FC, helping them earn promotion to the Finnish top flight. Before the 2002 season, he signed for JJK in the Finnish third tier. In 2009, Uzuner was sent on loan to Finnish fourth tier side BET, where he was suspended for a month due to walking off the field after getting a red card before going back to the field and head butting the opponent he fouled.
