= Tommi Kari =

Finnish footballer (born 1986)

Personal information
- Date of birth: 22 September 1986 (age 40)
- Place of birth: Kouvola, Finland
- Height: 1.68 m (5 ft 6 in)
- Position: Midfielder

Team information
- Current team: PPJ
- Number: 22

Youth career
- 1992–1997: Nousu
- 1998–2004: JJK

Senior career*
Years	Team	Apps	(Gls)
2005–2011	JJK	154	(45)
2012–2014	Lahti	32	(5)
2013	→ Lahti Akatemia (loan)	1	(0)
2014–2018	JJK	115	(13)
2019	Jyväskylä Blackbird	6	(1)
2020–	PPJ	17	(7)
- * Club domestic league appearances and goals as of 28 March 2022

Tommi Kari (born 22 September 1986) is a Finnish footballer who plays as a midfielder for Kakkonen club PPJ.

== Personal life ==
His father was a Finnish cyber security and hybrid warfare expert and retired military intelligence officer Martti J. Kari.
