= Job Dragtsma =

Dutch football manager

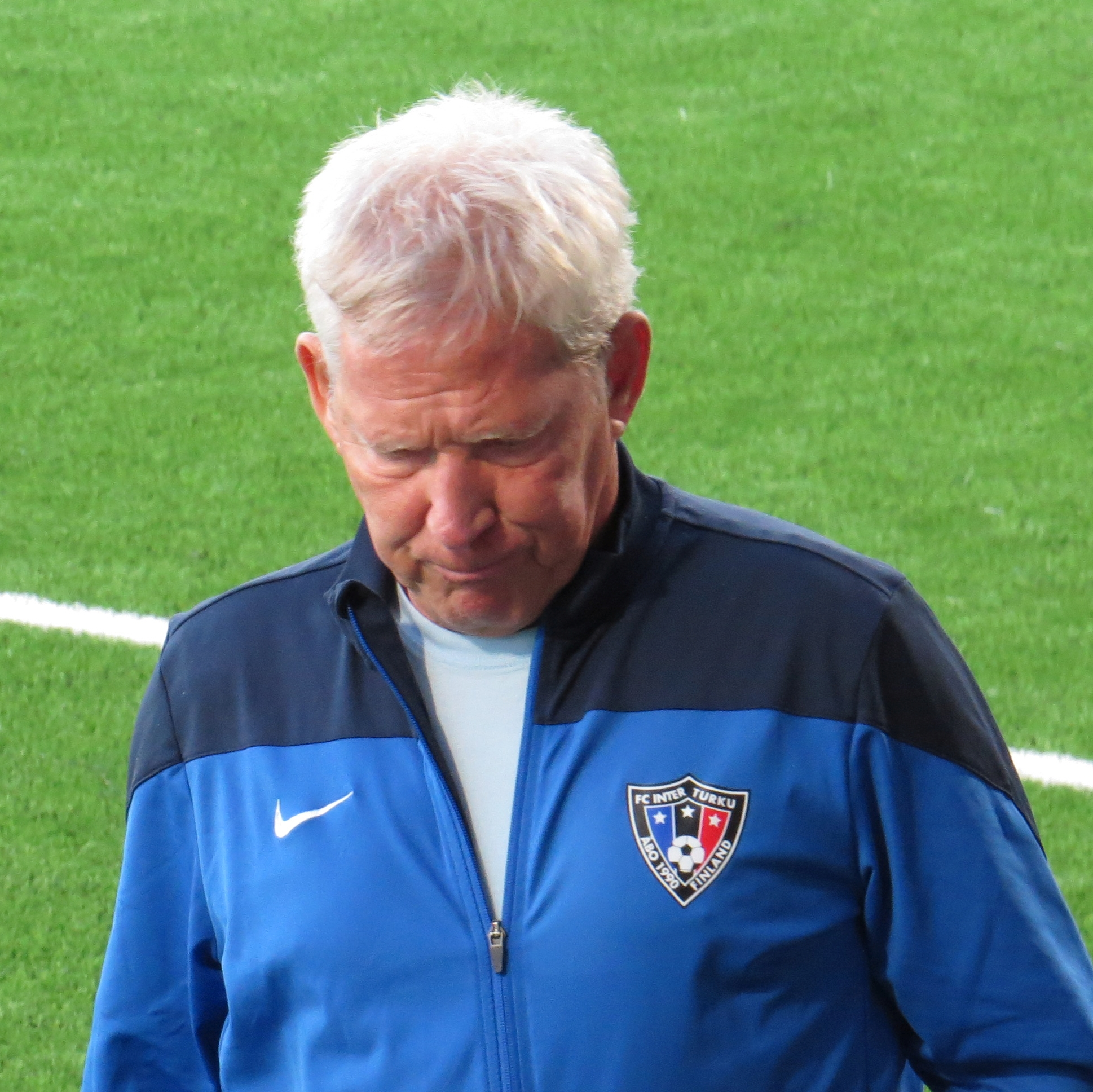

Personal information
- Full name: Jan Jochen Dragtsma
- Date of birth: 23 October 1955 (age 71)
- Place of birth: Alkmaar, Netherlands

Managerial career
- Years: Team
- 1995–1996: Z.A.P.
- 1996–2001: AFC '34
- 2001–2004: AZ (assistant)
- 2004–2005: FC Volendam
- 2007–2016: FC Inter Turku

Jan Jochen Dragtsma (born 23 October 1955) is a Dutch football manager, who was the coach of FC Volendam for around a year (2004–2005). He also managed FC Inter Turku in Finland, with whom he won the national title in 2008, Finnish League Cup in 2008 and the Finnish Cup in 2009. He resigned from FC Inter in May 2016.

In August 2010 he was linked in the Finnish press to the Finland national football team as a possible replacement for Stuart Baxter. Dragtsma is fluent in Dutch, English, Finnish and Swedish.

== Honours ==
Individual

- Veikkausliiga Coach of the Month: June 2010, May 2011, April 2015, September 2015
