= Pekka Lyyski =

Finnish football manager

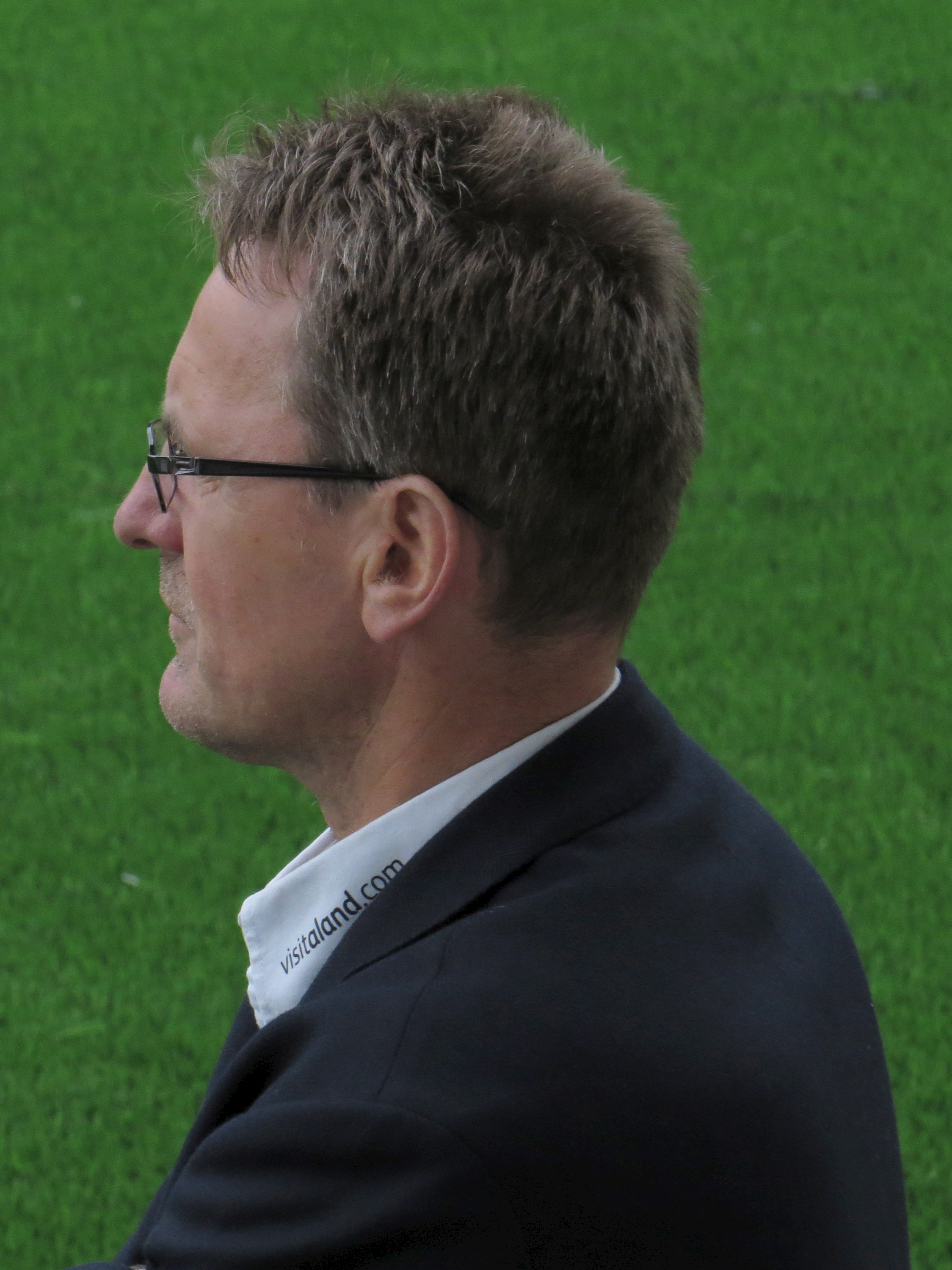
- Lyyski as IFK Mariehamn manager in 2015

Personal information
- Date of birth: 26 July 1953 (age 73)
- Place of birth: Kokkola, Finland

Youth career
- GBK

Senior career*
Years	Team	Apps	(Gls)
- GBK
- IFK Mariehamn

Managerial career
- 2003–2015: IFK Mariehamn
- * Club domestic league appearances and goals

Pekka Lyyski (born July 26, 1953) is a Finnish former football coach.

In 2003 Lyyski took charge of the IFK Mariehamn and brought the team in two years from Kakkonen to Veikkausliiga for the 2005 season for the first time in club history. He served as the coach of Mariehamn for 12 years before retiring in 2015. In his last season, Mariehamn won the 2015 Finnish Cup.

His son Jani played for IFK Mariehamn.

== Honours ==
IFK Mariehamn

- Finnish Cup: 2015

Individual

- Finnish Football Manager of the Year: 2013
- Veikkausliiga Manager of the Month: April 2009, July 2010, April 2013, August 2014
