= Kari Martonen =

Finnish footballer and manager (born 1963)

Personal information
- Date of birth: 13 March 1963 (age 63)
- Place of birth: Valkeakoski, Finland
- Position: Defender

Senior career*
Years	Team	Apps	(Gls)
1982–1989	HJK	104	(16)
1990–1996	FC Haka	144	(6)

Managerial career
- 2001–2005: Haka (assistant/youth coach)
- 2006–2009: Honka (assistant)
- 2007–2013: Finland U21 (assistant)
- 2010–2013: JJK
- 2015–2016: Haka (assistant)
- 2017–2022: Finland (assistant)
- 2023: Haka (assistant)
- * Club domestic league appearances and goals

Kari Martonen (born 13 March 1963) is a Finnish football manager and former player.

As a player, he played in total of 248 matches and scored 22 goals for HJK and FC Haka. After retiring as a player, he started working as a youth coach at his former club Haka and soon became the assistant manager under Olli Huttunen. In 2006, he became the assistant manager under Mika Lehkosuo at FC Honka.

In November 2009 as Ville Priha was sacked from JJK, Martonen took over as a head coach, signing a three-year contract with JJK.

He was named the chief executive office of SJK Seinäjoki on 14 December 2013.

== Honours ==
=== As player ===
- Mestaruussarja: 1985, 1987, 1988
- Veikkausliiga: 1995
- Finnish Cup: 1982

=== As coach ===
- Veikkausliiga: 2004
- Finnish Cup: 2002

Individual

- Veikkausliiga Coach of the Month: April 2010, September 2011,
