= Regillio Nooitmeer =

Dutch footballer (born 1983)

Regi Nooitmeer
Personal information
- Full name: Regillio Nooitmeer
- Date of birth: 16 July 1983 (age 43)
- Place of birth: Rotterdam, Netherlands
- Height: 1.85 m (6 ft 1 in)
- Position: Defender

Youth career
- 1994–2001: Sparta Rotterdam

Senior career*
Years	Team	Apps	(Gls)
2001–2004	Dordrecht	28	(0)
2004	Luzern	5	(0)
2005	VfR Aalen	5	(0)
2005–2006	Verbroedering Meerhout	12	(0)
2006	Xerxes	21	(1)
2006–2007	Neptunus	15	(2)
2007–2008	Galway United	42	(0)
2008–2009	Neptunus	29	(2)
2009–2010	Leonidas	17	(2)
2010–2011	Haka	43	(4)
2012	Birkirkara	1	(0)
2012	Leonidas	17	(0)
2013–2014	Haka	50	(1)
2015–2017	Leonidas	10	(0)
2017–2018	VV Hillegersberg		

International career
2003	Netherlands U21	3	(0)
2008	Haiti	1	(0)
- * Club domestic league appearances and goals

Regillio "Regi" Nooitmeer (born 16 July 1983) is a Dutch-born Haitian former footballer who played as a defender. He has played for the senior Haiti national team, having previously represented the Netherlands at under-21 level.

== Career ==
He was released by Irish club Galway United of the League of Ireland, due to the club's financial difficulties. Nooitmeer joined Galway United in 2007 on a two-year deal.

In 2008, he was scheduled to move to Drogheda United. He agreed a two-year contract with the club but a heart condition was discovered in his medical with Drogheda. Nooitmeer was forced to retire temporarily from the game whilst undergoing extensive medical testing to prove the original diagnosis was incorrect. He has since been proven fully fit.

He returned to the Netherlands and signed with SC Neptunus Rotterdam.

In 2010, Nooitmeer joined FC Haka in Finland, where he played as a central defender. He made 23 league appearance and scored 3 goals during the 2010 season.

He is 6 ft 1 in (1.85 m) tall and weights 12 st 11 lb (81 kg)

== International career ==
In March 2008 he made his international debut for Haiti in a 3-1 loss to Ecuador.

His international career was cut short by the mis-diagnosed heart condition.
