= Papa Niang =

Senegalese footballer

Personal information
- Full name: Papa Amadou Niang
- Date of birth: 5 December 1988 (age 37)
- Place of birth: Dakar, Senegal
- Height: 1.72 m (5 ft 8 in)
- Positions: Forward; winger

Senior career*
Years	Team	Apps	(Gls)
2005–2006	ASC Thiès	19	
2007	FC OPA	31	
2008	AC Oulu		
2009–2012	FF Jaro	101	(26)
2013	FC Vostok	23	(5)
2013–2014	Al-Shabab SC		
2014–2015	CF Mounana		
2016–2018	FF Jaro	41	(12)
2018	Minerva Punjab	4	(0)
2019–2020	FF Jaro	18	(3)

International career
	Senegal	8	(3)
- * Club domestic league appearances and goals

Papa Amadou Niang (born 5 December 1988) is a Senegalese former professional football player who played as a forward or winger. He represented Senegal in African Cup of Nations. He is the younger brother of Senegalese international Mamadou Niang.

== Club career ==
Niang began his professional career in Senegalese club ASC Thiès. Papa is well known for his stint with Finnish side FF Jaro, where he played from 2009 to 2012, 2016-2018 and most recently from 2018 to 2020. He scored 37 goals for the club in the Ykkönen.

He also played for Finnish side FC OPA, AC Oulu, Bolivian side Club Real América, Gabonese side CF Mounana, Kazakh club FC Vostok, Kuwaiti outfit Al-Shabab SC (Al Ahmadi). In 2018, he signed with I-League side Minerva Punjab FC.

== International career ==
Niang debuted for Senegal against Botswana in 2010. He earned eight international caps and scored three goals for his home nation.
