= Sasha Anttilainen =

Soviet Union-born Finnish footballer (born 1986)

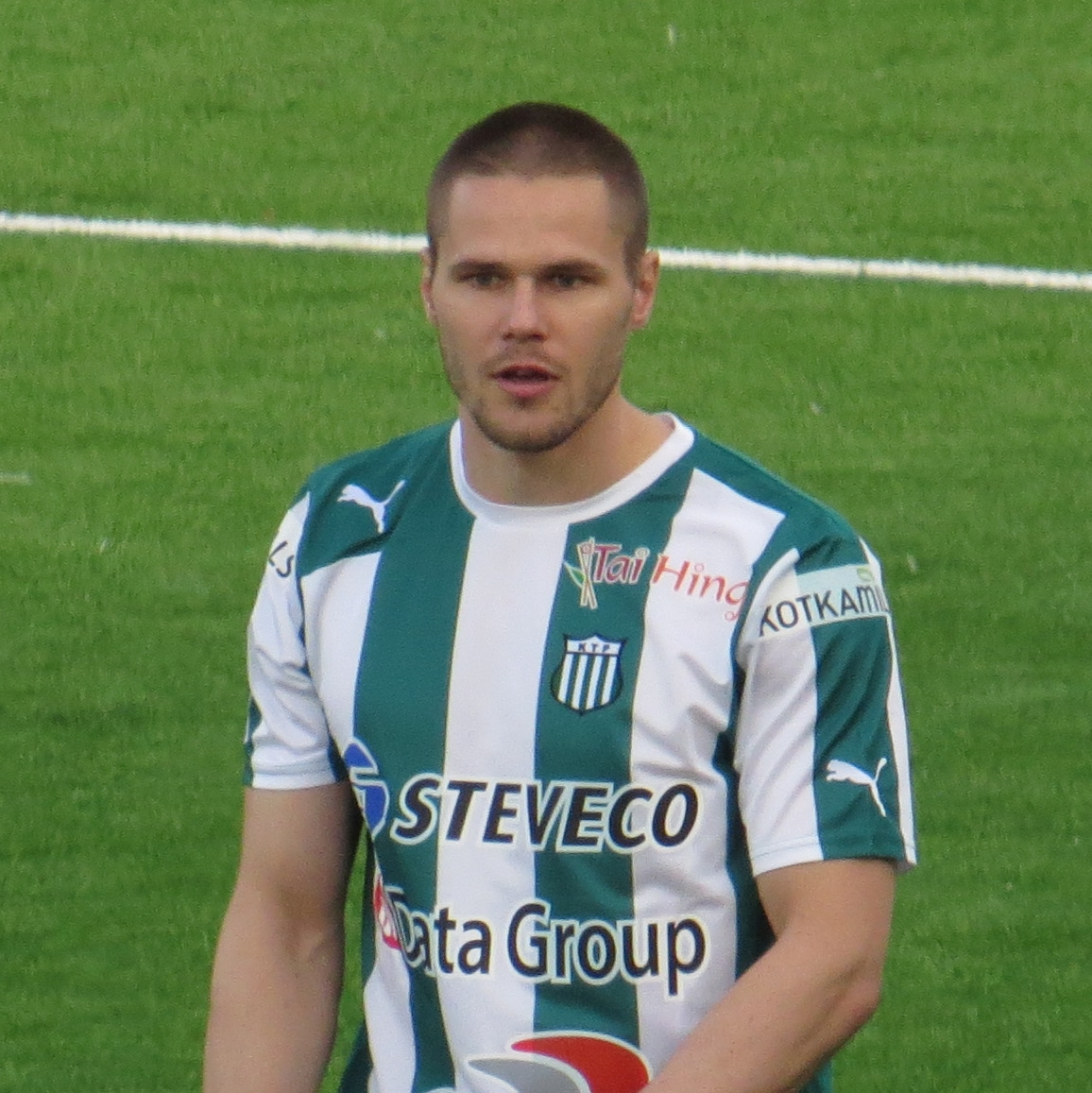

Personal information
- Full name: Aleksandr Anttilainen
- Date of birth: 19 December 1986 (age 39)
- Place of birth: Leningrad, USSR
- Height: 1.84 m (6 ft 1/2 in)
- Position: Forward

Youth career
- 2004: FC Zenit St. Petersburg

Senior career*
| Years | Team | Apps | (Gls) |
| 2005–2007 | Dinaburg | 1 | (0) |
| 2006–2007 | → Jippo (loan) | 45 | (8) |
| 2008 | KooTeePee | 22 | (1) |
| 2009–2010 | IFK Mariehamn | 33 | (5) |
| 2011–2015 | MYPA | 58 | (11) |
| 2015 | KTP | 10 | (2) |
- * Club domestic league appearances and goals

Aleksandr (Sasha) Anttilainen (born 19 December 1986) is a retired Soviet Union-born Finnish football player.

== Career ==
Anttilainen formerly played for KooTeePee, Jippo and Dinaburg. He has also played in the Zenit St. Petersburg academy team.

== Personal ==
Anttilainen moved to Joensuu, Finland with his family at the age of four. His parents are Russians of Finnish descent.
