= Henri Lehtonen =

Finnish footballer (born 1980)

Personal information
- Date of birth: 28 July 1980 (age 46)
- Place of birth: Turku, Finland
- Height: 1.77 m (5 ft 10 in)
- Position: Left back

Senior career*
Years	Team	Apps	(Gls)
1998–2001	Inter Turku	17	(3)
2001–2004	VG-62	47	(16)
2004–2017	Inter Turku	350	(49)
- * Club domestic league appearances and goals

Henri Lehtonen (born 28 July 1980) is a Finnish former professional footballer.

== Honours ==
Individual

- Veikkausliiga Player of the Month: June 2010,
