= Kymenlaakson Sähkö Stadion =

Stadium in Kouvola, Finland

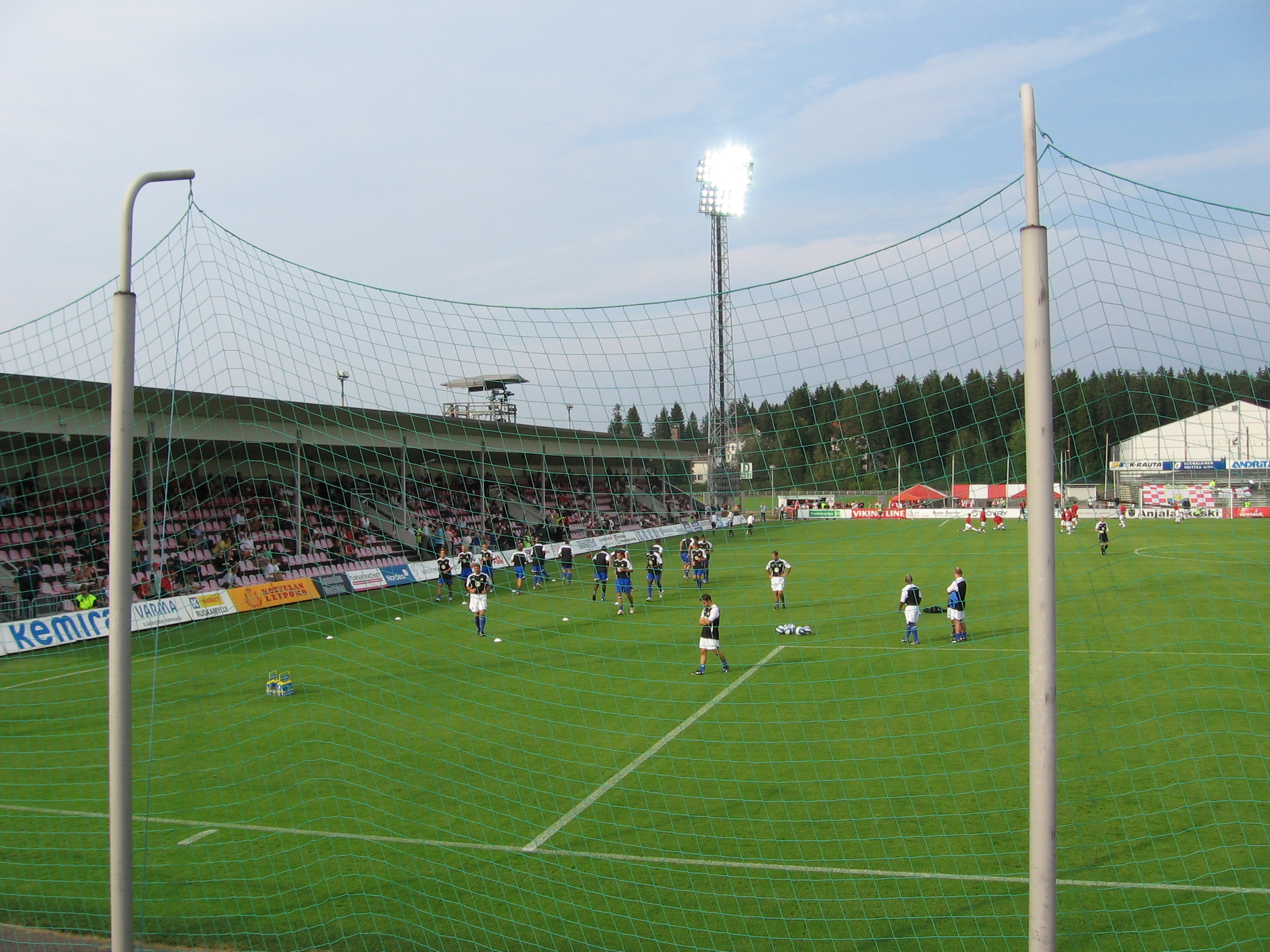
- Interactive map of Kymenlaakson Sähkö Stadion
- Full name: Kymenlaakson Sähkö Stadion
- Former names: Saviniemen Jalkapallostadion, Anjalankosken Jalkapallostadion
- Coordinates: 60°46′22″N 26°47′25″E
- Owner: City of Kouvola
- Capacity: 4,167 (3,004 covered)
- Surface: Artificial turf
- Field size: 105 m x 68 m

Construction
- Built: 1994–1995
- Opened: 1995

Tenant
- MYPA

Kymenlaakson Sähkö Stadion (formerly Saviniemen Jalkapallostadion and Anjalankosken Jalkapallostadion) is a multi-use stadium in Kouvola, Finland. It is currently used mostly for football matches and is the home stadium of MYPA. The stadium holds 4,167 and was built in 1995. The stadium has hosted several Europa League qualifying matches, including three in the 2010–11 tournament when MYPA were eliminated in the 3rd qualifying round by Romanian Club Timișoara.
