= Harjun stadion =

Stadium in Jyväskylä, Finland

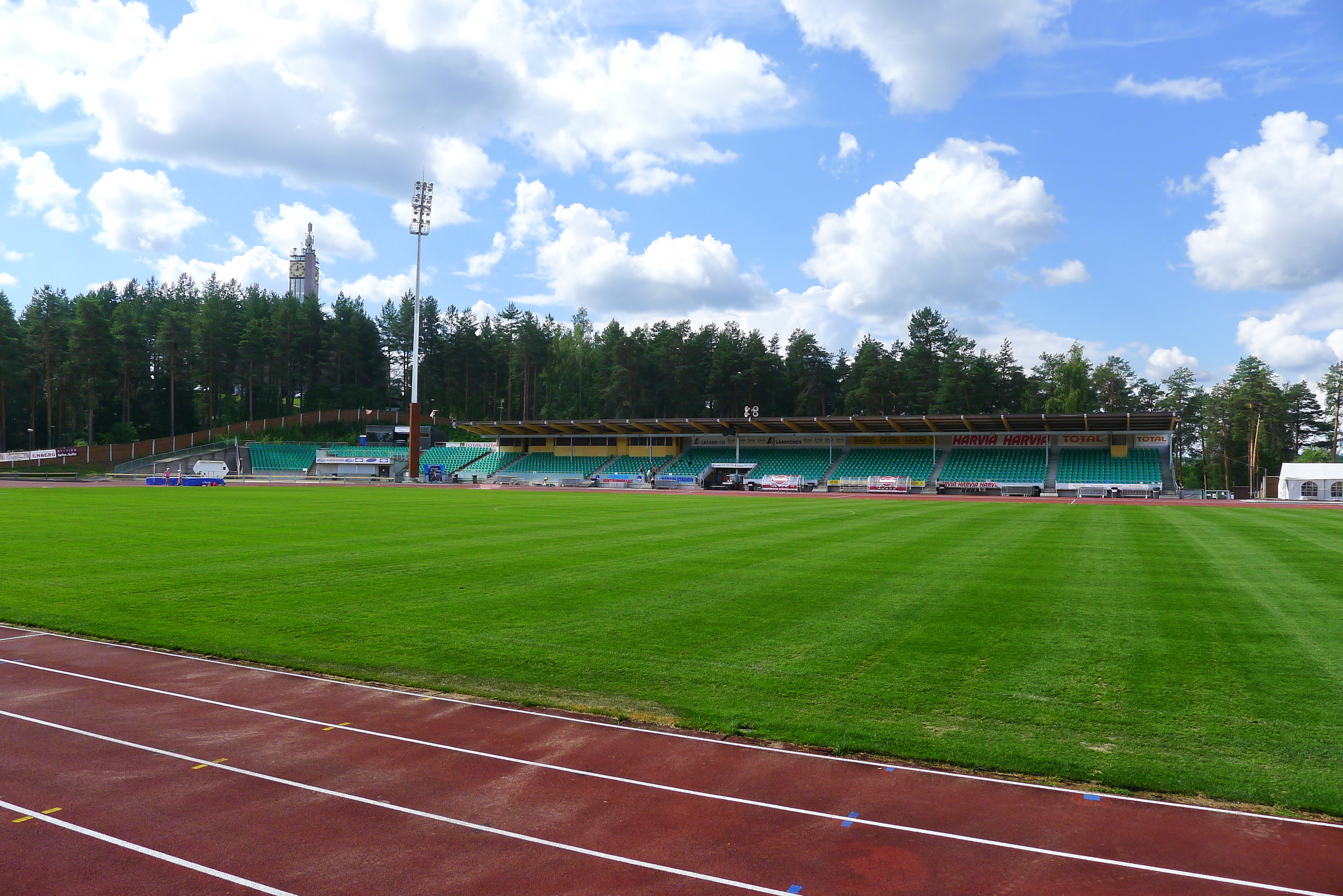
- Interactive map of Harjun stadion
- Location: Jyväskylä, Finland
- Coordinates: 62°14′41″N 025°44′27″E
- Owner: City of Jyväskylä
- Operator: City of Jyväskylä
- Capacity: 5,000

Construction
- Opened: 1926

Tenant
- JJK

Harjun stadion is an athletics and football stadium in Jyväskylä, Finland. It is the home stadium of a local football club JJK that currently plays in Ykkönen. The stadium holds 5,000 spectators and was opened in 1926.

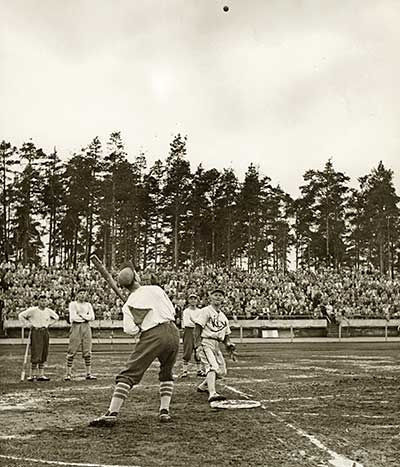
Harju has also hosted pesäpallo games in the past.
