= Jakobstads Centralplan =

Sports venue in Jakobstad, Finland

Coordinates: 63°40′25″N 22°41′42″E

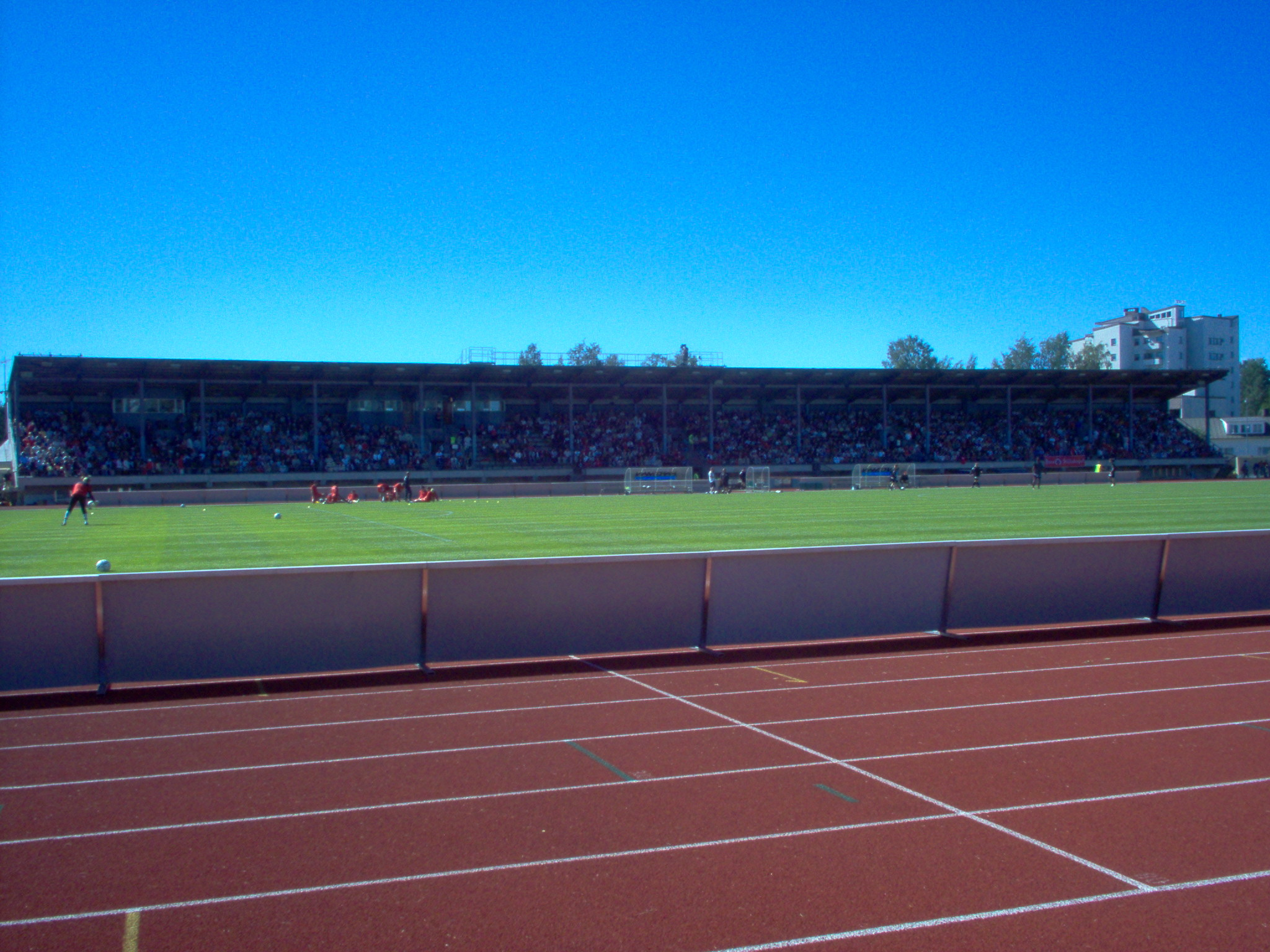
- Interactive map of Jakobstads Centralplan
- Location: Jakobstad, Finland
- Owner: City of Jakobstad
- Capacity: 5,000
- Field size: 105 × 68 m

Construction
- Opened: 1971
- Renovated: 2003

Tenant
- FF Jaro

Jakobstads Centralplan (Finnish: Pietarsaaren keskuskenttä) is a multi-use stadium in Jakobstad, Finland. It is currently used mostly for football matches and is the home stadium of FF Jaro. The stadium holds 5,000.
