= Kupittaa Football Stadium =

Stadium in Turku, Finland

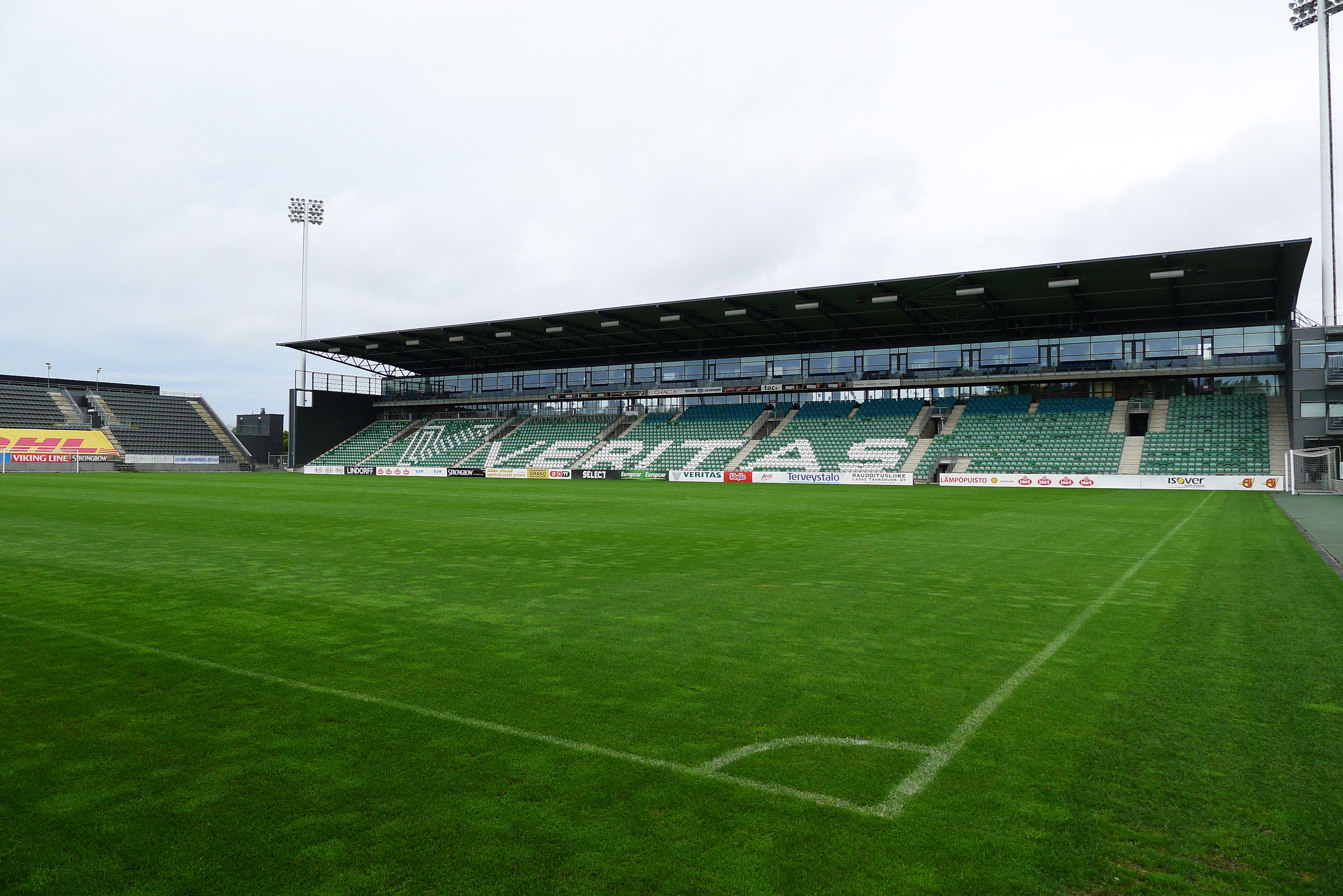
- Interior of the stadium in 2015
- Interactive map of Kupittaa Football Stadium
- Full name: Kupittaan jalkapallostadion
- Location: Turku, Finland
- Coordinates: 60°26′34″N 22°17′30″E
- Owner: City of Turku
- Operator: City of Turku
- Capacity: 9,072
- Surface: Artificial turf
- Field size: 105 x 68 m

Construction
- Opened: 1952
- Expanded: 2003, 2009, 2023

Tenants
- FC Inter Turku; Turun Palloseura

Kupittaa Football Stadium (Finnish: Kupittaan jalkapallostadion; Swedish: Kuppis fotbollsstadion), officially Veritas Stadion for sponsorship reasons since 2003, is a football stadium in Turku, Finland. It is situated in the district of Kupittaa, in an area dedicated to sporting venues. The stadium serves as the home venue for the Veikkausliiga clubs FC Inter Turku and Turun Palloseura. Since 2023, the stadium has a capacity of 9,072 spectators.

== History ==
The old Olympic stand (Olympiakatsomo) was built for the 1952 Summer Olympics and was designed by architect Erik Bryggman. The new, modern main stand was built in 2003.

The stadium underwent an expansion in 2009, when a stand with 1,644 seats was built to meet the demands for the UEFA Women's Euro 2009.

The natural grass field was replaced with an artificial turf in 2023, and a new stand was built in the eastern end of the ground.

The Kupittaa Stadium's record attendance is approximately 16,000 for the match between Brazil and the Netherlands during the 1952 Summer Olympics. For club tournaments the record attendance is 15,000 spectators for the 1987–88 UEFA Cup match between Turun Palloseura and Inter Milan. The stadium's record attendance since the 2003 renovation is 9,125 spectators, set at a match between Inter Turku and Kuopion Palloseura in 2019.
