= JJK Jyväskylä =

Finnish football club

JJK
- Full name: JJK Jyväskylä ry. (Jyväskylän Jalkapalloklubi)
- Nickname: Ketut (The Foxes)
- Founded: 2000 (1992)
- Ground: Harjun Stadion
- Capacity: 5,000
- Chairman: Tom Nevanpää
- Manager: Brian Page
- League: Ykkönen
- 2026: Ykkönen, 6th of 12
- Website: jjk.fi
Home colours	Away colours

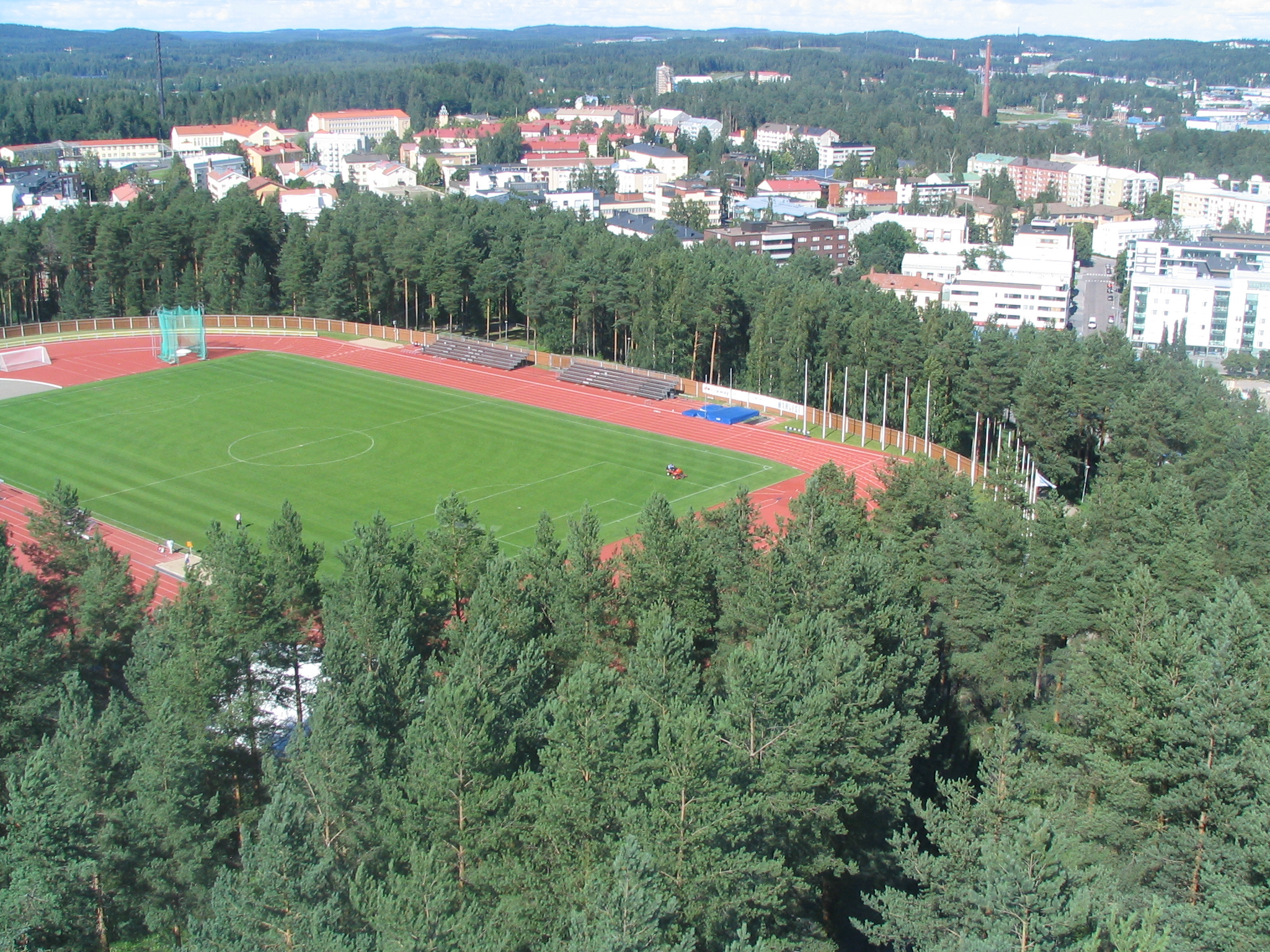
Harjun Stadion – aerial view

Jyväskylän Jalkapalloklubi (lit. 'Jyväskylä Football Club'), commonly referred to as JJK Jyväskylä or simply JJK, is a Finnish football club, based in Jyväskylä. JJK plays its home matches at Harjun Stadion.

== History ==
=== Early years 1923–1992 ===
Jyväskylän Palloilijat (abbreviated JyP), the predecessor of JJK, was founded in December 1923. In addition to football JyP had also a pesäpallo team and a bandy team. In the JJK's first football match it was defeated 2–3 by Mikkelin Kilpaveikot. In its early years, JyP played football infrequently and usually worked just to make the game of football known in the city. JyP began competing in football leagues in 1928 when it was beaten in a qualification match by Savo in the regional league. In 1939, JyP qualified for the first time to play in the second highest level of Finnish football leagues.

Nevertheless, World War II halted the promising progress of the team. In 1941, JyP played against a friendly match against a German military team. As many as 6000 spectators followed the match in Harjun Stadion.

In the following years, JyP played in the Finnish lower divisions, from the 3rd tier to 6th tier, but in 1976 JyP managed to rise to Kakkonen (third tier). In the next year, a new organisation was founded for the football team. The new team was named JYP-77. In the beginning of 1980s JYP-77 played couple of years in the First Division. But, 1992 the team relegated again to Kolmonen (fourth tier).

=== New JJK 1992–2006 ===
In autumn 1992 football managers in Jyväskylä decided that a reform is needed in football in Jyväskylä. JYP-77 merged with JyPK (Jyväskylän Pallokerho) and formed a new team JJK (Jyväskylän Jalkapalloklubi). Already first season was a success and JJK was promoted to Kakkonen (third tier) in 1993. 1994 JJK was far from the top of the league even though Mika Väyrynen won the top scorer award of the league with 22 goals. In 1995 JJK won a qualifier against KPT-85 and was promoted to Ykkönen (second tier).

In the Ykkönen JJK played strongly especially at home, where it was defeated only once. Ville Priha and Sükrü Uzuner were some of the leading heroes of the team. Also audience found Harju and a match against Kuusysi Lahti had already 2547 spectators.

Season 1997 ended in a catastrophe. Even though the team had invested a lot to the new season it relegated back to Kakkonen (third tier). JJK could not promote back during next seasons. When JJK Juniors in 2000 managed to promote also to Kakkonen a new reform was started. The name was changed to JJK Jyväskylä. Nevertheless, JJK could not promote back to the Ykkönen.

Between 2000 and 2006 the team lost a lot of gifted juniors including Jukka Sinisalo, Touko Tumanto, Mikko Manninen to teams playing on higher levels.

=== From a black hole to the top 2006–2011 ===
During unsuccessful decades Central Finland was nicknamed a black hole of Finnish football. Jyväskylä was the only major Finnish city, which had not had a football team in the top league. In 2006 Ville Priha returned to his home city – this time as a coach. The new coach with his team including Lassi Lehtonen, Jussi Hakasalo and a young promising striker Tommi Kari celebrated in the end of the season a promotion back to Ykkönen.

Before the 2007 season, JJK got new strengthenings with a defender Jukka Sinisalo returning from FC Inter, midfielder Matti Lähitie and striker Babatunde Wusu from Mikkeli. The team ended up being third in the league. The team continued to strengthen with Markus Paija, Mika Lahtinen, Anssi Viren and Ady. The hero of team Babatunde Wusu capped in the last game against PS Kemi and secured a historic moment for Jyväskylä – a promotion to the Veikkausliiga (highest level).

First top league season 2009 was not easy for JJK even though Jukka-Pekka Tuomanen from Jaro and Christian Sund joined the team. It finished playing relegation games but managed to win them. Nevertheless, the average number of spectators was third highest in the league, 3238 per game.

2010 was not easier but 2011 JJK exploded the bank. The team finished 3rd in the league and celebrated the first medal in its history in Finnish Veikkausliiga. This meant also that in 2012 JJK plays for the first time in its history in UEFA European League.

=== JJK in Europe ===
Third place in the league in 2011 qualified the club to play in the 2012-13 UEFA Europa League. JJK played in the first qualification round in the UEFA Europa League in season 2012–13. In the first round JJK played against Norwegian Stabæk and won with the aggregate score 4–3. In the second round JJK faced FK Zeta from Montenegro, and lost based on the away goals rule (aggregate score 3–3).

The league season, however, was lukewarm compared to the previous with the club finishing in ninth place.

=== Anniversary of football in Jyväskylä and relegation ===
During the 2013 season the club planned to celebrate the 90th anniversary of club football history in Jyväskylä. The pre-season went well as the club beat for example HJK in the Finnish League Cup and reached the finals. As the Veikkausliiga season started, the difficulties began. Eero Markkanen, who was responsible for scoring the most goals pre-season, was injured in the season opener and injuries plagued the team throughout the season. After Midsummer, JJK was in last place.

About in the middle of the season, a draw in the home game against RoPS drove the club to change its manager mid-season for the second time in its history. Kari Martonen was replaced by the team's former player, assistant coach Juha Pasoja. The change was followed by a brief improvement in the team's play, but at the end of the season, however, the team was relegated back to Ykkönen, eventually with quite clear figures. The positive feature was how in particular towards the end of the season some younger, home-grown players rose to the team in place of some more experienced players who were injured. For example, the young stopper Severi Vielma and the midfielder Robert Taylor, who had just returned to his hometown after a few years in England, made their way to the starting lineup.

The season was dramatic for the club also outside the field. Poor financial situation forced the club to ask for help from their supporters. As part of the "Emme anna sen päättyä" (lit. 'We won't allow it to end') -campaign the club sold various products and collected over 90 000 euros, which allowed the club to continue operation to the next season.

For the season 2014 in Ykkönen, the team was reorganized as many experienced players left and young, home-grown players were brought in their place. Long-time players Janne Korhonen and Mikko Manninen stayed in the team, however, and took also some coaching duties. Tommi Kari, who had played for FC Lahti for two years, returned to JJK and was later elected as the team captain for the season 2014. Many young players were brought in from the youth teams, such as Aleksis Lehtonen, Joona Itkonen and the goalkeeper Teppo Marttinen. During the spring of 2014 the team made to the top eight in the Finnish Cup beating for example Veikkausliiga team TPS.

== Season to season ==
=== Domestic ===
Season to season of JJK

Season	Level	Division	Section	Administration	Position	Movements
1993	Tier 4	Kolmonen (Third Division)	Group 5	Finnish FA (Suomen Pallolitto)	1st	Promoted
1994	Tier 3	Kakkonen (Second Division)	East Group	Finnish FA (Suomen Palloliitto)	5th	
1995	Tier 3	Kakkonen (Second Division)	East Group	Finnish FA (Suomen Palloliitto)	2nd	Promoted
1996	Tier 2	Ykkönen (First Division)	North Group	Finnish FA (Suomen Palloliitto)	6th	
1997	Tier 2	Ykkönen (First Division)	North Group	Finnish FA (Suomen Palloliitto)	3rd	Promotion Group – 6th
1998	Tier 2	Ykkönen (First Division)	North Group	Finnish FA (Suomen Palloliitto)	8th	Relegation Group South – Relegated
1999	Tier 3	Kakkonen (Second Division)	South Group	Finnish FA (Suomen Palloliitto)	4th	
2000	Tier 3	Kakkonen (Second Division)	East Group	Finnish FA (Suomen Palloliitto)	4th	
2001	Tier 3	Kakkonen (Second Division)	East Group	Finnish FA (Suomen Palloliitto)	8th	
2002	Tier 3	Kakkonen (Second Division)	East Group	Finnish FA (Suomen Palloliitto)	3rd	
2003	Tier 3	Kakkonen (Second Division)	East Group	Finnish FA (Suomen Palloliitto)	4th	
2004	Tier 3	Kakkonen (Second Division)	East Group	Finnish FA (Suomen Palloliitto)	1st	Playoffs
2005	Tier 3	Kakkonen (Second Division)	East Group	Finnish FA (Suomen Palloliitto)	7th	
2006	Tier 3	Kakkonen (Second Division)	Group A	Finnish FA (Suomen Palloliitto)	1st	Promoted
2007	Tier 2	Ykkönen (First Division)		Finnish FA (Suomen Palloliitto)	3rd	
2008	Tier 2	Ykkönen (First Division)		Finnish FA (Suomen Palloliitto)	1st	Promoted
2009	Tier 1	Veikkausliiga (Premier League)		Finnish FA (Suomen Palloliitto)	13th	Relegation Playoff
2010	Tier 1	Veikkausliiga (Premier League)		Finnish FA (Suomen Palloliitto)	13th	Relegation Playoff
2011	Tier 1	Veikkausliiga (Premier League)		Finnish FA (Suomen Palloliitto)	3rd	UEFA Europa League First qualifying round
2012	Tier 1	Veikkausliiga (Premier League)		Finnish FA (Suomen Palloliitto)	9th	
2013	Tier 1	Veikkausliiga (Premier League)		Finnish FA (Suomen Palloliitto)	12th	Relegated
2014	Tier 2	Ykkönen (First Division)		Finnish FA (Suomen Palloliitto)	7th	
2015	Tier 2	Ykkönen (First Division)		Finnish FA (Suomen Palloliitto)	4th	
2016	Tier 2	Ykkönen (First Division)		Finnish FA (Suomen Palloliitto)	1st	Promoted
2017	Tier 1	Veikkausliiga (Premier League)		Finnish FA (Suomen Palloliitto)	12th	Relegated
2018	Tier 2	Ykkönen (First Division)		Finnish FA (Suomen Pallolitto)	9th	Relegated
2019	Tier 4	Kolmonen (Third Division)	East Group	Finnish FA (Suomen Pallolitto)	1st	Promoted
2020	Tier 3	Kakkonen (Second Division)	Group C	Finnish FA (Suomen Palloliitto)	6th	
2021	Tier 3	Kakkonen (Second Division)	Group C	Finnish FA (Suomen Palloliitto)	2nd	
2022	Tier 3	Kakkonen (Second Division)	Group C	Finnish FA (Suomen Palloliitto)	1st	Promoted
2023	Tier 2	Ykkönen (First Division)		Finnish FA (Suomen Pallolitto)	12th	Relegated
2024	Tier 3	Ykkönen (First Division)		Finnish FA (Suomen Palloliitto)	7th	
2025	Tier 3	Ykkönen (First Division)		Finnish FA (Suomen Palloliitto)	?	

- 6 seasons in Veikkausliiga
- 10 seasons in Ykkösliiga
- 15 seasons in 3rd Tier
- 2 seasons in 4th Tier

=== UEFA club competition record ===
Season	Competition	Round	Club	Home	Away	Aggregate
2012–13	UEFA Europa League	1Q	(Norway) Stabæk	2–0	2–3	4–3
2012–13	UEFA Europa League	2Q	(Montenegro) FK Zeta	3–2	0–1	3–3 (a)

Notes

- 1Q: First qualifying round
- 2Q: Second qualifying round

== Supporters ==
The supporter group of the club is called Harjun Pojat ("Boys of Harju"), named after that club's home stadium.

== Current squad ==
As of 3 September 2026

Note: Flags indicate national team as defined under FIFA eligibility rules; some limited exceptions apply. Players may hold more than one non-FIFA nationality.

No.	Pos.	Nation	Player
1	GK	FIN	Lauri-Eemil Vetri
2	DF	FIN	Samuel Kähari
3	DF	FIN	Berat Akdogan
4	DF	FIN	Valtteri Kangasniemi
5	MF	FIN	Shirman Osso
6	DF	DOM	Alex Ciriaco
7	MF	FIN	Benjamin Montonen
8	MF	FIN	Tuuka Pahkala
9	MF	FIN	Arjan Goljahanpoor
10	MF	NGR	Jonathan Dunyin
11	MF	FIN	Eevert Sainila
12	FW	FIN	Jonatan Laakso
14	DF	FIN	Lauri Suutarinen
15	FW	FIN	Lenni Rainerma
16	MF	FIN	Niki Patjas
17	FW	NGR	Peter Uzezi Imonioro

No.	Pos.	Nation	Player
18	FW	FIN	Alvar Tuppurainen
19	FW	FIN	Nikolas Liimatainen
20	MF	FIN	Akusti Jalasvaara
21	DF	FIN	Onni Schroderus
22	MF	FIN	Daniel Wacklin
23	DF	FIN	Verneri Maunuksela
25	DF	FIN	Veiko Ojala
26	MF	FIN	Miska Lundell
29	DF	FIN	Vilho Virén
30	GK	FIN	Aleksi Oikarinen
31	MF	PLE	Mahmoud Mahmoud
33	DF	FIN	Alex Tolra
36	DF	FIN	Atte Salmi
52	DF	FIN	Jarkko Heimonen
72	DF	FIN	Kaarlo Rintamäki

=== Out on loan ===
Note: Flags indicate national team as defined under FIFA eligibility rules; some limited exceptions apply. Players may hold more than one non-FIFA nationality.

No.	Pos.	Nation	Player

== Management and boardroom ==
=== Management ===
As of 5 August 2018

Name	Role
(Finland) Mikko Manninen	Manager
(Finland) Janne Korhonen	Manager, Goalkeeper Coach
(Finland) Antti Luhta	Fitness Coach, Physiotherapist
(Finland) Isaac Hamdi	Coach
(Finland) Tapani Korhonen	Team Director
(Finland) Oskari Ervasti	Doctor

=== Boardroom ===
As of 1 January 2018

Name	Role
(Finland) Lassi Hietanen	Chairman
(Finland) Caius Forsberg	CEO

== Managers ==
- (Finland) Markku Kekäläinen (1994–95)
- (Finland) Ilkka Hyvärinen (1994–95)
- (Finland) Markku Kekäläinen (1996)
- (Finland) Anssi Leino (1996)
- (Finland) Esa Kuusisto (1997)
- (Poland) Boguslaw Hajdas (1998)
- (Finland) Juha-Pekka Nuutinen (1999)
- (Finland) Heikki Nurmi (2000)
- (Finland) Matti Lahtinen (2001–02)
- (Finland) Ari Kautto (2003–05)
- (Finland) Markku Kekäläinen (2005)
- (Finland) Ville Priha (Jan 2006 – Dec 09)
- (Finland) Kari Martonen (Jan 2010 – Jun 13)
- (Finland) Juha Pasoja (Jun 2013–Mar 2018)
- (Finland) Mikko Manninen, Janne Korhonen (Mar 2018–)
