= 1999 UEFA Intertoto Cup =

Tournament details
- Dates: 19 June – 24 August 1999
- Teams: 60

Final positions
- Champions: (Italy) Juventus (England) West Ham United (France) Montpellier

Tournament statistics
- Matches played: 114
- Goals scored: 301 (2.64 per match)

The 1999 UEFA Intertoto Cup finals were won by Montpellier, Juventus, and West Ham United. All three teams advanced to the UEFA Cup.

== Invited teams ==
Invited teams for 1999 UEFA Intertoto Cup
Entry round	Teams			
Third round	Austria Wien (7th)	(England) West Ham United (5th)	(France) Rennes (5th)	(Germany) Hamburg (7th)
Third round	(Italy) Juventus (7th)	(Netherlands) Heerenveen (7th)	(Spain) Espanyol (7th)	(Turkey) Trabzonspor (4th)
Second round	Austria Lustenau (9th)	(Belgium) Lokeren (5th)	(Czech Republic) Boby Brno (7th)	(Denmark) Copenhagen (7th)
Second round	(France) Montpellier (8th)	(France) Metz (10th)	(Germany) Duisburg (8th)	(Italy) Perugia (14th)
Second round	(Norway) Brann (6th)	(Russia) Rostselmash (6th)	(Sweden) Hammarby (3rd)	(Turkey) Kocaelispor (5th)
First round	(Albania) Teuta Durrës (8th)	(Armenia) Ararat Yerevan (4th)	(Azerbaijan) Qarabağ (4th)	(Belarus) Lokomotiv-96 Vitebsk (4th)
First round	(Belarus) Gomel (5th)	(Belgium) Sint-Truiden (9th)	(Bosnia and Herzegovina) Jedinstvo Bihać (6th)	(Bulgaria) Spartak Varna (12th)
First round	(Croatia) Hrvatski Dragovoljac (5th)	(Croatia) Varteks (6th)	(Czech Republic) Hradec Králové (8th)	(Denmark) Herfølge Boldklub (5th)
First round	(Estonia) Narva Trans (4th)	(Faroe Islands) GÍ Gøta (4th)	(Finland) Jokerit (est .1999)	(Georgia (country)) Kolkheti-1913 Poti (4th)
First round	(Hungary) Vasas (6th)	(Iceland) ÍA (3rd)	(Israel) Maccabi Haifa (3rd)	(Latvia) Ventspils (3rd)
First round	(Lithuania) Ekranas (4th)	Union Luxembourg (4th)	(North Macedonia) Pobeda (3rd)	(North Macedonia) Cementarnica 55 (5th)
First round	(Malta) Floriana (5th)	(Moldova) Tiligul Tiraspol (3rd)	(Northern Ireland) Newry Town (4th)	(Norway) Vålerenga Fotball (7th)
First round	(Poland) Polonia Warsaw (5th)	(Republic of Ireland) Shelbourne (3rd)	(Romania) FCM Bacău (5th)	(Romania) Ceahlăul Piatra Neamţ (9th)
First round	(Slovakia) Ozeta Dukla Trenčín (5th)	(Slovakia) MŠK Žilina (6th)	(Slovenia) Rudar Velenje (3rd)	(Slovenia) Korotan Prevalje (5th)
First round	(Sweden) Halmstad (4th)	(Switzerland) Basel (5th)	(Switzerland) Neuchâtel Xamax (6th)	(Wales) Aberystwyth Town (4th)

== First round ==
Team 1	Agg.	Team 2	1st leg	2nd leg
Vålerenga Fotball (Norway)	1–2	(Latvia) Ventspils	1–0	0–2
Spartak Varna (Bulgaria)	1–8	(Belgium) Sint-Truiden	1–2	0–6
Polonia Warsaw (Poland)	4–0	(Moldova) Tiligul Tiraspol	4–0	0–0
Pobeda (North Macedonia)	4–4 (4–3 p)	(Slovakia) Ozeta Dukla Trenčín	3–1	1–3
Rudar Velenje (Slovenia)	2–2 (a)	(Sweden) Halmstad	0–0	2–2
Herfølge Boldklub (Denmark)	0–4	(Slovakia) MŠK Žilina	0–2	0–2
FCM Bacău (Romania)	0–2	(Armenia) Ararat Yerevan	0–1	0–1
Lokomotiv-96 Vitebsk (Belarus)	3–4	(Croatia) Varteks	1–2	2–2
Union Luxembourg	1–7	(Hungary) Vasas	1–3	0–4
Shelbourne (Republic of Ireland)	0–2	(Switzerland) Neuchâtel Xamax	0–0	0–2
Ceahlăul Piatra Neamţ (Romania)	2–0	(Lithuania) Ekranas	1–0	1–0
Hradec Králové (Czech Republic)	1–1 (1–3 p)	(Belarus) Gomel	1–0	0–1
Hrvatski Dragovoljac (Croatia)	1–2	(Northern Ireland) Newry Town	1–0	0–2
Maccabi Haifa (Israel)	2–2 (a)	(Azerbaijan) Qarabağ	1–2	1–0
Cementarnica 55 (North Macedonia)	8–2	(Georgia (country)) Kolkheti-1913 Poti	4–2	4–0
Korotan Prevalje (Slovenia)	0–6	(Switzerland) Basel	0–0	0–6
Jedinstvo Bihać (Bosnia and Herzegovina)	3–1	(Faroe Islands) GÍ Gøta	3–0	0–1
Aberystwyth Town (Wales)	3–4	(Malta) Floriana	2–2	1–2
ÍA (Iceland)	6–3	(Albania) Teuta Durrës	5–1	1–2
Jokerit (Finland)	7–1	(Estonia) Narva Trans	3–0	4–1

=== First leg ===
19 June 1999
16:00

Vålerenga (Norway)	1–0	(Latvia) Ventspils
Carew 53'

Ullevaal Stadion, Oslo
Attendance: 601
Referee: Oleg Chykun (Belarus)

19 June 1999
17:00

Spartak Varna (Bulgaria)	1–2	(Belgium) Sint-Truiden
Timnev 45'		van Oekelen 54'; Mertens 66'

Spartak Stadium, Varna
Attendance: 1,200
Referee: Wolfgang Stark (Germany)

19 June 1999
17:00

Polonia Warsaw (Poland)	4–0	(Moldova) Tiligul Tiraspol
Dąbrowski 50'; Olisadebe 54'; Moskal 61'; Vencevičius 67'

Stadion Polonii Warszawa, Warsaw
Attendance: 700
Referee: Ante Kulušić (Croatia)

20 June 1999
17:30

Pobeda (North Macedonia)	3–1	(Slovakia) Ozeta Dukla Trenčín
Oliveira 22', 30', 54'		Porázik 6'

Goce Delčev Stadium, Prilep
Attendance: 2,000
Referee: Richard O'Hanlon (Republic of Ireland)

19 June 1999
20:00

Rudar Velenje (Slovenia)	0–0	(Sweden) Halmstad

Ob Jezeru City Stadium, Velenje
Referee: Zbigniew Marczyk (Poland)

19 June 1999
15:00

Herfølge (Denmark)	0–2	(Slovakia) Žilina
		Mintál 48', 89'

Herfølge Stadion, Herfølge
Referee: Loizos Loizou (Cyprus)

19 June 1999

FCM Bacău (Romania)	0–1	(Armenia) Ararat Yerevan
		Antonyan 69'

Stadionul Municipal, Bacău
Attendance: 1,004
Referee: Michal Beneš (Czech Republic)

19 June 1999
17:00

Lokomotiv-96 Vitebsk (Belarus)	1–2	(Croatia) Varteks
Aleshchenko 51'		Mumlek 19', 65'

Dinamo Stadium, Minsk
Attendance: 1,200
Referee: Hubert Byrne (Republic of Ireland)

19 June 1999
18:00

Union Luxembourg	1–3	(Hungary) Vasas
J. Lauer 58'		Zombori 12'; Sowunmi 25', 78'

Stade Achille Hammerel, Luxembourg
Attendance: 305
Referee: Bujar Pregia (Albania)

20 June 1999

Shelbourne (Republic of Ireland)	0–0	(Switzerland) Neuchâtel Xamax

Tolka Park, Dublin
Attendance: 1,612
Referee: Ferenc Bede (Hungary)

20 June 1999
17:00

Ceahlăul Piatra Neamţ (Romania)	1–0	(Lithuania) Ekranas
Alistar 56'

Stadionul Ceahlăul, Piatra Neamț
Attendance: 3,000
Referee: Krsto Danilovski (Macedonia)

20 June 1999
17:00

Hradec Králové (Czech Republic)	1–0	(Belarus) Gomel
Záleský 78'

Všesportovní stadion, Hradec Králové
Attendance: 1,400
Referee: Oleg Timofejev (Estonia)

19 June 1999
18:00

Hrvatski Dragovoljac (Croatia)	1–0	(Northern Ireland) Newry Town
Miletić 53'

ŠRC Stanko Vlainić-Dida, Slavonski Brod
Attendance: 300
Referee: Amit Klein (Israel)

19 June 1999

Maccabi Haifa (Israel)	1–2	(Azerbaijan) Qarabağ
Masika 78'		Huseynov 27', 90'

The Municipal Stadium, Rishon LeZion
Attendance: 1,200
Referee: Anton Genov (Bulgaria)

19 June 1999
18:00

Cementarnica 55 (North Macedonia)	4–2	(Georgia (country)) Kolkheti-1913 Poti
Serafimovski 13', 45'; Ristovski 35'; Vujović 89'		Daraselia 20'; Khuchua 26'

Gradski Stadion, Skopje
Attendance: 2,000
Referee: Vladimir Antonov (Moldova)

20 June 1999
17:00

Korotan Prevalje (Slovenia)	0–0	(Switzerland) Basel
	Summary

Stadion na Prevaljah, Prevalje
Attendance: 2,000
Referee: Georgios Kasnaferis (Greece)

19 June 1999
18:00

Jedinstvo Bihać (Bosnia and Herzegovina)	3–0	(Faroe Islands) GÍ Gøta
Tulić 47'; Dujmović 75', 90'

Stadion pod Borićima, Bihać
Attendance: 6,600
Referee: Attila Abraham (Hungary)

20 June 1999

Aberystwyth Town (Wales)	2–2	(Malta) Floriana
Morrison 17', 85'		Buhagiar 32'; Camenzuli 63'

Park Avenue, Aberystwyth
Referee: Slavik Kazaryan (Armenia)

19 June 1999

ÍA (Iceland)	5–1	(Albania) Teuta
Haraldsson 23'; Hauksson 27', 45'; Matijane 77', 83'		Babamusta 16'

Akranesvöllur, Akranes
Attendance: 521
Referee: Nicolai Vollquartz (Denmark)

20 June 1999

Jokerit (Finland)	3–0	(Estonia) Narva Trans
Hiukka 3', 31', 44' (pen.)

Kauniaisten Keskuskenttä, Kauniainen
Attendance: 316
Referee: Lassin Isaksen (Faroe Islands)

=== Second leg ===
26 June 1999
17:00

Ventspils (Latvia)	2–0	(Norway) Vålerenga
Lukaševičs 40'; Vdovenko 61'

Daugava Stadium, Riga
Attendance: 500
Referee: Bragi Bergmann (Iceland)

Ventspils won 2–1 on aggregate.

26 June 1999
20:00

Sint-Truiden (Belgium)	6–0	(Bulgaria) Spartak Varna
Teppers 9'; Fiers 10', 46'; Vrancken 32'; Isaías 45'; Vangeel 69'

Stayen, Sint-Truiden
Attendance: 3,304
Referee: Bernhard Brugger (Austria)

Sint-Truiden won 8–1 on aggregate.

26 June 1999
17:00

Tiligul Tiraspol (Moldova)	0–0	(Poland) Polonia Warsaw

Stadionul Municipal, Tiraspol
Attendance: 2,000
Referee: Brian Lawlor (Wales)

Polonia Warsaw won 4–0 on aggregate.

26 June 1999
17:30

Ozeta Dukla Trenčín (Slovakia)	3–1 (a.e.t.)	(North Macedonia) Pobeda
Hanko 33'; Fabuš 35'; Horvatovič 88'		Glavevski 87'
Penalties
Horvatovič (penalty scored); Fabuš (penalty scored); Schulz (penalty scored); Hrnčár (penalty missed); Hanko (penalty missed)	3–4	(penalty scored) Dimitrijević; (penalty scored) Lazarevski; (penalty scored) Karanfilovski; (penalty scored) Grozdanov; (penalty missed) Risteski

Štadión na Sihoti, Trenčín
Attendance: 3,427
Referee: Asim Khudiev (Azerbaijan)

4–4 on aggregate. Pobeda won 4–3 on penalties.

27 June 1999
17:00

Halmstad (Sweden)	2–2	(Slovenia) Rudar Velenje
Bertilsson 23'; Carlsson 30'		Vidojević 39'; Podvinski 50'

Örjans Vall, Halmstad
Attendance: 1,200
Referee: Darius Miezelis (Lithuania)

2–2 on aggregate, Rudar Velenje won on away goals rule.

26 June 1999
17:30

Žilina (Slovakia)	2–0	(Denmark) Herfølge
Zátek 34'; Reiter 64'

Štadión pod Dubňom, Žilina
Attendance: 2,339
Referee: Jouni Hyytiä (Finland)

MŠK Žilina won 4–0 on aggregate.

26 June 1999
15:00

Ararat Yerevan (Armenia)	1–0	(Romania) FCM Bacău
Hovakimyan 67'

Vazgen Sargsyan Republican Stadium, Yerevan
Attendance: 1,500
Referee: Philippe Kalt (France)

Ararat Yerevan won 2–0 on aggregate.

26 June 1999
20:00

Varteks (Croatia)	2–2	(Belarus) Lokomotiv-96 Vitebsk
Matas 84'; Šafarić 87'		Dalić 33' (o.g.); Konoplev 77'

Stadion Varteks, Varaždin
Attendance: 1,606
Referee: Andrei Iacovlev (Moldova)

Varteks won 4–3 on aggregate.

26 June 1999
19:00

Vasas (Hungary)	4–0	Union Luxembourg
Galaschek 10' (pen.), 84' (pen.); Sowunmi 59', 87'

Stadion Rudolf Illovszky, Budapest
Attendance: 1,500
Referee: Džemal Čalija (Bosnia and Herzegovina)

Vasas won 7–1 on aggregate.

27 June 1999

Neuchâtel Xamax (Switzerland)	2–0	(Republic of Ireland) Shelbourne
N'Diaye 71'; Perret 79'

Stade de la Maladière, Neuchâtel
Attendance: 2,100
Referee: Edo Trivković (Croatia)

Neuchâtel Xamax won 2–0 on aggregate.

27 June 1999
17:30

Ekranas (Lithuania)	0–1	(Romania) Ceahlăul Piatra Neamţ
		Enache 38'

Aukštaitija Stadium, Panevėžys
Attendance: 2,000
Referee: Ihor Yarmenchuk (Ukraine)

Ceahlăul Piatra Neamţ won 2–0 on aggregate.

27 June 1999
18:00

Gomel (Belarus)	1–0 (a.e.t.)	(Czech Republic) Hradec Králové
Sysoyev 24'
Penalties
Sysoyev (penalty missed); Borel (penalty scored); Drozdov (penalty scored); Trosko (penalty scored)	3–1	(penalty missed) Záleský; (penalty scored) Havlíček; (penalty missed) Koubek; (penalty missed) Piták

Dinamo Stadium, Minsk
Attendance: 2,000
Referee: David Malcolm (Northern Ireland)

1–1 on aggregate, Gomel won 3–1 on penalties.

26 June 1999
16:00

Newry Town (Northern Ireland)	2–0	(Croatia) Hrvatski Dragovoljac
Casey 16'; Larkin 82'

The Showgrounds, Newry
Referee: Sergo Kvaratskhelia (Georgia)

Newry Town won 2–1 on aggregate.

26 June 1999
16:00

Qarabağ (Azerbaijan)	0–1	(Israel) Maccabi Haifa
		Benado 10'

Tofiq Bahramov Republican Stadium, Baku
Attendance: 10,000
Referee: İlhami Kaplan (Turkey)

2–2 on aggregate, Qarabağ won on away goals rule.

26 June 1999
16:00

Kolkheti-1913 Poti (Georgia (country))	0–4	(North Macedonia) Cementarnica 55
		Ristovski 22'; Gvasalia 32' (o.g.); Serafimovski 35'; Lazarevski 52'

Fazisi Stadium, Poti
Attendance: 2,400
Referee: Karel Vidlák (Czech Republic)

Cementarnica 55 won 8–2 on aggregate.

26 June 1999
17:00

Basel (Switzerland)	6–0	(Slovenia) Korotan Prevalje
Kreuzer 10' (pen.); Koumantarakis 18', 24', 43', 78'; Cantaluppi 58'	Summary

Stadion Schützenmatte, Basel
Attendance: 2,600
Referee: Costas Kapitanis (Cyprus)

Basel won 6–0 on aggregate.

26 June 1999
20:00

GÍ Gøta (Faroe Islands)	1–0	(Bosnia and Herzegovina) Jedinstvo Bihać
Eliasen 77'

Svangaskarð, Toftir
Attendance: 250
Referee: Egill Már Markússon (Iceland)

Jedinstvo Bihać won 3–1 on aggregate.

26 June 1999

Floriana (Malta)	2–1	(Wales) Aberystwyth Town
Buhagiar 17'; Oba 31'		Moore 38'

Hibernians Ground, Paola
Referee: Henri Diederich (Luxembourg)

Floriana won 4–3 on aggregate.

26 June 1999

Teuta (Albania)	2–1	(Iceland) ÍA
Begeja 59' (pen.), 90'		Hauksson 40'

Niko Dovana Stadium, Durrës
Attendance: 140
Referee: Charles Schaack (Luxembourg)

ÍA won 6–3 on aggregate.

26 June 1999

Narva Trans (Estonia)	1–4	(Finland) Jokerit
Lipartov 78'		Reynders 6', 51'; Lehtinen 32'; Koskela 42'

Kreenholm Stadium, Narva
Attendance: 200
Referee: Srečko Kandare (Slovenia)

Jokerit won 7–1 on aggregate.

== Second round ==
Team 1	Agg.	Team 2	1st leg	2nd leg
Perugia (Italy)	1–0	(North Macedonia) Pobeda	1–0	0–0
Duisburg (Germany)	2–1	(Northern Ireland) Newry Town	2–0	0–1
Basel (Switzerland)	4–2	(Czech Republic) Boby Brno	0–0	4–2
Cementarnica 55 (North Macedonia)	2–3	(Russia) Rostselmash	1–1	1–2
Brann (Norway)	3–3 (4–5 p)	(Croatia) Varteks	3–0	0–3
Rudar Velenje (Slovenia)	2–4	Austria Lustenau	1–2	1–2
Lokeren (Belgium)	6–2	(Iceland) ÍA	3–1	3–1
MŠK Žilina (Slovakia)	2–4	(France) Metz	2–1	0–3
Copenhagen (Denmark)	1–4	(Poland) Polonia Warsaw	0–3	1–1
Hammarby (Sweden)	6–2	(Belarus) Gomel	4–0	2–2
Ventspils (Latvia)	1–3	(Turkey) Kocaelispor	1–1	0–2
Qarabağ (Azerbaijan)	0–9	(France) Montpellier	0–3	0–6
Ararat Yerevan (Armenia)	1–5	(Belgium) Sint-Truiden	0–2	1–3
Neuchâtel Xamax (Switzerland)	0–3	(Hungary) Vasas	0–2	0–1
Jokerit (Finland)	3–2	(Malta) Floriana	2–1	1–1
Ceahlăul Piatra Neamţ (Romania)	5–2	(Bosnia and Herzegovina) Jedinstvo Bihać	2–1	3–1

=== First leg ===
3 July 1999

Perugia (Italy)	1–0	(North Macedonia) Pobeda
Rapaić 59'

Stadio Renato Curi, Perugia
Attendance: 10,000
Referee: Éric Poulat (France)

4 July 1999
18:00

Duisburg (Germany)	2–0	(Northern Ireland) Newry Town
Spies 49'; Beierle 74'	Report

Wedaustadion, Duisburg
Attendance: 12,000
Referee: Alan Freeland (Scotland)

4 July 1999
17:30

Basel (Switzerland)	0–0	(Czech Republic) Boby Brno
	Summary

Stadion Schützenmatte, Basel
Attendance: 2,600
Referee: Sorin Corpodean (Romania)

3 July 1999

Cementarnica 55 (North Macedonia)	1–1	(Russia) Rostselmash
Savov 6'		Matsigura 35'

Cementarnica Stadium, Skopje
Attendance: 3,000
Referee: Andreas Schluchter (Switzerland)

3 July 1999

Brann (Norway)	3–0	(Croatia) Varteks
Helland 2', 78'; Hanstveit 87'

Brann Stadion, Bergen
Attendance: 1,846
Referee: Anton Stredák (Slovakia)

4 July 1999

Rudar Velenje (Slovenia)	1–2	Austria Lustenau
Križanič 89'		Regtop 15', 38'

Ob Jezeru City Stadium, Velenje
Attendance: 1,200
Referee: Viorel Anghelinei (Romania)

3 July 1999

Lokeren (Belgium)	3–1	(Iceland) ÍA
Nikčević 40', 86'; Staelens 79'		Matijane 62'

Daknamstadion, Lokeren
Attendance: 1,234
Referee: Jon Skjervold (Norway)

3 July 1999

Žilina (Slovakia)	2–1	(France) Metz
Reiter 20'; Mintál 45'		Saha 68'

Štadión pod Dubňom, Žilina
Attendance: 2,665
Referee: Alan Snoddy (Northern Ireland)

4 July 1999

Copenhagen (Denmark)	0–3	(Poland) Polonia Warsaw
		Kaliszan 65'; Gołaszewski 72'; Boldt 80'

Gentofte Stadion, Gentofte
Attendance: 2,529
Referee: Frank De Bleeckere (Belgium)

4 July 1999
18:00

Hammarby (Sweden)	4–0	(Belarus) Gomel
Andersson 12'; Fursth 53'; Berggren 74', 75'

Söderstadion, Stockholm
Attendance: 5,035
Referee: Charles Agius (Malta)

3 July 1999

Ventspils (Latvia)	1–1	(Turkey) Kocaelispor
Vdovenko 50'		Dirlik 86'

Daugava Stadium, Riga
Attendance: 1,230
Referee: Andrey Butenko (Russia)

3 July 1999

Qarabağ (Azerbaijan)	0–3	(France) Montpellier
		Silvestre 20'; Delaye 35'; Maoulida 42'

Tofiq Bahramov Republican Stadium, Baku
Attendance: 6,000
Referee: Massimo Busacca (Switzerland)

3 July 1999

Ararat Yerevan (Armenia)	0–2	(Belgium) Sint-Truiden
		Fiers 17'; Dierickx 40'

Vazgen Sargsyan Republican Stadium, Yerevan
Attendance: 8,000
Referee: Cosimo Bolognino (Italy)

3 July 1999

Neuchâtel Xamax (Switzerland)	0–2	(Hungary) Vasas
		Aranyos 21'; Szilveszter 30'

Stade de la Maladière, Neuchâtel
Attendance: 750
Referee: Paulo Costa (Portugal)

4 July 1999

Jokerit (Finland)	2–1	(Malta) Floriana
Sumiala 35' (pen.); Hiukka 54'		Oba 69'

Kauniaisten Keskuskenttä, Kauniainen
Attendance: 627
Referee: Valeriy Onufer (Ukraine)

4 July 1999

Ceahlăul Piatra Neamţ (Romania)	2–1	(Bosnia and Herzegovina) Jedinstvo Bihać
Ionescu 48'; Grozavu 66'		Dujmović 34'

Stadionul Ceahlăul, Piatra Neamț
Attendance: 906
Referee: Emanuel Zammit (Malta)

=== Second leg ===
11 July 1999

Pobeda (North Macedonia)	0–0	(Italy) Perugia

Goce Delčev Stadium, Prilep
Attendance: 15,000
Referee: José João Mendes Pratas (Portugal)

Perugia won 1–0 on aggregate.

10 July 1999
16:00

Newry Town (Northern Ireland)	1–0	(Germany) Duisburg
Schneider 28' (o.g.)	Report

The Showgrounds, Newry
Attendance: 700
Referee: Sergey Gusev (Russia)

Duisburg won 2–1 on aggregate.

11 July 1999
18:00

Boby Brno (Czech Republic)	2–4	(Switzerland) Basel
Křivánek 19'; Zbončák 51'	Summary	Tholot 10' (pen.); Cantaluppi 37'; Savić 71'; Kehrli 89'

Stadion Za Lužánkami, Brno
Attendance: 2,600
Referee: Eduardo Iturralde González (Spain)

Basel won 4–2 on aggregate.

10 July 1999

Rostselmash (Russia)	2–1	(North Macedonia) Cementarnica 55
Dyadyuk 33'; Khankeyev 75'		Dimitrovski 66'

Rostselmash Stadium, Rostov-on-Don
Attendance: 12,500
Referee: Morgan Norman (Sweden)

Rostselmash won 3–2 on aggregate.

10 July 1999

Varteks (Croatia)	3–0 (a.e.t.)	(Norway) Brann
Mumlek 22'; Kamberović 24'; Madunović 82'
Penalties
Golubica (penalty scored); Posavec (penalty scored); Sklepić (penalty scored); Balajić (penalty scored); Mumlek (penalty scored)	5–4	(penalty scored) Mjelde; (penalty scored) Pedersen; (penalty scored) Hanstveit; (penalty scored) Helstad; (penalty missed) Samuelsson

Stadion Varteks, Varaždin
Attendance: 1,700
Referee: Roland Beck (Liechtenstein)

3–3 on aggregate; Varteks won 5–4 on penalties

10 July 1999

Austria Lustenau	2–1	(Slovenia) Rudar Velenje
Echteld 30'; Brezič 67'		Grobelšek 38'

Reichshofstadion, Lustenau
Attendance: 4,800
Referee: Romāns Lajuks (Latvia)

Austria Lustenau won 4–2 on aggregate.

11 July 1999

ÍA (Iceland)	1–3	(Belgium) Lokeren
Þórðarson 12'		Vonášek 4', 76'; Nikčević 69'

Akranesvöllur, Akranes
Referee: Mika Peltola (Finland)

Lokeren won 6–2 on aggregate.

11 July 1999

Metz (France)	3–0	(Slovakia) Žilina
Toyes 58'; Meyrieu 82' (pen.); Saha 83'

Stade Omnisports of Guentrange, Thionville
Attendance: 5,692
Referee: David Elleray (England)

Metz won 4–2 on aggregate.

10 July 1999

Polonia Warsaw (Poland)	1–1	(Denmark) Copenhagen
Dziewicki 18'		Lauridsen 56'

Stadion Polonii Warszawa, Warsaw
Attendance: 565
Referee: Mustafa Çulcu (Turkey)

Polonia Warsaw won 4–1 on aggregate.

11 July 1999
17:00

Gomel (Belarus)	2–2	(Sweden) Hammarby
Demenkovets 54'; Yusipets 84' (pen.)		Bakircioglu 41', 64'

Dinamo Stadium, Minsk
Attendance: 1,179
Referee: Zdravko Savić (FR Yugoslavia)

Hammarby won 6–2 on aggregate.

11 July 1999

Kocaelispor (Turkey)	2–0	(Latvia) Ventspils
Kaynak 6'; Dursun 50'

Bursa Atatürk Stadium, Bursa
Attendance: 1,250
Referee: Laurent Duhamel (France)

Kocaelispor won 3–1 on aggregate.

10 July 1999

Montpellier (France)	6–0	(Azerbaijan) Qarabağ
Mahouvé 11'; Džodić 16', 74'; Loko 66'; Guei 80'; Barbosa 87'

Stade de la Mosson, Montpellier
Referee: Mirosław Milewski (Poland)

Kocaelispor won 9–0 on aggregate.

10 July 1999

Sint-Truiden (Belgium)	3–1	(Armenia) Ararat Yerevan
Teppers 4' (pen.); Mertens 45'; Vrancken 57'		Mesropyan 64'

Stayen, Sint-Truiden
Attendance: 2,186
Referee: Ladislav Gádoši (Slovakia)

Sint-Truiden won 5–1 on aggregate.

10 July 1999

Vasas (Hungary)	1–0	(Switzerland) Neuchâtel Xamax
Sowunmi 31'

Stadion Rudolf Illovszky, Budapest
Attendance: 500
Referee: Johnny Ditlefsen (Norway)

Vasas won 3–0 on aggregate.

10 July 1999

Floriana (Malta)	1–1	(Finland) Jokerit
Burg 14'		Rantanen 75'

Victor Tedesco Stadium, Hamrun
Referee: Dragan Tripković (FR Yugoslavia)

Jokerit won 3–0 on aggregate.

10 July 1999

Jedinstvo Bihać (Bosnia and Herzegovina)	1–3	(Romania) Ceahlăul Piatra Neamţ
Hota 8'		Ilie 7'; Grozavu 23' (pen.); Botez 44'

Stadion pod Borićima, Bihać
Attendance: 7,500
Referee: Martin Ingvarsson (Sweden)

Ceahlăul Piatra Neamţ won 5–2 on aggregate.

== Third round ==
Team 1	Agg.	Team 2	1st leg	2nd leg
Espanyol (Spain)	1–4	(France) Montpellier	0–2	1–2
Ceahlăul Piatra Neamț (Romania)	1–1 (a)	(Italy) Juventus	1–1	0–0
Trabzonspor (Turkey)	4–2	(Italy) Perugia	1–2	3–0 (f)
Heerenveen (Netherlands)	4–0	(Sweden) Hammarby	2–0	2–0
West Ham United (England)	2–1	(Finland) Jokerit	1–0	1–1
Austria Lustenau	2–2 (a)	(France) Rennes	2–1	0–1
Hamburg (Germany)	3–3 (a)	(Switzerland) Basel	0–1	3–2
Sint-Truiden (Belgium)	2–3	Austria Wien	0–2	2–1
Varteks (Croatia)	2–2 (a)	(Russia) Rostselmash	1–2	1–0
Kocaelispor (Turkey)	0–3	(Germany) Duisburg	0–3	0–0
Lokeren (Belgium)	2–2 (a)	(France) Metz	1–2	1–0
Polonia Warsaw (Poland)	4–1	(Hungary) Vasas	2–0	2–1

=== First leg ===
17 July 1999

Espanyol (Spain)	0–2	(France) Montpellier
		Loko 32'; Džodić 84'

Estadi Olímpic de Montjuïc, Barcelona
Attendance: 8,300
Referee: Jan Wegereef (Netherlands)

18 July 1999

Ceahlăul Piatra Neamţ (Romania)	1–1	(Italy) Juventus
Scânteie 28'		Tacchinardi 58'

Stadionul Ceahlăul, Piatra Neamț
Attendance: 11,000
Referee: Dermot Gallagher (England)

17 July 1999

Trabzonspor (Turkey)	1–2	(Italy) Perugia
Vugrinec 54'		Olive 4'; Nakata 54' (pen.)

Hüseyin Avni Aker Stadium, Trabzon
Attendance: 14,600
Referee: Dieter Schoch (Switzerland)

17 July 1999

West Ham United (England)	1–0	(Finland) Jokerit
Kitson 18'

Boleyn Ground, London
Attendance: 11,098
Referee: Miroslav Liba (Czech Republic)

17 July 1999

Heerenveen (Netherlands)	2–0	(Sweden) Hammarby
Samardžić 11' (pen.); Pahlplatz 76'

Abe Lenstra, Heerenveen
Attendance: 12,200
Referee: Fritz Stuchlik (Austria)

17 July 1999

Austria Lustenau	2–1	(France) Rennes
Marcelino 30'; Schneidhofer 90'		Diouf 52'

Reichshofstadion, Lustenau
Attendance: 5,500
Referee: Pasquale Rodomonti (Italy)

17 July 1999
18:00

Hamburg (Germany)	0–1	(Switzerland) Basel
	Summary	Koumantarakis 15'

Lohmühle, Lübeck
Attendance: 8,192
Referee: Miroslav Radoman (FR Yugoslavia)

17 July 1999

Sint-Truiden (Belgium)	0–2	Austria Wien
		Mayrleb 9' (pen.), 66'

Stayen, Sint-Truiden
Attendance: 4,000
Referee: John Ferry (Northern Ireland)

17 July 1999

Varteks (Croatia)	1–2	(Russia) Rostselmash
Mumlek 7' (pen.)		Bakhtin 40'; Malygin 90'

Stadion Varteks, Varaždin
Attendance: 3,000
Referee: Mike Riley (England)

17 July 1999
19:30

Kocaelispor (Turkey)	0–3	(Germany) Duisburg
	Report	Wedau 14'; Tøfting 50'; Osthoff 53'

Bursa Atatürk Stadium, Bursa
Attendance: 2,562
Referee: Juan Fernández Marín (Spain)

17 July 1999

Lokeren (Belgium)	1–2	(France) Metz
Janssens 48' (pen.)		Saha 46', 84'

Daknamstadion, Lokeren
Attendance: 3,544
Referee: Giorgos Bikas (Greece)

17 July 1999

Polonia Warsaw (Poland)	2–0	(Hungary) Vasas
Moskal 15'; Bartczak 70'

Stadion Polonii Warszawa, Warsaw
Attendance: 700
Referee: Dani Koren (Israel)

=== Second leg ===
24 July 1999

Montpellier (France)	2–1	(Spain) Espanyol
Delaye 36'; Džodić 54'		Pérez 73'

Stade de la Mosson, Montpellier
Attendance: 9,851
Referee: Lutz-Michael Fröhlich (Germany)

Montpellier won 4–1 on aggregate.

24 July 1999

Juventus (Italy)	0–0	(Romania) Ceahlăul Piatra Neamţ

Stadio Dino Manuzzi, Cesena
Attendance: 15,000
Referee: Roy Helge Olsen (Norway)

1–1 on aggregate, Juventus won on away goals rule.

24 July 1999

Perugia (Italy)	1–3 (a.e.t.)	(Turkey) Trabzonspor
Petrachi 5'		Vugrinec 22'; Selahattin 88'; Hami 113'

Stadio Renato Curi, Perugia
Attendance: 10,000
Referee: Georg Dardenne (Germany)

The game was abandoned in the 114th minute of extra time due to some objects being thrown on the pitch, some even hitting the referee. UEFA banned Perugia and awarded a 3–0 win to Trabzonspor.

Trabzonspor won 4–2 on aggregate.

24 July 1999

Jokerit (Finland)	1–1	(England) West Ham United
Koskela 33'	[[[Category:All articles with unsourced statements]] Report]	Lampard 70'

Olympiastadion, Helsinki
Attendance: 7,667
Referee: Valentin Ivanov (Russia)

West Ham United won 2–1 on aggregate.

24 July 1999

Hammarby (Sweden)	0–2	(Netherlands) Heerenveen
		Samardžić 14', 60'

Söderstadion, Stockholm
Attendance: 6,389
Referee: Víctor Esquinas Torres (Spain)

Heerenveen won 4–0 on aggregate.

24 July 1999

Rennes (France)	1–0	Austria Lustenau
Bigné 25'

Stade de la Route de Lorient, Rennes
Attendance: 8,928
Referee: Fernand Meese (Belgium)

2–2 on aggregate, Rennes won on away goals rule.

24 July 1999
16:45

Basel (Switzerland)	2–3	(Germany) Hamburg
Koumantarakis 50', 57'	Summary	Fischer 37'; Groth 44'; Yeboah 48'

Stadion Schützenmatte, Basel
Attendance: 3,756
Referee: René Temmink (Netherlands)

3–3 on aggregate, Hamburg won on away goals rule.

24 July 1999

Austria Wien	1–2	(Belgium) Sint-Truiden
Stöger 63'		Teppers 33' (pen.); Fiers 45'

Franz Horr Stadium, Vienna
Attendance: 3,000
Referee: Jorge Coroado (Portugal)

Austria Wien won 3–2 on aggregate.

24 July 1999

Rostselmash (Russia)	0–1	(Croatia) Varteks
		Mumlek 73'

Rostselmash Stadium, Rostov-on-Don
Attendance: 13,000
Referee: John Rowbotham (Scotland)

2–2 on aggregate, Rostselmash won on away goals rule.

24 July 1999
18:00

Duisburg (Germany)	0–0	(Turkey) Kocaelispor
	Report

Wedaustadion, Duisburg
Attendance: 9,200
Referee: Domenico Messina (Italy)

Duisburg won 3–0 on aggregate.

24 July 1999

Metz (France)	0–1	(Belgium) Lokeren
		Kimoto 40'

Stade Saint-Symphorien, Metz
Attendance: 9,976
Referee: Roelof Luinge (Netherlands)

2–2 on aggregate, Metz won on away goals rule.

24 July 1999

Vasas (Hungary)	1–2	(Poland) Polonia Warsaw
Aranyos 87'		Bąk 61'; Gołaszewski 80'

Stadion Rudolf Illovszky, Budapest
Attendance: 1,310
Referee: Herbert Fandel (Germany)

Polonia Warsaw won 4–1 on aggregate.

== Semi-finals ==
Team 1	Agg.	Team 2	1st leg	2nd leg
Duisburg (Germany)	1–4	(France) Montpellier	1–1	0–3
Trabzonspor (Turkey)	3–6	(Germany) Hamburg	2–2	1–4
Rostselmash (Russia)	1–9	(Italy) Juventus	0–4	1–5
Rennes (France)	4–2	Austria Wien	2–0	2–2
West Ham United (England)	2–0	(Netherlands) Heerenveen	1–0	1–0
Metz (France)	6–2	(Poland) Polonia Warsaw	5–1	1–1

=== First leg ===
28 July 1999
20:00

Duisburg (Germany)	1–1	(France) Montpellier
Osthoff 25'		Maoulida 39'

Wedaustadion, Duisburg
Attendance: 10,520
Referee: Željko Širić (Croatia)

28 July 1999
20:00

Trabzonspor (Turkey)	2–2	(Germany) Hamburg
Mandıralı 68', 73'		Yeboah 58'; Hollerbach 61'

Hüseyin Avni Aker Stadium, Trabzon
Attendance: 30,000
Referee: Knud Erik Fisker (Denmark)

28 July 1999
18:30 MSK

Rostselmash (Russia)	0–4	(Italy) Juventus
		Zambrotta 8'; Inzaghi 66', 88' (pen.); Kovačević 68'

Rostselmash Stadium, Rostov-on-Don
Attendance: 17,000
Referee: Arturo Dauden Ibáñez (Spain)

28 July 1999
20:00

Rennes (France)	2–0	Austria Wien
Bassila 52'; Yapi 84'

Stade de la Route de Lorient, Rennes
Attendance: 10,460
Referee: Jacek Granat (Poland)

28 July 1999
19:45 BST

West Ham United (England)	1–0	(Netherlands) Heerenveen
Lampard 7'	[[[Category:All articles with unsourced statements]] Report]

Boleyn Ground, London
Attendance: 7,485
Referee: Edgar Steinborn (Germany)

28 July 1999
20:00

Metz (France)	5–1	(Poland) Polonia Warsaw
Meyrieu 52'; Saha 32', 63'; Goussé 45'; Jestrović 90+'		Olisadebe 85'

Stade Saint-Symphorien, Metz
Attendance: 10,000
Referee: Alfredo Trentalange (Italy)

=== Second leg ===
4 August 1999
20:00

Montpellier (France)	3–0	(Germany) Duisburg
Sorlin 29'; Delaye 70'; Loko 80' (pen.)

Stade de la Mosson, Montpellier
Attendance: 11,050
Referee: Leslie Irvine (Northern Ireland)

Montpellier won 3–1 on aggregate.

4 August 1999
18:30

Hamburg (Germany)	4–1	(Turkey) Trabzonspor
Mahdavikia 37' 57'; Präger 64'; Hashemian 82'		Mandıralı 69'

Lohmühle, Lübeck
Attendance: 9,459
Referee: Graham Barber (England)

Hamburger SV won 6–3 on aggregate.

4 August 1999
20:45 CET

Juventus (Italy)	5–1	(Russia) Rostselmash
Inzaghi 33' (pen.), 64', 69'; Tacchinardi 48'; Del Piero 75'		Duyun 38'

Stadio Dino Manuzzi, Cesena
Attendance: 17,000
Referee: Eric Romain (Belgium)

Juventus won 9–1 on aggregate.

4 August 1999
19:30

Austria Wien	2–2	(France) Rennes
Mayrleb 25', 40'		Le Roux 87'; Nonda 90'

Franz Horr Stadium, Vienna
Attendance: 3,000
Referee: William Young (Scotland)

Rennes won 4–2 on aggregate.

4 August 1999

Heerenveen (Netherlands)	0–1	(England) West Ham United
	[[[Category:All articles with unsourced statements]] Report]	Wanchope 25'

Abe Lenstra, Heerenveen
Attendance: 13,500
Referee: Pascal Garibian (France)

West Ham United won 2–0 on aggregate.

4 August 1999
16:30

Polonia Warsaw (Poland)	1–1	(France) Metz
Dziewicki 56'		Saha 89'

Stadion Polonii Warszawa, Warsaw
Attendance: 2,000
Referee: Leif Sundell (Sweden)

Metz won 6–2 on aggregate.

== Finals ==
Team 1	Agg.	Team 2	1st leg	2nd leg
Juventus (Italy)	4–2	(France) Rennes	2–0	2–2
West Ham United (England)	3–2	(France) Metz	0–1	3–1
Montpellier (France)	2–2 (3–0 p)	(Germany) Hamburg	1–1	1–1

=== First leg ===
10 August 1999
19:00

Montpellier (France)	1–1	(Germany) Hamburg
Loko 14' (pen.)	Report	Panadić 81'

Stade de la Mosson, Montpellier
Attendance: 11,576
Referee: Dick Jol (Netherlands)

10 August 1999
20:45

Juventus (Italy)	2–0	(France) Rennes
Inzaghi 31', 63'	Report

Stadio Dino Manuzzi, Cesena
Attendance: 23,609
Referee: Rune Pedersen (Norway)

10 August 1999
20:45

West Ham United (England)	0–1	(France) Metz
	Report	Saha 12'

Boleyn Ground, London
Attendance: 25,372
Referee: Manuel Díaz Vega (Spain)

=== Second leg ===
24 August 1999
18:00

Hamburg (Germany)	1–1	(France) Montpellier
Yeboah 22'	Report	Sorlin 70'
Penalties
Panadić (penalty missed); Groth (penalty missed); Babatz (penalty missed)	0–3	(penalty scored) Silvestre; (penalty scored) Serredszum; (penalty missed) Mahouvé; (penalty scored) Fugier

Volksparkstadion, Hamburg
Attendance: 52,000
Referee: Ľuboš Micheľ (Slovakia)

2–2 on aggregate; Montpellier won 3–0 on penalties

24 August 1999
20:00

Metz (France)	1–3	(England) West Ham United
Jestrović 68'	Report	Sinclair 23'; Lampard 44'; Wanchope 79'

Stade Saint-Symphorien, Metz
Attendance: 19,599
Referee: Hellmut Krug (Germany)

West Ham United won 3–2 on aggregate.

24 August 1999
20:45

Rennes (France)	2–2	(Italy) Juventus
Diouf 19'; Nonda 89'	Report	Conte 29'; Zambrotta 73'

Stade de la Route de Lorient, Rennes
Attendance: 11,427
Referee: Vítor Melo Pereira (Portugal)

Juventus won 4–2 on aggregate.

== See also ==
- 1999–2000 UEFA Champions League
- 1999–2000 UEFA Cup
