= FC Rostov in European football =

Overview of FC Rostov's role in European football

Rostov in European football
- Club: Rostov
- First entry: 1999 UEFA Intertoto Cup
- Latest entry: 2020–21 UEFA Europa League

Rostov is a Russian football club based in Rostov-on-Don, Russia.

== History ==
In 2022, the European Club Association suspended Rostov, citing the Russian invasion of Ukraine.

=== Matches ===
Season	Competition	Round	Opponent	Home	Away	Aggregate
1999	UEFA Intertoto Cup	2R	(North Macedonia) FK Cementarnica 55	2–1	1–1	3–2
1999	UEFA Intertoto Cup	3R	(Croatia) NK Varteks	0–1	2–1	2–2 (a)
1999	UEFA Intertoto Cup	SF	(Italy) Juventus	0–4	1–5	1–9
2000	UEFA Intertoto Cup	3R	(France) AJ Auxerre	0–2	1–3	1–5
2014–15	UEFA Europa League	PO	(Turkey) Trabzonspor	0–2	0–0	0–2
2016–17	UEFA Champions League	3R	(Belgium) Anderlecht	2–2	2–0	4–2
2016–17	UEFA Champions League	PO	(Netherlands) Ajax	4–1	1–1	5–2
2016–17	UEFA Champions League	Group D	(Germany) Bayern Munich	3–2	0–5	3rd place
2016–17	UEFA Champions League	Group D	(Spain) Atlético Madrid	0–1	1–2	3rd place
2016–17	UEFA Champions League	Group D	(Netherlands) PSV Eindhoven	2–2	0–0	3rd place
2016–17	UEFA Europa League	R32	(Czech Republic) Sparta Prague	4–0	1–1	5–1
2016–17	UEFA Europa League	R16	(England) Manchester United	1–1	0–1	1–2
2020–21	UEFA Europa League	3Q	(Israel) Maccabi Haifa	1–2	—	1–2

== Player statistics ==
=== Appearances ===
As of match played 24 September 2020

	Name	Years	UEFA Intertoto Cup	UEFA Europa League	UEFA Champions League	Total	Ratio
1	(Russia) Dmitri Poloz	2012-2017, 2020-2023	(-)	7 (2)	10 (5)	17 (7)	0.41
2	(Moldova) Alexandru Gațcan	2008-2019	(-)	5 (0)	10 (0)	15 (0)	0
3	(Belarus) Timofey Kalachyov	2006-2007, 2010-2019	(-)	5 (0)	9 (0)	14 (0)	0
3	(Iran) Sardar Azmoun	2015-2016, 2016-2017	(-)	4 (1)	10 (4)	14 (5)	0.36
3	(Ecuador) Christian Noboa	2015-2017	(-)	4 (1)	10 (4)	14 (5)	0.36
3	(Spain) César Navas	2015-2017	(-)	4 (0)	10 (0)	14 (0)	0
7	(Russia) Aleksandr Yerokhin	2016-2017	(-)	4 (0)	9 (1)	13 (1)	0.08
8	(Russia) Denis Terentyev	2015-2017, 2020-2024	(-)	3 (0)	9 (0)	12 (0)	0
8	(Russia) Fyodor Kudryashov	2016-2017	(-)	4 (0)	8 (0)	12 (0)	0
10	(Russia) Aleksandr Bukharov	2014-2018	(-)	6 (1)	5 (0)	11 (1)	0.09
11	(Russia) Soslan Dzhanayev	2014-2017	(-)	0 (0)	10 (0)	10 (0)	0
11	(Slovenia) Miha Mevlja	2016-2017, 2019	(-)	4 (1)	6 (0)	10 (1)	0.1
13	(Russia) Vladimir Granat	2015, 2016-2017	(-)	3 (0)	6 (0)	9 (0)	0
14	(Russia) Dmitri Kirichenko	1998-2001, 2011-2013	8 (1)	(-)	(-)	8 (1)	0.13
15	(Mali) Moussa Doumbia (Note: Doumbia was born in the Ivory Coast, but went on to play for Mali at international level.)	2014-2018	(-)	2 (0)	5 (0)	7 (0)	0
15	(Romania) Andrei Prepeliță	2016-2017	(-)	3 (0)	4 (0)	7 (0)	0
17	(Ukraine) Vladislav Duyun	1997-1999	6 (1)	(-)	(-)	6 (1)	0.17
17	(Russia) Mikhail Kupriyanov	1998-2001	6 (0)	(-)	(-)	6 (0)	0
17	(Iran) Saeid Ezatolahi	2015-2020	(-)	0 (0)	6 (1)	6 (1)	0.17
20	(Ukraine) Ihor Kutyepov	1998-1999	5 (0)	(-)	(-)	5 (0)	0
20	(Russia) Yuri Dyadyuk	1992-1999	5 (1)	(-)	(-)	5 (1)	0.2
20	(Russia) Gennadi Styopushkin	1981-1982, 1985–1987; 1990–1993, 1999-2000	5 (0)	(-)	(-)	5 (0)	0
20	(Ukraine) Anatoliy Bezsmertnyi	1998-2001	5 (0)	(-)	(-)	5 (0)	0
20	(Russia) Igor Khankeyev	1997-2000	5 (1)	(-)	(-)	5 (1)	0.2
20	(Russia) Aslan Datdeyev	1999	4 (0)	(-)	(-)	4 (0)	0
20	(Ukraine) Volodymyr Matsyhura	1996-2000	4 (1)	(-)	(-)	4 (1)	0.25
20	(Russia) Aleksei Guschin	1994, 1997–2000; 2002, 2004	4 (0)	(-)	(-)	4 (0)	0
20	(Ukraine) Oleh Pestryakov	1998-1999	4 (0)	(-)	(-)	4 (0)	0
20	(Russia) Yuri Matveyev	1998-2000	4 (0)	(-)	(-)	4 (0)	0
20	(Russia) Anton Rogochiy	1998-2008	4 (0)	(-)	(-)	4 (0)	0
20	(Russia) Sergei Kolotovkin	1998-2000	4 (0)	(-)	(-)	4 (0)	0
20	(Russia) Yuri Borovskoy	1991-1996, 1999-2001	4 (0)	(-)	(-)	4 (0)	0
20	(Angola) Bastos	2013-2016	(-)	2 (0)	2 (0)	4 (0)	0
20	(Russia) Ivan Novoseltsev	2014-2016, 2019	(-)	0 (0)	4 (0)	4 (0)	0
20	(Russia) Nikita Medvedev	2016-2017, 2022-2024	(-)	4 (0)	0 (0)	4 (0)	0
36	(Russia) Vladimir Komarov	1998-1999	3 (0)	(-)	(-)	3 (0)	0
36	(Russia) Maksim Grigoryev	2011, 2014–2015; 2016-2017	(-)	2 (0)	1 (0)	3 (0)	0
36	(Russia) Igor Kireyev	2012-2018	(-)	1 (0)	2 (0)	3 (0)	0
36	(Russia) Khoren Bayramyan (Note: Bayramyan was born in the Armenia, but prior to 2020 when he made his international debut for Armenia, he had played for Russia at youth level.)	2013-2016	(-)	2 (0)	1 (0)	3 (0)	0
40	(Russia) Sergey Maslov	1997-2000	2 (0)	(-)	(-)	2 (0)	0
40	(Russia) Igor Bakhtin	1999	2 (1)	(-)	(-)	2 (1)	0.5
40	(Ukraine) Bohdan Yesyp	1999	2 (0)	(-)	(-)	2 (0)	0
40	(Russia) Oleg Sanko	1991-1995, 1998-1999	2 (0)	(-)	(-)	2 (0)	0
40	(Ukraine) Valentyn Slyusar	1999	2 (0)	(-)	(-)	2 (0)	0
40	(Ukraine) Vladyslav Prudius	1996-2001	2 (0)	(-)	(-)	2 (0)	0
40	(Ukraine) Volodymyr Savchenko	1997-2003	2 (0)	(-)	(-)	2 (0)	0
40	(Russia) Dmitri Ivanov	2000	2 (0)	(-)	(-)	2 (0)	0
40	(Uzbekistan) Andrey Akopyants	2000-2005	2 (0)	(-)	(-)	2 (0)	0
40	(Uzbekistan) Nikolay Shirshov	2000-2005	2 (0)	(-)	(-)	2 (0)	0
40	(Croatia) Stipe Pletikosa	2011-2015	(-)	2 (0)	(-)	2 (0)	0
40	(Russia) Dmitri Torbinski	2014-2015	(-)	2 (0)	(-)	2 (0)	0
40	(Russia) Vitali Dyakov	2012-2015	(-)	2 (0)	(-)	2 (0)	0
40	(Gabon) Guélor Kanga	2013-2016	(-)	2 (0)	(-)	2 (0)	0
40	(Croatia) Hrvoje Milić	2013-2015	(-)	2 (0)	(-)	2 (0)	0
40	(Haiti) Réginal Goreux	2014-2015	(-)	2 (0)	(-)	2 (0)	0
40	(Ukraine) Marko Dević (Note: Dević was born in the Socialist Republic of Serbia, but went on to play for Ukraine at international level.)	2017	(-)	2 (0)	(-)	2 (0)	0
57	(Russia) Sergei Nechay (Note: Nechay was born in the Ukrainian Soviet Socialist Republic.)	1995-1999	1 (0)	(-)	(-)	1 (0)	0
57	(Russia) Yevgeni Landyrev	1998-1999	1 (0)	(-)	(-)	1 (0)	0
57	(Russia) Andrei Cherenkov	1997-1999	1 (0)	(-)	(-)	1 (0)	0
57	(Ukraine) Aleksandr Malygin	1999-2002	1 (1)	(-)	(-)	1 (1)	1
57	(Kazakhstan) Samat Smakov	2000-2001	1 (0)	(-)	(-)	1 (0)	0
57	(Uzbekistan) Sergey Lushan	2000-2002	1 (0)	(-)	(-)	1 (0)	0
57	(Lithuania) Artūras Fomenka	2000-2002	1 (0)	(-)	(-)	1 (0)	0
57	(Lithuania) Tadas Gražiūnas	2000-2001	1 (0)	(-)	(-)	1 (0)	0
57	(Russia) David Khmelidze	2000-2003	1 (0)	(-)	(-)	1 (0)	0
57	(South Korea) Yoo Byung-soo	2013-2016	(-)	1 (0)	(-)	1 (0)	0
57	(Bosnia and Herzegovina) Dennis Hadžikadunić (Note: Hadžikadunić was born in the Sweden, but went on to play for Bosnia and Herzegovina at international level.)	2018–Present	(-)	1 (0)	(-)	1 (0)	0
57	(Russia) Aleksei Kozlov	2019-2021	(-)	1 (0)	(-)	1 (0)	0
57	(Russia) Maksim Osipenko	2020–Present	(-)	1 (0)	(-)	1 (0)	0
57	(Russia) Yevgeni Chernov	2019-2020, 2023, 2023–Present	(-)	1 (0)	(-)	1 (0)	0
57	(North Macedonia) David Toshevski	2020-2023	(-)	1 (0)	(-)	1 (0)	0
57	(Uzbekistan) Eldor Shomurodov	2017-2020	(-)	1 (1)	(-)	1 (1)	1
57	(Russia) Sergei Pesyakov	2012, 2017-2024	(-)	1 (0)	(-)	1 (0)	0
57	(Japan) Kento Hashimoto	2020-2023	(-)	1 (0)	(-)	1 (0)	0
57	(Russia) Danil Glebov	2019–Present	(-)	1 (0)	(-)	1 (0)	0
57	(Norway) Mathias Normann	2019-2023	(-)	1 (0)	(-)	1 (0)	0
57	(Finland) Roman Eremenko (Note: Eremenko was born in the Russia, but went on to play for Finland at international level.)	2019-2021	(-)	1 (0)	(-)	1 (0)	0
57	(Russia) Aleksei Ionov	2017-2020, 2023	(-)	1 (0)	(-)	1 (0)	0

=== Goalscorers ===
As of match played 24 September 2020

	Name	Years	UEFA Intertoto Cup	UEFA Europa League	UEFA Champions League	Total	Ratio
1	(Russia) Dmitri Poloz	2012-2017, 2020-2023	(-)	2 (7)	5 (10)	7 (17)	0.41
2	(Iran) Sardar Azmoun	2015-2016, 2016-2017	(-)	1 (4)	4 (10)	5 (14)	0.36
2	(Ecuador) Christian Noboa	2015-2017	(-)	1 (4)	4 (10)	5 (14)	0.36
4	(Ukraine) Volodymyr Matsyhura	1996-2000	1 (4)	(-)	(-)	1 (4)	0.25
4	(Russia) Yuri Dyadyuk	1992-1999	1 (5)	(-)	(-)	1 (5)	0.2
4	(Russia) Igor Khankeyev	1997-2000	1 (5)	(-)	(-)	1 (5)	0.2
4	(Russia) Igor Bakhtin	1996-2000	1 (2)	(-)	(-)	1 (2)	0.5
4	(Ukraine) Aleksandr Malygin	1999-2002	1 (1)	(-)	(-)	1 (1)	1
4	(Ukraine) Vladislav Duyun	1998-2001	1 (6)	(-)	(-)	1 (6)	0.17
4	(Russia) Dmitri Kirichenko	1998-2001, 2011-2013	1 (8)	(-)	(-)	1 (8)	0.13
4	(Russia) Aleksandr Bukharov	2014-2018	(-)	1 (6)	0 (5)	1 (11)	0.09
4	(Slovenia) Miha Mevlja	2016-2017, 2019	(-)	1 (4)	0 (6)	1 (10)	0.1
4	(Russia) Aleksandr Yerokhin	2016-2017	(-)	0 (4)	1 (9)	1 (13)	0.08
4	(Iran) Saeid Ezatolahi	2015-2020	(-)	(-)	1 (6)	1 (6)	0.17
4	(Uzbekistan) Eldor Shomurodov	2017-2020	(-)	1 (1)	(-)	1 (1)	1

=== Clean sheets ===
As of match played 24 September 2020

	Name	Years	UEFA Intertoto Cup	UEFA Europa League	UEFA Champions League	Total	Ratio
1	(Russia) Soslan Dzhanayev	2014-2017	(-)	0 (0)	2 (10)	2 (10)	0.2
2	(Croatia) Stipe Pletikosa	2011-2015	(-)	1 (2)	(-)	1 (2)	0.5
2	(Russia) Nikita Medvedev	2016-2017, 2022-2024	(-)	1 (4)	0 (0)	1 (4)	0.25
4	(Ukraine) Ihor Kutyepov	1998-1999	0 (5)	(-)	(-)	0 (5)	0
4	(Russia) David Khmelidze	2000-2003	0 (1)	(-)	(-)	0 (1)	0
4	(Ukraine) Volodymyr Savchenko	1997-2003	0 (2)	(-)	(-)	0 (2)	0
4	(Russia) Sergei Pesyakov	2012, 2017-2024	(-)	0 (1)	(-)	0 (1)	0

== Overall record ==
=== By competition ===
As of match played 24 September 2020

Competition	Pld	W	D	L	GF	GA
UEFA Intertoto Cup	8	2	1	5	7	18
UEFA Europa League	7	1	3	3	7	7
UEFA Champions League	10	3	4	3	15	16
Total	25	6	8	11	29	41

=== By country ===
As of match played 24 September 2020

Country	Played	Win	Draw	Lost	Goals For	Goals Against	Goal Difference	Win%
Belgium	2	1	1	0	4	2	+2	50.00
Croatia	2	1	0	1	2	2	+0	50.00
Czechia	2	1	1	0	5	1	+4	50.00
England	2	0	1	1	1	2	−1	0.00
France	2	0	0	2	1	5	−4	0.00
Germany	2	1	0	1	3	7	−4	50.00
Israel	1	0	0	1	1	2	−1	0.00
Italy	2	0	0	2	1	9	−8	0.00
Netherlands	4	1	3	0	7	4	+3	25.00
North Macedonia	2	1	1	0	3	2	+1	50.00
Spain	2	0	0	2	1	3	−2	0.00
Turkey	2	0	1	1	0	2	−2	0.00

=== By club ===
As of match played 24 September 2020

Opponent	Played	Won	Drawn	Lost	Goals For	Goals Against	Goal Difference	Win%
(Belgium) Anderlecht	2	1	1	0	4	2	+2	50.00
(Croatia) NK Varaždin	2	1	0	1	2	2	+0	50.00
(Czech Republic) Sparta Prague	2	1	1	0	5	1	+4	50.00
(England) Manchester United	2	0	1	1	1	2	−1	0.00
(France) AJ Auxerre	2	0	0	2	1	5	−4	0.00
(Germany) Bayern Munich	2	1	0	1	3	7	−4	50.00
(Israel) Maccabi Haifa	1	0	0	1	1	2	−1	0.00
(Italy) Juventus	2	0	0	2	1	9	−8	0.00
(Netherlands) Ajax	2	1	1	0	5	2	+3	50.00
(Netherlands) PSV Eindhoven	2	0	2	0	2	2	+0	0.00
(North Macedonia) Cementarnica 55	2	1	1	0	3	2	+1	50.00
(Spain) Atlético Madrid	2	0	0	2	1	3	−2	0.00
(Turkey) Trabzonspor	2	0	1	1	0	2	−2	0.00
