= 1999–2000 Montpellier HSC season =

Montpellier HSC
1999–2000 season
- President: Louis Nicollin
- Head coach: Michel Mézy
- Stadium: Stade de la Mosson
- French Division 1: 18th (relegated)
- Coupe de France: Round of 64
- Coupe de la Ligue: Round of 16
- UEFA Cup: Second round
- UEFA Intertoto Cup: Winners
- Top goalscorer: League: Patrice Loko (8); All: Patrice Loko (14)
- Biggest win: Montpellier 3–0 Nantes
- Biggest defeat: Nantes 3–0 Montpellier; Paris Saint-Germain 3–0 Montpellier

The 1999–2000 season was Montpellier Hérault Sport Club's 81st season in existence and the club's 13th consecutive season in the top flight of French football. In addition to the domestic league, Montpellier participated in this season's edition of the Coupe de France. The season covered the period from 1 July 1999 to 30 June 2000.

== Competitions ==
=== Overview ===
Competition	First match	Last match	Starting round	Final position	Record							
Competition	First match	Last match	Starting round	Final position	Pld	W	D	L	GF	GA	GD	Win %
French Division 1	31 July 1999	13 May 2000	Matchday 1	18th	34	7	10	17	39	50	−11	20.59
Coupe de France	21 January 2000		Round of 64	Round of 64	1	0	0	1	1	2	−1	0.00
Coupe de France	9 January 2000	30 January 2000	Round of 32	Round of 16	2	1	0	1	3	2	+1	50.00
UEFA Cup	14 September 1999	4 November 1999	First round	Second round	4	1	1	2	4	7	−3	25.00
Intertoto Cup	3 July 1999	24 August 1999	Second round	Winners	8	5	3	0	19	5	+14	62.50
Total					49	14	14	21	66	66	+0	28.57

Source: Competitions

=== French Division 1 ===
==== League table ====
Pos	Team	Pld	W	D	L	GF	GA	GD	Pts	Qualification or relegation
14	Troyes	34	13	4	17	36	52	−16	43	
15	Marseille	34	9	15	10	45	45	0	42	
16	Nancy (R)	34	11	9	14	43	45	−2	42	Relegation to French Division 2
17	Le Havre (R)	34	9	7	18	30	52	−22	34	Relegation to French Division 2
18	Montpellier (R)	34	7	10	17	39	50	−11	31	Relegation to French Division 2

Source: Ligue 1
Rules for classification: 1) points; 2) goal difference; 3) number of goals scored.
(R) Relegated

==== Results summary ====
Overall								Home						Away					
Pld	W	D	L	GF	GA	GD	Pts	W	D	L	GF	GA	GD	W	D	L	GF	GA	GD
34	7	10	17	39	50	−11	31	4	8	5	22	19	+3	3	2	12	17	31	−14

==== Results by round ====
Round	1	2	3	4	5	6	7	8	9	10	11	12	13	14	15	16	17	18	19	20	21	22	23	24	25	26	27	28	29	30	31	32	33	34
Ground	A	H	A	H	A	H	A	H	A	H	A	H	A	A	H	A	H	A	H	A	H	A	H	A	H	A	H	A	H	H	A	H	A	H
Result	W	D	L	L	L	W	W	D	L	L	L	D	L	L	L	D	L	L	D	L	W	D	W	L	D	L	D	L	W	D	W	L	L	D
Position	3	6	11	14	17	13	9	10	11	16	16	16	16	18	18	18	18	18	18	18	18	18	18	18	18	18	18	18	18	18	18	18	18	18

A = Away; H = Home; W = Win; D = Draw; L = Loss

==== Matches ====
31 July 1999 1	Lyon	1–2	Montpellier	Lyon
20:00 CEST (UTC+2)				Stadium: Stade de Gerland

7 August 1999 2	Montpellier	2–2	Bordeaux	Montpellier
20:00 CEST (UTC+2)				Stadium: Stade de la Mosson

14 August 1999 3	Strasbourg	2–0	Montpellier	Strasbourg
20:00 CEST (UTC+2)				Stadium: Stade de la Meinau

20 August 1999 4	Montpellier	2–3	Monaco	Montpellier
20:00 CEST (UTC+2)				Stadium: Stade de la Mosson

28 August 1999 5	Nantes	3–0	Montpellier	Nantes
20:00 CEST (UTC+2)				Stadium: Stade de la Beaujoire

11 September 1999 6	Montpellier	3–1	Marseille	Montpellier
20:00 CEST (UTC+2)				Stadium: Stade de la Mosson

19 September 1999 7	Nancy	1–2	Montpellier	Tomblaine
18:00 CEST (UTC+2)				Stadium: Stade Marcel Picot

25 September 1999 8	Montpellier	1–1	Sedan	Montpellier
20:00 CEST (UTC+2)				Stadium: Stade de la Mosson

2 October 1999 9	Le Havre	2–1	Montpellier	Le Havre
20:00 CEST (UTC+2)				Stadium: Stade Jules Deschaseaux

13 October 1999 10	Montpellier	0–1	Saint-Étienne	Montpellier
20:00 CEST (UTC+2)				Stadium: Stade de la Mosson

16 October 1999 11	Lens	1–0	Montpellier	Lens
20:00 CEST (UTC+2)				Stadium: Stade Bollaert-Delelis

24 October 1999 12	Montpellier	1–1	Bastia	Montpellier
18:00 CEST (UTC+2)				Stadium: Stade de la Mosson

30 October 1999 13	Auxerre	2–1	Montpellier	Auxerre
20:00 CEST (UTC+2)				Stadium: Stade de l'Abbé-Deschamps

7 November 1999 14	Troyes	2–1	Montpellier	Troyes
17:00 CET (UTC+1)				Stadium: Stade de l'Abbé-Deschamps

10 November 1999 15	Montpellier	1–2	Rennes	Montpellier
19:00 CET (UTC+1)				Stadium: Stade de la Mosson

19 November 1999 16	Metz	2–2	Montpellier	Metz
20:00 CET (UTC+1)				Stadium: Stade Saint-Symphorien

27 November 1999 17	Montpellier	0–1	Paris Saint-Germain	Montpellier
19:00 CET (UTC+1)				Stadium: Stade de la Mosson

3 December 1999 18	Bordeaux	2–0	Montpellier	Bordeaux
20:00 CET (UTC+1)				Stadium: Stade Chaban-Delmas

11 December 1999 19	Montpellier	1–1	Strasbourg	Montpellier
20:00 CET (UTC+1)				Stadium: Stade de la Mosson

18 December 1999 20	Monaco	1–0	Montpellier	Monaco
20:00 CET (UTC+1)				Stadium: Stade Louis II

12 January 2000 21	Montpellier	3–0	Nantes	Montpellier
20:00 CET (UTC+1)	Delaye 24'; Mahouvé 52'; Garny 86'			Stadium: Stade de la Mosson; Attendance: 10,148; Referee: Pascal Garibian

16 January 2000 22	Marseille	0–0	Montpellier	Marseille
18:45 CET (UTC+1)				Stadium: Stade Vélodrome; Attendance: 50,565; Referee: Gilles Chéron

26 January 2000 23	Montpellier	1–0	Nancy	Montpellier
20:00 CET (UTC+1)				Stadium: Stade de la Mosson

2 February 2000 24	Sedan	2–1	Montpellier	Sedan
20:00 CET (UTC+1)				Stadium: Stade Louis Dugauguez

5 February 2000 25	Montpellier	0–0	Le Havre	Montpellier
20:00 CET (UTC+1)				Stadium: Stade de la Mosson

16 February 2000 26	Saint-Étienne	5–4	Montpellier	Sedan
20:00 CET (UTC+1)				Stadium: Stade Geoffroy-Guichard

26 February 2000 27	Montpellier	1–1	Lens	Montpellier
19:00 CET (UTC+1)				Stadium: Stade de la Mosson

11 March 2000 28	Bastia	1–0	Montpellier	Furiani
20:00 CET (UTC+1)				Stadium: Stade Armand-Cesari

25 March 2000 29	Montpellier	2–0	Auxerre	Montpellier
20:00 CET (UTC+1)				Stadium: Stade de la Mosson

8 April 2000 30	Montpellier	2–2	Troyes	Montpellier
20:00 CEST (UTC+2)				Stadium: Stade de la Mosson

15 April 2000 31	Rennes	1–3	Montpellier	Rennes
20:00 CEST (UTC+2)				Stadium: Stade de la Route de Lorient

29 April 2000 32	Montpellier	0–1	Metz	Montpellier
20:00 CEST (UTC+2)				Stadium: Stade de la Mosson

4 May 2000 33	Paris Saint-Germain	3–0	Montpellier	Paris
20:00 CEST (UTC+2)	Robert 3'; Rodriguez 66' (o.g.); Ducrocq 90'			Stadium: Parc des Princes; Attendance: 36,683; Referee: Laurent Duhamel
Note: The referee was replaced in the 25th minute by Frank Sergeant due to an injury.

13 May 2000 34	Montpellier	2–2	Lyon	Montpellier
20:00 CEST (UTC+2)	Silvestre 22'; Maoulida 84'		Laigle 32'; Sonny Anderson 44'	Stadium: Stade de la Mosson; Attendance: 15,351; Referee: Jean-Claude Puyalt

=== Coupe de France ===
21 January 2000 Round of 64	Lorient	2–1	Montpellier	Lorient
20:00 CET (UTC+1)	Darcheville 7', 55'		Loko 44'	Stadium: Stade du Moustoir; Attendance: 5,000; Referee: Patrick Lhermite

=== Coupe de la Ligue ===
9 January 2000 Round of 32	Guingamp	1–3	Montpellier	Guingamp
17:30 CET (UTC+1)	Tasfaout 20' (pen.)		Džodić 10'; Fugier 57'; Delaye 67'	Stadium: Stade de Roudourou; Attendance: 7,662; Referee: Franck Glochon

30 January 2000 Round of 16	Bastia	1–0	Montpellier	Furiani
16:15 CET (UTC+1)	Jurietti 31'			Stadium: Stade Armand Cesari; Attendance: 5,000; Referee: Claude Colombo

=== UEFA Cup ===
==== First round ====
14 September 1999 First leg	Red Star Belgrade (Federal Republic of Yugoslavia)	0–1	(France) Montpellier	Sofia, Bulgaria
16:00 EEST (UTC+3)		Report	Loko 6'	Stadium: Stadion Georgi Asparuhov; Attendance: 8,500; Referee: Dermot Gallagher (England)

28 September 1999 Second leg	Montpellier (France)	2–2 (3–2 agg.)	(Federal Republic of Yugoslavia) Red Star Belgrade	Montpellier, France
18:00 CEST (UTC+2)	Ouédec 34'; Delaye 52'	Report	Jelić 48'; Bošković 55'	Stadium: Stade de la Mosson; Attendance: 9,246; Referee: Livio Bazzoli (Italy)

==== Second round ====
19 October 1999 First leg	Deportivo La Coruña (Spain)	3–1	(France) Montpellier	A Coruña, Spain
18:00 CEST (UTC+2)	Pauleta 17'; Djalminha 51' (pen.); Makaay 53'	Report	Delaye 6'	Stadium: Estadio Riazor; Attendance: 12,987; Referee: Kyros Vassaras (Greece)

4 November 1999 Second leg	Montpellier (France)	0–2 (1–5 agg.)	(Spain) Deportivo La Coruña	Montpellier, France
18:00 CET (UTC+1)		Report	Makaay 45'; Pauleta 82'	Stadium: Stade de la Mosson; Attendance: 16,845; Referee: Herbert Fandel (Germany)
