= Džodić =

Džodić (Serbian: Џодић, romanized: Dzhodich) is a Serbian surname. Notable people with the surname include:

- Nenad Džodić (born 1977), Serbian football defender
- Stefan Džodić (born 2005), Serbian football midfielder
- Viktor Džodić (born 2006), Serbian football goalkeeper
