= Janne Räsänen =

Finnish footballer (born 1978)

Personal information
- Full name: Janne Petri Räsänen
- Date of birth: 12 May 1978 (age 48)
- Place of birth: Nurmijärvi, Finland
- Height: 1.88 m (6 ft 2 in)
- Position: Defender

Youth career
- 1988–1992: Rajamäen Kehitys
- 1993–1995: TiPS

Senior career*
Years	Team	Apps	(Gls)
1995–1996	TiPS	45	(1)
1997–1999	FinnPa	43	(1)
1999–2000	Jokerit	23	(0)
2001–2005	Tampere United	121	(9)
2005–2007	Hønefoss	26	(2)

International career
1997–1999	Finland U21	18	(0)
2004	Finland	1	(0)
- * Club domestic league appearances and goals

Janne Räsänen (born 12 May 1978) is a Finnish former professional footballer who played as a defender. He was capped once for the Finland national team in 2004. Räsänen won the Finnish championship title with Tampere United in 2001 and the Finnish Cup with Jokerit in 1999. He also played for Hønefoss in Norwegian second tier. After retiring as a player, Räsänen has worked for Ilves youth sector as an executive manager.

== Honours ==
Tampere United

- Veikkausliiga: 2001

Jokerit

- Finnish Cup: 1999
