= Matti Hiukka =

Finnish footballer and manager (born 1975)

Personal information
- Date of birth: May 5, 1975 (age 51)
- Place of birth: Rovaniemi, Finland
- Height: 1.87 m (6 ft 1 1/2 in)
- Position: Forward

Youth career
- –1995: RoPS

Senior career*
Years	Team	Apps	(Gls)
1995—1998	RoPS	80	(21)
1999–2000	FC Jokerit	45	(12)
2001	HJK	26	(4)
2002	Tampere Utd	15	(1)
2002–2003	FC Jokerit	15	(2)
2003–2004	Hapoel Rishon LeZion	1	(0)
2004	RoPS	24	(2)
2005	Santa Claus	16	(2)
2006	RoPS	4	(1)
2006	FC Lynx	18	(13)
2009	FC Muurola	2	(1)

International career^{‡}
1999	Finland	2	(0)

Managerial career
- 2005–2010: Santa Claus
- 2011: RoPS
- * Club domestic league appearances and goals as of 16 August 2014 ‡ National team caps and goals as of 16 August 2014

Matti Hiukka (born 5 May 1975) is a Finnish football manager and a former footballer.

== Honours ==
=== Club honours ===
- Finnish Cup: 1999

=== Personal honours ===
- Veikkausliiga top scorer: 1998
