= Vladimir Komarov (disambiguation) =

Vladimir Komarov (1927–1967) was a Soviet cosmonaut, killed on landing in the Soyuz 1 mission.

Vladimir Komarov may also refer to other notable people:

- Vladimir Komarov (speed skater) (1949–2018), Olympic speed skater
- Vladimir Leontyevich Komarov (1869–1945), Russian botanist
- Vladimir Komarov (footballer) (born 1980), Russian association football player
- Vladimir Komarov (musician) (born 1976), Russian musician

== See also ==
- Kosmonavt Vladimir Komarov, satellite tracking ship, named after the cosmonaut
