= Graham Bencini =

Maltese footballer

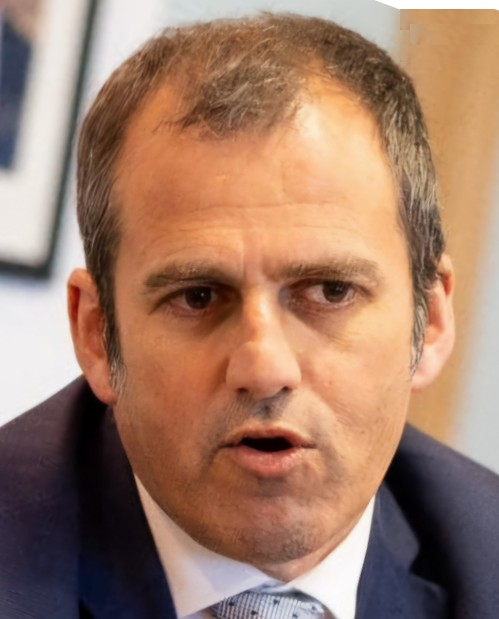
- portrait of Graham Bencini

Personal information
- Full name: Graham Bencini
- Date of birth: 25 July 1976 (age 50)
- Place of birth: Sliema, Malta
- Height: 5 ft 10 in (1.78 m)
- Position: Defender

Youth career
- 1985–1995: Sliema Wanderers

Senior career*
Years	Team	Apps	(Gls)
1995–1996	Sliema Wanderers	1	(0)
1996–1998	Naxxar Lions	47	(1)
1998–2001	Birkirkara	65	(0)
2001–2004	Hamrun Spartans	53	(2)
2004	Sliema Wanderers	5	(0)
2004–2005	Floriana	4	(0)
2005	Għajnsielem	14	
2005–2007	Marsa	39	(0)
2007–2008	Tarxien Rainbows		

International career^{‡}
- Malta U21
1999-2023	Malta	3	(0)
- * Club domestic league appearances and goals as of 11 January 2010 ‡ National team caps and goals as of 11 January 2010

Graham Bencini (born 25 July 1976 in Sliema, Malta) is a Chartered Accountant, a member of Parliament in Malta and a former professional footballer where he played as a defender.

== Professional career ==
Bencini obtained a Bachelor of Science Degree in Business Management & Computing, an Honours Degree in Business Management, and a Master’s Degree in Business Administration from the University of Malta.

He then went on to achieve a professional qualification with the Association of Chartered Certified Accountants in London, United Kingdom.

Today he is a Fellow of the Association of Chartered Certified Accountants, a member of the Malta Institute of Accountants, a member of the Institute of Financial Services Practitioners, a Certified Public Accountant Warrant Holder and a registered Tax Practitioner.

== Playing career ==
=== National team ===
Bencini has 3 official caps with the Senior Malta National Football team having played three times for the Malta national team. Twice in a friendly match against Bosnia and Herzegovina and Poland once in a Euro 2000 qualifier against FR Yugoslavia.

Bencini has also represented the Malta National Football team at U/21 Level.

=== Sliema Wanderers ===
Bencini began playing football when he was eight years old. He joined the Sliema Wanderers nursery, where he stayed for ten years winning all youth championship honours during that time.

At 18 years old, Graham was promoted to the senior team, and made his Maltese Premier League debut against Naxxar Lions, during this time Bencini was also a member of the Malta U21 team.

Despite only playing one game for Sliema Wanderers, Graham won a medal in his first professional season, with Sliema Wanderers been crowned champions for the 1995–96 season.

=== Naxxar Lions ===
With first team opportunities hard to come by at Sliema Wanderers, Bencini joined fellow Maltese Premier League side Naxxar Lions the following season.

In his first season with Naxxar Lions, Bencini was voted as the Player of The Year, and made 22 appearances and even scored his first goal in the Maltese Premier League.

The following season, Graham made 25 appearances and helped secure an eighth-place finish and another season in Premier League.

=== Birkirkara ===
For the 1998–99 season, Graham Bencini was signed by Birkirkara, upon joining Birkirkara, Bencini was also selected for the first time to form part on the Malta national team under the guidance of Josep Ilic.

Bencini stayed with Birkirkara for three seasons, making 65 appearances and winning three trophies, the Premier League (1999–00), MFA Super 5 Lottery Tournament (1998) and the Euro Challenge/Lowenbrau Cup (1998).

He also got the chance to take part in two exhibition matches against Juventus and Manchester United.

=== Ħamrun Spartans ===
For the 2001–02 season, Bencini left Birkirkara and joined fellow Premier League side Hamrun Spartans.

Graham spent three seasons with the club, making 53 appearances and scoring two goals.

=== Sliema Wanderers ===
Following some good form with Hamrun Spartans, Bencini re-joined his home town club Sliema Wanderers in January 2004.

He spent half a season with Sliema Wanderers, making five appearances, and winning his third Premier League, as well as the Maltese Cup and the MFA Super 5 Lottery Tournament.

=== Floriana ===
In May 2004, Bencini joined Floriana for the 2004–05 season.

Graham only made a total four appearances with Floriana due to an injury ravaged season where he spent most of the season in the treatment room.

=== Għajnsielem ===
Bencini then moved to join Gozo Football League team Għajnsielem for the 2005–06 season.

A host of ex-Malta national team players were asked to join the club, and Graham was one of them, he was also joined by Maltese players Daniel Bogdanovic, Richard Buhagiar and David Carabott.

During his time with Għajnsielem, Graham won the Gozo Football League title.

=== Marsa ===
Graham returned to Malta for 2005–06 season, where he joined First Division team Marsa.

In his first season Bencini achieved promotion back to the Premier League, after finishing in 2nd place.

During his two-year career with Marsa, Bencini made 39 appearances and was also the team captain.

=== Post-retirement ===
Since his retirement Graham has played for Valletta FC Futsal Club in the Maltese futsal league.

== Honours ==
=== Sliema Wanderers ===
Winner

- 1995/96, 2003/04 Maltese Premier League
- 2004 Maltese Cup
- 2004 MFA Super 5 Lottery Tournament

=== Birkirkara ===
Winner

- 1999/00 Maltese Premier League
- 1998 MFA Super 5 Lottery Tournament
- 1998 Euro Challenge/Lowenbrau Cup

=== Għajnsielem ===
Winner

- 2005 Gozo Football League

== Political career ==
Following his retirement from sports, Bencini transitioned into the political arena, where he was one of the founders of the Forum for Professionals of the Partit Nazzjonalista (FPPN). He was elected to serve as the first president of the FPPN and was re-elected as president for 8 consecutive years. He relinquished his post when he was elected to serve as the Chairman of the Administrative Council of the Partit Nazzjonalista.

Bencini contested the Malta General Election in 2022 where he was elected on the 10th district following a casual election.

He was entrusted with the Sports and Public Broadcasting portfolio in the Bernard Grech's (Partit Nazzjonalista and Opposition leader) shadow cabinet.

In January 2024, following a shadow cabinet reshuffle, Bencini was appointed as Shadow Minister for Finance.

He is also a permanent member of the Public Accounts Committee and the Economic and Financial affairs committee, both being Parliamentary Committees.
