= Tero Koskela =

Finnish footballer (born 1976)

Personal information
- Full name: Tero Antero Koskela
- Date of birth: 13 October 1976 (age 50)
- Place of birth: Kokkola, Finland
- Height: 1.75 m (5 ft 9 in)
- Position: Midfielder

Senior career*
Years	Team	Apps	(Gls)
1996–1997	VPS	29	(1)
1998	Jazz	25	(4)
1999–2000	Jokerit	45	(4)
2001–2003	Tampere United	55	(7)
2004–2005	Fredrikstad	24	(0)
2005–2006	Hønefoss	34	(2)
2007–2008	Honka	38	(3)
2009–2012	VPS	59	(2)
- * Club domestic league appearances and goals as of 7 August 2024

Tero Antero Koskela (born 13 October 1976) is a Finnish former footballer who played as a midfielder.

== Career statistics ==
Appearances and goals by club, season and competition
Club	Season	League			National cup (Note: Includes Suomen Cup)		League cup (Note: Includes Finnish League Cup)		Europe		Total	
Club	Season	Division	Apps	Goals	Apps	Goals	Apps	Goals	Apps	Goals	Apps	Goals
KPV	1994	Ykkönen					–		–			
KPV	1995	Ykkönen					–		–			
KPV	Total		43	2	0	0	–	–	–	–	43	2
VPS	1996	Veikkausliiga	14	0	0	0	–		–		14	0
VPS	1997	Veikkausliiga	15	1	0	0	–		–		15	1
VPS	Total		29	1	0	0	–	–	–	–	29	1
Jazz	1998	Veikkausliiga	25	4	0	0	–		–		25	4
Jokerit	1999	Veikkausliiga	17	0	1	0	–		5 (Note: Appearances in UEFA Intertoto Cup)	2	23	2
Jokerit	2000	Veikkausliiga	28	4	0	0	–		1 (Note: Appearance(s) in UEFA Cup)	0	29	4
Jokerit	Total		45	4	1	0	0	0	6	2	52	6
Tampere United	2001	Veikkausliiga	8	1	1	0	–		–		9	1
Tampere United	2002	Veikkausliiga	21	0	0	0	–		2 (Note: Appearances in UEFA Champions League)	0	23	0
Tampere United	2003	Veikkausliiga	26	6	0	0	–		6	1	32	7
Tampere United	Total		55	7	1	0	0	0	8	1	64	8
Fredrikstad	2004	Tippeligaen	25	0	3	0	–		–		28	0
Fredrikstad	2005	Tippeligaen	4	0	2	0	–		–		6	0
Fredrikstad	Total		29	0	5	0	–	–	–	–	34	0
Fredrikstad 2	2004	3. divisjon	1	0	–		–		–		1	0
Hønefoss	2005	1. divisjon	11	0	2	0	–		–		13	0
Hønefoss	2006	1. divisjon	23	1	1	0	–		–		24	1
Hønefoss	Total		34	1	3	0	–	–	–	–	37	1
Honka	2007	Veikkausliiga	22	2	1	0	–		4	0	27	2
Honka	2008	Veikkausliiga	16	1	3	0	–		3	1	22	2
Honka	Total		38	3	4	0	0	0	7	1	49	4
VPS	2009	Veikkausliiga	24	2	0	0	7	0	–		31	2
VPS	2010	Veikkausliiga	18	0	1	0	0	0	–		19	0
VPS	2011	Veikkausliiga	16	0	0	0	1	0	–		17	0
VPS	2012	Veikkausliiga	1	0	1	0	2	0	–		4	0
VPS	Total		59	2	2	0	10	0	–	–	71	2
KPV	2012	Kakkonen	4	1	–		–		–		4	1
Career total			362	29	16	0	10	0	21	4	409	33
