= Jarno Tuunainen =

Finnish footballer (born 1977)

Personal information
- Date of birth: 5 November 1977 (age 48)
- Place of birth: Helsinki, Finland
- Height: 1.73 m (5 ft 8 in)
- Position: Defender

Team information
- Current team: MyPa
- Number: 5

Senior career*
Years	Team	Apps	(Gls)
1998	PK-35	12	(0)
1999	FC Jokerit	7	(0)
1999	TPV	1	(0)
2000	FC Jokerit	25	(0)
2001	Atlantis FC	33	(0)
2002–2005	AC Allianssi	72	(4)
2006–2007	FC KooTeePee	45	(1)
2008–	MyPa	37	(1)

International career
2008–	Finland	6	(0)
- * Club domestic league appearances and goals as of 27 June 2010

Jarno Tuunainen (born 5 November 1977) is a Finnish footballer who currently plays for MyPa in Finnish Veikkausliiga.
