= 1999 Veikkausliiga =

Veikkausliiga
- Season: 1999
- Champions: Haka Valkeakoski

Statistics of Veikkausliiga in the 1999 season.

== Overview ==
It was contested by 12 teams, and Haka Valkeakoski won the championship.

== Preliminary stage ==
=== Table ===
Pos	Team	Pld	W	D	L	GF	GA	GD	Pts	Qualification
1	Haka Valkeakoski	22	15	5	2	43	17	+26	50	Qualification to Championship group
2	HJK Helsinki	22	14	5	3	43	14	+29	47	Qualification to Championship group
3	FC Inter Turku	22	10	4	8	28	25	+3	34	Qualification to Championship group
4	FC Jokerit	22	9	6	7	26	22	+4	33	Qualification to Championship group
5	MyPa Anjalankoski	22	9	6	7	27	27	0	33	Qualification to Championship group
6	FC Jazz Pori	22	7	10	5	28	24	+4	31	Qualification to Championship group
7	KTP Kotka	22	7	7	8	22	25	−3	28	Qualification to Championship group
8	RoPS Rovaniemi	22	6	9	7	27	30	−3	27	Qualification to Championship group
9	TPS Turku	22	7	6	9	27	31	−4	27	Qualification to Relegation group
10	FC Lahti	22	6	4	12	25	41	−16	22	Qualification to Relegation group
11	VPS Vaasa	22	6	3	13	22	33	−11	21	Qualification to Relegation group
12	TPV Tampere	22	1	5	16	13	42	−29	8	Qualification to Relegation group

Source: rsssf.com

=== Results ===
Home \ Away	HAK	HJK	INT	JAZ	JOK	KTP	LAH	MYP	RPS	TPS	TPV	VPS
FC Haka		1–0	1–0	1–1	2–2	4–1	4–2	4–0	0–0	5–2	3–1	2–0
HJK Helsinki	0–1		0–1	4–1	2–1	3–1	1–1	2–0	4–0	0–0	2–0	3–0
Inter Turku	0–1	2–7		3–0	1–0	0–0	3–1	1–2	2–2	1–2	2–0	3–1
Jazz	2–2	1–1	1–1		1–1	1–1	3–0	3–0	2–0	3–2	2–0	0–1
Jokerit	1–0	1–2	0–1	0–0		1–0	1–0	0–1	1–1	1–1	1–0	1–0
KTP	1–0	1–1	1–0	0–1	3–4		0–1	0–0	1–1	2–0	1–0	2–2
Lahti	0–2	2–5	3–2	2–2	0–1	0–1		1–2	1–0	1–2	1–1	2–1
MyPa	1–2	0–3	0–1	2–0	2–0	0–0	4–0		1–1	3–1	1–1	1–1
RoPS	2–3	0–1	3–1	0–0	3–0	1–2	2–2	2–1		1–0	2–2	3–2
TPS	1–1	0–0	0–1	1–1	1–1	0–3	1–2	2–3	4–1		2–0	2–1
TPV	0–3	0–1	0–0	1–3	0–5	2–0	1–2	2–2	0–2	0–1		1–3
VPS	0–1	0–1	0–2	1–0	1–3	3–1	2–1	0–1	0–0	0–2	3–1	

Legend: Blue = home team win; Yellow = draw; Red = away team win.

== Final stage ==
=== Championship group ===
==== Table ====
Pos	Team	Pld	W	D	L	GF	GA	GD	Pts	Qualification
1	Haka Valkeakoski (C)	29	20	7	2	54	18	+36	67	Qualification to Champions League first qualifying round
2	HJK Helsinki	29	20	5	4	53	18	+35	65	Qualification to UEFA Cup qualifying round
3	MyPa Anjalankoski	29	13	8	8	39	32	+7	47	Qualification to Intertoto Cup first round
4	FC Jokerit	29	11	7	11	35	31	+4	40	Qualification to UEFA Cup qualifying round (Note: FC Jokerit as winners of the 1999 Finnish Cup qualified for the qualifying round of the 2000–01 UEFA Cup.)
5	FC Inter Turku	29	11	6	12	38	37	+1	39	
6	FC Jazz Pori	29	8	13	8	32	34	−2	37	
7	KTP Kotka	29	8	10	11	29	35	−6	34	
8	RoPS Rovaniemi	29	7	10	12	31	46	−15	31	

Source: rsssf.com
(C) Champions

==== Results ====
Home \ Away	HAK	HJK	INT	JAZ	JOK	KTP	MYP	RPS
FC Haka		1–0		0–0	2–0			2–0
HJK Helsinki			2–1		2–1	1–0	2–1	
Inter Turku	0–3				0–1	3–3	0–2	
Jazz		0–2	1–1			1–0		
Jokerit				1–1		1–2	1–2	4–0
KTP	1–3						0–0	1–1
MyPa	0–0			4–1				3–1
RoPS		0–1	0–5	2–0				

Legend: Blue = home team win; Yellow = draw; Red = away team win.

=== Relegation group ===
==== Table ====
Pos	Team	Pld	W	D	L	GF	GA	GD	Pts	Qualification or relegation
1	TPS Turku	28	10	9	9	40	34	+6	39	
2	FC Lahti (O)	28	8	6	14	34	55	−21	30	Qualification to relegation play-offs
3	VPS Vaasa (O)	28	8	5	15	34	42	−8	29	Qualification to relegation play-offs
4	TPV Tampere (R)	28	2	6	20	23	60	−37	12	Relegation to Ykkönen

Source: rsssf.com
(O) Play-off winners; (R) Relegated

==== Results ====
Home \ Away	LAH	TPS	TPV	VPS
Lahti		0–3	4–3	0–4
TPS	0–0		1–1	1–1
TPV	2–3	0–6		3–1
VPS	2–2	1–2	3–1	

Legend: Blue = home team win; Yellow = draw; Red = away team win.

== Attendances ==
No.	Club	Average
1	KooTeePee	3,105
2	HJK	2,919
3	Jokerit	2,297
4	VPS	2,255
5	Haka	2,202
6	TPS	1,769
7	MyPa	1,622
8	Jazz	1,553
9	RoPS	1,541
10	Lahti	1,449
11	Inter Turku	1,398
12	TPV	1,133

== See also ==
- Suomen Cup 1999
