= Volodymyr Matsyhura =

Ukrainian footballer

Personal information
- Full name: Volodymyr Vasylyovych Matsyhura
- Date of birth: 14 May 1975 (age 51)
- Place of birth: Kyiv, Ukrainian SSR
- Height: 1.78 m (5 ft 10 in)
- Positions: Defender; midfielder

Youth career
- FC Dynamo Kyiv

Senior career*
Years	Team	Apps	(Gls)
1992–1993	Dynamo-3 Kyiv	23	(1)
1993–1994	Boryspil	32	(2)
1994–1996	CSKA-Borysfen Boryspil	35	(0)
1996–2000	Rostselmash Rostov-on-Don	68	(2)
1996–2000	→ Rostselmash-d Rostov-on-Don	36	(4)
2000–2001	Kocaelispor	14	(1)
2001	CSKA Kyiv	5	(0)
2001	→ CSKA-2 Kyiv	3	(0)
2001–2002	Metalist Kharkiv	26	(1)
2001	→ Metalist-2 Kharkiv	1	(0)
2003	Volgar-Gazprom Astrakhan	30	(0)
2004–2005	Spartak-Horobyna Sumy	26	(0)
2005	Taraz	5	(0)
- * Club domestic league appearances and goals

Volodymyr Vasylyovych Matsyhura (Ukrainian: Володимир Васильович Мацигура; born 14 May 1975) is a former professional Ukrainian footballer.

== Club career ==
He made his professional debut in the Ukrainian Second League in 1993 for FC Boryspil. He played 4 games and scored 1 goal in the 1999 UEFA Intertoto Cup for FC Rostselmash Rostov-on-Don.
