= Serbia national under-21 football team =

National association football team

Serbia U-21
- Nickname: Орлићи / Orlići (Little Eagles)
- Association: Football Association of Serbia
- Confederation: UEFA (Europe)
- Head coach: Zoran Mirković
- Captain: Stefan Leković
- Most caps: Branislav Ivanović (38)
- Top scorer: Uroš Đurđević (16)
- FIFA code: SRB
First colours	Second colours

First international
- FR Yugoslavia 1–0 Malta (Zrenjanin, FR Yugoslavia, 1 June 1996)

Biggest win
- Serbia and Montenegro 9–0 San Marino (Novi Sad, Serbia and Montenegro; 12 October 2004)

Biggest defeat
- England 9–1 Serbia (West Bridgford, England; 12 October 2023)

UEFA U-21 Championship
- Appearances: 11 (first in 1978)
- Best result: Champions (1978)

The Serbia national under-21 football team is the national under-21 football team of Serbia and is controlled by the Football Association of Serbia. Both FIFA and UEFA consider the Serbia national team to be the direct and sole successor of the Yugoslavia under-21 and Serbia and Montenegro under-21 national teams.

== History ==
Serbia's under-21 national team qualified for the 2007 UEFA European Under-21 Championship held in the Netherlands, in June 2007, after winning a two-game play-off against Sweden. After a 3–0 loss at home, Serbia overturned the result two weeks later, defeating Sweden 5–0, and advancing to the final tournament. Serbia's 2007 U21 Championship campaign was successful, as they finished in second place, losing the final to the hosts, by a score of 4–1. On their way to the final, they defeated Italy (1–0), Czech Republic (1–0) and Belgium (2–0). The only other loss, besides the final, was the third group game against England (0–2), which was a meaningless game for the Serbian team, as they had already qualified for the semi-finals.

== Competitive record ==
Champions Runners-Up Third Place Fourth Place

=== UEFA European Under-21 Championship record ===
Tournament record									Qualification record					
Year	Round	Position	GP	W	D	L	GS	GA	GP	W	D	L	GF	GA
as part of SFR Yugoslavia
(European Union) 1978	Champions	1st	6	3	2	1	10	7	4	3	0	1	9	3
(European Union) 1980	Semi-finals	4th	4	1	1	2	3	6	4	2	2	0	4	2
(European Union) 1982	Did not qualify								4	2	1	1	4	2
(European Union) 1984	Semi-finals	4th	4	1	0	3	4	6	6	3	2	1	12	5
(European Union) 1986	Did not qualify								6	1	2	3	10	16
(European Union) 1988	Did not qualify								4	1	1	2	7	9
(European Union) 1990	Runner-up	2nd	6	2	2	2	8	9	6	4	1	1	10	4
(European Union) 1992	Did not qualify								6	4	0	2	11	10
as part of FR Yugoslavia
(France) 1994	Suspended								Suspended					
(Spain) 1996	Suspended								Suspended					
(Romania) 1998	Did not qualify								8	6	0	2	14	3
(Slovakia) 2000	Did not qualify								9	5	2	2	29	13
(Switzerland) 2002	Did not qualify								8	4	3	1	22	11
as part of Serbia and Montenegro
(Germany) 2004	Runner-up	2nd	6	2	2	2	7	9	10	7	1	2	21	12
(Portugal) 2006	Semi-finals	4th	4	1	1	2	2	3	12	9	1	2	34	13
as Serbia
(Netherlands) 2007	Runner-up	2nd	5	3	0	2	5	6	4	3	0	1	10	4
(Sweden) 2009	Group stage	6th	3	0	2	1	1	3	10	7	2	1	26	5
(Denmark) 2011	Did not qualify								8	4	1	3	14	12
(Israel) 2013	Did not qualify								10	5	3	2	17	6
(Czech Republic) 2015	Group stage	8th	3	0	1	2	1	7	10	6	2	2	20	11
(Poland) 2017	Group stage	10th	3	0	1	2	2	5	12	8	2	2	29	9
(Italy) (San Marino) 2019	Group stage	12th	3	0	0	3	1	10	10	8	2	0	23	5
(Hungary) (Slovenia) 2021	Did not qualify								10	3	3	4	12	9
(Georgia (country)) (Romania) 2023	Did not qualify								10	3	3	4	10	11
(Slovakia) 2025	Did not qualify								10	5	1	4	13	18
(Albania) (Serbia) 2027	Qualified as co-host								Qualified as co-host					
Total:11/24	1 Title	2nd	47	13	12	22	44	71	181	103	35	43	361	193

=== Olympic Games record ===
Year	Round	Position	GP	W	D	L	GS	GA
as part of FR Yugoslavia
(United States) 1996	Suspended							
(Australia) 2000	Did not qualify							
as part of Serbia and Montenegro
(Greece) 2004	Group stage	16th	3	0	0	3	3	14
as Serbia
(China) 2008	Group stage	12th	3	0	1	2	3	7
(United Kingdom) 2012	Did not qualify							
(Brazil) 2016	Did not qualify							
(Japan) 2020	Did not qualify							
(France) 2024	Did not qualify							
(United States) 2028	To be determined							
(Australia) 2032	To be determined							
Total:2/7	Group stage	12th	6	0	1	5	6	21

== Players ==
=== Current squad ===
The following 26 players have been called up for the friendly matches against the North Macedonia U21 on 12 November, and the Poland U21 on 17 November 2026.

Caps and goals updated as of 12 November 2026, after the match against North Macedonia U21.

No.	Pos.	Player	Date of birth (age)	Caps	Goals	Club
12	GK	Luka Lijeskić	23 February 2005 (age 21)	9	0	(Football Association of Serbia) Radnički 1923
23	GK	Bogdan Matijašević	27 May 2004 (age 22)	2	0	(Football Association of Serbia) Novi Pazar
	GK	Vukašin Jovanović	30 September 2007 (age 19)	0	0	(Football Association of Serbia) Mačva
2	DF	Uroš Tegeltija	19 March 2006 (age 20)	6	0	(Football Association of Serbia) Železničar Pančevo
3	DF	Viktor Radojević	14 July 2004 (age 22)	10	0	(Canadian Soccer Association) Montréal
5	DF	Bojan Kovačević	22 May 2004 (age 22)	13	1	(Royal Spanish Football Federation) Cádiz
6	DF	Petar Petrović	13 July 2005 (age 21)	7	0	(Austrian Football Association) Sturm Graz
13	DF	Đorđe Petrović	3 February 2006 (age 20)	5	1	(Football Association of Serbia) Radnički Niš
14	DF	Ognjen Mimović	17 August 2004 (age 22)	11	0	(Turkish Football Federation) Fenerbahçe
15	DF	Nemanja Vidojević	5 July 2004 (age 22)	4	0	(Football Association of Serbia) Železničar Pančevo
16	DF	Veljko Milosavljević	28 June 2006 (age 20)	4	0	(The Football Association) Bournemouth
4	MF	Mateja Stjepanović	20 February 2004 (age 22)	7	0	(Portuguese Football Federation) Moreirense
7	MF	Nemanja Trifunović	29 June 2004 (age 22)	7	0	(Football Association of Serbia) Partizan
8	MF	Jovan Milosavljević	8 February 2007 (age 19)	1	1	(Swedish Football Association) Malmö
11	MF	Milan Kolarević	7 April 2004 (age 22)	3	0	(Football Association of Serbia) Vojvodina
17	MF	Aleksa Kuljanin	17 January 2004 (age 22)	8	3	(Football Association of Serbia) Železničar Pančevo
18	MF	Miloš Popović	5 February 2004 (age 22)	1	0	(Football Association of Serbia) Radnik Surdulica
20	MF	Uroš Miladinović	16 June 2004 (age 22)	2	0	(Football Association of Serbia) Čukarički
21	MF	Matija Popović	8 January 2006 (age 20)	7	2	(Russian Football Union) CSKA Moscow
22	MF	Matija Mitrović	12 December 2004 (age 21)	15	5	(Portuguese Football Federation) Vitória de Guimarães
9	FW	Marko Lazetić	22 January 2004 (age 22)	14	1	(Football Federation of Armenia) Noah
10	FW	Jovan Mijatović	11 July 2005 (age 21)	15	5	(German Football Association) Eintracht Braunschweig
19	FW	Miloš Luković	18 November 2005 (age 20)	8	0	(German Football Association) Kaiserslautern
	FW	Jovan Milošević	31 July 2005 (age 21)	4	0	(Portuguese Football Federation) Braga

=== Recent call-ups ===
The following players have also been called up within the last twelve months and remain eligible for selection.

Pos.	Player	Date of birth (age)	Caps	Goals	Club	Latest call-up
GK	Vuk Draškić	11 May 2007 (age 19)	2	0	(Serbia) OFK Beograd	v. North Macedonia, 12 November 2026 ^{INJ}
GK	Viktor Džodić	15 November 2006 (age 19)	3	0	(France) Montpellier	v. Russia, 02 October 2026
GK	Aleksa Todorović	25 January 2004 (age 22)	2	0	(Croatia) Rijeka	v. Kyrgyzstan, 30 March 2026
GK	Lazar Kaličanin	21 May 2004 (age 22)	5	0	(Serbia) Čukarički	v. United States, 18 November 2025
GK	Željko Vitorović	2 February 2006 (age 20)	0	0	(Portugal) Estoril Praia U23	v. United States, 18 November 2025
GK	Jovan Miladinović	20 January 2007 (age 19)	0	0	(Serbia) Železničar Pančevo	v. United States, 18 November 2025
DF	Stefan Bukinac	8 July 2005 (age 21)	8	0	(Switzerland) Young Boys	v. North Macedonia, 12 November 2026 ^{SEN}
DF	Stefan Leković	9 January 2004 (age 22)	11	0	(Portugal) Estrela Amadora	v. North Macedonia, 12 November 2026 ^{INJ}
DF	Aleksej Vukićević	11 June 2005 (age 21)	13	0	(Serbia) OFK Beograd	v. Russia, 05 October 2026
DF	Stefan Gudelj	18 May 2006 (age 20)	4	0	(Serbia) Red Star Belgrade	v. Iraq, 28 September 2026 ^{SEN}
DF	Boris Matić	19 August 2004 (age 22)	4	0	(Austria) Wolfsberger	v. Kyrgyzstan, 30 March 2026
DF	Uroš Filipović	1 August 2006 (age 20)	1	0	(Serbia) Radnik Surdulica	v. Kyrgyzstan, 30 March 2026
DF	Uroš Ilić	15 January 2006 (age 20)	0	0	(Serbia) Radnik Surdulica	v. United States, 18 November 2025
DF	Andrej Popović	25 April 2006 (age 20)	0	0	(Spain) Almería	v. United States, 18 November 2025
MF	Milan Aleksić	30 August 2005 (age 21)	15	1	(Serbia) Partizan	v. Russia, 05 October 2026
MF	Ognjen Ugrešić	15 July 2006 (age 20)	8	0	(Greece) PAOK	v. Russia, 05 October 2026
MF	Janko Jevremović	14 July 2004 (age 22)	5	0	(Serbia) Železničar Pančevo	v. Russia, 05 October 2026
MF	Vasilije Novičić	7 May 2008 (age 18)	4	0	(Serbia) IMT	v. Russia, 05 October 2026
MF	Lazar Jovanović	30 November 2006 (age 19)	5	1	(Italy) Udinese	v. Iraq, 28 September 2026 ^{SUS}
MF	Jovan Šljivić	14 October 2005 (age 21)	12	0	(Serbia) OFK Beograd	v. Kyrgyzstan, 30 March 2026
MF	Stefan Džodić	15 March 2005 (age 21)	9	0	(Spain) Almería	v. Kyrgyzstan, 30 March 2026
MF	Zoran Alilović	14 March 2006 (age 20)	2	0	(Serbia) Partizan	v. Kyrgyzstan, 30 March 2026
MF	Mihajlo Petković	27 May 2004 (age 22)	4	0	(Serbia) Partizan	v. United States, 18 November 2025
FW	Vanja Vlahović	23 March 2004 (age 22)	11	5	(Italy) Mantova	v. Russia, 02 October 2026
FW	Mihailo Ivanović	29 November 2004 (age 21)	5	1	(England) Millwall	v. Kyrgyzstan, 30 March 2026

=== Previous squads ===
- 2004 UEFA European Under-21 Championship squad
- 2006 UEFA European Under-21 Championship squad
- 2007 UEFA European Under-21 Championship squad
- 2009 UEFA European Under-21 Championship squad
- 2015 UEFA European Under-21 Championship squad
- 2017 UEFA European Under-21 Championship squad
- 2019 UEFA European Under-21 Championship squad

== Coaches ==
Dates	Name
2025–	(Serbia) Zoran Mirković
2024–2025	(Serbia) Aleksandar Kolarov
2023–2024	(Serbia) Ljubinko Drulović
2023	(Serbia) Dušan Đorđević
2022–2023	(Serbia) Goran Stevanović
2021	(Serbia) Aleksandar Rogić (caretaker)
2021	(Serbia) Zvonko Živković
2019–2021	(Serbia) Ilija Stolica
2019	(Serbia) Nenad Milovanović
2017–2019	(Serbia) Goran Đorović
2017	(Serbia) Nenad Lalatović
2015–2016	(Serbia) Tomislav Sivić
2014–2015	(Serbia) Mladen Dodić
2013–2014	(Serbia) Radovan Ćurčić
2010–2012	(Serbia) Aleksandar Janković
2010	(Serbia) Tomislav Sivić (caretaker)
2009–2010	(Serbia) Ratomir Dujković
2007–2009	(Serbia) Slobodan Krčmarević
2006–2007	(Serbia) Miroslav Đukić

== See also ==
- UEFA European Under-21 Championship
- Serbia national football team
- Serbia national under-20 football team
- Serbia national under-19 football team
- Yugoslavia national under-21 football team
