= Philippe Delaye =

French retired footballer (born 1975)

Personal information
- Date of birth: 26 June 1975 (age 51)
- Place of birth: Montbrison, Loire, France
- Height: 1.74 m (5 ft 9 in)
- Position: Midfielder

Senior career*
Years	Team	Apps	(Gls)
1992–2000	Montpellier	125	(20)
2000–2004	Rennes	77	(11)
2004	Bastia	13	(0)
2005	Istres	13	(1)
2005–2010	Montpellier	119	(12)
Total		347	(44)
- * Club domestic league appearances and goals

Philippe Delaye (born 26 June 1975) is a French former professional footballer who played as a midfielder for Montpellier, among other teams.

== Personal life ==
Delaye is the father of Sacha Delaye, who is also a professional footballer and plays for Montpellier.

== Honours ==
Montpellier

- UEFA Intertoto Cup: 1999
