= Róbert Hanko =

Slovak footballer

Personal information
- Date of birth: 28 December 1976 (age 49)
- Height: 1.66 m (5 ft 5 in)
- Position: Midfielder

Senior career*
Years	Team	Apps	(Gls)
1996–2000	Ozeta Dukla Trenčín		
2000–2001	Karlsruhe		
2001–2004	AS Trenčín		
2005	OFK Veľký Lapáš		
2005–2006	Tatran Prešov		

International career
1999	Slovakia	3	(0)
- * Club domestic league appearances and goals

Róbert Hanko (born 28 December 1976) is a retired Slovak football midfielder.
