= Jiří Záleský =

Czech footballer

Personal information
- Date of birth: 20 October 1965 (age 61)
- Place of birth: Brno, Czechoslovakia
- Position: Midfielder

Senior career*
Years	Team	Apps	(Gls)
1983–1984	Zbrojovka Brno		
1984–1992	Baník Ostrava		
1990	→ Dukla Prague		
1992–1993	Boby Brno		
1992–1993	Baník Ostrava		
1994–1997	Skoda Xanthi		
1997–1999	Hradec Králové		
1999–2000	Panserraikos		

International career
- Czechoslovakia U21
- * Club domestic league appearances and goals

Jiří Záleský (born 20 October 1965) is a retired Czech football midfielder.
