= David Khmelidze =

Georgian footballer

Personal information
- Full name: David Murmanovich Khmelidze
- Date of birth: 28 April 1979 (age 47)
- Place of birth: Sochi, Russian SFSR
- Height: 1.96 m (6 ft 5 in)
- Position: Goalkeeper

Senior career*
Years	Team	Apps	(Gls)
1997–1999	Zhemchuzhina Sochi	0	(0)
1997–1999	→ Zhemchuzhina-2 Sochi	73	(0)
2000–2003	Rostov	2	(0)
2003	Zhemchuzhina Sochi	11	(0)
2004–2005	Spartak Chelyabinsk	31	(0)
2006	Zvezda Irkutsk	10	(0)
2006	Lokomotiv Minsk	7	(0)
2008	Ryazan	4	(0)
2008	Gornyak Uchaly	0	(0)

International career
- Georgia U21
2001	Georgia	1	(0)
- * Club domestic league appearances and goals

David Murmanovich Khmelidze (Russian: Давид Мурманович Хмелидзе; born 28 April 1979) is a former Georgian professional footballer. He also holds Russian citizenship.

== Club career ==
He made his professional debut in the Russian Third League in 1997 for FC Zhemchuzhina-d Sochi. He played 1 game in the 2000 UEFA Intertoto Cup for FC Rostselmash Rostov-on-Don.
