= Frédéric Garny =

French footballer (born 1974)

Personal information
- Full name: Frédéric Garny
- Date of birth: August 13, 1974 (age 52)
- Place of birth: Mulhouse, France
- Height: 1.70 m (5 ft 7 in)
- Position: Midfielder

Senior career*
Years	Team	Apps	(Gls)
1993–1996	Mulhouse	69	(6)
1996–1997	Sochaux	39	(6)
1997–2000	Montpellier	37	(4)
2000–2003	Chamois Niortais	83	(12)
2003–2005	Troyes	56	(3)
2005–2006	Angers	22	(4)
2006–2007	Sète	20	(2)
2007–2008	Mulhouse	20	(0)
- * Club domestic league appearances and goals

Frédéric Garny (born August 13, 1974) is a French former professional footballer who played as a right-winger.

== Transfer history ==
Season	Date	Left	Joined	MV	Fee
07/08	Jul 1, 2007	FC Sète 34	Retired	-	-
06/07	Jul 1, 2006	SCO Angers	FC Sète 34	-	?
05/06	Jul 1, 2005	Troyes	SCO Angers	-	Free transfer
03/04	Jul 1, 2003	Chamois Niort	Troyes	-	?
00/01	Jul 1, 2000	Montpellier	Chamois Niort	-	?
97/98	Jul 1, 1997	FC Sochaux	Montpellier	-	?
96/97	Jul 1, 1996	Mulhouse S-A	FC Sochaux	-	?
93/94	Jul 1, 1993	FC Mulhouse U19	Mulhouse S-A	-	-
Total transfer fees :					0
