= Viktors Lukaševičs =

Latvian footballer

Personal information
- Date of birth: 17 March 1972 (age 54)
- Height: 1.76 m (5 ft 9 1/2 in)
- Position: Defender

Senior career*
Years	Team	Apps	(Gls)
1997–2005	FK Ventspils	140	(6)
2007–2008	FK Vindava Ventspils	25	(0)

International career^{‡}
1998–2002	Latvia	23	(0)
- * Club domestic league appearances and goals ‡ National team caps and goals as of 4 October 2008

Viktors Lukaševičs (born 17 March 1972) is a former Latvian footballer.
