= Vladimir Komarov (footballer) =

Russian footballer

Personal information
- Full name: Vladimir Vadimovich Komarov
- Date of birth: August 2, 1980 (age 46)
- Height: 1.89 m (6 ft 2 1/2 in)
- Position: Defender

Senior career*
Years	Team	Apps	(Gls)
1997–1998	FC Volgar-Gazprom Astrakhan	9	(0)
1998–1999	FC Rostselmash-2 Rostov-on-Don	34	(5)
1999	FC Rostselmash Rostov-on-Don	1	(0)
2000	FC Volgar-Gazprom Astrakhan	0	(0)
2000	FC Sudostroitel Astrakhan	29	(1)
2001	FC Volgar-Gazprom Astrakhan	4	(0)
2001	FC Sudostroitel Astrakhan	10	(3)
2002	FC Neftekhimik Nizhnekamsk	15	(0)
2003	FC Vidnoye	30	(1)
2004	FC Volgar-Gazprom Astrakhan	16	(0)
2005	FC Lada-SOK Dimitrovgrad	17	(2)
2006–2007	FC Sudostroitel Astrakhan	49	(8)
2008–2010	FC Volgar-Gazprom Astrakhan	70	(3)
2011–2012	FC Astrakhan	30	(1)
2012–2013	FC Volgar-Astrakhan Astrakhan	21	(0)
- * Club domestic league appearances and goals as of 04:44, 23 June 2013 (UTC)

Vladimir Vadimovich Komarov (Russian: Владимир Вадимович Комаров; born 2 August 1980) is a former Russian professional footballer.

He made his debut in the Russian Premier League in 1999 for FC Rostselmash Rostov-on-Don, and played three games for them in the 1999 UEFA Intertoto Cup.
