= Nenad Džodić =

Serbian footballer

Personal information
- Full name: Nenad Džodić
- Date of birth: 4 January 1977 (age 49)
- Place of birth: Belgrade, SR Serbia, SFR Yugoslavia
- Height: 1.88 m (6 ft 2 in)
- Position: Defender

Youth career
- Zemun

Senior career*
Years	Team	Apps	(Gls)
1995–1997	Zemun	49	(3)
1997–2004	Montpellier	144	(3)
2004–2007	Ajaccio	70	(2)
2007–2011	Montpellier	92	(9)
Total		355	(17)

International career
1996–2000	FR Yugoslavia U21	11	(0)
1997	FR Yugoslavia U23	2	(0)
2002	FR Yugoslavia	5	(0)
- * Club domestic league appearances and goals

Nenad Džodić (Serbian Cyrillic: Ненад Џодић; born 4 January 1977) is a Serbian former professional footballer who played as a defender.

== Club career ==
Džodić came through the youth system at Zemun, making his senior debut in 1995. He played 49 league games and scored three goals over his two seasons with the club. In addition, Džodić made four appearances in the 1996 UEFA Intertoto Cup, scoring once.

In the summer of 1997, Džodić was transferred to French side Montpellier. He helped them win the 1999 UEFA Intertoto Cup, contributing with four goals in seven games. Overall, Džodić amassed 170 appearances and netted nine goals across all competitions in his first spell with the club. In August 2004, Džodić joined Ajaccio on a free transfer.

In July 2007, Džodić rejoined Montpellier. He helped the club return to the top flight in 2009. In October 2011, Džodić announced his retirement from professional football after struggling with injuries over the past two seasons.

== International career ==
At youth international level, Džodić made 11 appearances for the FR Yugoslavia under-21s during the team's two unsuccessful UEFA Under-21 Championship qualification cycles (1998 and 2000). He also competed with the under-23 team at the 1997 Mediterranean Games.

Džodić was capped five times for FR Yugoslavia at full level, with all appearances coming in 2002. He made his debut in a 2–1 friendly win over Mexico on 13 February. His last cap came on 6 September in a 5–0 friendly defeat to the Czech Republic.

== Personal life ==
Džodić also holds French citizenship. He is the father of fellow footballers Stefan and Viktor Džodić.

== Career statistics ==
=== Club ===
Appearances and goals by club, season and competition
Club	Season	League			National cup		League cup		Continental		Total	
Club	Season	Division	Apps	Goals	Apps	Goals	Apps	Goals	Apps	Goals	Apps	Goals
Zemun	1995–96	First League of FR Yugoslavia	21	1			—		—		21	1
Zemun	1996–97	First League of FR Yugoslavia	28	2			—		4	1	32	3
Zemun	Total		49	3			—		4	1	53	4
Montpellier	1997–98	French Division 1	8	0	0	0	1	0	1	0	10	0
Montpellier	1998–99	French Division 1	16	1	1	0	3	1	—		20	2
Montpellier	1999–2000	French Division 1	19	1	1	0	2	1	7	4	29	6
Montpellier	2000–01	French Division 2	25	0	2	0	1	0	—		28	0
Montpellier	2001–02	French Division 1	31	0	1	0	1	0	—		33	0
Montpellier	2002–03	Ligue 1	21	0	1	0	1	0	—		23	0
Montpellier	2003–04	Ligue 1	24	1	2	0	1	0	—		27	1
Montpellier	Total		144	3	8	0	10	2	8	4	170	9
Ajaccio	2004–05	Ligue 1	26	1	1	1	1	0	—		28	2
Ajaccio	2005–06	Ligue 1	13	0	0	0	3	0	—		16	0
Ajaccio	2006–07	Ligue 2	31	1	2	0	1	0	—		34	1
Ajaccio	Total		70	2	3	1	5	0	—		78	3
Montpellier	2007–08	Ligue 2	36	3	3	0	3	0	—		42	3
Montpellier	2008–09	Ligue 2	36	2	2	0	1	1	—		39	3
Montpellier	2009–10	Ligue 1	17	4	0	0	1	0	—		18	4
Montpellier	2010–11	Ligue 1	3	0	0	0	1	0	0	0	4	0
Montpellier	Total		92	9	5	0	6	1	0	0	103	10
Career total			355	17	16	1	21	3	12	5	404	26

=== International ===
Appearances and goals by national team and year
National team	Year	Apps	Goals
FR Yugoslavia	2002	5	0
Total		5	0

== Honours ==
Montpellier

- UEFA Intertoto Cup: 1999
