= Dirk Van Oekelen =

Belgian footballer (born 1971)

Personal information
- Date of birth: 31 March 1971 (age 55)
- Place of birth: Turnhout, Belgium
- Height: 1.90 m (6 ft 3 in)
- Position: Defender

Senior career*
Years	Team	Apps	(Gls)
1989–1998	Turnhout		
1998–2001	Sint-Truiden	84	(6)
2001–2002	RWDM	32	(0)
2002–2003	Beveren	11	(0)
2004–2005	Willebroek-Meerhof		
- * Club domestic league appearances and goals

Dirk Van Oekelen (born 31 March 1971) is a Belgian footballer who played as a defender.

Van Oekelen spent his early career in Turnhout, concurrent to studying at university. He joined Sint-Truiden in 1998. Playing 84 games for the club, he also finished a doctorate in biochemistry during his spell there. He also played in Belgian Pro League for RWDM and Beveren.

From 2020 to 2022, Van Oekelen was chief operations officer (COO) of Royal Antwerp FC.
