= Stefan Džodić =

Footballer (born 2005)

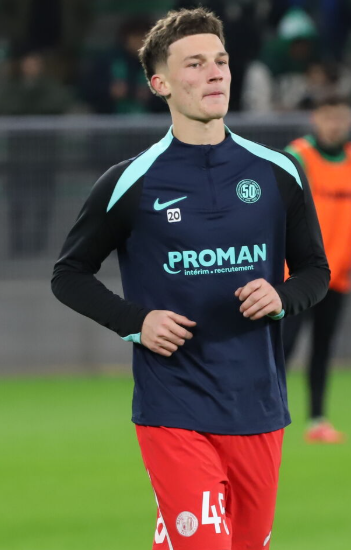

Personal information
- Date of birth: 15 March 2005 (age 21)
- Place of birth: Montpellier, France
- Height: 1.90 m (6 ft 3 in)
- Position: Midfielder

Team information
- Current team: Almería
- Number: 29

Youth career
- 2009–2022: Montpellier

Senior career*
Years	Team	Apps	(Gls)
2022–2025	Montpellier II	8	(0)
2024–2025	Montpellier	7	(0)
2025–	Almería	33	(1)

International career^{‡}
2021–2022	Serbia U17	10	(2)
2022	Serbia U18	3	(0)
2024–2026	Serbia U21	4	(0)
2026–	Serbia	2	(0)
- * Club domestic league appearances and goals as of 3 June 2026 ‡ National team caps and goals as of 22:00, 13 November 2026 (UTC)

Stefan Džodić (Serbian Cyrillic: Стефан Џодић; born 15 March 2005) is a professional footballer who plays as a midfielder for Segunda División club Almería. Born in France, he is a Serbia international.

== Club career ==
=== Montpellier ===
Džodić is a youth product of Montpellier since the age of 4, and began his senior career with their reserves in 2022. He made his senior and professional debut with Montpellier in a 3–0 Ligue 1 loss to Rennes on 15 September 2024.

=== Almería ===
On 13 July 2025, Džodić moved abroad for the first time in his career, signing a five-year contract with Spanish Segunda División side Almería.

== International career ==
Born in France, Džodić is of Serbian descent. He was part of the Serbia U17s for the 2022 UEFA European Under-17 Championship. He was called up to the Serbia U21s for a set of 2025 UEFA European Under-21 Championship qualification matches in September 2024.

On 1 October 2026, Džodić made his debut for the Serbia national team in a 2026–27 UEFA Nations League A game against Germany.

== Personal life ==
Stefan is the son of the Serbian former footballer Nenad Džodić and brother of the footballer Viktor Džodić.

== Career statistics ==
As of match played 17 May 2025

Appearances and goals by club, season and competition
Club	Season	League			National Cup		Other		Total	
Club	Season	Division	Apps	Goals	Apps	Goals	Apps	Goals	Apps	Goals
Montpellier B	2022–23	National 3	3	0	—		—		3	0
Montpellier B	2024–25	National 3	5	0	—		—		5	0
Montpellier B	Total		8	0	—		—		8	0
Montpellier	2024–25	Ligue 1	7	0	1	0	—		8	0
Career total			15	0	1	0	0	0	16	0

=== International ===
As of 13 November 2026

Appearances and goals by national team and year
National team	Year	Apps	Goals
Serbia	2026	2	0
Total		2	0
