= Miroslav Dujmović =

Bosnia and Herzegovina footballer

Personal information
- Date of birth: 19 October 1978 (age 48)
- Place of birth: Bihać, Bosnia and Herzegovina
- Height: 1.78 m (5 ft 10 in)
- Position: Striker

Senior career*
Years	Team	Apps	(Gls)
1999-2002	NK Dinamo Zagreb	5	(0)
2002	Hrvatski Dragovoljac	1	(0)
2002–2005	Široki Brijeg	50	(17)
2005–2006	Jedinstvo Bihać	17	(3)
2006–2007	SK St. Andrä		
2007–2009	Jedinstvo Bihać	15	(3)
2009–2013	Krajišnik Velika Kladuša		

International career
2001	Bosnia and Herzegovina	1	(1)
- * Club domestic league appearances and goals

Miroslav Dujmović (born 19 October 1978) is a Bosnian-Herzegovinian retired footballer.

== International career ==
He made his debut for Bosnia and Herzegovina in a July 2001 friendly match against Iran, in which he scored a goal. It remained his sole international appearance.

=== International goals ===
Scores and results list Bosnia and Herzegovina's goal tally first.

Goal	Date	Venue	Opponent	Score	Result	Competition
1.	22 July 2001	Stadion pod Borićima, Bihać, Bosnia and Herzegovina	Iran	1–0	2–2	Friendly
