= Yuri Dyadyuk =

Russian footballer and coach

Personal information
- Full name: Yuri Stepanovich Dyadyuk
- Date of birth: 13 March 1970 (age 56)
- Place of birth: Taganrog, Russia
- Height: 1.80 m (5 ft 11 in)
- Positions: Defender; midfielder

Team information
- Current team: FC Rostov (U-21 analyst)

Senior career*
Years	Team	Apps	(Gls)
1987–1989	FC Torpedo Taganrog	92	(5)
1990–1991	FC SKA Rostov-on-Don	77	(5)
1992–1999	FC Rostselmash Rostov-on-Don	204	(4)
1999–2000	FC Rostselmash-2 Rostov-on-Don	4	(0)
2001	FC Lokomotiv Nizhny Novgorod	5	(0)
2002	FC Irtysh Omsk	25	(0)
2003	FC Mashuk-KMV Pyatigorsk	35	(7)
2005	FC Alternativa Rostov-on-Don		

Managerial career
- 2009–2017: FC Rostov (academy)
- 2017–: FC Rostov (U-21 analyst)
- * Club domestic league appearances and goals

Yuri Stepanovich Dyadyuk (Russian: Юрий Степанович Дядюк; born 13 March 1970) is a Russian professional football coach and a former player. He works as an analyst for the Under-21 squad of FC Rostov.

== Playing career ==
He made his professional debut in the Soviet Second League in 1987 for FC Torpedo Taganrog. He played 5 games and scored 1 goal in the UEFA Intertoto Cup 1999 for FC Rostselmash Rostov-on-Don.
