= Imre Aranyos =

Hungarian footballer (born 1966)

Personal information
- Date of birth: 13 June 1966 (age 60)
- Place of birth: Hungary
- Position: Midfielder

Senior career*
Years	Team	Apps	(Gls)
1985	Eger SC	1	(0)
1992–1995	Vác FC-Samsung	80	(2)
1995–1996	Budapesti VSC	27	(2)
1996	Ferencváros	4	(0)
1996–2001	Vasas SC	128	(7)
2001–2002	Kispest–Honvéd	19	(1)
	Vasas SC	12	(2)
Total		271	(14)

International career
1996–1997	Hungary	3	(0)
- * Club domestic league appearances and goals

Imre Aranyos (born 13 June 1966) is a Hungarian former professional footballer who played as a midfielder. He gained three caps for Hungary and was a member of 1993–94 Vác FC-Samsung squad that won Nemzeti Bajnokság I and became Hungarian champion first and up to date the last time in the club's history.

== Club career ==
=== Eger SC ===
Aranyos made his first league debut in 1985 at the age of 19 for Eger SC, the team of a historical city of Eger, famous about the Siege of Eger (1552) and the novel Eclipse of the Crescent Moon (Hungarian: Egri Csillagok). The manager of the team was János Csank, who later worked and became Hungarian champions together with Aranyos in Vác.

=== Vác FC-Samsung ===
Following his top-flight debut at young-age Aranyos had to wait seven years to play again in Nemzeti Bajnokság I. In 1992 Vác FC-Samsung signed him where the manager was his ex-coach János Csank. Aranyos became runner-up in the league in his first season (1992–93) then Hungarian champion in the 1993–94 season. He also reached the final of Magyar Kupa (Hungarian Cup) with Vác FC, although they lost against Ferencváros. During his years at Vác FC, the team competed in the UEFA Cup and UEFA Champions League qualifiers. The biggest clubs that Aranyos played against were Benfica, and Paris Saint-Germain.

=== Budapesti VSC ===
In 1995 Aranyos left Vác FC-Samsung and joined Budapesti VSC. He spent one season at the club which traditionally was the team of Hungarian State Railways and at the end of the season they finished second which makes this year the best season of BVSC's history up to date. They played their most important game of the season against Ferencvárosi TC, in Népstadion ("People`s Stadium", later renamed to Ferenc Puskás Stadium) in front of an attendance of 45,000 fans. The game was played only two rounds before the end of the season, Ferencváros won 1–0.

=== Ferencváros ===
In the summer of 1996, reigning Hungarian champions Ferencvárosi TC signed Aranyos hoping to qualify again to the UEFA Champions League's group stage following the successful campaign of the previous season. IFK Göteborg knocked out Ferencváros in the qualification round (3–0; 1–1), Aranyos played on both games. Beyond the two UEFA CL qualifiers he played only four league games and three games in the Magyar Kupa against lower league teams for Ferencváros before he left the club and joined Vasas SC for the rest of the season.

=== Vasas SC ===
From 1996 to 2001 Aranyos spent five years at Vasas SC, played 128 league games and scored seven goals. During his time at the club, Vasas finished third in the league three times, 1997–98, 1999–2000 (in this season the top flight of Hungarian football was called Professzionális Nemzeti Bajnokság - Professional National League) and 2000–01.

=== Kispest-Honvéd ===
At the beginning of the 2001–02 season, Aranyos left Vasas SC and joined Kispest-Honvéd FC, where he played 19 games and scored one goal before he returned to Vasas for the second part of the season. He played another 12 games for Vasas and scored two goals in his last top flight season.

=== Later career ===
Aranyos played a few more seasons on professional level for FC Dabas and JázberényiI SE in the second tier of Hungarian football, Nemzeti Bajnokság II, then continued his career in lower leagues, where he was active until 2018, the age of 52. He worked as a player-coach for some of his amateur teams. Hungarian sports daily Nemzeti Sport reported multiple times about his role in amateur football. Hátsó Füves: Aranyos Imre, Berkenye királya - NSOEdzősors: a volt válogatottat menesztették a Budakalásztól - NSO

== International career ==
Aranyos was capped three times for Hungary. He made his debut against England in the old Wembley Stadium in 1996 then played two more games for his country against Italy and Australia. He did not score for Hungary.
