= Viktor Džodić =

Serbian footballer (born 2005)

Personal information
- Date of birth: 15 November 2006 (age 19)
- Place of birth: Montpellier, France
- Height: 1.86 m (6 ft 1 in)
- Position: Goalkeeper

Team information
- Current team: Montpellier
- Number: 50

Youth career
- 2012–2024: Montpellier

Senior career*
Years	Team	Apps	(Gls)
2024–	Montpellier II	27	(0)
2025–	Montpellier	2	(0)

International career^{‡}
2021–2022	Serbia U16	4	(0)
2022–2023	Serbia U17	11	(0)
2023	Serbia U18	1	(0)
2024	Serbia U19	3	(0)
- * Club domestic league appearances and goals as of 11 May 2026 ‡ National team caps and goals as of 21:17, 31 May 2025 (UTC)

Viktor Džodić (Serbian Cyrillic: Виктор Џодић; born 15 November 2006) is a professional footballer who plays as a goalkeeper for Ligue 2 club Montpellier. Born in France, he is a youth international for Serbia.

== Club career ==
Džodić is a pure youth product of Montpellier's youth academy. He made his senior and professional debut with Montpellier in a 1–1 Ligue 2 tie with Red Star FC on 9 August 2025.

== International career ==
Born in France, Džodić is of Serbian descent and holds dual French-Serbian citizenship. He was part of the Serbia U17s for the 2023 UEFA European Under-17 Championship. In March 2025, he was called up to the Serbia U19s.

== Personal life ==
Stefan is the son of the Serbian former footballer Nenad Džodić, and brother of Stefan Džodić.
