= 1999 Finnish Cup =

1999 Suomen Cup
Tournament details
- Country: Finland

The 1999 Finnish Cup (Finnish: Suomen Cup) was the 45th season of the main annual association football cup competition in Finland. It was organised as a single-elimination knock–out tournament and participation in the competition was voluntary. The final was held at the Olympic Stadium, Helsinki on 30 October 1999 with FC Jokerit defeating FF Jaro by 2-1 before an attendance of 3,217 spectators.

== Early rounds ==
Not currently available.

== Round 7 ==
Tie no	Home team	Score	Away team	Information
1	Honka Espoo	1-4	MyPa Anjalankoski	
2	Jaro Pietarsaari	4-0	RoPS Rovaniemi	
3	Jazz Pori	2-1	VPS Vaasa	
4	TPS Turku	2-1	KTP Kotka	

Tie no	Home team	Score	Away team	Information
5	FC Mikkeli	1-2	FC Lahti	
6	Rakuunat Lappeenranta	1-2	Jokerit Helsinki	
7	United Tampere	2-0	Haka Valkeakoski	
8	FinnPa Helsinki	1-3	HJK Helsinki	

== Quarter-finals ==
Tie no	Home team	Score	Away team	Information
1	Jokerit Helsinki	2-1	FC Lahti	
2	United Tampere	1-5	MyPa Anjalankoski	

Tie no	Home team	Score	Away team	Information
3	Jazz Pori	0-2	Jaro Pietarsaari	
4	TPS Turku	2-2; 1-3 (p.)	HJK Helsinki	

== Semi-finals ==
Tie no	Home team	Score	Away team	Information
1	MyPa Anjalankoski	0-1	Jaro Pietarsaari	

Tie no	Home team	Score	Away team	Information
2	Jokerit Helsinki	1-0	HJK Helsinki	

== Final ==
Tie no	Team 1	Score	Team 2	Information
1	Jokerit Helsinki	2-1	Jaro Pietarsaari	Att. 3,217
