= Richard Buhagiar =

Maltese footballer

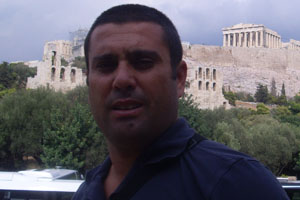

Personal information
- Date of birth: 17 March 1972 (age 54)
- Place of birth: New South Wales, Australia
- Height: 1.78 m (5 ft 10 in)
- Position: Defender

Youth career
- Mosta

Senior career*
Years	Team	Apps	(Gls)
1988–1990	Mosta	40	(1)
1990–2001	Floriana	159	(51)
2001–2002	Sliema Wanderers	21	(3)
2002–2004	Marsaxlokk	56	(6)
2005	Għajnsielem	12	(3)
Total		288	(64)

International career^{‡}
- Malta U21
1991–2004	Malta	55	(0)
- * Club domestic league appearances and goals as of 18 January 2010 ‡ National team caps and goals as of 16 March 2024

Richard Buhagiar (born 17 March 1972) is a retired footballer. Born in Australia, he represented the Malta national team. During his career, he played as a defender for Floriana, Sliema Wanderers, Marsaxlokk and Għajnsielem.

== International career ==
Buhagiar made his debut for Malta in a June 1991 friendly match against Indonesia, coming on as a 46th-minute substitute for Clyde Whitehead, and earned a total of 55 caps, scoring no goals. His final international was a March 2004 friendly match against Finland.

== Honours ==
Floriana

- Maltese Premier League: 1

1993

- FA Trophy: 2

1993, 1994

Għajnsielem

- Gozo Football League First Division: 1

2005
