= FC Jokerit =

Former Finnish football club (1999–2004)

- Founded: 1999
- Dissolved: 2004
- Ground: Sonera Stadium, Helsinki
- Capacity: 10,770
Home colours	Away colours

FC Jokerit was a Finnish professional football club based in Helsinki, Finland.

== History ==
FC Jokerit was founded in 1999. The club was known for its wild supporters, 116% Boys, and for its owner, Hjallis Harkimo who was also the owner of Jokerit, an ice hockey club based in Helsinki.

FC Jokerit's last season of football was in 2003, finishing 10th in Veikkausliiga. The club was sold to rivals HJK Helsinki in March 2004, renamed to Klubi 04 and established in Kakkonen.

Former member of the Parliament of Finland and current member of the Helsinki city council Paavo Arhinmäki was an active supporter of the club, and has been a member of the 116% boys.

=== Reformation ===
Jokerit F.C. Helsinki were formed as a supporters' phoenix club in 2012 and in 2026 compete in the Finnish Fourth Division, Nelonen. Because of the sale and reformation of the original Jokerit, Jokerit FC consider HJK Helsinki and Klubi 04 as rivals, despite the fact that they rarely play each other due to the divisions between them.

== Managers ==
Manager	Tenure	Nationality
Pasi Rautiainen	1999–2000, 2003–2004	Finland
Jan Everse	2001	Netherlands
Ville Lyytikainen	2001–2002	Finland

== Achievements ==
Cup	Year	Position/ Stage Achieved
Finnish Cup	1999	Champions
Veikkausliiga	2000	Second place
Ykkönen	2002	Champions
UEFA Intertoto Cup	1999	Third round
