= 2008–09 UEFA Cup qualifying rounds =

The qualifying rounds for the 2008–09 UEFA Cup began on 17 July 2008. In total, there were two qualifying rounds which narrowed clubs down to 80 teams in preparation for the first round.

Times are CEST (UTC+2), as listed by UEFA.

== First qualifying round ==
=== Summary ===
The draw for the first qualifying round took place on 1 July 2008. The first legs were played on 17 July 2008 and the second legs were played on 29 and 31 July 2008.

In each region of the draw for the first qualifying round, teams were divided into two pots, on the basis of UEFA coefficients. The lower pots contained unranked teams from associations 34–53, together with Vėtra of Lithuania (the 33rd association). The higher pots contained teams from associations 1–32, together with Sūduva of Lithuania, and FH (who had a team ranking, 209). Three of the 37 ties were won by the team with the lower UEFA coefficient, all involving teams whose ranking was that of their association: WIT Georgia (Georgia, ranked 38) beat Spartak Trnava (Slovakia, 24); Vllaznia (Albania, 43) beat Koper (Slovenia, 29); and St Patrick's Athletic (Ireland, 35) beat Olimps/ASK (Latvia, 31).

Team 1	Agg.	Team 2	1st leg	2nd leg
Southern region
Cherno More (Bulgaria)	9–0	(Andorra) Sant Julià	4–0	5–0
Pelister (North Macedonia)	0–1	(Cyprus) APOEL	0–0	0–1
Vaduz (Liechtenstein)	1–5	(Bosnia and Herzegovina) Zrinjski Mostar	1–2	0–3
Široki Brijeg (Bosnia and Herzegovina)	3–1	(Albania) Partizani	0–0	3–1
Ironi Kiryat Shmona (Israel)	4–1	(Montenegro) Mogren	1–1	3–0
Koper (Slovenia)	1–2	(Albania) Vllaznia	1–2	0–0
Zeta (Montenegro)	1–2	(Slovenia) Interblock	1–1	0–1
Hapoel Tel Aviv (Israel)	5–0	(San Marino) Juvenes/Dogana	3–0	2–0
Hajduk Split (Croatia)	7–0	(Malta) Birkirkara	4–0	3–0
Omonia (Cyprus)	4–1	(North Macedonia) Milano	2–0	2–1
Marsaxlokk (Malta)	0–8	(Croatia) Slaven Belupo	0–4	0–4
Central–East region
Red Bull Salzburg (Austria)	10–0	(Armenia) Banants	7–0	3–0
Győri ETO (Hungary)	3–2	(Georgia (country)) Zestaponi	1–1	2–1
Ararat Yerevan (Armenia)	1–4	(Switzerland) Bellinzona	0–1	1–3
Dacia Chișinău (Moldova)	2–4	(Serbia) Borac Čačak	1–1	1–3
Tobol (Kazakhstan)	1–2	Austria Wien	1–0	0–2
Hertha BSC (Germany)	8–1	(Moldova) Nistru Otaci	8–1	0–0
Khazar Lankaran (Azerbaijan)	1–5	(Poland) Lech Poznań	0–1	1–4
Legia Warsaw (Poland)	4–1	(Belarus) Gomel	0–0	4–1
Spartak Trnava (Slovakia)	2–3	(Georgia (country)) WIT Georgia	2–2	0–1
MTZ-RIPO Minsk (Belarus)	2–3	(Slovakia) Žilina	2–2	0–1
Shakhter Karagandy (Kazakhstan)	1–2	(Hungary) Debrecen	1–1	0–1
Vojvodina (Serbia)	2–1	(Azerbaijan) Olimpik Baku	1–0	1–1
Northern region
FH (Iceland)	8–3	(Luxembourg) Grevenmacher	3–2	5–1
Vėtra (Lithuania)	1–2	(Norway) Viking	1–0	0–2
Racing Union (Luxembourg)	1–10	(Sweden) Kalmar FF	0–3	1–7
Honka (Finland)	4–2	(Iceland) ÍA	3–0	1–2
Glentoran (Northern Ireland)	1–3	(Latvia) Liepājas Metalurgs	1–1	0–2
Brøndby (Denmark)	3–0	(Faroe Islands) B36	1–0	2–0
TVMK (Estonia)	0–8	(Denmark) Nordsjælland	0–3	0–5
EB/Streymur (Faroe Islands)	0–4	(England) Manchester City	0–2	0–2
Olimps/ASK (Latvia)	0–3	(Republic of Ireland) St Patrick's Athletic	0–1	0–2
Djurgårdens IF (Sweden)	2–2 (a)	(Estonia) Flora	0–0	2–2
Sūduva (Lithuania)	2–0	(Wales) The New Saints	1–0	1–0
Cliftonville (Northern Ireland)	0–11	(Denmark) Copenhagen	0–4	0–7
Cork City (Republic of Ireland)	2–6	(Finland) Haka	2–2	0–4
Bangor City (Wales)	1–10 (Note: Midtjylland were originally drawn to play at home in the first leg, but the order of the games was reversed.)	(Denmark) Midtjylland	0–4	1–6

=== Southern region matches ===
17 July 2008
19:30

Cherno More (Bulgaria)	4–0	(Andorra) Sant Julià
Alex 84', 90+1'; Manolov 88'; Bachev 90+3'	Report

Vasil Levski National Stadium, Sofia
Attendance: 756
Referee: Radek Příhoda (Czech Republic)
31 July 2008
20:30

Sant Julià (Andorra)	0–5	(Bulgaria) Cherno More
	Report	Varela 22' (o.g.); Yurukov 39'; Manolov 41', 50'; Andonov 64'

Estadi Comunal, Andorra la Vella
Attendance: 100
Referee: Albano Janku (Albania)

Cherno More won 9–0 on aggregate.

17 July 2008
18:00

Pelister (North Macedonia)	0–0	(Cyprus) APOEL
	Report

Gradski Stadium, Skopje
Attendance: 2,500
Referee: Ovidiu Alin Hategan (Romania)
31 July 2008
19:00

APOEL (Cyprus)	1–0	(North Macedonia) Pelister
Michail 82' (pen.)	Report

GSP Stadium, Nicosia
Attendance: 10,101
Referee: Gianluca Rocchi (Italy)

APOEL won 1–0 on aggregate.

17 July 2008
20:00

Vaduz (Liechtenstein)	1–2	(Bosnia and Herzegovina) Zrinjski Mostar
Fischer 32'	Report	Đurić 23'; Iten 90' (o.g.)

Rheinpark Stadion, Vaduz
Attendance: 720
Referee: Gediminas Mažeika (Lithuania)
31 July 2008
20:30

Zrinjski Mostar (Bosnia and Herzegovina)	3–0	(Liechtenstein) Vaduz
Đurić 7'; Šunjić 26'; Matko 77'	Report

Bijeli Brijeg Stadium, Mostar
Attendance: 2,500
Referee: Igor Zakharov (Russia)

Zrinjski Mostar won 5–1 on aggregate.

17 July 2008
20:15

Široki Brijeg (Bosnia and Herzegovina)	0–0	(Albania) Partizani
	Report

Pecara Stadium, Široki Brijeg
Attendance: 3,500
Referee: Pavel Olsiak (Slovakia)
31 July 2008
20:00

Partizani (Albania)	1–3	(Bosnia and Herzegovina) Široki Brijeg
Muzaka 39' (pen.)	Report	Ala do Carmo 10', 44'; Šilić 84'

Qemal Stafa, Tirana
Attendance: 1,650
Referee: Bas Nijhuis (Netherlands)

Široki Brijeg won 3–1 on aggregate.

17 July 2008
18:00

Ironi Kiryat Shmona (Israel)	1–1	(Montenegro) Mogren
Peretz 18'	Report	Nerić 82'

Kiryat Eliezer Stadium, Haifa
Attendance: 882
Referee: Bülent Yıldırım (Turkey)
31 July 2008
17:30

Mogren (Montenegro)	0–3	(Israel) Ironi Kiryat Shmona
	Report	Nussbaum 32'; Peretz 53'; Tzarfati 68'

Gradski stadion, Nikšić
Attendance: 2,800
Referee: Michael Svendsen (Denmark)

Ironi Kiryat Shmona won 4–1 on aggregate.

17 July 2008
20:30

Koper (Slovenia)	1–2	(Albania) Vllaznia
Viler 69'	Report	Sukaj 7', 45'

Stadion Športni Park, Nova Gorica
Attendance: 716
Referee: Alexey Kulbakov (Belarus)
31 July 2008
20:00

Vllaznia (Albania)	0–0	(Slovenia) Koper
	Report

Loro-Boriçi Stadium, Shkodër
Attendance: 5,375
Referee: Anthony Buttimer (Republic of Ireland)

Vllaznia won 2–1 on aggregate.

17 July 2008
20:30

Zeta (Montenegro)	1–1	(Slovenia) Interblock
Knežević 28'	Report	Jolić 90+1'

Podgorica City Stadium, Podgorica
Attendance: 1,300
Referee: Ghennadi Sidenco (Moldova)
31 July 2008
20:45

Interblock (Slovenia)	1–0	(Montenegro) Zeta
Zahora 83'	Report

Arena Petrol, Celje
Attendance: 800
Referee: George Vadachkoria (Georgia)

Interblock won 2–1 on aggregate.

17 July 2008
18:00

Hapoel Tel Aviv (Israel)	3–0	(San Marino) Juvenes/Dogana
Srur 16', 32'; Antebi 26'	Report

Haberfeld Stadium, Rishon LeZion
Attendance: 2,040
Referee: Rusmir Mrkovic (Bosnia and Herzegovina)
31 July 2008
20:30

Juvenes/Dogana (San Marino)	0–2	(Israel) Hapoel Tel Aviv
	Report	Antebi 5'; da Silva 8'

Stadio Olimpico, Serravalle
Attendance: 776
Referee: Csaba Sapi (Hungary)

Hapoel Tel Aviv won 5–0 on aggregate.

17 July 2008
21:00

Hajduk Split (Croatia)	4–0	(Malta) Birkirkara
Ibričić 3'; Kalinić 24'; Bušić 55'; Tičinović 71'	Report

Poljud, Split
Attendance: 14,500
Referee: Carlo Bertolini (Switzerland)
31 July 2008
18:00

Birkirkara (Malta)	0–3	(Croatia) Hajduk Split
	Report	Strinić 5'; Bartolović 45'; Ibričić 90+2'

Ta' Qali National Stadium, Ta' Qali
Attendance: 964
Referee: David McKeon (Republic of Ireland)

Hajduk Split won 7–0 on aggregate.

17 July 2008
19:00

Omonia (Cyprus)	2–0	(North Macedonia) Milano
Kukaj 19'; Žlogar 64'	Report

GSP Stadium, Nicosia
Attendance: 15,108
Referee: Antonio Rubinos Perez (Spain)
31 July 2008
17:00

Milano (North Macedonia)	1–2	(Cyprus) Omonia
Statovci 17'	Report	Christofi 78'; Cafú 85'

Milano Arena, Kumanovo
Attendance: 800
Referee: Jorge Sousa (Portugal)

Omonia won 4–1 on aggregate.

17 July 2008
20:00

Marsaxlokk (Malta)	0–4	(Croatia) Slaven Belupo
	Report	Kristić 15'; Poldrugač 29'; Tepurić 34'; Vručina 78'

Ta' Qali Stadium, Ta' Qali
Attendance: 540
Referee: Jan Jilek (Czech Republic)
31 July 2008
20:15

Slaven Belupo (Croatia)	4–0	(Malta) Marsaxlokk
Bilen 25'; Čaval 72'; Vručina 74', 90+1'	Report

Gradski stadion u Koprivnici, Koprivnica
Attendance: 1,800
Referee: Vusal Aliyev (Azerbaijan)

Slaven Belupo won 8–0 on aggregate.

=== Central–East region matches ===
17 July 2008
20:30

Red Bull Salzburg (Austria)	7–0	(Armenia) Banants
Tchoyi 22', 38'; Ngwat-Mahop 28', 46'; Zickler 34' (pen.), 65'; Öbster 48'	Report

Red Bull Arena, Salzburg
Attendance: 7,100
Referee: Sokol Jareci (Albania)
31 July 2008
16:00

Banants (Armenia)	0–3	(Austria) Red Bull Salzburg
	Report	Nelisse 55'; Ilić 60'; Öbster 68'

Abovyan City Stadium, Abovyan
Attendance: 1,500
Referee: Marijo Strahonja (Croatia)

Red Bull Salzburg won 10–0 on aggregate.

17 July 2008
20:00

Győri ETO (Hungary)	1–1	(Georgia (country)) Zestaponi
Böőr 58'	Report	Supić 45' (o.g.)

Stadion ETO, Győr
Attendance: 4,010
Referee: Angel Angelov (Bulgaria)
31 July 2008
15:00

Zestaponi (Georgia (country))	1–2	(Hungary) Győri ETO
Gotsiridze 51'	Report	Jäkl 52'; Pákolicz 66'

Municipal Stadium, Zestaponi
Attendance: 3,600
Referee: Anastassios Kakos (Greece)

Győri ETO won 3–2 on aggregate.

17 July 2008
16:00

Ararat Yerevan (Armenia)	0–1	(Switzerland) Bellinzona
	Report	Mangiarratti 21'

Abovyan City Stadium, Abovyan
Attendance: 2,800
Referee: Philippe Kalt (France)
31 July 2008
20:15

Bellinzona (Switzerland)	3–1	(Armenia) Ararat Yerevan
Rivera 22'; Sermeter 31'; Roux 45'	Report	Mkoyan 53'

Cornaredo Stadium, Lugano (Note: Played in Lugano at Cornaredo Stadium as Bellinzona's Stadio Comunale Bellinzona did not meet UEFA criteria.)
Attendance: 3,137
Referee: Haim Jakov (Israel)

Bellinzona won 4–1 on aggregate.

17 July 2008
19:00

Dacia Chișinău (Moldova)	1–1	(Serbia) Borac Čačak
Bulat 50'	Report	Stojanović 84' (pen.)

Dinamo Stadium, Chișinău
Attendance: 3,000
Referee: Mihaly Fabian (Hungary)
31 July 2008
16:30

Borac Čačak (Serbia)	3–1	(Moldova) Dacia Chișinău
Lazović 17'; Kocić 57'; Grkajac 82'	Report	Korgalidze 3'

Fortress Stadium, Smederevo (Note: Played in Smederevo at Fortress Stadium as Borac Čačak's home ground did not meet UEFA criteria.)
Attendance: 1,500
Referee: Babak Guliyev (Azerbaijan)

Borac Čačak won 4–2 on aggregate.

17 July 2008
17:00

Tobol (Kazakhstan)	1–0	Austria Wien
Golban 59'	Report

Kostanay Central Stadium, Kostanay
Attendance: 8,000
Referee: Andriy Shandor (Ukraine)
31 July 2008
20:30

Austria Wien	2–0	(Kazakhstan) Tobol
Ačimovič 28' (pen.); Krammer 52'	Report

Franz Horr Stadium, Vienna
Attendance: 6,404
Referee: Carlos Xistra (Portugal)

Austria Wien won 2–1 on aggregate.

17 July 2008
20:15

Hertha BSC (Germany)	8–1	(Moldova) Nistru Otaci
Pantelić 15'; Raffael 23', 71'; Piszczek 34', 40', 80'; Kačar 38'; Stein 68'	Report	Tcaciuc 78'

Friedrich Ludwig Jahn Sportpark, Berlin (Note: Matches played at Friedrich Ludwig Jahn Sportpark because Hertha BSC's usual home ground, Olympiastadion, was occupied with other events.)
Attendance: 12,373
Referee: Richard Liesveld (Netherlands)
31 July 2008
18:00

Nistru Otaci (Moldova)	0–0	(Germany) Hertha BSC
	Report

Zimbru Stadium, Chișinău (Note: Played in Chişinău at Zimbru Stadium as Nistru Otaci's home ground did not meet UEFA criteria.)
Attendance: 1,405
Referee: Anders Hermansen (Denmark)

Hertha BSC won 8–1 on aggregate.

17 July 2008
18:00

Khazar Lankaran (Azerbaijan)	0–1	(Poland) Lech Poznań
	Report	Lewandowski 75'

Tofik Bakhramov Stadium, Baku
Attendance: 28,800
Referee: Calum Murray (Scotland)
31 July 2008
20:45

Lech Poznań (Poland)	4–1	(Azerbaijan) Khazar Lankaran
Štilić 35'; Murawski 52'; Injac 64'; Reiss 82'	Report	Ramazanov 45'

Stadion Miejski, Poznań
Attendance: 12,819
Referee: Meir Levi (Israel)

Lech Poznań won 5–1 on aggregate.

17 July 2008
20:45

Legia Warsaw (Poland)	0–0	(Belarus) Gomel
	Report

Polish Army Stadium, Warsaw
Attendance: 4,500
Referee: Fırat Aydınus (Turkey)
31 July 2008
18:00

Gomel (Belarus)	1–4	(Poland) Legia Warsaw
Bressan 20'	Report	Iwański 26' (pen.), 62'; Szałachowski 52', 66'

Central Stadion, Gomel
Attendance: 4,185
Referee: Daniel Stålhammar (Sweden)

Legia Warsaw won 4–1 on aggregate.

17 July 2008
20:15

Spartak Trnava (Slovakia)	2–2	(Georgia (country)) WIT Georgia
Kožuch 75', 90+1'	Report	Lomaia 14'; Razmadze 43' (pen.)

Štadión Antona Malatinského, Trnava
Attendance: 4,950
Referee: Johannes Valgeirsson (Iceland)
31 July 2008
15:30

WIT Georgia (Georgia (country))	1–0	(Slovakia) Spartak Trnava
Razmadze 90+1'	Report

Mikheil Meskhi Stadium, Tbilisi
Attendance: 1,500
Referee: Stanislav Todorov (Bulgaria)

WIT Georgia won 3–2 on aggregate.

17 July 2008
17:00

MTZ-RIPO Minsk (Belarus)	2–2	(Slovakia) Žilina
Camara 17'; Ceolin 52' (pen.)	Report	Vladavić 41'; Jež 90+6' (pen.)

Traktor Stadium, Minsk
Attendance: 5,300
Referee: Sinisa Zrnic (Bosnia and Herzegovina)
31 July 2008
19:30

Žilina (Slovakia)	1–0	(Belarus) MTZ-RIPO Minsk
Jež 90'	Report

Stadium Pod Dubňom, Žilina
Attendance: 5,385
Referee: Michael Koukoulakis (Greece)

Žilina won 3–2 on aggregate.

17 July 2008
15:00

Shakhter Karagandy (Kazakhstan)	1–1	(Hungary) Debrecen
Peric 63'	Report	Rudolf 61'

Shakhtyor Stadium, Karagandy
Attendance: 10,050
Referee: Hüseyin Göçek (Turkey)
31 July 2008
20:00

Debrecen (Hungary)	1–0	(Kazakhstan) Shakhter Karagandy
Rudolf 38'	Report

Stadion Oláh Gábor Út, Debrecen
Attendance: 4,900
Referee: Lars Christoffersen (Denmark)

Debrecen won 2–1 on aggregate.

17 July 2008
18:00

Vojvodina (Serbia)	1–0	(Azerbaijan) Olimpik Baku
Đurić 59'	Report

Karađorđe Stadium, Novi Sad
Attendance: 4,000
Referee: Mark Whitby (Wales)
31 July 2008
16:00

Olimpik Baku (Azerbaijan)	1–1	(Serbia) Vojvodina
Akhalkatsi 49'	Report	Đurić 86'

Tofik Bakhramov Stadium, Baku
Attendance: 8,000
Referee: Sandor Szabo (Hungary)

Vojvodina won 2–1 on aggregate.

=== Northern region matches ===
17 July 2008
21:15

FH (Iceland)	3–2	(Luxembourg) Grevenmacher
T.Guðmundsson 40' (pen.), 60'; A.Gunnlaugsson 50'	Report	Steinmetz 19'; Maric 25'

Kaplakriki, Hafnarfjörður
Attendance: 638
Referee: Richard Havrilla (Slovakia)
31 July 2008
20:00

Grevenmacher (Luxembourg)	1–5	(Iceland) FH
Hoffmann 30'	Report	Gudnason 13', 57'; T.Guðmundsson 65', 74'; Sverrisson 88'

Stade Josy Barthel, Luxembourg City
Attendance: 1,124
Referee: Igor Kister (Kazakhstan)

FH won 8–3 on aggregate.

17 July 2008
18:00

Vėtra (Lithuania)	1–0	(Norway) Viking
Ostap 14'	Report

Vėtra Stadium, Vilnius
Attendance: 1,500
Referee: Aleksandr Gvardis (Russia)
31 July 2008
18:00

Viking (Norway)	2–0	(Lithuania) Vėtra
Stokholm 3', 33' (pen.)	Report

Viking Stadion, Stavanger
Attendance: 5,650
Referee: Yuriy Moseychuk (Ukraine)

Viking won 2–1 on aggregate.

17 July 2008
19:30

Racing Union (Luxembourg)	0–3	(Sweden) Kalmar FF
	Report	Dauda 32', 79'; R.Elm 90+2'

Stade Josy Barthel, Luxembourg City
Attendance: 427
Referee: Dimitar Meckarovski (Macedonia)
31 July 2008
19:00

Kalmar FF (Sweden)	7–1	(Luxembourg) Racing Union
R.Elm 7'; Lindberg 9'; Israelsson 41'; Dauda 46'; Larsson 61'; Daniel Sobralense 65' (pen.), 68'	Report	Bilon 90'

Fredriksskans, Kalmar
Attendance: 2,034
Referee: Ian Stokes (Republic of Ireland)

Kalmar FF won 10–1 on aggregate.

17 July 2008
17:30

Honka (Finland)	3–0	(Iceland) ÍA
Koskela 25'; Heilala 29' (pen.); Otaru 55'	Report

ISS Stadion, Vantaa
Attendance: 2,372
Referee: Serhiy Berezka (Ukraine)
31 July 2008
20:00

ÍA (Iceland)	2–1	(Finland) Honka
Magnússon 15'; Sigurðarson 49'	Report	Vasara 72'

Akranesvöllur, Akranes
Attendance: 453
Referee: Hubert Siejewicz (Poland)

Honka won 4–2 on aggregate.

17 July 2008
20:45

Glentoran (Northern Ireland)	1–1	(Latvia) Liepājas Metalurgs
Halliday 29'	Report	Surņins 15'

The Oval, Belfast
Attendance: 1,850
Referee: Anthony Zammit (Malta)
31 July 2008
17:00

Liepājas Metalurgs (Latvia)	2–0	(Northern Ireland) Glentoran
Karlsons 36', 86'	Report

Daugava Stadium, Liepāja
Attendance: 2,800
Referee: Magnus Thorisson (Iceland)

Liepājas Metalurgs won 3–1 on aggregate.

17 July 2008
20:00

Brøndby (Denmark)	1–0	(Faroe Islands) B36
von Schlebrügge 50'	Report

Brøndby Stadium, Brøndbyvester
Attendance: 7,105
Referee: Christopher Lautier (Malta)
31 July 2008
19:30

B36 (Faroe Islands)	0–2	(Denmark) Brøndby
	Report	Wass 52'; Holmén 90+3'

Gundadalur Stadium, Tórshavn
Attendance: 1,600
Referee: Markus Strömbergsson (Sweden)

Brøndby won 3–0 on aggregate.

17 July 2008
17:30

TVMK (Estonia)	0–3	(Denmark) Nordsjælland
	Report	Lundberg 28'; Bernburg 49' (pen.), 87'

Kadrioru Stadium, Tallinn
Attendance: 310
Referee: Pol van Boekel (Netherlands)
29 July 2008
19:00

Nordsjælland (Denmark)	5–0	(Estonia) TVMK
Bernier 5'; Bernburg 53' (pen.), 54'; Dahl 66'; Pode 89'	Report

Farum Park, Farum
Attendance: 2,518
Referee: Libor Kovarik (Czech Republic)

Nordsjælland won 8–0 on aggregate.

17 July 2008
20:00

EB/Streymur (Faroe Islands)	0–2	(England) Manchester City
	Report	Petrov 9'; Hamann 28'

Tórsvøllur, Tórshavn (Note: Played at Tórsvøllur as EB/Streymur's home ground did not meet UEFA criteria.)
Attendance: 5,400
Referee: Nicole Petignat (Switzerland)
31 July 2008
21:00

Manchester City (England)	2–0	(Faroe Islands) EB/Streymur
Petrov 48'; Vassell 90+1'	Report

Oakwell, Barnsley (Note: Manchester City played their home game at Oakwell Stadium, home of Barnsley, because the pitch at their home ground needed to be relaid after a Bon Jovi concert.)
Attendance: 7,334
Referee: Augustus Viorel Constanti (Romania)

Manchester City won 4–0 on aggregate.

17 July 2008
17:00

Olimps/ASK (Latvia)	0–1	(Republic of Ireland) St Patrick's Athletic
	Report	Guy 76'

Skonto Stadium, Riga
Attendance: 2,200
Referee: Ararat Tshagharyan (Armenia)
31 July 2008
20:45

St Patrick's Athletic (Republic of Ireland)	2–0	(Latvia) Olimps/ASK
Harris 41'; Quigley 71' (pen.)	Report

Richmond Park, Dublin
Attendance: 2,200
Referee: Marco Borg (Malta)

St Patrick's Athletic won 3–0 on aggregate.

17 July 2008
19:00

Djurgårdens IF (Sweden)	0–0	(Estonia) Flora
	Report

Råsunda Stadium, Solna (Note: Played at Råsunda Stadium as Djurgårdens IF's home ground did not meet UEFA criteria.)
Attendance: 5,381
Referee: Luc Wilmes (Luxembourg)
31 July 2008
17:45

Flora (Estonia)	2–2	(Sweden) Djurgårdens IF
Post 81', 82'	Report	Enrico 24'; Ekong 55'

A. Le Coq Arena, Tallinn
Attendance: 2,200
Referee: Lasha Silagava (Georgia)

2–2 on aggregate; Djurgårdens IF won on away goals.

17 July 2008
18:00

Sūduva (Lithuania)	1–0	(Wales) The New Saints
Kozyuberda 88'	Report

Sūduva Stadium, Marijampolė
Attendance: 2,000
Referee: Jouni Hietala (Finland)
31 July 2008
19:45

The New Saints (Wales)	0–1	(Lithuania) Sūduva
	Report	Lukjanovs 85'

Latham Park, Newtown
Attendance: 879
Referee: Brage Sandmoen (Norway)

Sūduva won 2–0 on aggregate.

17 July 2008
20:45

Cliftonville (Northern Ireland)	0–4	(Denmark) Copenhagen
	Report	Nørregaard 22'; Júnior 67', 82'; Pospěch 77'

Mourneview Park, Lurgan
Attendance: 829
Referee: Hristo Ristoskov (Bulgaria)
31 July 2008
20:00

Copenhagen (Denmark)	7–0	(Northern Ireland) Cliftonville
Aílton 23'; Júnior 25', 60'; Hutchinson 45'; Kvist 46'; Nordstrand 55' (pen.); Kristensen 57'	Report

Parken Stadium, Copenhagen
Attendance: 10,695
Referee: Manuel Gräfe (Germany)

Copenhagen won 11–0 on aggregate.

17 July 2008
20:45

Cork City (Republic of Ireland)	2–2	(Finland) Haka
Mooney 64'; Murray 67'	Report	Mahlakaarto 17'; Lehtinen 52'

Turners Cross, Cork
Attendance: 3,791
Referee: Svein-Erik Edvartsen (Norway)
31 July 2008
20:45

Haka (Finland)	4–0	(Republic of Ireland) Cork City
Mahlakaarto 10'; Popovich 15'; Manninen 70'; Minkenen 78'	Report

Tehtaan kenttä, Valkeakoski
Attendance: 3,211
Referee: Romans Lajuks (Latvia)

Haka won 6–2 on aggregate.

17 July 2008
20:30

Bangor City (Wales)	1–6	(Denmark) Midtjylland
Davies 24'	Report	Florescu 19'; Reid 40'; Christensen 53', 58', 63'; Thygesen 71'

Racecourse Ground, Wrexham (Note: Bangor City's home leg was played at Wrexham's Racecourse Ground, as their own ground did not meet UEFA criteria.)
Attendance: 700
Referee: Pavle Radovanović (Montenegro)
31 July 2008
19:00

Midtjylland (Denmark)	4–0	(Wales) Bangor City
Nworuh 4', 36'; Sivebæk 57'; Babatunde 78'	Report

SAS Arena, Herning
Attendance: 4,069
Referee: Karen Nalbandyan (Armenia)

Midtjylland won 10–1 on aggregate.

== Second qualifying round ==
=== Summary ===
The draw for the second qualifying round was held on 1 August 2008 in Nyon, Switzerland, and featured 16 teams entering directly at the second qualifying round, as well as the 37 winners from the previous round and the 11 third round winners of the UEFA Intertoto Cup. The first legs were played on 14 August 2008 and the second leg on 28 August 2008.

In each region of the draw for the second qualifying round, teams were divided into two pots, on the basis of UEFA coefficients. The higher pots contained teams with a ranking of 176 or higher, and unranked teams from associations ranked 1 to 15 (or 17 in the Southern region). As there were an odd number of teams in the Central and Northern groups in the 2nd qualifying round, UEFA moved Rennes from the Central-East group to the Northern group. Furthermore, Liepājas Metalurgs and Sūduva were moved from the Northern group to the Central-East group, and Vaslui and Interblock were moved from the Southern-Mediterranean group to the Central-East group. 12 of the 32 ties were won by the team with the lower UEFA coefficient. The 12 teams that lost to a lower team were: AEK Athens, Dnipro Dnipropetrovsk, Aris, Red Star Belgrade, Grasshopper, Slovan Liberec, Viking, Lokomotiv Sofia, IF Elfsborg, Gent, Queen of the South and Debrecen. St Patrick's Athletic were the only team to beat a higher-seeded team in each of the two qualifying rounds.

Team 1	Agg.	Team 2	1st leg	2nd leg
Southern region
Široki Brijeg (Bosnia and Herzegovina)	1–6	(Turkey) Beşiktaş	1–2	0–4
Braga (Portugal)	3–0	(Bosnia and Herzegovina) Zrinjski Mostar	1–0	2–0
Borac Čačak (Serbia)	2–1	(Bulgaria) Lokomotiv Sofia	1–0	1–1
Vojvodina (Serbia)	0–3	(Israel) Hapoel Tel Aviv	0–0	0–3
Aris (Greece)	1–2	(Croatia) Slaven Belupo	1–0	0–2
Litex Lovech (Bulgaria)	2–1	(Israel) Ironi Kiryat Shmona	0–0	2–1
Deportivo La Coruña (Spain)	2–0	(Croatia) Hajduk Split	0–0	2–0
APOEL (Cyprus)	5–5 (a)	(Serbia) Red Star Belgrade	2–2	3–3 (a.e.t.)
Vllaznia (Albania)	0–8	(Italy) Napoli	0–3	0–5
Maccabi Netanya (Israel)	1–3	(Bulgaria) Cherno More	1–1	0–2
AEK Athens (Greece)	2–3 (Note: Order of legs reversed)	(Cyprus) Omonia	0–1	2–2
Central–East region
Liepājas Metalurgs (Latvia)	1–5	(Romania) Vaslui	0–2	1–3
Zürich (Switzerland)	2–2 (4–2 p)	(Austria) Sturm Graz	1–1	1–1 (a.e.t.)
VfB Stuttgart (Germany)	6–2	(Hungary) Győri ETO	2–1	4–1
Lech Poznań (Poland)	6–0	(Switzerland) Grasshopper	6–0	0–0
Slovan Liberec (Czech Republic)	2–4	(Slovakia) Žilina	1–2	1–2
WIT Georgia (Georgia (country))	0–2	Austria Wien	Canc. (Note: Due to the current conflict in Georgia and the ensuing safety concerns, UEFA ordered the first leg to be cancelled. The match was held as a single leg tie in Vienna.)	0–2
Young Boys (Switzerland)	7–3	(Hungary) Debrecen	4–1	3–2
Legia Warsaw (Poland)	1–4	(Russia) FC Moscow	1–2	0–2
Dnipro Dnipropetrovsk (Ukraine)	4–4 (a)	(Switzerland) Bellinzona	3–2	1–2
Interblock (Slovenia)	0–3	(Germany) Hertha BSC	0–2	0–1
Sūduva (Lithuania)	2–4	(Austria) Red Bull Salzburg	1–4	1–0
Northern region
Djurgårdens IF (Sweden)	2–6	(Norway) Rosenborg	2–1	0–5
Queen of the South (Scotland)	2–4	(Denmark) Nordsjælland	1–2	1–2
Gent (Belgium)	2–5	(Sweden) Kalmar FF	2–1	0–4
Manchester City (England)	1–1 (4–2 p)	(Denmark) Midtjylland	0–1	1–0 (a.e.t.)
Honka (Finland)	2–1	(Norway) Viking	0–0	2–1
Haka (Finland)	0–6	(Denmark) Brøndby	0–4	0–2
Stabæk (Norway)	2–3	(France) Rennes	2–1	0–2
Copenhagen (Denmark)	7–3	(Norway) Lillestrøm	3–1	4–2
IF Elfsborg (Sweden)	3–4	(Republic of Ireland) St Patrick's Athletic	2–2	1–2
FH (Iceland)	2–5	(England) Aston Villa	1–4	1–1

=== Southern region matches ===
14 August 2008
20:30

Široki Brijeg (Bosnia and Herzegovina)	1–2	(Turkey) Beşiktaş
Šilić 90+1'	Report	Delgado 19'; Mert Nobre 83'

Pecara Stadium, Široki Brijeg
Attendance: 4,500
Referee: César Muñiz Fernández (Spain)
28 August 2008
20:00

Beşiktaş (Turkey)	4–0	(Bosnia and Herzegovina) Široki Brijeg
İnceman 14'; Özkan 49'; Bobô 58'; Tello 85'	Report

BJK İnönü Stadium, Istanbul
Attendance: 17,486
Referee: René Rogalla (Switzerland)

Beşiktaş won 6–1 on aggregate.

14 August 2008
20:45

Braga (Portugal)	1–0	(Bosnia and Herzegovina) Zrinjski Mostar
Linz 68'	Report

Estádio Municipal de Braga, Braga
Attendance: 10,032
Referee: Robert Schörgenhofer (Austria)
28 August 2008
18:15

Zrinjski Mostar (Bosnia and Herzegovina)	0–2	(Portugal) Braga
	Report	Peixoto 56'; Matheus 90+3'

Bijeli Brijeg Stadium, Mostar
Attendance: 2,800
Referee: Sten Kaldma (Estonia)

Braga won 3–0 on aggregate.

14 August 2008
17:15

Borac Čačak (Serbia)	1–0	(Bulgaria) Lokomotiv Sofia
Pavlović 47'	Report

Fortress Stadium, Smederevo
Attendance: 2,000
Referee: Mark Courtney (Northern Ireland)
26 August 2008
19:00

Lokomotiv Sofia (Bulgaria)	1–1	(Serbia) Borac Čačak
Atanasov 18'	Report	Stojanović 37' (pen.)

Vasil Levski National Stadium, Sofia
Attendance: 1,357
Referee: Svein Oddvar Moen (Norway)

Borac Čačak won 2–1 on aggregate.

14 August 2008
17:30

Vojvodina (Serbia)	0–0	(Israel) Hapoel Tel Aviv
	Report

Karađorđe Stadium, Novi Sad
Attendance: 4,000
Referee: Oleh Oriekhov (Ukraine)
28 August 2008
18:00

Hapoel Tel Aviv (Israel)	3–0	(Serbia) Vojvodina
Yeboah 29'; Zahavi 58'; Abutbul 76' (pen.)	Report

Bloomfield Stadium, Tel Aviv
Attendance: 5,567
Referee: Kevin Blom (Netherlands)

Hapoel Tel Aviv won 3–0 on aggregate.

14 August 2008
20:00

Aris (Greece)	1–0	(Croatia) Slaven Belupo
Koke 55'	Report

Kleanthis Vikelidis Stadium, Thessalonika
Attendance: 15,000
Referee: Antonio Rubinos Pérez (Spain)
28 August 2008
18:30

Slaven Belupo (Croatia)	2–0	(Greece) Aris
Vručina 14', 65'	Report

Gradski stadion u Koprivnici, Koprivnica
Attendance: 2,800
Referee: Martin Ingvarsson (Sweden)

Slaven Belupo won 2–1 on aggregate.

14 August 2008
19:00

Litex Lovech (Bulgaria)	0–0	(Israel) Ironi Kiryat Shmona
	Report

Lovech Stadium, Lovech
Attendance: 2,381
Referee: Petteri Kari (Finland)
28 August 2008
18:00

Ironi Kiryat Shmona (Israel)	1–2	(Bulgaria) Litex Lovech
Tzarfati 8'	Report	Popov 21'; Sandrinho 53'

Kiryat Eliezer Stadium, Haifa
Attendance: 700
Referee: Draženko Kovačić (Croatia)

Litex Lovech won 2–1 on aggregate.

14 August 2008
21:00

Deportivo La Coruña (Spain)	0–0	(Croatia) Hajduk Split
	Report

Estadio Riazor, A Coruña
Attendance: 17,427
Referee: Cüneyt Çakır (Turkey)
28 August 2008
20:45

Hajduk Split (Croatia)	0–2	(Spain) Deportivo La Coruña
	Report	Riki 42'; Verdú 87' (pen.)

Poljud, Split
Attendance: 29,768
Referee: Gianluca Rocchi (Italy)

Deportivo La Coruña won 2–0 on aggregate.

14 August 2008
19:00

APOEL (Cyprus)	2–2	(Serbia) Red Star Belgrade
Broerse 34'; Kosowski 47'	Report	Edgar 9'; Burzanović 62'

GSP Stadium, Nicosia
Attendance: 10,188
Referee: Rob Styles (England)
28 August 2008
20:15

Red Star Belgrade (Serbia)	3–3 (a.e.t.)	(Cyprus) APOEL
Subašić 76'; Milijaš 79', 111'	Report	Kosowski 53'; Pinto 56'; Mirosavljević 116'

Stadion Crvena Zvezda, Belgrade
Attendance: 11,609
Referee: Julián Rodríguez Santiago (Spain)

5–5 on aggregate; APOEL won on away goals.

14 August 2008
20:30

Vllaznia (Albania)	0–3	(Italy) Napoli
	Report	Piá 28', 47'; Denis 75'

Loro-Boriçi Stadium, Shkodër
Attendance: 11,200
Referee: Stanislav Sukhina (Russia)
28 August 2008
21:00

Napoli (Italy)	5–0	(Albania) Vllaznia
Rinaudo 42', 54'; Piá 52'; Lavezzi 80'; Hamšík 87'	Report

Stadio San Paolo, Naples
Attendance: 21,550
Referee: Fırat Aydınus (Turkey)

Napoli won 8–0 on aggregate.

14 August 2008
20:10

Maccabi Netanya (Israel)	1–1	(Bulgaria) Cherno More
Kioyo 27'	Report	Alex 43'

Bloomfield Stadium, Tel Aviv
Attendance: 345
Referee: Bernhard Brugger (Austria)
28 August 2008
19:00

Cherno More (Bulgaria)	2–0	(Israel) Maccabi Netanya
Aleksandrov 8'; Pires 77'	Report

Vasil Levski National Stadium, Sofia
Attendance: 1,839
Referee: Andrejs Sipailo (Latvia)

Cherno More won 3–1 on aggregate.

14 August 2008
20:30

AEK Athens (Greece)	0–1	(Cyprus) Omonia
	Report	Cafú 43'

Olympic Stadium, Athens
Attendance: 13,472
Referee: Serge Gumienny (Belgium)
28 August 2008
21:00

Omonia (Cyprus)	2–2	(Greece) AEK Athens
Duro 11', 70'	Report	Blanco 16'; Pavlis 89'

GSP Stadium, Nicosia
Attendance: 20,265
Referee: Thorsten Kinhöfer (Germany)

Omonia won 3–2 on aggregate.

=== Central–East region matches ===
14 August 2008
17:00

Liepājas Metalurgs (Latvia)	0–2	(Romania) Vaslui
	Report	N'Doye 70'; Genchev 73'

Daugava Stadium, Liepāja
Attendance: 3,500
Referee: Aleksei Kulbakov (Belarus)
28 August 2008
19:30

Vaslui (Romania)	3–1	(Latvia) Liepājas Metalurgs
Burdujan 5'; Cânu 7'; N'Doye 30'	Report	Antonio Ferreira 85'

Stadionul Municipal, Vaslui
Attendance: 5,200
Referee: Mark Whitby (Wales)

Vaslui won 5–1 on aggregate.

14 August 2008
20:15

Zürich (Switzerland)	1–1	(Austria) Sturm Graz
Hassli 13'	Report	Haas 78' (pen.)

Letzigrund, Zürich
Attendance: 8,700
Referee: Stelios Trifonos (Cyprus)
28 August 2008
19:30

Sturm Graz (Austria)	1–1 (a.e.t.)	(Switzerland) Zürich
Hölzl 12'	Report	Abdi 5'
Penalties
Beichler (penalty scored); Hlinka (penalty missed); Haas (penalty scored); Lemotte (penalty missed)	2–4	(penalty scored) Barmettler; (penalty scored) Stahel; (penalty scored) Abdi; (penalty missed) Okonkwo; (penalty scored) Nikci

UPC-Arena, Graz
Attendance: 15,100
Referee: Daniel Stålhammar (Sweden)

2–2 on aggregate; Zürich won 4–2 on penalties.

14 August 2008
18:30

VfB Stuttgart (Germany)	2–1	(Hungary) Győri ETO
Tasci 12'; Marica 31'	Report	Böőr 44'

Mercedes-Benz Arena, Stuttgart
Attendance: 11,000
Referee: Paulo Costa (Portugal)
28 August 2008
20:30

Győri ETO (Hungary)	1–4	(Germany) VfB Stuttgart
Bajzát 81'	Report	Lanig 30'; Hitzlsperger 40'; Gómez 54', 60'

Stadion ETO, Győr
Attendance: 9,000
Referee: Espen Berntsen (Norway)

VfB Stuttgart won 6–2 on aggregate.

14 August 2008
20:45

Lech Poznań (Poland)	6–0	(Switzerland) Grasshopper
Rengifo 4'; Lewandowski 14', 56'; Vallori 76' (o.g.); Injac 84'; Peszko 88'	Report

Stadion Miejski, Poznań
Attendance: 16,500
Referee: Thomas Vejlgaard (Denmark)
28 August 2008
20:00

Grasshopper (Switzerland)	0–0	(Poland) Lech Poznań
	Report

AFG Arena, St. Gallen (Note: The return leg was played in AFG Arena, St. Gallen as Grasshopper's home ground, the Letzigrund is occupied by a Golden League athletics meet the following day.)
Attendance: 2,332
Referee: Christoforos Zografos (Greece)

Lech Poznań won 6–0 on aggregate.

14 August 2008
20:00

Slovan Liberec (Czech Republic)	1–2	(Slovakia) Žilina
Frejlach 85'	Report	Adauto 44'; Jež 58'

U Nisy Stadium, Liberec
Attendance: 7,700
Referee: Selçuk Dereli (Turkey)
28 August 2008
19:30

Žilina (Slovakia)	2–1	(Czech Republic) Slovan Liberec
Belák 81'; Jež 87'	Report	Nezmar 90+1'

Stadium Pod Dubňom, Žilina
Attendance: 7,498
Referee: Michael Weiner (Germany)

Žilina won 4–2 on aggregate.

14 August 2008
18:30

WIT Georgia (Georgia (country))	Cancelled (Note: The WIT Georgia v Austria Wien first leg match, originally scheduled to be played at Mikheil Meskhi Stadium, Tbilisi, was initially moved to Rize Atatürk Stadium, Rize, Turkey, a neutral venue, due to the Russo-Georgian War. However, the match was later cancelled due to travel safety concerns and the war's psychological impact on the WIT Georgia players. As a result, what was originally the second leg, hosted by Austria Wien, became the sole match of a single-leg tie.)	Austria Wien
	Report

Rize Atatürk Stadium, Rize, Turkey
Referee: Sorin Corpodean (Romania)
28 August 2008
19:30

Austria Wien	2–0	(Georgia (country)) WIT Georgia
Hattenberger 26'; Okotie 74'	Report

Franz Horr Stadium, Vienna
Attendance: 6,181
Referee: Joseph Attard (Malta)

Austria Wien won 2–0 on aggregate.

14 August 2008
19:30

Young Boys (Switzerland)	4–1	(Hungary) Debrecen
Schneuwly 41', 77'; Regazzoni 68', 87'	Report	Rudolf 17'

Stade de Suisse, Bern
Attendance: 6,646
Referee: Peter Rasmussen (Denmark)
28 August 2008
20:00

Debrecen (Hungary)	2–3	(Switzerland) Young Boys
Oláh 42'; Dudu 73'	Report	Schneuwly 33'; Regazzoni 56'; Yapi Yapo 67'

Stadion Oláh Gábor Út, Debrecen
Attendance: 2,844
Referee: Levan Paniashvili (Georgia)

Young Boys won 7–3 on aggregate.

14 August 2008
18:00

Legia Warsaw (Poland)	1–2	(Russia) FC Moscow
Guerreiro 66'	Report	Česnauskis 53'; Samedov 63'

Polish Army Stadium, Warsaw
Attendance: 6,000
Referee: Jouni Hyytiä (Finland)
28 August 2008
16:00

FC Moscow (Russia)	2–0	(Poland) Legia Warsaw
Strelkov 6'; Kuzmin 50'	Report

Eduard Streltsov Stadium, Moscow
Attendance: 3,500
Referee: Paolo Dondarini (Italy)

FC Moscow won 4–1 on aggregate.

14 August 2008
20:00

Dnipro Dnipropetrovsk (Ukraine)	3–2	(Switzerland) Bellinzona
Kalynychenko 10'; Nazarenko 47'; Kornilenko 78'	Report	Kalu 64'; Sermeter 75' (pen.)

Stadium Meteor, Dnipropetrovsk
Attendance: 12,000
Referee: Zsolt Szabo (Hungary)
28 August 2008
20:15

Bellinzona (Switzerland)	2–1	(Ukraine) Dnipro Dnipropetrovsk
Gashi 1'; La Rocca 76'	Report	Samodin 9'

Cornaredo Stadium, Lugano
Attendance: 4,200
Referee: Dragomir Stanković (Serbia)

4–4 on aggregate; Bellinzona won on away goals.

14 August 2008
20:45

Interblock (Slovenia)	0–2	(Germany) Hertha BSC
	Report	Pantelić 15', 80'

Arena Petrol, Celje (Note: Played at Arena Petrol in Celje as Interblock's home ground in Ljubljana did not meet UEFA criteria.)
Attendance: 2,020
Referee: Fredy Fautrel (France)
28 August 2008
18:30

Hertha BSC (Germany)	1–0	(Slovenia) Interblock
Ebert 2'	Report

Friedrich Ludwig Jahn Sportpark, Berlin
Attendance: 11,849
Referee: Bruno Paixão (Portugal)

Hertha BSC won 3–0 on aggregate.

14 August 2008
19:00

Sūduva (Lithuania)	1–4	(Austria) Red Bull Salzburg
Lukšys 31'	Report	Sekagya 42'; Janko 53' (pen.), 62' (pen.); Ngwat-Mahop 72'

Sūduva Stadium, Marijampolė
Attendance: 2,500
Referee: Serhiy Berezka (Ukraine)
28 August 2008
18:30

Red Bull Salzburg (Austria)	0–1	(Lithuania) Sūduva
	Report	Jasaitis 78'

Red Bull Arena, Salzburg
Attendance: 5,152
Referee: Veaceslav Banari (Moldova)

Red Bull Salzburg won 4–2 on aggregate.

=== Northern region matches ===
14 August 2008
19:00

Djurgårdens IF (Sweden)	2–1	(Norway) Rosenborg
Oremo 37'; Enrico 90'	Report	Sapara 76'

Råsunda Stadium, Solna
Attendance: 6,947
Referee: Dougie McDonald (Scotland)
28 August 2008
19:00

Rosenborg (Norway)	5–0	(Sweden) Djurgårdens IF
Iversen 43', 67' (pen.), 86' (pen.); Ya 65'; Skjelbred 73'	Report

Lerkendal Stadion, Trondheim
Attendance: 7,475
Referee: Sascha Kever (Switzerland)

Rosenborg won 6–2 on aggregate.

14 August 2008
20:45

Queen of the South (Scotland)	1–2	(Denmark) Nordsjælland
O'Connor 27'	Report	Kibebe 2'; Bernier 32'

Excelsior Stadium, Airdrie (Note: Played at Excelsior Stadium in Airdrie as Queen of the South's home ground in Dumfries did not meet UEFA criteria.)
Attendance: 4,406
Referee: Mihaly Fabian (Hungary)
26 August 2008
19:00

Nordsjælland (Denmark)	2–1	(Scotland) Queen of the South
Bernburg 85', 89'	Report	Harris 2'

Farum Park, Farum
Attendance: 3,452
Referee: Tony Chapron (France)

Nordsjælland won 4–2 on aggregate.

14 August 2008
20:00

Gent (Belgium)	2–1	(Sweden) Kalmar FF
Thijs 62'; Azofeifa 86'	Report	Ingelsten 81'

Jules Ottenstadion, Ghent
Attendance: 6,597
Referee: Alexandru Deaconu (Romania)
28 August 2008
19:00

Kalmar FF (Sweden)	4–0	(Belgium) Gent
Šuler 4' (o.g.); Ingelsten 54', 86', 90+1'	Report

Fredriksskans, Kalmar
Attendance: 2,614
Referee: David Malcolm (Northern Ireland)

Kalmar FF won 5–2 on aggregate.

14 August 2008
20:45

Manchester City (England)	0–1	(Denmark) Midtjylland
	Report	Olsen 15'

City of Manchester Stadium, Manchester
Attendance: 15,693
Referee: Babak Rafati (Germany)
28 August 2008
16:25

Midtjylland (Denmark)	0–1 (a.e.t.)	(England) Manchester City
	Report	Califf 89' (o.g.)
Penalties
Poulsen (penalty scored); Afriyie (penalty missed); Reid (penalty scored); Borring (penalty missed)	2–4	(penalty scored) Hamann; (penalty scored) Petrov; (penalty scored) Ćorluka; (penalty scored) Evans

SAS Arena, Herning
Attendance: 9,460
Referee: Robert Małek (Poland)

1–1 on aggregate; Manchester City won 4–2 on penalties.

14 August 2008
17:30

Honka (Finland)	0–0	(Norway) Viking
	Report

Tapiolan Urheilupuisto, Espoo
Attendance: 2,230
Referee: Luc Wilmes (Luxembourg)
28 August 2008
18:30

Viking (Norway)	1–2	(Finland) Honka
Gaarde 8'	Report	Hakanpää 20'; Lepola 56'

Viking Stadion, Stavanger
Attendance: 4,400
Referee: David McKeon (Republic of Ireland)

Honka won 2–1 on aggregate.

14 August 2008
18:00

Haka (Finland)	0–4	(Denmark) Brøndby
	Report	M.Rasmussen 30'; Lorentzen 70'; Williams 76'; Madsen 82' (pen.)

Tehtaan kenttä, Valkeakoski
Attendance: 1,912
Referee: Adrian McCourt (Northern Ireland)
28 August 2008
19:30

Brøndby (Denmark)	2–0	(Finland) Haka
Madsen 30'; Holmén 41'	Report

Brøndby Stadium, Brøndbyvester
Attendance: 5,139
Referee: Steve Tanner (England)

Brøndby won 6–0 on aggregate.

14 August 2008
19:00

Stabæk (Norway)	2–1	(France) Rennes
Kjølø 37', 71'	Report	Sow 77'

Nadderud stadion, Bærum
Attendance: 2,809
Referee: Mike Dean (England)
28 August 2008
20:30

Rennes (France)	2–0	(Norway) Stabæk
Leroy 38', 81'	Report

Stade de la Route de Lorient, Rennes
Attendance: 11,785
Referee: Igor Egorov (Russia)

Rennes won 3–2 on aggregate.

14 August 2008
20:00

Copenhagen (Denmark)	3–1	(Norway) Lillestrøm
Santin 1'; Júnior 79'; Nordstrand 85'	Report	Kippe 90'

Parken Stadium, Copenhagen
Attendance: 13,099
Referee: Johan Verbist (Belgium)
28 August 2008
19:00

Lillestrøm (Norway)	2–4	(Denmark) Copenhagen
Occean 29'; Brenne 75'	Report	Santin 10'; Aílton 29'; Hutchinson 79'; Júnior 86'

Åråsen stadion, Lillestrøm
Attendance: 2,502
Referee: Bernardino González Vázquez (Spain)

Copenhagen won 7–3 on aggregate.

14 August 2008
19:00

IF Elfsborg (Sweden)	2–2	(Republic of Ireland) St Patrick's Athletic
Ishizaki 24' (pen.); Karlsson 29'	Report	Quigley 57' (pen.); Dempsey 82'

Borås Arena, Borås
Attendance: 3,918
Referee: Paulius Malžinskas (Lithuania)
28 August 2008
20:45

St Patrick's Athletic (Republic of Ireland)	2–1	(Sweden) IF Elfsborg
Gavin 87'; Quigley 90'	Report	Ishizaki 63'

Richmond Park, Dublin
Attendance: 3,000
Referee: Richard Havrilla (Slovakia)

St Patrick's Athletic won 4–3 on aggregate.

14 August 2008
20:00

FH (Iceland)	1–4	(England) Aston Villa
M.Gudmundsson 45'	Report	Barry 4'; Young 7'; Agbonlahor 38'; Laursen 64'

Laugardalsvöllur, Reykjavík
Attendance: 8,686
Referee: Radek Matějek (Czech Republic)
28 August 2008
21:00

Aston Villa (England)	1–1	(Iceland) FH
Gardner 27'	Report	Björnsson 30'

Villa Park, Birmingham
Attendance: 25,415
Referee: Björn Kuipers (Netherlands)

Aston Villa won 5–2 on aggregate.
