= Jarkko =

Jarkko is a given name. Notable people with the given name include:

- Jarkko Ahola (born 1977), Finnish performing artist, composer and singer
- Jarkko Ala-Huikku (born 1980), Finnish Greco-Roman wrestler
- Jarkko Hattunen (born 1987), Finnish ice hockey player
- Jarkko Hentula (born 1970), Finnish film and television producer
- Jarkko Huovila (born 1975), Finnish orienteering competitor
- Jarkko Hurme (born 1986), Finnish footballer
- Jarkko Immonen (born 1982), Finnish ice hockey player
- Jarkko Immonen (ice hockey, born 1984) (born 1984), Finnish ice hockey player
- Jarkko Kari, Finnish mathematician and computer scientist
- Jarkko Kauppinen (born 1982), Finnish biathlete
- Jarkko Kauvosaari (born 1983), Finnish ice hockey player
- Jarkko Kinnunen (born 1984), Finnish race walker
- Jarkko Komula (born 1976), Finnish darts player
- Jarkko Lahdenmäki (born 1991), Finnish footballer
- Jarkko Lahti (born 1978), Finnish actor
- Jarkko Laine (1947–2006), Finnish poet and writer
- Jarkko Laukia, Finnish sport shooter
- Jarkko Luiro (born 1998), Finnish footballer
- Jarkko Määttä (born 1994), Finnish ski jumper
- Jarkko Malinen (born 1988), Finnish ice hockey player
- Jarkko Martikainen (born 1970), Finnish singer-songwriter
- Jarkko Näppilä (born 1988), Finnish ice hockey player
- Jarkko Niemi (actor) (born 1984), Finnish actor
- Jarkko Niemi (cyclist) (born 1982), Finnish cyclist
- Jarkko Nieminen (born 1981), Finnish tennis player
- Jarkko Nikara (born 1986), Finnish rally driver
- Jarkko Oikarinen (born 1967), Finnish IT professional
- Jarkko Okkonen (born 1978), Finnish footballer
- Jarkko Ruutu (born 1975), Finnish ice hockey player
- Jarkko Tapola (born 1944), Finnish sprinter
- Jarkko Tontti (born 1971), Finnish novelist, poet, essayist and lawyer
- Jarkko Värttö (born 1989), Finnish footballer
- Jarkko Varvio (born 1972), Finnish ice hockey player
- Jarkko Wiss (born 1972), Finnish footballer
