= Honk =

Honk may refer to:

- Honk (band)
- Honk (magazine)
- Honk!, a musical adaptation of the Hans Christian Andersen story The Ugly Duckling
- HONK!, the Festival of Activist Street Bands in Somerville, Massachusetts
- Honk, the Moose, a children's book by Phil Stong
- Honk (website), a social automotive website
- Honk (album), a 2019 compilation album by the Rolling Stones
- Making sound using a vehicle horn
- Vocalization associated with geese

HONK may refer to:

- Hyperosmolar hyperglycemic state, also known as hyperosmotic non-ketotic coma, a type of diabetic coma

== See also ==
- Honka (disambiguation)
- Honker (disambiguation)
- Honky (disambiguation)
