= Honka =

Honka can refer to:

== Places ==
- FC Honka, a Finnish football club
- "Object Honka", the "club house" in the Mezhyhirya Residence in Ukraine
- Honka Monka, a Long Island City nightclub

== People ==
- Anttoni Honka (born 2000), Finnish ice hockey defenceman
- Fritz Honka (1935–1998), German serial killer
- Hartmut Honka (born 1978), German conservative politician
- Julius Honka (born 1995), Finnish ice hockey player
- Juuso Honka (born 1990), Finnish ice hockey player
- Ondřej Honka (born 1986), Czech footballer

== Other ==
- Honkarakenne, a Finnish company
- Tapiolan Honka, a Finnish basketball team
  - Espoon Honka, the club Tapiolan formed from
- 2009 FC Honka season
- 2019 FC Honka season
- FC Honka, Finnish women's football team
