= 2009 FC Honka season =

Honka Espoo
2009 season
- Manager: Mika Lehkosuo
- Stadium: Tapiolan Urheilupuisto
- Veikkausliiga: 2nd
- Finnish Cup: Semi-final vs FC Tampere United
- League Cup: Runners-Up vs FC TPS Turku
- UEFA Europa League: Third qualifying round vs FK Qarabağ
Home colours	Away colours

== Squad ==
Note: Flags indicate national team as defined under FIFA eligibility rules; some limited exceptions apply. Players may hold more than one non-FIFA nationality.

No.	Pos.	Nation	Player
1	GK	FIN	Tuomas Peltonen
2	DF	FIN	Sampo Koskinen
3	DF	FIN	Roope Heilala
5	DF	FIN	Henri Aalto
6	FW	FIN	Hermanni Vuorinen
7	FW	FIN	John Weckström
8	FW	FIN	Markus Paatelainen
10	FW	FIN	Jami Puustinen
11	DF	FIN	Hannu Haarala
12	GK	FIN	Janne Henriksson
13	DF	FIN	Ville Koskimaa
14	MF	FIN	Jussi Vasara
15	FW	FIN	Aleksandr Kokko
16	FW	FIN	Jani Bäckman (season long loan to Haka)

No.	Pos.	Nation	Player
17	MF	GAM	Demba Savage
19	MF	FIN	Rami Hakanpää
20	MF	FIN	Nicholas Otaru
21	MF	FIN	Joel Perovuo
23	FW	FIN	Tim Väyrynen
24	MF	FIN	Jarkko Värttö
25	DF	FIN	Tapio Heikkilä
26	MF	FIN	Jaakko Lepola
27	MF	FIN	Konsta Rasimus
28	MF	FIN	Rasmus Schüller
29	MF	FIN	Juuso Simpanen
30	GK	FIN	Jan Vesterinen

Season stats for FC Honka are available here.

=== UEFA Europa League ===
==== Qualifying Phase ====
16 July 2009 2nd Qualifying Round 1st leg	FC Honka (Finland)	2 – 0	(Wales) Bangor City	Espoo, Finland
18:00 EEST (UTC+3)	Perovuo 15'; Schüller 74'			Stadium: Tapiolan Urheilupuisto; Attendance: 1,668; Referee: Matej Jug (Slovenia)

23 July 2009 2nd Qualifying Round 2nd leg	Bangor City (Wales)	0 – 1 (0 – 3 agg.)	(Finland) FC Honka	Wrexham, Wales
22:15 (UTC+1)			Puustinen 39'	Stadium: Racecourse Ground; Attendance: 602; Referee: Peter Sippel (Germany)

30 July 2009 3rd Qualifying Round 1st leg	FC Honka (Finland)	0 – 1	(Azerbaijan) Qarabağ FK	Helsinki, Finland
17:30 EEST (UTC+3)			Mammadov 69'	Stadium: Finnair Stadium; Referee: Albert Toussaint (Luxembourg)

6 August 2009 3rd Qualifying Round 2nd leg	Qarabağ FK (Azerbaijan)	2 – 1 (3 – 1 agg.)	(Finland) FC Honka	Baku, Azerbaijan
17:00 (UTC+4)	Mammadov 32'; Sadygov 81'		Koskinen 34'	Stadium: Tofiq Bahramov Republican Stadium; Referee: Tomasz Mikulski (Poland)
