= Okkonen =

Okkonen is a Finnish surname. Notable people with the surname include:

- Onni Okkonen (1886–1962), Finnish art historian
- Jarkko Okkonen (born 1978), Finnish football defender
- Antti Okkonen (born 1982), Finnish football player
