= Scott Painter =

American businessman

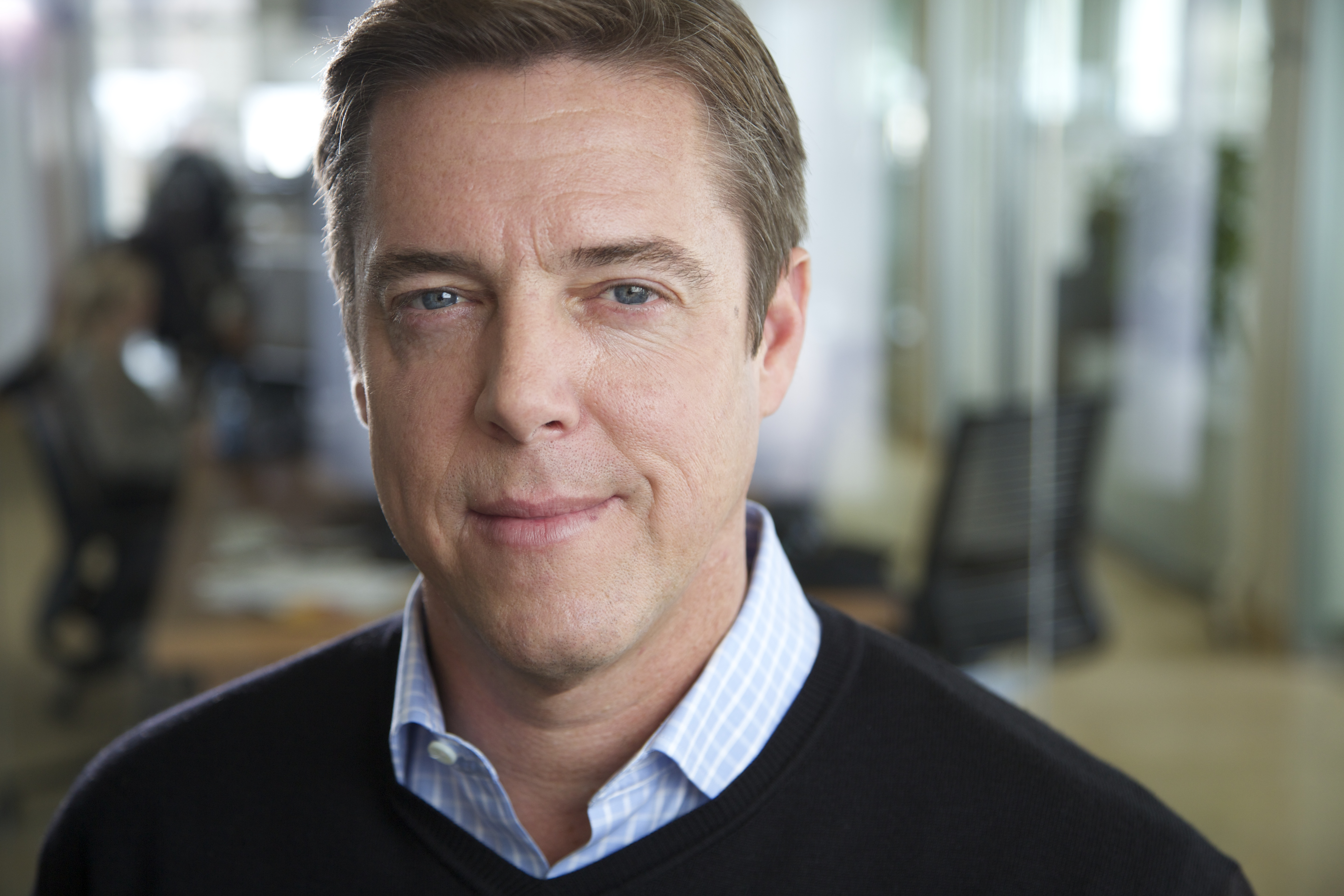
- Scott Painter in 2014
- Born: September 30, 1968 (age 58); Seattle, Washington, United States
- Education: United States Military Academy; University of California, Berkeley
- Occupations: Entrepreneur, investor
- Known for: Online auto retail entrepreneurship
- Children: 4

Scott Painter (born September 30, 1968) is an American entrepreneur in the technology and automotive industries.

In 2016, he co-founded Fair, Inc., a Los Angeles–based automotive financial technology company, with Georg Bauer

Previously, Painter founded and was the CEO of TrueCar, Inc. Prior to TrueCar, he was the founder and CEO of CarsDirect.com.

He has advised a number of automotive businesses including Tesla Motors.

== Early life and education ==
Painter was born in Seattle on September 30, 1968, and grew up in Placer County, California, near Sacramento. He started his first company, Scott's Auto Dealing, at the age of 14. After high school, he joined the United States Army and trained to become a Spanish interrogator. He attended West Point, where he studied military strategy and systems engineering. While at West Point, he was class president before transferring to UC Berkeley, where he studied political economics.

== Career ==
Painter left UC Berkeley before graduating to sell his first auto-related startup company, AUTOAccess, an electronic database listing used cars for sale. Prior to founding TrueCar, he initiated and was involved in other ventures. Painter was also an early advisor to Tesla.

=== TrueCar ===
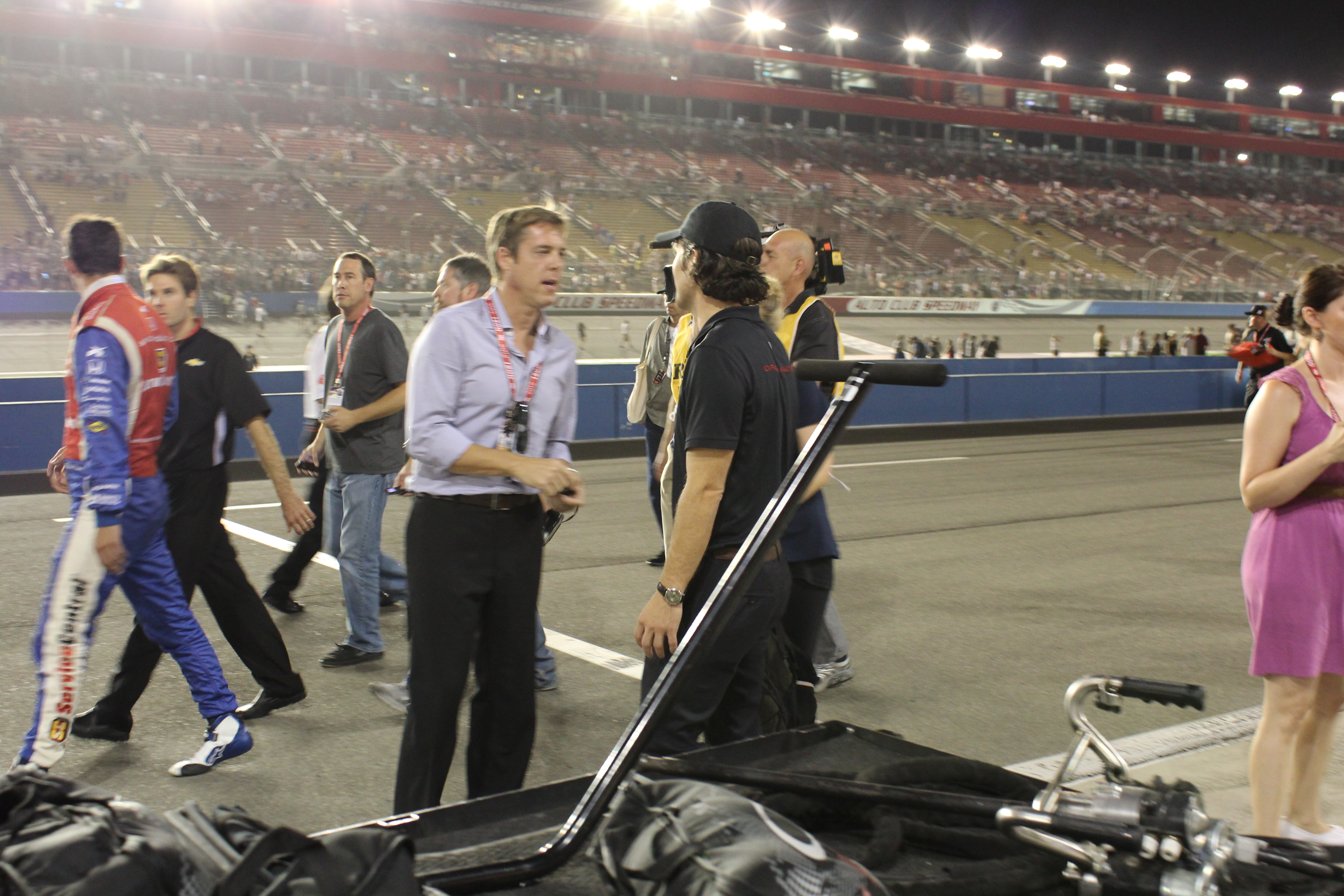
Painter at race track with TrueCar Racing

In 2005, Painter founded TrueCar, Inc., which is headquartered in Santa Monica, California. TrueCar is a negotiation-free car buying platform. TrueCar provides car-buyers with a transparent insight into what other buyers have paid, upfront pricing information, and a network of TrueCar certified dealers.

In August 2015, Painter stepped down as CEO. He was replaced by Chip Perry as of Dec.15, 2015.

=== Fair, Inc. ===
Painter’s later venture was Fair, Inc., an automotive financial technology company.

== Disruption with the auto industry ==
In late 2011, TrueCar raised significant debt and equity capital (>$200m) which enabled it to advertise nationally on television. Consumer usage increased in response to the television campaign that was developed in conjunction with TrueCar investor Guthy-Renker, but dealer and industry criticism was significant and well documented in a series of Automotive News articles.

Painter, who is commonly associated with vehicle pricing transparency, up-front pricing, and the value of big data in auto retail, received pushback from auto dealers and manufacturers over the fear that TrueCar was responsible for significant retail price discounting. The industry resistance led to nearly a dozen states launching investigations into the company's practices and policies. As a result, Painter and TrueCar underwent a nine-month regulatory compliance overhaul and initiated industry outreach programs.

TrueCar went through a business turnaround in 2012 that resulted in the company reporting in its S-1 filing that it had generated positive adjusted EBITDA in 2013 after having lost over $40 million in 2012. In December 2011, Painter was featured in Forbes regarding TrueCar's business practices and, in November 2012, he spoke directly to the industry about the current status of TrueCar in an Autoline TV interview. Also in November 2012, TrueCar went back on television with new commercials and a completely new version of its web experience for both dealers and consumers.

== Recognition ==
The Technology Council of Southern California named Painter its 2009 and 2012 Entrepreneur of the Year. In 2011 and 2014, he was named a finalist for the Ernst and Young Entrepreneur of the Year Award for the Greater Los Angeles Area. Painter won the EY Award for Entrepreneur of the Year in consumer services for 2014.

In 2011, Scott became a member of the Swiss non-profit organization known as the World Economic Forum. In 2012, Painter was named a Technology Pioneer by the WEF.

In 2011, Painter launched TrueCar Racing, an all-female racing team, co-sponsored by Penske Media Corporation and Virgin Group. The racing team supported high-potential women aspiring to become premier race series race car drivers. TrueCar and its partners provided full sponsorship support, professional coaching and training, marketing exposure, and top-tier racing team opportunities throughout the U.S. with the goal of winning races and championships.

Painter was one of the youngest members to join of the Board of Governors at Cedars-Sinai Medical Center.

== Personal life ==
Scott Painter lives in Los Angeles with his wife; they have four children.
