= VroomGirls =

Online Magazine

VroomGirls is an American online automobile magazine targeting the female auto buyer.

== History and profile ==
The site was founded on October 18, 2011, by editor-in-chief Tara Weingarten, a longtime automotive journalist and formerly author of the "Road Test" car review feature for Newsweek magazine. The magazine is headquartered in Los Angeles.

In their columns about VroomGirls, Forbes and The Dallas Morning News pointed out that women buy a large percentage of all new cars and influence most of the rest of the purchases, and that marketers of auto-related products prefer targeted advertising venues. As Psychology Today columnist E.E. Smith observed", what matters to the male buyer may be quite different from what matters to us girls."

The VroomGirls website has twice been named a Webby Award honoree in the Car Sites & Car Culture category. In 2014, it was one of just six sites so honored, and in 2013 it was one of seven.

VroomGirls features new car reviews, auto-buying advice, driving tips and information on getting value and enjoyment from automobiles.

In October 2011, VroomGirls entered into an agreement with TrueCar to sell automobiles via the VroomGirls website.

The site created its first Cars of the Year "Vroomie" awards in December 2011.
