= Ike & Tina on the Road: 1971–72 =

On the Road: 1971–72
- Directed by: Nadya & Bob Gruen
- Starring: Ike Turner; Tina Turner
- Distributed by: MVD Visual
- Release date: November 20, 2012
- Running time: 90 minutes
- Country: United States

On the Road: 1971–72 is a documentary film about Ike & Tina Turner. The footage was assembled by rock photographer Bob Gruen and his wife Nadya. The film was released in 2012 and won the 2014 Living Blues Award for Best Blues DVD of 2013.

== Film content ==
Photographer Bob Gruen first saw Ike & Tina Turner perform at New York City in 1969. After Gruen took photos of them performing at the Honka Monka nightclub in Queens in 1970, he showed the photos to Ike Turner. Turner invited him to work with them and they developed a friendship. On the Road: 1971–72 features footage of Ike & Tina Turner performing on tour and behind the scenes.

In 2018, Gruen wrote on Please Kill Me:

When I met them I had just gotten one of the first video recorders, the Sony Portapac, which you lugged around in a 40-pound box. You could film maybe 30 minutes at a time. It's so funny that everyone now carries around their own private video cameras inside their phones, but using that bulky equipment, I made a lot of video tapes for them; Tina liked being able to show the tapes to the Ikettes right after the show to help improve their act. But I also made a lot of videos of Ike and Tina over the years, not just on stage, but as regular people, at their home, cooking, etc.

== Critical reception ==
Reviewing the film for No Depression, Grant Britt wrote:

Scandal seekers need not bother viewing this. There's no footage of Ike bullying Tina. She looks happy and in charge, on stage and off, a willing partner of the most electrifying rock and soul revue of their day, arguably of all times. This intimate portrait of Ike and Tina Turner at the height of their powers is touching and riveting.

Reviewing the film for Guitar World, Lukasz Bielawski wrote:

The DVD includes renditions of several Ike & Tina classics, glimpses of the group at work in the recording studio, Tina and the Ikettes practicing their dance routines, primping their wigs, and goofing around on airplanes and in airports. We even get to see inside Ike & Tina's house and the couple's funky retro '70s home décor, as Tina cooks dinner for her kids. The film was shot by portable video recorders that were not as prominent during that era as they are nowadays, no one has seen scenes like this.

== Awards ==
On The Road: 1971–72 won the 2014 Living Blues Award for Best Blues DVD of 2013.

== Track listing ==
List of the songs featured in On the Road 1971–72:

- "River Deep, Mountain High"
- "Pick Me Up (Take Me Where Your Home Is)"
- "Oh Devil"
- "Gulf Coast Blues"
- "Shake a Tail Feather"
- "There Was a Time"
- "Heard It Through the Grapevine"
- "Respect"
- "A Love Like Yours (Don't Come Knockin' Every Day)"
- "Under the Weather"
- "I've Been Loving You Too Long"
- "Walking the Dog"
- "You've Got to Get That Feeling"
- "Try a Little Tenderness"
- "Proud Mary"
- "I Smell Trouble"
- "Shine"
- Instrumental Theme Song
- "I Want to Take You Higher"
