= Boban Stojanović (footballer) =

Serbian footballer

Personal information
- Full name: Boban Stojanović
- Date of birth: 27 February 1979 (age 47)
- Place of birth: Belgrade, SFR Yugoslavia
- Height: 1.82 m (6 ft 0 in)
- Position: Striker

Youth career
- Red Star Belgrade

Senior career*
Years	Team	Apps	(Gls)
1998–2007	Red Star Belgrade	20	(1)
1998–1999	→ Železnik (loan)	13	(0)
2001–2002	→ Jedinstvo Ub (loan)	17	(5)
2002–2003	→ Radnički Obrenovac (loan)	29	(11)
2003	→ Leotar (loan)	12	(3)
2004–2005	→ Borac Čačak (loan)	41	(20)
2006	→ Hajduk Kula (loan)	21	(5)
2007	UTA Arad	11	(1)
2008–2009	Borac Čačak	50	(7)
2009	Panetolikos	8	(1)
2010	Borac Čačak	26	(1)
2011	Srem Jakovo	13	(6)
2011	Radnički Nova Pazova	12	(2)
2012	Voždovac	4	(0)
2012	London City		
2013	Jedinstvo Ub		
2013	London City		
2014–2016	Jedinstvo Ub		
Total		277	(63)
- * Club domestic league appearances and goals

Boban Stojanović (Serbian Cyrillic: Бобан Стојановић; born 27 February 1979) is a Serbian former professional footballer who played as a striker.

== Career ==
Stojanović came through the youth system of Red Star Belgrade, before being loaned out on several occasions. He enjoyed most success at First League of Serbia and Montenegro sides Radnički Obrenovac and Borac Čačak, scoring in double digits.

In early 2007, Stojanović was transferred to Romanian club UTA Arad. He returned to his homeland and rejoined Borac Čačak in early 2008, helping them secure a spot in UEFA competitions for the first time in history. In the 2008–09 UEFA Cup, Stojanović scored two goals during the qualifying rounds. He also appeared in both legs against Ajax in the first round, as they were eliminated 6–1 on aggregate.

In 2012, Stojanović agreed terms with Canadian Soccer League side London City. He later returned to Serbia and briefly played for his former club Jedinstvo Ub, before rejoining London City in 2013. In 2014, Stojanović made another return to Jedinstvo Ub.
