= CarsDirect =

- Website type: Automotive Content / Ecommerce
- Founded: June 27, 1998; 28 years ago
- Headquarters: El Segundo, California
- Parent: MH Sub I, LLC DBA CarsDirect.com
- Website: CarsDirect.com
- Advertising: Yes

CarsDirect is an American online automotive research portal and car buying service based in El Segundo, California, that allows consumers to research, price, purchase, insure and finance a vehicle online. The company also provides lead generation and referral services to auto dealers.

== History ==
CarsDirect was founded in 1998 by Scott Painter, launched from the business incubator Idealab. It was the first company to sell vehicles online directly to consumers, rather than referring consumers to brick-and-mortar dealers.

CarsDirect first registered for an initial public offering in a May 2000 filing with the U.S. Securities and Exchange Commission; however, it withdrew its registration in December of that year citing "unfavorable conditions in the public equity market."

In 2004, the firm began to expand into other markets, and subsequently changed its name to Internet Brands in 2005.

In June 2014, the company announced that it had been acquired by Kohlberg Kravis Roberts (KKR) for $1.1 Billion.

== Recognitions and awards ==
- PC World named CarsDirect a top 7 site for "buying or selling anything" in 2008.
- PC Magazine selected CarsDirect as a "Top 100 Classic Website" in 2002, 2003, and 2004.
