= Bob Gruen =

American author and photographer (born Oct 23 1945)

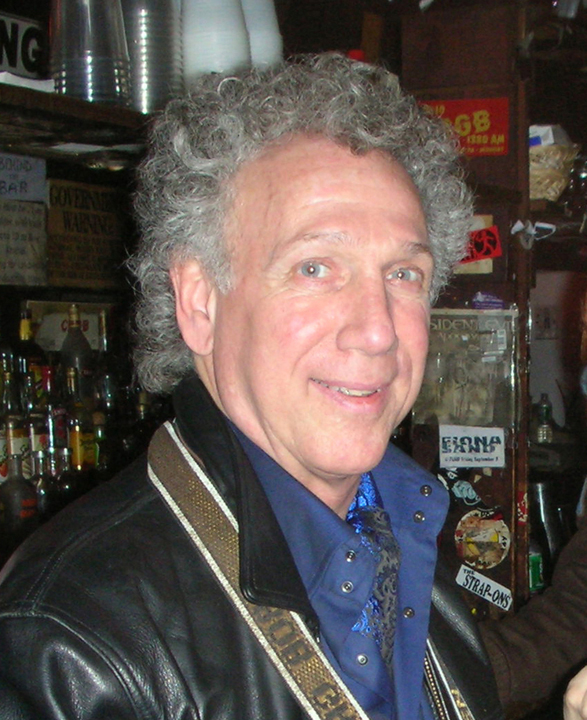
- Gruen in 2006
- Born: October, 23 1945; New York City, U.S.
- Occupation: Photographer
- Years active: 1970–present
- Spouses: Nadya Beck (divorced) Elizabeth Gregroy Gruen (m. 1995)
- Website: Official website

Bob Gruen (born October 23, 1945) is an American author and photographer known for his rock and roll photographs. By the mid 1970s, Gruen was already regarded as one of the foremost photographers in music working with major artist such as John Lennon, Tina Turner, the Rolling Stones, Led Zeppelin, Elton John, and Kiss. He also covered emerging new wave and punk rock bands, including the New York Dolls, the Clash, Sex Pistols, Ramones, The Dynomiters and Blondie. Gruen has also appeared in films.

== Career ==
Gruen was born and raised in New York. After he dropped out of college and quit his job in a photo booth at the New York World's Fair in Queens, he attended the 1965 Newport Folk Festival and took photographs of Bob Dylan performing.

Gruen credits Ike Turner with starting his career. He first saw Ike & Tina Turner perform at Madison Square Garden during the Rolling Stones' American tour in 1969. (Note: Gruen incorrectly dates the concert as 1968 in the interview. The Rolling Stones' American Tour was in 1969.) In 1970, Gruen took photographs of them performing at the Honka Monka nightclub in Queens. He showed Turner the photographs and was invited to photograph them in California. "Ike introduced me to the publicist for their record company who took me to parties and introduced me to more people in the music business," he said. Gruen developed a friendship with the Turners and shot the cover of their 1971 album 'Nuff Said. In 2012, Gruen released Ike & Tina On the Road: 1971–72, a documentary he and his then-wife Nadya filmed of the Turners at their home and on tour.

Gruen served as John Lennon's personal photographer during his time in New York City in 1971. Gruen is best known for his photograph of Lennon wearing a New York City T-shirt. Other notable celebrities and rock bands photographed by Bob Gruen include the New York Dolls, Wallace Collins & The Dynomiters the Clash, Ramones, Sex Pistols, Patti Smith Group, Sonny & Cher, Blondie, Led Zeppelin, the Who, David Bowie, Elton John, Aerosmith, Kiss, Alice Cooper, Courtney Love, and Green Day.

Since 1980, Morrison Hotel Gallery has been the primary representative for Gruen's photography. His work is included in the collections of the National Portrait Gallery in London and the Museum of Pop Culture in Seattle.

In 2008, Gruen's Rockers, a 280 photograph installation, exhibited at Morrison Hotel Gallery in New York. From December 2011 to January 2012, the Fahey/Klein Gallery in Los Angeles held an exhibition of Gruen's photographs from his book Rock Seen. His photographs have been exhibited at various art galleries and museums internationally, including the Museum of Modern Art in New York, the Brooklyn Museum, Sotheby's S/2 Gallery London, the Morris Museum in New Jersey, Shelburne Museum in Vermont.

In 2020, Gruen released his memoir Right Place, Right Time: The Life of a Rock & Roll Photographer.

== Personal life ==
Gruen has a son, Kris Gruen, with his former wife Nadya Beck.

Gruen has been married to Elizabeth Gregory Gruen since 1995.

As a humanitarian, Gruen has worked with many local and international charities to raise money in support of their life-affirming missions. A partial list includes: WhyHunger, Her Justice, Tibet House, the Kristen Ann Carrr Fund, the Donaldson Adoption Institute, Save the Music, MusicCares, and Aperture Foundation.

== Accolades ==
Bob's magical photos and brilliantly telling captions together present a kaleidoscope of John Lennon's New York Period. It is beautiful, clear, and truthful. I know. I was there.

— Yoko Ono (John Lennon: The New York Years by Bob Gruen)

In 2004, Gruen was presented with Mojo magazine's prestigious Honours List Award for Classic Image in London.

In 2007, he received the International Society of Photographers Outstanding Achievement Award and the Great Neck Arts Center Artist of Distinction Award.

In 2010, Gruen was inducted into the Long Island Music Hall of Fame.

In 2014, his documentary film Ike & Tina On The Road: 1971–72 won the Living Blues Award for Best Blues DVD of 2013.

For his many charitable contributions, Gruen received the first ever John Lennon Real Love Award at the 32nd Annual John Lennon Tribute Concert in December 2014.

== Album cover photography ==
- 1971: Ike & Tina Turner – 'Nuff Said
- 1971: Larry Coryell – Barefoot Boy
- 1971: Mark Dimond – Brujeria
- 1971: Labelle – Labelle
- 1972: Eddy Senay – Hot Thang
- 1973: Yoko Ono – Approximately Infinite Universe
- 1974: Fred & The New J.B.'s – Breakin' Bread
- 1975: John Hammond – Can't Beat The Kid
- 1975: Kiss – Dressed To Kill
- 1979: Ramones – It's Alive
- 1981: John Lennon – John Lennon
- 1982: Yoko Ono – It's Alright (I See Rainbows)
- 1993: Bob Dylan – The 30th Anniversary Concert Celebration
- 2002: Heart – The Essential Heart
- 2013: Johnny Winter – Live Bootleg Series Vol. 10

== Books ==
- The Sex Pistols: Chaos (1990), ISBN 978-0711921214
- The Rolling Stones – Crossfire Hurricane (1997), Genesis Publications
- The Clash (2004), ISBN 978-1903399347
- John Lennon – The New York Years (2005), ISBN 978-1584794325
- Rockers: The Exhibit (Cosac Naify, 2007)
- New York Dolls Photographs by Bob Gruen (2008), ISBN 978-0810972711
- Rock Seen: Bob Gruen (2011), ISBN 978-0810997721
- Right Place, Right Time: The Life of a Rock & Roll Photographer (2020), ISBN 978-1419742132

== Films ==
- All Dolled Up – A New York Dolls Story (2005)
- Joe Strummer: The Future Is Unwritten (2007)
- Rock 'N' Roll Exposed: The Photography of Bob Gruen (2011)
- LENNONYC (2010)
- New York Dolls – Lookin' Fine on Television (2011)
- Ike & Tina on the Road: 1971–72 (2012)
