= Antti Okkonen =

Finnish footballer (born 1982)

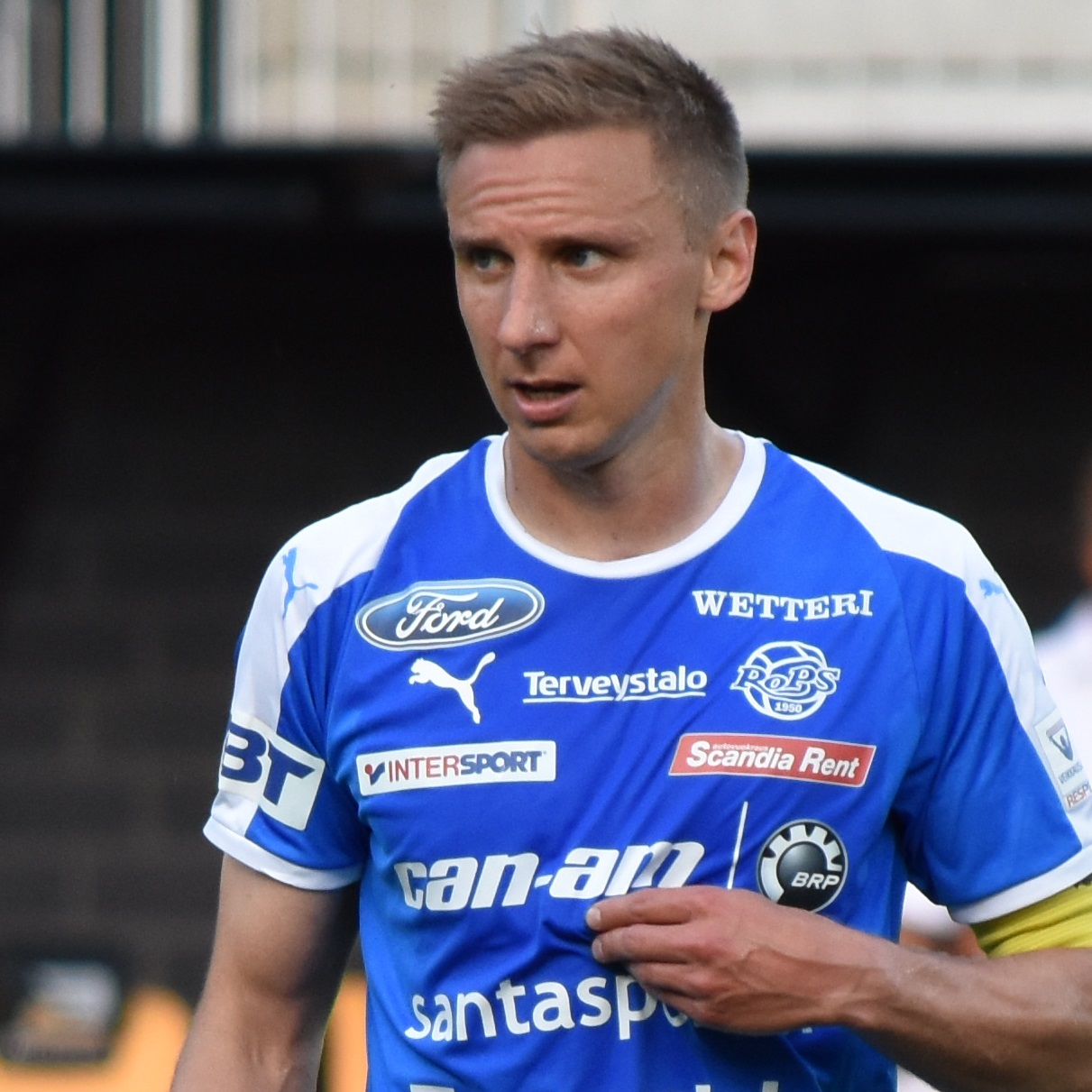
- Okkonen with RoPS in 2018.

Personal information
- Date of birth: 6 June 1982 (age 44)
- Place of birth: Oulu, Finland
- Height: 1.77 m (5 ft 10 in)
- Position: Midfielder

Youth career
- OLS

Senior career*
Years	Team	Apps	(Gls)
2000–2003	MyPa	98	(6)
2004–2007	Landskrona BoIS	93	(3)
2007	→ Silkeborg (loan)	12	(1)
2008–2009	Mons	36	(2)
2009–2011	MyPa	42	(2)
2012	HJK	22	(0)
2013–2018	RoPS	162	(5)

International career
2003–2006	Finland	13	(0)
- * Club domestic league appearances and goals

Antti Okkonen (born 6 June 1982) is a former footballer who played in Finland, Sweden, Denmark and Belgium. In addition, he played for the national team. He was a defensive midfielder.

== Career ==
Okkonen started youth career in Oulun Luistinseura. He made his debut on the club's OPS representative team in the second season in 1998. He made his league debut at Myllykoski Pallo in the year 2000. In MyPa's shirt, Okkonen won one Finnish Championship silver and two Finnish Championship bronzes during three seasons (2000–2003).

From Myllykoski, Okkonen moved to Sweden in the team of Landskrona for four (2004–2007) seasons. In the first half of 2007, he was on loan in Silkeborg, Denmark. In January 2008, Okkonen moved to the Belgian RAEC Mons, where he played for one and a half seasons. In August 2009, he returned to MyPa with a contract for the rest of the season, which was extended for two years at the end of the period. For the 2012 season, Okkonen joined the team of the reigning Finnish champion Helsinki Football Club, where he also won the only Finnish championship in his career.

After the championship season, Okkonen moved to the Rovaniemi Football Club, where he would play his final years. He managed to play 6 seasons (2013–2018) in RoPS, during this period he won the Finnish Cup 2013 and two Finnish Championship silver medals in 2015 and 2018. He also served as the team's captain.

During his career in Veikkausliiga, Okkonen played more than 300 matches and played 13 national matches in the Finnish national team. He has also played 18 youth and 56 boys national matches. Okkonen participated in the Finnish team at the 2001 World Championships for under-20s.

After the end of his player career, Antti Okkonen continued his cooperation with the RoPS and currently works as a junior manager and is responsible for the activities of 7-12 year olds.

== Career statistics ==
As of 1 September 2024.

Appearances and goals by club, season and competition
Club	Season	League			Cup (Note: Includes Suomen Cup and Belgian Cup)		League cup (Note: Includes Finnish League Cup)		Europe		Total	
Club	Season	Division	Apps	Goals	Apps	Goals	Apps	Goals	Apps	Goals	Apps	Goals
OPS	1998	Kakkonen	12	0	–		–		–		12	0
OPS	1999	Kakkonen	20	7	–		–		–		20	7
OPS	Total		32	7	0	0	0	0	0	0	32	7
MyPa	2000	Veikkausliiga	20	2	–		–		–		20	2
MyPa	2001	Veikkausliiga	27	3	–		–		1 (Note: Appearance(s) in UEFA Cup)	0	28	3
MyPa	2002	Veikkausliiga	27	1	–		–		2	0	29	1
MyPa	2003	Veikkausliiga	24	0	–		–		4	2	28	2
MyPa	Total		98	6	0	0	0	0	7	2	105	8
Landskrona BoIS	2004	Allsvenskan	25	0	–		–		–		25	0
Landskrona BoIS	2005	Allsvenskan	23	1	–		–		–		23	1
Landskrona BoIS	2006	Superettan	28	2	–		–		–		28	2
Landskrona BoIS	2007	Superettan	17	0	–		–		–		17	0
Landskrona BoIS	Total		93	3	0	0	0	0	0	0	93	3
Silkeborg (loan)	2006–07	Danish Superliga	12	1	–		–		–		12	1
R.A.E.C. Mons	2007–08	Belgian First Division	13	1	1	0	–		–		14	1
R.A.E.C. Mons	2008–09	Belgian First Division	24	1	1	0	–		–		25	1
R.A.E.C. Mons	Total		37	2	2	0	0	0	0	0	39	2
MyPa	2009	Veikkausliiga	7	0	–		–		–		7	0
MyPa	2010	Veikkausliiga	24	1	1	0	1	0	6 (Note: Appearances in UEFA Europa League)	1	32	2
MyPa	2011	Veikkausliiga	11	1	1	0	2	0	–		14	1
MyPa	Total		42	2	2	0	3	0	6	1	53	3
HJK Helsinki	2012	Veikkausliiga	22	0	3	0	9	1	4 (Note: Appearances in UEFA Champions League and UEFA Europa League)	0	38	1
RoPS	2013	Veikkausliiga	30	3	5	0	2	0	–		37	3
RoPS	2014	Veikkausliiga	32	1	2	0	4	0	2	0	40	1
RoPS	2015	Veikkausliiga	30	0	1	0	6	0	–		37	0
RoPS	2016	Veikkausliiga	16	0	1	0	5	1	2	0	24	1
RoPS	2017	Veikkausliiga	25	0	2	0	–		–		27	0
RoPS	2018	Veikkausliiga	29	1	5	0	–		–		34	1
RoPS	Total		162	5	16	0	17	1	4	0	199	6
Career total			498	26	23	0	29	2	21	3	571	31

=== International ===
Finland national team
Year	Apps	Goals
2003	3	0
2004	6	0
2005	2	0
2006	2	0
Total	13	0

Statistics accurate as of match played 25 January 2006

== Personal life ==
Antti is the younger brother of former footballer Jarkko Okkonen.

== Honours ==
=== Veikkausliiga ===
- Promising player of the year 2001
- Champion 2012
  - Runner-up 2002, 2015, 2018
  - Third place 2000, 2001
- Finnish Cup 2013

Individual

- Veikkausliiga Player of the Month: September 2015
