= Jarkko Tontti =

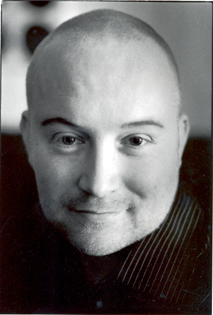
- Born: 9 December 1971 (age 54); Tampere, Finland
- Occupations: Poet, Novelist, Lawyer
- Writing career
- Genres: Prose, Poetry
- Website: jarkkotontti.net

Jarkko Olavi Tontti (born 9 December 1971) is a Finnish novelist, poet, essayist and lawyer. He is former member of PEN International Executive Board and former president of Finnish PEN.

Tontti studied law, philosophy and literature at the universities of Helsinki, Edinburgh, Berlin and Brussels. Doctor of Laws 2002. He has published collections of poems, novels and essays. His first poetry collection Vuosikirja (Book of Years, 2006) won the Kalevi Jäntti literature prize for young authors.

Tontti has worked in the Ministry of Justice, Ministry of Foreign Affairs, Local Court of Espoo, in the Parliament of Finland and at the University of Helsinki. He is a specialist in philosophy of law, freedom of expression law and copyright law.

His poems have been translated into 20 languages, English, French, Spanish, Swedish, Italian, Russian, Japanese, Estonian, German, Greek, Slovenian, Latin, Czech, Marathi, Polish, Mari, Hebrew, Croatian, Romanian and Portuguese.

== Novels ==
- Haava (Wound, novel, 2021)
- Perintö (Legacy, novel, 2018)
- Lento (Flight, novel, 2013)
- Sali (Gym, novel, 2011)
- Luokkakokous (Class reunion, novel, 2007)

== Poetry ==
- Kangasalan ja Jerusalemin runot (Poems, 2024)
- Lain laita (Poems, 2020)
- Jacasser (Jacasser, poems, 2009)
- Vuosikirja (Book of Years, poems, 2006)

== Essays ==
- Tarkoituksista ja keinoista (Means and Ends, essays, 2022)
- Viisastuminen sallittu (Wisening Permitted, essays, 2016)
- Koti, uskonto ja isänmaa (Home, Religion and Fatherland, essays, 2011)

== Fantasy Novels ==
- Vedeera ja vuorten pitkät varjot (Vedeera and the Long Shadows of the Mountains, fantasy novel, 2026)
- Vedeera ja polttavan auringon maa (Vedeera and the Land of Burning Sun, fantasy novel, 2022)
- Vedeera vaarallisilla vesillä (Vedeera in Perilous Waters, fantasy novel, 2018)
- Vedeeran taru (The Tale of Vedeera, fantasy novel, 2012)
