= Jarkko Näppilä =

Finnish ice hockey player

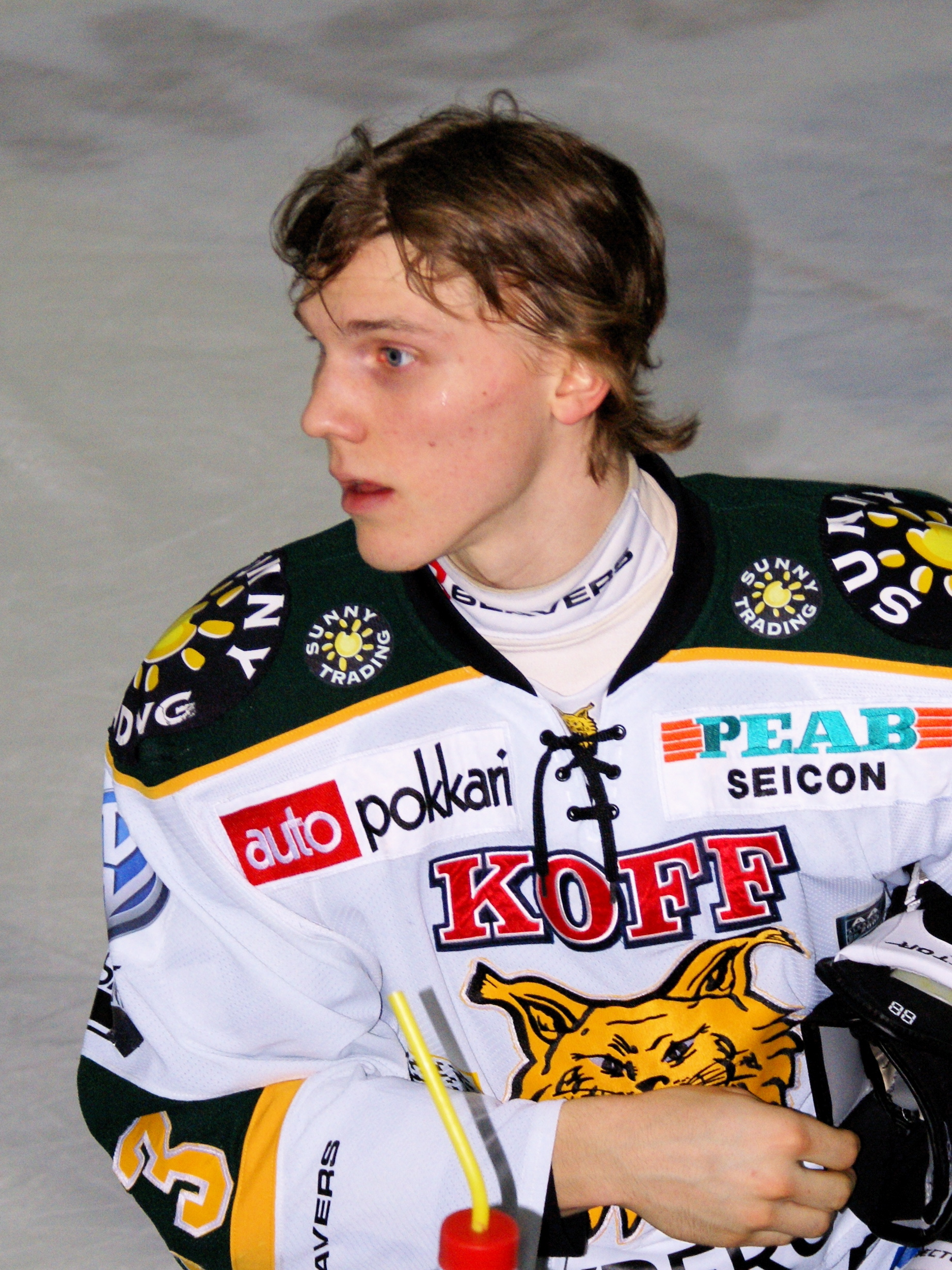
- Finnish ice hockey defenseman Jarkko Näppilä of Ilves Tampere in March, 2009.
- Born: July 6, 1988 (age 37) Tampere, Finland
- Height: 6 ft 0 in (183 cm)
- Weight: 171 lb (78 kg; 12 st 3 lb)
- Position: Defence
- Shoots: Left
- SM-liiga team: Ilves
- NHL draft: Undrafted
- Playing career: 2006–present

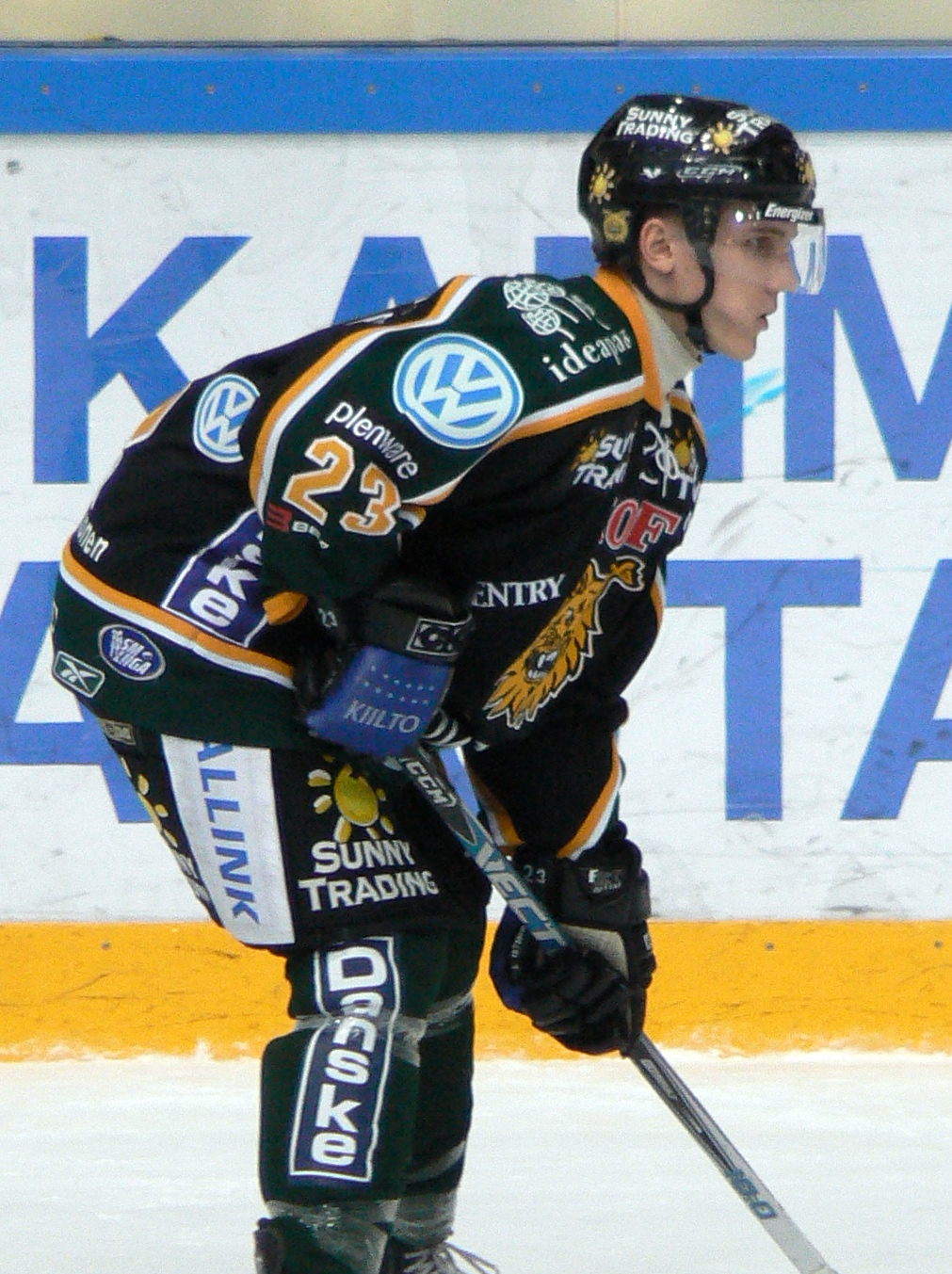
Jarkko Näppilä playing for Ilves on January, 2008.

Jarkko Näppilä (born July 6, 1988) is a Finnish ice hockey defenceman. He is currently playing with Ilves in the Finnish Liiga.

Nappila made his SM-liiga debut playing with Ilves during the 2006–07 SM-liiga season.

== Career statistics ==
			Regular season					Playoffs
Season	Team	League	GP	G	A	Pts	PIM	GP	G	A	Pts	PIM
2003–04	Ilves U16	U16 SM-sarja	21	2	4	6	2	6	0	3	3	0
2004–05	Ilves U18	U18 SM-sarja	23	0	3	3	22	3	0	0	0	2
2005–06	Ilves U18	U18 SM-sarja	5	0	0	0	6	5	1	3	4	8
2005–06	Ilves U20	U20 SM-liiga	32	0	2	2	32	3	0	1	1	2
2006–07	Ilves U20	U20 SM-liiga	32	2	13	15	141	5	1	2	3	10
2006–07	Ilves	SM-liiga	17	0	0	0	0	—	—	—	—	—
2006–07	Suomi U20	Mestis	1	0	1	1	4	—	—	—	—	—
2007–08	Ilves U20	U20 SM-liga	34	3	15	18	92	—	—	—	—	—
2007–08	Ilves	SM-liiga	21	0	0	0	14	9	0	0	0	2
2007–08	Suomi U20	Mestis	4	0	0	0	6	—	—	—	—	—
2008–09	Ilves U20	U20 SM-liiga	4	0	1	1	0	—	—	—	—	—
2008–09	Ilves	SM-liiga	34	0	3	3	8	3	0	0	0	4
2008–09	LeKi	Mestis	7	0	1	1	4	—	—	—	—	—
2009–10	Ilves U20	U20 SM-liiga	3	0	1	1	14	—	—	—	—	—
2009–10	Ilves	SM-liiga	19	1	1	2	10	—	—	—	—	—
2009–10	LeKi	Mestis	10	2	1	3	34	—	—	—	—	—
2010–11	LeKi	Mestis	46	8	16	24	95	3	0	2	2	0
2011–12	Jokipojat	Mestis	37	6	17	23	61	12	1	3	4	20
2012–13	LeKi	Mestis	27	11	11	22	107	—	—	—	—	—
2012–13	Ilves	SM-liiga	22	1	4	5	14	—	—	—	—	—
2013–14	Ilves	Liiga	46	6	10	16	36	—	—	—	—	—
2014–15	Ilves	Liiga	40	4	10	14	18	2	0	0	0	6
2015–16	Ilves	Liiga	48	0	9	9	20	—	—	—	—	—
SM-liiga totals			247	12	37	49	120	14	0	0	0	12
Mestis totals			132	27	47	74	311	15	1	5	6	20
