= Sampo Koskinen =

Finnish footballer and coach (born 1979)

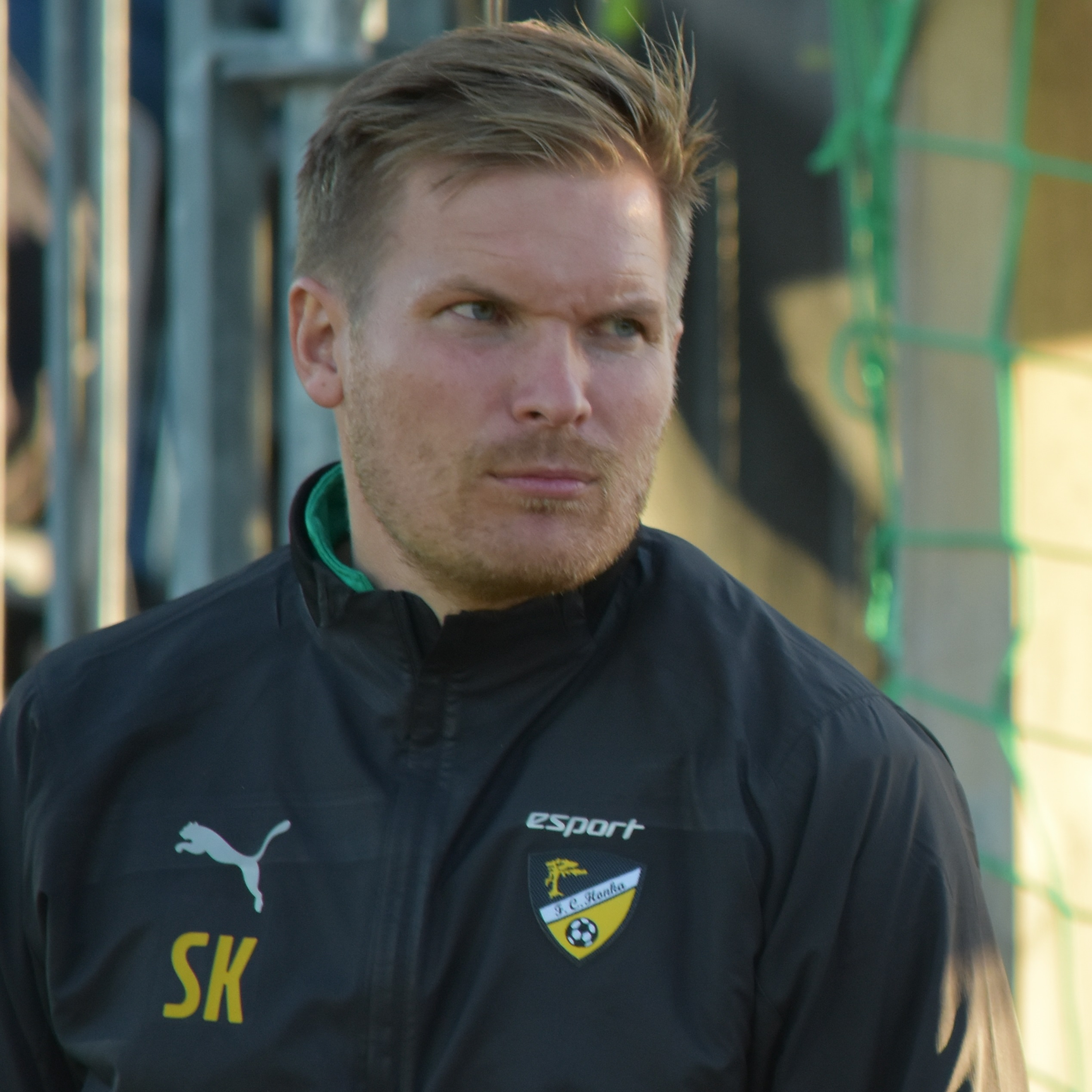
- Koskinen in 2018

Personal information
- Date of birth: 1 March 1979 (age 47)
- Place of birth: Kirkkonummi, Finland
- Height: 1.80 m (5 ft 11 in)
- Position: Defender

Youth career
- KyIF

Senior career*
Years	Team	Apps	(Gls)
1999–2001	Honka	21	(2)
2001–2002	Jokerit	13	(0)
2002	RBC Roosendaal	13	(0)
2003–2004	IFK Göteborg	1	(0)
2004–2005	→ Boden (loan)	11	(1)
2005–2006	Honka	22	(0)
2007	Sandefjord	8	(0)
2008–2013	Honka	125	(4)
2014	HJK	0	(0)

Managerial career
- 2015–2023: Honka (assistant)
Medal record
Honka
Runner-up	Finnish Cup	2008
Runner-up	Veikkausliiga	2008
Runner-up	Veikkausliiga	2009
Winner	Finnish League Cup	2010
Winner	Finnish League Cup	2011
Winner	Finnish Cup	2012
- * Club domestic league appearances and goals

Sampo Koskinen (born 1 March 1979) is a Finnish football coach and a former professional footballer. As a player, he spent most of his career in his native country with FC Honka. He also played for Eliteserien side Sandefjord Fotball, in the Netherlands for RBC Roosendaal and for Swedish clubs IFK Göteborg and Boden.

== Honours ==
Individual

- Veikkausliiga Player of the Month: June 2012
