= Yigal Antebi =

Israeli football player

Yigal Antebi יגאל אנטבי
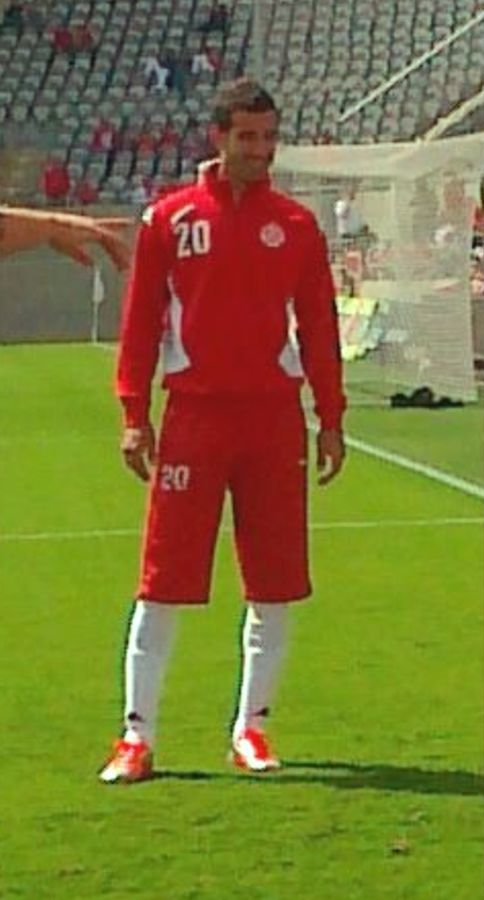

Personal information
- Date of birth: 1 August 1974 (age 52)
- Place of birth: Tel Aviv, Israel
- Height: 1.87 m (6 ft 1 1/2 in)
- Position: Left back

Youth career
- 1981–1986: A.S. Ramat Eliyahu
- 1986–1993: Maccabi Tel Aviv

Senior career*
Years	Team	Apps	(Gls)
1993–1994	Maccabi Herzliya	21	(0)
1994–1995	Hapoel Ramat Gan		
1995–1996	Sektzia Ness Ziona		
1996–1999	Hapoel Herzliya	65	(4)
1999–2009	Hapoel Tel Aviv	308	(9)
2009–2010	Maccabi Netanya	11	(0)
2010–2012	Hapoel Petah Tikva	33	(1)
2012–2014	Hapoel Tel Aviv	36	(0)
2015–2016	Hapoel Nahlat Yehuda	25	(0)

International career
2002–2007	Israel	11	(0)

Managerial career
- 2018–2019: Hapoel Afula
- 2019–2020: Hapoel Herzliya
- 2021: Hapoel Ramat HaSharon
- 2022–2023: Maccabi Sha'arayim
- * Club domestic league appearances and goals

Yigal Antebi (Hebrew: יגאל אנטבי; born August 1, 1974, in Rishon LeZion) is an Israeli former football player who now manages.

== Career ==
He played in Hapoel Tel Aviv for 10 years and for the Israel national team for 5 years.

Antebi started his senior career in Maccabi Herzliya and later on, he moved to Hakoah Ramat Gan. in 1999, he signed in Hapoel Tel Aviv and in the same year he won the "Double" (Israel league champion's and the Israeli Cup).

He has won 11 caps in the Israel national team and made 1 assist.

== Career statistics ==
=== International ===
Appearances and goals by national team and year
National team	Year	Apps	Goals
Israel	2002	2	0
Israel	2003	2	1
Israel	2004	5	0
Israel	2005	–	
Israel	2006	–	
Israel	2007	2	0
Total		11	0

== Honours ==
- Israeli Premier League (1):
  - 1999–00
- Israel State Cup (4):
  - 2000, 2006, 2007, 2012
- Toto Cup (1):
  - 2001–02
