= Honker =

Honker or Honkers can refer to:

== Anatomical features ==
- A nose
- Breasts

== The arts ==
- Honkers (Sesame Street), characters in the children's show
- Canada goose, sometimes referred to by the slang term "honker"

== Engineering and technology ==
- Tarpan Honker, a Polish all-terrain vehicle
- Vehicle horn

== Groups ==
- Honker Union, a Chinese activist group
- Rochester Honkers, an amateur baseball team in Minnesota, US

== Locations ==
- Hong Kong, sometimes referred to by the Australian or Oxford slang term "Honkers"
