= TrueCar =

American car buying website

TRUECar, Inc.
- Type: Private
- Traded as: Nasdaq: TRUE (former)
- Industry: Car retailing website
- Founded: February 2005; 21 years ago (as Zag.com)
- Founders: Scott Painter; Tom Taira
- Headquarters: Santa Monica, California, U.S.
- Key people: Scott Painter (CEO)
- Products: Pricing and information for new and used cars
- Revenue: US$ 175.6 million (2024)
- Owner: Fair Holdings, Inc.
- Website: truecar.com

TRUECar, Inc. is an American car listing company headquartered in Santa Monica, California. It also maintains a sales office in Austin, Texas.

== History ==
=== 2005–2010: Early years ===
TRUECar was originally incorporated under the name "Zag.com Inc." in Delaware in February 2005. Scott Painter and Tom Taira started the business to provide white-label auto-buying programs to affinity groups.

Its initial partner was Capital One in order for its customers to arrange financing, access upfront pricing, and locate inventory online. Other noted co-founders include Jim Nguyen, Oded Noy, and Bernie Brenner.

After a year of development, Painter and Taira introduced TRUECar during Techcrunch's Startup Battlefield in 2008, launching it as a separate company from Zag.com. TRUECar gathers automotive retail transaction data from thousands of sources in order to enable consumers "to see what's paid" on any vehicle in the US. The two companies merged in 2010.

=== 2011–2014: Pre-IPO ===
In January 2011, TRUECar released ClearBook, a used vehicle index that analyzes the used car market in the same way TRUECar did for new cars. In May, it acquired News Corp-backed Honk.com, a social car shopping platform.

In late 2011, it launched a television advertising campaign with commercials promoting its services. Shortly thereafter, TRUECar faced backlash from the automotive industry, when several state agencies and regulators notified TRUECar that its practices were noncompliant with some state laws.

In response to those notices, TRUECar overhauled its pricing structure, and moved from a pay-per-sale model to a performance-adjusted subscription model for dealers in some states. Meanwhile, in August, it acquired ALG, a company that provides information on future residual values of vehicles.

In a $150 million deal announced in January 2012, the company entered into an exclusive three-year partnership with Yahoo!, taking over and replacing its automotive services with its own solution.

TRUECar launched the first all-female racing team in 2012, with support from Penske Media Corporation and Dragon Racing. In June, The Virgin Group announced its partnership in support of TRUECar's "Women Empowered" initiative.

On May 16, 2014, TRUECar became publicly traded on NASDAQ under the stock ticker symbol TRUE.

=== 2015–2019: Chip Perry Era ===
In 2015, 108 car dealerships sued TRUECar for false advertising of its non-negotiation policy and for violations of the Lanham Act; four years later, a federal judge dismissed the lawsuit. In July 2017, two years after former AutoTrader.com CEO Chip Perry replaced Painter in the same role at the company, it was reported that TRUECar's dealership network grew by more than 24% quarterly compared to the previous year.

In December 2017, TRUECar and the California New Car Dealers Association settled a lawsuit that the association had brought against TRUECar in 2015. In its lawsuit, the association had alleged that TRUECar's billing model violated California law. As part of the settlement, TRUECar agreed to modify its billing model in California.

Shortly after disappointing first quarter results in 2019, TRUECar announced the immediate resignations of the accountable senior executives, including CEO Chip Perry, CTO/CPO Tommy McClung, CMO Neeraj Gunsager, and EVP Brian Skutta. Also in 2019, some investors in TRUECar sued the company for misleading shareholders.

=== 2020–present ===
In May 2020, having launched a new brand identity and redesign four months earlier, TRUECar announced a program focused on active military members designed to help offset its loss of the USAA Car Buying Service. With over 250 affinity partners, it announced a restructuring, that same month, including layoffs of 30% of its workforce.

On June 14, 2023, CEO Michael Darrow resigned as CEO. The company's CFO, Jantoon Reigersman took over as CEO and laid off 24% of the company's employees.

On January 21, 2026, it was announced that Fair Holdings, Inc. had completed the purchase of TRUECar in a take-private transaction. Fair Holdings is a company formed by a group of investors led by co-founder Painter and which has Zurich North America and AutoNation as some of its partners. In February of that years they laid off 30% their workforce.

== See also ==
- Kelley Blue Book
- CarGurus
