= Juuso Honka =

Finnish ice hockey player

- Born: March 11, 1990 (age 36) Turku, Finland
- Height: 6 ft 3 in (191 cm)
- Weight: 187 lb (85 kg; 13 st 5 lb)
- Position: Forward
- Shoots: Left
- SM-liiga team: HPK
- Playing career: 2010–present

Juuso Honka (born March 11, 1990) is a Finnish professional ice hockey player who played with HPK in the SM-liiga during the 2010–11 season.
