= Igor Grkajac =

Serbian footballer

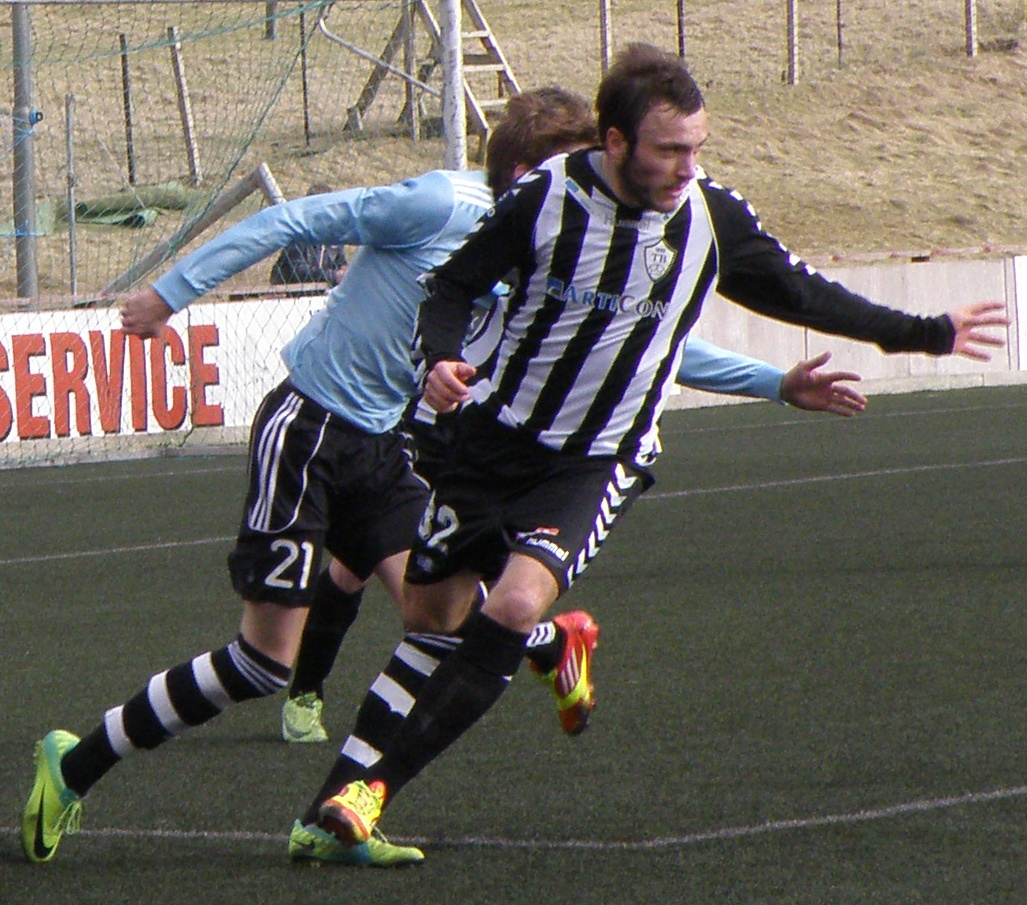
- Grkajac with Tvøroyrar Bóltfelag in March 2012

Personal information
- Full name: Igor Grkajac
- Date of birth: 26 April 1987 (age 39)
- Place of birth: Kraljevo, SFR Yugoslavia
- Height: 1.81 m (5 ft 11 1/2 in)
- Position: Forward

Senior career*
Years	Team	Apps	(Gls)
2005–2007	Sloga Kraljevo	29	(13)
2005–2006	→ Rudar Baljevac (loan)		
2007–2008	Metalac GM	4	(0)
2008	→ Mladost Lučani (loan)	15	(4)
2008–2010	Borac Čačak	44	(4)
2010	Novi Pazar	11	(2)
2011–2012	Smederevo	5	(0)
2011	→ Kolubara (loan)	16	(4)
2012	→ TB Tvøroyri (loan)	12	(3)
2013	Bane	14	(3)
2013–2014	Timok	10	(1)
2014	Mačva Šabac	9	(2)
2015–2016	Sloga Kraljevo	24	(4)
2016–2017	Victoria Wanderers		
2017	Radnički Pirot	9	(1)
2018–2019	Tutin		
2019	Borac Čačak		
2020	Ulaanbaatar City		
2021-2022	Takovo		
2023	Bane		
- * Club domestic league appearances and goals

Igor Grkajac (Serbian Cyrillic: Игор Гркајац; born 26 April 1987) is a Serbian professional footballer who last played as a striker for Ulaanbaatar City in Mongolia.

== Career ==
=== Club career ===
In January 2020, Grkajac joined Ulaanbaatar City in Mongolia under newly hired Serbian coach Vojislav Bralušić.
