= Chip Perry =

- Education: University of Virginia, Harvard Business School
- Occupations: President and chief executive officer of TrueCar, Inc.
- Known for: Online auto retail entrepreneurship

Victor A. Perry, better known as Chip Perry, is the former founding president and CEO of AutoTrader.com from 1997 to 2013.

== Education ==
Perry holds a degree in Civil Engineering from University of Virginia, and earned an MBA, in 1980, from Harvard Business School.

== Career ==
In 1997, Perry was the first employee of AutoTrader.com, and was CEO until 2013. In that time, AutoTrader became the largest third-party vehicle shopping website, with over $1.5 billion in annual revenue. As CEO, Perry oversaw a series of acquisitions at AutoTrader, including Kelley Blue Book, VinSolutions, vAuto and HomeNet Automotive, companies that are now part of the Cox Automotive group. Before joining AutoTrader, Perry worked in Los Angeles for the consulting firm McKinsey & Co. and at the business development arm of the Los Angeles Times. After leaving AutoTrader in 2013, Perry was president and CEO of RentPath.

Perry joined TrueCar as CEO on December 15, 2015, and resigned May 31, 2019.
