= Honk (website) =

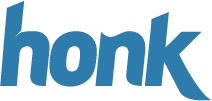
- Type: Private
- Founded: 1 January 2009; 21 January 2014
- Headquarters: San Francisco, CA
- Key people: Tom Taira; Stephanie LaCrosse
- Website: www.honk.com

Honk was a social automotive website developer headquartered in San Francisco, California. The company was co-founded by Tom Taira and Stephanie LaCrosse in 2009 to develop web, and mobile solutions that enabled consumers to choose a car.

== History ==
Honk operated Honk.com, a website that featured user-generated car reviews, new car pricing information, and several social shopping features. A beta version of Honk.com was launched in November 2009.

Honk’s “social recommendation engine” enabled consumers to find recommendations on cars based on their demographic and psychographic backgrounds. Using its social search tool, Honk users could input their age, sex, favorite hobbies, etc. and the social recommendation engine then looked to see which car models were most preferred by other people with the same characteristics. The Honk database featured anonymous data from several hundred thousand automobile shoppers and buyers in the United States.

Honk.com was acquired by TrueCar in May 2011.
