= Thierry Steimetz =

French footballer (1983–2026)

Personal information
- Date of birth: 9 July 1983
- Place of birth: Creutzwald, France
- Date of death: 11 January 2026 (aged 42)
- Place of death: Ham-sous-Varsberg, France
- Height: 1.65 m (5 ft 5 in)
- Position: Midfielder

Senior career*
Years	Team	Apps	(Gls)
2001–2003	Lens B	33	(5)
2003–2005	Roye	52	(10)
2005–2008	Forbach	?	(?)
2008–2009	Grevenmacher	26	(6)
2009–2012	Amnéville	72	(25)
2012	Metz	10	(0)
2012–2014	F91 Dudelange	44	(16)
2014–2017	FC Homburg	50	(13)
- * Club domestic league appearances and goals

Thierry Steimetz (9 July 1983 – 11 January 2026) was a French professional footballer who played as a midfielder.

== Career ==
In July 2012, Steimetz joined Luxembourgish club F91 Dudelange. He scored two goals away in a UEFA Champions League second qualifying round second leg match against Red Bull Salzburg to help his side to a famous victory. Despite losing 3–4 on the night in Austria, the aggregate result ended up 4–4, and Dudelange progressed on the away goal rule.

At the age of 33, during his time at German club FC Homburg, Steimetz had to have his right leg amputated after a malignant tumour was discovered and he retired from playing.

== Death ==
Steimetz died in Ham-sous-Varsberg from cancer on 11 January 2026, at the age of 42.
