= Ondřej Honka =

Czech footballer

Personal information
- Date of birth: 20 April 1986 (age 40)
- Place of birth: Czechoslovakia
- Position: Forward

Senior career*
Years	Team	Apps	(Gls)
2005–2006	Sparta Prague B		
2006	Viktoria Plzeň	3	(0)
2006–2008	Slovácko	5	(0)
2008–2009	Slavia Prague B		
2009–2010	Hlučín		

International career^{‡}
2001–2002	Czech Republic U-16	4	(2)
2002–2003	Czech Republic U-17	18	(1)
2003–2004	Czech Republic U-18	10	(1)
2004	Czech Republic U-19	1	(0)
- * Club domestic league appearances and goals as of 9 May 2010 ‡ National team caps and goals as of 3 June 2011

Ondřej Honka (born 20 April 1986) is a footballer from the Czech Republic. He has represented his country at youth level.
