= Honka Monka =

Nightclub in Queens, New York

The Honka Monka was a nightclub in the Sunnyside neighborhood of Queens, New York. It was originally opened by Marvin Gray in 1969 as a Latin club, but soon rock and soul acts were booked for the club. Acts who performed at the club include Ike & Tina Turner, Wilson Pickett, Little Richard, and Aesop's Fables.

== History ==
Marvin Gray opened the Honka Monka on Queens Boulevard near 40th Street in January 1969. In 1970, Gray was co-founded a record company, Grande Records, which specialized in rock and soul music. He sometimes promoted acts from the label at the club. Gray spent six months designing the club whose name derived from a hotel at which he had visited in Japan. He intended the Honka Monka to be a Latin club after producing Latin shows in nearby theaters, but the audience who came were unfamiliar with Latin dances so he switched booked rock bands instead.

In July 1970, Ike & Tina Turner performed at the club. They were photographed by Bob Gruen who was yet to launch his career as a rock photographer.

Returning to his first love of Latin music, Gray imposed a Latin policy which from Friday through Sunday, Latin bands only performed. Eddie Palmieri's orchestra and the LeBrón Brothers orchestra are some bands that performed at the Honka Monka.
