= Jaakko Lepola =

Finnish footballer (born 1990)

Personal information
- Date of birth: 14 March 1990 (age 36)
- Place of birth: Espoo, Finland
- Height: 1.78 m (5 ft 10 in)
- Position: Midfielder

Youth career
- FC Honka

Senior career*
Years	Team	Apps	(Gls)
2008–2011	Honka	70	(7)
2012	Lahti	14	(0)
2013	Gnistan	20	(2)
2014	SoVo		
2015–2017	Espoo	10	(1)
2018	Helsinki IFK	2	(0)
2019–2020	Gnistan	0	(0)
2019	→ KäPa (loan)	16	(1)
2020–2022	PK-35	20	(0)

International career
	Finland U17	6	(2)
	Finland U19	6	(2)
2010	Finland U21	4	(0)
- * Club domestic league appearances and goals as of 15:48, 21 June 2022 (UTC)

Jaakko Lepola (born 14 March 1990) is a Finnish professional footballer who plays as a midfielder.

== Career ==
After his contract with FC Honka expired after the 2011 season, he signed a 1+1 year contract with FC Lahti

On 29 May 2019, Lepola was loaned out from IF Gnistan to KäPa.

On 11 January 2020, Lepola joined PK-35 in Kakkonen.
