= Jarkko Värttö =

Finnish footballer (born 1989)

Personal information
- Date of birth: 24 February 1989 (age 37)
- Place of birth: Espoo, Finland
- Height: 1.78 m (5 ft 10 in)
- Position: Defender

Senior career*
Years	Team	Apps	(Gls)
–2008	Grankulla IFK		
2009	Honka	0	(0)
2009–2010	Lahti	31	(0)
2011–2013	IFK Mariehamn	47	(0)

International career
	Finland U21	3	(0)
- * Club domestic league appearances and goals as of 4 November 2011

Jarkko Värttö (born 24 February 1989) is a Finnish football player currently playing for IFK Mariehamn.
