= Jarkko Okkonen =

Finnish footballer (born 1978)

Personal information
- Date of birth: 8 September 1978 (age 48)
- Place of birth: Oulu, Finland
- Height: 1.83 m (6 ft 0 in)
- Position: Defender

Senior career*
| Years | Team | Apps | (Gls) |
| 1998–2008 | FC Haka | 232 | (9) |
| 2009 | VaKP | ? | (?) |
| 2010–2011 | JJK Jyväskylä | 34 | (2) |
- * Club domestic league appearances and goals

Jarkko Okkonen (born 8 September 1978) is a Finnish former professional football defender.
