= 2013 Finnish Cup =

2013 Suomen Cup
Tournament details
- Country: Finland
- Teams: 152

Final positions
- Champions: RoPS

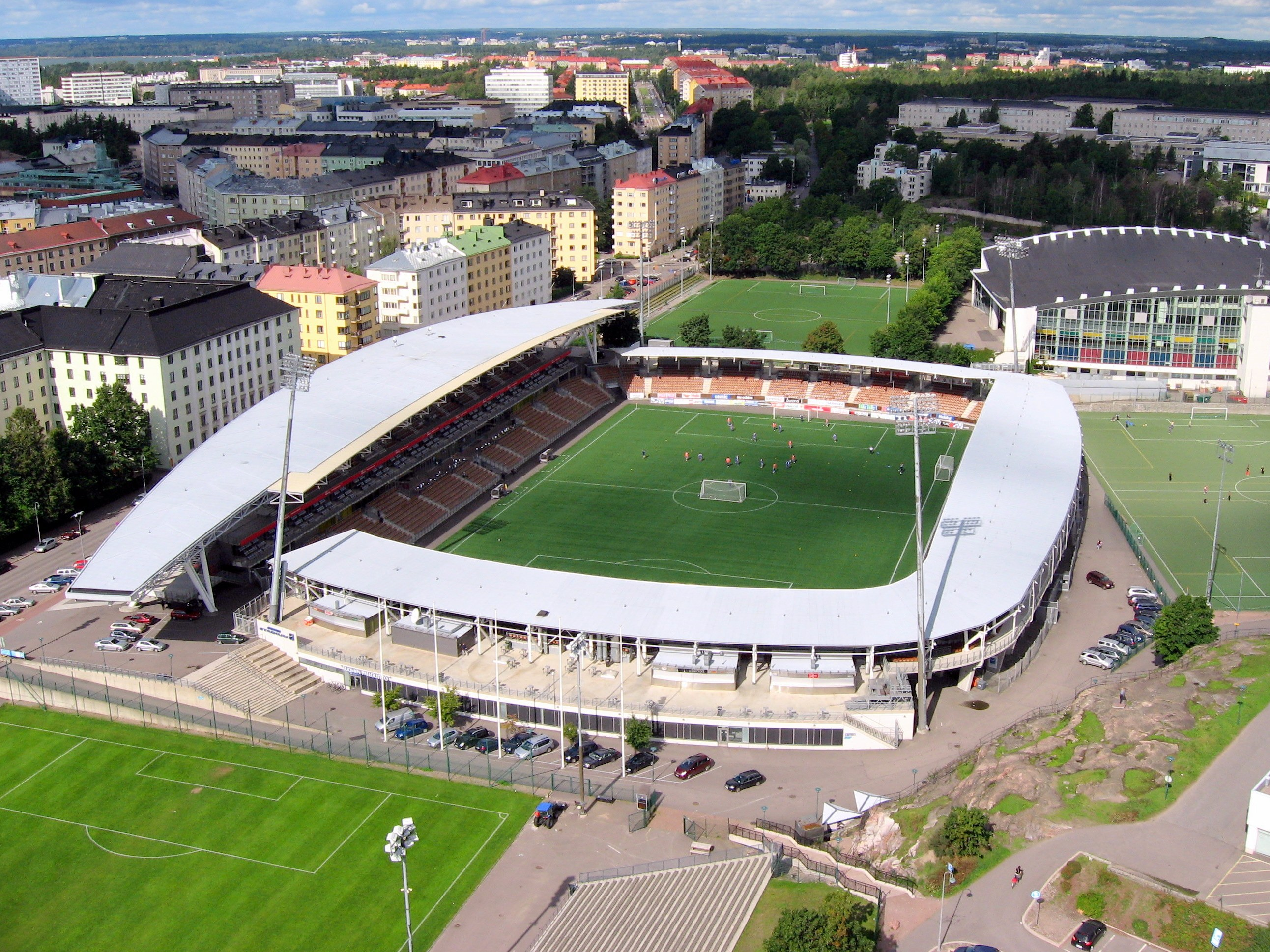
Sonera Stadium, Helsinki - usual venue for the Suomen Cup final

The 2013 Finnish Cup (Finnish: Suomen Cup) is the 59th season of the main annual association football cup competition in Finland. It is organised as a single-elimination knock–out tournament. Participation in the competition is voluntary. A total of 152 teams registered for the competition, with 12 teams from the Veikkausliiga, 8 from the Ykkönen, 31 from the Kakkonen, 54 from the Kolmonen and 101 teams from other divisions.

The tournament started on 5 January 2012 with the first match of Round 1. Many matches in the early rounds are played on artificial pitches in indoor halls.

== Teams ==
Round	Clubs remaining	Clubs involved	Winners from previous round	New entries this round	Leagues entering at this round
Round 1	152	70	none	70	Kolmonen (Tier 4); Nelonen (Tier 5); Vitonen (Tier 6); Kutonen (Tier 7); Seiska (Tier 8)
Round 2	117	66	35	31	see above
Round 3	84	72	33	39	Ykkönen (Tier 2) - 8 teams Kakkonen (Tier 3) - 31 teams
Round 4	48	40	36	4	Veikkausliiga (Tier 1) - 4 teams
Round 5	28	24	20	4	Veikkausliiga (Tier 1) - 4 teams
Round 6	16	16	12	4	Veikkausliiga (Tier 1) - 4 teams
Quarterfinals	8	8	8	none	none
Semi-finals	4	4	4	none	none
Final	2	2	2	none	none

== Round 1 ==
In this round 70 clubs entered from the Finnish fourth level and below, while the other 31 clubs from the lower divisions received byes to the next round. These matches took place between 5 January 2013 and 5 February 2013.

Tie no	Home team	Score	Away team	Information
1	PPJ Akatemia	2–1	SUMU/2	
2	FC Spede	8–7 (p.)	FC Kontu/2	
3	FC Playmates	0–9	FC Viikingit/2	
4	HJK/Kannelmäki	1–4	HPS/2	
5	Töölön Taistu	7–0	Helsingin Ponnistus	
6	SUMU	0–5	IF Gnistan/Ogeli	
7	IF Gnistan/2	3–2	MPS/Atletico Akatemia	
8	Friska Viljor	0–8	JBK	
9	HerTo	3–1	MaKu/FC Myllypuro	
10	Töölön Vesa	5–0	FC HEIV	
11	MPS/Atletico Malmi	1–5	FC Kontu	
12	HIFK/2	5–1	FC KaKe	
13	SAPA/2	0–3	PPV	
14	NuPS	4–0	Lahen Pojat JS	
15	PP-70	1–4	Nekalan Pallo	
16	Paimion Haka	0–6	VG-62	
17	Haminan Pallo-Kissat	4–0	Kultsu FC	
18	Purha/2	5–4 (p.)	PEPO Lappeenranta	

Tie no	Home team	Score	Away team	Information
19	MynPa	5–3 (p.)	Åbo Club de Futbol	
20	Popinniemen Ponnistus	4–1	Karhulan Pojat	
21	Toivalan Urheilijat	0–6	SC Kufu-98	
22	TuPS	2–1	KyIF	
23	Valkealan Kajo	2–1	Sudet/3	
24	Konneveden Urheilijat	1–5	Joensuun Palloseura	
25	FC LP	0–13	SexyPöxyt	
26	NJS	2–4 (p.)	RiPS	
27	VaKP	7–6 (p.)	Mäntän Valo	
28	Apollo	0–1	EBK	
29	Jags	3–0	Kristallipalatsi	
30	IF Sibbo-Vargarna	2–0	Nopsa	
31	Nakkilan Nasta	1–2	FC Boda	
32	FC Espoo	5–3	PK-35/VJS Akatemia	
33	Edsevö Bollklubb	0–7	IFK Jakobstad	
34	Sisu-Pallo	2–0	GBK/2	
35	TamU-K	3–0	Ikurin Vire	

== Round 2 ==
In this round 66 clubs participated from the Finnish fourth level and below. These matches commenced on 27 January 2013.

Tie no	Home team	Score	Away team	Information
36	Colo-Colo	1–3	HIFK/3	
37	FC Hieho	1–2	SAPA M1	
38	Malmin Ponnistajat	4–0	HJK-j/Laajasalo	
39	Orimattilan Pedot	5–2 (p.)	Reipas Lahti	
40	SC Riverball	2–0	Kajaanin Haka	
41	Popinniemen Ponnistus	1–6	FC Peltirumpu	
42	IF Sibbo-Vargarna	3–5	HyPS	
43	Pallo-Pojat juniorit (PPJ)	0–6	HPS	
44	HIFK/4	2–4	PPV	
45	IF Gnistan/2	2–3	FC Kiffen 08	
46	MynPa	4–1	VG-62	
47	Haminan Pallo-Kissat	1–2	PaPe	
48	FC Rauma	0–4	FC Boda	
49	FC Spede	4–5 (p.)	JFC Helsinki	
50	ParVi	1–3	Nekalan Pallo	
51	SC KuFu-98	3–0	JoPS	
52	Sisu-Pallo	4–5 (p.)	IFK Jakobstad	

Tie no	Home team	Score	Away team	Information
53	I-HK/OMV	10–9 (p.)	SexyPöxyt	
54	Riipilän Raketti	1–3	TuPS	
55	TamU-K	0–1	VaKP	
56	Tervakosken Pato	2–1	Jags	
57	Purha/2	4–3	Valkealan Kajo	
58	EBK	2–0	RiPS	
59	Töölön Taisto	5–2	IF Gnistan/Ogeli	
60	KPR	0–13	HIFK/2	
61	HPS/2	0–1	PPJ/Akatemia	
62	Töölön Vesa	1–4	FC Kontu	
63	FC Muurola	5–1	Spartak Kajaani	
64	Black Islanders	3–5 (p.)	Äänekosken Huima	
65	FC POHU/Simpsons	0–11	FC Viikingit/2	
66	Ajax Sarkkiranta	0–3	JBK	
67	Ponnistajat/2	0–3	HerTo	
68	NuPS	6–7 (p.)	FC Espoo	

== Round 3 ==
In this round 72 clubs participated, including 8 teams from the Ykkönen and 31 teams from the Kakkonen . These matches commenced on 20 February 2013.

Tie no	Home team	Score	Away team	Information
69	GBK	3–0	KPV	
70	Töölön Taisto	0–1	EIF	
71	JBK	3–0	AC Oulu	
72	FC Kontu	4–2 (a.e.t.)	EBK	
73	SAPA M1	0–4	LC Lahti Akatemia	
74	SC KuFu-98	8–0	SC Riverball	
75	JFC Helsinki	0–6	IF Gnistan	
76	HerTo	0–6	PK-35 Vantaa	
77	Malmin Ponnistajat	0–4	EsPa	
78	FC Santa Claus	1–2	PK-37	
79	PS Kemi	2–1	AC Kajaani	
80	MynPa	0–3	FC Jazz	
81	Masku	2–1	SalPa	
82	IFK Jakobstad	1–0	Äänekosken Huima	
83	Orimattilan Pedot	0–1	Atlantis FC	
84	PPV	1–3 (a.e.t.)	BK-46	
85	VaKP	2−1	Tervakosken Pato	
86	TuPS	0–4	PK Keski-Uusimaa	

Tie no	Home team	Score	Away team	Information
87	FC Espoo	0–2	HIFK	
88	FC Boda	1–5	Pallo-Iirot	
89	FC Peltirumpu	0–6	KTP	
90	HIFK/2	0–6	LPS	
91	FC Haka	2–0	Ilves	
92	TPV	6–1	FC Hämeenlinna	
93	Nekalan Pallo	2–3	Hämeenlinnan Härmä	
94	FC Viikingit/2	4–2 (a.e.t.)	JäPS	
95	I-HK/OMV	0–4	KäPa	
96	Purha/2	0–5	Sudet	
97	HIFK/3	0–9	Pallohonka	
98	HPS	1−2	FC Futura	
99	MP	1–2	JIPPO	
100	PPJ/Akatemia	0–7	Klubi-04	
101	PaPe	0–7	FC KooTeePee	
102	Vasa IFK	1–0	SJK	
103	HyPS	0–1	FC Kiffen 08	
104	FC Muurola	0–8	TP-47	

== Round 4 ==
In this round 40 clubs will participate, including 4 teams from the Veikkausliiga (Teams which have been eliminated from the League Cup). These matches commenced on 16 March 2013.

16 March 2013 105	FC Kontu	0 − 3	FC KooTeePee	Talin jalkapallohalli, Helsinki
14:00			Camara 20'; Veija 80'; Kaakinen 90+1'	Referee: Mikko Mörö

16 March 2013 106	SC KuFu-98	1 − 4	TP-47	Kuopio-halli, Kuopio
20:30	Kolari 85'		Pyyny 19'; Wilson 36'; Wilson 68'; Gullsten 81'	Referee: Ville Nevalainen

17 March 2013 107	Masku	0 − 4	FC Haka	Karvetin tekonurmi, Naantali
16:15			Petrescu 22'; Zézé 27'; Matrone 29'; Salonen 76'	Attendance: 153; Referee: Ville Käldström

22 March 2013 108	Hämeenlinnan Härmä	0 − 7	FC Jazz	Säästöpankki Areena, Hämeenlinna
20:00			Santahuhta 20'; Vihtilä 47'; Koivunen 55'; Koivunen 70'; Vihtilä 77'; Tuuri 82'; Pihlainen 89'	Attendance: 98; Referee: Atte Jussila

23 March 2013 109	LPS	3 − 1	EIF	Talin jalkapallohalli, Helsinki
8:30	Arolinna 16'; Kaplas 20'; Viljamaa 75'		Sevon 30'	Referee: Jussi Vainikka

23 March 2013 110	JBK	1 − 2 (a.e.t.)	PS Kemi	Tellushallen, Jakobstad
13:00	Korkea-Aho 102'		Eissele 115'; Eissele 116'	Referee: Ville Käldström

23 March 2013 111	LC Lahti Akatemia	0 − 1	PK-35 Vantaa	Lahden kisapuisto, Lahti
13:30			Inutile 90'	Attendance: 102; Referee: Marko Lindberg

23 March 2013 112	TPV	2 − 0	Pallo-Iirot	Tampere Exhibition and Sports Centre, Tampere
16:15	Koroma 15'; Muhumud 72'			Referee: Veli-Matti Kanerva

23 March 2013 113	Atlantis FC	3 − 4 (a.e.t.)	BK-46	Töölön Pallokenttä, Helsinki
18:00	Solomon 4'; Solomon 67'; Solomon 82'		Siikala 33'; Stevens 59'; Luoto 90'; Stevens 98'	Attendance: 86; Referee: Miikka Raininko

24 March 2013 114	IFK Jakobstad	0 − 8	GBK	Tellushallen, Jakobstad
18:30			Roiko 16'; Aho 22'; Melarti 53'; Melarti 58'; Wargh 61'; Huuhka 74'; Roiko 76'; Melarti 90'	Attendance: 130; Referee: Daniel Enkvist

24 March 2013 115	FC Kiffen 08	2 − 3	KäPa	Talin jalkapallohalli, Helsinki
20:00				Referee: Ifeoma Kulmala

25 March 2013 116	VaKP	0 − 9	FC Inter Turku	Sahara, Valkeakoski
19:30			Gnabouyou 12'; Paajanen 40'; Sirbiladze 43'; Gnabouyou 55'; Duah 59'; Sirbiladze 77'; Camara 81'; Camara 88'; Diallo 90'	Attendance: 200; Referee: Marko Lindberg

27 March 2013 117	IF Gnistan	1 − 1 (a.e.t.) (1 – 2 p)	Pallohonka	Fair Pay Areena, Helsinki
19:30	Koskinen 12'		Sipinen 34'	Referee: Mikko Mörö

27 March 2013 118	HIFK	1 − 2	Klubi-04	Talin jalkapallohalli, Helsinki
20:00	Hänninen 15'		Khayat 21'; Puro 87'	Attendance: 351; Referee: Miikka Raininko

28 March 2013 119	Vasa IFK	0 − 2	VPS	Botnia-halli, Korsholm
19:00			Parikka 36'; Lomski 68'	Attendance: 612; Referee: Suad Lulic

1 April 2013 120	PK-37	0 − 2	JIPPO	Savon Sanomat Areena, Kuopio
12:30			Baboucarr 26'; Chidi 45'	Attendance: 120; Referee: Anton Mustonen

1 April 2013 121	EsPa	0 − 2	IFK Mariehamn	Matinkylän uusi tekonurmi, Espoo
15:00			Forsell 20'; Forsell 40'	Referee: Juho Luukkanen

3 April 2013 122	FC Futura	1 − 5	FC Honka	Tapiolan Urheilupuisto, Espoo
18:30	Britschgi 39'		Kastrati 33'; Mäkijärvi 48'; Anyamele 61'; Kastrati 81'; Vasara 90+1'	Referee: Jari Pylvänäinen

3 April 2013 123	KTP	2 − 0	Sudet	Saviniemi, Kouvola
18:30	Gomez-Marttila 6'; Nieminen 45+1'			Attendance: 238; Referee: Joonas Pulkkinen

3 April 2013 124	FC Viikingit/2	1 − 0	PK Keski-Uusimaa	Kalevan urheilupuisto, Kerava
19:05	Ahonen 41'			Referee: Sami Katko

== Round 5 ==
In this round 24 clubs will participate, including 4 teams from the Veikkausliiga. These matches commenced on 5 April 2013.

5 April 2013 125	HJK	2 – 1	FF Jaro	Talin jalkapallohalli, Helsinki
17:00	Moren 22'; Schüller 82'		Kullström 44'	Attendance: 348; Referee: Toni Ollikainen

6 April 2013 126	LPS	1 – 1 (a.e.t.) (5 – 6 p)	JIPPO	Fair Pay Areena, Helsinki
14:00	Viljamaa 51'		Uhmo 3'	Attendance: 85; Referee: Juho Luukkanen

6 April 2013 127	RoPS	2 – 2 (a.e.t.) (5 – 3 p)	FC Inter Turku	Rovaniemen keskuskenttä, Rovaniemi
15:00	Obilor 35'; Maisonvaara 47'		Duah 40'; Bouwman 90+4'	Attendance: 604; Referee: Ville Nevalainen

7 April 2013 128	KTP	0 – 4	IFK Mariehamn	Kymenlaakson Sähkö Stadion, Kouvola
14:00			Forsell 29'; Jokihaara 71'; Adlam 85'; Östlind 90+2'	Attendance: 347; Referee: Mikko Mörö

9 April 2013 129	PK-35 Vantaa	1 – 2	VPS	ISS Stadion, Vantaa
16:30	Oravainen 76'		Parikka 33' (pen.); Parikka 85'	Attendance: 208; Referee: Marko Grönholm

9 April 2013 130	MyPa	0 – 1	FC Honka	Kymenlaakson Sähkö Stadion, Kouvola
18:30			Äijälä 18' (pen.)	Attendance: 449; Referee: Tommi Grönman

10 April 2013 131	FC Viikingit/2	0 – 1	FC Jazz	Kartanon tekonurmi, Helsinki
18:30			Koivunen 90+1'	Referee: Jussi Vainikka

13 April 2013 132	TP-47	2 – 4	TPV	Jungon kenttä, Kemi
11:30	Herala 1'; Herala 83'		Koroma 36'; Muhumud 45'; Koroma 60'; Rasva 90+4'	Attendance: 168; Referee: Petri Pahtakari

13 April 2013 133	PS Kemi	3 – 0	GBK	Jungon kenttä, Kemi
15:00	Ikäläinen 34'; Eissele 64'; Eissele 70'			Referee: Juha-Matti Kanniainen

17 April 2013 134	FC KooTeePee	2 – 1	Pallohonka	Karhulan keskuskenttä, Kotka
18:00	Tyyskä 1'; Järviniemi 85'		Mboma 81'	Attendance: 170; Referee: Pete Pokkinen

17 April 2013 135	FC Haka	4 – 0	KäPa	Sahara, Valkeakoski
18:00	Petrescu 43'; Petrescu 57'; Lindeman 85'; Zézé 90+3'			Referee: Atte Jussila

17 April 2013 136	Klubi-04	0 – 1	BK-46	Sonera Stadium, Helsinki
18:30			Rantala 57'	Attendance: 152; Referee: Joonas Kovapohja

== Round 6 ==
In this round 16 clubs will participate. These matches commenced on 25 April 2013.

24 April 2013 137	PS Kemi (3)	0 – 2	VPS (1)	Sauvosaari, Kemi
17:30			Koskimaa 48'; Lomski 73'	Attendance: 411; Referee: Juha-Matti Kanniainen

24 April 2013 138	TPV (3)	1 – 3	FC Haka (2)	Tammela Stadion, Tampere
18:30	Koroma 34'		Pirinen 32'; Petrescu 40'; Aalto 56'	Attendance: 707; Referee: Ville Nevalainen

25 April 2013 139	BK-46 (3)	0 – 0 (a.e.t.) (1 – 4 p)	JJK (1)	Karjaan tekonurmi, Raseborg
17:30				Attendance: 614; Referee: Tommi Grönman

25 April 2013 140	FC Jazz (3)	1 – 0	JIPPO (2)	Porin Stadion, Pori
18:00	Salo 56'			Attendance: 189; Referee: Miikka Lähdesmäki

25 April 2013 141	FC KooTeePee (2)	0 – 1	FC Honka (1)	Arto Tolsa Areena, Kotka
18:00			Baah 9'	Attendance: 275; Referee: Mikko Mörö

25 April 2013 142	TPS (1)	2 – 3 (a.e.t.)	IFK Mariehamn (1)	Veritas Stadion, Turku
18:00	Ääritalo 59'; Tanska 60'		Forsell 43', 93'; Orgill 70'	Attendance: 545; Referee: Vesa Hätilä

25 April 2013 143	FC Lahti (1)	1 – 2	KuPS (1)	Lahden Stadion, Lahti
18:30	Rafael 75'		Paananen 32'; Ilo 64'	Referee: Dennis Antamo

25 April 2013 144	RoPS (1)	1 – 0	HJK (1)	Rovaniemen keskuskenttä, Rovaniemi
18:30	Saxman 56'			Attendance: 1,387; Referee: Tero Nieminen

== Quarterfinals ==
In this round 8 clubs will participate. These matches commenced on 20 May 2013.

20 May 2013 145	FC Jazz (3)	0 – 3	RoPS (1)	Pori Stadium, Pori
			Mbachu 11', 38'; Kokko 90+3'	Attendance: 812; Referee: M. Lähdesmäki

20 May 2013 146	FC Honka (1)	1 – 2	IFK Mariehamn (1)	Tapiolan Urheilupuisto, Tapiola
	Kastrati 58'		Assis 53'; Orgill 80'	Attendance: 526; Referee: D. Antamo

20 May 2013 147	VPS (1)	0 – 2	JJK (1)	Hietalahti Stadium, Vaasa
			Wusu 76'; Poutiainen 84'	Attendance: 1218; Referee: V. Nevalainen

20 May 2013 148	FC Haka (2)	1 – 2 (a.e.t.)	KuPS (1)	Tehtaan kenttä, Valkeakoski
	Zézé 90'		Dudu 65'; Venäläinen 110' (pen.)	Attendance: 1354; Referee: M. Gestranius

== Semi-finals ==
17 August 2013 149	RoPS (1)	4 – 0	IFK Mariehamn (1)	Rovaniemen keskuskenttä, Rovaniemi
	Kokko 55'; Alison 59'; Lahtinen 61'; Priestley 90'			Attendance: 2184; Referee: P. Kari

17 August 2013 150	JJK (1)	0 – 1	KuPS (1)	Harjun stadion, Jyväskylä
			James 87'	Attendance: 2150; Referee: M. Lähdesmäki

== Final ==
=== Details ===
28 September 2013
15:30 EEST

RoPS	2–1	KuPS
Kokko 78' (pen.), 79'	Report	Voutilainen 90+1'

Sonera Stadion, Helsinki
Attendance: 4032
Referee: Antti Munukka

RoPS:
GK	12	(Finland) Oskari Forsman
DF	8	(Finland) Tuomo Könönen
DF	6	(Nigeria) Ndukaku Alison
DF	35	(Nigeria) Faith Friday Obilor
DF	23	(Finland) Antti Peura	(substituted off) 85'
MF	21	(Nigeria) Emenike
MF	10	(Finland) Nicholas Otaru
MF	55	(El Salvador) Víctor Turcios	(substituted off) 71'
MF	4	(Finland) Antti Okkonen
MF	9	(Finland) Mika Lahtinen
CF	11	(Finland) Aleksandr Kokko	(substituted off) 82'
Substitutions:
GK	1	(Finland) Tomi Maanoja
DF	2	(Finland) Albin Granlund	(substituted on) 82'
MF	13	(Finland) Joonas Pennanen
MF	16	(Finland) Ville Saxman
MF	17	(Finland) Olli Pöyliö
MF	25	(Trinidad and Tobago) Ataullah Guerra	(substituted on) 85'
MF	35	(Jamaica) Akeem Priestley	(substituted on) 71'
Head Coach:
(Finland) Kari Virtanen

KuPS:
GK	1	(Finland) Mika Hilander
DF	7	(Finland) Antti Hynynen
DF	28	(United States) Tyler Ruthven
DF	15	(The Gambia) Omar Colley
DF	32	(Finland) Tuomas Rannankari	(yellow card) 78'
MF	17	(The Gambia) Dawda Bah		(substituted off) 90+1'
MF	13	(Finland) Aleksi Paananen
MF	10	(Nigeria) Dudu	(red card) 52'
MF	11	(Estonia) Ats Purje		(substituted off) 84'
MF	29	(Finland) Juha Hakola
CF	27	(Finland) Ilja Venäläinen
Substitutions:
DF	4	(Finland) Tero Taipale
MF	6	(Finland) Saku Savolainen		(substituted on) 90+1'
MF	8	(Finland) Jerry Voutilainen		(substituted on) 84'
GK	12	(Hungary) Viktor Szentpéteri
MF	18	(Finland) Jussi Kujala
DF	19	(Finland) Rami Hakanpää
DF	23	(Cameroon) Etchu Tabe
Head Coach:
(Finland) Esa Pekonen
