= Jere Hiltunen =

Finnish footballer (born 1999)

Personal information
- Date of birth: 11 June 1999 (age 27)
- Position: Striker

Senior career*
Years	Team	Apps	(Gls)
2015	JIPPO	2	(0)
2016–2019	KuPS	13	(0)
2016	→ KuFu-98 (loan)	4	(1)
2017	→ KuFu-98 (loan)	3	(3)
2018	→ KuFu-98 (loan)	11	(1)
2019	→ KuFu-98 (loan)	16	(2)
2020–2021	JIPPO	41	(5)
- * Club domestic league appearances and goals as of 23 October 2021

Jere Hiltunen (born 11 June 1999) is a Finnish professional footballer who plays as a striker.
