= Arttu Heinonen =

Finnish footballer (born 1999)

Personal information
- Date of birth: 22 April 1999 (age 27)
- Place of birth: Oulu, Finland
- Height: 1.84 m (6 ft 0 in)
- Position: Midfielder

Team information
- Current team: KuPS
- Number: 17

Youth career
- –2019: KuPS

Senior career*
Years	Team	Apps	(Gls)
2017	PK-37	11	(3)
2018–2021	KuFu-98	34	(19)
2019–2021	KuPS	28	(1)
2022	Lahti	19	(1)
2022	→ Reipas Lahti	1	(0)
2023–	KuPS	73	(11)
- * Club domestic league appearances and goals as of 12 November 2026

Arttu Heinonen (born 22 April 1999) is a Finnish professional footballer who plays as a midfielder for Veikkausliiga club KuPS.

== Club career ==
Heinonen played in the youth sector of Kuopion Palloseura (KuPS), and debuted in the senior level in 2017 with associate club PK-37 in the third-tier Kakkonen. In 2019, Heinonen won the Finnish championship title with KuPS first team, and in 2021 they were crowned the Finnish Cup champions. He played in the KuPS organisation until the end of 2021, when he joined a fellow Veikkausliiga club FC Lahti for the 2022 season.

After a lone year in Lahti, Heinonen returned to KuPS. On 20 October 2023, he signed a two-year extension with the club until the end of 2025. In September 2024, Heinonen and KuPS won the Finnish Cup title, and in late October they won the Finnish championship title, completing the club's first-ever double.

== Career statistics ==
As of 19 January 2025

Appearances and goals by club, season and competition
Club	Season	League			Cup (Note: Includes Suomen Cup)		League cup (Note: Includes Finnish League Cup)		Europe		Total	
Club	Season	Division	Apps	Goals	Apps	Goals	Apps	Goals	Apps	Goals	Apps	Goals
PK-37	2017	Kakkonen	11	3	–		–		–		11	3
KuFu-98	2018	Kakkonen	12	4	–		–		–		12	4
KuFu-98	2019	Kakkonen	15	9	–		–		–		15	9
KuFu-98	2020	Kakkonen	6	5	–		–		–		6	5
KuFu-98	2021	Kakkonen	1	1	–		–		–		1	1
KuFu-98	Total		34	19	0	0	0	0	0	0	34	19
KuPS	2019	Veikkausliiga	8	0	0	0	–		0	0	8	0
KuPS	2020	Veikkausliiga	7	0	6	0	–		1 (Note: Includes UEFA Europa League)	0	14	0
KuPS	2021	Veikkausliiga	13	1	5	1	–		3 (Note: Includes UEFA Conference League)	0	21	2
KuPS	Total		28	1	11	1	0	0	4	0	43	2
Lahti	2022	Veikkausliiga	19	1	3	0	3	0	–		25	1
Reipas Lahti	2022	Kakkonen	1	0	–		–		–		1	0
KuPS	2023	Veikkausliiga	20	5	3	0	3	0	2	0	28	5
KuPS	2024	Veikkausliiga	23	5	5	0	6	1	3	1	37	7
KuPS	2025	Veikkausliiga	0	0	0	0	1	0	0	0	1	0
KuPS	Total		43	10	8	0	10	1	5	1	66	12
Career total			136	34	22	1	13	1	9	1	180	37

== Honours ==
KuPS

- Veikkausliiga: 2019, 2024
- Veikkausliiga runner-up: 2021, 2023
- Finnish Cup: 2021, 2024
- Finnish League Cup runner-up: 2024
