= Nuutti Tykkyläinen =

Finnish footballer (born 1999)

Personal information
- Full name: Nuutti Tykkyläinen
- Date of birth: 19 July 1999 (age 27)
- Place of birth: Joensuu, Finland
- Height: 1.80 m (5 ft 11 in)
- Position: Left-back

Team information
- Current team: Jippo
- Number: 21

Youth career
- Jippo
- 2016–2019: KuPS

Senior career*
Years	Team	Apps	(Gls)
2015	Jippo	13	(0)
2017–2019	KuFu-98	56	(4)
2017–2019	KuPS	1	(0)
2019	→ Jippo (loan)	7	(0)
2020–2021	Jippo	44	(9)
2022	PK-35	25	(2)
2023–	Jippo	87	(13)
- * Club domestic league appearances and goals as of 1 November 2026

Nuutti Tykkyläinen (born 19 July 1999) is a Finnish professional footballer who plays as a left-back for Ykkösliiga club Jippo.

== Club career ==
=== Jippo ===
Tykkyläinen is a product of Jippo. Due to injuries in the Jippo-squad, Tykkyläinen got his official debut for the club on 12 July 2015 against FC Myllypuro in the Kakkonen at the age of 16. Despite his young age, Tykkyläinen made a total of 13 appearances in the league in that season.

=== KuPS ===
In January 2016, Tykkyläinen was signed by Veikkausliiga club KuPS, where he was supposed to play for their KuPS' farmer club KuFu-98, while still training with KuPS. Tykkyläinen played for both the U-19 team of KuPS and KuFu-98 in his first three years at the club.

Tykkyläinen got his official debut for KuPS on 19 January 2018 in the Finnish Cup against Musan Salama. Tykkyläinen did also make his debut in the Veikkausliiga on 12 August 2018 against PS Kemi Kings.

=== Return to Jippo ===
On 2 September 2019, Tykkyläinen returned to Jippo on a loan deal for the rest of the season. He made a permanent return to JIPPO at the end of the season.

=== PK-35 ===
In January 2022, Tykkyläinen moved to fellow league club PK-35 on a deal for the 2022 season.

=== Third spell at Jippo ===
At the end of December 2022 Jippo confirmed, that Tykkyläinen would return to the club for the 2023 season.

== Career statistics ==
As of 13 May 2025

Appearances and goals by club, season and competition
Club	Season	League			National cup (Note: Includes Suomen Cup)		League cup (Note: Includes Ykköscup and Ykkösliigacup)		Europe		Total	
Club	Season	Division	Apps	Goals	Apps	Goals	Apps	Goals	Apps	Goals	Apps	Goals
Jippo	2015	Kakkonen	13	0	–		–		–		13	0
KuFu-98	2017	Kakkonen	21	1	–		–		–		21	1
KuFu-98	2018	Kakkonen	21	0	–		–		–		21	0
KuFu-98	2019	Kakkonen	14	3	–		–		–		14	3
KuFu-98	Total		56	4	0	0	–	–	–	–	56	4
KuPS	2018	Veikkausliiga	1	0	1	0	–		0	0	2	0
Jippo (loan)	2019	Kakkonen	7	0	–		–		–		7	0
Jippo	2020	Kakkonen	17	4	6	1	–		–		23	5
Jippo	2021	Ykkönen	27	5	3	1	–		–		30	6
Jippo	Total		44	9	9	2	–	–	–	–	53	11
PK-35	2022	Ykkönen	25	2	3	0	4	0	–		32	2
Jippo	2023	Kakkonen	24	3	1	0	–		–		25	3
Jippo	2024	Ykkösliiga	26	5	1	0	4	0	–		31	5
Jippo	2025	Ykkösliiga	4	1	1	0	6	0	–		11	1
Jippo	Total		54	9	3	0	10	0	–	–	67	9
Career total			200	24	16	2	14	0	0	0	230	26
