= 2024 Kuopion Palloseura season =

Kuopion Palloseura
2024 season
- Chairman: Ari Lahti
- Manager: Jani Honkavaara
- Stadium: Kuopio Football Stadium
- Veikkausliiga: 2nd
- UEFA Conference League: Second qualifying round
- Top goalscorer: League: Arttu Heinonen; Joslyn Luyeye-Lutumba; Petteri Pennanen (4); All: Jonathan Muzinga; Otto Ruoppi (7)
- Average home league attendance: 3,560
Home colours	Away colours

The 2024 season is the 102nd season in the history of Kuopion Palloseura and the club's 17th consecutive season in the Finnish topflight.

== Players ==
=== First-team squad ===
Note: Flags indicate national team as defined under FIFA eligibility rules; some limited exceptions apply. Players may hold more than one non-FIFA nationality.

No.	Pos.	Nation	Player
1	GK	AUT	Johannes Kreidl
2	DF	NED	Justin Bakker
4	DF	CPV	Kristopher Da Graca (on loan from Sirius)
6	DF	FIN	Saku Savolainen
7	MF	FIN	Jerry Voutilainen
8	MF	FIN	Petteri Pennanen
9	FW	FIN	Jonathan Muzinga
11	FW	FIN	Pyry Lampinen
12	GK	FIN	Aatu Hakala
13	MF	FIN	Jaakko Oksanen
14	FW	NGR	Mohammed Muritala (on loan from TikiTaka FC)
15	DF	CIV	Ibrahim Cissé
16	DF	FIN	Samuli Miettinen

No.	Pos.	Nation	Player
17	MF	FIN	Arttu Heinonen
18	DF	FIN	Seth Saarinen
19	DF	FIN	Samu Koistinen
21	FW	FIN	Joslyn Luyeye-Lutumba
23	FW	NGR	Paul Ogunkoya (on loan from Mahanaim FC)
25	DF	GHA	Clinton Antwi
26	MF	FIN	Axel Vidjeskog
28	MF	FIN	Matias Siltanen
30	MF	FIN	Lauri Sahimaa
31	DF	FIN	Tatu Hukkanen
33	DF	FIN	Taneli Hämäläinen
34	MF	FIN	Otto Ruoppi

== Friendlies ==
13 January 2024 Friendly	KuPS (Finland)	3–0	(Finland) MP Mikkeli

19 January 2024 Friendly	AC Oulu (Finland)	2–5	(Finland) KuPS

9 March 2024 Friendly	KuPS (Finland)	4–1	(Finland) FF Jaro

23 March 2024 Friendly	Hammarby IF (Sweden)	2–0	(Finland) KuPS

== Competitions ==
=== Overall record ===
Competition	First match	Last match	Starting round	Record							
Competition	First match	Last match	Starting round	Pld	W	D	L	GF	GA	GD	Win %
Veikkausliiga	6 April 2024	1 September 2024	Matchday 1	16	9	4	3	28	16	+12	56.25
Finnish Cup	16 June 2024		Fifth round	3	3	0	0	10	2	+8	100.00
UEFA Conference League	11 July 2024		First qualifying round	2	1	1	0	5	0	+5	50.00
Total				21	13	5	3	43	18	+25	61.90

Last updated: 21 July 2024
Source: Soccerway

=== Veikkausliiga ===
==== League table ====
Pos	Team	Pld	W	D	L	GF	GA	GD	Pts	Qualification
1	KuPS	22	13	5	4	39	22	+17	44	Qualification for the Championship Round
2	HJK	22	13	4	5	41	21	+20	43	Qualification for the Championship Round
3	Ilves	22	11	6	5	45	25	+20	39	Qualification for the Championship Round
4	SJK	22	10	6	6	40	33	+7	36	Qualification for the Championship Round
5	Haka	22	10	5	7	35	32	+3	35	Qualification for the Championship Round

Source: Flashscore
Rules for classification: 1) Points; 2) Goal difference; 3) Goals scored; 4) Head-to-head points; 5) Head-to-head goal difference; 6) Head-to-head away goals scored; 7) Play-off
(Note: Play-off is only played if need to decide champion, teams for relegation or UEFA competition and will be played on a neutral ground).

Pos	Team	Pld	W	D	L	GF	GA	GD	Pts	Qualification
1	KuPS (C)	27	17	5	5	46	24	+22	56	Qualification for the Champions League first qualifying round
2	Ilves	27	16	6	5	56	27	+29	54	Qualification for the Europa League first qualifying round (Note: The 2024 Finnish Cup winners qualified for the Conference League second qualifying round. Since the cup winners (KuPS) qualified based on league position, the Conference League second round spot was passed to the second-placed team. However due to the 2024-25 UEFA Conference League titleholders qualifying directly for the Champions League via their own domestic league, the spot reserved in the Europa League for the Conference League titleholders was vacated, and after rebalancing, the spot in the Conference League second qualifying round was transferred to the Europa League first qualifying round.)
3	HJK	27	13	6	8	44	27	+17	45	Qualification for the Conference League first qualifying round (Note: Since the Conference League second qualifying round spot was passed to the second-placed team, the Conference League first round spot was passed to the third-placed team, the Conference League play-off final spot was passed to the fourth-placed team, and the fourth Conference League play-off quarter-final spot was passed to the eighth-placed team.)
4	SJK (O)	27	11	7	9	46	44	+2	40	Qualification for the Conference League first qualifying round play-off final
5	VPS	27	11	6	10	43	45	−2	39	Qualification for the Conference League first qualifying round play-off quarter-finals

Source: Flashscore
Rules for classification: 1) Points; 2) Goal difference; 3) Goals scored; 4) Head-to-head points; 5) Head-to-head goal difference; 6) Head-to-head away goals scored; 7) Play-off
(Note: Play-off is only played if need to decide champion, teams for relegation or UEFA competition and will be played on a neutral ground).
(C) Champions; (O) Play-off winners
Notes:

Pos	Team	Pld	W	D	L	GF	GA	GD	Pts	Qualification or relegation
1	Inter Turku	27	12	5	10	46	34	+12	41	Qualification for the Conference League first qualifying round play-off quarter-finals
2	Gnistan	27	10	7	10	40	43	−3	37	Qualification for the Conference League first qualifying round play-off quarter-finals
3	Oulu	27	7	7	13	32	40	−8	28	
4	Mariehamn	27	7	5	15	27	44	−17	26	
5	Lahti (R)	27	4	12	11	31	47	−16	24	Qualification for the Veikkausliiga play-off
6	EIF (R)	27	4	7	16	24	57	−33	19	Relegation to the Ykkösliiga

Source: Flashscore
Rules for classification: 1) Points; 2) Goal difference; 3) Goals scored; 4) Head-to-head points; 5) Head-to-head goal difference; 6) Head-to-head away goals scored; 7) Play-off
(Note: Play-off is only played if need to decide champion, teams for relegation or UEFA competition and will be played on a neutral ground).
(R) Relegated

==== Results by round ====
Round	1	2	3	4	5	6	7	8	9	10	11	12	13	14	15
Ground	H	A	A	A	A	H	A	H	A	H	H	A	A	H	A
Result	W	D	D	W	D	W	D	W	W	W	L	L	L	W	W
Position															

A = Away; H = Home; W = Win; D = Draw; L = Loss

==== Matches ====
The match schedule was released on 18 January.

6 April 2024 1	KuPS	3–1	HJK	Kuopio
19:00 UTC+3	Olusanya 25' (o.g.); Savolainen 66'; Pennanen 77'		Ezeh 90+7'	Stadium: Kuopio Football Stadium; Referee: Oliver Reitala

13 April 2024 2	Mariehamn	2–2	KuPS	Mariehamn
17:00 UTC+3	Olawale 43'; Larsson 47' (pen.)		Ruoppi 45+1'; Vidjeskog 90+2' (pen.)	Stadium: Wiklöf Holding Arena; Referee: Dennis Antamo

19 April 2024 3	Inter Turku	1–1	KuPS	Turku
18:00 UTC+3	Botué 40'		Vidjeskog (penalty missed) 45+2'; Heinonen 79'	Stadium: Veritas Stadion; Referee: Oliver Reitala

27 April 2024 4	Lahti	0–1	KuPS	Lahti
				Stadium: Lahti Stadium

4 May 2024 5	SJK	1–1	KuPS	Seinäjoki
				Stadium: OmaSP Stadion

10 May 2024 6	KuPS	2–1	VPS	Kuopio
				Stadium: Kuopio Football Stadium

22 May 2024 15	VPS	1–3	KuPS	Vaasa
				Stadium: Hietalahti Stadium

19 May 2024 7	Gnistan	0–0	KuPS	Helsinki
				Stadium: Mustapekka Areena

26 May 2024 8	KuPS	4–1	EIF	Kuopio
				Stadium: Kuopio Football Stadium

31 May 2024 9	Ilves	1–2	KuPS	Tampere
				Stadium: Tammelan Stadion

8 June 2024 10	KuPS	4–1	Oulu	Kuopio
				Stadium: Kuopio Football Stadium

12 June 2024 11	KuPS	0–1	Haka	Kuopio
				Stadium: Kuopio Football Stadium

19 June 2024 12	HJK	3–1	KuPS	Helsinki
21:00 UTC+3	Möller 81'; Pallas 82'; Plange 90+3'		Pennanen 38'	Stadium: Bolt Arena; Referee: Antti Munukka

28 June 2024 13	AC Oulu	1–0	KuPS	Oulu
20:00 UTC+3	Jokelainen 79'			Stadium: Raatti Stadium; Referee: Mohammad Al-Emara

7 July 2024 14	KuPS	3–1	Gnistan	Kuopio
18:30 UTC+3	Siltanen 14'; Oksanen 20'; Luyeye-Lutumba 29'		Sarr 32'	Stadium: Kuopio Football Stadium; Referee: Matti Roth

21 July 2024 16	KuPS	v	Lahti	Kuopio
18:30 UTC+3				Stadium: Kuopio Football Stadium

28 July 2024 17	EIF	v	KuPS	Ekenäs
17:00 UTC+3				Stadium: Ekenäs Centrumplan

4 August 2024 18	KuPS	v	SJK	Kuopio
18:30 UTC+3				Stadium: Kuopio Football Stadium

11 August 2024 19	Haka	v	KuPS	Valkeakoski
17:00 UTC+3				Stadium: Tehtaan kenttä

18 August 2024 20	KuPS	v	Ilves	Kuopio
16:00 UTC+3				Stadium: Kuopio Football Stadium

25 August 2024 21	KuPS	v	Mariehamn	Kuopio
16:00 UTC+3				Stadium: Kuopio Football Stadium

1 September 2024 22	KuPS	v	Inter Turku	Kuopio
16:00 UTC+3				Stadium: Kuopio Football Stadium

=== Finnish Cup ===
16 June 2024 Fifth round	Mariehamn	1–3	KuPS	Mariehamn
19:00 UTC+3				Stadium: Wiklöf Holding Arena; Referee: Petri Viljanen

25 June 2024 Sixth round	PEPO	1–5	KuPS	Lappeenranta
18:30 UTC+3				Stadium: Kimpisen Urheilupuisto; Referee: Ayhan Dag

3 July 2024 Quarter-finals	EIF	0–2	KuPS	Raasepori
18:30 UTC+3				Stadium: Ekenäs Sparbank Arena TN; Referee: Oliver Reitala

21 August 2024 Semi-finals	SJK	v	KuPS

=== UEFA Conference League ===
==== First qualifying round ====
11 July 2024 First leg	UNA Strassen (Luxembourg)	0–0	(Finland) KuPS	Differdange, Luxembourg
19:00 UTC+2	Vova (yellow card) 20'; Zenadji (yellow card) 76'	Report	Cissé (yellow card) 50' (red card) 75'; Miettinen (yellow card) 69'	Stadium: Stade Municipal de la Ville de Differdange; Referee: Helgi Mikael Jónasson (Iceland)

18 July 2024 Second leg	KuPS (Finland)	5–0 (5–0 agg.)	(Luxembourg) UNA Strassen	Kuopio
18:00 UTC+3	Ruoppi 17', 20'; Vidjeskog 48'; Diawara 75'; Heinonen 90+1'	Report		Stadium: Kuopio Football Stadium; Referee: Ian McNabb (Northern Ireland)

==== Second qualifying round ====
25 July 2024 Second leg	KuPS (Finland)	v	(Norway) Tromsø	Kuopio
18:00 UTC+3				Stadium: Kuopio Football Stadium

1 August 2024 First leg	Tromsø (Norway)	v	(Finland) KuPS	Tromsø, Norway
19:00 UTC+2
