= Jonathan Muzinga =

Finnish footballer (born 2002)

Personal information
- Date of birth: 10 November 2002 (age 24)
- Place of birth: Lappeenranta, Finland
- Height: 1.84 m (6 ft 0 in)
- Position: Striker

Team information
- Current team: VPS
- Number: 11

Youth career
- –2018: Kontu
- 2018–2020: PK-35

Senior career*
| Years | Team | Apps | (Gls) |
| 2018 | Kontu | 1 | (0) |
| 2019–2021 | PK-35 | 42 | (24) |
| 2022 | SJK | 1 | (0) |
| 2022 | SJK II | 22 | (8) |
| 2023 | Honka | 14 | (2) |
| 2023 | Honka II | 5 | (1) |
| 2024–2025 | KuPS | 19 | (3) |
| 2024 | KuPS II | 1 | (0) |
| 2025–2026 | Lahti | 23 | (5) |
| 2026– | VPS | 23 | (1) |

International career^{‡}
| 2023 | Finland U21 | 1 | (0) |
- * Club domestic league appearances and goals as of 13 November 2026 ‡ National team caps and goals as of 23 January 2024

Jonathan Muzinga (born 10 November 2002) is a Finnish professional footballer who plays as a striker for Veikkausliiga club VPS.

== Early years ==
Born in Lappeenranta to parents from Democratic Republic of Congo, Muzinga moved to Helsinki with his family at an early age. He started playing football in the youth team of FC Kontu in Kontula, East Helsinki, before joining PK-35 when aged 15.

== Club career ==
Muzinga made his senior debut with FC Kontu first team in 2018, at the fourth-tier level Kolmonen.

=== PK-35 ===
Since 2019, he played with PK-35 first team in Kolmonen, Kakkonen and Ykkönen. At the end of the 2020 season interrupted by the pandemic, he was named the Player of the Season in Kakkonen Group A, and the Top Goalscorer after scoring 11 goals in 12 matches.

=== SJK ===
He joined SJK Seinäjoki organisation for the 2022 season. Muzinga made his Veikkausliiga debut with the first team, but he was mainly deployed in the club's reserve team SJK Akatemia in second-tier Ykkönen.

=== Honka ===
On 16 November 2022, he joined fellow Veikkausliiga side FC Honka. During the 2023, Muzinga made 14 appearances in the league scoring two goals. He was mainly deployed as a late substitute. After the season, Honka was suddenly declared for bankruptcy, and Muzinga was released.

=== KuPS ===
On 23 January 2024, Muzinga signed with Kuopion Palloseura (KuPS) in Veikkausliiga, on a one-year deal with an option to extend. On 22 May 2024, Muzinga scored his first Veikkausliiga goal for KuPS, in a 3–1 away win against Vaasan Palloseura (VPS). On 12 October, his contract option for the 2025 was exercised. During the 2024 season, Muzinga helped KuPS to win the Finnish championship title and the 2024 Finnish Cup, and thus completing the club's first ever double.

=== Lahti ===
On 28 February 2025, Muzinga joined newly relegated Ykkösliiga club Lahti.

== International career ==
Muzinga has made one appearance for Finland under-21 national team, in a friendly match against Iceland on 7 September 2023.

== Career statistics ==
As of 17 July 2025

Appearances and goals by club, season and competition
| Club | Season | Division | League | | Cup (Note: Includes Suomen Cup) | | League cup (Note: Includes Finnish League Cup and Ykkösliigacup) | | Europe | | Total | |
| Club | Season | Division | Apps | Goals | Apps | Goals | Apps | Goals | Apps | Goals | Apps | Goals |
|---|---|---|---|---|---|---|---|---|---|---|---|---|
| Kontu | 2018 | Kolmonen | 1 | 0 | — | | — | | — | | 1 | 0 |
| PK-35 | 2019 | Kolmonen | 7 | 4 | — | | — | | — | | 7 | 4 |
| PK-35 | 2020 | Kakkonen | 12 | 11 | — | | — | | — | | 12 | 11 |
| PK-35 | 2021 | Ykkönen | 23 | 9 | 3 | 1 | — | | — | | 26 | 10 |
| PK-35 | Total | | 42 | 24 | 3 | 1 | 0 | 0 | 0 | 0 | 45 | 25 |
| SJK | 2022 | Veikkausliiga | 1 | 0 | 0 | 0 | 0 | 0 | 0 | 0 | 1 | 0 |
| SJK Akatemia | 2022 | Ykkönen | 22 | 8 | 2 | 1 | — | | — | | 24 | 9 |
| Honka | 2023 | Veikkausliiga | 14 | 2 | 2 | 0 | 4 | 2 | 1 (Note: Includes UEFA Conference League) | 0 | 21 | 4 |
| Honka Akatemia | 2023 | Kakkonen | 5 | 1 | — | | — | | — | | 5 | 1 |
| KuPS | 2024 | Veikkausliiga | 19 | 3 | 5 | 3 | 7 | 1 | 3 | 0 | 34 | 7 |
| KuPS | 2025 | Veikkausliiga | 0 | 0 | 0 | 0 | 2 | 0 | 0 | 0 | 2 | 0 |
| KuPS | Total | | 19 | 3 | 5 | 3 | 9 | 1 | 3 | 0 | 36 | 7 |
| KuPS Akatemia | 2024 | Ykkönen | 1 | 0 | — | | — | | — | | 1 | 0 |
| Lahti | 2025 | Ykkösliiga | 14 | 5 | 1 | 0 | 1 | 1 | – | | 16 | 6 |
| Career total | | | 119 | 43 | 13 | 5 | 14 | 4 | 4 | 0 | 150 | 52 |

== Honours ==
KuPS

- Veikkausliiga: 2024
- Finnish Cup: 2024
- Finnish League Cup runner-up: 2024

Honka

- Finnish Cup runner-up: 2023

PK-35

- Kolmonen Group Helsinki/Uusimaa II: 2019
- Kakkonen Group A: 2020

Individual

- Kakkonen Group A: Player of the Year, 2020
- Kakkonen Group A: Top Goalscorer, 2020
