= Muritala =

Muritala is both a given name and a surname. Notable people with the name include:

- Muritala Ali (born 1984), Nigerian footballer
- Mohammed Muritala (born 2003), Nigerian footballer
