= Miika Töyräs =

Finnish footballer (born 1999)

Personal information
- Full name: Miika Samuli Töyräs
- Date of birth: 5 June 1999 (age 27)
- Place of birth: Jyväskylä, Finland
- Height: 1.86 m (6 ft 1 in)
- Position: Goalkeeper

Youth career
- KuPS

Senior career*
Years	Team	Apps	(Gls)
2016–2021	KuPS	10	(0)
2016	→ KuFu-98 (loan)	8	(0)
2017	→ KuFu-98 (loan)	14	(0)
2018	→ KuFu-98 (loan)	12	(0)
2019	→ KuFu-98 (loan)	1	(0)
2019	→ MP (loan)	4	(0)
2019	→ KuFu-98 (loan)	1	(0)
2020–2021	→ KPV (loan)	15	(0)

International career
2015–2016	Finland U17	3	(0)
2016–2017	Finland U18	3	(0)
2017–2018	Finland U19	5	(0)
- * Club domestic league appearances and goals as of 31 October 2021

Miika Samuli Töyräs (born 5 June 1999) is a Finnish professional footballer who plays as a goalkeeper.

== Career ==
=== Club career ===
On 11 November 2019 KPV confirmed, that Töyräs would join the club from the 2020 season, signing a one-year deal.
