= Otto Ruoppi =

Finnish footballer (born 2006)

Personal information
- Date of birth: 31 January 2006 (age 20)
- Place of birth: Kuopio, Finland
- Height: 1.80 m (5 ft 11 in)
- Position: Midfielder

Team information
- Current team: Mainz 05
- Number: 20

Youth career
- –2021: KuPS

Senior career*
Years	Team	Apps	(Gls)
2021	KuFu-98	11	(0)
2022	KuPS II	15	(1)
2023–2025	KuPS	57	(11)
2023	→ MP (loan)	28	(2)
2026–	Mainz 05	3	(0)
2026	→ KuPS (loan)	15	(4)

International career^{‡}
2021–2022	Finland U16	7	(1)
2022–2023	Finland U17	15	(2)
2023–2024	Finland U18	4	(1)
2023–2025	Finland U19	10	(0)
2025–	Finland U21	9	(3)
- * Club domestic league appearances and goals as of 12 September 2026 ‡ National team caps and goals as of 8 June 2026

Otto Ruoppi (born 31 January 2006) is a Finnish professional footballer who plays as a midfielder for Bundesliga side Mainz 05.

== Club career ==
=== KuPS ===
After playing in a youth sector of his home town club Kuopion Palloseura, Ruoppi started his senior career in 2021 at the age of 15 with KuFu-98, the club's reserve team at the time, playing in third-tier Kakkonen.

==== MP (loan) ====
He was loaned out to second-tier Ykkönen club Mikkelin Palloilijat for the 2023 season. During the season, he made 30 appearances for MP in all competitions combined, scoring two goals, as MP surprisingly finished in the third place of the 2023 Ykkönen.

==== Return to KuPS ====
On 6 April 2024, Ruoppi debuted in Veikkausliiga with KuPS first team, as a starter in the opening match of the 2024 season, in a 3–1 home win against HJK Helsinki. He scored his first league goal in the next game on 13 April, in a 2–2 away draw against IFK Mariehamn. On 31 May, Ruoppi extended his deal until the end of 2026. On 18 July, he scored a brace as KuPS defeated UNA Strassen 5–0 in the first round of the UECL qualifiers. In his debut season in Veikkausliiga, Ruoppi contributed in 25 appearances and scored three goals, helping KuPS to win the Finnish championship title and the Finnish Cup title, completing the club's first-ever double.

On 8 July 2025, Ruoppi scored the winning goal in a UCL qualifying win against Milsami Orhei.

=== Mainz 05 ===
On 2 February 2026, it was announced that Ruoppi had signed with Bundesliga club Mainz 05 for a transfer fee of €1.3 million. He would stay with KuPS on loan until July.

Ruoppi started the 2026–27 season with Mainz and made his Bundesliga debut on 29 August, as a substitute in a goalless draw against SC Paderborn.

== International career ==
Ruoppi is a regular Finnish youth international, and has represented his country at under-16, under-17, under-18 and under-19 national team levels. He was part of the Finland U17 squad, scoring once, in the 2023 UEFA Euro U17 Championship qualification, where Finland advanced to the Elite round.

== Career statistics ==
As of 12 September 2026

Appearances and goals by club, season and competition
Club	Season	League			National cup (Note: Includes Finnish Cup and DFB-Pokal)		League cup		Europe		Total	
Club	Season	Division	Apps	Goals	Apps	Goals	Apps	Goals	Apps	Goals	Apps	Goals
KuFu-98	2021	Kakkonen	11	0	—		—		—		11	0
KuPS Akatemia	2022	Kakkonen	15	1	—		—		—		15	1
KuPS	2023	Veikkausliiga	0	0	0	0	2	0	0	0	2	0
KuPS	2024	Veikkausliiga	25	3	5	1	6	3	4 (Note: Appearances in UEFA Conference League)	2	40	9
KuPS	2025	Veikkausliiga	32	8	4	0	6	0	16 (Note: Four appearances and one goal in UEFA Champions League, four appearances in UEFA Europa League and eight appearances in UEFA Conference League)	1	58	9
KuPS	Total		57	11	9	1	14	3	20	3	100	18
MP (loan)	2023	Ykkönen	28	2	2	0	—		—		30	2
Mainz 05	2025–26	Bundesliga	0	0	0	0	–		0	0	0	0
Mainz 05	2026–27	Bundesliga	3	0	1	0	–		–		4	0
Mainz 05	Total		3	0	1	0	–		0	0	4	0
KuPS (loan)	2026	Veikkausliiga	15	4	3	1	1	0	0	0	19	5
Career total			129	18	15	2	15	3	20	3	174	26

== Honours ==
KuPS

- Veikkausliiga: 2024, 2025
- Finnish Cup: 2024
- Finnish Cup runner-up: 2025
- Finnish League Cup runner-up: 2024
