= Saku Savolainen =

Finnish footballer (born 1996)

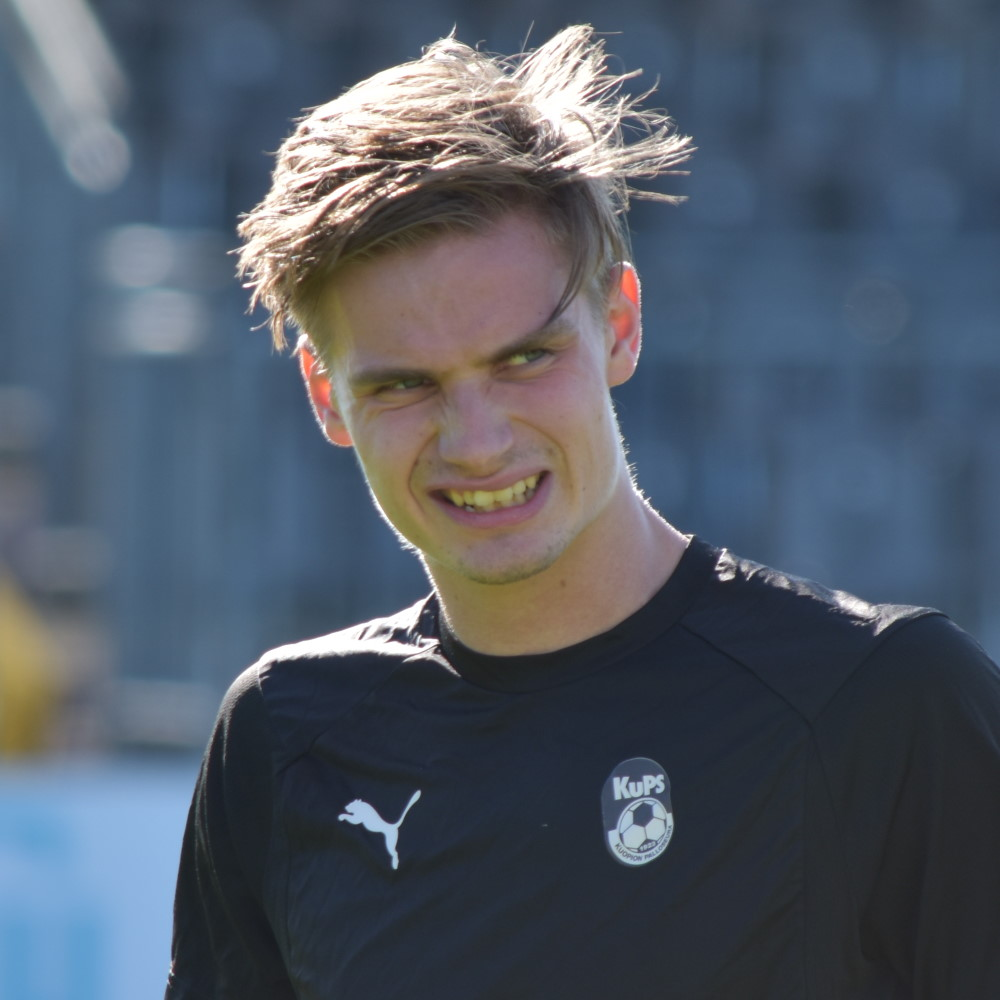
- Savolainen with KuPS in 2020.

Personal information
- Full name: Saku Jussi Savolainen
- Date of birth: 13 August 1996 (age 30)
- Place of birth: Iisalmi, Finland
- Height: 1.74 m (5 ft 9 in)
- Position: Right back

Team information
- Current team: KuPS
- Number: 6

Youth career
- PK-37
- –2015: KuPS

Senior career*
Years	Team	Apps	(Gls)
2013–	KuPS	295	(27)
2014	→ KuFu-98 (loan)	3	(0)

International career^{‡}
2013–2014	Finland U18	5	(1)
2014–2015	Finland U19	9	(1)
2017–2018	Finland U21	6	(2)
- * Club domestic league appearances and goals as of 12 November 2026 ‡ National team caps and goals as of 10 October 2017

Saku Jussi Savolainen (born 13 August 1996) is a Finnish professional football player who plays as a right back or right winger for Veikkausliiga club Kuopion Palloseura (KuPS).

== Club career ==
Savolainen made his Veikkausliiga debut for Kuopion Palloseura (KuPS) on 23 May 2013 in a game against JJK.

In 2017, he was a candidate to be named in the Finland national team squad, but was forced to withdraw due to injury.

In the early 2021, Savolainen suffered an injury which forced him to miss the entire season. He returned to the line-up in May 2022, in a Finnish Cup match against Ekenäs IF, scoring a goal in a 5–1 win.

On 1 November 2022, Savolainen extended his contract with KuPS again, on a deal until the end of the 2024. On 4 November 2024, after winning the 2024 Finnish Cup and Finnish championship title with KuPS, he signed a new two-year deal with a one-year option.

== Career statistics ==
As of 14 May 2025

Appearances and goals by club, season and competition
Club	Season	Division	League		National cup		League cup		Europe		Total	
Club	Season	Division	Apps	Goals	Apps	Goals	Apps	Goals	Apps	Goals	Apps	Goals
KuPS	2013	Veikkausliiga	18	2	1	0	0	0	–		19	2
KuPS	2014	Veikkausliiga	17	0	2	1	3	0	–		22	1
KuPS	2015	Veikkausliiga	27	4	5	1	3	0	–		35	5
KuPS	2016	Veikkausliiga	31	4	4	2	5	0	–		40	6
KuPS	2017	Veikkausliiga	32	1	5	0	–		–		37	1
KuPS	2018	Veikkausliiga	24	2	5	1	–		2 (Note: Includes UEFA Europa League)	0	31	3
KuPS	2019	Veikkausliiga	18	0	4	0	–		3	0	25	0
KuPS	2020	Veikkausliiga	22	1	5	0	–		4 (Note: Includes UEFA Champions League and UEFA Europa League)	0	31	1
KuPS	2021	Veikkausliiga	0	0	5	2	–		0	0	5	2
KuPS	2022	Veikkausliiga	12	1	4	1	0	0	2 (Note: Includes UEFA Europa Conference League)	0	18	2
KuPS	2023	Veikkausliiga	18	4	3	0	0	0	2	2	23	5
KuPS	2024	Veikkausliiga	19	4	4	0	6	0	4	0	30	4
KuPS	2025	Veikkausliiga	7	0	0	0	6	4	0	0	13	4
KuPS	Total		245	23	47	8	23	4	17	2	329	37
KuFu-98 (loan)	2014	Kakkonen	3	0	–		–		–		3	0
Career total			248	23	47	8	23	4	17	2	335	37

== Honours ==
KuPS

- Veikkausliiga: 2019, 2024, 2025
- Veikkausliiga runner-up: 2017, 2022, 2023
- Finnish Cup: 2021, 2022, 2024
- Finnish Cup runner-up: 2013, 2025
- Finnish League Cup runner-up: 2024
