= Victor de Paula =

Brazilian footballer (born 1995)

Personal information
- Full name: Victor Matheus de Paula
- Date of birth: 18 January 1995 (age 31)
- Place of birth: Brazil
- Height: 1.85 m (6 ft 1 in)
- Position: Centre back

Team information
- Current team: Jippo
- Number: 4

Senior career*
Years	Team	Apps	(Gls)
2018	MiPK	11	(0)
2019	Klubi 04	10	(0)
2020	Atlantis	14	(0)
2021	MiPK	11	(0)
2021	→ Finnkurd (loan)	1	(0)
2022–2024	Jippo	64	(8)
2025	Penya Encarnada	10	(0)
2025	FC Jazz	6	(0)
2026–	Jippo	17	(1)
- * Club domestic league appearances and goals as of 1 November 2026

Victor Matheus de Paula (born 18 January 1995) is a Brazilian professional footballer who plays as a centre back for Ykkösliiga club Jippo.

== Club career ==
De Paula first moved to Finland in early 2018 and signed with Mikkelin Pallo-Kissat in third-tier Kakkonen. His move was arranged by former Brazilian footballer Rafael, who had spent most of his career in Finland. However, de Paula and fellow Brazilian players left the club in July due to obscurity in salary payments. For the 2019 season, he signed with Klubi 04, the reserve of team of HJK Helsinki. In 2020, he played for Atlantis, and in 2021 he returned to Mikkelin Pallo-Kissat.

For the 2022 season, de Paula joined Jippo in Kakkonen. After his first season with the club, de Paula was named the Defender of the Year in Kakkonen Group A. He repeated the award in 2023. At the end of the 2023 season, Jippo won the Group A and eventually were promoted to newly established second-tier Ykkösliiga via promotion play-offs. He debuted in Finnish second level on 13 April 2024, in a 3–0 away win against SalPa. He was an integral part of the team's defense as Jippo surprisingly finished 3rd in the league. After the season, it was announced he would leave the club. During his three seasons with Jippo, de Paula totalled 69 appearances and scored eight goals in all competitions combined.

In January 2025, he signed with Penya Encarnada in Andorran first-tier Primera Divisió.

== Career statistics ==
As of 26 July 2026

Appearances and goals by club, season and competition
Club	Season	League			National cup (Note: Includes Suomen Cup)		Other		Total	
Club	Season	Division	Apps	Goals	Apps	Goals	Apps	Goals	Apps	Goals
MiPK	2018	Kakkonen	11	0	–		–		11	0
Klubi 04	2019	Kakkonen	10	0	–		–		10	0
Atlantis	2020	Kakkonen	14	0	–		–		14	0
Atlantis Akatemia	2020	Kolmonen	3	0	–		–		3	0
MiPK	2021	Kakkonen	11	0	–		–		11	0
Finnkurd (loan)	2021	Kolmonen	1	0	–		–		1	0
Jippo	2022	Kakkonen	20	2	1	0	–		21	2
Jippo	2023	Kakkonen	22	5	1	0	–		23	5
Jippo	2024	Ykkösliiga	22	1	1	0	2	0	25	1
Jippo	Total		64	8	3	0	2	0	69	8
Penya Encarnada	2024–25	Primera Divisió	9	0	0	0	–		9	0
FC Jazz	2025	Ykkönen	6	0	0	0	–		6	0
Jippo	2026	Ykkösliiga	8	1	0	0	–		8	1
Career total			137	9	3	0	2	0	142	9

== Honours ==
Jippo

- Kakkonen Group A: 2023

Individual

- Kakkonen Group A, Defender of the Year: 2022, 2023
