= Joslyn Luyeye-Lutumba =

Finnish footballer (born 2002)

Personal information
- Full name: Joslyn Luyeye-Lutumba
- Date of birth: 7 December 2002 (age 23)
- Place of birth: Helsinki, Finland
- Height: 1.77 m (5 ft 10 in)
- Position: Right winger

Team information
- Current team: KuPS
- Number: 21

Youth career
- –2016: HJK
- 2017–2019: KäPa
- 2020: Honka

Senior career*
Years	Team	Apps	(Gls)
2020–2021	Honka II	30	(1)
2022–2023	MP	52	(11)
2024–	KuPS	76	(16)
- * Club domestic league appearances and goals as of 12 November 2026

Joslyn Luyeye-Lutumba (born 7 December 2002) is a Finnish professional footballer who plays as a right winger for Veikkausliiga side KuPS.

== Early career ==
He started to play football in the youth sector of HJK. Later he joined the renowned Käpylän Pallo youth academy in Helsinki, when he was 14 years old. In 2020, Luyeye-Lutumba moved to FC Honka organisation, and made his senior debut with the club's reserve team Honka II in the third-tier Kakkonen in 2020.

== Club career ==
=== MP ===
Ahead of the 2022 season, Luyeye-Lutumba moved to Mikkeli after signing with Mikkelin Palloilijat, playing in the second-tier Ykkönen. On 17 February 2023, he extended his contract for the 2023 season. Coached by Juha Pasoja, the team unexpectedly finished 3rd in Ykkönen in 2023.

=== KuPS ===
On 17 November 2023, Luyeye-Lutumba signed a two-year deal with Kuopion Palloseura in Veikkausliiga, with an option for an additional year. He debuted with his new club on 27 January 2024, in a Finnish League Cup loss against Ilves. On 6 April, Luyeye-Lutumba debuted in the league in a 3–1 home win against HJK Helsinki. On 22 May, he scored his first goals in the league, a brace in a 3–1 away win against Vaasan Palloseura. In his first season with KuPS in Finnish first-tier, Luyeye-Lutumba contributed to win the titles of the 2024 Finnish Cup and the Finnish Championship, completing the club's first ever double. He missed the last part of the season due to injury.

On 27 June 2025, Luyeye-Lutumba scored his first hat-trick in Veikkausliiga, a 3–0 home win against HJK Helsinki, thus breaking KuPS's five-game winless and goalless run.

== Personal life ==
Born in Helsinki, Finland, Luyeye-Lutumba is of Congolese descent. His older brothers Didis Lutumba-Pitah and Fortuna Namputu are also professional footballers.

== Career statistics ==
As of 12 August 2026

Appearances and goals by club, season and competition
Club	Season	League			National cup (Note: Includes Finnish Cup)		League cup (Note: Includes Ykköscup and Finnish League Cup)		Europe		Total	
Club	Season	Division	Apps	Goals	Apps	Goals	Apps	Goals	Apps	Goals	Apps	Goals
Honka Akatemia	2020	Kakkonen	10	0	—		—		—		10	0
Honka Akatemia	2021	Kakkonen	20	1	—		—		—		20	1
Honka Akatemia	Total		30	1	0	0	0	0	0	0	30	1
MP	2022	Ykkönen	24	3	3	0	2	1	—		29	4
MP	2023	Ykkönen	28	8	0	0	—		—		28	8
MP	Total		52	11	3	0	2	1	0	0	57	12
KuPS	2024	Veikkausliiga	18	4	3	1	6	1	4 (Note: Includes UEFA Conference League)	0	31	6
KuPS	2025	Veikkausliiga	28	6	4	2	6	2	12 (Note: 4 appearances in UEFA Champions League, 4 appearances in UEFA Europa League and 4 appearances in UEFA Conference League)	0	50	10
KuPS	2026	Veikkausliiga	19	4	3	0	2	0	4 (Note: 3 appearances in UEFA Champions League and one appearance in UEFA Europa League)	0	28	4
KuPS	Total		65	14	10	3	14	3	20	0	109	19
Career total			147	26	13	3	15	4	20	0	195	33

== Honours ==
KuPS

- Veikkausliiga: 2024, 2025
- Finnish Cup: 2024
- Finnish Cup runner-up: 2025
- Finnish League Cup runner-up: 2024
