= Stiwar García =

Colombian footballer (born 1990)

Personal information
- Full name: Jhon Stiwar García Mena
- Date of birth: 6 September 1990 (age 36)
- Place of birth: Quibdó, Colombia
- Position: Midfielder

Team information
- Current team: Patriotas Boyacá
- Number: 19

Youth career
- Atlético Nacional

Senior career*
Years	Team	Apps	(Gls)
2010–2014	Atlético Nacional	4	(0)
2011	→ Real Santander (loan)	33	(10)
2013	→ Alianza Petrolera (loan)	15	(0)
2013	→ América de Cali (loan)	19	(5)
2014	→ Fortaleza CEIF (loan)	17	(4)
2015	Alianza Petrolera	3	(0)
2015–2016	Atlético Bucaramanga	26	(5)
2016–2017	Deportivo Pereira	51	(11)
2018	KuPS	4	(0)
2018	→ KuFu-98 (loan)	5	(1)
2018–2019	Nacional Potosí	19	(6)
2019–2020	Jaguares de Córdoba	34	(3)
2021–	Patriotas Boyacá	1	(0)
- * Club domestic league appearances and goals as of 20:24, 24 January 2021 (UTC)

Jhon Stiwar García Mena (born 6 September 1990) is a Colombian professional footballer who plays for Finnish club KuPS, as a midfielder.
