= Tony Miettinen =

Finnish footballer (born 2002)

Personal information
- Date of birth: 23 September 2002 (age 24)
- Place of birth: Mombasa, Kenya
- Height: 1.84 m (6 ft 0 in)
- Position: Centre-back

Team information
- Current team: Mjällby AIF
- Number: 33

Youth career
- SiPS
- –2019: KuPS
- 2019–2021: Nordsjælland

Senior career*
Years	Team	Apps	(Gls)
2018–2019	KuFu-98	20	(0)
2019–2021	Nordsjælland	0	(0)
2021	KuFu-98	8	(1)
2022	KuPS II	9	(3)
2022–2023	KuPS	7	(0)
2023	→ AC Oulu (loan)	6	(1)
2024	Odd	18	(1)
2025–	Mjällby	19	(0)

International career^{‡}
2018–2019	Finland U17	12	(0)
2019	Finland U18	2	(0)
2019	Finland U19	3	(0)
2021	Finland U20	2	(0)
2023–2025	Finland U21	17	(1)
2026–	Finland	8	(1)
Medal record
Representing Finland
Men's football
FIFA Series
Winner	2026 New Zealand
- * Club domestic league appearances and goals as of 10 September 2026 ‡ National team caps and goals as of 13 November 2026

Tony Miettinen (born 23 September 2002) is a professional footballer who plays as a centre-back for Allsvenskan club Mjällby. Born in Kenya, he represents the Finland national team.

== Early career ==
Miettinen started to play football in Finland with Siilinjärven Palloseura (SiPS) in Siilinjärvi. Later he joined the youth sector of the Veikkausliiga side Kuopion Palloseura (KuPS) in a nearby city of Kuopio.

== Club career ==
=== KuPS ===
Miettinen made his senior debut in 2018 with KuFu-98, the reserve team of KuPS, and played with the team in 2018 and 2019 in the third-tier league Kakkonen.

=== Nordsjælland ===
In August 2019, Danish club Nordsjælland announced the signing of Miettinen to their youth academy, for an undisclosed fee, later reported to be €100,000. He mostly played for the club's under-19 academy team, but made one appearance with the first team, as a substitute in a Danish Cup match against Hvidovre IF, on 12 November 2020.

=== Return to KuPS ===
Two years later, he returned to KuPS after his contract expired with Nordsjælland in August 2021. Miettinen represented KuPS in the 2022–23 UEFA Europa Conference League qualifiers, scoring a goal in away win against Milsami Orhei on 28 July 2022.

==== AC Oulu (loan) ====
In the beginning of the 2023 season, Miettinen was sent on loan to a fellow Veikkausliiga club AC Oulu on a short contract. During his stint, he was mostly out of the line-up due to injury, but on 27 June 2023 he scored his first goal in the league with AC Oulu, in a 4–1 away win against SJK Seinäjoki. Miettinen returned to KuPS after his three-month loan deal ended on 16 July 2023.

=== Odd ===
On 6 February 2024, Miettinen joined Norwegian Eliteserien side Odds Ballklubb (Odd) on a deal until 31 July 2027, for a transfer fee of €180,000. He officially debuted with Odd on 31 March 2024, in a 2024 Eliteserien season opening game against FK Haugesund, scoring a goal for his side in a 2–1 loss.

=== Mjällby ===
On 28 February 2025, Swedish Allsvenskan side Mjällby announced the signing of Miettinen on a deal until June 2029 for a rumoured fee of €470,000.

== International career ==
Miettinen is a regular Finnish youth international, having represented the country at various youth national team levels. Since March 2023, Miettinen has played for the Finland under-21 national team.

== Personal life ==
Miettinen was born in Mombasa, Kenya, and raised in Siilinjärvi, Finland, since the age of ten. His Kenyan mother, Phoebe, had met a Finnish man, Jouni Miettinen, who was travelling to the FIFA World Cup held in South Africa in 2010, and in 2012 Tony and his mother moved to Jouni's hometown of Siilinjärvi.

== Career statistics ==
As of 10 September 2026

Appearances and goals by club, season and competition
Club	Season	League			National cup (Note: Includes Danish Cup, Suomen Cup, Norwegian Cup, Svenska Cupen)		League cup (Note: Includes Finnish League Cup)		Europe		Total	
Club	Season	Division	Apps	Goals	Apps	Goals	Apps	Goals	Apps	Goals	Apps	Goals
KuFu-98	2018	Kakkonen	11	0	—		—		—		11	0
KuFu-98	2019	Kakkonen	9	0	—		—		—		9	0
KuFu-98	Total		20	0	0	0	0	0	0	0	20	0
Nordsjælland	2020–21	Danish Superliga	0	0	1	0	—		—		1	0
KuFu-98	2021	Kakkonen	8	1	—		—		—		8	1
KuPS Akatemia	2022	Kakkonen	9	3	—		—		—		9	3
KuPS	2022	Veikkausliiga	4	0	0	0	1	0	1 (Note: Appearance(s) in the UEFA Europa Conference League)	1	6	1
KuPS	2023	Veikkausliiga	3	0	0	0	3	0	1	0	7	0
KuPS	Total		7	0	0	0	4	0	2	1	13	1
AC Oulu (loan)	2023	Veikkausliiga	6	1	1	0	—		—		7	1
Odd	2024	Eliteserien	18	1	2	0	—		—		20	1
Odd 2	2024	3. divisjon	1	0	—		—		—		1	0
Mjällby	2025	Allsvenskan	3	0	1	0	—		—		4	0
Mjällby	2026	Allsvenskan	16	0	5	0	—		4 (Note: Two appearances in UEFA Champions League and two appearances in UEFA Europa League)	0	25	0
Mjällby	Total		19	0	6	0	0	0	4	0	29	0
Career total			89	6	10	0	4	0	6	1	108	7

=== International ===
As of match played 12 November 2026

National team	Year	Competitive		Friendly		Total	
National team	Year	Apps	Goals	Apps	Goals	Apps	Goals
Finland	2026	4 (Note: Appearances in the 2026–27 UEFA Nations League C.)	0	4 (Note: Includes two appearances in the 2026 FIFA Series.)	1	8	1
Total		7	0	4	1	8	1

Scores and results list Finland's goal tally first, score column indicates score after each Miettinen goal.

List of international goals scored by Tony Miettinen
No.	Date	Venue	Cap	Opponent	Score	Result	Competition
1	5 June 2026	Puskás Aréna, Budapest, Hungary	4	Hungary	1–2	1–2	Friendly

== Honours ==
Mjällby

- Allsvenskan: 2025
- Svenska Cupen: 2025–26

KuPS

- Veikkausliiga runner-up: 2022, 2023

Finland

- FIFA Series: 2026
