= Lomski =

Lomski is a surname. Notable people with the surname include:

- Leo Lomski (c. 1902–1975), American boxer
- Patrik Lomski (born 1989), Finnish football winger
