= Lauri Sahimaa =

Finnish footballer (born 2005)

Personal information
- Date of birth: 9 March 2005 (age 21)
- Place of birth: Finland
- Position: Midfielder

Team information
- Current team: Jippo
- Number: 15

Youth career
- –2021: KuPS

Senior career*
Years	Team	Apps	(Gls)
2021	KuFu-98	5	(0)
2022–2026	KuPS II	40	(5)
2022–2025	KuPS	1	(0)
2023	→ MP (loan)	16	(1)
2025	→ Jippo (loan)	5	(0)
2026–	Jippo	20	(2)

International career^{‡}
2022–2023	Finland U18	3	(0)
- * Club domestic league appearances and goals as of 1 November 2026 ‡ National team caps and goals as of 21 July 2024

Lauri Sahimaa (born 9 March 2005) is a Finnish professional football player who plays as a midfielder for Ykkösliiga side Jippo.

== Club career ==
Sahimaa started playing football in Kuopion Palloseura (KuPS) organisation. He was named the Best Player of the Season of the KuPS reserve team in 2022.

For the 2023 season, he was loaned out to Mikkelin Palloilijat (MP) in second-tier Ykkönen.

Sahimaa debuted in Veikkausliiga with KuPS first team on 21 July 2024 as a starter, in a 1–0 home win against FC Lahti. On 13 October, his option for 2025 was exercised.

== Honours ==
KuPS

- Veikkausliiga: 2024
