= Lassi Forss =

Finnish footballer (born 2002)

Personal information
- Date of birth: 15 January 2002 (age 24)
- Place of birth: Lahti, Finland
- Position: Right-back

Team information
- Current team: Jippo
- Number: 20

Youth career
- Kuusysi

Senior career*
Years	Team	Apps	(Gls)
2018	Kuusysi	3	(0)
2019–2021	Reipas Lahti	21	(1)
2019–2021	Lahti	17	(0)
2020	→ MyPa (loan)	8	(0)
2022–2023	Reipas Lahti	44	(3)
2024–	Jippo	76	(3)

International career
- Finland U19
- * Club domestic league appearances and goals as of 1 November 2026

Lassi Forss (born 15 January 2002) is a Finnish professional footballer who plays as a right-back for Jippo in Ykkösliiga.
