= Tuomo Könönen =

Finnish footballer (born 1977)

Personal information
- Date of birth: 29 December 1977 (age 48)
- Place of birth: Trollhättan, Sweden
- Height: 1.75 m (5 ft 9 in)
- Positions: Left back; defensive midfielder

Senior career*
Years	Team	Apps	(Gls)
1995–1998	Visan Pallo	63	(6)
1998–2001	RoPS	94	(4)
2002–2005	MYPA	87	(4)
2006–2008	Odd	58	(1)
2009	MYPA	25	(1)
2010	PS Kemi	24	(3)
2011–2013	RoPS	75	(4)
2014–2016	PS Kemi	48	(4)

International career
2004–2008	Finland	7	(0)

Managerial career
- 2021: PS Kemi
- * Club domestic league appearances and goals as of 6 August 2015

Tuomo Könönen (born 29 December 1977) is a Finnish football coach and a former professional football player.

== Career statistics ==
=== Club ===
Appearances and goals by club, season and competition
Club	Season	League			Cup (Note: Includes Suomen Cup, Norwegian Football Cup and Finnish League Cup)		Europe		Total	
Club	Season	Division	Apps	Goals	Apps	Goals	Apps	Goals	Apps	Goals
Visan Pallo	1994	Kakkonen	9	0	–		–		9	0
Visan Pallo	1995	Kakkonen	20	1	–		–		20	1
Visan Pallo	1996	Kolmonen			–		–			
Visan Pallo	1997	Kakkonen	19	3	–		–		19	3
Visan Pallo	1998	Kakkonen	15	2	–		–		15	2
Visan Pallo	Total		63	6	0	0	0	0	63	6
RoPS	1998	Veikkausliiga	7	1	–		–		7	1
RoPS	1999	Veikkausliiga	26	0	–		–		26	0
RoPS	2000	Veikkausliiga	33	3	–		–		33	3
RoPS	2001	Veikkausliiga	28	0	–		–		28	0
RoPS	Total		94	6	0	0	0	0	94	6
MYPA	2002	Veikkausliiga	27	2	–		2 (Note: Appearances in UEFA Cup)	0	29	2
MYPA	2003	Veikkausliiga	12	0	–		1	0	13	0
MYPA	2004	Veikkausliiga	22	2	1	0	2 (Note: Appearances in UEFA Intertoto Cup)	0	25	2
MYPA	2005	Veikkausliiga	26	0	–		5	0	31	0
MYPA	Total		87	4	1	0	10	0	98	4
Rakuunat (loan)	2003	Ykkönen	4	0	–		–		4	0
Odd	2006	Tippeligaen	21	1	0	0	–		21	1
Odd	2007	Tippeligaen	25	0	1	0	–		26	0
Odd	2008	1. divisjon	12	0	–		–		12	0
Odd	Total		58	1	1	0	0	0	59	1
MYPA	2009	Veikkausliiga	25	1	–		–		25	1
PS Kemi Kings	2010	Ykkönen	23	1	–		–		23	1
RoPS	2011	Veikkausliiga	29	1	–		–		29	1
RoPS	2012	Ykkönen	23	3	–		–		23	3
RoPS	2013	Veikkausliiga	23	0	3	0	–		26	0
RoPS	Total		75	4	3	0	0	0	78	4
PS Kemi Kings	2014	Kakkonen	20	1	1	0	–		21	1
PS Kemi Kings	2015	Ykkönen	11	2	–		–		11	2
PS Kemi Kings	2016	Veikkausliiga	17	1	3	0	–		20	1
PS Kemi Kings	Total		48	4	4	0	0	0	52	4
TP-47	2017	Kakkonen	10	0	–		–		10	0
Career total			487	27	9	0	10	0	506	27

=== International ===
As of match played 2 February 2008

Finland
Year	Apps	Goals
2004	1	0
2005	3	0
2006	2	0
2007	0	0
2008	1	0
Total	7	0

== Honours ==
MYPA

- Veikkausliiga: 2005
- Finnish Cup: 2004

RoPS

- Finnish Cup: 2013
