= Eemeli Honkola =

Finnish footballer (born 2005)

Personal information
- Date of birth: 28 January 2005 (age 21)
- Place of birth: Finland
- Position: Forward

Team information
- Current team: Jippo
- Number: 28

Youth career
- –2021: SJK

Senior career*
Years	Team	Apps	(Gls)
2021–2025	SJK	1	(0)
2021–2025	→ SJK Akatemia	40	(14)
2021–2024	→ SJK Akatemia II	28	(37)
2025	Kerry	4	(0)
2025–	Jippo	41	(10)

International career^{‡}
- Finland U17
- * Club domestic league appearances and goals as of 1 November 2026 ‡ National team caps and goals as of 10 March 2024

Eemeli Honkola (born 28 January 2005) is a Finnish professional footballer who plays as a centre forward for Jippo.

== Career ==
Honkola played in the SJK Seinäjoki youth sector. He debuted in Veikkausliiga with SJK first team in the 2022 season.

In March 2025, after having played two pre-season Ykkösliigacup matches as a test player for Salon Palloilijat and Jippo, Honkola moved abroad and signed with Kerry in Irish second-tier LOI First Division. He made 4 appearances before departing the club on 10 June 2025.

== Personal life ==
Growing up, Honkola has also played pesäpallo, the Finnish baseball, in a youth team of Seinäjoen Maila-Jussit.

== Career statistics ==
As of match played on 16 April 2025

Appearances and goals by club, season and competition
Club	Season	League			National cup (Note: Includes Suomen Cup)		League cup (Note: Includes Ykköscup, Ykkösliigacup, Finnish League Cup)		Total	
Club	Season	Division	Apps	Goals	Apps	Goals	Apps	Goals	Apps	Goals
SJK Seinäjoki	2022	Veikkausliiga	1	0	1	0	0	0	2	0
SJK Seinäjoki	2023	Veikkausliiga	0	0	0	0	0	0	0	0
SJK Seinäjoki	2024	Veikkausliiga	0	0	0	0	1	0	1	0
SJK Seinäjoki	Total		1	0	1	0	1	0	3	0
SJK Akatemia	2021	Kakkonen	1	1	–		–		1	1
SJK Akatemia	2022	Ykkönen	0	0	0	0	0	0	0	0
SJK Akatemia	2023	Ykkönen	18	7	0	0	3	0	21	7
SJK Akatemia	2024	Ykkösliiga	21	6	3	1	6	1	30	8
SJK Akatemia	Total		40	14	3	1	9	1	52	16
SJK Akatemia II	2022	Kolmonen	4	4	–		–		4	4
SJK Akatemia II	2023	Kolmonen	17	26	–		–		17	26
SJK Akatemia II	2024	Kakkonen	7	7	–		–		7	7
SJK Akatemia II	Total		28	37	0	0	0	0	28	37
SalPa	2025	Ykkösliiga	0	0	0	0	1	1	1	1
Jippo	2025	Ykkösliiga	0	0	0	0	1	0	1	0
Kerry	2025	LOI First Division	4	0	–		–		4	0
Jippo	2025	Ykkösliiga	1	0	–		–		1	0
Career total			74	51	4	1	12	2	90	54
