= Seth Saarinen =

Finnish footballer (born 2001)

Personal information
- Date of birth: 5 May 2001 (age 25)
- Place of birth: Helsinki, Finland
- Height: 1.80 m (5 ft 11 in)
- Position: Defender

Team information
- Current team: Inter Turku
- Number: 18

Youth career
- –2017: HJK
- 2017: Zürich

Senior career*
Years	Team	Apps	(Gls)
2018–2019	Klubi 04	22	(1)
2020–2022	Haka	59	(3)
2023–2024	KuPS	43	(4)
2025	De Graafschap	4	(0)
2025–	Inter Turku	29	(0)

International career^{‡}
2016–2017	Finland U16	5	(0)
2019	Finland U18	2	(0)
- * Club domestic league appearances and goals as of 12 November 2026 ‡ National team caps and goals as of 12:34, 22 July 2020 (UTC)

Seth Saarinen (born 5 May 2001) is a Finnish footballer who plays as a right-back for Veikkausliiga club FC Inter Turku.

== Club career ==
Saarinen spent his youth years in HJK youth sector, before he transferred to FC Zürich in 2017, for a €100,000 transfer fee.

Saarinen signed with Veikkausliiga club Haka on 11 December 2019 on a one-year deal. His contract with Haka was extended for two more years on 6 September 2020.

Ahead of the 2023 Veikkausliiga season, Saarinen signed with KuPS on a two-year deal.

On 7 September 2024, it was announced that Saarinen would join Dutch club De Graafschap in January 2025. He had signed a two-and-a-half-year deal with an option for one more, but in July 2025, he returned to Veikkausliiga and joined FC Inter after only five competitive matches with De Graafschap.

== Personal life ==
Saarinen was born in Finland to a Swiss mother and a Finnish father, and he holds dual citizenship of Finland and Switzerland. He fulfilled the mandatory Finnish military service in Santahamina, Helsinki, between Autumn 2023 and Spring 2024.

== Career statistics ==
As of 11 May 2025

Club	Season	League			Cup (Note: Includes Suomen Cup and KNVB Cup)		Europe		Other		Total	
Club	Season	Division	Apps	Goals	Apps	Goals	Apps	Goals	Apps	Goals	Apps	Goals
Klubi 04	2018	Ykkönen	2	0	0	0	–		0	0	2	0
Klubi 04	2019	Kakkonen	20	1	0	0	–		2 (Note: Appearances in the Kakkonen Cup)	0	22	1
Klubi 04	Total		22	1	0	0	0	0	2	0	24	1
Haka	2020	Veikkausliiga	12	0	6	1	–		–		18	1
Haka	2021	Veikkausliiga	19	2	2	0	–		–		21	2
Haka	2022	Veikkausliiga	28	1	4	0	–		5 (Note: Appearances in the Finnish League Cup)	0	37	1
Haka	Total		59	3	12	1	0	0	0	0	76	4
KuPS	2023	Veikkausliiga	24	3	3	0	2 (Note: Appearances in the UEFA Europa Conference League)	0	6	0	35	3
KuPS	2024	Veikkausliiga	19	1	5	0	1	0	7	0	32	1
KuPS	Total		43	4	8	0	3	0	13	0	66	4
KuPS Akatemia	2024	Ykkönen	1	1	–		–		–		1	1
De Graafschap	2024–25	Eerste Divisie	4	0	1	0	–		–		5	0
Inter Turku	2025	Veikkausliiga	0	0	–		–		–		0	0
Career total			129	9	21	1	3	0	20	0	173	10

== Honours ==
KuPS

- Veikkausliiga: 2024
- Veikkausliiga runner-up: 2023
- Finnish Cup: 2024
- Finnish League Cup runner-up: 2024
