= Justin Bakker =

Dutch footballer (born 1998)

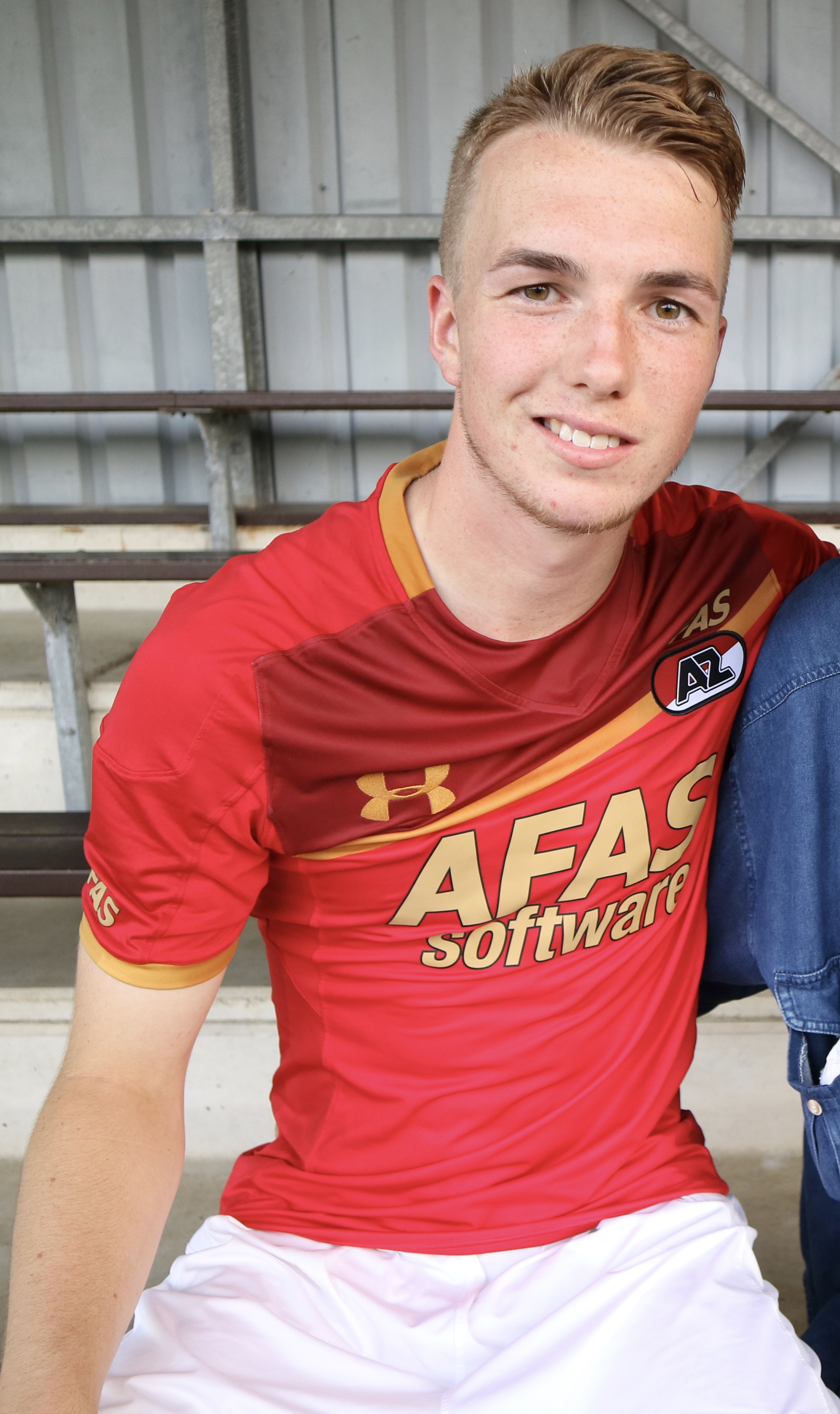
- Bakker with Jong AZ in 2017

Personal information
- Date of birth: 3 March 1998 (age 28)
- Place of birth: Amsterdam, Netherlands
- Height: 1.89 m (6 ft 2 in)
- Position: Centre-back

Team information
- Current team: Katwijk
- Number: 37

Youth career
- SV Zandvoort
- FC Purmerend
- Zeeburgia
- 2007–2010: Ajax
- 2010–2011: AFC
- 2011–2016: AZ

Senior career*
Years	Team	Apps	(Gls)
2016–2020	Jong AZ	93	(1)
2020–2023	Go Ahead Eagles	31	(1)
2023–2024	KuPS	5	(0)
2023–2024	KuPS II	4	(0)
2024–2026	Vitesse	18	(0)
2026–	Katwijk	15	(0)

International career
2013	Netherlands U15	3	(0)
2013–2014	Netherlands U16	5	(1)
2014	Netherlands U17	2	(0)
- * Club domestic league appearances and goals as of 21:30, 20 October 2026 (UTC)

Justin Bakker (born 3 March 1998) is a Dutch footballer who plays as a centre-back for Tweede Divisie club Katwijk.

A product of the AZ academy, he made 94 appearances for the club's reserve side Jong AZ before joining Go Ahead Eagles in 2020, with whom he won promotion to the Eredivisie in his first season. After spells with Finnish club KuPS and Vitesse, he dropped into the Tweede Divisie with Katwijk in 2026.

== Club career ==
=== AZ ===
Bakker played in the youth system of Ajax before moving to the AZ academy, and represented the Netherlands at under-15, under-16 and under-17 level. On 14 December 2016, he was named in the AZ first-team squad for a KNVB Cup match against ASWH, although he did not play, and the following day he signed a contract extension that kept him at the club until 2020. That season he won the Tweede Divisie with Jong AZ in the 2016–17 season.

He made his professional debut on 18 August 2017, as Jong AZ won 3–1 away at FC Den Bosch in the Eerste Divisie, and went on to make 94 appearances for the reserve side before leaving AZ in 2020.

=== Go Ahead Eagles ===
Bakker impressed the coaching staff during a trial at Go Ahead Eagles and signed for the club as a free agent on 10 September 2020, agreeing a one-year contract with an option for a further year. He made his debut on 2 October, deputising at centre-back for the injured captain Jeroen Veldmate in a 3–2 home defeat to Jong FC Utrecht.

Go Ahead Eagles won promotion to the Eredivisie at the end of the 2020–21 season, and Bakker went on to make 16 appearances in the top flight, scoring once. He was never a regular starter, however, and on 31 January 2023, the final day of the transfer window, he left for Finnish club KuPS on a two-year contract with an option for a further year.

=== KuPS ===
Bakker suffered an injury in the summer of 2023 and spent much of the following year completing his rehabilitation back in the Netherlands. On 24 July 2024, he and KuPS agreed to terminate his contract by mutual consent.

=== Vitesse ===
Having trained with Vitesse during pre-season, Bakker signed a two-year contract with the Eerste Divisie club on 8 August 2024, with an option for a third. He said the club's back-to-basics approach appealed to him, while head scout Theo Janssen praised his left foot and his ability to switch the play.

In the summer of 2025, Vitesse lost its professional licence. By the time the club was reinstated on appeal, it had fewer than ten players under contract and began the 2025–26 season with a 12-point deduction. Bakker, still at the club, said the main challenge was to wipe out the deduction as quickly as possible. He lost his place in the side as the season progressed, although he started against Katwijk in the KNVB Cup, and his contract was terminated by mutual consent in late January 2026.

=== Katwijk ===
On 28 January 2026, Bakker joined Tweede Divisie club Katwijk on a contract until the end of the season, with a club option for a further year. Having recently moved back from Arnhem to Purmerend, he said he wanted to focus on building a career outside football, which Katwijk had offered to support, and that the atmosphere during the cup match had made a strong impression on him. On behalf of the club, Cees Bruinink described his arrival as a golden opportunity following departures and injuries in the winter break, and highlighted his vision and passing range. He remained with Katwijk for the 2026–27 season.

== Personal life ==
His cousin Mitchel Bakker is also a professional footballer.

== Career statistics ==
As of match played 17 October 2026

Appearances and goals by club, season and competition
Club	Season	League			National cup (Note: Includes KNVB Cup, Suomen Cup)		Continental		Other		Total	
Club	Season	Division	Apps	Goals	Apps	Goals	Apps	Goals	Apps	Goals	Apps	Goals
Jong AZ	2016–17	Tweede Divisie	17	0	–		–		–		17	0
Jong AZ	2017–18	Eerste Divisie	33	1	–		–		–		33	1
Jong AZ	2018–19	Eerste Divisie	17	0	–		–		–		17	0
Jong AZ	2019–20	Eerste Divisie	26	0	–		–		–		26	0
Jong AZ	Total		93	1	0	0	0	0	0	0	93	1
Go Ahead Eagles	2020–21	Eerste Divisie	15	0	3	0	–		–		18	0
Go Ahead Eagles	2021–22	Eredivisie	13	1	1	0	–		–		14	1
Go Ahead Eagles	2022–23	Eredivisie	3	0	0	0	–		–		3	0
Go Ahead Eagles	Total		31	1	4	0	0	0	0	0	35	1
KuPS Akatemia	2023	Kakkonen	4	0	–		–		–		4	0
KuPS	2023	Veikkausliiga	5	0	0	0	0	0	5 (Note: Includes Finnish League Cup)	0	10	0
KuPS	2024	Veikkausliiga	0	0	0	0	0	0	0	0	0	0
KuPS	Total		5	0	0	0	0	0	5	0	10	0
Vitesse	2024–25	Eerste Divisie	11	0	1	0	—		—		12	0
Vitesse	2025–26	Eerste Divisie	7	0	1	0	—		—		8	0
Vitesse	Total		18	0	2	0	—		—		20	0
Katwijk	2025–26	Tweede Divisie	11	0	—		—		—		11	0
Katwijk	2026–27	Tweede Divisie	4	0	1	0	—		—		5	0
Katwijk	Total		15	0	1	0	—		—		16	0
Career total			166	2	7	0	0	0	5	0	178	2

== Honours ==
Jong AZ

- Tweede Divisie: 2016–17

KuPS

- Veikkausliiga runner-up: 2023
