= Jerry Voutilainen =

Finnish footballer (born 1995)

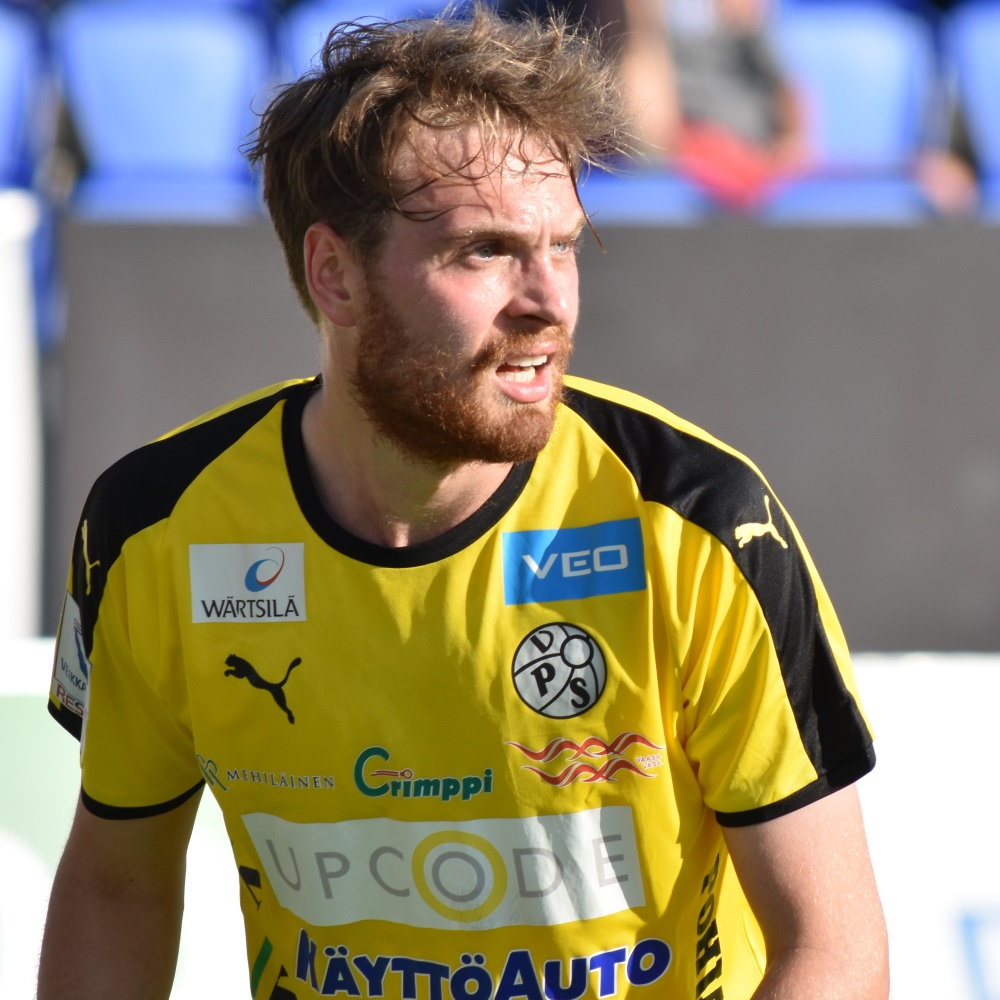
- Jerry Voutilainen with VPS in 2018.

Personal information
- Date of birth: 29 March 1995 (age 31)
- Place of birth: Kuopio, Finland
- Height: 1.77 m (5 ft 10 in)
- Position: Midfielder

Team information
- Current team: KuPS
- Number: 7

Youth career
- –2011: KuPS

Senior career*
Years	Team	Apps	(Gls)
2011–2014	KuPS	60	(3)
2015–2019	VPS	116	(4)
2020–2023	Honka	64	(10)
2024–	KuPS	39	(0)

International career
2011	Finland U17	2	(0)
2012	Finland U18	1	(0)
2013	Finland U19	3	(0)
2014	Finland U20	1	(0)
2015	Finland U21	5	(0)
- * Club domestic league appearances and goals as of 19 November 2025

Jerry Voutilainen (born 29 March 1995) is a Finnish professional footballer who plays as a midfielder for Kuopion Palloseura (KuPS) in Veikkausliiga.

== Career ==
Voutilainen made his Veikkausliiga debut for his hometown club KuPS on 12 September, 2011, in a game against HJK.

After playing five seasons with VPS, it was confirmed on 13 November 2019, that Voutilainen would join FC Honka from the 2020 season, signing a deal until the end of the year.

Voutilainen was named the Veikkausliiga Player of the Month in April 2022, when playing with Honka. He missed almost the whole 2023 season after a season-ending injury on 24 April 2023 in a match against Haka.

On 25 November 2023, it was announced that Voutilainen had signed a three-year deal with his former club KuPS, and returns to his hometown Kuopio. Voutilainen returned to the line-up in May 2024, over a year after his injury.

== Personal life ==
Voutilainen has publicly told about his former gambling addiction, which started in his teens and lasted for several years.

== Career statistics ==
As of match played 27 April 2025

Club	Season	League			National cup		League cup		Europe		Total	
Club	Season	Division	Apps	Goals	Apps	Goals	Apps	Goals	Apps	Goals	Apps	Goals
KuPS	2011	Veikkausliiga	2	0	0	0	—		—		2	0
KuPS	2012	Veikkausliiga	17	3	2	0	5	1	1 (Note: Appearance(s) in the UEFA Europa League)	0	25	4
KuPS	2013	Veikkausliiga	13	0	3	1	8	1	—		24	2
KuPS	2014	Veikkausliiga	28	0	2	0	5	0	—		35	0
KuPS	Total		60	3	7	1	18	2	1	0	96	6
SiPS (loan)	2012	Kolmonen	1	0	—		—		—		1	0
VPS	2015	Veikkausliiga	18	2	0	0	3	0	0	0	21	2
VPS	2016	Veikkausliiga	25	2	1	0	1	1	—		27	3
VPS	2017	Veikkausliiga	26	0	6	1	—		4	1	36	2
VPS	2018	Veikkausliiga	26	0	5	0	—		—		31	0
VPS	2019	Veikkausliiga	21	0	7	2	—		—		28	2
VPS	Total		116	4	19	3	4	1	4	1	143	9
Honka	2020	Veikkausliiga	21	0	7	0	—		1	0	12	4
Honka	2021	Veikkausliiga	13	4	1	0	—		2 (Note: Appearance(s) in the UEFA Europa Conference League)	0	16	4
Honka	2022	Veikkausliiga	26	6	1	0	6	0	—		16	4
Honka	2023	Veikkausliiga	4	0	0	0	5	0	0	0	9	0
Honka	Total		64	10	9	0	11	0	3	0	87	10
KuPS	2024	Veikkausliiga	17	0	5	0	0	0	3	0	25	0
KuPS	2025	Veikkausliiga	5	0	0	0	2	0	0	0	7	0
KuPS	Total		22	0	5	0	2	0	3	0	32	0
KuPS Akatemia	2024	Ykkönen	1	0	—		—		—		1	0
Career total			264	17	40	4	35	3	11	1	350	25

== Honours ==
Honka

- Finnish League Cup: 2022

KuPS

- Veikkausliiga: 2024
- Finnish Cup: 2024
