= Mohammed Muritala =

Nigerian footballer (born 2003)

Personal information
- Full name: Mohammed Muritala Omotosho
- Date of birth: 12 November 2003 (age 23)
- Place of birth: Ilorin, Nigeria
- Height: 1.83 m (6 ft 0 in)
- Position: Forward

Youth career
- TikiTaka

Senior career*
Years	Team	Apps	(Gls)
2024	→ KuPS (loan)	6	(0)
2024	→ KuPS II (loan)	7	(0)
2024	Hercules	4	(2)
- * Club domestic league appearances and goals as of 29 September 2024

Mohammed Muritala Omotosho (born 12 November 2003) is a Nigerian professional footballer who plays as a forward.

== Honours ==
KuPS

- Finnish League Cup runner-up: 2024
