= Patrik Lomski =

Finnish footballer (born 1989)

Personal information
- Date of birth: 3 February 1989 (age 37)
- Place of birth: Turku, Finland
- Height: 1.77 m (5 ft 10 in)
- Position: Winger

Youth career
- TPS

Senior career*
| Years | Team | Apps | (Gls) |
| 2006–2011 | TPS | 22 | (2) |
| 2009 | → KPV (loan) | 3 | (0) |
| 2011 | → PoPa (loan) | 9 | (0) |
| 2011–2012 | SJK | 32 | (7) |
| 2013 | VPS | 25 | (2) |
| 2014 | TPS | 22 | (1) |
| 2015–2016 | Arka Gdynia | 14 | (1) |
| 2015–2016 | Arka Gdynia II | 16 | (1) |
| 2016 | TPS | 5 | (0) |

International career
| | Finland U17 | 2 | (0) |
- Finland U19
| 2009 | Finland U21 | 2 | (0) |
- * Club domestic league appearances and goals

Patrik Lomski (born 3 February 1989) is a Finnish former professional footballer who played mainly as a winger. Lomski represented Finland at many different youth levels. He was a versatile player who could play anywhere on the forward line.

== Career ==
Lomski scored for Arka Gdynia on his I liga debut against GKS Tychy 8 March 2015.

On 23 August 2016, he rejoined his youth club TPS on a contract until the season after playing 1.5 years for Arka Gdynia. However, he retired after the 2016 season.

Later he has played occasionally for Finnish amateur clubs Hot Lips and Hot Lips/2 in Nelonen, Vitonen and Kutonen.

== Personal life ==
Lomski was born and raised in Finland to a Finnish mother and a Polish-born father.

== Career statistics ==
As of 26 August 2024.

Appearances and goals by club, season and competition
| Club | Season | League | | | Cup (Note: Includes Suomen Cup and Polish Cup) | | League cup (Note: Includes Finnish League Cup) | | Europe | | Total | |
| Club | Season | Division | Apps | Goals | Apps | Goals | Apps | Goals | Apps | Goals | Apps | Goals |
|---|---|---|---|---|---|---|---|---|---|---|---|---|
| TPS | 2006 | Veikkausliiga | 2 | 0 | – | | – | | – | | 2 | 0 |
| TPS | 2007 | Veikkausliiga | 5 | 2 | – | | – | | – | | 5 | 2 |
| TPS | 2008 | Veikkausliiga | 8 | 0 | – | | – | | 3 (Note: Appearances in UEFA Intertoto Cup) | 0 | 11 | 0 |
| TPS | 2009 | Veikkausliiga | 6 | 0 | 0 | 0 | 7 | 0 | – | | 13 | 0 |
| TPS | 2010 | Veikkausliiga | 1 | 0 | 0 | 0 | 1 | 0 | – | | 2 | 0 |
| TPS | 2011 | Veikkausliiga | 0 | 0 | 0 | 0 | 0 | 0 | – | | 0 | 0 |
| TPS | Total | | 22 | 2 | 0 | 0 | 8 | 0 | 3 | 0 | 33 | 2 |
| KPV (loan) | 2009 | Ykkönen | 4 | 0 | – | | – | | – | | 4 | 0 |
| PoPa (loan) | 2011 | Ykkönen | 9 | 0 | – | | – | | – | | 9 | 0 |
| Åbo IFK (loan) | 2011 | Kakkonen | 2 | 1 | – | | – | | – | | 2 | 1 |
| SJK | 2011 | Kakkonen | 11 | 3 | – | | – | | – | | 11 | 3 |
| SJK | 2012 | Ykkönen | 26 | 3 | 2 | 0 | – | | – | | 28 | 3 |
| SJK | Total | | 37 | 6 | 2 | 0 | 0 | 0 | 0 | 0 | 39 | 3 |
| VPS | 2013 | Veikkausliiga | 25 | 2 | 3 | 2 | 6 | 0 | – | | 34 | 4 |
| TPS | 2014 | Veikkausliiga | 22 | 1 | 1 | 0 | 0 | 0 | – | | 23 | 1 |
| Arka Gdynia | 2014–15 | I liga | 7 | 1 | – | | – | | – | | 7 | 1 |
| Arka Gdynia | 2015–16 | I liga | 7 | 0 | 1 | 0 | – | | – | | 8 | 0 |
| Arka Gdynia | Total | | 14 | 1 | 1 | 0 | 0 | 0 | 0 | 0 | 15 | 1 |
| Arka Gdynia II | 2014–15 | III liga | 16 | 1 | – | | – | | – | | 16 | 1 |
| TPS | 2016 | Ykkönen | 5 | 0 | – | | – | | – | | 5 | 0 |
| Career total | | | 126 | 14 | 7 | 2 | 14 | 0 | 3 | 0 | 150 | 16 |

== Honours ==
Arka Gdynia

- I liga: 2015–16
