= Jippo =

Finnish football club

- Full name: Jippo Joensuu
- Founded: 2001
- Ground: Mehtimäki, Joensuu
- Capacity: 1,000
- Manager: Mikko Hallikainen
- League: Ykkösliiga
- 2026: Ykkösliiga, 4th of 10
Home colours	Away colours

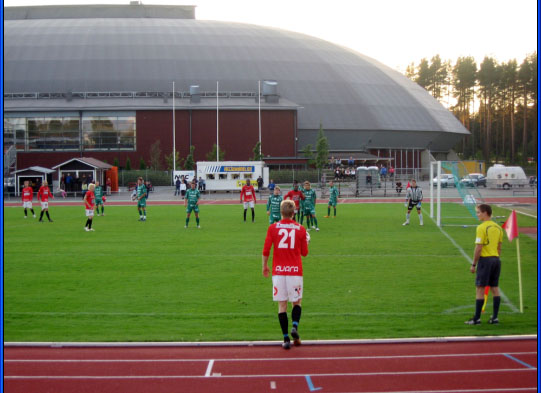
Joensuun Keskuskenttä

Jippo (stylised as JIPPO 2001–2024) is a Finnish football club, based in Joensuu. It plays in the Ykkösliiga, the second highest level of Finnish football. Jippo plays its home matches at Mehtimäki, Joensuu.

== History ==
JIPPO was formed in 2001 after the merger of JiiPee and Ratanat – both playing in the Kakkonen (third level), the division Jippo played its first four seasons from 2002 to 2005. The team was promoted to Ykkönen for the season 2006 after winning the eastern group of Kakkonen and beating Klubi-04 2–1 on aggregate in the promotion playoff. Arpad Mester scored the winner goal. After 9 years of playing in Ykkönen, JIPPO relegated back to Kakkonen for the season 2015, winning promotion back to Ykkönen after the 2020 season.

During 2022–2023, JIPPO competed in Kakkonen. For the 2024 season, the club won promotion to the new second tier Ykkösliiga, and at the end of the season surprisingly finished 3rd in the division. Since January 2025, the club is called Jippo without the capitalization. In April 2025, Jippo won its first Ykkösliigacup title.

== Current squad ==
As of 4 September 2026

Note: Flags indicate national team as defined under FIFA eligibility rules; some limited exceptions apply. Players may hold more than one non-FIFA nationality.

No.	Pos.	Nation	Player
1	GK	FIN	Pyry Piirainen
2	DF	ESP	Karlos Mahugo
3	DF	FIN	Valtteri Vesiaho
4	DF	BRA	Victor de Paula
6	MF	JPN	Junnosuke Watanabe
8	MF	FIN	Terrence Smith
9	FW	FIN	Miro Turunen
10	FW	FIN	Olavi Keturi (on loan from VPS)
11	FW	FIN	Jyri Kiuru
12	DF	FIN	Juho Lehtiranta
13	FW	FIN	Luka Räsänen

No.	Pos.	Nation	Player
15	MF	FIN	Lauri Sahimaa
16	MF	FIN	Pasi Forsman
18	MF	FIN	Eeli Kinnunen
20	MF	FIN	Lassi Forss
21	DF	FIN	Nuutti Tykkyläinen
22	GK	FIN	Verneri Vainikainen
24	DF	FIN	Niklas Haataja
28	FW	FIN	Eemeli Honkola
33	GK	FIN	Erkka Oikarinen
41	MF	JPN	Yoshiaki Kikuchi
90	FW	FIN	Aleksi Tarvonen

== League history ==
Season to season of JIPPO
- 12 seasons in second tier
- 10 seasons in third tier
- 2 seasons in fourth tier

Season	Level	Division	Section	Administration	Position	Movements
2002	Tier 3	Kakkonen (Second Division)	Eastern Group	Finnish FA (Suomen Palloliitto)	5th	
2003	Tier 3	Kakkonen (Second Division)	Eastern Group	Finnish FA (Suomen Palloliitto)	9th	
2004	Tier 3	Kakkonen (Second Division)	Eastern Group	Finnish FA (Suomen Palloliitto)	2nd	
2005	Tier 3	Kakkonen (Second Division)	Eastern Group	Finnish FA (Suomen Palloliitto)	1st (Champions)	Promoted
2006	Tier 2	Ykkönen (First Division)		Finnish FA (Suomen Palloliitto)	5th	
2007	Tier 2	Ykkönen (First Division)		Finnish FA (Suomen Palloliitto)	9th	
2008	Tier 2	Ykkönen (First Division)		Finnish FA (Suomen Palloliitto)	5th	
2009	Tier 2	Ykkönen (First Division)		Finnish FA (Suomen Palloliitto)	10th	
2010	Tier 2	Ykkönen (First Division)		Finnish FA (Suomen Palloliitto)	11th	
2011	Tier 2	Ykkönen (First Division)		Finnish FA (Suomen Palloliitto)	8th	
2012	Tier 2	Ykkönen (First Division)		Finnish FA (Suomen Palloliitto)	8th	
2013	Tier 2	Ykkönen (First Division)		Finnish FA (Suomen Palloliitto)	8th	
2014	Tier 2	Ykkönen (First Division)		Finnish FA (Suomen Palloliitto)	9th	Relegated
2015	Tier 3	Kakkonen (Second Division)	Eastern Group	Finnish FA (Suomen Palloliitto)	8th	Relegated
2016	Tier 4	Kolmonen (Third Division)	Eastern & Central Finland	Eastern Finland FA (SPL Itä-Suomen piiri)	3rd	
2017	Tier 4	Kolmonen (Third Division)	Eastern & Central Finland	Eastern Finland FA (SPL Itä-Suomen piiri)	1st (Champions)	Promoted
2018	Tier 3	Kakkonen (Second Division)	Group A	Finnish FA (Suomen Palloliitto)	3rd	
2019	Tier 3	Kakkonen (Second Division)	Group A	Finnish FA (Suomen Palloliitto)	2nd	
2020	Tier 3	Kakkonen (Second Division)	Group C	Finnish FA (Suomen Palloliitto)	1st (Champions)	Promoted
2021	Tier 2	Ykkönen (First Division)		Finnish FA (Suomen Palloliitto)	12th	Relegated
2022	Tier 3	Kakkonen (Second Division)	Group A	Finnish FA (Suomen Palloliitto)	2nd	
2023	Tier 3	Kakkonen (Second Division)	Group A	Finnish FA (Suomen Palloliitto)	1st (Champions)	Promoted
2024	Tier 2	Ykkösliiga (League One)		Finnish FA (Suomen Palloliitto)	3rd	
2025	Tier 2	Ykkösliiga (League One)		Finnish FA (Suomen Palloliitto)	3rd	
