= 2020 Kakkonen =

Kakkonen
- Season: 2020

A total of 36 teams contested the league divided into three groups, Lohko A (Group A), Lohko B (Group B) and Lohko C (Group C). 25 returning from the 2019 season, two relegated from Ykkönen and nine promoted from Kolmonen. The top four of each group will qualify to promotion matches to decide which three teams get promoted to the Ykkönen. The bottom two teams in each group will get relegated to the Kolmonen. Each team will play a total of 22 matches, playing twice against each team of its group.

== Tables ==
=== Lohko A (Group A) ===
Pos	Team	Pld	W	D	L	GF	GA	GD	Pts	Qualification
1	PK-35	8	6	1	1	22	5	+17	19	Qualification to Promotion Group
2	EPS	7	4	3	0	12	6	+6	15	Qualification to Promotion Group
3	JäPs	7	4	1	2	16	10	+6	13	Qualification to Promotion Group
4	Kiffen 08	7	3	3	1	10	4	+6	12	Qualification to Promotion Group
5	Honka Akatemia	7	3	3	1	9	7	+2	12	
6	MiPK	7	4	0	3	12	13	−1	12	
7	PEPO	8	3	3	2	8	10	−2	12	
8	Reipas Lahti	7	3	0	4	11	10	+1	9	
9	NJS	8	2	1	5	8	14	−6	7	
10	PKKU	7	1	2	4	11	18	−7	5	
11	Viikingit	7	1	1	5	5	15	−10	4	Relegation to Kolmonen
12	Kultsu	8	1	0	7	6	18	−12	3	Relegation to Kolmonen

Updated to match(es) played on 7 August 2020. Source: Soccerway
Rules for classification: 1) Points; 2) Goal difference; 3) Goals scored; 4) Head-to-head points; 5) Head-to-head goal difference; 6) Head-to-head goals scored; 7) Fewer away goals conceded; 8) Home goals scored; 9) Fewer home goals conceded; 10) Play-off; 11) Draw.

=== Lohko B (Group B) ===
Pos	Team	Pld	W	D	L	GF	GA	GD	Pts	Qualification
1	Klubi 04 (Q)	8	7	1	0	28	8	+20	22	Qualification to Promotion Group
2	Ilves II	8	7	1	0	28	9	+19	22	Qualification to Promotion Group
3	Atlantis	8	4	1	3	20	18	+2	13	Qualification to Promotion Group
4	PIF	7	3	3	1	9	5	+4	12	Qualification to Promotion Group
5	HJS Akatemia	8	2	4	2	13	13	0	10	
6	KaaPo	8	2	3	3	14	15	−1	9	
7	SalPa	8	2	2	4	15	21	−6	8	
8	GrIFK	8	2	1	5	15	28	−13	7	
9	TPV	7	1	3	3	9	14	−5	6	
10	Espoo	8	2	0	6	11	18	−7	6	
11	Jazz	7	0	5	2	7	11	−4	5	Relegation to Kolmonen
12	P-Iirot	7	1	2	4	4	13	−9	5	Relegation to Kolmonen

Updated to match(es) played on 7 August 2020. Source: Soccerway
Rules for classification: 1) Points; 2) Goal difference; 3) Goals scored; 4) Head-to-head points; 5) Head-to-head goal difference; 6) Head-to-head goals scored; 7) Fewer away goals conceded; 8) Home goals scored; 9) Fewer home goals conceded; 10) Play-off; 11) Draw.
(Q) Qualified for the phase indicated

=== Lohko C (Group C) ===
Pos	Team	Pld	W	D	L	GF	GA	GD	Pts	Qualification
1	GBK	7	4	2	1	17	4	+13	14	Qualification to Promotion Group
2	JIPPO	6	4	2	0	10	1	+9	14	Qualification to Promotion Group
3	JS Hercules	7	4	2	1	13	5	+8	14	Qualification to Promotion Group
4	JJK	7	4	2	1	15	10	+5	14	Qualification to Promotion Group
5	Vaajakoski	7	4	0	3	13	12	+1	12	
6	KuFu-98	7	4	0	3	16	17	−1	12	
7	RoPS II	7	3	1	3	13	13	0	10	
8	JBK	7	2	3	2	11	11	0	9	
9	OLS	7	2	1	4	8	14	−6	7	
10	Kemi City	7	2	0	5	12	13	−1	6	
11	VIFK	8	1	1	6	8	24	−16	4	Relegation to Kolmonen
12	Kiisto	7	1	0	6	6	18	−12	3	Relegation to Kolmonen

Updated to match(es) played on 7 August 2020. Source: Soccerway
Rules for classification: 1) Points; 2) Goal difference; 3) Goals scored; 4) Head-to-head points; 5) Head-to-head goal difference; 6) Head-to-head goals scored; 7) Fewer away goals conceded; 8) Home goals scored; 9) Fewer home goals conceded; 10) Play-off; 11) Draw.

== Promotion groups ==
The top four teams from each group will progress to this stage and compete in a four-team competition to determine the three groups winners to gain promotion to the Ykkönen.
