= SC Kuopio Futis-98 =

Finnish football club

- Full name: Soccer Club Kuopio Futis-98
- Nickname(s): SC KuFu-98
- Founded: 1998; 27 years ago
- Ground: Savon Sanomat Areena; Kuopio
- Capacity: 5,000
- Chairman: Mikko Kolehmainen
- Manager: Marko Kurikka
- Coach: Jarmo Matilainen
- League: Kolmonen
Home colours

SC Kuopio Futis-98 (abbreviated SC KuFu-98 or KuFu-98) was a football club from Kuopio, Finland. The club was formed in 1998 and their home ground is Savon Sanomat Areena.

Since 2015 KuFu-98 acted as a farm club of Veikkausliiga club KuPS. In December 2021, it was announced that the newly established KuPS Akatemia (or KuPS II) will continue as the reserve team of KuPS and will gain the position and rights of SC KuFu-98.

== Background ==
SC KuFu-98 was established in 1998, the club's inaugural meeting being attended by Leo Pohjolainen, Jarmo Hämäläinen, Heikki Kärkkäinen, Markku Korhonen, Pekka Toivanen, Janne Koskinen and Mikko Kolehmainen. The players for the first season came mainly from the Airakselan Yrityksen sports club.

The club began their competitive matches in the Nelonen (Fourth Division). After their first season they gained promotion to the Kolmonen (Third Division) where they have subsequently played most of their football. The one exception was in 2003 when they have played one season in the Kakkonen (Second Division), the third tier of Finnish football.

Well-known former players are Yrjö Happonen, Atik Ismail, Pele Koljonen, Janne Savolainen and Freddy Adu.

== Season to season ==
Season	Level	Division	Section	Administration	Position	Movements
2002	Tier 4	Kolmonen (Third Division)		Eastern Finland (SPL Itä-Suomi)	2nd	Promoted
2003	Tier 3	Kakkonen (Second Division)	East Group	Finnish FA (Suomen Pallolitto)	12th	Relegated
2004	Tier 4	Kolmonen (Third Division)		Eastern Finland (SPL Itä-Suomi)	5th	
2005	Tier 4	Kolmonen (Third Division)		Eastern Finland (SPL Itä-Suomi)	4th	
2006	Tier 4	Kolmonen (Third Division)		Eastern Finland (SPL Itä-Suomi)	10th	
2007	Tier 4	Kolmonen (Third Division)		Eastern Finland (SPL Itä-Suomi)	6th	
2008	Tier 4	Kolmonen (Third Division)		Eastern Finland (SPL Itä-Suomi)	4th	
2009	Tier 4	Kolmonen (Third Division)		Eastern and Central Finland (SPL Itä-Suomi)	2nd	
2010	Tier 4	Kolmonen (Third Division)		Eastern and Central Finland (SPL Itä-Suomi)		

- 1 season in Kakkonen
- 8 seasons in Kolmonen

== Club structure ==
Soccer Club Kuopio Futis-98 run one team. The club does not have a junior section.

== 2010 season ==
SC KuFu-98 is competing in the Kolmonen administered by the Itä-Suomi SPL and Keski-Suomi SPL. This is the fourth highest tier in the Finnish football system. In 2009 the team finished in second place in the Kolmonen.
